= List of Accept band members =

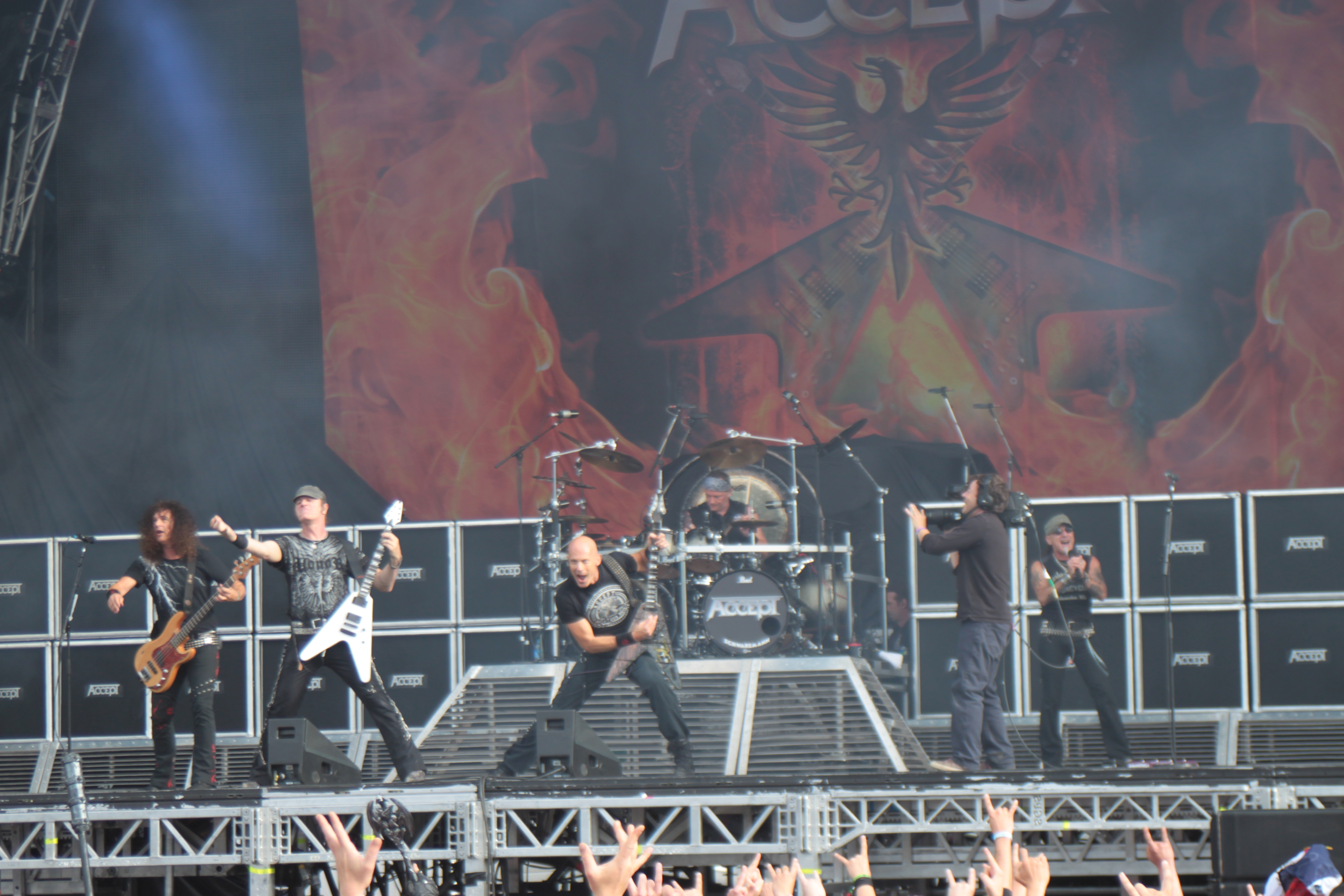
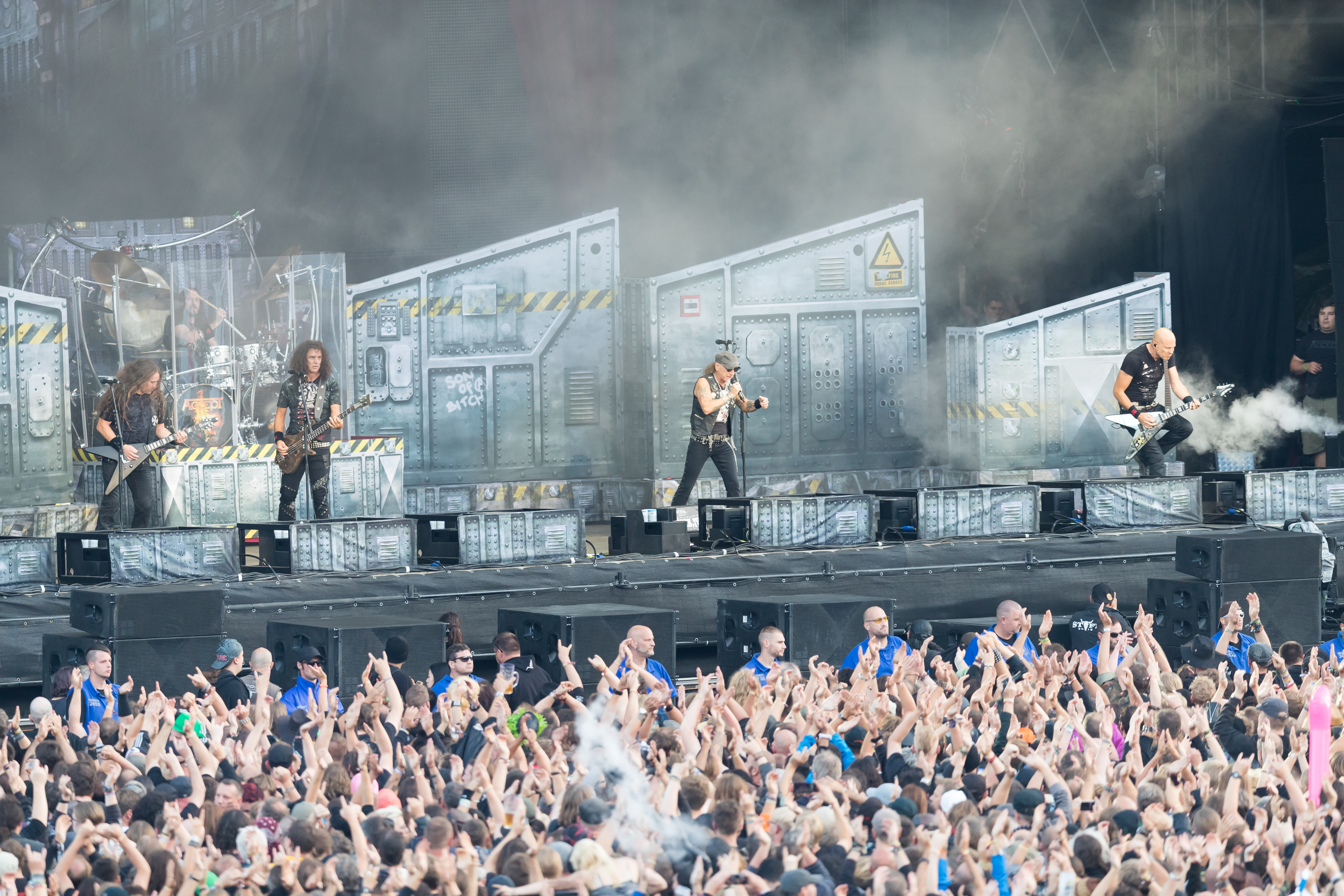
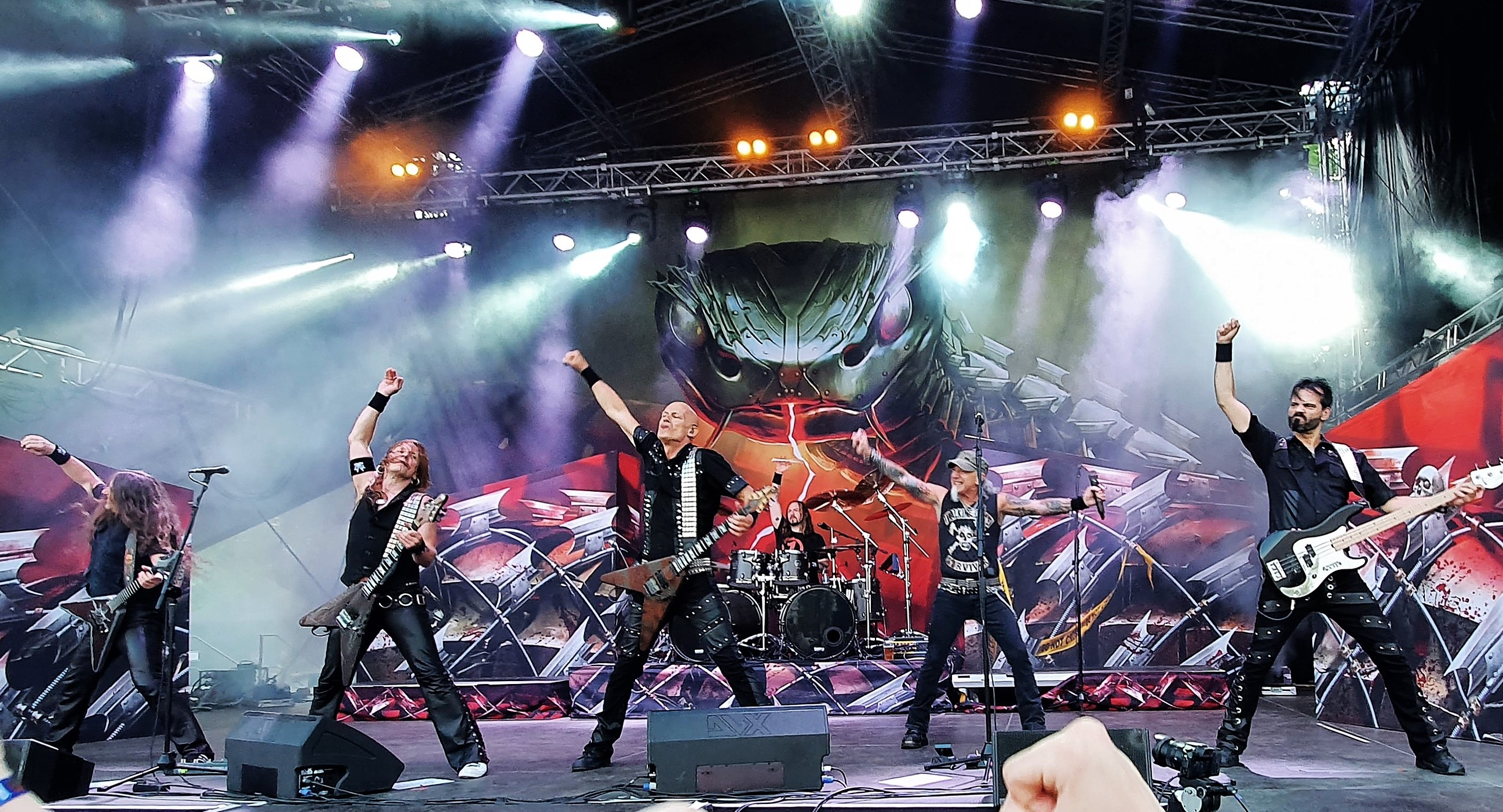
Three line-ups of Accept performing in 2013, 2017, and 2022.

Accept is a German heavy metal band from Solingen formed in 1976 with their first consistent lineup featuring lead singer Udo Dirkschneider, lead guitarist Wolf Hoffmann, bassist Peter Baltes, rhythm guitarist Jörg Fischer and drummer Stefan Kaufmann. The band's current lineup includes Hoffmann, lead vocalist Mark Tornillo (since 2009), drummer Christopher Williams (since 2015), bassist Martin Motnik and rhythm guitarist Philip Shouse (both since 2019).

== History ==
=== 1976–1994 ===
Accept evolved from an earlier group called Band X, formed in 1968 by lead vocalist Udo Dirkschneider. After several lineup changes the band would change their name to Accept, with their lineup consisting of Dirkschneider, lead guitarist Wolf Hoffmann, rhythm guitarist Gerard Wahl, bassist Peter Baltes and drummer Frank Friedrich.

Wahl was replaced by Jörg Fischer in 1977. After the recording of the group's self-titled debut album, Friedrich left Accept and was replaced by Stefan Kaufmann. Fischer was fired by the band after wrapping up the Breaker tour in 1982. He was replaced briefly by Jan Koemmet, followed by Herman Frank shortly before the release of Restless and Wild. Dirkscheider left and returned during the recording of Balls to the Wall in 1983, and Fischer returned to replace Frank shortly after the release of Balls to the Wall.

In 1987, Dirkschneider was fired from Accept and subsequently pursued a solo career under the moniker U.D.O. He was replaced by a succession of temporary vocalists including Michael White and Baby Tuckoo frontman Rob Armitage, before the band settled on David Reece and released Eat the Heat in 1989. Fischer left again before the recording of the album. Jim Stacey joined on rhythm guitar for the album's promotional tour, which also saw Ken Mary take over from Kaufmann on tour after he suffered a back injury. Accept subsequently decided to disband, after increasing differences with Reece and Kaufmann's injury. By 1992, the band had returned with a lineup of Dirkschneider, Hoffmann, Baltes and Kaufmann, releasing Objection Overruled the next year. Arjen Lucassen of Vengeance was involved at the time, he was supposed to be the touring guitarist but left before the tour started. Kaufmann was forced to leave again after the release of Death Row, with Stefan Schwarzmann taking his place.

=== Since 1994 ===
After the Death Row touring cycle, Schwarzmann was replaced by Michael Cartellone, who performed on 1996's Predator. The group disbanded for a second time in 1997. In 2005, Accept returned for a short run of shows in Europe and Japan, with Dirkschneider, Hoffmann and Baltes joined by Frank and Schwarzmann. The tour ended in August, after which Hoffmann claimed that Dirkschneider was preventing a longer reunion for the band. Members returned to other projects until 2009, when a new lineup of Accept was unveiled with vocalist Mark Tornillo in place of Dirkschneider. The group's lineup remained stable until 2014, when Frank and Schwarzmann were fired. Their places were taken in April 2015 by Uwe Lulis and Christopher Williams, respectively. Baltes quit the band in November 2018.

For tour dates in early 2019, Baltes was replaced by Danny Silvestri, who had previously played with the group in 2017. In April, the band brought in Martin Motnik as their new full-time bassist. On 1 November, the band announced that Philip Shouse, previously a touring member, had joined them as their third guitarist, thus making them a sextet. In September 2025 the band parted ways with Lulis, thus returning to a two guitar line-up.

== Members ==
=== Current ===
Image	Name	Years active	Instruments	Release contributions
	Wolf Hoffmann	1976–1989; 1992–1997; 2005; 2009–present	lead guitar; backing vocals	all Accept releases
	Mark Tornillo	2009–present	lead vocals	all Accept releases from Blood of the Nations (2010) onwards
	Christopher Williams	2015–present	drums; backing vocals	all Accept releases from Restless and Live (2017) onwards
	Martin Motnik	2019–present	bass; backing vocals	all Accept releases from Too Mean to Die (2021) onwards
	Philip Shouse	2019–present	guitar; backing vocals	Too Mean to Die (2021)

=== Former ===
Image	Name	Years active	Instruments	Release contributions
	Peter Baltes	1976–1989; 1992–1997; 2005; 2009–2018	bass; backing and occasional lead vocals	all Accept releases to Symphonic Terror: Live at Wacken 2017 (2018)
	Udo Dirkschneider	1976–1987; 1992–1997; 2005	lead vocals	all Accept releases from Accept (1979) to All Areas: Worldwide (1997) except Eat the Heat (1989)
	Frank Friedrich	1976–1979	drums	Accept (1979)
	Gerhard Wahl	1976–1978	rhythm guitar	none
	Jörg Fischer	1978–1982; 1984–1988	rhythm guitar; backing vocals	all Accept releases from Accept (1979) to Staying a Life (1990), except Balls to the Wall (1983) and Eat the Heat (1989)
	Stefan Kaufmann	1979–1989; 1992–1994	drums	all Accept releases from I'm a Rebel (1980) to Death Row (1994); All Areas: Worldwide (1997)
	Herman Frank	1982–1984; 2005; 2009–2014	rhythm guitar	Balls to the Wall (1983); Blood of the Nations (2010); Stalingrad (2012); Blind Rage (2014)
	Michael White	1987	lead vocals	none
	Rob Armitage	1987–1988	lead vocals	none
	David Reece	1988–1989	lead vocals	Eat the Heat (1989)
	Jim Stacey	1989	rhythm guitar	none
	Stefan Schwarzmann	1994–1995; 2005; 2009–2014	drums	Death Row (1994) – two tracks only; all Accept releases from All Areas: Worldwide (1997) to Blind Rage (2014)
	Uwe Lulis	2015–2025	rhythm guitar; backing vocals	all Accept releases from Restless and Live (2017) to Humanoid (2024)

=== Touring ===
Image	Name	Years active	Instruments	Details
	Jan Koemmet	1982	rhythm guitar	Koemmet was hired to replace Jörg Fischer and was soon replaced Herman Frank.
	Ken Mary	1989	drums	Mary was hired to finish the Eat the Heat tour due to Stefan Kauffmann's health problems.
	Michael Cartellone	1995–1997	drums	Cartellone was hired Stefan Kauffmann's departure health problems and has played on Predator (1996) as session musician.
	Danny Silvestri	2017; 2019	bass	Silvestri substituted for Baltes at Wacken Open Air 2017, and rejoined after his departure in late 2018.
	Ava-Rebekah Rahman	2019	violin	Rahman joined the touring lineup of Accept for the Symphonic Terror tour.
	Joel Hoekstra	2024	guitar	Hoekstra temporarily filled in for Shouse.
	Shawn Drover	2026	drums	Drover temporarily fills in for Williams.

== Lineups ==
Period	Members	Releases
1976 – late 1978	Udo Dirkschneider – lead vocals; Wolf Hoffmann – lead guitar, backing vocals; Gerhard Wahl – rhythm guitar; Peter Baltes – bass, backing vocals; Frank Friedrich – drums	none
Late 1978 – early 1979	Udo Dirkschneider – lead vocals; Wolf Hoffmann – lead guitar, backing vocals; Jörg Fischer – rhythm guitar, backing vocals; Peter Baltes – bass, backing vocals; Frank Friedrich – drums	Accept (1979)
Early 1979 – early 1982	Udo Dirkschneider – lead vocals; Wolf Hoffmann – lead guitar, backing vocals; Jörg Fischer – rhythm guitar, backing vocals; Peter Baltes – bass, backing vocals; Stefan Kaufmann – drums	I'm a Rebel (1980); Breaker (1981)
Early – mid 1982	Udo Dirkschneider – lead vocals; Wolf Hoffmann – guitars, backing vocals; Peter Baltes – bass, backing vocals; Stefan Kaufmann – drums	Restless and Wild (1982)
Mid 1982	Udo Dirkschneider – lead vocals; Wolf Hoffmann – lead guitar, backing vocals; Jan Koemmet – rhythm guitar (touring); Peter Baltes – bass, backing vocals; Stefan Kaufmann – drums	none
Late 1982 – early 1984	Udo Dirkschneider – lead vocals; Wolf Hoffmann – lead guitar, backing vocals; Herman Frank – rhythm guitar; Peter Baltes – bass, backing vocals; Stefan Kaufmann – drums	Balls to the Wall (1983)
Early 1984 – mid 1987	Udo Dirkschneider – lead vocals; Wolf Hoffmann – lead guitar, backing vocals; Jörg Fischer – rhythm guitar, backing vocals; Peter Baltes – bass, backing vocals; Stefan Kaufmann – drums	Metal Heart (1985); Kaizoku-Ban (1985); Russian Roulette (1986); Staying a Life (1990)
1987	Michael White – lead vocals; Wolf Hoffmann – lead guitar, backing vocals; Jörg Fischer – rhythm guitar, backing vocals; Peter Baltes – bass, backing vocals; Stefan Kaufmann – drums	none
1987 – 1988	Rob Armitage – lead vocals; Wolf Hoffmann – lead guitar, backing vocals; Jörg Fischer – rhythm guitar, backing vocals; Peter Baltes – bass, backing vocals; Stefan Kaufmann – drums	none
1988	David Reece – lead vocals; Wolf Hoffmann – lead guitar, backing vocals; Jörg Fischer – rhythm guitar, backing vocals; Peter Baltes – bass, backing vocals; Stefan Kaufmann – drums	none
1988 – 1989	David Reece – lead vocals; Wolf Hoffmann – guitars, backing vocals; Peter Baltes – bass, backing vocals; Stefan Kaufmann – drums	Eat the Heat (1989)
1989	David Reece – lead vocals; Wolf Hoffmann – lead guitar, backing vocals; Jim Stacey – rhythm guitar; Peter Baltes – bass, backing vocals; Stefan Kaufmann – drums	none
1989	David Reece – lead vocals; Wolf Hoffmann – lead guitar, backing vocals; Jim Stacey – rhythm guitar; Peter Baltes – bass, backing vocals; Ken Mary – drums (touring)	none
Band inactive 1989–1992
1992 – 1994	Udo Dirkschneider – lead vocals; Wolf Hoffmann – guitars, backing vocals; Peter Baltes – bass, backing vocals; Stefan Kaufmann – drums	Objection Overruled (1993); Death Row (1994)
1994 – 1995	Udo Dirkschneider – lead vocals; Wolf Hoffmann – guitars, backing vocals; Peter Baltes – bass, backing vocals; Stefan Schwarzmann – drums	Death Row (1994) – two tracks; All Areas: Worldwide (1997)
1995 – 1997	Udo Dirkschneider – lead vocals; Wolf Hoffmann – guitars, backing vocals; Peter Baltes – bass, backing vocals; Michael Cartellone – drums (touring/session)	Predator (1996)
Band inactive 1997–2005
2005	Udo Dirkschneider – lead vocals; Wolf Hoffmann – lead guitar, backing vocals; Herman Frank – rhythm guitar; Peter Baltes – bass, backing vocals; Stefan Schwarzmann – drums	none
Band inactive 2005–2009
May 2009 – December 2014	Mark Tornillo – lead vocals; Wolf Hoffmann – lead guitar, backing vocals; Herman Frank – rhythm guitar; Peter Baltes – bass, backing vocals; Stefan Schwarzmann – drums	Blood of the Nations (2010); Stalingrad (2012); Blind Rage (2014)
December 2014 – April 2015	Mark Tornillo – lead vocals; Wolf Hoffmann – lead guitar, backing vocals; Peter Baltes – bass, backing vocals	none
April 2015 – November 2018	Mark Tornillo – lead vocals; Wolf Hoffmann – lead guitar, backing vocals; Uwe Lulis – rhythm guitar, backing; Peter Baltes – bass, backing vocals vocals; Christopher Williams – drums, backing vocals	Restless and Live (2017); The Rise of Chaos (2017); Symphonic Terror: Live at Wacken 2017 (2018)
November 2018 – April 2019	Mark Tornillo – lead vocals; Wolf Hoffmann – lead guitar, backing vocals; Uwe Lulis – rhythm guitar, backing vocals; Danny Silvestri – bass (touring); Christopher Williams – drums, backing vocals	none
April – November 2019	Mark Tornillo – lead vocals; Wolf Hoffmann – lead guitar, backing vocals; Uwe Lulis – rhythm guitar, backing vocals; Martin Motnik – bass, backing vocals; Christopher Williams – drums, backing vocals	none
November 2019 – September 2025	Mark Tornillo – lead vocals; Wolf Hoffman – lead guitar, backing vocals; Philip Shouse – rhythm and lead guitar, backing vocals; Uwe Lulis – rhythm guitar; Martin Motnik – bass, backing vocals; Christopher Williams – drums, backing vocals	Too Mean to Die (2021); Humanoid (2024)
September 2025 – present	Mark Tornillo – lead vocals; Wolf Hoffman – lead guitar, backing vocals; Philip Shouse – rhythm guitar, backing vocals; Martin Motnik – bass, backing vocals; Christopher Williams – drums, backing vocals	none to date
