= Accept discography =

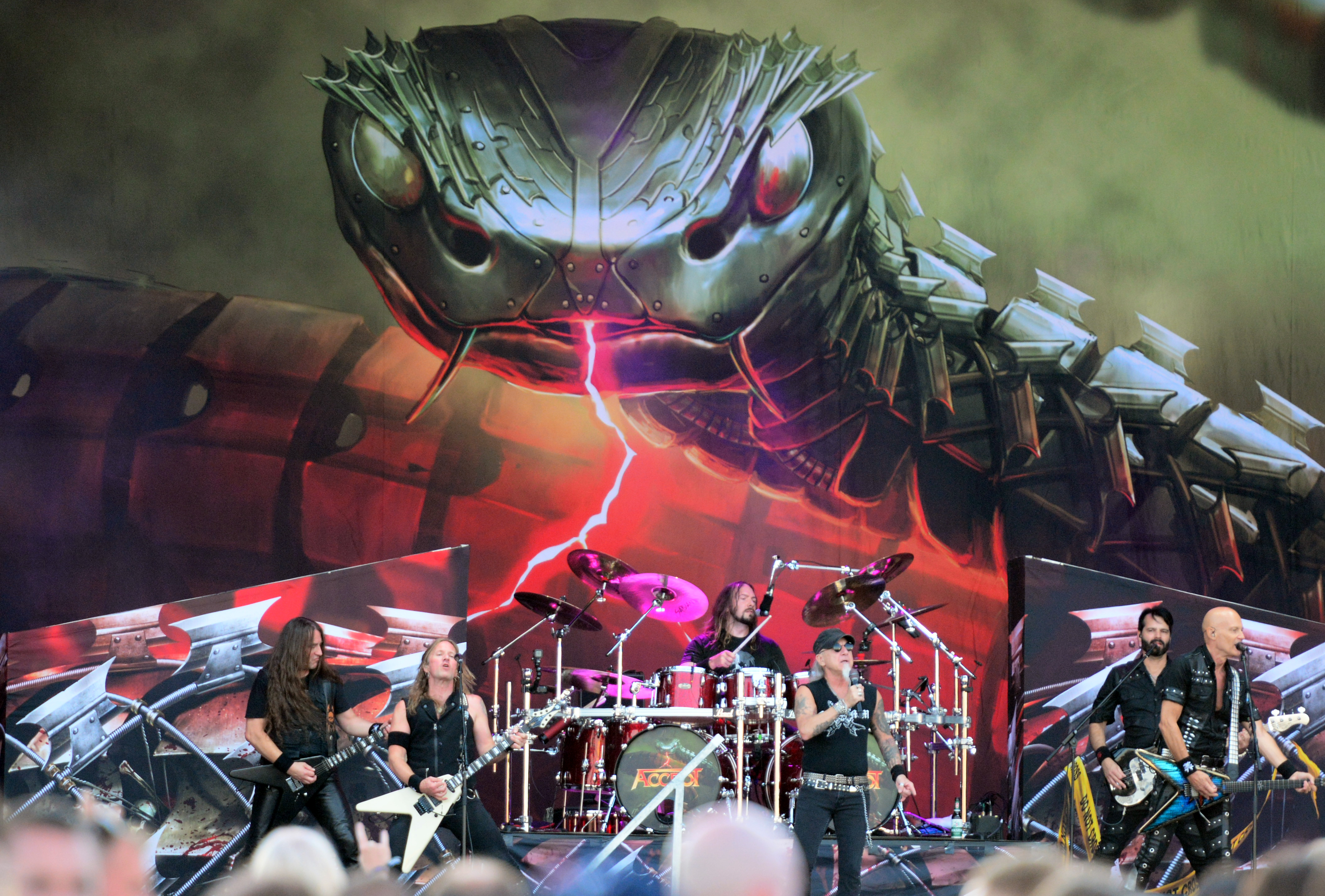
- Accept performing live in 2022
- Studio albums: 17
- Extended plays: 1
- Live albums: 5
- Compilation albums: 9
- Singles: 25
- Video albums: 4
- Music videos: 11

The discography of Accept, a German heavy metal band, consists of 17 studio albums, one collaborative album, five live albums, nine compilations, 25 singles, four video albums and 11 music videos. Formed in Solingen in 1976, with the bands first stable lineup featuring lead vocalist Udo Dirkschneider, lead guitarist Wolf Hoffmann, bassist Peter Baltes, rhythm guitarist Jörg Fischer and drummer Stefan Kaufmann.. The band signed to Brain Records and released their self-titled debut album in 1979, which failed to chart. After Friedrich was replaced by Stefan Kaufmann, I'm a Rebel, Breaker and Restless and Wild (the group's first release after Fischer's departure) followed over the next three years, the last of which gave Accept their debut on the UK Albums Chart when it reached number 98.

The band signed with RCA Records and released Balls to the Wall in 1983, their first album with Fischer's replacement Herman Frank. It was the band's first domestic success, registering at number 59 on the German Albums Chart. The album also charted in the United States and Canada, receiving gold certifications in both regions. With Fischer later returning, the band's commercial recognition increased with their next two releases, as Metal Heart and Russian Roulette gave Accept their first German top 20 and top 10 chart positions, respectively. Dirkschneider was fired in 1987, but the band (with David Reece and without Fischer again) returned in 1989 with Eat the Heat, which peaked at number 15 in Germany. After a final touring cycle, Accept broke up in late 1989.

Reuniting with Dirkschneider, Accept returned in 1992 to record their comeback album Objection Overruled. Released the following year, it reached number 17 on the German Albums Chart. The group's popularity began to reduce in the 1990s, however, as 1994's Death Row peaked at number 32 and 1996's Predator peaked at number 56. Again, the band broke up in 1997. After a brief touring cycle in 2005, Accept reformed in 2009 with Hoffmann, Baltes, Frank joined by returning drummer Stefan Schwarzmann and new vocalist Mark Tornillo. Signed to Nuclear Blast, the band peaked at number 4 with 2010's Blood of the Nations and number 6 with 2012's Stalingrad: Brothers in Death, before achieving their first German Albums Chart number one with Blind Rage, released in 2014.

Accept parted ways with Frank and Schwarzmann in 2014, with their places taken in April 2015 by Uwe Lulis and Christopher Williams, respectively. In 2017 the band reached number 9 in Germany with the live album Restless and Live: Blind Rage Live in Europe 2015, before issuing The Rise of Chaos later in the year and reaching the top three. Another live release, Symphonic Terror: Live at Wacken 2017, also reached the German Albums Chart top 20 in 2018.

== Albums ==
=== Studio albums ===
List of studio albums, with selected chart positions and certifications
Title	Album details	Peak chart positions										Certifications
Title	Album details	GER	AUT	CAN	FIN	FRA	NOR	SWE	SWI	UK	US	Certifications
Accept	Released: 16 January 1979; Label: Brain; Format: LP	—	—	—	—	—	—	—	—	—	—	
I'm a Rebel (titled Accept in the United States)	Released: 2 June 1980; Label: Brain; Formats: LP, CS	—	—	—	—	—	—	—	—	—	—	
Breaker	Released: 16 March 1981; Label: Brain; Formats: LP, CS	—	—	—	—	—	—	—	—	—	—	
Restless and Wild	Released: 2 October 1982; Label: Brain; Formats: LP, CS	—	—	—	—	—	—	7	—	98	—	
Balls to the Wall	Released: 5 December 1983; Label: RCA; Formats: LP, CS	59	—	43	—	—	—	10	—	—	74	MC: Gold; RIAA: Gold
Metal Heart	Released: 4 March 1985; Label: RCA; Formats: CD, LP, CS	13	—	86	—	—	9	4	14	50	94	
Russian Roulette	Released: 21 April 1986; Label: RCA; Formats: CD, LP, CS	5	—	—	—	—	16	9	23	80	114	
Eat the Heat	Released: 11 May 1989; Label: RCA; Formats: CD, LP, CS	15	—	—	—	—	19	26	—	—	139	
Objection Overruled	Released: 1 February 1993; Label: RCA; Formats: CD, CS	17	—	—	—	—	—	21	22	—	—	
Death Row	Released: 1 October 1994; Label: RCA; Formats: CD, LP, CS	32	—	—	—	—	—	27	—	—	—	
Predator	Released: 15 January 1996; Label: RCA; Formats: CD, CS	56	—	—	27	—	—	28	49	—	—	
Blood of the Nations	Released: 20 August 2010; Label: Nuclear Blast; Formats: CD, 2LP, DL	4	19	—	9	72	—	7	15	—	187	
Stalingrad	Released: 6 April 2012; Label: Nuclear Blast; Formats: CD, 2LP, DL	6	70	—	8	77	22	10	17	—	81	
Blind Rage	Released: 15 August 2014; Label: Nuclear Blast; Formats: CD, 2LP, DL	1	18	—	1	48	19	16	9	85	35	
The Rise of Chaos	Released: 4 August 2017; Label: Nuclear Blast; Formats: CD, 2LP, DL	3	13	—	5	96	—	10	4	—	140	
Too Mean to Die	Released: 29 January 2021; Label: Nuclear Blast; Formats: CD, 2LP, DL	2	9	—	4	88	—	7	4	—	—	
Humanoid	Released: 26 April 2024; Label: Napalm; Formats: CD, LP, DL	5	2	—	19	—	—	22	6	—	—	
"—" denotes a release that did not chart or was not issued in that region.

=== Collaboration albums ===
List of collaboration albums, with selected chart positions and certifications
Title	Album details	Peak chart positions										Certifications
Title	Album details	GER	AUT	CAN	FIN	FRA	NOR	SWE	SWI	UK	US	Certifications
Teutonic Titans 1976–2026	Released: 4 September 2026; Label: Napalm; Formats: CD, LP, DL	3	5	—	22	—	—	11	—	—	—	
"—" denotes a release that did not chart or was not issued in that region.

=== Live albums ===
List of live albums, with selected chart positions
Title	Album details	Peak chart positions									
Title	Album details	GER	BEL Fla.	BEL Wal.	FIN	FRA	SWI	UK	US Hard	US Indie	US Rock
Kaizoku-Ban	Released: 1985; Label: RCA; Formats: LP, CS	50	—	—	—	—	—	91	—	—	—
Staying a Life	Released: 21 October 1990; Label: RCA; Formats: 2CD, 2LP, 2CS	—	—	—	—	—	—	—	—	—	—
All Areas – Worldwide	Released: 17 November 1997; Label: GUN; Formats: 2CD, 2LP	—	—	—	—	—	—	—	—	—	—
Restless and Live: Blind Rage Live in Europe 2015	Released: 13 January 2017; Label: Nuclear Blast; Formats: 2CD, 4LP, DL	9	101	74	42	113	81	—	10	18	30
Symphonic Terror: Live at Wacken 2017	Released: 23 November 2018; Label: Nuclear Blast; Formats: 2CD, 3LP, DL	20	—	112	—	—	71	—	—	—	—
"—" denotes a release that did not chart or was not issued in that region.

=== Extended plays ===
List of extended plays
Title	Album details
Rich & Famous	Released: 2002; Label: Drakkar; Formats: CD

=== Compilations ===
List of compilation albums
Title	Album details
Best of Accept	Released: 1983; Label: Brain; Formats: LP, CS
Midnight Highway (released in North America only)	Released: 1983; Label: PVC; Formats: LP, CS
Hungry Years	Released: 1986; Label: Metronome; Formats: LP, CS
The Collection	Released: 1991; Label: Castle; Formats: CD, CS
No Substitutes (released in the United States only)	Released: 1992; Label: Sony Special Products; Formats: CD, CS
Restless: The Best	Released: 1994; Label: Brain; Formats: CD, CS
Steel Glove: The Collection	Released: January 1996; Label: Castle; Format: CD
Hot & Slow: Classics, Rocks 'n' Ballads	Released: 28 November 2000; Label: RCA; Format: CD
Playlist: The Very Best of Accept	Released: 29 January 2013; Label: Epic, Legacy; Formats: CD, DL

== Singles ==
List of singles, showing year released and album name
Title	Year	Album
"Lady Lou"	1979	Accept
"I'm a Rebel"	1980	I'm a Rebel
"Burning"	1981	Breaker
"Breaker"	1981	Breaker
"Starlight"	1981	Breaker
"Fast as a Shark"	1983	Restless and Wild
"Restless and Wild"	1983	Restless and Wild
"Balls to the Wall"	1983	Balls to the Wall
"Midnight Mover"	1985	Metal Heart
"Screaming for a Love-Bite"	1985	Metal Heart
"T.V. War"	1986	Russian Roulette
"Generation Clash"	1989	Eat the Heat
"I Don't Wanna Be Like You"	1993	Objection Overruled
"All or Nothing"	1993	Objection Overruled
"Slaves to Metal"	1993	Objection Overruled
"Bad Habits Die Hard"	1994	Death Row
"Hard Attack"	1996	Predator
"The Abyss"	2010	Blood of the Nations
"Stampede"	2014	Blind Rage
"Final Journey"	2014	Blind Rage
"Restless and Wild" (live)	2016	Restless and Live
"The Rise of Chaos"	2017	The Rise of Chaos
"Koolaid"	2017	The Rise of Chaos
"Balls to the Wall" (live)	2018	Symphonic Terror: Live at Wacken 2017
"Breaker" (live)	2018	Symphonic Terror: Live at Wacken 2017
"Life's a Bitch"	2019	Life's a Bitch
"Restless and Wild" (live)	2019	Life's a Bitch
"The Undertaker"	2020	Too Mean to Die
"Too Mean to Die"	2020	Too Mean to Die
"Zombie Apocalypse"	2021	Too Mean to Die

== Videos ==
=== Video albums ===
List of video albums
Title	Album details
Staying a Life	Released: 1991; Label: PolyGram; Formats: VHS, LaserDisc
Metal Blast from the Past	Released: 22 July 2002; Label: BMG-Ariola; Format: DVD (includes a CD of previously unreleased audio tracks)
Restless and Live: Blind Rage Live in Europe 2015	Released: 13 January 2017; Label: Nuclear Blast; Formats: DVD, Blu-ray
Symphonic Terror: Live at Wacken 2017	Released: 23 November 2018; Label: Nuclear Blast; Formats: DVD, Blu-ray

=== Music videos ===
List of music videos, showing year released and director(s) name
Title	Year	Director(s)	Ref.
"I'm a Rebel"	1980	unknown	
"Balls to the Wall"	1984	Julien Temple	
"Midnight Mover"	1985	Zbigniew Rybczyński	
"Generation Clash"	1989	unknown	
"Protectors of Terror"	1993	unknown	
"Slaves to Metal"	1993	unknown	
"Death Row"	1994	unknown	
"Teutonic Terror"	2010	Dave Blass	
"Pandemic"	2011	Dave Blass	
"Stampede"	2014	Dave Blass	
"The Rise of Chaos"	2017	Scott Diussa	
"The Undertaker"	2020	unknown	
