= Restless and Live =

Restless and Live (Blind Rage – Live in Europe 2015)

Live album by Accept
- Released: 13 January 2017
- Recorded: 15–18 July 2015
- Genre: Heavy metal
- Length: 2:24:56
- Label: Nuclear Blast

Accept chronology
Blind Rage (2014)	Restless and Live (Blind Rage – Live in Europe 2015) (2017)	The Rise of Chaos (2017)

Restless and Live, formally titled Restless and Live (Blind Rage – Live in Europe 2015), is a double live album and concert film by Accept and was released 13 January 2017. The concert was recorded at the Bang Your Head!!! 2015 festival in Balingen, Germany. The album was released in multiple formats, including a 2-CD digipack, a 4-LP release, and a DVD and Blu-Ray version of the concert film was released both separately and along with the 2-CD version of the album.

It is Accept's first live album to feature singer Mark Tornillo, and their first album of any kind to feature both guitarist Uwe Lulis and drummer Christopher Williams.

== Track listing ==
Disc one
No.	Title	Album	Length
1.	"Stampede"	Blind Rage	5:53
2.	"Stalingrad"	Stalingrad	6:02
3.	"Hellfire"	Stalingrad	5:35
4.	"London Leatherboys"	Balls to the Wall	4:32
5.	"Living for Tonite"	Metal Heart	3:40
6.	"200 Years"	Blind Rage	4:34
7.	"Demon's Night"	Restless and Wild	4:49
8.	"Dying Breed"	Blind Rage	6:26
9.	"Final Journey"	Blind Rage	5:17
10.	"From the Ashes We Rise"	Blind Rage	5:51
11.	"Losers and Winners"	Balls to the Wall	4:20
12.	"No Shelter"	Blood of the Nations	7:24
13.	"Shadow Soldiers"	Stalingrad	6:08
14.	"Midnight Mover"	Metal Heart	3:25
Total length:			1:13:56

Disc two
No.	Title	Album	Length
1.	"Starlight"	Breaker	3:52
2.	"Restless and Wild"	Restless and Wild	4:28
3.	"Son of a Bitch"	Breaker	2:59
4.	"Pandemic"	Blood of the Nations	6:17
5.	"Dark Side of My Heart"	Blind Rage	4:47
6.	"The Curse"	Blind Rage	6:09
7.	"Flash Rockin' Man"	Restless and Wild	4:23
8.	"Bulletproof"	Objection Overruled	5:58
9.	"Fall of the Empire"	Blind Rage	5:40
10.	"Fast as a Shark"	Restless and Wild	4:40
11.	"Metal Heart"	Metal Heart	6:44
12.	"Teutonic Terror"	Blood of the Nations	5:17
13.	"Balls to the Wall"	Balls to the Wall	9:46
Total length:			1:11:00

== Credits ==
Accept

- Mark Tornillo – vocals
- Wolf Hoffmann – guitar
- Uwe Lulis – guitar
- Peter Baltes – bass
- Christopher Williams – drums

Additional personnel

- Andy Sneap – mixing
- Arne Lakenmacher – recording
- Timo Pollinger – artwork, layout

== Charts ==
Chart (2017)	Peak position
Belgian Albums (Ultratop Flanders)	101
Belgian Albums (Ultratop Wallonia)	74
German Albums (Offizielle Top 100)	9
Finnish Albums (Suomen virallinen lista)	42
French Albums (SNEP)	113
Hungarian Albums (MAHASZ)	35
Swiss Albums (Schweizer Hitparade)	81
UK Independent Albums (OCC)	24
UK Rock & Metal Albums (OCC)	13
US Independent Albums (Billboard)	18
