= All Areas – Worldwide =

Live album by Accept
- Released: November 17, 1997; January 13, 1998 (USA & Japan)
- Recorded: 1993–1994
- Genre: Heavy metal
- Label: GUN; CMC International (The Final Chapter)
- Producer: Stefan Kaufmann

Accept chronology
Predator (1996)	All Areas – Worldwide (1997)	Blood of the Nations (2010)

The Final Chapter CD cover

Professional ratings
Review scores
Source	Rating
AllMusic	3.5/5 stars
AllMusic	2.5/5 stars
Collector's Guide to Heavy Metal	8/10

All Areas – Worldwide is a double live album by Accept. It was released in Japan and the United States under the title The Final Chapter in 1998.

The first 14 tracks were recorded while Accept toured supporting their 1993 Objection Overruled release, while the final six tracks were recorded during support of their 1994 Death Row offering.

== Track listing ==
Disc one
No.	Title	Length
1.	"Starlight"	5:23
2.	"London Leatherboys"	4:42
3.	"I Don't Wanna Be Like You"	4:29
4.	"Breaker"	4:49
5.	"Slaves to Metal"	5:10
6.	"Princess of the Dawn"	10:45
7.	"Restless and Wild"	2:46
8.	"Son of a Bitch"	3:26
9.	"This One's for You"	4:08
10.	"Bulletproof"	6:17
11.	"Too High to Get It Right"	5:44
Total length:		57:43

Disc two
No.	Title	Length
1.	"Metal Heart"	6:19
2.	"Fast as a Shark"	3:50
3.	"Balls to the Wall"	11:11
4.	"What Else"	5:27
5.	"Sodom and Gomorra"	6:39
6.	"The Beast Inside"	6:25
7.	"Bad Habits Die Hard"	4:53
8.	"Stone Evil"	4:32
9.	"Death Row"	6:03
Total length:		55:19

== Credits ==
- Peter Baltes – bass guitar
- Udo Dirkschneider – vocals
- Wolf Hoffmann – guitars
- Stefan Kaufmann – drums, producer, mixing
- Stefan Schwarzmann – drums on tracks 4–9 on disc two
