= Balls to the wall =

Balls to the wall is an idiom that refers to a maximum commitment or effort; e.g. full throttle.

Balls to the wall also refers to:

- Balls to the Wall (album), an album by the German heavy-metal band Accept
  - "Balls to the Wall" (song), the title song and lead single from the album
- Balls to the Wall (film), a 2011 American comedy film
