= The Rise of Chaos =

Studio album by Accept
- Released: 4 August 2017
- Recorded: 2016–2017
- Genre: Heavy metal
- Length: 46:18
- Label: Nuclear Blast
- Producer: Andy Sneap

Accept chronology
Restless and Live (2017)	The Rise of Chaos (2017)	Too Mean to Die (2021)

Singles from The Rise of Chaos
- 1. "The Rise of Chaos" Released: 2 June 2017

The Rise of Chaos is the 15th studio album by German heavy metal band Accept, released on 4 August 2017. This is the first Accept album with guitarist Uwe Lulis and drummer Christopher Williams, replacing Herman Frank and Stefan Schwarzmann, respectively. It is also their final studio album to feature bassist Peter Baltes, who left Accept in November 2018. Like their previous three studio albums, The Rise of Chaos was produced by Andy Sneap, making it the band's fourth collaboration with him. Guitarist Wolf Hoffmann has stated that the album's title refers to the human-caused chaos in the world.

== Background ==
About four months after the release of Blind Rage (2014), it was announced that guitarist Herman Frank and drummer Stefan Schwarzmann had parted ways with Accept. They were later replaced by Uwe Lulis and Christopher Williams, respectively.

On 5 June 2015, prior to the band's performance at the South Park festival in Tampere, Finland, bassist Peter Baltes told Kaaos TV that Accept planned to begin work on a new album after the conclusion of the Blind Rage tour. Asked in a July 2015 interview about the band's future, guitarist Wolf Hoffmann replied, "We will continue for a few more weeks, this run of touring, and then we'll take a little break and come back in the fall, but we're pretty much wrapping up the Blind Rage tour at this point; it's the very last phase of this whole cycle. And then the next album will have to be written and to be recorded, and how long that's gonna take and when that's all gonna happen, who knows? But it'll happen; that's all I know." Hoffmann stated that the new album would be released around July or August 2017. Like their previous three albums, the album was produced by Andy Sneap, making it Accept's fourth collaboration with him. On 16 April 2017 Accept announced that the album, titled The Rise of Chaos, would be released on 4 August. On 2 June the band released title track single digitally via Nuclear Blast accompanied by new artwork.

== Critical reception ==
Professional ratings
Review scores
Source	Rating
AllMusic	3.5/5 stars
Rock Hard (FR)	7.5/10 stars
Metal Hammer (GER)	6/7 stars
Metallian (FR)	4.5/6 stars

The Rise of Chaos has received generally positive reviews from critics. AllMusic writer James Christopher Monger gave the album a rating of three-and-a-half stars out of five, and wrote, "Internationally, Accept's particular brand of workmanlike metal, a steely mix of muscular AC/DC-styled riffage and Motörhead-esque bad attitude, never truly went out of style, and The Rise of Chaos plays to those strengths via a ten-track onslaught that shows little in the way of innovation, yet never loses sight of the end goal, which is to rock with extreme prejudice."

The album was honored with a 2017 Metal Storm Award for Best Heavy Metal/Melodic Album. It was also nominated for a German Metal Hammer Award for Best Album in 2018, but lost to Powerwolf's The Sacrament of Sin.

== Track listing ==
Original Edition
No.	Title	Length
1.	"Die by the Sword"	5:00
2.	"Hole in the Head"	4:01
3.	"The Rise of Chaos"	5:16
4.	"Koolaid"	4:58
5.	"No Regrets"	4:20
6.	"Analog Man"	4:10
7.	"What's Done Is Done"	4:08
8.	"Worlds Colliding"	4:28
9.	"Carry the Weight"	4:33
10.	"Race to Extinction"	5:24
Total length:		46:18

== Personnel ==
Accept

- Mark Tornillo – vocals
- Wolf Hoffmann – guitar
- Uwe Lulis – guitar
- Peter Baltes – bass
- Christopher Williams – drums

Additional personnel

- Andy Sneap – production, mixing, mastering
- Gyula Havancsak – artwork, layout

== Charts ==
Chart (2017)	Peak position
Austrian Albums (Ö3 Austria)	13
Belgian Albums (Ultratop Flanders)	36
Belgian Albums (Ultratop Wallonia)	25
Czech Albums (ČNS IFPI)	5
Finnish Albums (Suomen virallinen lista)	5
French Albums (SNEP)	96
German Albums (Offizielle Top 100)	3
Hungarian Albums (MAHASZ)	20
Polish Albums (ZPAV)	26
Scottish Albums (Official Charts)	36
Spanish Albums (PROMUSICAE)	31
Swedish Albums (Sverigetopplistan)	10
Swiss Albums (Schweizer Hitparade)	4
UK Independent Albums (Official Charts)	5
UK Rock & Metal Albums (Official Charts)	4
US Billboard 200	140
US Independent Albums (Billboard)	4
US Top Hard Rock Albums (Billboard)	9
US Top Rock Albums (Billboard)	29
US Indie Store Album Sales (Billboard)	2
