= Objection overruled (disambiguation) =

Objection Overruled is a 1993 heavy metal album by the German band Accept. The phrase may also refer to:

- "Objection overruled", a statement by a judge who disagrees with a formal protest raised in court during a trial.
- "Objection Overruled" (song), a 1990 thrash metal song by the US band Exodus
