= Insidiöus Törment =

Insidiöus Törment, also referred to as IT or (misspelled) Insidious Torment, is a Danish heavy metal band with Soviet roots. The heavy metal umlaut in their band name, a usually purely decorative device, is actually pronounced. In heavy metal, a musical genre that is sometimes described as "proto-fascist", the group is also known for being one of the few overtly socialist bands, along with some other notable examples, such as Accept. Like Accept in the lyrics to "Balls to the Wall", Insidiöus Törment also call for the oppressed to rise and rebel in such songs as "Metal Balls", "The Enticer" and "Call to Arms".

== History ==
The band had their biggest success in the late 1980s, culminating in The Iron Curtain Tour in 1989, when they played big stadium concerts in Moscow (Gorky Park), Berlin, Moldova, and Bratislava among other places. Their biggest hit was titled "Great Cocks of Rock and Roll". After the fall of the Berlin wall the band sought success in the rest of Europe. This ended in failure, after a fallout with the fans, during which the lead singer Jake "the Scream" was infuriated for being taken as kitsch or a comedy band, and was quoted saying "I'm very unhappy for not being taken seriously. Our music is great art, but people of the west think only western music is great. I'll not be clown of capitalism!"

After the fallout with most European fans, the band withdrew from public for a number of years before making a second bid for success beginning in the late 1990s. The band has called this “The New Wave of Traditional Heavy Metal", with mottos such as “Evil – Sexy” and “Heavy or Die”.

The Orange Revolution of Ukraine sparked the band's come-back in Ukraine, as the band played in Kyiv every night three weeks straight supporting the protesters.

Today the band has a strong fan base in the former USSR but are still struggling to achieve recognition in the rest of Europe, where the band have only attained a cult status among liberals - mainly university students.

The Encyclopedia Metallum lists them as a Danish heavy metal band. However, in the description of the band's Facebook-based fanclub, they are listed as residing in Schwartzdorf, Liechtenstein. It appears that their more recent exploits have concentrated on the city of Århus, Denmark. In April 2009, they headlined a concert in Århus. In a 2005 interview, they talk about their problems touring in Denmark and their search for a manager.

== Band members ==
- Jake "the Scream" – lead singer
- Eik "Killer" – guitar
- Rëd Rock – guitar
- Sonny von Rostock – Sword
- Olaf Jan "OJ" Jantzen – bass
- Laszlo "Donkey" Wickitz – drums

== Past band members ==
- Carlos "The Buff" Lorenzo - drums, guitar, keyboards
- Mortor Pates - lead guitar, bass guitar
- Gölem - Chains, lead guitar, vocals
- Dave "Steel" Steel - sword
- Ronnie Gamboa - Drums, drum machines, programming

== Discography ==
The Seidenburg Takes (bootleg)

Music:

1. Hey, Hey, Hey, Heavy Metal (3:51)
2. Dinösaurs öf Röck (5:09)
3. I Am Thör (4:46)
4. Shöw Me Yöur "Wurst" (3:39)
5. Space Marine Death Machine (4:18)
6. Spanish Leather and Steel (6:37)
7. The Enticer (5:42)
8. Tötal Viking Pöwer (5:01)
9. The Kraken (8:52)
10. Merry XXX-Mas tö the Wörld (5:26)

Published in 2012 (recorded in 2005).

Heavy Metal

Music:

1. Your Ass Belongs to Me
2. Metal Balls
3. Who Calls the Shots
4. Hey, hey, hey Heavy Metal
5. Enticer (Live)
6. Jack-in-a-box (Live)

Videos:

1. Hey, hey, hey Heavy Metal
2. Metal Balls

Published in 2009.

The Rock, The Claw and the Steel

Music:

1. Moon Trooper, Trooper of the Moon
2. The Duke of Liechtgenstein
3. The Great Cocks of Rock and Roll
4. Prometheus

Videos:

1. Great Cocks video
2. Cocks Live video

Published in 2006.

Live at Die Budi Kate

1. Introduction
2. Call to Arms
3. Prometheus
4. Wolf Cry
5. The Duke of Lichtenstein
6. Der Enticer
7. The God of Casual Slaughter
8. Break Out and Rage
9. Space Marine Death Machine
10. Great Cocks of Rock ‘n’ Roll
11. Heed the Call

Published in 2003.

The Moors of Harshness

1. Call to Arms
2. WolfCry
3. The Enticer
4. Heed The Call

Published 2001. Reissued in 2004 as promo entitled: "Gold Promo Edition V".
