= Loyal to None =

Studio album by Herman Frank
- Released: 27 February 2009
- Recorded: March–June 2008 at ARENA 20 Studio, Hannover, Germany
- Genre: Heavy Metal
- Length: 45:53
- Label: Metal Heaven
- Producer: Herman Frank

Herman Frank chronology
Loyal to None (2009)	Right in the Guts (2012)

Loyal to None is the first solo album of German heavy metal guitarist Herman Frank (Accept, Victory). It was recorded and mixed between March and June 2008 in Frank's own ARENA 20-studio in Hanover, Germany, and features Jioti Parcharidis (Victory, Human Fortress) on vocals, Peter Pichl (Running Wild) on bass and Stefan Schwarzmann (Accept) on drums. The album's title refers to Frank releasing a record under his own name for the first time. His music had always appeared under a band's name up to then, but this time Frank wanted to be "loyal to none", as he explains in an interview.

== Tracks ==
1. "Moon II" - 5:26
2. "7 Stars" - 4:18
3. "Father Buries Son" - 3:59
4. "Heal Me" - 5:05
5. "Hero" - 5:23
6. "Kill the King" - 4:45
7. "Down to the Valley" - 4:42
8. "Bastard Legion" - 4:05
9. "Metal Gods" - 4:11
10. "Welcome to Hell" - 3:55

== Credits ==
- Jioti Parcharidis - Vocals
- Peter Pichl - Bass
- Stefan Schwarzmann - Drums
- Herman Frank - Guitars

Additional backing vocals by Martina Frank, Ossy "Osbourne" Pfeiffer and Jürgen Wulfes.
