= Eat the Heat =

Studio album by Accept
- Released: 11 May 1989
- Recorded: September 1988–January 1989
- Studio: Dierks Studios, Stommeln, Cologne, Germany
- Genre: Heavy metal; glam metal
- Length: 53:11
- Label: RCA/BMG Ariola (Europe); Epic (US)
- Producer: Dieter Dierks

Accept chronology
Russian Roulette (1986)	Eat the Heat (1989)	Staying a Life (1990)

Singles from Eat the Heat
- 1. "Generation Clash" Released: July 1989 (EU)

European edition cover

Eat the Heat is the eighth studio album by German heavy metal band Accept, released in 1989. It is the band's only album with vocalist David Reece. It was recorded at Dierks Studios in Cologne from September 1988 to January 1989. Although Jim Stacey is presented as rhythm guitar player in the album lineup, the album credits also state that all guitar work on the album was played by Wolf Hoffmann. Stacey did perform second guitar live with the band.

Until 2010's Blood of the Nations, this was Accept's only album without Udo Dirkschneider as lead vocalist. U.D.O. contributes with crowd vocals on "Turn the Wheel". U.D.O. has also covered the song "X-T-C" on the 2001 compilation A Tribute to Accept II. Accept later recorded "Generation Clash II" based on "Generation Clash" with Udo Dirkschneider on vocals for their 1994 album Death Row. U.D.O. will still regularly perform tracks from this album, including "X-T-C".

Professional ratings
Review scores
Source	Rating
AllMusic	1.5/5 stars
Collector's Guide to Heavy Metal	4/10
The Rolling Stone Album Guide	2/5 stars

== Reception ==
The Rolling Stone Album Guide wrote that "though the album delivers much of the punch of its predecessors, the songs seem flat by comparison."

== Track listings ==
All lyrics and music written by Accept and Deaffy.

European version, LP

Side one
No.	Title	Length
1.	"X-T-C"	4:25
2.	"Generation Clash"	6:22
3.	"Chain Reaction"	4:38
4.	"Love Sensation"	4:42
5.	"Turn the Wheel"	5:24

Side two
No.	Title	Length
6.	"Prisoner"	4:50
7.	"Mistreated"	6:45
8.	"Stand 4 What U R"	4:05
9.	"Hellhammer"	5:29
10.	"D-Train"	4:24
Total length:		53:11

U.S. version

Side one
No.	Title	Length
1.	"X-T-C"	4:25
2.	"Prisoner"	4:50
3.	"Love Sensation"	4:42
4.	"Chain Reaction"	4:38
5.	"Stand 4 What U R"	4:05
6.	"D-Train"	4:24

Side two
No.	Title	Length
7.	"Generation Clash"	6:22
8.	"Turn the Wheel"	5:24
9.	"Hellhammer"	5:29
10.	"Mistreated"	8:52
Total length:		53:11

2014 remastered version

No.	Title	Length
1.	"X-T-C"	4:25
2.	"Generation Clash"	6:22
3.	"Chain Reaction"	4:38
4.	"Love Sensation"	4:42
5.	"Turn the Wheel"	5:24
6.	"Hellhammer"	5:30
7.	"Prisoner"	4:50
8.	"I Can't Believe in You"	4:48
9.	"Mistreated"	8:53
10.	"Stand 4 What U R"	4:05
11.	"Break the Ice"	4:12
12.	"D-Train"	4:24
Total length:		62:14

European and Japanese, CD released, bonus tracks
No.	Title	Length
1.	"I Can't Believe in You"	4:48
2.	"Break the Ice"	4:12
Total length:		62:14

2014 bonus track
No.	Title	Length
1.	"Generation Clash" (Single Version)	4:25
Total length:		66:39

== Personnel ==
Band members

- David Reece – vocals
- Wolf Hoffmann – guitars
- Peter Baltes – bass
- Stefan Kaufmann – drums

Additional musicians

- Udo Dirkschneider - backing vocals on "Stand 4 What U R"
- Jacky Virgil – backing vocals on "Chain Reaction"
- Mark Dodson – crowd vocals on "Turn the Wheel"

Production

- Dieter Dierks – producer, engineer, mixing, arrangements with Accept
- Topo – mixing, assistant engineer
- Norbert Gutzmann – technician
- Bob Ludwig – mastering at Masterdisk, New York
- Gaby "Deaffy" Hauke – management, cover idea
- George Chin – cover photo
- Ashley Kramer – back photo
- Hentschel Grafic Service – cover design

== Supporting tour ==
The Eat the Heat tour consisted of David Reece on vocals, Wolf Hoffmann on lead guitar, Peter Baltes on bass, Stefan Kaufmann on drums, and Jim Stacey (ex-Break Point) on rhythm guitar. The first leg of the tour consisted of the band headlining at small clubs around the U.S. for about two months. Kaufmann sustained a back injury during this period, and was replaced by House of Lords drummer Ken Mary. Accept then began a North American act with W.A.S.P. and Metal Church. The tour overall was a disappointment, plagued with poor attendance numbers and a failure to draw the American crowds that the band had hoped to appeal to with this new lineup. A rumored behind-stage fight at the Vic Theater in Chicago between Reece and Baltes led to the band splitting up, and the tour was subsequently cancelled.

== Charts ==
Chart (1989)	Peak position
Finnish Albums (The Official Finnish Charts)	25
German Albums (Offizielle Top 100)	15
Japanese Albums (Oricon)	87
Norwegian Albums (VG-lista)	19
Swedish Albums (Sverigetopplistan)	26
US Billboard 200	139
