= Kaizoku-Ban =

EP (live) by Accept
- Released: 1985
- Recorded: 19 September 1985
- Venue: Aichi-ken Kinrou Kaikan, Nagoya, Japan
- Genre: Heavy metal
- Length: 29:21
- Label: RCA (Europe); Portrait (US)
- Producer: Accept

Accept chronology
Metal Heart (1985)	Kaizoku-Ban (1985)	Russian Roulette (1986)

Live in Japan
- Cover of the 1992 Live in Japan reissue

Professional ratings
Review scores
Source	Rating
AllMusic	2/5 stars

Kaizoku-Ban is a live EP by German heavy metal band Accept. It was recorded in Nagoya, Japan, on 19 September 1985, and released on vinyl the same year. It was later re-released as Live in Japan in 1992. Though this is an official release, the title (海賊版) translates as "Pirate Edition" or "Bootleg". The cassette tape version of this release had the unusual feature of having all six songs recorded on both sides. Because of the duration of the six songs, it was feasible to release it this way. All six songs are available as bonus tracks on the 2002 BMG remasters of Balls to the Wall, Metal Heart, and Russian Roulette.

== Track listing ==
Music and lyrics by Accept and Deaffy.

Side one
No.	Title	Length
1.	"Metal Heart"	5:23
2.	"Screaming for a Love-Bite"	4:24
3.	"Up to the Limit"	4:59

Side two
No.	Title	Length
4.	"Head Over Heels"	5:58
5.	"Love Child"	4:44
6.	"Living for Tonite"	3:53
Total length:		29:21

== Credits ==
Band members

- Udo Dirkschneider – vocals
- Wolf Hoffmann – guitars
- Jörg Fischer – guitars
- Peter Baltes – bass guitar
- Stefan Kaufmann – drums

Production

- Mikio Takamatsu – sound engineer
- Bobby Cohen – mixing

== Charts ==
Chart (1985)	Peak position
Finnish Albums (The Official Finnish Charts)	9
German Albums (Offizielle Top 100)	50
UK Albums (OCC)	91
