= Jim Stacey =

- Born: Southend-on-Sea, Essex, England
- Genres: Heavy metal
- Occupation: Guitarist

Jim Stacey (born in Southend-on-Sea, Essex, England) is a British guitarist. As a guitarist he's best known as a former member of the German heavy metal band Accept.

== Career ==
Stacey was a member of the German band Break Point and played on their only album First Serving in 1981. He joined Accept during 1989. In that year, Accept released their eighth studio album, Eat the Heat. Although Stacey appears on the album's front cover, all the guitar work on the album was played by Wolf Hoffmann. Jim Stacey did perform second guitar live with the band.

Stacey was responsible for the layout design and package design of the Nashville Pussy debut album Let Them Eat Pussy (1998).

He was one of the composers of Kevin Henderson's album Kentucky Bound (2005).

== Discography ==
Year	Album name & artist	Format	Credits / Notes
1981	First Serving - Break Point	LP	Bass, Acoustic Guitar, Backing vocals
1992	Mutter Horcht An Deiner Tür - Die Schröders	LP	Guitarist on the title track
1996	Sunset cruise - Olaf Jung	CD	Bass on tracks 1, 2, 4, 5, 7, 11, 12
1998	Let Them Eat Pussy - Nashville Pussy	CD, Cassette	Layout design and package design
2003	Shining Black - The Best Of Tarot - Tarot	Compilation 2CD	Unknown on the track Generation Clash
2005	Kentucky Bound - Kevin Henderson	CD	Composer
