= Blood of the Nations =

Studio album by Accept
- Released: 20 August 2010
- Recorded: November 2009 – January 2010
- Studio: Backstage Studio, Derbyshire, England
- Genre: Heavy metal
- Length: 1:12:30
- Label: Nuclear Blast
- Producer: Andy Sneap

Accept chronology
| All Areas – Worldwide (1997) | Blood of the Nations (2010) | Stalingrad (2012) |

Singles from Blood of the Nations
- 1. "The Abyss" Released: 21 May 2010

Blood of the Nations is the twelfth studio album by German heavy metal band Accept. It is the band's first studio recording since 1996's Predator and the first album to feature vocalist Mark Tornillo and drummer Stefan Schwarzmann. It is the first Accept album without Udo Dirkschneider on lead vocals since Eat the Heat (1989), and the band's first album to feature guitarist Herman Frank since Balls to the Wall (1983).

== Reception ==
Professional ratings
Review scores
| Source | Rating |
|---|---|
| About.com | 4/5 stars |
| AllMusic | 3.5/5 stars |
| Blabbermouth.net | 8.5/10 |
| Brave Words & Bloody Knuckles | 8.5/10 |
| Classic Rock | 4/5 stars |
| Metal Hammer (GER) | 6/7 |
| Rock Hard | 9.0/10 |

Since its release, Blood of the Nations has been met with positive reviews. Reviewer Scott Alisoglu of Blabbermouth.net reviewed the album positively saying that Blood of the Nations "is the shot in the arm that fans of traditional heavy metal needed", and gave the album 8.5 out of 10. The album also received a positive review from musicreview.co.za, with reviewer Sergio Pereira saying that "This isn't about 3-minute radio-friendly singles, Blood of the Nations is about metal – cold hard metal", and noting that minute-long solos, such as the one in the album track "Pandemic", are rare in current music.

Blood of the Nations debuted at number four on the German albums chart, making it Accept's first highest chart position since Russian Roulette (1986) and their second highest overall. Their 2014 album Blind Rage would later debut at number one. It was also Accept's first album to enter the Billboard 200 since Eat the Heat (1989), though it peaked at number 187, making it the band's lowest chart position to date.

=== Accolades ===
In 2010, The Dinosaur Rock Guitar forum honored Blood of the Nations with a Dino award for "Album of the Year". The album won two Metal Storm Awards that same year, when it was voted Best Heavy Metal Album and Biggest Surprise.

The album was voted the "#1 Comeback Album" in a 2013 VH1 poll. Also in 2013, Metal Shock Finland declared it "The Best Shocking Comeback Album".

At the German edition of the Metal Hammer Awards show in 2011, the song "Teutonic Terror" won the "Metal Anthem" award.

== Track list ==
All tracks are written by Peter Baltes, Wolf Hoffmann, and Mark Tornillo except where noted.

Original Edition
| No. | Title | Writer(s) | Length |
|---|---|---|---|
| 1. | "Beat the Bastards" | | 5:25 |
| 2. | "Teutonic Terror" | | 5:15 |
| 3. | "The Abyss" | | 6:50 |
| 4. | "Blood of the Nations" | | 5:39 |
| 5. | "Shades of Death" | | 7:31 |
| 6. | "Locked and Loaded" | | 4:29 |
| 7. | "Time Machine" | | 5:25 |
| 8. | "Kill The Pain" | | 5:47 |
| 9. | "Rolling Thunder" | Herman Frank; Tornillo | 4:53 |
| 10. | "Pandemic" | | 5:37 |
| 11. | "New World Comin'" | | 4:57 |
| 12. | "No Shelter" | | 6:04 |
| 13. | "Bucket Full of Hate" | | 5:08 |

Bonus Track
| No. | Title | Length |
|---|---|---|
| 14. | "Land of the Free" | 4:51 |

== Personnel ==
Accept

- Mark Tornillo – vocals
- Wolf Hoffmann – guitar
- Herman Frank – guitar
- Peter Baltes – bass
- Stefan Schwarzmann – drums

Additional personnel

- Andy Sneap – production, engineering, mixing, mastering
- Marc Whitaker – cover and package design
- Wolf Hoffman – cover and band photography
- Melo Mafali – string arrangements on "Shades of Death" and "Kill The Pain"

== Charts ==
| Chart (2010) | Peak position |
|---|---|
| Austrian Albums (Ö3 Austria) | 19 |
| Belgian Albums (Ultratop Wallonia) | 59 |
| Czech Albums (ČNS IFPI) | 27 |
| Finnish Albums (Suomen virallinen lista) | 9 |
| French Albums (SNEP) | 72 |
| German Albums (Offizielle Top 100) | 4 |
| Hungarian Albums (MAHASZ) | 7 |
| Japanese Albums (Oricon) | 74 |
| Spanish Albums (Promusicae) | 78 |
| Swedish Albums (Sverigetopplistan) | 7 |
| Swiss Albums (Schweizer Hitparade) | 15 |
| US Billboard 200 | 187 |
| US Independent Albums (Billboard) | 41 |
| US Top Hard Rock Albums (Billboard) | 19 |
