= David Reece =

American heavy metal singer

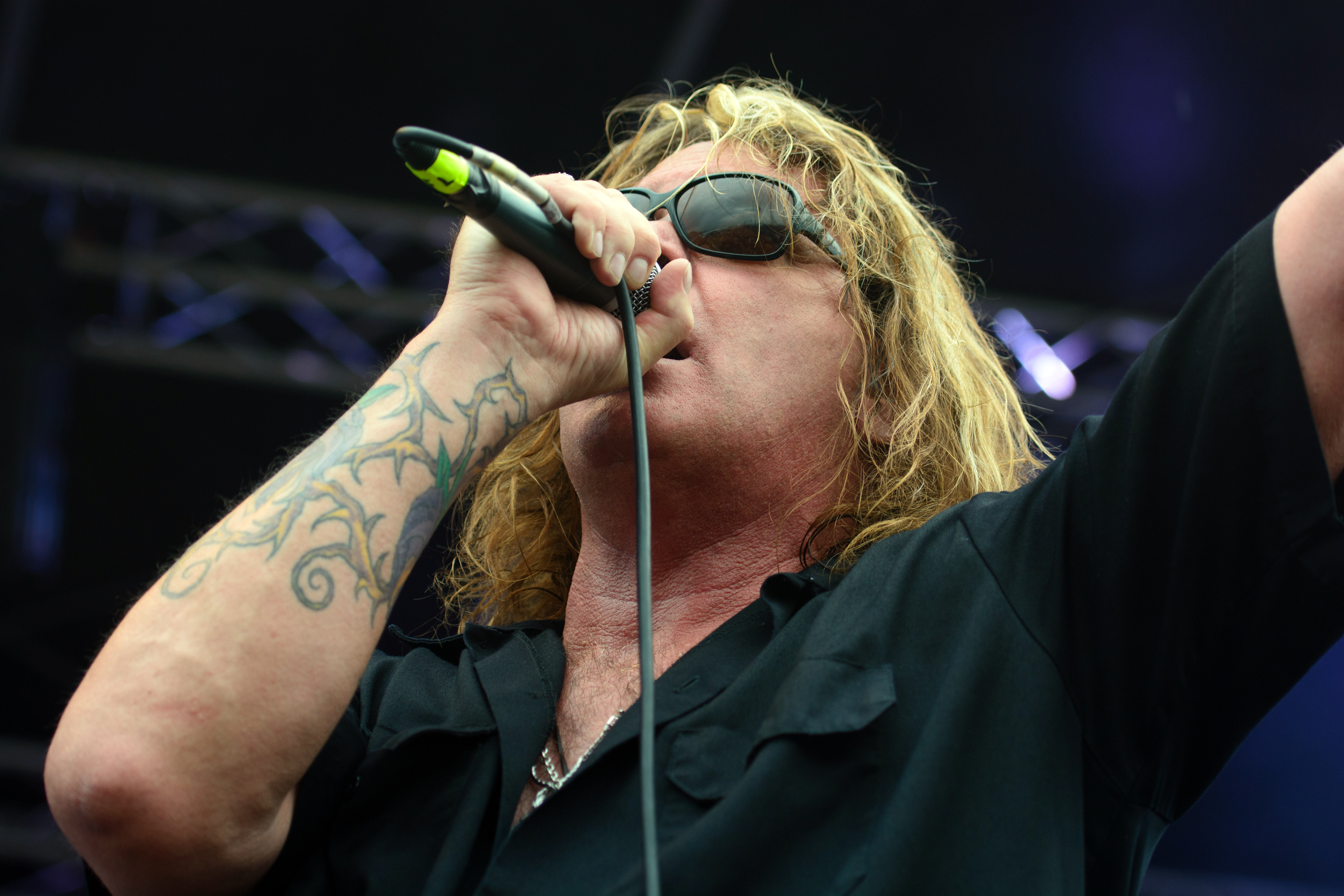
- Reece with Bonfire in 2016

Background information
- Born: David L. Reece
- Origin: United States
- Genres: Heavy metal, hard rock
- Occupation: Singer
- Years active: 1980s–present
- Formerly of: Accept

David L. Reece (born 10 August 1960) is an American singer who has been active in the heavy metal and hard rock scenes since the late 1980s, recording with several bands including Bonfire from January 2015 to July 2016. He is best known for his time with the band Accept, appearing on their 1989 album Eat the Heat.

== Career ==
=== Early years ===
Reece was raised in Oklahoma, eventually moving to Minnesota and performing with major local rockers Dare Force in the early 1980s. He also recorded vocals in 1987 for a demo for the hard rock band Sacred Child. Although he was replaced by Astrid Young before recording their album, the demos were included on a re-release of their debut.

=== With Accept ===
After many auditions, Reece was chosen to be the new Accept singer, and was the lead vocalist appearing on the 1989 album Eat the Heat. He and the rest of the band produced what has been regarded as a much different sounding album compared to the previous Accept albums, and reception was mixed. The 1989–1990 tour with W.A.S.P and Metal Church was eventually cancelled, and he was dropped from the band as Accept went on a hiatus.

=== After Accept ===
After being fired from Accept, he formed Bangalore Choir and released the album On Target with them. The band included members of Reno, Nevada's Razormaid and the slightly more well-known Hericane Alice - a band for which Reece had declined to record demo vocals earlier due to his involvement with Lillian Axe - a partnership which never resulted in any recorded material. The following years, he released two albums with Sircle of Silence with Larry Farkas from Vengeance Rising, Jay Schellen from Hurricane and Greg Chaisson, formerly of Badlands. He then released an album with American band Stream.

In 1992 joined up with New Jersey band Spare Change, performing many gigs most notably Obsessions in Randolph NJ.

In 2007, Reece joined Swedish band Gypsy Rose, releasing an album with them the following year.

Reece released his first solo album in August 2009, with Andy Susemihl (ex-U.D.O.), Stefan Schwarzmann (ex-U.D.O., ex-Accept) and Jochen Fünders (ex-Holy Moses) participating. He later released an album from a joint project with Martin Kronberg from Gypsy Rose in between releases from a reunited Bangalore Choir, and another solo album in between releases by Tango Down. He then released an album with the band EZ Livin' before joining Bonfire in 2015. On the new solo project "Resilient Heart" 2018, Reece teamed up with the musicians Marco Angioni (guitar, songwriter, producer), Martin J. Andersen (guitar, songwriter), Malte Frederik Burkert (bass) and Sigurd J. Jensen (drums). The album was recorded at Death Island Studio in Denmark with Marco Angioni as producer and is entitled 'Resilient Heart'. It was released in November 2018.

== Discography ==
Solo

- Cacophony of Souls (2020)
- I Can't Breathe (2021) single
- Blacklist Utopia (2021)
- Enemy Is Me (2024) single
- Baptized by Fire (2024)

With Accept

- Eat the Heat (1989)
- Generation Clash (1989) maxisingle, some releases include 1 non-album single edit
- Hot & Slow: Classics, Rocks 'n' Ballads (2000) compilation includes 1 unreleased single edit

With Alex De Rosso

- Alex De Rosso (1995, 2 songs)

With Bangalore Choir

- On Target (1992) remastered in 2010
- Selections from On Target (1992) promo
- Doin' the Dance (1992) single
- Loaded Gun (1992) single
- Cadence (2010)
- All or Nothing – Live at Firefest (2011) live album
- Metaphor (2012)
- All or Nothing. The complete studio albums collection (2021) compilation includes 3CD with bonus material
- Beyond the Target. Alternate mixes, rarities and demos (2022) compilations includes unreleased material
- Center Mass (2023) includes bonus CD "Live in Hamburg 2022"

With Bonedryver

- Workin' Man (2022) single
- Valley of Bones (2022, 1 song)

With Bonfire

- Glorious (2015)
- Pearls (2016)

With Christian Tolle Project

- The Higher Their Climb (2012, lead & backing vocals)
- Now & Then (2016, lead & backing vocals)
- Point Blank (2018, 5 songs)
- Now & Then "Encore" (2022)

With EZ Livin'

- Firestorm (2014)

With Goot

- It's Just Life (2019) single
- As the Earth Rotates (2020) maxisingle
- Deadly Free (2021, 2 songs + 2 remixes)
- Light It Up (2023) EP
- Devour (2023) single
- Weight of Days (2024)
- Tick-Tock (2024) maxisingle
- The Toll Remains The Same (2025)
- The Feed (2026) single
- My Time (2026)

With Gypsy Rose

- Another World (2008)

With Ion Pulse

- Rock'n'Roll Children (2022) single
- Children of Snake Mountain (2022) EP
- Heirs to the Wasteland (2022) single

With Iron Allies

- Full of Surprises (2022) single
- Blood In Blood Out (2022) single
- Blood In Blood Out (2022)

With John Steel

- John Steel: "Distorted Reality" (2021 single)
- John Steel: "Woman of Ice" (2021 single)
- John Steel: Distorted Reality (2022)

With Malice

- Fight (2013) single

With Nergard

- Memorial for a Wish (2013, 1 song)
- Memorial for a Wish. 2018 Version (2013 remixed album, 1 song)

With Reece

- Universal Language (2009)
- Compromise (2013)
- Any Time at All (2018) single
- A Perfect Apocalypse (2018) single
- Resilient Heart (2018)

With Reece/Kronlund

- Solid (2011)

With Sacred Child

- Sacred Child (1998, CD re-release of 1987 album, includes bonus demo with Reece recorded in 1987)

With Sadly Hated

- You Gotta Go (2023) single

With Sainted Sinners

- Sainted Sinners (2017)
- Back With a Vengeance (2018)

With Sickera

- The Story Begins (2023) maxisingle

With Sircle of Silence

- David Reece (1993) demo tape, as "David Reece" moniker
- Sircle of Silence (1993) demo tape
- Sircle of Silence (1993)
- Suicide Candyman (1994)
- Sircle of Silence (2007) compilation 2CD includes both albums

With Steel Project

- Burn It Down (2026) single
- Rise Again (2026) single

With Stephan Georg

- And Again Everything Is Possible (2020)
- Faith Will Never Die (2020, 1 song)
- Fightin' the Virus (2021, 4 songs)
- The Fire Still Burns (2021, 2 songs)
- The Way is the Goal (2022, 3 songs)
- Swallow the Glow (2023)

With Stian Pian

- Vampire's Empire (2023) single

With Stream

- Take it or Leave it (1995)
- Chasing the Dragon (2003) compilation with 2 unreleased tracks with Reece
- Stream (2006) compilation with 1 unreleased demo track with Reece

With Tango Down

- Identity Crisis (2012)
- Charming Devil (2014)

With The Sheriff

- Leave This Town (2022) single
- Every Moment Counts (2022) single

With Tight

- Give Me Trust (2023) single
- Give Me Trust (2024, 1 song) EP

With Voices of Rock

- Voices of Rock II: High & Mighty (2009, 1 song)

With Wicked Sensation

- Adrenaline Rush (2014)
- Outbreak (2021)

With Zhenx

- Zhenx (2017, 1 song)

With Графит

- Wise Man of Truth (2023) single
