= Humanoid (Accept album) =

Studio album by Accept
- Released: 26 April 2024
- Recorded: 2023–2024
- Studios: Backstage Recording Studios Ltd., Derbyshire, England
- Length: 48:13
- Label: Napalm
- Producer: Andy Sneap

Accept chronology
Too Mean to Die (2021)	Humanoid (2024)

Singles from Humanoid
- 1. "Humanoid" Released: 28 February 2024; 2. "The Reckoning" Released: 27 March 2024; 3. "Frankenstein" Released: 24 April 2024

Humanoid is the seventeenth studio album by German heavy metal band Accept, released on 26 April 2024. It is the band's first studio album on Napalm Records, with whom Accept had signed with in February 2022. It is also the band's last album with guitarist Uwe Lulis before his departure from the band in September 2025.

== Reception ==
Professional ratings
Review scores
Source	Rating
Blabbermouth.net	7.5/10

Humanoid has received positive reviews from critics. Dom Lawson of Blabbermouth.net gave the album a rating of seven-and-a-half out of ten, writing, "For those who enjoyed the previous five, there is absolutely nothing here that fails to live up to expectations. Accept are, and have always been, exceptionally good at heavy metal. It's their thing", and added that the album "can be devoured as another generous serving of fresh metal anthems." Lawson also referred to "Unbreakable" and "Mind Games" as "among the finest songs that the band have written since 2009", and "Straight Up Jack" as "so unapologetic about its debt to AC/DC that resistance is useless."

== Track listing ==
All tracks are written by Wolf Hoffmann and Mark Tornillo, except where noted.

Original Edition
No.	Title	Writer(s)	Length
1.	"Diving into Sin"	Hoffmann, Martin Motnik, Tornillo	4:01
2.	"Humanoid"		4:36
3.	"Frankenstein"	Uwe Lulis, Hoffman, Tornillo	4:15
4.	"Man Up"		5:09
5.	"The Reckoning"	Hoffmann, Motnik	4:35
6.	"Nobody Gets Out Alive"		4:07
7.	"Ravages of Time"	Hoffmann, Motnik	4:16
8.	"Unbreakable"	Hoffmann, Motnik, Tornillo	4:54
9.	"Mind Games"		4:06
10.	"Straight Up Jack"		3:28
11.	"Southside of Hell"		4:57
Total length:			48:19

Bonus Track
No.	Title	Length
9.	"Hard Times (Curtis Mayfield cover)"	3:40

== Personnel ==
Accept

- Mark Tornillo – vocals
- Wolf Hoffmann – guitar
- Uwe Lulis – guitar
- Martin Motnik – bass
- Christopher Williams – drums

Additional contributors

- Andy Sneap – production, mixing
- Phil Shouse – additional guitars
- Clay Vann – additional backing vocals
- Matt Smith – additional backing vocals
- Gyula Havancsák – artwork, layout
- Grzegorz Gołębiowski – photos

== Charts ==
Chart performance for Humanoid
Chart (2024)	Peak position
Austrian Albums (Ö3 Austria)	2
Belgian Albums (Ultratop Flanders)	58
Belgian Albums (Ultratop Wallonia)	121
Finnish Albums (Suomen virallinen lista)	19
German Albums (Offizielle Top 100)	5
Hungarian Physical Albums (MAHASZ)	39
Japanese Albums (Oricon)	45
Japanese Hot Albums (Billboard Japan)	57
Polish Albums (ZPAV)	4
Scottish Albums (Official Charts)	45
Swedish Albums (Sverigetopplistan)	22
Swiss Albums (Schweizer Hitparade)	6
UK Album Downloads (Official Charts)	41
UK Independent Albums (Official Charts)	13
UK Rock & Metal Albums (Official Charts)	7
