= Too Mean to Die =

Studio album by Accept
- Released: 29 January 2021
- Recorded: 2020
- Genre: Heavy metal
- Length: 52:11
- Label: Nuclear Blast
- Producer: Andy Sneap

Accept chronology
The Rise of Chaos (2017)	Too Mean to Die (2021)	Humanoid (2024)

Singles from Too Mean to Die
- 1. "The Undertaker" Released: 2 October 2020; 2. "Too Mean to Die" Released: 6 November 2020; 3. "Zombie Apocalypse" Released: 15 January 2021

Professional ratings
Review scores
Source	Rating
Metal Hammer	4/5 stars
Metal Hammer Italia	85/100

Too Mean to Die is the sixteenth studio album by German heavy metal band Accept, released on 29 January 2021. It is the first Accept album to feature Martin Motnik, who replaced original bassist Peter Baltes in 2019, and the first album to feature rhythm guitarist Philip Shouse, who joined the band that same year in 2019; as such, Too Mean to Die would be their only album to be recorded as a six-piece band as opposed to a five-piece. While Shouse has remained a member of the band, he did not play on their next album, Humanoid Accept signed with Napalm Records in February 2022, making Too Mean to Die their last album to be released on Nuclear Blast.

== Background ==
The album was released approximately three years after The Rise of Chaos, which came out in 2017. Work on the album began in late 2018, when the band started developing musical ideas, and full recording sessions commenced in March 2020.

The album was recorded in Nashville, Tennessee, United States, with British music producer Andy Sneap handling production and mixing. The recording process was initially planned to take place in two sessions. The band recorded seven tracks in early 2020, intending to work on the remaining songs later. However, travel restrictions imposed during the COVID-19 pandemic prevented Sneap from travelling to the United States. As a result, the latter part of the recording process involved exchanging feedback online and using remote production methods.

The album title, Too Mean to Die, reflects the band's determination not to give in despite the uncertainty caused by the COVID-19 pandemic. Guitarist Wolf Hoffmann explained that the title was intended as a light-hearted and humorous response to the circumstances at the time. The band sought to deliver the direct and powerful style of heavy metal for which Accept is known.

The album also marked the first Accept studio album to feature bassist Martin Motnik and guitarist Philip Shouse. Motnik joined the band as the replacement for founding member Peter Baltes, who departed in 2018, while Shouse joined in 2019 as a third guitarist. The album was therefore recorded by a six-member lineup consisting of vocalist Mark Tornillo, guitarists Hoffmann, Uwe Lulis and Shouse, bassist Motnik, and drummer Christopher Williams.

The album was initially scheduled for release on 15 January 2021, but the date was postponed to 29 January due to production delays caused by the closure of record manufacturing facilities amid the COVID-19 pandemic. Too Mean to Die was released on 29 January 2021, through Nuclear Blast.

== Track listing ==
Original Edition
No.	Title	Writer(s)	Length
1.	"Zombie Apocalypse"	Wolf Hoffmann, Mark Tornillo	5:35
2.	"Too Mean to Die"	Hoffmann, Tornillo, Deaffy	4:21
3.	"Overnight Sensation"	Hoffmann, Tornillo, Deaffy	4:24
4.	"No Ones Master"	Martin Motnik, Hoffmann, Tornillo	4:10
5.	"The Undertaker"	Hoffman, Tornillo	5:37
6.	"Sucks to Be You"	Motnik, Hoffman, Tornillo	4:05
7.	"Symphony of Pain"	Hoffmann, Tornillo, Deaffy	4:39
8.	"The Best Is Yet to Come"	Hoffmann, Tornillo, Motnik, Deaffy	4:47
9.	"How Do We Sleep"	Hoffmann, Tornillo, Motnik, Deaffy	5:41
10.	"Not My Problem"	Hoffmann, Motnik, Tornillo, Deaffy	4:21
11.	"Samson and Delilah"	Camille Saint-Saëns, arr. by Hoffmann	4:31
Total length:			52:11

== Personnel ==
Accept

- Mark Tornillo – vocals
- Wolf Hoffmann – guitar
- Uwe Lulis – guitar
- Philip Shouse – guitar
- Martin Motnik – bass
- Christopher Williams – drums

Additional performer

- Clay Vann – additional backing vocals

Production

- Andy Sneap – production, mixing
- Gyula Havancsák – artwork, layout
- Tim Wezel – artwork, layout

== Charts ==
Chart performance for Too Mean to Die
Chart (2021)	Peak position
Austrian Albums (Ö3 Austria)	9
Belgian Albums (Ultratop Flanders)	92
Belgian Albums (Ultratop Wallonia)	39
Czech Albums (ČNS IFPI)	38
Finnish Albums (Suomen virallinen lista)	4
French Albums (SNEP)	88
German Albums (Offizielle Top 100)	2
Hungarian Albums (MAHASZ)	11
Polish Albums (ZPAV)	10
Scottish Albums (Official Charts)	14
Spanish Albums (Promusicae)	33
Swedish Albums (Sverigetopplistan)	7
Swiss Albums (Schweizer Hitparade)	4
UK Independent Albums (Official Charts)	7
UK Rock & Metal Albums (Official Charts)	3
