= Balls to the Wall (song) =

Single by Accept

from the album Balls to the Wall
- B-side: "Losing More Than You've Ever Had"
- Released: April 1984
- Recorded: 1983
- Studio: Dierks Studios, Cologne, Germany
- Genre: Heavy metal, hard rock
- Length: 5:44 (album version); 4:28 (video edit)
- Label: RCA (Germany); Portrait (U.S.A.)
- Songwriters: Udo Dirkschneider; Wolf Hoffmann; Herman Frank; Peter Baltes; Stefan Kaufmann; Deaffy
- Producer: Accept

Accept singles chronology
| "Love Child" (1984) | "Balls to the Wall" (1984) | "Metal Heart" (1985) |

Music video
- "Balls to the Wall" on YouTube

"Balls to the Wall" is a song by German heavy metal band Accept. It was released as the lead single from their 1983 studio album of the same name. The anthemic title track is the album's best known song, and quickly became Accept's signature song. An accompanying music video was made that received airplay on MTV.

As of 5 September 2026, the music video has received over 54 million views on YouTube.

== Song meaning ==
When asked about the song meaning, lead guitarist Wolf Hoffmann said:

"We've always been interested in politics and in human rights and things like that, so a lot of the lyrics that we had in those days, and to the end actually, were dealing with human rights, for instance, and that's really what 'Balls To The Wall' is all about. 'One day the tortured will stand up and kick some ass!'"

== Music video ==
Filmed in January 1984 in London, the song's music video consists of clips of the band performing the song onstage intercut with scenes of a wrecking ball taking down a clock tower and scenes with fans of the band headbanging against the wall of the tower. Later during the buildup to the final chorus, the fans march through the rubble of the tower, and presumably head towards the stage where the band is performing. At the end of the video, singer Udo Dirkschneider rides the wrecking ball into the tower and takes out the front doors of the building it stands upon. When he discussed the scene with songfacts.com, Dirkschneider explained he was apprehensive about riding the ball because of the cold, wintry conditions on the day of the shoot, but decided to do it in the end. "It was very cold in London, near the airport", Dirkschneider said, "And especially when I had to step on this wrecking ball. I said, 'Please, no, I don't want to do this!' But in the end, I was young so I said, 'Okay, here we go.' But it was freezing like hell". The song was also edited down for the video, with the guitar solo and Dirkschneider's spoken bridge being removed. The video edit of the song clocks in at four minutes and twenty eight seconds long, while the album version is five minutes and forty four seconds long.

== Track listing ==
| No. | Title | Length |
|---|---|---|
| 1. | "Balls to the Wall" | 5:44 |
| 2. | "Losing More Than You've Ever Had" | 5:04 |

== Personnel ==
=== Accept ===
- Udo Dirkschneider – vocals
- Wolf Hoffmann – lead guitar
- Herman Frank – rhythm guitar
- Peter Baltes – bass
- Stefan Kaufmann – drums

== Puscifer cover version ==
Puscifer released a cover version of the song as well as a remix of the cover version on their EP Donkey Punch the Night.
