= Blind Rage (album) =

Studio album by Accept
- Released: 15 August 2014
- Genre: Heavy metal
- Length: 58:34
- Label: Nuclear Blast
- Producer: Andy Sneap

Accept chronology
Stalingrad (2012)	Blind Rage (2014)	Restless and Live (2017)

Singles from Blind Rage
- 1. "Stampede" Released: 11 July 2014

Blind Rage is the 14th studio album by German heavy metal band Accept. It was released on 15 August 2014 on Nuclear Blast Records. The album debuted at number one on the German albums chart. This is Accept's last album with guitarist Herman Frank and drummer Stefan Schwarzmann, who both left the band in December 2014.

== Background ==
The album's title and cover artwork were revealed in early April 2014. At the same time, it was announced that the album was due to be released on 18 July 2014. However, this would later be pushed back to 15 August 2014.

The band announced a touring schedule to promote the album. Four US dates were performed in mid-September 2014. Following that, the band will tour Europe in September and October 2014. Several Australian shows are also scheduled for November 2014.

The album's lead single, "Stampede" was released on 11 July 2014. A video, directed by Greg Aronowitz, was also made for the song. It features the band performing at the Devil's Punchbowl in the California desert. On 13 August 2014, a lyric video was released for "Final Journey".

A guitar solo of Final Journey uses the theme of Morning Mood from Edvard Grieg (Peer Gynt, 1876).

== Reception ==
Professional ratings
Review scores
Source	Rating
AllMusic	3.5/5 stars
Blabbermouth.net	8.5/10
Brave Words and Bloody Knuckles	(9/10)
Metalholic	8.5/10 stars
All About The Rock	8/10 stars

Gregory Heaney of AllMusic commented that the album was like a guard dog on a short leash; "restrained, but still dangerous, as if at any moment things could break bad and spin out of control."

Ray Van Horn Jr. of Blabbermouth.net gave a favorable review of the album. He cited it as proof that Accept are still "masters of their trade, no matter who holds the mike." Van Horn also opined that a couple songs on the album reference moments from earlier in the band's career, notably Balls to the Wall and Metal Heart.

Mark Gromen of Brave Words and Bloody Knuckles reacted positively to the album. Gromen noted that the album compares more closely to Blood of the Nations than it does to Stalingrad.

George Nisbet of All About The Rock said "Overall, it’s a solid, dynamic and incredibly vital album… the metal heart of Accept beats stronger with each new release"

Blind Rage debuted at number one on the German charts, making it the band's first number one debut in their career. The album also debuted at number one in Finland, and peaked at #35 on the Billboard 200, making it Accept's highest chart position in the United States.

The album won a 2014 Metal Storm Award for Best Heavy Metal/Melodic Album.

== Track listing ==
All tracks are written by Peter Baltes, Wolf Hoffmann, and Mark Tornillo.

Original Edition
No.	Title	Length
1.	"Stampede"	5:15
2.	"Dying Breed"	5:22
3.	"Dark Side of My Heart"	4:38
4.	"Fall of the Empire"	5:46
5.	"Trail of Tears"	4:09
6.	"Wanna Be Free"	5:38
7.	"200 Years"	4:31
8.	"Bloodbath Mastermind"	6:00
9.	"From the Ashes We Rise"	5:54
10.	"The Curse"	6:29
11.	"Final Journey"	5:03
Total length:		58:39

Bonus Track
No.	Title	Length
12.	"Thrown to the Wolves"	3:52
Total length:		62:30

== Personnel ==
All credits adapted from liner notes.

Accept

- Mark Tornillo – vocals
- Wolf Hoffmann – guitar
- Herman Frank – guitar
- Peter Baltes – bass
- Stefan Schwarzmann – drums

Production

- Produced, engineered, mixed and mastered by Andy Sneap
- Artwork and layout by Dan Goldsworthy

== Charts ==
Chart (2014)	Peak position
Austrian Albums (Ö3 Austria)	18
Belgian Albums (Ultratop Flanders)	48
Belgian Albums (Ultratop Wallonia)	46
Danish Albums (Hitlisten)	11
Finnish Albums (Suomen virallinen lista)	1
French Albums (SNEP)	48
German Albums (Offizielle Top 100)	1
Hungarian Albums (MAHASZ)	2
Norwegian Albums (VG-lista)	19
Scottish Albums (Official Charts)	65
Spanish Albums (Promusicae)	39
Swedish Albums (Sverigetopplistan)	16
Swiss Albums (Schweizer Hitparade)	9
UK Albums (Official Charts)	85
UK Independent Albums (Official Charts)	15
UK Rock & Metal Albums (Official Charts)	9
US Billboard 200	35
