= Metal Heart =

Studio album by Accept
- Released: March 4, 1985
- Recorded: October–December 1984
- Studios: Dierks Studios, Stommeln, West Germany
- Genre: Heavy metal
- Length: 39:53
- Labels: RCA (Europe); Portrait/Epic (US)
- Producer: Dieter Dierks

Accept chronology
Balls to the Wall (1983)	Metal Heart (1985)	Kaizoku-Ban (1985)

Singles from Metal Heart
- 1. "Midnight Mover" Released: March 1985; 2. "Metal Heart" Released: 1985 (Japan); 3. "Screaming for a Love-Bite" Released: 1985 (EU)

Professional ratings
Review scores
Source	Rating
AllMusic	4.5/5 stars
Collector's Guide to Heavy Metal	9/10

Metal Heart is the sixth studio album by German heavy metal band Accept, released in 1985. Although the group had recorded before at Dierks-Studios, this was the first album produced by Dieter Dierks himself. It marked the return of guitarist Jörg Fischer after a two-year absence, with Herman Frank having been his replacement. This album was a cautious attempt to crack the lucrative American market with more accessible songcraft and emphasis on hooks and melodies. Although critically panned at the time, today Metal Heart is often considered by fans as one of the band's best records. It contains several of their classic songs such as "Metal Heart" and "Living for Tonite". The band also makes a detour into jazz metal territory with the unusual song "Teach Us to Survive".

== Album information ==
Wolf Hoffmann explained the concept behind the album: "We had read an article that someone was working on an artificial heart and that one day everybody is going to have a computerized heart. It talked, in general terms, about how more and more of humanity gets sucked out of daily life and more and more replaced by machines. It's not a new thing now, but then it was new. Humans versus machine was the general vibe of the record." The original cover concept was for a hologram of a metal heart until budget considerations resulted in a traditional cover. But fittingly for the futuristic theme of the album, Metal Heart was the first Accept album to be digitally mastered.

Hoffmann recalls Dieter Dierks as a very demanding producer: "We would do some pieces several dozen times trying to capture what he had in his mind for a specific section," adding: "Each song we tried different combinations of guitars, mic'ing and even strings!"

The song "Metal Heart" is well known for containing the cover of two famous classical themes: Tchaikovsky's "Slavonic March" (in the intro) and Beethoven's "Für Elise" in the main riff and solo. This song was covered in 1998 by Norwegian black metal band Dimmu Borgir for their album Godless Savage Garden. "I had no idea it would become as popular as it did," Hoffmann remembers of his contribution to the song.

"Midnight Mover", about a drug dealer, is one of the more commercial songs on the album and was selected for a music video that anticipates the bullet time filming technique by a full decade. "Just ahead of our time again!" jests Hoffmann.

Despite the more commercially appealing sound of the album, it fell short of the sales figures of its predecessor Balls to the Wall in America. Udo remembers the Breaker through Metal Heart era as the time when the band got along best together. Thus this would turn out to be the last album of Accept's golden era, as cracks were soon to appear in the band's solidarity.

The 2002 digitally remastered CD edition includes two live bonus tracks, "Love Child" and "Living for Tonite", both taken from the live EP Kaizoku-Ban. The 2013 release from UK-based record label Hear No Evil Recordings contains the live EP itself.

== Reception ==
Spin wrote, "Poised to become this year's Scorpions, the band (like so many other freeze-dried HM acts) looks more like Spinal Tap. Metal Heart reeks of studied moves. The squalling guitars and lockstep beat on Metal Heart are characteristic Eurometal trademarks. Accept is just another commodity."

== Track listing ==
All lyrics and music were written by Accept and Deaffy.

Side one
No.	Title	Length
1.	"Metal Heart"	5:25
2.	"Midnight Mover"	3:07
3.	"Up to the Limit"	3:45
4.	"Wrong Is Right"	3:08
5.	"Screaming for a Love-Bite"	4:05

Side two
No.	Title	Length
6.	"Too High to Get It Right"	3:47
7.	"Dogs on Leads"	4:24
8.	"Teach Us to Survive"	3:33
9.	"Living for Tonite"	3:34
10.	"Bound to Fail"	5:05
Total length:		39:53

2002 bonus tracks
No.	Title	Length
1.	"Love Child" (Live, Taken from Kaizoku-Ban)	4:49
2.	"Living for Tonite" (Live, Taken from Kaizoku-Ban)	3:50
Total length:		49:32

== Credits ==
Band members

- Udo Dirkschneider – lead vocals, harmony vocals (4, 9, 10), backing vocals (1, 8), finger snapping (8)
- Wolf Hoffmann – lead & rhythm guitars (all except 9), rhythm guitar (9), acoustic guitar (1, 10), backing vocals (1, 6, 7, 10), electric sitar (1)
- Jörg Fischer – rhythm guitar (all except 4, 9), lead & rhythm guitars (4, 9), 8-string bass (3), backing vocals (1, 6, 7, 10), finger snapping (8)
- Peter Baltes – bass, Moog Taurus (1, 5, 7, 10), 8-string bass (1, 8, 10), backing vocals (1, 6, 7, 10), harmony vocals (2, 5), acoustic bass guitar (8)
- Stefan Kaufmann – drums, backing vocals (1, 6, 7, 10), timpani (1, 8, 10), cymbals and gongs (1), drum effects and gang vocals (3)

Production

- Dieter Dierks – producer, arrangements
- Gerd Rautenbach – engineer
- Mike Kashnitz, Peter Brandt – assistant engineers
- Bob Ludwig – mastering at Masterdisk, New York
- Gaby "Deaffy" Hauke – management, cover concept
- Dirksen & Sohn Modellwerkstâtten, Stahl, Werbefotografie – cover art

== Charts ==
Chart (1985)	Peak position
Canada Top Albums/CDs (RPM)	86
Finnish Albums (The Official Finnish Charts)	8
German Albums (Offizielle Top 100)	13
Japanese Albums (Oricon)	47
Norwegian Albums (VG-lista)	9
Swedish Albums (Sverigetopplistan)	4
Swiss Albums (Schweizer Hitparade)	14
UK Albums (Official Charts)	50
US Billboard 200	94
