= Predator (album) =

Studio album by Accept
- Released: 15 January 1996
- Studio: 16th Ave. Sound Studios, Nashville, Tennessee, US, 1995
- Genre: Heavy metal
- Length: 48:05
- Label: RCA/BMG Ariola
- Producer: Michael Wagener

Accept chronology
Death Row (1994)	Predator (1996)	All Areas – Worldwide (1997)

Singles from Predator
- 1. "Hard Attack" Released: September 1996

Professional ratings
Review scores
Source	Rating
AllMusic	2/5 stars
Collector's Guide to Heavy Metal	8/10
Hard Force (FRA)	3/5 stars
Hard n' Heavy (FRA)	3/5 stars

Predator is the eleventh studio album by German heavy metal band Accept, released in 1996. It was produced by Michael Wagener and recorded at 16th Ave. Sound Studios, Nashville, Tennessee. Predator was Accept's last album before their hiatus from 1997, their last recording with singer Udo Dirkschneider and their only recording with drummer Michael Cartellone from Damn Yankees and Lynyrd Skynyrd.

== Track listing ==
No.	Title	Writer(s)	Length
1.	"Hard Attack"	Wolf Hoffmann, Peter Baltes, Udo Dirkschneider	4:37
2.	"Crossroads"	Baltes, Hoffmann, Dirkschneider, Deaffy	5:12
3.	"Making Me Scream"	Hoffmann, Baltes, Dirkschneider, Deaffy	4:13
4.	"Diggin' in the Dirt"	Hoffmann, Baltes, Dirkschneider, Deaffy	4:01
5.	"Lay It Down"	Hoffmann, Baltes, Deaffy	5:01
6.	"It Ain't Over Yet"	Hoffmann, Baltes	4:15
7.	"Predator"	Hoffmann, Dirkschneider, Deaffy	3:38
8.	"Crucified"	Hoffmann, Baltes, Dirkschneider, Deaffy	3:01
9.	"Take Out the Crime"	Stefan Kaufmann, Dirkschneider, Deaffy	3:12
10.	"Don't Give a Damn"	Hoffmann, Baltes, Dirkschneider, Deaffy	2:58
11.	"Run Through the Night"	Kaufmann, Dirkschneider, Deaffy	3:21
12.	"Primitive"	Hoffmann, Baltes	4:36
Total length:			48:05

Japanese bonus track
No.	Title	Length
1.	"This One's for You (Live)"	4:13
Total length:		52:18

== Credits ==
Band members

- Udo Dirkschneider – vocals
- Wolf Hoffmann – guitars, cover art
- Peter Baltes – bass, lead vocals on "Lay It Down", "It Ain't Over Yet" and "Primitive", co-lead vocals on "Crossroads"

Additional musicians

- Michael Cartellone – drums on all tracks, except "Primitive"
- Kalei Lam – additional percussion on "Predator"

Production

- Michael Wagener – producer, engineer, mixing
- Jeff Gudenrath, Doug Trantow – assistant engineers
- Stephen Marcussen – mastering at Precision Mastering, Los Angeles
- Bill Barnes – art direction
- Swatson, Barnes & Co. – cover design

== Charts ==
Chart (1996)	Peak position
Finnish Albums (Suomen virallinen lista)	27
German Albums (Offizielle Top 100)	56
Japanese Albums (Oricon)	56
Swedish Albums (Sverigetopplistan)	28
Swiss Albums (Schweizer Hitparade)	49
