= Gaby Hoffmann (songwriter) =

German songwriter and manager

Gaby Hoffmann (née Hauke) is primarily known as songwriter under the pseudonym Deaffy and former manager for the heavy metal band Accept. She has also contributed cover art concepts, marketing ideas for the band and even stage moves and wardrobe. She was married to the band's guitarist Wolf Hoffmann. She retired from the manager position in 2019.

== Work for Accept ==
Accept hired Gaby Hauke as their manager in 1981 after releasing Breaker. She secured a spot supporting Judas Priest on their World Wide Blitz Tour the same year, and is credited for songwriting for the first time on Accept's next album Restless and Wild (1982). She is credited as lyricist on all songs on their albums from Balls to the Wall (1983) to Death Row (1994), with the exception of two instrumentals on Death Row. She's credited on several songs on Predator (1996). Since 2010, Accept's new vocalist Mark Tornillo has been credited for their lyrics, although Tornillo has acknowledged her ongoing influence when discussing the title track from Stalingrad (2012) and their 2014 album Blind Rage.

Hoffmann is credited for the cover art concept for Balls to the Wall, Metal Heart and Russian Roulette, as well as their 2014 album Blind Rage.

In 2019, Accept announced that Gaby Hoffmann is officially retiring. Deaffy is still mentioned among songwriters on Accept's 2021 album Too Mean to Die.

== Work for others ==
=== U.D.O. ===
Hoffmann is credited for the cover art concept for U.D.O.'s 1988 album Mean Machine as well as songwriting on their 1987 album Animal House and their 1991 album Timebomb under the Deaffy pseudonym.

=== Dokken ===
Hoffmann assisted Don Dokken in his pursuit of a record deal after recording demos with Michael Wagener in Germany in 1981, which eventually led to Dokken's debut Breaking the Chains.

=== Mad Max and Casanova ===
Hoffmann wrote the lyrics for the song "All of My Heart" on German heavy metal band Mad Max' 2008 album Here We Are.

Together with her husband Wolf, Hoffmann also wrote the song "One of These Days" on the album One Night Stand (1992) by Casanova, a band formed by former Warlock members along with vocalist Michael Voss from Mad Max.
