= Objection Overruled =

Studio album by Accept
- Released: 1 February 1993
- Recorded: 1992
- Studio: Dierks Studios, Stommeln, Cologne, Germany
- Genre: Heavy metal
- Length: 47:52
- Label: RCA/BMG Ariola (Europe); CMC International (US); Victor (Japan)
- Producer: Accept

Accept chronology
Staying a Life (1990)	Objection Overruled (1993)	Death Row (1994)

Singles from Objection Overruled
- 1. "I Don't Wanna Be Like You" Released: January 1993; 2. "All or Nothing" Released: March 1993

Professional ratings
Review scores
Source	Rating
AllMusic	3/5 stars
Collector's Guide to Heavy Metal	7/10

Objection Overruled is the ninth studio album by German heavy metal band Accept, released in 1993. It is the first to feature Udo Dirkschneider on lead vocals since 1986's Russian Roulette. It was recorded at Dierks-Studios in Stommeln after pre-production at Roxx Studios.

== Background ==
In contrast to some of the other Accept albums, Wolf Hoffmann recalls Objection Overruled as an easy one to record: "That was great! I mean, making up and having reunions are always great in a way because you feel that sort of spirit or fresh wind again. It was great! We had a ball back then," adding, "we just really pretty much made records like we always did and felt like we should use the old formulas with no more sort of experiments and just pretty much do what Accept is known for; and that's what we did."

Udo concurs, calling Objection Overruled "that classic Accept sound again" as well as "a very good Accept album". It was only after the album's release that rifts would begin to re-emerge within the band.

The uncredited cover photo was taken by Wolf Hoffmann.

Until 2017 "Bulletproof" and "Amamos la Vida" was the only song from the album that is still played in live shows. In their 2017-2018 tour, they also included the title song back to their setlist.

== Track listing ==
All lyrics and music written by Accept and Deaffy

No.	Title	Length
1.	"Objection Overruled"	3:39
2.	"I Don't Wanna Be Like You"	4:18
3.	"Protectors of Terror"	4:03
4.	"Slaves to Metal"	4:37
5.	"All or Nothing"	4:31
6.	"Bulletproof"	5:05
7.	"Amamos la Vida"	4:39
8.	"Sick, Dirty and Mean"	4:33
9.	"Donation"	4:48
10.	"Just by My Own" (Instrumental)	3:29
11.	"This One's for You"	4:10
Total length:		47:52

Japanese bonus track
No.	Title	Length
1.	"Rich & Famous"	3:10
Total length:		51:05

== Credits ==
Band members

- Udo Dirkschneider – vocals
- Wolf Hoffmann – guitars, cover photo
- Peter Baltes – bass guitar
- Stefan Kaufmann – drums

Additional musicians

- Frank Knight – additional vocals

Production

- Pre-production at Roxx Studios
- Produced, recorded and mixed by Accept at Dierks Studios Gmbh, Stommeln
- Uli Baronowsky – engineer
- Steffan Böhle Kunstfrei, Hamburg – cover design
- Breeze Music Gmbh – publisher

== Charts ==
Chart (1993)	Peak position
Finnish Albums (The Official Finnish Charts)	8
German Albums (Offizielle Top 100)	17
Japanese Albums (Oricon)	22
Swedish Albums (Sverigetopplistan)	21
Swiss Albums (Schweizer Hitparade)	22
