= Death Row (album) =

Studio album by Accept
- Released: 1 October 1994
- Studios: Roxx Studios, Pulheim, Germany
- Genre: Heavy metal
- Length: 71:14
- Labels: RCA/BMG Ariola (Europe); Pavement (US); Victor (Japan)
- Producer: Accept

Accept chronology
Objection Overruled (1993)	Death Row (1994)	Predator (1996)

Singles from Death Row
- 1. "Bad Habits Die Hard" Released: December 1994

Professional ratings
Review scores
Source	Rating
AllMusic	1.5/5 stars
Collector's Guide to Heavy Metal	8/10

Death Row is the tenth studio album by German heavy metal band Accept, released in 1994. It was recorded at Roxx Studios in Pulheim, Germany.

Stefan Kaufmann was still the official drummer for Accept, but drums on "Bad Habits Die Hard" and "Prejudice" are by Stefan Schwarzmann according to the liner notes. Stefan Kaufmann had to leave the band for the subsequent tour because of health problems, and Stefan Schwarzmann then handled drum duties.

== Background ==
The album was the first recorded at Roxx Studios, with drummer Stefan Kaufmann serving as sound engineer. On Death Row, Stefan Schwarzmann played the drums for two songs and replaced Kaufmann on the next tour because of a back injury which forced him to leave the band. On the album, the band tried to take a tougher course than the previous one and combined the traditional styles with some – at this time modern – bonds from the extreme metal.

== Track listing ==
All lyrics and music written by Accept and Deaffy, except where noted.

No.	Title	Length
1.	"Death Row"	5:17
2.	"Sodom & Gomorra"	6:28
3.	"The Beast Inside"	5:57
4.	"Dead On!"	4:52
5.	"Guns 'R' Us"	4:41
6.	"Like a Loaded Gun"	4:19
7.	"What Else"	4:39
8.	"Stone Evil"	5:23
9.	"Bad Habits Die Hard"	4:41
10.	"Prejudice"	4:14
11.	"Bad Religion"	4:26
12.	"Generation Clash II"	5:05
13.	"Writing on the Wall"	4:25
14.	"Drifting Apart (Instrumental)"	3:03
15.	"Pomp and Circumstance (Instrumental)"	3:44
Total length:		1:11:14

Notes

- "Drifting Apart" is listed as "Drifting Away" on some editions
- "Sodom & Gomorra" includes the song "Sabre Dance" by Armenian composer Aram Khachaturian, running in at 1:24 minutes
- "Pomp and Circumstance" is based on "March No. 1 in D" of the Pomp and Circumstance Marches by English composer Edward Elgar

== Credits ==
Band members

- Udo Dirkschneider – vocals
- Wolf Hoffmann – guitars
- Peter Baltes – bass
- Stefan Kaufmann – drums, engineer, mixing

Additional musicians

- Stefan Schwarzmann – drums on "Bad Habits Die Hard" and "Prejudice"

Production

- Mathias Bothor – photo
- Stefan Böhle Kunsterei, Hamburg – cover design
- Published by Breeze Music Gmbh

== Charts ==
Chart (1994)	Peak position
Finnish Albums (The Official Finnish Charts)	22
German Albums (Offizielle Top 100)	32
Japanese Albums (Oricon)	52
Swedish Albums (Sverigetopplistan)	27
