= Herman Frank =

German guitarist

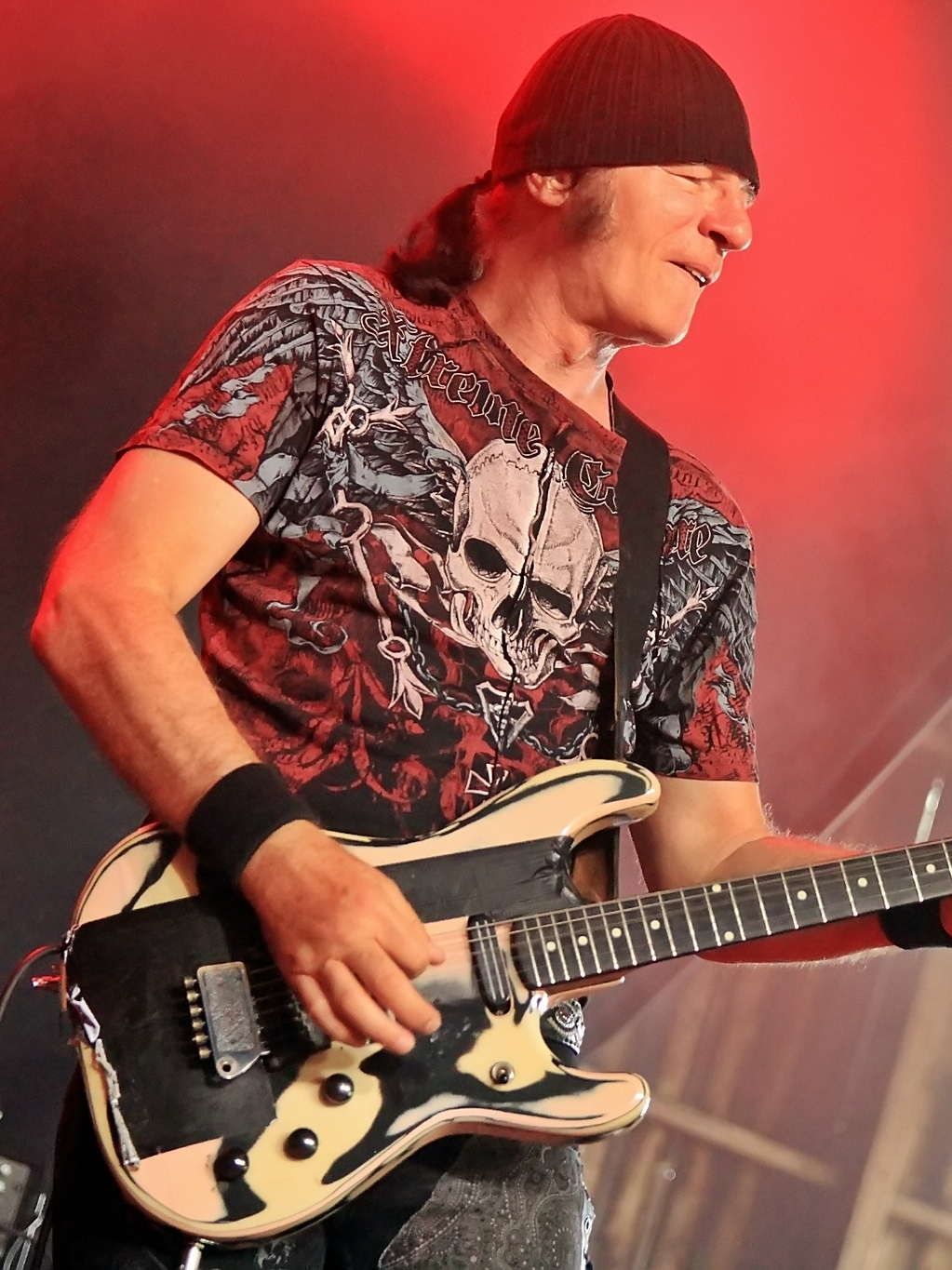
- Frank performing with Victory in 2023

Background information
- Born: 20 January 1959 (age 66)
- Origin: Hanover, West Germany
- Genres: Hard rock, heavy metal
- Occupations: Musician, record producer
- Instrument: Guitar
- Years active: 1982–present
- Website: hermanfrank.com

Herman Frank (born 20 January 1959) is a German heavy metal guitarist known for his work with Accept, Victory and Hazzard. In 2009, he released his first solo album called Loyal to None. Frank has also recorded with Sinner, Moon'Doc, Saeko, Thomsen and Poison Sun. As a record producer and engineer, he has worked for Saxon, Rose Tattoo, Crown of Creation, Molly Hatchet, Gutworm, and several others.

== Musical career ==
=== With Accept ===
Herman Frank joined Accept in 1982 shortly before the release of their album Restless and Wild. He replaced guitarist Jan Koemmet, who had been hired for Jörg Fischer but had left the band before the recording sessions. Frank himself departed after the release of the following (and the band's most successful) album, Balls to the Wall, in 1983.

When Accept reunited for festival appearances in 2005, it was with Herman Frank in the spot alongside constant presence Wolf Hoffmann. He was involved in the band's recent reunion and appeared on their 2010 album, Blood of the Nations, their first album in 14 years, and its follow-ups Stalingrad (2012) and Blind Rage (2014). On 28 December 2014, Frank announced that he had left Accept again.

== Discography ==
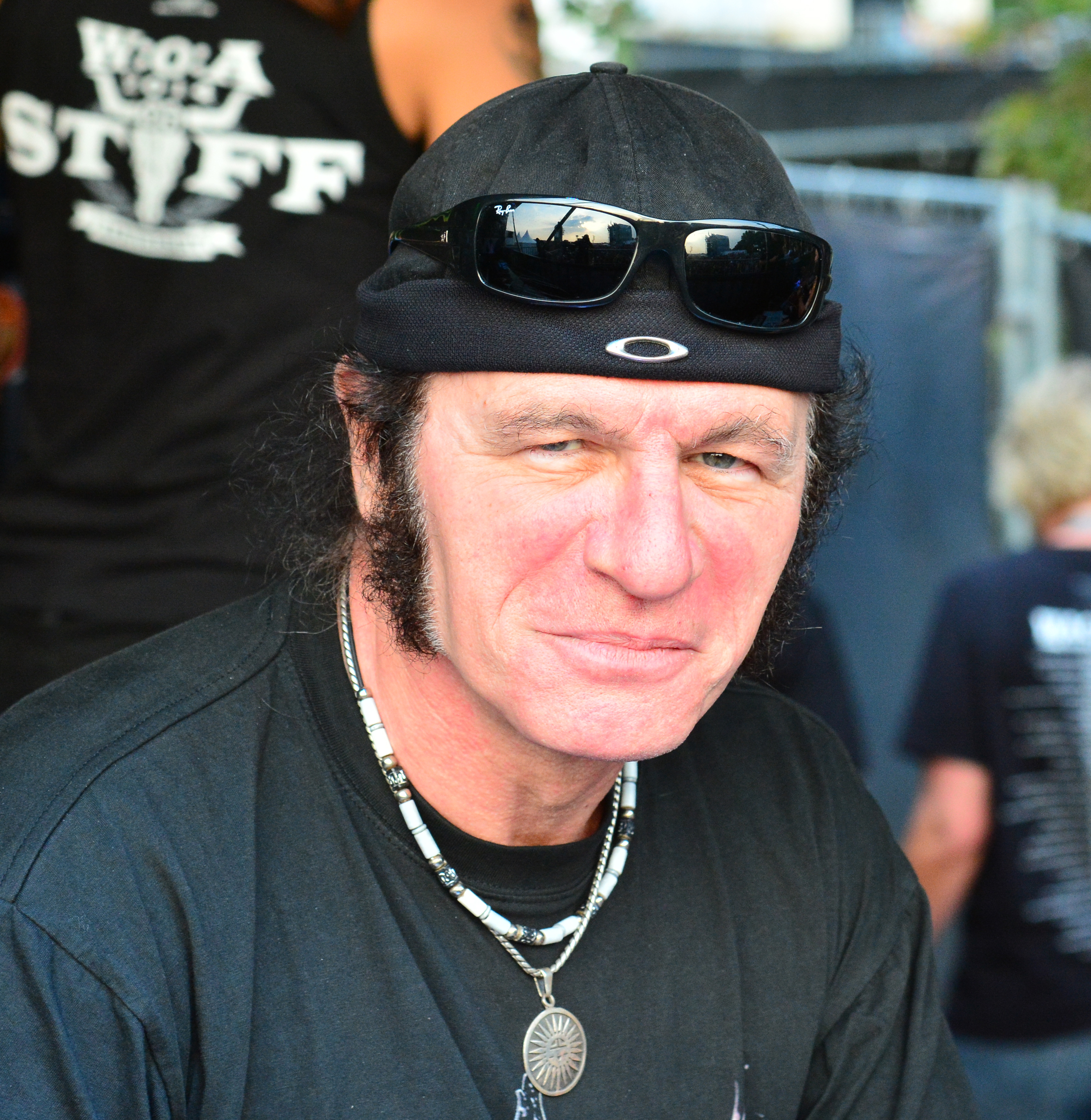
Frank at Wacken Open Air with Accept in 2014

=== Band albums ===
Accept

- 1982 – Restless and Wild (Credited but does not play on album)
- 1983 – Balls to the Wall
- 2010 – Blood of the Nations
- 2012 – Stalingrad
- 2014 – Blind Rage

Hazzard

- 1983 – Hazzard

Sinner

- 1985 – Touch of Sin

The Element

- 1985 – Time

Victory

- 1986 – Don't Get Mad ... Get Even
- 1987 – Hungry Hearts
- 1989 – Culture Killed the Native
- 1990 – Temples of Gold
- 1992 – You Bought It – You Name It
- 2003 – Instinct
- 2006 – Fuel to the Fire
- 2011 – Don't Talk Science
- 2021 – Gods of Tomorrow
- 2024 – Circle of Life

Moon'Doc

- 1995 – Moon'Doc
- 1996 – Get Mooned
- 2000 – Realm of Legends

ja:Saeko

- 2004 – Above Heaven, Below Heaven

Thomsen

- 2009 – Let's Get Ruthless

Poison Sun

- 2010 – Virtual Sin

Panzer

- 2014 – Send Them All To Hell

=== Solo albums ===
- 2009 – Loyal to None
- 2012 – Right in the Guts
- 2016 – The Devil Rides Out
- 2019 – Fight the Fear
- 2021 – Two for a Lie

== Bibliography ==
- Matthias Blazek: Das niedersächsische Bandkompendium 1963–2003 – Daten und Fakten von 100 Rockgruppen aus Niedersachsen. Celle 2006, pp. 148–149. ISBN 978-3-00-018947-0.
