= Balls to the Wall (album) =

Studio album by Accept
- Released: 1983
- Recorded: July and August 1983
- Studios: Dierks (Stommeln, Germany)
- Genre: Heavy metal
- Length: 45:13
- Label: RCA
- Producer: Accept

Accept chronology
Restless and Wild (1982)	Balls to the Wall (1983)	Metal Heart (1985)

Singles from Balls to the Wall
- 1. "Balls to the Wall" Released: April 1984

Balls to the Wall is the fifth studio album by German heavy metal band Accept, released in 1983. It is Accept's only record to attain Gold certification in the US. The album's title track became Accept's signature song and remains a metal anthem and trademark in the genre.

== Album information ==
A controversy followed the American release, due to the record's title and front cover seen as homoerotic, and the lyrics to "London Leatherboys" and "Love Child" were interpreted to concern homosexuals. Guitarist Wolf Hoffmann was dismissive of the controversy, saying years later that "You Americans are so uptight about this. In Europe it was never a big deal...we just wanted to be controversial and different and touch on these touchy subjects, because it gave us good press and it worked fabulously, you know". Drummer Stefan Kaufmann explained that many of the themes on the album were about oppressed minorities in general. "London Leatherboys" was really about bikers, for example: "They're normal people, they just look different and they behave different. But they're normal people, another minority. And 'Love Child' was about gays, true, but it's basically about people who are suppressed." Concerning the homosexuality issues themselves, Kaufmann said in an interview with French magazine Enfer (n°7, 1983):

"It's a phenomenon that should be taken into consideration. Because it exists on a wide scale and should be demystified. In fact, this is a phenomenon of society that needs to be taken as such. For a long time gay people have been considered as sick or insane. And yet, it's time to respect these people, open our minds which are often closed."

Hoffmann's wife, lyricist Gaby Hauke, also denied these suggestions concerning the controversy:

"Let me answer this and (the next) question in one, ok? I have been very rebellious and by no means I would have written anything 'normal'! Never! The sexual question about the context of certain lyrics are mind games and pure interpretation from outsiders. This is a band who has as individuals -so little to do with controversy and absolutely nothing in particular with anything but being VERY straight."

This album was the only Accept album which guitarist Herman Frank played on until 2010's Blood of the Nations (though he was given credit on 1982's Restless and Wild).

Professional wrestler Chris Jericho's band, Fozzy, did their own cover of the song "Balls to the Wall".

== Release ==
There are two different remasters of this album. The first is part of Sony's The Metal Masters Series while the second is part of the BMG Remastered Edition. Both editions feature songs taken from the live EP Kaizoku-Ban.

The 2013 release from UK record label Hear No Evil Recordings contains the 1990 live album Staying a Life.

== Reception ==
Professional ratings
Review scores
Source	Rating
AllMusic	4.5/5 stars
Collector's Guide to Heavy Metal	10/10
The Metal Crypt	5/5 stars

Balls to the Wall received positive reviews and was praised by Accept's contemporaries and successors. Ty Tabor of the American rock band King's X was a fan of the album and its production, saying that it "set a new bar for what heavy rock could sound like on a record". Doro Pesch of Warlock and Kai Hansen of Helloween were all fans of the band and consider Accept among their main musical influences. The Swedish power metal band HammerFall said they recorded their album Renegade in 2000 with Michael Wagener because they had Balls to the Wall in mind.

Canadian critic Martin Popoff liked the complexity of the lyrics combined with the clean and restrained riffing, which give the album "subtle sophistication" and a "singular purpose". He put Balls to the Wall at No. 1 of his Top 100 Heavy Metal Albums of the '80s list. Eduardo Rivadavia of AllMusic refers to it as an "essential heavy metal album", only "slightly more melodic" and "less gritty" than Restless and Wild and considers the title track "an irresistible, fist-pumping masterpiece that came to epitomize the modern, slow-marching metal anthem as it became known." According to Pierre Bégin of the online magazine The Metal Crypt, the album "is simply pure heavy metal", with "no weak tracks" and a masterpiece.

Balls to the Wall was Accept's first album to chart in the United States, where it peaked at number 74 on the Billboard 200, making it the band's highest chart position in that country for over 30 years until the release of Blind Rage in 2014. It was also the band's first album to chart in Germany, where it peaked at number 59.

== Track listings ==
All lyrics are written by Accept and Deaffy; all music is composed by Accept.

Side one
No.	Title	Length
1.	"Balls to the Wall"	5:45
2.	"London Leatherboys"	3:57
3.	"Fight It Back"	3:30
4.	"Head Over Heels"	4:19
5.	"Losing More Than You've Ever Had"	5:04

Side two
No.	Title	Length
6.	"Love Child"	3:35
7.	"Turn Me On"	5:12
8.	"Losers and Winners"	4:19
9.	"Guardian of the Night"	4:25
10.	"Winter Dreams"	4:45

2001 remastered edition bonus tracks
No.	Title	Length
11.	"Head Over Heels" (live)	5:53
12.	"Love Child" (live)	4:58

2002 remastered edition bonus tracks
No.	Title	Length
11.	"Up to the Limit" (live)	4:53
12.	"Head Over Heels" (live)	5:58

== Personnel ==
Accept

- Udo Dirkschneider – vocals
- Wolf Hoffmann – guitar
- Herman Frank – guitar
- Peter Baltes – bass
- Stefan Kaufmann – drums

Production

- Louis Austin – engineer
- Michael Wagener – mixing
- Jean Lessenich – design
- Dieter Eikelpoth – photos
- Gaby "Deaffy" Hauke – cover idea

== Charts ==
Chart (1983–1984)	Peak position
Canada Top Albums/CDs (RPM)	43
German Albums (Offizielle Top 100)	59
Swedish Albums (Sverigetopplistan)	10
US Billboard 200	74

== Certifications ==
Region	Certification	Certified units/sales
Canada (Music Canada)	Gold	50,000^{^}
United States (RIAA)	Gold	500,000^{^}
^{^} Shipments figures based on certification alone.
