= Wolf Hoffmann =

German guitarist (born 1959)

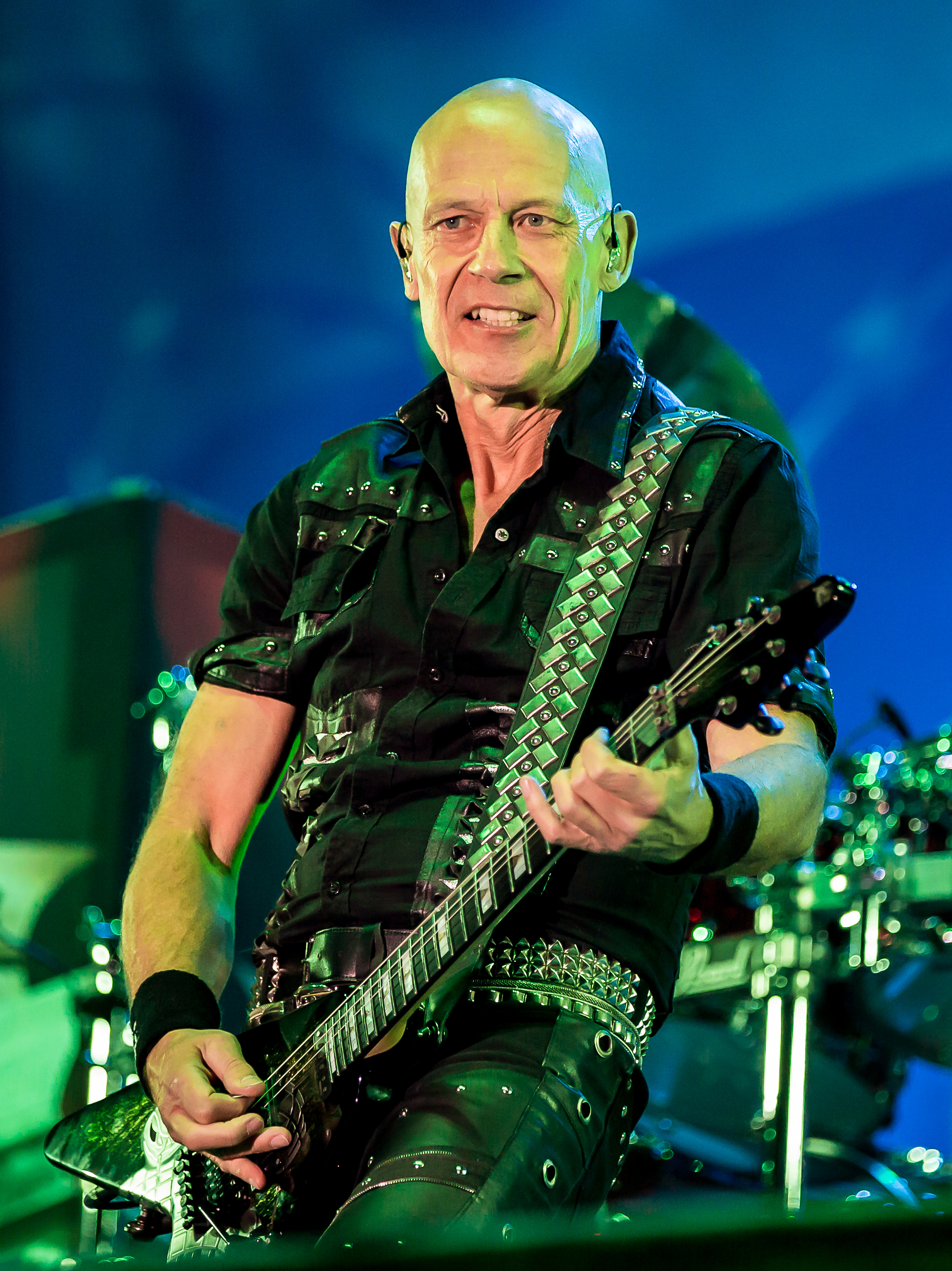
- Hoffmann in 2022

Background information
- Born: 10 December 1959 (age 66)
- Origin: Mainz, West Germany
- Genres: Heavy metal, speed metal, hard rock, neoclassical metal
- Occupation: Guitarist
- Member of: Accept
- Website: wolfhoffmann.com

Wolf Hoffmann (born 10 December 1959) is a German musician, primarily known as the guitarist of heavy metal band Accept, having played in all of their lineups since 1976. Since Accept bassist Peter Baltes's departure in 2018, Hoffmann has been the band's longest-lasting member. His work in Accept influenced the development of speed metal, and he is also considered one of the first neoclassical metal players.

Hoffmann has released two neoclassical solo albums, Classical (1997) and Headbangers Symphony (2016).

== Early life ==
Wolf Hoffmann was born on 10 December 1959 in Mainz, West Germany. He moved with his parents to Wuppertal at the age of six. His father was a chemistry professor and his mother a housewife. The parents hoped their son would go to university and pursue an academic career. However, Hoffmann became interested in playing the guitar and got his first acoustic guitar from his parents by promising to take playing lessons.

Hoffmann was not enthusiastic about playing the acoustic guitar and took playing lessons only for a year. His passion for playing returned after he got his first electric guitar. While studying in middle school, Hoffmann played the guitar with his friends every day. There were the occasional bands that would usually last only a few rehearsals. Rehearsals were mostly for hanging out and having fun. Hoffmann attended a prestigious high school and was particularly successful in ancient Greek and Latin. Though he was coaxed by his parents and teachers to pursue higher education and Hoffmann himself considered applying for a spot at a conservatory, he ultimately decided to continue building his nascent music career by committing fully to Accept.

== Career ==
=== Accept ===
At the end of 1975, Hoffmann heard in a local music store that a band called Accept was looking for a new guitarist. The band practiced in the nearby town of Solingen, only a 15-minute drive from Wuppertal. Hoffmann became Accept's guitarist a few weeks before his 17th birthday. Accept was not like the random groups of friends that Hoffmann had played in before. The band members took practice seriously, and they also played gigs locally.

After bassist Peter Baltes joined the band half a year after Hoffmann, they started composing new songs for the band together. Their collaboration continued for more than 40 years, and they made most of Accept's songs. Since Restless and Wild Hoffmann has played the majority of all the guitar parts on Accept's studio albums, although the entire band is typically listed on the records.

Hoffmann has released 16 studio albums with Accept. The first album Accept was released in 1979. In the 1980s the band released seven albums: I'm a Rebel, Breaker, Restless and Wild, Balls to the Wall, Metal Heart, Russian Roulette, and Eat the Heat. In 1989 the band broke up, and it returned in 1992 with the album Objection Overruled. Hoffmann made two more albums, Death Row and Predator, with Accept before the band disbanded again in 1997. Accept made a comeback with Hoffmann in 2009. Since then, the band has released the albums Blood of the Nations, Stalingrad, Blind Rage, The Rise of Chaos, and Too Mean to Die.

In July 2022, Hoffmann revealed that he has started writing material for the next Accept album that will possibly be released in 2023.

=== Solo works ===
In 1997, Hoffmann released the album Classical with rock versions of classical music works. Hoffmann's second solo album, Headbangers Symphony, was released in July 2016. On the first album, Hoffmann reduced the music to mainly just guitar, while on the second album, he included an orchestra. However, both albums have the same basic idea: they have well-known classical compositions, of which Hoffmann has made his own rock/metal adaptations.

Hoffmann's long-time dream of performing together with a symphony orchestra on stage came true in 2017 at the Wacken Open Air Festival, when he performed Headbangers Symphony songs for the first time in front of an audience with the Czech Symphony Orchestra. The concert was available as a live stream on the festival's website and was also released as a live album and DVD Accept – Symphonic Terror Live at Wacken 2017. In April 2019, Accept started the Symphonic Terror tour, which also included songs from Wolf Hoffmann's first solo album, Classical.

In July 2022, Hoffmann told that he has worked some tracks and ideas for a third neoclassical solo album but it will not be released in the near future.

=== Work with other musicians ===
He contributed to Skid Row vocalist Sebastian Bach's solo album Bring 'Em Bach Alive! and to a 2000 Japanese tribute to Randy Rhoads album called Randy Rhoads Tribute with Sebastian Bach on "I Don't Know" and with Joe Lynn Turner on "Diary of a Madman". Hoffmann also contributed to Peace Breaker by Skew Siskin.

== Instruments ==
During the 2013 NAMM Show, Hoffmann has unveiled a new signature guitar which was manufactured by Framus. This guitar is manufactured in two styles, a guitar in white called Flying Fortress and the other one is in chrome and has been made to resemble a World War II bomber which is called Flying Fortress. Hoffmann told Metal Shock Finland's chief editor, Mohsen Fayyazi:

"Growing up in Germany everybody had a Framus guitar at one point or another and I could have never anticipated that one day I would be friends with Hans Peter Wilfer, the man behind the re-birth of his father's legendary brand. I had no idea what an amazing company they really are until I went to their factory and saw first hand the unbelievable craftsmanship and quality they deliver. I am happy and proud to introduce my first signature guitar, a real Heavy Metal Axe made in Germany!"

In addition, Hoffman was a heavy user of Gibson Flying V's and Fender Stratocasters during Accept's prime in the 1980s, guitars that he still uses periodically today. Hoffman has also played guitars by various other companies such as Jackson guitars, most notably a custom Jackson King V, a guitar he still uses presently. He has also periodically played Fernandes guitars.

== Personal life ==
Hoffmann has loved photography as a hobby early on, and eventually made it his second career. He took the cover photo for 1993's Objection Overruled. During Accept's hiatus from 1997, Hoffmann worked as a professional photographer. He continued to photograph for a few years after Accept's comeback in the 2010s until he quit professional photography due to lack of time.

Hoffmann is currently based both in Nashville, Tennessee, and Florida. He also maintains a residence in Berlin. Hoffmann was married to Gaby Hoffmann (née Hauke), who used to be Accept's manager. She contributed to Accept's songwriting under the pseudonym Deaffy.

Now Wolf is in a relationship with Ava-Rebekah Rahman, who had accompanied the band on the European Orchestra Tour "Symphonic Terror" in 2019 as a violinist.

== Discography ==
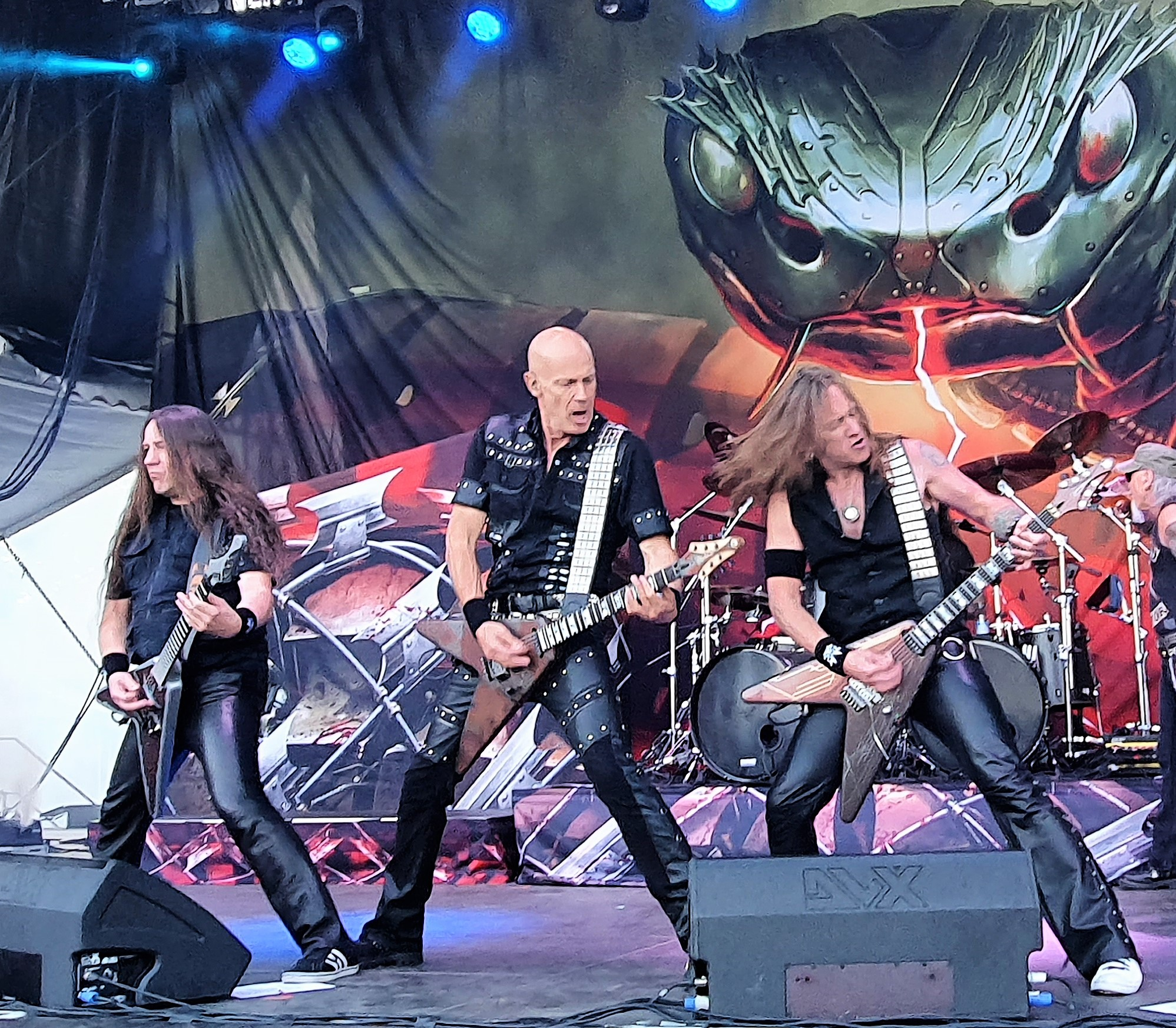
Hoffmann (center) performing with Accept in 2022

=== Solo ===
- Classical (1997)
- Headbangers Symphony (2016)

=== Accept ===
- Accept (1979)
- I'm a Rebel (1980)
- Breaker (1981)
- Restless and Wild (1982)
- Balls to the Wall (1983)
- Metal Heart (1985)
- Russian Roulette (1986)
- Eat the Heat (1989)
- Objection Overruled (1993)
- Death Row (1994)
- Predator (1996)
- Blood of the Nations (2010)
- Stalingrad (2012)
- Blind Rage (2014)
- The Rise of Chaos (2017)
- Too Mean to Die (2021)
- Humanoid (2024)
