= Stefan Schwarzmann =

German drummer

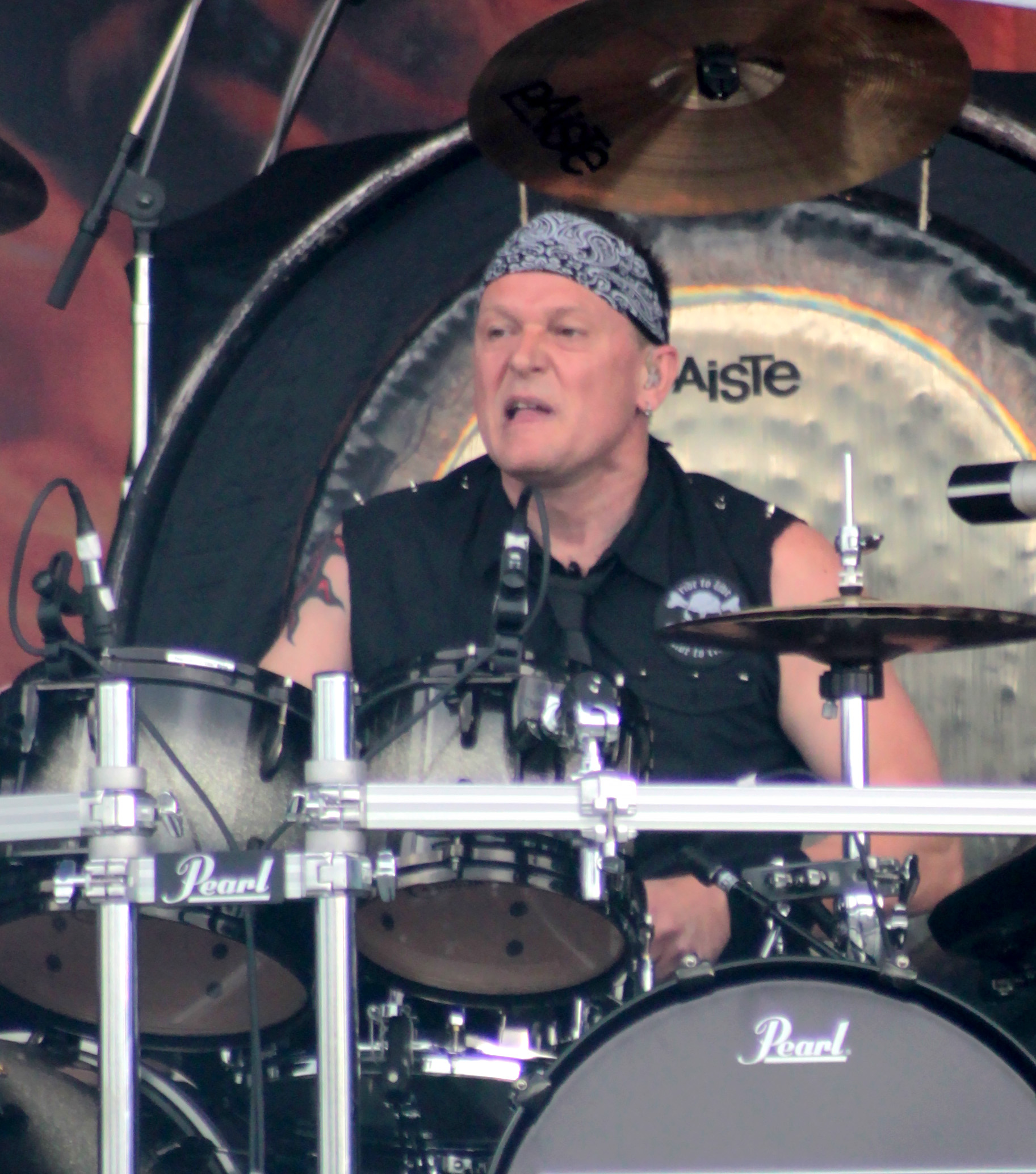
- Schwarzmann with Accept at Hellfest 2013

Background information
- Born: 11 November 1965 (age 60)
- Genres: Power metal, heavy metal
- Occupation: Drummer
- Website: stefanschwarzmann.com

Stefan Schwarzmann (born 11 November 1965) is a German heavy metal drummer who has recorded for Accept, U.D.O., Running Wild, X-Wild, Krokus and Helloween. Schwarzmann joined Helloween as a replacement for departing drummer Mark Cross in 2003. Although Stefan got on well with the members of the band, he had other musical preferences. As a result, he chose to leave Helloween after the Rabbits on the Run Tour in early 2005.

In 2012, Schwarzmann and guitarist Mille Petrozza were contracted to record the album Revolution with Lacrimosa.

== Equipment ==
Schwarzmann currently endorses Pearl drums, Aquarian drumheads, Wincent drumsticks, and Paiste cymbals:

- Signature 18" heavy china
- Signature 14" sound edge hi-hats
- Signature 19" full crash
- Signature 20" full crash
- 2002 20" crash
- Signature Dark Energy Mark l 20" dark dry ride
- 2002 14" sound edge hi-hats
- 2002 20" novo china
- Signature reflector 22" heavy full rash
