= 2016 in heavy metal music =

This is a timeline documenting the events of heavy metal in the year 2016.

== Bands formed ==
- Cellar Darling
- Invidia
- Lovebites
- Memoriam
- Nothing Left
- Pillorian
- Prophets of Rage
- Sinsaenum
- Spiritbox
- Vimic
- VUUR
- Xavlegbmaofffassssitimiwoamndutroabcwapwaeiippohfffx

== Bands disbanded ==
- Agalloch
- Bolt Thrower
- Crucified Barbara
- Eths
- For Today
- I, the Breather
- Kylesa (hiatus)
- Lionheart
- ReVamp
- Scar the Martyr
- Sockweb
- Twisted Sister
- Wodensthrone

== Bands reformed ==
- Abandon All Ships
- Akercocke
- Battlelore (hiatus from 2011 to 2016)
- Decadence
- Demolition Hammer
- Destroy the Runner
- Esprit D'Air
- Evildead
- Massacration
- Massacre
- Nasty Savage
- Nitro
- The Obsessed
- Pestilence
- Power Quest
- Ratt
- Scissorfight
- The Union Underground

== Events ==
- On April 28, 2015, Black Sabbath announced that they will embark on their final tour.
- On July 5, 2015, Blackmore's Night and former Deep Purple and Rainbow guitarist Ritchie Blackmore announced that he will briefly return to rock music by performing a few shows in June.
- On January 14, Lacuna Coil announced that guitarist Marco Biazzi has left the band.
- On February 10, Skeletonwitch announced Adam Clemans as their new vocalist.
- On February 20, Suicidal Tendencies announced Dave Lombardo (formerly of Slayer) as the drummer for their U.S. tour with Megadeth, which took place in February and March. Lombardo will drum for Suicidal Tendencies again on their summer European tour.
- On March 19, Underoath played their first show since disbanding in 2013 at Self Help Festival in California.
- On March 31, Martin Henriksson announced that he has quit Dark Tranquillity due to loss of passion for playing music.
- On April 16 and 23, Guns N' Roses reunited with their original guitarist Slash and bassist Duff McKagan for this year's Coachella.
- On April 16, Overkill played a special show in Oberhausen where they played the Feel the Fire and Horrorscope albums in their entirety. The show was professionally filmed and recorded for an upcoming DVD.
- On May 5, Eluveitie announced that they parted ways with drummer Merlin Sutter, vocalist Anna Murphy and guitarist Ivo Henzi.
- On May 20, Megadeth announced that Soilwork drummer Dirk Verbeuren was joining as their touring drummer, filling in for then-drummer Chris Adler. On July 15, however, Verbeuren was announced their full-time drummer, after Adler left the band.
- On August 6 and 7, Heavy Montreal took place presented by Evenko, and headliners were Nightwish, Disturbed, Five Finger Death Punch, Volbeat and Candlemass.
- On November 15, 2016, German power metal band Helloween announced tour dubbed "Pumpkins United", celebrating 30 years of Keeper of the Seven Keys: Part I and Keeper of the Seven Keys: Part II, with former members Michael Kiske and Kai Hansen joining Helloween's Keeper of the Seven Keys: The Legacy line-up. The "Pumpkins United" line-up entered in the studio at the end of the tour and recorded what would end up being their self titled album.

== Deaths ==
- January 14 – Kevin Lawrence, guitarist of Rapidfire, died from multiple heart attacks at the age of 51.
- January 23 – Jimmy Bain, bassist of Rainbow and Dio, died from lung cancer at the age of 68.
- February 21 – Piotr Grudziński, guitarist of Riverside, died from sudden cardiac arrest at the age of 40.
- March 3 – John Thomas, former guitarist of Budgie, died from undisclosed reasons at the age of 63.
- March 3 – Oskar Karlsson, drummer of Gates of Ishtar, died from heart failure at the age of 39.
- March 13 – Nik Green, keyboardist of Blue Murder, died from cancer.
- April 5 – John Byrd, former guitarist of King Conquer, died from substance abuse.
- April 18 – Aleah Liane Stanbridge, vocalist of Trees of Eternity, died from cancer at the age of 39.
- May 21 – Nick Menza, former drummer of Megadeth, died from heart failure at the age of 51.
- May 31 – Brandon Ferrell, former drummer of Municipal Waste, died from undisclosed reasons.
- June 9 – Adam Young, multi-instrumentalist of Sockweb, died after committing suicide by hanging himself at the age of 28.
- August 13 – Jerry Clyde Paradis, former drummer of The Gates of Slumber and Sourvein, died from undisclosed reasons.
- August 17 – James Woolley, former keyboardist of Nine Inch Nails, died from undisclosed reasons at the age of 49.
- August 21 – Tom Searle, guitarist of Architects, died from cancer at the age of 28.
- August 25 – Norman Killeen, former drummer of Threat Signal, died from undisclosed reasons at the age of 38.
- September 10 – Pecu Cinnari, drummer of Tarot, died from a long-term illness at the age of 50.
- September 11 – Leonard Haze, former drummer of Y&T, died from chronic obstructive pulmonary disease at the age of 61.
- September 27 – Mike Taylor, former vocalist of Quartz, died from undisclosed reasons.
- September 27 – Brodie Wheeler, former guitarist of King Conquer, died from substance abuse.
- December 5 – Adam Sagan, former drummer of Circle II Circle and Into Eternity, died from blood cancer at the age of 36.
- December 23 – Mick Zane, guitarist of Malice, died from brain cancer.

== Albums released ==
=== January ===
Day	Artist	Album
7	Autograph	Louder (EP)
8	Cauldron	In Ruin
8	Exmortus	Ride Forth
8	Jeff Hughell	Trinidad Scorpion Hallucinations
15	Aborted	Termination Redux (EP)
15	Axel Rudi Pell	Game of Sins
15	Rhapsody of Fire	Into the Legend
15	Witchcraft	Nucleus
20	Black Sabbath	The End (EP)
22	Abbath	Abbath
22	Borknagar	Winter Thrice
22	Megadeth	Dystopia
22	Rage	My Way (EP)
22	The Resistance	Coup de Grâce
29	Amoral	In Sequence
29	Avantasia	Ghostlights
29	Black Tusk	Pillars of Ash
29	Bury Tomorrow	Earthbound
29	Conan	Revengeance
29	Dream Theater	The Astonishing
29	Exumer	The Raging Tides
29	Master	An Epiphany of Hate
29	Primal Fear	Rulebreaker
29	Prong	X (No Absolutes)
29	Serenity	Codex Atlanticus

=== February ===
Day	Artist	Album
5	The Cult	Hidden City
5	Drowning Pool	Hellelujah
5	Fleshgod Apocalypse	King
5	Obscura	Akróasis
5	Textures	Phenotype
12	Holy Grail	Times of Pride and Peril
12	Magrudergrind	II
12	Rotting Christ	Rituals
12	Urgehal	Aeons in Sodom
19	Adept	Sleepless
19	After the Burial	Dig Deep
19	Cirith Gorgor	Visions of Exalted Lucifer
19	Delain	Lunar Prelude (EP)
19	Hypno5e	Shores of the Abstract Line
19	Karybdis	Samsara
19	Last in Line	Heavy Crown
19	Myrath	Legacy
19	Raubtier	Bärsärkagång
26	Anthrax	For All Kings
26	Anvil	Anvil Is Anvil
26	Black Cobra	Imperium Simulacra
26	Deströyer 666	Wildfire
26	Entombed A.D.	Dead Dawn
26	Headspace	All That You Fear Is Gone
26	Omnium Gatherum	Grey Heavens
26	Redemption	The Art of Loss
26	Sinbreed	Master Creator
26	The Unguided	Lust and Loathing
26	Voivod	Post Society (EP)
26	Wisdom	Rise of the Wise
27	Jet Jaguar	Zero Hour (EP)

=== March ===
Day	Artist	Album
4	Hacktivist	Outside the Box
4	Reckless Love	InVader
11	Criminal	Fear Itself
11	Killswitch Engage	Incarnate
11	Van Canto	Voices of Fire
15	Pyrrhon	Running Out of Skin (EP)
18	Blaze Bayley	Infinite Entanglement
18	Circus Maximus	Havoc
18	Convulse	Cycle of Revenge
18	Human Fortress	Thieves of the Night
18	Mob Rules	Tales from Beyond
18	Mystic Prophecy	War Brigade
18	Spiritual Beggars	Sunrise to Sundown
18	The Word Alive	Dark Matter
25	American Head Charge	Tango Umbrella
25	Amon Amarth	Jomsviking
25	Artillery	Penalty by Perception
25	Asking Alexandria	The Black
25	Blood Ceremony	Lord of Misrule
25	Caliban	Gravity
25	Dayglo Abortions	Armageddon Survival Guide
25	Izegrim	The Ferryman's End
25	Lody Kong	Dreams and Visions
25	Metal Church	XI
25	Rotten Sound	Abuse to Suffer
25	Ragnarok	Psychopathology
25	Split Heaven	Death Rider
25	Walls of Jericho	No One Can Save You from Yourself

=== April ===
Day	Artist	Album
1	Babymetal	Metal Resistance
1	Bossk	Audio Noir
1	Mike & the Melvins	Three Men and a Baby
1	Moonsorrow	Jumalten aika
1	Novembre	URSA
1	Thunderstone	Apocalypse Again
8	Deftones	Gore
8	Filter	Crazy Eyes
8	Ihsahn	Arktis
8	Zakk Wylde	Book of Shadows II
15	Ace Frehley	Origins, Vol. 1 (covers album)
15	Crematory	Monument
15	Lita Ford	Time Capsule
15	Otep	Generation Doom
22	Aborted	Retrogore
22	Darkness Divided	Darkness Divided
22	Diamond Head	Diamond Head
22	Eths	Ankaa
22	The Foreshadowing	Seven Heads Ten Horns
22	Incite	Oppression
22	October Tide	Winged Waltz
22	Texas Hippie Coalition	Dark Side of Black
22	This Ending	Garden of Death
25	Darkend	The Canticle of Shadows
25	Tigertailz	Blast
26	Node	Cowards Empire
29	Darkestrah	Turan
29	Discharge	End of Days
29	Fallujah	Dreamless
29	Haken	Affinity
29	Nemesea	Uprise
29	Rob Zombie	The Electric Warlock Acid Witch Satanic Orgy Celebration Dispenser
29	Tremonti	Dust

=== May ===
Day	Artist	Album
6	Vektor	Terminal Redux
10	Femme Fatale	One More for the Road
13	Avatar	Feathers & Flesh
13	Destruction	Under Attack
13	DevilDriver	Trust No One
13	Gorguts	Pleiades' Dust (EP)
13	Grand Magus	Sword Songs
13	Hatebreed	The Concrete Confessional
13	Kvelertak	Nattesferd
20	Dead by Wednesday	The Darkest of Angels
20	Flotsam and Jetsam	Flotsam and Jetsam
20	Iron Savior	Titancraft
20	Katatonia	The Fall of Hearts
20	Suidakra	Realms of Odoric
20	Vardis	Red Eye
24	Binary Code	Moonsblood
27	Architects	All Our Gods Have Abandoned Us
27	Behexen	The Poisonous Path
27	Death Angel	The Evil Divide
27	Illdisposed	Grey Sky Over Black Town
27	Katalepsy	Gravenous Hour
27	Lacuna Coil	Delirium
27	Motörhead	Clean Your Clock (live album)
27	Omen	Hammer Damage
27	Six Feet Under	Graveyard Classics IV: The Number of the Priest (covers album)
27	Suicidal Angels	Division of Blood
27	Withered	Grief Relic

=== June ===
Day	Artist	Album
1	Yngwie Malmsteen	World on Fire
3	Beartooth	Aggressive
3	Candlemass	Death Thy Lover (EP)
3	Dark Funeral	Where Shadows Forever Reign
3	Dark Suns	Everchild
3	Hellyeah	Unden!able
3	Paradox	Pangea
3	Poverty's No Crime	Spiral of Fear
3	Volbeat	Seal the Deal & Let's Boogie
10	D.R.I.	But Wait... There's More! (EP)
10	Rage	The Devil Strikes Again
10	Scorpion Child	Acid Roulette
10	Sumac	What One Becomes
17	Ayreon	The Theater Equation (live album)
17	Gojira	Magma
17	Hammercult	Legends Never Die (EP)
17	Nails	You Will Never Be One of Us
17	Unlocking the Truth	Chaos
24	Be'lakor	Vessels
24	The Browning	Isolation
24	Highlord	Hic Sunt Leones
24	Kayo Dot	Plastic House on Base of Sky
24	Stuck Mojo	Here Come the Infidels
24	Whitechapel	Mark of the Blade

=== July ===
Day	Artist	Album
1	Chelsea Grin	Self Inflicted
1	Fates Warning	Theories of Flight
1	Oracles	Miserycorde
1	Wolf Hoffmann	Headbangers Symphony
2	Brain Drill	Boundless Obscenity
8	Centinex	Doomsday Rituals
8	Chevelle	The North Corridor
8	Deadlock	Hybris
8	Dust Bolt	Mass Confusion
8	Nonpoint	The Poison Red
8	Trick or Treat	Rabbits' Hill, Pt. 2
8	Wolverine	Machina Viva
15	16	Lifespan of a Moth
15	Raging Speedhorn	Lost Ritual
15	Scour	Scour (EP)
22	Black Crown Initiate	Selves We Cannot Forgive
22	Despised Icon	Beast
22	Despite	Synergi
22	Hammers of Misfortune	Dead Revolution
22	Periphery	Periphery III: Select Difficulty
22	Revocation	Great Is Our Sin
22	Twisted Sister	Metal Meltdown (live album)
22	Witherscape	The Northern Sanctuary
29	Ghoul	Dungeon Bastards
29	Infant Annihilator	The Elysian Grandeval Galèriarch
29	Ringworm	Snake Church
29	Sinsaenum	Echoes of the Tortured

=== August ===
Day	Artist	Album
5	Bloody Hammers	Lovely Sort of Death
5	Carnifex	Slow Death
5	Islander	Power Under Control
5	Jackyl	Rowyco
5	Skillet	Unleashed
5	Tarja	The Shadow Self
12	The Amity Affliction	This Could Be Heartbreak
12	Equilibrium	Armageddon
12	Lacrimas Profundere	Hope Is Here
19	Blood Incantation	Starspawn
19	Gemini Syndrome	Memento Mori
19	Myrkur	Mausoleum (live album)
19	Sabaton	The Last Stand
19	Skeletonwitch	The Apothic Gloom (EP)
20	Throes of Dawn	Our Voices Shall Remain
26	Ablaze My Sorrow	Black
26	Any Given Day	Everlasting
26	Delain	Moonbathers
26	DGM	The Passage
26	Helstar	Vampiro
26	Inquisition	Bloodshed Across the Empyrean Altar Beyond the Celestial Zenith
26	Michael Sweet	One Sided War
26	Prophets of Rage	The Party's Over (EP)
26	Running Wild	Rapid Foray
26	Sodom	Decision Day
26	Solution .45	Nightmares in the Waking State: Part II
26	Twelve Foot Ninja	Outlier
26	Vicious Rumors	Concussion Protocol

=== September ===
Day	Artist	Album
2	A Day to Remember	Bad Vibrations
2	Art of Dying	Nevermore (EP)
2	Goblin Cock	Necronomidonkeykongimicon
9
9	Devin Townsend Project	Transcendence
9	Evergrey	The Storm Within
9	KMFDM	Rocks – Milestones Reloaded
9	Norma Jean	Polar Similar
9	Of Mice & Men	Cold World
9	Pain	Coming Home
9	Power Quest	Face the Raven (EP)
9	Rev Theory	The Revelation
16	Ancient	Back to the Land of the Dead
16	Brujeria	Pocho Aztlan
16	Finsterforst	#Yølø (EP)
16	Ghost	Popestar (EP)
16	Heaven Shall Burn	Wanderer
16	In the Woods...	Pure
16	Iron Fire	Among the Dead
16	King 810	La Petite Mort or a Conversation with God
16	Lordi	Monstereophonic (Theaterror vs. Demonarchy)
16	Narnia	Narnia
16	Temperance	The Earth Embraces Us All
16	Thy Catafalque	Meta
23	Allegaeon	Proponent for Sentience
23	Almah	E.V.O
23	Charred Walls of the Damned	Creatures Watching Over the Dead
23	Dysrhythmia	The Veil of Control
23	Every Time I Die	Low Teens
23	Grim Reaper	Walking in the Shadows
23	Insomnium	Winter's Gate
23	Iron Mask	Diabolica
23	Monte Pittman	Inverted Grasp of Balance
23	Neurosis	Fires Within Fires
23	Operation: Mindcrime	Resurrection
23	Saint Vitus	Live Vol. 2 (live album)
23	Trap Them	Crown Feral
30	The Agonist	Five
30	Alcest	Kodama
30	Asphyx	Incoming Death
30	Epica	The Holographic Principle
30	Negură Bunget	ZI
30	Oathbreaker	Rheia
30	Opeth	Sorceress
30	Seven Kingdoms	In the Walls (EP)
30	Skálmöld	Vögguvísur Yggdrasils
30	Skiltron	Legacy of Blood
30	Suicidal Tendencies	World Gone Mad
30	Truckfighters	V
30	Winterfylleth	The Dark Hereafter

=== October ===
Day	Artist	Album
7	Alter Bridge	The Last Hero
7	Candiria	While They Were Sleeping
7	The Devil Wears Prada	Transit Blues
7	Fit for a King	Deathgrip
7	Kyng	Breathe in the Water
7	Leaves' Eyes	Fires in the North (EP)
7	Meshuggah	The Violent Sleep of Reason
7	Mouth of the Architect	Path of Eight
7	Slaves on Dope	Horse
7	Sonata Arctica	The Ninth Hour
7	Watchtower	Concepts of Math: Book One (EP)
14	Anciients	Voice of the Void
14	Darkthrone	Arctic Thunder
14	The Dillinger Escape Plan	Dissociation
14	Hardline	Human Nature
14	Heaven Below	Good Morning Apocalypse
14	Hobbs' Angel of Death	Heaven Bled
14	Kayser	IV: Beyond the Reef of Sanity
14	Red Fang	Only Ghosts
14	Sacred Steel	Heavy Metal Sacrifice
14	Secret Sphere	One Night in Tokyo (live album)
14	Sonic Syndicate	Confessions
14	Theatres des Vampires	Candyland
14	Wormrot	Voices
21	Amaranthe	Maximalism
21	Bon Jovi	This House Is Not for Sale
21	Destrage	A Means to No End
21	I Declare War	Songs for the Sick
21	Korn	The Serenity of Suffering
21	Thrown into Exile	Safe Inside
21	Tygers of Pan Tang	Tygers of Pan Tang
21	Wovenwar	Honor Is Dead
25	Wardrum	Awakening
28	Anaal Nathrakh	The Whole of the Law
28	Avenged Sevenfold	The Stage
28	Car Bomb	Meta
28	Crowbar	The Serpent Only Lies
28	Deranged	Struck by a Murderous Siege
28	Dope	Blood Money, Part 1
28	Helmet	Dead to the World
28	Krypts	Remnants of Expansion
28	Madder Mortem	Red in Tooth and Claw
28	Memphis May Fire	This Light I Hold
28	Painted in Exile	The Ordeal
28	Serpentine Dominion	Serpentine Dominion
28	Testament	Brotherhood of the Snake
28	Theocracy	Ghost Ship
28	Ulcerate	Shrines of Paralysis
28	Upon a Burning Body	Straight from the Barrio
28	Whores	Gold

=== November ===
Day	Artist	Album
4	Civil War	The Last Full Measure
4	Dark Tranquillity	Atoma
4	HammerFall	Built to Last
4	Pretty Maids	Kingmaker
4	Sick of It All	When the Smoke Clears (EP)
4	Starkill	Shadow Sleep
4	Vader	The Empire
8	Deathspell Omega	The Synarchy of Molten Bones (EP)
11	Animals as Leaders	The Madness of Many
11	In Flames	Battles
11	Sirenia	Dim Days of Dolor
11	Superjoint	Caught Up in the Gears of Application
11	Trees of Eternity	Hour of the Nightingale
14	Furia	Księżyc Milczy Luty
18	De La Tierra	II
18	Devilment	II – The Mephisto Waltzes
18	Diabulus in Musica	Dirge for the Archons
18	Freedom Call	Master of Light
18	Herman Frank	The Devil Rides Out
18	Ion Dissonance	Cast the First Stone
18	Lamb of God	The Duke (EP)
18	Metallica	Hardwired... to Self-Destruct
18	Protest the Hero	Pacific Myth (EP)
18	Soulburn	Earthless Pagan Spirit
21	Paul Wardingham	Spiritual Machines
25	Nightmare	Dead Sun
25	Witchery	In His Infernal Majesty's Service

=== December ===
Day	Artist	Album
2	Enuff Z'Nuff	Clowns Lounge
9	Babymetal	Live at Wembley (live album)
9	Destroy the Runner	Void (EP)
9	Those Who Fear	State of Mind
9	Zao	The Well-Intentioned Virus
16	Machinae Supremacy	Into the Night World
17	Rudra	Enemy of Duality
23	Nine Inch Nails	Not the Actual Events (EP)
30	Sister	Stand Up, Forward, March!

Preceded by 2015	Heavy Metal Timeline; 2016	Succeeded by 2017
