= III (Eths album) =

Studio album by Eths
- Released: 6 April 2012
- Recorded: Studio Fredman, Gothenburg, Sweden
- Genre: Death metal; melodic death metal; groove metal
- Length: 46:55 (standard edition); 58:53 (deluxe edition)
- Label: Season of Mist
- Producer: Fredrik Nordström

Eths chronology
Tératologie (2007)	III (2012)	Ankaa (2016)

Professional ratings
Review scores
Source	Rating
Metal Hammer	7/10 stars
Metal Underground	4/5 stars
The New Review	3/5 stars
Sputnikmusic	4/5 stars

III is the third studio album from the French metal band Eths, released on 6 April 2012. The release was delayed from the initially intended date of 2 March (Europe) and 12 March (North America). The album features a move towards more clean singing from frontwoman Candice Clot as well as versions of songs with either French or English lyrics, plus the return of drummer Guillaume Dupré. A music video for the song Adonaï was released on 12 March in both French and English versions. It is the last album to feature vocalist Candice Clot, who announced her departure from the group in September 2012. 3 videos have been released from this album: "Adonaï" (for both English and French versions), "Sidus" (with live vocalists Virginie Goncalves and Nelly Wood-Hasselhoff) and "Harmaguedon" (with new vocalist Rachel Aspe).

The songs "Gravis Venter" and "Adonaï", in their original French versions, were released for the Rock Band Network in May 2012.

== Track list ==
Note: Tracks "Voragine", "Adonaï", "Gravis Venter" and "Anatemnein" have alternate lyrics which differ between English and French versions

Disc One : III
No.	Title	Length
1.	"Voragine"	3:44
2.	"Harmaguedon"	4:48
3.	"Adonaï"	3:59
4.	"Gravis Venter"	5:03
5.	"Inanis Venter"	4:24
6.	"Sidus"	4:46
7.	"Proserpina"	5:44
8.	"Hercolubus"	5:04
9.	"Praedator"	1:35
10.	"Anatemnein"	7:41
Total length:		46:55

Special Edition
No.	Title	Length
11.	"Music" (Madonna cover)	3:57
12.	"7"	3:52
13.	"Cerebellum (iTunes bonus track)"	4:09
Total length:		58:53

Disc Two : Genesis (Limited Edition)
No.	Title	Length
1.	"Cerebellum"
2.	"Harmaguedon (Percussion Part)"
3.	"Gravis Venter (Orchestral Part)"
4.	"Proserpina (Orchestral Part)"
5.	"Hercolubus (Orchestral Part)"
6.	"Voragine (Demo Version)"
7.	"Harmaguedon (Demo Version)"
8.	"Adonaï (Demo Version)"
9.	"Gravis Venter (Demo Version)"
10.	"Inanis Venter (Demo Version)"
11.	"Sidus (Demo Version)"
12.	"Proserpina (Demo Version)"
13.	"Hercolubus (Demo Version)"
14.	"Praedator (Demo Version)"
15.	"Anatemnein (Demo Version)"
16.	"Music (Demo Version)"
17.	"Gravis Venter (Electronic Version)"
Total length:		57:04

== Personnel ==
Eths

- Candice Clot − Lead vocals
- Stéphane "Staif" Bihl − Guitar, Keyboards, Additional Vocals on "Inanis Venter"
- Grégory "Greg" Rouvière − Guitar
- Damien Rivoal − Bass
- Guillaume "Yom" Dupré - Drums, Percussion

Choir

- Naïra Abrahamyan - Soprano
- Marie-Hélène Beignet - Mezzo-Soprano
- Pierre Rodriguez - Tenor
- Patrick Alliote - Baryton-Bass

Production

- Orchestral parts performed by FILMharmonic Orchestra Prague
- Fredrik Nordström - production, mixing
- Henrik Udd - mixing
