= Under Attack (disambiguation) =

Under Attack may refer to:

- "Under Attack", a song by Swedish pop group ABBA
- Under Attack (The Alarm album), a song by Welsh band The Alarm (2006)
- "Under Attack", a song from the soundtrack of Danganronpa Another Episode: Ultra Despair Girls
- Under Attack (The Casualties album) (2006)
- Under Attack (Destruction album) (2016)
