= Darkestrah =

Kyrgyz pagan metal band

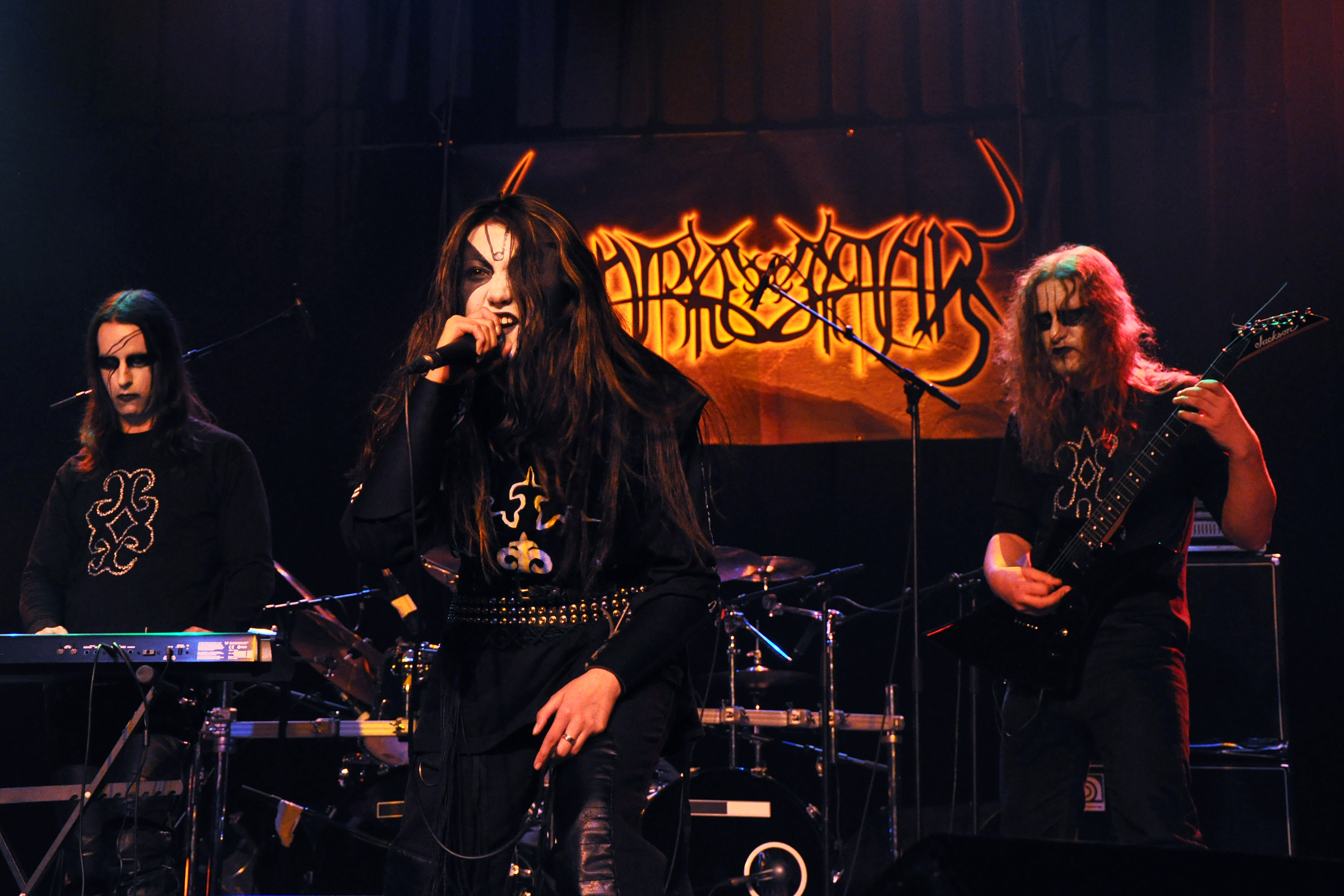
- Darkestrah at Crosne in 2009

Background information
- Origin: Bishkek, Kyrgyzstan
- Genres: Folk metal, black metal
- Years active: 1999–present
- Labels: Beverina; Casus Belli; Curse of KvN Sadistic; Narcoleptica; No Colours; Osmose; Paragon; Shaytan
- Members: Asbath; Charuk; Resurgemus; Cerritus; Magus /Cornelius
- Past members: Kriegtalith; Oldhan; Tartar; Anastasia; Sharthar; Shagan; Anti; Merkith; Warneus

Darkestrah is a Kyrgyz pagan metal band, formed in 1999 in Bishkek, Kyrgyzstan. Throughout their career the band has blended folklore music with metal elements. In its lyrics and in musical composition, the band uses national folk musical instruments, such as the komuz and kyl-kyak, and references shamanism and Tengrism. The band also takes influence from genres such as progressive rock and post-rock, generally constructing lengthy, rhythmically complex songs that often feature several discrete movements.

The word "Darkestrah" is a portmanteau of two words: "dark" and "orchestra"; however, in one interview, the band's drummer Asbath stated that there is still mystic and hidden meaning in the name of the band.

Since its formation in 1999, the band has released seven studio albums, three EPs, one split, and one live album.

== Biography ==
Darkestrah, the Kyrgyz Pagan metal group, was established in Bishkek, and their first demo, The Black Pagan Act was recorded in December 1999. In 2000 December, their second demo, Through the Ashes of Shamanic Flames was released by the German label Curse of KvN Sadistic. In 2003 February, the band recorded their first full-length album, Sary Oy, which appeared on the same label in January 2004. In this album, traditional folk songs with traditional Kyrgyz instruments were combined with metal. It is a concept album about a Kyrgyz legend.

In March 2004, the EP The Way to Paganism was recorded; the German label No Colours Records released on 14 April 2005, along with the full-length album Embrace of Memory on 25 October. In 2007 they recorded a new album, Epos, with a new studio called Kick the Flame Studio. Epos is almost fully dedicated to Issyk-kul Lake. It is filled with Pagan motives, and it consists of a single track that runs for more than thirty-three minutes.

In 2007, Darkestrah cut its ties with No Colours and it signed a contract with American Paragon Records. In 2008 March, they released their new album, The Great Silk Road. This earned them the attention of the French label Osmose Productions, on which they released the EP Khagan in 2011 and their fifth full-length album, Manas (based on the Kyrgyz Epic of Manas), in 2013.

The band's releases up to this point were fairly unique in the largely male-dominated world of black metal for featuring female vocalist Kriegtalith, who utilised occasional clean vocals and an unconventional style reminiscent of Tuvan throat singing alongside the traditional shrieks of black metal. She left the band in 2014, however.

An "official live bootleg", Everything Becomes Fire, was self-released in 2015; it was recorded in Germany in 2006. A split with the Saudi band Al-Namrood (Darkestrah's side being a re-recording of the track "Akyr Zaman", previous versions of which had appeared on Embrace of Memory and the multi-artist compilation Stimme aus der Tiefe #1), on the Canadian label Shaythan Productions, and Darkestrah's sixth full-length album Turan, again on Osmose, were both released in 2016. Shaythan Productions has also released vinyl editions of some of Darkestrah's back catalogue (thus far, Epos and The Great Silk Road). In 2019, Casus Belli Musica and Beverina Productions co-released the 5-CD boxed set 20th Anniversary Chronicles of Nomadic Conquest, which contained reissues of the band's first four albums (Sary Oy, Embrace of Memory, Epos, and The Great Silk Road) as well as the EP Khagan.

== Members ==
Current

- Asbath – drums (1999-present), percussion (2005-present)
- Resurgermus – keyboards (2004-2006, 2008-present), guitars (2004-2006, 2010-present)
- Cerritus – bass guitar (2013-present), temir-komuz (2020-present)
- Charuk – vocals, percussion (2020-present)
- Magus – traditional instruments (2020-present)

Past members

- Kriegtalith – vocals (1999-2014)
- Oldhan – guitar (1999-2004), vocals (2000-2004), bass, traditional instruments (2003-2004)
- Tartar – guitar (1999-2004)
- Anastasia – keyboard (2000-2004)
- Sharthar – keyboards, cello (2006-2007)
- Shagan – guitars (2005)
- Anti – guitars (2006-2011), bass (2006-2007, 2010-2011)
- Ragnar – guitars (2013-2015)
- Merkith – vocals (2016-2020)
- Scythe – guitar (2016-2017)
- Dushman – guitar (2016-2020)
- Warneus – guitar (2019-2020)

Timeline

== Discography ==
=== Studio albums ===
- Sary Oy (2004, Curse of KvN Sadistic / Narcoleptica Productions / Shaytan Productions)
- Embrace of Memory (2005, No Colours Records / Narcoleptica Productions / Shaytan Productions)
- Epos (2007, No Colours Records / Narcoleptica Productions / Shaytan Productions)
- The Great Silk Road (2008, Paragon Records / Narcoleptica Productions / Shaytan Productions)
- Manas (2013, Osmose Productions / Narcoleptica Productions)
- Turan (2016, Osmose Productions)
- Nomad (2024, Osmose Productions)

=== Live albums ===
- Everything Becomes Fire (2015)

=== Compilation albums ===
- 20th Anniversary Chronicles of Nomadic Conquest (2019, Beverina Productions / Casus Belli Musica)

=== Split albums ===
- Akyr Zaman/Tajer al Punqia split with Al-Namrood (2016, Shaytan Productions)

=== EPs ===
- The Way to Paganism (2005, No Colours Records)
- Khagan (2011, Osmose Productions / Narcoleptica Productions)
- Chong Aryk (2021, Shaytan Productions)

=== Demos ===
- Pagan Black Act (2003, Curse of KvN Sadistic)
- Through the Ashes of the Shamanic Flames (2000, Curse of KvN Sadistic)

== See also ==
- Tengrism
- Kyrgyz music
- Pagan metal
