= Diabolical (album) =

Studio album by Destruction
- Released: 8 April 2022
- Genre: Thrash metal
- Length: 47:16
- Label: Napalm Records
- Producer: Schmier

Destruction chronology
Born to Perish (2019)	Diabolical (2022)	Birth of Malice (2025)

Singles from Diabolical
- 1. "State of Apathy" Released: 10 September 2021; 2. "Diabolical" Released: 5 May 2023

Diabolical is the fifteenth studio album by the German thrash metal band Destruction. It was released on 8 April 2022 through Napalm Records in celebration of the band's 40th anniversary. It is the first album to not have founding rhythm guitarist Mike Sifringer, as he left the band in 2021 after nearly 40 years; he was replaced by Martin Furia.

== Background ==
On 16 July 2021, Destruction performed at the Area 53 Festival in Leoben without rhythm guitarist Mike Sifringer. Schmier explained in a Facebook post that Sifringer had not answered his emails and questioned his status, and that there was a problem that led to the decision to continue without him and would release a statement planned for 19 August. Sifringer's departure was confirmed that day and was replaced by new guitarist Martin Furia, followed by the release of a new single titled "State of Apathy", featuring the band's first recording appearance with Furia. On 16 December, a music video of the title track from the sixteenth studio album Diabolical was released.

== Track listing ==
No.	Title	Length
1.	"Under the Spell"	1:13
2.	"Diabolical"	4:09
3.	"No Faith in Humanity"	4:17
4.	"Repent Your Sins"	4:08
5.	"Hope Dies Last"	3:34
6.	"The Last of a Dying Breed"	4:09
7.	"State of Apathy"	3:46
8.	"Tormented Soul"	4:45
9.	"Servant of the Beast"	3:49
10.	"The Lonely Wolf"	3:54
11.	"Ghost from the Past"	3:04
12.	"Whorefication"	3:59
13.	"City Baby Attacked by Rats" (GBH cover)	2:29
Total length:		47:16

== Personnel ==
=== Destruction ===
- Schmier – bass, lead vocals
- Damir Eskic – lead guitar, backing vocals
- Martin Furia – rhythm guitar, backing vocals
- Randy Black – drums

=== Additional personnel ===
- Gyula Havancsák – artwork, photography, layout, design
- Schmier – production
- Martin Buchwalter – recording (backing vocals)
- V.O. Pulver – recording, mixing, mastering

== Charts ==
Chart (2015)	Peak position
Belgian Albums (Ultratop Wallonia)	180
German Albums (Offizielle Top 100)	12
Swiss Albums (Schweizer Hitparade)	19
