= The Divination of Antiquity =

2014 album by Winterfylleth

Studio album by Winterfylleth
- Released: 6 October 2014
- Genre: Black metal
- Length: 56:36
- Language: English
- Label: Candlelight Records

Winterfylleth chronology
The Threnody of Triumph (2012)	The Divination of Antiquity (2014)	The Dark Hereafter (2016)

The Divination of Antiquity is the fourth studio album by the English black metal band Winterfylleth, released on 6 October 2014 through Candlelight Records.

== Music and lyrics ==
The Divination of Antiquity is the fourth studio album by the English black metal band Winterfylleth. According to the band's singer Chris Naughton, the band members invested more time in writing the songs than they had for the previous albums, creating many versions of the songs and rearranging them multiple times. The album's title is meant as an encouragement to study history and learn from experience in order to not repeat previous mistakes. It ties in with an overall message about cyclical history and an understanding of contemporary times as characterised by monetary rule and exploitation.

== Release ==
Candlelight Records released The Divination of Antiquity on 6 October 2014. The cover art continues Winterfylleth's habit of displaying English landscapes, in this case a photograph by Winterfylleth's drummer Simon Lucas of West Water in the Lake District. According to Naughton, the purpose is to represent "the immense vastness and beauty of England". "Whisper of the Elements" was released as a single with a lyric video on 15 August 2014.

== Reception ==
Herr Møller of Metal.de wrote that The Divination of Antiquity continues Winterfylleth's combination of Nordic black metal with folk elements and a focus on melody, but reaches a higher quality level than previous albums. He called it one of the best melodic black metal albums of the year, wrote that every track is good and that "Whisper of the Elements" stands out as one of the most musically dynamic songs in its genre. Metal Hammer's Dayal Patterson wrote that The Divination of Antiquity largely sounds like Winterfylleth's three previous albums, which are characterised by "hypnotic and atmosphere-rich sound-scapes" adopted from second wave black metal, but stands out through its nods to post-black metal, with an occasionally introspective tone reminiscent of Alcest.

== Track listing ==
No.	Title	Length
1.	"The Divination of Antiquity"	6:27
2.	"Whisper of the Elements"	7:16
3.	"Warrior Herd"	7:35
4.	"A Careworn Heart"	9:38
5.	"Foundations of Ash"	6:21
6.	"The World Ahead"	3:25
7.	"Over Borderlands"	7:26
8.	"Forsaken in Stone"	8:24
Total length:		56:36
