= Born to Perish =

Studio album by Destruction
- Released: 9 August 2019
- Genre: Thrash metal
- Length: 46:40
- Label: Nuclear Blast
- Producers: Destruction and VO Pulver

Destruction chronology
Thrash Anthems II (2017)	Born to Perish (2019)	Diabolical (2022)

Singles from Born to Perish
- 1. "Born to Perish" Released: 31 March 2019; 2. "Betrayal" Released: 19 July 2019

Born to Perish is the fourteenth studio album by the German thrash metal band Destruction. It was released on 9 August 2019 through Nuclear Blast. The album marks the band’s first time since 1999 that they recorded it as a four-piece band instead of three. It is also the last album to have founding member Mike Sifringer and the first to feature guitarist Damir Eskić and drummer Randy Black.

== Background ==
On 23 January 2018, Vaaver left Destruction "for family reasons", according to Schmier. He took time off in 2015 to be with his family following the birth of his second child. Randy Black would temporarily replace him until the band finds a "worthy successor". He was later announced as the band's new drummer. On 28 February 2019, Swiss guitarist Damir Eskić joined the band. This would become the new line-up for the fifteenth studio album Born to Perish.

In May 2019, when the album cover was revealed, Schmier spoke to the French channel Duke TV about the work on the upcoming Destruction album: "It's a process that took us three months - writing, recording and mixing. The new influence of the guys is felt, because there are more shred solos on the album. Randy is a very solid, very tight player - and very groove-y. You can hear it. This time around, we tried to make songs that hit the mark faster – the songs just hit you straight away. It’s brutal, but it’s very catchy. So when you hear the songs for the first time, you remember them straight away. Nobody writes an album like that every time. Sometimes you write songs and after a while you’re like, ‘Maybe this is too hard,’ because you want to be an artist, you want to express yourself. I think we’ve managed to write a really punchy album this time around."

== Reception ==
Jay H. Gorania of Blabbermouth.net gave the album a 7 out of 10 and concluded, "As we all suspected, Destruction weren’t out to reinvent the thrash metal wheel. With Born To Perish, they’re just riding that wheel into hell, and it’s amazing."

== Track listing ==
No.	Title	Length
1.	"Born To Perish"	5:20
2.	"Inspired By Death"	4:16
3.	"Betrayal"	4:05
4.	"Rotten"	4:49
5.	"Filthy Wealth"	4:01
6.	"Butchered For Life"	6:43
7.	"Tyrants Of The Netherworld"	3:41
8.	"We Breed Evil"	5:16
9.	"Fatal Flight 17"	4:27
10.	"Ratcatcher"	4:02
Total length:		46:40

Bonus track of the digipak edition
No.	Title	Length
11.	"Hellbound" (Tygers of Pan Tang cover)	3:38
Total length:		50:18

Bonus track of the Japanese edition
No.	Title	Length
11.	"Fire Down Under" (Riot cover)	2:49
Total length:		49:29

== Personnel ==
=== Destruction ===
- Schmier – bass, lead vocals
- Damir Eskic – lead guitar, backing vocals
- Mike Sifringer – rhythm guitar
- Randy Black – drums
