= The Ghost of Heritage =

2008 album by Winterfylleth

Studio album by Winterfylleth
- Released: 14 October 2008
- Genre: Black metal
- Length: 48:59
- Language: English
- Label: Profound Lore Records

Winterfylleth chronology
The Ghost of Heritage (2008)	The Mercian Sphere (2010)

The Ghost of Heritage is the first studio album by the English black metal band Winterfylleth, released on 14 October 2008 through Profound Lore Records.

== Background ==
The black metal band Winterfylleth was formed in Manchester by the drummer Simon Lucas and vocalist and guitarist Chris Naughton, who were old friends and had played together in the band Atavist. Winterfylleth released its first demo in 2007, got some attention in the metal underground scene and got a studio album deal with the Canadian label Profound Lore Records. For the recording, they were joined by Richard Brass of the band Wodensthrone.

== Release ==
Profound Lore Records released The Ghost of Heritage on 14 October 2008. The cover art features the Norman Peveril Castle in the Peak District, shown in saturated colours. The album's name is written in Anglo-Saxon runes. The booklet dedicates the album to "all those who throughout the ages have been actively involved in the preservation of our proud ancestral heritage, rich national culture, folklore, and tradition".

== Reception ==
Blabbermouth.net wrote that The Ghost of Heritage consists of "a relatively unique brand of folk-laced, expansive, and semi-progressive (i.e., not cluttered) black metal that takes multiple listens to fully appreciate", with "a classy and intelligent style of composition that comes off as weighty as the topics covered". According to the sociologist Karl Spacklen, the music style is derived from the bands Drudkh and Hate Forest, with some influences from English folk music, and the lyrics are "fully in the heroic nationalist, hegemonically masculine mode".

Upon the release, The Ghost of Heritage won Winterfylleth a reputation as a controversial band, due to the album's focus on heritage and how some of the lyrics were interpreted. This was fuelled by politically right-wing posts online by a then member, who was subsequently removed from the band. This reputation led to some cancelled shows and censorship in music media, as well as violent threats from antifascist groups. The reputation and controversy raised the band's profile, gave it an image of being extreme—which often is considered positive within its genre—and increased sales. The attention and commercial success led to a record deal with a larger record company, Candlelight Records.

== Track listing ==
No.	Title	Length
1.	"Mam Tor (The Shivering Mountain)"	06:14
2.	"The March to Maldon"	03:47
3.	"Brithnoth: The Battle of Maldon (991 AD)"	07:39
4.	"Forging the Iron of England"	05:13
5.	"The Ghost of Heritage"	05:27
6.	"Defending the Realm"	05:22
7.	"Guardian of the Herd"	04:49
8.	"Casting the Runes"	05:24
9.	"An Englishman’s Verse"	05:04
Total length:		48:59
