= Written in Blood (Darkness Divided album) =

Studio album by Darkness Divided
- Released: August 19, 2014
- Recorded: 2014
- Genre: Metalcore
- Length: 34:33
- Label: Victory Records
- Producer: Cory Brunnemann

Darkness Divided chronology
| Written in Blood (2014) | Darkness Divided (2016) |

Singles from Written In Blood
- 1. "A Well Run Dry" Released: July 15, 2014; 2. "The Hands That Bled" Released: August 11, 2014

Professional ratings
Review scores
| Source | Rating |
|---|---|
| Alternative Press | 3/5 stars |
| Christian Review | 5/5 stars |
| Jesusfreakhideout | 3.5/5 stars |
| Hit The Floor | 4/5 stars |

Written in Blood is the debut album by Darkness Divided, released on August 19, 2014, through Victory Records. The album contains 11 tracks, three of which are instrumental.

== Track listing ==
| No. | Title | Writer(s) | Length |
|---|---|---|---|
| 1. | "Severance" | Cory Brunnemann | 0:58 |
| 2. | "The Shepherd's Hands" | Sebastian Elizondo, Israel Hernandez, Christopher Mora, Gerard Mora, Joseph Mora | 3:43 |
| 3. | "A Well Run Dry" | Sebastian Elizondo, Israel Hernandez, Christopher Mora, Gerard Mora, Joseph Mora | 3:55 |
| 4. | "The Hands That Bled" | Sebastian Elizondo, Israel Hernandez, Christopher Mora, Gerard Mora, Joseph Mora | 4:05 |
| 5. | "The Descent" | Cory Brunnemann | 1:36 |
| 6. | "Eternal Thirst" | Sebastian Elizondo, Israel Hernandez, Christopher Mora, Gerard Mora, Joseph Mora | 3:27 |
| 7. | "Withering Kingdom" | Cory Brunnemann, Christopher Mora, Gerard Mora | 3:29 |
| 8. | "Remnants" | Sebastian Elizondo, Israel Hernandez, Christopher Mora, Gerard Mora, Joseph Mora | 3:23 |
| 9. | "The Will of Man" | Sebastian Elizondo, Israel Hernandez, Christopher Mora, Gerard Mora, Joseph Mora | 3:11 |
| 10. | "Interlude" | Cory Brunnemann |
| 11. | "Divine Mercy" | Sebastian Elizondo, Israel Hernandez, Christopher Mora, Gerard Mora, Joseph Mora | 4:39 |
| Total length: | | | 34:33 |

== Personnel ==
Darkness Divided

- Gerard Mora – lead unclean vocals
- Christopher Mora – lead guitar, backing unclean vocals
- Sebastian Elizondo – rhythm guitar, clean vocals
- Joseph Mora – bass guitar
- Israel Hernandez – drums
- Cory Brunnenman – additional unclean vocals, additional song arrangement, guitar, and bass writing performance

Production

- Cory Brunnemann – producer, mixer, engineer
- Alan Douches – master
- Ali-Lander Shindler – art direction
- Sam Kaufman – artwork
