= The Dark Hereafter =

2016 album by Winterfylleth

Studio album by Winterfylleth
- Released: 30 September 2016
- Genre: Black metal
- Length: 40:51
- Language: English
- Label: Candlelight Records

Winterfylleth chronology
The Divination of Antiquity (2014)	The Dark Hereafter (2016)	The Hallowing of Heirdom (2018)

The Dark Hereafter is the fifth studio album by the English black metal band Winterfylleth, released on 30 September 2016 through Candlelight Records.

== Music and lyrics ==
The Dark Hereafter is the fifth studio album by the English black metal band Winterfylleth. It consists of five tracks of which three are new. "Pariah's Path" had been a bonus track in the digipak version of the band's previous album, The Divination of Antiquity. "Led Astray in the Forest Dark" is a cover and English translation of Ulver's song "I troldskog faren vild" from the 1995 album Bergtatt – Et eeventyr i 5 capitler.

It was a deliberate choice to have fewer but longer songs than on previous albums, allowing Winterfylleth to write songs with more layers and build-up over time. The tracks are less influenced by folk music than usual for Winterfylleth, although this was not a conscious choice. It was Winterfylleth's first album with the guitarist Dan Capp who replaced Mark Wood.

== Release ==
Candlelight Records released The Dark Hereafter on 30 September 2016. The cover art, designed by Capp, features a photograph taken by Winterfylleth's drummer Simon Lucas, depicting a misty mountain area. The band chose a darker image than usual to reflect brooding messages and subtexts in the songs.

== Reception ==
In The Quietus, Pavel Godfrey wrote that The Dark Hereafter, with its low number of tracks, is reminiscent of an extended EP, which may be the result of a hectic and prolific period for Winterfylleth. He described the track "The Dark Hereafter" as a distillation of the strongest parts of the earlier albums The Threnody of Triumph and The Divination of Antiquity. Godfrey wrote that the Ulver cover is played "too straight" to change how the song is perceived, but Winterfylleth's choice to associate itself with Ulver changed how he viewed the band and its influences. According to Joe DiVita of Loudwire, the album contains "'gotcha!' moments", such as when he thought the title track was about to move into shoegaze, but surprised him with "a monstrous pick scrape followed by another round of blasts".

David Oberlin wrote in Soundscape that the longest tracks, "Pariah's Path" and "Green Cathedral", create a trance-like effect. He wrote that the Ulver cover was a disappointment, but that the new songs "are killer and have an airier tone". Jan Wischkowski of Metal.de wrote that the first three tracks would have been enough to make The Dark Hereafter a good album, but the main stand-out track is the fourth, "Green Cathedral", which he described as an "incredibly intense listening experience" due to its "leisurely tempo, great leads and highly emotional vocals".

== Track listing ==
No.	Title	Length
1.	"The Dark Hereafter"	4:11
2.	"Pariah's Path"	9:02
3.	"Ensigns of Victory"	6:52
4.	"Green Cathedral"	13:08
5.	"Led Astray in the Forest Dark"	7:37
Total length:		40:51
