= Gold (Whores album) =

Gold.

Studio album by Whores.
- Released: 28 October 2016
- Studio: Parhelion Recording Studios (Atlanta, Georgia)
- Genre: Noise rock, sludge metal
- Length: 35:25
- Label: eOne
- Producer: Ryan Beosch, Christian Lembach

Whores. chronology
Clean (2013)	Gold. (2016)	War. (2024)

Gold. is the debut full-length album from Atlanta-based noise rock/sludge metal band Whores. The album was released on October 28, 2016, by the record label eOne. The album was named the #10 best metal album of 2016 by Rolling Stone and as the best metal album of 2016 by Kelsey Chapstick of MetalSucks.

== Track listing ==
No.	Title	Length
1.	"Playing Poor"	3:04
2.	"Baby Teeth"	3:28
3.	"Participation Trophy"	4:11
4.	"Mental Illness as Mating Ritual"	3:04
5.	"Ghost Trash"	2:53
6.	"Charlie Chaplin Routine"	2:13
7.	"Of Course You Do"	3:43
8.	"I See You Are Also Wearing a Black T-Shirt"	2:35
9.	"Bloody Like the Day You Were Born"	3:59
10.	"I Have a Prepared Statement"	6:15

== Personnel ==
Whores

- Christian Lembach - guitar, vocals
- Casey Maxwell - bass
- Donnie Adkinson - drums

Production

- Ryan Boesch - production, recording, mastering
- Christian Lembach - production
- John Horeseco - mastering
- Patrick Copeland - artwork
