= Birth of Malice =

Studio album by Destruction
- Released: 7 March 2025
- Genre: Thrash metal
- Length: 50:33
- Label: Napalm
- Producers: Schmier; Martin Furia; V.O. Pulver

Destruction chronology
| Diabolical (2022) | Birth of Malice (2025) |

Singles from Birth of Malice
- 1. "No Kings – No Masters" Released: 6 June 2024; 2. "Fast as a Shark" Released: 10 July 2024; 3. "Destruction" Released: 14 November 2024; 4. "A.N.G.S.T." Released: 23 January 2025; 5. "Scumbag Human Race" Released: 20 February 2025

Birth of Malice is the sixteenth studio album by the German thrash metal band Destruction. It was released on 7 March 2025 through Napalm Records.

== Background and promotion ==
On 23 January 2024, Destruction announced that they were working of their sixteenth studio album. On 6 June, the band the album's first single, titled "No Kings - No Masters". On 10 July, they released the second single, a cover song of Accept's "Fast as a Shark", which is also included in the 12" single of "No Kings - No Masters" released on the same day. On 12 November, Destruction announced the name of their sixteenth studio album Birth of Malice, and two days later, they released the third single "Destruction", their namesake song. On 23 January 2025, the band released the fourth single "A.N.G.S.T." On 20 February, they released the fifth and final single "Scumbag Human Race".

== Critical reception ==
Professional ratings
Review scores
| Source | Rating |
|---|---|
| Blabbermouth.net | 6.5/10 |
| Brave Words & Bloody Knuckles | 8/10 |
| Distorted Sound | 7/10 |

The album received generally positive reviews from critics. Jay H. Gorania from Blabbermouth.net gave the album 6.5 out of 10, stating that the album won't find regular rotation amongst thrash metal fans but it won't disappoint them either. James Weaver of Distorted Sound scored the album 7 out of 10 and called the album "a fine edition to the band's arsenal" and "a no holds barred thrash romp from one of the scene’s most loyal servants."

== Track listing ==
All lyrics are written by Marcel Schmier, except where noted; all music is composed by Marcel Schmier, except where noted.

| No. | Title | Lyrics | Music | Length |
|---|---|---|---|---|
| 1. | "Birth of Malice" | | | 1:00 |
| 2. | "Destruction" | | | 5:22 |
| 3. | "Cyber Warfare" | | Schmier, Martin Furia | 4:24 |
| 4. | "No Kings – No Masters" | | | 4:10 |
| 5. | "Scumbag Human Race" | | Schmier, Martin Furia | 4:16 |
| 6. | "God of Gore" | | Schmier, Martin Furia | 4:10 |
| 7. | "A.N.G.S.T." | | | 5:09 |
| 8. | "Dealer of Death" | | | 4:55 |
| 9. | "Evil Never Sleeps" | | | 4:28 |
| 10. | "Chains of Sorrow" | | | 4:12 |
| 11. | "Greed" | | | 4:59 |
| 12. | "Fast as a Shark" (Accept cover) | Wolf Hoffmann, Stefan Kaufmann, Udo Dirkschneider, Peter Baltes | Hoffmann, Kaufmann, Dirkschneider, Baltes | 2:58 |
| Total length: | | | | 50:33 |

== Personnel ==
=== Destruction ===
- Schmier – bass, lead vocals
- Damir Eskic – lead guitar, backing vocals
- Martin Furia – rhythm guitar, backing vocals
- Randy Black – drums

=== Additional personnel ===
- Schmier – production
- Martin Furia – production, recording (drums, percussion), mixing, mastering
- Randy Black – recording (drums, percussion)
- V.O. Pulver – production, recording
- Gyula Havancsák – artwork
- Jennifer Gruber – photography

== Charts ==
Chart performance for Birth of Malice
| Chart (2025) | Peak position |
|---|---|
| Austrian Albums (Ö3 Austria) | 12 |
| Belgian Albums (Ultratop Flanders) | 144 |
| German Albums (Offizielle Top 100) | 9 |
| Swiss Albums (Schweizer Hitparade) | 23 |
| UK Independent Albums (Official Charts) | 39 |
| UK Rock & Metal Albums (Official Charts) | 18 |
