= Classical (album) =

Studio album by Wolf Hoffmann
- Released: September 22, 1997
- Genres: Rock; Neoclassical metal
- Length: 48:40
- Label: Sony BMG
- Producer: Michael Wagener

Wolf Hoffmann chronology
Classical (1997)	Headbangers Symphony (2016)

Professional ratings
Review scores
Source	Rating
roughedge.com link	(3.5/4)

Classical is an album by the guitarist Wolf Hoffmann. It begins with a rendition from Georges Bizet's Carmen, Suite #1 playing the famous Fate Theme from Carmen's opera. Next is a version of Edvard Grieg's "In the Hall of the Mountain King." Track #4 is "Arabian Dance" by Peter I. Tchaikovsky. Ravel's "Bolero" becomes a bluesy piece. The CD's final track is a version of Edward Elgar's "Pomp & Circumstance".

== Track listing ==
1. Prelude – 1:25
2. In the Hall of the Mountain King – 3:14
3. Habanera – 5:14
4. Arabian Dance – 5:14
5. The Moldau – 4:54
6. Bolero – 8:17
7. Blues for Elise – 4:02
8. Aragonaise – 4:27
9. Solveig's Song – 3:45
10. Western Sky – 4:26
11. Pomp & Circumstance – 3:42

== Band ==
- Wolf Hoffmann - guitars
- Peter Baltes - bass on #11
- Mike Brignardello - bass on #02, 03, 05, 07 & 09
- W. Anthony Joyner - bass on #10
- Michael Cartellone - drums & percussion
- Larry Hall - piano on #11
- Dr. Al Kooper - Hammond B3 organ on #07
