= The Threnody of Triumph =

Studio album by Winterfylleth
- Released: 25 September 2012
- Studio: Foel Studios
- Genre: Black metal
- Length: 63:30
- Language: English
- Label: Candlelight Records
- Producer: Chris Fielding

Winterfylleth chronology
The Mercian Sphere (2010)	The Threnody of Triumph (2012)	The Divination of Antiquity (2014)

The Threnody of Triumph is the third studio album by the English black metal band Winterfylleth, released on 25 September 2012 through Candlelight Records.

== Background and recording ==
The English black metal band Winterfylleth formed in Manchester in 2006 and released two albums—The Ghost of Heritage (2008) and The Mercian Sphere (2010)—before The Threnody of Triumph. The Threnody of Triumph was recorded at Foel Studios and produced by Chris Fielding.

== Music and lyrics ==
A threnody is an ode about someone who has died, and Chris Naughton of Winterfylleth describes The Threnody of Triumph as an album about celebrating the lives of deceased loved ones. The aim was to combine a sense loss and celebration, which the band tried to do by contrasting the darkness of fast-played black metal with soaring lead singing and vocal harmonies. According to Naughton, the album has a spiritual theme related to "how our ancestors viewed spirituality in the sense of how the soul and the body were connected", and was made with an ambition to engage listeners socially by evoking history.

== Release ==
The track "Void of Light" debuted on BBC Radio 1's Rock Show. Candlelight Records released The Threnody of Triumph on 25 September 2012. The cover art is a photograph from the Snowdonia National Park.

== Reception ==
Metal.de's Christoph wrote that Winterfylleth combines dense atmosphere and the speed and roughness of 1990s Norwegian black metal with clean vocals and influences from folk music, which is not innovative but has established the band as a major act within its genre. He wrote that The Threnody of Triumph differs from the two previous albums by being more "thoughtful and settled, less furious and warlike". Toby Cook of Metal Hammer said Winterfylleth's sound has not changed much between albums and is close to the early works of Enslaved. In his review for AllMusic, Eduardo Rivadavia said the added influences from classical music make The Threnody of Triumph sound similar to Windir's music. In 2020, Kerrang! named it the twelfth greatest black metal album of the 21st century, writing that there is "a vastness to The Threnody Of Triumph that's less combative and misanthropic than black metal can often seem".

== Track listing ==
All tracks are written by Simon Lucas and Chris Naughton.

No.	Title	Length
1.	"A Thousand Winters"	07:36
2.	"The Swart Raven"	07:48
3.	"Æfterield-Fréon"	01:54
4.	"A Memorial"	06:51
5.	"The Glorious Plain"	06:25
6.	"A Soul Unbound"	08:16
7.	"Void of Light"	05:23
8.	"The Fate of Souls After Death"	07:15
9.	"Home Is Behind"	03:12
10.	"The Threnody of Triumph"	08:50
Total length:		63:30
