= The Mercian Sphere =

Studio album by Winterfylleth
- Released: 12 July 2010
- Studio: Foel Studios
- Genre: Black metal
- Length: 68:25
- Language: English
- Label: Candlelight Records
- Producer: Chris Fielding

Winterfylleth chronology
The Ghost of Heritage (2008)	The Mercian Sphere (2010)	The Threnody of Triumph (2012)

The Mercian Sphere is the second studio album by the English black metal band Winterfylleth, released on 12 July 2010 through Candlelight Records. It was made after Winterfylleth regrouped in 2009 and was the band's first collaboration with Candlelight Records. It contains Anglo-Saxon lyrical subjects and influences from folk music.

== Background ==
The black metal band Winterfylleth formed in Manchester in 2007 by the drummer Simon Lucas and vocalist and guitarist Chris Naughton. The band released its debut album The Ghost of Heritage through Profound Lore Records in 2008. Between the first and second album, the band replaced its bass guitarist, who attracted attention from antifascists for posts on his Myspace page where he used the phrases "wpww"—short for "White Pride World Wide"—and "14w"—referring to the Fourteen Words slogan of the American neo-Nazi David Lane. This prompted a festival in Manchester to cancel a Winterfylleth performance and the band to change its line-up. Regrouped in 2009, the band consisted of Naughton on guitar and vocals, Lucas on drums, Nick Wallwork on bass and Mark Wood on guitar.

== Music and recording ==
Winterfylleth signed with the bigger label Candlelight Records to release its second album The Mercian Sphere. The Mercian Sphere was the first Winterfylleth album to feature Caroline Lucas on violin, on the instrumental track "Children of the Stones". The album features a trilogy of songs called "The Wayfarer", which were inspired by the Old English poem "The Wanderer", preserved in the 10th-century Exeter Book. The album was recorded at Foel Studios and produced by Chris Fielding.

== Release ==
Candlelight Records released The Mercian Sphere on 12 July 2010. The liner notes say the album is "dedicated to all those who are actively involved with the preservation of our great ancestral heritage, history, folklore and rich national culture". Winterfylleth was featured on the cover of the music magazine Zero Tolerance in conjunction with the release. In 2020, Candlelight Records released a tenth-anniversary edition with new cover art and a booklet with extended liner notes. Winterfylleth released a lyric video for the song "A Valley Thick with Oaks" for this occasion.

== Reception ==
Comparing The Mercian Sphere to The Ghost of Heritage, the scholar Karl Spracklen says it is "more ambiguous in its lyrics about race and nation, though it is still mainly about Anglo-Saxon men fighting for England". Alex Henderson of AllMusic says the album succeeds in combining melody and harmony with the aggression expected from the black metal genre. He says it incorporates elements of European folk music without becoming folk metal, although is likely to be dismissed by "black metal purists", who consider melodic black metal to be watered down rather than nuanced. Metal.de's Yannick says Winterfylleth stands out within its genre due to its less martial and more serious image, reflected in a musical seriousness on The Mercian Sphere, and highlights the passages inspired by folk music, which provide atmosphere to the songs.

== Track listing ==
Adapted from The Mercian Sphere's Bandcamp page.

No.	Title	Length
1.	"Gateway to the Dark Peak / The Solitary One Waits for Grace (The Wayfarer Pt I)"	07:05
2.	"Awakens He, Bereft of Kinsmen (The Wayfarer Pt II)"	07:25
3.	"The Fields of Reckoning"	05:33
4.	"Children of the Stones"	04:45
5.	"The Ruin"	06:52
6.	"The Honour of Good Men on the Path to Eternal Glory"	10:17
7.	"To Find Solace... Where Security Stands (The Wayfarer Pt III)"	10:11
8.	"When the Woods Were Young"	02:24
9.	"A Valley Thick with Oaks"	07:22
10.	"Defending the Realm"	06:31
Total length:		68:25

== See also ==
- 2010 in heavy metal music
- Mercia
