= Winterfylleth (band) =

English black metal band

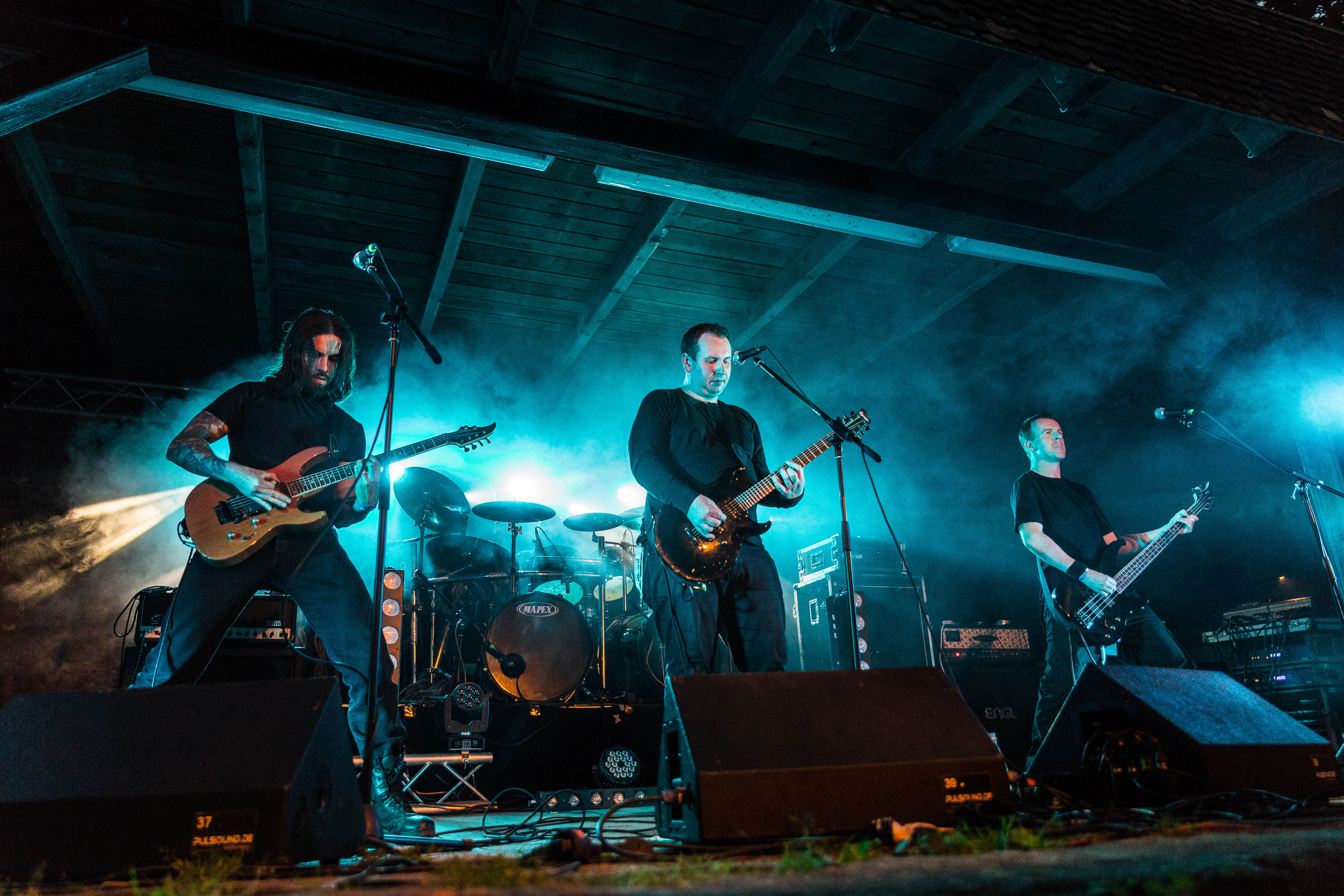
- Winterfylleth live at Dark Troll Open Air 2019

Background information
- Origin: Manchester, England
- Genres: Black metal
- Years active: 2006–present
- Labels: Candlelight, Profound Lore, Napalm
- Members: Chris Naughton; Simon Lucas; Mark Deeks; Russell Dobson; Mark Doyle
- Past members: Richard Brass; Mark Wood; Dan Capp; Nick Wallwork
- Website: winterfylleth.bandcamp.com

Winterfylleth is an English black metal band from Manchester. Since their inception in 2006, the band has released nine studio albums and have become a popular act in both the English underground metal scene and the wider international metal arena. Winterfylleth are self-described as "English Heritage Black Metal" and are often considered to be musical 'brothers-in-arms' with fellow English black metal band Wodensthrone owing to the common lyrical and aesthetic themes they share. The band takes its name from the Old English word 'Winterfylleth', which translates into modern English as 'Winter Full Moon' and is signified by the arrival of the first full moon of winter.

== History ==
Formed in 2006, and releasing a demo (Rising of the Winter Full Moon) in 2007, Winterfylleth rapidly gained attention in the metal underground, earning them a record deal with Profound Lore Records on which they released their debut 2008 album The Ghost of Heritage. The release was critically well received and garnered the band considerable attention within the English black metal scene. Following this release, Richard Brass (also a member of Wodensthrone) departed the band and Chris Naughton and Simon Lucas were joined by Nick Wallwork and Mark Wood, completing the line-up that would remain until 2015. In early 2008, during the period before Nick & Mark's joining, (and as the pre-curser to it) a social media post containing some 'misguided thoughts & opinions' was discovered on the live bass player's MySpace page. This post led to the band being removed from the lineup of a small festival in Manchester around the same period, and resulted in the bassist's departure from the band. The band later addressed - in detail - the impacts and fallout of this early controversy within Dayal Patterson's book Black Metal: Evolution of the Cult - The Restored, Expanded & Definitive Edition.

Winterfylleth then set to work on their second album, The Mercian Sphere, which was released on Candlelight Records in 2010. Again, the release was a critical success (Terrorizer magazine album of the month and twentieth best album of 2010) and propelled the band to international success. This new found recognition landed the band high-profile appearances at a number of top metal festivals including Wacken Open Air, Hellfest, Graspop and Bloodstock Open Air. Winterfylleth released their third album in 2012, The Threnody of Triumph, once again to widespread critical acclaim: this release again obtaining Terrorizer magazine's album of the month and 15th best album of 2012. It also was ranked as the 12th best album of 2012 by Kerrang! and made the top ten lists of many Kerrang! contributors that year as well.

In March and April 2013, Winterfylleth toured with and supported Enslaved in seventeen shows out of their eighteen show Spring Rite European tour. Later in the year the band returned to Graspop Metal Meeting for the second year running and soon after made their Summer Breeze Open Air debut. The first half of 2014 saw two releases from Winterfylleth. The first, released in January, was a split EP on vinyl with Ukrainian black metal band Drudkh entitled Thousands of Moons Ago / The Gates which featured covers of bands that have influenced Winterfylleth and Drudkh. The second, released in May, was a compilation album in which Winterfylleth participated entitled One And All, Together, For Home, featuring folk songs recorded by various metal bands including Primordial, Kampfar and, once again, Drudkh. In July 2014 Winterfylleth announced that they planned to release their fourth album, The Divination of Antiquity, in October 2014.

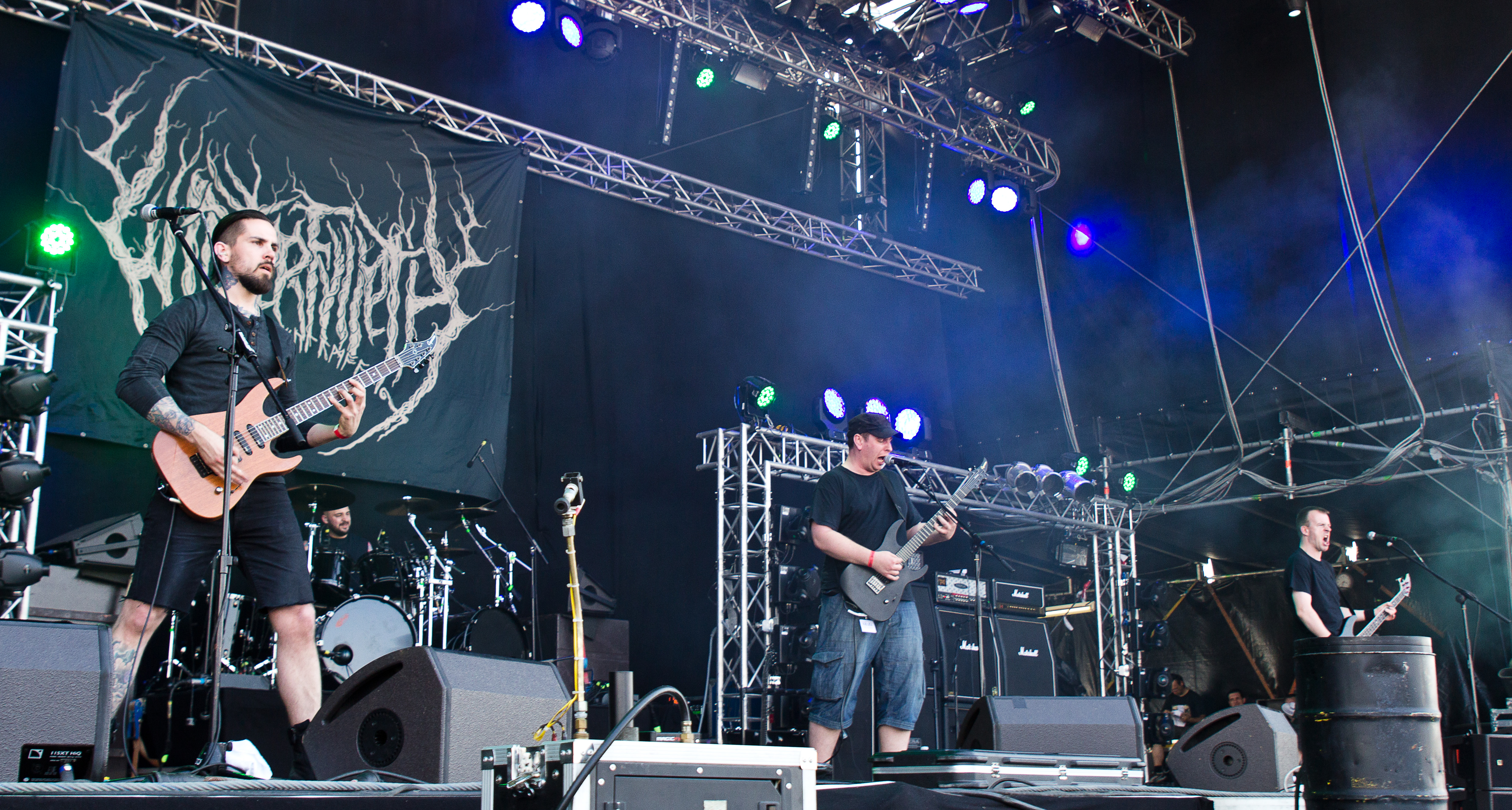
Winterfylleth performing in 2015.

In 2015, they received the award for "best underground band" at the Metal Hammer Golden Gods Awards. On 2 August 2016 the band announced the album cover and title of their fifth album, The Dark Hereafter. On 4 August, they confirmed the release date as 30 September. They released the track 'Ensigns of Victory' in advance of the album's release. The band released their sixth album titled The Hallowing of Heirdom on 6 April 2018. The band released their seventh album, The Reckoning Dawn, on 8 May 2020. Metal Hammer named it as the 28th best metal album of 2020. Metal Hammer Germany voted the album as the #1 Black Metal album of 2020.

In late 2020, Russell Dobson replaced Dan Capp on lead guitar. Followings Russell’s integration into the fold, the band returned in August 2021 to play at the UK's Bloodstock Festival, at Catton Park in Derbyshire.. In October 2021 the band undertook a week-long run of shows in the UK alongside Ireland’s Dread Sovereign, on their jointly branded Reckoning Warfare Tour. Bringing material from the bands' The Reckoning Dawn album (and Dread Sovereign's ‘Alchemical Warfare’ album) live to audiences in the UK for the first time, since their respective 2020 releases.

In September 2022, the band performed at Prophecy Productions' legendary Prophecy Fest at Balve Cave in Germany. In October 2022, the band undertook one of its largest tours to date, performing as special guests on a month long European tour with Gaahl's Wyrd and Gaerea.

After a period of writing and recording during 2023, Winterfylleth emerged in early 2024 with a run of performances supporting legendary Black Metal band, Emperor at select shows within the UK and Ireland. The band quickly followed these shows with appearances at the European festivals Ragnarök and Inferno Festival in Norway.

The band's history and influence on the Black Metal scene are described in Dayal Patterson's book Black Metal: Evolution of the Cult, which was released in 2024. The heavy metal news and review website MetalTalk described the book as "the most acclaimed book on the History of Black Metal".

Following their early to mid 2024 touring commitments and after a four year break from releasing new material, the band returned in June 2024 with lead single "Dishonour Enthroned", as an advanced track for their album The Imperious Horizon. Two subsequent advanced singles were also released. "Upon This Shore" in July 2024. Followed by "To The Edge of Tyranny" in August 2024. The band released its eighth album, The Imperious Horizon, on 13 September 2024 via Candlelight Records. The album was released to critical acclaim from the press and was named by Metal Hammer Magazine as its "42nd Best Metal Album of 2024".

The band ended their 2024 touring commitments with a week-long run of shows in the UK during November 2024 in promotion of the album, with support from Wormwitch and Bizarrekvlt.

It was announced on 23 April 2025 that long term bassist, Nick Wallwork would be stepping down from the band after sixteen years of service. With Nick's vacant role being filled by Mark Doyle, an existing member of a related project, Arð.

On 28 January 2026, Winterfylleth announced a new single, "Heroes of a Hundred Fields" as a pre-release track to their forthcoming ninth album, The Unyielding Season. The album announcement also coincided with the band confirming their signing to Napalm Records for its release. Signifying a parting of ways with long-term record label, Candlelight Records.. On 26 February 2026, the band released a second single from the album, entitled "Echoes in the After". The song was written as a reaction to the felling of the Sycamore Gap tree on Hadrian's Wall, in Northern England. With the lyric being written like a 'lament from nature to itself, condemning the demise of such an iconic symbol'. The band also noted that the tree held a special meaning for them, and was the inspiration of the cover for the band's 2018 album, The Hallowing of Heirdom. The Unyielding Season was released on 27 March 2026 via Napalm Records.

== Band members ==
=== Current ===
- Chris Naughton – guitars, lead vocals (2006–present)
- Simon Lucas – drums (2006–present)
- Mark Deeks – keyboards, backing vocals (2014–present)
- Russell Dobson – guitars, backing vocals (2020–present)
- Mark Doyle – bass, backing vocals (2025–present)

=== Former ===
- Richard Brass – guitars, backing vocals (2008–2009)
- Mark Wood – guitars, backing vocals (2009–2014)
- Dan Capp – guitars, backing vocals (2014–2020)
- Nick Wallwork – bass, backing vocals (2009–2025)

== Discography ==
=== Studio albums ===
- The Ghost of Heritage (2008)
- The Mercian Sphere (2010)
- The Threnody of Triumph (2012)
- The Divination of Antiquity (2014)
- The Dark Hereafter (2016)
- The Hallowing of Heirdom (2018)
- The Reckoning Dawn (2020)
- The Imperious Horizon (2024)
- The Unyielding Season (2026)

=== Live albums ===
- The Siege of Mercia; Live at Bloodstock 2017 (2019)
- Live at Bloodstock 2021; Live at Bloodstock Festival 2021 (2021)

=== Splits ===
- Thousands of Moons Ago / The Gates (2014, with Drudkh)

=== 7" singles ===
- Latch to a Grave (2018)

=== Compilations ===
- One and All, Together, for Home (2014)
