= Nomad (Darkestrah album) =

Studio album by Darkestrah
- Released: 29 March 2024
- Genre: Black metal / Folk metal
- Label: Osmose Productions

Nomad is the seventh studio album by the Kyrgyz pagan/folk metal band Darkestrah, released on 29 March 2024 through Osmose Productions. The record continues the band's blend of black metal with Central Asian melodic elements, traditional instruments and vocal techniques such as throat singing, themes of shamanism and references to regional epic poetry.

== Recording and release ==
Reviews describe Nomad as continuing the band's "epic" and "shamanic" approach: dense, long-form compositions that interweave tremolo riffing and blast beats with melodic passages, synth textures and acoustic timbres drawn from Central Asian music. Several reviewers highlight the use of traditional instruments (notably jaw-harp / Jew's harp and various stringed folk instruments) and an emphasis on vocal variety, including clean singing and throat singing.

Nomad was released on 29 March 2024 on CD, vinyl, cassette and digital formats through Osmose Productions. Pre-release coverage and streaming mentions appeared in weekly new-release roundups in metal outlets and the label published the official release information and tracklist.

== Reception ==
Critical reaction in the metal press was broadly positive, with multiple reviewers praising the album's atmospheric scope, incorporation of Central Asian folk elements and the renewed focus on long, epic song structures. Metal-Rules and other reviewers singled out the interplay between traditional instrumentation and black metal elements as a strength, while some outlets noted that the album's dense arrangements reward repeated listens rather than immediate accessibility.

== Track listing ==
1. "Journey Through Blue Nothingness" – 2:12
2. "Kök-Oy" – 8:00
3. "Nomad" – 9:29
4. "Destroyer of Obstacles" – 9:28
5. "Quest for the Soul" – 9:42
6. "The Dream of Kojojash" – 4:51
7. "A Dream that Omens Death" – 1:45

== Personnel ==
- Asbath – drums, percussion, temir komuz, programming, samples.
- Resurgemus – guitars, keyboards.
- Cerritus – bass, shaman drum, temir komuz.
- Magus / Mangus – tanbur, divan, cuatro, Azeri tar (traditional instruments).
- Charuk (Çaruk Revan) – vocals, percussion.
