= Whores (band) =

American noise rock band

Whores.
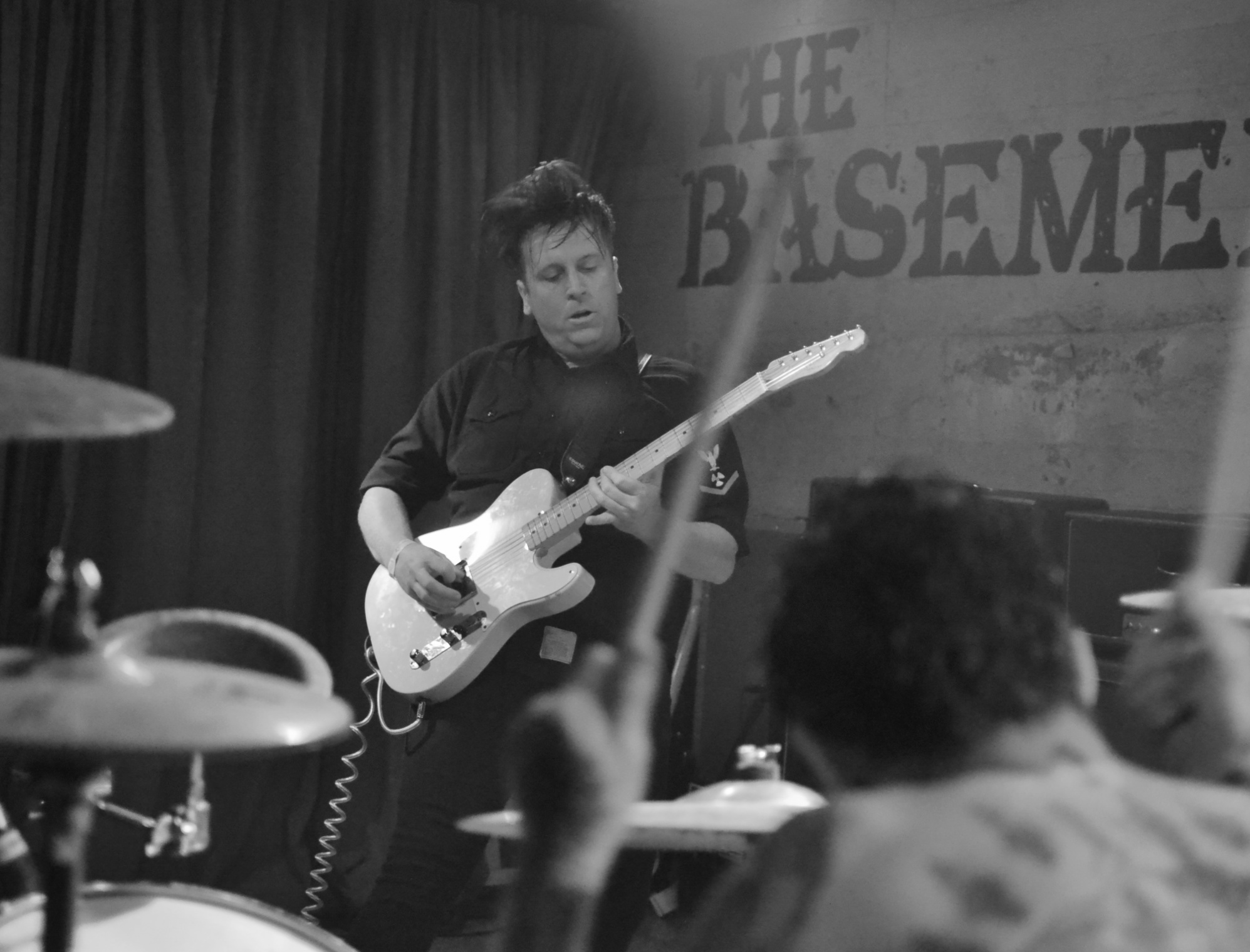
- Lembach performing with Whores in 2012

Background information
- Origin: Atlanta, Georgia, U.S.
- Genres: Noise rock; sludge metal
- Years active: 2010–present
- Labels: eOne, Amphetamine Reptile, Brutal Panda, Eolian
- Members: Christian Lembach; Donnie Adkinson; Douglas Jennings Barrett
- Past members: Steven Higginbottom; Travis Owen; Jake Schultz; Casey Maxwell; Joel Willis
- Website: whoresband.com

Whores (stylized as WHORES.) is an American noise rock/sludge metal band based in Atlanta, Georgia. It currently consists of vocalist and guitarist Christian Lembach, bass guitarist Douglas Jennings Barrett and drummer Donnie Adkinson. The band has released two records through Brutal Panda Records and is known for its "intensely cathartic live shows".

== History ==
Whores was formed in 2010. In 2011, the band released their debut EP, Ruiner, through Brutal Panda Records. This was followed by the EP Clean in 2013, which received attention from music websites such as Pitchfork, Exclaim!, and Sputnikmusic. A split single with the band Rabbits, which consists of The Cure covers, was also released in 2014. On October 28, 2016, they released their new album Gold via eOne Music.

The band has toured the United States alongside acts such as Red Fang, Melvins, Retox, Torche, The Sword, Black Tusk, Deafheaven, Floor, Kylesa, Obliterations, Iron Reagan, Fight Amp, Haan, Louisiana band Capra, and Creepoid.

On February 24, 2024, the band released a new single, "Sicko", from their second studio album, War., which was released on April 12.

== Musical style ==
The band's music is mainly described as noise rock and sludge metal. Pitchfork Media reviewer Andy O'Connor noted the influences of Melvins, Helmet, Karp, Pissed Jeans, and Amphetamine Reptile Records artists.

The band also collaborated with many figures of the noise rock scene. The band's first EP was mastered by Harvey Milk drummer Kyle Spence and their sophomore EP was produced by Ryan Boesch, who worked with various acts such as Melvins, Fu Manchu, Helmet and Foo Fighters.

== Band members ==
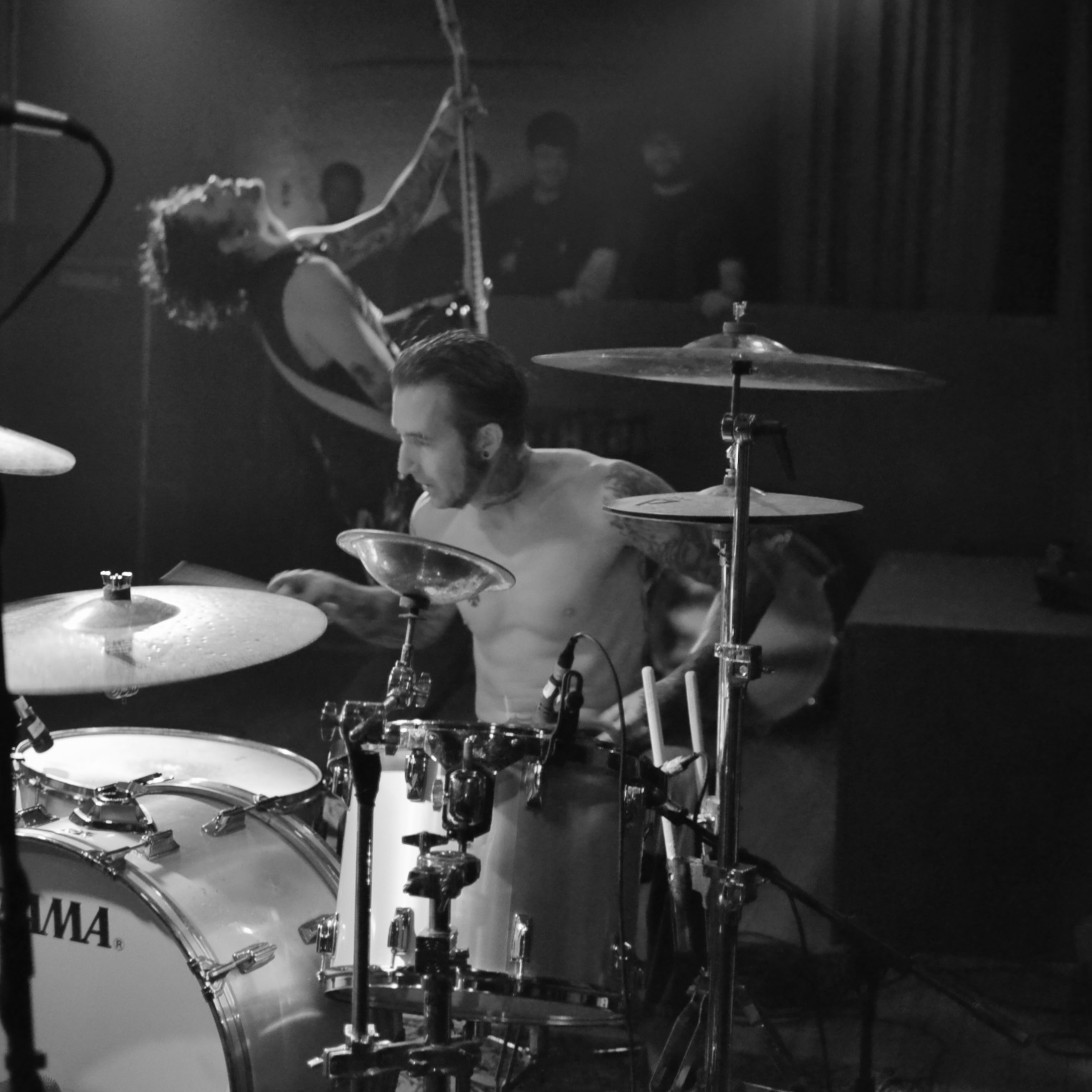
Whores performing in 2012; Travis Owen (front) and Jake Schultz (back)

=== Current members ===
- Christian Lembach – vocals, guitar (2010–present)
- Donnie Adkinson – drums (2014–2019, 2024–present)
- Douglas Jennings Barrett – drums (2021–2024), bass (2025–present)

=== Former members ===
- Steven Higginbottom – bass (2010–2011)
- Travis Owen – drums (2010–2014)
- Jake Schultz – bass (2011–2015) (former bassist for Norma Jean)
- Casey Maxwell – bass (2015–2025)
- Joel Willis – drums (2019–2021)

== Discography ==
Studio albums

- Gold (2016)
- War (2024)

EPs

- Ruiner (2011)
- Clean (2013)

Singles

- Split (2014, split single with Rabbits)
- Bloody Like The Day You Were Born (2014, Originally released on the "Dope-Guns-'N-Fucking In The Streets Volume Thirteen" compilation by Amphetamine Reptile Records)
- Flag Day (2017)
- Cornucopia (2020, Black Sabbath cover, originally released on Various - Vol. 4 (Redux))
- Have A Drink On Me (2021, AC/DC cover)
