= Darkness Divided (album) =

Studio album by Darkness Divided
- Released: April 22, 2016
- Genre: Metalcore; Christian metal
- Label: Victory

Darkness Divided chronology
Written in Blood (2014)	Darkness Divided (2016)

Darkness Divided is the self-titled second and final studio album from the Christian metalcore band Darkness Divided. Victory Records released the album on April 22, 2016.

== Background ==
Gerard Mora gave an interview to Outburn, where he was asked "How has being a Christian metalcore band helped or hurt, and are you trying to avoid that label this time around?", while his response was the following:

Our band has always been a Christian band, and I've always believed that if you're a Christian, that should influence every aspect of your life. I felt like I had a moral obligation to write lyrics from a Christian perspective to bring positivity into people's lives. As far as this record goes, Darkness Divided is more secular. We wanted it to be more relatable to people who weren't Christians. We want them to start asking the big questions about why they believe the things they believe in. Regardless of what you believe, you have to question your belief's at some point. So, yeah, this is a Christian record, but it's an invitation to people, not something we're forcing on anyone. We don't want to offend or ostracize anyone. We want to welcome them.

— Gerard Mora, Outburn

== Critical reception ==
Professional ratings
Review scores
Source	Rating
New Noise Magazine	4.5/5 stars
Outburn	9/10

Tyler Davidson, giving the album a nine out of ten at Outburn, states, "On this self-titled album, San Antonio's Darkness Divided showcases a highly evolved, deeply matured metal sound not often heard, let alone on a sophomore album." Awarding the album four and a half stars from New Noise Magazine, Nicholas Senior writes, "It’s great to see a talented band truly capitalize on their potential with such a successful sophomore album." Chad Brown, reviewing the album at New-Transcendence, states, "Their newest self-titled release continues this impressive track record."

== Track listing ==
No.	Title	Length
1.	"The Point of No Return"	3:46
2.	"Back Breaker"	4:02
3.	"A Life That Binds"	3:42
4.	"Wake of the End"	2:56
5.	"Misery"	3:20
6.	"Deceiver"	3:34
7.	"From Dust to Stone"	4:30
8.	"The Answer"	3:24
9.	"Deliverance"	3:19
10.	"Mirror of Death"	2:15
11.	"The End of It All"	3:44
Total length:		38:32

== Chart performance ==
Chart (2016)	Peak position
US Top Hard Rock Albums (Billboard)	25
US Heatseekers Albums (Billboard)	20
