= Al-Namrood =

Saudi Arabian black metal band

- Origin: Saudi Arabia
- Genres: Black metal, oriental metal
- Years active: 2008–present
- Labels: Shaytan Productions
- Members: Mephisto; Ostron; Artiya'il
- Past members: Darius; Mukadars; Mudamer; Learza; Humbaba

Al-Namrood (Arabic: النمرود) is a Saudi Arabian black metal band. The name means "Nimrod", a biblical figure and Babylonian king, which the group chose as a form of defiance against religion. The members are anonymous since their identification could lead to punishment of death from Saudi Arabian authorities.

Al-Namrood has released numerous albums and singles since its launch in 2008. The band has also released three music videos and are signed to Shaytan Productions (Canada).

== Discography ==
=== Studio albums ===
- Astfhl Al Thar (2009, استُفحِل الثأر) (Revenge Was Unleashed)
- Estorat Taghoot (2010, أُسطورة طاغوت) (Juggernaut Legend)
- Kitab Al Awthan (2012, كتابُ الأوثان) (The Book Of Idols)
- Heen Yadhar Al Ghasq (2014, حينَ يَظهر الغسق) (When Dusk Appears)
- Diaji Al Joor (2015, دياجي الجور) (Diaji The Unjust)
- Enkar (2017, إنكار) (Denial)
- Wala'at (2020, ولاءات) (Loyalties)
- Worship The Degenerate (2022)
- Al Aqrab (2024, الأقرب) (The Closest)
- Al Burzakh (2025, برزخ) (Separation)

=== Singles and EPs ===
- Atbaa Al-Namrood (2008, أتباع النمرود) (Nimrod's Followers)
- Jaish Al-Namrood (2013, جيش النمرود) (Nimrod's Army)
- Ana Al Tughian (2015, أنا الطُغيان) (I Am Tyranny)
- Beat The Bastards (2015, The Exploited cover)
- Bleached Bones (2016, Marduk cover)
- Hell On Earth (2018, Toxic Holocaust cover)

=== Music videos ===
Year	Title	Director
2014	“Bat Al Tha ar Nar Muheja”	Kalen Artinian
2015	“Hayat Al Khezea”	A Legacy Studio Production
2017	“Nabth”	SilverFrame Productions

=== Compilations ===
- Ten Years of Resistance (2018)
