= Darkness Divided =

American metalcore band

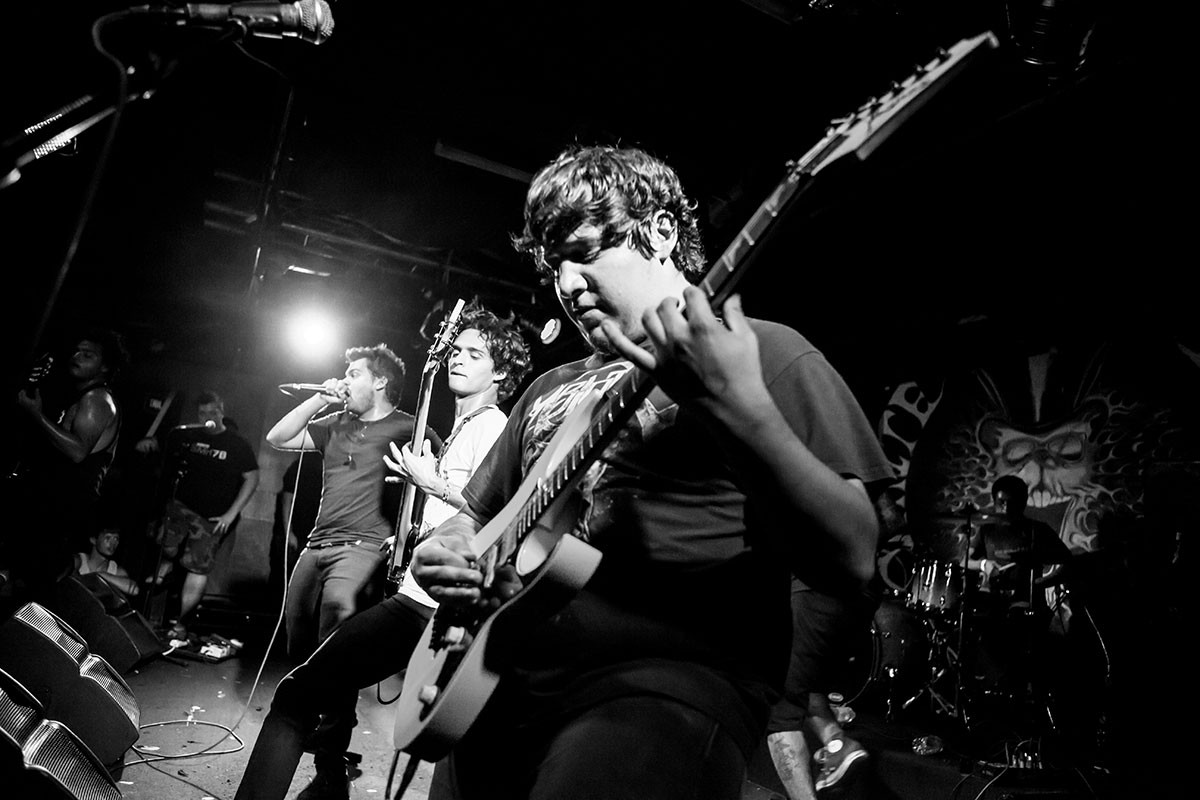
- From left to right: Christopher, Gerard, Joseph, Sebastian and Isaiah

Background information
- Origin: San Antonio, Texas, U.S.
- Genres: Metalcore, Christian metal, Black metal
- Years active: 2010–2018, 2022-present
- Label: Victory Records
- Members: Gerard Mora; Sebastian Elizondo; Joseph Mora; Christopher Mora; Hayden Allen
- Past members: Israel Hernandez; Isaiah Alfonso

Darkness Divided is an American Christian metalcore band from San Antonio, Texas, formed in 2010 by brothers Gerard, Christopher, and Joseph Mora. The band had released two studio albums through Victory Records as well as an independent EP.

== History ==
=== Early years and formation (2010–2012) ===
As teenagers, the Mora brothers performed worship music together at their local church, mostly performing covers of contemporary worship songs. In 2010, the brothers changed genres and started Darkness Divided with original drummer Colby Moreno and second guitar/backup vocalist Joey Jiménez after becoming fans of metal music. The new band was named Darkness Divided after the Biblical verse Genesis 1:4, and is described by the band as a reference to finding hope in tough times.

=== Chronicles and Written in Blood (2012–2015) ===
In 2012, Darkness Divided released a 5 track EP entitled Chronicles, which was produced by Daniel Castleman.

Since releasing Chronicles, the band released two singles with accompanying music videos. Redeemer was produced with Daniel Castleman, while "Voyager" was produced elsewhere.

Prior to its release, Teen View Music stated that Written in Blood was

Intelligently put together and expertly recorded, Written in Blood has the fuel and fire for a metalcore fan. It is obvious to me just by listening to the album that their live shows are electric with energy and absolute loads of fun. For fans of Christian metal, this is a must-have.

Jesus Freak Hideout says "Heavy metal newcomers, Darkness Divided, will release their Victory Records debut album, Written In Blood, on August 19th. Written In Blood is an 11-track assault of deeply penetrating, sometimes chaotic, sometimes melodic, but always brutalizing metal core riffage coupled with crushing rhythmic breakdowns and Gerard Mora's thunderously demanding vocals. Driven by faith and fueled by conviction, Darkness Divided are on a mission to prove that through suffering comes salvation." They released a new single called "A Well Run Dry" off their upcoming album to iTunes and released an animated stream of the song to YouTube on July 15. They released their second single "The Hands That Bled" along with a music video on August 11.

=== Departure of Chris Mora, Induction of Hayden Allen, self titled album, The End of It All EP, breakup and reunion (2015–present) ===
On November 11, 2015, guitarist Chris Mora put out an announcement on the band's Facebook page.

Hey guys this is Chris. I'd like to introduce you to the new Darkness Divided lineup. The band has been a huge part of my life since I was 14 years old but now I'm sharing with you that I decided to step down earlier this year.

I've had the time of my life writing and producing the band's 2nd record over the past few months. It's the fruit of a lot of hard work, lessons learned, and growth from these four guys in this picture. You'll notice that with this change, they've brought Hayden Allen into the scheme of things. He's an insanely talented drummer and a great dude you will be stoked to eat Denny's with out there on tour. DD is stronger than ever before and I'm happy to have been a part of the process. I love these boys with my whole heart and I owe it to them for them keeping me together over the past few years. I'd like to thank all of the great people I met while in the band who dug what we were doing enough to support us in the countless ways that you did. The new record is going to blow your mind.

– Chris

In 2016, the band released their sophomore self titled on Victory Records. In 2017, the band embarked on many tours. The band would go on tour with Convictions in October 2017, replacing Earth Groans, who took the first half of the date.

In late 2017, the band announced they would disband in 2018 after releasing one final EP and doing one final tour from March to May, with the final show taking place at the Alamo City Music Hall in San Antonio, Texas, on May 12. The band released their final EP, The End of It All, digitally on March 9.

In 2022, Darkness Divided reunited and performed at several shows throughout Texas. In 2024, the band released a new single, "King Of The Undertow".

== Music and lyrics ==
Gerard Mora gave an interview in Outburn, where he was asked "What lyrical themes do you explore?", while his response was the following:

We're a Christian band and that's apparent in everything we do, so our lyrics are very Christian based, but they're not meant to come off as judgey or condemny. We view our band as a ministry, but we do it as an open invitation to talk. We don't go and sit in our van while the other bands are playing. We go out to meet people and to make sure that people feel the love that we feel through Christ. So, a lot of that comes across in our lyrics. For Written in Blood, the lyrics all deal with the theme that in life there's struggle, and as people we all go through our trials, but the idea is that we're all suffering together. It's reassuring to know that other people are going through the same problems, whether it's people across the world or our neighbors.

— Gerard Mora, Outburn

He was also asked during the same interview, "Could you ever see yourselves touring with a secular band?", and his answer was the following:

Absolutely. Our statement is bold, but we're not here to judge anyone. We want to meet people and talk to people. This might be the only glimpses of love or any kind of hope that they might get that week, so it's an open invitation. It's not like we want you to be whatever we are. We played with Suffokate a few weeks ago, and they were really cool dudes and we had a great show together. It's not like we want to circle around the Christian market, preaching to the choir. That's not what we're about.

— Gerard Mora, Outburn

== Members ==
Lineup

- Gerard Mora – lead vocals (2010–present)
- Joseph Mora – bass guitar (2010–present)
- Christopher James Mora – lead guitar (2010–present)
- Sebastian Elizondo – vocals (2014–present), lead guitar (2015–present), rhythm guitar (2014–present)
- Hayden Allen – drums (2015–present)

Former members

- Israel Hernandez – drums (2010–2014)
- Isaiah Alfonso – drums (2014–2015)

Session members

- Juan Hinojosa – drums (2018)

Timeline

== Discography ==
Darkness Divided discography
- Studio albums: 2
- EPs: 1
- Singles: 6
- Music videos: 3

=== Studio albums ===
Year	Title	Label	Chart peaks	
Year	Title	Label	US Hard Rock	Heatseekers
2014	Written in Blood	Victory Records	—	—
2016	Darkness Divided	Victory Records	25	20

=== EPs ===
- Chronicles (2012)
- The End of It All (2018)

=== Singles ===
Year	Song	Album
2010	"Divide and Conquer"	None
2012	"Truth"	Chronicles
2013	"Redeemer"	None
2013	"Voyager"	None
2013	"Remnants"	Written in Blood
2014	"A Well Run Dry"	Written in Blood
2014	"The Hands That Bled"	Written in Blood
2024	"King Of The Undertow"	Non-album single

=== Music videos ===
Year	Album	Song	Director	Type	Link
2013	Chronicles	"Redeemer"	Lee Eubanks	Narrative	
2013	None	"Voyager"	Nelson Flores and Mathis Arnell	Narrative	
2013	Written in Blood	"Remnants"	Unknown	Narrative	
2014	Written in Blood	"The Hands That Bled"	Eric Richter	Narrative	
2014	Written in Blood	"Eternal Thirst"	Brian Raida	Narrative	
2016	Darkness Divided	"Misery"	Dustin Smith	Narrative	
2016	Darkness Divided	"Back Breaker"	Dustin Smith	Narrative	
