= Darkend =

Italian symphonic black metal band

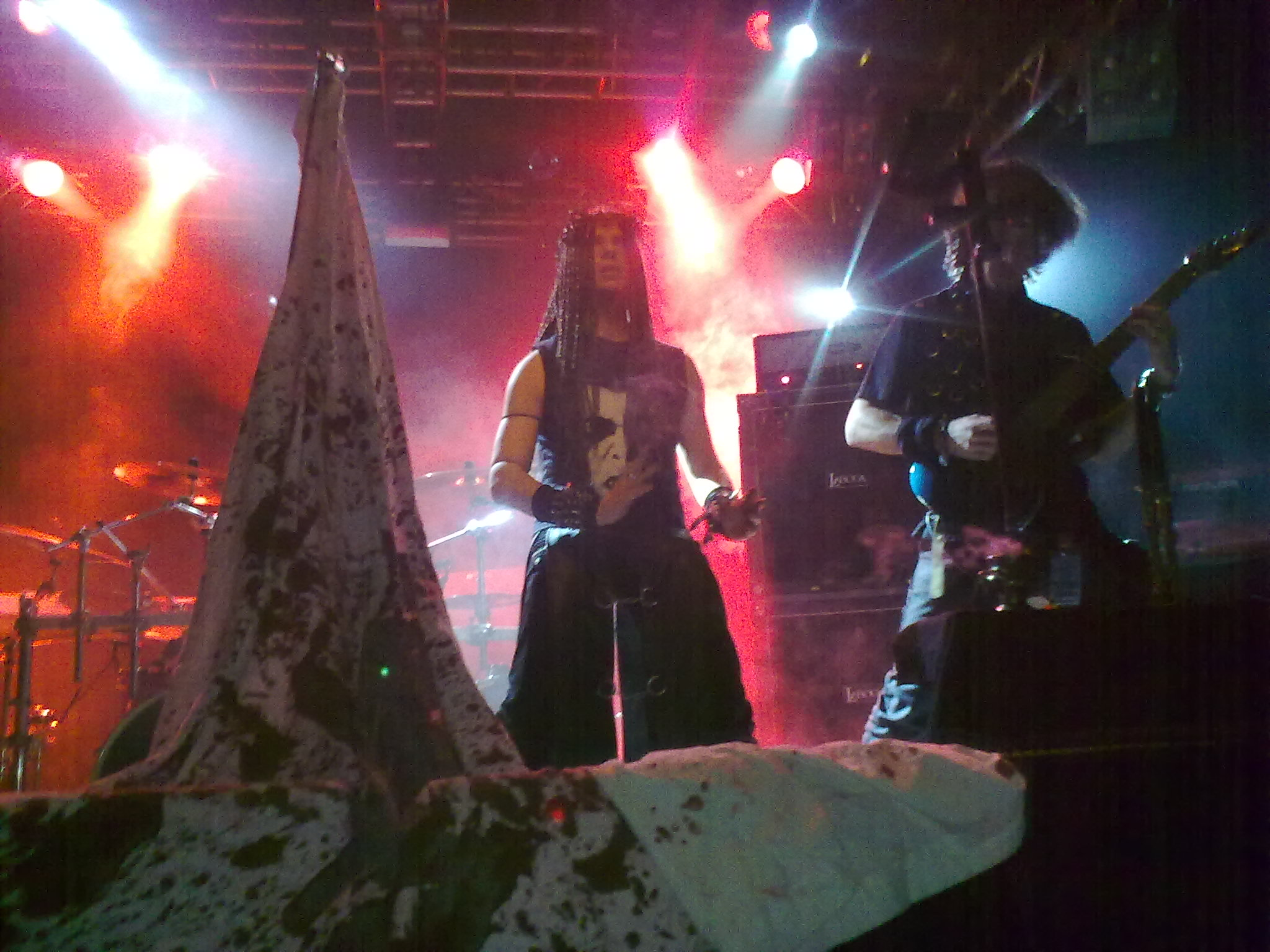
- Animæ and Nothingness on stage in Helsinki, Finland.

Background information
- Origin: Italy
- Genres: Symphonic black metal
- Years active: 2006–present
- Labels: Arcane Witchcraft Coven; Necromantik Records; Deadsun Records
- Members: Animæ; Antarktica; Ashes; Nothingness; Specter; Valentz
- Website: Darkend Official

Darkend (or Dark End) is an Italian symphonic black metal band. According to the band itself, the genre of their music is referred to as "Extreme Ritual Metal", which best describes the band's musical and visual outcome and highlights the most relevant sides of their style.

== History ==
Darkend was founded in 2006 by guitarist Imajes and drummer Valentz. Later that year Antarktica joined as keyboardist and the band gave their first live performances. The first album Damned Woman and A Carcass was recorded in the same year, with Valentz as temporary vocalist.

In April 2007 an important turn in the band's history occurred when Animæ joined as vocalist. In the same year Nekromantik Records released Damned Woman and a Carcass, which was later remastered by Deadsun Records for distribution in Europe and North America.

In 2008 Darkend performed in their homeland Italy, with bands such as Marduk, Impaled Nazarene and Stormlord.

In 2009 the line-up changed again with the admission of two new members: Specter as bass player and Ashes as guitarist. 2010 saw the release of their second album Assassine under the label Crash & Burn Records, now with Animæ in charge of the vocals for the first time.

In May 2011 Darkend did their first European tour with Rotting Christ. In September they supported Samael, Melechesh and Keep of Kalessin on Lux Mundi World Tour. In October, Nothingness replaced Imajes on guitar and the band thus assumed their current configuration.

At the end of February 2012 Grand Guignol - Book I was released in special limited edition with the support of the Arcane Witchcraft Coven esoteric order, which decided to finance the release in exchange for exclusive ritualistic music by Darkend. In November Darkend participated in the Creatures From the Black Abyss Tour in Europe with Cradle of Filth, Rotting Christ and God Seed.

== Discography ==
=== Albums ===
- Damned Woman and A Carcass (2007)
- Assassine (2010)
- Grand Guignol - Book I (2012)
- The Canticle Of Shadows (2016)
- Spiritual Resonance (2019)
- Viaticum (2024)

== Sources ==
- https://www.facebook.com/darkendofficial#!/darkendofficial
