= Decision Day =

Studio album by Sodom
- Released: 26 August 2016
- Recorded: 2015–2016
- Genre: Thrash metal
- Length: 50:47
- Label: SPV/Steamhammer
- Producer: Cornelius Rambadt

Sodom chronology
Sacred Warpath (2014)	Decision Day (2016)	Genesis XIX (2020)

Professional ratings
Review scores
Source	Rating
Metal Injection	7.5/10
Metal Hammer	6/7
Rock Hard	8.5/10

Decision Day is the fifteenth studio album by the German thrash metal band Sodom, released on 26 August 2016. This is Sodom's final album with guitarist Bernd "Bernemann" Kost and drummer Markus "Makka" Freiwald, who both parted ways with the band in January 2018, and it would be the last time the band had recorded together as a three-piece, a distinction Sodom had held since its inception. The artwork of Decision Day was designed by Joe Petagno. "Sacred Warpath", a track released two years earlier on the EP with the same title, was also re-recorded for this album.

== Track listing ==
No.	Title	Length
1.	"In Retribution"	6:14
2.	"Rolling Thunder"	4:22
3.	"Decision Day"	4:03
4.	"Caligula"	4:01
5.	"Who Is God?"	4:35
6.	"Strange Lost World"	4:59
7.	"Vaginal Born Evil"	5:15
8.	"Belligerence"	4:00
9.	"Blood Lions"	3:17
10.	"Sacred Warpath"	5:34
11.	"Refused to Die"	4:27
Total length:		50:47

iTunes/vinyl edition bonus track
No.	Title	Length
12.	"Predatory Instinct"	4:44
Total length:		55:31

== Personnel ==
=== Credits ===
- Tom Angelripper – vocals and bass guitar
- Bernd "Bernemann" Kost – lead and rhythm guitar
- Markus "Makka" Freiwald – drums

=== Production ===
- Cornelius Rambadt – production
- Joe Petagno – album cover

== Charts ==
Chart (2016)	Peak position
Austrian Albums (Ö3 Austria)	29
Czech Albums (ČNS IFPI)	30
German Albums (Offizielle Top 100)	7
Swiss Albums (Schweizer Hitparade)	42
US Heatseekers Albums (Billboard)	25
