= Eths =

French metal band

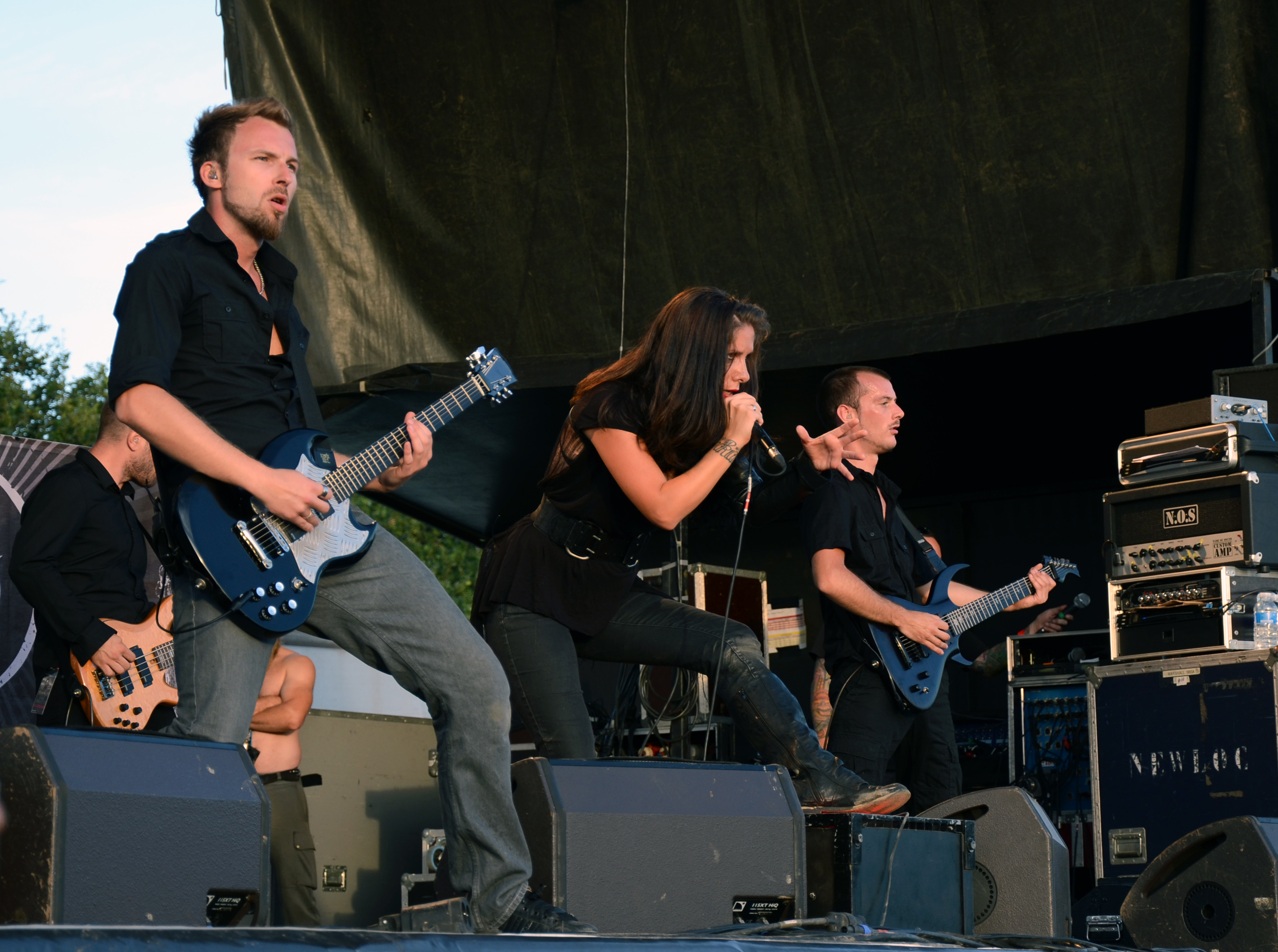
- Eths performing at the Motocultor Festival 2012

Background information
- Origin: Marseille, France
- Genres: Metalcore; nu metal; groove metal; death metal
- Years active: 1996–1997 (as What's the Fuck); 1997–1999 (as Melting Point); 1999–2016, 2017, 2023
- Label: Season of Mist
- Past members: Stéphane "Staif" Bihl; Marc "Roswell" Burghoffer; Candice Clot; Guillaume "Yom" Dupré; Grégory "Greg" Rouvière; Damien Rivoal; Rachel Aspe; R.U.L.
- Website: eths.net

Eths (variably stylized as eths and ETHS) was a French heavy metal band from Marseille, formed in 1996.

== History ==
Eths formed in 1996 under the name What's the Fuck, with a lineup consisting of vocalist-guitarist Stéphane Bihl and guitarist Grégory Rouvière. The following year, Candice Clot, the best friend of Bihl's ex-girlfriend, joined the group as a lead vocalist, and the band was renamed Melting Point.

Through 1999, drummer Guillaume Dupré and bassist Marc Burghoffer were added to the lineup, and together they formed Eths. That same year they released a first demo titled Eths, containing "Encore" and "Rien à Dire". The band also appeared on a CD compilation titled Attentat Sonore.

The band was part of Coriace, a small collective bringing together metal bands representing southeast France.

In 2000, Eths released a seven-track EP titled Autopsie.

On 14 November 2001, Eths was the opening act for Machine Head at L'Usine in Istres. The band featured on two CD compilations, Boukan and A Core Et à Cri.

In March 2002, Eths made a television appearance at Rock Press Club's Canal Jimmy, performing "Samantha" and "Dévore". In September 2002, the band released a second EP titled Samantha and gained acclaim in the French extreme metal circuit.

On 11 October 2004, Eths released its first full-length album, Soma, and launched a 120-date national concert tour. That year, Clot, who sang exclusively in her native language, said that she wrote "about things that scare me, that disgust me, about what I have inside of me".

In 2006, the group announced the departure of both Dupré and Burghoffer. As a result, the drumming on Eths' 2007 album Tératologie was performed by Pierre Belleville, then the drummer for Lofofora. Dupré returned to the band in 2011. Through constant touring, Soma would go on to sell over 25,000 copies.

Considered "very popular in part of the youth" in France, Eths was often featured on the covers of Hard 'n' Heavy, Rock One, Rock Mag, and Rock Sound magazines.

On 18 September 2012, frontwoman Candice Clot left the band. Virginie Goncalves of Kells and Nelly Wood replaced Clot as temporary touring vocalists.

In 2013, the group announced Rachel Aspe as their new lead vocalist. In the same month, an injury led Rouvière to depart the band.

On 30 November 2016, the band notified the public of their breakup via a Facebook post and announced their last concert in Angers on 3 December 2016.

The original lineup of Bihl, Clot, Rouvière, Dupré, and Burghoffer reunited to play two final concerts, which took place at Le Moulin in Marseille and Le Trianon in Paris, on 8 April 2017, and 30 April 2017, respectively. The two concerts were also a posthumous homage to the band's friends, Mika Bleu and Julien Isilion.

On 15 December 2022, the official Eths Facebook page was updated with the status "Eths 2023". Shortly after, the band was confirmed to perform at Hellfest in June 2023.

== Musical style and influences ==
Eths cited as influences Meshuggah, Tool, Gojira, Korn, Sepultura, and Metallica. They also appreciated electro, hip hop and jazz. Clot cited alternative rock band Hole as an early influence. Clot had no female voices as references but respected the work of My Ruin's Tairrie B. Aspe said her early influences include Slipknot and Walls Of Jericho, bands that made her discover "her vocal range while growling".

Eths' musical style was described as metalcore, groove metal, and nu metal. La Dépêche du Midi described the band as "Practising a neo-metal imbued with black [metal] and unscrupulously favouring a slight tendency for death metal." Metal Hammer called the band "dark tech-metal".

Author Jérôme Alberola wrote that Autopsie, Samantha and Soma displayed "gothic-tinged death metal" featuring blast beats that directed the band's musical aggression towards "the deathcore subgenre". Heavy metal magazine Hard Force labelled Soma as alternative metal, Tératologie and Ankaa as death metal, and III as metalcore.

Bihl stated the band liked to mix styles because they tended to get weary. Clot emphasised, "We do metal, because it brings together all our influences, and we all like different things, without labels."

Clot was the primary lyricist, but Bihl and Dupré also took part.

== Members ==
=== Final line-up ===
- Stéphane "Staif" Bihl — guitar, sampling, vocals (1999–2016, 2017)
- Grégory "Greg" Rouvière — guitar (1999–2013, 2017)
- Candice Clot — lead vocals (1999–2012, 2017)
- Guillaume "Yom" Dupré — drums (1999–2006, 2011–2015, 2017)
- Marc "Roswell" Burghoffer — bass (1999–2006, 2017)

=== Former members ===
- Damien Rivoal — bass (2011–2016)
- Rachel Aspe — lead vocals (2013–2016)

=== Touring members ===
- Geoffrey "Shob" Neau — bass (2007–2011)
- Matthieu "Mat" LeChevalier — drums (2007–2008)
- Morgan Berthet — drums (2008–2011)
- Virginie Goncalves — clean vocals (2012–2013)
- Nelly Wood — unclean vocals (2012–2013)
- R.U.L. — drums (2013–2016)

=== Session musicians ===
- Dirk Verbeuren — drums (Ankaa)
- Pierre Belleville — drums (Tératologie)
- Daniel "Dan" Ballin — bass (Tératologie)
- Fabrice "Donat" Ferrer — bass (Tératologie)

== Discography ==
Studio albums

Year	Title	Label
2004	Soma	Sriracha Records, Coriace Management
2007	Tératologie	Coriace Management
2012	III	Seasons of Mist
2016	Ankaa	Seasons of Mist
2017	The Best of Eths	-

EPs & Demos

As Melting Point

Year	Title	Label
1998	Melting Point	-

As Eths

Year	Title	Label
1999	Eths	-
2000	Autopsie	Musicast
2002	Samantha	Coriace Management
2004	Autopsie｜Samantha	Sriracha Records
2014	Ex Umbra In Solem	Seasons of Mist

Reissues

Year	Title	Label
2003	Autopsie	Coriace Management
2012	Soma	Seasons of Mist
2012	Autopsie｜Samantha	Coriace Management
