= Headbangers Symphony =

Studio album by Wolf Hoffmann
- Released: July 1, 2016
- Genres: Heavy metal, neoclassical metal
- Length: 48:43
- Label: Nuclear Blast
- Producer: Wolf Hoffmann

Wolf Hoffmann chronology
Classical (1997)	Headbangers Symphony (2016)

Professional ratings
Review scores
Source	Rating
Blabbermouth.net	(8/10)
BW&BK	(8.5/10)
Metal Shock Finland	(10/10)

Headbangers Symphony is the second solo album by German guitarist Wolf Hoffmann, released nineteen years after his first solo release, Classical. The album was released on July 1, 2016 via Nuclear Blast. The album is available on limited edition red vinyl, limited edition vinyl, digipack CD and digital album formats.

== Background ==
On December 1, 2014, Wolf revealed that he was working on a new solo album during an interview with Metal Shock Finland's Alison Booth before the Accept show in London on November 27. He claimed that he was working on the album during Accept's touring break. He described the album as "a lot more metal than the first one".

On April 22, 2016, German independent record label, Nuclear Blast, officially revealed the title, artwork, track list and release date of the album.

The first single from the album, "Scherzo", was released on June 6 worldwide and received more than ten thousand views in its first two days on YouTube. Nuclear Blast revealed the first trailer on June 15, in which Wolf explains why it took so long between his first classical release and Headbangers Symphony. He also explained the difficulties he faced when bringing the classical pieces together with metal music. The second trailer was published on June 23, showing Wolf driving his old Cadillac and talking about the album.

Devin Townsend recorded a bass track for the song "Dance of the Knights", which did not make the album due to legal issues. On June 23, Wolf Hoffmann revealed that he was working on a new video for the track "Night On Bald Mountain". The video was released the same day as the album on both Nuclear Blast and Accept's YouTube channels. It was viewed more than four thousand times on the Nuclear Blast channel in the first few hours of posting. The video starts with Wolf Hoffmann driving his car and four bikers heading toward a location where later they can be seen joining Wolf in playing the musical instruments. It also features Accept drummer Christopher Williams on drums.

Some tracks were played at the Wacken Open Air 2017 and released on the Accept live album Symphonic Terror: Live at Wacken (2018).

== Album information ==
Headbangers Symphony has eleven songs on its track list, which are arranged in the neoclassical metal music style. Even though the majority of musicians who are active in this genre tend to lean towards the baroque way, Wolf Hoffmann mainly involves elements from the romantic period of classical music on this album.

- The song "Scherzo" is an adaptation of Ludwig van Beethoven’s "Symphony No. 9". Some guitar riffs are taken from "Teutonic Terror" from Accept's album Blood of the Nations.
- The song "Night on Bald Mountain" is an adaptation of Modest Mussorgsky's "Night on Bald Mountain".
- The song "Je crois entendre encore" is an adaptation of Georges Bizet's "Les pêcheurs de perles" Act 1.
- The song "Double Cello Concerto in G Minor" is an adaptation of Antonio Vivaldi's "Concerto for two cellos in G minor, RV531".
- The song "Adagio" is an adaptation of Tomaso Albinoni's "Adagio in G minor".
- The song "Symphony No. 40" is an adaptation of Wolfgang Amadeus Mozart's "Symphony No. 40".
- The song "Swan Lake" is an adaptation of Pyotr Ilyich Tchaikovsky's "Swan Lake".
- The song "Madame Butterfly" is an adaptation of Giacomo Puccini's composition from opera Madama Butterfly with different time signature.
- The song "Pathétique" is an adaptation of Ludwig van Beethoven's "Piano Sonata No. 8 in C minor, Op. 13".
- The song "Méditation" is an adaptation of Jules Massenet's "Méditation" from opera Thaïs.
- The song "Air on the G String" is an adaptation of Johann Sebastian Bach's "Orchestral Suite No. 3 in D major, BWV 1068", also known as "Air on the G String".

== Track listing ==
No.	Title	Length
1.	"Scherzo"	5:22
2.	"Night on Bald Mountain"	4:22
3.	"Je crois entendre encore"	4:17
4.	"Double Cello Concerto in G Minor"	3:31
5.	"Adagio"	5:45
6.	"Symphony No. 40"	4:10
7.	"Swan Lake"	4:45
8.	"Madame Butterfly"	3:57
9.	"Pathétique"	5:40
10.	"Meditation"	4:04
11.	"Air on the G String"	2:50
Total length:		48:43

== Personnel ==
Production and performance credits are adapted from the album liner notes.

- Wolf Hoffmann – guitars
- Jason Bowld and Pat McDonald – drums (Scherzo, Symphony No. 40)
- Peter Baltes and Matthias Rethmann – bass (Symphony No. 40, Air on the G String)
- John Billings – bass (Double Cello Concerto in G Minor)
- Melo Mafali – keyboards
- Czech National Symphony Orchestra – strings

=== Technical and production personnel ===
- Wolf Hoffmann – producer
- Daniel Rowlans and Andy Sneap – mixing
- Landr and Daniel Rowlans – mastering
- Stanislav Baroch and Pro Tools Operator Vojtech Komarek – audio engineer
- Studio CNSO, Prague – orchestra recording
- Melo Mafali – string arrangements
- Jan Chalupecky – conductor
- Dirk Baldringer, Michael Voss, Eric Sanders, Gereon Homann, Jan Richter, Jon McDaniel – contributors

== Charts ==
Chart (2016)	Peak position
Belgian Albums (Ultratop Wallonia)	169
German Albums (Offizielle Top 100)	90
French Albums (SNEP)	193
Swiss Albums (Schweizer Hitparade)	75
