= Turan (album) =

Studio album by Darkestrah
- Released: 29 April 2016
- Recorded: March–September 2015
- Genre: Folk metal
- Length: 52:23
- Label: Osmose Productions (France)
- Producer: Andy Schmidt

Darkestrah studio albums chronology
Manas (2013)	Turan (2016)

Turan is the sixth and latest album of shamanic metal band Darkestrah, released on 29 April 2016. All music composed during the years 2014 and 2015 by Darkestrah, except the introduction by Turan Ensemble, Kazakhstan.

It is the second album of Darkestrah released by Osmose Productions. It is the first album to feature the vocalist Merkith, as well.

== Critical reception ==
Professional ratings
Review scores
Source	Rating
Metal Hammer	4/5 stars
Metalstorm	7.6/10
newnoisemagazine	4.5/5 stars
folkmetalmagazine	7.5/10

The album received 4/5 score from Metal Hammer and hailed it as being an "epic folk metal album". Angry Metal Guy gave the album 3.5 stars out of 5, however mentioned the importance of previous albums over Turan. Grim Lord from NewNoiseMagazine gave the album 4.5 stars out of 5 and praised it being an atmospheric black metal act.

== Track listing ==
No.	Title	Length
1.	"One with the grey spirit"	10:23
2.	"Erlik-Khan"	08:09
3.	"Conversions of the seer"	07:53
4.	"Gleaming Madness"	06:59
5.	"Bird of prey"	09:46
6.	"The hidden light"	09:13

== Personnel ==
- Asbath – drums, percussion, temir komuz
- Resurgemus – guitars, synthesizers
- Merkith – vocals
- Cerritus – bass
- Ragnar – guitars
