= Clean (Whores EP) =

EP by Whores.
- Released: September 29, 2013
- Recorded: Parhelion Recording Studios
- Genre: Noise rock, sludge metal
- Length: 24:23
- Label: Brutal Panda
- Producer: Ryan Boesch

Whores. chronology
Ruiner EP (2011)	Clean (2013)

Clean (stylized as Clean.) is the second EP release by American noise rock band Whores. It was released on October 29, 2013, via Brutal Panda Records. The EP was produced and mixed by Ryan Boesch, who is known for his engineering work for acts such as Melvins, Helmet and Foo Fighters.

== Critical reception ==
Professional ratings
Review scores
Source	Rating
Exclaim!	9/10
Orlando Weekly	4/5 stars
Pitchfork	(6.4/10)
Sputnikmusic	4.1/5

Upon its release, Clean generally received positive reviews. Natalie Zina Walschots of Exclaim! praised the album, writing: "The songs are appallingly catchy and "Blue Blood," in particular, drives its hooks in as deeps as barbed porcupine quills, refusing to be dislodged. Rarely has an act of musical self-immolation been so enjoyable." Orlando Weekly music reviewer Bao Le-Huu stated: "Dealing in exhilarating violence and rampaging heaviness, this record is kin to releases by bands like Unsane and Pissed Jeans, but with more concussive torque and searing clarity." Andy O'Connor of Pitchfork was rather mixed in his assessment of the album: "It doesn't push or expand the genre, and it doesn't feel like that's the point: it, more or less, feels like they wanted something to put on their merch table, and an excuse to ditch town for a week, and Clean is serving that purpose. Not the worst thing in the world, but also not the most inspired." Sputnikmusic staff reviewer Greg Fisher felt that the album "may not appeal to those who seek experimentation in heavy music", while stating that the band's "ultra-loud brand of noise rock seethes with enough unbridled anger, songwriting dexterity and alluring hooks to exert a lasting impact."

== Track listing ==
All tracks written by Whores.

1. "Baby Bird" - 3:41
2. "Last Looks" - 4:07
3. "I Am Not a Goal-Oriented Person" - 2:57
4. "Cougars, Not Kittens" - 6:41
5. "Blue Blood" - 1:41
6. "I Am an Amateur at Everything" - 5:16

== Personnel ==
Whores

- Christian Lembach - vocals, guitar
- Jake Schultz - bass
- Travis Owen - drums

Technical personnel

- Ryan Boesch - mixing, recording, production
- Patrick "JJP" Copeland - artwork
