= Sockweb =

American grindcore band (2013–2016)

- Origin: Richmond, Indiana, U.S.
- Genres: Grindcore
- Years active: 2013–2016
- Label: Monolithic
- Members: Joanie Young; Adam Young (deceased)

Sockweb was an American grindcore band from Richmond, Indiana, formed in early 2013. The band was best known for its unusual father-daughter lineup, having been formed by Verata Necti's Adam "Blackula" Young and his then six-year-old daughter, Joanie "Bologna" Young, and for going viral with their song "I Want Pancakes".

== History ==
After the release of Sockweb's first song, "I Want Pancakes", the group became a viral hit in metal circles, with websites such as MetalSucks and eventually reputed UK magazine Rock Sound. After the release of two more songs, "Broken Glass Swan Dive" and "Werewolf" (featuring Spiralmountain's Erik Ebsen), the duo announced that they had signed to Monolithic Records to release their debut album, Werewolf, later in 2013, accompanied by another new song, "Bullies Are Mean". In June 2013, Sockweb released full details of their album. Kat Katz of Agoraphobic Nosebleed, one of Joanie's favorite vocalists, will make a guest appearance on Werewolf, with mastering by Scott Hull, and was set to be released on August 6, 2013; however, this release date was pushed back to March 25, 2014. A music video for "Werewolf" was released on August 5, 2013.

Despite some concerns from the metal community ranging from the novelty factor of the band to health concerns over the strain on Joanie's throat from screaming at such a young age, Adam made it clear in interviews that he took great care in making sure that his daughter's vocal cords were not put under too much strain when the band are recording and that he would stop the band if Joanie ever damaged her throat by performing.

In April 2016, Adam was arrested for two counts of intimidation, pointing a firearm, strangulation, four counts of domestic battery, and criminal mischief. It was alleged that he beat his girlfriend and forced her to shove her head into an oven. The arrest report said that Adam allegedly told his girlfriend that he would "slice her open and play with her intestines". On June 10, 2016, it was announced that Adam was found dead in his basement after hanging himself. His mother posted the news to his fans on Facebook, attacking "those that turned their back on him" and claiming that the abuse charges had been dropped. However, his fiancé, Caroline Mosley, refuted her claims while public records proved that the abuse case was still ongoing with no charges dropped.

== Members ==
- Joanie "Bologna" Young – vocals (2013–2016)
- Adam "Blackula" Young – vocals, guitars, bass guitar, programming, sampling (2013–2016)

== Discography ==
- Bullies Are Mean (EP) (2013, Monolithic Records)
- Werewolf (2014, Monolithic Records)
