= Painted in Exile =

American progressive metal band

- Origin: Long Island, New York US
- Genres: Progressive metal, technical death metal, metalcore, jazzcore
- Years active: 2007–present
- Members: William Murphy; James Murphy; Marcus Becker; Robert Richards
- Website: facebook.com/paintedinexile

Painted in Exile is an American progressive metal band from Long Island, New York with mathcore, technical death metal, metalcore, jazz, and hip hop elements.

== Discography ==
=== Studio albums ===
- The Ordeal (2016)

=== Singles ===
- DM (2014)

=== EPs ===
- Revitalized (2009)
- 3.14 demo (2008)

== Videography ==
- "House of Cards" (2016)
- "Revitalized" (2010)

== Band members ==
Current

- William Murphy – Keyboards (2007–2011), Guitar (2026)
- James Murphy – Guitar (2007–2011), Guitar (2026)
- Marcus Becker– Bass (2007–2008), Guitar (2026)
- Robert Richards – Vocals (2007–2014) (2015–present)

Former

- Alan Hankers – Piano & Keyboards (2012–2017)
- Connor Larkin – Bass (2010)
- Vincent Romanelli – Bass (2008–2010)
- James Murphy – Guitar (2007–2010)
- William Murphy – Keyboard (2007–2010)
- Zak Avanzato – Bass (2007–2008)
- Marcus Becker – Guitar (2007–2008)

Timeline
