= Under Attack (Destruction album) =

Studio album by Destruction
- Released: 13 May 2016
- Recorded: 2015–2016
- Genre: Thrash metal
- Length: 47:38
- Label: Nuclear Blast
- Producer: Destruction

Destruction chronology
Spiritual Genocide (2012)	Under Attack (2016)	Thrash Anthems II (2017)

Professional ratings
Review scores
Source	Rating
Blabbermouth.net	9.5/10
Kerrang!	3/5 stars
Rock Hard	8.5/10

Under Attack is the thirteenth studio album by the German thrash metal band Destruction, released on 13 May 2016.

== Album title and lyrics ==
Regarding the title track, vocalist Marcel "Schmier" Schirmer said: "I think we are all under attack, it all starts with our mobile phones and our computers, (...) We are a hi-tech society, Under Attack was (...) a perfect title for showing the state of the earth, we're definitely going to have a lot of problems in the future if we don't wake up soon and chase some stuff. We always change stuff when it's too late!"

The lyrics on the song Second to None deal with cyber bullying and harassment, especially over the internet.

== Track listing ==
All songs written by Schmier and Sifringer, except track 11 (written by Conrad "Cronos" Lant, Jeffrey "Mantas" Dunn and Anthony "Abaddon" Bray) and track 12 (written by Schmier, Sifringer and Sandmann).

No.	Title	Length
1.	"Under Attack"	6:13
2.	"Generation Nevermore"	4:04
3.	"Dethroned"	4:50
4.	"Getting Used to the Evil"	6:08
5.	"Pathogenic"	4:27
6.	"Elegant Pigs"	3:40
7.	"Second to None"	5:11
8.	"Stand Up for What You Deliver"	4:20
9.	"Conductor of the Void"	4:33
10.	"Stigmatized"	4:12
Total length:		47:38

Limited edition bonus tracks
No.	Title	Length
11.	"Black Metal" (Venom cover)	3:14
12.	"Thrash Attack" (re-recording)	2:58
Total length:		53:50

== Personnel ==
=== Destruction ===
- Schmier – bass, vocals
- Mike Sifringer – guitars
- Wawrzyniec "Vaaver" Dramowicz – drums

=== Additional personnel ===
- Alex Camargo – vocals on "Black Metal"
- Martin Buchwalter – engineering
- VO Pulver – production, mixing, mastering
- Gyula Havancsák – artwork

== Charts ==
Chart (2016)	Peak position
Belgian Albums (Ultratop Flanders)	145
Belgian Albums (Ultratop Wallonia)	85
German Albums (Offizielle Top 100)	68
Swiss Albums (Schweizer Hitparade)	90
