= Ankaa (album) =

Studio album by Eths
- Released: 22 April 2016
- Genre: Death metal; melodic death metal; groove metal; alternative metal
- Label: Season of Mist

Eths chronology
Ex Umbra In Solem (2014)	Ankaa (2016)

Singles from Ankaa
- 1. "Alnilam" Released: 18 February 2016; 2. "Nihil Sine Causa" Released: 2 March 2016

Ankaa is the fourth studio album by the French metal band Eths, released on 22 April 2016 via Season of Mist. It is the first full album to feature vocalist Rachel Aspe, as well as the first without second guitarist Grégory "Greg" Rouvière and Guillaume "Yom" Dupré since Yom rejoined the band in 2011 (the pair left in 2013 and 2015 respectively). For this album, Dirk Verbeuren was hired to perform drum duties despite new drummer RUL joining Eths in 2015. The album's track list and first single "Alnilam" were first announced on February 18. On 2 March they released their second song, "Nihil Sine Causa", which features additional vocals from Sarah Layssac (Arkan) and Jon Howard (Threat Signal).

== Track listing ==
All tracks are written by Staif Bihl unless stated.

Ankaa
No.	Title	Lyrics	Length
1.	"Nefas"		3:49
2.	"Nihil Sine Causa" (feat. Jon Howard)		4:52
3.	"Amaterasu"	Bihl, Berardo	3:57
4.	"Seditio"		6:35
5.	"Nixi Dii"	Bihl, Berardo	7:58
6.	"Vae Victis"		5:05
7.	"HAR1" (feat. Björn Strid)	Henley, Bihl	4:03
8.	"Sekhet Aaru"		4:09
9.	"Kumari Kandam"	Bihl, Berardo	4:15
10.	"Alnitak"		4:04
11.	"Alnilam"		3:39
12.	"Mintaka"		5:06

== Personnel ==
Eths

- Rachel Aspe - lead vocals
- Staif Bihl - guitars, keyboards, programming, vocals, production, engineering
- Damien Rivoal - bass guitar

Other personnel

- Dirk Verbeuren - drums, percussion
- Guillaume Dupré – additional percussion on tracks 4, 5, 8, 10, 11 and 12.
- Sarah Layssac - vocals on "Sekhet Aaru" and additional vocals on tracks 1, 2, 3, 9, 10, 11 and 12.
- Jon Howard - additional vocals on "Nihil Sine Causa"
- Björn Strid - additional vocals on "HAR1"
- Faustine Berardo - additional vocals on tracks 3, 5 and 9.
- Serge Begnis - engineering
- Nelson Leeroy - mixing
- Mobo - mastering
- Nicolas Senegas - artwork

== Charts ==
Chart (2016)	Peak position
Belgian Albums (Ultratop Wallonia)	178
French Albums (SNEP)	154
