= Wodensthrone =

English atmospheric black metal band

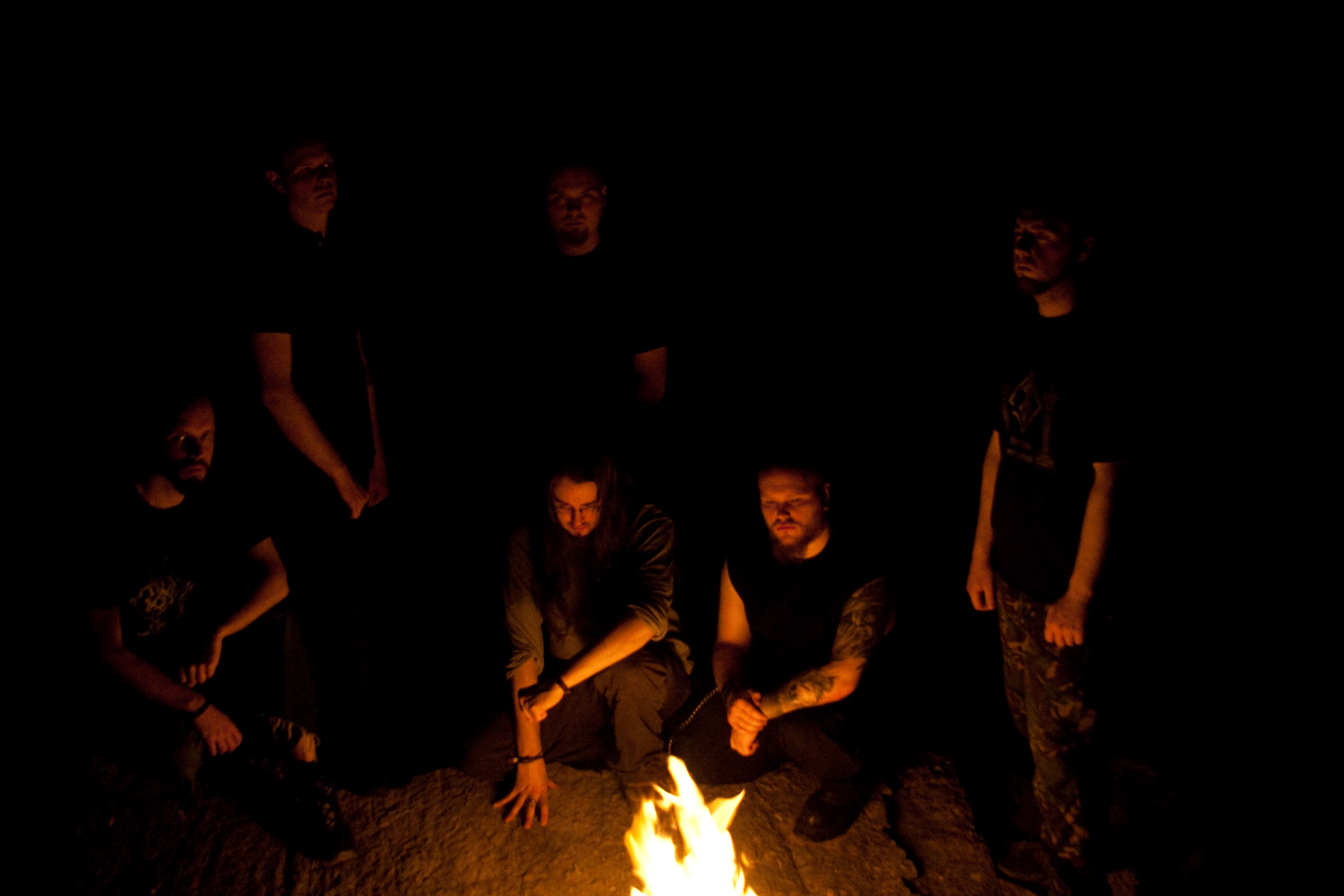

Background information
- Origin: Sunderland, England
- Genres: Atmospheric black metal, folk metal, pagan metal
- Years active: 2005–2016
- Label: Candlelight
- Past members: Wildeþrýð; Rædwalh; Árfæst; Gerádwine; HréowsianÆðelwalh; Eldbeorn; Padrig; Brunwulf

Wodensthrone were an English atmospheric black metal band from Sunderland. Since forming in 2005, the band has released two studio albums and two split albums.

== History ==
Wodensthrone formed in Sunderland, England in 2005 with an original lineup of Brunwulf, Wildeþrýð, Gerádwine and Hréowsian. In 2006 and 2008, the band released two split albums, Wodensthrone/Niroth (with Niroth) and Over the Binding of the Waves (with Folkvang) respectively. These releases brought Wodensthrone to the attention of the underground and the band was taken into the care of former Negurǎ Bunget member Edmond Karban for the recording of their debut album Loss. Loss, when released in 2009, proved to be a critical hit, earning the band a contract with Candlelight Records. Loss was reissued by Candlelight in 2010 and in 2012 the label released Wodensthrone's follow-up album, Curse.

In March 2016, guitarist and founding member Wildeþrýð left the band. As a result, the remaining members decided to end the band.

== Discography ==
=== Albums ===
- Loss (2009)
- Curse (2012)

=== Splits ===
- Wodensthrone/Niroth (2006)
- Over the Binding of the Waves (2008)

== Members ==
=== Final lineup ===
- Rædwalh - guitars, vocals
- Árfæst - keyboards
- Gerádwine - bass guitar
- Hréowsian - drums, percussion

=== Past members ===
- Wildeþrýð - guitars, vocals
- Brunwulf - vocals
- Æðelwalh - synths, vocals, tin whistle
- Eldbeorn - guitars

=== Session musicians ===
- Padrig - Mandolin, tin whistle
