= List of U.D.O. band members =

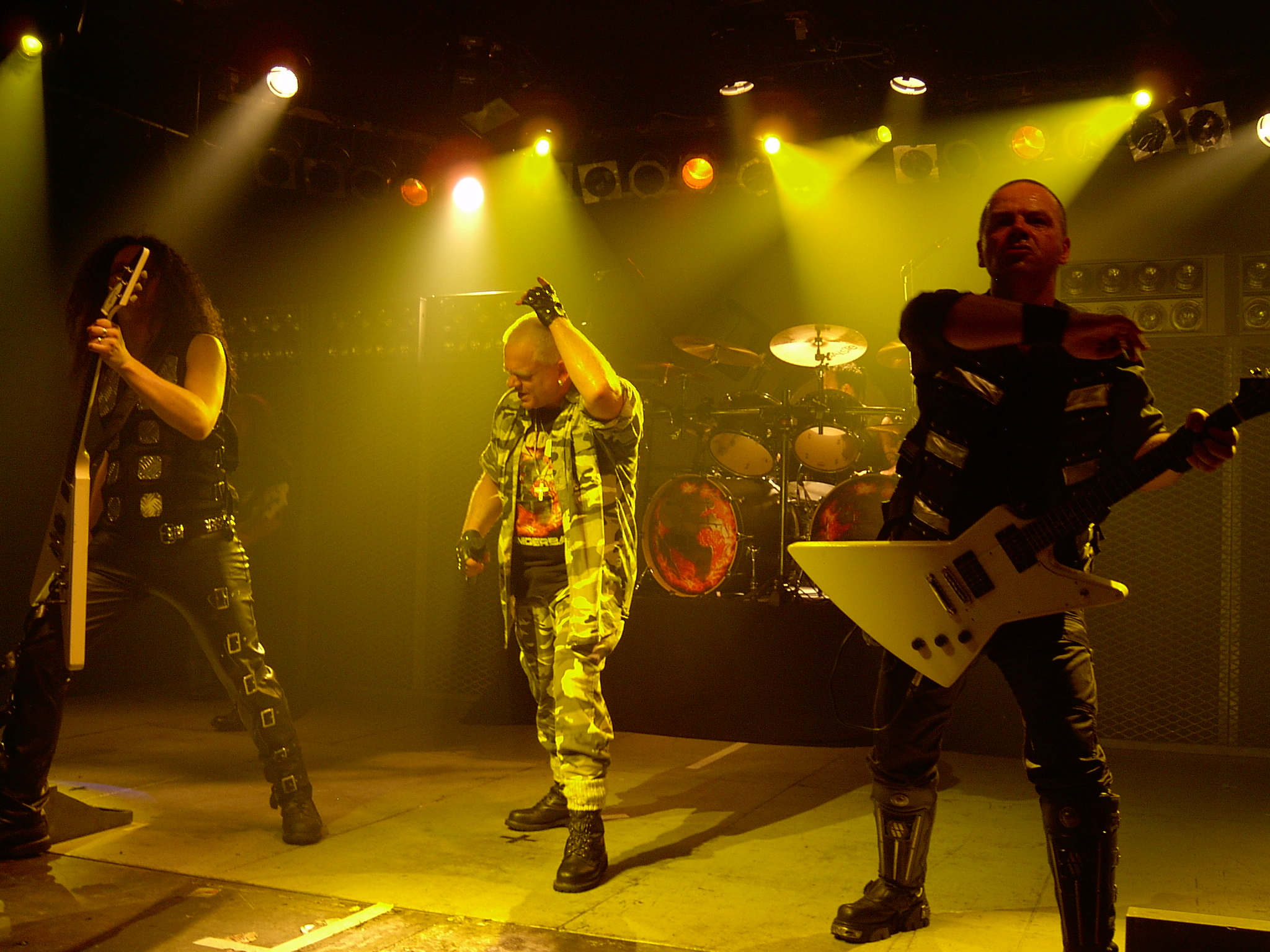
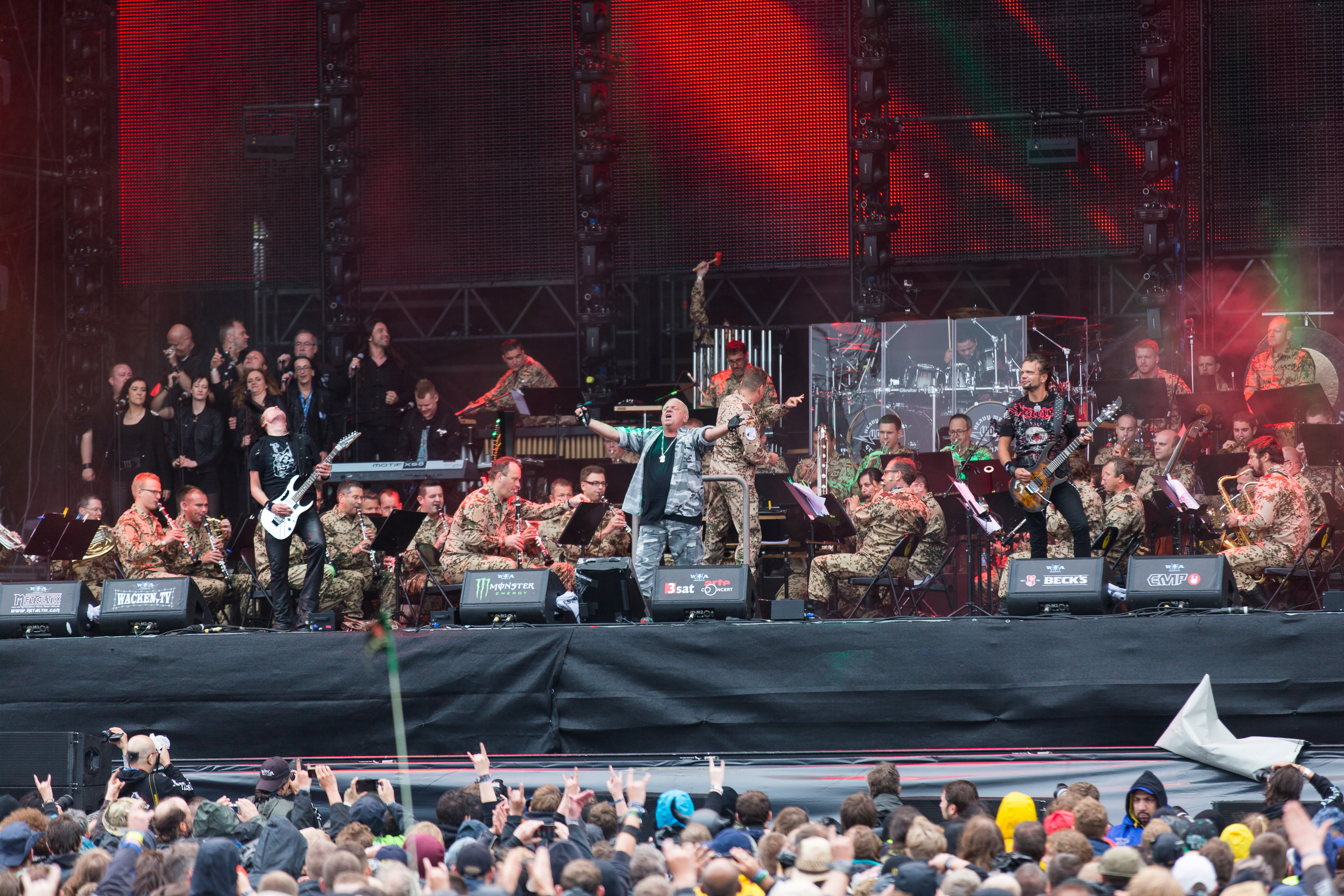
Two lineups of U.D.O. performing in 2004 (top) and 2015 (bottom).

U.D.O. are a German heavy metal band from Solingen. Formed in 1987 by eponymous vocalist Udo Dirkschneider following his departure from Accept, the group originally included guitarists Mathias Dieth and Peter Szigeti, bassist Frank Rittel and drummer Thomas Franke. The band released their debut album Animal House before the end of the year, after which Szigeti, Rittel and Franke were replaced by Andy Susemihl, Thomas Smuszynski (after a brief tenure for former Accept bassist Dieter Rubach) and future Accept drummer Stefan Schwarzmann, respectively. Wolla Böhm replaced Susemihl for 1990's Faceless World, although by the time of the next album Timebomb, U.D.O. were a four-piece. In 1992, after touring in promotion of Timebomb, U.D.O. disbanded as Dirkschneider returned to the reformed Accept.

Dirkschneider reformed U.D.O. in 1996 with Dieth and Schwarzmann, plus former Accept drummer Stefan Kaufmann on guitar and Michael Voss on bass, to record "Metal Gods" for A Tribute to Judas Priest: Legends of Metal. Dieth and Voss were soon replaced by Bullet members Jürgen Graf and Fitty Wienhold, respectively, for the band's next album Solid. Schwarzmann left after the release of No Limits. Graf also left around the same time, with Igor Gianola taking his place in time for the recording of Holy. Drums on the album were credited to "Guess Who", but were likely programmed by Kaufmann who did the same on earlier albums.

Schwarzmann's replacement was Lorenzo Milani, who joined U.D.O. in November 1999. Milani remained until January 2005, when he left the band for "personal reasons" and was replaced by Francesco Jovino, who had earlier filled in for the regular drummer during a tour the previous autumn. This lineup remained stable for over seven years, before Kaufmann left in September 2012 for "health reasons". He was replaced the following January by Andrey Smirnov, just days before Gianola was also replaced by Kasperi Heikkinen. Jovino left for "personal reasons" in December 2014, with Dirkschneider's son Sven taking his place the following February. Heikkinen remained until February 2017 before leaving, also citing "personal reasons" for his departure from both U.D.O. and related band Dirkschneider.

Bill Hudson took over from Heikkinen in March 2017, but by the following April had left due to musical differences. The band were temporarily rejoined by Kaufmann for a string of summer festival appearances. Shortly after the release of Steelfactory, long-time bassist Fitty Wienhold announced his departure from U.D.O., but assured fans that he would continue to offer his support in the form of songwriting if requested. The following month, the band announced the additions of guitarist Dee Dammers in place of Hudson, and bassist Tilen Hudrap in place of Wienhold. In September 2022 Hudrap was replaced by former Accept bassist Peter Baltes, first on a temporary basis until April 2023 when Baltes officially replaced him.

In October 2025, Andrey Smirnov parted ways with the band. He was replaced by Alen Brentini.

== Members ==
=== Current ===
Image	Name	Years active	Instruments	Release contributions
	Udo Dirkschneider	1987–1992; 1996–present	vocals	all releases
	Sven Dirkschneider	2015–present	drums; backing vocals	all releases from Steelfactory (2018) onwards
	Dee Dammers	2018–present	guitars; backing vocals	Game Over (2021); Touchdown (2023)
	Peter Baltes	2023–present	bass; backing vocals	Touchdown (2023)
	Alen Brentini	2025–present	guitars; backing vocals	none to date

=== Former ===
Image	Name	Years active	Instruments	Release contributions
	Mathias Dieth	1987–1992; 1996	guitars; backing vocals	all releases from Animal House (1987) to "Metal Gods" (1996); No Limits (1998) – guest appearance on one track only; Mission No. X (2005) – guest appearance on one track only; Dominator (2009) – guest appearance on one track only
	Thomas Franke	1987–1988	drums	Animal House (1987)
	Peter Szigeti	1987–1988	guitars	Animal House (1987)
	Frank Rittel	1987–1988	bass	Animal House (1987)
	Stefan Schwarzmann	1988–1992; 1996–1998	drums	all releases from Mean Machine (1989) to No Limits (1998)
	Andy Susemihl	1988–1990; 1991	guitars	Mean Machine (1989)
	Dieter Rubach	1988	bass	none
	Thomas Smuszynski	1988–1992	bass	Mean Machine (1989); Faceless World (1990); Timebomb (1991)
	Wolla Böhm	1989–1990	guitars	Faceless World (1990)
	Frank Fricke	1991–1992	guitars	none
	Stefan Kaufmann	1996–2012 (touring 2018)	guitars; backing vocals	all releases from "Metal Gods" (1996) to Live in Sofia (2012)
	Michael Voss	1996	bass; backing vocals	"Metal Gods" (1996)
	Fitty Wienhold	1996–2018	bass; backing vocals	all releases from Solid (1997) to Steelfactory (2018)
	Jürgen Graf	1996–1998	guitars; backing vocals	Solid (1997); No Limits (1998)
	Igor Gianola	1998–2013	guitars; backing vocals	all releases from Holy (1999) to Live in Sofia (2012)
	Lorenzo Milani	1999–2005	drums	all releases from Live from Russia (2001) to Thunderball (2004)
	Francesco Jovino	2005–2014 (touring 2004)	drums	all releases from Mission No. X (2005) to Navy Metal Night (2015)
	Andrey Smirnov	2013–2025	guitars; backing vocals	all releases from Steelhammer (2013) to Touchdown (2023)
	Kasperi Heikkinen	2013–2017	guitars	all releases from Steelhammer (2013) to Navy Metal Night (2015)
	Bill Hudson	2017–2018	guitars	none
	Tilen Hudrap	2018–2022	bass; backing vocals	Game Over (2021)

=== Touring ===
Image	Name	Years active	Instruments	Release contributions
	Winfred Clifton	1999	keyboards	none
	Marcus Bielenberg	2007 (substitute)	bass	none – Bielenberg substituted for Fitty Wienhold, who was unable to perform due to "private reasons"
	Ulli Köllner	2013–2015	keyboards	Steelhammer: Live from Moscow (2014)
	Harrison Young	2015–2018	keyboards	none

== Lineups ==
Period	Members	Releases
1987–1988	Udo Dirkschneider – lead vocals; Mathias Dieth – guitars, backing vocals; Peter Szigeti – guitars; Frank Rittel – bass; Thomas Franke – drums	Animal House (1987)
1988	Udo Dirkschneider – lead vocals; Mathias Dieth – guitars, backing vocals; Andy Susemihl – guitars; Dieter Rubach – bass; Stefan Schwarzmann – drums	none
1988–1989	Udo Dirkschneider – lead vocals; Mathias Dieth – guitars, backing vocals; Andy Susemihl – guitars; Thomas Smuszynski – bass; Stefan Schwarzmann – drums	Mean Machine (1989)
1989–1990	Udo Dirkschneider – lead vocals; Mathias Dieth – guitars, backing vocals; Wolla Böhm – guitars; Thomas Smuszynski – bass; Stefan Schwarzmann – drums	Faceless World (1990)
1990–1991	Udo Dirkschneider – lead vocals; Mathias Dieth – guitars, backing vocals; Stefan Schwarzmann – drums; Thomas Smuszynski – bass	Timebomb (1991)
1991–1992	Udo Dirkschneider – lead vocals; Mathias Dieth – guitars, backing vocals; Frank Fricke – guitars; Thomas Smuszynski – bass; Stefan Schwarzmann – drums	none
Band inactive 1992–1996
1996	Udo Dirkschneider – lead vocals; Mathias Dieth – guitars; Stefan Kaufmann – guitars, backing vocals; Michael Voss – bass; Stefan Schwarzmann – drums	"Metal Gods" (1996)
1996–1998	Udo Dirkschneider – lead vocals; Jürgen Graf – guitars, backing vocals; Stefan Kaufmann – guitars, backing vocals; Fitty Wienhold – bass, backing vocals; Stefan Schwarzmann – drums	Solid (1997); No Limits (1998)
1998–1999	Udo Dirkschneider – lead vocals; Igor Gianola – guitars, backing vocals; Stefan Kaufmann – guitars, backing vocals; Fitty Wienhold – bass, backing vocals	Holy (1999)
November 1999 – January 2005	Udo Dirkschneider – lead vocals; Igor Gianola – guitars, backing vocals; Stefan Kaufmann – guitars, backing vocals; Fitty Wienhold – bass, backing vocals; Lorenzo Milani – drums	Live from Russia (2001); Man and Machine (2002); Nailed to Metal (2003); Thunderball (2004)
January 2005 – September 2012	Udo Dirkschneider – lead vocals; Igor Gianola – guitars, backing vocals; Stefan Kaufmann – guitars, backing vocals; Fitty Wienhold – bass, backing vocals; Francesco Jovino – drums	Mission No. X (2005); Mastercutor (2007); Mastercutor Alive (2008); Dominator (2009); Rev-Raptor (2011); Live in Sofia (2012)
January 2013	Udo Dirkschneider – lead vocals; Igor Gianola – guitars, backing vocals; Andrey Smirnov – guitars, backing vocals; Fitty Wienhold – bass, backing vocals; Francesco Jovino – drums	none
January 2013 – December 2014	Udo Dirkschneider – lead vocals; Kasperi Heikkinen – guitars; Andrey Smirnov – guitars, backing vocals; Fitty Wienhold – bass, backing vocals; Francesco Jovino – drums	Steelhammer (2013); Steelhammer: Live from Moscow (2014); Decadent (2015); Navy Metal Night (2015)
February 2015 – February 2017	Udo Dirkschneider – lead vocals; Kasperi Heikkinen – guitars; Andrey Smirnov – guitars, backing vocals; Fitty Wienhold – bass, backing vocals; Sven Dirkschneider – drums, backing vocals	none
March 2017 – April 2018	Udo Dirkschneider – lead vocals; Bill Hudson – guitars; Andrey Smirnov – guitars, backing vocals; Fitty Wienhold – bass, backing vocals; Sven Dirkschneider – drums, backing vocals	none
April – September 2018	Udo Dirkschneider – lead vocals; Andrey Smirnov – guitars, backing vocalsFitty Wienhold – bass, backing vocals; Sven Dirkschneider – drums, backing vocals	Steelfactory (2018)
October 2018 – December 2022	Udo Dirkschneider – lead vocals; Dee Dammers – guitars, backing vocals; Andrey Smirnov – guitars, backing vocals; Tilen Hudrap – bass, backing vocals; Sven Dirkschneider – drums, backing vocals	Game Over (2021)
April 2023 – October 2025	Udo Dirkschneider – lead vocals; Dee Dammers – guitars, backing vocals; Andrey Smirnov – guitars, backing vocals; Peter Baltes – bass, backing vocals; Sven Dirkschneider – drums, backing vocals	Touchdown (2023)
October 2025 – present	Udo Dirkschneider – lead vocals; Dee Dammers – guitars, backing vocals; Alen Brentini – guitars, backing vocals; Peter Baltes – bass, backing vocals; Sven Dirkschneider – drums, backing vocals	none to date
