= U.D.O. discography =

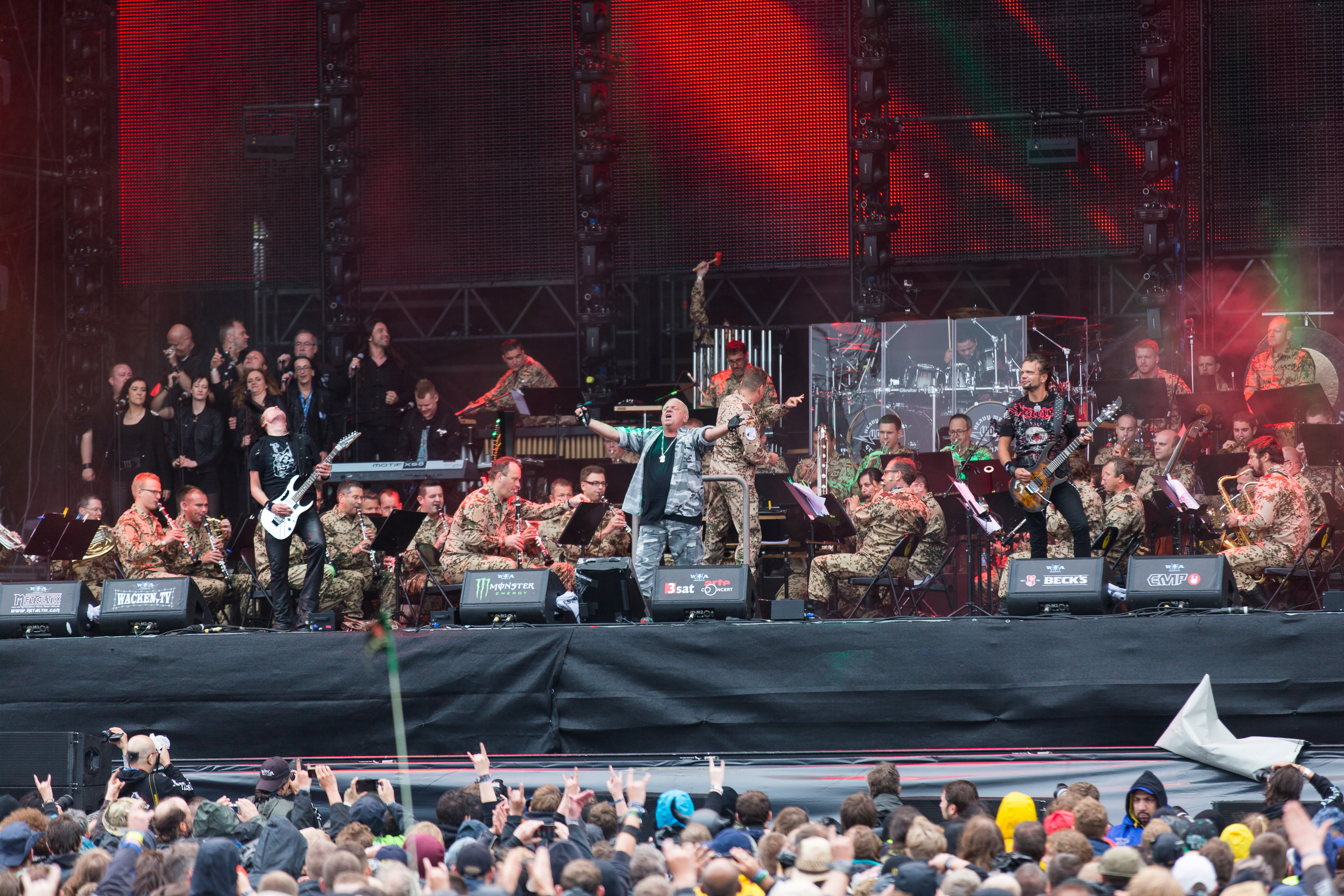
- U.D.O. performing live in 2015.
- Studio albums: 19
- Live albums: 6
- Compilation albums: 3
- Singles: 17
- Video albums: 6
- Music videos: 19

The discography of U.D.O., a German heavy metal band, consists of 19 studio albums, six live albums, three compilations, 17 singles, six video albums and 19 music videos. Formed in 1987 by eponymous vocalist Udo Dirkschneider following his departure from Accept, the group originally included guitarists Mathias Dieth and Peter Szigeti, bassist Frank Rittel and drummer Thomas Franke. Shortly after the release and promotion of their debut album Animal House, Dirkschneider dismissed all band members except Dieth, and rebuilt the group with guitarist Andy Susemihl, bassist Thomas Smuszynski, and future Accept drummer Stefan Schwarzmann. Mean Machine, released in 1989, reached number 31 on the German Albums Chart. Susemihl was subsequently replaced by Wolla Böhm.

1990's Faceless World reached number 52 on the German Albums Chart. The next year's follow-up, Timebomb, failed to chart and was the last album to be released before Dirkschneider's return to Accept. U.D.O. reformed in 1997 with the album Solid, with Dirkschneider and Schwarzmann joined by former Accept drummer Stefan Kaufmann on guitar, alongside second guitarist Jürgen Graf and bassist Fitty Wienhold. The group's next release, No Limits, saw them return to the charts in Germany at number 90. With Graf and Schwarzmann replaced by Igor Gianola and Lorenzo Milani, respectively, Holy also broke into the German top 100. The band continued to make their way slowly up the albums chart, as Man and Machine reached number 71, and Thunderball reached number 83.

Francesco Jovino replaced Milani in time for Mission No. X, which reached number 92 in the band's home country. The group broke into the German top 40 for the first time since 1989 with their next release, peaking at number 32 with Mastercutor in 2007. Subsequent releases improved on this form – 2009's Dominator was the band's first top 30 album, and 2011's Rev-Raptor was their first top 20. Both guitarists had left by the time Steelhammer was released in 2013, to be replaced by Andrey Smirnov and Kasperi Heikkinen. The album reached number 21 in Germany and also registered on the US Billboard Heatseekers Albums chart at number 28. 2015's Decadent reached a new band record of number 16 in Germany, while the live album Navy Metal Night charted at number 31.

U.D.O. released Steelfactory in 2018, which was the first album to feature Dirkschneider's son Sven on drums, and the first since Heikkinen's departure. The album was the band's first to reach the German Albums Chart top 10, peaking at number 7. It also reached number 27 on the UK Rock & Metal Albums Chart, and number 9 on the Billboard Heatseekers Albums chart.

== Albums ==
=== Studio albums ===
List of studio albums, with selected chart positions
Title	Album details	Peak chart positions									
Title	Album details	GER	AUT	BEL Wal.	ESP	FIN	NOR	SWE	SWI	UK Rock	US Heat
Animal House	Released: 3 November 1987; Label: RCA; Formats: CD, LP, CS	—	—	—	—	—	—	41	—	—	—
Mean Machine	Released: 10 January 1989; Label: RCA; Formats: CD, LP, CS	31	—	—	—	—	—	—	—	—	—
Faceless World	Released: 25 February 1990; Label: RCA; Formats: CD, LP, CS	52	—	—	—	—	—	37	—	—	—
Timebomb	Released: 13 April 1991; Label: RCA; Formats: CD, LP, CS	—	—	—	—	—	—	—	—	—	—
Solid	Released: 24 March 1997; Label: GUN; Formats: CD, CS	—	—	—	—	—	—	—	—	—	—
No Limits	Released: 20 April 1998; Label: GUN; Formats: CD, CS	90	—	—	—	—	—	—	—	—	—
Holy	Released: 18 October 1999; Label: Nuclear Blast; Formats: CD, LP, CS	96	—	—	—	—	—	—	—	—	—
Man and Machine	Released: 24 July 2002; Label: Breaker; Formats: CD, CS	71	—	—	—	—	—	—	—	—	—
Thunderball	Released: 29 March 2004; Label: AFM; Format: CD	83	—	—	—	—	—	47	—	—	—
Mission No. X	Released: 30 September 2005; Label: AFM; Format: CD	92	—	—	—	—	—	—	—	—	—
Mastercutor	Released: 18 May 2007; Label: AFM; Format: CD	39	—	—	—	—	—	—	—	—	—
Dominator	Released: 21 August 2009; Label: AFM; Formats: CD, LP, DL	27	—	—	—	35	—	51	100	—	—
Rev-Raptor	Released: 20 May 2011; Label: AFM; Formats: CD, LP, DL	20	—	—	—	—	—	26	57	—	—
Steelhammer	Released: 21 May 2013; Label: AFM; Formats: CD, 2LP, DL	21	—	—	—	38	—	23	79	—	28
Decadent	Released: 23 January 2015; Label: AFM; Formats: CD, 2LP, DL	16	—	—	—	34	—	—	48	—	—
Steelfactory	Released: 31 August 2018; Label: AFM; Formats: CD, 2LP, DL	7	23	135	81	—	33	19	24	27	9
We Are One (with Das Musikkorps Der Bundeswehr)	Released: 20 July 2020; Label: AFM; Formats: CD, 2LP	8	—	—	—	—	—	5	—	—	—
Game Over	Released: 22 October 2021; Label: AFM; Formats: CD	13	39	—	—	25	—	—	16	—	—
Touchdown	Released: 25 August 2023; Label: AFM; Formats: CD	4	33	160	—	34	—	17	8	—	—
"—" denotes a release that did not chart or was not issued in that region.

=== Live albums ===
List of live albums, with selected chart position
Title	Album details	Peak
Title	Album details	GER
Live from Russia	Released: 15 October 2001; Label: Breaker; Format: 2CD	—
Nailed to Metal: The Missing Tracks	Released: 21 October 2003; Label: AFM; Format: CD	100
Mastercutor Alive	Released: 6 October 2008; Label: ZYX, Metal Mind; Formats: 2CD, DL	—
Live in Sofia	Released: 13 November 2012; Label: AFM; Formats: 2CD, 3LP, DL	75
Steelhammer: Live from Moscow	Released: 10 June 2014; Label: AFM; Formats: 2CD, 3LP, DL	60
Navy Metal Night (with the Marinemusikkorps Nordsee)	Released: 31 July 2015; Label: AFM; Formats: 2CD, 2LP, DL	31
Live in Bulgaria 2020 – Pandemic Survival Show	Released: 19 March 2021; Label: AFM; Format: CD, LP, DL	—
"—" denotes a release that did not chart or was not issued in that region.

=== Compilations ===
List of compilation albums, with selected chart positions
Title	Album details	Peaks	
Title	Album details	GER	SWE
Best Of	Released: 13 September 1999; Label: GUN; Format: CD	—	—
Metallized: Best of U.D.O.	Released: 3 December 2007; Label: AFM; Format: CD	—	—
Celebrator: Rare Tracks	Released: 4 May 2012; Label: AFM; Formats: 2CD, 2LP, DL	73	55
"—" denotes a release that did not chart or was not issued in that region.

== Singles ==
List of singles, showing year released and album name
Title	Year	Peak	Album
Title	Year	GER	Album
"They Want War"	1988	—	Animal House
"Heart of Gold"	1990	—	Faceless World
"Faceless World"	1990	—	Faceless World
"Two Faced Woman"	1997	—	Solid
"Independence Day"	1997	—	Solid
"Lovemachine"	1998	—	No Limits
"Dancing with an Angel"	2002	—	Man and Machine
"24/7"	2005	82	Mission No. X
"The Wrong Side of Midnight"	2007	—	Mastercutor
"Infected"	2009	—	Dominator
"Leatherhead"	2011	—	Rev-Raptor
"Metal Machine"	2013	—	Steelhammer
"Steelhammer"	2013	—	Steelhammer
"Decadent"	2014	—	Decadent
"Rising High"	2018	—	Steelfactory
"One Heart One Soul"	2018	—	Steelfactory
"Make the Move"	2018	—	Steelfactory

== Videos ==
=== Video albums ===
List of video albums
Title	Album details
Nailed to Metal: The Complete History	Released: 21 October 2003; Label: AFM; Format: DVD
Thundervision	Released: 29 March 2004; Label: AFM; Format: DVD
Mastercutor Alive	Released: 26 September 2008; Label: ZYX, Golden Core; Format: 2DVD
Live in Sofia	Released: 13 November 2012; Label: Eagle Vision; Formats: DVD, Blu-ray
Steelhammer: Live from Moscow	Released: 10 June 2014; Label: AFM; Formats: DVD, BD
Navy Metal Night (with the Marinemusikkorps Nordsee)	Released: 31 July 2015; Label: AFM; Formats: DVD, BD
Live in Bulgaria 2020 – Pandemic Survival Show	Released: 19 March 2021; Label: AFM; Formats: DVD, BD

=== Music videos ===
List of music videos, showing year released
Title	Year
"They Want War"	1988
"Go Back to Hell"	1988
"Break the Rules"	1989
"Heart of Gold"	1990
"Independence Day"	1997
"Dancing with an Angel"	2002
"Thunderball"	2004
"The Arbiter"	2004
"Trainride in Russia"	2004
"Blind Eyes"	2004
"Mean Streets"	2005
"The Wrong Side of Midnight"	2007
"Black and White"	2009
"Leatherhead"	2011
"I Give as Good as I Get"	2011
"Metal Machine"	2013
"Heavy Rain"	2013
"Decadent"	2014
"One Heart One Soul"	2018
"Metal Never Dies"	2021
"Prophecy"	2021
