= Holy (disambiguation) =

Holy is a synonym for sacred.

Holy or Holiness may also refer to:

- Holiness movement, a specific tradition within Christianity that teaches the doctrine of entire sanctification
- Holiness, a teaching also known as Christian perfection or entire sanctification
- Holiness (style), a pre-nominal honorific used for the leaders of several religious groups
- Holiness code, found in the Bible at Leviticus 17–26

== People ==
- Holý, a Czech surname
- Mirela Holy, a Croatian politician

== Books ==
- The Holy, a novel by Daniel Quinn
- "Holy" (short story), a short story by Orson Scott Card

== Television ==
- "Holy" (Bottom), an episode of the British sitcom Bottom
- "Holy...", an exclamation by Robin, originating from the Batman 1966 television series

== Music ==
- Holy (In Strict Confidence album)
- Holy (U.D.O. album)
- "Holy Holy", a 1971 song by David Bowie
- "(One Glance Is) Holy", a 1989 song by Mike Oldfield
- "Holy" (Justin Bieber song), a 2020 song by Justin Bieber featuring Chance the Rapper.
- "Holy", a 2017 song by Kayzo and Slander from Dilapidation Celebration
- "Holy", a 2014 song by Pvris from White Noise
- "H.O.L.Y.", a 2016 song by Florida Georgia Line
- "Holy...", a 1997 song by Sadist from Crust
- "THE HOLY", a 2018 track by Toby Fox from Deltarune Chapter 1 OST from the video game Deltarune
- "Holy", a 2025 song by Mac DeMarco from Guitar

== See also ==
- Holi (disambiguation)
- Holy of Holies (disambiguation)
- List of people known as the Holy
- Q-D-Š, a Semitic triconsonantal root meaning "holy"
