= Bad Steve =

- Genres: Heavy metal, Hard rock
- Years active: 1983–1987
- Label: Mausoleum Records
- Past members: Dieter Rubach; Jan Koemmet; Frank Friedrich; Accu Becker; Phillip Magoo

Bad Steve was a West German heavy metal band, composed of former Accept members Jan Koemmet, Frank Friedrich and Dieter Rubach, as well as former members of more obscure bands Kanaan and Sin City. They supported Accept on a 1984 tour in West Germany. Rubach later had a brief stint with Accept vocalist Udo Dirkschneider's band U.D.O. Koemmet had been with Accept previous to their recording career and re-entered that band briefly between their releases Breaker and Restless and Wild.

== Discography ==
Bad Steve made one release, the 1985 album Killing the Night on Mausoleum Records.

=== Killing the Night (Mausoleum Records 1985) ===
==== Track listing ====
1. "Bad Steve is Coming"
2. "Light up my Soul"
3. "Killing the Night"
4. "Running to You"
5. "Inside Looking Out"
6. "Across the Rainbow"
7. "Living on the Frontline"
8. "Leather Girl"
9. "Nightbreaker"

==== Credits ====
- Phillip Magoo (ex-Sin City) - vocals
- Jan Koemmet (ex-Accept) - guitar
- Accu Becker (ex-Kanaan) - guitar
- Dieter Rubach (ex-Accept) - bass
- Frank Friedrich (ex-Accept) - drums
