= Steelhammer =

Studio album by U.D.O.
- Released: 24 May 2013
- Recorded: 2012
- Studios: Roxx Studio, Pulheim, Germany
- Genre: Heavy metal
- Length: 1:01:32
- Label: AFM
- Producers: Udo Dirkschneider, Fitty Wienhold

U.D.O. chronology
Rev-Raptor (2011)	Steelhammer (2013)	Decadent (2015)

Professional ratings
Review scores
Source	Rating
BW&BK	8.5/10 stars
Jukebox:Metal	4/5 stars
Music Enthusiast magazine	(positive)

Steelhammer is the 14th studio album by German heavy metal band U.D.O., released on 24 May 2013 via AFM Records. It is the first album with guitarist Andrey Smirnov. Second guitarist Kasperi Heikkinen joined the band after all recordings were completed. It is also the first album without Stefan Kaufmann as guitarist since the 1997 album Solid, as well as the first without guitarist Igor Gianola since the 1999 album Holy. Steelhammer charted at #21 in Germany, #23 in Sweden, #38 in Finland and #67 in Norway during its first week. Music videos were made for "Metal Machine" and "Heavy Rain".

== Track listing ==
No.	Title	Length
1.	"Steelhammer"	3:23
2.	"A Cry of a Nation"	5:41
3.	"Metal Machine"	4:46
4.	"Basta Ya"	4:33
5.	"Heavy Rain"	2:25
6.	"Devil's Bite"	5:05
7.	"Death Ride"	4:08
8.	"King of Mean"	4:07
9.	"Timekeeper"	4:26
10.	"Never Cross My Way"	4:23
11.	"Take My Medicine"	5:07
12.	"Stay True"	4:04
13.	"When Love Becomes a Lie"	4:12
14.	"Book of Faith"	5:12

Limited Edition Bonus Track
No.	Title	Length
1.	"Shadows Come Alive"	4:24
Total length:		1:05:56

Japanese Bonus Track
No.	Title	Length
1.	"Dust and Rust" ("Basta Ya" English Version)	4:31
Total length:		1:06:03

Note

- The digital version of the album omits "King of Mean" and "Never Cross My Way"

== Personnel ==
- Udo Dirkschneider – vocals
- Andrey Smirnov – guitars
- Fitty Wienhold – bass
- Francesco Jovino – drums

Guest musicians

- Víctor García González – additional vocals on "Basta Ya"
- Sascha Onnen – piano on "Heavy Rain"
- Frank Knight – spoken words on "A Cry of a Nation"
- Claus Fischer – vocals (choirs)
- Ingmar Viertel – vocals (choirs)
- Bernhard Müssig – vocals (choirs)
- Claus Rettkowski – vocals (choirs)
- Holger Thielbörger – vocals (choirs)

Production

- Udo Dirkschneider – producer, mixing
- Fitty Wienhold – producer
- Dirk Hüttner – artwork, design
- Holger Thielbörger – editing
- Martin Häusler – photography
- Martin Pfeiffer – mixing
- Tim Eckhorst – layout, booklet
- Markus Teske – orchestral arrangement on "Book of Faith", editing, mastering
- Patrick Spina – engineering (drums), editing (drums)
- Víctor García González – lyrics, translation on "Basta Ya"
