= Animal House (disambiguation) =

National Lampoon's Animal House is a 1978 comedy film.

Animal House may also refer to:

== Music ==
- Animal House (Angie Martinez album), with the song of the same name
- Animal House (U.D.O. album)
- "Animal House", a song from the 1984 album Walkin' the Razor's Edge by Helix

== Television ==
- "Animal House", an episode of the BBC's Natural World
  - "The Animal House", the same episode as part of the PBS series Nature
- "Animal House", a season 5 episode of The Loud House

== See also ==
- The Real Animal House: The Awesomely Depraved Saga of the Fraternity That Inspired the Movie, a memoir by Chris Miller
- Delta House, a TV series based on the 1978 film
