= Sanctum =

Sanctum may refer to:

== Arts and entertainment ==
- Sanctum (band), a Swedish electronic and industrial music band
- Sanctum (film), a 2011 Australian-American action-thriller film
- Sanctum (1998 video game), a digital collectible card game
- Sanctum (2011 video game), a first-person shooter tower defense video game

== Other uses ==
- Sanctum Inc., an American information technology company

== See also ==
- Sanctum sanctorum (disambiguation)
