= Holy of Holies (disambiguation) =

The Holy of Holies is a term in the Hebrew Bible that refers to the inner sanctuary of the Tabernacle.

Holy of Holies may also refer to:

- Holy of Holies (LDS Church), a room in the Salt Lake Temple of the Church of Jesus Christ of Latter-day Saints
- Well of Souls, a partly natural, partly man-made cave located inside the Foundation Stone under the Dome of the Rock on the Temple Mount in Jerusalem

== See also ==
- Holy (disambiguation)
- Sanctum sanctorum (disambiguation)
