= Sanctorum =

Sanctorum may refer to:

- Sanctórum de Lázaro Cárdenas, a minicipality in the Mexican state of Tlaxcala
- Sanctum sanctorum, a Latin phrase meaning "Holy of Holies"
- Sortes Sanctorum, a late antique text that was used for divination by means of dice

== See also ==
- Sanctum sanctorum (disambiguation)
