= Andy Susemihl =

- Born: Ulm, West Germany
- Genres: Hard rock; heavy metal
- Occupations: Musician; songwriter
- Instruments: Guitar; vocals
- Years active: 1986–present
- Website: andysusemihl.com

Andy Susemihl is a German guitarist, singer, songwriter and record producer. He began his career in the 1980s and gained international success since 1987 in hard rock bands such as U.D.O. and Sinner.

== Life and career ==
Born and raised in Germany, he first learned guitar at the age of 12 and started to play local clubs. As a well-respected guitar player, he was asked to join the heavy metal band Sinner in 1987 to record their 6th album Dangerous Charm. The album was followed by a large European tour. When former Accept-singer Udo Dirkschneider formed his new band U.D.O., he asked Susemihl to join the band, as well as Dieter Rubach (formerly of Accept), Sinner guitarist Mathias Dieth and drummer Thomas Franke, for their Animal House tour.

They soon started a US-Tour, which also included Zodiac Mindwarp, Lita Ford and Guns N' Roses, before they recorded their next album Mean Machine. This album, released in 1989 through BMG/Ariola, was produced by Mark Dodson, who also produced Anthrax and Suicidal Tendencies. The album sold 250,000 units worldwide, earning the band the opportunity to play on all the European dates of Ozzy Osbourne's "No Rest for the Wicked" tour.

Following that tour, Susemihl felt a wind of change fanning his creativity. In 1990, Polydor approached him to lay down two tracks for a compilation CD, titled "Guitar Ballads" and featured respected guitarists Steve Vai, Joe Satriani, Michael Schenker, Gary Moore and Steve Stevens. On the CD, Susemihl wrote, composed and performed two rock-oriented tracks, "Cloud Nine" and "Alley Cat".

Since 1990, Susemihl has produced, recorded and played with a variety of multifaceted groups and artists, including, Lazy and Angel Heart. In 1993, he recorded several tracks on Sinner's "No more Alibis" album (Mausoleum Records/MMS). Later that year, he recorded the CD, "Fasten Seat Belts" with the band Mr. Perfect (Long Island Records/On Air), which became a big hit in Japan. Recent noteworthy jams at various trade shows have included performances with Dann Huff (a studio musician appearing on albums by Madonna and Michael Jackson), Bonfire's Angel Schleifer and Peter Baltes of Accept.

In 1994, Susemihl relocated to Los Angeles, California, and in early 1995 he recorded "Life among the Roaches" (Voices/Gun Attack). Since his move to L.A., Susemihl was involved in many local as well as international projects. His credits over the last years include studio sessions with artists and producers such as Richie Kotzen (Poison/Mr. Big), Eddie Kramer (Jimi Hendrix) and Shay Baby (Ozzy Osbourne/Warrant). In 2000 he started to record the 7-9-7 debut Get me to the World on Time. The same titled single was mixed by Rob Jacobs (Alanis Morissette, U2, The Eagles). The album eventually hit the stores in 2006.

On 2 August 2012 he performed as a special guest on U.D.O.'s show at the Wacken Open Air, Germany. Other guests during the show were Mr. Lordi and Doro Pesch.

In 2013, Susemihl released his new solo album and is playing live with his trio "Supermihl & Superfriends" and ex-Pur member Roland Bless, supporting Unheilig on their open air tour.

== Discography ==
- 1987 – Sinner – Dangerous Charm
- 1989 – U.D.O. – Mean Machine
- 1990 – Mr. Perfect – Fasten Seat Belts
- 1991 – Sinner – No More Alibis
- 1991 – APE – Human Greed
- 1995 – Andy Susemihl – Life Among The Roaches
- 1996 – Miracle Mile – To Burn Together
- 1997 – Miracle Mile – EP
- 1998 – Miracle Mile – From the Journal of Mr. Black
- 2000 – The Burbanks – Ready, Fire, Aim
- 2000 – Human Drama – The Best of Human Drama...In a Perfect World
- 2002 – 7-9-7 – Get Me to the World On Time
- 2007 – Reece – Universal Language
- 2008 – Andy Susemihl – King & The Giant
- 2008 – Andy Susemihl – Supermihl & Superfriends
- 2009 – Rock & Rollinger – Rollst Du Noch Oder Rockst Du Schon?
- 2010 – Rock & Rollinger – Weihnachtsalbum
- 2010 – Bangalore Choir – Cadence
- 2011 – Rock & Rollinger – Eloquient Dreiwilds
- 2012 – Bangalore Choir – Metaphor
- 2013 – Andy Susemihl – Supermihl & Superfriends Vol. 2
- 2014 - Andy Susemihl - L.A. Sessions '96-'98
- 2014 - Andy Susemihl - L.A. Sessions '98-'02
- 2017 – Andy Susemihl – Alles Wird Gut !
- 2018 - Andy Susemihl - Elevation
- 2020 - Andy Susemhil - Burning Man (EP)
- 2021 - Andy Susemhil - Alienation
- 2022 - Andy Susemhil - Rapture

=== Others ===
- 1990 – Guitar Ballads (Polydor Compilation)
