= Jan Koemmet =

- Born: 18 August 1961 (age 64)
- Genres: Hard rock, Heavy metal
- Occupations: Musician, Designer
- Instrument: Guitar
- Website: www.liontwin.com

Jan Koemmet (born 18 August 1961) is a German guitar player and an international designer. He joined the heavy metal group Accept between their albums Breaker and Restless and Wild. He was preceded by Jörg Fischer and succeeded by Herman Frank. After his departure from Accept, he formed Bad Steve with other past members of Accept, Frank Friedrich and Dieter Rubach. From 1989 to 1992 Jan Koemmet was the guitar-player in the Orchester of the Starlight Express in Bochum, Germany. He studied Design, History of art, Aesthetics and Media Theory by Bazon Brock a German art theorist and critic, multi-media generalist and artist.

Since 2000 Jan Koemmet directs the advertising agency Koemmet Agentur für Kommunikation in Wuppertal, Germany. The agency has been awarded international accolades, and the works have been represented at international design biennial. He taught at the Universities of Düsseldorf, Kassel and Wuppertal, and gave lectures and seminars at the Popakademie Baden-Württemberg. Jan Koemmet is a member of Amnesty International, Greenpeace and PETA. With the female singer Liane Vollmer-Sturm, he formed in spring 2011 the metalpop-duo LION TWIN.
