= Steelfactory =

Studio album by U.D.O.
- Released: 31 August 2018
- Genre: Heavy metal
- Length: 58:05
- Label: AFM
- Producer: Jacob Hansen

U.D.O. chronology
Decadent (2015)	Steelfactory (2018)	Game Over (2021)

Professional ratings
Review scores
Source	Rating
Metal Forces	9/10 stars

Steelfactory is the sixteenth studio album by U.D.O., released on 31 August 2018 by AFM Records. It is the first album to feature Udo Dirkschneider's son Sven as the new drummer. The first single "Rising High" was made available for streaming on 15 June 2018. A music video was made for "One Heart One Soul". A lyric video was made for "Make the Move". Steelfactory is the final album to feature bassist Fitty Wienhold when he announced his departure in September 2018.

== Album Information ==
Udo Dirkschneider says that the musical direction of Steelfactory is influenced by the touring of when the band performed under the name Dirkschneider from 2015 to 2018, during which at the time they only played Accept songs, "it's definitely an influence and also a feeling if you start songwriting. But I don't have a problem with this. [Laughs]"

== Recording and writing ==
U.D.O. started work on the album in March 2017 after performing in North America. The music was composed by all members of the band, as opposed to the albums Steelhammer and Decadent, which was mainly composed by Dirkschneider and bassist Fitty Weinhold. Dirkschneider says that there was not a set goal on what type of sound he wanted to have, "We just start working on a new album and see what's coming up. Sometimes it's a little bit more aggressive; sometimes it's a little bit more melodic; sometimes you put keyboards into that, whatever. This time, I think on the whole album, it's a good mix of songs. We have really fast songs, uptempo songs, mid-tempo songs, ballads, everything." He says that Steelfactory has an influence of Accept.

== Track listing ==
No.	Title	Length
1.	"Tongue Reaper"	4:25
2.	"Make the Move"	4:04
3.	"Keeper of My Soul"	4:02
4.	"In the Heat of the Night"	4:52
5.	"Raise the Game"	4:11
6.	"Blood on Fire"	4:42
7.	"Rising High"	4:09
8.	"Hungry and Angry"	4:36
9.	"One Heart One Soul"	4:56
10.	"A Bite of Evil"	5:10
11.	"Eraser"	4:00
12.	"Rose in the Desert"	4:11
13.	"The Way"	4:47

Limited Edition Bonus Tracks
No.	Title	Length
1.	"The Devil Is an Angel"	4:34
2.	"Pictures in My Dreams"	6:08
Total length:		1:08:47

Japanese Bonus Track
No.	Title	Length
1.	"What a Hell of a Night"	4:07
Total length:		1:02:12

== Personnel ==
- Udo Dirkschneider – vocals
- Andrey Smirnov – guitar
- Fitty Wienhold – bass guitar
- Sven Dirkschneider – drums

Production

- Jacob Hansen – producer, recording (guitars), mixing
- Diego Verhagen – cover art, design (booklet)
- Holger Thielbörger – recording (bass, drums)
- Stefan Kaufmann – recording (vocals)

== Charts ==
Chart (2018)	Peak position
Austrian Albums (Ö3 Austria)	23
Czech Albums (ČNS IFPI)	27
German Albums (Offizielle Top 100)	7
Hungarian Albums (MAHASZ)	39
Norwegian Albums (VG-lista)	33
Swedish Albums (Sverigetopplistan)	19
Swiss Albums (Schweizer Hitparade)	24
