= Sanctum sanctorum (disambiguation) =

Sanctum sanctorum is a Latin phrase literally meaning Holy of Holies.

Sanctum sanctorum may also refer to:

== Religion ==
- Garbhagriha, the innermost sanctuary of Hindu, Jain, and Buddhist temples
- Holy of Holies, a term in the Hebrew Bible that refers to the inner sanctuary of the Tabernacle
- Sancta Sanctorum (Lateran, Rome), a Catholic chapel in Rome featuring the Scala Sancta of the Lateran Palace

== Entertainment ==
- Sanctum Sanctorum (Marvel Comics), a fictional building in the Marvel Universe
- "Sanctum Sanctorum", a song by the Damned from their 1985 album Phantasmagoria

== See also ==
- Holy of Holies (disambiguation)
- Sanctorum (disambiguation)
- Sanctum (disambiguation)
