= Mission No. X =

Studio album by U.D.O.
- Released: 30 September 2005
- Recorded: 2005
- Studios: Roxx Studio, Pulheim, Germany
- Genre: Heavy metal
- Length: 47:14
- Label: AFM
- Producer: Stefan Kaufmann

U.D.O. chronology
Thunderball (2004)	Mission No. X (2005)	Mastercutor (2007)

Professional ratings
Review scores
Source	Rating
AllMusic	2.5/5 stars
Rock Hard	8.0/10

Mission No. X is the tenth studio album by German heavy metal band U.D.O., released on 30 September 2005 via AFM Records. The original release date was announced for 4 October, but was pushed forward by one week.

Drummer Lorenzo Milani left the band due to "personal reasons" after the release of Thunderball and was replaced by Edge of Forever drummer Francesco Jovino.

== Track listing ==
No.	Title	Length
1.	"The Embarkation" (Instrumental)	1:30
2.	"Mission No. X"	4:07
3.	"24/7"	3:57
4.	"Mean Streets"	4:21
5.	"Primecrime on Primetime"	3:56
6.	"Eye of the Eagle"	5:08
7.	"Shell Shock Fever"	3:53
8.	"Stone Hard"	4:21
9.	"Breaking Down the Borders"	3:19
10.	"Cry Soldier Cry"	5:16
11.	"Way of Life"	3:39
12.	"Mad for Crazy"	3:47

Japanese Bonus Track
No.	Title	Length
1.	"Rebellion"	4:39
Total length:		51:53

Notes

- "Way of Life" is a re-recorded version from No Limits
- The CD-Maximum release contains the 24/7 EP
- The Enhanced version contains the "Mean Streets" music video and wallpapers

== Personnel ==
U.D.O.

- Udo Dirkschneider – vocals
- Stefan Kaufmann – guitar, producer, engineer, mixing
- Igor Gianola – guitar
- Fitty Wienhold – bass
- Francesco Jovino – drums

Additional musicians

- Mathias Dieth – solo guitar on "Way of Life"
- Johannes Schiefner – uilleann pipes on "Cry Soldier Cry"

Production

- Manfred Melchior – mastering
- Martin Häusler – cover art, design
- Dirk Schelpmeier – photography
