= Geyen =

- Ortsteil of Pulheim
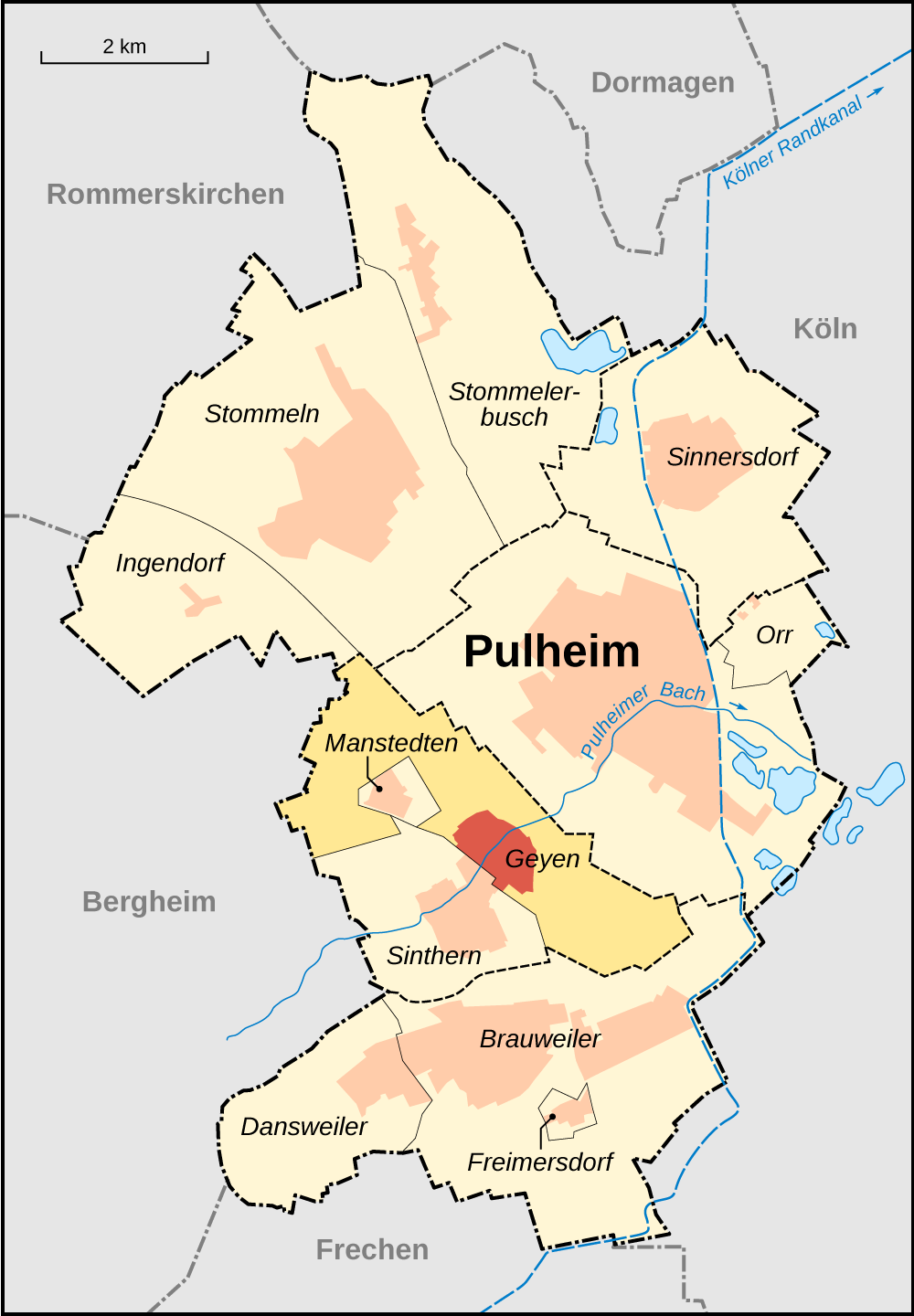
- Location of Geyen within Pulheim
- Interactive map of Geyen
- Location within Germany Location within North Rhine-Westphalia
- Coordinates: 50°58′54″N 6°47′11″E
- Country: Germany
- State: North Rhine-Westphalia
- Admin. region: Köln
- District: Rhein-Erft-Kreis
- Town: Pulheim
- Elevation: 49 m (161 ft)

Population (2021)
  - Total: 2,489
- Time zone: UTC+01:00 (CET)
  - Summer (DST): UTC+02:00 (CEST)
- Postal codes: 50259
- Dialling codes: 02238

Geyen is a village, part of the town Pulheim in the Rhein-Erft-Kreis, North Rhine-Westphalia, Germany.

== Location ==
Geyen is situated at the old road from Pulheim to Brauweiler. Additionally the "Pulheimer Bach", or stream of Pulheim flows through Geyen.

== History ==
Originally Geyen was called villa Gegina in 962 AD.
Politically Geyen belonged to the office of Bergheim and to the duchy of Jülich. 1794 French troops occupied Geyen, which meant it belonged to the Arrondissement de Cologne in the Département de la Roer. After that Geyen came to belong to the Kingdom of Prussia in 1815.
In recent times Geyen belonged to Pulheim (1956), then to Brauweiler (1964) and then since 1975 it belongs to Pulheim again.

== Traffic ==
Today Geyen is avoided by a bypass. The next train station is located in Pulheim, where the B59 road runs through as well. The motorways A57 and A1 are very close by.

== Sights ==
- The castle of Geyen - It is first mentioned in a document of 1337 and 1434 it belonged to the mayor family Judde. Originally it was surrounded completely by water, but now there is only water on one side of it. After it burned in 1664 the castle was rebuilt with bricks in baroque style. This has mainly remained until now.
- The catholic church - It was built 1893 by Theodor Roß in Neo-Gothic style and replaced by a medieval church.
- Chapel
- The stream of Pulheim - Pulheimer Bach - was renatured in 2010 to bring it back into its original style. Now it has been made into an adventure path.

== Education ==
There is one primary school in Geyen, the GSG Sinthern-Geyen. It actually belongs to Sinthern as well, because the school building is on Sinthern grounds and the gym hall is on Geyen grounds. It was built in 1972. There are also two pre-schools, or kindergartens - the Katholischer Kindergarten St. Cornelius and the Kleine Strolche Familienzentrum.
