= Thunderball (U.D.O. album) =

Studio album by U.D.O.
- Released: 29 March 2004
- Recorded: August–December 2003
- Studios: Roxx Studio, Pulheim, Germany
- Genre: Heavy metal
- Length: 45:46
- Label: AFM
- Producer: Stefan Kaufmann

U.D.O. chronology
Man and Machine (2002)	Thunderball (2004)	Mission No. X (2005)

Professional ratings
Review scores
Source	Rating
AllMusic	3.5/5 stars
Rock Hard	8.0/10

Thunderball is the ninth studio album by German heavy metal band U.D.O., released on 29 March 2004 by AFM Records.

The title of the album and Udo Dirkschneider's posture on the cover are allusions to the 1965 film Thunderball.

Music videos were made for "Thunderball" and "Blind Eyes"

== Track listing ==
No.	Title	Length
1.	"Thunderball"	3:53
2.	"The Arbiter"	4:07
3.	"Pull the Trigger"	4:34
4.	"Fistful of Anger"	3:11
5.	"The Land of the Midnight Sun"	5:18
6.	"Hell Bites Back"	3:09
7.	"Trainride in Russia (Poezed po Rossii)"	4:45
8.	"The Bullet and the Bomb"	3:58
9.	"The Magic Mirror"	4:56
10.	"Tough Luck II"	3:36
11.	"Blind Eyes"	4:19

Japanese Bonus Track
No.	Title	Length
12.	"Borderline"	4:12
Total length:		49:58

Disc 2
No.	Title	Length
1.	"Hardcore Lover"	4:44
2.	"Blind Eyes" (Video)	4:22
3.	"Multimedia Extras: Screensaver, Wallpapers"
Total length:		53:46

Note

The CD-Maximum release contains the Thundervision DVD

== Personnel ==
U.D.O.

- Udo Dirkschneider – vocals
- Stefan Kaufmann – guitar, accordion on "Trainride in Russia", producer, engineer, mixing
- Igor Gianola – guitar
- Fitty Wienhold – bass
- Lorenzo Milani – drums

Additional musicians

- Frank Knight – backing vocals on "The Bullet and the Bomb"
- Luke Herzog – cello on "Blind Eyes"

Production

- Manfred Melchior – mastering
- Martin Häusler – cover art, design
- Dirk Schelpmeier – photography

== Charts ==
Chart (2004)	Peak position
Swedish Albums (Sverigetopplistan)	47
German Albums (Offizielle Top 100)	83
