= Holy (U.D.O. album) =

Studio album by U.D.O.
- Released: 18 October 1999
- Recorded: 1999
- Studios: Roxx Studio, Pulheim, Germany
- Genre: Heavy metal
- Length: 45:29
- Label: Breaker/Nuclear Blast
- Producers: Udo Dirkschneider, Stefan Kaufmann

U.D.O. chronology
No Limits (1998)	Holy (1999)	Live from Russia (2001)

Professional ratings
Review scores
Source	Rating
Collector's Guide to Heavy Metal	9/10
Rock Hard	8.0/10

Holy is the seventh studio album by German heavy metal band U.D.O. It was recorded and mixed by Stefan Kaufmann at Roxx Studio in Pulheim and is the band's first album with guitarist Igor Gianola, who had played with Ronni Le Tekrø in Wild Willy's Gang. The band recruited drummer Lorenzo Milani after the release of the album; in the liner notes, the drums are credited to "Guess Who", speculating that the drum tracks were programmed.

== Track listing ==
No.	Title	Length
1.	"Holy"	4:56
2.	"Raiders of Beyond"	4:11
3.	"Shout It Out"	4:55
4.	"Recall the Sin"	4:36
5.	"Thunder in the Tower"	5:04
6.	"Back Off"	3:03
7.	"Friends Will Be Friends"	3:33
8.	"State Run Operation"	3:51
9.	"Danger"	3:23
10.	"Ride the Storm"	3:58
11.	"Cut Me Out"	3:59

2012 Bonus Tracks
No.	Title	Length
12.	"Holy" (Live)	5:20
13.	"Raiders of Beyond" (Live)	4:15
14.	"Shout It Out" (Live)	8:30
15.	"Recall the Sin" (Live)	4:51
16.	"Thunder in the Tower" (Demo)	4:29
Total length:		1:12:54

Note

The live tracks from the 2012 re-release is taken from the 2001 live album Live from Russia

== Personnel ==
U.D.O.

- Udo Dirkschneider – vocals, producer
- Stefan Kaufmann – guitar, producer, engineering, mixing
- Igor Gianola – guitar
- Fitty Wienhold – bass guitar

Additional musicians

- Frank Knight – backing vocals on "Holy", "Thunder in the Tower" and "State Run Operation", spoken words on "Holy"
- Marcus Bielenberg – backing vocals on "Shout It Out"

Production

- Manfred Melchior – mastering
- Jens Rosendahl – photography
- Andreas Marschall – cover art
