= Faceless World =

Studio album by U.D.O.
- Released: 25 February 1990
- Recorded: October 1989–January 1990
- Studios: Dierks Studios, Cologne, Germany
- Genre: Heavy metal
- Length: 53:25
- Label: RCA
- Producer: Stefan Kaufmann

U.D.O. chronology
Mean Machine (1989)	Faceless World (1990)	Timebomb (1991)

Professional ratings
Review scores
Source	Rating
AllMusic	3/5 stars
Collector's Guide to Heavy Metal	8/10
Rock Hard	8.0/10

Faceless World is the third studio album by German heavy metal band U.D.O., released on 25 February 1990 via RCA Records. It was recorded in Dierks Studios in Cologne and mastered in Hamburg. The album's musical style features a slightly lighter, more melodic heavy metal sound, achieving strong commercial success. Guitarist Andy Susemihl had left the band, but takes writing credits for "System of Life", "Living on a Frontline" and "Future Land". Guitarist Wolfgang "Wolla" Böhm was added as the band's second guitarist, but is only credited as a member and does not perform on the album. All guitar work was done by Mathias Dieth. A music video was made for "Heart of Gold".

== Track listing ==
No.	Title	Length
1.	"Heart of Gold"	5:00
2.	"Blitz of Lightning"	4:23
3.	"System of Life"	4:12
4.	"Faceless World"	6:31
5.	"Stranger"	5:15
6.	"Restricted Area"	3:09
7.	"Living on a Frontline"	4:19
8.	"Trip to Nowhere"	3:22
9.	"Born to Run"	3:26
10.	"Can't Get Enough"	3:22
11.	"Unspoken Words"	5:13
12.	"Future Land"	5:13

2013 Bonus Tracks
No.	Title	Length
13.	"Living on a Frontline" (Live)	11:46
14.	"Heart of Gold" (Live)	4:57
15.	"Heart of Gold" (Video)	5:00
Total length:		1:15:08

Note

The 12" vinyl release by RCA Records omits "Restricted Area" and "Born to Run"

== Personnel ==
- Udo Dirkschneider – vocals
- Mathias Dieth – guitars, backing vocals
- Thomas Smuszynski – bass
- Stefan Schwarzmann – drums

Production

- Stefan Kaufmann – production, mixing
- Uli Baronowsky – engineer, mixing
- Ananda Kurt Pilz – cover art
- Wolfgang Burat – photography
- Tim Eckhorst – design (anniversary edition)

== Charts ==
Chart (1990)	Peak position
German Albums (Offizielle Top 100)	52
Swedish Albums (Sverigetopplistan)	37
