= Mean Machine (U.D.O. album) =

Studio album by U.D.O.
- Released: 10 January 1989
- Recorded: 1988
- Studios: Dierks Studios, Cologne, Germany
- Genre: Heavy metal
- Length: 40:50
- Label: RCA
- Producer: Mark Dodson

U.D.O. chronology
Animal House (1987)	Mean Machine (1989)	Faceless World (1990)

Professional ratings
Review scores
Source	Rating
AllMusic	3/5 stars
Collector's Guide to Heavy Metal	6/10
Rock Hard	7.5/10

Mean Machine is the second studio album by German heavy metal band U.D.O. It was released in 1989 via RCA Records. After their previous album, Animal House, Peter Szigeti had been replaced by Andy Susemihl from Sinner, Frank Rittel by Thomas Smuszynski (who later went on to Running Wild) and Thomas Franke by Stefan Schwarzmann. Dieter Rubach, who joined the band after the recording of Animal House left and was replaced by Smuszynski.

A music video was made for "Break the Rules"

== Track listing ==
Side A
No.	Title	Length
1.	"Don't Look Back"	3:11
2.	"Break the Rules"	4:00
3.	"We're History"	3:30
4.	"Painted Love"	4:57
5.	"Mean Machine"	3:53

Side B
No.	Title	Length
6.	"Dirty Boys"	3:47
7.	"Streets on Fire"	3:50
8.	"Lost Passion"	4:10
9.	"Sweet Little Child"	4:48
10.	"Catch My Fall"	3:55
11.	"Still in Love with You"	0:49

2013 Bonus Tracks
No.	Title	Length
12.	"Break the Rules" (Live)	4:00
13.	"Break the Rules" (Video)	3:51
Total length:		48:41

== Personnel ==
- Udo Dirkschneider – vocals
- Mathias Dieth – guitars
- Andy Susemihl – guitars
- Thomas Smuszynski – bass
- Stefan Schwarzmann – drums

Production

- Mark Dodson – producer, mixing
- Uli Baronowsky – engineer
- Tim Eckhorst – design (anniversary edition)
- Deaffy, Didi Zill – cover concept
