= List of people known as the Holy =

The epithet the Holy may refer to:

- Canute IV of Denmark (c. 1042–1086), King of Denmark
- Eric IX of Sweden (died 1160), King of Sweden
- Olaf II of Norway (995–1030), King of Norway
