= Timebomb (album) =

Studio album by U.D.O.
- Released: 13 April 1991
- Recorded: November 1990 – February 1991
- Studios: Dierks Studios, Cologne, Germany
- Genres: Speed metal, heavy metal
- Length: 38:21
- Label: RCA
- Producer: Stefan Kaufmann

U.D.O. chronology
Faceless World (1990)	Timebomb (1991)	Solid (1997)

Professional ratings
Review scores
Source	Rating
AllMusic	4/5 stars
Collector's Guide to Heavy Metal	8/10
Rock Hard	7.5/10

Timebomb is the fourth studio album by German heavy metal band U.D.O. It was recorded and mixed at Dierks Studios in Cologne from November 1990 to February 1991. The album is considered the band's heaviest following a light approach on Faceless World.

The band was aided by Gaby "Deaffy" Hawke on lyrics. Deaffy was also the author of the English lyrics on the Accept albums, and is a pseudonym for Gaby Hoffmann (maiden name Hauke), manager of Accept and later married to the guitarist Wolf Hoffmann.

Timebomb was the band's last release with Mathias Dieth and Thomas Smuszynski, whom the latter joined Running Wild in 1992. It was also their last release until 1997's Solid; in the time between, Udo Dirkschneider took part in the Accept reunion.

== Track listing ==
No.	Title	Length
1.	"The Gutter" (Instrumental)	1:04
2.	"Metal Eater"	3:42
3.	"Thunderforce"	3:40
4.	"Overloaded" (Instrumental)	1:05
5.	"Burning Heat"	3:14
6.	"Back in Pain"	3:46
7.	"Timebomb"	3:57
8.	"Powersquad"	4:13
9.	"Kick in the Face"	3:47
10.	"Soldiers of Darkness"	4:12
11.	"Metal Maniac Master Mind"	5:41

2013 Bonus Tracks
No.	Title	Length
12.	"Metal Eater" (Live)	4:15
13.	"Album-EPK" (Video)
Total length:		42:36

== Credits ==
- Udo Dirkschneider – vocals
- Mathias Dieth – guitars
- Thomas Smuszynski – bass
- Stefan Schwarzmann – drums

Production

- Stefan Kaufmann – production
- Uli Baronowsky – engineering, mixing
- Tim Eckhorst – design (anniversary edition)
- Andreas Marschall – cover art
