= Rev-Raptor =

Studio album by U.D.O.
- Released: 20 May 2011
- Recorded: June 2010 – February 2011
- Studios: Roxx Studio, Pulheim, Germany
- Genre: Heavy metal
- Length: 51:09
- Label: AFM
- Producer: Stefan Kaufmann

U.D.O. chronology
Dominator (2009)	Rev-Raptor (2011)	Steelhammer (2013)

Professional ratings
Review scores
Source	Rating
Jukebox:Metal	4/5 stars
Metalholic	(7.3/10)

Rev-Raptor is the 13th studio album by German heavy metal band U.D.O., released on 20 May 2011 via AFM Records. It is the final album to feature Stefan Kaufmann and Igor Gianola.

Music videos were made for "Leatherhead" and "I Give as Good as I Get".

== Track listing ==
No.	Title	Length
1.	"Rev-Raptor"	3:41
2.	"Leatherhead"	4:09
3.	"Renegade"	3:29
4.	"I Give as Good as I Get"	4:18
5.	"Dr. Death"	3:46
6.	"Rock 'n' Roll Soldiers"	4:16
7.	"Terrorvision"	3:59
8.	"Underworld"	4:18
9.	"Pain Man"	3:53
10.	"Fairy Tales of Victory"	4:01
11.	"Motor-Borg"	3:24
12.	"True Born Winners"	3:26
13.	"Days of Hope and Glory"	4:27

Limited Edition Bonus Tracks
No.	Title	Length
1.	"Time Dilator"	3:29
2.	"Heavy Metal W.O.A."	2:54
3.	"I Give A Good As I Get" (Video)	4:19
4.	"Leatherhead" (Video)	4:10
Total length:		1:06:01

Japanese Bonus Tracks
No.	Title	Length
1.	"Stormbreaker"	3:26
2.	"Bodyworld"	4:43
Total length:		59:18

== Personnel ==
- Udo Dirkschneider: vocals
- Stefan Kaufmann: guitar
- Igor Gianola: guitar
- Fitty Wienhold: bass
- Francesco Jovino: drums
