= Man and Machine (album) =

Studio album by U.D.O.
- Released: 24 July 2002
- Recorded: September 2001–January 2002
- Studios: Roxx Studio, Pulheim, Germany
- Genre: Heavy metal
- Length: 52:51
- Label: Breaker/SPV
- Producers: Udo Dirkschneider, Stefan Kaufmann

U.D.O. chronology
Live from Russia (2001)	Man and Machine (2002)	Thunderball (2004)

Professional ratings
Review scores
Source	Rating
AllMusic	2.5/5 stars
Rock Hard	8.0/10

Man and Machine is the eighth studio album by German heavy metal band U.D.O., released on 24 July 2002. A music video was made for "Dancing with an Angel", featuring a duet performance with Udo Dirkschneider and Warlock vocalist Doro Pesch.

== Track listing ==
No.	Title	Length
1.	"Man and Machine"	5:40
2.	"Private Eye"	3:57
3.	"Animal Instinct"	4:12
4.	"The Dawn of the Gods"	4:53
5.	"Dancing with an Angel"	4:12
6.	"Silent Cry"	5:22
7.	"Network Nightmare"	4:04
8.	"Hard to Be Honest"	4:51
9.	"Like a Lion"	4:16
10.	"Black Heart"	4:32
11.	"Unknown Traveller"	6:52

Japanese Bonus Tracks
No.	Title	Length
1.	"Metal Eater" (Live)	3:45
2.	"Heart of Gold" (Live)	4:41
Total length:		1:01:17

2012 Bonus Tracks
No.	Title	Length
1.	"Man and Machine" (Live)	6:23
2.	"Dancing with an Angel" (Remix)	4:31
Total length:		1:03:45

== Personnel ==
U.D.O.

- Udo Dirkschneider – vocals, producer
- Stefan Kaufmann – guitar, producer, engineer, mixing
- Igor Gianola – guitar
- Fitty Wienhold – bass
- Lorenzo Milani – drums

Additional musicians

- Doro Pesch – additional vocals on "Dancing with an Angel"
- Frank Knight – backing vocals on "Animal Instinct" and "The Dawn of the Gods"

Production

- Manfred Melchior – mastering
- Jens Rosendahl – cover art, photography
- Oliver Kämper – design
