= A Tribute to Judas Priest: Legends of Metal =

1997 compilation tribute album

A Tribute to Judas Priest: Legends of Metal Vol. I

Compilation album by Various artists
- Released: 1997
- Genre: Heavy metal, power metal, progressive metal
- Length: 59:39

Professional ratings
Review scores
Source	Rating
AllMusic	2/5 stars
MusicHound Rock	2/5 stars

A Tribute to Judas Priest: Legends of Metal Vol. II

Compilation album by Various artists
- Released: 1997
- Genre: Heavy metal, power metal, progressive metal
- Length: 59:39

A Tribute to Judas Priest: Legends of Metal Vol. I and A Tribute to Judas Priest: Legends of Metal Vol. II are tribute albums, both released in 1997 by Century Media Records. It includes several rock and metal bands such as Helloween, Overkill, Saxon, Heavens Gate, Blind Guardian, Mercyful Fate, and Iced Earth, covering songs by British heavy metal band Judas Priest. Some of the songs included in this album have been previously released by the artists.

== Track listing ==
Volume 1
No.	Title	Band	Length
1.	"The Hellion/Electric Eye"	Helloween	4:05
2.	"Saints in Hell"	Fates Warning	5:06
3.	"Victim of Changes"	Gamma Ray	7:20
4.	"Sinner"	Devin Townsend	7:55
5.	"The Ripper"	Mercyful Fate	2:51
6.	"Jawbreaker"	Rage	3:26
7.	"Night Crawler"	Radakka	5:51
8.	"Burnin' Up"	Doom Squad	3:57
9.	"A Touch of Evil"	Lion's Share	5:39
10.	"Rapid Fire"	Testament	3:42
11.	"Metal Gods"	U.D.O.	4:09
12.	"You've Got Another Thing Comin'"	Saxon	5:31

Volume 2
No.	Title	Band	Length
1.	"The Ripper"	Iced Earth	2:44
2.	"Beyond the Realms of Death"	Blind Guardian	7:02
3.	"The Sentinel"	Heavens Gate	5:00
4.	"Love Bites"	Nevermore	5:21
5.	"Exciter"	Gamma Ray	5:01
6.	"Dissident Aggressor"	Forbidden	2:45
7.	"Painkiller"	Angra	6:04
8.	"Tyrant"	Overkill	4:00
9.	"Grinder"	Kreator	3:57
10.	"Dreamer Deceiver"	Skyclad	4:05
11.	"Bloodstone"	Stratovarius	3:55
12.	"Screaming for Vengeance"	Virgin Steele	5:11
13.	"Night Comes Down"	Leviathan	4:19

== Alternate releases ==
There are also a red-cover version (digipak) of Volume I and green-cover version (jewel case) of Volume II (subtitled "Delivering The Goods" instead of "Legends Of Metal"). Both CDs are released by the US branch of Century Media. The tracks are arranged across the two volumes in a different order, and the following tracks are not present:

- "A Touch of Evil" (Lion's Share)
- "The Sentinel" (Heaven's Gate)
- "Dreamer Deceiver" (Skyclad)
- "Night Comes Down" (Leviathan)

Two more tracks are nevertheless exclusive to these alternative releases, namely "Exciter" by Strapping Young Lad on Volume I and "Desert Plains" by Iron Savior on Volume II.
