= Dominator (U.D.O. album) =

Studio album by U.D.O.
- Released: 21 August 2009
- Recorded: Roxx Studio, Pulheim, Germany, August 2008 – June 2009
- Genre: Heavy metal
- Length: 44:48
- Label: AFM
- Producer: Stefan Kaufmann

U.D.O. chronology
Mastercutor (2007)	Dominator (2009)	Rev-Raptor (2011)

Professional ratings
Review scores
Source	Rating
AllMusic	3.5/5 stars
Jukebox:Metal	4/5 stars

Dominator is the twelfth studio album by German heavy metal band U.D.O., released via AFM Records on 21 August 2009.

A music video was made for "Black and White", which is included in most CD releases.

== Track listing ==
No.	Title	Length
1.	"The Bogeyman"	4:03
2.	"Dominator"	4:45
3.	"Black and White"	4:08
4.	"Infected"	3:35
5.	"Heavy Metal Heaven"	4:20
6.	"Doom Ride"	5:21
7.	"Stillness of Time"	6:31
8.	"Devil's Rendezvous"	3:35
9.	"Speed Demon"	4:04
10.	"Whispers in the Dark"	4:26

Japanese Bonus Track
No.	Title	Length
1.	"Bleeding Heart"	2:57
Total length:		47:45

Limited Edition Bonus Track
No.	Title	Length
1.	"Pleasure in the Darkroom"	4:20
Total length:		49:08

== Charts ==
Album

Year	Chart	Position	Nation
2009	Top 100 Albums	27	Germany
2009	Finnish Albums Chart	35	Finland
2009	Swedish Albums Chart	51	Sweden
2009	Schweizer Hit Parade	100	Switzerland

== Personnel ==
- Udo Dirkschneider: vocals
- Stefan Kaufmann: guitar, piano
- Igor Gianola: guitar
- Fitty Wienhold: bass, piano
- Francesco Jovino: drums

=== Additional musicians ===
- Mathias Dieth: lead guitars on "Devil's Rendezvous"
