= Animal House (U.D.O. album) =

Studio album by U.D.O.
- Released: 3 November 1987
- Recorded: August–October 1987
- Studios: Dierks Studios, Cologne, Germany
- Genre: Heavy metal
- Length: 42:01
- Label: RCA
- Producer: Mark Dodson

U.D.O. chronology
Animal House (1987)	Mean Machine (1988)

Professional ratings
Review scores
Source	Rating
AllMusic	3/5 stars
Collector's Guide to Heavy Metal	7/10
Rock Hard	8.0/10

Animal House is the first album by German heavy metal band U.D.O., following Udo Dirkschneider's departure from Accept. It was recorded from August to October 1987 at Dierks Studios in Cologne. Released in 1987, it charted at No. 41 in Sweden.

According to Dirkschneider, it was written and planned to be the follow-up to Accept's 1986 album Russian Roulette, but as a result of his departure from the band, he was given the album as compensation as they did not want its material and wanted to shift to a more commercial sound.

The album was recorded by U.D.O., except the song "Lay Down the Law", which features all Accept members.

In some releases, a picture of the tour band including Dieter Rubach and Andy Susemihl was shown in the booklet. The album cover shows the line-up that recorded the album. A tour followed in early 1988. During this time they also toured with Guns N' Roses, Lita Ford and Zodiac Mindwarp. After Rubach left the band, they supported Ozzy Osbourne on all European dates in 1989.

A music video was made for "They Want War".

== Contemporary reviews ==
In the June 1988 issue of Circus magazine, music critic Paul Gallotta noted that the debut solo effort from the former Accept frontman demonstrated a surprisingly accessible musical direction. The reviewer observed that while the upbeat traditional European heavy metal tracks—such as "Black Widow," "Go Back to Hell," and the title track—delivered exactly what audiences anticipated, they were distinguished by genuine harmonies and a strong sense of melody. Furthermore, Gallotta emphasized that the most striking aspect of the record lay in its ballads. The publication highlighted "In the Darkness" and "Run for Cover" as exceptionally memorable compositions, arguing that their hook-laden nature allowed listeners to easily overlook the frontman's signature harsh and abrasive vocal delivery.

== Track listing ==
Side A
No.	Title	Length
1.	"Animal House"	4:19
2.	"Go Back to Hell"	4:31
3.	"They Want War"	4:12
4.	"Black Widow"	4:29
5.	"In the Darkness"	4:03

Side B
No.	Title	Length
6.	"Lay Down the Law"	3:47
7.	"We Want It Loud"	4:06
8.	"Warrior"	4:12
9.	"Coming Home"	3:39
10.	"Run for Cover"	4:43

CD Bonus Track
No.	Title	Length
1.	"Hot Tonight"	4:37
Total length:		46:38

2013 Bonus Tracks
No.	Title	Length
1.	"Hot Tonight"	4:37
2.	"Animal House" (Live)	3:58
3.	"They Want War" (Live)	5:42
4.	"In the Darkness" (Live)	6:05
5.	"They Want War" (Video)	4:25
6.	"Go Back to Hell" (Video)	4:02
Total length:		1:04:48

== Personnel ==
- Udo Dirkschneider – vocals
- Mathias Dieth – guitars
- Peter Szigeti – guitars
- Frank Rittel – bass
- Thomas Franke – drums

Additional musicians

- Pulheimer Kinder- und Jugendchor – additional vocals to "They Want War"

Production

- Produced and engineered by Mark Dodson
- Mixed by Mark Dodson and Gerd Rautenbauch
- Assistant engineers: Uli Baronowsky, Thomas P. Sehringer
- Recorded and mixed August–October 1987 at Dierks Studios, Cologne
- Mastering at Sterling Sound Studios, New York
- Cover idea, concept and realization: Peek-A-Boo (Donald Campbell, Nico Chiraiatti)
- Cover photo: Akzent Studios
- Anniversary Edition design: Tim Eckhorst
