= Mastercutor =

Studio album by U.D.O.
- Released: 18 May 2007
- Recorded: October 2006 – March 2007
- Genre: Heavy metal
- Label: AFM Records
- Producer: Stefan Kaufmann

U.D.O. chronology
Mission No. X (2005)	Mastercutor (2007)	Dominator (2009)

Professional ratings
Review scores
Source	Rating
Jukebox:Metal	4/5 stars

Mastercutor is the eleventh album by German heavy metal band U.D.O., released on 18 May 2007. The album's title is a shortened version of "Master Executor".

A music video was made for "The Wrong Side of Midnight"

== Track listing ==
No.	Title	Length
1.	"Mastercutor"	5:17
2.	"The Wrong Side of Midnight"	4:54
3.	"The Instigator"	3:48
4.	"One Lone Voice"	4:21
5.	"We Do - For You"	4:04
6.	"Walker of the Dark"	5:01
7.	"Master of Disaster"	4:15
8.	"Tears of a Clown"	3:54
9.	"Vendetta"	4:12
10.	"The Devil Walks Alone"	3:21
11.	"Dead Man's Eyes"	4:27
12.	"Crash Bang Crash"	3:06

AFM Limited Edition Bonus Tracks
No.	Title	Length
1.	"Borderline"	4:12
2.	"Screaming Eagles"	3:34
3.	"The Wrong Side of Midnight" (Video)	4:00
Total length:		1:02:20

Japanese Bonus Track
No.	Title	Length
1.	"Man a King Ruler"	3:34
Total length:		54:06

CD-Maximum Limited Edition Bonus Tracks
No.	Title	Length
1.	"Плачет Солдат"	5:50
2.	"The Wrong Side of Midnight" (Single Version)	3:58
3.	"Streets of Sin"	3:03
4.	"Man a King Ruler"	3:34
5.	"The Wrong Side of Midnight" (Video)	4:00
Total length:		1:10:57

Notes

- Плачет Солдат is a Russian version of "Cry Soldier Cry" from Mission No. X. The other three tracks are from The Wrong Side of Midnight EP
- The AFM Limited Edition and CD-Maximum Limited Edition releases contain "The Wrong Side of Midnight" music video

== Credits ==
- Udo Dirkschneider: vocals
- Stefan Kaufmann: guitar
- Igor Gianola: guitar
- Fitty Wienhold: bass
- Francesco Jovino: drums
