= Solid (U.D.O. album) =

Studio album by U.D.O.
- Released: 24 March 1997
- Recorded: 1997
- Studios: Roxx Studios, Pulheim, Germany
- Genre: Heavy metal
- Length: 52:54
- Label: GUN
- Producers: Stefan Kaufmann, Udo Dirkschneider

U.D.O. chronology
| Timebomb (1991) | Solid (1997) | No Limits (1998) |

Professional ratings
Review scores
| Source | Rating |
|---|---|
| Collector's Guide to Heavy Metal | 8/10 |
| Rock Hard | 9.0/10 |

Solid is the fifth studio album by German heavy metal band U.D.O.

In 1992, Udo Dirkschneider put the band on hiatus to reunite with Accept. Tensions in the band resurfaced, causing Dirkschneider to depart in 1996; drummer Stefan Kaufmann being unable to perform again from a recurring back injury he first sustained while touring in 1989; declining momentum prompted Accept to go on an indefinite hiatus in 1997. Dirkschneider would reinstate U.D.O., bringing Kaufmann and Stefan Schwarzmann with him; Kaufmann now performing as a guitarist. Fitty Weinhold and Jürgen Graf from Bullet were hired as new members.

The album was recorded and mixed at Roxx Studios in Pulheim.

A music video was made for "Independence Day"

== Track listing ==
| No. | Title | Length |
|---|---|---|
| 1. | "Independence Day" | 6:01 |
| 2. | "Two Faced Woman" | 3:38 |
| 3. | "Desperate Balls" | 3:54 |
| 4. | "The Punisher" | 4:46 |
| 5. | "Devil's Dice" | 4:33 |
| 6. | "Bad Luck" | 4:56 |
| 7. | "Preachers of the Night" | 4:44 |
| 8. | "Hate Stinger" | 4:59 |
| 9. | "Braindead Hero" | 5:13 |
| 10. | "Pray for the Hunted" | 4:01 |
| 11. | "The Healer" | 6:09 |

Japanese Bonus Track
| No. | Title | Length |
|---|---|---|
| 1. | "Hardcore Lover" | 4:44 |
| Total length: | | 57:38 |

2012 Bonus Tracks
| No. | Title | Length |
|---|---|---|
| 1. | "Independence Day" (Live) | 5:54 |
| 2. | "Mad Dogs And Loaded Guns" (Demo) | 5:27 |
| 3. | "Warchild" (Demo) | 5:58 |
| 4. | "Independence Day" (Video) | 4:25 |
| Total length: | | 1:14:36 |

== Personnel ==
- Udo Dirkschneider – vocals, producer
- Stefan Kaufmann – guitar, producer, engineer, mixing
- Jürgen Graf – guitar
- Fitty Wienhold – bass guitar
- Stefan Schwarzmann – drums

Production

- Manfred Melchior – mastering
- Jens Rosendahl – photography
- Andreas Marschall – cover art
