= Dieter Rubach =

German musician

- Born: 28 April 1955 (age 70); Solingen, West Germany
- Genres: Rock, heavy metal, hard rock, pop rock
- Occupations: Musician, producer
- Instruments: Bass, guitar, keyboards, vocals
- Website: www.concertpower.de

Dieter Rubach (born 28 April 1955) is a German bass player, composer, engineer and producer.

== Life and career ==
In the early 1970s, Rubach joined the heavy metal band Accept, first on keyboards, later on bass until he left in 1978 and was succeeded by Peter Baltes. In 1983, after leaving the German pop band Lichtblick, he formed his own hard rock band Bad Steve, along with other ex-Accept members like Frank Friedrich and Jan Koemmet, who left the band after their albums Breaker and Restless And Wild. Rumors and pictures say that 3 other Accept members (Jörg Fischer, Stefan Kaufmann and Hansi Heitzer) also played with Bad Steve.

In 1985, they released the album Killing The Night (produced by Alphaville's producer Wolfgang Loos), including the single Across The Rainbow, where a video was shot. They also supported Accept for a 1984 tour. It was the band's only album, before they split. It showcased Rubach as a songwriter and guitarist too.→

When lead singer Udo Dirkschneider left Accept in 1987, he formed his own band called U.D.O., recorded the album Animal House and asked Rubach for a brief stint in his touring band. The tour started in early February 1988 and U.D.O. played in Hungary, Germany, Norway, Denmark, Belgium, Netherlands, UK, France, Finland, US and Canada. Rubach appears on several bootlegs, as well as on a RTL TV special called "MOSH". They also did a tour with Guns N' Roses, Zodiac Mindwarp and Lita Ford (where he met his old friend Martin Gerschwitz again) before he left the band in 1989.

Rubach continued to work as a session musician and arranger for famous German acts like Anne Haigis and Nino de Angelo. As a bandmember he also recorded with Scholle & his Friends, Melo Mafali, Eisenhertz, Lothar und die Trabanten and many more.

In the new millennium he was part of Martin Gerschwitz & Friends. They also shot a DVD at the SAE, Frankfurt in 2004, before he left the band and continued to record and perform with German bands The Pirates of Love, Funky Frank, Justin Nova and others.

As an audio engineer he worked for many artists like Scorpions, Elton John, Bonnie Tyler, Whitney Houston, Lionel Richie, Joe Cocker, Luciano Pavarotti, Iggy Pop, Pet Shop Boys, Chris de Burgh, Chris Rea, Art Garfunkel, Muddy Waters, Paul Young, Kelly Family, Electric Light Orchestra, Ace of Base, Miguel Rios, Billy Cobham, Helge Schneider, Rednex, Milva, Tato Gomez, Karel Gott, The United Jazz and Rock Ensemble, Supermax, Leningrad Cowboys, Angelika Milster, Baden Powell de Aquino, Grobschnitt, Tarkan, Beverly Craven, Andre Heller, Vaya Con Dios, Eleni Tzoka and for the musicals Jesus Christ Superstar, Cabaret, The Magic Flute and The Jungle Book. He also worked as a roadie, stage technician and light operator. He also recorded albums with Gil Scott-Heron, Rufus Thomas, Bourbon $treet and Irek Dudek. He owns a recording studio in Mannheim, Germany, Para-Studio.

Under a pseudonym he wrote several songs for the Eurovision Song Contest.

== Discography ==
- 1982 – Lichtblick – Lichtblick '82
- 1985 – Bad Steve – Killing The Night
- 1991 – Lothar und die Trabanten – Unter dem Wartburg

=== As sound engineer ===
- 1990 – Gil Scott-Heron – Tales of Gil Scott-Heron
- 1990 – Ozo – In the Threshold of Jain
- 1992 – Rufus Thomas – Timeless Funk
- 1992 – Anne Haigis – Cry Wolf
- 1992 – Melo Mafali – Babylons Acumen
- 1995 – Aida – Presents Mythos
- 1997 – Bourbon $treet – Live on the Rocks
- 2000 – Bourbon $treet – Straight Up Rock'n Roll

=== DVD ===
- 2003 – U.D.O. – Nailed To Metal (Compilation) GER: #100
- 2004 – Martin Gerschwitz & Friends – Live in Frankfurt
