= Decadent (U.D.O. album) =

Studio album by U.D.O.
- Released: January 23, 2015
- Recorded: 2014
- Genre: Heavy metal
- Length: 59:21
- Label: AFM
- Producers: Udo Dirkschneider, Fitty Weinhold

U.D.O. chronology
Steelhammer (2013)	Decadent (2015)	Steelfactory (2018)

Decadent is the 15th studio album by German heavy metal band U.D.O. It was released on 23 January 2015 in Europe and 3 February 2015 in the United States through AFM Records. On 12 December 2014, "Decadent" was released as the first single. It is the last album to feature drummer Francesco Jovino as well as guitarist Kasperi Heikkinen.

A music video was made for "Decadent".

== Reception ==
Professional ratings
Review scores
Source	Rating
Terrorizer	6/10

Jimmy Martin of Terrorizer gave the album a moderate rating, and wrote, "True to form, 'Decadent' [...] is chock full of the man's trademark bluster, which has essentially remained stylistically frozen in 'Metal Heart'/'Screaming For Vengeance' formation. [...] Gloriously oblivious to all or any developments elsewhere in metal, 'Decadent' [...] is possessed of a vim, vigour and strident joie-de-vivre that proves very hard to resist."

== Track listing ==
No.	Title	Length
1.	"Speeder"	3:45
2.	"Decadent"	4:49
3.	"House of Fake"	4:26
4.	"Mystery"	4:36
5.	"Pain"	5:10
6.	"Secrets in Paradise"	5:00
7.	"Meaning of Life"	4:34
8.	"Breathless"	5:21
9.	"Under Your Skin"	4:22
10.	"Untouchable"	5:09
11.	"Rebels of the Night"	4:41
12.	"Words in Flame"	7:36

Limited Edition Bonus Tracks
No.	Title	Length
1.	"Let Me Out"	3:55
2.	"Shadow Eyes"	4:20
Total length:		1:07:36

Japanese Bonus Tracks
No.	Title	Length
1.	"Fallen Angels"	4:55
2.	"Let Me Out"	3:55
3.	"Shadow Eyes"	4:20
Total length:		1:12:31

== Personnel ==
- Udo Dirkschneider: vocals
- Andrey Smirnov: guitars
- Kasperi Heikkinen: guitars
- Fitty Wienhold: bass
- Francesco Jovino: drums

Guest musicians

- Ingmar Viertel: backing vocals
- Claus Rettkowski: backing vocals

Production

- Jacob Hansen: mastering
- Martin Häusler: photography
- Dirk Hüttner: cover art
- Hiko: Design, layout
- Holger Thielbörger: editing
- Fitty Wienhold: producer
- Udo Dirkschneider: producer
- Mattes: producer, mixing
