= No Limits (U.D.O. album) =

Studio album by U.D.O.
- Released: 20 April 1998
- Recorded: 1998
- Studios: Roxx Studio, Pulheim, Germany
- Genre: Heavy metal
- Length: 53:35
- Label: GUN
- Producers: Stefan Kaufmann, Udo Dirkschneider

U.D.O. chronology
Solid (1997)	No Limits (1998)	Holy (1999)

Professional ratings
Review scores
Source	Rating
Collector's Guide to Heavy Metal	7/10
Rock Hard	9.0/10

No Limits is the sixth studio album by German heavy metal band U.D.O. It was recorded and mixed by Stefan Kaufmann at Roxx Studio in Pulheim. No Limits is the last album to feature guitarist Jürgen Graf.

The album includes a new recording of "I'm a Rebel" from Accept's album I'm a Rebel. "Love Machine" is a cover version of a song by Supermax. "Azrael" was written by the German musician Albert Böhne in connection with a book by German horror writer Wolfgang Hohlbein.

== Track listing ==
No.	Title	Length
1.	"The Gate"	0:51
2.	"Freelance Man"	4:24
3.	"Way of Life"	4:45
4.	"No Limits"	4:01
5.	"With a Vengeance"	5:26
6.	"One Step to Fate"	5:10
7.	"Backstreet Loner"	3:28
8.	"Raise the Crown"	4:06
9.	"Manhunt"	4:16
10.	"Rated X"	3:54
11.	"Lovemachine"	5:24
12.	"I'm a Rebel"	2:19
13.	"Azrael"	5:31

Japanese Bonus Track
No.	Title	Length
1.	"The Key"	4:07
Total length:		57:42

2012 Bonus Tracks
No.	Title	Length
1.	"No Limits" (Live)	4:12
2.	"The Key"	4:07
3.	"Azrael" (Remix)	5:32
4.	"Rated X" (Demo)	3:06
5.	"Tough Luck" (Demo)	2:40
Total length:		1:13:00

== Personnel ==
U.D.O.

- Udo Dirkschneider – vocals, producer
- Stefan Kaufmann – guitars, backing vocals, producer, engineer, mixing
- Jürgen Graf – guitars, backing vocals
- Fitty Wienhold – bass, backing vocals
- Stefan Schwarzmann – drums

Additional musicians

- Mathias Dieth – guitar solo on "One Step to Fate"

Production

- Manfred Melchior – mastering
- Jan Meininghaus – cover art
- Jens Rosendahl – photography
- Peter Lohde – design
- Tim Eckhorst – design (anniversary edition)
