= U.D.O. =

German heavy metal band

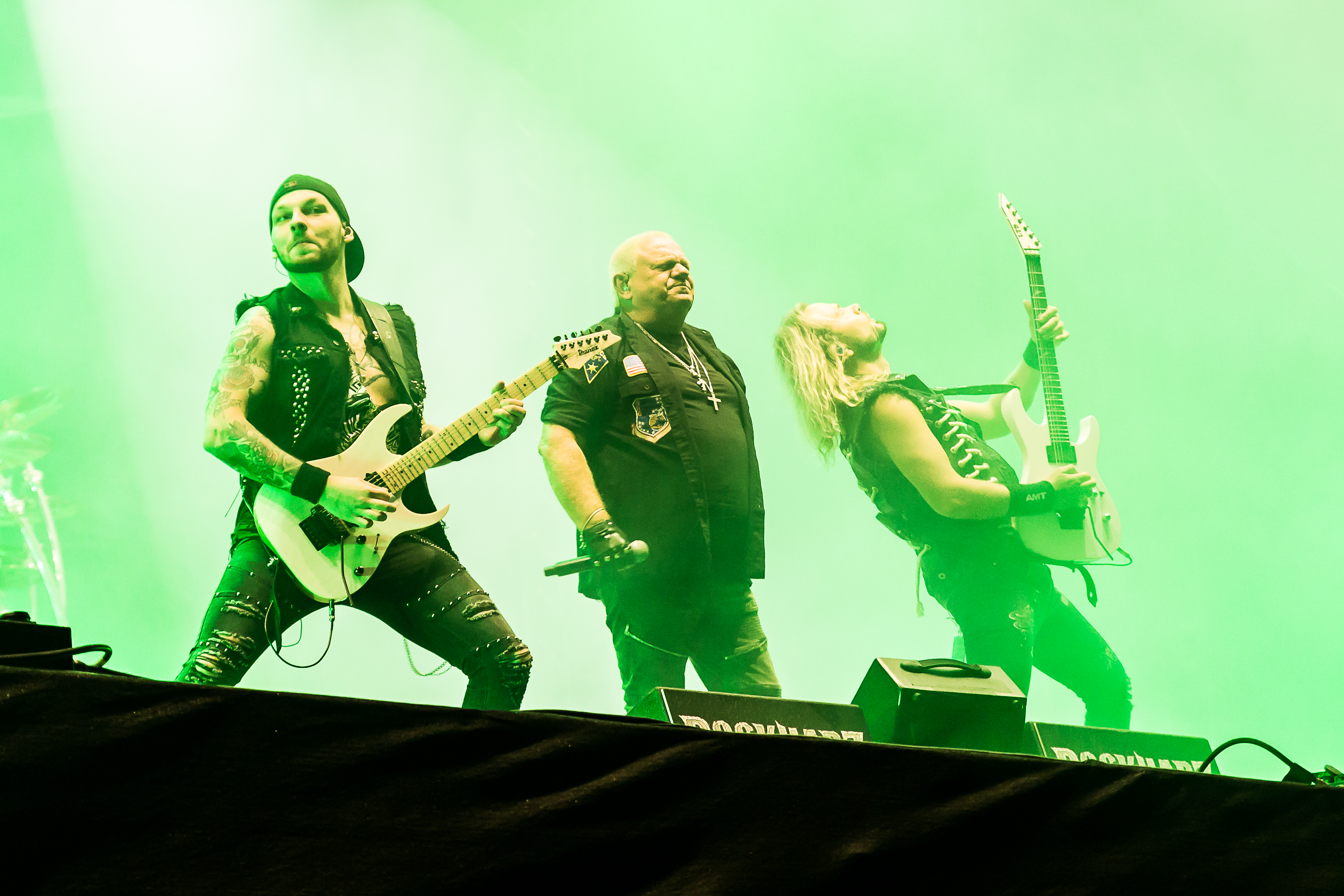
- U.D.O. performing in 2019

Background information
- Also known as: Dirkschneider (2018–present)
- Origin: Solingen, Germany
- Genre: Heavy metal
- Years active: 1987–1992; 1996–present
- Labels: AFM, Breaker, GUN, RCA
- Spinoff of: Accept
- Members: Udo Dirkschneider; Sven Dirkschneider; Dee Dammers; Peter Baltes; Alen Brentini
- Past members: Peter Szigeti; Frank Rittel; Mathias Dieth; Thomas Franke; Wolla Böhm; Dieter Rubach; Andy Susemihl; Thomas Smuszynski; Stefan Schwarzmann; Frank Fricke; Jurgen Graf; Lorenzo Milani; Stefan Kaufmann; Igor Gianola; Francesco Jovino; Kasperi Heikkinen; Bill Hudson; Fitty Wienhold; Tilen Hudrap; Andrey Smirnov
- Website: www.udo-online.de

U.D.O. is a German heavy metal band founded in Solingen by vocalist Udo Dirkschneider following his departure from Accept in 1987. The current members of the band are vocalist Udo Dirkschneider, guitarists Dee Sommers and Alen Brentini, bassist Peter Baltes, who is also a former member of Accept, and drummer Sven Dirkschneider, the son of Udo.

== History ==
Following Dirkschneider's departure from Accept in 1987, he formed his own band called U.D.O. The first line-up consisted of guitarists Mathias Dieth and Peter Szigeti, bassist Frank Rittel and drummer Thomas Franke. They released the debut album Animal House on 3 November 1987, which was entirely written by Accept. Szigeti, Rittel and Franke departed the band and were replaced by guitarist Andy Susemihl, bassist Thomas Smuzyszki and drummer Stefan Schwarzmann. The second album Mean Machine was released on 10 January 1989.

Susemihl left the band, leaving U.D.O. as a four-piece. The third album Faceless World was released on 25 February 1990. Its sound was a more commercial output, but achieving great success; this being their best selling album so far. The fourth album Timebomb was released on 3 April 1991. It was a heavier effort than their previous releases. In 1992, Dirkschneider put the band on hiatus to reunite with Accept.

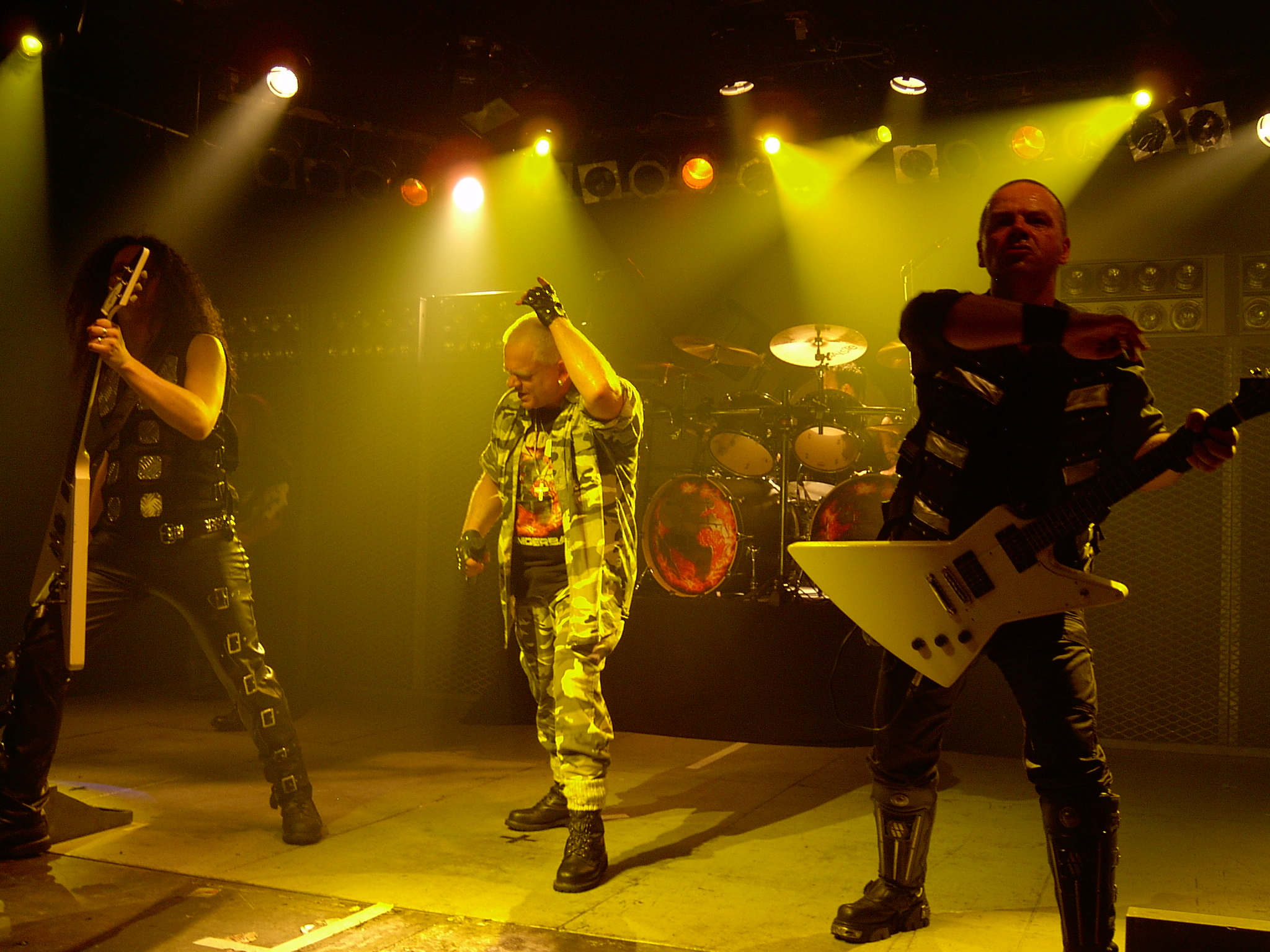
U.D.O. performing in 2004

In 1996, Dirkschneider reactivated U.D.O. with a brand new line-up; former Accept drummer Stefan Kaufmann, now performing as a guitarist, with guitarist Jürgen Graf and bassist Fitty Wienhold from Bullet and returning member Stefan Schwarzmann. The band recorded the Judas Priest song "Metal Gods" for the 1997 compilation album A Tribute to Judas Priest: Legends of Metal.

On 24 March 1997, U.D.O. released their fifth album Solid. It was featured on the Rock Hard magazine reader charts for more than a year after its release. The album was followed up with No Limits on 20 April 1998, featuring a similar songwriting approach from Solid. It features a cover of the Austrian pop band Supermax's hit single "Love Machine". After the conclusion of the band's tour, Stefan Schwarzmann quit the band. He was replaced with new drummer Lorenzo Milani.

The next album Holy was released on 18 October 1999, receiving critical acclaim. It was a return to the guitar-driven sound similar to the Balls to the Wall-era Accept. A world tour followed with dates in the United States and several other major countries. The band known as Vanize, fronted by Udo Dirkschneider's brother Peter, supported U.D.O. during the tour. Line-up changes occurred during the second part of the tour with Gotthard guitarist Igor Gianola replacing Jürgen Graf. The tour spawned the first live album Live from Russia, which was released on 15 October 2001, a 2-CD release.

On 24 July 2002, the eighth album Man and Machine was released, receiving a somewhat lukewarm reception. Despite standout songs such as the title track and "Private Eye", the album was ultimately less successful than Holy. It is notable for the song "Dancing with an Angel", featuring a duet performance of Dirkschneider and vocalist Doro Pesch. U.D.O. released their ninth studio album Thunderball on 29 March 2004. The follow-up album Mission No. X was originally due for release on 4 October 2005, but was pushed forward by one week and was released on 30 September 2005 instead. It was the first album to feature Edge of Forever drummer Francesco Jovino.

On 18 May 2007, the eleventh album Mastercutor was released. In August 2007, bassist Fitty Weinhold was unable to perform with the band due to "private reasons". He would be temporarily replaced with former Majesty bassist Marcus Bielenberg for touring purposes. The second live album Mastercutor Alive was released on 26 September 2008. U.D.O.'s twelfth studio album Dominator was released on 21 August 2009. The next studio album Rev-Raptor was originally due for release on 14 January 2011, but was delayed until 18 March 2011 due to the recurrence of Stefan Kaufmann's back problems. It was delayed again, but was officially released on 20 May 2011. The third live album Live in Sofia was released on 9 November 2012.

In September 2012, Kaufmann announced his departure for health reasons. He would continue to work in the surroundings of the band and produce for other bands in his own personal studio. On 15 January 2013, Russian guitarist Andrey Smirnov was recruited as the new member. A week later, Igor Gianola left the band "due to conflicts between band appointments and his private life and business." Following his departure, guitarist Kasperi Heikkinen joined the band. The fourteenth album Steelhammer was released on 20 May 2013. The fourth live album Steelhammer – Live from Moscow was released in May 2014.

In December 2014, drummer Francesco Jovino left the band for personal reasons, joining Primal Fear in 2015. He was replaced by Udo Dirkschneider's son Sven in February 2015. U.D.O. released the fifteenth studio album Decadent on 23 January 2015. The fifth album titled Navy Metal Night was released on 30 July 2015 as the band performed with a German navy orchestra (Marinemusikkorps Nordsee).

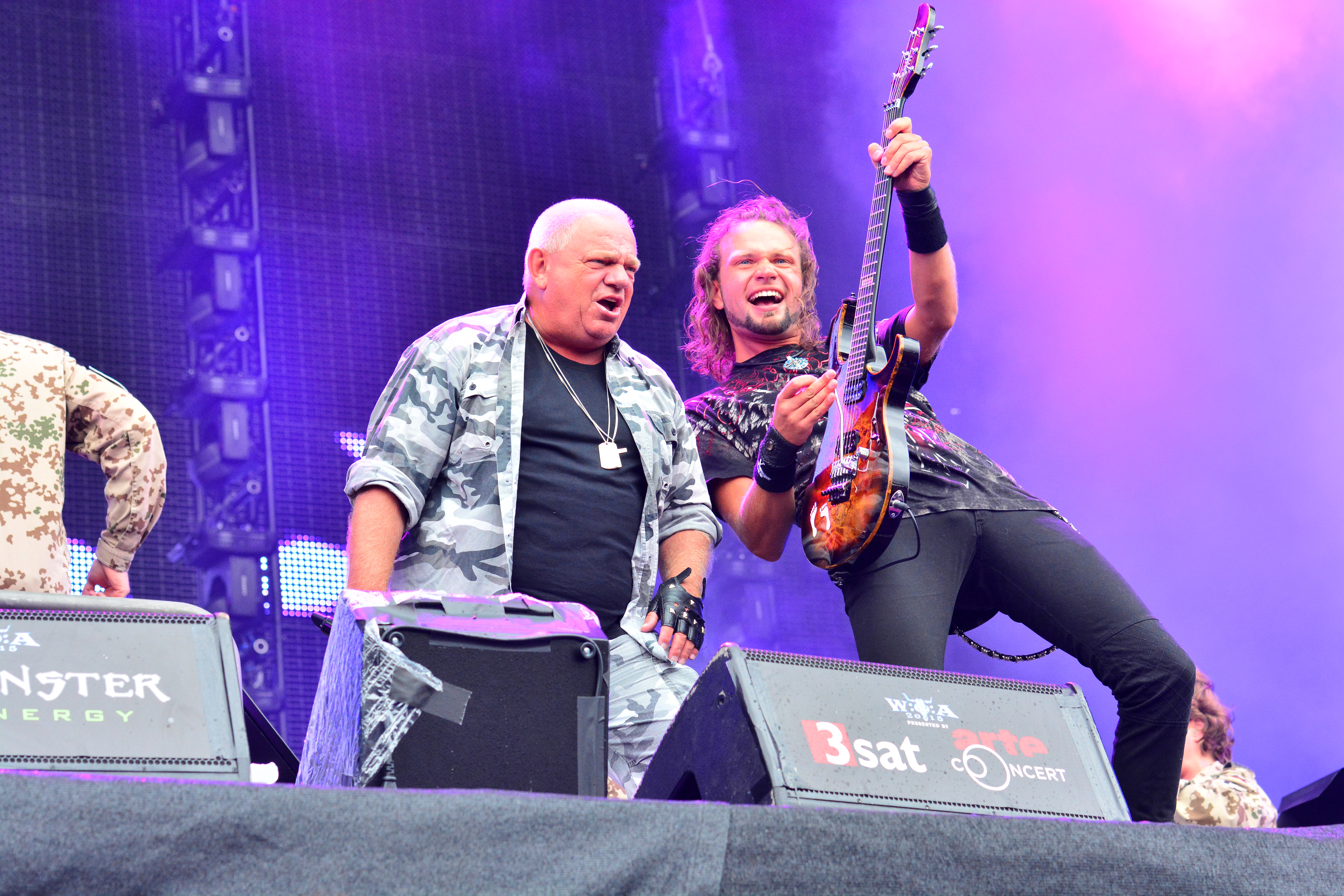
U.D.O. at Wacken Open Air 2015

In February 2017, Heikkinen announced his departure citing personal reasons. According to the band, no bad blood or drama were involved between the two. In March 2017, guitarist Bill Hudson was announced as the new member. On 24 April 2018, Hudson parted ways with the band "due to a difference in their individual visions for the future", according to Dirkschneider, adding that there was no "negative feelings on either side." In June 2018, Stefan Kaufmann temporarily rejoined the band only for the summer festival appearances until a new guitarist was found. The sixteenth album Steelfactory was released on 31 August 2018, with the first single "Rising High" being made available for streaming. On 19 September 2018, bassist Fitty Wienhold announced his departure from U.D.O., but stated that he would remain with the band if needed. The band soon recruited German guitarist Dee Dammers and Slovenian bassist Tilen Hudrap as their new members.

During U.D.O.'s touring in Europe in early 2019, Dirkschneider performed as a handicap after experiencing left knee pain. He vowed to continue without doctors' advice and without causing disappointment to the fans. The band was originally scheduled to perform at the Wacken Open Air festival in 2020 by performing Accept's 1985 album Metal Heart in its entirety to celebrate its 35th anniversary, with the addition of Das Musikkorps der Bundeswehr, but was cancelled due to the COVID-19 pandemic. Instead, they would collaborate together to record the seventeenth studio album We Are One, which was released on 17 July 2020. It reached number 8 in the official German album charts, the second highest position for any U.D.O album in 34 years, right after Steelfactory, which peaked at number 7.

The sixth live album Live In Bulgaria 2020 – Pandemic Survival Show was released on 19 March 2021, which was recorded live on 18 September 2020 in front of 2500 fans in Plovdiv. The eighteenth studio album Game Over was released on 22 October 2021.

In September 2022, bassist Tilen Hudrap got injured in Munich while playing a show during the Game Over world tour. Former Accept bassist Peter Baltes would step in as the temporary member. Hudrap announced his departure from the band soon after. In April 2023, Baltes was announced as the band's new bassist. The nineteenth studio album Touchdown was released on 25 August 2023.

On 17 October 2025, the band announced the departure of guitarist Andrey Smirnov. He would be replaced with new guitarist Alen Brentini. During the 25 July 2026 show at the Pyraser Classic Rock Night in Thalmässing, Baltes and Brentini suffered injuries after a fall on stage. According to the press statement, Brentini sustained several severe contusions and other injuries, but was able to continue performing, while Baltes suffered three fractured ribs and was hospitalized and was unable to continue performing for an extended period of time. The twentieth studio album Voodoo Ranger will be released on 8 January 2027. A music video for the song "I'll Die Trying" was made available for streaming.

== Dirkschneider ==
In 2015, Udo Dirkschneider announced that he would embark on a special tour in 2016, stating that he would no longer perform Accept songs in the live shows. During this tour, U.D.O. would perform under the name Dirkschneider, consisting of only the songs from Udo's time in the band. They began the Back to the Roots – Farewell to Accept tour in North America in 2017, returning for a second time in 2018. A 2-CD live album titled Live – Back to the Roots recorded in Memmingen was released on 28 October 2016, while another live album titled Live – Back to the Roots – Accepted! was released on 4 August 2017, featuring both an audio recording and a video recording of their performance from Brno, Czech Republic. They performed the songs for another year, due to the fans' request. In 2018, the Dirkschneider band was put to a close as Udo did not want to cause confusion between U.D.O. and this band, opting to continue with U.D.O. Due to continued interest, the band would perform under the Dirkschneider name only on an occasion.

On 28 February 2025, the band released a reimagined version of Accept's Balls to the Wall album titled Balls To The Wall - Reloaded in celebration of its 40th anniversary, featuring a star-studded roster of various musicians. They would embark on a tour in support of the album.

The band is scheduled to perform at the Hell's Heroes music festival in Houston in March 2026.

== Band members ==
Current

- Udo Dirkschneider – vocals (1987–1992, 1996–present)
- Sven Dirkschneider – drums, backing vocals (2015–present)
- Dee Dammers – guitars, backing vocals (2018–present)
- Peter Baltes – bass, backing vocals (2023–present)
- Alen Brentini – guitars, backing vocals (2025–present)

== Discography ==
- Animal House (1987)
- Mean Machine (1989)
- Faceless World (1990)
- Timebomb (1991)
- Solid (1997)
- No Limits (1998)
- Holy (1999)
- Man and Machine (2002)
- Thunderball (2004)
- Mission No. X (2005)
- Mastercutor (2007)
- Dominator (2009)
- Rev-Raptor (2011)
- Steelhammer (2013)
- Decadent (2015)
- Steelfactory (2018)
- We Are One (2020)
- Game Over (2021)
- Touchdown (2023)
- Voodoo Ranger (2027)

== See also ==
- Darxon
- Kreator
- Sinner
- Gravestone
- Saxon
- Teutonic thrash metal
