= Udo Dirkschneider =

German heavy metal singer

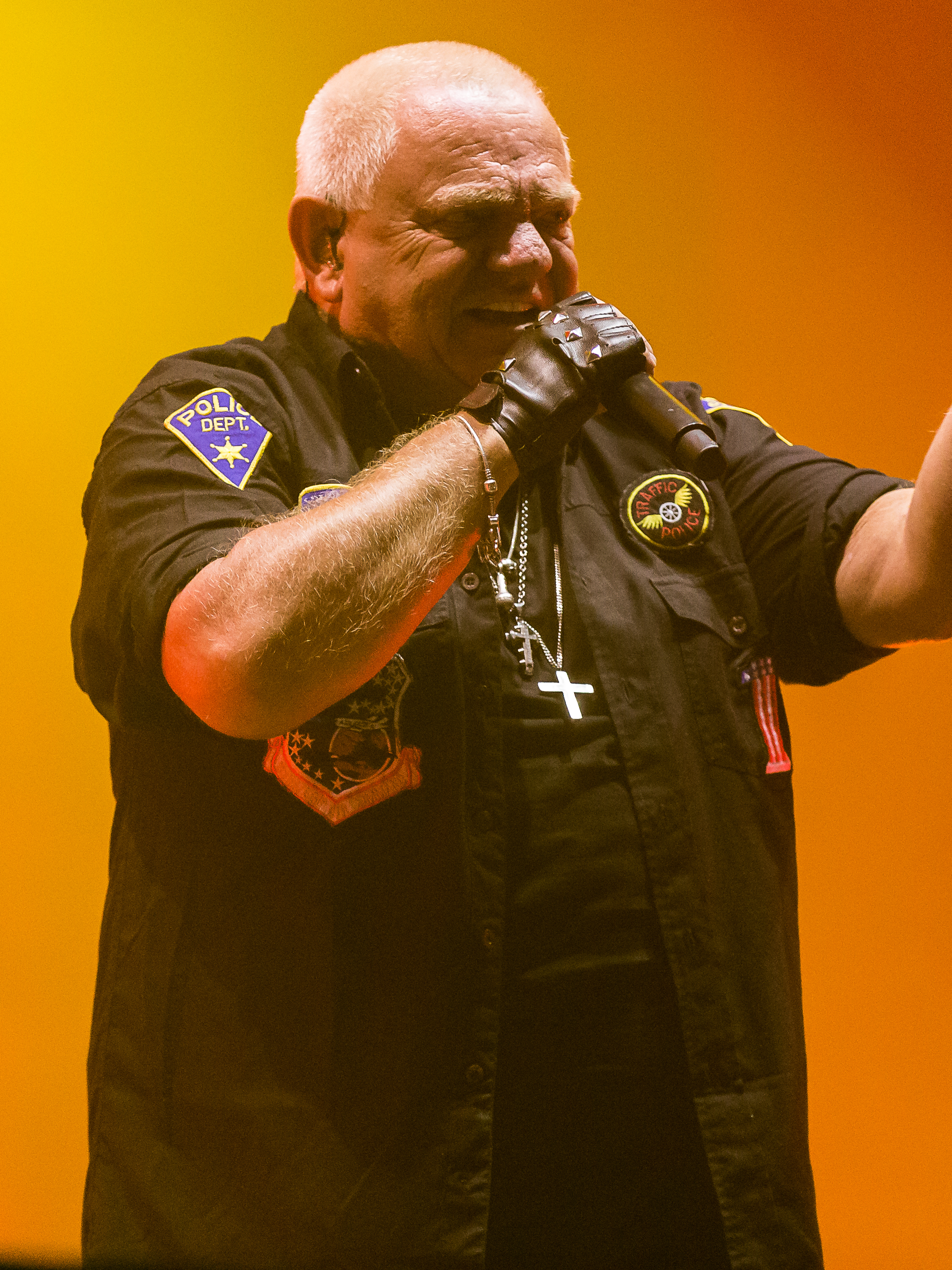
- Dirkschneider performing with U.D.O. in 2019

Background information
- Born: 6 April 1952 (age 74); Wuppertal, West Germany
- Genre: Heavy metal
- Occupations: Singer; songwriter
- Years active: 1968–present
- Member of: U.D.O.; Dirkschneider
- Formerly of: Accept

Udo Dirkschneider (born 6 April 1952) is a German singer who first rose to fame with the heavy metal band Accept. After leaving the band in 1987, he formed the band U.D.O., in which he has also enjoyed commercial success.

== Biography ==
In November 2011, Dirkschneider's son Sven supported U.D.O. on a date in Germany and became a permanent member of his father's band in February 2015. On the same year, the band was temporary renamed as "Dirkschneider" and embarked in a long tour called "Back To The Roots" where the band only performed Accept songs.

In 2021, Udo along with his former Accept bandmates, guitarist Stefan Kaufmann and bassist Peter Baltes released new music under the name of "Dirkschneider and the Old Gang" that also features former U.D.O guitarist Matthias Dieth, drummer Svein Dirkschneider and singer Manuela Bibert, with the video of the song "Where The Angels Fly" surpassing a million of views on YouTube.

On 22 April 2022, Udo released an album of cover versions, entitled 'My Way', to mark his 70th birthday.

Live in Bulgaria 2020: Pandemic Survival Show 18 September 2020, Plovdiv, Bulgaria, Roman theatre of Philippopolis.

=== Duets ===
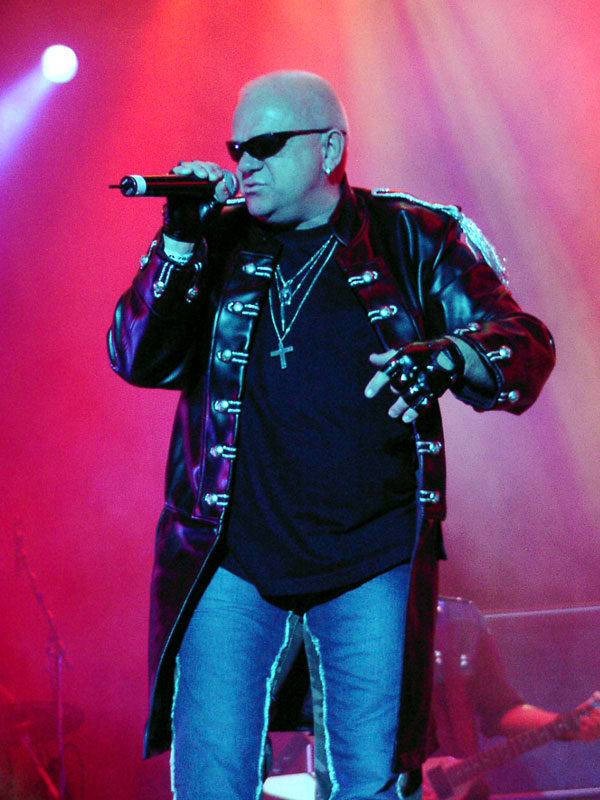
Dirkschneider performing in 2005

In his long career, Dirkschneider shared his vocals with a few artists, as in the cover of Steppenwolf's "Born to Be Wild" released in 1983 as B-side of "Break the Chain" single on Raven's All for One album. Dirkschneider is also famous for his duet with his longtime friend Doro Pesch on the song "Dancing with an Angel". In 1999, Dirkschneider recorded the Helloween song "I Want Out" and a new version of Accept's "Head Over Heels" with HammerFall. And as guest on the song music "Shtil" by the Russian heavy metal band Aria on their 2001's album Chimera.

In 2006, Dirkschneider sang the song "They Only Come Out at Night" with Mr. Lordi on Lordi album The Arockalypse, as well as performing it live on stage the same year Wacken Open Air.

In 2013, Dirkschneider performed a duet with Marko Hietala on Finnish band Lazy Bonez's debut album Vol.1. They sang a song called "First to Go – Last to Know".

== Discography ==
=== Accept ===
==== Studio albums ====
- Accept (1979)
- I'm a Rebel (1980)
- Breaker (1981)
- Restless and Wild (1982)
- Balls to the Wall (1983)
- Metal Heart (1985)
- Russian Roulette (1986)
- Objection Overruled (1993)
- Death Row (1994)
- Predator (1996)

==== Live albums ====
- Staying a Life (Live recording from 1985, released 1990)
- All Areas – Worldwide (Live from 1994 and 1995, released 1997)

==== EPs ====
- Kaizoku-Ban (Live EP, 1985)
- Rich & Famous (EP, 2002)

=== U.D.O. ===
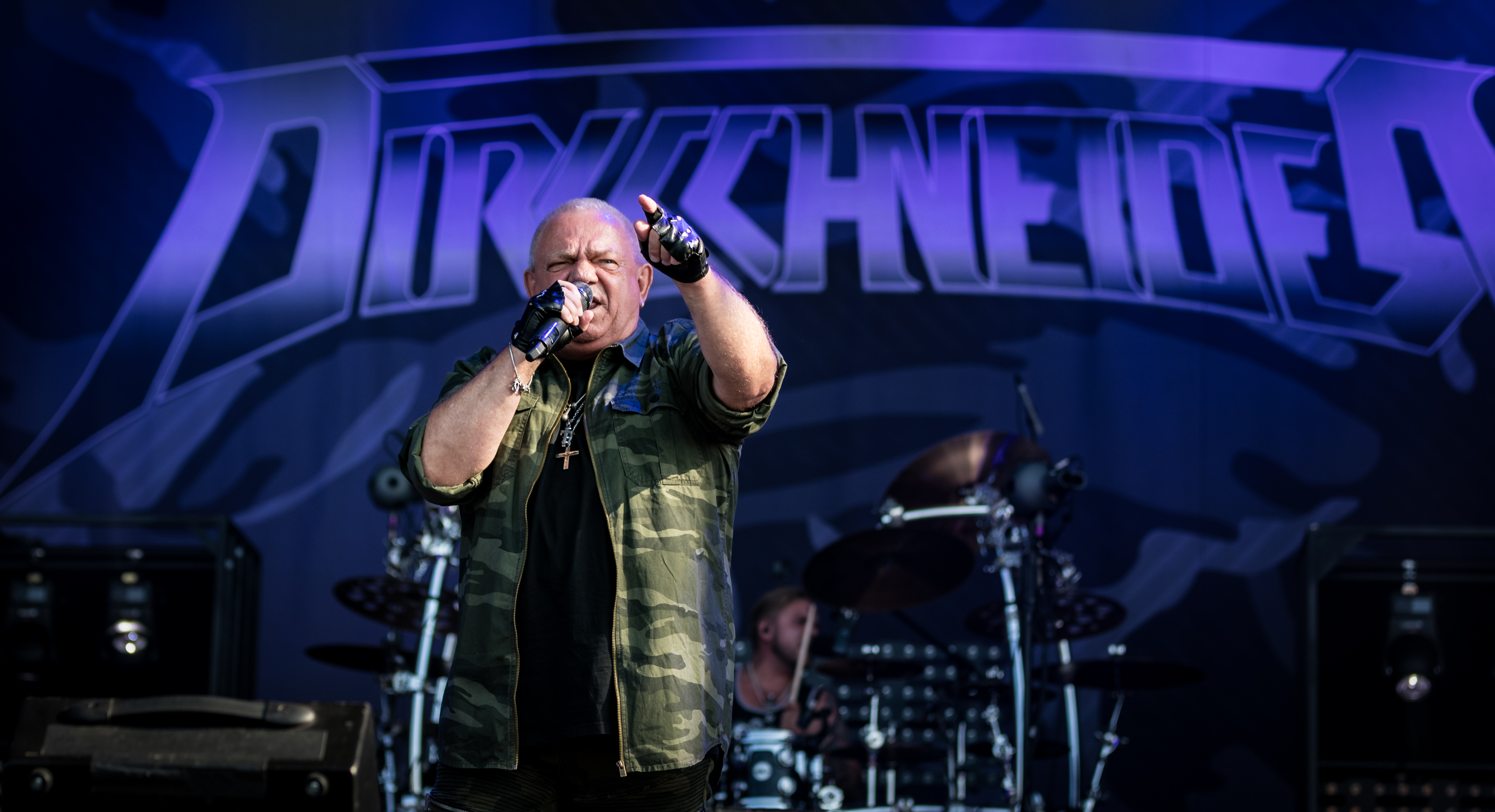
Dirkschneider at Wacken Open Air 2018

==== Studio albums ====
- Animal House (1987)
- Mean Machine (1989)
- Faceless World (1990)
- Timebomb (1991)
- Solid (1997)
- No Limits (1998)
- Holy (1999)
- Man and Machine (2002)
- Thunderball (2004)
- Mission No. X (2005)
- Mastercutor (2007)
- Dominator (2009)
- Rev-Raptor (2011)
- Steelhammer (2013)
- Decadent (2015)
- Steelfactory (2018)
- We Are One (2020) (with Das Musikkorps der Bundeswehr)
- Game Over (2021)
- My Way (2022) (Cover Album, released as solo record)
- Touchdown (2023)
- Balls to the Wall Reloaded (2025) (as Dirkschneider, re-recorded version of Accept album with various guest singers)
- Babylon (2025) (as Dirkschneider & The Old Gang)

==== Live albums ====
- Live from Russia (2001)
- Nailed to Metal – The Missing Tracks (2003)
- Mastercutor Alive (2008)
- Live in Sofia (2011)
- Steelhammer - Live from Moscow (2014)
- Live – Back to the Roots (2016) (as Dirkschneider)
- Live – Back to the Roots – Accepted! (Live in Brno) (2017) (as Dirkschneider)

==== Compilation albums ====
- Best Of (1999)
- Metallized (2007)
- Celebrator (2012)

==== Singles/EPs ====
- They Want War (1988)
- Heart of Gold (1990)
- Faceless World (1990)
- Two Faced Woman (1997)
- Independence Day (1997)
- Lovemachine (1998)
- Dancing with an Angel (2002)
- 24/7 EP (2005)
- The Wrong Side of Midnight EP (2007)
- Infected EP (2009)
- Leatherhead EP (2011)
- Steelhammer (2013)
- Decadent (2014)
- Arising (2021) (as Dirkschneider & The Old Gang)

==== Music videos ====
- They Want War (1988)
- Break the Rules (1989)
- Heart of Gold (1990)
- Independence Day (1997)
- Dancing with an Angel (with Doro Pesch) (2002)
- Thunderball (2004)
- Blind Eyes (2004)
- The Arbiter (2004)
- Trainride to Russia (2004)
- Mean Streets (2005)
- The Wrong Side of Midnight (2007)
- Black and White (2009)
- Leatherhead (2011)
- I Give As Good As I Get (2011)
- Metal Machine (2013)
- Heavy Rain (2013)
- Decadent (2014)

==== DVDs ====
- Nailed to Metal – The Complete History (2003)
- Thundervision (2004)
- Mastercutor Alive (2008)
- Live in Sofia (2012)
- Steelhammer – Live from Moscow (2014)
- Navy Metal Night (2015) "Special Show with Orchestra"
- Pandemic Survival Show (2020) Plovdiv

=== Guest appearances ===
Raven

- All for One (1983), song "Break The Chain"

Accept

- Eat the Heat (1989), song "Stand 4 What U R"

Alex Parche Project

- Son Of A Healer (1993), song "Gate Patrol"

Aria

- Chimera (2000), song "Shtil"

HammerFall

- Masterpieces (2008), Helloween's song "I Want Out" and Accept's song "Head Over Heels"

Lazy Bonez

- Vol.1 (2013), song "First to Go - Last to Know", duet with Marko Hietala

Manimal

- Trapped in the Shadows (2015), song "The Journey"

Axel Rudi Pell

- Ghost Town (2026), song “Breaking Seals”

Lordi

- The Arockalypse (2006), song They Only Come Out at Night (Lordi song)
