= Stefan Kaufmann (musician) =

German drummer and guitarist

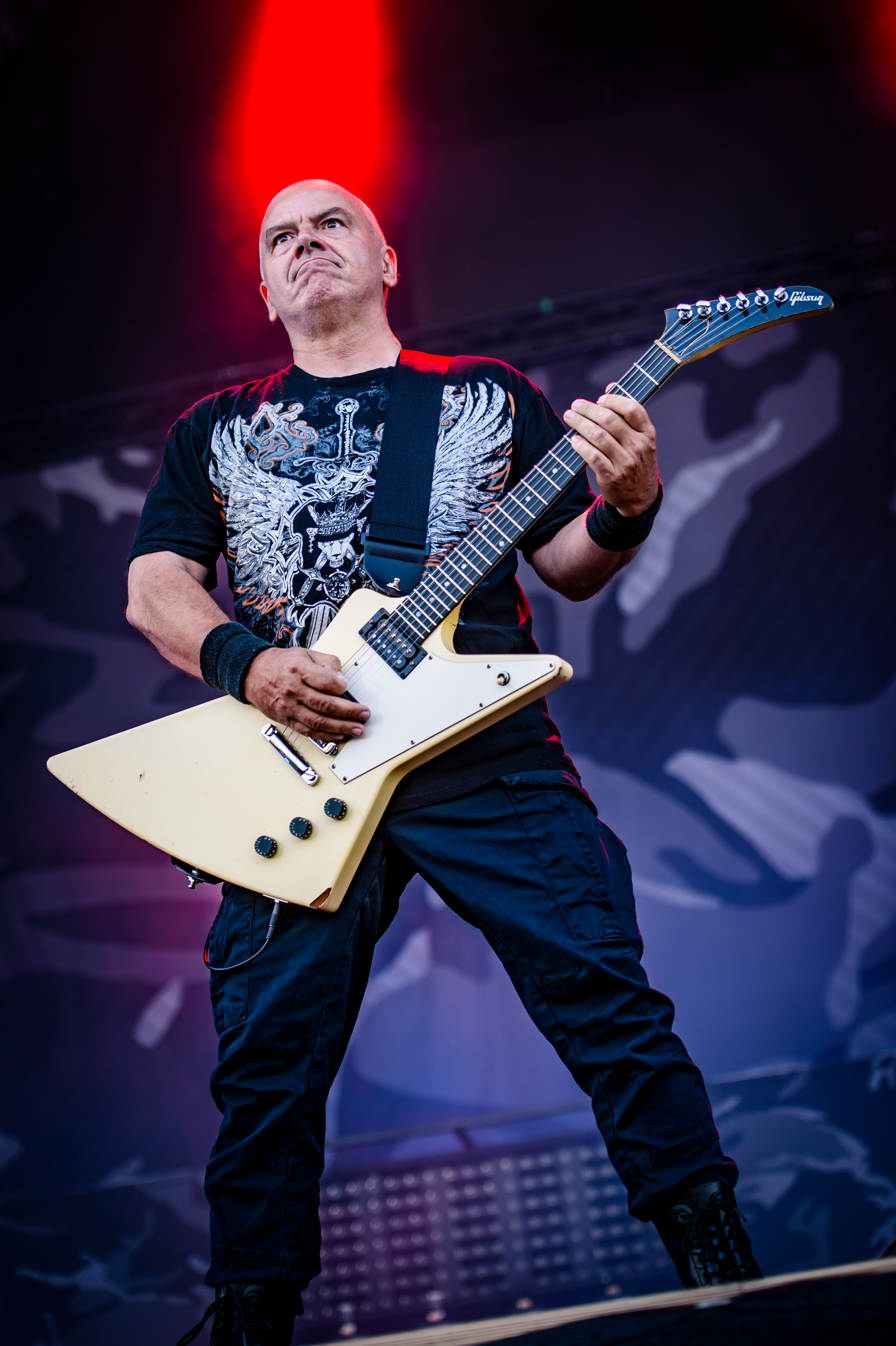
- Kaufmann performing in 2018

Background information
- Born: 4 August 1960 (age 66)
- Origin: Solingen, West Germany
- Genre: Heavy metal
- Occupation: Musician
- Instruments: Drums, guitar

Stefan Kaufmann (born 4 August 1960) is a German drummer and guitarist, best known as a member of the heavy metal bands Accept and U.D.O.

== Career ==
He joined Accept as drummer early enough to appear on the cover photos for their debut album, but too late to record the drums for the album (that was done by Frank Friedrich). After drumming on nine albums he had to give up drumming towards the end of Accept's career due to health problems.

Kaufmann has produced the live albums Staying a Life and All Areas - Worldwide for Accept and contributed significantly to Accept's songwriting. He has worked extensively as a record producer for other bands. He produced or co-produced every U.D.O. album from 1990 until 2011.

Stefan Kaufmann joined Accept's singer Udo Dirkschneider in his band U.D.O. as guitar player in 1996, following Accept's second breakup, and has recorded seven albums with them. On 13 September 2012, it was announced that Kaufman has ceased playing in U.D.O. for health reasons, though he continued to work with the band in other capacities. In June 2018, Stefan Kaufmann rejoined the band, but serving only as a temporary replacement for the festival appearances, including the SummerBreeze/Rockpalast, until a new guitarist would be announced.

During his tenure with Accept, Kaufmann used Tama drums. He was also one of the first drummers to use Meinl cymbals when they first became widely manufactured and sold in the late 1970s.

== Discography ==
=== Accept ===
Studio albums

- I'm a Rebel (1980)
- Breaker (1981)
- Restless and Wild (1982)
- Balls to the Wall (1983)
- Metal Heart (1985)
- Russian Roulette (1986)
- Eat the Heat (1989)
- Objection Overruled (1993)
- Death Row (1994)

Live albums

- Kaizoku-Ban (1985)
- Staying a Life (1990)

=== U.D.O. ===
Studio albums

- Solid (1997)
- No Limits (1998)
- Holy (1999)
- Man and Machine (2002)
- Thunderball (2004)
- Mission No. X (2005)
- Mastercutor (2007)
- Dominator (2009)
- Rev-Raptor (2011)

Live albums

- Live from Russia (2001)
- Nailed to Metal - The Missing Tracks (2003)
- Mastercutor Live (2008)

EPs

- Two Faced Woman (1997)
- Independence Day (1997)
- Lovemachine (1998)
- Dancing with an Angel (2002)
- 24/7 (2005)
- The Wrong Side of Midnight (2007)
