= Pulheim =

- Town
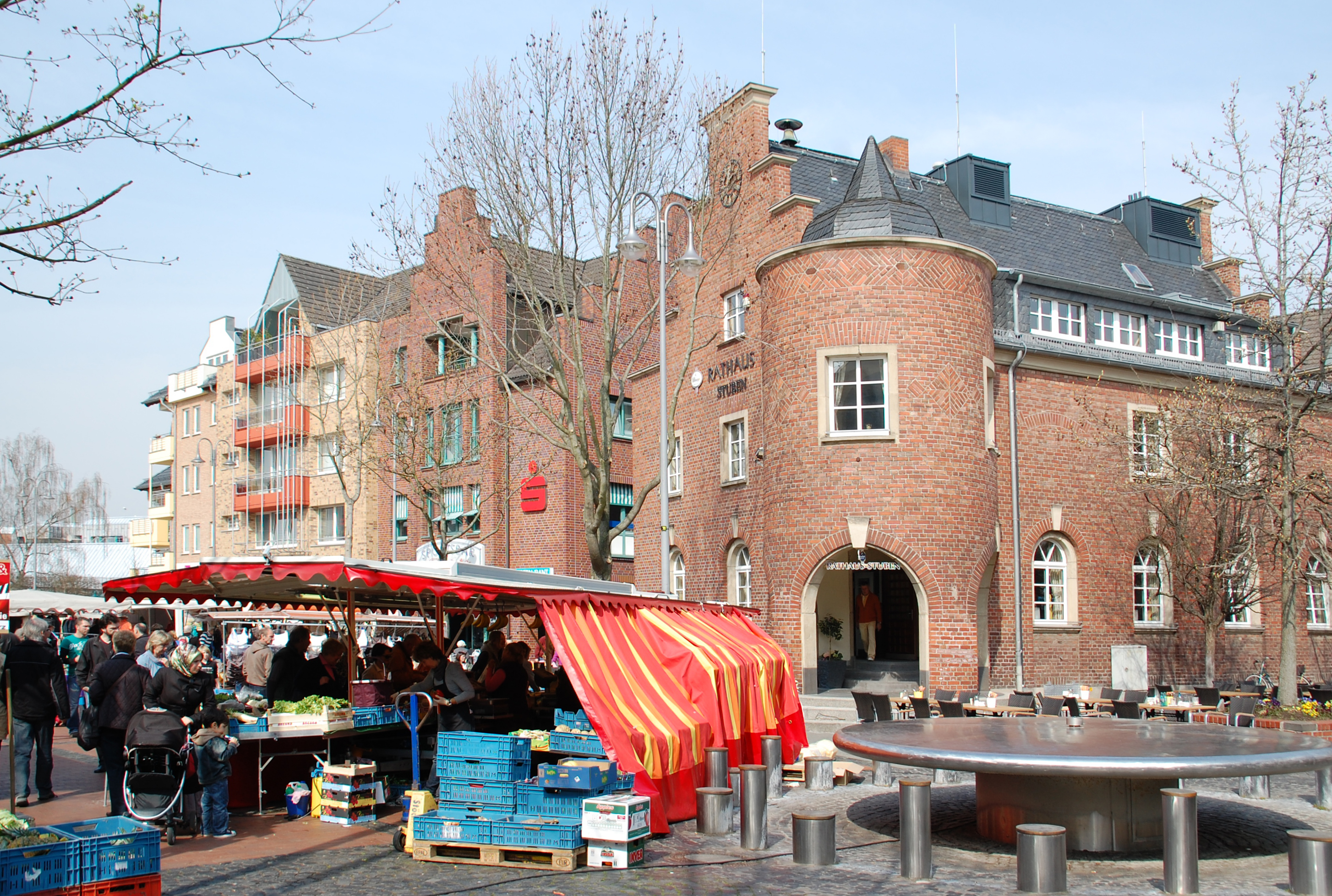

- Coat of arms

- Location of Pulheim within Rhein-Erft-Kreis district
- Interactive map of Pulheim
- Location within Germany Location within North Rhine-Westphalia
- Coordinates: 51°00′N 6°48′E
- Country: Germany
- State: North Rhine-Westphalia
- Admin. region: Köln
- District: Rhein-Erft-Kreis
- Subdivisions: 12

Government
  - Mayor (2020–25): Frank Keppeler (CDU)

Area
  - Total: 72.15 km^{2} (27.86 sq mi)
- Elevation: 49 m (161 ft)

Population (2025-12-31)
  - Total: 55,979
  - Density: 775.9/km^{2} (2,009/sq mi)
- Time zone: UTC+01:00 (CET)
  - Summer (DST): UTC+02:00 (CEST)
- Postal codes: 50239–50259
- Dialling codes: 02238; 02234 (Brauweiler, Dansweiler, Freimersdorf)
- Vehicle registration: BM
- Website: www.pulheim.de

Pulheim (German pronunciation: [ˈpʊlhaɪm]; Ripuarian: Pullem) is a town in the Rhein-Erft-Kreis, North Rhine-Westphalia, Germany.

Since the 1920s, a large substation of the Rheinisch-Westfälisches Elektrizitätswerk AG (RWE) is located at Pulheim. It is the end of the North–South Powerline and a large control center for the power grid of the RWE.

In the communal reform of 1975, several previously independent municipalities were added to the municipality Pulheim, which received city rights in 1981. Pulheim consists of 12 quarters (Stadtteile), including Brauweiler, Geyen and Stommeln.

== Population ==
Historical population

Year	Pop.	±% p.a.
1965	23,812	—
1970	29,678	+4.50%
1975	38,236	+5.20%
1980	44,858	+3.25%
1985	47,340	+1.08%
1990	49,353	+0.84%
1995	51,365	+0.80%

Year	Pop.	±% p.a.
2000	53,158	+0.69%
2005	53,694	+0.20%
2010	53,769	+0.03%
2015	54,200	+0.16%
2020	54,636	+0.16%
2025	55,979	+0.49%

Source: Landesdatabank Nordrhein-Westfalen

== Education ==
The following schools are in Pulheim:

- Dietrich-Bonhoeffer Primary School, Pulheim
- Catholic Primary School Barbara School, Pulheim
- Community Primary School “Am Buschweg”, formerly known as “Am Wäldchen”, Pulheim
- Richeza Community Primary School, Pulheim-Brauweiler
- Wolfhelm School (primary school), Pulheim-Dansweiler
- Community Primary School Sinnersdorf, Pulheim-Sinnersdorf
- Community Primary School Sinthern-Geyen, Pulheim-Sinthern
- Christina School (primary school), Pulheim-Stommeln
- Catholic Primary School “An der Kopfbuche”, Pulheim-Stommeln
- School at the Jahnstrasse, Pulheim
- Community high school (Hauptschule), Pulheim
- Marion-Dönhoff-Realschule (high school), Pulheim
- Arthur-Koepchen-Realschule (high school), Pulheim-Brauweiler
- Scholl-Siblings-Gymnasium (high school), Pulheim
- Abbey-Gymnasium (high school), Pulheim-Brauweiler
- Papst-Johannes XXIII-Schule (Italian: Scuola Papa Giovanni XXIII; "Pope John XXIII School") (high school), Pulheim-Stommeln
- School for Handicapped Donatus-School (primary and high school), Pulheim-Brauweiler

== Economy ==
- RWE
- RWE Power AG

== Sport ==
- Pulheimer SC
- Linde German Masters, golf
- FFC Brauweiler
- SC Germania Geyen, football club
- TUS Schwarz Weiss Brauweiler
- Pulheim Gophers Baseballteam
- The Raging Abbots Baseballteam
- Reha-Sport-Verein

== Twin towns – sister cities ==
Pulheim is twinned with:

- Fareham, England, United Kingdom
- Guidel, France
