= The Collection (Accept album) =

Greatest hits album by Accept
- Released: 1991
- Recorded: 1979–1986
- Genre: Heavy metal
- Label: Castle

Professional ratings
Review scores
Source	Rating
AllMusic	4/5 stars

The Collection is a compilation album by German heavy metal band Accept, released in 1991. The songs on the album were pulled from Accept's albums Accept, I'm a Rebel, Breaker, Restless and Wild, Balls to the Wall, Metal Heart, and Russian Roulette. It omits anything from Eat the Heat, which was released two years before this compilation album.

== Track listing ==
No.	Title	Writer(s)	Original album	Length
1.	"Lady Lou"	Dirkschneider, Baltes, Hoffmann, Fischer, Friedrich	Accept (1979)	3:03
2.	"I'm a Rebel"	George Alexander	I'm a Rebel (1980)	3:57
3.	"Thunder and Lightning"	Dirkschneider, Baltes, Hoffmann, Fischer, Kaufmann	I'm a Rebel (1980)	4:01
4.	"Breaker"	Dirkschneider, Hoffmann, Fischer, Baltes, Kaufmann	Breaker (1981)	3:35
5.	"Burning"	Dirkschneider, Hoffmann, Fischer, Baltes, Kaufmann	Breaker (1981)	5:01
6.	"Son of a Bitch"	Dirkschneider, Hoffmann, Fischer, Baltes, Kaufmann	Breaker (1981)	3:55
7.	"Fast as a Shark"	Hoffmann, Kaufmann, Dirkschneider, Baltes	Restless and Wild (1982)	3:49
8.	"Restless and Wild"	Hoffmann, Kaufmann, Dirkschneider, Baltes, Robert A. Smith-Diesel	Restless and Wild (1982)	4:10
9.	"Princess of the Dawn"	Hoffmann, Kaufmann, Dirkschneider, Baltes, Smith-Diesel, Deaffy	Restless and Wild (1982)	6:15
10.	"Balls to the Wall"	Dirkschneider, Hoffmann, Frank, Kaufmann, Baltes, Deaffy	Balls to the Wall (1983)	5:42
11.	"London Leatherboys"	Dirkschneider, Hoffmann, Frank, Kaufmann, Baltes, Deaffy	Balls to the Wall (1983)	5:10
12.	"Love Child"	Dirkschneider, Hoffmann, Frank, Kaufmann, Baltes, Deaffy	Balls to the Wall (1983)	3:34
13.	"Metal Heart"	Dirkschneider, Hoffmann, Kaufmann, Baltes, Fischer, Deaffy	Metal Heart (1985)	5:19
14.	"Up to the Limit"	Dirkschneider, Hoffmann, Kaufmann, Baltes, Fischer, Deaffy	Metal Heart (1985)	3:47
15.	"Screaming for a Love-Bite"	Dirkschneider, Hoffmann, Kaufmann, Baltes, Fischer, Deaffy	Metal Heart (1985)	4:06
16.	"Monsterman"	Dirkschneider, Hoffmann, Fischer, Baltes, Kaufmann, Deaffy	Russian Roulette (1986)	3:24
17.	"T.V. War"	Dirkschneider, Hoffmann, Fischer, Baltes, Kaufmann, Deaffy	Russian Roulette (1986)	3:26
18.	"The King"	Dirkschneider, Baltes, Hoffmann, Fischer, Kaufmann, Dirk Steffens	I'm a Rebel (1980)	4:10
Total length:				1:16:24

== Personnel ==
- Udo Dirkschneider – lead vocals (tracks 1–17)
- Wolf Hoffmann – guitar (all tracks)
- Jörg Fischer – guitar (tracks 1–6, 13–18)
- Peter Baltes – bass guitar (all tracks), lead vocals (track 18)
- Stefan Kaufmann – drums (tracks 2–18)
- Herman Frank – guitar (tracks 7–12)
- Frank Friedrich – drums (track 1)
