= Best of Accept =

Greatest hits album by Accept
- Released: 1983
- Recorded: 1979–1983
- Genre: Heavy metal
- Label: Brain

Best of Accept is a compilation album by German heavy metal band Accept, released in 1983. The songs on the album were pulled from Accept's earliest four solo albums, namely Accept, I'm a Rebel, Breaker, and Restless and Wild, which was released during the following year. This album omits more distinctive songs from the band's later years, such as those from their 1983 album Balls to the Wall.

A Greek edition of the album in 1984 included two tracks recorded at Monsters of Rock in Donington on August 18, 1984.

== Track listing ==
No.	Title	Length
1.	"Burning"	5:08
2.	"Restless and Wild"	4:12
3.	"Son of a Bitch"	3:44
4.	"Breaker"	3:35
5.	"Do It"	4:11
6.	"I'm a Rebel"	3:58
7.	"China Lady"	3:56
8.	"No Time to Lose"	4:35
9.	"Princess of the Dawn"	6:17
10.	"Lady Lou"	3:02
Total length:		42:38

Greek edition bonus tracks
No.	Title	Length
1.	"Princess of the Dawn" (Live)
2.	"Fast as a Shark" (Live)

== Personnel ==
- Udo Dirkschneider – lead vocals (tracks 1–7, 9–10, live tracks)
- Wolf Hoffmann – guitar (all tracks)
- Jörg Fischer – guitar (tracks 1, 3–8, 10)
- Peter Baltes – bass guitar (all tracks), lead vocals (track 8)
- Stefan Kaufmann – drums (tracks 1–9, live tracks)
- Herman Frank – guitar (tracks 2, 9, live tracks)
- Frank Friedrich – drums (track 10)
