= Restless: The Best =

Greatest hits album by Accept
- Released: December 1994
- Recorded: 1980–1982
- Genre: Heavy metal
- Label: Metronome Music GmbH

Professional ratings
Review scores
Source	Rating
AllMusic	4.5/5 stars

Restless: The Best is a compilation album by German heavy metal band Accept, released in 1982. The songs are from 1980's I'm a Rebel, 1981's Breaker and 1982's Restless and Wild.

== Track listing ==
No.	Title	Length
1.	"Restless and Wild"	4:10
2.	"I'm a Rebel"	3:57
3.	"Save Us"	4:33
4.	"Son of a Bitch"	3:55
5.	"Fast as a Shark"	3:48
6.	"Thunder and Lightning"	4:01
7.	"China Lady"	3:56
8.	"I Wanna Be No Hero"	4:00
9.	"The King"	4:10
10.	"Get Ready"	3:49
11.	"Ahead of the Pack"	3:22
12.	"No Time to Lose"	4:35
13.	"Burning"	5:15
14.	"Feelings"	4:48
15.	"Midnight Highway"	3:58
16.	"Breaking Up Again"	4:39
17.	"Flash Rockin' Man"	4:24
18.	"Neon Nights"	6:00
Total length:		1:17:30

== Personnel ==
- Udo Dirkschneider – lead vocals (tracks 1–8, 10 & 11, 13–18)
- Wolf Hoffmann – guitar (all tracks)
- Jörg Fischer – guitar (tracks 2–4, 6–9, 12–16)
- Peter Baltes – bass guitar (all tracks), lead vocals (tracks 9 & 12), additional vocals (track 3)
- Stefan Kaufmann – drums (all tracks)
- Herman Frank – guitar (tracks 1, 5, 10, 11, 17 & 18)
