= Staying a Life =

1990 Live Album by Accept

Live album by Accept
- Released: 21 October 1990
- Recorded: 18 September 1985
- Venue: Festival Hall, Osaka, Japan
- Genre: Heavy metal
- Length: 96:18
- Label: RCA/BMG Ariola (Europe); Epic (US)
- Producer: Stefan Kaufmann

Accept chronology
Eat the Heat (1989)	Staying a Life (1990)	Objection Overruled (1993)

Professional ratings
Review scores
Source	Rating
AllMusic	3.5/5 stars

Staying a Life is a double live album by Accept, released in 1990. It was recorded in Osaka, Japan, in 1985. It was released in 1990, shortly after the band's first breakup. It was mixed by Uli Baronowsky at Dierks Studios, Stommeln. Live footage from the 1985–1986 world tour was released in VHS also in 1990, with the same title and cover art. "Neon Nights", "Burning", "Head Over Heels", and "Outro (Bound to Fail)" are omitted from the single disc edition.

== Track listings ==
Music and words by Accept & Deaffy

European edition

Disc one
No.	Title	Length
1.	"Metal Heart"	5:25
2.	"Breaker"	3:40
3.	"Screaming for a Love-Bite"	4:22
4.	"Up to the Limit"	4:45
5.	"Living for Tonite"	3:35
6.	"Princess of the Dawn"	7:49
7.	"Neon Nights"	8:17
8.	"Burning"	7:29
Total length:		45:22

Disc two
No.	Title	Length
1.	"Head Over Heels"	5:48
2.	"Guitar Solo Wolf"	4:27
3.	"Restless and Wild"	2:34
4.	"Son of a Bitch"	2:35
5.	"London Leatherboys"	3:54
6.	"Love Child"	5:01
7.	"Flash Rockin' Man"	5:08
8.	"Dogs on Leads"	5:52
9.	"Fast as a Shark"	4:09
10.	"Balls to the Wall"	10:19
11.	"Outro (Bound to Fail)"	1:09
Total length:		50:56

US edition

No.	Title	Length
1.	"Metal Heart"	5:25
2.	"Breaker"	3:40
3.	"Screaming for a Love-Bite"	4:22
4.	"Up to the Limit"	4:45
5.	"Living for Tonite"	3:35
6.	"Princess of the Dawn"	7:49
7.	"Guitar Solo Wolf"	4:27
8.	"Restless and Wild"	2:34
9.	"Son of a Bitch"	2:35
10.	"London Leatherboys"	3:54
11.	"Love Child"	5:01
12.	"Flash Rockin' Man"	5:08
13.	"Dogs on Leads"	5:52
14.	"Fast as a Shark"	4:09
15.	"Balls to the Wall"	10:19
Total length:		1:13:35

Staying a Life

Video by Accept
- Released: 1990
- Recorded: World Tour 1985–1986
- Genre: Heavy metal
- Length: 65 min
- Label: PolyGram
- Producer: Stefan Kaufmann

Accept chronology
Staying a Life (1990)	Metal Blast from the Past (2002)

== VHS track listing ==
No.	Title	Length
1.	"Metal Heart"
2.	"Breaker"
3.	"Screaming for a Love-Bite"
4.	"Up to the Limit"
5.	"Living for Tonite"
6.	"Princess of the Dawn"
7.	"Restless and Wild"
8.	"Son of a Bitch"
9.	"London Leatherboys"
10.	"Fast as a Shark"
11.	"Balls to the Wall"
12.	"Bound to Fail/Outro"

== Credits ==
Band members

- Udo Dirkschneider – vocals
- Wolf Hoffmann – guitars
- Jörg Fischer – guitars
- Peter Baltes – bass guitar
- Stefan Kaufmann – drums, producer
