= Ein Heller und ein Batzen =

German folk song

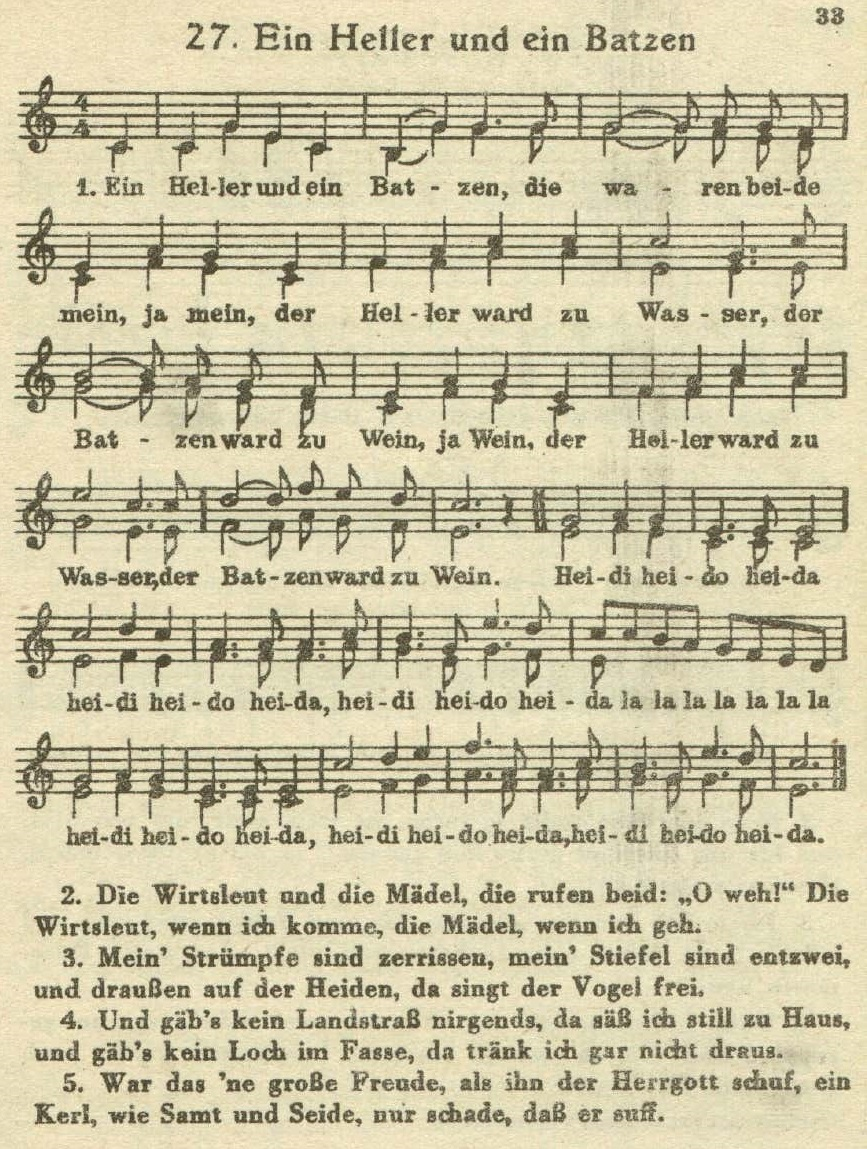
"Ein Heller und ein Batzen" in Das neue Soldaten-Liederbuch. Die bekanntesten und meistgesungenen Lieder unserer Wehrmacht. Mainz 1938

"Ein Heller und ein Batzen", also known by its chorus of "Heidi, heido, heida", (with all three words being modifications of the name Adelheid) is a German folk song. Written by Albert von Schlippenbach in the 1820s as a student drinking song, it later became a popular marching song in the Wehrmacht during the Second World War.

== History ==
Franz Theodor Kugler set Schlippenbach's poem as a commercium song in 1830. While the poem was published in several collections, Kugler's melody did not receive popular success. Gottfried Wilhelm Fink wrote a new melody in 1853 This version was also published in Franz Magnus Böhme's Volksthümliche Lieder der Deutschen im 18. und 19. Jahrhundert and the Allgemeines Deutsches Kommersbuch The only melody used now appeared in the 20th century and was popular in the Wandervogel movement. This version was also published in the 1938 Neues Soldaten-Liederbuch [New soldiers' songbook].

The words heller and batzen refer to two Swiss/southern German coins, similar to penny and threepence.

== Lyrics ==
Ein Heller und ein Batzen,
die waren beide mein,
der Heller ward zu Wasser,
der Batzen ward zu Wein.
Refrain:
𝄆 Heidi, heido, heida, 𝄇
heidi, heido, heida, la la la la la la la,
𝄆 Heidi, heido, heida, 𝄇 (3×)

Die Wirtsleut und die Mädel,
die rufen beid: Oh weh!
Die Wirtsleut, wenn ich komme,
die Mädel, wenn ich geh.
Refrain

Meine Strümpfe sind zerrissen,
meine Stiefel sind entzwei,
und draußen auf der Heide,
da singt der Vogel frei.
Refrain

Und gäb's kein Landstraß nirgends,
da säß ich still zu Haus,
und gäb's kein Loch im Fasse,
da tränk ich gar nicht draus.
Refrain

War das 'ne große Freude,
als ihn der Herrgott schuf;
ein Kerl, wie Samt und Seide,
nur schade, daß er suff.
Refrain

A heller and a batzen,
they were both mine,
the heller went for water,
the batzen went for wine.
Refrain

The innkeepers and the girls,
both shout: Oh no!
The innkeepers when I come,
the girls when I leave.
Refrain

My socks are ripped,
my boots have come apart,
and out in the brush
the bird sings freely.
Refrain

And were there no country roads,
I'd be sitting quietly at home,
and were there no hole in the barrel,
I wouldn't be drinking from it.
Refrain

Wasn't it a great joy
when the Lord God created him,
a guy like velvet and silk;
just a pity that he drank.
Refrain

== Controversy ==
"Ein Heller und ein Batzen" was a popular marching song during the Second World War among the Wehrmacht troops invading Europe, which led to it entering popular recognition as a Nazi symbol. Association with Nazism is particularly strong in Poland, which was brutally invaded and occupied by the Third Reich at the very beginning of the War, to the point that the song is regarded as the de facto hymn of the Wehrmacht and is often referred to as "Heili, heilo, heila"; a reference to the song as a symbolic Nazi theme can be seen, for example, in the 1946 (and thus immediately post-war) film Forbidden Songs (Zakazane piosenki) which recreates a typical performance of the song by marching Wehrmacht columns. Even so, it is not formally recognized as a Nazi symbol in Germany and is therefore not outlawed per Article 86a of the German Criminal Code that prohibits the dissemination of signs of unconstitutional organizations.

On 6 August 2023, during the annual St. Dominic's Fair in the Polish city of Gdańsk, there was a scandal related to a performance of the song by a German folk group from Middle Franconia. The performance was conducted outside the fair's official programme and in its original folk context, but, in addition to Polish sensitivity to the song in general, that performance coincided with commemorations of the 1944 Warsaw Uprising. After the reaction and indignation of some circles in Poland, both the group and the district of Middle Franconia apologized to the Gdańsk city authorities and to Międzynarodowe Targi Gdańskie S.A., the fair's organisers.

== Modern interpretations ==
German schlager singer Heino included a version of this song on his 1968 album ...und Sehnsucht uns begleitet.

German heavy metal band Accept incorporated a recording of this song with a young producer Dieter Dierks singing as an intro to the song "Fast as a Shark" from their 1982 album Restless and Wild.
