= Russian Roulette (Accept album) =

Studio album by Accept
- Released: April 21st 1986
- Studios: Dierks (Stommeln, Germany)
- Genre: Heavy metal
- Length: 43:17
- Label: RCA
- Producer: Accept

Accept chronology
Kaizoku-Ban (1985)	Russian Roulette (1986)	Eat the Heat (1989)

Singles from Russian Roulette
- 1. "T.V. War" Released: June 1986 (Japan)

Professional ratings
Review scores
Source	Rating
AllMusic	2.5/5 stars
Collector's Guide to Heavy Metal	7/10
Rock Hard	8.0/10

Russian Roulette is the seventh studio album by German heavy metal band Accept, released in 1986. It was again recorded at Dierks-Studios, but the band chose to self-produce rather than bring back Dieter Dierks as producer. It would be the last Accept album to feature Udo Dirkschneider as lead vocalist until the 1993 reunion album Objection Overruled.

The album returns Accept to the darker, heavier sound of releases prior to the more commercial-sounding predecessor Metal Heart. Wolf Hoffmann explained the band's decision: "Maybe we were trying sort of go back to our natural and not polished Accept sound with that record. We weren't really all that happy with the polished and clean-sounding Metal Heart. I was sort of very happy with my guitar playing on that record and very happy with my parts, but I remember the whole vibe of the band was at the time that we don't want to go through this again with Dieter Dierks who had produced Metal Heart."

Peter Baltes explained the album's title and front cover as an expression of the strong anti-war themes throughout the record, showing war as a game of Russian roulette: "It means - go and play the game y'know, what a silly game it is. One will die definitely."

The digitally remastered CD edition includes live versions of "Metal Heart" and "Screaming for a Love-Bite" as bonus tracks, taken from the Kaizoku-Ban EP. The 2014 release from UK based record label Hear No Evil Recordings features live versions of "Neon Nights", "Burning" and "Head Over Heels", taken from the 1990 live album Staying a Life.

== Track listing ==
All lyrics and music written by Accept and Deaffy.

Side one
No.	Title	Length
1.	"T.V. War"	3:29
2.	"Monsterman"	3:26
3.	"Russian Roulette"	5:22
4.	"It's Hard to Find a Way"	4:19
5.	"Aiming High"	4:24

Side two
No.	Title	Length
6.	"Heaven Is Hell"	7:12
7.	"Another Second to Be"	3:19
8.	"Walking in the Shadow"	4:27
9.	"Man Enough to Cry"	3:14
10.	"Stand Tight"	4:05
Total length:		43:17

2002 bonus tracks
No.	Title	Length
1.	"Metal Heart" (Live)	5:24
2.	"Screaming for a Love-Bite" (Live)	4:26
Total length:		53:07

2014 bonus tracks
No.	Title	Length
1.	"Neon Nights" (Live, Taken from Staying a Life)	8:14
2.	"Burning" (Live, Taken from Staying a Life)	7:29
3.	"Head Over Heels" (Live, Taken from Staying a Life)	5:41
Total length:		64:41

== Credits ==
Band members

- Udo Dirkschneider – vocals
- Wolf Hoffmann – guitars
- Jörg Fischer – guitars
- Peter Baltes – bass guitar
- Stefan Kaufmann – drums

Production

- Michael Wagener – engineer
- Mark Dodson – mixing
- Bob Ludwig – mastering at Masterdisk, New York
- Gaby "Deaffy" Hauke – cover concept
- Didi Zill Bravo – cover photo
- Produced and arranged by Accept for Breeze Music Gmbh

== Charts ==
Chart (1986)	Peak position
Australian Albums (Kent Music Report)	93
Finnish Albums (The Official Finnish Charts)	3
German Albums (Offizielle Top 100)	5
Japanese Albums (Oricon)	26
Norwegian Albums (VG-lista)	16
Swedish Albums (Sverigetopplistan)	9
Swiss Albums (Schweizer Hitparade)	23
UK Albums (Official Charts)	80
US Billboard 200	114

== See also ==
- List of anti-war songs
