= Stalingrad (Accept album) =

Studio album by Accept
- Released: 6 April 2012
- Recorded: 2011
- Genre: Heavy metal
- Length: 51:34
- Label: Nuclear Blast
- Producer: Andy Sneap

Accept chronology
Blood of the Nations (2010)	Stalingrad (2012)	Blind Rage (2014)

Stalingrad (subtitled Brothers in Death) is the 13th studio album by German heavy metal band Accept, which was released on 6 April 2012, by the independent German record label Nuclear Blast Records. It is their second album since their 2009 reunion, and like its predecessor, Blood of the Nations (2010), was produced by Andy Sneap.

== Reception ==
Professional ratings
Review scores
Source	Rating
AllMusic	3.5/5 stars
BW&BK	8.5/10 stars
Thrash Hits	5.5/6 stars

Critical reception of the album has been largely favorable. AllMusic published a review giving the album three-and-a-half stars out of five. Reviewer James Christopher Monger also noted that current vocalist Tornillo does an "awfully convincing Udo Dirkschneider impression." Brave Words & Bloody Knuckles and Thrash Hits also gave the album positive reviews.

The album was successful, debuting at number six on the German albums chart. Stalingrad also debuted at number 81 on the Billboard 200, becoming Accept's first album to crack the top 100 in the United States since Metal Heart (1985), which peaked at number 94.

The album was honored with a Metal Storm Award in 2012, when it was voted Best Heavy Metal/Melodic Album.

== Track listing ==
All tracks are written by Peter Baltes, Wolf Hoffmann, and Mark Tornillo.

Original Edition
No.	Title	Length
1.	"Hung, Drawn and Quartered"	4:36
2.	"Stalingrad"	6:00
3.	"Hellfire"	6:08
4.	"Flash to Bang Time"	4:08
5.	"Shadow Soldiers"	5:48
6.	"Revolution"	4:09
7.	"Against the World"	3:37
8.	"Twist of Fate"	5:31
9.	"The Quick and the Dead"	4:28
Total length:		44:20

Bonus Track
No.	Title	Length
10.	"Never Forget"	4:53
11.	"The Galley"	7:22
Total length:		56:33

== Personnel ==
Accept

- Mark Tornillo – vocals
- Wolf Hoffmann – guitar
- Herman Frank – guitar
- Peter Baltes – bass
- Stefan Schwarzmann – drums

Production

- Produced, engineered, mixed and mastered by Andy Sneap
- Cover/package design by Marc Whitaker

== Charts ==
Chart (2012)	Peak position
Austrian Albums (Ö3 Austria)	70
Belgian Albums (Ultratop Wallonia)	68
Finnish Albums (Suomen virallinen lista)	8
French Albums (SNEP)	77
German Albums (Offizielle Top 100)	6
Hungarian Albums (MAHASZ)	5
Italian Albums (FIMI)	95
Japanese Albums (Oricon)	80
Norwegian Albums (VG-lista)	22
Polish Albums (ZPAV)	46
Spanish Albums (Promusicae)	66
Swedish Albums (Sverigetopplistan)	10
Swiss Albums (Schweizer Hitparade)	17
UK Independent Albums (Official Charts)	17
UK Rock & Metal Albums (Official Charts)	16
US Billboard 200	81
US Independent Albums (Billboard)	13
US Top Hard Rock Albums (Billboard)	7
US Top Rock Albums (Billboard)	29
US Indie Store Album Sales (Billboard)	8
