= I'm a Rebel (song) =

Single by Accept and AC/DC

"I'm a Rebel" is a hard rock song written by Scottish musician Alex Young (also known as George Alexander), that has been recorded and released by Accept and U.D.O.

A version of the song recorded by Australian hard rock band AC/DC has never been released. Alex Young was the older brother of AC/DC guitarists Angus Young and Malcolm Young.

== AC/DC version ==
"I'm a Rebel"

Song by AC/DC
- Released: Unreleased (or leaked)
- Recorded: 16 September 1976
- Studio: Maschen (Seevetal)
- Genre: Hard rock
- Length: 2:10
- Songwriter: Alex Young
- Producer: Unknown (presumably Rudy Holzhauer)

"I'm a Rebel" was recorded by AC/DC at Maschen, Germany, in 1976. After an AC/DC show in Machen, promoter Rudy Holzhauer asked the band to record Alex Young's song within Maschen.

AC/DC recorded the song in a few hours with Alex Young on lead vocals, while usual singer Bon Scott (who was reportedly very drunk at the time) did backing vocals. It was recorded without the bands' usual producers, George Young (also a younger brother of Alex Young) and Harry Vanda.

The recording was not included on the band's next album, Dirty Deeds Done Dirt Cheap, nor the box sets Bonfire and Backtracks (which did include many other rarities). It is reportedly held in the vaults of the band's main record label, Albert Productions.

Accept guitarist Wolf Hoffmann has claimed in an interview that the AC/DC recording is "way better" than Accept's version.

=== Leak claims ===
In spite of being one of AC/DC's rarest tracks, some uploaded their own recreation of the original version. Some of these uploads can be found through forums and YouTube. However a very few claim to have "leaked the original," where Bon Scott is heard singing the chorus in the background (and supposedly playing drums); hence with the quality of the "leaked" version sounding somewhat "watery".

=== Personnel ===
- Bon Scott – background vocals, drums (Note: Indicates there's no known confirmation of whether Bon Scott sang in the background and played drums, along with Alex Young singing and/or not playing bass - or if it was Mark Evans.)
- Angus Young – lead guitar
- Malcolm Young – rhythm guitar
- Mark Evans – bass
- Phil Rudd – drums
- Alex Young – lead vocals, bass

== Accept version ==
"I'm a Rebel"

Single by Accept

from the album I'm a Rebel
- B-side: "No Time to Lose"
- Released: 1980
- Recorded: 1979
- Genre: Heavy metal
- Length: 3:57
- Songwriter: Alex Young (cred. George Alexander)
- Producer: Dirk Steffens

Accept singles chronology
"Lady Lou" (1979)	"I'm a Rebel" (1980)	"Burning" (1981)

Accept recorded the song in 1979, releasing it in 1980 as a single as well as the opening track for their second album, I'm a Rebel. It was credited to the pseudonym "George Alexander". It was the band's only recording of a song no band member wrote or co-wrote until a rearrangement of Edward Elgar's instrumental "Pomp and Circumstance" was included on Death Row (1994).

=== Personnel ===
- Udo Dirkschneider – vocals
- Wolf Hoffmann – guitars
- Jörg Fischer – guitars
- Peter Baltes – bass guitar
- Stefan Kaufmann – drums

== U.D.O. version ==
U.D.O., featuring Accept singer Dirkschneider, released a new recording of the song in 1998 on their album No Limits. They went on to include the song on their 2001 live album release Live from Russia.

=== Personnel, studio recording ===
- Udo Dirkschneider – vocals
- Stefan Kaufmann – guitar
- Jürgen Graf – guitar
- Fitty Wienhold – bass guitar
- Stefan Schwarzmann – drums

=== Personnel, live recording ===
- Udo Dirkschneider – vocals
- Stefan Kaufmann – guitar
- Igor Gianola – guitar
- Fitty Wienhold – bass guitar
- Lorenzo Milani – drums
