= Burning (Accept song) =

Single by Accept

from the album Breaker
- B-side: "Down and Out"
- Released: February 1981
- Recorded: December 1980 – January 1981
- Genre: Heavy metal, hard rock
- Length: 8:57
- Label: Brain
- Songwriters: Dirkschneider, Hoffmann, Fischer, Baltes, Kaufmann.

Accept singles chronology
"I'm a Rebel" (1980)	"Burning" (1981)	"Breaker" (1981)

"Burning" is a song by German heavy metal band Accept, from their album Breaker, released in 1981. Written and composed by Wolf Hoffmann, Peter Baltes, Jörg Fischer, Stefan Kaufmann and Udo Dirkschneider, it was also released as a single with "Down and Out" as the B-side. Two other songs on the Breaker album ("Breaker" and "Starlight") were also released as singles in 1981.

The original recording of "Burning" is notable for a fake live performance; it was recorded with crowd noise mixed in instead of being recorded at a concert. "Burning" appears on eight of Accept compilation albums: Restless: The Best (1982), Best of Accept (1983), Midnight Highway (1983), Hungry Years (1985), The Collection (1991), Steel Glove (1995), Sharkbite – Best Of (2005) and The Accept Collection (2010).

== Track listing ==
No.	Title	Length
1.	"Burning"	5:13
2.	"Down and Out"	3:44

== Personnel ==
- Udo Dirkschneider – vocals
- Wolf Hoffmann – guitar
- Jörg Fischer – guitar
- Peter Baltes – bass guitar
- Stefan Kaufmann – drums
