= Restless and Wild (song) =

Single by Accept

from the album Restless and Wild
- B-side: "Don't Go Stealing My Soul Away"
- Released: November 1982
- Genre: Heavy metal
- Length: 4:10
- Label: Metronome Music
- Songwriter(s): Peter Baltes, Udo Dirkschneider, Wolf Hoffmann, Stefan Kaufmann

Accept singles chronology
"Fast as a Shark" (1982)	"Restless and Wild" (1982)	"Balls to the Wall" (1984)

"Restless and Wild" is a song by German heavy metal band Accept from their album Restless and Wild, released in 1982. Written and composed by Wolf Hoffmann, Peter Baltes, Herman Frank, Stefan Kaufmann, Udo Dirkschneider and Robert A. Smith-Diesel, it was also released as a single with "Don't Go Stealing My Soul Away" as the B-side. Another song from the Restless and Wild album, "Fast as a Shark", was also released as a single in 1982. "Restless and Wild" was later coupled with "Fast as a Shark" for a UK 12-inch single in 1983.

"Restless and Wild" appears on eight Accept compilation albums: Restless: The Best (1982), Best of Accept (1983), Hungry Years (1985), A Compilation of the Best of Balls to the Wall/Restless and Wild (1986), The Collection (1991), Steel Glove (1995), Sharkbite – Best Of (2005) and The Accept Collection (2010).

== Track listing ==
=== 1982 7-inch single ===
No.	Title	Writer(s)	Length
1.	"Restless and Wild"	Robert A. Smith-Diesel and Accept	4:12
2.	"Don't Go Stealing My Soul Away"	Robert A. Smith-Diesel and Accept	3:15

=== 1983 12-inch single ===
No.	Title	Writer(s)	Length
1.	"Restless and Wild"	Robert A. Smith-Diesel and Accept	4:12
2.	"Fast as a Shark"	Hoffmann, Kaufmann, Dirkschneider, Baltes	3:49

== Personnel ==
- Udo Dirkschneider – vocals
- Wolf Hoffmann – guitar
- Herman Frank – guitar (credited, but does not appear on the album)
- Peter Baltes – bass guitar
- Stefan Kaufmann – drums
