= Grapefruit (band) =

British band

- Origin: London, England
- Genres: Psychedelic pop, pop rock
- Years active: 1967–1969; 1971
- Labels: RCA Victor, Dunhill Records
- Past members: George Alexander; John Perry; Pete Swettenham; Geoff Swettenham; Mick Fowler; Bob Wale

Grapefruit were a London-based British band of the late 1960s, brought together by Terry Doran of Apple Publishing, a music publishing company started and owned by the Beatles. Their brand of music was a typical late 1960s blend of rock, which they often fused with psychedelic effects such as phasers and vocoders, or classical arrangements.

== Biography ==
In summer 1967, Doran, a longtime friend of Brian Epstein's and the new managing director of Apple Publishing, signed Scottish-born singer and bass guitarist George Alexander, born Alexander Young, the older brother of the Easybeats' guitarist/songwriter George Young (and also of Malcolm and Angus Young, both founding members of the Australian hard rock band AC/DC), to a publishing contract. Alexander Young had chosen to remain in Britain when the rest of the Youngs emigrated to Australia, and had previously played with The Bobby Patrick Six, with whom he toured Germany in the mid-1960s. In November 1967, John Perry, a former member of Tony Rivers and the Castaways, pitched some of his songs to Doran at Apple Publishing. Doran rejected the songs but proposed combining Perry and his bandmates Geoff Swettenham and Pete Swettenham with Alexander to form a new group. The band was named Grapefruit by John Lennon after a book written by his future wife Yoko Ono that was also entitled Grapefruit. Doran became their manager, seeing some commercial potential in them.

Apple promptly licensed Grapefruit's music publishing rights for the U.S. to a new publishing and recording label being formed by Terry Melcher entitled Equinox. However, since Apple did not have its own record label at the time, Doran arranged for the band's records to be licensed to RCA Records in the UK and to Equinox in the U.S. They were the second band signed to Apple Publishing, following the Liverpool group Focal Point, who were signed by Doran in September 1967. In addition, the Beatles continued to take an interest in Grapefruit, with John Lennon introducing the band to the media in January 1968 and inviting John Perry to join in on the recording of the hit single "Hey Jude". In addition to Lennon, Paul McCartney and Ringo Starr of the Beatles, Brian Jones of the Rolling Stones, Donovan, and Cilla Black attended the press launch and were photographed with the band. Jimi Hendrix and Sajid Khan were reportedly also in attendance.

When Melcher came to the UK to sign the publishing deal with Apple, he was persuaded to produce Grapefruit's inaugural single "Dear Delilah", which peaked at number 21 in the UK Singles Chart in the spring of 1968. As a follow-up single, Lennon and McCartney took the band into the studio in January 1968 to record the song "Lullaby" (also known as "Lullaby for a Lazy Day" and originally called "Circus Sgt. Pepper"). However, when RCA asked for the follow-up single, the recording (which had been made at Advision Sound Studios in London) was not turned over, as Lennon and McCartney were in India, and Grapefruit instead submitted the songs "Elevator" and "Yes", which became a two-A-sided single but failed to chart. For a third single, Grapefruit submitted several other new songs, and a cover of The Four Seasons' "C'mon Marianne" was remixed (at RCA's request) by Derek Lawrence and reached number 35.

Before the next single could be released, RCA dropped the band in the UK, and the new head of Apple Publishing, Mike O'Connor, released the group from its Apple contracts, (except for the original publishing contract with George Alexander), and Terry Doran (still managing Grapefruit) signed the band directly to Equinox. Terry Melcher then resumed producing Grapefruit, including re-mixing or re-recording earlier songs (for which Apple was willing to supply the tapes), but the Lennon-McCartney version of "Lullaby" was still not released.

In December 1968, the group went through a small line-up change. John Perry moved to bass, while George Alexander switched to guitar. They also added Mick Fowler on keyboards and released a fourth single, "Someday Soon", which also failed to chart. Grapefruit then released two albums (Around Grapefruit (1968) and Deep Water (1969)) with limited success, while their single "Deep Water" did crack the German Top 20, peaking at No. 19. Grapefruit broke up in late 1969, although Pete Swettenham had left the group earlier in the year and been replaced by Bob Wale on the second album. Toward the end of their career, following the new material being written by Alexander (with some inclusions by Wale), Grapefruit shifted from melodic pop to more of a rock-based sound, referred to as soft rock in a full-page Billboard advertisement for their second album, Deep Water.

After the break-up, Alexander remained the most visible. Alexander joined forces with his brother George Young and his songwriting partner Harry Vanda from the Easybeats and, in 1970, they recorded for the Young Blood label as Paintbox and Tramp. Alexander also participated in sessions for Vanda and Young's Marcus Hook Roll Band. In 1971, they revived the Grapefruit name, issuing, "Universal Party" / "Sha Sha", but the single was a one-off release with no follow-up.

In 2016, a 20-song compilation of all of Grapefruit's recordings for Apple prior to November 1968, entitled Yesterday's Sunshine, was released by RPM Records. This compilation (with 18 songs written by Alexander, one by Perry, plus the cover "C'Mon Marianne") was the first to include the original version of "Lullaby" that was produced by Lennon and McCartney, as the version released on Around Grapefruit was a later, group-produced version that had been remixed by Melcher, who also added an orchestral arrangement.

== Activities outside of Grapefruit ==
Peter Swettenham became a producer and engineer. His production includes singles for Driftwood, The Playground, Jimmy Cassidy, Liverpool Express, John Le Mesurier, The Cats and others. He also was the assistant engineer on the Band on the Run album by Paul McCartney and Wings.

== Members ==
- George Alexander (born Alexander Young, 28 December 1938, Cranhill, East End, Glasgow – 4 August 1997) – bass guitar, vocals, guitar, saxophone
- John Perry (born Charles John Perry, 16 July 1949, Dagenham, London) – vocals, lead guitar, bass guitar
- Pete Swettenham (born Peter Francis Swettenham, 24 April 1949, Streatham, London) – rhythm guitar, vocals
- Geoff Swettenham (born 8 March 1948, Streatham, London – 28 September 2020, Lambeth, London) – drums
- Mick Fowler (born Michael Eric Fowler, 25 July 1948, Birmingham – 30 January 2022, California, U.S.) – piano, organ and guitar
- Bob Wale (born 2 October 1948, Birmingham) – vocals, lead guitar and harmonica

== Discography ==
=== Albums ===
- Around Grapefruit (1968)
- Deep Water (1969)
- Yesterday's Sunshine (2016)

=== Singles ===
- "Dear Delilah" / "Dead Boot" (1968) (No. 18 Canada, April 6, 1968)
- "Elevator" / "Yes" (1968)
- "C'mon Marianne" / "Ain't It Good" (1968)
- "Someday Soon" / "Theme for Twiggy" (1968)
- "Round Going Round" / "This Little Man" (1969)
- "Deep Water" / "Come Down to the Station" (1969)
- "Thunder & Lightning" / "Blues in Your Head" (1969)
- "Lady Godiva (Come Home)" / "Can't Find Me" (1970)
- "Universal Party" / "Sha Sha" (1971)
