= Martin Motnik =

German-American bassist (born 1972)

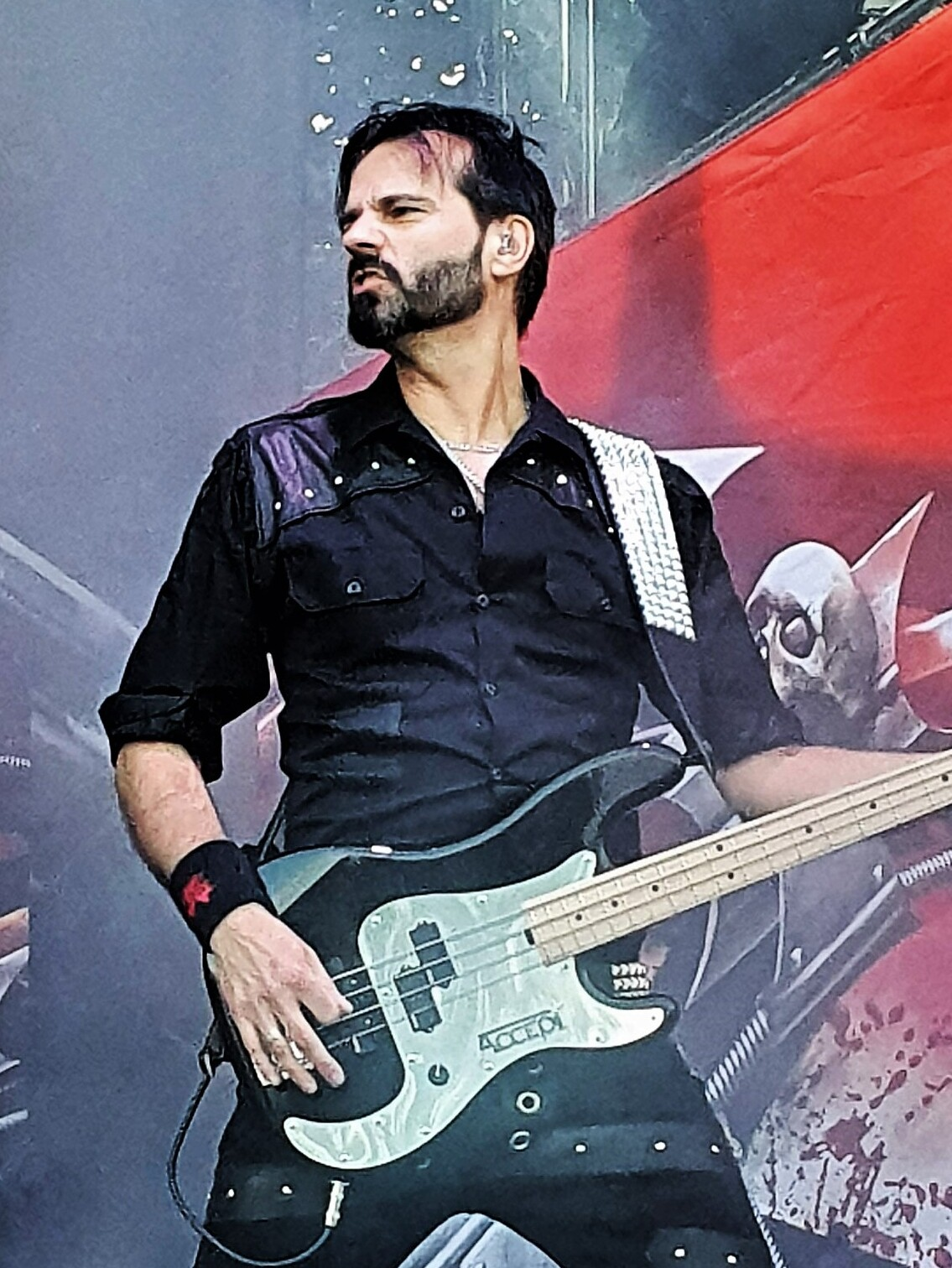
- Motnik in 2022

Background information
- Born: 10 November 1972 (age 53)
- Origin: Ludwigshafen, West Germany
- Genres: Heavy metal, hard rock, jazz
- Occupation: Bassist
- Member of: Accept
- Formerly of: Darkseed, Eisbrecher
- Website: martinmotnik.com

Martin Motnik (born 10 November 1972) is a German-American bassist, best known as the bassist for the heavy metal band Accept. He has also played in Darkseed and Eisbrecher.

Motnik has made two solo albums that include instrumental songs varying in styles from melodic rock, jazz, and classical music.

== Early life ==
Motnik was born in Ludwigshafen, Germany on 10 November 1972. At the age of six, he started playing the flute but was not particularly interested in it. His parents agreed to buy him an acoustic guitar a couple of years later. At the age of ten, he switched to playing the electric guitar, and at the age of 13, encouraged by his older brother Frank, the bass guitar. After getting a bass guitar, he got inspired to play, and started practicing daily by studying bass players such as John Entwistle (The Who), Billy Sheehan (David Lee Roth band), Geddy Lee (Rush). Motnik has named them his biggest influences and role models.

At the age of 16, Motnik started playing in bands, and in the following years, he played in several bands in the Mannheim-Heidelberg area. At this point, he was not yet ready to commit fully to a musical career. First, he worked in a bank, and afterward, he completed an MBA at university. After graduating in 2003, he decided to pursue music full-time. Motnik moved to Munich for better opportunities to focus professionally on a musical career.

== Career ==
=== Early years ===
After moving to Munich, Motnik joined the German goth metal band Darkseed in 2003. He plays on the band's 2005 album Ultimate Darkness. Darkseed announced in August 2006 that singer Stefan Hertrich and bassist Motnik would leave the band and focus on their other projects. In the same year, both participated in the Atargatis band's album "Wasteland" recording.

In 2005 Motnik joined the hard rock band The Roxx. He plays on the band's Unleash Your Demon, released in 2007, and on the live recording The Roxx Unleash The Demon. At the same time, he was also a member of the German Neue Deutsche Härte band Eisbrecher and played bass on the band's tours.

=== Session and concert musician ===
==== Concert musician ====
In 2008 Motnik moved to Los Angeles, US. Ecotonic was the first band Motnik joined there. The band toured in Southern California and made the album When Sparks Fly with Motnik in 2010. Only shortly after moving to the US, Motnik joined Uli Jon Roth's (Scorpions) North American tour as a bassist. This encouraged him to continue his career in the US. Later, in 2009 and 2012, Motnik played again with Uli Jon Roth on his North American tours.

In 2010 Motnik moved to Las Vegas and played as a professional musician in casinos. He worked for Carnival Cruise Lines from 2014 to 2018, first as a bassist and later on as musical director. As a session musician, the playlist often featured various theme nights from Motown to country music, rhythm and blues, disco, jazz and Latin American music, which expanded Motnik's musical repertoire.

==== Studio musician ====
Motnik started playing as a studio musician already in the 1990s. He plays on Dan Lucas's album News, among others. After moving to Las Vegas, he started a site that makes it easy to work with other musicians worldwide.

Motnik has worked as a studio musician with several artists playing many different styles, such as The Wrecking Crew's Hal Blaine (drums) and Don Rand (piano), Gregg Bissonette, Phil Campbell, Paul Sabu and Bruce Kulick, and Ralf Scheepers. Motnik has said that he enjoys as much working in the studio as in live concerts:

"My best days are when I have spent the day working in the studio, and at night I am playing a gig. That's when both my desires are being fulfilled, my passion to record and my love to play out live and interact with other musicians and the audience."

He continues as a studio musician after joining Accept.

=== Accept ===
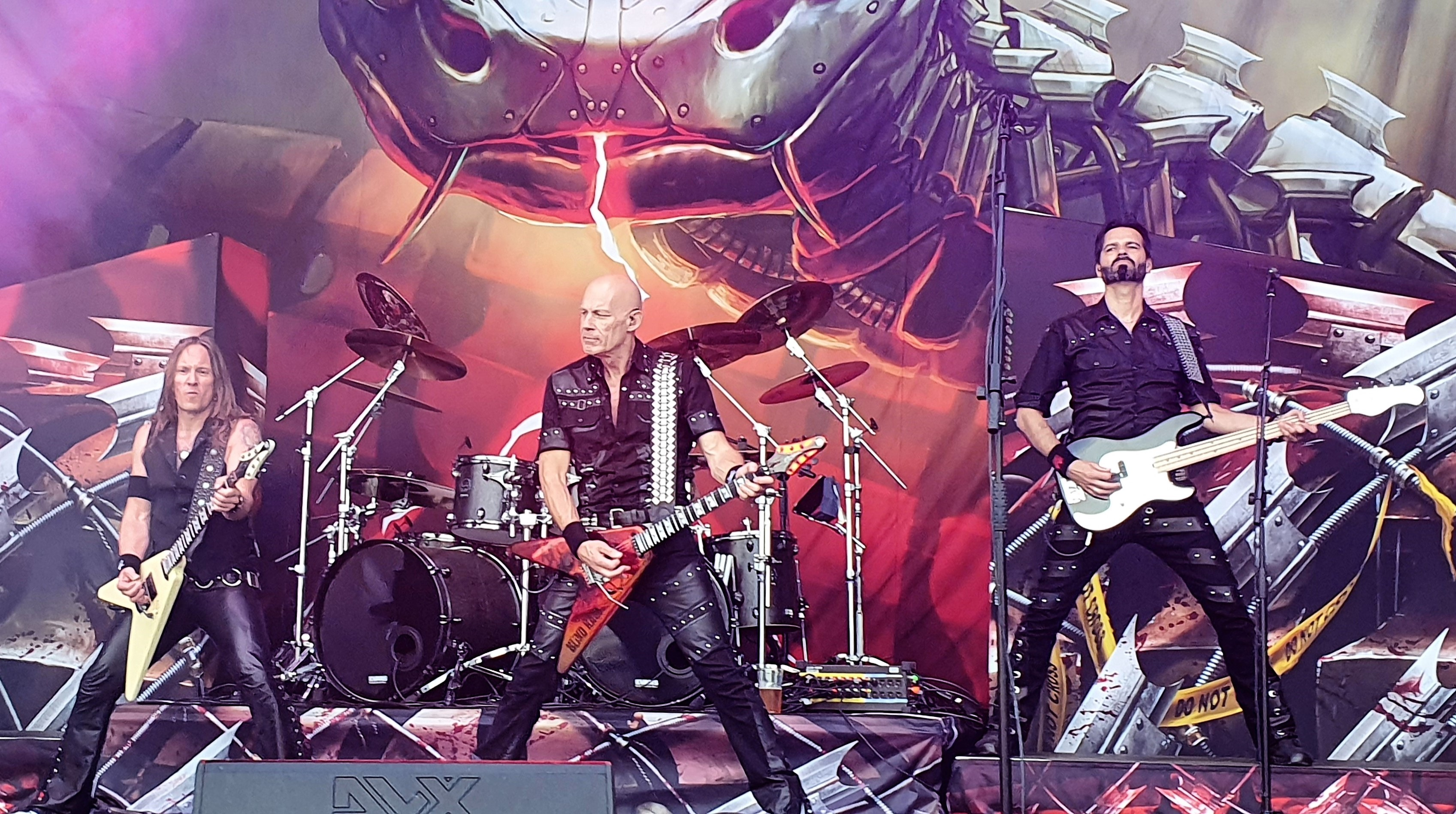
Accept in 2022. Martin Motnik on right.

In February 2019, shortly after Peter Baltes had left Accept, Motnik moved to Nashville. He contacted the band, and after a while, he got an answer from Wolf Hoffmann, who invited him to a jam session. In April 2019, Accept announced that Martin Motnik had replaced Baltes as bassist. He joined the band just before the Symphonic Terror tour, and Motnik had a week and a half to learn the 22 songs.

Too Mean to Die is the first Accept album that Motnik plays. He did compose songs for the album and actively participated as part of the team in making all the songs.

=== Solo works ===
In 2005 Motnik made, in collaboration with drummer Gregg Bissonette, a solo CD Bass Invader. The album is an intense collection of 14 instrumental tracks. Most of the songs are originals, composed by Motnik, but there are also some cover songs. The bass patterns of the songs run the gauntlet of tonal possibilities and vary from soft ballads and acoustic sections to fast bass-played bits that sound like a regular guitar, even though they aren't. The main part of the album is the bass tunes played by Motnik, in addition to them, Swedish Mattias Eklundh plays the guitar in two songs.

In the autumn of 2021, Motnik released his second solo album, Dream Chaser. The album has ten instrumental songs, whose style varies from melodic rock to Latin American music, R&B, fusion, classical music, swing, jazz, and blues. Each song features a guest musician who plays his own solo. Guests on the album include guitarists Joe Satriani, Wolf Hoffmann, Bruce Kulick, Frank Gambale, Andy Timmons, Mattias Eklundh and Jennifer Batten, keyboardist Derek Sherinian and drummers Christopher Williams, Walfredo Reyes Jr., Joe Babiak, and Gregg Bissonette.

== Style and instruments ==
Motnik uses different playing techniques like tapping, slapping, plucking, picking, and impressive use of harmonics. He seems to know where the bass is traditionally supposed to be when combined with guitar and drums. He usually picks and strikes the strings with his fingers without a plectrum. After joining Accept, in concerts, he switched to using a plectrum and hangs the bass lower than before.

Since 2004, Motnik has been using a five-string Jens Ritter Roya bass guitar. After moving to Nashville, he did expand his arsenal with a couple of Fender Precisions. He uses Sadowsky bass guitars in Accept's concerts. In concerts, he often uses Line 6's effect pedals and the M9 pedal with a compressor setting. Another pedal he uses is a Gallien-Krueger Plex pedal.

== Discography ==
=== Solo albums ===
- Bass Invader (2005)
- Dream Chaser (2021)

=== Darkseed ===
- Ultimate Darkness (2005), Massacre Records

=== The Roxx ===
- Unleash your demon (2007), Rockville Music
- The Roxx Unleash The Demon, DVD (2008), Rockville Music

=== Accept ===
- Too Mean to Die (2021), Nuclear Blast
- Humanoid (2024), Napalm Records

=== Studio albums ===
- Dan Lucas – News (1996) Arcade Music Company
- The Winners – Island of sun (1996) Weltbild Verlag
- What4- Fourward (2004) Kintom Music
- Atargatis – Wasteland (2006) Massacre Records
- Q-Ten-Peck – Prestige (2008)
- Beyond the void – Gloom is a trip for two (2008)
- Ralf Jung – Art of Pop (2010)
- Ecotonic - When Sparks Fly (2010)
- Mansour - Live in Concert, CD & DVD (2010)
- Born 2 Rule - World at War (2014)
- Velvet Steel - Thunderous Rain (2013)
- All the Wise - All the Wise (2013)
- Jeff Sontag – Jeff Sontag (2014)
