= Dirk Steffens =

German musician, audio engineer, and record producer

- Born: May 20, 1950 (age 76)
- Occupations: Musician; Audio engineer; Record producer

Dirk Steffens (born May 20, 1950) is a German musician, audio engineer, and record producer.

== Early musical career ==
Steffens studied guitar and piano at the Hamburg Conservatory. As well, he played in the group Beathovens between 1969 and 1971. In 1971, he began his own group Pennywonder, which also consisted of Thomas Kuckuck, Jurgen Ehlert, and Enrico Lombardi. In July, 1973, he joined the group Birth Control, and for family concerns, he left the group in Jan. of 1974. He then worked as a guitar instructor and studio musician. In the fall of 1975, Dirk Steffens began work on his first solo album, "The Seventh Step", in which he played guitar, and with help from musician Ian Cussick from Scotland, who was a member of Lucifer's Friend for a short time, and musician Rolf Köhler, who was from Hamburg, and part of the group To Be. "The Seventh Step" was finished and released in 1976 by Nova, and a second solo album entitled "Tollhouse" was completed and released by Nova in 1978, also with Dirk Steffens on guitar, and featuring Cussick and Kohler, as well as guest guitarist Peter Wiehe. A lot of both solo record's song titles were referring to personal things from Steffens' own life.

== Solo album reissues and discography ==
In 1995, "The Seventh Step" was issued on compact disc on Second Battle, and "Tollhouse" was issued on CD in 1998.

Discography

Penny Wonder-"Come On-Angel"(single)-1971

Birth Control-Rebirth-LP-1973

Solo- The Seventh Step-LP-1976 and

Tollhouse-LP-1978

Compilations

Birth Control-The Best of Birth Control Vol. 2-1978

Birth Control-Definitive Collection-1996

== Record production credits ==
From the late 1970s and onwards, Dirk Steffens was an active and record producer in the Germany area, and this is a list of artists and recordings he produced.

- Jutta Weinhold-(Here Is The) Nightlife (single)-1979
- Accept-I'm a Rebel-1980
- Accept-Breaker-1981
- Cats TV-Killer Automat (single)-1981
- Tabu-Tanz Intim-1982
- Cats TV-Es Tut Mir Leid/Koxhafen-(maxi-single)-1982
- Allein Various-Das Neue Deutsche Tanzcafe 11-1982
- Inner System-ABC (electric)-1983
- Insisters-I'm The Witch-1983
- Accept-Metal Masters-1984
- Dance Connection-Break It Up/Marimba Walk
- Florin-She Is An Angel-1984
- Break It Up (various)-1984

First Affair-Stay (Don't Hide Away)-1985

Accept-Hungry Years-1987

Mad Max-Night Of Passion-1987

Running Wild-Under Jolly Roger-1987

China-China-1988

Pink Cream 69-Pink Cream 69]1989

Pink Cream 69-49-8"-1991

Velvet Viper-Velvet Viper-1991

Rubbermaids-Twisted Chords-1991

Pink Cream 69-One Size Fits All-1991

Pink Cream 69-Games People Play-1993

Gagu-Lauter-1996

Sinner-Danger Zone-1984 and Touch Of Sin-1985

Compilations

Zed Yago-The Best Of Zed Yago-2002

Various Elaste Volume 3-Super Motown Disco-2010

Jutta Weinhold-In The Deepest Night(12")

== Technical credits ==
The following is a list of artists and recordings in which Mr. Steffens was involved as an audio engineer or technician:

- Helloween (mixing)-Walls Of Jericho
- Inner System-ABC-1983
- Dance Connection-1984
- Break It Up (various)-1984
- V2-V2-1988
- Helloween -Pumpkin Tracks-1989
- Pink Cream 69-Pink Cream 69-1989
- Helloween-Kids Of The Century-1991
- Helloween-Pink Bubbles Go Ape-1991
- Pink Cream 69-49-1991
- Velvet Viper-Velvet Viper-1991
- Rubbermaids-Twisted Chords-1991
- Pink Cream 69-One Size Fits All-1991
- Pink Cream 69-Games People Play-1993
- Gagu-Lauter-1996
- Sinner-Danger Zone-1984 and Touch Of Sin-1985
- "Sinner-Danger Zone/Touch Of Sin"-Cd Universe-
