= I'm a Rebel =

Studio album by Accept
- Released: 2 June 1980
- Recorded: October–December 1979
- Studio: Delta-Studio, Wilster, West Germany
- Genre: Heavy metal, hard rock
- Length: 33:35
- Label: Brain Metronome GmbH
- Producer: Dirk Steffens

Accept chronology
| Accept (1979) | I'm a Rebel (1980) | Breaker (1981) |

Singles from I'm a Rebel
- 1. "I'm a Rebel" Released: August 1980

Original US and UK cover

Professional ratings
Review scores
| Source | Rating |
|---|---|
| AllMusic | 2/5 stars |
| Collector's Guide to Heavy Metal | 3/10 |

I'm a Rebel is the second studio album by German heavy metal band Accept, recorded in 1979 and released in 1980 (see 1980 in music). It was the first of three consecutive Accept records to utilize Dirk Steffens as producer. The album finds Accept continuing to search for their musical direction, experimenting with a more commercial sound than on their debut. Bassist Peter Baltes once again sings lead vocals on two tracks, the slower-paced songs "No Time to Lose" and "The King".

The title track is credited to George Alexander, which is a pseudonym for Alex Young, eldest brother of record producer and musician George Young and AC/DC guitarists Angus Young and Malcolm Young. Guitarist Wolf Hoffmann recalled the circumstances that led Alex Young to work with Accept: "He got involved with Accept through the producer. Everybody after the first record said we have to have a radio hit. 'Guys you need a radio hit and we have just the song for you. Why don't you try this here?'" The song became the basis for the band's first music video.

Lead singer Udo Dirkschneider believes that the album "wasn't too inspired. I think because of some unsuccessful experiments, the band wasn't too solid and the identity wasn't discovered yet." He also blamed "too many people involved trying to manipulate the band, just like on the first album." Accept would become determined to resolve these deficiencies on their next album, Breaker.

I'm a Rebel gained international distribution in the United Kingdom and United States on the Logo and Passport labels, respectively. These international versions both depict a sword hilt on the cover, a more identifiably "heavy metal" image than the original German cover, which has a doorway-type shape encasing the band members superimposed on a picture of a crowded city street (possibly a reference to the Spanish film The Telephone Box). The Passport version simply titles the record Accept, as the band's 1979 self-titled debut had not been released in America.

== Track listing ==
All tracks are written by Accept except where noted.

Side one
| No. | Title | Writer(s) | Length |
|---|---|---|---|
| 1. | "I'm a Rebel" | George Alexander | 3:58 |
| 2. | "Save Us" | | 4:36 |
| 3. | "No Time to Lose" | Dirk Steffens | 4:36 |
| 4. | "Thunder and Lightning" | | 4:03 |

Side two
| No. | Title | Writer(s) | Length |
|---|---|---|---|
| 5. | "China Lady" | Dirkschneider, Baltes, Hoffmann, Fischer, Kaufmann, Steffens | 4:03 |
| 6. | "I Wanna Be No Hero" | Dirkschneider, Baltes, Hoffmann, Fischer, Kaufmann, Steffens | 3:57 |
| 7. | "The King" | Dirkschneider, Baltes, Hoffmann, Fischer, Kaufmann, Steffens | 4:11 |
| 8. | "Do It" | | 4:11 |

Russian edition bonus track
| No. | Title | Length |
|---|---|---|
| 1. | "I'm a Rebel" (Live) |

== Personnel ==
Accept

- Udo Dirkschneider – vocals (except "No Time to Lose" and "The King")
- Wolf Hoffmann – guitars
- Jörg Fischer – guitars
- Peter Baltes – bass guitar, vocals on "No Time to Lose" and "The King"
- Stefan Kaufmann – drums

Production

- Dirk Steffens – producer for Delta-Studio Productions, arrangements with Accept
- Christoph Bonno – engineer, mixing
- Manfred Schunke – engineer on "I Wanna Be No Hero"
- René Tinner – mixing on "I'm a Rebel"
- Cover design by Fessel/Hoffmann
- Published by Oktave, Hamburg
