= Terry Doran =

British music manager (1939–2020)

Terence James Doran (14 December 1939 – 18 April 2020) was an English luxury car dealer, pop music manager and music publishing executive, best known for his association with the Beatles. With Beatles manager Brian Epstein, he co-owned Brydor Cars in the 1960s, supplying sportscars to many figures in the Swinging London era, including the Beatles and members of the Rolling Stones and the Moody Blues. In 1967, he became the manager of Apple Publishing, the first appointment in the Beatles' Apple Corps business organisation. He also managed the Apple artists Grapefruit and Mary Hopkin. He was a personal assistant to John Lennon and then George Harrison. Throughout the 1970s, he worked as Harrison's estate manager at Friar Park in Oxfordshire and assisted in restoring the property.

Doran first met the Beatles in Liverpool, through Epstein, and sold the band their first car, as well as the van in which they travelled to gigs around the North of England. He relocated to London in 1963 when they moved south to capitalise on their national breakthrough. He remained among the group's inner circle, along with other friends from Liverpool who went on to work at Apple, and was a trusted confidant to each of the band members. He is often cited as the inspiration behind the line "Meeting a man from the motor trade" in the Beatles' 1967 song "She's Leaving Home", although Paul McCartney later denied the story. Doran died in 2020 of COVID-19, aged 80.

== Early life ==
Doran was born in 1939 and grew up in Liverpool. His parents were Joseph and Elizabeth (née Molloy) Doran. He was the second of four children, and had three sisters. His childhood nickname was "Teddy".

== Career ==
=== Car sales and dealership ===
==== Liverpool ====
After leaving school, Doran started working for a car dealership in Warrington, near Liverpool. He met Brian Epstein, who was then managing the Epstein family's NEMS record stores, in a Liverpool pub in 1959 and the pair became close friends. Beatles historian Mark Lewisohn describes Doran as "a car salesman with a sharp mind and a ready Liverpool wit". He met the Beatles in the early 1960s, shortly after Epstein had become the band's manager.

As a salesman for Hawthorne Motors in Warrington, Doran sold the first car owned by a member of the Beatles – a blue Ford Anglia – to George Harrison, the youngest member of the group. In exchange for the reasonable terms offered by Doran, Harrison agreed to pose with his bandmates John Lennon and Paul McCartney, and the car, in an advertisement for Hawthorne. The ad appeared in the local Mersey Beat music newspaper in July 1962, at a time when the Beatles' popularity had yet to expand beyond the north of England and the club circuit in Hamburg. Doran then supplied the band – who were soon to fire Pete Best as their drummer and probably lose Best's van as their means of transportation to gigs – with an eight-seater Ford Thames van, which NEMS purchased on the group's behalf.

==== London ====
In 1963, Doran moved to London when Epstein relocated NEMS there, following the Beatles' national breakthrough. He shared a flat in Shepherd Market in Mayfair with BBC Radio producer Bernie Andrews. According to Harrison's first wife, Pattie Boyd, Doran's move from Liverpool came about through a heated telephone conversation with Bradshaw Webb, an upmarket car dealership in Chelsea, during which Doran declared, "If you treat your customers anything like you treat me you're fucked – you'll never sell another car." The company's chairman responded by sending him a first-class train ticket to London and offering him a job. As a Bradshaw Webb salesman, Doran sold a Maserati to Epstein, who became interested in the potential of a car sales business.

Doran co-owned (with Epstein) and ran the car dealership Brydor, based in Hounslow, west of London. The company name was an amalgamation of Epstein's first name and Doran's surname. His customers included the Beatles, who acquired their Minis through Brydor. He also supplied the group with luxury cars as the band members showed an increasing interest in expensive automobiles. These cars included a Ferrari, a Lamborghini, a Mercedes-Benz stretch limousine and a Rolls-Royce Phantom V, all for Lennon; a Jaguar E-type for Harrison when he turned 21 in February 1964, followed by a white Aston Martin DB5; an Aston Martin DB6 for McCartney; and a Mercedes and a Facel Vega for Ringo Starr.

Epstein added to his own car collection with a customised Bentley S3 saloon. Doran fulfilled this order by having the car delivered to Heathrow Airport as Epstein and the Beatles returned to England after the group's highly successful first American tour. Lennon started buying cars from Brydor even though he did not possess a driving licence at first, while Starr only passed his driving test in October 1964. Starr then spent a day selecting a car before settling on the Facel Vega, which he test-drove by taking it up the M1 motorway at 140 miles an hour.

Brydor's business thrived as English rock stars were drawn to Epstein's connection to the company. Among Doran's other sportscar customers were Mick Jagger of the Rolling Stones, Lionel Bart, and members of the Moody Blues and the Yardbirds. When Andrew Loog Oldham, the Rolling Stones' manager, was undecided about the colour of a particular model he wanted, Doran had eight cars in different colours circle Berkeley Square so that Oldham could make his choice from his office window overlooking the square. According to Boyd, Epstein was delighted when Doran made cash deals but would then gamble the money away, resulting in the enterprise's failure.

=== Music publishing and management ===
Following Epstein's death in August 1967, the Beatles decided to manage themselves and hired their friends to serve in key roles in the numerous companies that came to form their Apple Corps business empire. Doran was appointed manager of Apple Publishing. He was the first appointee and worked out of the original Apple Music headquarters, above the Apple Boutique at 94 Baker Street, before the organisation's expansion necessitated a move to larger premises. (Note: Epstein had planned the publishing company with Doran in the manager's role. Apple Music changed its name to Apple Corps in January 1968.) He said when launching the company: "Because the Beatles have made a lot of money, people expect that they'll retire and just go off and enjoy themselves. But they are interested in creating, and they want to help people – young people with talent and ambition who find that no one wants to listen to them."

His first signing at Apple was the band Focal Point for whom he secured a record deal on Decca. After signing songwriter George Alexander to Apple, he introduced Alexander to his subsequent bandmates in the group Grapefruit. Doran managed Grapefruit, and his friendship with the Beatles ensured that Lennon and McCartney assisted the band in recording their first single. In December that year, he secured a deal with American producer and songwriter Terry Melcher's music company for Apple to oversee Melcher's publishing concerns in the UK. According to Peter Brown, Epstein's friend and personal assistant, Doran's inexperience was revealed when he inadvertently signed over Harrison's US publishing interests to Melcher, resulting in Apple Records head Ron Kass having to negotiate for their return.

Through Doran's introduction, Liverpool singer Jackie Lomax became one of the first acts signed to Apple Records. In November 1968, when Grapefruit parted ways with Apple Publishing, Doran commented in The People: "I like the Beatles as friends, but not bosses ... there's too much driftwood at Apple." He enjoyed success as the manager of Apple Records artist Mary Hopkin, although Hopkin later said she was highly dissatisfied with his management. Doran's role as manager of Apple Publishing ended in 1969 after Lennon, Harrison and Starr appointed Allen Klein to manage Apple Corps.

In early 1970, Doran became estate manager at Harrison's new property, Friar Park, in Oxfordshire. He assisted Harrison in renovating the Victorian-era house and gardens, much of which was dilapidated. The project took over four years to complete. He worked at Harrison's company Oops Publishing until resigning in February 1975.

After leaving Friar Park in the early 1980s, Doran ran a business in California renting out rehearsal space. He later returned to car sales, working at a dealership on London's Saab Piccadilly from 1984 to late 1990s .

== Social and creative interaction with the Beatles ==
Following the Beatles' retirement as live performers in 1966, Doran was among a select coterie of friends, all from Liverpool or Hamburg, that shared in a bond between the band members that their wives and girlfriends were unable to break. He was a friend to each of bandmates and a trusted confidant. In a 1981 television interview, he dismissed the suggestion that he was the Fifth Beatle, saying that there were only ever four Beatles. He was initially closest to Lennon and was a regular companion in the latter's drug-taking and exploration of the Swinging London scene. Within the Beatles' inner circle, it was said that Doran's job as personal assistant to Lennon was dependent on his ability to keep Lennon laughing. He was depicted in Hunter Davies' 1968 authorised biography The Beatles as equally adored by Lennon's wife Cynthia and their young son Julian. (Note: Along with Harrison and Boyd, he was part of the support group for what Lennon titled "Operation Cynthia" – namely, to ensure that Cynthia had a pleasant, controlled LSD experience and would appreciate the heightened perception and sense of enlightenment afforded by the drug. Cynthia was nevertheless terrified by the experience.)

During the sessions for the group's 1967 album Sgt. Pepper's Lonely Hearts Club Band, Doran joined Beatles aides Mal Evans and Neil Aspinall in contributing percussion to the song "Strawberry Fields Forever". He also supplied Lennon with the verb that had eluded him in the line "Now they know how many holes it takes to fill the Albert Hall", from "A Day in the Life". (Note: At the time, Lennon said of this contribution: "It was Terry who said 'fill' the Albert Hall ... Perhaps I was looking for that word all the time, but couldn't put my tongue on it. Other people don't necessarily give you a word or a line, they just throw in the word you're looking for anyway.") He is often cited as the "man from the motor trade" mentioned in another Sgt. Pepper track, "She's Leaving Home", although McCartney later denied the story.

When Derek Taylor, the Beatles' former press officer, returned from California shortly before the album's release, he and his wife Joan were surprised to be met at the airport by Lennon, Harrison and Doran all transformed in their hippie clothes and preaching an ethos of universal love. (Note: During this time, Doran's car was a Rover with a psychedelic paint design by The Fool, a Dutch design collective much favoured by the Beatles in 1967.) In July 1967, the Beatles travelled to Greece with the intention of buying an island in the Aegean Sea and setting up a hippie-style commune. The community would have included Doran, Aspinall, Evans and Taylor, but the idea came to nothing.

After Lennon left Cynthia for Japanese avant-garde artist Yoko Ono in 1968, Doran transferred his loyalties to Harrison. He began working for Harrison and Boyd at their house in Surrey. His affability endeared him to artists outside the Beatles' circle. One friend described him as "a rock and roll Frankie Howerd", and he gained a reputation in the music scene for rolling the best joints in London. His friendship with Peter Frampton led to the latter playing guitar on Harrison's sessions with Apple artist Doris Troy, as well as his first post-Beatles solo album, the 1970 triple LP All Things Must Pass. Through Doran, Harrison became friends with comedian "Legs" Larry Smith, the subject of his 1975 song "His Name Is Legs".

Doran shared Harrison's fascination with Indian religion. He was represented in a Krishna-inspired painting that Tom Wilkes designed as an insert poster for All Things Must Pass, although the poster was ultimately not used. Boyd said that Doran (whom she called Teddy) was a welcome ally as Harrison insisted on letting families from the Hare Krishna movement live on the estate. She felt isolated, however, when Harrison consulted only Doran about plans for the grounds, and similarly that he shared his apprehension about embarking on a solo career with Doran and former Apple assistant Chris O'Dell, but not her. Doran took the photos of Harrison used in the artwork of his 1974 album Dark Horse. One shows Harrison reclining on a bench in the grounds of Friar Park; the other, used for the LP's inner gatefold spread, shows him and actor Peter Sellers walking along a path beside a pond. (Note: On the record's inner sleeve, Harrison gave thanks to "Ted Doran".)

After leaving Harrison's estate in the 1980s, Doran remained intensely loyal to the Beatles. In the same 1981 TV interview, he described the band as "the finest human beings I've known". Unlike other members of their inner circle, he refused all offers to write a memoir of his years with the group, and turned down requests to take part in documentaries about them.

== Illness and death ==
Doran suffered from poor health and was afflicted with Parkinson's disease. He spent his final years living in a nursing home in north London.

His death, at age 80, was announced by Mark Lewisohn on 19 April 2020. Lewisohn did not provide a precise date nor details on the cause of death, but wrote: "Not only the 'man from the motor trade' in She's Leaving Home, also a Scouse pal of Brian Epstein (manager of their Brydor Cars business), mate to all the Beatles, a laugh, joint-roller and merry tripper, ran Apple Music and was George's PA at Friar Park." According to his obituary in The Daily Telegraph on 26 April, Doran died of COVID-19.

Pattie Boyd wrote: "So saddened to hear of the passing of Terry Doran. Terry was a major part of my life at Friar Park and he was also very close to George." Former Humble Pie drummer Jerry Shirley described him as a "wonderful man" and recalled how, when Shirley was eighteen, Doran presented him with Paramahansa Yogananda's Autobiography of a Yogi to help comfort him when his mother died.

== Sources ==
- Badman, Keith (2001). The Beatles Diary Volume 2: After the Break-Up 1970–2001. London: Omnibus Press. ISBN 978-0-7119-8307-6.
- The Beatles (2000). The Beatles Anthology. San Francisco, CA: Chronicle Books. ISBN 0-8118-2684-8.
- Boyd, Pattie; with Junor, Penny (2007). Wonderful Today: The Autobiography. London: Headline Review. ISBN 978-0-7553-1646-5.
- Brown, Peter; Gaines, Steven (2002) [1983]. The Love You Make: An Insider's Story of the Beatles. New York, NY: New American Library. ISBN 978-0-4512-0735-7.
- Clayson, Alan (2003). George Harrison. London: Sanctuary. ISBN 1-86074-489-3.
- Doggett, Peter (2011). You Never Give Me Your Money: The Beatles After the Breakup. New York, NY: It Books. ISBN 978-0-06-177418-8.
- Everett, Walter (1999). The Beatles as Musicians: Revolver Through the Anthology. New York, NY: Oxford University Press. ISBN 0-19-512941-5.
- Harrison, George (2002) [1980]. I, Me, Mine. San Francisco, CA: Chronicle Books. ISBN 978-0-8118-5900-4.
- Ingham, Chris (2006). The Rough Guide to the Beatles. London: Rough Guides. ISBN 978-1-84353-720-5.
- Lewisohn, Mark (2013). All These Years: Tune In. London: Little, Brown. ISBN 978-0-316-72960-4.
- MacDonald, Ian (1998). Revolution in the Head: The Beatles' Records and the Sixties. London: Pimlico. ISBN 978-0-7126-6697-8.
- Miles, Barry (1997). Paul McCartney: Many Years from Now. New York, NY: Henry Holt. ISBN 0-8050-5249-6.
- Miles, Barry (2001). The Beatles Diary Volume 1: The Beatles Years. London: Omnibus Press. ISBN 0-7119-8308-9.
- Norman, Philip (1996) [1981]. Shout!: The Beatles in Their Generation. New York, NY: Fireside. ISBN 0-684-83067-1.
- Norman, Philip (2008). John Lennon: The Life. New York, NY: Ecco. ISBN 978-0-06-075402-0.
- O'Dell, Chris; with Ketcham, Katherine (2009). Miss O'Dell: My Hard Days and Long Nights with The Beatles, The Stones, Bob Dylan, Eric Clapton, and the Women They Loved. New York, NY: Touchstone. ISBN 978-1-4165-9093-4.
- Spizer, Bruce (2005). The Beatles Solo on Apple Records. New Orleans, LA: 498 Productions. ISBN 0-9662649-5-9.
- Womack, Kenneth (2014). The Beatles Encyclopedia: Everything Fab Four. Santa Barbara, CA: ABC-CLIO. ISBN 978-0-313-39171-2.
