= Accept (Accept album) =

Studio album by Accept
- Released: 16 January 1979
- Recorded: September and December 1978
- Studios: Delta-Studio, Wilster, West Germany
- Length: 35:57
- Label: Brain Metronome GmbH
- Producer: Frank Martin

Accept chronology
Accept (1979)	I'm a Rebel (1980)

Singles from Accept
- 1. "Lady Lou" Released: November 1979 (Ger.)

Professional ratings
Review scores
Source	Rating
AllMusic	1.5/5 stars

Accept is the debut studio album released by German heavy metal band Accept. It was recorded in 1978 and released in early 1979 on the West German label Brain Records.

Guitarist Wolf Hoffmann later remembered the debut as simply a collection of songs the band had worked up over their formative years, with no real focus: "We were just playing songs that we had always played. It was material that had gathered up over the first few months and years of our existence and it was a mixture of all kinds of stuff." He also recalls it selling around 3,000 copies.

Lead vocalist Udo Dirkschneider expressed dissatisfaction with the group's first effort looking back on it: "Naturally, it was very exciting for us the first time we entered a recording studio but also disappointing at the same time."

Accept would gain better production values and a more cohesive direction on future releases, but the debut was an important early step that gained them the ability to play the neighbouring countries of Belgium, the Netherlands and France for the first time.

Swedish metal band Therion covered "Seawinds" on Crowning of Atlantis (1999)

== Track listing ==
All tracks are written by Accept.

Side one
No.	Title	Length
1.	"Lady Lou"	3:01
2.	"Tired of Me"	3:13
3.	"Seawinds"	4:29
4.	"Take Him in My Heart"	3:30
5.	"Sounds of War"	4:33

Side two
No.	Title	Length
6.	"Free Me Now"	2:59
7.	"Glad to Be Alone"	5:11
8.	"That's Rock 'n' Roll"	2:52
9.	"Helldriver"	2:40
10.	"Street Fighter"	3:29
Total length:		35:57

=== Note ===
- A Russian edition released by Fono Ltd. in 2017 contains a spoken commentary track by Udo Dirkschneider talking about the early years of the band.

== Personnel ==
Accept

- Udo Dirkschneider – vocals
- Wolf Hoffmann – lead guitar
- Jörg Fischer – rhythm guitar
- Peter Baltes – bass, vocals

Additional musician

- Frank Friedrich – drums

Production

- Frank Martin – producer for Delta Studio Productions
- René Tinner, Manfred Schunke – engineers, mixing
- Jacques Sehy – photography
- Alster-Atelier, Hamburg – cover design
- The motor-saw was provided by Fichtel & Sachs
- Published by Oktave, Hamburg
