= Breaker (Accept album) =

Studio album by Accept
- Released: 16 March 1981
- Recorded: December 1980–January 1981
- Studios: Delta, Wilster, West Germany
- Genre: Heavy metal
- Labels: Brain (West Germany); Passport (US)
- Producer: Dirk Steffens

Accept chronology
I'm a Rebel (1980)	Breaker (1981)	Restless and Wild (1982)

Singles from Breaker
- 1. "Burning" Released: February 1981 (West Germany); 2. "Breaker" Released: April 1981 (Japan); 3. "Starlight" Released: December 1981 (Spain)

Breaker is the third studio album released by German heavy metal band Accept.

== Background and music ==
It was once again recorded at Delta-Studio in Wilster with Dirk Steffens producing, and was the first Accept album engineered by Michael Wagener. Bassist Peter Baltes sings lead vocal on "Breaking Up Again," and the bridge vocal on "Midnight Highway." After the unsuccessful attempt at commercialism on I'm a Rebel, Accept decided not to allow any more outside people to influence the band. Pulling together in the midst of a very cold winter, the band members concentrated on making the album they themselves wanted to make. Udo Dirkschneider remembers: "Following our experiences with I'm A Rebel we made it our goal not to be influenced musically by anyone outside of the band this time." Udo believes Breaker is among Accept's best records and marks the beginning of the band's golden era which lasted up until 1985 - the album title would later become the name of Udo's own record company, Breaker Records.

Wolf Hoffmann concurs: "Maybe we knew that the old approach from the record before didn't work very well. So we were saying 'fuck it, let's just do what we think is right. Let's not try to be somebody else, let's not try to have a radio hit anymore.'" The lone possible concession to commercial interests was the upbeat rocker "Midnight Highway", which Wolf described as "sort of a semi-commercial attempt" and "a little too happy for my tastes."

Much of the rest of the album is angry and defiant in tone, especially the profanity-laced "Son of a Bitch". Udo describes that song's lyrics as "absolutely anti record company." Wolf explains why this particular song was the only one to not have its lyrics printed inside the album: "On the initial release we thought it would be a good idea to just put 'Censored' on the liner notes for the song to avoid any controversy. Well, it turns out it caused more controversy that way with everyone wanting to know who censored it." An alternate version titled "Born to Be Whipped" was recorded with tamer lyrics. Wolf explains: "We had to change it because the British were so uptight about this kind of stuff that you couldn't possibly release the record over there with a song called Son of a Bitch."

== Critical reception ==
Professional ratings
Review scores
Source	Rating
AllMusic	2.5/5 stars
Collector's Guide to Heavy Metal	8/10
The New Rolling Stone Record Guide	2/5 stars
Sputnikmusic	4.0/5

Eduardio Rivadavia of AllMusic wrote: "Though it remains a must-have for die-hard fans only, this was where the band truly hit their stride, not to mention launched their career."

== Track listing ==
All tracks are written by Accept.

Side one
No.	Title	Length
1.	"Starlight"	3:52
2.	"Breaker"	3:35
3.	"Run If You Can"	4:48
4.	"Can't Stand the Night"	5:23
5.	"Son of a Bitch"	3:53

Side two
No.	Title	Length
6.	"Burning"	5:13
7.	"Feelings"	4:48
8.	"Midnight Highway"	3:58
9.	"Breaking Up Again"	4:37
10.	"Down and Out"	3:44
Total length:		43:51

Russian edition bonus tracks
No.	Title	Length
1.	"Breaker" (Live)
2.	"Midnight Highway" (Live)

== Credits ==
Band members

- Udo Dirkschneider – lead vocals
- Wolf Hoffmann – lead guitar
- Jörg Fischer – lead guitar
- Peter Baltes – bass guitar, backing vocals, lead vocals on "Breaking Up Again"
- Stefan Kaufmann – drums, backing vocals

Production

- Dirk Steffens – producer, arrangements with Accept
- Michael "Overload" Wagener – engineer, mixing
- Stefan Böhle – cover photography
- H.G. Bieringer – photos
- Studio Icks & Accept – cover design
- Accept – sleeve design
