= Alexander Young (musician) =

Scottish rock musician (1938–1997)

- Also known as: George Alexander, Monika James
- Born: 28 December 1938; Glasgow, Scotland
- Died: 4 August 1997 (aged 58) Hamburg, Germany
- Genres: Rock
- Years active: 1960s–1990s
- Spouse: Monika James (m.?–1997)

Alexander "Alex" Young (28 December 1938 – 4 August 1997), also known by his stage name George Alexander, was a Scottish rock musician. He was an elder brother of George Young, the rhythm guitarist and founding member of the Easybeats, as well as Malcolm and Angus Young, founding members of the Australian hard rock band AC/DC, and the uncle of Stevie Young, who is also a member of AC/DC.

== Early life ==
Alexander Young was born on 28 December 1938, in Glasgow, Scotland. Young's father, William Young (1911–1985), lived with his family at 6 Skerryvore Road in the Cranhill district of Glasgow. William worked first as a wheel boy in a rope works and then as a machine and saw operator in an asbestos and cement business. In 1940, he joined the Royal Air Force and served in World War II as a flight engine mechanic. After the war, he worked as a yard man for a builder and then as a postman. He married Margaret (1913–1988; maiden name also Young), who was a housewife.

The 'big freeze' of 1963 was the worst winter on record in Scotland with snow eight feet deep. A TV advertisement at the same time offered assisted travel for families for a different life in Australia. 15 members of the Young family left Scotland by aeroplane in late June 1963, including younger brothers William Jr. (1940–2011), George (6 November 1946 – 22 October 2017), Malcolm (6 January 1953 – 18 November 2017) and Angus (born 31 March 1955). Also aboard were his eldest brother Stephen (1933–1989), Stephen's son Stephen Jr. (born 1956), and his only sister, Margaret Horsburgh (1935–2019). Another brother, John (born 1937) migrated to Australia later in 1963. Young chose to remain in Scotland to pursue musical interests.

== Career ==
When his family emigrated to Sydney, Young was in a band called the Bobby Patrick Big Six and spent some time in Germany. Later, in 1967, Young formed and played bass in the London-based band Grapefruit, initially called "the Grapefruit", with three former members of Tony Rivers and the Castaways, John Perry, Geoff Swettenham, and Pete Swettenham.

Young was signed as songwriter with Apple Music Publishing Ltd. by Terry Doran, managing director of Apple Publishing, friend of the Beatles, and later manager of Grapefruit, during the summer of 1967. The song writing contract was based on the strength of the song "Lullaby for a Lazy Day", which John Lennon liked. A tape with this song was found in his personal belongings.

Grapefruit received some support from the Beatles and released two albums and several singles during 1968 and 1969. The group was launched by the Beatles with a press conference on 17 January 1968, their first single being "Dear Delilah". It went to number 21 in the UK Singles Chart in February 1968. Paul McCartney directed a promo film (never released) for the single "Elevator". McCartney, John Lennon and George Harrison attended and helped in their recording sessions for the singles, as Grapefruit did not have a producer at the time. However, the group broke up in late 1969; only Young and Perry remained in the music business, each as a session musician.

A song written by Alexander Young, "I'm a Rebel", was recorded in September 1976 by his brothers' band AC/DC, but was never released. Young sang lead vocals on the track, with regular AC/DC vocalist Bon Scott on backing vocals. The song was later given to the German group Accept.

In 1971, he released another single, "Sha-Sha"/"Universal Party", under the name Grapefruit with George Young and Harry Vanda.

Alex wrote a song under the name "Monika James" (his wife's name) called "California", which was recorded by his brother George Young's band Flash and the Pan on their debut self-titled album in 1978.

From 1995 until August 1997, Young worked as a music manager with "Proud and Loud Management", based in Hamburg. Young died of lung cancer in Hamburg-Sasel on 4 August 1997.
