= Fast as a Shark =

Single by Accept

from the album Restless and Wild
- B-side: "Get Ready"
- Released: November 1982
- Recorded: 1982
- Genre: Speed metal
- Length: 3:49
- Label: Metronome Music
- Songwriter(s): Peter Baltes, Udo Dirkschneider, Wolf Hoffmann, Stefan Kaufmann

Accept singles chronology
"Starlight" (1981)	"Fast as a Shark" (1982)	"Restless and Wild" (1982)

"Fast as a Shark" is a song by German heavy metal band Accept and a single from their 1982 album Restless and Wild. Its fast double bass drumming is recognized today as reaching a new level in the development of the subgenres of speed, thrash and power metal.

== Song intro ==
The intro to the track is a snippet from a crackly old children's recording of a traditional German tune titled "Ein Heller und ein Batzen" ("A Farthing and a Penny"). The band thought it would make a humorous contrast with their heavy metal sound, and the fact that a young Dieter Dierks (in whose studio the album was recorded) was singing on the recording made it even more of an inside joke. The band soon found themselves in an unintended controversy, however: even though the song dated from 1830, it was a popular marching song during the Nazi era and still held that connotation for many listeners, a fact the band was unaware of at the time. "So out of a funny little idea we created somewhat of a monster", Wolf Hoffmann recalls.

== Legacy ==
"Fast as a Shark" was ranked number 33 in Martin Popoff's book The Top 500 Heavy Metal Songs of All Time.

The song has been covered by Witchery, Helloween, Holy Grail, Rage, Altar, Destruction and Hammercult.

== Track listing ==
No.	Title	Writer(s)	Length
1.	"Fast as a Shark"	Hoffmann, Kaufmann, Dirkschneider, Baltes	3:49
2.	"Get Ready"	R. A. Smith-Diesel and Accept	3:41

== In popular culture ==
- The song is featured in the Italian horror film Dèmoni.
- The song is featured in an episode of the Swedish sitcom Hjälp! (Help!).
- The song is featured in the action video game Brütal Legend.
- The song is featured in the drama film People Like Us.
- The song is featured in the music biopic Lords of Chaos.

== Personnel ==
- Udo Dirkschneider – vocals
- Wolf Hoffmann – guitar
- Herman Frank – guitar (credited, but does not appear on the album)
- Peter Baltes – bass guitar
- Stefan Kaufmann – drums
