= Wilster =

- Town
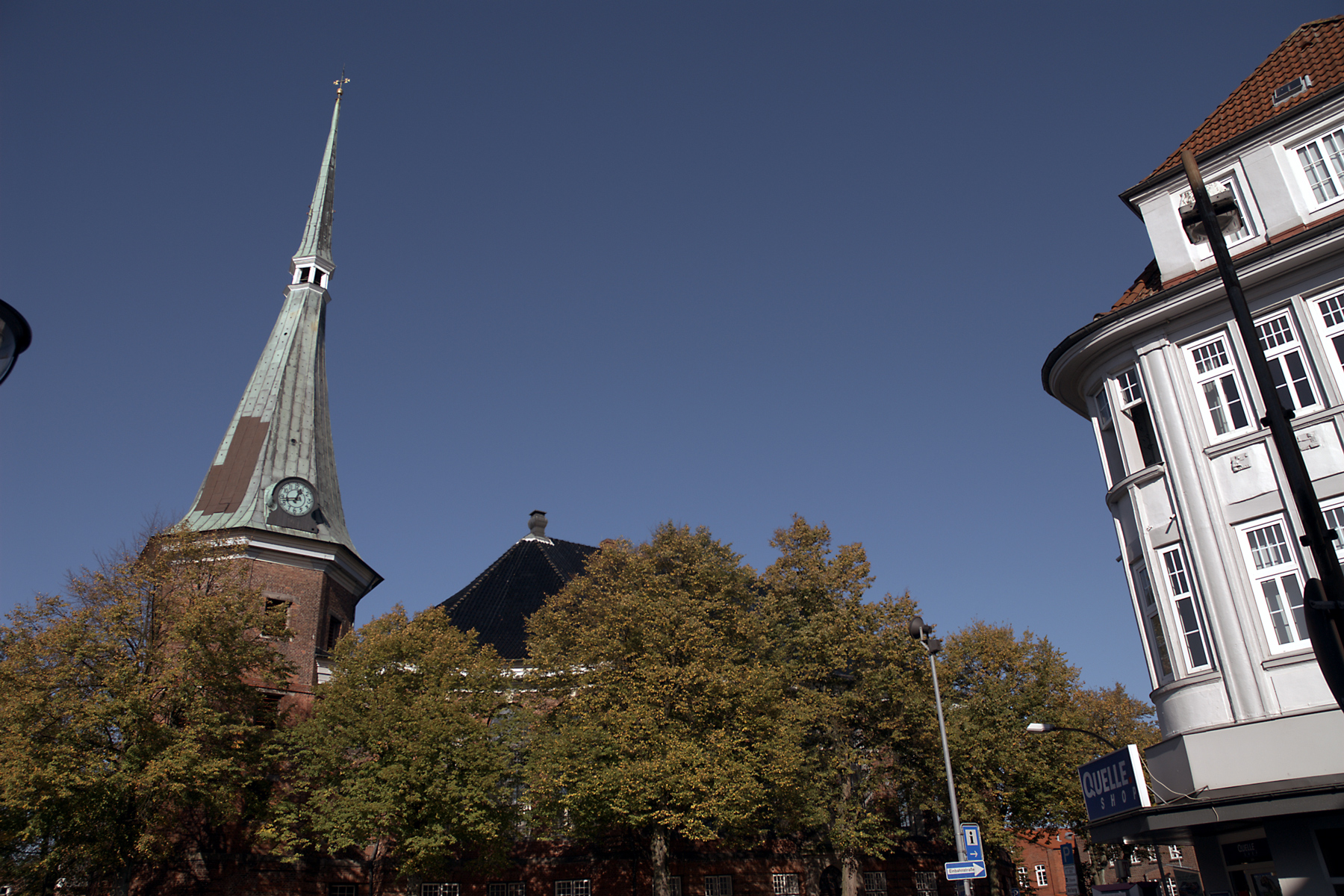

- Coat of arms

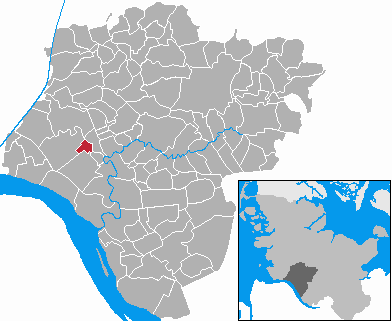
- Location of Wilster within Steinburg district
- Interactive map of Wilster
- Location within Germany Location within Schleswig-Holstein
- Coordinates: 53°55′21″N 9°22′28″E
- Country: Germany
- State: Schleswig-Holstein
- District: Steinburg

Government
  - Mayor: Maren Hayenga (CDU)

Area
  - Total: 2.71 km^{2} (1.05 sq mi)
- Elevation: 2 m (6.6 ft)

Population (2025-12-31)
  - Total: 4,279
  - Density: 1,580/km^{2} (4,090/sq mi)
- Time zone: UTC+01:00 (CET)
  - Summer (DST): UTC+02:00 (CEST)
- Postal codes: 25554
- Dialling codes: 04823
- Vehicle registration: IZ
- Website: www.wilstermarsch.de

Wilster (German pronunciation: [ˈvɪlstɐ]) is a town in Steinburg district in Schleswig-Holstein, Germany.

== History ==
Wilster was granted town rights under Lübeck law in 1282, and thereby counts itself among Schleswig-Holstein's oldest towns. Wilster forms the centre of the Wilstermarsch, a major cattle raising area in Germany.

On 1 July 2005, the town administration and the Amt of Wilstermarsch merged into one authority.

In 2018, the transformers for the NordLink power cable were installed in Wilster.

== Sightseeing ==
The Old Town Hall built in 1585 is among Schleswig-Holstein's finest preserved Renaissance buildings.

Moreover, the late Baroque St. Bartholomew's Church, built by Ernst Georg Sonnin between 1775 and 1781, and the New Town Hall (Doos'sche Palais) built in 1786 are also worth seeing.

== Personalities ==
- 1571, 18 October, Wolfgang Ratke, died 27 April 1635 in Erfurt, didact and pedagogue.
- 1914, 11 February, Hans Hermann Junge, died 13 August 1944 in Normandy, SS-officer and Adolf Hitler's personal valet.
- 1943, 29 April, Klaus Grawe, died 10 July 2005 in Zurich, psychotherapy researcher and psychological psychotherapist.
- 1965, 7 February, Birge Schade, actress

== Gallery ==
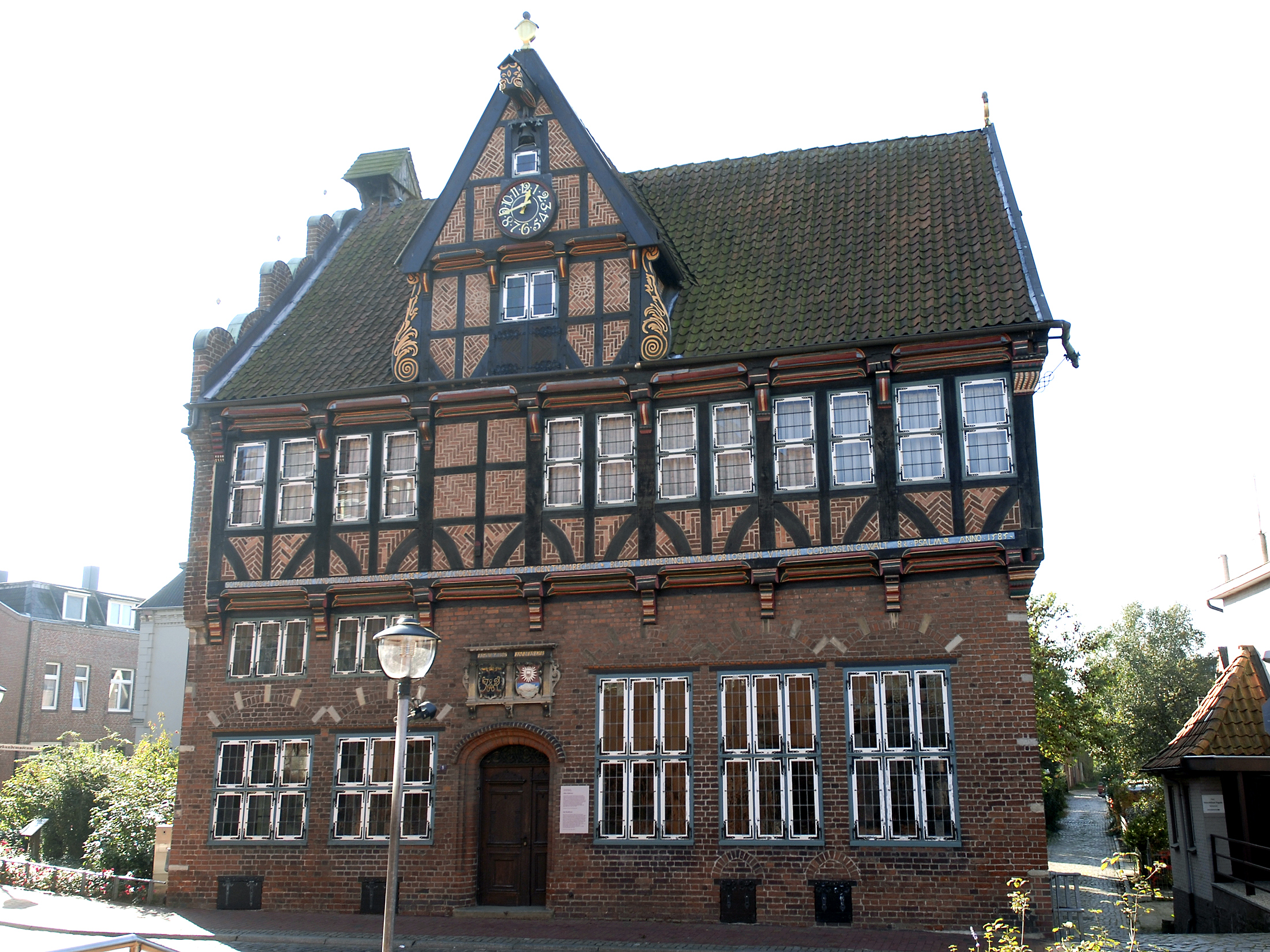
Old Town Hall (Altes Rathaus)

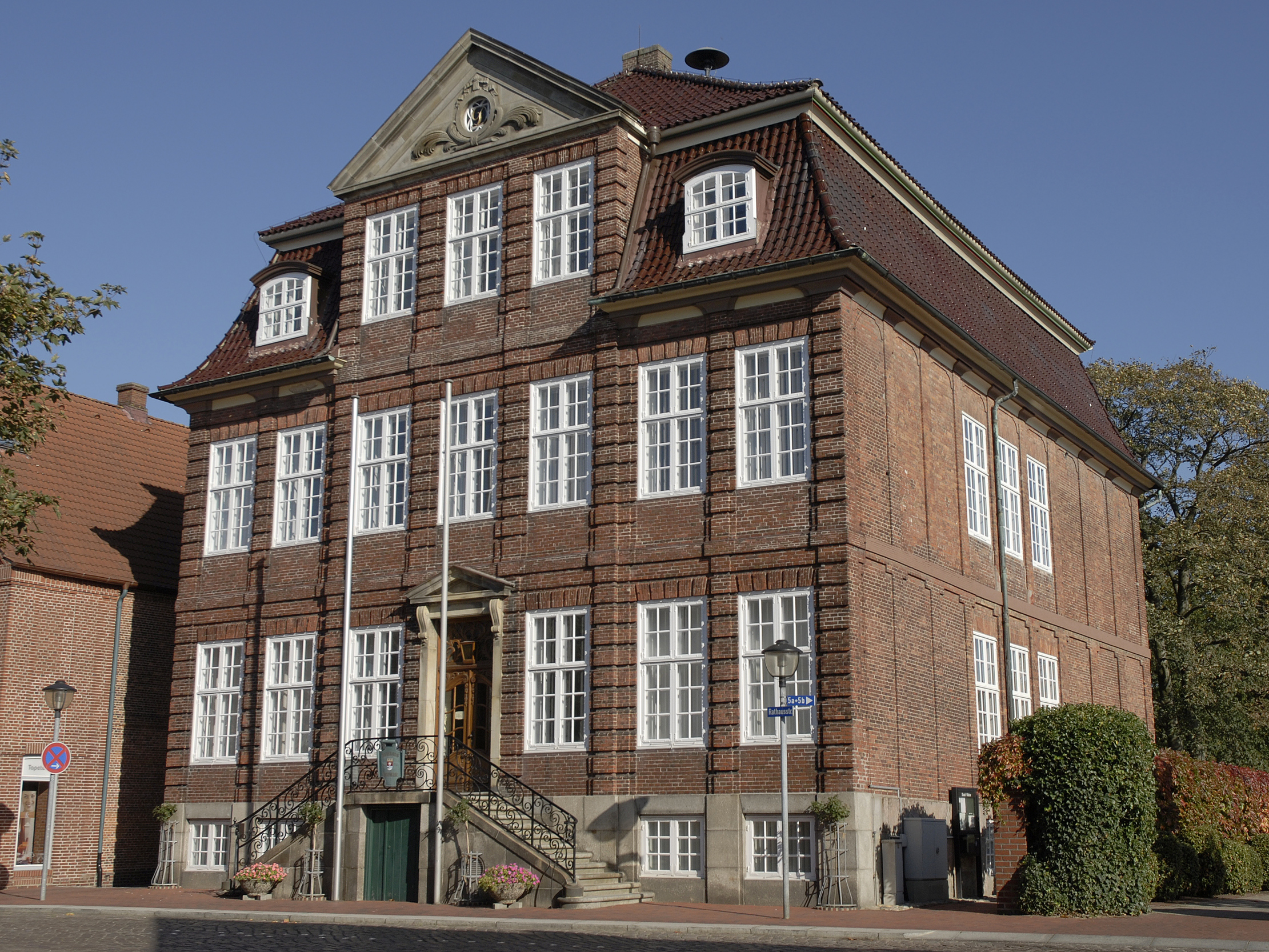
New Town Hall (Neues Rathaus)

Sample Picture of a German City limits traffic sign
