= Restless and Wild =

Studio album by Accept
- Released: October 2, 1982
- Recorded: February–March and June 1982
- Studio: Dierks Studios, Cologne, Germany
- Genre: Heavy metal
- Length: 43:58
- Label: Brain (Germany); Heavy Metal (UK); Portrait (US)
- Producer: Accept

Accept chronology
Breaker (1981)	Restless and Wild (1982)	Balls to the Wall (1983)

Singles from Restless and Wild
- 1. "Fast as a Shark" Released: November 1982 (Spain); 2. "Restless and Wild" Released: November 1982

Alternative cover

Restless and Wild is the fourth studio album by German heavy metal band Accept, released in 1982 in Continental Europe and in 1983 in the US and UK. It was the first Accept album not to be recorded at Delta-Studio, since the band had moved to Dieter Dierks' studio in Stommeln. It is also the first Accept album in which Udo Dirkschneider sings every track, as well as the first in which manager Gaby Hauke ("Deaffy") gains credits for songwriting. Michael Wagener, once again, handled recording and mixing duties here.

== Album information ==
Jan Koemmet joined the band briefly before the release of this album, but did not participate in the recording. The guitar on the finished product is done by Wolf Hoffmann alone, although Herman Frank had joined the band by the time the album was released, and is credited on the album cover.

The album is best known for the opening track, "Fast as a Shark". Stefan Kaufmann's double kick drumming on the song is considered a precursor of thrash metal, preceding the debut releases of both Metallica and Slayer.

Another well-known track is the album closer, "Princess of the Dawn", a tense song that Dirkschneider describes as "a Cinderella story" and "like a Lord of the Rings fantasy" with no deep meaning. Wolf Hoffmann achieved the haunting mandolin-like effect by recording the guitar at half-speed, then having it played back at normal speed. He describes the sudden ending as "an idea that didn't work so well."

Versions of the album released outside Germany were issued with a different cover, replacing the picture of burning guitars with a shot of the band live in concert. American death metal band Cannibal Corpse has made a cover of the song "Demon's Night" on their EP Worm Infested.

On 25 January 2011 the album was performed in its entirety at a special show in Switzerland.

== Reception ==
Professional ratings
Review scores
Source	Rating
AllMusic	4.5/5 stars
Collector's Guide to Heavy Metal	10/10
Hard & heavy	2/3 stars

Restless and Wild has received mostly positive reviews. Eduardo Rivadavia of AllMusic praised Restless and Wild with 4.5 out of 5 stars and called it Accept's "creative breakthrough." He then added, "The bottom line here is that this, like its successor Balls to the Wall, is an essential heavy metal album, and any fan worth his salt should own them both."

Restless and Wild was Accept's first album to chart in the UK, Sweden and the Netherlands. The album failed to chart in the United States.

Udo has agreed with the general assessment of Restless and Wild as a landmark heavy metal record, calling it "surely the most important Accept album". Wolf's praise is more reserved, calling it "just another record" and adding, "looking back maybe we think 'Fast as a Shark' was the first speed metal song ever, but at the time we sorta just had fun and we didn't think it was anything dramatically new. Obviously, maybe what was so cool about this time was that we weren't thinking so much. We were just ballsy and tried to do things without having much to lose."

== Track listing ==
All music is composed by Wolf Hoffmann, Stefan Kaufmann, Udo Dirkschneider, Peter Baltes.

Side one
No.	Title	Lyrics	Length
1.	"Fast as a Shark"	Hoffmann, Kaufmann, Dirkschneider, Baltes	3:49
2.	"Restless and Wild"	Robert A. Smith-Diesel and Accept	4:12
3.	"Ahead of the Pack"	Hoffmann, Kaufmann, Dirkschneider, Baltes	3:24
4.	"Shake Your Heads"	Hoffmann, Kaufmann, Dirkschneider, Baltes	4:17
5.	"Neon Nights"	Deaffy, Smith-Diesel and Accept	6:01

Side two
No.	Title	Lyrics	Length
6.	"Get Ready"	Smith-Diesel and Accept	3:41
7.	"Demon's Night"	Hoffmann, Kaufmann, Dirkschneider, Baltes	4:27
8.	"Flash Rockin' Man"	Hoffmann, Kaufmann, Dirkschneider, Baltes	4:28
9.	"Don't Go Stealing My Soul Away"	Smith-Diesel and Accept	3:15
10.	"Princess of the Dawn"	Deaffy, Smith-Diesel and Accept	6:15
Total length:			43:58

== Credits ==
Band members

- Udo Dirkschneider – vocals
- Wolf Hoffmann – guitars
- Herman Frank – guitars
- Peter Baltes – bass
- Stefan Kaufmann – drums

Production

- Michael Wagener – engineer, mixing
- Stefan Böhle/Studio Icks – photography and design

== Charts ==
Chart (1982–1983)	Peak position
Dutch Albums (Album Top 100)	47
Swedish Albums (Sverigetopplistan)	7
UK Albums (OCC)	98
