= Jörg Fischer =

German metal guitarist

- Born: July 4, 1957 (age 68)
- Genres: Heavy metal, speed metal, hard rock, neoclassical metal
- Occupation: Guitarist
- Years active: 1979–1996
- Formerly of: Accept; The Billionaire Boys Club

Jörg Fischer (born 4 July 1957) is a German guitar player, primarily known for his work with the German band Accept.

== Career ==
Fischer joined Accept at the end of the recording sessions for their self-titled debut and played on the albums I'm a Rebel and Breaker until leaving before recording began for the fourth album Restless and Wild. After the Balls to the Wall recording was completed, he was asked to rejoin the band. Fischer appears on the albums Metal Heart and Russian Roulette. By this time his role had diminished mainly to rhythm guitarist, although he is featured as lead guitarist on the songs "Living for Tonite", "Wrong Is Right', "Aiming High", "Another Second to Be" and "Lay Down the Law" (performed by Accept on UDO's Animal House album). Fischer left the band again around 1988.

Fischer next turned up in a short-lived Los Angeles–based project named Royal Flush which also featured vocalist Dave Fefolt (Masi, Hawk), guitarist Roy Z (Tribe of Gypsies, Bruce Dickinson), bassist Rex Tennyson (Hellion, Heavy Bones), and drummer Reynold Carlson (Jag Panzer, Joey Tafolla); the band broke up after recording a 5-song demo with producer Dieter Dierks.

On the heels of Royal Flush, Fischer teamed up with all Swedish musicians, vocalist Pete Sandberg (ex-Alien, Von Rosen), bassist Magnus Rosén (ex-Von Rosen), drummer Anders Johansson (ex-Yngwie Malmsteen, Silver Mountain), and keyboardist Jens Johansson (ex-Yngwie Malmsteen, Silver Mountain) under the name Goodnight L.A.. Although the band landed a development deal with RCA Records things went no further and the whole line-up decamped to Sweden, invited by Per Stadin from the band Silver Mountain, where they performed as the Coverboys, with Stadin replacing Rosén on bass, a short-lived cover band formed in 1991 for a summer tour of Sweden and Norway. During the Coverboys tour, Fischer and Johansson also recorded the songs that would end up on the album Something Wicked Comes with the band Billionaires Boys Club in 1993.

The Billionaire Boys Club album featured Fischer on guitar, Anders Johansson on drums, Magnus Rosén on bass, and Mark Boals (ex-Yngwie Malmsteen) on vocals. Marcel Jacob (ex-Talisman, Last Autumn's Dream) shared additional bass guitar duties on the album along with Per Stadin. Fischer also did a short tour of Sweden with BBC, now featuring former Yngwie Malmsteen / Madison vocalist Göran Edman instead of Boals.

Since the demise of Billionaires Boys Club Fischer has kept a low profile but resurfaced briefly with Doom Squad, a one-off studio collaboration featuring members of Anthrax, Armored Saint and Ugly Kid Joe, recording a cover of "Burnin' Up" for the album A Tribute to Judas Priest: Legends of Metal, issued in 1996.
