= Accept (band) =

German heavy metal band

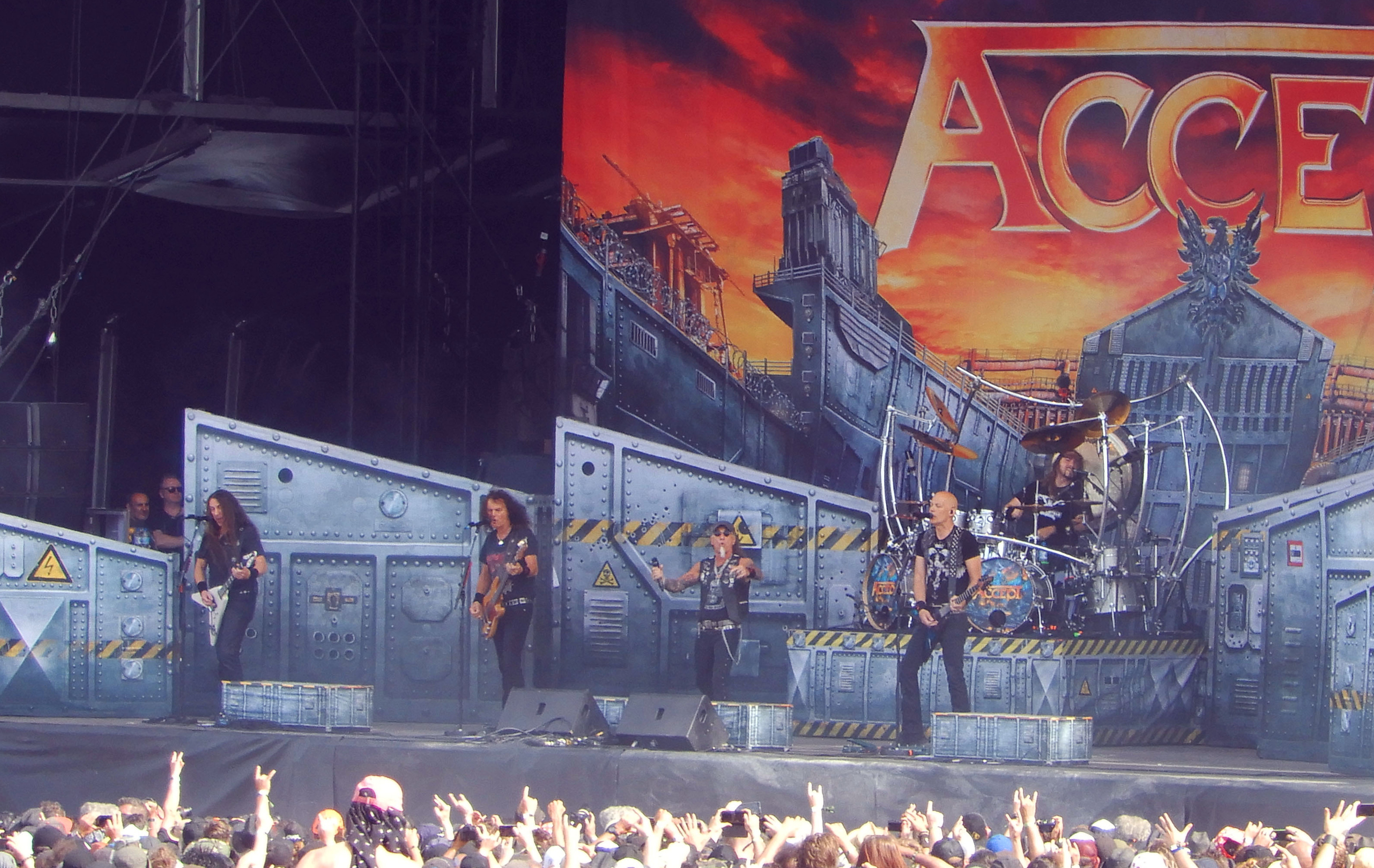
- Accept live at Hellfest 2018

Background information
- Origin: Solingen, West Germany
- Genre: Heavy metal
- Works: Discography
- Years active: 1976–1989; 1992–1997; 2005; 2009–present
- Labels: Nuclear Blast; Portrait/Epic; RCA; PolyGram; Passport; Napalm
- Spinoffs: U.D.O.
- Spinoff of: Band X
- Members: Wolf Hoffmann; Mark Tornillo; Christopher Williams; Martin Motnik; Philip Shouse
- Past members: Peter Baltes; Udo Dirkschneider; Frank Friedrich; Gerhard Wahl; Jörg Fischer; Stefan Kaufmann; Herman Frank; Michael White; Rob Armitage; David Reece; Jim Stacey; Stefan Schwarzmann; Uwe Lulis
- Website: acceptworldwide.com

Accept is a German heavy metal band from Solingen, formed in 1976 with their first consistent lineup featuring lead singer Udo Dirkschneider, lead guitarist Wolf Hoffmann, bassist Peter Baltes, rhythm guitarist Jörg Fischer and drummer Stefan Kaufmann. Their current lineup consists of Hoffmann, vocalist Mark Tornillo, guitarist Philip Shouse, drummer Christopher Williams and bassist Martin Motnik. Accept has undergone numerous lineup changes, with Hoffmann being the only constant member. To date, the band has released seventeen studio albums, five live albums and ten compilation albums.

Accept played an important role in the development of speed and thrash metal, and they were part of the German heavy metal scene, which had emerged by the early to mid-1980s. Accept achieved its first commercial success with their fifth studio album Balls to the Wall (1983), which is the band's only album to be certified gold in the United States and Canada, and spawned their well-known hit "Balls to the Wall".

Accept has disbanded and reformed multiple times. They first broke up in 1989, several months after the release of Eat the Heat (which was their only album with Dirkschneider's initial replacement David Reece), but reformed in 1992 with Dirkschneider and released three more albums before disbanding again in 1997. After briefly reuniting in 2005, Accept announced their third reunion in 2009, with former T.T. Quick frontman Mark Tornillo replacing Dirkschneider (who declined to participate), and the band has recorded six albums with him: Blood of the Nations (2010), Stalingrad (2012), Blind Rage (2014), The Rise of Chaos (2017), Too Mean to Die (2021), and Humanoid (2024). Those albums renewed Accept's popularity in Germany and each reached the top ten of the German album charts. As of 2024, Accept has sold more than 17 million albums worldwide.

== History ==
=== Early years (1968–1982) ===
Accept evolved from an earlier group called Band X, formed in 1968 by lead vocalist Udo Dirkschneider. After Dirkschneider finished his military service in 1972, he reformed the band changed its name to Accept, influenced by the album Accept by the British blues band Chicken Shack. For many years, Accept went through numerous line-up changes. This instability essentially kept the band on an amateur level, making sporadic appearances in festival concerts. Accept's professional career began in 1976, with Dirkschneider, along with Wolf Hoffmann (lead guitar), Peter Baltes (bass), Gerard Wahl (rhythm guitar) and Frank Friedrich (drums), when they were invited to play at one of the first rock and roll festivals in Germany — Rock am Rhein. Following the festival, the band was offered a recording deal. Wahl would soon after leave the group and was replaced by Jörg Fischer. Their first recording was the self-titled Accept album, which was released in 1979, but did not achieve much commercial success. Friedrich quit the band before the release of Accept and was replaced by Stefan Kaufmann, making it the bands first stable lineup. This line-up recorded I'm a Rebel in 1980. "I'm a Rebel" was originally written for AC/DC and recorded by the band but never released by them. The album brought some media attention, and the band was invited to make a televised appearance.

In 1981, Accept's third studio album, Breaker, was released, and the band employed manager Gaby Hauke. The same year, Accept served as a supporting act on Judas Priest's World Wide Blitz Tour, and obtained attention outside of Europe for the first time.

The band's fourth studio album, Restless and Wild was released in 1982. Fischer left before the recording of the album began, as did his intended replacement, Jan Koemmet. Restless and Wild saw an evolution in the band's sound, which incorporated characteristics defining the genre later dubbed speed metal. One of the most notable tracks on the album is the opening track "Fast as a Shark", to which Kaufmann's kick drumming on the song is considered a precursor of thrash metal, predating the debut albums of Metallica and Slayer by a year. Gaby Hauke was credited as "Deaffy" on two of the album's tracks.

=== Mainstream success (1983–1987) ===
Accept's fifth studio album, Balls to the Wall, was released in 1983, now with guitarist Herman Frank (ex-Sinner). Udo Dirkschneider had left the band at this time but returned when the album was being recorded. The album was more conceptual and included lyrical themes about politics, sexuality and human relationships.

During a 1983 show in their hometown, the band met Jörg Fischer by chance and on Hauke's insistence, Fischer rejoined the band. A world tour followed through 1984, including the Monsters of Rock festival. By this time, the band was supported by Bad Steve, a band which was led by former Accept and Band X members Dieter Rubach, Jan Koemmet and Frank Friedrich. The band also opened for Iron Maiden on their World Slavery Tour.

Metal Heart was released in 1985. Produced by Dieter Dierks (then-known for working with Scorpions), it presented the band's creative peak. Accept toured the world supporting the album, and documented the live shows with the live mini-album Kaizoku-Ban.

The follow-up album, Russian Roulette, was released in 1986. In 1987, Udo Dirkschneider was fired from the band, and later decided to embark on a solo career. According to Wolf Hoffmann, Dirkschneider was never fired but it was rather a mutual decision within the band to part ways. Supporting this decision, the songwriting team in Accept wrote his entire solo album, released in 1987 as Animal House under the band moniker U.D.O.

=== David Reece period and first hiatus (1988–1991) ===
Parallel to work on Animal House, Accept started to audition vocalists. The band tried out a few singers, including Ken Tamplin and Baby Tuckoo singer Rob Armitage, whom they even featured in promo photos and metal magazine interviews, and also recorded demos with. Armitage also performed live with the band and one of the shows with him was reviewed by Metal Hammer magazine. However, American vocalist David Reece was chosen and this new lineup recorded and released Eat the Heat in 1989. Fischer left again before the recording of the album. Jim Stacey joined on rhythm guitar for the album's promotional tour. Accept toured in support of the album that year with bands like Metal Church, W.A.S.P., Danzig and Armored Saint.

Accept's career came to a sudden halt when Stefan Kaufmann sustained a serious injury to his back during the tour in support of the album. He was briefly replaced by House of Lords drummer Ken Mary for the remainder of the US tour. By the time the tour ended in late 1989, the band decided that without Kaufmann, and with differences surfacing with Reece, it was time to cease their activities for the time being.

=== Reunion with Dirkschneider (1992–1996) ===
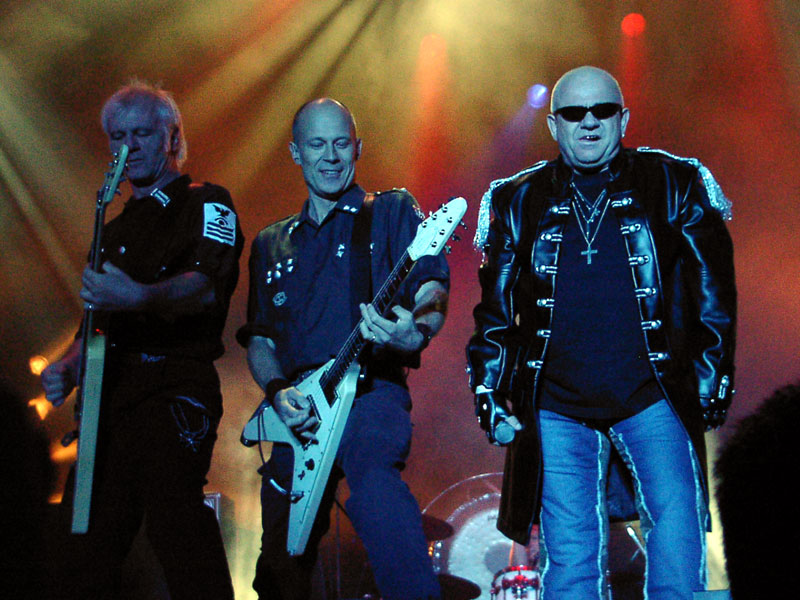
Former lead singer Udo Dirkschneider (right) during Accept's reunion tour in 2005

The live album Staying a Life, recorded in 1985, was released in 1990 as a souvenir celebrating their career.

A few years later the ex-members met with Dirkschneider and decided to relaunch the band with core members Dirkschneider, Hoffmann, Baltes and Kaufmann.

Their comeback album, Objection Overruled, was released in 1993 and was a qualified success in Europe and the United States. Arjen Lucassen of Vengeance was hired as touring guitarist but ended up leaving before the tour started. A world tour followed, and another album, entitled Death Row, was released in the following year. Kaufmann became unable to play once again due to his recurring back injury and Stefan Schwarzmann became the temporary replacement.

Predator (1996) was recorded in Nashville, with Udo's long-time (school) friend and producer Michael Wagener at the helm and with Michael Cartellone (from Damn Yankees) on drums. Accept's tour supporting Predator took place in North America, South America, Europe and Asia, with their last concert in Tokyo, Japan.

=== Second hiatus and brief reunion (1997–2005) ===
Between 1997 and 2005, all the members continued working on their own projects. In 2005, Accept received an invitation from various European promoters for a short summer European Festival tour with Accept's line-up featuring Hoffmann, Baltes, Dirkschneider, Frank and Schwarzmann. These festivals turned out to be a stunning success, with the last show on 27 August 2005 in Kavarna, Bulgaria, at the Kaliakra Rock Fest.

Asked in May 2007 by Lords of Metal if Accept was planning on writing and recording new music in the future, Dirkschneider replied:

That would be a problem. You know, it's easy to play the old songs, because they already exist. Especially for me, it was easier, because I still do those classics with U.D.O., but for some of the guys it was a bit harder. But everybody did a great job on stage. I understand that people want a new Accept album, but composing songs together would have been a disaster. That way we would destroy more than we would create. We have a good relationship now and it's best to keep it that way.

On 14 May 2009, Udo Dirkschneider officially announced that he would not be participating in the rumoured Accept reunion.

=== Return with Mark Tornillo and Blood of the Nations (2009–2011) ===
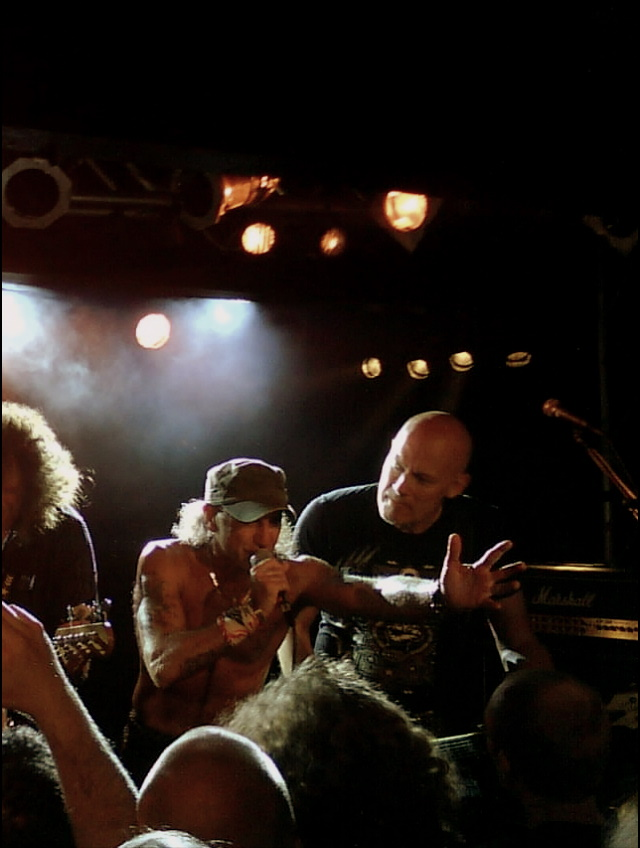
Mark Tornillo (pictured in the middle) with guitarist Wolf Hoffmann in Stockholm, 20 May 2010. Tornillo replaced Udo Dirkschneider as the band's vocalist when Accept reformed in 2009.

At the end of May 2009, rumors again surfaced of a possible Accept reformation, when bassist Peter Baltes revealed he spent a weekend at his house in Pennsylvania "shredding away" with guitarist Wolf Hoffmann. "Something amazing is in the works", Baltes explained. "As soon as I can, I'll let everybody know. Let's make the 'Metal Heart' beat again."

A coincidental meeting between Accept and former T.T. Quick singer Mark Tornillo at this informal jam session occurred shortly after Tornillo was announced as the new vocalist.

A new album was written and recorded with Andy Sneap (of Megadeth, Sabbat, Blaze, Exodus, Testament, Arch Enemy and Onslaught fame) as producer. Titled Blood of the Nations, it was the first original Accept album in fourteen years.

The new line-up made their live debut on 8 May 2010 at the Gramercy Theatre in New York City, their first American concert in fifteen years.

On 21 May 2010, the video for "Teutonic Terror" was number 5 on the worldwide video charts in all genres on MySpace, topping such artists as Miley Cyrus, Justin Bieber and Christina Aguilera. The video also topped the MySpace Global Metal Charts at number 1.

On 13 June 2010, Accept opened for AC/DC in Stuttgart, Germany, and on 25 June 2010, they headlined the Sonisphere Festival in Romania and Turkey. With a set of over two hours, classics like "Balls to the Wall", "Metal Heart" and "Princess of the Dawn" were played along with the new album material. Blood of the Nations was released in Europe on 20 August 2010 and made a chart debut at number 4 in the official German Media Control Charts, the band's second-highest chart debut in their career.

Blood of the Nations was released on 4 September 2010 in Japan, and on 18 September in the United States. Accept spent 80 days on a summer tour traveling over 65,000 km and playing for over 450,000 fans. In October, the band appeared at the prestigious Japanese festival Loud Park outside of Tokyo to 40,000 fans along with Ozzy Osbourne, Motörhead and Stone Sour.

Within a month of the release of Blood of the Nations, Wolf Hoffmann told "Metal Asylum": "We are already thinking about and writing for the next record. We've all missed doing Accept and we realized we missed doing this. Of course, we are not 20 years old anymore and not ready to do just anything to be successful, we're not that desperate. [laughs] We are looking to do what makes sense and that's fun."

=== Stalingrad and Blind Rage (2012–2014) ===
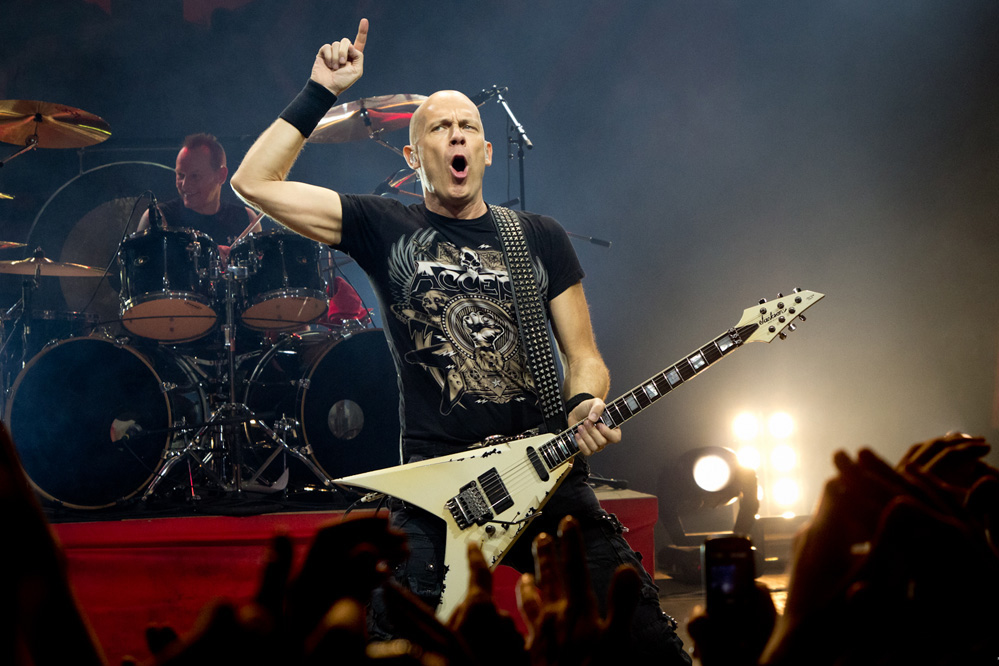
Wolf Hoffmann (pictured in Minsk, Belarus, 2011) has been Accept's guitarist since the band's inception in 1976.

Accept worked with Andy Sneap again to produce their thirteenth studio album, completed in early 2012. Entitled Stalingrad, it was released in April 2012.

On 8 April 2013, Wolf Hoffmann told Chile's Radio Futuro that Accept had begun writing new material for their fourteenth studio album and would "definitely go back to the studio as soon as [they] can." Four months later, on 9 August at the Bloodstock Open Air festival 2013, Wolf told Metal Shock Finland:

Our upcoming album is hopefully going to be out next year. We've started working on writing some songs; we haven't recorded anything yet. But over the winter — maybe early next year — we'll start recording it and try to make it every bit as good as the last one, maybe even better, if we succeed, we'll see... It's going to be as heavy as the rest.

Accept released their fourteenth studio album Blind Rage on 15 August 2014 and on their world tour, they played in Australia for the very first time. Blind Rage became Accept's first album to debut at number one on the charts in their home country.

=== Departures of two members and The Rise of Chaos (2014–2017) ===
On 28 December 2014, guitarist Herman Frank announced that he had left Accept again. Later that day, Accept announced that drummer Stefan Schwarzmann had also left the band.

On 12 April 2015, Accept announced new guitarist and drummer, respectively Uwe Lulis and Christopher Williams.

On 5 June 2015, prior to the band's performance at the South Park festival in Tampere, Finland, bassist Peter Baltes told Kaaos TV that Accept planned to begin work on a new album after the conclusion of the Blind Rage tour. Asked in a July 2015 interview about the band's future, guitarist Wolf Hoffmann replied, "We will continue for a few more weeks, this run of touring, and then we'll take a little break and come back in the fall, but we're pretty much wrapping up the Blind Rage tour at this point; it's the very last phase of this whole cycle. And then the next album will have to be written and to be recorded, and how long that's gonna take and when that's all gonna happen, who knows? But it'll happen; that's all I know." Hoffmann stated that the new album would be released around July or August 2017. Like their previous three albums, the album was produced by Andy Sneap, making it Accept's fourth collaboration with him. On 16 April 2017, Accept announced that the album, titled The Rise of Chaos, would be released on 4 August.

On 2 June 2017, the band released the title track single digitally via Nuclear Blast accompanied by new artwork.

=== Split with Peter Baltes, Too Mean to Die and Humanoid (2018–2025) ===
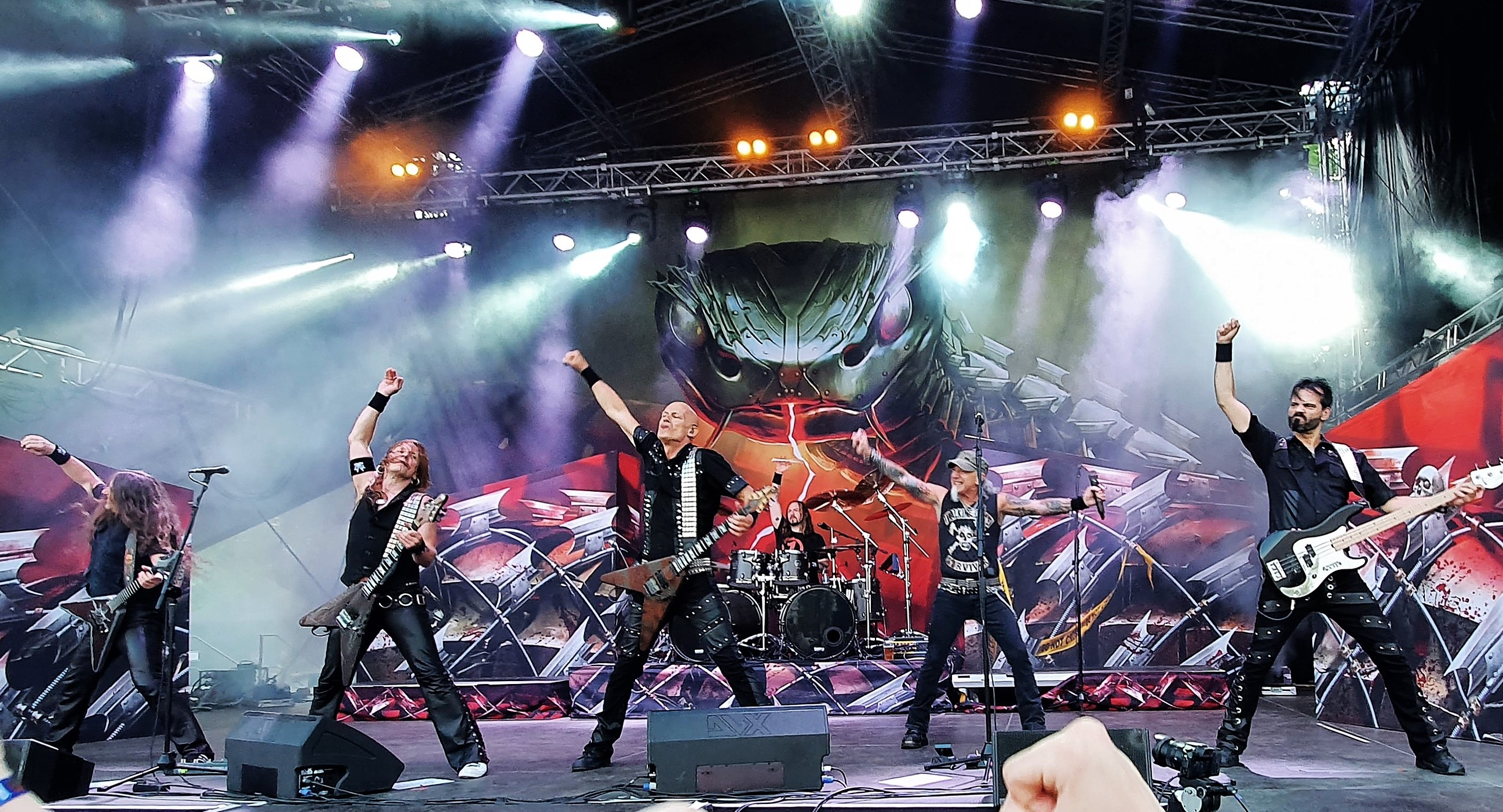
Accept in Finland 2022

In a September 2018 interview with The Foundry, guitarist Wolf Hoffmann confirmed that Accept had begun the songwriting process for the follow-up to The Rise of Chaos. He stated, "We started putting down some riffs here and there, but the majority of the stuff will happen after we stop touring because it's really hard to do this on the road for me."

On 27 November 2018, bassist Peter Baltes announced that he had left Accept after 42 years as a member. According to the band, "Peter needed a change in his life and we wish him all the best. He will always be part of the Accept family and to honor his tribute to music history, we should all wish him well." With Baltes' departure, Hoffmann remains the last member of the original lineup in the band.

Baltes was filled in on bass by Danny Silvestri for the band's performance at the 2019 edition of the 70000 Tons of Metal cruise. On 16 April 2019, former Uli Jon Roth sideman Martin Motnik was announced as Baltes' permanent replacement. Three days later, Accept released a special seven-inch single called "Life's a Bitch", which was their first song in two years and first one without Baltes.

On 1 November 2019, Accept announced that Philip Shouse, previously a touring member, had joined the band as their third guitarist, thus converting Accept to a sextet.

On 2 October 2020, Accept released "The Undertaker" as the first single from their upcoming sixteenth studio album Too Mean to Die, released on 29 January 2021. Their sixteenth studio album Too Mean to Die only narrowly missed the top of the German charts. It was recorded during the COVID-19 pandemic in Nashville and produced by Andy Sneap in the UK. About their then-new album, the band said: "We are too mean to die! Weeds don't go away! Accept won't get down!" Touring in support of the album began 2 July 2021 at Penn's Peak in Pennsylvania. The touring cycle of Too Mean to Die lasted for nearly two years, which included a headlining U.S. tour in the fall of 2022 with Narcotic Wasteland, followed by a European tour in January and February 2023 with Phil Campbell and the Bastard Sons. The latter tour was initially scheduled to take place in January and February 2022, but the COVID-19 pandemic meant that it would be postponed for a year.

On 17 February 2022, Accept announced that they had signed a worldwide deal with Napalm Records. In July, Hoffmann announced that the band had begun working on new material for the follow-up to Too Mean to Die. Accept toured in early 2023. In June 2023, bassist Martin Motnik confirmed that Accept had begun demoing songs for the album. On 6 February 2024, the band announced Humanoid as the title of the album and that it would be released on 26 April, with a supporting tour to follow. The band played Wacken Open Air in August of 2024.

On 25 September 2025, Accept announced that they had parted ways with guitarist Uwe Lulis, and instead of replacing him, would revert to "the traditional two guitar player lineup".

=== 50th anniversary celebration (2026–present) ===
To coincide with their 50th anniversary, Accept released a greatest hits collaboration album on 4 September 2026, titled Teutonic Titans 1976–2026. It includes contributions by Billy Corgan, Sebastian Bach, current or former members of Judas Priest, Scorpions, Ghost, Pantera, Overkill, Testament, and individual members of the "Big Four" of thrash metal bands (Metallica's Kirk Hammett, Anthrax's Frank Bello, former Megadeth bassist David Ellefson, and current Slayer and longtime Exodus guitarist Gary Holt).

== Legacy ==
Accept has been cited as an influence or inspiration by a number of acts, including Metallica, Megadeth, Slayer, Pantera, Testament, Anthrax, Guns N' Roses, Mötley Crüe, Alice in Chains, Soundgarden, Overkill, Exodus, and Annihilator, as well as fellow Germans such as Helloween, Blind Guardian, Doro, Sodom, Rage, and Grave Digger.

== Band members ==
Current

- Wolf Hoffmann – lead guitar, backing vocals (1976–1989, 1992–1997, 2005, 2009–present)
- Mark Tornillo – lead vocals (2009–present)
- Christopher Williams – drums, backing vocals (2015–present)
- Martin Motnik – bass, backing vocals (2019–present)
- Philip Shouse – rhythm guitar, backing vocals (2019–present)

== Discography ==
Studio albums

- Accept (1979)
- I'm a Rebel (1980)
- Breaker (1981)
- Restless and Wild (1982)
- Balls to the Wall (1983)
- Metal Heart (1985)
- Russian Roulette (1986)
- Eat the Heat (1989)
- Objection Overruled (1993)
- Death Row (1994)
- Predator (1996)
- Blood of the Nations (2010)
- Stalingrad (2012)
- Blind Rage (2014)
- The Rise of Chaos (2017)
- Too Mean to Die (2021)
- Humanoid (2024)

== In popular culture ==
In the second season of Justified, the character Coover is frequently seen with an Accept shirt on.

In season four of Stranger Things, Eddie Munson wears an Accept pin on his vest.

=== Accept songs in other media ===
Songs from Breaker album

- The German 1982 movie Night of the Wolves included an excerpt of "Starlight" as well as a glimpse of the album cover for Breaker as the female lead puts the record on. "Run if You Can" is also featured in the film, and both songs appeared on the soundtrack album.

"Fast as a Shark"

- Italian film Dèmoni (1985)
- Film People Like Us (2012)
- Action/adventure video game Brütal Legend

"Balls to the Wall"

- PlayStation 2 game Guitar Hero Encore: Rocks the 80s
- PSP/PS2 game Grand Theft Auto: Vice City Stories
- Downloadable content for the multi-platform guitar teaching game Rocksmith
- Film The Wrestler (2008)
- Film Balls to the Wall (2011) directed by Penelope Spheeris
- TV show Beavis and Butt-Head episode "Tornado", in which the title characters ridicule the video

"Zombie Apocalypse"

- Video game Saints Row
