= Peter Baltes =

German bassist (born 1958)

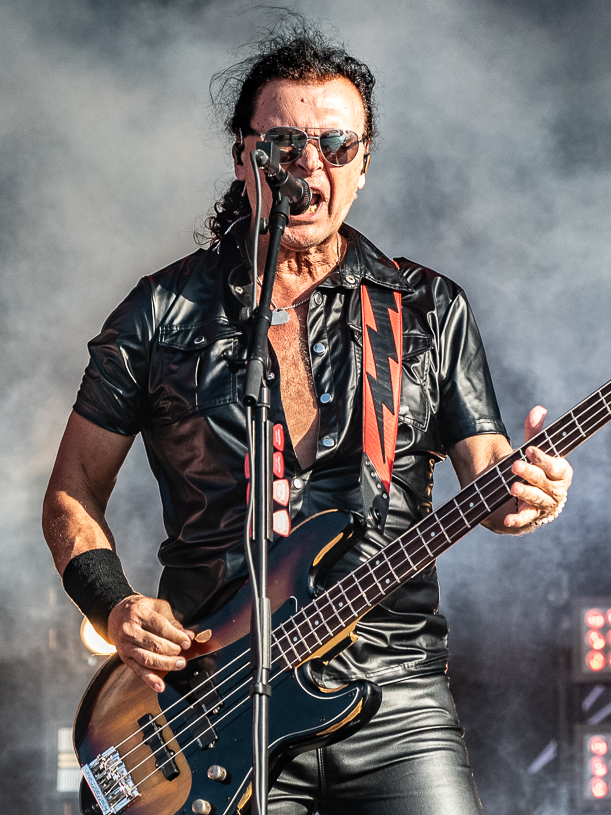
- Baltes in 2025

Background information
- Born: 4 April 1958 (age 68); Solingen, West Germany
- Genres: Heavy metal
- Occupation: Bassist
- Years active: 1976–present
- Member of: U.D.O.; Dirkschneider
- Formerly of: Accept; Dokken

Peter Baltes (born 4 April 1958) is a German musician, best known as former bassist of heavy metal band Accept and as current bassist of U.D.O.

== Career ==
He started out in the Solingen prog rock band Pythagoras in the 1970s but is best known as the former bassist of the heavy metal group Accept, having played bass guitar on their first 15 albums. He joined them in 1976 after Dieter Rubach left the band and also made minor contributions as a lead vocalist with Accept on their early albums and on the album Predator of 1996.

After 42 years as a member, Baltes announced his departure from Accept in November 2018; the band later replaced him with former Uli Jon Roth sideman Martin Motnik. In 2023, Baltes joined U.D.O. and Dirkschneider alongside his former Accept band mate, Udo Dirkschneider.

Outside of Accept, Baltes has sung background vocals on the Scorpions' Savage Amusement album and has played bass on John Norum's albums Face the Truth, Worlds Away, and more.

Baltes played bass on all but two tracks on Dokken's debut album, Breaking The Chains, after regular bassist Juan Croucier "missed the deadline to get to Germany" for recording. Baltes reportedly recorded all the parts in one night. Baltes later performed bass and background vocals on Don Dokken's solo effort Up from the Ashes.
