= List of Sodom band members =

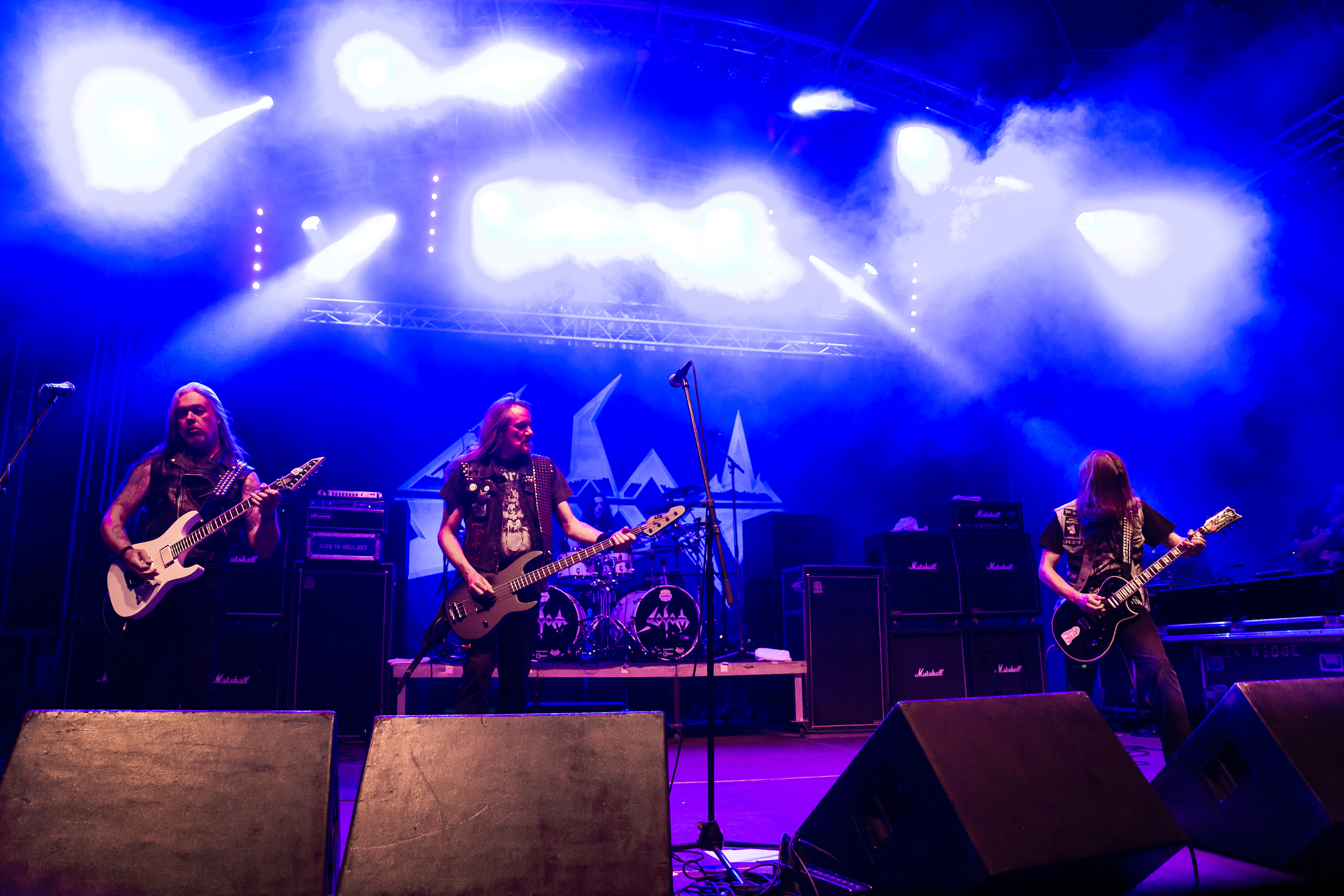
Sodom performing live in 2022.

Sodom is a German thrash metal band from Gelsenkirchen. Formed in 1982, the group was originally a trio consisting of guitarist and vocalist Frank "Aggressor" Terstegen, bassist Tom "Angelripper" Such, and drummer Rainer "Bloody Monster" Focke, the latter of whom was quickly replaced by Christian "Witchhunter" Dudek. As of 2025, Such (who has also performed vocals since Terstegen's departure in 1984) is the only remaining original member of the band, which includes guitarists Frank "Blackfire" Gosdzik (who rejoined in 2018 after an initial 1986–1989 tenure) and Yorck Segatz (since 2018) and drummer Toni Merkel (since 2020).

== History ==
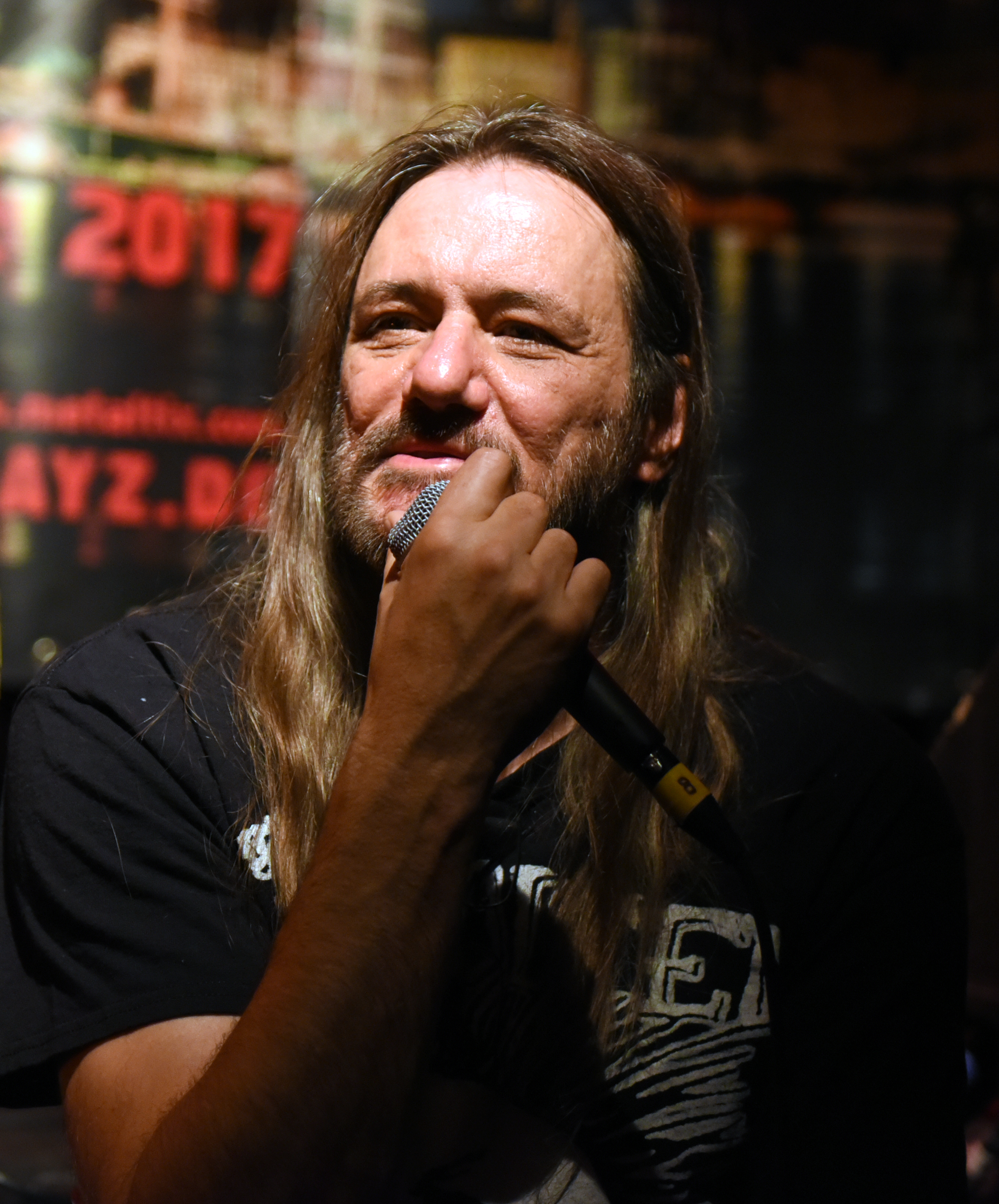
Tom "Angelripper" Such has been Sodom's frontman since founder Frank "Aggressor" Terstegen left in mid-1984.

=== 1982–1992 ===
Sodom was formed in April 1982 by guitarist and vocalist Frank "Aggressor" Terstegen and drummer Rainer "Bloody Monster" Focke, who added Tom "Angelripper" Such on bass "about half a year later". By early 1983, Focke had been replaced by Christian "Witchhunter" Dudek, with the new lineup recording the band's first two demos, Witching Metal and Victims of Death. In mid-1984, Terstegen was fired after "constantly badmouthing" his bandmates according to Dudek, replaced by Josef "Grave Violator" Dominic. After the recording of the band's first EP In the Sign of Evil, Dominic left for personal reasons after just five months in January 1985.

Dominic's replacement on guitar was Michael "Destructor" Wulf, who debuted on the band's full-length debut album, Obsessed by Cruelty. He left shortly after the album was recorded, with Uwe "Ahäthoor" Christoffers taking his place on a stand-in basis. During his short tenure, Christoffers performed on a re-recorded version of Obsessed by Cruelty released in the German market. By the end of the year, Frank "Blackfire" Gosdzik had taken over as the band's guitarist, debuting on the 1987 EP Expurse of Sodomy. This lineup remained stable for several years, releasing Persecution Mania in 1987, Mortal Way of Live in 1988 and Agent Orange in 1989.

In August 1989, a few weeks before the tour for Agent Orange, Gosdzik left Sodom for "personal reasons", replacing Jörg "Tritze" Trzebiatowski in Kreator. For the first run of shows, he was replaced by stand-in Uwe Baltrusch from Mekong Delta, before Michael Hoffmann took over from around October. Hoffmann performed on the 1990 album Better Off Dead, before moving to Brazil. He was replaced in November 1991 by Andy "Riff Randall" Brings. The new lineup released Tapping the Vein in 1992, before long-time drummer Dudek was fired due to problems with alcohol abuse, playing his last show with the band at the end of December.

=== 1993–2010 ===
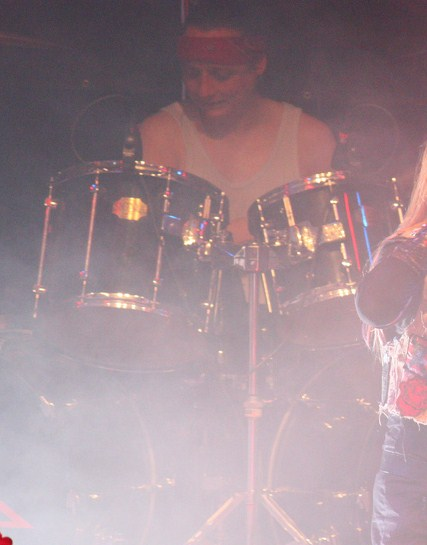
Guido "Atomic Steif" Richter was the band's first drummer after Christian "Witchhunter" Dudek was fired at the end of 1992.

At the beginning of 1993, former Living Death and Holy Moses drummer Guido "Atomic Steif" Richter was brought in to replace Chris Witchhunter. The new lineup released Aber bitte mit Sahne and Get What You Deserve, touring in promotion of the latter until the summer of 1994, after which Brings left due to "personal problems". He was soon replaced by Dirk "Strahli" Strahlmeier, who performed on the 1995 album Masquerade in Blood. Shortly after its recording, however, the guitarist was imprisoned for dealing drugs. Richter chose to leave shortly thereafter, claiming that "Sodom didn't work as a band anymore" and blaming frontman Tom Angelripper for being "not a fair partner".

In 1996, Angelripper introduced a new lineup for Sodom which included Bernd "Bernemann" Kost on guitar and Konrad "Bobby" Schottkowski, the pair of whom he had met while working with them on recordings for their previous band Randalica. This lineup became the most stable in the band's history, releasing the albums 'Til Death Do Us Unite (1997), Code Red (1999), M-16 (2001), One Night in Bangkok (2003), Sodom (2006) and In War and Pieces. During 2007, the 1984–1985 lineup of Sodom with guitarist Grave Violator and drummer Chris "Witchhunter" Dudek reunited temporarily to record The Final Sign of Evil, a new version of their first EP In the Sign of Evil with some new tracks. This was Dudek's last appearance with Sodom, as he died on 7 September 2008 of organ failure, caused by his ongoing problems with alcohol abuse. Also in 2007, former Sodom guitarists Grave Violator, Frank Blackfire, Michael Hoffmann and Andy Brings, and drummer Atomic Steif, performed with the band at the Wacken Open Air Festival.

=== Since 2010 ===
Just after the November 2010 release of In War and Pieces, it was announced that Bobby Schottkowski had left Sodom due to "personal and private problems" with Tom Angelripper. He was replaced the following week by former Despair and Voodoocult drummer Markus "Makka" Freiwald. This lineup released Epitome of Torture in 2013, Sacred Warpath in 2014 and Decision Day in 2016. In December 2017, to mark the 35th anniversary of the band, Sodom performed with former guitarists Grave Violator, Frank Blackfire and Andy Brings. Just a couple of weeks later, Angelripper announced the departure of Bernd Kost and Markus Freiwald, claiming that he wanted "to start all over again with fresh and hungry musicians". The pair later claimed that they had "drifted apart" from the frontman, who ultimately fired them via a WhatsApp message.

At the end of January 2018, Sodom announced that Frank Blackfire had returned to the band, with new members Yorck Segatz (second guitar) and Stefan "Husky" Hüskens (drums) completing the band's new lineup — their first to date with four members. This incarnation released three EPs — Partisan, Chosen by the Grace of God and Out of the Frontline Trench — before Hüskens left in January 2020 due to scheduling conflicts with his full-time job. He was replaced a week later by Toni Merkel. The band released Genesis XIX in 2020, a re-recording of Persecution Mania track "Bombenhagel" in 2021, the re-recordings collection 40 Years at War in 2022, and The Arsonist in 2025.

== Members ==
=== Current ===
Image	Name	Years active	Instruments	Release contributions
	Tom "Angelripper" Such	1982–present	bass; vocals (since 1984)	all Sodom releases
	Frank "Blackfire" Gosdzik	1986–1989; 2018–present (plus live one-offs in 2007 and 2017)	lead guitar	Expurse of Sodomy (1987); Persecution Mania (1987); Mortal Way of Live (1988); Agent Orange (1989); Lords of Depravity Part II (2010); all Sodom releases from Partisan (2018) onwards
	Yorck Segatz	2018–present	rhythm guitar	all Sodom releases from Partisan (2018) onwards
	Toni Merkel	2020–present	drums	all Sodom releases from Genesis XIX (2020) onwards

=== Former ===
Image	Name	Years active	Instruments	Release contributions
	Frank "Aggressor" Terstegen	1982–1984	lead guitar; vocals	Witching Metal (1983); Victims of Death (1984)
	Rainer "Bloody Monster" Focke	1982–1983	drums	none
	Christian "Witchhunter" Dudek	1983–1992 (plus session during 2007) (died 2008)	drums; percussion	all Sodom releases from Witching Metal (1983) to Tapping the Vein (1992); The Final Sign of Evil (2007)
	Josef "Grave Violator" Dominik	1984–1985 (plus session and live one-off 2007)	lead guitar	In the Sign of Evil (1985); The Final Sign of Evil (2007); Lords of Depravity Part II (2010)
	Michael "Destructor" Wulf	1985 (died 1993)	lead guitar	Obsessed by Cruelty (1986)
	Michael Hoffmann	1989–1990 (plus live one-off in 2007)	lead guitar	Better Off Dead (1990); Lords of Depravity Part II (2010)
	Andy "Riff Randall" Brings	1991–1994 (plus live one-offs in 2007 and 2017)	lead guitar; backing vocals	Tapping the Vein (1992); Aber bitte mit Sahne (1993); Get What You Deserve (1994); Marooned Live (1994)
	Guido "Atomic Steif" Richter	1993–1995 (plus live one-off in 2007) (died 2025)	drums	Aber bitte mit Sahne (1993); Get What You Deserve (1994); Marooned Live (1994); Masquerade in Blood (1995)
	Dirk "Strahli" Strahlmeier	1994–1995 (died 2011)	lead guitar	Masquerade in Blood (1995)
	Bernd "Bernemann" Kost	1996–2018	lead guitar	all Sodom releases from 'Til Death Do Us Unite (1997) to Decision Day (2016), except The Final Sign of Evil (2007)
	Konrad "Bobby" Schottkowski	1996–2010	drums; percussion	all Sodom releases from 'Til Death Do Us Unite (1997) to In War and Pieces (2010), except The Final Sign of Evil (2007)
	Markus "Makka" Freiwald	2010–2018	drums; percussion	The Big Teutonic 4 (2012); Epitome of Torture (2013); Sacred Warpath (2014); Decision Day (2016)
	Stefan "Husky" Hüskens	2018–2020	drums; percussion	Partisan (2018); Chosen by the Grace of God (2019); Out of the Frontline Trench (2019)

=== Touring ===
Image	Name	Years active	Instruments	Details
	Uwe "Ahäthoor" Christoffers	1985–1986 (died 2022)	lead guitar	Christoffers filled in for a few months after Michael "Destructor" Wulf's departure in late 1985. During this time, he contributed to a re-recorded version of Obsessed by Cruelty released in Germany.
	Uwe Baltrusch	1989	lead guitar	Baltrusch filled in for the first part of the Agent Orange tour after Frank Blackfire's summer 1989 departure.

== Lineups ==
Note: Names in bold indicate new additions to the band's lineup.

Period	Members	Releases
April–fall 1982	Frank Terstegen — guitars, vocals; Rainer Focke — drums	none
Late 1982–early 1983	Frank Terstegen — guitars, vocals; Rainer Focke — drums; Tom Angelripper — bass	none
Early 1983–mid 1984	Frank Terstegen — guitars, vocals; Tom Angelripper — bass; Chris Witchhunter — drums	Witching Metal (1983); Victims of Death (1984)
August 1984–January 1985	Tom Angelripper — bass, vocals; Chris Witchhunter — drums, percussion; Grave Violator — guitars	In the Sign of Evil (1985)
January–late 1985	Tom Angelripper — bass, vocals; Chris Witchhunter — drums, percussion; Michael Wulf — guitars	Obsessed by Cruelty (1986)
Late 1985–late 1986	Tom Angelripper — bass, vocals; Chris Witchhunter — drums, percussion; Uwe Christoffers — guitars (stand-in)	Obsessed by Cruelty (1986)
Late 1986–August 1989	Tom Angelripper — bass, lead vocals; Chris Witchhunter — drums, percussion; Frank Blackfire — guitars, backing vocals	Expurse of Sodomy (1987); Persecution Mania (1987); Mortal Way of Live (1988); Agent Orange (1989)
Summer/fall 1989	Tom Angelripper — bass, vocals; Chris Witchhunter — drums, percussion; Uwe Baltrusch — guitars (stand-in)	none
Fall 1989–fall 1991	Tom Angelripper — bass, vocals; Chris Witchhunter — drums, percussion; Michael Hoffmann — guitars	Better Off Dead (1990)
November 1991–December 1992	Tom Angelripper — bass, lead vocals; Chris Witchhunter — drums, percussion; Andy Brings — guitars, backing vocals	Tapping the Vein (1992)
Early 1993–summer 1994	Tom Angelripper — bass, lead vocals; Andy Brings — guitars, backing vocals; Atomic Steif — drums	Aber bitte mit Sahne (1993); Get What You Deserve (1994); Marooned Live (1994)
Fall 1994–early 1995	Tom Angelripper — bass, vocals; Atomic Steif — drums; Dirk Strahlmeier — guitars	Masquerade in Blood (1995)
1996–November 2010	Tom Angelripper — bass, vocals; Bernd Kost — guitars; Bobby Schottkowski — drums, percussion	'Til Death Do Us Unite (1997); Code Red (1999); M-16 (2001); One Night in Bangkok (2003); Lords of Depravity Part I (2005); Sodom (2006); Lords of Depravity Part II (2007); In War and Pieces (2010)
2007 (temporary recording lineup)	Tom Angelripper — bass, vocals; Chris Witchhunter — drums; Grave Violator — guitars	The Final Sign of Evil (2007)
December 2010–January 2018	Tom Angelripper — bass, vocals; Bernd Kost — guitars; Markus Freiwald — drums, percussion	The Big Teutonic 4 (2012); Epitome of Torture (2013); Sacred Warpath (2014); Decision Day (2016)
January 2018–January 2020	Tom Angelripper — bass, vocals; Frank Blackfire — lead guitar; Yorck Segatz — rhythm guitar; Stefan Hüskens — drums	Partisan (2018); Chosen by the Grace of God (2019); Out of the Frontline Trench (2019)
January 2020–present	Tom Angelripper — bass, vocals; Frank Blackfire — lead guitar; Yorck Segatz — rhythm guitar; Toni Merkel — drums	Genesis XIX (2020); Bombenhagel (2021); 40 Years at War: The Greatest Hell of Sodom (2022); The Arsonist (2025)
