= Sodom discography =

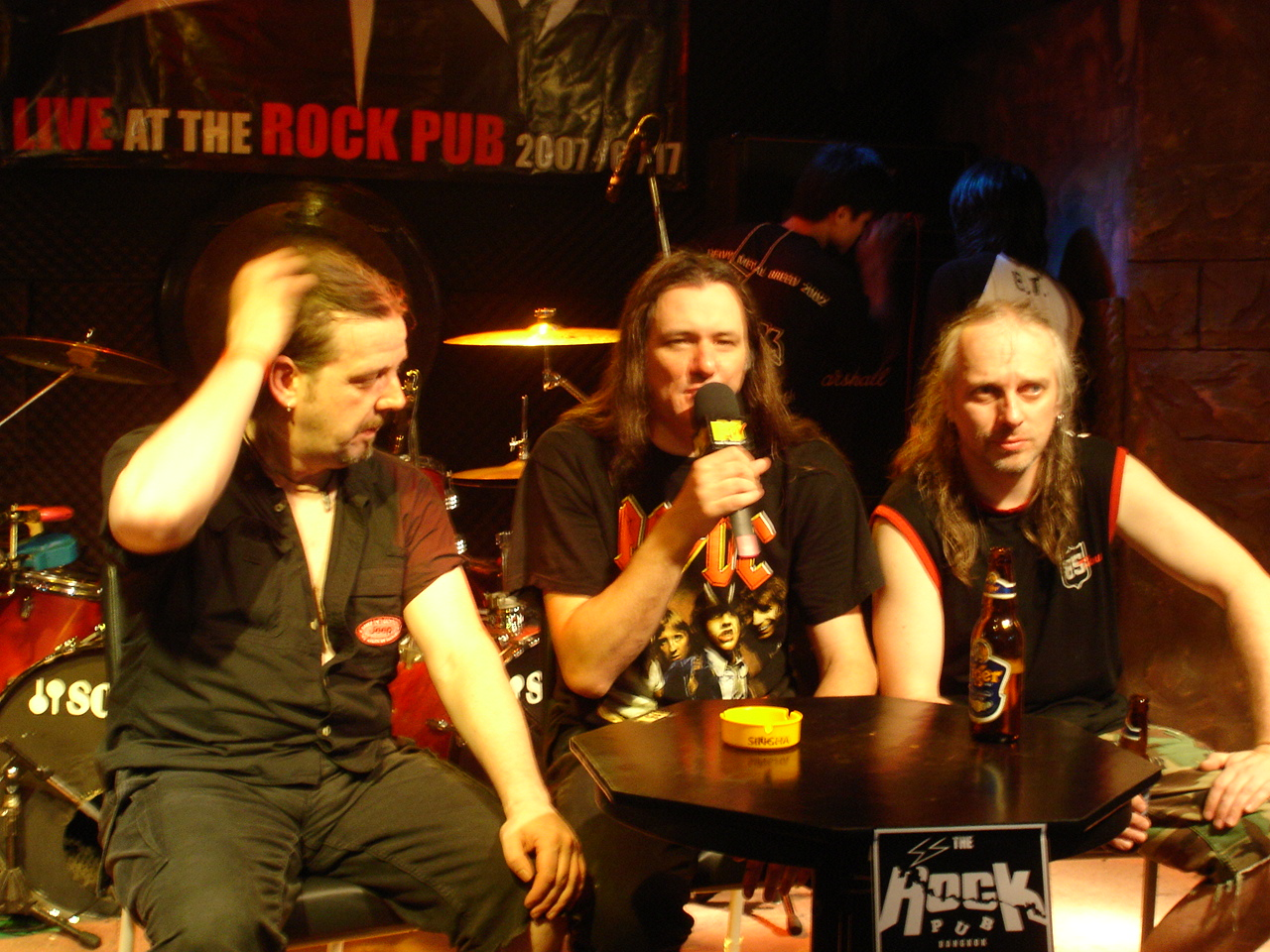
- Sodom in 2007
- Studio albums: 17
- Extended plays: 7
- Live albums: 3
- Compilation albums: 3
- Singles: 3
- Video albums: 3
- Demos: 2

The following is a comprehensive discography of Sodom, a German thrash metal band. Formed in 1982, they have so far released sixteen studio albums, three live albums, two compilations, a DVD, two EPs, three singles, and two demos.

The band are considered one of the three biggest Teutonic thrash metal acts, the other two being Kreator and Destruction. While the other two bands developed a sound that has influenced death metal, Sodom created a sound that has influenced many black metal bands that formed in the late 1980s and the 1990s.

== Albums ==
=== Studio albums ===
List of studio albums, with selected details
Year	Album details	Notes
1986	Obsessed by Cruelty: Released: May 1986; Label: Steamhammer; Formats: LP, CD, cassette	Two versions of Obsessed by Cruelty were issued in a short space of time. The original mix was pressed up, but then not found to be satisfactory and so the entire album was remixed.
1987	Persecution Mania: Released: December 1987; Label: Steamhammer	"A virtual tour de force of blinding speed and blunt force, it is also arguably the best album of Sodom's checkered career."
1989	Agent Orange: Released: June 1989; Label: Steamhammer	
1990	Better Off Dead: Released: October 1990; Label: Steamhammer	
1992	Tapping the Vein: Released: August 1992; Label: Steamhammer	"... Sodom attempted to make the transition from thrash to death themselves with 1992's Tapping the Vein."
1994	Get What You Deserve: Released: January 1994; Label: Steamhammer	
1995	Masquerade in Blood: Released: June 1995; Label: Steamhammer	
1997	'Til Death Do Us Unite: Released: 24 February 1997; Label: Steamhammer	
1999	Code Red: Released: 31 May 1999; Label: Drakkar	
2001	M-16: Released: 22 October 2001; Label: Steamhammer	
2006	Sodom: Released: 21 April 2006; Label: Steamhammer	"Following the best 3 albums of their career and a five-year hiatus, their self-titled umpteenth album rekindles all the elemental power that won them so many denim-clad followers in the eighties."
2007	The Final Sign of Evil: Released: 28 September 2007; Label: Steamhammer	The Final Sign of Evil contains a complete re-recording of their 1984 EP In the Sign of Evil and previously unreleased material not included on the EP.
2010	In War and Pieces: Released: 19 November 2010 (Germany), 22 November 2010 (Europe), 11 January 2011 (USA); Label: Steamhammer	
2013	Epitome of Torture: Released: 26 April 2013 (Germany), 7 May 2013 (USA); Label: Steamhammer	
2016	Decision Day: Released: 26 August 2016 (Germany); Label: Steamhammer	
2020	Genesis XIX: Released: 27 November 2020; Label: Steamhammer	
2025	The Arsonist: Released: 27 June 2025; Label: Steamhammer	

=== Live albums ===
Year	Album details	Notes
1988	Mortal Way of Live: Released: October 1988; Label: Steamhammer	Sodom toured Europe in 1988 with Whiplash and recorded Mortal Way of Life, the "first ever double live thrash [metal] album".
1994	Marooned Live: Released: September 1994; Label: Steamhammer	
2003	One Night in Bangkok: Released: 28 July 2003; Label: Steamhammer	

=== Compilation albums ===
Year	Album details	Notes
1996	Ten Black Years: Released: 2 December 1996; Label: Steamhammer	"As was the case with their very uneven career, Sodom's two-disc 'greatest-hits' set, Ten Black Years, is not the sort of collection one can easily appreciate when heard from start to finish."
2012	30 Years Sodomized: 1982-2012: Released: 25 June 2012; Label: Steamhammer	
2022	40 Years at War – The Greatest Hell of Sodom: Released: 28 October 2022; Label: Steamhammer	

== Extended plays ==
Year	EP details	Notes
1985	In the Sign of Evil: Released: 1985; Label: Steamhammer; Formats: LP, CD, cassette	Line-up: Angelripper – vocals, bass; Grave Violator – guitars; Witchhunter – drums; Re-released in 1988 (and in 2001) with Obsessed by Cruelty on same disc by SPV.
1987	Expurse of Sodomy: Released: March 1987; Label: Steamhammer; Formats: LP, cassette	Was also released as a picture disc. Line-up: Frank Godsdzik (aka Blackfire) – guitar; Christian Dudeck (aka Witchhunter) – drums; Thomas Such (aka Tom Angelripper) – bass, vocals
1989	Ausgebombt: Released: 11 September 1989; Label: Steamhammer	
1991	The Saw Is the Law: Released: January 1991; Label: Steamhammer	
1993	Aber bitte mit Sahne: Released: October 1993; Label: Steamhammer	
2014	Sacred Warpath: Released: 28 November 2014; Label: Steamhammer	
2018	Partisan: Released: 23 November 2018; Label: Napalm Records	
2019	Chosen by the Grace of God: Released: 30 October 2019; Label: Legacy Magazine	
2019	Out of the Frontline Trench: Released: 22 November 2019; Label: SPV/Steamhammer	
2020	A Handful of Bullets: Released: 18 November 2020; Label: Rock Hard	
2023	1982: Released: 10 November 2023; Label: SPV/Steamhammer	

== Singles ==
Year	Song details	Notes
1989	"Ausgebombt": Released: 11 September 1989; Label: Steamhammer	
1991	"The Saw Is the Law": Released: January 1991; Label: Steamhammer	
1993	"Aber bitte mit Sahne": Released: October 1993; Label: Steamhammer	
2022	"1982": Released: 12 August 2022; Label: Steamhammer	

== Video albums ==
Year	Video details	Notes
1988	Mortal Way of Live: Label: Sound & Vision; Format: VHS	
1994	Live in der Zeche Carl: Released: December 1994; Label: Steamhammer; Format: VHS	
2005	Lords of Depravity, Pt. 1: Released: 18 November 2005; Label: Steamhammer; Format: DVD	"A mix of biography and live onslaught, Lords of Depravity documents Sodom's career from 1982 to 1995."
2010	Lords of Depravity II: Released: 28 June 2010; Label: Steamhammer; Format: DVD	"Disc 1 features a band documentary, focusing from 1995–2009. Disc 2 includes live footage, video clips and deleted scenes 3 hours in length."

== Demo albums ==
Year	Album details	Notes
1982	Witching Metal (fi) (pt): Released: 1982; Label: self-released; Formats: cassette	Line-up: Aggressor – guitar, vocals; Witchhunter – drums; Angelripper – bass, vocals
1984	Victims of Death (fi) (pt): Released: 1984; Label: self-released; Formats: cassette	"Satan's Conjuration" is an early version of the song "Conjuration" off Persecution Mania. The main riff on the song "Witching Metal" on this demo is a bit different from the version of In the Sign of Evil. Line-up: Frank Testegen (aka Aggressor) – guitar, vocals; Christian Dudeck (aka Witchhunter) – drums; Thomas Such (aka Tom Angelripper) – bass, vocals
