= 30 Years Sodomized: 1982–2012 =

Box set by Sodom
- Released: 25 June 2012
- Genre: Thrash metal, black metal
- Length: 253:24
- Label: Steamhammer

Sodom chronology
In War and Pieces (2010)	30 Years Sodomized: 1982–2012 (2012)	Epitome of Torture (2013)

30 Years Sodomized: 1982–2012 is a three-disc, two-LP box set by German thrash metal band Sodom, released on 25 June 2012. The set includes the albums Official Bootleg: The Witchhunter Decade, a collection of live recordings and unreleased demos, and 30 Years' War, a retrospective selection of studio tracks personally compiled by Tom Angelripper.

== Track listing ==
=== Disc one: The Witchhunter Decade ===
No.	Title	Writer(s)	Length
1.	"Sepulchral Voice (Rehearsal, 1984)"	Tom Angelripper, Josef "Grave Violator" Dominik, Chris Witchhunter	4:41
2.	"Obsessed by Cruelty (Live in Belgium, 1985)"	Angelripper, Michael "Destructor" Wulf, Witchhunter	4:37
3.	"After the Deluge (Live at Metallize Festival, 1986)"	Angelripper, Uwe Christophers, Witchhunter	4:56
4.	"Conjuration (Live at Scum, Holland, 1987)"	Angelripper, Frank "Aggressor" Testegen, Witchhunter	5:04
5.	"Proselytism Real (Live at Metallize Festival, 1987)"	Angelripper, Wulf, Witchhunter	3:51
6.	"Conqueror (Live in Holland, 1987)"	Angelripper, Frank Blackfire, Witchhunter	3:18
7.	"My Atonement (Live at Scum, Holland, 1987)"	Angelripper, Blackfire, Witchhunter	3:47
8.	"Outbreak of Evil (Live in Germany, Zeche Bochum, 1988)"	Angelripper, Testegen, Witchhunter	3:19
9.	"Persecution Mania (Live in Switzerland, Sargans, 1988)"	Angelripper, Blackfire, Witchhunter	4:34
10.	"Magic Dragon (Live in Germany, Braunschweig, 1989)"	Angelripper, Blackfire, Witchhunter	5:41
11.	"Shellfire Defense (Pre-production, 1990)"	Angelripper, Michael Hoffman, Witchhunter	4:16
12.	"The Saw is the Law (Pre-production, 1990)"	Angelripper, Hoffman, Witchhunter	4:26
13.	"Bloodtrails (Pre-production, 1990)"	Angelripper, Hoffman, Witchhunter	4:41
14.	"Body Parts (Live in Japan, 1992)"	Angelripper, Andy Brings, Witchhunter	3:09
15.	"Skinned Alive (Live at WDR Festival, 1992)"	Angelripper, Brings, Witchhunter	2:46
16.	"Sons of Hell (Demo)"	Angelripper, Dominik, Witchhunter	4:07

=== Disc two: 30 Years' War ===
No.	Title	Writer(s)	Original album	Length
1.	"Burst Command 'til War"	Tom Angelripper, Josef "Grave Violator" Dominik, Chris Witchhunter	In the Sign of Evil	2:44
2.	"Brandish the Sceptre"	Angelripper, Michael "Destructor" Wulf, Witchhunter	Obsessed by Cruelty	2:54
3.	"My Atonement"	Angelripper, Frank Blackfire, Witchhunter	Expurse of Sodomy	6:03
4.	"Electrocution"	Angelripper, Blackfire, Witchhunter	Persecution Mania	3:14
5.	"Christ Passion"	Angelripper, Blackfire, Witchhunter	Persecution Mania	6:12
6.	"Tired and Red"	Angelripper, Blackfire, Witchhunter	Agent Orange	5:26
7.	"Baptism of Fire"	Angelripper, Blackfire, Witchhunter	Agent Orange	4:04
8.	"The Saw is the Law (Splatting Version)"	Angelripper, Blackfire, Witchhunter	Better Off Dead	5:51
9.	"Shellfire Defense"	Angelripper, Michael Hoffman, Witchhunter	Better Off Dead	4:22
10.	"Tarred and Feathered"	Angelripper, Hoffman, Witchhunter	Better Off Dead	3:02
11.	"The Crippler"	Angelripper, Andy Brings, Witchhunter	Tapping the Vein	4:10
12.	"Reincarnation"	Angelripper, Brings, Witchhunter	Tapping the Vein	7:50
13.	"Sodomized"	Angelripper, Brings, Guido "Atomic Steif" Richter	Aber bitte mit Sahne	2:44
14.	"Delight in Slaying"	Angelripper, Brings, Richter	Get What You Deserve	2:39
15.	"Into Perdition"	Angelripper, Brings, Richter	Get What You Deserve	2:44

=== Disc three: 30 Years' War ===
No.	Title	Writer(s)	Original album	Length
1.	"Gathering of Minds"	Tom Angelripper, Dirk "Strahli" Strahlmeier, Guido "Atomic Steif" Richter	Masquerade in Blood	4:18
2.	"Unwanted Youth"	Angelripper, Strahlmeier, Richter	Masquerade in Blood	3:32
3.	"Scum"	Angelripper, Strahlmeier, Richter	Masquerade in Blood	5:08
4.	"Tombstone"	Angelripper, Bernd "Bernemann" Kost, Bobby Schottkowski	Code Red	3:56
5.	"Warlike Conspiracy"	Angelripper, Kost, Schottkowski	Code Red	2:50
6.	"Spiritual Demise"	Angelripper, Kost, Chris Witchhunter	Code Red	2:52
7.	"Book Burning"	Angelripper, Kost, Schottkowski	Code Red	2:35
8.	"Minejumper"	Angelripper, Kost, Schottkowski	M-16	3:11
9.	"Genocide"	Angelripper, Kost, Schottkowski	M-16	4:49
10.	"Where Angels Die"	Angelripper, Josef "Grave Violator" Dominik, Witchhunter	The Final Sign of Evil	4:47
11.	"Hatred of the Gods"	Angelripper, Dominik, Witchhunter	The Final Sign of Evil	3:14
12.	"Lords of Depravity"	Angelripper, Kost, Schottkowski	Sodom	2:49
13.	"Kamikaze Terrorizer"	Angelripper, Kost, Schottkowski	Sodom	3:43
14.	"In War and Pieces"	Angelripper, Kost, Schottkowski	In War and Pieces	4:12
15.	"Hellfire"	Angelripper, Kost, Schottkowski	In War and Pieces	3:06

=== LP one: The Witchhunter Decade ===
==== Side one ====
No.	Title	Writer(s)	Length
1.	"Sepulchral Voice (Rehearsal, 1984)"	Tom Angelripper, Josef "Grave Violator" Dominik, Chris Witchhunter	4:41
2.	"Obsessed by Cruelty (Live in Belgium, 1985)"	Angelripper, Michael "Destructor" Wulf, Witchhunter	4:37
3.	"After the Deluge (Live at Metallize Festival, 1986)"	Angelripper, Uwe Christophers, Witchhunter	4:56
4.	"Conjuration (Live at Scum, Holland, 1987)"	Angelripper, Frank "Aggressor" Testegen, Witchhunter	5:04

==== Side two ====
No.	Title	Writer(s)	Length
5.	"Proselytism Real (Live at Metallize Festival, 1987)"	Angelripper, Wulf, Witchhunter	3:51
6.	"Conqueror (Live in Holland, 1987)"	Angelripper, Frank Blackfire, Witchhunter	3:18
7.	"My Atonement (Live at Scum, Holland, 1987)"	Angelripper, Blackfire, Witchhunter	3:47
8.	"Outbreak of Evil (Live in Germany, Zeche Bochum, 1988)"	Angelripper, Testegen, Witchhunter	3:19

=== LP two: The Witchhunter Decade ===
==== Side one ====
No.	Title	Writer(s)	Length
1.	"Persecution Mania (Live in Switzerland, Sargans, 1988)"	Tom Angelripper, Frank Blackfire, Chris Witchhunter	4:34
2.	"Magic Dragon (Live in Germany, Braunschweig, 1989)"	Angelripper, Blackfire, Witchhunter	5:41
3.	"Shellfire Defense (Pre-production, 1990)"	Angelripper, Michael Hoffman, Witchhunter	4:16
4.	"The Saw is the Law (Pre-production, 1990)"	Angelripper, Hoffman, Witchhunter	4:26

==== Side two ====
No.	Title	Writer(s)	Length
5.	"Bloodtrails (Pre-production, 1990)"	Angelripper, Hoffman, Witchhunter	4:41
6.	"Body Parts (Live in Japan, 1992)"	Angelripper, Andy Brings, Witchhunter	3:09
7.	"Skinned Alive (Live at WDR Festival, 1992)"	Angelripper, Brings, Witchhunter	2:46
8.	"Sons of Hell (Demo)"	Angelripper, Josef "Grave Violator" Dominik, Witchhunter	4:07

== Personnel ==
=== The Witchhunter Decade ===
- Tom Angelripper: vocals, bass
- Chris Witchhunter: drums
- Josef "Grave Violator" Dominik, guitar
- Uwe Christophers, guitar
- Frank Blackfire, guitar
- Michael Hoffman, guitar
- Andy Brings, guitar

=== 30 Years' War ===
- Tom Angelripper: vocals, bass (all tracks)
- Chris Witchhunter: drums, tracks 1–12 (disc one)
- Guido "Atomic Steif" Richter: drums, tracks 13–15 (disc one) and tracks 1–3 (disc two)
- Bobby Schottkowski: drums, tracks 4–15 (disc two)
- Josef "Grave Violator" Dominik: guitar, track 1 (disc one)
- Michael Wulf: guitar, track 2 (disc one)
- Frank Blackfire: guitar, tracks 3–7 (disc one)
- Michael Hoffman: guitar, tracks 8–10 (disc one)
- Andy Brings: guitar, tracks 11–15 (disc one)
- Dirk "Strahli" Strahlmeier: guitar, tracks 1–3 (disc two)
- Bernd "Bernemann" Kost: guitar, tracks 4–15 (disc two)

== Charts ==
Chart	Peak position
Germany Top 100 Albums	54
