= Nuclear winter (disambiguation) =

Nuclear winter is a hypothetical climatic effect of nuclear war.

It may also refer to:

- Nuclear Winter, an album by The Lonely Forest
- Nuclear Winter Volume 1 (2009) or Nuclear Winter Volume 2: Death Panel (2011), mixtape albums by Sole
- Nuclear Wintour, nickname for magazine editor Anna Wintour
- Nuclear Winter, a mode of the video game Fallout 76
- Nuclear Winter, a song from Sodom's second studio album, Persecution Mania
