= The Arsonist (Sodom album) =

Studio album by Sodom
- Released: 27 June 2025
- Recorded: 2024–2025
- Genre: Thrash metal
- Length: 48:47
- Label: Steamhammer
- Producer: Toni Merkel

Sodom chronology
Genesis XIX (2020)	The Arsonist (2025)

Singles from The Arsonist
- 1. "Trigger Discipline" Released: 9 April 2025; 2. "Witchhunter" Released: 7 May 2025; 3. "Taphephobia" Released: 4 June 2025

The Arsonist is the seventeenth studio album by German thrash metal band Sodom, released on 27 June 2025.

One of the album's songs, "Witchhunter", pays tribute to the band's original drummer Christian "Witchhunter" Dudek, while "A.W.T.F." is dedicated to original Tank frontman Algy Ward.

== Track listing ==
The Arsonist track listing
No.	Title	Writer(s)	Length
1.	"The Arsonist"	Sebastian Niehoff	1:02
2.	"Battle of Harvest Moon"	Frank Gosdzik; Thomas Such	4:12
3.	"Trigger Discipline"	Toni Merkel; Such	3:52
4.	"The Spirits That I Called"	Merkel; Such	2:57
5.	"Witchhunter"	Merkel; Such	3:13
6.	"Scavenger"	Yorck Segatz; Such	4:01
7.	"Gun Without Groom"	Merkel; Such	4:43
8.	"Taphephobia"	Merkel; Such	3:42
9.	"Sane Insanity"	Segatz; Such	4:03
10.	"A.W.T.F."	Merkel; Such	3:57
11.	"Twilight Void"	Gosdzik; Such	4:44
12.	"Obliteration of the Aeons"	Segatz; Such	3:53
13.	"Return to God in Parts"	Segatz; Such	4:28
Total length:			48:47

== Personnel ==
Sodom

- Thomas Such – bass guitar, vocals
- Frank Gosdzik – lead guitar
- Yorck Segatz – rhythm guitar
- Toni Merkel – drums, production, mixing

Additional contributors

- Sebastian Niehoff – mixing
- Joachim Heinz Ehrig – mastering

== Charts ==
Chart performance for The Arsonist
Chart (2025)	Peak position
Austrian Albums (Ö3 Austria)	7
French Rock & Metal Albums (SNEP)	40
German Albums (Offizielle Top 100)	4
Japanese Rock Albums (Oricon)	14
Japanese Top Albums Sales (Billboard Japan)	69
Japanese Western Albums (Oricon)	14
Polish Albums (ZPAV)	35
Swedish Hard Rock Albums (Sverigetopplistan)	12
Swedish Physical Albums (Sverigetopplistan)	4
Swiss Albums (Schweizer Hitparade)	14
