= Bassinvaders =

German heavy metal band

Bassinvaders (also known as Markus Grosskopf's Bassinvaders) is the bass guitar-focused side project of Helloween bassist Markus Grosskopf. The project is a unique heavy metal experiment which features only the bass guitar and does not include any conventional six-string electric or acoustic guitars. The project focuses on the bass guitar showcasing lead solo bass guitar, rhythm bass guitar and actual bass guitar along with accompanying drums.

The original project line-up consists of only Grosskopf himself, although many guest bassists, vocalists and drummers are featured in the debut album of the project.

== History ==
The side project was created and in the actual line up only features Markus Grosskopf, most notably the bass player for German power metal band Helloween and also a bassist for Tobias Sammet's symphonic metal project Avantasia and classic rock group Kickhunter.

While he was sitting in the bar and drinking, Grosskopf was inspired to create a bass guitar based band, which would feature no guitars at all, and instead will focus on the bass, and will feature a lead solo bass guitar, a rhythm bass guitar, and an actual bass guitar to play the bass parts, along with accompanying drums, and vocals. He came to Frontier Records with the idea in the beginning of 2007 and presented the concept to them. The record label was immediately intrigued and gave it a go.

For the project, Grosskopf invited some well-known singing bass players from the German heavy metal scene to join him and record with him. Those are Tom Angelripper (Sodom), Peavy Wagner (Rage) and Marcel Schirmer (Destruction).

To push the project ever further and add to the variety of the record, Markus invited some of his bass heroes to play solos on the record. He expected to get a response from two or three musicians, while ended up more than a dozen people to have a solo appearance on the record. Those include Billy Sheehan, Rudy Sarzo and Lee Rocker.

The band's first studio album, Hellbassbeaters, was released on 25 January 2008.

== Band members ==
- Markus Grosskopf — bass guitar, upright bass
- Marcel Schirmer — vocals, bass guitar
- Tom Angelripper — vocals, bass guitar
- Peter "Peavy" Wagner — vocals, bass guitar

== Discography ==
Release date	Title	Record label
25 January 2008	Hellbassbeaters	Frontier Records
