= Tapping the Vein =

Tapping the Vein may refer to:

- Phlebotomy
- Tapping the Vein, a comics series adaptation of Clive Barker's Books of Blood short stories
- Tapping the Vein (album), a 1992 album by Sodom
