= Teutonic thrash metal =

Music genre originating in Germany

- Stylistic origins: New wave of British heavy metal, thrash metal, speed metal, hardcore punk
- Cultural origins: 1980s, Central Europe

Teutonic thrash metal is a regional scene of thrash metal music that originated within German-speaking countries during the 1980s, and its title is a reference to the Germanic tribe. Along with Bay Area thrash metal, East Coast thrash metal, and Brazilian thrash metal, this was one of the major scenes of thrash metal in the 1980s, and it was developed and popularized by four German bands—Destruction, Kreator, Sodom, and Tankard—that have been referred to as "The Big Four of Teutonic Thrash". The label of "Big Four" has often been rejected, emerging from the belief that the influence and popularity of Tankard was far less than that of the other three, leading to the alternate title "the Teutonic Trio".

== History ==
Two bands influential to early Teutonic thrash metal were Destruction (from Lörrach) and Holy Moses (from Aachen). After hearing Venom, both bands soon changed their sound within a matter of weeks to their new and permanent style.

Other bands soon followed. In 1982, the Gelsenkirchen-based band Sodom released their first demo, Witching Metal. In their early days, Sodom were heavily influenced by the NWOBHM, to the point of crediting their trio lineup to bands like Motörhead, Tank, Raven, and Venom, who also featured power trio lineups. Their style featured raspy vocals, palm muted guitar riffs, and frantic double bass drumming. Only with the release of their second LP, Persecution Mania, and with guitarist Frank Blackfire's input to move away from their original sound and themes, did they become a thrash metal band for good. Essen's Kreator formed and released its debut album, Endless Pain, in 1985. Destruction would release their full-length debut, Infernal Overkill, in the same year. Exumer would also release their demo, A Mortal in Black, in 1985, and their debut, Possessed by Fire, the following year. Also around this time, the German-based SPV Records created its Steamhammer imprint label, designed primarily to sign metal bands. Noise Records was founded soon afterward. These two labels would help spread the Teutonic thrash metal scene globally.

Teutonic thrash metal would emerge not only from Germany but also from Austria, the Czech Republic, and Switzerland. The biggest band to come from outside Germany that was part of the scene was Coroner, a highly technical and progressive thrash metal band from Switzerland, noted for their dark lyrics and accomplished guitar work by Tommy Vetterli, who would later join Kreator.

Many bands soon split up or changed their sound, resulting in further backlash against the scene. Kreator moved toward a more melodic style with gothic and industrial influences, while Sodom experimented with a death/thrash style for one album before briefly shifting to a more hardcore punk-influenced sound. Destruction, meanwhile, faced a period of instability that saw them split with frontman Schmier, release a thrash album without him (Cracked Brain), and later attempt a more radio-friendly and less "thrashy" style with the poorly received The Least Successful Human Cannonball. Schmier would go on to form Headhunter, achieving some success with a series of three power-thrash albums similar in sound to some of the offerings of Rage.
