= Genesis XIX =

Studio album by Sodom
- Released: 27 November 2020
- Recorded: 2020
- Studio: Woodhouse Studio, Hagen, Germany
- Genre: Thrash metal
- Length: 54:49
- Label: Steamhammer
- Producer: Sodom

Sodom chronology
| Decision Day (2016) | Genesis XIX (2020) | The Arsonist (2025) |

Professional ratings
Review scores
| Source | Rating |
|---|---|
| Metal Hammer | 3/5 stars |

Genesis XIX is the sixteenth studio album by the German thrash metal band Sodom, released on 27 November 2020. It is the first studio album to feature returning guitarist Frank Blackfire since 1989's Agent Orange, as well as new members, guitarist Yorck Segatz and drummer Toni Merkel. As such, this album marks the first time in Sodom's history that they had recorded an album as a quartet rather than a trio.

Genesis XIX was produced by the band themselves, and like the previous album Decision Day (2016), its artwork was designed by Joe Petagno.

== Track listing ==
Genesis XIX track listing
| No. | Title | Length |
|---|---|---|
| 1. | "Blind Superstition" | 1:02 |
| 2. | "Sodom & Gomorrah" | 4:06 |
| 3. | "Euthanasia" | 3:54 |
| 4. | "Genesis XIX" | 7:09 |
| 5. | "Nicht mehr mein Land" | 4:29 |
| 6. | "Glock 'n' Roll" | 5:02 |
| 7. | "The Harpooneer" | 7:10 |
| 8. | "Dehumanized" | 3:53 |
| 9. | "Occult Perpetrator" | 4:53 |
| 10. | "Waldo & Pigpen" | 6:25 |
| 11. | "Indoctrination" | 3:10 |
| 12. | "Friendly Fire" | 3:36 |
| Total length: | | 54:49 |

== Personnel ==
=== Sodom ===
- Tom Angelripper – bass, vocals
- Frank Blackfire – lead guitar
- Yorck Segatz – rhythm guitar
- Toni Merkel – drums

=== Production ===
- Sodom – production
- Siggi Bemm – engineer, mixing
- Joe Petagno – album cover

== Charts ==
| Chart (2020) | Peak position |
|---|---|
| German Albums (Offizielle Top 100) | 10 |
