= Expurse of Sodomy =

EP by Sodom
- Released: 1 October 1987
- Recorded: Musiclab in Berlin, Germany, December 1986
- Genre: Thrash metal
- Length: 14:50
- Label: Steamhammer/SPV
- Producer: Harris Johns

Sodom chronology
Obsessed by Cruelty (1986)	Expurse of Sodomy (1987)	Persecution Mania (1987)

Expurse of Sodomy is an EP released by German thrash metal band Sodom. Some copies were released on picture disc and limited edition in clear vinyl. The song "Sodomy & Lust" has been covered by Cradle of Filth, Exhumed, and Epilepsia.

== Track listing ==
No.	Title	Length
1.	"Sodomy & Lust"	5:10
2.	"The Conqueror"	3:38
3.	"My Atonement"	6:02
Total length:		14:50

== Personnel ==
- Tom Angelripper – bass, vocals
- Frank Blackfire – guitar
- Chris Witchhunter– drums
