= In the Sign of Evil =

EP by Sodom
- Released: January 1985
- Recorded: October 1984
- Studio: Caet Studio, Berlin
- Genre: Black metal; speed metal
- Length: 19:12
- Label: Devil's Game
- Producer: Wolfgang Eichholz

Sodom chronology
In the Sign of Evil (1985)	Obsessed by Cruelty (1986)

Professional ratings
Review scores
Source	Rating
Kerrang!	4/5 stars

In the Sign of Evil is the first EP and the debut release by German thrash metal band Sodom, released in 1985 by Devil's Game independent label. The record is considered part of the first wave of black metal.

The tracks from In the Sign of Evil were re-recorded in 2007 and released as The Final Sign of Evil.

== Release ==
The EP is widely available as the bonus tracks in the CD version of their debut album Obsessed by Cruelty (1986). Tracks from this EP have appeared on all three live Sodom albums: Mortal Way of Live (1988), Marooned - Live (1994) and One Night in Bangkok (2003).

== Track listing ==
All lyrics are written by Tom Angelripper, except "Witching Metal", by Aggressor.

No.	Title	Length
1.	"Outbreak of Evil"	4:49
2.	"Sepulchral Voice"	4:31
3.	"Blasphemer"	3:05
4.	"Witching Metal"	3:13
5.	"Burst Command ‘til War"	3:36
Total length:		19:12

== Personnel ==
=== Sodom ===
- Tom Angelripper – vocals, bass
- Grave Violator (Josef "Peppi" Dominik) – guitar
- Witchhunter (Christian Dudek) – drums

=== Production ===
- Detleft Schmidt – sleeve design
- Horst Müller – engineering
- Sven Clasen – band management
- Joachim Pieczulski – album cover painting
- Wolfgang Eicholz – production
