= Lords of Depravity Part I =

Lords of Depravity, Pt. 1

Video by Sodom
- Released: 18 November 2005
- Recorded: 4 August 2001 – 21 March 2004
- Genre: Speed metal, thrash metal
- Length: 315:00
- Label: Steamhammer
- Director: Bernhard Baran

Sodom chronology
Live in der Zeche Carl (1994)	Lords of Depravity, Pt. 1 (2005)

Professional ratings
Review scores
Source	Rating
Decibel	(mixed)
Exclaim!	(mixed)

Lords of Depravity Part I is a DVD by German thrash metal band Sodom.

== Track listing ==
=== DVD 1 ===
It tells the band's history from 1982 up until 1995, and includes backstage and behind-the-scenes footage as well as rare photos and interviews with current and former members of the band.

=== Disc 2: Live Depravity ===
1. "Intro"
2. "Among the Weirdcong"
3. "Vice of Killing"
4. "Outbreak of Evil"
5. "Masquerade in Blood"
6. "On Tour Worldwide"
7. "The Saw Is the Law"
8. "Remember the Fallen"
9. "Die Stumme Ursel"
10. "M-16"
11. "Press Worldwide"
12. "Napalm in the Morning"
13. "Nuclear Winter"
14. "Tombstone"
15. "Sodomized"
16. "Eat Me"
17. "Sodom Worldwide"
18. "Intro – Code Red"
19. "Aber bitte mit Sahne"
20. "Wachturm"
21. "Agent Orange"
22. "Fans Worldwide"
23. "Sodomy and Lust"
24. "Witching Metal"
25. "Backstage"
26. "Ausgebombt"
27. "Ace of Spades" (Motörhead cover)
28. "Backstage"
29. "Stalinorgel"
30. "Bombenhagel"
31. "Outro"
