= Better Off Dead (album) =

Studio album by Sodom
- Released: 1 October 1990
- Genre: Thrash metal
- Length: 49:12
- Label: Steamhammer/SPV
- Producer: Harris Johns

Sodom chronology
Agent Orange (1989)	Better Off Dead (1990)	Tapping the Vein (1992)

Professional ratings
Review scores
Source	Rating
AllMusic	link
Rock Hard	9/10 link

Better Off Dead is the fourth studio album by German thrash metal band Sodom, released on 1 October 1990 by Steamhammer/SPV. The song "The Saw Is the Law" in an altered version that was released on the EP The Saw Is the Law.

== Track listing ==
All music is composed by Chris Witchhunter, Michael Hoffmann and Tom Angelripper, except where noted.

No.	Title	Length
1.	"An Eye for an Eye"	4:25
2.	"Shellfire Defense"	4:23
3.	"The Saw Is the Law"	4:11
4.	"Turn Your Head Around" (Tank cover)	3:23
5.	"Capture the Flag"	6:08
6.	"Cold Sweat" (Thin Lizzy cover)	3:10
7.	"Bloodtrails"	4:45
8.	"Never Healing Wound"	2:26
9.	"Better Off Dead"	3:44
10.	"Resurrection"	4:50
11.	"Tarred and Feathered"	3:02
12.	"Stalinorgel"	4:41
Total length:		49:12

== Trivia ==
- "Resurrection" is dedicated to Tom Angelripper's late father
- The spoken passages at the beginning of "An Eye for an Eye" is taken from the 1989 film The Punisher.

== Personnel ==
Sodom

- Tom Angelripper - vocals, bass
- Michael Hoffmann - guitars
- Chris Witchhunter - drums

Production

- Andreas Marschall - cover art
- Harris Johns - production, mixing
