= Get What You Deserve =

Studio album by Sodom
- Released: 10 January 1994
- Recorded: 1993
- Studio: T&T Studio, Gelsenkirchen, Germany
- Genre: Thrash metal; crossover thrash
- Length: 44:15
- Label: Steamhammer/SPV

Sodom chronology
| Aber bitte mit Sahne (1993) | Get What You Deserve (1994) | Marooned Live (1994) |

Reissue cover

Professional ratings
Review scores
| Source | Rating |
|---|---|
| AllMusic | 1.5/5 stars |

Get What You Deserve is the sixth studio album by German thrash metal band Sodom, released on 10 January 1994 via Steamhammer/SPV. This was the band's last album to feature guitarist Andy Brings, and their first release with drummer Guido "Atomic Steif" Richter as the replacement of founding member Christian "Witchhunter" Dudek. Get What You Deserve finds Sodom continuing their experimentation, although it bypasses the death metal sound of its predecessor Tapping the Vein in favor of a more crossover influenced approach, while still retaining their thrash metal sound.

== Track listing ==
All tracks written by Tom Angelripper, except where noted.

| No. | Title | Writer(s) | Length |
|---|---|---|---|
| 1. | "Get What You Deserve" | | 3:44 |
| 2. | "Jabba the Hut" | | 2:29 |
| 3. | "Jesus Screamer" | Andy Brings | 1:42 |
| 4. | "Delight in Slaying" | | 2:40 |
| 5. | "Die Stumme Ursel" | | 3:47 |
| 6. | "Freaks of Nature" | | 2:07 |
| 7. | "Eat Me" | Brings | 3:22 |
| 8. | "Unbury the Hatchet" | | 2:28 |
| 9. | "Into Perdition" | | 2:45 |
| 10. | "Sodomized" | | 2:43 |
| 11. | "Fellows in Misery" | | 2:18 |
| 12. | "Tribute to Moby Dick" (Instrumental) | Angelripper, Atomic Steif, Brings | 4:21 |
| 13. | "Silence Is Consent" | | 2:30 |
| 14. | "Erwachet" | Brings | 2:17 |
| 15. | "Gomorrah" | | 2:19 |
| 16. | "Angel Dust" (Venom cover) | Conrad Lant, Jeffrey Dunn, Tony Bray | 2:39 |
| Total length: | | | 44:15 |

== Personnel ==
- Tom Angelripper – vocals, bass
- Andy Brings – guitars
- Atomic Steif – drums

== Charts ==
| Chart (1994) | Peak position |
|---|---|
| German Albums (Offizielle Top 100) | 45 |

| Chart (2026) | Peak position |
|---|---|
| Austrian Albums (Ö3 Austria) | 8 |
| Belgian Albums (Ultratop Flanders) | 159 |
| German Albums (Offizielle Top 100) | 5 |
| German Rock & Metal Albums (Offizielle Top 100) | 2 |
| Greek Albums (IFPI) | 73 |
| Swiss Albums (Schweizer Hitparade) | 32 |
| UK Rock & Metal Albums (OCC) | 25 |
