= Masquerade in Blood =

Studio album by Sodom
- Released: 1 June 1995
- Recorded: January–February 1995
- Genre: Thrash metal; crossover thrash; groove metal; death metal
- Length: 42:34; 46:21 (Japanese edition)
- Label: Steamhammer
- Producer: Uli Pösselt

Sodom chronology
Marooned Live (1994)	Masquerade in Blood (1995)	Ten Black Years (1996)

Masquerade in Blood is the seventh studio album by German thrash metal band Sodom, released on 1 June 1995 via Steamhammer/SPV. Musically, Masquerade is often seen as the band's rawest and heaviest record, and continues in the same vein as that of their previous album, but in a more post-thrash fashion.

== Overview ==
The album includes a cover of Anti-Nowhere League song "Let's Break the Law", as well as a cover of Saxon song "20,000 Feet". The latter is only found on the Japanese releases of the album. This is also the only release to feature guitarist Strahli, and the second and last for drummer Atomic Steif, since the former was arrested in 1996 for possession of drugs, while the latter left the band for personal reasons.

Masquerade in Blood continues in the same crossover thrash vein as their previous studio effort Get What You Deserve (which was released in the previous year), however it is most notable for introducing a new groove metal style, with "overwhelming" death metal being present on select songs.

== Reception ==
Professional ratings
Review scores
Source	Rating
AllMusic	2/5 stars

AllMusic's Eduardo Rivadavia gave the album two stars out of five, noting it as being "something of a return to form" for the band. However, he actually remarked that "such enthusiasm was rather exaggerated", and also criticized it as "a dire listening experience".

== Track listing ==
All lyrics are written by Tom Angelripper; all music is composed by Angelripper, Atomic Steif and Strahli, except where noted.

No.	Title	Music	Length
1.	"Masquerade in Blood"		3:19
2.	"Gathering of Minds"		4:16
3.	"Fields of Honour"		3:23
4.	"Braindead"		2:29
5.	"Verrecke!" (German lyrics)		2:48
6.	"Shadow of Damnation"		2:57
7.	"Peacemaker's Law"		3:23
8.	"Murder in My Eyes"		2:38
9.	"Unwanted Youth"		3:32
10.	"Mantelmann" (Lyrics in German)		2:10
11.	"Scum"		5:24
12.	"Hydrophobia"		3:23
13.	"Let's Break the Law" (Anti-Nowhere League cover)	Nick Culmer, Chris Exall	2:55
Total length:			42:34

Japanese edition bonus track
No.	Title	Writer(s)	Length
14.	"20,000 Feet" (Originally performed by Saxon)	Biff Byford, Paul Quinn, Graham Oliver, Steve Dawson, Pete Gill	3:39
Total length:			46:21

== Personnel ==
Sodom

- Tom Angelripper – vocals, bass guitar
- Strahli – rhythm and lead guitar
- Atomic Steif – drums

Additional personnel

- Uli Pösselt – production

== Charts ==
Chart (1995)	Peak position
German Album Charts	76
