= Mortal Way of Live =

Live album by Sodom
- Released: 1 October 1988
- Recorded: Sodomania tour in April and May of 1988
- Genre: Thrash metal
- Length: 72:06
- Label: Steamhammer/SPV

Sodom chronology
Persecution Mania (1987)	Mortal Way of Live (1988)	Agent Orange (1989)

Professional ratings
Review scores
Source	Rating
AllMusic	link

Mortal Way of Live is a live album by German thrash metal band Sodom, released in 1988. The original cover was censored for the CD release of the record, it was replaced with an all black cover with a white circle in the center containing the band's logo and name of the record, with the original cover appearing on the back of the booklet.

== Track listing ==
No.	Title	Length
1.	"Persecution Mania"	4:45
2.	"Outbreak of Evil"	3:46
3.	"Conqueror"	3:00
4.	"Iron Fist" (Motörhead cover)	2:56
5.	"Obsessed by Cruelty"	8:54
6.	"Nuclear Winter"	5:54
7.	"Electrocution"	3:06
8.	"Blasphemer"	6:00
9.	"Enchanted Land"	4:15
10.	"Sodomy & Lust"	5:02
11.	"Christ Passion"	6:24
12.	"Bombenhagel"	6:40
13.	"My Atonement"	5:57
14.	"Conjuration"	5:26
Total length:		72:06

== Personnel ==
- Tom Angelripper - vocals, bass
- Frank Blackfire - guitars
- Chris Witchhunter - drums
