= 'Til Death Do Us Unite =

Studio album by Sodom
- Released: 24 February 1997
- Recorded: October–November 1996
- Studio: RA.SH Studios
- Genre: Thrash metal; crossover thrash
- Length: 49:28
- Label: Steamhammer/SPV
- Producer: Harris Johns

Sodom chronology
Ten Black Years (1996)	'Til Death Do Us Unite (1997)	Code Red (1999)

'Til Death Do Us Unite is the eighth studio album by German thrash metal band Sodom. It was released on 24 February 1997 by Steamhammer/SPV. It is the first Sodom album with guitarist Bernermann and drummer Bobby Schottkowski.

A video was made for the song "Fuck the Police".

== Track listing ==
All tracks are written by Tom Angelripper, except where noted.

No.	Title	Length
1.	"Frozen Screams"	2:56
2.	"Fuck the Police"	3:27
3.	"Gisela"	2:39
4.	"That's What an Unknown Killer Diarized"	4:42
5.	"Hanging Judge"	2:46
6.	"No Way Out"	2:47
7.	"Polytoximaniac"	2:27
8.	"'Til Death Do Us Unite"	5:12
9.	"Hazy Shade of Winter" (Simon & Garfunkel cover)	1:59
10.	"Suicidal Justice"	2:47
11.	"Wander in the Valley"	3:51
12.	"Sow the Seeds of Discord"	2:30
13.	"Master of Disguise"	3:03
14.	"Schwerter Zu Pflugscharen"	4:01
15.	"Hey, Hey, Hey Rock'n Roll Star"	4:18
Total length:		49:28

== Personnel ==
Sodom

- Tom Angelripper – vocals, bass
- Bernd "Bernemann" Kost – guitars
- Bobby Schottkowski – drums

Additional musician

- Alex Kraft – guitar solo on "Hey, Hey, Hey Rock 'N' Roll Star"

Production

- Harris Johns – producer
- Kai Blankenberg – remixing
