= Sacred Warpath =

EP by Sodom
- Released: 28 November 2014 (Europe); 20 January 2015 (US)
- Genre: Thrash metal
- Length: 19:03
- Label: SPV
- Producer: Cornelius Rambadt

Sodom chronology
| Epitome of Torture (2013) | Sacred Warpath (2014) | Decision Day (2016) |

Professional ratings
Review scores
| Source | Rating |
|---|---|
| Blabbermouth.net | 8/10 |
| Revolver | 3.5/5 stars |

Sacred Warpath is an EP by German thrash metal band Sodom, released in 2014. It contains one original studio track and live versions of three previously released songs. "Sacred Warpath" was re-recorded two years later on the band's fifteenth studio album, Decision Day (2016).

== Production and release ==
Sacred Warpath was released in CD and digital formats on 28 November 2014 in Germany, 1 December in Europe, and 20 January 2015 in North America. However, due to a small error, the release of a 10" vinyl version was delayed until 19 December in Germany and 22 December in Europe.

== Track listing ==
| No. | Title | Length |
|---|---|---|
| 1. | "Sacred Warpath" | 5:45 |
| 2. | "The Saw Is the Law" (live) | 4:55 |
| 3. | "City of God" (live) | 2:48 |
| 4. | "Stigmatized" (live) | 5:35 |
| Total length: | | 19:03 |

== Credits ==
- Tom Angelripper - vocals, bass
- Bernd "Bernemann" Kost - lead and rhythm guitar
- Markus "Makka" Freiwald - drums
- Cornelius Rambadt - production
