= Aber bitte mit Sahne =

EP by Sodom
- Released: 1993
- Genre: Thrash metal
- Length: 10:11
- Label: SPV/Steamhammer
- Producer: Sodom and Wolf G. Stach

Sodom chronology
Tapping the Vein (1992)	Aber bitte mit Sahne (1993)	Get What You Deserve (1994)

Aber bitte mit Sahne is an EP by the German thrash metal band Sodom. The title track is a cover of the 1975 song of the same name by Austrian singer Udo Jürgens. Its title translates into English as "But with whipped cream, please".

== Track listing ==
No.	Title	Music	Length
1.	"Aber bitte mit Sahne"	Udo Jürgens / Eckart Hachfeld / Wolfgang Spahr	3:17
2.	"Sodomized"	Sodom / Tom Angelripper	2:39
3.	"Abuse"	Sodom / Tom Angelripper	1:43
4.	"Skinned Alive '93"	Dudek, Brings, Such	2:30
Total length:			10:11

== Personnel ==
- Tom Angelripper – vocals, bass
- Andy Brings – guitars
- Atomic Steif – drums
