= One Night in Bangkok (album) =

Live album by Sodom
- Released: 12 August 2003
- Genre: Thrash metal
- Length: 49:52 / 49:17
- Label: Steamhammer

Sodom chronology
M 16 (2001)	One Night in Bangkok (2003)	Sodom (2006)

One Night in Bangkok is a live album by German thrash metal band Sodom, recorded in Bangkok, Thailand.

== Track listing ==
=== Disc one ===
1. "Among the Weirdcong" – 5:03
2. "The Vice of Killing" – 4:22
3. "Der Wachturm" – 3:04
4. "The Saw Is the Law" – 3:36
5. "Blasphemer" – 2:46
6. "Sodomized" – 2:56
7. "Remember the Fallen" – 4:17
8. "I Am the War" – 4:12
9. "Eat Me!" – 2:54
10. "Masquerade in Blood" – 2:53
11. "M-16" – 4:31
12. "Agent Orange" – 5:43
13. "Outbreak of Evil" – 3:34

=== Disc two ===
1. "Sodomy & Lust" – 5:34
2. "Napalm in the Morning" – 6:18
3. "Fuck the Police" – 3:21
4. "Tombstone" – 4:10
5. "Witching Metal" – 2:51
6. "The Enemy Inside" – 4:36
7. "Die stumme Ursel" – 2:52
8. "Ausgebombt" – 4:38
9. "Code Red" – 4:09
10. "Ace of Spades" (Motörhead cover) – 2:46
11. "Stalinhagel" – 8:00

"Stalinhagel" is a combination of the tracks "Bombenhagel" and "Stalinorgel".
"The Enemy Inside" is a then-new track, later recorded for the band's next album a few years later.

== Credits ==
- Tom Angelripper - bass, vocals
- Bernemann - guitars
- Bobby Schottkowski - drums
