= Agent Orange (album) =

Studio album by Sodom
- Released: 1 June 1989
- Recorded: March–April 1989
- Studios: Musiclab Studios, West Berlin
- Genre: Thrash metal
- Length: 40:14
- Label: SPV/Steamhammer
- Producer: Harris Johns

Sodom chronology
Mortal Way of Live (1988)	Agent Orange (1989)	Better Off Dead (1990)

Agent Orange is the third studio album by German thrash metal band Sodom, released on 1 June 1989 by SPV/Steamhammer. It was their last album with guitarist Frank Blackfire (who would join Kreator) until his return in 2018. The lyrical content delves into the Vietnam War, with a song dedicated to the ground assault aircraft AC-47 as well as the Agent Orange defoliant-inspired title-track. It was their first album to enter the German album charts, where it reached number 36. Agent Orange sold 100,000 copies in Germany alone and marked the band's commercial breakthrough. The song "Ausgebombt" was released on the EP Ausgebombt with German lyrics.

In March 2010, Agent Orange was re-released in a digipak with bonus tracks and liner notes containing lyrics and rare photos.

It is considered to be an essential release in the genre by Revolver.

== Music ==
The musical style on Agent Orange has been characterized as "stand[ing] right at the devil's crossroads of thrash and death metal." The album's production is considered to be "fuller [and] heavier" than that of its predecessor, Persecution Mania. Screen Rant said: "Each track on Agent Orange flows with equal parts punk, and military bombast, all joining forces to create a cohesive whole that rocks from start-to-finish, without a single bum note in between." The influence of hardcore punk band Discharge has been observed on the album.

The album's lyrics explore themes pertaining to the Vietnam War.

== Artwork ==
Matthew Thomas of Screen Rant said that the album's cover artwork "screams a classic - like Doom Guy and a baddie from Half-Life 2 have joined forces to blow up planet earth."

The album's liner notes carry the message: "This album is dedicated to all people – soldiers and civilians – who died by senseless aggressions of wars all over the world."

== Critical reception ==
Professional ratings
Review scores
Source	Rating
AllMusic	4.5/5 stars
Rock Hard	9/10

In 2005, Agent Orange was ranked number 299 in Rock Hard magazine's book of The 500 Greatest Rock & Metal Albums of All Time. In 2017, Rolling Stone ranked Agent Orange as 63rd on their list of 'The 100 Greatest Metal Albums of All Time'.

Thom Jurek of AllMusic said Agent Orange was an improvement over Persecution Mania, and argued that it was the band's definitive album. He wrote: "The songwriting is tighter, the dynamics more elaborate, and everyone carries equal weight -- it would be the very last time this would happen with Sodom on record." He named "Exhibition Bout," "Incest" and "Baptism of Fire" as the album's strongest tracks.

In 2025, Matthew Thomas of Screen Rant said the album was "perhaps one of the most economical, stripped down thrash recordings of its time."

== Track listing ==
All music is composed by Chris Witchhunter, Frank Blackfire and Tom Angelripper, except where noted.

No.	Title	Length
1.	"Agent Orange"	6:04
2.	"Tired and Red"	5:25
3.	"Incest"	4:38
4.	"Remember the Fallen"	4:20
5.	"Magic Dragon"	5:59
6.	"Exhibition Bout"	3:35
7.	"Ausgebombt"	3:04
8.	"Baptism of Fire"	4:03
9.	"Don't Walk Away" (Tank cover)	2:56
Total length:		40:14

Re-release bonus disc
No.	Title	Length
1.	"Incest" (live)	4:18
2.	"Agent Orange" (live)	5:26
3.	"Tired and Red" (live)	5:01
4.	"Remember the Fallen" (live)	4:05
5.	"Ausgebombt" (live)	3:47
6.	"Ausgebombt" (German version)	3:06

Track 9 is a bonus track for initial CD pressings.

== Personnel ==
Sodom

- Tom Angelripper – vocals, bass
- Frank Blackfire – guitars
- Chris Witchhunter – drums

Production

- Harris Johns – production, engineering, mixing
- Andreas Marschall – cover art
- Manfred Eisenblätter – photography

== Ausgebombt EP ==
The band released two songs from Agent Orange on its third EP, Ausgebombt.

=== Track listing ===
No.	Title	Length
1.	"Ausgebombt" (German Version)	3:07
2.	"Don't Walk Away" (Tank cover)	3:00
3.	"Incest" (Live)	4:28
Total length:		10:35

== Charts ==
Chart (1989)	Peak position
German Album Charts	36

== See also ==
- List of anti-war songs
