= Epitome of Torture =

Studio album by Sodom
- Released: 26 April 2013 (Germany); 7 May 2013 (US)
- Recorded: Waldstreet, Germany, October–December, 2012
- Genre: Thrash metal
- Length: 39:54; 49:28 (with bonus tracks)
- Label: SPV

Sodom chronology
In War and Pieces (2010)	Epitome of Torture (2013)	Sacred Warpath (2014)

Professional ratings
Review scores
Source	Rating
Blabbermouth.net	8.5/10
MetalSucks	3.5/5 stars
Metal Hammer	5/7

Epitome of Torture is the fourteenth album by German thrash metal band Sodom. The album debuted on the Billboard Heatseakers Chart at 25, their highest Billboard debut ever.

The song "Katjuscha" contains a melody from the song "Katyusha", a World War II Soviet Russian folk song originally composed by Matvei Blanter in 1938. A music video was made for the song "Stigmatized."

== Track listing ==
All tracks are written by Tom Angelripper, except where noted.

No.	Title	Writers	Length
1.	"My Final Bullet"		4:39
2.	"S.O.D.O.M."		3:46
3.	"Epitome of Torture"		3:31
4.	"Stigmatized"		2:56
5.	"Cannibal"		4:19
6.	"Shoot Today - Kill Tomorrow"		4:00
7.	"Invocating the Demons"		4:25
8.	"Katjuscha"		3:42
9.	"Into the Skies of War"		3:50
10.	"Tracing the Victim"	Angelripper, Nadja Herten	4:46
Total length:			39:54

Digipak bonus tracks
No.	Title	Length
11.	"Waterboarding"	5:06
12.	"Splitting the Atom"	4:28
Total length:		49:28

== Credits ==
- Tom Angelripper – vocals, bass
- Bernd "Bernemann" Kost – lead and rhythm guitar
- Markus "Makka" Freiwald – drums

== Charts ==
Chart (2013)	Peak position
German Albums (Offizielle Top 100)	32
Swiss Albums (Schweizer Hitparade)	87
US Heatseekers Albums (Billboard)	25
