= In War and Pieces =

Studio album by Sodom
- Released: 19 November 2010
- Recorded: Waldstreet, Germany, August 2010
- Genre: Thrash metal
- Length: 50:35
- Label: Steamhammer/SPV
- Producer: Waldemar Sorychta

Sodom chronology
The Final Sign of Evil (2007)	In War and Pieces (2010)	Epitome of Torture (2013)

Professional ratings
Review scores
Source	Rating
AllMusic	4/5 stars
BW&BK	7.5/10
Sputnikmusic	4.5/5 stars

In War and Pieces is the thirteenth album by the German thrash metal band Sodom. It was released on 19 November 2010 in Germany, 22 November 2010 in Europe, and 11 January 2011 in the United States.

The album was released in four formats:

- Limited edition digipak with bonus live CD including 10 tracks (Wacken, 25th anniversary show 2007)
- Double gatefold LP in blood red vinyl with 1 bonus track ("Murder One")
- Standard version
- Download

In War and Pieces sold over 700 copies in the United States in its first week.

== Track listing ==
All lyrics are written by Nadja Herten and Tom Angelripper; all music is composed by Angelripper, Bernemann and Schottkowski.

No.	Title	Length
1.	"In War and Pieces"	4:11
2.	"Hellfire"	3:07
3.	"Through Toxic Veins"	4:43
4.	"Nothing Counts More than Blood"	3:49
5.	"Storm Raging Up"	5:08
6.	"Feigned Death Throes"	3:59
7.	"Soul Contraband"	3:50
8.	"God Bless You"	5:10
9.	"The Art of Killing Poetry"	4:38
10.	"Knarrenheinz"	3:20
11.	"Styptic Parasite"	5:13
Total length:		50:35

Japanese edition bonus track
No.	Title	Length
12.	"Murder One"	3:27

== Personnel ==
Sodom

- Tom Angelripper – bass guitar, vocals
- Bernd "Bernemann" Kost – guitars
- Bobby Schottkowski – drums

Production

- Waldemar Sorychta – producer, engineering, mixing, mastering
- Dennis Koehne – engineering, mixing, mastering
- Eliran Kantor – artwork
- Olli Eppmann – photography

== Charts ==
Chart (2010)	Peak position
German Albums (Offizielle Top 100)	64
