= Michael Wulf =

German guitarist (1963–1993)

- Also known as: Destructor
- Born: 6 December 1963; Germany
- Died: 21 July 1993 (aged 29)
- Genres: Thrash metal
- Occupation: Guitarist
- Years active: 1985–1986
- Formerly of: Kreator, Sodom

Michael Wulf (6 December 1963 – 21 July 1993), also known by the stage name Destructor, was a German guitarist who was a member of the thrash metal bands Kreator and Sodom. He was a member of Kreator in 1986, after leaving Sodom earlier that year, but shortly after parted ways with them too. He played guitar on Sodom's 1986 debut album Obsessed by Cruelty and left the band shortly after. Wulf was killed in a motorcycle accident on 21 July 1993 at the age of 29.

== Discography ==
- Obsessed by Cruelty (1986)
