= Sodom (album) =

Studio album by Sodom
- Released: 21 April 2006
- Genre: Thrash metal
- Length: 43:08
- Label: Steamhammer
- Producer: Andy Brings

Sodom chronology
One Night in Bangkok (2003)	Sodom (2006)	The Final Sign of Evil (2007)

Alternative covers

Sodom is the eleventh album by German thrash metal band Sodom, released on 21 April 2006. The first pressing was in a slipcase and includes a full-colour poster of the artwork. "The album is self-titled," Tom Angelripper explains, "because every band needs a self-titled album."

Professional ratings
Review scores
Source	Rating
AllMusic	3/5 stars
Metal Storm	8.7/10

== Track listing ==
All lyrics are written by Tom Angelripper; all music is composed by Sodom.

No.	Title	Length
1.	"Blood on Your Lips"	4:43
2.	"Wanted Dead"	3:58
3.	"Buried in the Justice Ground"	3:09
4.	"City of God"	4:36
5.	"Bibles and Guns"	3:32
6.	"Axis of Evil"	4:36
7.	"Lords of Depravity"	2:48
8.	"No Captures"	4:47
9.	"Lay Down the Law"	3:57
10.	"Nothing to Regret"	2:54
11.	"The Enemy Inside"	4:06
Total length:		43:08

Japanese edition Bonus track
No.	Title	Length
12.	"Kamikaze Terrorizer"	3:44
Total length:		46:52

== Personnel ==
- Tom Angelripper – vocals, bass guitar
- Bernd "Bernemann" Kost – guitars
- Bobby Schottkowski – drums

== Charts ==
Chart (2006)	Peak position
German Albums Chart	64
