= The Final Sign of Evil =

Studio album of re-recorded songs by Sodom
- Released: 28 September 2007
- Genre: Thrash metal; black metal
- Length: 49:43
- Label: Steamhammer

Sodom chronology
Sodom (2006)	The Final Sign of Evil (2007)	In War and Pieces (2010)

The Final Sign of Evil is the twelfth studio album by German thrash metal band Sodom, released in 2007. The album includes re-recorded songs from In the Sign of Evil as well as seven songs originally written for it, but not recorded due to the label's inability to pay for studio time. As a result, In the Sign of Evil was released as an EP with the original versions of the tracks rather than a full-length album.

Professional ratings
Review scores
Source	Rating
AllMusic	link
About.com	link
Sea of Tranquility	link

== Track listing ==
All music is composed by Chris Witchhunter, Grave Violator and Tom Angelripper

No.	Title	Length
1.	"The Sin of Sodom"	5:41
2.	"Blasphemer"	3:20
3.	"Bloody Corpse"	3:56
4.	"Witching Metal"	3:38
5.	"Sons of Hell"	4:22
6.	"Burst Command 'til War"	2:29
7.	"Where Angels Die"	4:47
8.	"Sepulchral Voice"	4:36
9.	"Hatred of the Gods"	3:14
10.	"Ashes to Ashes"	4:22
11.	"Outbreak of Evil"	5:26
12.	"Defloration"	3:52
Total length:		49:43

== Personnel ==
- Tom Angelripper – vocals, bass
- Grave Violator – guitar
- Chris Witchhunter – drums
