= M-16 (album) =

Studio album by Sodom
- Released: 22 October 2001
- Recorded: Spiderhouse Studios, July–August, 2001
- Genre: Thrash metal
- Length: 49:02
- Label: Steamhammer
- Producer: Harris Johns

Sodom chronology
Code Red (1999)	M-16 (2001)	One Night in Bangkok (2003)

Alternative Cover
- Digipak Cover

Professional ratings
Review scores
Source	Rating
Rock Hard	8.5/10
BW&BK	8/10

M-16 is the tenth studio album by German thrash metal band Sodom, released on 22 October 2001 by Steamhammer Records. The album is a concept album about the Vietnam War and is named after the rifle used by many U.S. soldiers during the war.

== Track listing ==
All tracks are written by Tom Angelripper, except where noted.

No.	Title	Length
1.	"Among the Weirdcong"	5:07
2.	"I Am the War"	4:06
3.	"Napalm in the Morning"	5:56
4.	"Minejumper"	3:11
5.	"Genocide"	4:49
6.	"Little Boy"	4:08
7.	"M-16"	4:49
8.	"Lead Injection"	6:24
9.	"Cannon Fodder"	3:53
10.	"Marines"	3:55
11.	"Surfin' Bird" (The Trashmen cover)	2:39
Total length:		49:02

Digipak edition bonus tracks
No.	Title	Length
12.	"Witching Metal"	3:10
13.	"Devil's Attack"	3:12
Total length:		55:24

The digipak edition contains two tracks taken from the 1982 Witching Metal demo recording.

The intro sample in "Napalm in the Morning" is taken from the film Apocalypse Now. The sample in "Marines" is taken from Full Metal Jacket as is the inspiration to record a cover of "Surfin' Bird" which also appeared in the film.

== Personnel ==
Sodom

- Tom Angelripper – bass, vocals
- Bernd "Bernemann" Kost – guitars
- Bobby Schottkowski – drums

Production

- Axel Hermann – cover art
- Harris Johns – co-producer, mixing, recording
- Manfred Eisenblatter – photography

== Charts ==
Chart performance for M-16
Chart (2001)	Peak position
German Albums (Offizielle Top 100)	88

Chart (2021)	Peak position
German Albums (Offizielle Top 100)	27
Swiss Albums (Schweizer Hitparade)	78
