= Persecution Mania =

Studio album by Sodom
- Released: 1 December 1987
- Recorded: 2–22 October 1987
- Studio: Musiclab Studios, Berlin
- Genre: Thrash metal
- Length: 34:39
- Label: Steamhammer/SPV
- Producer: Sodom; Harris Johns

Sodom chronology
Expurse of Sodomy (1987)	Persecution Mania (1987)	Mortal Way of Live (1988)

Professional ratings
Review scores
Source	Rating
AllMusic	4.5/5 stars
Rock Hard	8/10

Persecution Mania is the second studio album by German thrash metal band Sodom, released on 1 December 1987 by Steamhammer/SPV. The album marked a change from thrash metal, speed metal and black metal to mostly just thrash metal. It defined Sodom's sound and exemplified the thrash metal genre at a time when it arguably peaked in popularity. The album bore similarities to the music of other German bands such as Destruction and Kreator, from which the term "Teutonic" thrash was coined.

Despite what the cover may imply, the lyrical themes of the album are centred more around politics and war than religion. This is largely due to guitarist Frank "Blackfire" Gosdzik joining the band. He brought new songwriting aspects to the band that gave it a much more organized and clearer sound, as well as helping Sodom to carve a lyrical niche that it still practices to this day. The outro guitar lead in track 9, "Bombenhagel", is the German national anthem, "Das Lied der Deutschen".

Persecution Mania was re-released in 2000 as part of a double pack with the Obsessed by Cruelty/In the Sign of Evil split. Both CD releases include the Expurse of Sodomy EP.

== Track listing ==
All music is composed by Chris Witchhunter, Frank Blackfire and Tom Angelripper, except where noted.

No.	Title	Length
1.	"Nuclear Winter"	5:26
2.	"Electrocution"	3:26
3.	"Iron Fist" (Motörhead cover)	2:45
4.	"Persecution Mania"	3:40
5.	"Enchanted Land"	4:01
6.	"Procession to Golgatha"	2:01
7.	"Christ Passion"	6:13
8.	"Conjuration"	3:44
9.	"Bombenhagel"	5:11
Total length:		34:39

European CD release tracks
No.	Title	Length
10.	"Outbreak of Evil"	3:32
11.	"Sodomy & Lust"	5:14
12.	"The Conqueror"	3:29
13.	"My Atonement"	6:05

The European CD release has a rerecording of "Outbreak of Evil" and the Expurse of Sodomy EP as bonus tracks. The cassette has only the re-recorded "Outbreak of Evil" as a bonus track.

== Personnel ==
Sodom

- Tom Angelripper - vocals, bass
- Frank Blackfire - guitars
- Chris Witchhunter - drums

Additional musician

- Harris Johns - guitar solo on "Bombenhagel"

Production

- Johannes Beck - cover painting
- Harris Johns - engineering, producer
