= Code Red (Sodom album) =

Studio album by Sodom
- Released: 31 May 1999
- Recorded: Spiderhouse Studios, February 1999
- Genre: Thrash metal
- Length: 40:21
- Label: Drakkar
- Producer: Harris Johns

Sodom chronology
'Til Death Do Us Unite (1997)	Code Red (1999)	M-16 (2001)

Professional ratings
Review scores
Source	Rating
AllMusic	3/5 stars
Sputnikmusic	link

Code Red is the ninth studio album by German thrash metal band Sodom, released on 31 May 1999 via Drakkar Entertainment. On this album, Sodom returned to classic thrash metal which pleased many fans. It was also released as a two-disc limited edition with a Sodom tribute album called Homage to the Gods and as a two-disc edition with an Onkel Tom Angelripper's album called Ich glaub' nicht an den Weihnachtsmann.

== Track listing ==
All tracks are written by Tom Angelripper.

No.	Title	Length
1.	"Intro"	0:48
2.	"Code Red"	3:55
3.	"What Hell Can Create"	3:32
4.	"Tombstone"	3:55
5.	"Liquidation"	2:45
6.	"Spiritual Demise"	2:51
7.	"Warlike Conspiracy"	2:50
8.	"Cowardice"	4:17
9.	"The Vice of Killing"	4:22
10.	"Visual Buggery"	3:13
11.	"Book Burning"	2:34
12.	"The Wolf & the Lamb"	3:19
13.	"Addicted to Abstinence"	2:06
Total length:		40:21

- The intro sample is taken from the film Full Metal Jacket.

== Personnel ==
Sodom

- Tom Angelripper – vocals, bass
- Bernd "Bernemann" Kost – guitars
- Bobby Schottkowski – drums

Production

- Axel Hermann – cover art
- Harris Johns – producer, mixing, recording
