= Marooned Live =

Marooned - Live

Live album by Sodom
- Released: 1994
- Recorded: Hamburg, Germany, 10 May 1994
- Genre: Thrash metal
- Length: 77:44
- Label: Steamhammer/SPV

Sodom chronology
Get What You Deserve (1994)	Marooned - Live (1994)	Masquerade in Blood (1995)

Professional ratings
Review scores
Source	Rating
AllMusic	link

Marooned - Live is a live album by German thrash metal band Sodom, released in 1994. It was recorded in Docks, Hamburg, 10 May 1994.

== Track listing ==
1. "Intro" – 0:35
2. "Outbreak of Evil" – 2:51
3. "Jabba the Hutt" – 2:34
4. "Agent Orange" – 5:31
5. "Jesus Screamer" – 1:48
6. "Ausgebombt" – 2:51
7. "Tarred and Feathered " – 3:24
8. "Abuse" – 1:33
9. "Remember the Fallen" – 4:45
10. "An Eye for an Eye" – 4:00
11. "Tired and Red" – 5:06
12. "Eat Me!" – 2:54
13. "Die stumme Ursel" – 3:20
14. "Sodomized" – 2:47
15. "Gomorrah" – 1:56
16. "One Step over the Line" – 4:16
17. "Freaks of Nature" – 2:53
18. "Aber bitte mit Sahne" – 5:17 (Udo Jürgens cover)
19. "Silence Is Consent" – 2:52
20. "Wachturm/Erwachet" – 4:24
21. "Stalinhagel" – 7:01
22. "Fratricide" – 2:53
23. "Gone to Glory" – 1:58

== Notes ==
- Tracks 1–21 recorded live at Docks, Hamburg, 10 May 1994.
- "Fratricide" and "Gone to Glory" were recorded during the soundcheck.
- "Stalinhagel" is a combination of the songs "Stalinorgel" and "Bombenhagel".

== Credits ==
- Tom Angelripper - bass, vocals
- Andy Brings - guitars
- Atomic Steif - drums
