= Christian "Witchhunter" Dudek =

German drummer (1965–2008)

Chris Witchhunter

Background information
- Born: Christian Dudek; 18 December 1965; Gelsenkirchen, West Germany
- Died: 8 September 2008 (aged 42)
- Genres: Thrash metal; black metal; speed metal; death metal
- Occupation: Musician
- Instrument: Drums
- Years active: 1981–2008
- Formerly of: Sodom, Destruction, Bathory

Christian Dudek (18 December 1965 – 8 September 2008), also known as Chris Witchhunter, was a long-time drummer for the German thrash metal band Sodom. He was kicked out of the band in 1992 but came back in 2007 to record The Final Sign of Evil, which featured the original line-up for the first time in 22 years. In 2008, he died.

Dudek grew up in the Ruhr area. At the age of 16, he became the drummer of Sodom in 1982 and was mainly responsible for the music until his retirement. At the time, he lived with his mother, who very often accommodated and fed his bandmate and friend Tom Angelripper, but also other musicians and sometimes entire bands. Dudek is said to have had problems with alcohol as early as the 1980s. Marcel "Schmier" Schirmer, singer and bassist of Destruction, said about the 1986 tour, on which Dudek helped out as a live drummer:

"Back then, he always liked to lift one and a few times chirped a few too many beers before playing."

– Lubrication

Around 1986, Witchhunter visited Thomas "Quorthon" Forsberg in Stockholm, as he was looking for a new drummer for his band Bathory. There were some rehearsals for roughly a month, but he left the band.

Eventually, there were differences between Tom Angelripper and Dudek within the band, which led to Dudek's expulsion in 1992. According to Angelripper, this was due to Dudek's unprofessionalism due to his alcohol problem, while Dudek accused him of greed:

"Well, as I said, Tom was getting more and more money-hungry. I usually wrote the music together with the guitarist, because Tom never had time to come to the rehearsals. He then wrote some of his texts quickly in the toilet and collected 60 percent of the GEMA money for it."

– Chris Witchhunter

The separation from Sodom also meant the end of Dudek's musical career. In the following years, he tried to build up a new band in the style of Megadeth and Metallica and had already composed some new songs. However, the project failed because he could not find a singer who met his expectations. He became a father in the meantime, and tried his hand as an editor at some fanzines. His last musical sign of life was the re-recording of the 1984 Sodom EP in 2007, which was recorded and released alongside other old songs by the band on the 1984 line-up of The Final Sign of Evil. But Dudek's illness was already noticeable during the recordings, according to Angelripper. Dudek died on 7 September 2008.

A benefit concert was held in his honour on 11 April 2009 in Oberhausen, and the proceeds went to Dudek's mother, Erika Winkler, of the proceeds. Only bands that had a personal relationship with Witchhunter and have their roots in the 1980s were booked, including Artillery, Assassin and Holy Moses. The band Kreator could not participate due to a tour; after a commitment by Destruction and the completion of the poster for the concert, "Schmier objected to the size of the logo", with the demand that it be recreated according to his wishes; he told Sodom by email that "he doesn't want to be 'the opening act' with Destruction" and that the band should "look for someone else" which was followed by the cancellation of the Destruction performance. After "all ambiguities and misunderstandings were cleared up", Angelripper finally announced "the definitive commitment of Destruction".

== Discography ==
=== With Sodom ===
- In the Sign of Evil (1984)
- Obsessed by Cruelty (1986)
- Persecution Mania (1987)
- Mortal Way of Live (1988)
- Agent Orange (1989)
- Better Off Dead (1990)
- Tapping the Vein (1992)
- The Final Sign of Evil (2007)
