= Obsessed by Cruelty =

Studio album by Sodom
- Released: 7 May 1986
- Recorded: 1985
- Studios: Casablanca Studio, Berlin (U.S. version); Tonstudio Hilpoltstein, Nuremberg, West Germany (European version)
- Genres: Black metal; speed metal
- Length: 37:48 (U.S. version); 40:27 (European version)
- Labels: Metal Blade (U.S. version); SPV/Steamhammer (European version)

Sodom chronology
In the Sign of Evil (1985)	Obsessed by Cruelty (1986)	Expurse of Sodomy (1987)

Professional ratings
Review scores
Source	Rating
AllMusic	1.5/5 stars

Obsessed by Cruelty is the debut full-length studio album and second release by German thrash metal band Sodom, released in 1986. A European and an American version of the album exist, released by Steamhammer and Metal Blade Records.

== Release ==
The band had to record the album twice because the record company was not satisfied with the original result. The first version was recorded in Berlin and released on vinyl by Metal Blade Records in the United States in 1986. The second version was recorded in Nuremberg and released by Steamhammer Records in their home country in the same year. According to Tom Angelripper, the second recording is "completely different" and features a bonus track, "After the Deluge".

=== Re-releases ===
Obsessed by Cruelty was re-released together with In the Sign of Evil in 1988, containing the first recorded version, and as a picture vinyl in 2005 by Vinyl Maniacs.

== Influence ==
The album had a major influence on then-developing black metal. Mayhem founder and guitarist Euronymous described the early Sodom and Destruction releases as underrated "masterpieces of black stinking metal". He also named his record label, Deathlike Silence Productions, after the album's second track.

== Track listing ==
All music composed by Sodom (Chris Witchhunter, Michael Wulf, Tom Angelripper, Uwe Christophers).

=== U.S. version ===
Side Obsessed
No.	Title	Length
1.	"Intro"	1:53
2.	"Deathlike Silence"	5:06
3.	"Brandish the Sceptre"	2:56
4.	"Proselytism Real"	3:31
5.	"Equinox"	3:32

Side Cruelty
No.	Title	Length
6.	"Obsessed by Cruelty"	5:47
7.	"Fall of Majesty Town"	4:01
8.	"Nuctemeron"	3:00
9.	"Pretenders to the Throne"	2:39
10.	"Witchhammer"	2:02
11.	"Volcanic Slut"	3:21
Total length:		37:48

=== European version ===
Side one
No.	Title	Length
1.	"Intro (The Rebirth...)"	0:56
2.	"Deathlike Silence"	5:18
3.	"Brandish the Sceptre"	2:56
4.	"Proselytism Real"	3:25
5.	"Equinox"	3:36
6.	"After the Deluge"	4:54

Side two
No.	Title	Length
7.	"Obsessed by Cruelty"	5:05
8.	"Fall of Majesty Town"	4:04
9.	"Nuctemeron"	3:02
10.	"Pretenders to the Throne"	2:37
11.	"Witchhammer"	1:36
12.	"Volcanic Slut"	2:58
Total length:		40:27

== Personnel ==
Sodom

- Tom Angelripper – vocals, bass
- Michael Wulf – guitar (American version)
- Uwe Christophers – guitar (European version)
- Christian "Witchhunter" Dudek – drums

Production

- Bobby Bachinger – engineering
