= Frank Blackfire =

German guitarist

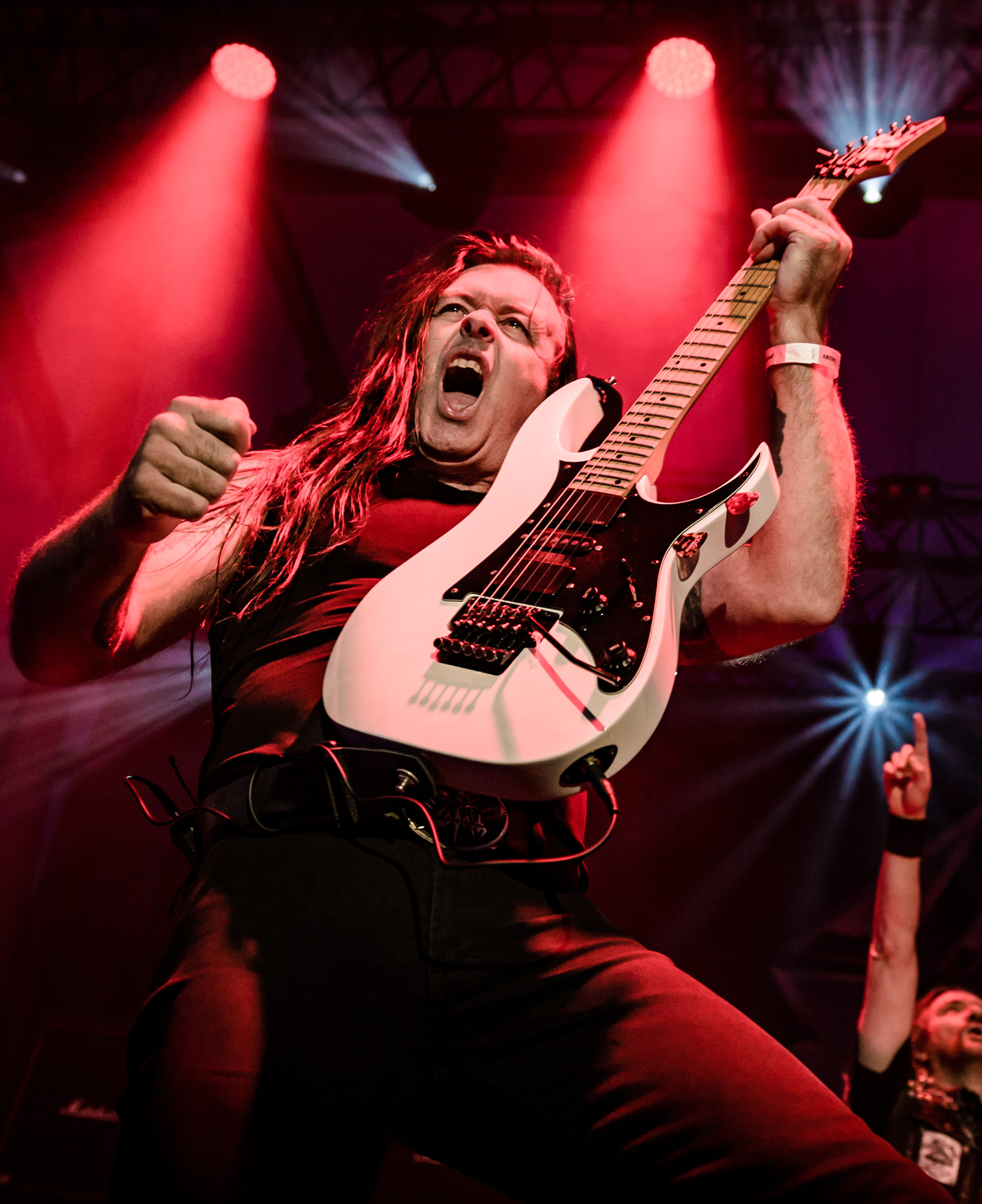
- Blackfire in 2018

Background information
- Born: Frank Gosdzik; 24 February 1966 (age 60); Essen, West Germany
- Genre: Thrash metal
- Occupation: Guitarist
- Member of: Sodom
- Formerly of: Kreator

Frank Gosdzik (born 24 February 1966), known professionally as Frank Blackfire, is a German guitarist who is a member of the thrash metal band Sodom and a former member of Kreator.

== Career ==
Gosdzik was born in Essen. Inspired by attending an AC/DC concert, he began playing the guitar at the age of eleven. After initial attempts with his self-founded band Midia, he joined Sodom in 1987, with whom he had previously shared a rehearsal room. Upon joining the band, Gosdzik adopted the stage name "Frank Blackfire". Gosdzik played on the EP Expurse of Sodomy and the album Persecution Mania in 1987, followed by the album Agent Orange in 1989.

Gosdzik left Sodom in 1989 due to personal differences. He subsequently joined Essen's Kreator, and performed on three albums by the band between 1990 and 1995: Coma of Souls, Renewal, and Cause for Conflict. In 1994, Gosdzik worked with the Brazilian band Volkana on their album Mindtrips.

Gosdzik left Kreator in 1997 and went on to pursue various experimental musical styles. He worked with jazz influences, played percussion, and founded a classic rock cover band. Gosdzik appeared as a guest musician on German black metal band Black Messiah's 1998 debut album Sceptre of Black Knowledge.

In 2000, Gosdzik moved to São Paulo, Brazil, where he worked as a guitar teacher. In 2001, Gosdzik reformed his own band, Mystic, where he also performs vocals. After two demos, Gosdzik returned to the Ruhrgebiet area in mid-2006 and continued his band under the new name Blackfire.Gosdzik played with the thrash metal band Whiplash at Wacken Open Air 2009. In 2016, Gosdzik replaced Michael Hoffmann in Assassin. In January 2018, Tom Angelripper announced Gosdzik's return to Sodom.

== Personal life ==
Blackfire is married and has a daughter.
