= Tapping the Vein (album) =

Studio album by Sodom
- Released: August 1992
- Recorded: 16 May – 12 July 1992
- Studio: Dierks Studios, Cologne
- Genre: Thrash metal; death metal
- Length: 46:11
- Label: Steamhammer/SPV
- Producer: Harris Johns

Sodom chronology
Better Off Dead (1990)	Tapping the Vein (1992)	Aber bitte mit Sahne (1993)

Tapping the Vein is the fifth studio album by German thrash metal band Sodom, released in August 1992 through Steamhammer/SPV. The album was recorded with producer Harris Johns at Dierks Studios in Cologne, Germany. The release marks the studio debut of guitarist Andy Brings and is the last album to feature original member Chris Witchhunter on drums.

The album represents a return to a heavy and fast-paced musical direction, and features notable death metal characteristics.

Tapping the Vein received positive reviews from critics, who noted the band's efforts in modernising their sound. The album peaked at number 56 on Germany's Official Top 100 Charts, and was promoted on a tour throughout Europe and Japan in 1992.

Professional ratings
Review scores
Source	Rating
AllMusic	2.5/5 stars
Rock Hard	8.5/10
MetalStorm	8/10
Metal Reviews	9/10

== Track listing ==
All lyrics are written by Tom Angelripper, except where noted; all music is composed by Sodom.

No.	Title	Lyrics	Length
1.	"Body Parts"	Chris Witchhunter	3:02
2.	"Skinned Alive"		2:27
3.	"One Step Over the Line"		5:07
4.	"Deadline"		3:52
5.	"Bullet in the Head"		3:01
6.	"The Crippler"	Witchhunter	4:10
7.	"Wachturm"		3:47
8.	"Tapping the Vein"	Andy Brings	5:11
9.	"Back to War"		3:14
10.	"Hunting Season"		4:28
11.	"Reincarnation"	Brings	7:49
Total length:			46:11

== Personnel ==
=== Sodom ===
- Tom Angelripper - vocals, bass
- Andy Brings - guitars
- Chris Witchhunter - drums

=== Production ===
- Dieter Braun - cover art
- Jürgen Huber - cover art
- Harris Johns - production, engineering, recording

== Charts ==
1992 chart performance for Tapping the Vein
Chart (1992)	Peak position
German Albums (Offizielle Top 100)	56

2024–2025 chart performance for Tapping the Vein
Chart (2024–2025)	Peak position
Austrian Albums (Ö3 Austria)	35
German Albums (Offizielle Top 100)	3
Greek Albums (IFPI)	65
Swiss Albums (Schweizer Hitparade)	32
