= Sodom (band) =

German thrash metal band

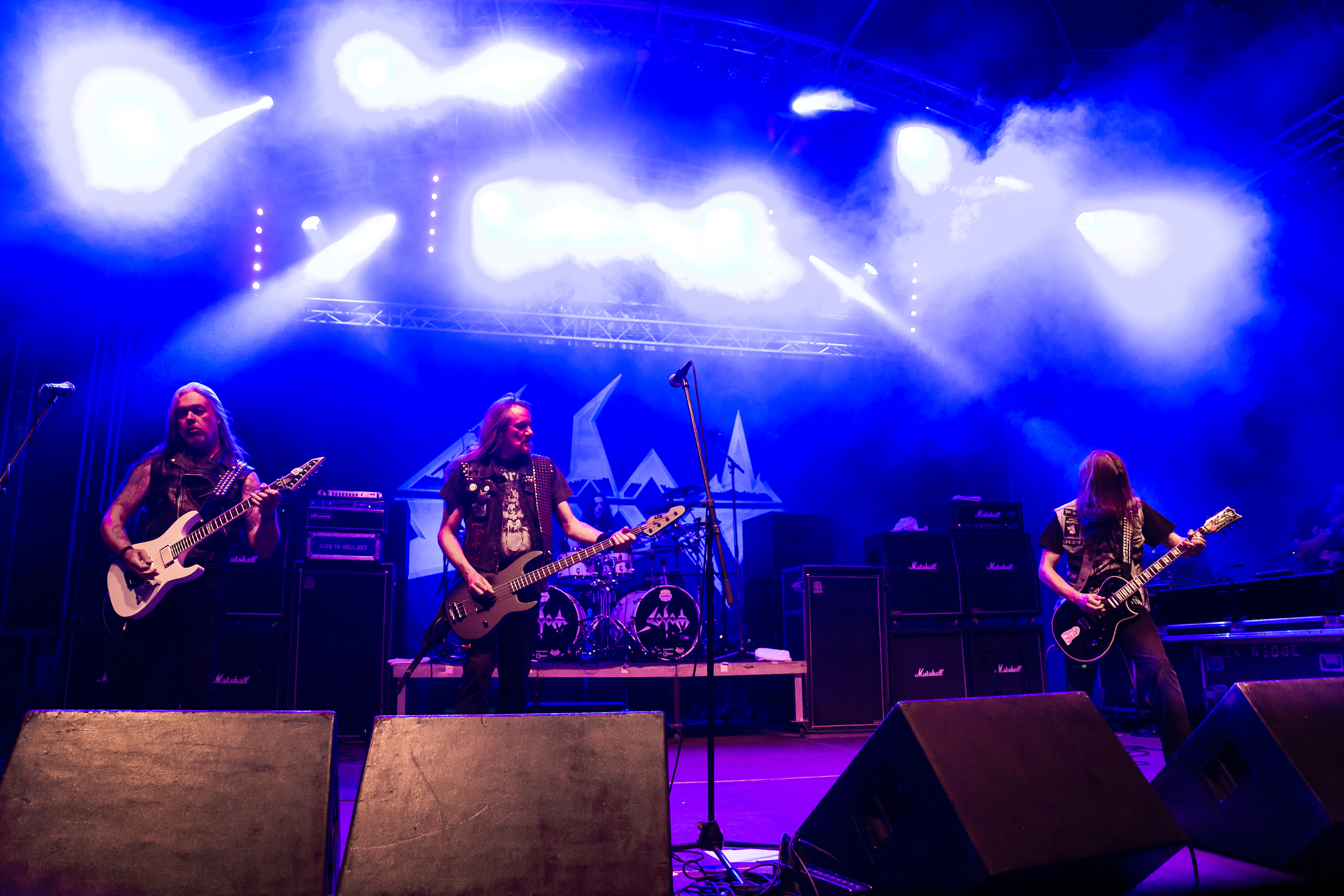
- Sodom performing in 2022

Background information
- Origin: Gelsenkirchen, North Rhine-Westphalia, West Germany
- Genres: Thrash metal; black metal (early)
- Works: Discography
- Years active: 1982–present
- Label: Steamhammer
- Members: Tom Angelripper; Frank "Blackfire" Gosdzik; Yorck Segatz; Toni Merkel
- Past members: Frank Testegen; Josef Dominic; Michael "Destructor" Wulf; Uwe Christophers; Uwe Baltrusch; Michael Hoffmann; Andy Brings; Dirk "Strahli" Strahlmeier; Christian "Witchhunter" Dudek; Atomic Steif; Bobby Schottkowski; Bernd "Bernemann" Kost; Markus "Makka" Freiwald; Stefan "Husky" Hüskens
- Website: sodomized.info

Sodom is a German thrash metal band from Gelsenkirchen, formed in 1982. They have gone through various line-up changes. Bassist/vocalist Thomas "Tom Angelripper" Such is the only constant member. The band is currently composed of Such, guitarists Frank "Blackfire" Gosdzik (a member from 1987 to 1989 and again since 2018) and Yorck Segatz, and drummer Toni Merkel. Sodom has been referred to as one of the "Big Four" of Teutonic thrash metal, along with Kreator, Destruction and Tankard. Sodom influenced the German black metal scene, and is regarded as a death metal pioneer. Referred to as the most Venom-blackened of Germany's "Three Kings" (Destruction and Kreator are the other two), Sodom merged thrash and death metal into a "wicked and decadent sound."

Sodom has released sixteen studio albums, three live albums, two compilation albums and seven EPs. They achieved commercial success with their third studio album, Agent Orange (1989), one of the first thrash metal albums to enter the German album charts, reaching number 36. Their most recent studio album, The Arsonist, was released on 27 June 2025. Sodom is one of the best-selling thrash metal acts of all time, having sold over two million records.

== History ==
=== Early years and transition from black metal to thrash metal (1982–1989) ===
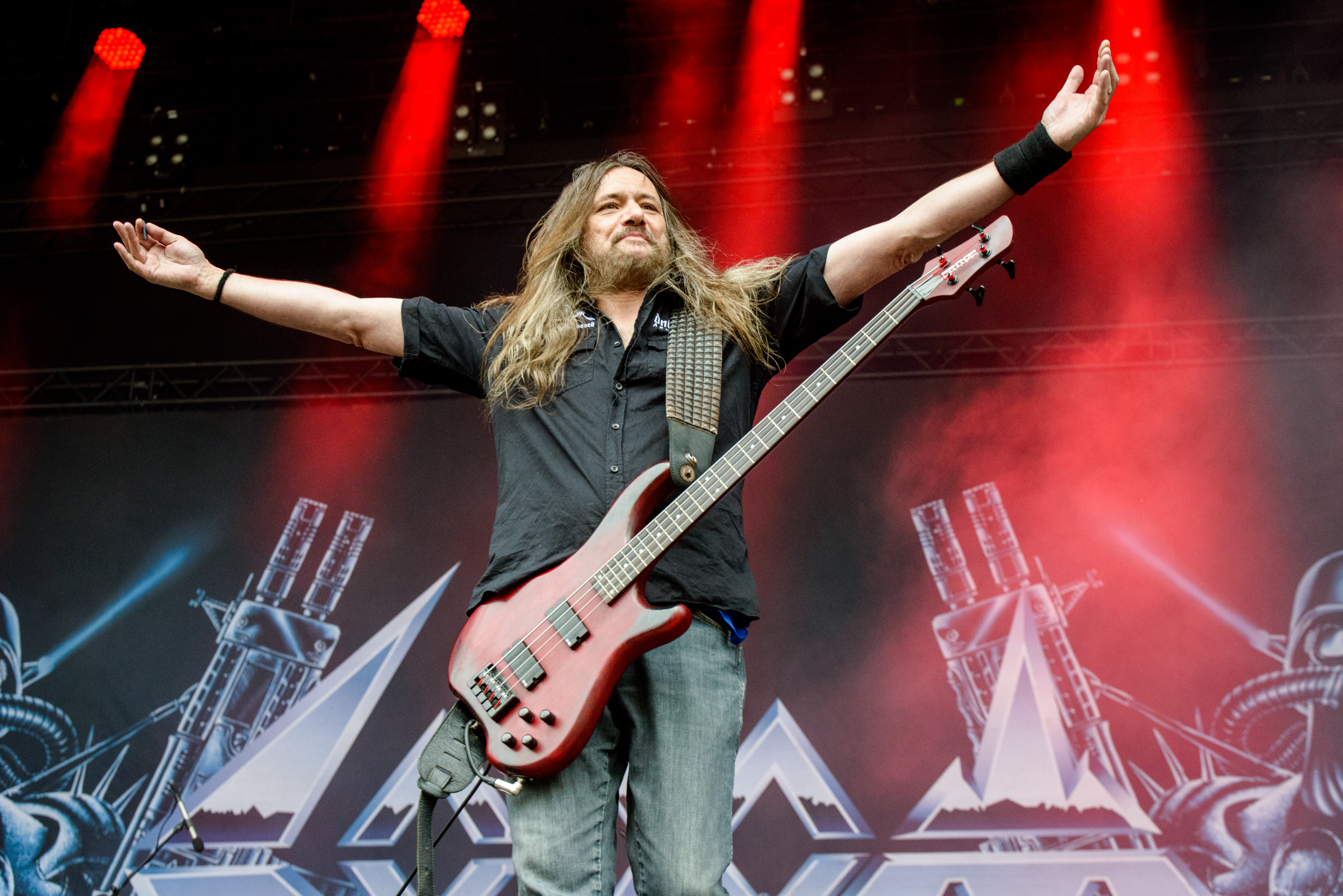
Tom Angelripper live 2016

Sodom was formed in 1982, originally consisting of Tom "Angelripper" Such, Bloody Monster, Arius "Blasphemer", and Aggressor. Reportedly named after the Venom song "One Thousand Days in Sodom", the band was initiated by Tom as an attempt to avoid working at coal mines in his home town of Gelsenkirchen. The band's lineup solidified itself when Chris Witchhunter (Christian Dudek) from Essen replaced Bloody Monster on drums, bringing songwriting experience from his time in school, and leading the band's activity after Arius was fired. Taking inspiration from bands such as Iron Maiden, Judas Priest, Motörhead, Venom, Kiss, Tank, Accept, Raven, Rainbow, AC/DC and UFO, the group continued as a three-piece akin to Motörhead and released two demos which led to a record deal with Steamhammer. Aggressor left the band shortly before the band released the In the Sign of Evil EP, which is generally regarded as an important early black metal release, and was replaced by Grave Violator, who himself left following the recording of In the Sign of Evil. Michael "Destructor" Wulf was found as a replacement, after which the band recorded Obsessed by Cruelty (1986), their full-length debut, which was in a similar style to In the Sign of Evil. Wulf's tenure in the band was short-lived, and he briefly joined Kreator after leaving Sodom; he died in a motorcycle accident in 1993.

Wulf was replaced by Frank "Blackfire" Gosdzik. Frank convinced Tom that thrash metal was moving beyond horror/occult/satanic themes of bands like Venom in favor of political, societal, and war themes. Tom was already interested in various wars yet remained a peacenik. This resulted in Gosdzik's full-length debut with the band, 1987's Persecution Mania. The new lyrical approach and increased musicianship on the part of Frank gave the band great acclaim; it was also the introduction of the band's mascot Knarrenheinz, who appeared for the first time on the cover of Persecution Mania). They subsequently toured Europe with Whiplash, Destruction, and Coroner. After that, the band returned to the studio to make another album. The resulting album, Agent Orange (1989), sold 100,000 copies in Germany alone. It was this album that made Sodom famous, giving them worldwide critical acclaim, and secured their place alongside Kreator and Destruction as one of the great Teutonic thrash metal bands. To date, Agent Orange has sold more than any other German thrash metal album in the world. Sodom toured with a then-unknown Sepultura in support of the album.

This period was marked by tensions within the band: Tom and Chris descended further into alcoholism, while Frank had grown tired of his compositions being performed poorly live. Mille Petrozza offered Frank a position in Kreator, which Frank accepted. Frank was replaced by Michael Hoffmann, formerly of German band Assassin.

=== Changes in formation (1990–1996) ===
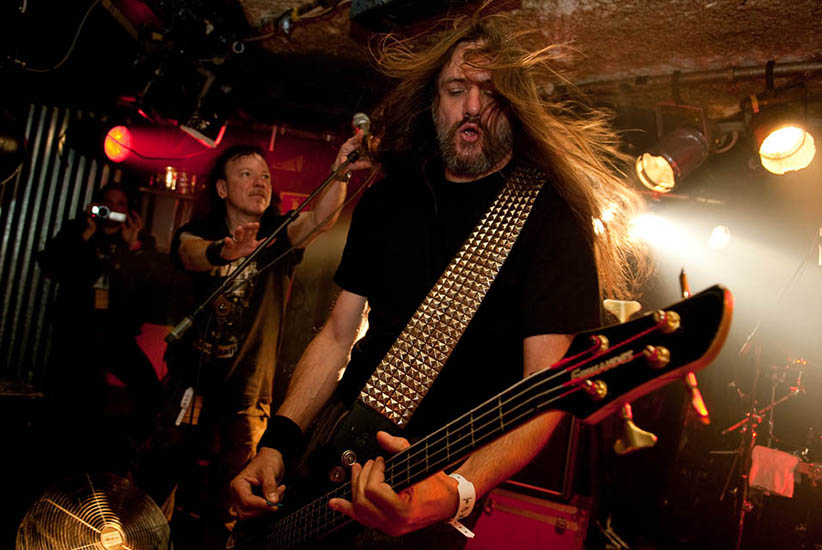
Sodom performing at Hole in the Sky festival in 2009

With Hoffman in the band, Sodom released Better off Dead in 1990, followed by a European tour with bands including Acid Drinkers, Destruction, Accu§er, Running Wild, Coroner, Tankard and Atrocity. During a South American tour, Hoffmann decided to stay in Brazil and subsequently left the band. Hoffman was replaced by Andy Brings, and Sodom recorded an album with him, Tapping the Vein (1992), which featured a death metal influence. This was the last album with drummer Witchhunter, with former Holy Moses and Living Death drummer Atomic Steif replacing him.

Sodom's next album, Get What You Deserve (1994), introduced a punk-infused sound. Get What You Deserve had an arguably grotesque album cover (featuring a dead man shot and lying in his bed with a woman tied-up nearby), and many fans did not take to the band's new direction. This period also marked the beginning of less international visibility for the band as thrash lost its commercial viability for the remainder of the 1990s, due to the rising popularity of grunge and alternative rock. Angelripper also started a solo career doing metal impressions of drinking songs, German Schlagers and even Christmas-type carols. A live album was recorded of the tour in support of the resulting album called Marooned – Live.

Masquerade in Blood added groove metal to the group's evolving blend of crossover thrash and death metal. It was released in 1995 and the update of their style was successful. Again another guitarist had to be found. The new choice, Strahli, did not stay very long with the band. He was arrested and imprisoned on drug-related matters, and the band had since lost contact with him, until January 2011, when they learned that he had died in Düsseldorf. Atomic Steif also left and again Angelripper needed to search for new members. These were found: a guitarist in Bernemann and a drummer in Bobby Schottkowski. This line-up stabilized the band significantly and lasted until December 2010, when Schottkowski left.

=== Return to thrash metal (1997–2009) ===
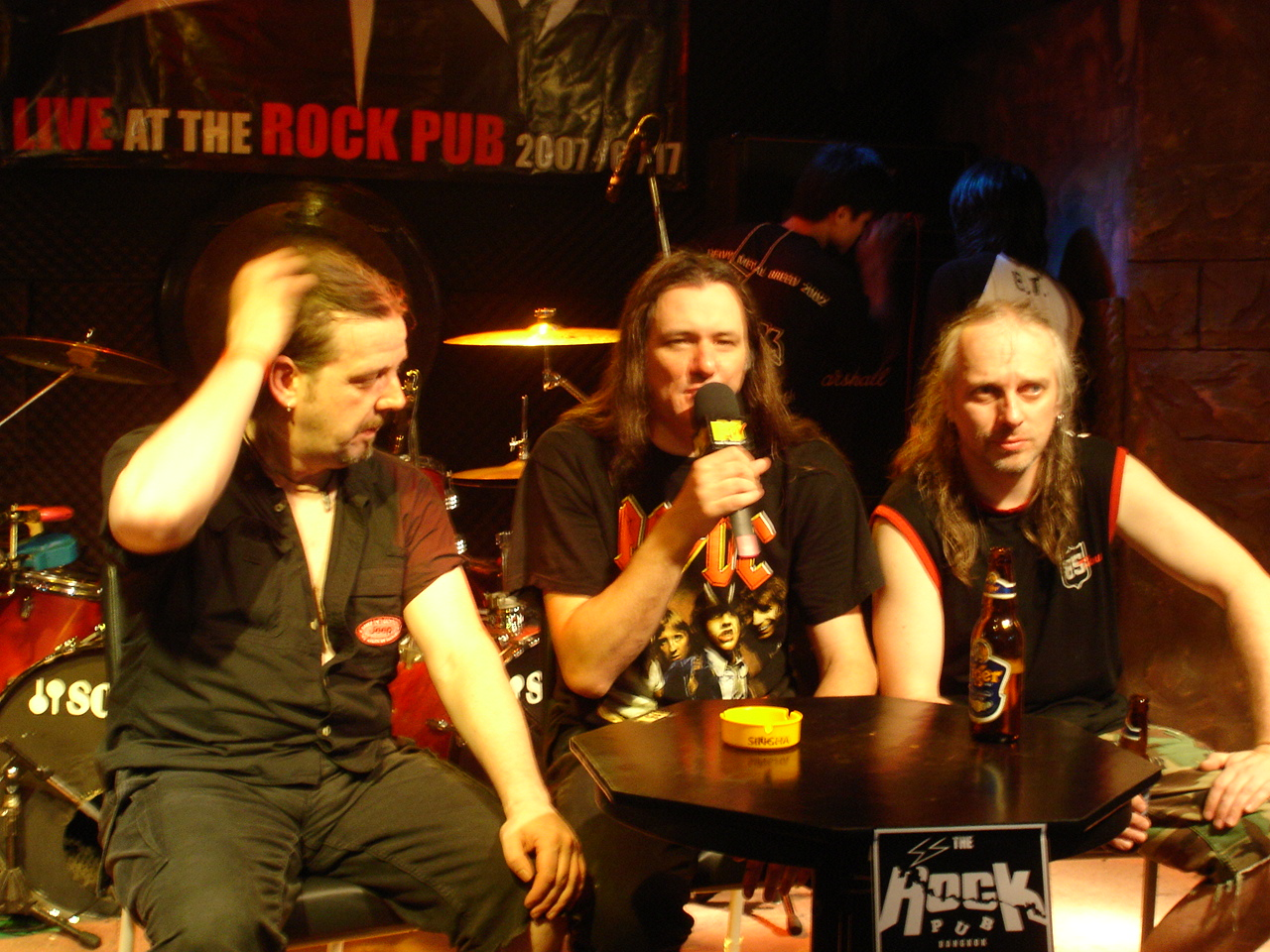
Sodom in Bangkok, Thailand (2007)

Sodom's eighth studio album 'Til Death Do Us Unite (1997) spawned the song for which Sodom would make their most famous music video, the highly-controversial song "Fuck the Police". After this album, Sodom returned to the studio and released Code Red in 1999 which marked a full return to the Teutonic thrash metal sound of the 1980s, and it was met with praise from fans and press alike. A limited edition featured a bonus CD containing a tribute to Sodom album, Homage to the Gods. With 2001 came the release of M-16, a concept album about the movie Apocalypse Now, which took its title from the famed M16 assault rifle.

In 2003, a double live album was recorded in Bangkok, Thailand, titled One Night in Bangkok. A new album simply titled Sodom was released in 2006, in the same vein as M-16. The title was chosen – as Angelripper explained it – "because every band needs a self-titled album", and the band had never released one. The album was delayed however, because the DVD Lords of Depravity took more time to compose than initially thought.

In 2007, Tom was asked by the record label Steamhammer for any tracks to be released on the In the Sign of Evil EP. Tom believed there were, and the label floated the idea to Tom to get former members Chris Witchhunter and Grave Violator (real name: Franz Josef "Peppi" Dominik) to re-record the EP with the bonus tracks. The result became The Final Sign of Evil. Chris "Witchhunter" Dudek died on 7 September 2008 from liver failure after a long battle with illness. Sodom played at Wacken Open Air in August 2007.

In 2009, Sodom returned to the UK to play their first show in the country in 20 years at Bloodstock Open Air.

=== Markus "Makka" Freiwald-era (2010–2017) ===
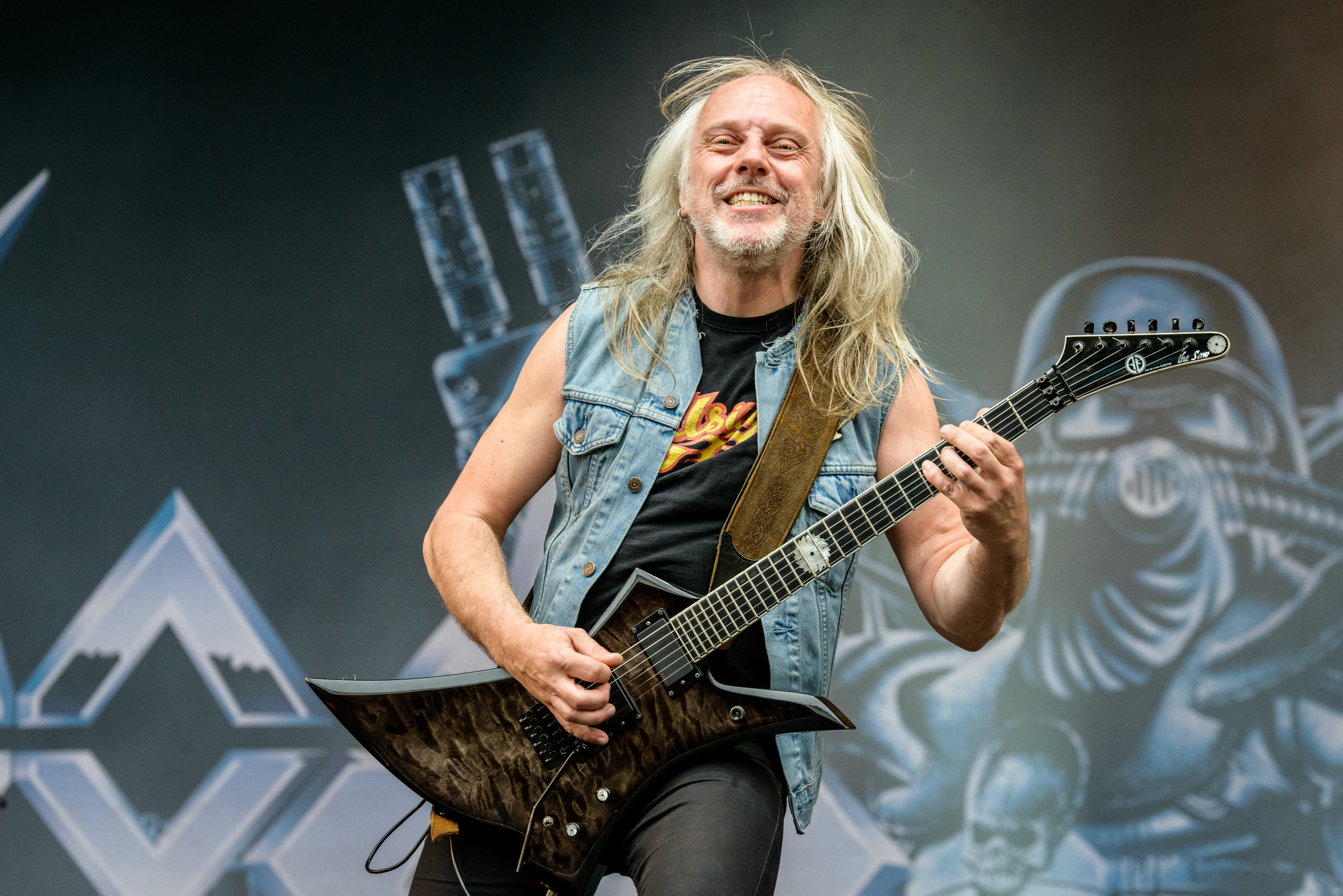
Bernd "Bernemann" Kost in 2016

Sodom's thirteenth studio album, In War and Pieces, was released in Europe on 22 November 2010, and released in North America on 11 January 2011. On 30 November 2010, it was announced that Bobby Schottkowski would be leaving the band, due to "personal and private problems" between Tom Angelripper and Schottkowski. On 8 December 2010, Markus "Makka" Freiwald was announced to be Sodom's new drummer. They performed at Wacken Open Air in 2011.

In late January 2012, Sodom began writing their fourteenth studio album, which they had planned to record in May 2012 for a late summer release. On 17 December 2012, the band announced the album would be released on 29 April 2013. The album is titled Epitome of Torture and features 13 tracks. The album was released in Germany on 26 April, and in the US on 7 May.

In November 2014, Sodom released the EP Sacred Warpath as a preview of their fifteenth studio album. The EP contains one original studio track, and live versions of three previously released songs.

On 9 June 2016, Sodom announced their fifteenth studio album Decision Day on their Facebook page. It was released on August 26 of that year.

Sodom released the compilation album, Demonized, on 1 September 2017. Available only on cassette and 12" vinyl, it features the band's first two demo recordings, Witching Metal from 1982 and Victims of Death from 1984.

Shortly after the release of Decision Day, Angelripper stated that Sodom had "some ideas for [their] next album which [they] want to bring out in 2018."

=== Reunion with Frank "Blackfire" Gosdzik, series of EPs and Genesis XIX (2017–2021) ===
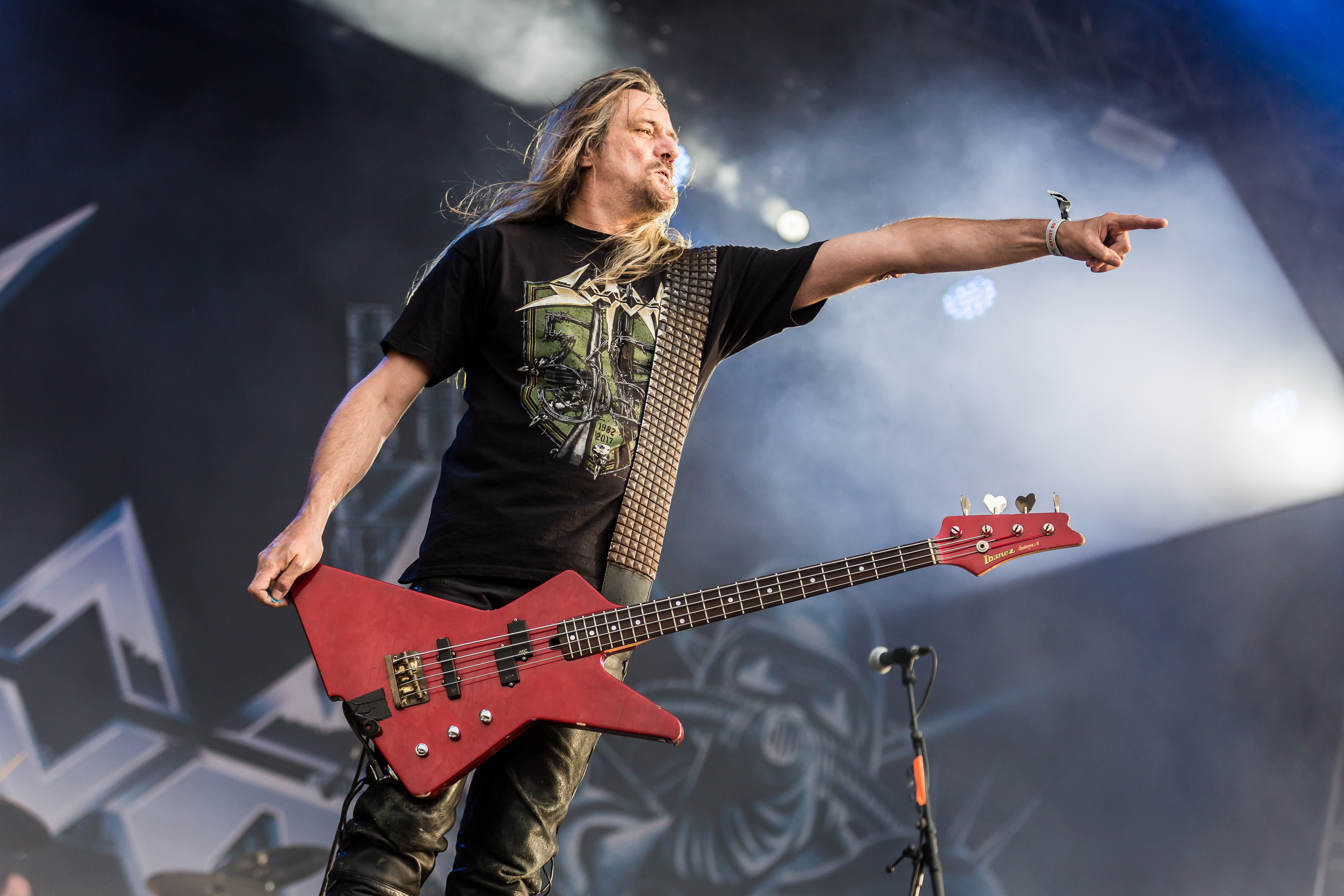
Tom Angelripper at Rockharz Open Air 2018

On 3 December 2017, Sodom announced that they would reunite with three of their former guitarists Josef "Grave Violator" Dominic (who performed on In the Sign of Evil), Frank "Blackfire" Gosdzik (Persecution Mania and Agent Orange) and Andy Brings (Tapping the Vein and Get What You Deserve) during their 35th anniversary show on 26 December in Bochum, Germany, marking the first time since Dominic, Gosdzik and Brings left the band in 1985, 1989, and 1995, respectively, that either guitarist had performed live with Sodom. Their previous performances were at Wacken in 2007. They performed three songs separate from one another's appearances from the respective albums they appeared on.

On 5 January 2018, Angelripper announced his partings from Bernemann and Makka "to pave the way for new challenges." He then said that he would introduce the new members on 7 April at the 2018 edition of the Full Metal Mountain festival, and that they would work on a new album together. Bernemann and Makka later said that they were fired from the band via WhatsApp without Angelripper listening to the new material they were working on for the band's next album. On 22 January 2018, Angelripper announced that he had expanded the band's line-up as a four piece. He was rejoined by guitarist Frank "Blackfire" Gosdzik and added Stefan "Husky" Hüskens and Yorck Segatz as the band's new drummer and second guitarist respectively. On 26 February 2018, Sodom cancelled their appearance at the Full Metal Mountain festival "due to the short-term change of line-up and the restructuring of my band Sodom", as explained by Angelripper. He then said that the time was "simply too short to put the new line-up in a solid live set". The new line-up of the band made their live debut on 18 May at the 2018 edition of the Rock Hard Festival. Sodom also participated in the 2018 installment of the MTV Headbangers Ball European Tour with Death Angel, Suicidal Angels and Exodus from late November to mid-December. This new line-up recorded the EPs Partisan (2018) and Out of the Frontline Trench (2019).

On 13 January 2020, drummer Stefan "Husky" Hüskens departed the band due to "some changes at [his] full-time job, as well as a few other matters", and would not return in the future. He was replaced by Toni Merkel.

On 12 June 2020, Sodom announced that they had begun recording their sixteenth studio album, entitled Genesis XIX, at Woodhouse Studio in Hagen, Germany with producer Siggi Bemm. Mixing of the album was completed in August 2020. A month later, it was announced that the album would be released on 27 November.

On 11 May 2021, Sodom announced an EP titled Bombenhagel, containing a re-recorded version of the song "Bombenhagel" from their 1987 album Persecution Mania as well as two new tracks, was set to be released on 20 August.

=== 40 Years at War – The Greatest Hell of Sodom and The Arsonist (2021–2025) ===
In a December 2021 interview with Rockman, Tom Angelripper revealed that Sodom had begun writing new material for their next album. A month later, Sodom was announced as one of the bands to have its contract with SPV/Steamhammer Records renewed. In May 2022, Angelripper said that the band's new album would be released in 2023; he later stated that it would not be released until 2024. Angelripper confirmed in September 2024 that the album was finished for a late 2024 or early 2025 release. The resulting album, titled The Arsonist, was released on 27 June 2025.

To coincide with the band's 40th anniversary, Sodom released the compilation album 40 Years at War – The Greatest Hell of Sodom on 28 October 2022. The set includes one song from each of the band's studio albums between Obsessed by Cruelty and Genesis XIX, in addition to "Sepulchral Voice" from the In the Sign of Evil EP. The band released another EP, 1982, on 10 November 2023, which includes both the title track and re-recordings of the band's early songs.

In March 2024, the band participated in the Hell's Heroes music festival, which took place at White Oak Music Hall in Houston. They co-headlined with Queensrÿche.

On 20 July 2024, Sodom were part of the Klash of the Ruhrpott festival, which took place at Amphitheater Gelsenkirchen in Gelsenkirchen, Germany. This show marked the first time and the long awaited union of all of the "Teutonic Big Four" bands performing on the same stage.

=== Touring hiatus and future plans (2025–present) ===
In January 2025, Tom Angelripper expressed his desire to slow down the band's touring for the foreseeable future for personal and business reasons, and was uncertain of his return to live performances. This indicated that following the release of The Arsonist, Sodom would go on an immediate and indefinite hiatus. On 31 August 2025, former drummer Guido "Atomic Steif" Richter died at the age of 57. His death was confirmed on 6 September 2025.

In February 2026, Angelripper confirmed that, despite no longer playing live, Sodom will continue to release new music: "We have an option [for a new album] with [our longtime record label] SPV. That is another thing. They wanna have a new album. I don't know when, but I think in the next one or two years we're talking about a new album."

== Artistry ==
=== Musical style and influences ===
In the early days, Sodom's lyrics focused on Satanic and occult themes, but since Persecution Mania, most of their songs have covered topics based on, inspired by, or related to the concepts of war, politics, fascism and world history. Some of their songs have also covered topics dealing with religion, rape or sexual intercourse, often presented in a humorous light. Their political-related lyrics had led some people to think that the band was militarist, but on closer observation the listener would find the lyrics actually being anti-war. In an interview with Metalkings.com, Tom Angelripper said: "Why are we writing about war? Because we don't want war. We wanna describe how bad the war is." The chorus of the song "Ausgebombt" also gives a very clear message: "No trade with death, No trade with arms, Dispense the war, Learn from the past."

Sodom has been influenced or inspired by a variety of music, including AC/DC, Accept, Anvil, Jeff Beck, Black Sabbath, Deep Purple, Fates Warning, Jimi Hendrix, Iron Maiden, Judas Priest, Kiss, the Mahavishnu Orchestra, Mercyful Fate, Motörhead, Pink Floyd, Queen, Rainbow, Santana, Saxon, Scorpions, Slade, Slayer, Tank, Thin Lizzy, UFO, Uriah Heep, Steve Vai, Venom and Frank Zappa.

=== Legacy and influence ===
Sodom has influenced numerous metal acts such as Burzum, Cannibal Corpse, Dark Tranquility, Deicide, Enslaved, Evildead, Evile, Incantation, Mayhem, Morbid Angel, Necrodeath, Power Trip, Necromantia, Obituary, Rotting Christ, Sepultura and Tsjuder.

In 2025, Zahra Huselid of Screen Rant included the band in the site's list of "10 Best Thrash Metal Bands Who Weren't The Big Four".

== Band members ==
Current

- Tom "Angelripper" Such — bass (1982–present), vocals (1984–present)
- Frank "Blackfire" Gosdzik — lead guitar (1986–1989, 2018–present)
- Yorck Segatz — rhythm guitar (2018–present)
- Toni Merkel — drums (2020–present)

== Discography ==
- Obsessed by Cruelty (1986)
- Persecution Mania (1987)
- Agent Orange (1989)
- Better Off Dead (1990)
- Tapping the Vein (1992)
- Get What You Deserve (1994)
- Masquerade in Blood (1995)
- 'Til Death Do Us Unite (1997)
- Code Red (1999)
- M-16 (2001)
- Sodom (2006)
- The Final Sign of Evil (2007)
- In War and Pieces (2010)
- Epitome of Torture (2013)
- Decision Day (2016)
- Genesis XIX (2020)
- The Arsonist (2025)
