= Tom Angelripper =

German musician

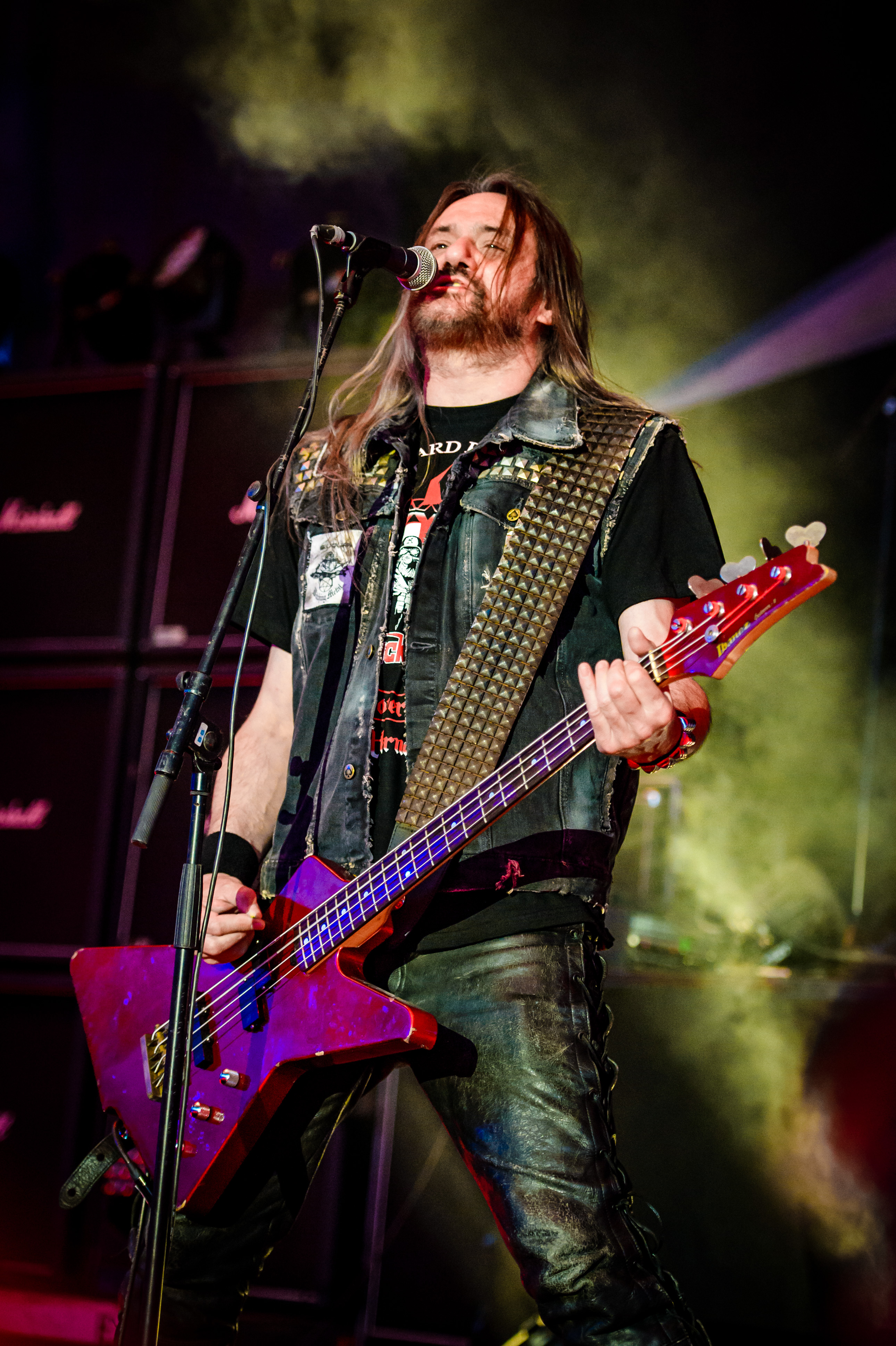
- Angelripper performing in 2018

Background information
- Also known as: Onkel Tom; Onkel Tom Angelripper
- Born: Thomas Such; 19 February 1963 (age 63); Gelsenkirchen, West Germany
- Genres: Thrash metal
- Occupations: Musician, songwriter
- Instruments: Vocals, bass guitar
- Years active: 1981–present

Thomas Such (born 19 February 1963), known professionally as Tom Angelripper, is a German musician. He is the lead vocalist, bassist, main songwriter and only original remaining member of the thrash metal band Sodom and also a member of the bass guitar-focused side project Bassinvaders. He has also released solo albums under the name Onkel Tom.

== Biography ==
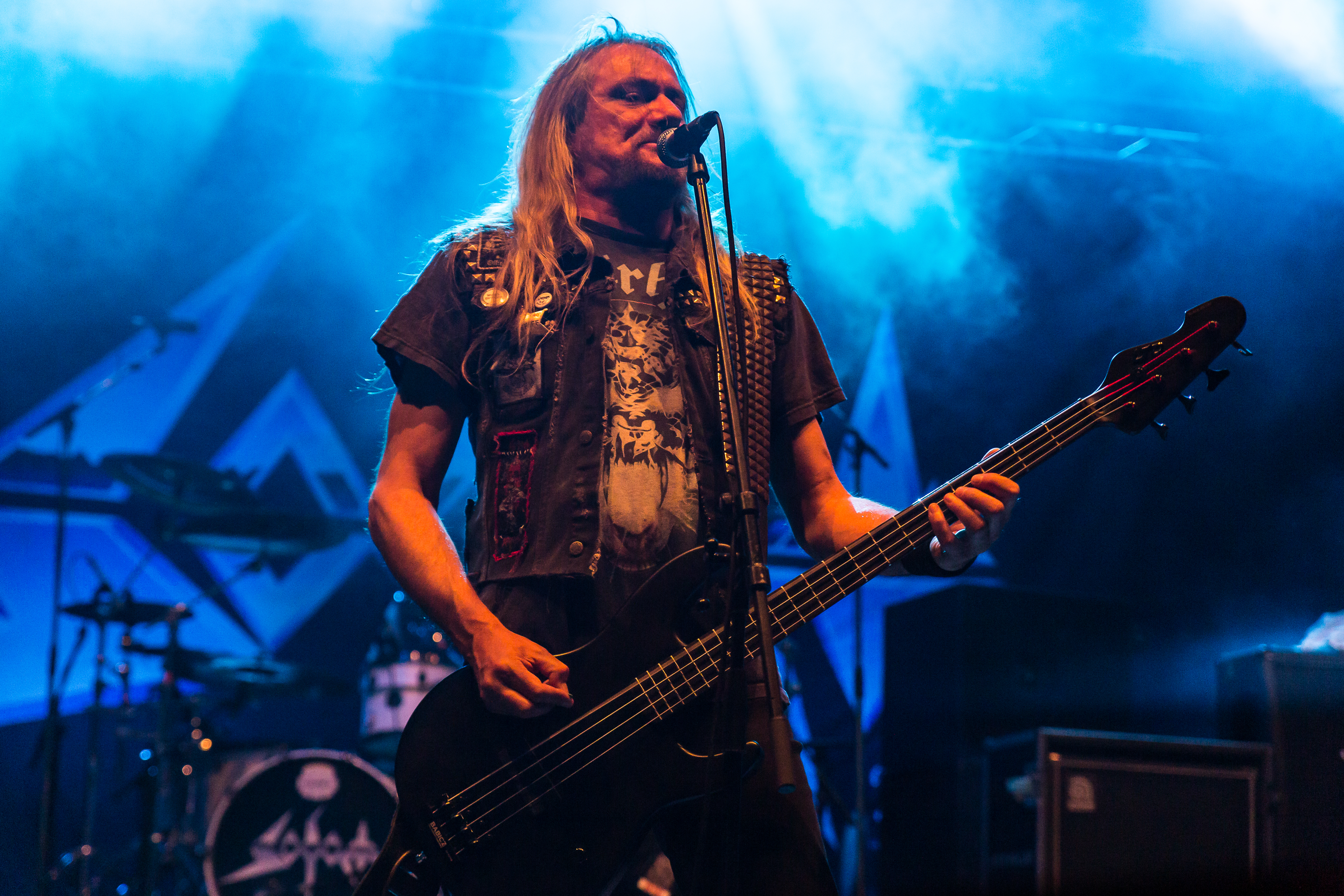
Angelripper in 2022

Thomas Such was born in Gelsenkirchen on 19 February 1963, from where he learned to play bass steadily whilst working in coal mines. He then went on, as Tom Angelripper, to be one of the founding members of the German thrash metal band Sodom. He originally started off as just the bassist, but ended up becoming the vocalist and has done both on every studio release.

In Sodom, Angelripper plays bass and sings. Angelripper formed Sodom with guitarist Frank "Aggressor" Testegen and drummer Rainer "Bloody Monster" Focke in 1982, in a desperate bid to get out of work in the coal mines that the three had worked in.

Angelripper also founded a band called Onkel Tom Angelripper which plays metal versions of schlagers, drinking songs and Christmas carols. In addition, he worked with a side project of Sodom's touring guitarist Alex Kraft, called Desperados, which played spaghetti Western-themed heavy metal. The band later evolved independently under the name of Dezperadoz, but Angelripper still occasionally contributes.

He also plays in several other side projects, such as the German bands Bassinvaders and Die Knappen and guested on Warfare's "Cemetery Dirt" single.

== Discography ==
=== Solo ===
Studio albums

- Ein schöner Tag... (1996)
- Ein Tröpfchen voller Glück (1998)
- Ein Strauß bunter Melodien (1999)
- Ich glaub' nicht an den Weihnachtsmann (2000)
- Nunc Est Bibendum (2011)
- H.E.L.D. (2014)
- Bier Ernst (2018)

Compilation albums

- Das blaueste Album der Welt! (1999)
- Die volle Dröhnung (2003)
- Ich glaub' nicht an den Weihnachtsmann (2006)

=== With Dezperadoz ===
Studio albums

- The Dawn of Dying (2000)

=== With Bassinvaders ===
Studio albums

- Hellbassbeaters (2008)

== Filmography ==
=== Actor ===
- Lunatics: Torture (music video, 1990) – Chauffeur
- Onslaught feat. Phil Campbell and Tom Angelripper: Bomber (music video, 2010) – Himself

=== Writer ===
- Sodom: Silence Is Consent (short, 1994) (writer)

=== Second unit or assistant director ===
- Sodom: Lords of Depravity: Part I (2005) – (assistant director)

=== Composer ===
- Sodom: Silence Is Consent (short, 1994) – (composer)

=== Soundtrack ===
- Klimbim (TV series, 1975) – (writer: "Caramba, Caracho, ein Whisky")

=== Self ===
- Sodom: Silence Is Consent (short, 1994) – Himself
- Wacken Metal Overdrive (video, 2003) – Himself
- Sodom: Lords of Depravity: Part I (2005) – Himself
- Get Thrashed: The Story of Thrash Metal (2006) – Himself – Sodom
- Destruction: A Savage Symphony – The History of Annihilation (video, 2010) – Himself
- Schwarzes Gold – Musik im Ruhrgebiet (TV movie, 2010) – Himself
- Sodom: Lords of Depravity: Part II (video, 2010) – Himself
- Doro: 25 Years in Rock (video, 2010) – Himself
- Atrocity: Die gottlosen Jahre (video, 2012) – Himself
- Coroner: Rewind (video, 2016) – Himself
