= Destruction discography =

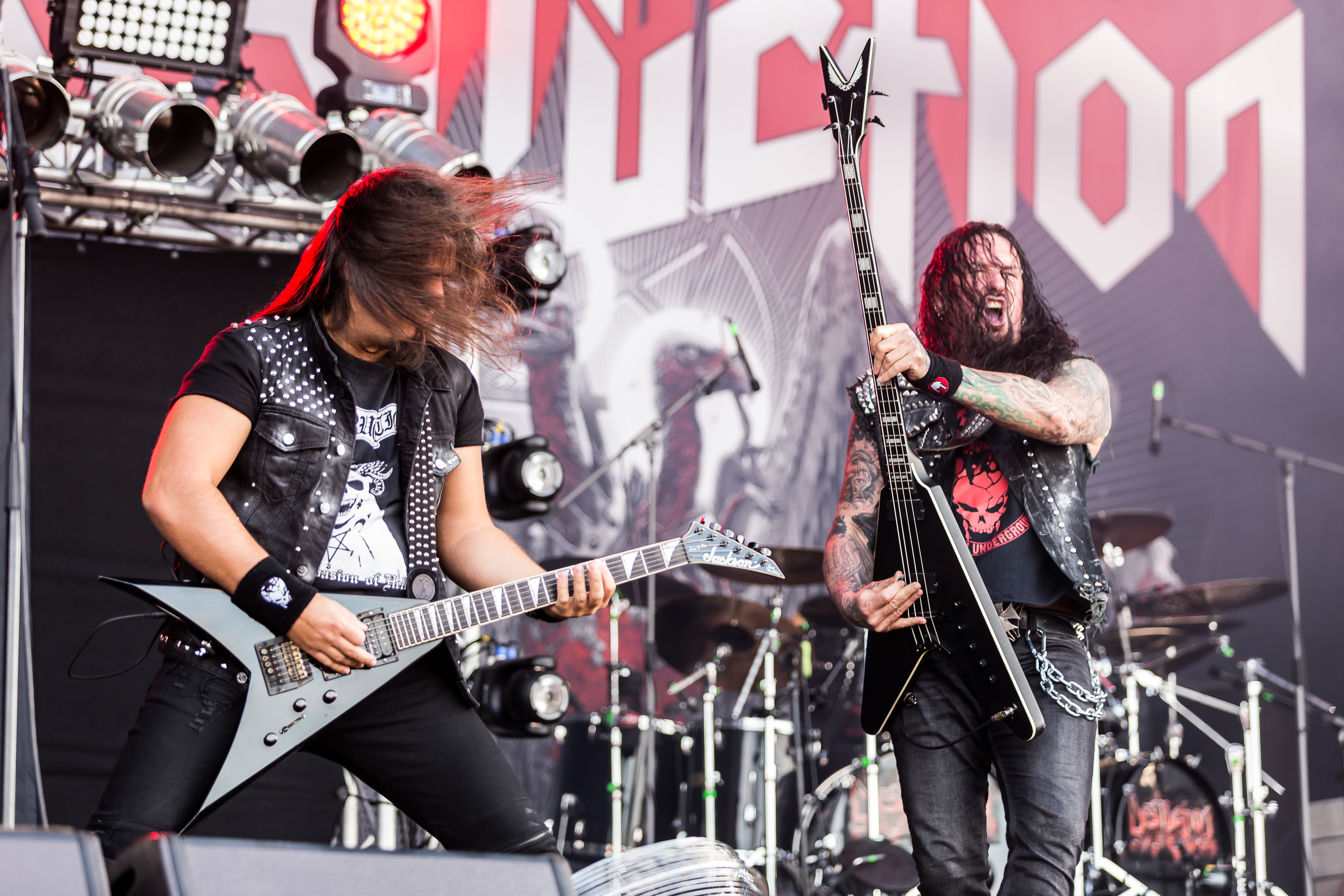
- Destruction performing in 2019
- Studio albums: 16
- EPs: 4
- Live albums: 5
- Compilation albums: 3
- Music videos: 6
- Demos: 3

This is the discography for German thrash metal band Destruction.

== Studio albums ==
List of studio albums, with chart positions
| Year | Album details | Peak chart positions | |
| Year | Album details | GER | SWI |
|---|---|---|---|
| 1985 | Infernal Overkill: Released: 24 May 1985; Label: Steamhammer/SPV; Format: LP, MC, CD | — | — |
| 1986 | Eternal Devastation: Released: 12 July 1986; Label: Steamhammer/SPV; Format: LP, MC, CD | — | — |
| 1987 | Release from Agony: Released: 1 December 1987; Label: Steamhammer/SPV; Format: LP, MC, CD | — | — |
| 1990 | Cracked Brain: Released: 1 June 1990; Label: Noise; Format: LP, MC, CD | — | — |
| 1998 | The Least Successful Human Cannonball: Released: 1998; Label: Brain Butcher; Format: CD | — | — |
| 2000 | All Hell Breaks Loose: Released: 25 April 2000; Label: Nuclear Blast; Format: CD, LP, MC | 67 | — |
| 2001 | The Antichrist: Released: 27 August 2001; Label: Nuclear Blast; Format: CD, LP, MC | 89 | — |
| 2003 | Metal Discharge: Released: 22 September 2003; Label: Nuclear Blast; Format: CD, LP | — | — |
| 2005 | Inventor of Evil: Released: 22 August 2005; Label: AFM; Format: CD, LP | 68 | — |
| 2008 | D.E.V.O.L.U.T.I.O.N.: Released: 29 August 2008; Label: AFM; Format: CD, LP | 65 | — |
| 2011 | Day of Reckoning: Released: 18 February 2011; Label: Nuclear Blast; Format: CD, LP | 95 | — |
| 2012 | Spiritual Genocide: Released: 23 November 2012; Label: Nuclear Blast; Format: CD, LP | — | — |
| 2016 | Under Attack: Released: 13 May 2016; Label: Nuclear Blast; Format: CD, LP | 68 | 90 |
| 2019 | Born to Perish: Released: 9 August 2019; Label: Nuclear Blast; Format: CD, LP, digital download, streaming | 26 | 36 |
| 2022 | Diabolical: Released: 8 April 2022; Label: Napalm Records; Format: CD, LP, digital download, streaming | 12 | 19 |
| 2025 | Birth of Malice: Released: 7 March 2025; Label: Napalm Records; Format: CD, LP, digital download, streaming | 10 | 23 |
"—" denotes a recording that did not chart or was not released in that territory.

Note: Released during the Neo-Destruction period.

== Live albums ==
List of live albums
| Year | Album details |
|---|---|
| 1989 | Live Without Sense: Released: 1989; Label: Steamhammer/SPV; Format: LP, MC, CD |
| 2002 | Alive Devastation: Released: 2002; Label: n/a; Format: n/a |
| 2004 | Live Discharge: Released: 4 March 2004; Label: Nuclear Blast; Format: CD+DVD |
| 2009 | The Curse of the Antichrist: Live in Agony: Released: 25 September 2009; Label: AFM; Format: CD, LP |
| 2010 | A Savage Symphony - The History of Annihilation: Released: 29 January 2010; Label: AFM; Format: CD, CD+DVD |

== Compilations ==
List of compilations
| Year | Album details |
|---|---|
| 2007 | Thrash Anthems (Album of re-recorded old material along with two new songs): Released: 19 January 2007; Label: AFM; Format: CD, LP |
| 2017 | Thrash Anthems II (Album of re-recorded old material): Released: 10 November 2017; Label: Nuclear Blast; Format: CD, LP |

== EPs ==
List of EPs
| Year | Album details |
|---|---|
| 1984 | Sentence of Death: Released: 10 November 1984; Label: Steamhammer/SPV; Format: LP, MC, CD |
| 1987 | Mad Butcher: Released: February 1987; Label: Steamhammer/SPV; Format: LP, CD |
| 1994 | Destruction: Released: 26 February 1994; Label: Brain Butcher; Format: CD |
| 1995 | Them Not Me: Released: 9 June 1995; Label: Brain Butcher; Format: CD |

Note: Released during the Neo-Destruction period.

== Demos ==
List of demos
| Year | Album details |
|---|---|
| 1984 | Bestial Invasion of Hell: Released: 10 August 1984; Label: independent; Format: MC |
| 1999 | The Butcher Strikes Back: Released: 11 July 1999; Label: independent; Format: CD |

== Music videos ==
| Title | Album |
|---|---|
| "The Ravenous Beast" | Metal Discharge |
| "Desecrators of the New Age" | Metal Discharge |
| "Soul Collector" | Inventor of Evil |
| "The Alliance of Hellhoundz" | Inventor of Evil |
| "Total Desaster" | Thrash Anthems |
| "Vicious Circle - The Seven Deadly Sins" | D.E.V.O.L.U.T.I.O.N. |
| "Hate is My Fuel" | Day of Reckoning |
| "Carnivore" | Spiritual Genocide |
| "Under Attack" | Under Attack |
| "United by Hatred" | Thrash Anthems II |
| "Betrayal" | Born to Perish |
| "Inspired By Death" | Born to Perish |
| "State of Apathy" | Diabolical |
| "Diabolical" | Diabolical |
| "No Faith in Humanity" | Diabolical |
| "Repent Your Sins" | Diabolical |
| "No Kings - No Masters" | Birth of Malice |
| "Destruction" | Birth of Malice |
| "A.N.G.S.T." | Birth of Malice |
| "Scumbag Human Race" | Birth of Malice |
