= Thrash Anthems =

Studio album / compilation album by Destruction
- Released: 19 January 2007
- Recorded: October–November 2006
- Genre: Thrash metal
- Length: 72:14
- Label: AFM
- Producer: Destruction

Destruction chronology
Inventor of Evil (2005)	Thrash Anthems (2007)	D.E.V.O.L.U.T.I.O.N. (2008)

Professional ratings
Review scores
Source	Rating
About.com	4/5 stars
AllMusic	3.5/5 stars
Blabbermouth.net	8/10
Exclaim!	favorable
Rock Hard	9/10

Thrash Anthems is an album released by the German thrash metal band Destruction on January 19, 2007. It comprises re-recordings of old songs and two new ones: "Deposition (Your Heads Will Roll)" and "Profanity".

The limited digipak edition includes one bonus track ("Eternal Ban") and a video clip for "Total Desaster". The 2-LP version does not include the bonus track and the running order of the tracks is partly different. A sequel to this album titled Thrash Anthems II was released in November 2017 and features a selection of other classic songs that have been newly re-recorded.

== Track listing ==
All tracks are written by Destruction except where noted.

No.	Title	Writer(s)	Original album	Length
1.	"Bestial Invasion"		Infernal Overkill	4:38
2.	"Profanity"	Sifringer, Schirmer		5:56
3.	"Release from Agony"		Release from Agony	4:36
4.	"Mad Butcher"		Mad Butcher	3:45
5.	"Reject Emotions"		Mad Butcher	5:52
6.	"Death Trap"		Infernal Overkill	4:52
7.	"Cracked Brain"		Cracked Brain	3:46
8.	"Life Without Sense"		Eternal Devastation	6:22
9.	"Total Desaster"		Sentence of Death	3:26
10.	"Deposition (Your Heads Will Roll)"	Sifringer, Schirmer		5:11
11.	"Invincible Force"		Infernal Overkill	3:44
12.	"Sign of Fear"		Release from Agony	6:36
13.	"Tormentor"		Infernal Overkill	3:55
14.	"Unconscious Ruins"		Release from Agony	4:17
15.	"Curse the Gods"		Eternal Devastation	5:16
Total length:				72:14

Limited digipack edition bonus track
No.	Title	Original Album	Length
16.	"Eternal Ban"	Eternal Devastation	3:14
Total length:			75:28

== Credits ==
Writing, performance and production credits are adapted from the album's liner notes.

=== Personnel ===
Destruction

- Schmier – bass, lead vocals
- Mike Sifringer – guitars
- Marc Reign – drums, backing vocals

Guest musicians

- Harry Wilkens – guitar solo on "Release from Agony", "Cracked Brain"
- Jacob Hansen – guitar solo on "Death Trap", "Invincible Force"
- V.O. Pulver – guitar solo on "Unconscious Ruins"

Additional musicians

- V.O. Pulver – backing vocals
- Franky Winkelmann – backing vocals
- Harry Wilkens – backing vocals
- Andre Grieder – backing vocals
- Ramona Götz – backing vocals

Production

- Destruction – production
- V.O. Pulver – engineering
- Gero Krenz – engineering
- Franky Winkelmann – engineering
- Jacob Hansen – mixing, mastering

Artwork and design

- Marco Schirmer – artwork
- Katja Piolka – photography

=== Studios ===
- House of Music Studios, Winterbach, Germany – recording
- Little Creek Studio, Gelterkinden, Switzerland – recording
- Hansen Studios, Ribe, Denmark – mixing, mastering
