= The Curse of the Antichrist: Live in Agony =

Live album by Destruction
- Released: 25 September 2009
- Recorded: 2007
- Genre: Thrash metal
- Length: 97:59
- Label: AFM
- Producer: Marcel Schirmer

Destruction chronology
D.E.V.O.L.U.T.I.O.N. (2008)	The Curse of the Antichrist: Live in Agony (2009)	Day of Reckoning (2011)

The Curse of the Antichrist: Live in Agony is the third live album released by German thrash metal band Destruction. It was released on 25 September 2009 by AFM Records.

== Track listing ==
Disc 1
No.	Title	Length
1.	"The Butcher Strikes Back"	4:11
2.	"Curse the Gods"	5:54
3.	"Nailed to the Cross"	3:48
4.	"Mad Butcher"	4:22
5.	"The Alliance of Hellhoundz"	6:42
6.	"Devolution"	5:50
7.	"Eternal Ban"	3:30
8.	"Urge (The Greed of Gain)"	4:39
9.	"Thrash Till Death"	5:06
10.	"Metal Discharge"	4:24
Total length:		48:26

Disc 2
No.	Title	Length
1.	"The Damned" (Plasmatics cover)	2:02
2.	"Cracked Brain"	1:58
3.	"Soul Collector"	4:39
4.	"Death Trap"	2:14
5.	"Unconscious Ruins"	3:25
6.	"Live Without Sense"	7:22
7.	"Vicious Circle - The Seven Deadly Sins"	4:56
8.	"Antichrist"	2:52
9.	"Reject Emotions"	2:27
10.	"Thrash Till Death"	6:37
11.	"Total Desaster"	4:12
12.	"Bestial Invasion"	6:49
Total length:		49:33
