= All Hell Breaks Loose (Destruction album) =

Studio album by Destruction
- Released: 25 April 2000
- Recorded: December 1999
- Studios: Abyss Studios, Pärlby, Sweden
- Genre: Thrash metal
- Length: 45:28
- Label: Nuclear Blast
- Producers: Peter Tägtgren, Destruction

Destruction chronology
The Least Successful Human Cannonball (1998)	All Hell Breaks Loose (2000)	The Antichrist (2001)

Professional ratings
Review scores
Source	Rating
Exclaim!	favorable
Rock Hard	9.5/10

All Hell Breaks Loose is the sixth studio album by German thrash metal band Destruction, released on 25 April 2000 by Nuclear Blast. It was their first official album since Cracked Brain in 1990, and the first with Marcel "Schmier" Schirmer returning to vocals and bass since Release from Agony in 1987. It also marks the return of the band to a three-piece lineup.

The album includes a cover of the Metallica song "Whiplash".

== Content ==
Although All Hell Breaks Loose is considered a return to thrash metal for the band, it retains some of the groove metal influences from their 1990s "Neo-Destruction" releases.

== Track listing ==
All tracks are written by Schirmer and Sifringer, except where noted.

No.	Title	Writer(s)	Length
1.	"Intro"		0:43
2.	"The Final Curtain"		4:26
3.	"Machinery of Lies"		3:42
4.	"Tears of Blood"		4:03
5.	"Devastation of Your Soul"		4:10
6.	"The Butcher Strikes Back"		3:08
7.	"World Domination of Pain"		4:05
8.	"X-Treme Measures"		4:54
9.	"All Hell Breaks Loose"		5:40
10.	"Total Desaster 2000"	Schirmer, Sifringer, Sandmann	3:07
11.	"Visual Prostitution"		3:51
12.	"Kingdom of Damnation"		3:37
13.	"Whiplash" (Metallica cover)	James Hetfield, Lars Ulrich	3:31
Total length:			45:28

Limited edition bonus disc: Bestial Invasion of Hell demo
No.	Title	Length
1.	"Mad Butcher"	3:43
2.	"Total Desaster"	3:27
3.	"Antichrist"	3:40
4.	"Front Beast"	1:55
5.	"Satan's Vengeance"	2:52
6.	"Tormentor"	4:12

Note

- "Whiplash" is a hidden bonus track on some copies of the record.

== Personnel ==
Writing, performance and production credits are adapted from the album's liner notes.

Destruction

- Schmier – bass, vocals
- Mike Sifringer – guitars
- Sven Vormann – drums

Guest musicians

- Peter Tägtgren – guitars, vocals on "Total Desaster 2000"

Production

- Peter Tägtgren – production, recording
- Destruction – production, recording

Artwork and design

- Joachim Luetke – cover artwork
- Dirk Gohr – layout
- Axel Jusseit – photography

== Charts ==
Chart (2000)	Peak position
German Albums (Offizielle Top 100)	67
