= Destruction (band) =

German thrash metal band

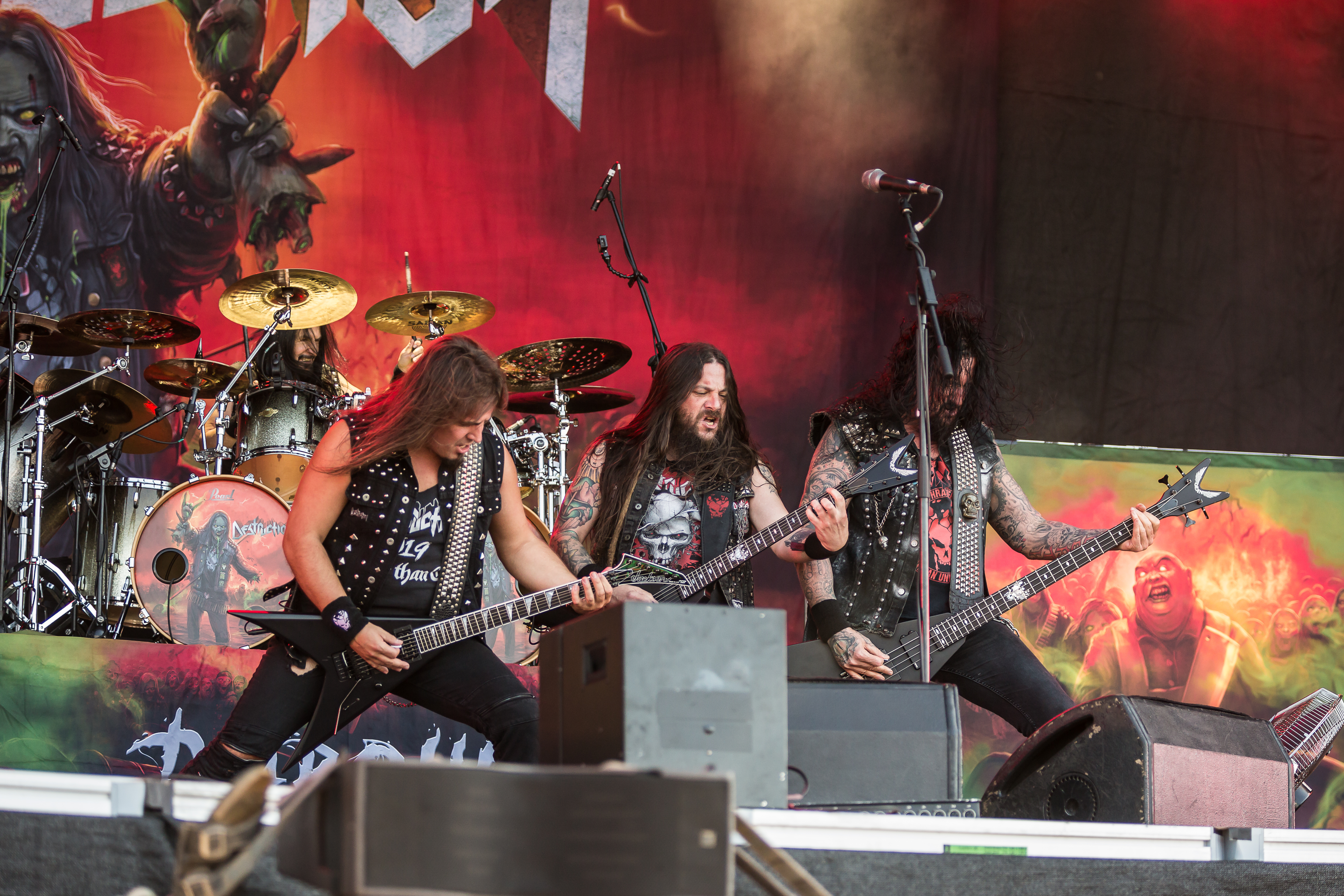
- Destruction in 2023

Background information
- Also known as: Knight of Demon (1982–1984)
- Origin: Weil am Rhein, Germany
- Genres: Thrash metal; black metal (early)
- Works: Discography
- Years active: 1982–present
- Labels: Profile; Steamhammer; Nuclear Blast; AFM; Napalm
- Members: Marcel "Schmier" Schirmer; Randy Black; Damir Eskic; Martin Furia
- Past members: Mike Sifringer; Ulf Kühne; Tommy Sandmann; Harry Wilkens; André Grieder; Oliver Kaiser; Thomas Rosenmerkel; Christian Engler; Michael Piranio; Sven Vormann; Marc Reign; Wawrzyniec Dramowicz
- Website: destruction.de

Destruction is a German thrash metal band formed in 1982. They have been credited as one of the "Big Four" of the German thrash metal scene, alongside Kreator, Sodom and Tankard.

In addition to pioneering black metal, Destruction was part of the second wave of thrash metal in the mid-to-late-1980s, along with US bands Testament, Sacred Reich, Death Angel and Dark Angel. Eduardo Rivadavia of AllMusic stated that the band "fell under the spell of the emergent New Wave of British Heavy Metal as classic metal met the D.I.Y. ethos of punk rock, then evolved into thrash metal."

For most of the 1990s, the band was not signed to a record label and self-produced their albums until they signed with Nuclear Blast in the early 2000s.

Destruction's early releases are considered thrash metal classics. Some journalists consider them to be among the greatest thrash metal bands of all time.

== History ==
The band was formed in Weil am Rhein as Knight of Demon in 1982, inspired by Iron Maiden, Mercyful Fate, Motörhead and Venom. The line-up featured singer Ulf Kühne, Mike Sifringer on guitar, bassist Marcel "Schmier" Schirmer, and drummer Tommy Sandmann. Kühne was fired due to personal conflicts with Sifringer, and Schirmer took over vocals. They were known as Destruction and released the demo Bestial Invasion of Hell on 10 August 1984. After this, the group signed with Steamhammer Records and released the EP Sentence of Death on 10 November.

Destruction's first studio album, Infernal Overkill, was released in 1985, followed a year later by Eternal Devastation. Second guitarist Harry Wilkens joined the band, and Sandmann was replaced by Oliver Kaiser. They recorded the EP Mad Butcher and their third studio album, Release from Agony (both released in 1987), as well as the band's first live album, Live Without Sense (1989). During this time, Destruction enjoyed worldwide popularity, touring Europe and North America, and sharing the stage with Venom, Slayer, Kreator, Sodom, Celtic Frost, Motörhead, King Diamond, Voivod, Exodus, Testament, Overkill, Death Angel, Possessed, Sacred Reich, The Cro-Mags, Tankard, Flotsam and Jetsam, Artillery, Rage, Coroner, Assassin, Candlemass, Prong, Accu§er, Iron Angel, Wolfsbane and Girlschool.

During the initial recording sessions of their fourth studio album, Cracked Brain, Schirmer was fired from the band and replaced by Poltergeist vocalist André Grieder, the only album with him. The album was released in 1990. Guitarist Mike Sifringer remained and continued to release material under the moniker of "Neo-Destruction", featuring vocalist Thomas Rosenmerkel, second guitarist Michael Piranio, bassist Christian Engler and drummer Oliver Kaiser. The first recording was the self-titled Destruction EP in 1994, followed a year later by the Them Not Me EP, and the band's fifth studio album, The Least Successful Human Cannonball, in 1998.

In 1999, the line-up was disassembled and Schirmer rejoined with the addition of drummer Sven Vormann, returning Destruction as a trio. They signed with Nuclear Blast and released three albums: All Hell Breaks Loose in 2000, The Antichrist in 2001, and Metal Discharge in 2003, with Marc Reign replacing Vormann. The second live album, Alive Devastation, was released on 26 March 2003, followed by the live DVD Live Discharge: 20 Years of Total Destruction on 4 March 2004. They appeared at the Wacken Open Air music festival in August of 2002. Reign was temporarily arrested on 24 May 2004 following the band's performance in Brescia, due to the stage accessories, which were confiscated as a result. Destruction signed with AFM Records and released Inventor of Evil on 22 August 2005. It was followed by the compilation album Thrash Anthems on 19 January 2007, featuring re-recorded material. They returned to Wacken in 2007. The next studio album, D.E.V.O.L.U.T.I.O.N., was released on 29 August 2008. The third live album, The Curse of the Antichrist: Live in Agony, was released 25 September 2009, followed by the second DVD release A Savage Symphony - The History of Annihilation on 29 January 2010.

Drummer Marc Reign left the band in 2010 and was replaced by Polish drummer Wawrzyniec "Vaaver" Dramowicz. On 18 February 2011, the eleventh studio album, Day of Reckoning, was released. The band's twelfth studio album, Spiritual Genocide, was released on 23 November 2012. Their next album, Under Attack, was released on 13 May 2016. Through an exclusive PledgeMusic campaign, Destruction released the sequel album to Thrash Anthems, Thrash Anthems II on 18 July 2017, featuring more re-recordings of classic songs.

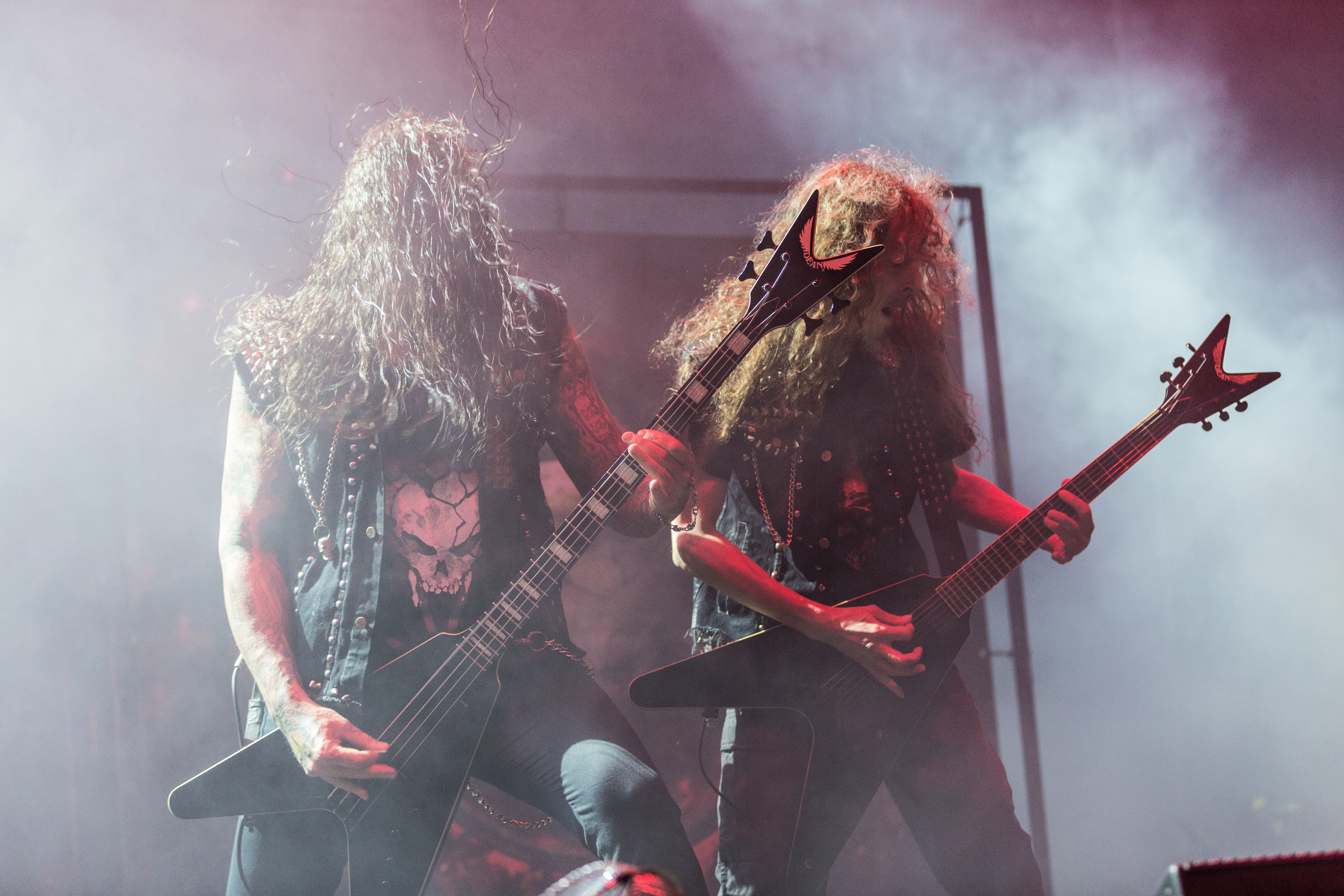
Destruction performing in 2017

On 23 January 2018, Vaaver left Destruction "for family reasons", according to Schirmer. He took time off in 2015 to be with his family following the birth of his second child. Randy Black temporarily replaced him until the band found a "worthy successor". He was later announced as the band's new drummer. On 28 February 2019, Swiss guitarist Damir Eskic joined the band. This line-up recorded the fourteenth studio album, Born to Perish, released on 9 August 2019. It is rooted in their traditional thrash metal and received good reviews. The fifth live album, Born to Thrash, was released on 8 May 2020.

On 16 July 2021, Destruction performed at the Area 53 Festival in Leoben without guitarist Mike Sifringer. Schirmer explained in a Facebook post that Sifringer had not answered his emails and questioned his status, and that there was a problem that led to the decision to continue without him, and would release a statement planned for 19 August. Sifringer's departure was confirmed that day, and he was replaced by Martin Furia, followed by the release of the single "State of Apathy", featuring the band's first recording with Furia. On 13 August, the sixth live album, Live Attack, was released. On 16 December, a music video for the title track from fourteenth studio album, Diabolical, was released. The album was released on 8 April 2022 to celebrate the band's 40th anniversary.

Destruction toured in 2023. On 31 July 2023, it was announced that Destruction (along with Kreator, Sodom and Tankard) were on the bill for the Klash of the Ruhrpott festival, which took place on 20 July 2024 at Amphitheater Gelsenkirchen in Gelsenkirchen, making it the first time that all of "Big Teutonic Four" bands performed together.

On 6 June 2024, the band released the single "No Kings - No Masters", in anticipation of their sixteenth studio album, Birth of Malice, released on 7 March 2025. The band supported the album with a world tour, which included a European leg with Testament, Obituary and Nervosa, and a U.S. tour with Testament and Overkill. The band performed at the Hell's Heroes music festival in Houston in March 2026. They also played Maryland Deathfest that year, playing material from Infernal Overkill.

== Band members ==
Current

- Marcel "Schmier" Schirmer – bass (1982–1989, 1999–present), lead vocals (1984–1989, 1999–present)
- Randy Black – drums (2018–present)
- Damir Eskic – guitars, backing vocals (2019–present)
- Martin Furia – guitars, backing vocals (2021–present)

Former

- Mike Sifringer – guitars (1982–1989, 1990–2021), guitars (1982–1987, 1999–2019), bass (1989–1993)
- Tommy Sandmann – drums (1982–1987)
- Ulf Kühne – vocals (1982–1984)
- Oliver "Olly" Kaiser – drums (1987–1999)
- Harry Wilkens – guitars (1987–1990)
- André Grieder – lead vocals (1989–1990)
- Thomas Rosenmerkel – vocals (1993–1999)
- Michael "Ano" Piranio – guitars (1993–1999, died in 2026)
- Christian Engler – bass (1993–1999)
- Sven Vormann – drums (1999–2001)
- Marc Reign – drums, backing vocals (2001–2010)
- Wawrzyniec "Vaaver" Dramowicz – drums, backing vocals (2010–2018)

== Discography ==
- Infernal Overkill (1985)
- Eternal Devastation (1986)
- Release from Agony (1987)
- Cracked Brain (1990)
- The Least Successful Human Cannonball (1998)
- All Hell Breaks Loose (2000)
- The Antichrist (2001)
- Metal Discharge (2003)
- Inventor of Evil (2005)
- D.E.V.O.L.U.T.I.O.N. (2008)
- Day of Reckoning (2011)
- Spiritual Genocide (2012)
- Under Attack (2016)
- Born to Perish (2019)
- Diabolical (2022)
- Birth of Malice (2025)
