= Spiritual Genocide =

Studio album by Destruction
- Released: 23 November 2012
- Recorded: 2012
- Genre: Thrash metal
- Length: 41:23
- Label: Nuclear Blast
- Producer: Destruction

Destruction chronology
Day of Reckoning (2011)	Spiritual Genocide (2012)	Under Attack (2016)

Professional ratings
Review scores
Source	Rating
About.com	3.5/5 stars
Blabbermouth.net	8.5/10
Metal Forces	9/10
Rock Hard	8/10

Spiritual Genocide is the twelfth studio album by German thrash metal band Destruction. It was released as a celebration of the band's 30th anniversary.

== Background ==
In August 2012, it was announced via Nuclear Blast website that Destruction had entered the studio to record their 13th album to celebrate their 30-year anniversary as a band.

Vocalist Marcel Schirmer commented:

"For this anniversary album we did a really great job, our new drummer "Vaaver" opens up new possibilities of course. On this album there are no limits. So fast, brutal and yet groovy we haven't ever sounded, probably! Also the guest musicians are very special this time: with Gerre (Tankard) and Tom Angelripper (Sodom) our old friends and companions are with us, the original Mad Butcher/Release from Agony – line up is doing one song and with OL Drake (Evile) we got the hottest young thrash guitarist for a few solos on the album!"

== Track listing ==
All songs written by Schmier and Sifringer, except track 12 (written by Biff Byford, Graham Oliver, Paul Quinn, Steven Dawnson and Peter Gill) and track 14 (written by Lemmy Kilmister, Eddie Clarke and Phil Taylor).

No.	Title	Length
1.	"Exordium" (instrumental)	1:03
2.	"Cyanide"	3:21
3.	"Spiritual Genocide"	3:39
4.	"Renegades"	3:55
5.	"City of Doom"	4:01
6.	"No Signs of Repentance"	3:24
7.	"To Dust You Will Decay"	4:21
8.	"Legacy of the Past"	4:50
9.	"Carnivore"	4:28
10.	"Riot Squad"	4:12
11.	"Under Violent Sledge"	4:09
Total length:		41:23

Limited edition bonus tracks
No.	Title	Length
12.	"Princess of the Night" (Saxon cover)	3:52
13.	"Carnivore" (guest version)	4:28
14.	"The Hammer" (Motörhead cover)	2:35
Total length:		10:55

== Credits ==
Writing, performance and production credits are adapted from the album liner notes.

=== Personnel ===
Destruction

- Schmier – bass, lead vocals
- Mike Sifringer – guitars
- Wawrzyniec "Vaaver" Dramowicz – drums, backing vocals

Guest musicians

- Tom Angelripper – vocals on "Legacy of The Past"
- Andreas "Gerre" Geremia (Tankard) – vocals on "Legacy of the Past"
- Harry Wilkens – guitar solo on "Spiritual Genocide", "No Signs of Repentance", "Carnivore"; guitar on "Carnivore" (guest version)
- OL Drake – guitar solo on "Renegades", "Legacy of the Past", "Princess of the Night"
- Oliver "Olly" Kaiser – drums on "Carnivore" (guest version)

Additional musicians

- Tommy Sandmann – backing vocals on "Spiritual Genocide", "City of Doom"
- Harry Wilkens – backing vocals on "Spiritual Genocide", "City of Doom"
- Oliver "Olly" Kaiser – backing vocals on "Spiritual Genocide", "City of Doom"
- Sven Vormann – backing vocals on "Spiritual Genocide", "City of Doom"
- V.O. Pulver – backing vocals on "Spiritual Genocide", "City of Doom"
- Inga Pulver – backing vocals on "Spiritual Genocide", "City of Doom"
- Matthias "Metti" Room (Perzonal War) – backing vocals
- Björn Kluth (Perzonal War) – backing vocals

Production

- Destruction – production
- Martin Buchwalter – recording (drums and vocals)
- Mike Sifringer – recording (guitars and bass)
- Andy Classen – mixing, mastering

Artwork and design

- Gyula Havancsák – cover art
- Kai Swillus – photography

=== Studios ===
- Gernhart Studios – recording (drums and vocals)
- Hail the Leaf Studio, Weil am Rhein, Germany – recording (guitars and bass)
- Stage One Studios – mixing, mastering
