= Inventor of Evil =

Studio album by Destruction
- Released: 22 August 2005
- Studios: House of Music Studios, Germany, Little Greek Studios, Switzerland
- Genre: Thrash metal
- Length: 50:27
- Label: AFM
- Producer: Destruction

Destruction chronology
Metal Discharge (2003)	Inventor of Evil (2005)	Thrash Anthems (2007)

Professional ratings
Review scores
Source	Rating
AllMusic	3.5/5 stars
Blabbermouth.net	7/10
Rock Hard	8/10

Inventor of Evil is the ninth studio album by German thrash metal band Destruction, released on August 22, 2005.

== Track listing ==
All tracks are written by Schmier and Sifringer.

No.	Title	Length
1.	"Soul Collector"	4:47
2.	"The Defiance Will Remain"	4:18
3.	"The Alliance of Hellhoundz"	5:20
4.	"No Mans Land"	4:31
5.	"The Calm Before the Storm"	4:59
6.	"The Chosen Ones"	5:05
7.	"Dealer of Hostility"	4:17
8.	"Under Surveillance"	3:39
9.	"Seeds of Hate"	6:12
10.	"Twist of Fate"	2:56
11.	"Killing Machine"	3:30
12.	"Memories of Nothingness"	1:01
Total length:		50:27

Digipak bonus tracks
No.	Title	Writer(s)	Length
13.	"We Are the Road Crew" (Motörhead cover)	Kilmister, Clarke, Taylor	2:28
14.	"The Alliance of Hellhoundz" (Schirmer vocals only)		5:20

Japanese edition bonus tracks
No.	Title	Length
13.	"Eternal Ban" (re-recorded)	3:11
14.	"The Alliance of Hellhoundz" (karaoke version)	5:20

== Credits ==
Writing, performance and production credits are adapted from the album's liner notes.

=== Personnel ===
Destruction

- Schmier – bass, lead vocals
- Mike Sifringer – guitars
- Marc Reign – drums, backing vocals

Guest musicians

- Biff Byford – vocals on "The Alliance of Hellhoundz"
- Messiah Marcolin – vocals on "The Alliance of Hellhoundz"
- Peavy Wagner – vocals on "The Alliance of Hellhoundz"
- Doro – vocals on "The Alliance of Hellhoundz"
- Mark Osegueda (Death Angel) – vocals on "The Alliance of Hellhoundz"
- Shagrath – vocals on "The Alliance of Hellhoundz"
- Paul Di'Anno – vocals on "The Alliance of Hellhoundz"
- Peter Tägtgren – vocals on "The Alliance of Hellhoundz"
- Björn "Speed" Strid – vocals on "The Alliance of Hellhoundz"
- Harry Wilkens – guitar solo on "The Alliance of Hellhoundz", "The Chosen Ones", "Seeds of Hate"
- Ferdy Doernberg – guitar solo on "The Alliance of Hellhoundz"
- V.O. Pulver – guitar solo on "The Alliance of Hellhoundz"

Additional musicians

- Messiah Marcolin – additional vocals on "Seeds of Hate"
- Inga Pulver – additional vocals on "Seeds of Hate", backing vocals
- Andre Grieder – additional vocals on "Seeds of Hate", backing vocals
- V.O. Pulver – backing vocals
- Franky Winkelmann – backing vocals
- "Ulle" Uhlmann – backing vocals
- Andy Brooks – backing vocals
- Harry Wilkens – backing vocals
- "Reimo" – backing vocals

Production

- Destruction – production
- Franky Winkelmann – recording, pre-production
- V.O. Pulver – recording
- Peter Tägtgren – recording, mixing
- Daniel "Longiz" – recording
- "Atilla" – recording (Paul Di'Anno vocals only)

Artwork and design

- Gyula Havancsak – cover art
- Katja Piolka – photography
- Dirk Schelpmeier – photography

=== Studios ===
- House of Music Studios, Germany – recording
- Little Creek Studio, Gelterkinden, Switzerland – recording
- Abyss Studios, Pärlby, Sweden – mixing
- Cutting Room, Stockholm, Sweden – mastering
