= The Least Successful Human Cannonball =

Studio album by Destruction
- Released: October 1998
- Recorded: Studio Tonfisch, Hauenstein, 1997
- Genre: Groove metal
- Length: 44:26
- Label: Brain Butcher
- Producer: Thomas Schnitzler

Destruction chronology
Them Not Me (1995)	The Least Successful Human Cannonball (1998)	All Hell Breaks Loose (2000)

The Least Successful Human Cannonball is the fifth studio album by the German thrash metal band Destruction, released in 1998 by Brain Butcher Compact. It was the final album made with Thomas Rosenmerkel on vocals, and the third and last release of the "Neo-Destruction" period of the band. Later on, all recordings made with Rosenmerkel were completely disowned by the band, and as such are no longer considered part of Destruction's official discography.

== Track listing ==
No.	Title	Length
1.	"Formless, Faceless, Nameless"	4:27
2.	"Tick on a Tree"	5:00
3.	"263 Dead Popes"	3:09
4.	"Cellar Soul"	5:47
5.	"God Gifted"	4:30
6.	"Autoaggression"	3:47
7.	"Hofffmannn's Helll"	4:44
8.	"Brother of Cain"	4:55
9.	"A Fake Transition"	1:33
10.	"Continental Drift I"	2:53
11.	"Continental Drift II"	3:41
Total length:		44:26

== Personnel ==
- Thomas Rosenmerkel – vocals
- Michael Piranio – lead guitar
- Mike Sifringer – rhythm guitar
- Christian Engler – bass
- Olly Kaiser – drums
