= Live Without Sense =

Live album by Destruction
- Released: 1 January 1989
- Recorded: Various concerts in Vienna in 1988
- Genre: Thrash metal
- Length: 53:03
- Label: Steamhammer/SPV

Destruction chronology
Release from Agony (1987)	Live Without Sense (1989)	Cracked Brain (1990)

Live Without Sense is the first live album by German thrash metal band Destruction. It was released on January 1, 1989.

== Track listing ==
No.	Title	Length
1.	"Curse the Gods"	5:46
2.	"Unconscious Ruins"	4:40
3.	"Thrash Attack"	3:03
4.	"Invincible Force"	4:13
5.	"Dissatisfied Existence"	4:10
6.	"Reject Emotions"	4:43
7.	"Eternal Ban"	6:29
8.	"Mad Butcher / Pink Panther"	6:30
9.	"Life without Sense / In the Mood"	7:31
10.	"Release from Agony"	4:52
11.	"Bestial Invasion"	5:26
Total length:		53:03

== Personnel ==
Destruction

- Schmier – bass, vocals
- Harry Wilkens – guitar
- Mike Sifringer – guitar
- Oliver "Olli" Kaiser – drums

Production

- Joachim Luetke – cover illustration
