= Destruction (EP) =

EP by Destruction
- Released: 26 February 1994
- Genre: Groove metal
- Length: 20:58
- Label: Brain Butcher

Destruction chronology
Cracked Brain (1990)	Destruction (1994)	Them Not Me (1995)

Destruction is an EP by the German thrash metal band Destruction, released on February 26, 1994.

It was the first release self-financed by Mike Sifringer on the Brain Butcher label after vocalist Marcel "Schmier" Schirmer's departure. The period of Brain Butcher releases is often called "Neo-Destruction". This album is the first of the three "Neo-Destruction" releases.

== Track listing ==
No.	Title	Length
1.	"Decisions"	3:55
2.	"I Kill Children"	4:40
3.	"Things of No Importance"	4:23
4.	"Smile"	5:06
5.	"Speaker"	2:54
Total length:		20:58

== Personnel ==
- Thomas Rosenmerkel – vocals
- Michael Piranio – lead guitar
- Mike Sifringer – rhythm guitar
- Christian Englern – bass
- Olly Kaiser – drums
