= Poltergeist (band) =

Swiss thrash metal band

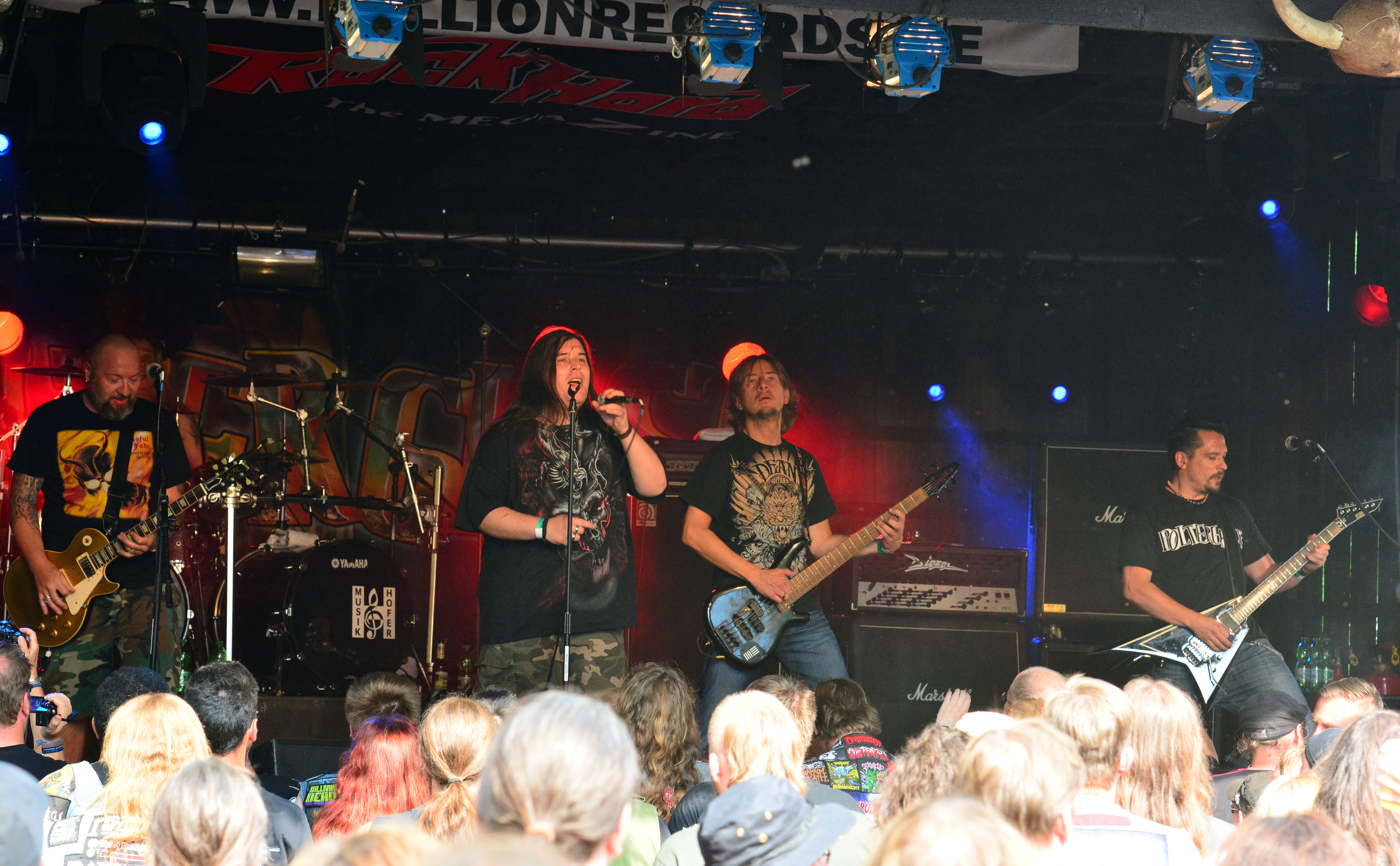
- Poltergeist performing in 2014

Background information
- Origin: Liestal, Switzerland
- Genre: Thrash metal
- Years active: 1985–1987 (Carrion); 1987–1993, 2013–present (Poltergeist)
- Labels: Pure Steel (current), Century Media, Haunted House, Srilanca (Carrion)

Poltergeist, originally Carrion, is a Swiss thrash metal band, active from 1985 to 1993, then again from 2013 to the present. Carrion produced two demos and one full-length album under SriLanca Records. Poltergeist released two full-length albums and three demos under Century Media Records. They also released a single and a full-length album under Haunted House Records. Poltergeist is now signed to Massacre Records and released the album Feather of Truth in 2020. The band is working on a new album as of August 2023.

== History ==
The band was founded in 1985 as Carrion by guitarist and vocalist V.O. Pulver. Carrion was not renamed to Poltergeist until the studio recording of Poltergeist's first demo in 1987. There had already been a UK rock band called Poltergeist which played at the now famous Watchfield Free Festival in 1975. Carrion was "underground" and was signed under Gama/Sri Lanca Records, a small record company in Germany. Carrion's appearance was heavily influenced by glam metal, which was popular at the time. After the name change to Poltergeist, the departure of three other band members, and the addition of new singer André Grieder, the band changed drastically in terms of appearance and style. Poltergeist gained a cult following after the release of their first two albums, but became more well known after singer André Grieder recorded vocals on the Cracked Brain album for the popular thrash metal band Destruction. Poltergeist's albums were critically viewed as "good, but not good enough to set them apart." and the band broke up following the release of their final album in 1993.

V.O. Pulver and Marek Felis formed the still-active groove/thrash metal band Gurd in 1994. Drummer Peter Haas played in the bands Mekong Delta, Babylon Sad, Calhoun Conquer, Krokus, Clockwork, Ain't Dead Yet, and Coroner. Former drummer Rolf Heer played for Braindead and Messiah. Former drummer Alex Lang played for the short-lived thrash band Cryonix.

At the end of 2013, Poltergeist announced their reunion. The line-up consisted of V.O. Pulver, André Grieder, Marek Felis, Chasper Wanner, and Sven Vormann. In 2016, Ralf Winzer Garcia, from the Swiss death metal band Requiem, joined as their new bassist following the departure of Marek Felis in April 2016. A few months later, on 30 August 2016, Poltergeist announced their upcoming album Back to Haunt would be released in October the same year through Pure Steel Records, and optimistically stated having a well developed sound and better songwriting compared to previous projects. Back to Haunt has been well received by critics, especially compared to previous projects, with praise particularly for the mature style change, musicianship, and originality of the second half of the album. However, the album was familiarly panned for not standing out amongst other bands and sounding uninspired and tired at times.

== Musical style ==
As Carrion, Evil Is There! had a raw and edgy sound, which included harsh and erratic drum beats and vocals, as well as catchy riffs from the guitars. With a lineup change and a new vocalist, the newly named Poltergeist's style began as a mix between power metal and thrash metal on their debut album Depression. They decided to focus on thrash metal in their second album Behind My Mask, which included more blast beats and less vocal cords. Their third album, Nothing Lasts Forever, included more technicality due to star drummer Peter Haas, as well as deeper and more prominent guitar and vocals.

== Members ==
=== Lineup ===
- V.O. Pulver – vocals (1985–1987), guitars (1985–1993, 2013–present)
- André Grieder – vocals (1987–1993, 2013–present)
- Chasper Wanner– guitar (2013–present)
- Sven Vormann – drums (2013–present)
- Ralf Winzer Garcia – bass (2016–present)

=== Former members ===
Guitar

- V.C. Andreatta (1985–1986)

Bass

- Graf (1988–1989)
- Thomas Steiner (1985–1987)
- Marek Felis (1991–1993, 2013–2016)

Drums

- Peter Haas (1993)
- Alex Lang (1991)
- Joel Bessière (1989–1991)
- Rolf Heer (1987–1989)
- Walter Schäfer (1985–1987)

== Discography ==
=== Studio albums ===
==== As Carrion ====
- Evil Is There! (1986)

==== As Poltergeist ====
- Depression (1989)
- Behind My Mask (1991)
- Nothing Lasts Forever (1993)
- Back to Haunt (2016)
- Feather of Truth (2020)

=== Demos ===
==== As Carrion ====
- Demo '85 (1985)
- Evil Is There! (1985)

==== As Poltergeist ====
- 1st Demo (1987)
- Writing on the Wall (1988)
- Promo–Demo '91 (1991)
- The Demos (Compilation) (2022)

=== Singles ===
- Tell Me / Nothing Lasts Forever (1992)
