= The Antichrist (album) =

Studio album by Destruction
- Released: 15 September 2001
- Recorded: April–May 2001
- Studio: Abyss Studios, Pärlby, Sweden
- Genre: Thrash metal
- Length: 42:17
- Label: Nuclear Blast
- Producer: Peter Tagtgren, Marcel Schirmer, Mike Sifringer

Destruction chronology
All Hell Breaks Loose (2000)	The Antichrist (2001)	Metal Discharge (2003)

Professional ratings
Review scores
Source	Rating
Exclaim!	favorable
Rock Hard	9/10

The Antichrist is the seventh album by German thrash metal band Destruction, released on September 15, 2001 through Nuclear Blast.

== Track listing ==
All tracks are written by Destruction.

No.	Title	Length
1.	"Days of Confusion"	0:49
2.	"Thrash till Death"	4:23
3.	"Nailed to the Cross"	3:46
4.	"Dictators of Cruelty"	4:31
5.	"Bullets from Hell"	5:06
6.	"Strangulated Pride"	3:27
7.	"Meet Your Destiny"	4:02
8.	"Creations of the Underworld"	3:54
9.	"Godfather of Slander"	4:09
10.	"Let Your Mind Rot"	4:15
11.	"The Heretic"	3:41
Total length:		42:17

Alternate track order
No.	Title	Length
1.	"Days of Confusion"	0:49
2.	"Dictators of Cruelty"	4:31
3.	"Thrash 'til Death"	4:23
4.	"Nailed to the Cross"	3:46
5.	"Bullets from Hell"	5:06
6.	"Strangulated Pride"	3:27
7.	"Meet Your Destiny"	4:02
8.	"Creations of the Underworld"	3:54
9.	"Godfather of Slander"	4:09
10.	"Let Your Mind Rot"	4:15
11.	"The Heretic"	3:41

Limited edition bonus track
No.	Title	Length
66.	"Curse the Gods" (re-recorded)	5:26
Total length:		47:49

- The limited edition has 66 tracks. Tracks 12 to 65 are blank tracks. On the re-release versions boxed with other Destruction albums on Nuclear Blast, the re-recorded version of "Curse The Gods" is at track 12.

== Credits ==
Writing, performance and production credits are adapted from the album liner notes.

=== Personnel ===
Destruction

- Schmier – bass, vocals
- Mike Sifringer – guitars
- Sven Vormann – drums

Additional musicians

- Peter Tägtgren – backing vocals

Production

- Peter Tägtgren – production, recording
- Marcel Schirmer – production
- Mike Sifringer – production
- Lars Szöke – recording
- Franky "The Master" – pre-production

Artwork and design

- Thomas Ewerhard – cover artwork, layout
- Fotostudio Trepzger – photography

=== Studios ===
- Abyss Studios, Pärlby, Ludvika, Sweden
- Cutting Room, Stockholm, Sweden

== Charts ==
Chart performance for The Antichrist
Chart (2001)	Peak position
German Albums (Offizielle Top 100)	89

Chart performance for The Antichrist
Chart (2026)	Peak position
Polish Albums (ZPAV)	53
