= Metal Discharge =

Studio album by Destruction
- Released: 22 September 2003
- Studio: Little Creek Studio, Gelterkinden, Switzerland
- Genre: Thrash metal
- Length: 39:12
- Label: Nuclear Blast
- Producer: Destruction, V.O. Pulver

Destruction chronology
The Antichrist (2001)	Metal Discharge (2003)	Inventor of Evil (2005)

Professional ratings
Review scores
Source	Rating
Allmusic	2/5 stars
Exclaim!	not favorable
Rock Hard	9.5/10

Metal Discharge is the eighth full-length album by German thrash metal band Destruction, released on September 22, 2003.

It was the first Destruction album to feature drummer Marc "Speedy" Reign of Morgoth.

== Track listing ==
All tracks are written by Schirmer and Sifringer, except where noted

No.	Title	Writer(s)	Length
1.	"The Ravenous Beast"		3:09
2.	"Metal Discharge"		3:26
3.	"Rippin' the Flesh Apart"		5:01
4.	"Fear of the Moment"		3:34
5.	"Mortal Remains"		4:11
6.	"Desecrators of the New Age"		3:42
7.	"Historical Force Feed"		3:36
8.	"Savage Symphony of Terror"		3:51
9.	"Made to Be Broken"	Destruction	3:45
10.	"Vendetta"		4:51
Total length:			39:12

Bonus disc
No.	Title	Length
1.	"Killers" (Iron Maiden cover)	4:52
2.	"Whiplash" (Metallica cover)	3:32
3.	"U.S.A." ("Fuck the U.S.A.", The Exploited cover)	3:08
4.	"Bestial Invasion" (Demo version 1999)	4:49
5.	"The Butcher Strikes Back" (Demo version 1999)	3:15
6.	"Nailed to the Cross" (Demo 2001)	3:48
7.	"Metal Discharge" (Demo 2003)	3:27
Total length:		26:51

== Personnel ==
Writing, performance and production credits are adapted from the album liner notes.

Destruction

- Schmier – bass, lead vocals
- Mike Sifringer – guitars
- Marc Reign – drums, backing vocals

Additional musicians

- V.O. Pulver – guitar solo on "The Ravenous Beast", backing vocals
- Andre Grieder – backing vocals
- Inga Pulver – backing vocals
- Franky Winkelmann – backing vocals
- "Tschibu" – backing vocals

Production

- V.O. Pulver – production, engineering, mixing, mastering
- Destruction – production
- Frank Winkelmann – engineering, mixing
