= Assassin (German band) =

German thrash metal band

Assassin is a thrash metal group from Düsseldorf, Germany. Founded in 1983, they notably released albums on Steamhammer Records and Massacre Records.

== Discography ==
=== Steamhammer ===
- The Upcoming Terror (1986)
- Interstellar Experience (1988)
- Breaking The Silence (2011)
- Combat Cathedral (2016)

=== AGD ===
- The Club (2005)

=== Massacre ===
- Bestia Immundis (2020)
- Skullblast (2024)
