= D.E.V.O.L.U.T.I.O.N. =

2008 studio album by Destruction

Studio album by Destruction
- Released: 29 August 2008
- Recorded: April–May 2008
- Studios: Hansen Studios in Ribe, Denmark
- Genre: Thrash metal
- Length: 48:03
- Labels: AFM, Candlelight
- Producers: Destruction, Jacob Hansen

Destruction chronology
Thrash Anthems (2007)	D.E.V.O.L.U.T.I.O.N. (2008)	Day of Reckoning (2011)

Professional ratings
Review scores
Source	Rating
About.com	4/5 stars
AllMusic	3.5/5 stars
Exclaim!	favorable
Metal Forces	8/10
Rock Hard	8/10

D.E.V.O.L.U.T.I.O.N. is the tenth studio album by German thrash metal band Destruction. The album was released on 29 August 2008 by AFM Records worldwide and Candlelight Records in the United States.

The album features three guitarists as guest appearances — Gary Holt of Exodus and Slayer and Jeff Waters of Annihilator, both playing solos in the song "Urge (The Greed of Gain)", in addition to Vinnie Moore from UFO.

All the first letters of each track on the record spell out the word "devolution".

== Track listing ==
All tracks are written by Sifringer and Schirmer, except track 11 written by Marc Brabbs, Peter Brabbs and Algy Ward.

No.	Title	Length
1.	"D.evolution"	5:29
2.	"E.levator to Hell"	5:38
3.	"V.icious Circle - The 7 Deadly Sins"	4:42
4.	"O.ffenders of the Throne"	4:16
5.	"L.ast Desperate Scream"	3:59
6.	"U.rge (The Greed of Gain)"	4:42
7.	"T.he Violation of Morality"	4:36
8.	"I.nner Indulgence"	4:46
9.	"O.dyssey of Frustration"	5:29
10.	"N.o One Shall Survive"	4:26
Total length:		48:03

Japanese edition bonus track
No.	Title	Length
11.	"Shellshock" (Tank cover)	2:15

== Personnel ==
Writing, performance and production credits are adapted from the album liner notes.

Destruction

- Schmier – bass, vocals
- Mike Sifringer – guitars
- Marc Reign – drums

Guest musicians

- Vinnie Moore – guitar solo on "D.evolution"
- Harry Wilkens – guitar solo on "E.levator to Hell"
- V.O. Pulver – guitar solo on "E.levator to Hell"
- Jacob Hansen – guitar solo on "L.ast Desperate Scream", "O.dyssey of Frustration"
- Gary Holt – guitar solo on "U.rge (The Greed of Gain)"
- Jeff Waters – guitar solo on "U.rge (The Greed of Gain)"
- Flemming C. Lund – guitar solo on "O.dyssey of Frustration"

Additional musicians

- Asbjörn Steffensen – backing vocals
- Jeppe S. Nielsen – backing vocals
- Torsten Madsen – backing vocals
- Kasper Kierkegaard – backing vocals
- Jan B. Jepsen – backing vocals
- Jacob Hansen – backing vocals
- Jeppe Andersson – backing vocals

Production

- Destruction – production
- Jacob Hansen – production, mixing, mastering
  - Jeppe Andersson – assisting engineering
- Martin Pagaard – drum tech

Artwork and design

- Gyula Havancsák – cover art
- Katja Piolka – photography (Schirmer only)
