= Day of Reckoning (Destruction album) =

Studio album by Destruction
- Released: 18 February 2011
- Recorded: 2010
- Genre: Thrash metal
- Length: 46:45
- Label: Nuclear Blast

Destruction chronology
D.E.V.O.L.U.T.I.O.N. (2008)	Day of Reckoning (2011)	Spiritual Genocide (2012)

Professional ratings
Review scores
Source	Rating
About.com	2.5/5 stars
AllMusic	4/5 stars
Exclaim!	favourable
PopMatters	8/10
Rock Hard	8/10

Day of Reckoning is the eleventh studio album by German thrash metal band Destruction. It was released on 18 February 2011 in Europe and 8 March 2011 in North America via Nuclear Blast. The first limited edition of the album does not have the band's logo on the booklet while the vinyl version and second pressing of the CD show a red Destruction logo on it.

This is the first album to feature their new drummer Vaaver. The first statements from the band are promising, for the oldschool fans, a more fast and turbulent album than the 2008 studio record D.E.V.O.L.U.T.I.O.N. that will go more 'back to the roots'. On 18 December 2010 in Portugal they played "Hate Is My Fuel" for the first time. Day of Reckoning sold over 800 copies in its first week in the U.S.

== Track listing ==
All songs written by Schmier and Sifringer, except track 12 written by Jimmy Bain and Ronnie James Dio.

No.	Title	Length
1.	"The Price"	3:39
2.	"Hate Is My Fuel"	4:24
3.	"Armageddonizer"	4:09
4.	"Devil's Advocate"	4:18
5.	"Day of Reckoning"	3:58
6.	"Sorcerer of Black Magic"	4:25
7.	"Misfit"	4:26
8.	"The Demon Is God"	5:11
9.	"Church of Disgust"	4:05
10.	"Destroyer or Creator"	3:09
11.	"Sheep of the Regime"	4:59
Total length:		46:45

Limited edition bonus tracks
No.	Title	Length
12.	"Stand Up and Shout" (Dio cover)
13.	"The Price" (demo)

== Personnel ==
Destruction

- Schmier – bass, vocals
- Mike Sifringer – guitars
- Wawrzyniec "Vaaver" Dramowicz – drums

== Charts ==
Chart (2011)	Peak position
German Albums (Offizielle Top 100)	95
