= Cracked Brain =

Studio album by Destruction
- Released: 1 May 1990
- Recorded: 1989–1990
- Studios: Union Studios, Munich; Sky Track, Berlin
- Genre: Thrash metal
- Length: 39:01
- Label: Noise Records
- Producers: Guy Bidmead and Destruction

Destruction chronology
Live Without Sense (1989)	Cracked Brain (1990)	Destruction EP (1994)

Cracked Brain is the fourth full-length studio album by German thrash metal band Destruction, released on May 1, 1990. It is the band's only album to feature André Grieder of Poltergeist, replacing Marcel "Schmier" Schirmer, who was fired after the initial sessions for the album. Also featured is a cover of The Knack song "My Sharona".

AllMusic gave the album two stars out of five.

== Recording and production ==
Recording for Cracked Brain first started in 1989 but came to a halt when Destruction fired their vocalist and bassist Schmier. Guitarist Mike Sifringer recalled, "We recorded the basic tracks – drums and riff-guitars – at Union-Studios in Munich, a very expensive place. But Schmier was not happy with the music anymore, so what to do? We had to stop the recording session and went back home, everybody was pissed. In hindsight I know we made a wrong decision, we didn't talk enough. We did not meet for years after the split."

On the album's recording process, Sifringer said, "To save a bit of money we recorded bass and vocals in Berlin at Sky Track. A funny bloke named Gerdy, that's all I remember, was behind the desk there. Finally, the producer Guy Bidmead, Oli, Harry and I mixed the whole thing back in Munich." Destruction began re-recording Cracked Brain shortly after hiring André Grieder of Poltergeist as Schmier's replacement. Drummer Oliver Kaiser recalled, "André had been a long-time friend of ours – and still is. We asked him if he would like to finish Cracked Brain with us because we liked his melodious approach to thrash, his style was a bit Testament-influenced you might say. We knew there would never be another Schmier so we thought it'd be better to go into a different direction with the vocals. André really did a great job on Cracked Brain." He added, "When André flew up to Berlin for the recording sessions, I had everything already laid out for him. I sang the songs to him and he nailed them just like that."

== Track listing ==
All songs by Sifringer, Wilkens and Kaiser, except track 5 written by Doug Fieger and Berton Averre

No.	Title	Length
1.	"Cracked Brain"	3:36
2.	"Frustrated"	3:32
3.	"S.E.D."	3:31
4.	"Time Must End"	5:56
5.	"My Sharona (The Knack cover)"	3:09
6.	"Rippin' You off Blind"	5:28
7.	"Die a Day Before You're Born"	4:20
8.	"No Need to Justify"	4:48
9.	"When Your Mind Was Free"	4:38
Total length:		39:01

== Personnel ==
Destruction

- André Grieder – vocals
- Harry Wilkens – lead guitar, bass
- Mike Sifringer – rhythm guitar, bass
- Oliver Kaiser – drums

Additional musician

- Christian Engler – additional bass

Production

- Andreas Marschall – cover art
- Guy Bidmead – production
