= Release from Agony =

Studio album by Destruction
- Released: 1 December 1987
- Recorded: September 1987
- Studios: Karo Studio, Münster, West Germany
- Genre: Thrash metal
- Length: 37:20
- Label: Steamhammer/SPV
- Producer: Kalle Trapp

Destruction chronology
Mad Butcher (1987)	Release from Agony (1987)	Live Without Sense (1989)

Professional ratings
Review scores
Source	Rating
AllMusic	4.5/5 stars
Rock Hard	9.0/10

Release from Agony is the third studio album by German thrash metal band Destruction, released on December 1, 1987 by Steamhammer/SPV in mainly Europe, and in 1988 by Profile/Rock Hotel Records in North America. This is the band’s first album recorded as a four-piece, and was their last studio album to feature bassist and lead vocalist Marcel "Schmier" Schirmer until he rejoined the band in 1999.

== Music ==
The music on Release from Agony is considered to be more technically advanced than its predecessor.

== Artwork ==
Joe DiVita of Loudwire said of the album's cover artwork: "Maybe those tubes are flooded with morphine and we just can’t see how relaxed and calm this demented figure actually is. It’s like Pablo Picasso delved into heavy metal artwork because none of the facial features are in their usual spots and with the headwrap at the top and eyes embedded in the hands, we don’t even want to know what’s under there." Simon Young of Metal Hammer wrote: "Is this a nightmare or a misinterpreted artistic brief? It's a hellish vision, sure, but one that says what exactly is fucking going on with this poor bastard's medical care? We didn't clap on our doorsteps every Thursday for this."

== Reception and legacy ==
John Book of AllMusic called the album "an overlooked classic," giving it four and a half stars out of five.

In 2023, Metal Hammer included the album cover on their list of "50 most hilariously ugly rock and metal album covers ever".

== Track listing ==
All tracks are written by Destruction.

No.	Title	Length
1.	"Beyond Eternity"	1:11
2.	"Release from Agony"	4:44
3.	"Dissatisfied Existence"	4:30
4.	"Sign of Fear"	6:46
5.	"Unconscious Ruins"	4:27
6.	"Incriminated"	5:22
7.	"Our Oppression"	4:49
8.	"Survive to Die"	5:31
Total length:		37:20

== Personnel ==
Destruction

- Marcel "Schmier" Schirmer – bass, vocals
- Harry Wilkens – guitar
- Mike Sifringer – guitar
- Oliver "Olli" Kaiser – drums

Production

- Kalle Trapp – production, recording, engineering, mixing
- Joachim Luetke – cover art
