= Thrash metal =

Subgenre of heavy metal

- Stylistic origins: NWOBHM; speed metal; hardcore punk
- Cultural origins: Early 1980s; United States; Germany; United Kingdom; Latin America
- Derivative forms: Beatdown hardcore; black metal; death metal; groove metal; tough guy hardcore

Fusion genres
- Blackened thrash metal; crossover thrash; deathrash; funk metal; metalcore

Regional scenes
- Australia; Brazil; Canada; Germany; Poland; United Kingdom; United States; California; New York

Local scenes
- Los Angeles; San Francisco Bay Area

Other topics
- Extreme metal; NWOAHM; thrashcore; Thrasher

Thrash metal (or simply thrash) is an extreme subgenre of heavy metal music characterized by its overall aggression and fast tempo. The songs usually use fast percussive beats and low-register guitar riffs, overlaid with shredding-style lead guitar work.

The genesis of the genre dates back to the 1970s when early heavy metal, hard rock and punk rock bands released songs that featured traits of what would eventually become thrash metal, speed metal, or both. The thrash metal genre was established from the early-to-mid-1980s, during which musicians began to fuse the double bass drumming and complex guitar stylings of the new wave of British heavy metal (NWOBHM) with the speed and aggression of skate punk, hardcore punk, and speed metal, and the technicality of progressive rock. Philosophically, thrash metal developed as a backlash against both the conservatism of the Reagan era and the much more moderate, pop-influenced, and widely accessible heavy metal subgenre of glam metal which also developed concurrently in the 1980s. Derived genres include crossover thrash, a fusion of thrash metal and hardcore punk.

The early thrash metal movement revolved around independent record labels, including Megaforce, Metal Blade, Combat, Roadrunner, and Noise, and the underground tape trading industry in both Europe and North America. The genre was commercially successful from approximately 1985 through 1991, bringing prominence to Metallica, Slayer, Megadeth, and Anthrax, all grouped together as the "Big Four" of U.S. thrash metal. Other bands, such as Overkill, Metal Church, Nuclear Assault, Flotsam and Jetsam, and Bay Area acts Exodus, Testament and Death Angel, never achieved the same level of success as the "Big Four" but had also developed a strong following in the metal community, through MTV's Headbangers Ball or otherwise. Some of the most popular international thrash metal bands from this era were Brazil's Sepultura, Canada's Voivod and Annihilator, Switzerland's Coroner, England's Onslaught, and the genre's German "Big Teutonic Four": Kreator, Destruction, Sodom, and Tankard.

The thrash metal genre had declined in popularity by the mid-1990s, due to the commercial success of numerous genres such as alternative rock and grunge. In response, some bands had either disbanded or moved away from their thrash metal roots and more towards influences such as punk (or crossover thrash), progressive, groove metal, or alternative metal, and later industrial or nu metal. The genre has seen a resurgence in popularity since the late 1990s/early 2000s, with the arrival of various bands such as Bonded by Blood, Evile, Hatchet, Havok, Lamb of God, Municipal Waste, and Warbringer, who have all been credited for leading the so-called "thrash metal revival" scene.

== Characteristics ==
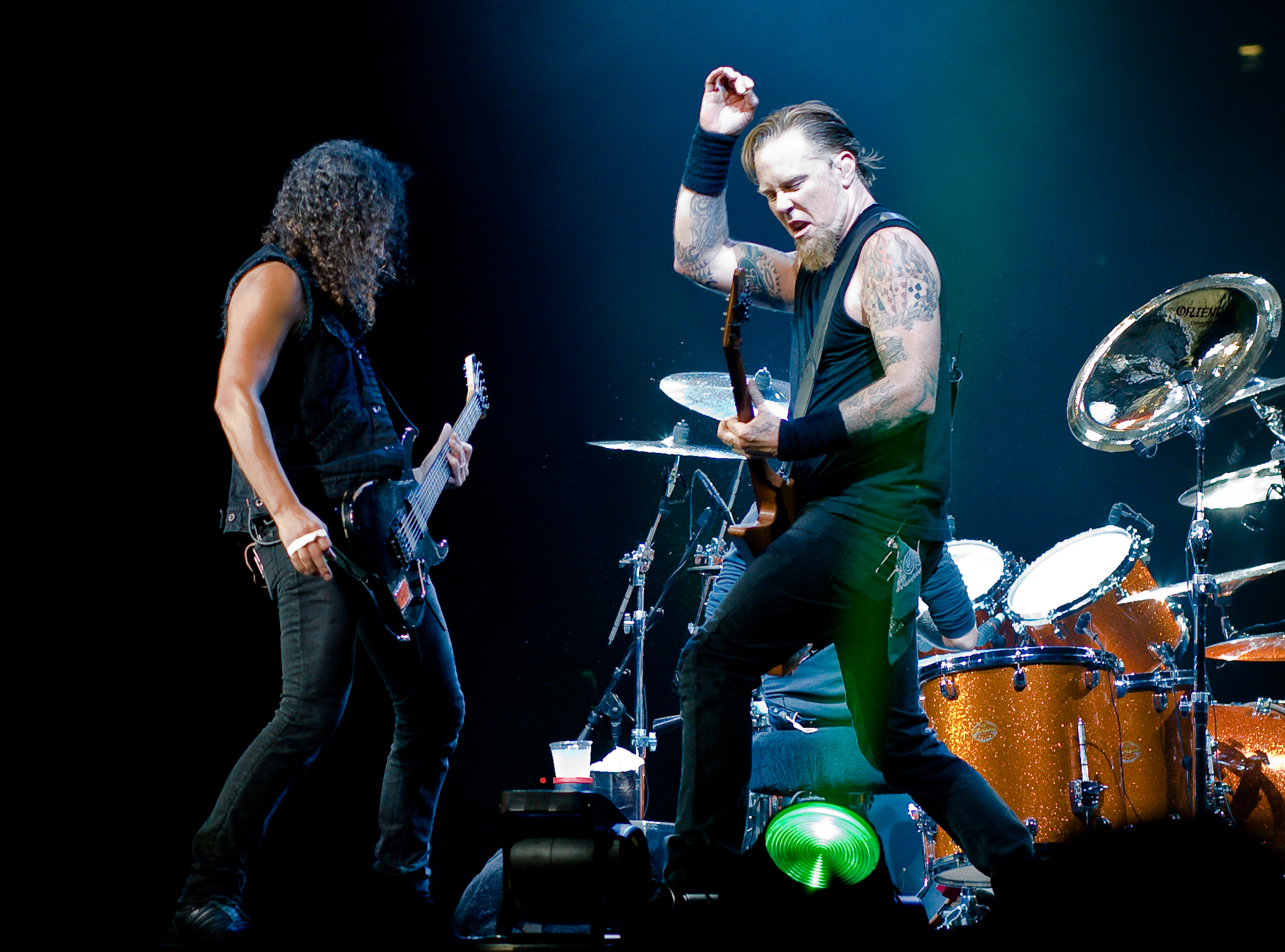
Kirk Hammett and James Hetfield of Metallica (pictured in 2008). Metallica's early work is regarded as essential to the development of the thrash metal genre in the 1980s.

Thrash metal generally features fast tempos, low-register, complex guitar riffs, high-register guitar solos, and double bass drumming. The rhythm guitar parts are played with heavy distortion, power chords and often palm muted to create a tighter and more precise sound. Vocally, thrash metal can employ anything from melodic singing to shouted or screamed vocals. Most guitar solos are played at high speed and technically demanding, as they are usually characterized by shredding, and use advanced techniques such as sweep picking, legato phrasing, alternate picking, tremolo picking, string skipping, and two-hand tapping.

David Ellefson, the original bassist of Megadeth, described thrash metal as "a combination of the attitude from punk rock but the riffs and complexities of traditional metal." On the origins of thrash metal, Dan Lilker (bassist and co-founding member of Anthrax, S.O.D. and Nuclear Assault) recalls: "Thrash was just what they called 'faster hardcore,' because you literally thrashed around when you were either playing it or reacting to it. And thrash metal was born because it was influenced by thrash hardcore, and they just thought it was more metal, so they said, 'Okay, this is thrash metal.'"

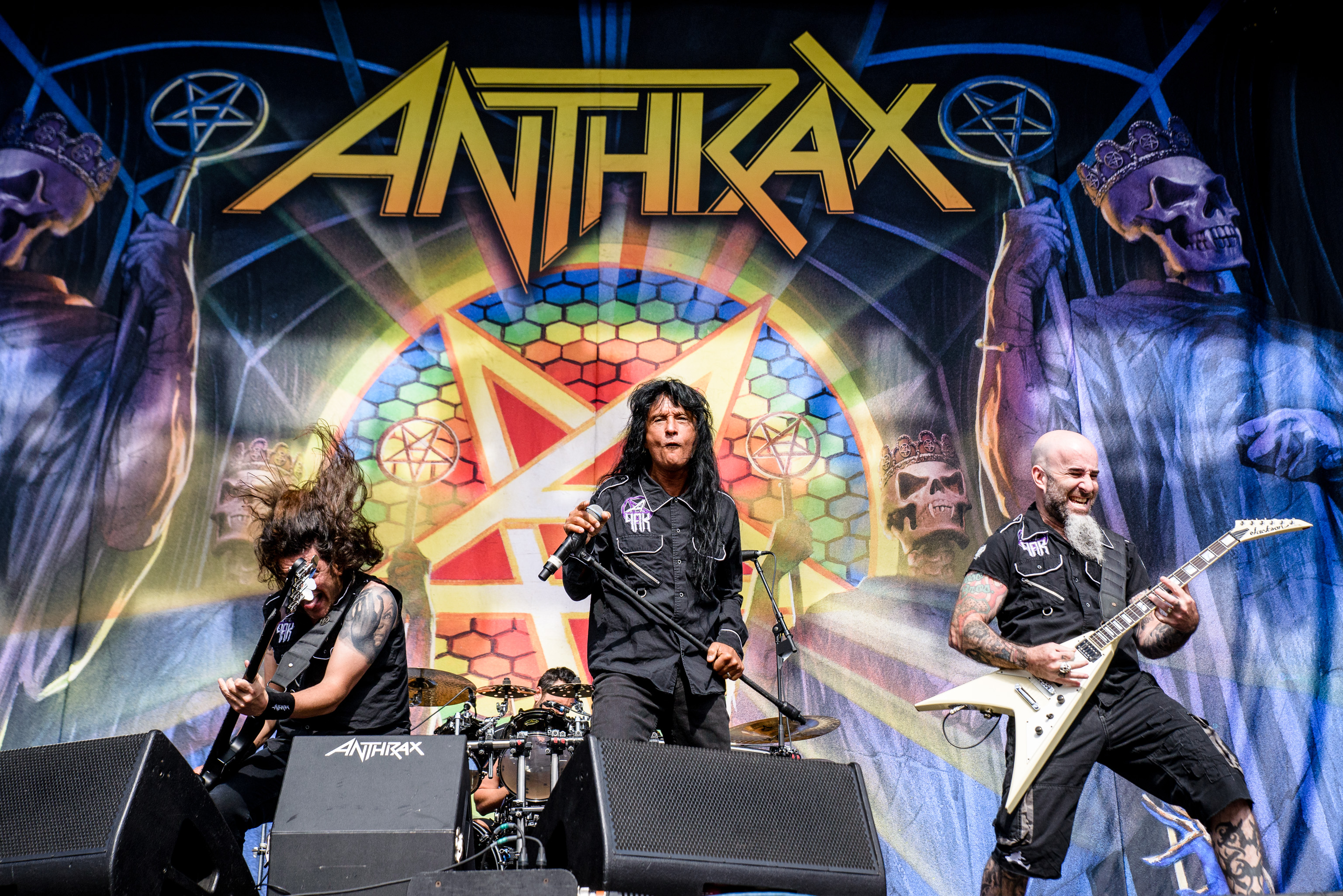
New York band Anthrax was among the earliest and most successful thrash acts.

The guitar riffs often use chromatic scales and emphasize the tritone and diminished intervals, instead of using conventional single-scale-based riffing. For example, the intro riff of Metallica's "Master of Puppets" (the title track of the namesake album) is a chromatic descent, followed by an ascent based on the tritone.

Cymbal stops/chokes are often used to transition from one riff to another or to precede an acceleration in tempo.

To keep up with the other instruments, many bassists use a plectrum (pick). However, some prominent thrash metal bassists have used their fingers, most notably Frank Bello, Greg Christian, Steve Di Giorgio, Robert Trujillo, and Cliff Burton. Several bassists use a distorted bass tone, an approach popularized by Burton and Motörhead's Lemmy. Lyrical themes in thrash metal include warfare, corruption, injustice, murder, suicide, isolation, alienation, addiction, and other maladies that afflict the individual and society. In addition, politics, particularly pessimism and dissatisfaction towards politics, are common themes among thrash metal bands. Humor and irony can occasionally be found (Anthrax for example), but they are limited, and are an exception rather than a rule.

== Etymology ==
The term "thrash" originated as a way of referring to hardcore punk, as shown on the 1982 hardcore compilation album New York Thrash. By 1983, the term "thrash metal" had entered colloquial use as a way to denote the fusion of hardcore and metal. The 1983 debut issue of Metal Forces used the term to describe the bands on the first Metal Massacre and Mike Varney's first three U.S. Metal compilation albums. Later the same year, the thirteenth issue of Metal Mania used the term in an article, saying it was used synonymously with "heavy thrash" and "punk metal", going on to say acts in the genre included Tank, Metallica, MDC, GBH, Discharge and Crucifix. The term is sometimes incorrectly credited to a 1984 Kerrang! magazine article by journalist Malcolm Dome, who used the term in reference to the song "Metal Thrashing Mad" by Anthrax.

Around 1984, the most dominant name for what is now defined as thrash metal was "power metal", a name which eventually evolved to refer to the separate power metal genre. Similarly, for much of the 1980s, the names "thrash metal" and "speed metal" were generally used synonymously. The separate speed metal genre was defined retrospectively in the 1990s, to refer to 1980s bands who bridged the gap between thrash metal and power metal.

== History ==
=== Roots (1970s – early 1980s) ===
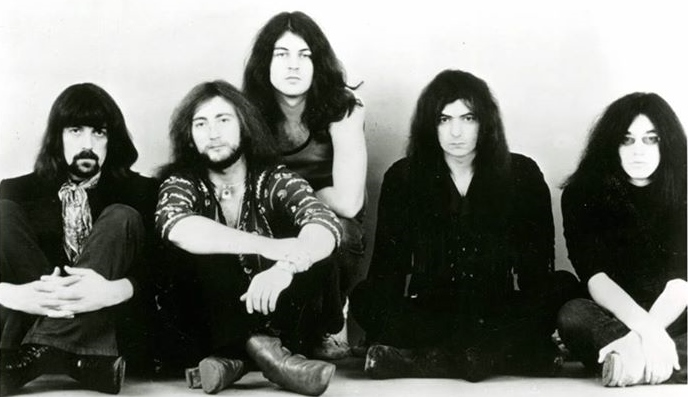
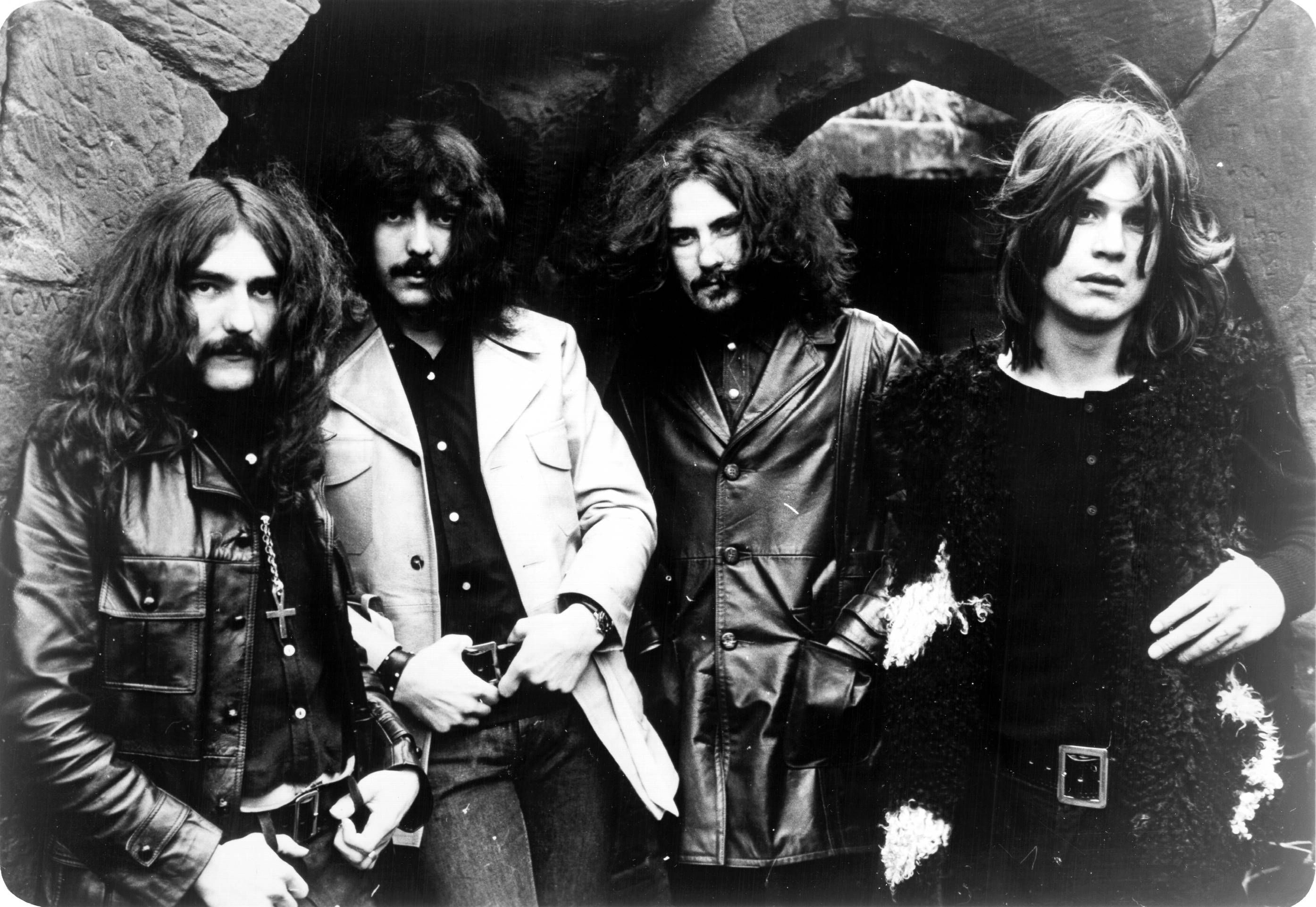
The genesis of thrash metal began in the early 1970s with the British music scene, including bands like Deep Purple (above) and Black Sabbath that introduced the sound of "proto-thrash" in their respective works, predating the beginnings of the punk and new wave of British heavy metal (NWOBHM) scenes.

The term "proto-thrash" has been used to describe bands as having elements of speed metal or thrash metal before those genres came to prominence in the early-to-mid-1980s. Deep Purple's 1970 album Deep Purple in Rock is perhaps the earliest proto-thrash/speed metal album, as music journalist Martin Popoff noted, "It's really about the discipline and classical haughtiness of this record, as well as 'Hard Lovin' Man' which is a great contender for first proto-thrash song ever." Blue Öyster Cult's second album Tyranny and Mutation (1973) has also been proclaimed as one of the earliest examples of proto-speed/thrash metal, with Scott Morrow of RIP Magazine writing, "Along with albums by such pioneers as Led Zeppelin, Mountain, Deep Purple, Blue Cheer, and Black Sabbath, some of the earliest speed metal sounds can be heard on Blue Öyster Cult's masterpiece Tyranny and Mutation. With its screamin' stun guitars, growling vocals, maniacal tempos and overall bad-dude attitude, B.Ö.C. set a precedent in the still-young metal arena. This, however, was only a glimpse of future mayhem."

Other works described as proto-thrash/speed metal include Queen's 1974 song "Stone Cold Crazy", Kiss' 1974 song "Parasite", Black Sabbath's 1975 song "Symptom of the Universe", Diamond Head's 1980 song "Am I Evil?", and at least two tracks from the Ronnie James Dio-era of Rainbow: "A Light in the Black" from their 1976 album Rising and "Kill the King" from the 1978 follow-up Long Live Rock 'n' Roll. The new wave of British heavy metal (NWOBHM) bands emerging from Britain in the late 1970s further influenced the development of early thrash. The early work of artists such as Diamond Head, Iron Maiden, Venom, Motörhead, Tygers of Pan Tang, Raven, Saxon and Angel Witch, among others, introduced the fast-paced and intricate musicianship that became core aspects of thrash. Phil Taylor's double-bass drumming featured in Motörhead's 1979 song "Overkill" has been acknowledged by many thrash drummers, most notably Lars Ulrich, as a primary influence on their playing. Thrash metal bands have also taken inspiration from Judas Priest, with Slayer guitarist Kerry King saying that, "There would be no Slayer without Priest." Metal Blade Records executive Brian Slagel played a key role in bringing the NWOBHM to a larger audience, as he was responsible for discovering both Metallica and Slayer and producing their earliest studio recordings.

Greg Prato of Ultimate Guitar notes, "Although the thrash movement seemed to have much more in common with punk than prog fashion-wise (leather jackets vs. capes), musically, there were certainly moments when thrash leaned more towards the prog side of things." Canadian progressive rock band Rush, for example, has been cited a formative influence on the thrash metal movement. In a 2013 interview with Rolling Stone, Anthrax drummer Charlie Benante said: "When I was first learning to play drums, I would strap on my headphones, play along with [Rush's live album All the World's a Stage] and be transformed. I remember talking with Cliff and Kirk back when we first met, and we all agreed how much of an influence Rush was on all of us."

The thrash metal genre is also strongly influenced by punk rock, drawing inspiration from sources ranging from traditional punk bands from the 1970s, including the New York Dolls, the Ramones, the Sex Pistols and the Dead Boys, to late 1970s/early 1980s hardcore punk bands Discharge, GBH, Black Flag, the Misfits, the Dead Kennedys, and Bad Brains. The Ramones' 1976 self-titled debut album in particular has been noted as a key influence on the genre, due to its sound, which introduced the three-chord thrash style of guitar. Void has been credited as one of the earliest examples of hardcore/heavy metal crossover, whose chaotic musical approach is often cited as particularly influential. Their 1982 split LP with fellow Washington band The Faith showed both bands exhibiting quick, fiery, high-speed punk rock. It has been argued that those recordings laid the foundation for early thrash metal, at least in terms of selected tempos, and that thrash is essentially hardcore punk with the technical proficiency missing from that genre. The crossover with hardcore punk has also been cited as important influence on thrash, especially the English hardcore punk band Discharge, whose "influence on heavy metal is incalculable and metal superstars such as Metallica, Anthrax, Machine Head, Sepultura, Soulfly, Prong and Arch Enemy have covered Discharge's songs in tribute." The eponymous debut albums by D.R.I. and Suicidal Tendencies, both released in 1983, have been credited for paving the way for thrashcore.

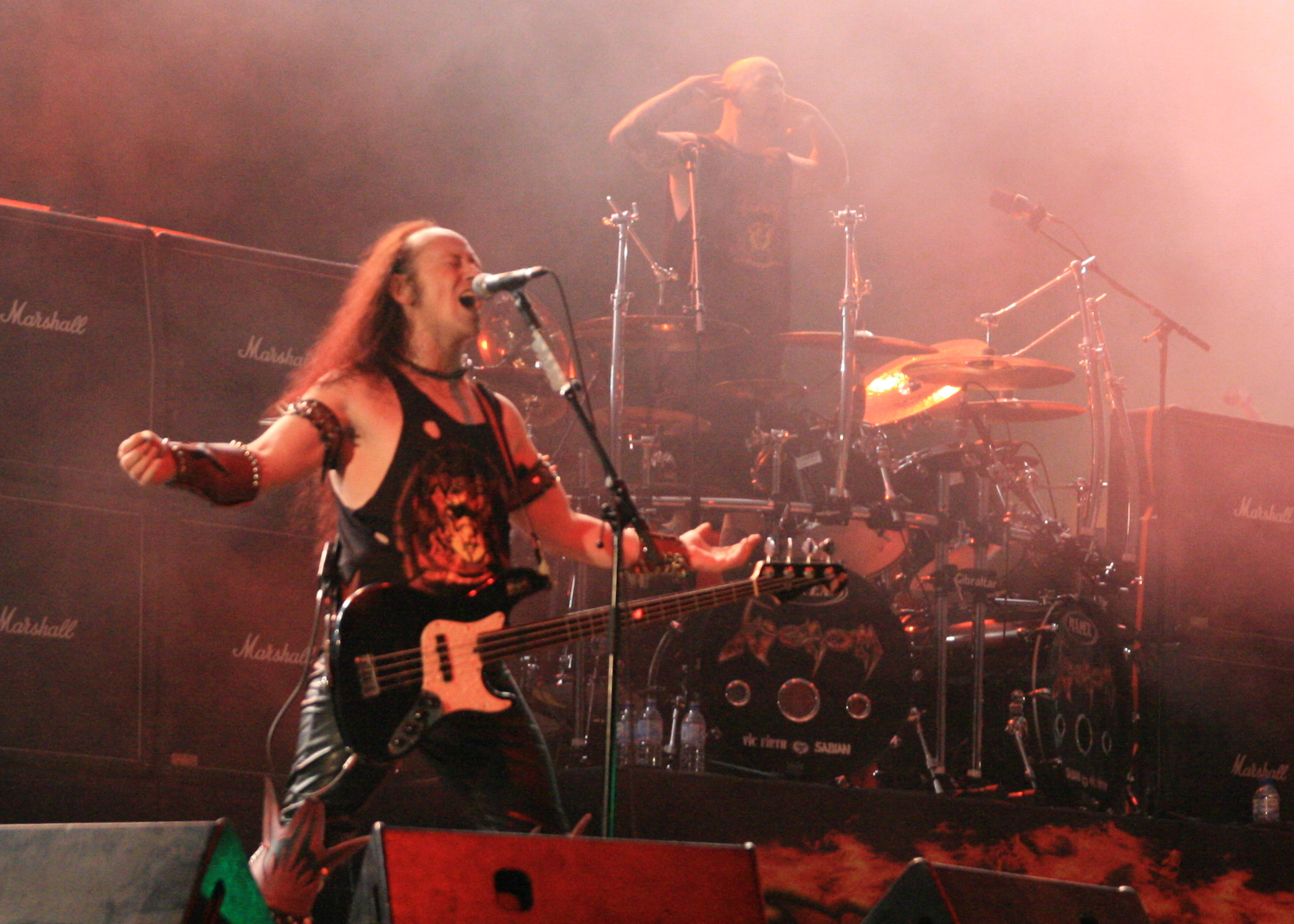
Venom's early work is considered a major influence on thrash metal.

In Europe, the earliest band of the emerging thrash movement was Venom from Newcastle upon Tyne, formed in 1978. Their 1982 album Black Metal has been cited as a major influence on many subsequent genres and bands in the extreme metal world, such as Bathory, Hellhammer, Slayer and Mayhem. The European scene was almost exclusively influenced by the most aggressive music Germany and England were producing at the time. British bands such as Tank and Raven, along with German bands Accept (whose 1982 song "Fast as a Shark" is often credited as one of the first-ever thrash/speed metal songs) and Living Death, motivated musicians from central Europe to start bands of their own, eventually producing groups such as Sodom, Kreator and Destruction from Germany, as well as Switzerland's Celtic Frost (formed by two-thirds of Hellhammer), Coroner and Carrion (who later became Poltergeist) and Denmark's Artillery.

=== Thrash metal in the 1980s ===
==== Birth and underground expansion (1980–1983) ====
Critics argue over who can be thought of as the first thrash metal band to exist. Most credit either British band Venom or the genre's so-called "Big Four": Metallica, Slayer, Anthrax, and Megadeth, with commentators crediting Venom as the first thrash metal band and others tending to favor the "Big Four", though many give equal credit to all those five bands. The origins of thrash metal have also been traced to San Francisco Bay Area band Exodus, who formed in 1979 and is the fifth band in what is sometimes considered the "Big Five". The band released its first demo in 1982, simply titled Demo 1982, which was widely circulated in the tape trading community and is credited for paving the way for the 1980s Bay Area thrash metal scene. A few commentators argue for other bands, including Overkill and Metal Church (both of whom formed in 1980), as the earliest bands to play thrash metal before releasing albums.

In 1981, Los Angeles band Leather Charm wrote a song entitled "Hit the Lights". Leather Charm soon disbanded and the band's primary songwriter, vocalist/rhythm guitarist James Hetfield, met drummer Lars Ulrich through a classified advertisement. Together, Hetfield and Ulrich formed Metallica, one of the "Big Four" thrash bands, with lead guitarist Dave Mustaine, who would later form Megadeth, another of the "Big Four" originators of thrash, and bassist Ron McGovney. McGovney would be replaced by Cliff Burton (formerly of Trauma), and Mustaine was later replaced by Kirk Hammett of the then-unsigned Exodus, and at Burton's insistence, the band relocated to the San Francisco Bay Area. Before Metallica had even settled on a definitive lineup, Metal Blade Records executive Brian Slagel asked Hetfield and Ulrich (credited as "Mettallica") to record "Hit the Lights" for the first edition of his Metal Massacre compilation in 1982. A re-recorded version of "Hit the Lights" would later open their first studio album, Kill 'Em All, released in July 1983. Kill 'Em All is widely regarded as the first thrash metal album, and "Whiplash" from the album has been referred to as one of the first songs of the genre.

Another "Big Four" thrash band formed in Los Angeles in 1981, when guitarists Jeff Hanneman and Kerry King met while auditioning for the same band and subsequently decided to form a band of their own. Hanneman and King recruited vocalist/bassist Tom Araya and drummer Dave Lombardo, and Slayer was formed. Slayer was discovered by Metal Blade Records executive Brian Slagel, and they contributed "Aggressive Perfector" to Slagel's Metal Massacre III. In December 1983, five months after the release of Metallica's debut Kill 'Em All, Slayer released their debut album, Show No Mercy.

To the north, Canada produced influential thrash and speed metal bands such as Annihilator, Anvil, Exciter, Razor, Sacrifice, and Voivod.

==== Mainstream popularity (1984–1989) ====
===== First wave (1984–1986) =====
The popularity of thrash metal increased in 1984 with the release of Metallica's sophomore record Ride the Lightning, as well as Anthrax's debut Fistful of Metal and Metal Church's eponymous debut album. Slayer and Overkill released extended plays on independent labels during this era, Haunting the Chapel and Overkill respectively. This led to a heavier-sounding form of thrash, which was reflected in Exodus' debut album Bonded by Blood, Slayer's Hell Awaits and Anthrax's Spreading the Disease, all three released in 1985. Several other debut albums were released that same year, including Megadeth's Killing Is My Business... and Business Is Good!, Overkill's Feel the Fire, Kreator's Endless Pain, Destruction's Infernal Overkill, Possessed's Seven Churches, Celtic Frost's To Mega Therion, Watchtower's Energetic Disassembly and the Sepultura EP Bestial Devastation. Seven Churches and To Mega Therion are often credited for pioneering and popularizing the mid-1980s extreme metal scene (as well as the then-developing genres of death metal and black metal, respectively), while Energetic Disassembly has been cited as the first technical thrash metal album, and as "the recording most responsible for the development of the progressive metal genre".

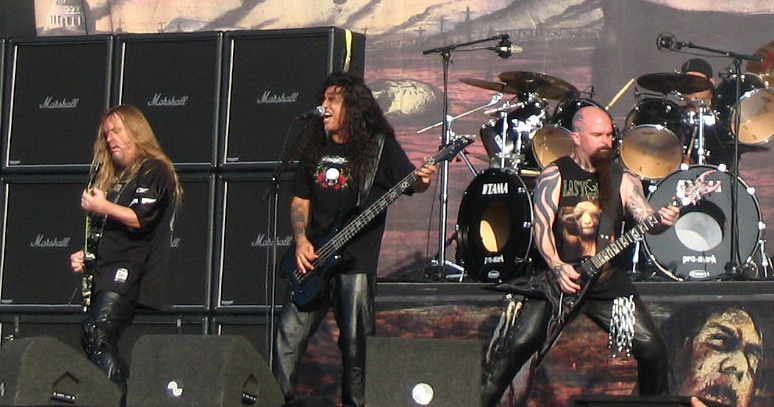
Slayer released Reign in Blood in 1986, considered a landmark achievement in the genre's history.

1986 was an important year in the history of thrash metal, as a number of critically acclaimed and genre-defining albums were released (including those by three of the "Big Four"; Anthrax was the only one of the four who did not release a new album that year). Metallica's major label debut Master of Puppets was released in March, becoming the first thrash album to be certified platinum, being certified 6× platinum by the Recording Industry Association of America (RIAA); it would be the band's last album to feature bassist Cliff Burton, who was killed in a bus accident six months after its release. Kreator released Pleasure to Kill in April 1986, which would later be a major influence on the death metal scene. Following this was Destruction's second album Eternal Devastation, and debut albums by other German thrash metal bands were released in 1986, including Exumer's Possessed by Fire, Holy Moses' Queen of Siam, Sodom's Obsessed by Cruelty and Tankard's Zombie Attack. Megadeth released Peace Sells... but Who's Buying? in September, an album which proved to be the band's commercial and critical breakthrough and which AllMusic later cited as "a classic of early thrash". Slayer, regarded as one of the most sinister thrash metal bands of the early 1980s, released Reign in Blood in October, an album considered by some to have single-handedly inspired the death metal genre. Also in October, Nuclear Assault released their debut album Game Over, followed a month later by Sepultura's debut album Morbid Visions and Dark Angel's Darkness Descends, the latter of which marked the debut of drummer Gene Hoglan. Flotsam and Jetsam's debut album Doomsday for the Deceiver (released on the Fourth of July in 1986) received some attention as well, due to the album being "the first of only a handful" to ever receive a 6K rating from Kerrang! magazine, and it is also notable for featuring a then-unknown Jason Newsted, who, not long after the album's release, joined Metallica as Burton's replacement.

Also during the mid-to-late 1980s, bands such as Suicidal Tendencies, D.R.I., S.O.D. (who featured three-fifths of Anthrax), and Corrosion of Conformity paved the way to what became known as crossover thrash, a fusion genre that lies on a continuum between heavy metal and hardcore punk, and is arguably faster and more aggressive than thrash metal.

===== Second wave (1987–1989) =====
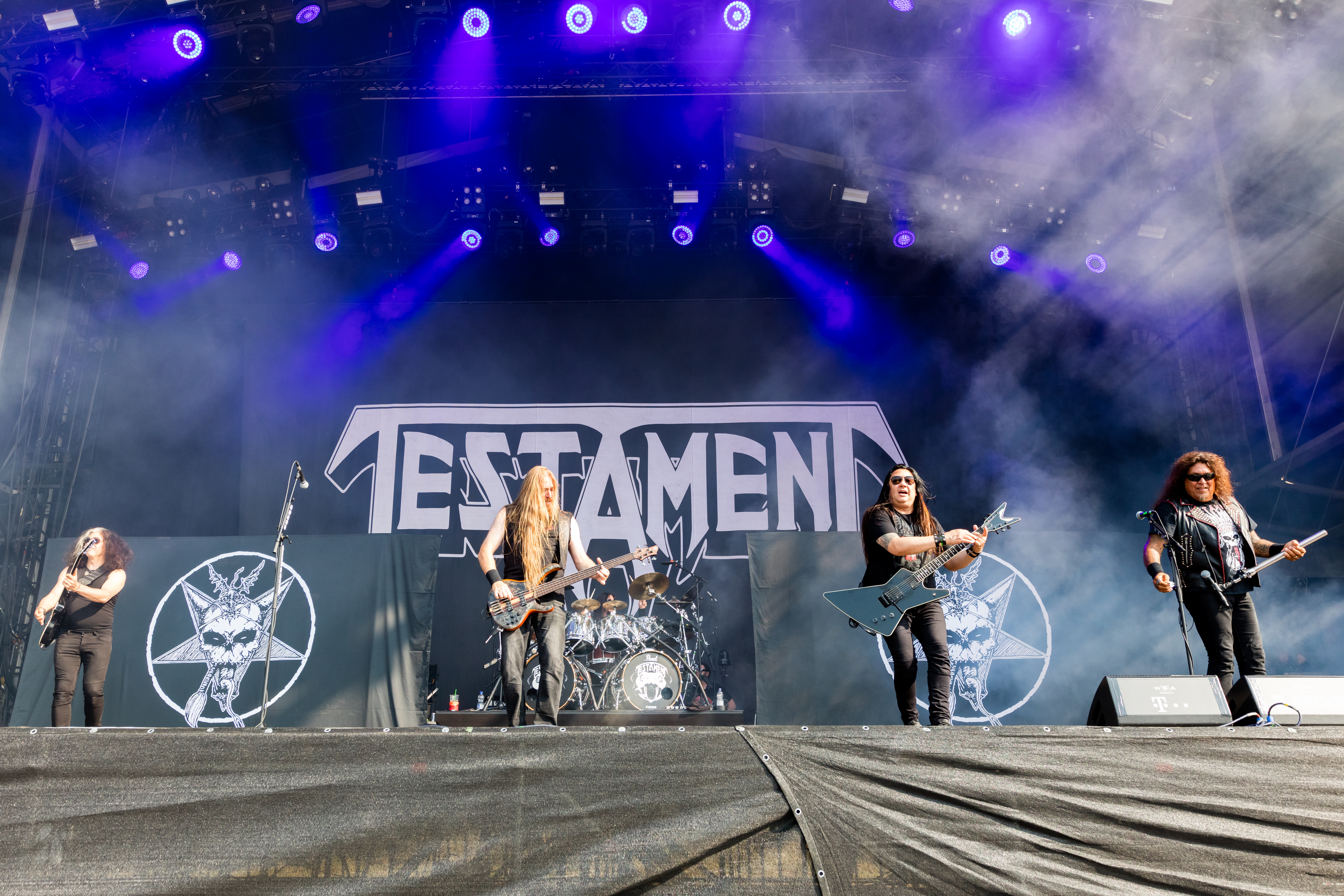
Testament was one of the most successful Bay Area thrash metal bands of the late 1980s.

By the mid-to-late 1980s, thrash metal began to achieve major mainstream success worldwide, with many bands of the genre receiving heavy rotation on MTV's Headbangers Ball, and radio stations such as KNAC in Long Beach and Z Rock in Dallas, as well as coverage on numerous publications, including Kerrang! and RIP Magazine. These outlets not only played a major role in the crossover success of thrash metal during this time, but helped push album sales of the genre's "Big Four" and similar bands or moved them from playing clubs to arenas and stadiums.

Thrash metal's popularity continued to expand in 1987, with Anthrax releasing their third album Among the Living and Metallica releasing the covers EP The $5.98 E.P. – Garage Days Re-Revisited. Among the Living borrowed elements from Anthrax's two previous releases, with fast guitar riffs and pounding drums, and proved popular enough that it became one of their first gold-certified albums, and warranted them a place in the "Big Four" with Metallica, Slayer and Megadeth. The $5.98 E.P. – Garage Days Re-Revisited, which was Metallica's first release with Jason Newsted replacing Cliff Burton and the follow-up to the original Garage Days Revisited EP, includes covers of late 1970s/early 1980s songs by new wave of British heavy metal and punk bands, and the addition of The $5.98 E.P. in its title was to ensure that retailers did not overcharge fans. Following this was the Anthrax EP I'm the Man, to which its comedy/novelty title track is often recognized as one of the first rap metal songs, and parodies the style of the Beastie Boys, while its main guitar riff is based on the melody of the Jewish folk song "Hava Nagila". By 1987, the Bay Area thrash metal scene had increased in popularity, with the releases of debut albums such as Testament's The Legacy, Death Angel's The Ultra-Violence and Heathen's Breaking the Silence, while Exodus released their second album Pleasures of the Flesh, Lȧȧz Rockit released their third album Know Your Enemy and Possessed released the Joe Satriani-produced EP The Eyes of Horror. All of the "Big Four" of Teutonic thrash metal also released albums that year: Kreator's Terrible Certainty, Destruction's Release from Agony, Sodom's Persecution Mania and Tankard's Chemical Invasion; those albums cemented their reputations as top-tier German thrash metal bands. Additionally other established international bands were starting to expand their sound into a more technical and sophisticated approach, with Voivod's Killing Technology and Coroner's debut album R.I.P. helping launch the sound of technical thrash metal into greater heights, while Sepultura's second album Schizophrenia saw them transition away from the black metal sound of its predecessor in favor of a technical, deathrash vein.

In response to thrash metal's growing popularity during this period, several hardcore punk bands began changing their style to a more heavier direction, including Venice, Los Angeles act Suicidal Tendencies, who are often considered to be one of the "fathers of crossover thrash", and became more recognized as a thrash metal band in the late 1980s (thanks in large part to the presence of guitarists Rocky George and Mike Clark); the band would reach new heights of success with their first two major-label albums, How Will I Laugh Tomorrow When I Can't Even Smile Today (1988) and Controlled by Hatred/Feel Like Shit... Déjà Vu (1989). D.R.I.'s music took a similar direction with their last three albums of the 1980s, Crossover (1987), 4 of a Kind (1988), and Thrash Zone (1989). This trend was expanded by many bands that came from a punk background, including UK acts Discharge and The Exploited, Los Angeles bands Wasted Youth, Cryptic Slaughter, Excel, Beowülf and No Mercy, and New York hardcore acts Agnostic Front, Murphy's Law, the Cro-Mags, M.O.D. (fronted by former S.O.D. singer Billy Milano), the Crumbsuckers, Ludichrist, Leeway, and Prong.

From 1987 to 1989, Overkill released three albums often regarded as the peak of the band's classic period: Taking Over refined their early speed-driven aggression, Under the Influence presented a more concise and controlled approach, and The Years of Decay introduced a darker, more expansive, and more ambitious and progressive sound. Each of the "Big Four" of thrash metal also issued a major release in 1988, though the results pointed in very different directions after the genre-defining breakthroughs of 1986 and 1987. Slayer's South of Heaven was a striking turn away from the unrelenting velocity of Reign in Blood, favoring slower, darker, and more melodic songwriting and singing. Megadeth's So Far, So Good... So What! was a more uneven record, but it still pushed the band toward a broader and more eclectic style. Anthrax's State of Euphoria is often seen as one of the weaker entries in their classic period, lacking the consistency of their previous work, though it did produce the popular cover of "Antisocial" by Trust. Metallica's ...And Justice for All, meanwhile, intensified the band's increasingly technical and progressive tendencies, expanding song structures and rhythmic complexity in a way they would later scale back, even as the album spawned their first video and Top 40 hit with the World War I-themed song "One". That same year, Metallica joined Van Halen, Scorpions, Dokken and Kingdom Come on the two-month-long arena and stadium tour Monsters of Rock in North America. In the spring of 1989, Anthrax teamed up with Exodus and Helloween on a US arena tour sponsored by Headbangers Ball.

Sepultura's third album, Beneath the Remains (1989), earned them some mainstream appeal as it was released by Roadrunner Records. Testament's second and third albums, The New Order (1988) and Practice What You Preach (1989), nearly gained them the same level of popularity as the "Big Four", while Exodus' third album Fabulous Disaster (1989) garnered the band their first music video and one of their most recognized songs, the mosh-pit anthem "The Toxic Waltz". Vio-lence, Forbidden, and Sadus, three relative latecomers to the Bay Area thrash metal scene, released their debut albums Eternal Nightmare, Forbidden Evil, and Illusions, respectively, in 1988; the latter album demonstrated a sound that was primarily driven by the fretless bass of Steve Di Giorgio. Also in 1988, Blind Illusion released its only studio album for more than two decades, The Sane Asylum, which received some particular attention as it was produced by Kirk Hammett, and is also notable for featuring bassist Les Claypool and former Possessed guitarist Larry LaLonde; after its release, the two would later team up together in Claypool's then-upcoming band Primus. Lȧȧz Rockit's fourth studio album Annihilation Principle (1989) also received some attention, due to the inclusion of their cover version of the Dead Kennedys' "Holiday in Cambodia" and the rotation of the music video for its opening track "Fire in the Hole" on MTV's Headbangers Ball.

Canadian thrashers Annihilator released their highly technical debut Alice in Hell in 1989, which was praised for its fast riffs and extended guitar solos. The popularity of the German thrash metal scene was expanded that year with albums that included Sodom's Agent Orange, Kreator's Extreme Aggression, Holy Moses' The New Machine of Liechtenstein and Paradox's Heresy. Several highly acclaimed albums associated with the subgenre of technical thrash metal were also released in 1989, including Coroner's No More Color, Dark Angel's Leave Scars, Onslaught's In Search of Sanity, Sabbat's Dreamweaver, Toxik's Think This and Watchtower's Control and Resistance, which has been recognized and acknowledged as one of the cornerstones of jazz-metal fusion and a major influence on the technical death metal genre, while Forced Entry's debut album Uncertain Future helped pioneer the late 1980s Seattle music scene.

=== Thrash metal in the 1990s ===
==== Continued popularity (1990–1991) ====
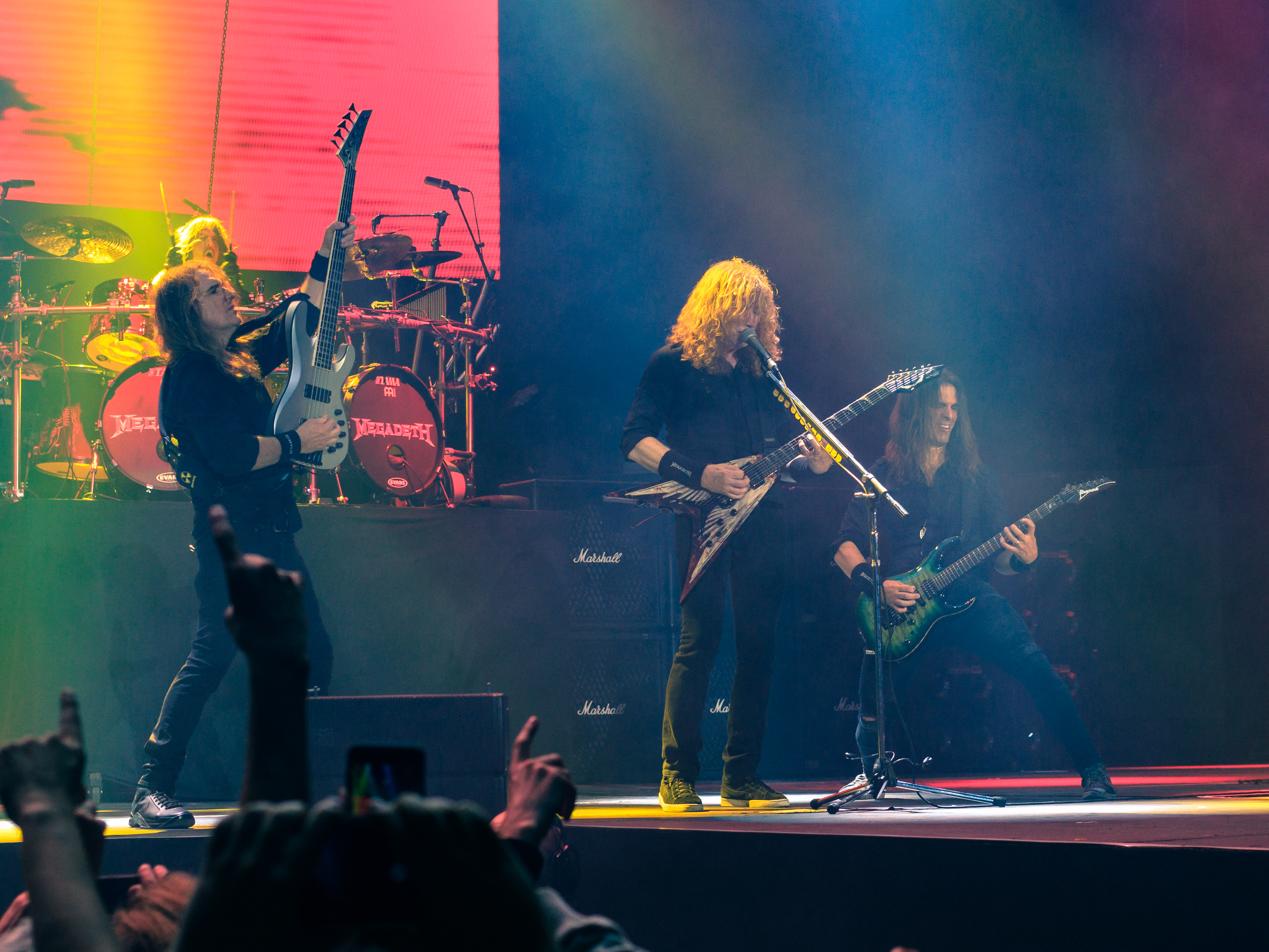
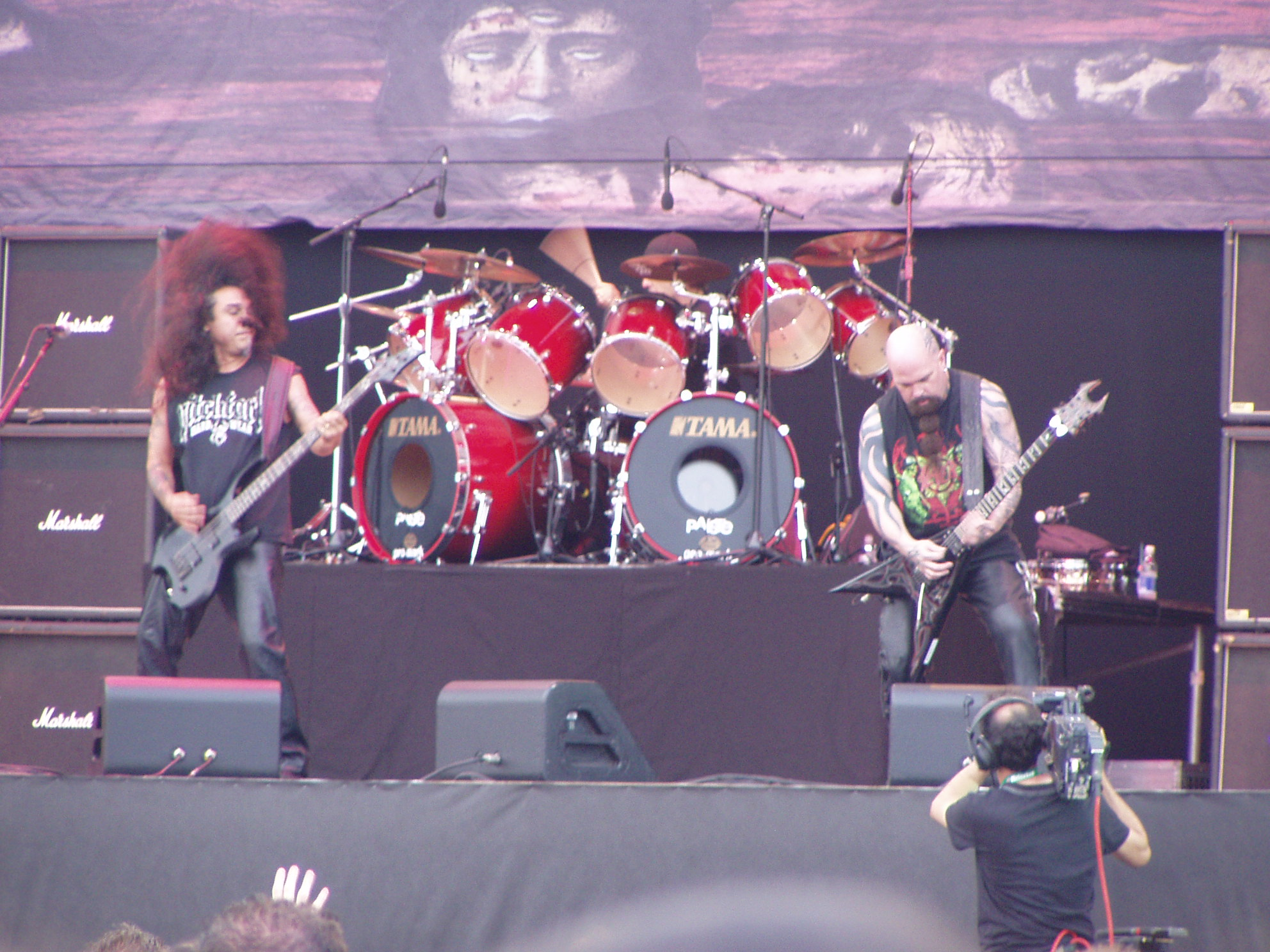
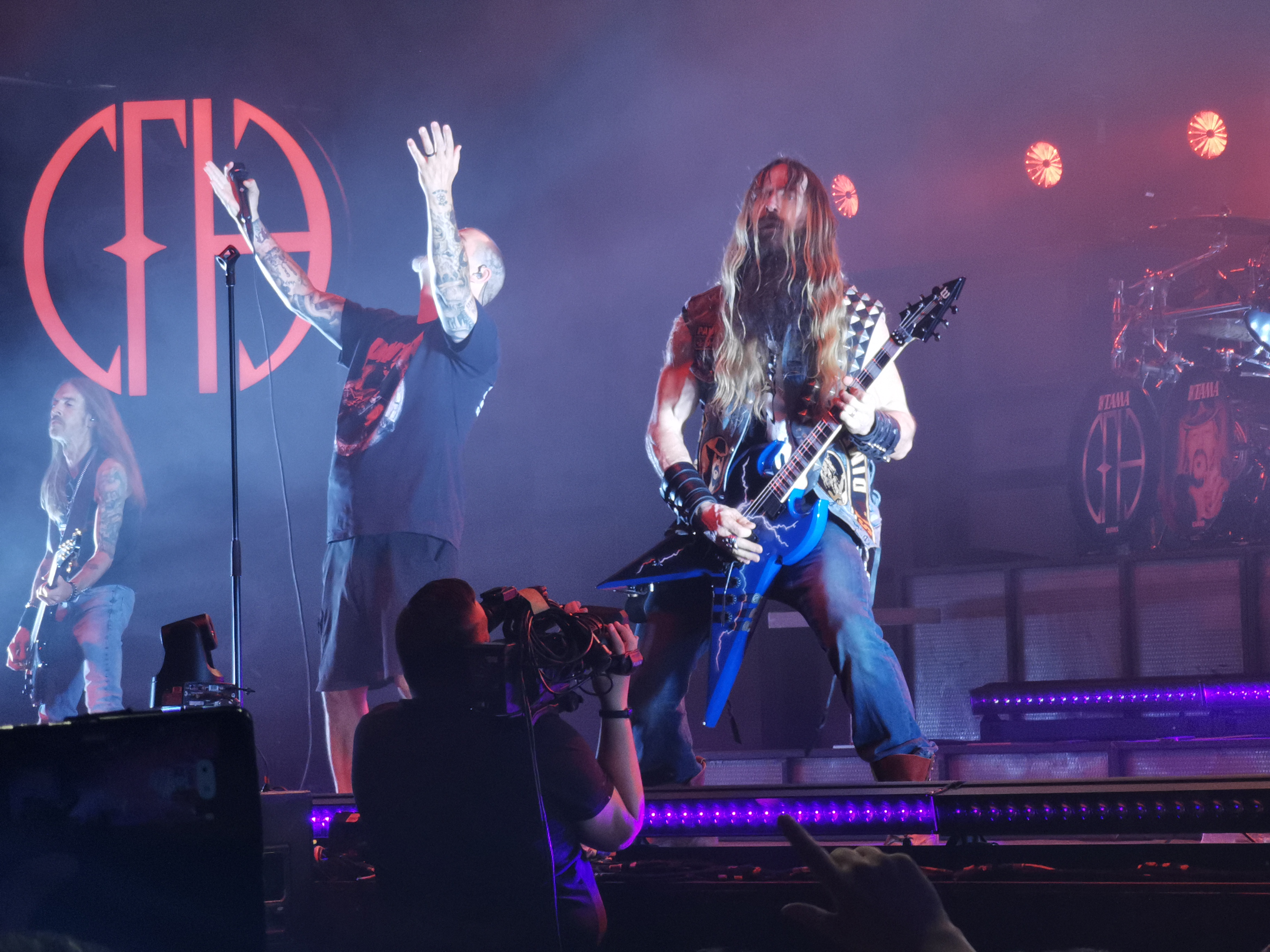
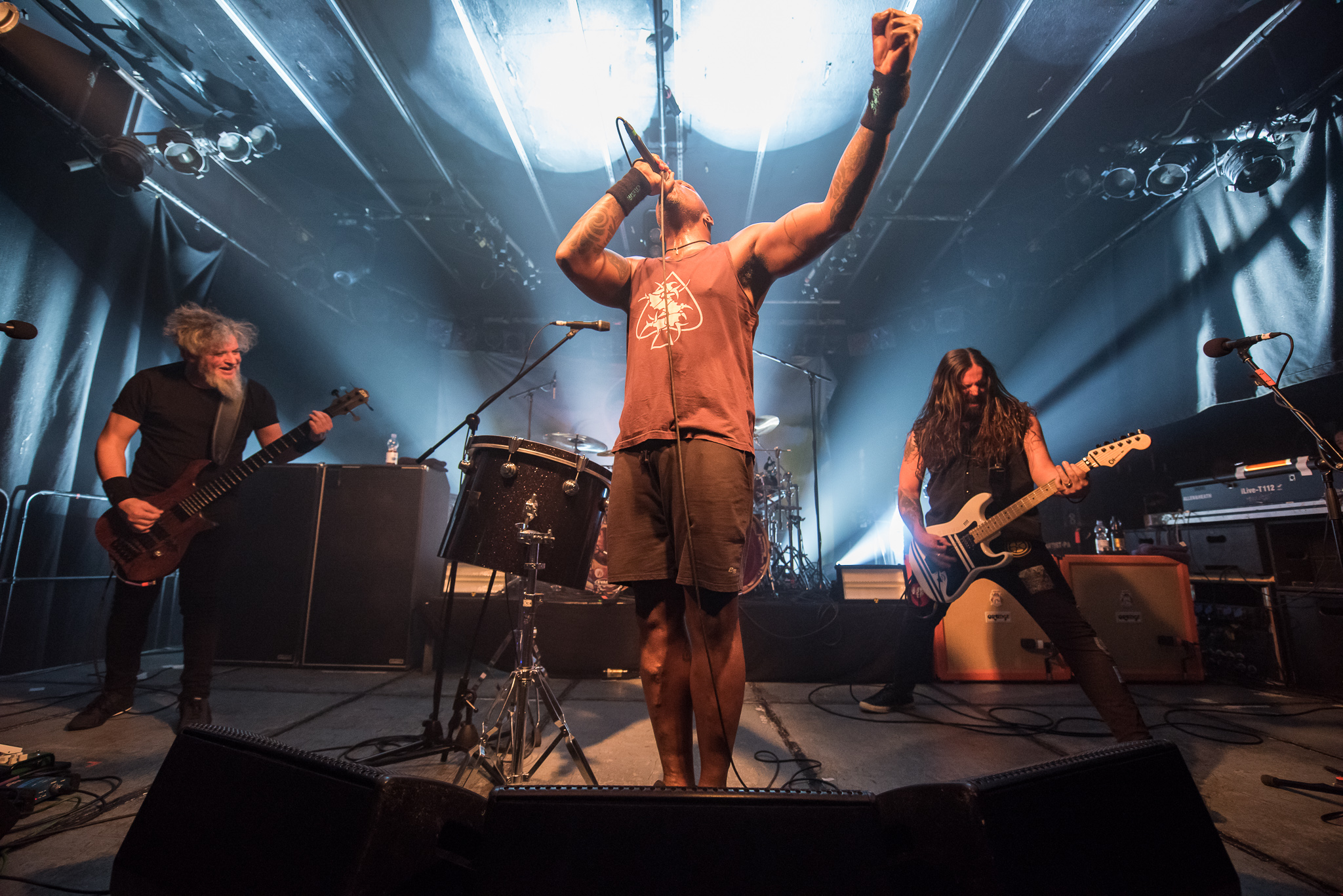
Two of the "Big Four" of thrash metal, Megadeth and Slayer (both pictured above), released the most successful albums of their careers up to this point (Rust in Peace and Seasons in the Abyss, respectively), while Cowboys from Hell by Pantera (bottom left) and Arise by Sepultura (bottom right) are credited for ushering in the styles of groove metal and deathrash, respectively.

A number of more typical but technically sophisticated albums were released in 1990, including Megadeth's Rust in Peace, Anthrax's Persistence of Time, Slayer's Seasons in the Abyss, Suicidal Tendencies' Lights...Camera...Revolution!, Testament's Souls of Black, Kreator's Coma of Souls, Destruction's Cracked Brain, Forbidden's Twisted into Form, Exodus' Impact Is Imminent, Death Angel's Act III, Sodom's Better Off Dead, Sanctuary's Into the Mirror Black, Annihilator's Never, Neverland, Sacred Reich's The American Way and Xentrix's For Whose Advantage?. At the same time, some albums from this wave, though somewhat distinct in style, have also been credited with helping define the then-developing groove metal genre, most notably Prong's Beg to Differ, Pantera's Cowboys from Hell and Exhorder's Slaughter in the Vatican. All of those albums were commercial high points for the aforementioned artists. During this period, Megadeth and Slayer co-headlined one of the most successful tours in thrash metal history called the Clash of the Titans; the first leg in Europe included support from Testament and Suicidal Tendencies, while the second leg in North America had Anthrax and then-emerging Seattle band Alice in Chains, who were the supporting act.

1991 is considered to be the final year of thrash metal's creative peak, marking the transition where several bands were reaching wider experimentation while others continued to adopt characteristics of progressive and technical abilities. Sepultura's fourth album Arise was one of the most commercially significant releases of this period, it mixed the deathrash sound of Beneath the Remains with industrial music, hardcore punk and Latin percussion influences. Prong also moved to a much greater experimentation on their third album Prove You Wrong, continuing in the thrash/groove metal sound of Beg to Differ while adding elements and influences of alternative, funk, progressive and industrial music. In 1991, Dark Angel, Evildead, Forced Entry, Heathen, Intruder, Lȧȧz Rockit, Sabbat and Wrathchild America all released their final albums before disbanding later in the decade, Time Does Not Heal, The Underworld, As Above, So Below, Victims of Deception, Psycho Savant, Nothing's Sacred, Mourning Has Broken, and 3-D, respectively. Other notable thrash metal albums released in 1991 include Overkill's Horrorscope and Coroner's Mental Vortex.

==== Decline and crossroads (1991–1999) ====
The era of 1991–1992 marked the beginning of the end of thrash metal's commercial peak, due to the rising popularity of the alternative metal and grunge movements (the latter spearheaded by Washington-based bands Nirvana, Soundgarden, Alice in Chains and Pearl Jam). In response to this climate change, many thrash metal bands that had emerged from the previous decade had called it quits or went on hiatus during the 1990s, while half of the "Big Four" and other veteran bands began changing to more accessible, radio-friendly styles.

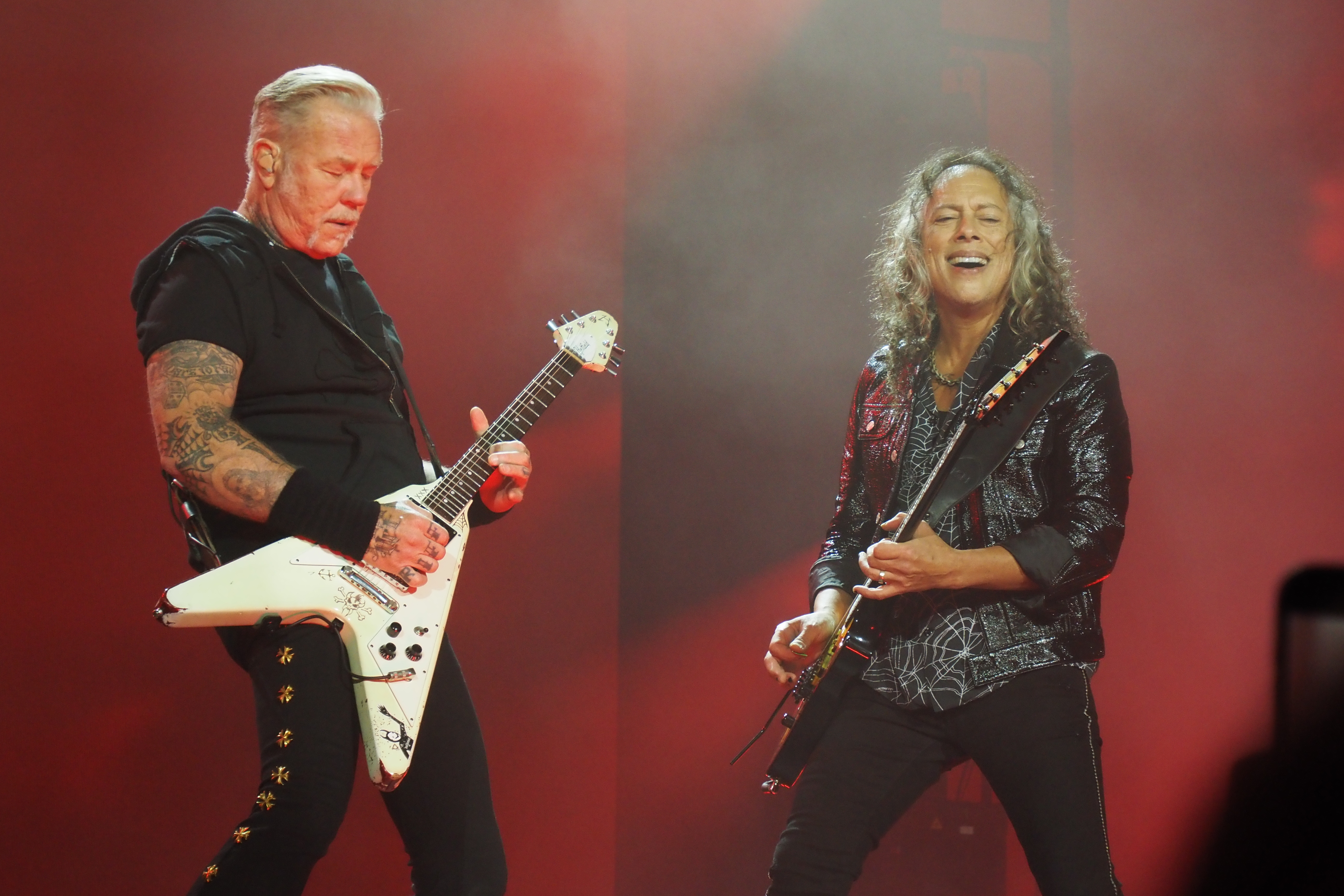
Metallica, who achieved its number one debut on the Billboard 200 with their self-titled Black Album, was one of the first "Big Four" bands to tone down their music to make it more accessible to a mainstream audience.

Metallica took the first major step in this stylistic shift with the release in 1991 of their new album eponymous fifth studio album, known as The Black Album. Produced by Bob Rock (who was then known for working with the likes of Mötley Crüe, Aerosmith, Bon Jovi and The Cult), the album marked a stylistic change in the band, eliminating much of the speed and longer song structures of the band's previous work, and instead focusing on more concise and heavier songs. The album was a change in Metallica's direction from the thrash metal style of the band's previous four studio albums towards a more contemporary heavy metal sound with original hard rock elements, but still had remnant characteristics of thrash metal. Metallica would go on to become the band's best-selling album and began a wave of thrash metal bands releasing more garage-oriented albums, or else more experimental ones.

Megadeth also moved toward a more accessible heavy metal sound beginning with their 1992 album Countdown to Extinction. Testament, Exodus and Flotsam and Jetsam all took a melodic/progressive approach with the albums The Ritual, Force of Habit, and Cuatro, respectively. Sodom began a transitional period with their fifth studio album Tapping the Vein (1992), which saw the band lean more towards death metal before experimenting with elements of crossover thrash on their next few albums. Several pioneering crossover thrash bands also started to experiment with other genres during this period, including Suicidal Tendencies with their sixth album The Art of Rebellion, where the band combined elements of alternative, pop rock and funk metal into their thrashy sound. Corrosion of Conformity had abandoned their crossover thrash sound in favor of a more Black Sabbath and Lynyrd Skynyrd-influenced heavy metal direction, adapting influences and textures of sludge, doom metal, blues, and southern rock on several of their albums, including Blind (1991), Deliverance (1994) and Wiseblood (1996).

The remainder of the 1990s saw many thrash metal bands expand their sound by adding elements and influences from the groove metal genre, which was then popularized by Pantera, White Zombie and Machine Head. Anthrax, who had recently replaced Joey Belladonna with John Bush as their singer, began stepping away from their previously established thrash metal formula to this more accessible alternative/groove metal approach for the remainder of their 1990s output, starting with and including Sound of White Noise (1993). Other bands that had followed this trend were Kreator, Nuclear Assault, Sacred Reich, Overkill, Coroner, Prong, Testament, Annihilator, Forbidden, and Flotsam and Jetsam with their respective albums Renewal, Something Wicked, Independent, I Hear Black, Grin, Cleansing, Low, King of the Kill, Distortion, and Drift, in some cases featuring industrial, alternative, progressive and even slight death metal elements. Sepultura's 1993 album Chaos A.D. also marked the beginning of their transition away from death/thrash metal to groove metal which had influenced then-up-and-coming bands like Korn, who reciprocally became the inspiration behind the nu metal style of the band's next album Roots (1996). Roots would influence a generation of bands from Linkin Park to Slipknot, which during the 1990s meant the replacement of death, thrash, and speed, by nu metal and metalcore as popular epicenters of the hardest metal scene.

Megadeth moved further away from thrash on Youthanasia in 1994. While its predecessor still retained some noticeable thrash elements, this album placed greater emphasis on mid-tempo heaviness, more concise songwriting, and a more soft and polished melodic approach. Slayer did not radically alter its style on their sixth studio album Divine Intervention (1994), but the album marked a rougher and less cohesive phase, combining the band's established speed with a harsher, more grinding sound with groove and hardcore punk elements. Following this was an album of hardcore punk covers Undisputed Attitude (1996), which served as "the middle finger to the trendy pop-punk scene" (dominated by Green Day and the Offspring). On their eighth studio album Diabolus in Musica (1998), Slayer departed more clearly from its earlier formula, emphasizing lower tunings, thicker grooves, and a sound often associated with the late-1990s metal scene.

Metallica then took a second major turn in their stylistic evolution with Load in 1996 and ReLoad in 1997. Rather than returning to thrash, the band moved further into a slower, more grunge-oriented hard rock and alternative sound, drawing on bluesy and southern rock textures with country elements, while keeping some of the weight and polish that had made them so commercially powerful. At the same time, many listeners saw them as uneven records, since some of the material lacked the focus, intensity, and distinctive drive of the band's earlier work, making the shift feel both ambitious and, in part, artistically diluted.

Staying away from this new commercial mainstream of groove metal, alternative metal, metalcore, and especially nu metal, the second wave of black metal emerged as an opposed underground music scene, initially in Norway. This crop of new bands differenced themselves from the "first wave" by totally distilling black metal from the combined origins with thrash metal, but they preserved from all these sub-genres the emphasis on atmosphere over rhythm.

As further extreme metal genres came to prominence in the 1990s (industrial metal, death metal, and black metal each finding their own fanbase), the heavy metal "family tree" soon found itself blending aesthetics and styles. For example, bands with all the musical traits of thrash metal began using death growls, a vocal style borrowed from death metal, while black metal bands often utilized the airy feel of synthesizers, popularized in industrial metal. Today the placing of bands within distinct sub-genres remains a source of contention for heavy metal fans, however, little debate resides over the fact that thrash metal is the sole proprietor of its respective spin-offs.

=== Revivals (1999–present) ===
The resurgence of interest in the thrash metal genre was widely attributed to Testament's 1999 album The Gathering. It is significant for not only its lineup (with frontman Chuck Billy and guitarist Eric Peterson joined by original Slayer drummer Dave Lombardo, former Death, Obituary and Cancer guitarist James Murphy, and Sadus and former Death bassist Steve Di Giorgio), but for the return to the band's classic thrash metal sound while the album retained some of the death metal elements of its predecessor Demonic. This resurgence coincided with other veteran bands returning to their classic sound of thrash on their respective albums, including Annihilator's Criteria for a Black Widow (1999), Artillery's B.A.C.K. (1999), Metal Church's Masterpeace (1999), Sodom's Code Red (1999), and Destruction's All Hell Breaks Loose (2000).

The resurgence of thrash metal in the late 1990s and early 2000s was serious enough that it allowed many bands from the genre's heyday an opportunity to reform. The Thrash of the Titans festival, which was held in August 2001 as a co-benefit concert for Testament singer Chuck Billy and Death's Chuck Schuldiner (who were both battling cancer), saw several bands from the 1980s Bay Area thrash metal scene reunite, including Exodus, Death Angel, Vio-lence, Forbidden Evil, Sadus and Legacy (a precursor to Testament). Many thrash metal bands outside of the Bay Area would subsequently reunite, including Anthrax (twice with Joey Belladonna and briefly with John Bush), Dark Angel, Nuclear Assault, Hirax, Sacred Reich, Whiplash, UK bands Onslaught, Sabbat, and Xentrix, and Canada's Sacrifice, renewing interest in previous decades.

A few thrash metal bands from the 1980s and early 1990s, particularly the genre's U.S. "Big Four", continued recording and touring with success in the 2000s. In 2003, Anthrax released their first studio album in five years We've Come for You All, followed a month later by Metallica's double platinum-certified album St. Anger. After experimenting further with a commercialized sound on their previous few albums, Megadeth returned to its heavier sound with their ninth album The World Needs a Hero (2001). It would be the band's final album before disbanding in the following year, due to an arm injury that had left Dave Mustaine unable to play guitar; he would eventually reform Megadeth for a handful of albums, including The System Has Failed (2004) which was originally going to be released as a solo album by him, before reuniting with co-founding member and bassist David Ellefson in 2010. Slayer released three albums in the 2000s: God Hates Us All (2001), which saw a return to their signature thrash metal sound, followed by Christ Illusion (2006) and World Painted Blood (2009), both of which marked their first studio albums with drummer Dave Lombardo in nearly two decades. Although their career had declined from its peak in the 1990s, Overkill was perhaps one of the most-active thrash metal groups outside of the "Big Four", having never disbanded or taken longer breaks in-between records, and with 1999's Necroshine, they were the first band in the genre to release ten studio albums. Overkill's popularity was reignited in the 2010s, with three of their albums, The Electric Age (2012), White Devil Armory (2014) and The Grinding Wheel (2017), all entering the Top 100 on the Billboard charts.

The term "thrash-revivalists" has been applied to such bands as Lamb of God, Municipal Waste, Evile, Havok, Warbringer, Vektor, Bonded by Blood, Hatchet, and Power Trip. Evile's 2007 debut album Enter the Grave, produced by former Metallica producer and engineer Flemming Rasmussen, received considerable praise for its sound, which combined elements of the sounds of Slayer and the Bay Area scene (particularly Exodus and Testament). Los Angeles-based bands Warbringer and Bonded by Blood took a similar approach on their respective debut albums, War Without End and Feed the Beast, both released in 2008. Perhaps the most commercially successful band from the 2000s and 2010s thrash metal revival movement is Lamb of God, who are also considered a key part of the new wave of American heavy metal movement, have received two gold-certified albums in the U.S., and have gone from playing small clubs to arenas and stadiums.

Notable bands returned to their roots with albums such as Kreator's Violent Revolution (2001), Metallica's Death Magnetic (2008), Megadeth's Endgame (2009), Slayer's World Painted Blood (2009), Exodus' Exhibit B: The Human Condition (2010), Overkill's Ironbound (2010), Anthrax's Worship Music (2011), Testament's Dark Roots of Earth (2012), and Flotsam and Jetsam's Ugly Noise (2012). More recent bands of the genre, such as Havok and Legion of the Damned have turned their focus towards a more aggressive rendition of thrash metal, incorporating elements of melodic death metal.

== Derivative forms ==
Thrash metal is directly responsible for the development of underground metal genres, such as death metal, black metal, and groove metal. In addition to this, metalcore, grindcore, and deathcore employ similar riffs in their composition, the former with more focus on melody rather than chromaticism. The blending of punk ethos and metal's brutal nature led to even more extreme, underground styles after thrash metal began gaining mild commercial success in the late 1980s.

With gorier subject matter, heavier down tuning of guitars, more consistent use of blast beat drumming, and darker, atonal death growls, death metal was established in the mid-1980s. Black metal, also related to thrash metal, emerged at the same time, with many black metal bands taking influence from thrash metal bands such as Venom. Black metal continued deviating from thrash metal, often providing more orchestral overtones, open tremolo picking, blast beat drumming, shrieked or raspy vocals and pagan or occult-based aesthetics to distinguish itself from thrash metal. Thrash metal would later combine with its spinoffs, thus giving rise to genres like blackened thrash metal and deathrash.

=== Crossover thrash ===
Thrash metal with stronger punk elements is called crossover thrash. Its overall sound is more punk-influenced than traditional thrash metal but has more heavy metal elements than hardcore punk and thrashcore.

=== Dream thrash ===
A fusion of thrash metal with shoegaze is called dream thrash. According to Emma Cownley of Metal Hammer, "Dream thrash combines the ethereal sounds of shoegaze with the distortion, blast beats and tremolo picking of thrash." One practitioner of this style is Astronoid.

=== Groove metal ===
Groove metal takes the intensity and sonic qualities of thrash metal and plays them at mid-tempo, with most bands making only occasional forays into fast tempo, but since the early 1990s, it started to favor a more death metal-derived sound.

=== Technical thrash metal ===
Technical thrash (also known as progressive thrash) is a "far more complex" variant of thrash metal that emphasizes "progressive" songwriting. The style is mostly combined with elements and influences from the styles of thrash metal, the new wave of British heavy metal (NWOBHM), progressive rock, avant-garde and jazz fusion. Watchtower are said to be pioneers of technical thrash metal, and their debut album Energetic Disassembly (1985) is widely regarded as the first album to mix thrash with progressive metal. Other practitioners of the style include Voivod, Coroner, Annihilator, Deathrow, Blind Illusion, Toxik, Artillery, Mekong Delta, Sadus, Heathen, Forced Entry and Anacrusis. During the late 1980s and early 1990s, several veteran thrash metal bands began to expand their sound with a combination of technical, complex and progressive structures; notable examples include Metallica's ...And Justice for All (1988), Annihilator's Alice in Hell (1989), Overkill's The Years of Decay (1989), Megadeth's Rust in Peace (1990), Dark Angel's Time Does Not Heal (1991), Heathen's Victims of Deception (1991), and much of Testament's late 1980s and 1990s output. Technical thrash metal is considered by some to be a precursor to technical death metal. Coroner guitarist Tommy Vetterli himself took credit for "co-invent[ing] the technical progressive thrash metal movement" in a 2026 interview with Metal Hammer.

== Regional scenes ==
Thrash metal emerged predominantly from a handful of regional scenes, each of which was generally distinguished by the unique characteristics of its bands.

- Australian thrash metal: While not considered a "major" part of the worldwide thrash metal scene due to distance from the major Bay Area and Teutonic scenes, Australian thrash metal has had a fairly substantial following in overseas markets, while local audiences have always been difficult to gather. The most notable Australian thrash metal bands from the 1980s are Mortal Sin, Nothing Sacred and Hobbs' Angel of Death.
- Bay Area thrash metal, also known as West Coast thrash metal: In addition to being the most commercially successful, the West Coast's thrash metal (mostly centered in California) is the most progressive and technical of the major regional thrash scenes, being strongly NWOBHM-influenced. Metallica (originally from Los Angeles), Exodus, Testament, Metal Church, Possessed, Death Angel, Attitude Adjustment, Lȧȧz Rockit, Vio-lence, Forbidden, Defiance, Sadus, Mordred and Blind Illusion are prominent examples of bands to emerge from the Bay Area. Although Megadeth, Slayer, Dark Angel and Suicidal Tendencies were all technically from Los Angeles, those bands are often credited for popularizing and contributing to the thrash metal scene in Northern California during the 1980s by frequently playing shows there, especially early in their careers and/or before they received their first record deal.
- Brazilian thrash metal: The Brazilian thrash scene is notable for producing a handful of bands that would become principal parts of thrash metal's prevalence in the early 1990s. There were three scenes where Brazilian thrash metal originated: Belo Horizonte (the most prominent), São Paulo, and Rio de Janeiro. The most notable bands from this scene are Sepultura, Dorsal Atlântica, Executer, Mutilator, Chakal, Korzus, Holocausto, Claustrofobia, Torture Squad, Ratos de Porão, Sagrado Inferno, Vulcano and Sarcófago.
- British thrash metal: The British thrash scene originated from NWOBHM bands like Raven, Jaguar, Warfare and Dragonslayer (originally called Slayer) beginning to play accelerated heavy metal. This led to British thrash metal bands leaning towards a more traditional heavy metal approach, often heavier though less aggressive than their American counterparts. Additionally, crust punk is an integral part of the British thrash metal scene. The most notable bands from this scene are Onslaught, Cancer, Amebix, Sabbat, Detritus, Xentrix, Sacrilege, Nightlord, Atomkraft, Hellbastard, Cerebral Fix, Seventh Angel, Acid Reign and Lawnmower Deth.
- Canadian thrash metal: The Canadian region has seen numerous thrash metal bands create a unique blend of speed metal, progressive and hardcore punk into their music, influenced by a variety of acts such as Rush, Iron Maiden, Judas Priest, Motörhead and D.R.I., as well as fellow U.S. thrash metal bands like Metallica and Slayer. Anvil and Exciter are considered to be the pioneers of this scene, while Voivod, Sacrifice, Razor, and Annihilator are often referred to as the country's "Big Four". Notable crossover bands from the hardcore punk scene include West Coast bands Death Sentence and Beyond Possession. Other notable Canadian thrash metal bands include Infernäl Mäjesty, Anonymus, Eudoxis, Piledriver, Slaughter, DBC and Obliveon.
- East Coast thrash metal: Centered in New York and New Jersey, the East Coast's thrash metal tended to display a sound that incorporated a strong hardcore punk influence. An emphasis was placed on aggression and speed rather than technicality. Anthrax, Overkill, Carnivore, Nuclear Assault, Meanstreak, Warzone, Prong, Toxik, Whiplash, Wrathchild America and Demolition Hammer exemplified the style to emerge from this regional scene.
- Gulf Coast thrash metal: While not as popular as the West Coast and East Coast regions, the Gulf Coast has spawned at least three thrash metal scenes (including Texas, Louisiana and Florida) during the late 1980s and early 1990s, which saw a number of bands develop a style that was influenced by punk rock and/or the early-to-mid 1980s heavy metal scene. The most notable bands from the Gulf Coast are Atheist, Solstice, Juggernaut, Opprobrium (formerly named Incubus), Watchtower, Rigor Mortis, D.R.I., Absu, Nasty Savage, Verbal Abuse, Angkor Wat, Dead Horse, Pantera and Exhorder, the latter of the two (along with New York's Prong) are often credited for developing and popularizing the groove metal genre in the early 1990s.
- Teutonic thrash metal: The German and Swiss regions have spawned dozens of bands since the mid-1980s that developed their own style. Their style was more aggressive than American and Canadian thrash. The most prominent bands from this scene are Kreator, Destruction, Sodom, Tankard, Celtic Frost, Holy Moses, Desaster, Coroner, Exumer, Despair, Paradox, Messiah, Assassin, Poltergeist, Living Death and Sieges Even (who were originally called Sodom).

== See also ==
- List of thrash metal bands

== Bibliography ==
- Ekeroth, Daniel (2008). Swedish Death Metal. Bazillion Points Books. ISBN 978-0-9796163-1-0.
- Pillsbury, Glenn (2006). Damage Incorporated: Metallica and the Production of Musical Identity. Routledge. ISBN 1-136-09122-X.
- Sharpe-Young, Garry (2007a). Thrash Metal. Zonda Books Limited. ISBN 978-0-9582684-3-1.
- Sharpe-Young, Garry (2007b). Metal: A Definitive Guide. New Plymouth: Jawbone. ISBN 978-1-906002-01-5.
- Weinstein, Deena (2000). Heavy Metal: The Music and Its Culture. Da Capo Press. ISBN 978-0-306-80970-5.
