= Kreator discography =

Kreator (band)

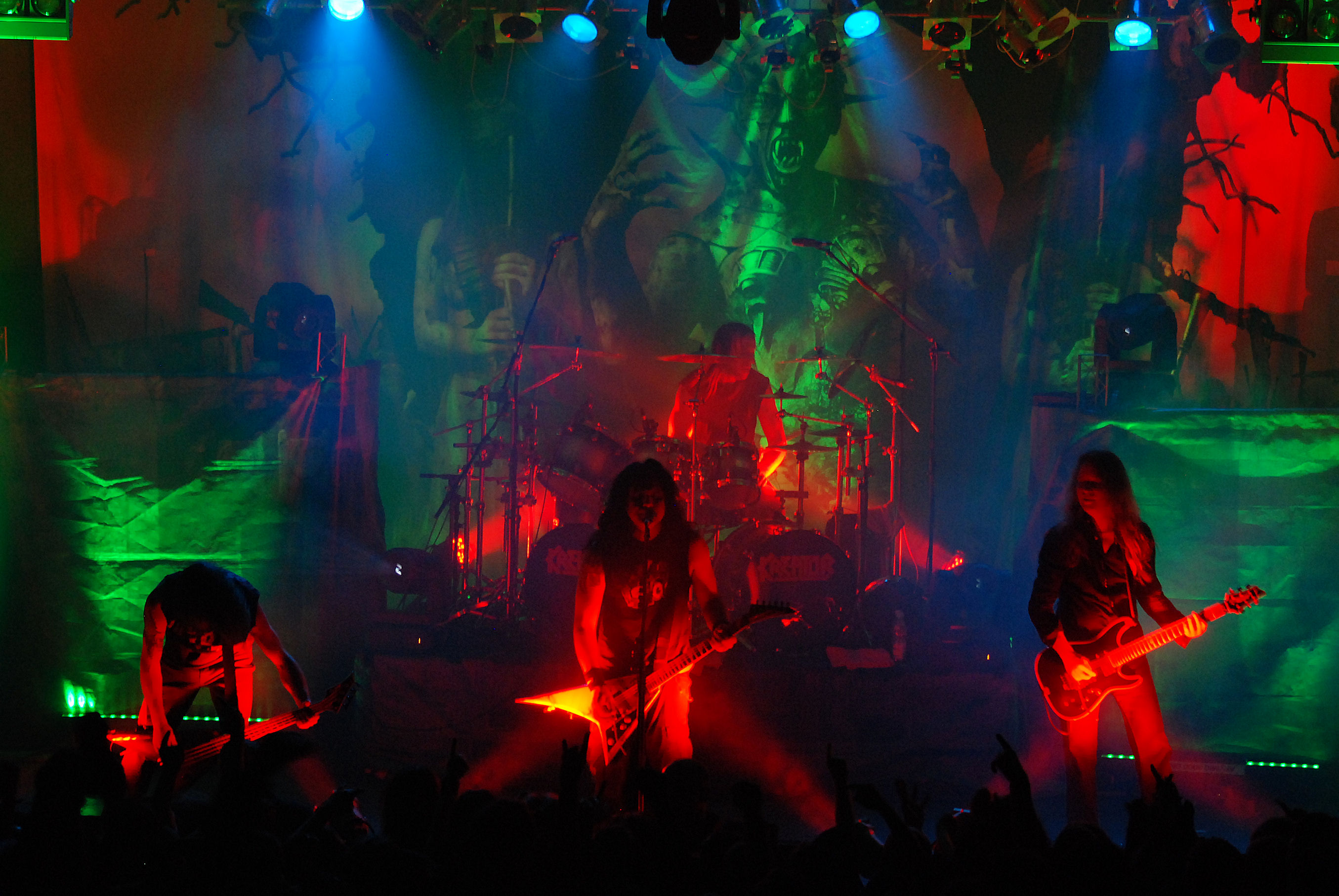
- Kreator performing in 2009
- Studio albums: 16
- Extended plays: 2
- Live albums: 3
- Compilation albums: 4
- Singles: 7
- Video albums: 4
- Music videos: 23

The following is the complete discography of the German thrash metal band Kreator.

== Albums ==
=== Studio albums ===
Year	Album details	Peak chart positions										
Year	Album details	GER	AUT	BEL (FL)	BEL (WA)	CHE	FIN	FRA	JPN	NLD	SWE	US
1985	Endless Pain: Released: October 1985; Label: Noise; Formats: CD, CS, LP, DI	—	—	—	—	—	—	—	—	—	—	—
1986	Pleasure to Kill: Released: 1 April 1986; Label: Noise; Formats: CD, CS, LP, DI	99	—	—	—	—	—	—	—	—	—	—
1987	Terrible Certainty: Released: 22 September 1987; Label: Noise; Formats: CD, CS, LP, DI	—	—	—	—	—	—	—	—	—	—	—
1989	Extreme Aggression: Released: 19 June 1989; Label: Noise; Formats: CD, LP, DI	90	—	—	—	—	—	—	—	68	—	—
1990	Coma of Souls: Released: 6 November 1990; Label: Noise; Formats: CD, LP, DI	83	—	—	—	—	—	—	—	—	—	—
1992	Renewal: Released: 26 October 1992; Label: Noise; Formats: CD, LP, DI	—	—	—	—	—	—	—	—	—	—	—
1995	Cause for Conflict: Released: 1 August 1995; Label: GUN; Formats: CD, DI	48	—	—	50	—	—	—	—	—	—	—
1997	Outcast: Released: 22 July 1997; Label: GUN; Formats: CD, DI	91	—	—	—	—	—	—	—	—	—	—
1999	Endorama: Released: 20 April 1999; Label: Drakkar; Formats: CD, DI	68	—	—	—	—	—	—	—	—	—	—
2001	Violent Revolution: Released: 25 September 2001; Label: Steamhammer; Formats: CD, LP, DI	21	—	—	—	—	—	—	—	—	—	—
2005	Enemy of God: Released: 10 January 2005; Label: Steamhammer; Formats: CD, LP, DI	19	45	90	—	—	—	84	118	—	38	—
2009	Hordes of Chaos: Released: 13 January 2009; Label: Steamhammer; Formats: CD, LP, DI	16	33	—	—	57	16	85	163	66	47	165
2012	Phantom Antichrist: Released: 1 June 2012; Label: Nuclear Blast; Formats: CD, LP, DI	5	31	75	84	22	11	87	63	87	30	130
2017	Gods of Violence: Released: 27 January 2017; Label: Nuclear Blast; Formats: CD, LP, DI	1	4	20	46	13	7	59	55	58	19	118
2022	Hate Über Alles: Released: 10 June 2022; Label: Nuclear Blast; Formats: CD, LP, DI	2	6	43	23	7	4	—	30	53	—	—
2026	Krushers of the World: Released: 16 January 2026; Label: Nuclear Blast; Formats: CD, LP, DI	2	2	11	21	15	8	64	30	96	7	—
"—" denotes releases that did not chart or were not released in that country.

=== Live albums ===
Year	Album details	Peak chart positions		
Year	Album details	GER	BEL (WA)	FRA
2003	Live Kreation: Released: 22 July 2003; Label: Steamhammer; Formats: CD, LP	59	–	–
2013	Dying Alive: Released: 30 August 2013; Label: Nuclear Blast; Formats: CD, LP	9	142	170
2020	London Apocalypticon – Live at the Roundhouse: Released: 14 February 2020; Label: Nuclear Blast; Formats: CD, LP, Blu-ray	10	–	195

=== Compilation albums ===
Year	Album details
1996	Scenarios of Violence: Released: 19 March 1996; Label: Noise; Formats: CD
1999	Voices of Transgression: Released: 4 April 1999; Label: GUN; Formats: CD
2000	Past Life Trauma (1985–1992): Released: 26 December 2000; Label: Noise; Formats: CD
2016	Love Us or Hate Us – The Very Best of the Noise Years 1985–1992: Released: 6 May 2016; Label: Sanctuary; Formats: 2CD
2021	Under the Guillotine - The Noise Records Anthology: Released: 26 Feb 2021; Label: Sanctuary; Formats: 2 x Vinyl

=== Video albums ===
Year	Album details	Peak chart positions
Year	Album details	CHE
1990	Live in East Berlin: Label: Noise; Formats: VHS	—
1991	Hallucinative Comas: Label: Noise; Formats: VHS	—
2003	Live Kreation: Revisioned Glory: Released: 1 July 2003; Label: Steamhammer; Formats: DVD	—
2008	At the Pulse of Kapitulation 1990/1991: Released: 28 March 2008; Label: Steamhammer; Formats: DVD	—
2013	Dying Alive: Released: 30 August 2013; Label: Nuclear Blast; Formats: DVD and Blu-ray	4
2020	London Apocalypticon – Live at the Roundhouse: Released: 14 February 2020; Label: Nuclear Blast; Formats: CD, LP, Blu-ray	10

== EPs ==
Year	EP details	Notes
1986	Flag of Hate: Label: Noise; Formats: CD, CS, LP	Backed with "Take Their Lives" and "Awakening of the Gods"
1988	Out of the Dark... Into the Light: Label: Noise; Formats: CD, CS, LP	Later reissues of Terrible Certainty feature this EP as bonus tracks
2012	Phantom Antichrist	Track 3 is from the single Civilization Collapse (2012); Tracks 5 and 6 are from the Gods of Violence bonus CD/DVD/Blu-Ray and were recorded live at Wacken Open Air in 2014
2016	Violence Unleashed: Label: Nuclear Blast; Formats: CD, DI	Track 1 is from the album Gods of Violence (2017); Tracks 2 and 4 are originally Bonus Songs taken from the album Phantom Antichrist (2012); Track 3 is taken from the single "Civilization Collapse". It was also recorded for a compilation inspired by the horror novel series Geisterjäger John Sinclair; Tracks 5 and 6 are taken from the upcoming "Gods of Violence" bonus CD/DVD/Blu-ray and were recorded live at Wacken Open Air 2014

== Singles ==
Year	Song	Album
1987	"Behind the Mirror"	Terrible Certainty
1989	"Betrayer"	Extreme Aggression
1995	"Isolation"	Cause for Conflict
1995	"Lost"	Cause for Conflict
1997	"Leave This World Behind"	Outcast
1999	"Chosen Few"	Endorama
2012	"Phantom Antichrist"	Phantom Antichrist
2020	"666 - World Divided"	-

== Music videos ==
Year	Song	Director(s)
1988	"Toxic Trace"	B. Kopec/Martin Smits
1989	"Betrayer"	Steve Payne
1990	"People of the Lie"	Andreas Marschall
1990	"Coma of Souls"	Andreas Marschall
1990	"Terror Zone"	Andreas Marschall
1990	"World Beyond"	Andreas Marschall
1990	"Twisted Urges"	Andreas Marschall
1990	"When the Sun Burns Red	Andreas Marschall
1992	"Renewal"	Tsion Meitall
1995	"Lost"	Tanara Jordan
1995	"Isolation"	Andreas Marschall, Heiner Thimm (as Tim Luna)
1997	"Leave This World Behind"	Dirk Rudolph, Harald Hoffmann
1999	"Endorama"	Matthias Kollek
1999	"Chosen Few"	Andreas Marschall
2001	"Violent Revolution"	Stefan Browatzki
2005	"Impossible Brutality"	Stefan Browatzki
2005	"Dystopia"	
2006	"Enemy of God"	Jörn Heitmann
2009	"Hordes of Chaos"	Jörn Heitmann
2010	"Destroy What Destroys You"	Carlos Toro
2011	"War Curse" (live)	Unknown
2012	"Phantom Antichrist"	Grupa13
2012	"Civilization Collapse"	
2016	"Gods of Violence"	Grupa13
2016	"Satan Is Real"	
2017	"Totalitarian Terror"	Grupa 13
2017	"Fallen Brother"	
2017	"Hail to the Hordes"	
2020	"666 - World Divided"	
2022	"Hate Über Alles"	Grupa 13
2022	"Strongest of the Strong"	Tom Schlagkamp
2022	"Midnight Sun"	Tom Schlagkamp
