= Past Life Trauma (1985–1992) =

Compilation album by Kreator
- Released: 26 May 2000
- Recorded: 1985–1992
- Genre: Thrash metal
- Length: 78:12
- Label: Noise Records

Kreator chronology
Endorama (1999)	Past Life Trauma (1985–1992) (2000)	Violent Revolution (2001)

Professional ratings
Review scores
Source	Rating
AllMusic	4.5/5 stars

Past Life Trauma (1985–1992) is a compilation album by German thrash metal band Kreator, compiled by lead singer/guitarist Mille Petrozza. It was released in 2000 by Noise Records. Tracks are taken from the albums recorded between 1985 (Endless Pain) and 1992 (Renewal). Track 5, 8, 9 and 15 are rare tracks.

== Track listing ==
1. "Betrayer" (from Extreme Aggression) – 4:00
2. "Pleasure to Kill" (from Pleasure to Kill) – 4:10
3. "When the Sun Burns Red" (from Coma of Souls) – 5:31
4. "Endless Pain" (from Endless Pain) – 3:31
5. "Winter Martyrium" (live in Lichtenfels) – 6:12
6. "Flag of Hate" (from Endless Pain) – 3:55
7. "Extreme Aggression" (from Extreme Aggression) – 4:43
8. "After the Attack" – 3:44 (Previously Only Available on Sounds•Waves 1 a 4 Track 7" EP free with Sounds Magazine in 1988)
9. "Trauma" (from Renewal demo) – 5:11
10. "People of the Lie" (from Coma of Souls) – 3:16
11. "Renewal" (from Renewal) – 4:33
12. "Terrible Certainty" (from Terrible Certainty) – 4:28
13. "Love Us or Hate Us" (from Extreme Aggression) – 3:43
14. "Total Death" (from Endless Pain) – 3:26
15. "Europe After the Rain" (live) – 4:26
16. "Under the Guillotine" (from Pleasure to Kill) – 4:39
17. "Terror Zone" (from Coma of Souls) – 5:55
18. "Tormentor" (from Endless Pain) – 2:55

== Credits ==
=== Kreator ===
- Mille Petrozza – lead vocals, rhythm guitar
- Frank "Blackfire" Gosdzik – lead guitar
- Rob Fioretti – bass
- Ventor – drums, additional vocals
- Jörg "Tritze" Trzebiatowski – lead guitar (tracks 1, 7, 12 and 13)

== Production ==
- Kreator – photography
- Maren/Noise Graphics – design
- Andreas Marschall – cover art
- Mille Petrozza – liner notes, compilation
- Harry Pilkerton – photography
- Digitally remastered at TTM Mastering, Berlin, Germany in March 2000
