= Scenarios of Violence =

Compilation album by Kreator
- Released: 29 May 1996
- Recorded: 1987–1992
- Genre: Thrash metal
- Length: 65:17
- Label: Noise
- Producer: Siggi Bemm

Kreator chronology
Cause for Conflict (1995)	Scenarios of Violence (1996)	Outcast (1997)

Professional ratings
Review scores
Source	Rating
AllMusic	3/5 stars
Collector's Guide to Heavy Metal	6/10

Scenarios of Violence is a compilation album by German thrash metal band Kreator, released in 1996 through Noise Records. The collection features two previously unreleased songs.

Tracks 2, 4, 6, 7, 9, 11, 13, 15 and 16 are remixed by Siggi Bemm & Mille Petrozza. Tracks 3, 8, 9, 10 and 12 are digitally remastered by Siggi Bemm. The live tracks were recorded at the Dynamo club, Eindhoven, Netherlands in 1988.

== Track listing ==
1. "Suicide in Swamps" (previously unreleased) – 5:09
2. "Renewal" (from Renewal) – 4:25
3. "Extreme Aggression" (from Extreme Aggression) – 4:41
4. "Brainseed" (from Renewal) – 3:07
5. "Terror Zone" (from Coma of Souls) – 5:52
6. "Ripping Corpse" (Live) – 4:19
7. "Tormentor" (Live) – 2:33
8. "Some Pain Will Last" (from Extreme Aggression) – 5:37
9. "Toxic Trace" (from Terrible Certainty) – 5:09
10. "People Of The Lie" (from Coma of Souls) – 3:12
11. "Depression Unrest" (from Renewal) – 3:57
12. "Coma of Souls" (from Coma of Souls) – 4:19
13. "Europe after the Rain" (from Renewal) – 3:13
14. "Limits of Liberty" (previously unreleased) – 1:39
15. "Terrible Certainty" (from Terrible Certainty) – 4:17
16. "Karmic Wheel" (from Renewal) – 6:07

The US version contains a slightly different track-listing. Track 5 is "Lost" from Cause for Conflict, track 10 is "Isolation" also from Cause for Conflict and track 12 is "Agents of Brutality" from Coma of Souls.

== Personnel ==
Kreator

- Mille Petrozza – vocals, rhythm guitar
- Jörge Trzebiatowski – lead guitar
- Frank Gosdzik – lead guitar
- Rob Fioretti – bass
- Christian Giesler – bass
- Jürgen Reil – drums
- Joe Cangelosi – drums

Production

- Mille Petrozza – remixing, cover art concept, cover design
- Siggi Bemm – production, engineering, sampling, remixing, digital remastering
- Randy Burns – engineering, original engineering
- Harris Johns – engineering, original engineering
- Tom Morris – engineering, original engineering
- Roy Rowland – engineering, original engineering
- Peter Dell – cover art concept, illustrations, cover design, cover illustration
- Stoney – photography
