= Voices of Transgression – A 90s Retrospective =

Compilation album by Kreator
- Released: 1999
- Genre: Thrash metal; industrial metal; gothic metal
- Length: 65:01
- Label: GUN
- Compiler: Mille Petrozza

Kreator chronology
Endorama (1999)	Voices of Transgression – A 90s Retrospective (1999)	Past Life Trauma (1985–1992) (2000)

Professional ratings
Review scores
Source	Rating
AllMusic	4/5 stars
Collector's Guide to Heavy Metal	5/10

Voices of Transgression – A 90s Retrospective is a compilation album by German thrash metal band Kreator. It was released in 1999 by GUN Records. This "best of" collection, compiled by Mille Petrozza, includes only songs from the band's albums recorded in the 1990s and features three previously unreleased songs: "Inferno", "As We Watch the West" and "Lucretia (My Reflection)" which was originally written and performed by The Sisters of Mercy.

== Track listing ==
1. "Lucretia (My Reflection)" (The Sisters of Mercy cover) (previously unreleased) – 5:23
2. "Chosen Few" (from Endorama) – 4:31
3. "Isolation" (Edit) (from "Cause for Conflict") – 4:15
4. "Leave This World Behind" (from Outcast) – 3:30
5. "Golden Age" (from Endorama) – 4:51
6. "Bomb Threat" (from Cause for Conflict) – 1:47
7. "Phobia" (from Outcast) – 3:22
8. "Whatever It May Take" (from Outcast) – 3:49
9. "Renewal" (from Renewal) – 4:40
10. "Lost" (from Cause for Conflict) – 3:34
11. "Hate Inside Your Head" (from Cause for Conflict) – 3:40
12. "Inferno" (previously unreleased) – 2:28
13. "Outcast" (from Outcast) – 4:52
14. "State Oppression" (Raw Power cover) (from Cause for Conflict) – 1:38
15. "Endorama" (from Endorama) – 3:21
16. "Black Sunrise" (from Outcast) – 4:31
17. "As We Watch the West" (previously only available as the bonus track on the Japanese edition of Outcast) – 4:57
