= Live Kreation =

2003 live album by Kreator

Live album by Kreator
- Released: 23 June 2003
- Recorded: 24 November 2001 – 1 September 2002
- Genre: Thrash metal
- Length: 103:09
- Label: Steamhammer/SPV
- Producer: Mille Petrozza

Kreator chronology
Violent Revolution (2001)	Live Kreation (2003)	Enemy of God (2005)

Professional ratings
Review scores
Source	Rating
AllMusic	4/5 stars
AllMusic	(limited edition)

Live Kreation is a two-disc live album by German thrash metal band Kreator. Released in 2003 by Steamhammer Records it contains 24 tracks recorded at various points during the band's extensive 2001/2002 tour. A limited edition digibook was also released featuring exclusive 36 pages deluxe color booklet with liner notes by Paul Stenning. It was also released as limited boxset containing this 2CD, a poster and the DVD Live Kreation: Revisioned Glory.

== Track listing ==
=== Disc 1 ===
1. "The Patriarch" – 1:08
2. "Violent Revolution" – 5:06
3. "Reconquering the Throne" – 4:50
4. "Extreme Aggression" – 4:09
5. "People of the Lie" – 3:16
6. "All of the Same Blood (Unity)" – 5:53
7. "Phobia" – 3:26
8. "Pleasure to Kill" – 2:48
9. "Renewal" – 3:59
10. "Servant in Heaven – King in Hell" – 5:08
11. "Black Sunrise" – 4:41
12. "Terrible Certainty" – 4:45
13. "Riot of Violence" – 5:46

=== Disc 2 ===
1. "Lost" – 3:50
2. "Coma of Souls" – 5:02
3. "Second Awakening" – 4:50
4. "Terror Zone" – 6:11
5. "Betrayer" – 4:50
6. "Leave This World Behind" – 3:27
7. "Under the Guillotine" – 4:48
8. "Awakening of the Gods" – 3:17
9. "Golden Age" – 4:38
10. "Flag of Hate" – 3:22
11. "Tormentor" – 3:55

== Credits ==
=== Kreator ===
- Mille Petrozza – lead vocals, rhythm guitar
- Sami Yli-Sirniö – lead guitar, backing vocals
- Christian Giesler – bass, backing vocals
- Ventor – drums, co-lead vocals on 'Riot of Violence'

=== Production ===
- Mille Petrozza – production, concept
- Pit Bender – engineering
- Jamie Cavenagh – drums
- Peter Csodanczi – guitars
- Howard Davis – drums
- Schlanky Jörg "Schrörg" Düsedau – tour management
- Jason Engel – tour management
- Andy Ernst – merchandising
- Chris Gräf – lighting
- Andreas Marschall – cover painting
- Paul Stenning – liner notes
- Martino Müller – lighting
- Derek Murphy – engineering
- Phil Rasmussen – guitars
- Brain S. Reilly – engineering
- Uwe Sabirowsky – engineering
- Jörg Sahm – lighting
- Dirk Schelpmeier – art direction, design
- Andy Sneap – mixing
- Marc Vanvoorden – drums
- Ulrich Weitz – drums
- Scott Wilson – merchandising
- Jörg Zaske – tour management
