= Enemy of God =

Enemy of God can refer to:

- Enemy of God (album), an album by Kreator
- Enemy of God (novel), a novel by Bernard Cornwell

== See also ==
- Moharebeh, Iranian designation for "enemy of God"
