= Dying Alive =

2013 live album by Kreator

Live album by Kreator
- Released: 30 August 2013
- Recorded: 22 December 2012
- Venue: Turbinenhalle (Oberhausen, Germany)
- Genre: Thrash metal
- Length: 114:48
- Label: Nuclear Blast
- Producer: Mille Petrozza

Kreator chronology
Phantom Antichrist (2012)	Dying Alive (2013)	Gods of Violence (2017)

Professional ratings
Review scores
Source	Rating
Blabbermouth.net	9.5/10

Dying Alive is a two-disc live album by German thrash metal band Kreator. Released in 2013 by Nuclear Blast, it contains 24 tracks recorded at Turbinehalle in Oberhausen. It was also released as a deluxe edition containing the two-CD set and a DVD.

== Track listing ==
CD I: Live in Oberhausen
No.	Title	Length
1.	"Intro: Mars Mantra"	1:25
2.	"Phantom Antichrist"	4:35
3.	"From Flood to Fire"	5:49
4.	"Enemy of God"	6:06
5.	"Phobia"	3:31
6.	"Hordes of Chaos"	5:17
7.	"Civilization Collapse"	4:04
8.	"Voices of the Dead"	5:09
9.	"Extreme Aggressions"	4:31
10.	"People of the Lie"	3:19
11.	"Death to the World"	5:12
12.	"Coma of Souls (Intro)"	0:39
13.	"Endless Pain"	3:27
14.	"Pleasure to Kill"	4:13

CD II: Live in Oberhausen + bonus
No.	Title	Length
1.	"Intro II: The Patriarch"	0:56
2.	"Violent Revolution"	7:36
3.	"United in Hate"	3:49
4.	"Betrayer"	4:15
5.	"Flag of Hate / Tormentor"	7:16
6.	"Intro: The Pestilence" (bonus track)	13:28
7.	"Amok Run" (bonus track)	4:28
8.	"Demon Prince" (bonus track)	5:29
9.	"When the Sun Burns Red" (bonus track)	5:53
10.	"Warcurse" (bonus track)	4:23

DVD: Dying Alive
No.	Title	Length
1.	"Intro: Mars Mantra"
2.	"Phantom Antichrist"
3.	"From Flood to Fire"
4.	"Enemy of God"
5.	"Phobia"
6.	"Hordes of Chaos"
7.	"Civilization Collapse"
8.	"Voices of the Dead"
9.	"Extreme Aggressions"
10.	"People of the Lie"
11.	"Death to the World"
12.	"Endless Pain"
13.	"Pleasure to Kill"
14.	"Intro II: The Patriarch"
15.	"Violent Revolution"
16.	"United in Hate"
17.	"Betrayer"
18.	"Flag of Hate"
19.	"Tormentor"
20.	"Outro / Credits"

== Personnel ==
Kreator

- Mille Petrozza – lead vocals, rhythm guitar
- Sami Yli-Sirniö – lead guitar, backing vocals
- Christian Giesler – bass, backing vocals
- Ventor – drums

Technical personnel

- Mille Petrozza – production
- Dominic Paraskevopoulos – sound production, recording
- Tim Neumann – sound production, recording
- Jens Bogren – mixing, mastering
- Tony Lindgren – mixing, mastering
- Jan Meininghaus – graphics, cover art

== Chart positions ==
Chart (2013)	Peak position
Belgian Albums (Ultratop Wallonia)	142
French Albums (SNEP)	170
German Albums (Offizielle Top 100)	9
Hungarian Albums (MAHASZ)	25
