= Flag of Hate =

EP by Kreator
- Released: 1987
- Recorded: 1986
- Studios: Phoenix Studio (Bochum, Germany)
- Genre: Thrash metal
- Length: 17:55
- Label: Noise
- Producer: Ralf Hubert

Kreator chronology
Pleasure to Kill (1986)	Flag of Hate (1987)	Terrible Certainty (1987)

Professional ratings
Review scores
Source	Rating
AllMusic	2/5 stars
Collector's Guide to Heavy Metal	6/10

Flag of Hate is the first EP by German thrash metal band Kreator, released in 1987. It is also included on the 2000 reissue of the Pleasure to Kill album. The US version included three bonus tracks—"Endless Pain," "Tormentor," and "Total Death"—all from Endless Pain. A less common reissue of Pleasure to Kill has all six as bonus tracks.

The song "Awakening of the Gods" was featured in the 2009 video game Grand Theft Auto IV: The Lost and Damned.

== Track listing ==
No.	Title	Music	Length
1.	"Flag of Hate"	Fioretti, Petrozza, Reil	3:56
2.	"Take Their Lives"	Petrozza	6:26
3.	"Awakening of the Gods"	Petrozza	7:33

== Personnel ==
- Mille Petrozza – guitars, vocals
- Rob Fioretti – bass
- Jürgen "Ventor" Reil – drums
