= Out of the Dark... Into the Light =

EP by Kreator
- Released: 1988
- Recorded: May 1988 (studio tracks) and 31 May 1988 (live tracks)
- Venue: Dynamo Club, Eindhoven, Netherlands
- Studio: Musiclab, Berlin
- Genre: Thrash metal
- Length: 24:36
- Label: Noise
- Producer: Harris Johns, Kreator

Kreator chronology
Terrible Certainty (1987)	Out of the Dark... Into the Light (1988)	Extreme Aggression (1989)

Professional ratings
Review scores
Source	Rating
AllMusic	1.5/5 stars
Collector's Guide to Heavy Metal	5/10
Kerrang!	5/5 stars

Out of the Dark... Into the Light is the second EP by German thrash metal band Kreator, released in 1988. The live tracks were recorded at Dynamo Club in Eindhoven, Netherlands in 1988. Late 1990s reissues of Terrible Certainty album feature this EP as bonus material.

The early American version came in a 12" cardboard box.

== Track listing ==
No.	Title	Length
1.	"Impossible to Cure"	2:41
2.	"Lambs to the Slaughter" (Raven cover)	3:34
3.	"Terrible Certainty" (live)	5:19
4.	"Riot of Violence" (live)	5:48
5.	"Awakening of the Gods" (live)	7:13

Bonus tracks (1992 reissue)
No.	Title	Length
6.	"Flag of Hate" (live in East Berlin, 4 March 1990)	3:52
7.	"Love Us or Hate Us" (live in East Berlin, 4 March 1990)	4:36
8.	"Behind the Mirror" (live in East Berlin, 4 March 1990)	4:45
Total length:		37:38

The American vinyl version swaps the order of the studio tracks (one and two) and the live tracks (three to five), and adds a sixth track, "Gangland", a Tygers of Pan Tang cover.

== Personnel ==
Kreator

- Mille Petrozza – lead vocals, rhythm guitar
- Jörg "Tritze" Trzebiatowski – lead guitar
- Rob Fioretti – bass
- Ventor – drums, backing vocals

Production

- Harris Johns – production, mixing
- Kreator – production
- Phil Lawrence – paintings, cover painting
- Manfred Eisenblatter, Buffo Schnädelbach – photography
