= Endorama =

Studio album by Kreator
- Released: 20 April 1999
- Recorded: 25 October 1998 – 18 January 1999
- Studio: Powerplay and Hithead Studios, Switzerland, Principal Studios, Germany
- Genre: Gothic metal
- Length: 50:05
- Label: Drakkar (Germany); Pavement (US); Victor (Japan)
- Producer: Mille Petrozza, Tommy Vetterli

Kreator chronology
Outcast (1997)	Endorama (1999)	Voices of Transgression – A 90s Retrospective (1999)

Endorama is the ninth studio album by German thrash metal band Kreator, released on 20 April, 1999 by Drakkar Records. The gothic metal influences were the most prominent on this release, and Lacrimosa frontman Tilo Wolff provided guest vocals on the title song.

This is the final Kreator album to feature Tommy Vetterli, who was replaced by current guitarist Sami Yli-Sirniö shortly before the recording of their next album Violent Revolution.

Professional ratings
Review scores
Source	Rating
AllMusic	2.5/5 stars
Collector's Guide to Heavy Metal	4/10
Rock Hard	8.5/10

== Track listing ==
All music by Mille Petrozza and Tommy Vetterli, except tracks 6, 8, 9, 11, 12, 13 by Mille Petrozza. All lyrics by Petrozza

No.	Title	Length
1.	"Golden Age"	4:51
2.	"Endorama"	3:20
3.	"Shadowland"	4:27
4.	"Chosen Few"	4:30
5.	"Everlasting Flame"	5:23
6.	"Passage to Babylon"	4:24
7.	"Future King"	4:44
8.	"Entry"	1:05
9.	"Soul Eraser"	4:30
10.	"Willing Spirit"	4:36
11.	"Pandemonium"	4:10
12.	"Tyranny"	4:00

Japanese edition bonus track
No.	Title	Length
13.	"Children of a Lesser God"	3:33
Total length:		53:38

== Personnel ==
Kreator

- Mille Petrozza – vocals, rhythm guitar
- Tommy Vetterli – lead guitar, guitar synth, programming
- Christian Giesler – bass
- Ventor – drums

Additional musicians

- Tilo Wolff – guest vocals on track 2
- Christian Wolf – orchestral arrangements on tracks 5 and 8

Production

- Mille Petrozza – production, cover art, concept, design
- Tommy Vetterli – production
- Detti Mohrmann, Jörg Sahm, Kalle Trapp – pre-production engineering at KKS Studios, Essen and at Mohrmann Studios, Bochum, Germany.
- Britta Kühlmann, Gudrun Laos, Jörg Steinfadt – engineering
- Roland Kupferschmied – engineering, additional programming
- Dawo – assistant engineering
- Gudrun Laos – vocal coach and production
- Ronald Prent – mixing at Wisseloord Studios, Hilversum, Netherlands
- Hendrik Ostrak – assistant mixing
- Rene Schardt – mastering
- Peter Dell – design, concept, cover art
- Markus Mayer – artwork, cover art

== Charts ==
2022 chart performance for Endorama
Chart (2022)	Peak position
German Albums (Offizielle Top 100)	6
