= Gods of Violence =

2017 studio album by Kreator

Studio album by Kreator
- Released: 27 January 2017
- Recorded: 2016
- Genres: Thrash metal, melodic death metal
- Length: 51:43
- Label: Nuclear Blast
- Producer: Jens Bogren

Kreator chronology
Dying Alive (2013)	Gods of Violence (2017)	Hate Über Alles (2022)

Gods of Violence is the fourteenth studio album by German thrash metal band Kreator, released on 27 January 2017. It is the band's final studio album with bassist Christian "Speesy" Giesler before his departure from the band in 2019.

== Background ==
It was the band's first studio album in almost five years since 2012's Phantom Antichrist, marking the longest gap between two studio albums, until Hate Über Alles broke this record in 2022. A music video for the album's title track was released on 18 November 2016. Special editions of the album were released with a bonus Blu-ray/DVD of Kreator's performance at Wacken 2014.

== Reception ==
Professional ratings
Aggregate scores
Source	Rating
Metacritic	73/100
Review scores
Source	Rating
All About the Rock	10/10
AllMusic	4/5 stars
Blabbermouth.net	8/10
Metal Injection	9.5/10
Pitchfork	6.2/10
Terrorizer	8.5/10

Gods of Violence received positive reviews upon its release. Writing for All About the Rock, Fraser Wilson said: "With this record, Kreator have created a slab of truly eviscerating aural perfection. Thrash may have been born in San Francisco's Bay Area, but it was perfected in Essen."

Gods of Violence debuted at number one on the German charts, making it Kreator's first number one debut in their 32-year recording career. The album won a 2017 Metal Storm Award for Best Thrash Metal Album.

== Track listing ==
All lyrics are written by Mille Petrozza except where noted; all music is composed by Kreator.

No.	Title	Lyrics	Length
1.	"Apocalypticon" (instrumental)		1:06
2.	"World War Now"		4:28
3.	"Satan Is Real"	Petrozza, Jäger	4:38
4.	"Totalitarian Terror"		4:45
5.	"Gods of Violence"		5:51
6.	"Army of Storms"		5:09
7.	"Hail to the Hordes"		4:02
8.	"Lion with Eagle Wings"		5:22
9.	"Fallen Brother"	Petrozza, Jäger	4:37
10.	"Side by Side"		4:19
11.	"Death Becomes My Light"		7:26
Total length:			51:43

Japanese edition bonus track
No.	Title	Length
12.	"Earth Under the Sword"	3:29

Bonus CD/DVD/Blu-ray: Live at Wacken 2014
No.	Title	Length
1.	"Mars Mantra"	1:19
2.	"Phantom Antichrist"	4:38
3.	"From Flood into Fire"	6:33
4.	"Warcurse"	6:27
5.	"Endless Pain"	3:25
6.	"Pleasure to Kill"	4:12
7.	"Hordes of Chaos"	5:42
8.	"Phobia"	5:15
9.	"Enemy of God"	6:02
10.	"Civilization Collapse"	4:10
11.	"The Patriarch"	0:52
12.	"Violent Revolution"	6:54
13.	"United in Hate"	8:08
14.	"Flag of Hate/Tormentor"	7:19
Total length:		70:56

Mailorder edition second bonus CD: Alternative Version
No.	Title	Length
1.	"World War Now" (demo)	4:19
2.	"Satan Is Real" (demo)	4:24
3.	"Gods of Violence" (demo)	6:16
4.	"Lion with Eagle Wings" (demo)	5:56
5.	"Death Becomes My Light" (demo)	7:03
Total length:		27:58

== Credits ==
Writing, performance and production credits are adapted from the album liner notes.

Kreator

- Mille Petrozza – vocals, rhythm guitar
- Sami Yli-Sirniö – lead guitar
- Christian Giesler – bass
- Ventor – drums

Additional musicians

- Boris Pfeiffer (In Extremo) – bagpipes on "Hails to the Hordes"
- Tekla-Li Wadensten – harp; intro piece on "Gods of Violence"
- Dagobert Jäger – German vocals on "Fallen Brother"

Choir

- Ronny Milianowicz
- Björn Kromm
- Frederik Eriksson
- Henrik Andersoon
- Mattias Lövdahl
- Lars Höjer
- Jens Bogren

Arrangements

- Kreator – arrangement
- Francesco Paoli – orchestral arrangement
- Francesco Ferrini – orchestral arrangement

Production

- Jens Bogren – production, recording, mixing
- David Castillo – additional engineering
- Erik Mjörnell – additional engineering
- Christoffer Wadensten – engineering (harp only)
- Ronny Milianowicz – recording (choir only)
- Ludwig Näsvall – drumtech
- Urban Näsvall – drumtech
- Linus Corneliusson – mixing assistance, editing
- Tony Lindgren – mastering
- Olman Viper – mastering
- Marc Görtz (Caliban) – pre-production
- Dominic Paraskevopoulos – Pre-production

Studios

- Fascination Street Studios, Sweden – production, recording, mixing, mastering
- Studio Seven, Örebro, Sweden – recording (choir only)
- Nemesis Studios, Germany – pre-production
- Level 3 – pre-production
- Hertzwerk, Hamburg, Germany – mastering

== Charts ==
Chart (2017)	Peak position
Australian Albums (ARIA)	30
Austrian Albums (Ö3 Austria)	4
Belgian Albums (Ultratop Flanders)	20
Belgian Albums (Ultratop Wallonia)	46
Canadian Albums (Billboard)	90
Czech Albums (ČNS IFPI)	7
Dutch Albums (Album Top 100)	58
Finnish Albums (Suomen virallinen lista)	7
French Albums (SNEP)	59
German Albums (Offizielle Top 100)	1
Hungarian Albums (MAHASZ)	5
Japanese Albums (Oricon)	55
Polish Albums (ZPAV)	21
Portuguese Albums (AFP)	33
Scottish Albums (Official Charts)	37
Spanish Albums (PROMUSICAE)	28
Swedish Albums (Sverigetopplistan)	19
Swiss Albums (Schweizer Hitparade)	13
UK Albums (Official Charts)	72
UK Independent Albums (Official Charts)	7
UK Rock & Metal Albums (Official Charts)	2
US Billboard 200	118
US Independent Albums (Billboard)	8
US Top Hard Rock Albums (Billboard)	6
US Top Rock Albums (Billboard)	19
