= Krushers of the World =

Studio album by Kreator
- Released: 16 January 2026
- Recorded: 2025
- Genres: Thrash metal, melodic death metal
- Length: 44:23
- Label: Nuclear Blast
- Producer: Jens Bogren

Kreator chronology
Hate Über Alles (2022)	Krushers of the World (2026)

Singles from Krushers of the World
- 1. "Seven Serpents" Released: 26 September 2025; 2. "Tränenpalast" Released: 31 October 2025; 3. "Satanic Anarchy" Released: 5 December 2025; 4. "Krushers of the World" Released: 16 January 2026

Krushers of the World is the sixteenth studio album by German thrash metal band Kreator, released on 16 January 2026. Five singles were released to support this album: "Seven Serpents", "Tränenpalast", "Satanic Anarchy", "Krushers of the World" and "Loyal to the Grave".

== Track listing ==
All music by Kreator and Andy Posdziech, all lyrics by Miland Petrozza.

No.	Title	Length
1.	"Seven Serpents"	4:40
2.	"Satanic Anarchy"	3:33
3.	"Krushers of the World"	4:20
4.	"Tränenpalast" (featuring Britta Görtz)	4:43
5.	"Barbarian"	4:40
6.	"Blood of Our Blood"	4:31
7.	"Combatants"	4:01
8.	"Psychotic Imperator"	5:05
9.	"Deathscream"	3:52
10.	"Loyal to the Grave"	4:58
Total length:		44:23

== Credits ==
The album personnel adapted from the CD liner notes.

Kreator

- Mille Petrozza – vocals, rhythm guitar
- Sami Yli-Sirniö – lead guitar
- Frédéric Leclercq – bass
- Ventor – drums

Guest musicians

- Britta Görtz – vocals on track 4 and 9

Production

- Jens Bogren – production, mixing
- Johan Martin – assistant mixing
- Andy Posdziech – pre-production, additional writing, arrangements
- Tony Lindgren – mastering
- Zbigniew M. Bielak – cover art

== Charts ==
Chart performance for Krushers of the World
Chart (2026)	Peak position
Australian Albums (ARIA)	51
Austrian Albums (Ö3 Austria)	2
Belgian Albums (Ultratop Flanders)	11
Belgian Albums (Ultratop Wallonia)	21
Dutch Albums (Album Top 100)	96
Finnish Albums (Suomen virallinen lista)	8
French Albums (SNEP)	64
French Rock & Metal Albums (SNEP)	3
German Albums (Offizielle Top 100)	2
German Rock & Metal Albums (Offizielle Top 100)	1
Hungarian Physical Albums (MAHASZ)	38
Japanese Albums (Oricon)	30
Japanese Download Albums (Billboard Japan)	79
Japanese Rock Albums (Oricon)	4
Japanese Top Albums Sales (Billboard Japan)	34
Polish Albums (ZPAV)	4
Scottish Albums (Official Charts)	11
Spanish Albums (Promusicae)	58
Swedish Albums (Sverigetopplistan)	7
Swedish Hard Rock Albums (Sverigetopplistan)	1
Swiss Albums (Schweizer Hitparade)	15
UK Albums Sales (OCC)	12
UK Independent Albums (Official Charts)	5
UK Rock & Metal Albums (Official Charts)	1
US Top Current Album Sales (Billboard)	27
