= Hordes of Chaos =

2009 studio album by Kreator

- Cover art by Joachim Luetke

Studio album by Kreator
- Released: 13 January 2009
- Recorded: July–August 2008 at Titonus Studios in Germany
- Genre: Thrash metal
- Length: 38:27
- Label: SPV/Steamhammer
- Producer: Moses Schneider

Kreator chronology
Enemy of God (2005)	Hordes of Chaos (2009)	Phantom Antichrist (2012)

Alternative cover
- Artwork for LP edition

Professional ratings
Review scores
Source	Rating
AllMusic	3.5/5 stars
Blabbermouth.net	9.5/10 stars
IGN	8.5/10 stars
Jukebox:Metal	5/5 stars
Metal Hammer	№ 188

Hordes of Chaos is the twelfth studio album by German thrash metal band Kreator, released in 2009.

It has been described as their most organic album to date because, barring vocals, guitar solos and some melodies, the album was recorded in a live setting on an analog tape recorder with few overdubs. Frontman Mille Petrozza noted that this was the first time they had recorded an album this way since Pleasure to Kill in 1986.

He described the album as "it combines the best moments of our back catalogue with the intensity and experience of 2009". Hordes of Chaos also marked the first time since its inception that Kreator had not changed their lineup after at least two albums.

The album was released in three different formats. The standard edition was issued in a jewel case and featured the 10 album tracks. A deluxe edition features a bonus DVD with a making-of-the-album documentary. The LP version of the album has different artwork from the other versions.

This was the first Kreator album to chart in the United States, debuting at number 165 on the Billboard 200 chart in the US, with first-week sales of approximately 2,800 copies.

== Re-release ==
The album was re-released as the 'Ultra Riot' box set edition in mid-2010. It featured new artwork, extended liner notes by Joel McIver, promo videos, a bonus disc with demo tracks and cover songs and various pieces of memorabilia (such as a photobook, sticker, poster and photo card).

== Track listing ==
All tracks are written by Mille Petrozza.

No.	Title	Length
1.	"Hordes of Chaos (A Necrologue for the Elite)"	5:04
2.	"Warcurse"	4:10
3.	"Escalation"	3:24
4.	"Amok Run"	4:12
5.	"Destroy What Destroys You"	3:13
6.	"Radical Resistance"	3:43
7.	"Absolute Misanthropy"	3:37
8.	"To the Afterborn"	4:53
9.	"Corpses of Liberty (Instrumental)"	0:55
10.	"Demon Prince"	5:16
Total length:		38:27

Bonus DVD
No.	Title	Length
1.	"The Making of Hordes of Chaos" (directed by Stephanie von Beauvais)	19:41

Ultra Riot bonus disc
No.	Title	Length
1.	"Hordes of Chaos" (Demo)	05:11
2.	"Radical Resistance" (Demo)	03:48
3.	"To the Afterborn" (Demo)	05:55
4.	"World Without Religion" ("Escalation" demo)	03:48
5.	"Amok Run" (Demo)	04:18
6.	"Alle gegen alle" (Slime cover)	02:47
7.	"You Are the Government" (Bad Religion cover)	01:11

== Credits ==
Kreator

- Mille Petrozza – vocals, rhythm guitar
- Sami Yli-Sirniö – lead guitar
- Christian Giesler – bass
- Ventor – drums

Production

- Moses Schneider – production
- Colin Richardson – mixing
- Joachim Luetke – artwork

== Charts ==
Chart	Peak position
Austrian Albums (Ö3 Austria)	33
Dutch Albums (Album Top 100)	66
Finnish Albums (Suomen virallinen lista)	16
French Albums (SNEP)	85
German Albums (Offizielle Top 100)	16
Hungarian Albums (MAHASZ)	26
Japanese Albums (Oricon)	163
Swedish Albums (Sverigetopplistan)	47
Swiss Albums (Schweizer Hitparade)	57
UK Rock & Metal Albums (Official Charts)	25
US Billboard 200	165
US Independent Albums (Billboard)	19
US Heatseekers Albums (Billboard)	7
US Top Tastemaker Albums (Billboard)	9
