= Cause for Conflict =

Studio album by Kreator
- Released: 1 August 1995
- Studio: Ocean Studios, Burbank, California
- Genre: Thrash metal
- Length: 47:28
- Label: GUN (Europe); Noise (US)
- Producer: Vincent Wojno, Kreator

Kreator chronology
Renewal (1992)	Cause for Conflict (1995)	Scenarios of Violence (1996)

Singles from Cause for Conflict
- 1. "Lost" Released: 1995; 2. "Isolation" Released: 1995

Professional ratings
Review scores
Source	Rating
AllMusic	3/5 stars
Collector's Guide to Heavy Metal	7/10
Rock Hard	9.5/10

Cause for Conflict is the seventh studio album by German thrash metal band Kreator released on 1 August, 1995.

The album continued the experimentation with industrial music that they started on previous album, Renewal, but brought back more of their thrash metal sound and also saw the band experiment with groove metal. This was the only Kreator album to feature Joe Cangelosi as the replacement of original drummer Jürgen "Ventor" Reil, who would return to the band in 1996. This was also the band's first album to feature bassist Christian Giesler and the last to feature guitarist Frank "Blackfire" Gosdzik.

== Release ==
In March 2018, German heavy metal record label Noise released a remastered edition of the album and made it available on CD and vinyl and as digital download. The release contains three bonus tracks and liner notes.

== Track listing ==
All lyrics are written by Mille Petrozza; all music is composed by Kreator, except "State Oppression", words and music by Raw Power.

No.	Title	Length
1.	"Prevail"	3:59
2.	"Catholic Despot"	3:23
3.	"Progressive Proletarians"	3:24
4.	"Crisis of Disorder"	4:17
5.	"Hate Inside Your Head"	3:39
6.	"Bomb Threat"	1:47
7.	"Men Without God"	3:46
8.	"Lost"	3:35
9.	"Dogmatic Authority"	1:27
10.	"Sculpture of Regret"	2:59
11.	"Celestial Deliverance"	3:15
12.	"Isolation" (The song "Isolation" ends at 4:20. After 4 minutes and 20 seconds of silence begins an untitled hidden song.)	11:54
Total length:		47:28

2018 reissue bonus tracks
No.	Title	Length
13.	"Suicide in Swamps"	5:11
14.	"Limits of Liberty"	1:40
15.	"State Oppression" (Raw Power cover)	1:39

== Personnel ==
Kreator

- Mille Petrozza – vocals, rhythm guitar
- Frank "Blackfire" Gosdzik – lead guitar
- Christian Giesler – bass
- Joe Cangelosi – drums

Production

- Vincent Wojno – production with Kreator, engineering, mixing
- Doug Trantow – assistant engineering
- Mark Uehlein, Steve Warner – studio assistants
- Dirk Rudolph – sleeve design, photography, band photography
- Junior – illustrations

2018 reissue technical personnel

- Steve Hammond – compilation
- Andy Pearce, Matt Worthams – mastering
- Thomas Ewerhard, Jan Meininghaus – art and design
- Alex Solca, Barbara Stiller – additional photos
- Malcolm Dome – sleeve notes

== Charts ==
Chart (1995)	Peak position
German Albums (Offizielle Top 100)	48
