= Violent Revolution =

2001 studio album by Kreator

Studio album by Kreator
- Released: 25 September 2001
- Recorded: February–April 2001, Area 51 and Backstage Studios
- Genre: Thrash metal
- Length: 56:42
- Label: Steamhammer/SPV
- Producer: Andy Sneap

Kreator chronology
Past Life Trauma (1985–1992) (2000)	Violent Revolution (2001)	Live Kreation (2003)

Professional ratings
Review scores
Source	Rating
AllMusic	4/5 stars
Rock Hard	9.5/10
Ultimate Metal Reviews	8.5/10

Violent Revolution is the tenth studio album by German thrash metal band Kreator. It was released on 25 September 2001 and is the band's first album to feature lead guitarist Sami Yli-Sirniö. After almost a decade of musical experimentation with their metal sound (starting with Renewal), with this album the band returned to their 1980s thrash metal style.

Violent Revolution is now considered to be the catalyst of the early 2000s thrash metal revival movement.

== Reception ==
In 2005, Violent Revolution was ranked number 436 in Rock Hard magazine's book The 500 Greatest Rock & Metal Albums of All Time.

== Track listing ==
All tracks are written by Mille Petrozza.

No.	Title	Length
1.	"Reconquering the Throne"	4:13
2.	"The Patriarch"	0:52
3.	"Violent Revolution"	4:55
4.	"All of the Same Blood (Unity)"	6:12
5.	"Servant in Heaven - King in Hell"	5:10
6.	"Second Awakening"	4:48
7.	"Ghetto War"	5:05
8.	"Replicas of Life"	7:34
9.	"Slave Machinery"	3:58
10.	"Bitter Sweet Revenge"	5:25
11.	"Mind on Fire"	3:57
12.	"System Decay"	4:33
Total length:		56:42

Limited digipak edition bonus track
No.	Title	Length
13.	"Violent Revolution" (demo)	5:56
Total length:		62:38

== Personnel ==
Kreator

- Mille Petrozza – vocals, rhythm guitar
- Sami Yli-Sirniö – lead guitar
- Christian Giesler – bass
- Ventor – drums

Production

- Andreas Marschall – cover painting
- Tommy Newton – engineering
- Dirk Schelpmeier – design, photography
- Andy Sneap – production, engineering, mastering, mixing

== Charts ==
Chart performance for Violent Revolution
Chart (2022)	Peak position
German Albums (Offizielle Top 100)	21
