= Outcast (Kreator album) =

Studio album by Kreator
- Released: 22 July 1997
- Studio: Principal Studios (Münster, Germany)
- Genre: Industrial metal; gothic metal
- Length: 47:18
- Label: GUN (Europe); Noise (US and Japan)
- Producer: Vincent Wojno, Kreator

Kreator chronology
Scenarios of Violence (1996)	Outcast (1997)	Endorama (1999)

Professional ratings
Review scores
Source	Rating
AllMusic	2.5/5 stars
Collector's Guide to Heavy Metal	8/10
Rock Hard	9.0/10

Outcast is the eighth studio album by German thrash metal band Kreator. It was released by G.U.N. Records in 1997. This album featured more gothic and industrial influences than earlier Kreator, retaining little of the thrash metal from previous years. Outcast is also Kreator's first album to feature drummer Jürgen "Ventor" Reil since 1992's Renewal, and the first to feature then-former Coroner guitarist Tommy Vetterli.

== Release ==
In March 2018, German record label Noise Records released a remastered edition of the album and made it available on CD and vinyl and as digital download. The release contains a live performance of Kreator at Dynamo Open Air in 1998 and liner notes.

== Track listing ==
All lyrics are written by Mille Petrozza; all music is composed by Kreator.

No.	Title	Length
1.	"Leave This World Behind"	3:29
2.	"Phobia"	3:22
3.	"Forever"	2:52
4.	"Black Sunrise"	4:33
5.	"Nonconformist"	3:15
6.	"Enemy Unseen"	3:21
7.	"Outcast"	4:54
8.	"Stronger than Before"	3:17
9.	"Ruin of Life"	3:53
10.	"Whatever It May Take"	3:47
11.	"Alive Again"	3:47
12.	"Against the Rest"	2:39
13.	"A Better Tomorrow"	4:13
Total length:		47:18

== Personnel ==
Kreator

- Mille Petrozza – vocals, rhythm guitar, programming
- Tommy Vetterli – lead guitar, programming
- Christian Giesler – bass
- Jürgen Reil – drums, programming

Additional musicians

- Christian Loeunhoff – woodblock
- Guido Eickelmann – programming

Production

- Kreator – production
- Vincent Wojno – producer with Kreator, engineer
- Britta Kühlmann – engineer
- Vincent Sorg – assistant engineer, programming
- Jörg Umbrett, Sascha Kramski – assistant engineers
- Romald Prent – mixing at Wisseloord Studios, Hilversum, Netherlands
- Joerg Steineadt – mixing assistant
- Dirk Rudolph – sleeve design
- Harald Hoffmann – cover photos

2018 reissue technical personnel

- Steve Hammond – compilation
- Andy Pearce, Matt Worthams – mastering
- Thomas Ewerhard, Jan Meininghaus – art and design
- Harald Hoffmann – additional photos
- Malcolm Dome – sleeve notes
- Olman Viper – live mastering

== Charts ==
Chart (1999)	Peak position
German Albums (Offizielle Top 100)	91
