= Hate Über Alles =

2022 studio album by Kreator

Studio album by Kreator
- Released: 10 June 2022
- Recorded: 2021
- Studios: Hansa Tonstudio, Berlin, Germany
- Genres: Thrash metal, melodic death metal
- Length: 46:11
- Label: Nuclear Blast
- Producer: Arthur Rizk

Kreator chronology
Gods of Violence (2017)	Hate Über Alles (2022)	Krushers of the World (2026)

Singles from Hate Über Alles
- 1. "Hate Über Alles" Released: 4 February 2022; 2. "Strongest of the Strong" Released: 8 April 2022; 3. "Midnight Sun" Released: 6 May 2022

Professional ratings
Review scores
Source	Rating
Blabbermouth.net	8/10
Classic Rock	3.5/5 stars
Kerrang!	2/5 stars
laut.de	4/5 stars
Metal Injection	9/10
Metal Hammer (DE)	6.5/7 stars
Metal Hammer (GB)	4.5/5 stars
Metal.de	9/10
Rock Hard	9/10
Sputnikmusic	3/5

Hate Über Alles is the fifteenth studio album by German thrash metal band Kreator, which was released on 10 June 2022 through Nuclear Blast. Produced by Arthur Rizk, it is the band's first studio album since Gods of Violence (2017), the longest gap between studio albums in their career, and the first to feature bassist Frédéric Leclercq, who replaced Christian "Speesy" Giesler in 2019.

== Background ==
Kreator's intention to work on a fifteenth studio album was first revealed by vocalist and guitarist Mille Petrozza about three months after the release of Gods of Violence, telling The Metal Voice: "Maybe we should work with a different producer. Maybe we should go to a different country to record the album. Maybe we should write a more metal or more full-on thrash metal. Whatever we feel, first and foremost, that is the most important thing. Time will tell." In a September 2017 interview with Australia's Silver Tiger Media, Petrozza stated that the band could do another album after Gods of Violence but "not yet."

When asked in February 2018 about the future of Kreator, Petrozza stated that he "[did not] wanna wait another five years" for the next album: "I think we're gonna take next year off and write a new record. That's the plan at least. We'll see what happens. I don't put myself under pressure. Let's see how I feel after this tour, and if I have ideas for new music, I will book a studio and start working on demos as soon as I have the time. And then I'll come up with some new stuff." In July of that year, he told Guitar Interactive magazine that Kreator would take 2019 off to focus on writing their fifteenth studio album, with plans to release it in the summer of 2020, though ultimately it was pushed back to 2021.

On 16 September 2019, it was announced that former DragonForce bassist Frédéric Leclercq had joined Kreator as the replacement of Christian "Speesy" Giesler, who had left the band after 25 years as their bassist. Leclercq made his debut with Kreator on the band's 2020 one-off single "666 - World Divided", for which a music video was shot.

== Production ==
Kreator commenced work on their fifteenth studio album during the summer of 2020, and Petrozza confirmed that September he had begun recording vocals. Progress on the album continued into the next year. In March 2021, Petrozza revealed in the podcast of Italy's Metalitalia.com that Kreator was supposed to start recording the album in February, but added that this plan was interrupted by the COVID-19 pandemic. He also went on to say that he wanted "the album to come out and go on a world tour right afterwards" and revealed that Arthur Rizk would produce it. The recording sessions with Rizk began in September 2021 at Hansa Tonstudio in Berlin and were completed by the end of the year.

== Release ==
In December 2021, Petrozza announced on his Instagram page that Kreator's fifteenth studio album would be released in the summer of 2022, preceded by a "new single SOON!". On 4 February 2022, the band released the title track from Hate Über Alles as the album's first single, and announced on the same day that the album would be released on June 3; its release date was later pushed back to 10 June. A video for the album's second single, "Strongest of the Strong", was released on 8 April 2022. The follow-up single, "Midnight Sun", was released on 6 May 2022 and also accompanied by a music video. On 22 May 2023, Kreator released a music video for "Conquer and Destroy", which is a performance footage of the band's performance in Essen that took place two months earlier; unlike the album's previous music videos, "Conquer and Destroy" was not released as a single.

== Track listing ==
All songs written by Mille Petrozza

No.	Title	Length
1.	"Sergio Corbucci Is Dead"	0:58
2.	"Hate Über Alles"	3:48
3.	"Killer of Jesus"	4:05
4.	"Crush the Tyrants"	4:10
5.	"Strongest of the Strong"	4:01
6.	"Become Immortal"	4:23
7.	"Conquer and Destroy"	4:45
8.	"Midnight Sun (featuring Sofia Portanet)"	3:38
9.	"Demonic Future"	4:43
10.	"Pride Comes Before the Fall"	4:48
11.	"Dying Planet"	6:52
Total length:		46:11

== Personnel ==
Kreator

- Mille Petrozza – vocals, rhythm guitar
- Sami Yli-Sirniö – lead guitar
- Frédéric Leclercq – bass
- Ventor – drums

Additional personnel

- Sofia Portanet – backing vocals (track 5), female vocals (track 8)
- Francesco Ferrini – orchestrations (tracks 1, 11)
- Francesco Paoli – orchestrations (tracks 1, 11)
- Arthur Rizk – acoustic guitar (track 1)
- Max Gruber – additional vocals (tracks 1, 7)
- Brendan Radigan – additional vocals (track 7)
- Kian Moghaddamzadeh – keyboards (track 10)
- Matthias Kassner – additional percussion (track 4)
- Marco Ernst – bagpipes (track 6)
- Jake Rogers – choir vocals (track 6)
- Jason Tarpey – choir vocals (track 6)
- Sterling Peck – choir vocals (track 6)
- Levi Jones – choir vocals (track 6)
- Dustin Moore – choir vocals (track 6)
- Holton Grossi – choir vocals (track 6)
- Patrick Baboumian – backing vocals (track 5)

== Charts ==
Chart performance for Hate Über Alles
Chart (2022)	Peak position
Belgian Albums (Ultratop Flanders)	43
Belgian Albums (Ultratop Wallonia)	23
Dutch Albums (Album Top 100)	53
Finnish Albums (Suomen virallinen lista)	4
French Albums (SNEP)	73
German Albums (Offizielle Top 100)	2
Japanese Albums (Oricon)	30
Japanese Hot Albums (Billboard Japan)	36
Polish Albums (ZPAV)	6
Scottish Albums (Official Charts)	9
Spanish Albums (Promusicae)	23
Swiss Albums (Schweizer Hitparade)	7
UK Album Downloads (Official Charts)	59
UK Independent Albums (Official Charts)	1
UK Rock & Metal Albums (Official Charts)	2
