= Sami Yli-Sirniö =

Finnish guitarist (born 1972)

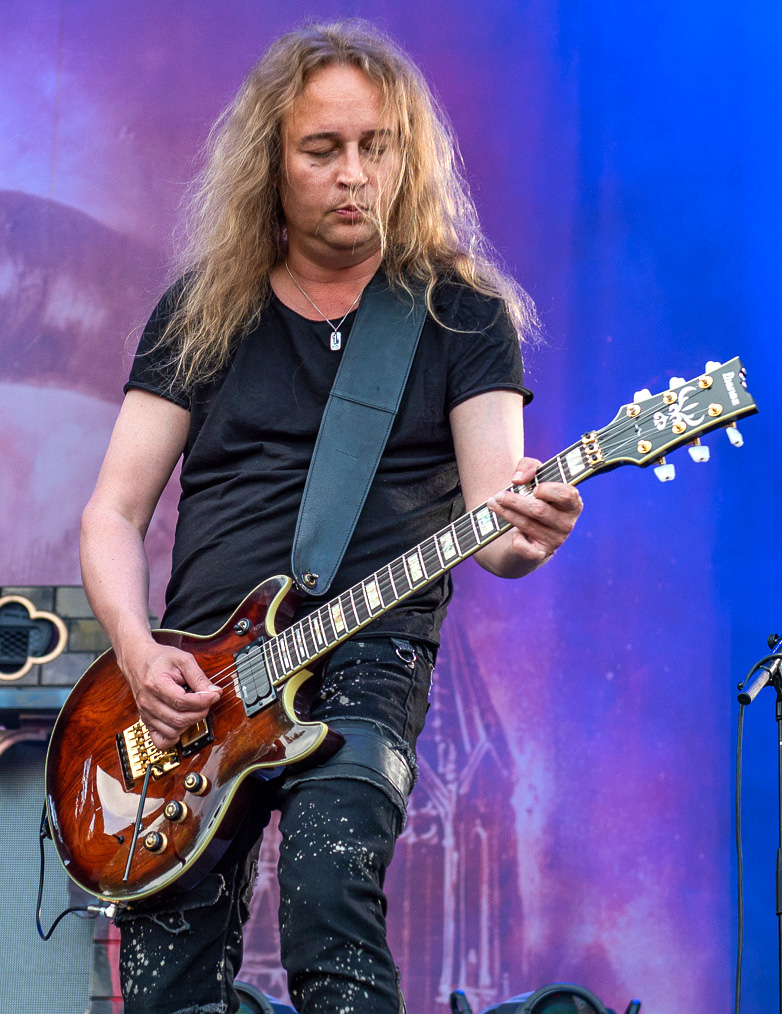
- Yli-Sirniö with Kreator at Rock im Park 2018

Background information
- Born: 10 April 1972 (age 52)
- Origin: Finland
- Genres: Heavy metal; alternative metal; progressive metal; thrash metal; melodic death metal
- Occupation: Guitarist
- Member of: Waltari; Kreator; Barren Earth

Sami Yli-Sirniö (born 10 April 1972) is a Finnish musician who is currently the lead guitarist of the German band Kreator and the Finnish metal bands Waltari and Barren Earth. He spent part of his life in Germany and thus has strong ties with the German metal scene. German Rock Hard magazine featured him in 2007 as a "forgotten guitar hero".

== Career ==
While living in Germany, he served as a session musician for rock band In Rags, gothic act Tiamat, and thrash metal band Grip Inc. For both Tiamat and Grip Inc., he played sitar, his second favourite instrument. Yli-Sirniö is currently endorsed by Ibanez.

=== Waltari (1989–1995, 2001–present) ===
Yli-Sirniö originally joined experimental Finnish crossover legend Waltari in 1989. He left the band in 1995 to live in Germany, returning in 2001. So far he has recorded eight studio albums with Waltari. Yli-Sirniö likes to explore other opportunities and has had many guest appearances with other bands.

=== Kreator (2001–present) ===
He also replaced injured Swiss guitarist Tommy Vetterli (of Coroner fame) on some live dates for Teutonic thrash metal pioneers Kreator.

In 2001, Vetterli departed and Yli-Sirniö was asked to replace him on a permanent basis. To this day, he has appeared on six studio albums with the band: 2001's Violent Revolution, 2005's Enemy of God, 2009's Hordes of Chaos, 2012's Phantom Antichrist, 2017's Gods of Violence and 2022's Hate Über Alles. He also appears on the Live Kreation double-album and DVD, released in 2003 as well as the live album Dying Alive released in 2013.

=== Barren Earth (2007–present) ===
Yli-Sirniö is the lead guitarist in the progressive death metal band Barren Earth, while not officially a supergroup, the band does consist of prominent members of other metal bands such as Jón Aldará of Hamferð, Janne Perttilä of Rytmihäiriö and Moonsorrow, Olli-Pekka "Oppu" Laine of Amorphis.
