= Enemy of God (album) =

2005 studio album by Kreator

- Cover art by Joachim Luetke

Studio album by Kreator
- Released: 10 January 2005
- Recorded: May–July 2004
- Genre: Thrash metal
- Length: 55:48
- Label: SPV/Steamhammer
- Producer: Andy Sneap

Kreator chronology
Live Kreation (2003)	Enemy of God (2005)	Hordes of Chaos (2009)

Alternative cover
- Re-release

Professional ratings
Review scores
Source	Rating
AllMusic	4/5 stars
Classic Rock	4/5 stars
Blabbermouth.net	8/10 stars

Enemy of God is the eleventh studio album by German thrash metal band Kreator, released on 10 January 2005. It was released by SPV/Steamhammer on 10 January in Europe and South America and on 11 January 2005 in North America.

On 27 October 2006, the album was re-released in a digipak under the name Enemy of God: Revisited, with a 5.1 DTS 96/24 mix, featuring two bonus tracks from the Japanese edition and a bonus DVD.

== Track listing ==
All tracks are written by Mille Petrozza.

No.	Title	Length
1.	"Enemy of God"	5:43
2.	"Impossible Brutality"	4:30
3.	"Suicide Terrorist"	3:28
4.	"World Anarchy"	3:55
5.	"Dystopia"	3:41
6.	"Voices of the Dead"	4:33
7.	"Murder Fantasies"	4:50
8.	"When Death Takes Its Dominion"	5:38
9.	"One Evil Comes - A Million Follow"	3:19
10.	"Dying Race Apocalypse"	4:40
11.	"Under a Total Blackened Sky"	4:28
12.	"The Ancient Plague"	6:58
Total length:		55:48

Japanese/Enemy of God: Revisited bonus tracks
No.	Title	Length
13.	"Toxic Trace" (live in Busan, South Korea)	4:07
14.	"Coma of Souls" (live in Busan, Korea)	4:50

Limited edition digipak bonus DVD
No.	Title	Length
1.	"Impossible Brutality" (video clip)
2.	"Making of Impossible Brutality"
3.	"Making of Enemy of God"
4.	"Violent Revolution" (live clip)
5.	"Phobia" (live clip)

Revisited bonus DVD
No.	Title	Length
1.	"Intro" (live Wacken 2005)
2.	"Enemy of God" (live Wacken 2005)
3.	"Impossible Brutality" (live Wacken 2005)
4.	"Pleasure to Kill" (live Wacken 2005)
5.	"Phobia" (live Wacken 2005)
6.	"Violent Revolution" (live Wacken 2005)
7.	"Suicide Terrorist" (live Wacken 2005)
8.	"Extreme Aggression" (live Wacken 2005)
9.	"People of the Lie" (live Wacken 2005)
10.	"Voices of the Dead" (live Wacken 2005)
11.	"Terrible Certainty" (live Wacken 2005)
12.	"Betrayer" (live Wacken 2005)
13.	"Flag of Hate" (live Wacken 2005)
14.	"Tormentor" (live Wacken 2005)
15.	"Reconquering the Throne" (bonus bootleg Live at the Rockpalast)
16.	"Renewal" (bonus bootleg Live at the Rockpalast)
17.	"Servant in Heaven-King in Hell" (bonus bootleg Live at the Rockpalast)
18.	"Making of Enemy of God" (video clip)
19.	"Enemy of God" (video clip)
20.	"Dystopia" (video clip)
21.	"Impossible Brutality" (video clip)
22.	"Dying Race Apocalypse" (video clip)

A limited edition digipak was also released with a bonus DVD (PAL format and a very limited edition with DVD NTSC format in North America).

== Credits ==
Kreator

- Mille Petrozza – vocals, rhythm guitar
- Sami Yli-Sirniö – lead guitar
- Christian Giesler – bass
- Ventor – drums

Guest musicians

- Michael Amott – additional guitar on "Murder Fantasies"

Production

- Andy Sneap – production, mixing
- Joachim Luetke – design, cover art concept
- Harald Hoffmann – photography

== Charts ==
Chart	Peak position
Austrian Albums (Ö3 Austria)	45
Belgian Albums (Ultratop Flanders)	90
French Albums (SNEP)	84
German Albums (Offizielle Top 100)	19
Swedish Albums (Sverigetopplistan)	38
UK Rock & Metal Albums (OCC)	32
