= Extreme Aggression =

Studio album by Kreator
- Released: 19 June 1989
- Recorded: January–February 1989
- Studios: Music Grinder, E.Q. Sound and Cherokee Studios, Hollywood, California
- Genre: Thrash metal
- Length: 37:28
- Labels: Noise (Europe); Epic (US)
- Producer: Randy Burns

Kreator chronology
Out of the Dark... Into the Light (1988)	Extreme Aggression (1989)	Coma of Souls (1990)

Extreme Aggression is the fourth studio album by German thrash metal band Kreator released in 1989. While the band had already gained a sizeable following in the US due to their 1988 tour with the crossover thrash band D.R.I., this album introduced many American fans to Kreator, primarily through heavy rotation of the "Betrayer" music video on MTV's Headbangers Ball, which was partly shot at the Acropolis in Athens, Greece. The beginning of the song "Love Us or Hate Us" was used in an early 1990s promo ad by the Los Angeles radio station KNAC. This was their first album issued in the US by Epic Records. The album was also available on picture disc vinyl.

The album's original artwork was that of a man standing in front of a bathroom mirror looking at the reflection of his face falling off, exposing Kreator's mascot demon underneath. However, it was quickly replaced with a new artwork, depicting an image of the band in front of an orange background.

== Recording and production ==
Extreme Aggression was initially recorded in Germany, but those tapes were abandoned, with lead vocalist Mille Petrozza expressing frustration with the band's guitarist Jörg "Tritze" Trzebiatowski. Petrozza shifted the project to Los Angeles in the US, replacing Tritze with Sodom's guitarist Frank “Blackfire" Gosdzik. The album was recorded from January to February 1989 at the Music Grinder studio in Hollywood, California, with additional recording at E.Q. Sound and Cherokee Studios. Tritze was credited as guitarist on Extreme Aggression but his contributions were not included on the album, and he left the band after its release. Blackfire left Sodom and joined Kreator, playing the Extreme Aggression Tour to support the album.

== Reception ==
Professional ratings
Review scores
Source	Rating
AllMusic	4.5/5 stars
Blabbermouth.net	10/10
Collector's Guide to Heavy Metal	7/10
Metal Rules	5/5 stars
Metal Storm	9.5/10
Rock Hard	7.5/10

=== Critical reception ===
Contemporary reviews were mixed. In its favourable review of the album Billboard wrote, "the playing is very, very tight and drummer Ventor flexes some powerful muscle", while suggesting that "Epic is obviously looking for its own Metallica and this quartet could be it." Frank Trojan of Rock Hard considered Extreme Aggression "a clear step backwards from Terrible Certainty", due to "a lack of ideas and moments of surprise", which make the compositions very predictable.

Extreme Aggression was generally well received by modern critics. AllMusic writer Jason Anderson wrote, "The results are fierce and noisy on this 1989 Epic release -- the first major-label effort for the band. Petrozza and Fioretti's guitar work is as punchy as ever, and Reil's massive drums are unrelenting and continually improving." Martin Popoff remarked the continuity of sound and purpose of the band through the 80s and reminded that the album contains some of his favourite Kreator songs. Blabbermouth.net reviewed the 2017 remastered edition of the Extreme Aggression and called it "a genre masterpiece", "superior in terms of songwriting and most certainly production" to its predecessors.

=== Commercial performance ===
At its initial release, the album sold more than 100,000 copies in Europe.

Coinciding with the 2017 remastered issue, Extreme Aggression charted for the first time 28 years after its release, and peaked at number 90 on the German charts. The remastered edition of the band's 1986 album Pleasure to Kill charted on the same day.

== Track listing ==
All lyrics are written by Mille Petrozza; all music is composed by Kreator.

No.	Title	Length
1.	"Extreme Aggressions"	4:44
2.	"No Reason to Exist"	4:37
3.	"Love Us or Hate Us"	3:42
4.	"Stream of Consciousness"	3:53
5.	"Some Pain Will Last"	5:39
6.	"Betrayer"	3:59
7.	"Don't Trust"	3:43
8.	"Bringer of Torture"	2:15
9.	"Fatal Energy"	4:57
Total length:		37:28

- 2017 CD remaster was released as a two-disc set, including the album itself remastered, as well as a second bonus CD featuring a live performance from East Berlin in 1990, aptly titled "Live in East Berlin 1990".

== Personnel ==
Kreator

- Mille Petrozza – guitars, lead vocals
- Jörg "Tritze" Trzebiatowski – guitars (credited but not played)
- Rob Fioretti – bass
- Ventor – drums

Additional musicians

- Dan Clements – background vocals
- Greg Saenz – background vocals

Production

- Randy Burns – production, engineering
- Martin Becker – photography
- Edwin Letcher – lyric adaptations
- Karl-Ulrich Walterbach – executive production

== Charts ==
Chart	Peak position
Dutch Albums (Album Top 100)	68
German Albums (Offizielle Top 100)	90
