= Phantom Antichrist =

2012 studio album by Kreator

- Cover art by Wes Benscoter

Studio album by Kreator
- Released: 1 June 2012
- Studio: Fascination Street Studios, Sweden
- Genre: Thrash metal, melodic death metal
- Length: 45:26
- Label: Nuclear Blast
- Producer: Jens Bogren

Kreator chronology
Hordes of Chaos (2009)	Phantom Antichrist (2012)	Dying Alive (2013)

Alternative cover
- Deluxe edition artwork

Singles from Phantom Antichrist
- 1. "Phantom Antichrist" Released: 3 May 2012; 2. "Civilization Collapse" Released: 9 November 2012

Phantom Antichrist is the 13th studio album by German thrash metal band Kreator, released through Nuclear Blast on 1 June 2012.

The album entered the US Billboard 200 at No. 130, selling 3,900 copies in the first week.

== Release and promotion ==
The album's title track was released as a limited edition 7" vinyl single, which sold out very quickly. It has since been released digitally. The B-side is a cover of "The Number of the Beast" by Iron Maiden.

Kreator released a music video for "Civilization Collapse" on 28 November 2012.

== Packaging ==
The digipak edition includes a bonus CD containing a documentary about the making of the album and a live set compiled from Kreator's performances at the Wacken Open Air festivals in 2008 and 2011.

A very limited edition version of the album is available through the Nuclear Blast online store, which comes in a metal box containing the CD+DVD version of the album, an exclusive live album called Harvesting the Grapes of Horror which contains the audio from the live portion of the DVD, a red T-shirt bearing the band's logo and the album title, a photocard signed by Mille Petrozza, an A1 poster of the album artwork, and a numbered certificate of authenticity.

== Critical reception ==
Professional ratings
Review scores
Source	Rating
About.com	4/5 stars
AllMusic	3.5/5 stars
Exclaim!	favorable
Metal Forces	9/10
Metal Storm	8.4/10

The album has a more progressive and melodic sound than previously explored by the band and was generally well received by critics. It won a 2012 Metal Storm Award for "Best Thrash Metal Album". According to Metal Injection, the sound on the album can be described as melodic death metal. "As is the case through most of Phantom AntiChrist, the title track feels like a shot of melodic death metal chased with a glass of dissonant thrash. Actually, through much of the album, it felt like Kreator decided to collaborate with Amon Amarth. This results in a heroic and catchy blend of sounds that I was not expecting, but was more than pleased to hear. From Flood to Fire is almost a perfect amalgamation, with a brilliantly constructed solo-bridge with a chugging rhythm section from hell. Civilization Collapse does one even better with a flurry of riffs and solos, ending with the sound of a mighty explosion." It won a 2012 Metal Storm Award for "Best Thrash Metal Album".

== Track listing ==
All tracks are written by Mille Petrozza.

No.	Title	Length
1.	"Mars Mantra" (Instrumental)	1:18
2.	"Phantom Antichrist"	4:31
3.	"Death to the World"	4:53
4.	"From Flood into Fire"	5:26
5.	"Civilization Collapse"	4:13
6.	"United in Hate"	4:31
7.	"The Few, the Proud, the Broken"	4:37
8.	"Your Heaven, My Hell"	5:53
9.	"Victory Will Come"	4:14
10.	"Until Our Paths Cross Again"	5:49
Total length:		45:26

Japanese edition hidden bonus track
No.	Title	Length
11.	"Iron Destiny"	4:31

Bonus DVD
No.	Title	Length
1.	"Conquerers of the Ice - The Making of Phantom Antichrist" (Directed by Matthias Kollek)	20:00
2.	"Harvesting the Grapes of Horror" (Live at Wacken Open Air 2008 / 2011)	55:00

Harvesting the Grapes of Horror - limited boxed set edition bonus CD
No.	Title	Length
1.	"Choir of the Damned" (Live at Wacken Open Air 2011)	0:40
2.	"Hordes of Chaos" (Live at Wacken Open Air 2011)	5:21
3.	"War Curse" (Live at Wacken Open Air 2011)	5:01
4.	"Coma of Souls / Endless Pain" (Live at Wacken Open Air 2011)	4:09
5.	"Pleasure to Kill" (Live at Wacken Open Air 2011)	3:15
6.	"Destroy What Destroys You" (Live at Wacken Open Air 2011)	3:26
7.	"The Patriarch" (Live at Wacken Open Air 2008)	0:52
8.	"Violent Revolution" (Live at Wacken Open Air 2008)	5:17
9.	"People of the Lie" (Live at Wacken Open Air 2008)	4:49
10.	"Europe After the Rain" (Live at Wacken Open Air 2008)	3:50
11.	"Phobia" (Live at Wacken Open Air 2011)	3:32
12.	"Terrible Certainty / Reconquering the Throne" (Live at Wacken Open Air 2011)	6:04
13.	"Flag of Hate / Tormentor" (Live at Wacken Open Air 2011)	7:35

== Personnel ==
Phantom Antichrist album personnel adapted from the CD liner notes.

Kreator

- Mille Petrozza – lead vocals, rhythm guitar
- Sami Yli-Sirniö – lead guitar, backing vocals, acoustic guitar on the intro of "United in Hate"
- Christian Giesler – bass
- Ventor – drums

Production

- Jens Bogren – mixing, recording, production at Fascination Street Studios, Sweden
- Ted Jensen – mastering at Sterling Sound, New York City
- Johan Örnborg – additional recording

Art

- Wes Benscoter – cover artwork
- Jan Meininghaus – additional cover artwork, booklet design
- Heile for Heilemania – band photos

== Chart performance ==
Chart	Peak position
Austrian Albums (Ö3 Austria)	31
Belgian Albums (Ultratop Flanders)	75
Belgian Albums (Ultratop Wallonia)	84
Dutch Albums (Album Top 100)	87
Finnish Albums (Suomen virallinen lista)	11
French Albums (SNEP)	87
German Albums (Offizielle Top 100)	5
Hungarian Albums (MAHASZ)	13
Japanese Albums (Oricon)	63
South Korean International Albums (Circle)	35
Norwegian Albums (VG-lista)	39
Spanish Albums (Promusicae)	89
Swedish Albums (Sverigetopplistan)	30
Swiss Albums (Schweizer Hitparade)	31
UK Independent Albums (Official Charts)	37
UK Rock & Metal Albums (Official Charts)	14
US Billboard 200	130
US Top Hard Rock Albums (Billboard)	8
US Heatseekers Albums (Billboard)	1
US Top Rock Albums (Billboard)	47
