= Endless Pain =

- Original album cover

Studio album by Kreator
- Released: October 1985
- Recorded: March 1985
- Studios: Caet Studio, Berlin
- Genres: Thrash metal; black metal; death metal
- Length: 38:40
- Label: Noise
- Producer: Horst Müller

Kreator chronology
Endless Pain (1985)	Pleasure to Kill (1986)

Professional ratings
Review scores
Source	Rating
AllMusic	2.5/5 stars
Collector's Guide to Heavy Metal	5/10
Rock Hard	7.5/10

Endless Pain is the debut studio album by German thrash metal band Kreator, released in October 1985 by Noise Records. In Germany, the album sold at least 12,000 copies.

== Music ==
The album combines elements of early black metal, death metal and thrash metal, ultimately creating a black metal-influenced thrash sound inspired by bands such as Venom, Mercyful Fate, and Bathory. On this album both Petrozza and Reil share vocal duties.

== Reception and legacy ==
Jason Anderson of AllMusic gave the album two and a half stars out of five. He wrote: "This release is hardly an embarrassment, and it should satisfy any fan of the group looking to complete his or her collection, but new listeners searching for Kreator's best '80s material are encouraged to check out the follow-up, Pleasure to Kill, or the exquisite Terrible Certainty before considering Endless Pain."

== Track listings ==
All tracks are written by Fioretti, Petrozza and Reil.

Side one
No.	Title	Vocals	Length
1.	"Endless Pain"	Reil	3:32
2.	"Total Death"	Petrozza	3:28
3.	"Storm of the Beast"	Reil	5:01
4.	"Tormentor"	Petrozza	2:56
5.	"Son of Evil"	Reil	4:16

Side two
No.	Title	Vocals	Length
1.	"Flag of Hate"	Petrozza	4:42
2.	"Cry War"	Reil	3:45
3.	"Bonebreaker"	Petrozza	2:58
4.	"Living in Fear"	Reil	3:12
5.	"Dying Victims"	Petrozza	4:51

1989 reissue edition
No.	Title	Length
1.	"Endless Pain"	3:32
2.	"Total Death"	3:28
3.	"Storm of the Beast"	5:01
4.	"Tormentor"	2:56
5.	"Son of Evil"	4:16
6.	"Take Their Lives" (bonus track; taken from Flag of Hate EP)	6:26
7.	"Flag of Hate" (re-recorded version; taken from Flag of Hate EP)	3:56
8.	"Cry War"	3:45
9.	"Bonebreaker"	2:58
10.	"Living in Fear"	3:12
11.	"Dying Victims"	4:51
12.	"Awakening of the Gods" (bonus track; taken from Flag of Hate EP)	7:33
Total length:		51:52

2017 remastered edition bonus tracks
No.	Title	Length
11.	"Satan's Day" (demo; taken from Tormentor's Blitzkrieg demo)	3:34
12.	"Messenger from Burning Hell" (demo; taken from Tormentor's Blitzkrieg demo)	4:14
13.	"Armies of Hell" (demo; taken from Tormentor's End of the World demo)	5:19
14.	"Tormentor" (demo; taken from Tormentor's End of the World demo)	2:55
15.	"Cry War" (demo; taken from Tormentor's End of the World demo)	4:21
16.	"Bonebreaker" (demo; taken from Tormentor's End of the World demo)	4:02
Total length:		24:25

== Personnel ==
Kreator

- Mille Petrozza – guitars, vocals (2, 4, 6, 8, 10)
- Rob Fioretti – bass
- Jürgen "Ventor" Reil – drums, vocals (1, 3, 5, 7, 9)

Production

- Horst Müller – production, engineering, mixing
- Mille Petrozza, Jürgen Crasser – mastering
- Phil Lawvere – artwork
- Karl-Ulrich Walterbach – executive production

2017 re-release

- Jan Meininghaus, Thomas Ewerhard – art, design
- Andy Pearce, Matt Wortham – mastering
- Malcolm Dome – sleeve notes
