= Coma of Souls =

Studio album by German band Kreator

Studio album by Kreator
- Released: 6 November 1990
- Studios: Eldorado Recording Studios and Image Studios, Hollywood, California
- Genre: Thrash metal
- Length: 44:45
- Labels: Noise (Germany); Epic (rest of the world)
- Producer: Randy Burns

Kreator chronology
Extreme Aggression (1989)	Coma of Souls (1990)	Renewal (1992)

Coma of Souls is the fifth studio album by German thrash metal band Kreator, released in 1990. It was reissued in 2002, with the lyrics for the last four songs missing from the booklet. Coma of Souls was Kreator's first release with lead guitarist Frank "Blackfire" Gosdzik (then-formerly of Sodom), and would be the last album before the band began experimenting with influences from other musical genres. It also would be the last record issued in the United States by Epic Records.

== Release ==
Coma of Souls was also released in the United States as a limited edition in purple vinyl. Although the album's lyrics contain no profanity, original copies of Coma of Souls had a Parental Advisory label on the cover. Subsequent pressings of the album do not carry the Parental Advisory label.

In March 2018, German record label Noise released a remastered edition of the album and made it available on CD and vinyl. The release contains a live performance of Kreator at Stadthalle Fürth, Germany on 6 December 1990, and liner notes.

== Critical reception ==
Professional ratings
Review scores
Source	Rating
AllMusic	4/5 stars
Rock Hard	9.0/10

Billboard in its favourable review compared the songwriting of Kreator with that of Metallica and Nuclear Assault and noted lyrical topics: "Songs targeting environmental crisis, war-mongering, and renascent Nazism in band's native land [...] Ecodisaster number 'When The Sun Burns Red' is excellent first course." Rock Hard reviewer considered Coma of Souls an improvement from its predecessor and wrote that "the new songs look mature, elaborately designed, without losing their aggressiveness." Eduardo Rivadavia of AllMusic praised the "overwhelmingly solid songwriting", but found that "Coma of Souls still sounded somewhat repetitive to all but the most unquestioning of fans" and was "guaranteed to thrill lovers of technically proficient thrash."

== Track listings ==
All lyrics are written by Mille Petrozza; all music is composed by Kreator.

No.	Title	Length
1.	"When the Sun Burns Red"	5:28
2.	"Coma of Souls"	4:18
3.	"People of the Lie"	3:15
4.	"World Beyond"	2:02
5.	"Terror Zone"	5:54
6.	"Agents of Brutality"	5:16
7.	"Material World Paranoia"	4:59
8.	"Twisted Urges"	2:46
9.	"Hidden Dictator"	4:47
10.	"Mental Slavery"	5:43
Total length:		44:45

2018 reissue bonus CD: Live at Stadthalle Fürth, Germany
No.	Title	Length
1.	"When the Sun Burns Red"	5:51
2.	"Betrayer"	4:37
3.	"Terrible Certainty"	5:58
4.	"Extreme Aggression"	5:50
5.	"Coma of Souls"	5:00
6.	"People of the Lie"	3:26
7.	"Choir of the Damned"	1:27
8.	"The Pestilence"	8:43
9.	"Toxic Trace"	4:14
10.	"Drum Solo"	2:54
11.	"Terror Zone"	6:03
12.	"Pleasure to Kill"	6:49
13.	"Flag of Hate"	2:58
14.	"Agents of Brutality"	5:18
15.	"Riot of Violence"	6:10
16.	"Tormentor"	3:30
Total length:		78:54

== Personnel ==
Kreator

- Mille Petrozza – vocals, rhythm guitar
- Frank "Blackfire" Gosdzik – lead guitar
- Rob Fioretti – bass
- Ventor – drums

Production

- Randy Burns – production, engineering, mixing at Music Grinder, Hollywood
- Steve Heinke – engineering, mixing
- Jason Roberts – engineering
- Andreas Marschall – artwork
- Martin Becker – photos
- Karl Ulrich Walterbach – executive production

2018 reissue technical personnel

- Steve Hammonds – compilation
- Andy Pearce, Matt Wortham – mastering
- Olman Viper – live mastering
- Thomas Ewerhard, Jan Meininghaus – art and design
- Holger Stratmann, Thomas Simon – additional photos
- Malcolm Dome – sleeve notes

== Charts ==
Chart (2018)	Peak position
German Albums (Offizielle Top 100)	83
