= Kreator =

German thrash metal band

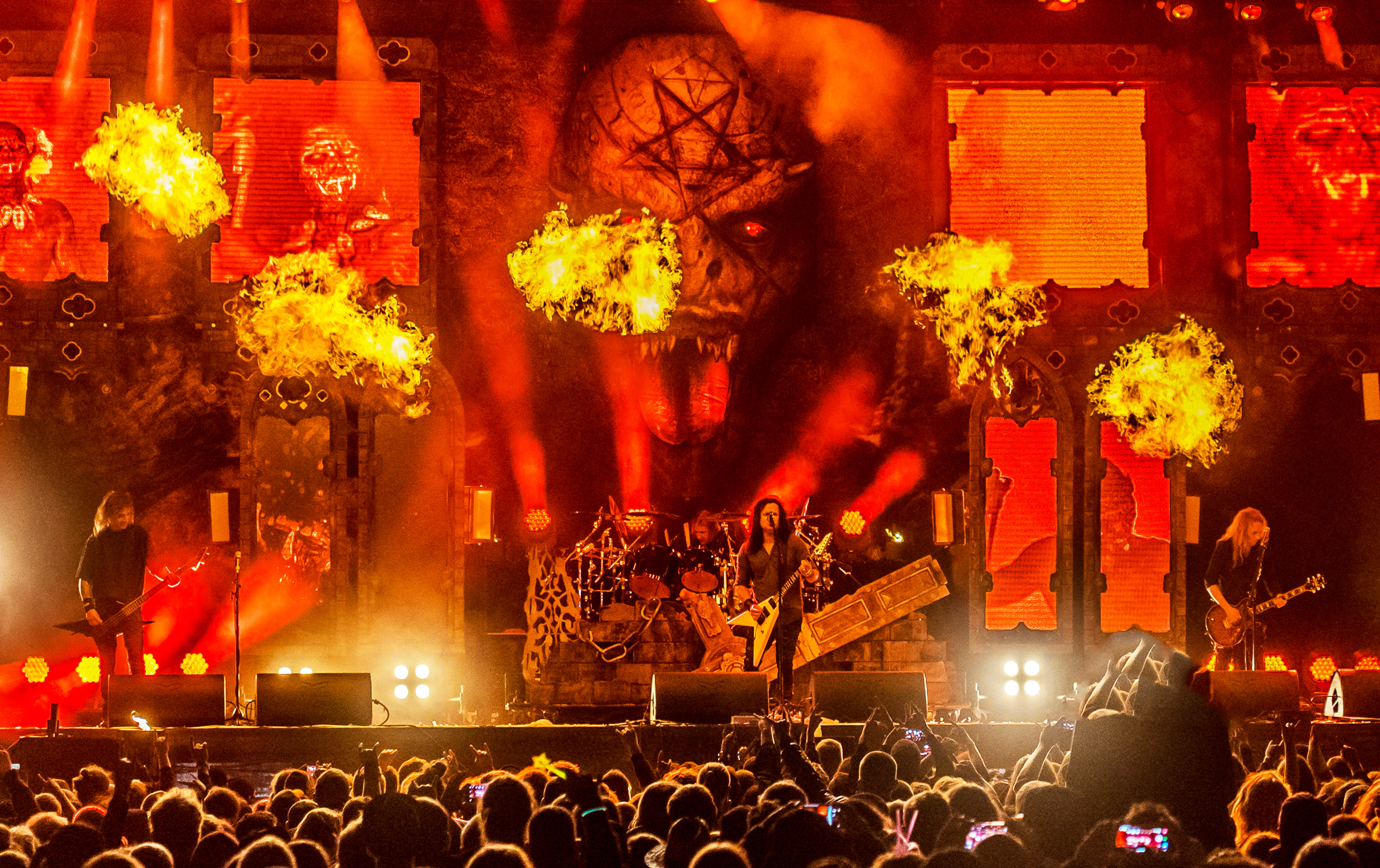
- Kreator performing at the Reload Festival in Germany, 2018

Background information
- Also known as: Metal Militia (1982); Tyrant (1982); Tormentor (1982–1984)
- Origin: Essen, North Rhine-Westphalia, Germany
- Genre: Thrash metal
- Works: Discography
- Years active: 1982–present
- Labels: Epic; Steamhammer; Drakkar; GUN; Noise; Combat; Nuclear Blast
- Members: Miland "Mille" Petrozza; Jürgen "Ventor" Reil; Sami Yli-Sirniö; Frédéric Leclercq
- Past members: Michael Wulf; Jörg "Tritze" Trzebiatowski; Frank "Blackfire" Gosdzik; Tommy Vetterli; Roberto "Rob" Fioretti; Andreas Herz; Joe Cangelosi; Christian "Speesy" Giesler
- Website: kreator-terrorzone.de

Kreator is a German thrash metal band from Essen, formed in 1982. Their current line-up consists of lead vocalist and rhythm guitarist Miland "Mille" Petrozza, drummer Jürgen "Ventor" Reil, lead guitarist Sami Yli-Sirniö, and bassist Frédéric Leclercq. The band's line-up has changed multiple times throughout its 44-year career, most noticeably their bassists and lead guitarists. Petrozza and Reil are the only two original members left in Kreator, although the latter left the band in 1994 but rejoined in 1996. Yli-Sirniö has been the lead guitarist of Kreator since 2001, while Leclercq joined in 2019 as the replacement of Christian "Speesy" Giesler, who had been in the band since 1994.

To date, Kreator has released sixteen studio albums, two EPs, two live albums and three compilation albums. They gained a large underground fanbase within the international thrash metal community, with their second studio album Pleasure to Kill (1986) regarded as an influential album of the genre. Many of their subsequent albums — including Terrible Certainty (1987), Extreme Aggression (1989), and Coma of Souls (1990) — were also highly acclaimed. Despite being an influential band, as well as one of the first European thrash metal bands to sign to a major label (signing to Epic Records in 1988), Kreator did not achieve mainstream popularity until later albums, including their thirteenth studio album Phantom Antichrist (2012) and its follow-up Gods of Violence (2017), both of which charted highly in many countries, with the latter reaching number one on the German charts. Their latest studio album, Krushers of the World, was released on 16 January 2026.

Kreator has achieved worldwide sales of over two million units for combined sales of all their albums, making them one of the best-selling German thrash metal bands of all time. Along with Destruction, Sodom and Tankard, they are credited as one of the "Big Four" of Teutonic thrash metal, responsible for developing and popularizing the German thrash metal scene, as well as pioneering the then-emerging death metal and black metal genres during the mid-1980s. The staff of Loudwire named them the 31st best metal band of all time in 2016. In 2025, Zahra Huselid of Screen Rant included the band in the site's list of "10 Best Thrash Metal Bands Who Weren't The Big Four".

== History ==
=== Formation and early releases (1982–1987) ===
The band was originally formed in 1982 as Metal Militia in Essen, Germany, and then became Tyrant. Later they used the name Tormentor until 1984, when they changed to its current name Kreator. The original line-up featured lead vocalist and guitarist Mille Petrozza, drummer Jürgen "Ventor" Reil, and bassist Rob Fioretti. Kreator recorded their debut album, Endless Pain (1985), in just ten days. The band hired future Sodom guitarist Michael Wulf for the album's tour to play lead, while Petrozza switched to rhythm guitar.

Wulf was only in the band for a few days but, contrary to the liner notes, he did not play on the band's second album Pleasure to Kill (1986), which is widely considered a thrash classic, and a big influence on the death metal genre. It would not be until 31 years after its release that Pleasure to Kill entered the German album charts. Produced by Harris Johns (who had also worked with Sodom, Helloween and Voivod), the album showed the band growing in talent and technical ability. The song "Flag of Hate" became a concert standard, and the band became one of the most promising up-and-coming European metal acts. The band started their first tour ever (prior to the release of Pleasure to Kill, they had only played five gigs total); they played their first shows outside of Germany during the fall of 1986, touring Europe with Destruction and Celtic Frost, and in the spring of 1987, they toured North America for the first time, supporting Voivod on their Killing Technology tour. Kreator's first EP, Flag of Hate, was also released in 1986. The band would become a quartet with the addition of guitarist Jörg "Tritze" Trzebiatowski.

=== Rising popularity (1987–1991) ===
In 1987, Kreator released its third studio album, Terrible Certainty, often considered a high-quality record as the arrangements were more complex and the tempos more varied. The album featured another hit, "Behind the Mirror". The band's popularity continued growing and a music video for "Toxic Trace" received airplay on MTV. They found enough time and money (coming from their concerts) to finance another EP, Out of the Dark... Into the Light (1988). By this point, Kreator was headlining their own tours and playing at theaters and arenas with bands such as Megadeth, Voivod, Overkill, D.R.I. and Holy Terror.

Berlin-based independent record label Noise Records licensed Kreator for the territories outside of Europe and Japan to major label Epic Records, with whom the band signed in 1988. Their fourth studio album and debut with Epic (for limited territories), Extreme Aggression, recorded in Los Angeles, became a metal hit in Europe upon its release in 1989. However, the album would not enter the German album charts until 28 years after its release. Continuing the Terrible Certainty formula while progressing musically with better production by the well-regarded Randy Burns (who had also worked with Megadeth, Possessed, Nuclear Assault, Death, Dark Angel, among others), the album featured the band's first major singles, the title track, "Betrayer" and the radio-only "Love Us or Hate Us", gaining support from the Southern California radio station KNAC, and the video for "Betrayer" receiving airplay on MTV's Headbangers Ball. This, as well as playing with bands like King Diamond, Raven, Coroner, Suicidal Tendencies, Death and Sadus, greatly expanded their popularity outside of Germany.

Also in 1989, German director Thomas Schadt made a documentary about Kreator (focusing on the social aspect of heavy metal in the Ruhr area) titled Thrash Altenessen (named after the band's hometown, a suburb of Essen). Tritze left Kreator after the release of Extreme Aggression. In 1990, with new guitarist Frank "Blackfire" Gosdzik (then-formerly of Sodom), the band released their fifth studio album, Coma of Souls, again produced by Burns. The album was not quite as praised as the band's previous few albums (many felt it was "rushed" and repetitive), but it still managed to sell and maintain popularity quite well, with the singles "When the Sun Burns Red" and "People of the Lie" becoming hits.

=== Experimentation (1992–2000) ===
The early 1990s brought a decline in the popularity of traditional thrash metal, which was replaced by grunge. By 1992, Kreator was released from their American contract with CBS/Sony Music, then-home of the likes of Alice in Chains and Pearl Jam. Their sixth studio album, Renewal, was released in the fall of that year, and featured heavy death metal and industrial influences. While reaching a newer audience, the band upset many longtime fans, accusing them of "selling out". Kreator experienced a decline in popularity as a result of the backlash against the album.

The line-up also underwent significant changes. Founding member Roberto Fioretti left after recording the album and was replaced by Andreas Herz. In 1994, Reil departed as well, leaving Petrozza the sole original band member. Reil was replaced by Joe Cangelosi while Herz left the same year and was replaced by Christian "Speesy" Giesler. During this time, Kreator had ended their tenure with Noise Records and signed with GUN Records. The new line-up released the album Cause for Conflict in 1995. The songs bore a heavy influence of such bands as Pantera and Machine Head, as well as a partial resemblance to Renewal.

Gosdzik and Cangelosi left in 1996 and were replaced by Tommy Vetterli (then-formerly of Coroner) and a returning Reil, respectively. The band performed at Wacken Open Air this year. Kreator continued to experiment, producing Outcast (1997) and Endorama (1999) with ambient and gothic influences and incorporating samples and loops. However, record sales went down, and by the end of the 1990s, the band had reached commercial and critical nadir. Despite that, Petrozza was quoted as stating: "For us, success doesn't define in record sales. So all our albums have been successful for us, because we've achieved what we were aiming for."

=== Return in style (2001–2009) ===
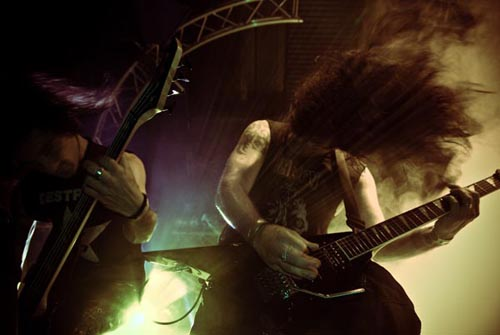
Kreator performing live at Hole in the Sky in 2007

In 2001, with Sami Yli-Sirniö replacing Tommy Vetterli on guitar, Kreator released their tenth studio album, Violent Revolution, which saw the band return to its classic thrash metal style. Despite containing a lot of melodic and so-called "Gothenburg metal" riffs, Violent Revolution was praised highly by fans and critics alike and benefited from the 2000s thrash metal revival movement, led by Overkill, Slayer, Megadeth, Exodus, and Testament. The tour was extremely successful and introduced Kreator to a younger generation of metal fans. Yli-Sirniö, who lived in Germany, was known to be a good guitar player, so the band recruited him. They played Wacken Open Air in 2002. A live album, Live Kreation, and a live DVD, Live Kreation: Revisioned Glory, were both released in 2003, and their eleventh studio album – emphasizing more on the Gothenburg influences – Enemy of God was released in 2005. A special edition was re-released in 2006, called Enemy of God: Revisited. In early 2006, Kreator toured North America with Napalm Death, A Perfect Murder, and The Undying. There was a joint headline European tour with Celtic Frost in 2007 with support from Watain. Kreator were slated to tour in 2008 with King Diamond, Leaves' Eyes, and Cellador, but this tour was canceled due to back issues with King Diamond.

In March 2008, the At the Pulse of Kapitulation DVD was released, featuring Live in East Berlin and Hallucinative Comas on one disc. Both had previously been available on VHS only and were long out of print. The band also began working on their twelfth full-length album in late 2007/early 2008, and began recording in July 2008. Recording for the album, titled Hordes of Chaos, wrapped up in late August, with the album released in January 2009. On 23 January 2009, the band began their "Chaos Over Europe" tour in Tilburg (the Netherlands) with Caliban, Eluveitie and Emergency Gate as other acts. In April 2009, the band embarked on a North American headlining tour, co-headlined by Exodus, and supported by Belphegor, Warbringer, and Epicurean. In late 2009, Reil was forced to sit out some tour dates due to personal issues, with Marco Minnemann temporarily taking his place.

=== Phantom Antichrist and Gods of Violence (2010–2017) ===
Kreator signed with Nuclear Blast in early 2010, before embarking on a North American tour in March to celebrate their 25th anniversary. A European tour with Exodus, Death Angel and Suicidal Angels, entitled Thrashfest, took place in late 2010. On 1 June 2012, they released their thirteenth studio album, Phantom Antichrist. Kreator co-headlined a 23-date North American tour that fall with Nuclear Blast labelmates Accept. Entitled the Teutonic Terror Attack 2012 tour, they were supported by Swallow the Sun. Kreator performed alongside Suidakra in Bangalore on 16 June 2012.

Kreator released a music video for "Civilization Collapse" on 28 November 2012.

In a November 2013 interview, Mille Petrozza stated that Kreator would begin working on their fourteenth studio album after the Phantom Antichrist tour for a 2016 release. However, Petrozza said that the album would not be released until 2017. On 30 August that year, they released a double live album called Dying Alive. It contained 24 tracks recorded at Turbinehalle in Oberhausen, Germany. On 14 October 2016, it was announced that Kreator's fourteenth studio album would be called Gods of Violence, and it was released on 27 January 2017. A music video for the album's title track was released on 18 November 2016. Gods of Violence received generally positive reviews, and was their first album to reach number one on the German charts. To promote the album, Kreator embarked on a headlining European tour in February and March 2017, with support from Sepultura, Soilwork and Aborted, and co-headlined the Decibel Magazine tour with Obituary in March and April. In late April, the band announced an Australian tour with Vader, which took place in September. They embarked on two tours in 2018: one in Europe with Decapitated and Dagoba in January, followed by a co-headlining North American tour with Sabaton in February and March.

=== Split with Christian Giesler, Hate Über Alles and Krushers of the World (2018–present) ===
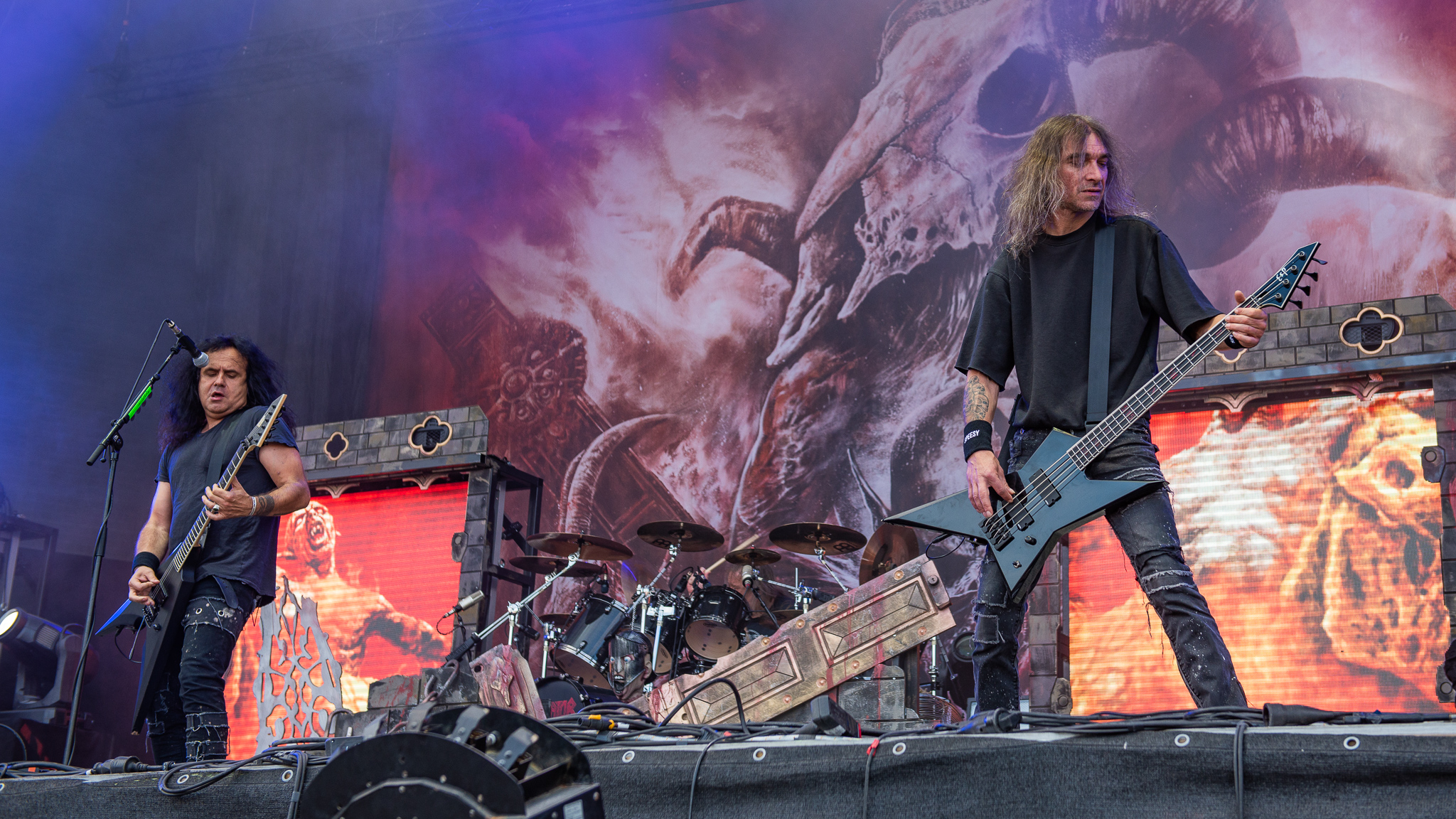
Kreator at Rock im Park, 2018

About three months after the release of Gods of Violence, Petrozza mentioned the possibility of a follow-up album, saying, "Maybe we should work with a different producer. Maybe we should go to a different country to record the album. Maybe we should write a more metal or more full-on thrash metal. Whatever we feel, first and foremost, that is the most important thing. Time will tell." In a September 2017 interview with Australia's Silver Tiger Media, Petrozza stated that Kreator could do another album after Gods of Violence but "not yet." When asked in February 2018 about the band's future, Petrozza said, "I think we're gonna take next year off and write a new record. That's the plan at least. We'll see what happens. I don't put myself under pressure. Let's see how I feel after this tour, and if I have ideas for new music, I will book a studio and start working on demos as soon as I have the time. And then I'll come up with some new stuff." He told Guitar Interactive magazine in July 2018 that Kreator would take 2019 off to focus on writing the new album, which was planned for release in the summer of 2020. Petrozza later stated their new album was not expected to be released until the summer of 2021.

In early December, Kreator embarked on the European Apocalypse tour with Dimmu Borgir, Hatebreed and Bloodbath. It was announced that the final concert of the European Apocalypse tour in London would be filmed and produced as a live DVD in 2019. Titled London Apocalypticon - Live at the Roundhouse, this DVD was released on 14 February 2020. Kreator supported Slayer on their final world tour, appearing at the Santiago Gets Louder festival in Chile on 6 October 2019, along with Anthrax and Pentagram Chile.

On 16 September 2019, it was announced that Christian "Speesy" Giesler had left Kreator after 25 years as their bassist, and was replaced by Frédéric Leclercq, who had recently left DragonForce.

On 26 March 2020, Kreator released a music video for "666 - World Divided", which marked their first song in three years and their first one since Leclercq joined the band.

On 20 July 2020, Petrozza posted a picture of himself in the studio on his Instagram page, indicating that Kreator was working on their next album. Petrozza confirmed two months later that Kreator had been writing new material "in the last couple of months", and that he was recording vocals for the album. In a March 2021 interview, Petrozza revealed that Kreator was supposed to start recording their new album in February, but this plan was interrupted by the COVID-19 pandemic. He went on to say that he wants "the album to come out and go on a world tour right afterwards", and revealed that Arthur Rizk would produce it. The band announced in September 2021 that they had begun recording the album at Hansa Tonstudio in Berlin, Germany with Rizk. In December 2021, Petrozza announced on his Instagram page that their new album would be released in the summer of 2022, preceded by a "new single SOON!". On 4 February 2022, the band released the title track from Hate Über Alles as the album's first single, and announced on the same day that the album would be released on 3 June. The release date was later pushed back to 10 June. A video for the second single from Hate Über Alles, "Strongest of the Strong", was released on 8 April 2022, followed less than a month later by its third single "Midnight Sun". A fourth music video was released for "Conquer and Destroy" on 22 May 2023, though unlike the previous three music videos, this song was not released as a single.

Kreator promoted Hate Über Alles with a world tour, including supporting Mercyful Fate on their first North American tour in over 20 years in late 2022, and touring Europe with Lamb of God and Municipal Waste during the winter of 2023. They also co-headlined the Klash of the Titans tour throughout the spring of 2023, first in Latin America with Testament, and then in North America with Sepultura, the latter supported by Death Angel and SpiritWorld. The band continued to tour in support of Hate Über Alles throughout 2024, including touring Japan in January–February with In Flames, co-headlining a North American tour with Testament in September–October (with Possessed as the opening act), and co-headlining a European trek in November–December with Anthrax and support from Testament. They also headlined the Klash of the Ruhrpott festival at Amphitheater Gelsenkirchen in Gelsenkirchen, Germany on 20 July 2024, which saw all of the "Big Teutonic Four" bands (Kreator, Sodom, Destruction and Tankard) on stage together for the first time. Touring for Hate Über Alles continued into 2025, with the band headlining the Demonic Summer tour with Rotting Christ and Warbringer.

By October 2023, Kreator had begun working on new material for their sixteenth studio album, which the band had planned to start recording in early 2025. However, Petrozza later stated that it would not be released until 2026. In a June 2025 interview with Loaded Radio, Leclercq confirmed that the band had been "putting the final touches to a new album that [would] be released sometime next year", and in the following month, guitarist Sami Yli-Sirniö announced they were "waiting for the final mixes". The resulting album, Krushers of the World, released on 16 January 2026.

Former Kreator bassist Andreas Herz died in December 2023. The news of his death was confirmed by Petrozza.

A documentary about the band, Kreator – Hate & Hope, premiered on 2 July 2025 at the 42nd Munich International Film Festival and received its worldwide release on 4 September.

Kreator toured in support of Krushers of the World during the winter and spring of 2026, first in Europe with Carcass, Exodus and Nails, while the North America leg included support from Carcass and Cold Steel. The latter tour included stops at Welcome to Rockville, Sonic Temple and Maryland Deathfest. The band will also headline a European tour in November 2026 with Overkill, and support Slayer on their first Latin American tour in years the following month.

== Musical style and influences ==
Kreator's musical style is similar to those of their compatriots Destruction, Sodom and Tankard, usually more complex and, since Violent Revolution (2001), more melodic. Along with those bands, Kreator has been referred to as one of the "Big Four" of Teutonic thrash metal, and they are often credited with helping pioneer death metal and black metal by containing several elements of what was to become those genres.

The band's style has changed several times over the years, from a Venom-inspired speed metal sound, later moving into thrash metal, and including a transitional period from thrash to industrial and gothic metal throughout the 1990s. Eduardo Rivadavia of AllMusic assessed the band's early material: "Like many of their European speed metal brethren, Kreator fused the Big Four's thrash innovations with Venom's proto-black metal imagery, sparked it with Motörhead's terminal velocity, and capped it off with the nihilistic outlook typical of heavy metal since the seminal days of Black Sabbath." Rivadavia assessed: "Kreator's career also mirrored speed metal's rising and waning fortunes: moving from strength to strength throughout the '80s. [...] As the new decade gave birth to grunge, Kreator felt it necessary to evolve, spending most of the rest of the decade taking their collective foot off the gas and exploring various combinations of industrial, goth[ic] rock, and alternative sounds resulting on 1999's post-metal Endorama." In the early 2000s, Kreator returned to its traditional thrash metal sound, albeit this time influenced by melodic death metal, a style which has continued to the present.

Kreator has been influenced by a variety of music, such as post-punk bands Siouxsie and the Banshees, hardcore punk bands Bad Religion, D.R.I., the Exploited, GBH and Raw Power, and 1970s and 1980s hard rock and heavy metal bands, including Accept, Bathory, Black Sabbath, Iron Maiden, Judas Priest, Kiss, Mercyful Fate, Metallica, Motörhead, Possessed, Raven, Rush, Slayer and Venom.

== Band members ==
Kreator, band members at Rockharz 2026

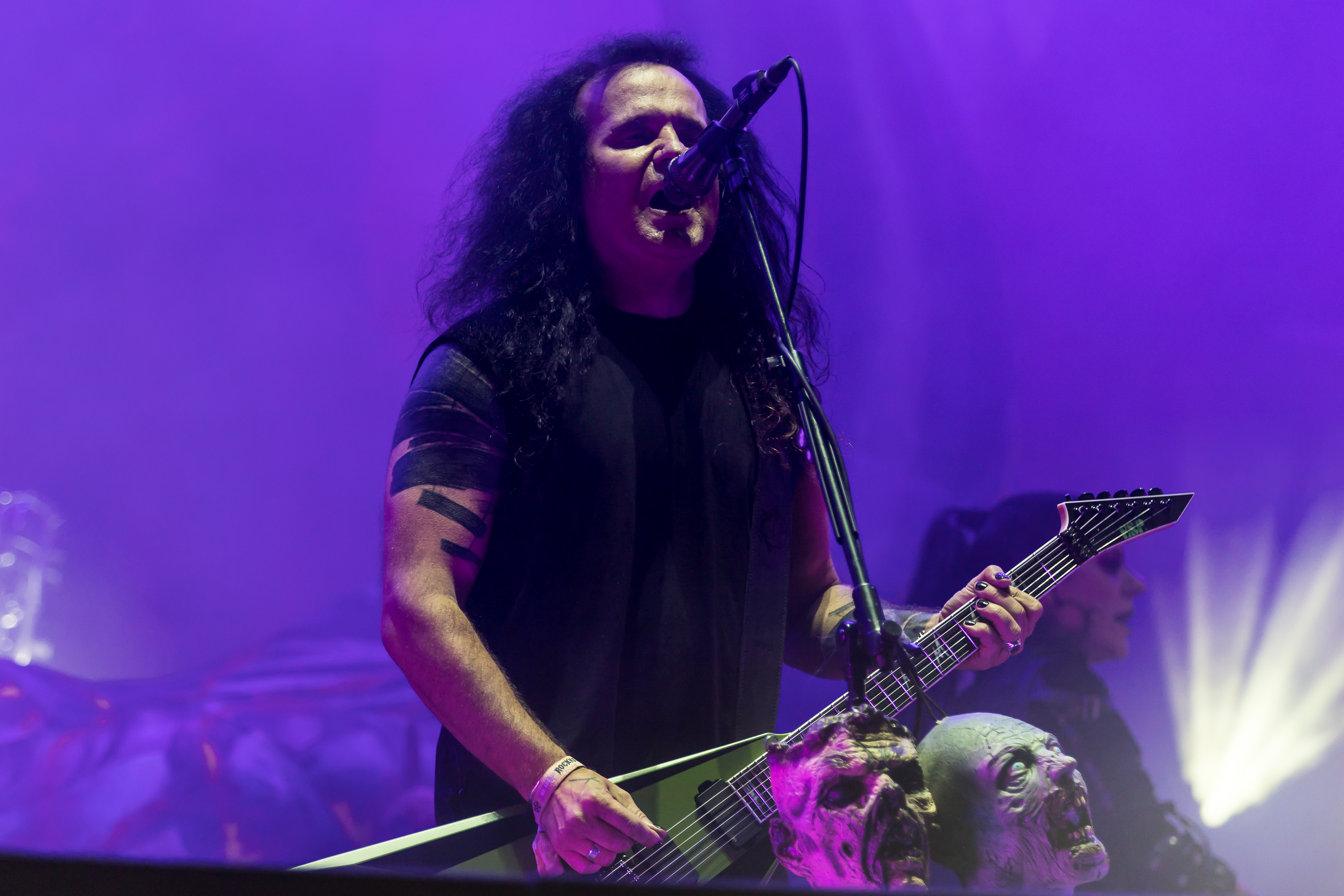
Mille Petrozza

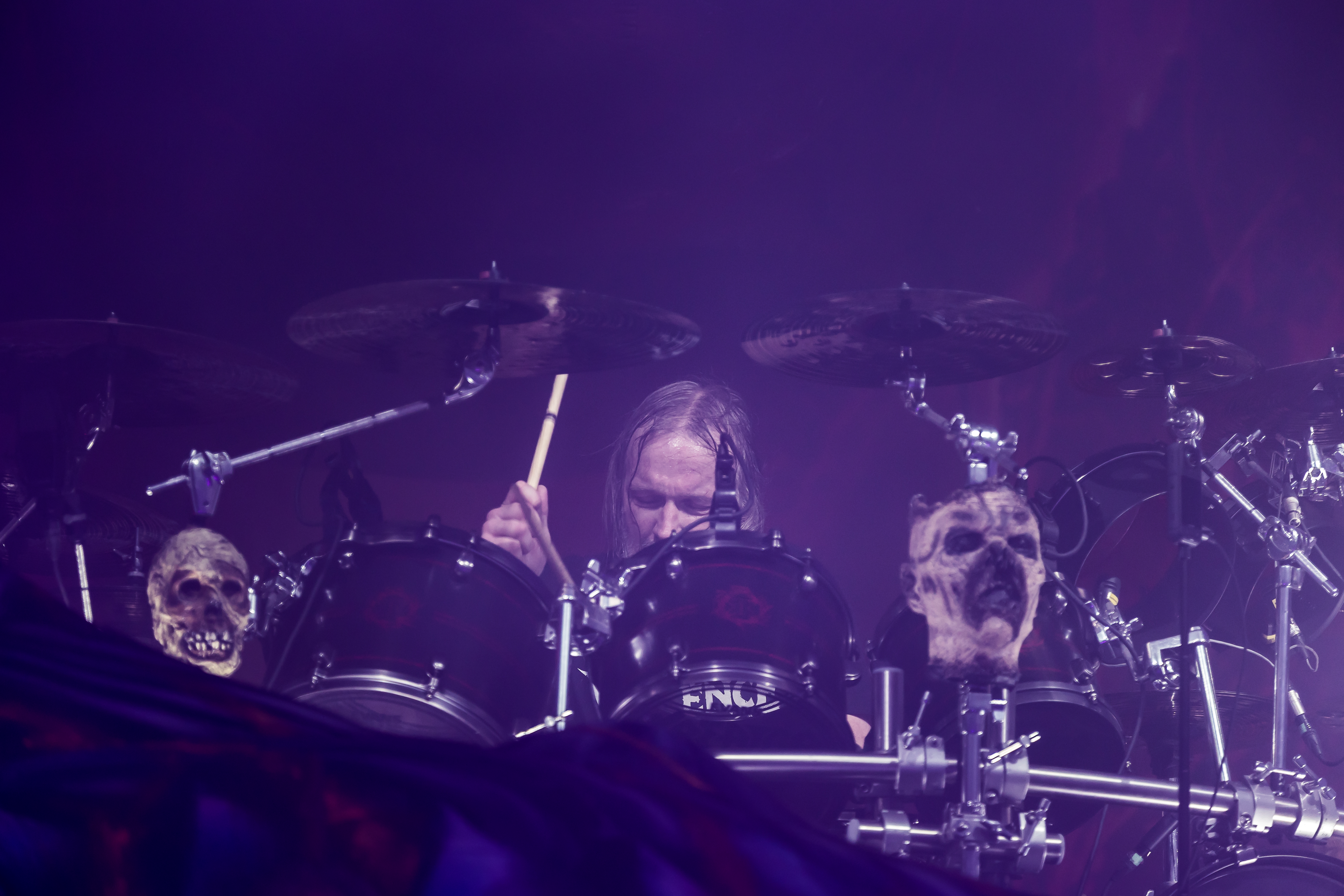
Ventor

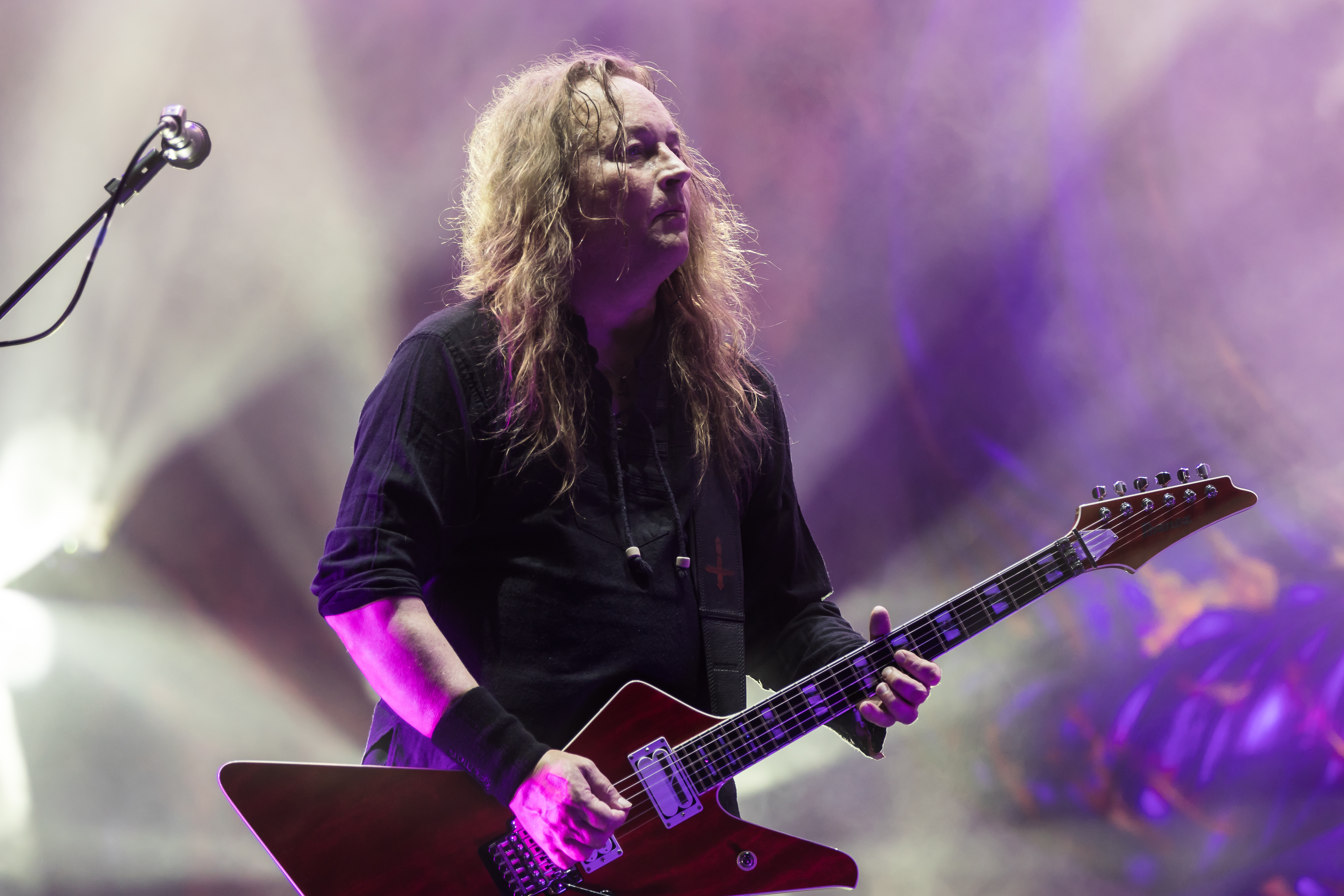
Sami Yli-Sirniö

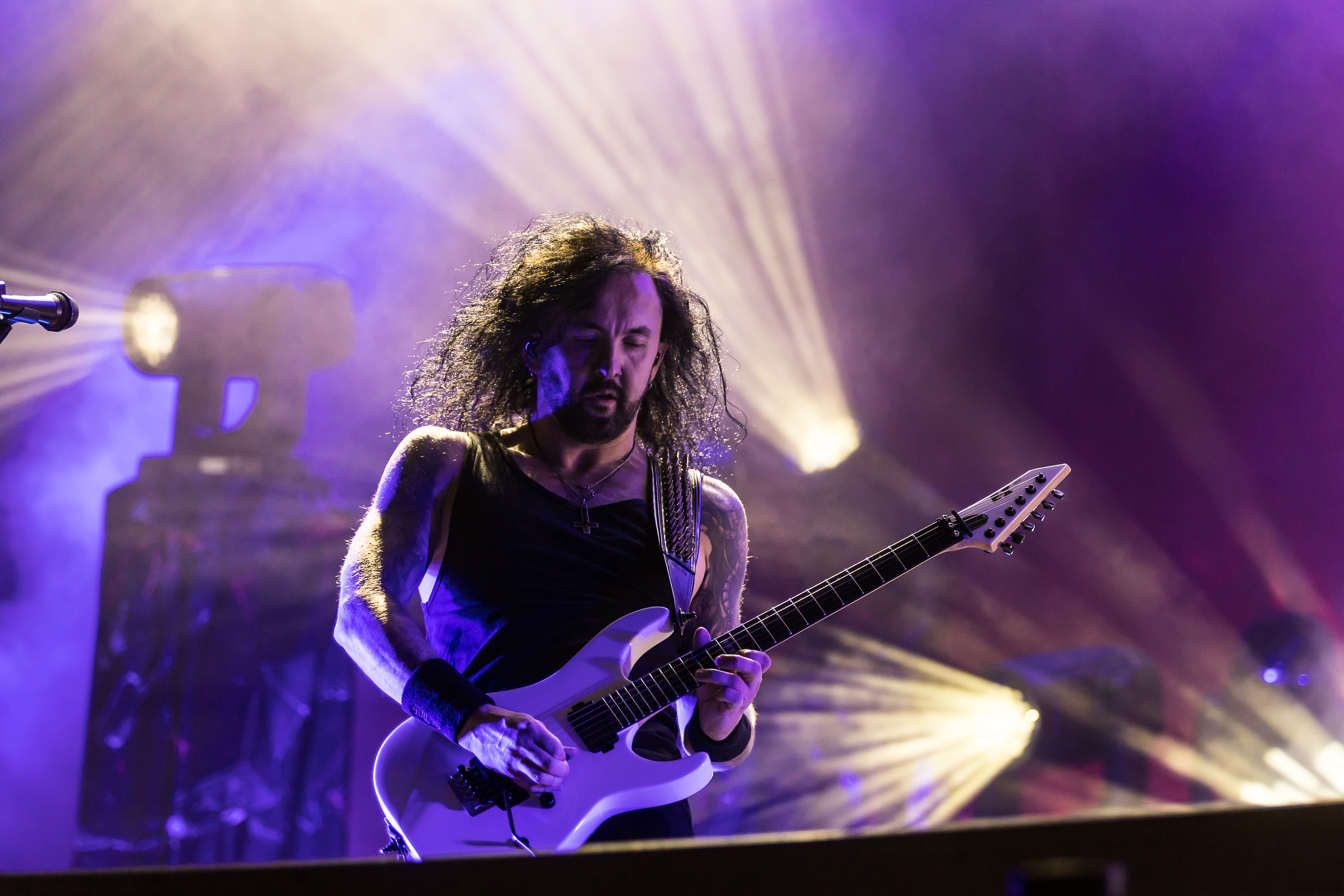
Frédéric Leclercq

Current

- Miland "Mille" Petrozza – lead vocals, rhythm guitar (1982–present), lead guitar (1982–1986, 1989) (Note: Jörg Trzebiatowski was credited as lead guitarist on the Extreme Aggression album; however, Mille Petrozza later revealed that he played all the guitar parts.)
- Jürgen "Ventor" Reil – drums (1982–1994, 1996–present), lead vocals (1982–1989)
- Sami Yli-Sirniö – lead guitar, backing vocals (2001–present)
- Frédéric Leclercq – bass, backing vocals (2019–present)

Former

- Roberto "Rob" Fioretti – bass (1982–1992)
- Jörg "Tritze" Trzebiatowski – lead guitar (1986–1989)
- Frank "Blackfire" Gosdzik – lead guitar (1989–1996)
- Andreas Herz – bass (1992–1994, died 2023)
- Christian "Speesy" Giesler – bass, backing vocals (1994–2019)
- Joe Cangelosi – drums (1994–1996)
- Tommy Vetterli – lead guitar (1996–2001)

Touring

- Michael Wulf – lead guitar (1986; died 1993)
- Bogusz Rutkiewicz – bass (1988)
- Markus "Makka" Freiwald – drums (2000)
- Marco Minnemann – drums (2009)

== Discography ==
- Endless Pain (1985)
- Pleasure to Kill (1986)
- Terrible Certainty (1987)
- Extreme Aggression (1989)
- Coma of Souls (1990)
- Renewal (1992)
- Cause for Conflict (1995)
- Outcast (1997)
- Endorama (1999)
- Violent Revolution (2001)
- Enemy of God (2005)
- Hordes of Chaos (2009)
- Phantom Antichrist (2012)
- Gods of Violence (2017)
- Hate Über Alles (2022)
- Krushers of the World (2026)
