= Pleasure to Kill =

Studio album by Kreator
- Released: November 1986
- Recorded: 1986
- Studio: Musiclab (Berlin)
- Genres: Thrash metal; death metal
- Length: 38:42
- Label: Noise
- Producers: Harris Johns, Ralf Hubert

Kreator chronology
Endless Pain (1985)	Pleasure to Kill (1986)	Flag of Hate (1986)

Pleasure to Kill is the second studio album by German thrash metal band Kreator, released in November 1986 by Noise Records.

It is considered an essential release in the thrash metal genre. The album remains popular among collectors of physical media.

== Background and recording ==
Pleasure to Kill was produced by Harris Johns, who had previously worked with bands such as Helloween. Vocalist-guitarist Mille Petrozza said: "The situation was better than on the first album. The producer for that one, Horst Müller, wasn't interested in us. Even when we fucked up, he said, 'Yeah, it's fine!' [...] Basically, [Johns] made a good recording and he made us perform the songs in multiple takes. We had two weeks to do it, with three or four days for the drums and overdubs. It was really professional."

== Music and lyrics ==
Musical influences on Pleasure to Kill include Hirax, Sepultura, Possessed, and Death. Vocalist-guitarist Mille Petrozza recalled the creative process: "We were young kids full of enthusiasm. Kids who wanted to sound like the bands they listened to. We were tape traders: we'd listen to all kinds of stuff from the metal underground – We just wanted to be part of that scene, and when I listen to Pleasure To Kill now, that’s what I hear."

The lyrical themes follow those found on their first album Endless Pain, containing descriptions of macabre scenes of death and horror. Just like that album, Kreator were a three-piece band during the recording of Pleasure to Kill; on some early pressings, guitarist Michael Wulf, who was briefly a member of Kreator, was erroneously credited as a band member in the liner notes.

== Reception and legacy ==
Professional ratings
Review scores
Source	Rating
AllMusic	4/5 stars
Collector's Guide to Heavy Metal	6/10
Metal Hammer (GER)	5/7
Rock Hard	8.0/10

Pleasure to Kill is widely considered a landmark thrash metal classic, along with Master of Puppets by Metallica, Peace Sells... but Who's Buying? by Megadeth, Reign in Blood by Slayer, Eternal Devastation by Destruction and Darkness Descends by Dark Angel, all released in 1986. The album played a considerable role in the development of many extreme metal subgenres, and death metal bands such as Cannibal Corpse cite the album as an influence. Mille Petrozza said: "Those kids are influenced by what we've done in the past, but it's all great! If they're discovering what we did 20 years ago, it's like a manifesto for what this whole scene is about. Metal should be about saying, 'Fuck you and everybody else – I'm going to do my thing!'"

In a contemporary review, Oliver Klemm of the German Metal Hammer called Kreator "the best death metal band in Europe after Celtic Frost" and described the album as obviously inspired by Possessed's Seven Churches, but "even louder, even faster, even more brutal". Rock Hard reviewer found the album very similar to Endless Pain and, despite the opaque drum sound, quite good by hardcore standards. In a modern review, AllMusic writer Jason Anderson wrote that "many in the underground metal scene were already paying special attention to the German outfit's proto-death sound, but the cult status was shed after this critically and commercially successful second effort hit record-store shelves. As fierce and unyielding as the group's debut, Endless Pain, was, Pleasure to Kill provides double the sonic carnage and superior material." Canadian journalist Martin Popoff acknowledged the importance of the album in "propelling the band into the trinity of the genre next to Destruction and Sodom", but was not very pleased by the "tech-thrash ugliness" of the music.

Pleasure to Kill had impact on the extreme metal scenes to follow. Petrozza told author Jon Wiederhorn in 2010, “And yeah, it probably is one of the essential records for the death metal movement. A lot of black metal bands even say that Pleasure to Kill is one of their main influences.” In the German Netflix series Dark, character Ulrich Nielsen is a fan of Kreator as a teenager, the lyric 'My only aim is to take many lives / The more, the better I feel' from the title track "Pleasure to Kill" leading police officer Egon Tiedemann to suspect Ulrich may be a Satanist.

In 2025, Joel McIver of Metal Hammer said the album "proved that America didn't have the monopoly on thrash."

== Commercial performance ==
Coinciding with the 2017 remastered issue, Pleasure to Kill charted for the first time 31 years after its release, and peaked at number 99 on the German album charts. The remastered edition of the band's 1989 album Extreme Aggression charted on the same day.

=== Accolades ===
Pleasure to Kill was ranked at number four on Loudwire's top ten list of "Thrash Albums NOT Released by the Big 4".

== In popular culture ==
The song "Awakening of the Gods" appeared in the video game Grand Theft Auto IV: The Lost and Damned in the radio station Liberty City Hardcore. The album's material has also made appearances in the Netflix series Dark.

== Track listings ==
All tracks are written by Mille Petrozza, except where noted.

Side one
No.	Title	Writer(s)	Vocals	Length
1.	"Choir of the Damned" (instrumental)			1:39
2.	"Ripping Corpse"		Petrozza	3:36
3.	"Death Is Your Saviour"	Jürgen Reil, Petrozza, Roberto Fioretti	Reil	3:58
4.	"Pleasure to Kill"		Petrozza	4:11
5.	"Riot of Violence"	Reil, Petrozza	Reil	4:56

Side two
No.	Title	Writer(s)	Vocals	Length
6.	"The Pestilence"		Petrozza	6:58
7.	"Carrion"	Reil, Petrozza, Fioretti	Petrozza	4:48
8.	"Command of the Blade"	Reil, Petrozza	Reil	3:57
9.	"Under the Guillotine"		Petrozza	4:38
Total length:				38:42

2017 re-release: Flag of Hate EP bonus tracks
No.	Title	Writer(s)	Length
10.	"Flag of Hate"	Reil, Petrozza, Fioretti	3:56
11.	"Take Their Lives"		6:26
12.	"Awakening of the Gods"		7:32

After the Attack – 1987 vinyl limited edition
No.	Title	Length
1.	"Choir of the Damned"	1:39
2.	"Ripping Corpse"	3:36
3.	"Death is Your Saviour"	3:58
4.	"Pleasure to Kill"	4:11
5.	"Riot of Violence"	4:56
6.	"After the Attack" (bonus track)	3:43
7.	"The Pestilence"	6:58
8.	"Carrion"	4:48
9.	"Command of the Blade"	3:57
10.	"Under the Guillotine"	4:38
Total length:		42:24

1991 Japanese reissue bonus tracks
No.	Title	Length
11.	"Flag of Hate" (taken from Flag of Hate EP)	3:55
12.	"Take Their Lives" (taken from Flag of Hate EP)	6:27
13.	"Awakening of the Gods" (taken from Flag of Hate EP)	7:30
14.	"Endless Pain" (taken from Endless Pain)	3:22
15.	"Tormentor" (taken from Endless Pain)	2:52
16.	"Total Death" (taken from Endless Pain)	3:26
Total length:		66:13

== Personnel ==
Kreator

- Mille Petrozza – guitars, vocals (2, 4, 6, 7, 9)
- Rob Fioretti – bass
- Ventor – drums, vocals (3, 5, 8)

Additional musicians

- Michael Wulf – lead guitar (credited but not played)

Production

- Harris Johns – production, engineering
- Ralf Hubert – production
- Maren Layout – design
- Fred Baumgart, Kreator – photography
- Phil Lawvere – cover artwork
- Mille Petrozza – remastering
- Karl-Ulrich Walterbach – executive production

2017 re-release

- Andy Pearce, Matt Wortham – mastering
- Thomas Ewerhard, Jan Meininghaus – art, design
- Malcolm Dome – sleeve notes

== Charts ==
Chart (2017)	Peak position
German Albums (Offizielle Top 100)	99
