= Terrible Certainty =

Studio album by Kreator
- Released: 22 September 1987
- Recorded: 1987
- Studios: Horus Studio (Hanover, Germany)
- Genre: Thrash metal
- Length: 35:39
- Label: Noise
- Producer: Roy Rowland

Kreator chronology
Flag of Hate (1986)	Terrible Certainty (1987)	Out of the Dark... Into the Light (1988)

Professional ratings
Review scores
Source	Rating
Aaaarrghh!	Favorable
AllMusic	4.5/5 stars
Collector's Guide to Heavy Metal	6/10
Rock Hard	9.0/10

Terrible Certainty is the third studio album by German thrash metal band Kreator, released in 1987 through Noise Records. It is the band's first album recorded as a four piece. It was released on CD, cassette, black vinyl, and as a limited edition red vinyl. The remastered version of 2000 contains the tracks of the 1988 Out of the Dark... Into the Light EP as bonus tracks. Another remastered version in 2 CDs was released on 9 June 2017, and included all the live tracks from the EP. The album has sold more than 100,000 copies.

== Track listing ==
All lyrics are written by Mille Petrozza; all music is composed by Kreator.

Side one
No.	Title	Length
1.	"Blind Faith"	4:07
2.	"Storming with Menace"	4:26
3.	"Terrible Certainty"	4:29
4.	"As the World Burns"	3:50

Side two
No.	Title	Length
5.	"Toxic Trace"	5:33
6.	"No Escape"	5:01
7.	"One of Us"	4:00
8.	"Behind the Mirror"	4:34

== Personnel ==
Kreator

- Mille Petrozza – lead vocals, rhythm guitar
- Jörg "Tritze" Trzebiatowski – lead guitar
- Rob Fioretti – bass
- Ventor – drums, co-lead vocals on "As the World Burns"

Production

- Roy Rowland – production
- Phil Lawvere – cover artwork
