= Renewal (Kreator album) =

Studio album by Kreator
- Released: 26 October 1992
- Recorded: August and September 1992
- Studio: Morrisound Studios (Tampa, Florida)
- Genres: Thrash metal; industrial metal
- Length: 38:53
- Label: Noise
- Producers: Tom Morris, Kreator

Kreator chronology
Coma of Souls (1990)	Renewal (1992)	Cause for Conflict (1995)

Professional ratings
Review scores
Source	Rating
AllMusic	2.5/5 stars
Collector's Guide to Heavy Metal	8/10
Rock Hard	9.5/10
Under the Volcano	Favourable

Renewal is the sixth album by German thrash metal band Kreator, released in 1992. It's their first "experimental" album, as in this release Kreator incorporated industrial music influences in their songwriting. It is also the last album to feature original bassist Rob Fioretti. The song "Karmic Wheel" contains audio samples from the suicide of R. Budd Dwyer.

A music video was made for the title track.

== Release ==
In March 2018, German record label Noise released a remastered edition of the album and made it available on CD and vinyl and as digital download. The release contains three bonus tracks and liner notes.

== Track listing ==
All lyrics are written by Mille Petrozza; all music is composed by Kreator.

No.	Title	Length
1.	"Winter Martyrium"	5:43
2.	"Renewal"	4:36
3.	"Reflection"	6:15
4.	"Brainseed"	3:17
5.	"Karmic Wheel"	6:06
6.	"Realitätskontrolle"	1:22
7.	"Zero to None"	3:12
8.	"Europe After the Rain"	3:19
9.	"Depression Unrest"	5:05
Total length:		38:53

2018 reissue bonus tracks
No.	Title	Length
10.	"Winter Martyrium (Rare version)"	6:13
11.	"Trauma"	5:12
12.	"Europe After the Rain (Remix)"	3:14
Total length:		53:37

== Personnel ==
Kreator

- Mille Petrozza – vocals, rhythm guitar
- Frank Gosdzik – lead guitar
- Rob Fioretti – bass
- Ventor – drums, programming

Production

- Kreator – production
- Tom Morris – production, engineering, mixing
- Mark Prator, Brian Bonscoter – engineering
- Karl Ulrich Walterbach – executive production

2018 reissue production

- Steve Hammond – compilation
- Andy Pearce, Matt Worthams – mastering
- Thomas Ewerhard, Jan Meininghaus – art and design
- Holger Stratmann, Markus Müller – additional photos
- Malcolm Dome – sleeve notes
