= Mille Petrozza =

German guitarist and singer (born 1967)

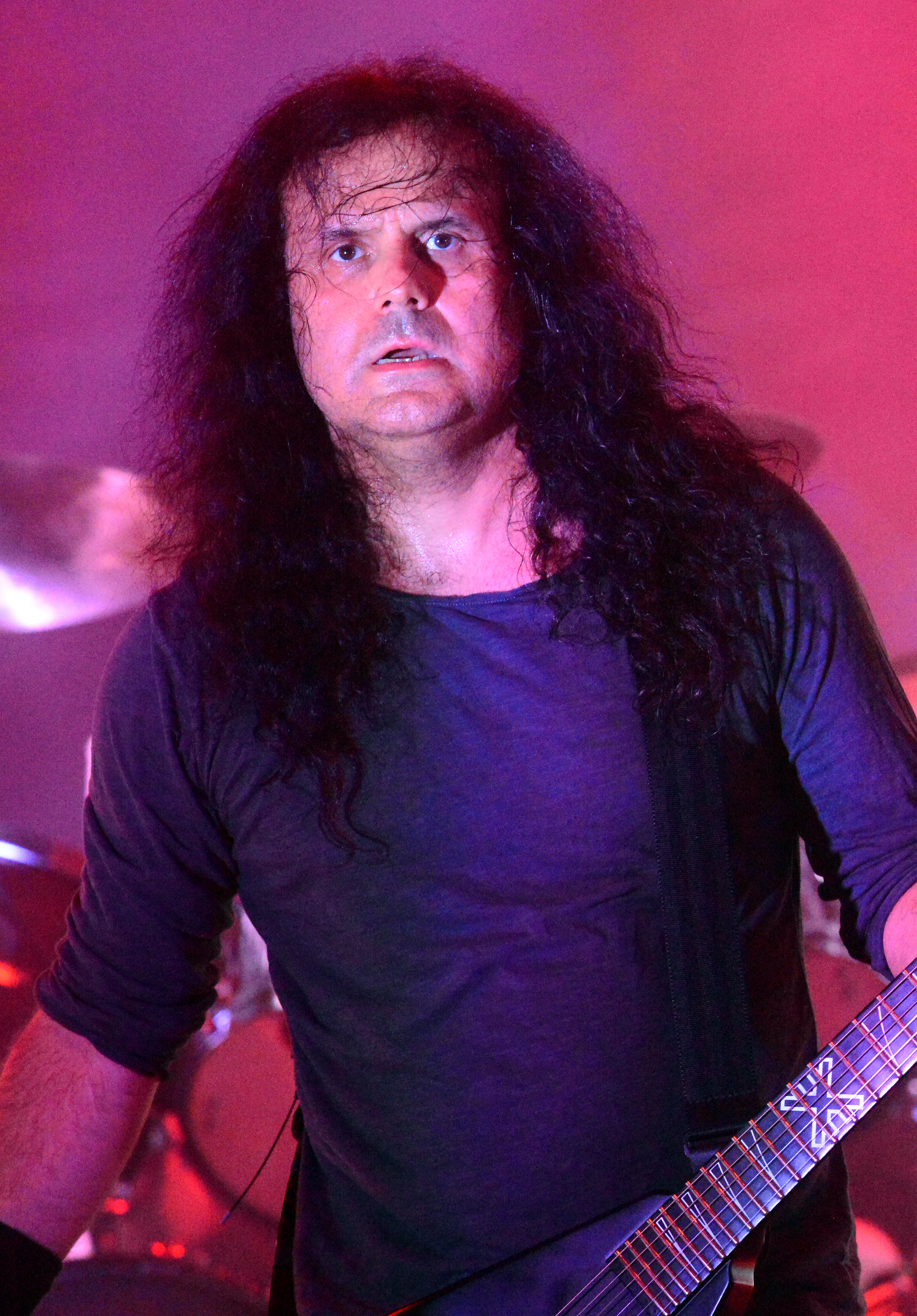
- Petrozza performing with Kreator in 2015

Background information
- Born: Miland Petrozza; 18 December 1967 (age 58); Essen, West Germany
- Genres: Thrash metal
- Occupations: Singer, musician, songwriter
- Instruments: Vocals, guitar
- Years active: 1982–present
- Member of: Kreator
- Formerly of: Voodoocult, Tormentor

Miland "Mille" Petrozza (born 18 December 1967) is a German musician. He is the lead vocalist and rhythm guitarist of thrash metal band Kreator, which he started playing in as Tyrant in 1982 and renamed into Tormentor in 1984. He is also the principal songwriter of the band and the only member to appear on every Kreator album.

In 1994, Petrozza played guitar in the metal all-star band Voodoocult, amongst such artists as Dave Lombardo of Slayer and Chuck Schuldiner of Death. He also shared lead vocals in union with Tomas Lindberg for the track "Dirty Coloured Knife" on the self-titled 2002 album from Israeli metal act Nail Within. He appeared on Edguy's 2004 album, Hellfire Club, providing lead vocals on an alternate version of the album's opening song, "Mysteria", featured as a bonus track to the album. He also appeared on Caliban's 2006 album, The Undying Darkness, on "Moment of Clarity". He also appeared on the 2010 Volbeat album Beyond Hell/Above Heaven on the track titled "7 Shots". Petrozza and drummer Stefan Schwarzmann played for the recording of the 2012 album Revolution by Lacrimosa.

== Personal life ==
Petrozza is vegan. He and his wife regularly contributed to the vegan magazine Kochen ohne Knochen, run by Joachim Hiller. Petrozza has also collaborated with Peta2, but he believes his lifestyle is a personal choice, "I do not want to preach my lifestyle on others".

== Discography ==
Kreator

- Endless Pain (1985)
- Pleasure to Kill (1986)
- Terrible Certainty (1987)
- Extreme Aggression (1989)
- Coma of Souls (1990)
- Renewal (1992)
- Cause for Conflict (1995)
- Outcast (1997)
- Endorama (1999)
- Violent Revolution (2001)
- Enemy of God (2005)
- Hordes of Chaos (2009)
- Phantom Antichrist (2012)
- Gods of Violence (2017)
- Hate Über Alles (2022)
- Krushers of the World (2026)

Voodoocult

- Jesus Killing Machine (1994)

Edguy

- Hellfire Club (2004)

Lacrimosa

- Revolution (2012)

Avantasia

- Moonglow (2019)
