= Jürgen Reil =

German drummer

Jürgen "Ventor" Reil
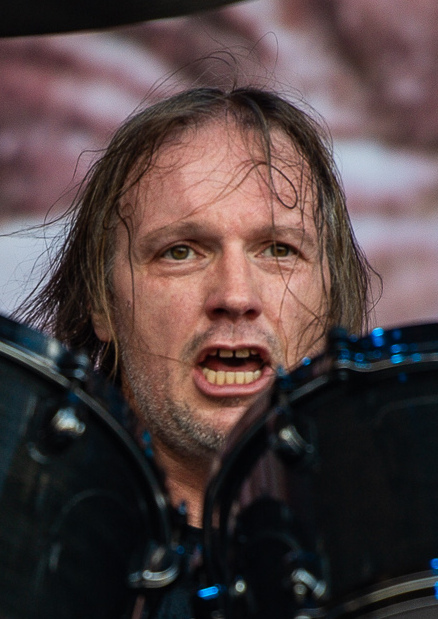
- Ventor performing with Kreator in 2018

Background information
- Born: 29 June 1966 (age 59)
- Genres: Thrash metal
- Occupation: Drummer
- Years active: 1982–present
- Member of: Kreator

Jürgen "Ventor" Reil (born 29 June 1966) is a German musician, best known as the drummer for the thrash metal band Kreator. He is one of the only two original members left in the band, although he has left "at least twice" due to personal differences.

Reil plays the double bass drum style prevalent in thrash and death metal. He also sang lead vocals on a few songs on the band's earlier albums, and still does occasionally live (notably "Riot of Violence").

He is a big fan of tattoo art and he owns his own tattoo studio in Essen-Karnap (Kreativ-Tattoo), in which he actively works as a tattooer.

== Discography ==
- Endless Pain (1985)
- Pleasure to Kill (1986)
- Terrible Certainty (1987)
- Extreme Aggression (1989)
- Coma of Souls (1990)
- Renewal (1992)
- Outcast (1997)
- Endorama (1999)
- Violent Revolution (2001)
- Enemy of God (2005)
- Hordes of Chaos (2009)
- Phantom Antichrist (2012)
- Gods of Violence (2017)
- Hate Über Alles (2022)
- Krushers of the World (2026)
