= Brasil (Ratos de Porão album) =

Studio album by Ratos de Porão
- Released: 1989
- Genre: Crossover thrash
- Length: 28:53
- Label: Roadrunner
- Producer: Harris Johns

Ratos de Porão chronology
Cada dia mais sujo e agressivo (1987)	Brasil (1989)	Anarkophobia (1991)

Professional ratings
Review scores
Source	Rating
Allmusic	4/5 stars

Brasil is the fourth album by Brazilian crossover thrash band Ratos de Porão, which was released in 1989 through Roadrunner Records. Considered by many fans the masterpiece of Ratos' discography, this record was the passport to the world scene. It was recorded in Berlin, and produced by Harris Johns, who produced bands such Tankard and Exumer. This can be considered as a true crossover album, mixing hardcore and metal. Available in Portuguese and English versions.

== Track listing ==
All tracks are written by Ratos de Porão.

No.	Title	Length
1.	"Amazônia Nunca Mais" (Amazonia Never More)	1:56
2.	"Retrocesso" (Backwards)	1:35
3.	"AIDS, Pop, Repressão" (AIDS, Pop, Repression)	1:17
4.	"Lei do Silêncio" (Law of Silence)	2:17
5.	"S.O.S. País Falido" (S.O.S. Broken Country)	1:27
6.	"Gil Goma" (Gil Coma)	0:43
7.	"Beber Até Morrer" (Drink 'til You Die)	2:20
8.	"Plano Furado II" (Fucked Plan II [Only included on Brazilian releases])	2:15
9.	"Heroína Suicida" (Suicidal Heroin)	1:41
10.	"Crianças Sem Futuro" (Children Without Future)	2:30
11.	"Farsa Nacionalista" (Nationalist Farce)	0:51
12.	"Traidor" (Traitor)	1:51
13.	"Porcos Sanguinários" (Bloody Pigs)	1:28
14.	"Vida Animal" (Animal Life)	0:59
15.	"O Fim" (The End)	1:57
16.	"Máquina Militar" (Military Machine)	2:16
17.	"Terra do Carnaval" (Land of Carnival)	1:53
18.	"Herança" (Will I Receive My Heritage?)	1:23
Total length:		28:53

== Personnel ==
- Vocals - João Gordo
- Guitars - Jão
- Bass - Jabá
- Drums - Spaghetti
- Backing vocals - David Pollack, Archi (Happy Hour) and Frank Preece (Exumer)
