= Zombie Attack =

Studio album by Tankard
- Released: July 1986
- Recorded: June 1986
- Studios: Musiclab Studio, Berlin, Germany
- Genre: Thrash metal
- Length: 36:51
- Label: Noise
- Producer: Harris Johns

Tankard chronology
Zombie Attack (1986)	Chemical Invasion (1987)

Professional ratings
Review scores
Source	Rating
AllMusic	3.0/5 stars
Metal Forces	(7/10)
Metal.de	(favourable)

Zombie Attack is the debut album by German thrash metal band Tankard. The album was re-released in a set with another Tankard album, Chemical Invasion, in 2005.

== Track listing ==
- All songs written by Andreas Geremia and Axel Katzmann, except where noted.
1. "Zombie Attack" (Geremia, Frank Thorwarth) 3:49
2. "Acid Death" 4:45
3. "Mercenary" 3:24
4. "Maniac Forces" 5:05
5. "Alcohol" 2:06
6. "(Empty) Tankard" 4:43
7. "Thrash 'til Death" 2:31
8. "Chains" 3:36
9. "Poison" 3:56
10. "Screamin' Victims" (Geremia, Thorwarth) 3:01

== Personnel ==
=== Tankard ===
- Andreas "Gerre" Geremia – vocals
- Axel Katzmann – guitar
- Andy Bulgaropulos – guitar
- Frank Thorwarth – bass
- Oliver "O.W." Werner – drums
