= Disco Destroyer =

Studio album by Tankard
- Released: 12 March 1998
- Recorded: December 1997 – January 1998
- Genre: Thrash metal
- Length: 45:53
- Label: Century Media
- Producer: Harris Johns

Tankard chronology
The Tankard (1995)	Disco Destroyer (1998)	Kings of Beer (2000)

Professional ratings
Review scores
Source	Rating
Chronicles of Chaos	3/10 stars
Rock Hard	8.5/10 stars

Disco Destroyer is the eighth studio album by German thrash metal band Tankard. This is their first album released by Century Media. The album was re-released by AFM Records in 2002 with a cover version of Manowar Version called "Fast Taker".

== Track listing ==
No.	Title	Lyrics	Music	Length
1.	"Serial Killer"	T.Clark, Bulgaropulos, Geremia	Zissel	2:34
2.	"http://www.Planetwide-Suicide.com"	Bulgaropulos, Geremia	Bulgaropulos	4:03
3.	"Hard Rock Dinosaur"	Clark, Bulgaropulos, Geremia	Bulgaropulos	4:15
4.	"Queen of Hearts"	Clark, Bulgaropulos, Geremia	Zissel	5:12
5.	"U-R-B"	Bulgaropulos, Geremia	Bulgaropulos	3:59
6.	"Mr. Superlover"	M. Kipness, Bulgaropulos, Geremia	Thorwarth	3:53
7.	"Tankard Roach Motel"	Clark, Bulgaropulos, Geremia	Thorwarth	3:48
8.	"Another Perfect Day"	Kipness, Bulgaropulos, Geremia	Zissel	3:20
9.	"Death by Whips"	Bulgaropulos, Geremia	Bulgaropulos	3:31
10.	"Away!"	Kipness, Bulgaropulos, Geremia	Zissel	3:54
11.	"Face of the Enemy"	Kipness, Bulgaropulos, Geremia	Zissel	3:06
12.	"Splendid Boyz"	Bulgaropulos, Geremia	Bulgaropulos	3:01
13.	"Disco Destroyer"	Bulgaropulos, Geremia	Zissel, Bulgaropulos	1:16
Total length:				45:53

2002 reissue bonus tracks
No.	Title	Lyrics	Length
14.	"Fast Taker (Manowar cover) [Bouns track]"	Ross the Boss, Joey DeMaio	3:16
Total length:			49:08

== Personnel ==
- Andreas "Gerre" Geremia – vocals
- Frank Thorwarth – bass
- Andy Bulgaropulos – guitars
- Olaf Zissel – drums
- Guest/session musicians
- Andy Gutjahr – guitars on 14 tracks
- Martin Christian – backing vocals
- Markus Corby – backing vocals
