= One Foot in the Grave (disambiguation) =

One Foot in the Grave is a British television sitcom.

One Foot in the Grave may also refer to:

- One Foot in the Grave (Beck album), 1994
- One Foot in the Grave (Tankard album), 2017
- "One Foot in the Grave" (song), the theme tune to the sitcom, sung by Eric Idle
- "One Foot in the Grave" (Kittie song), from the 2024 album Fire
- "One Foot in the Grave" (Doctors), a 2004 television episode
