= Kings of Beer =

Studio album by Tankard
- Released: 28 April 2000
- Recorded: January–February 2000
- Genre: Thrash metal
- Length: 49:39
- Label: Century Media
- Producer: Harris Johns

Tankard chronology
Disco Destroyer (1998)	Kings of Beer (2000)	B-Day (2002)

Professional ratings
Review scores
Source	Rating
Blabbermouth.net	(7.5/10)

Kings of Beer is the ninth studio album by German thrash metal band Tankard, released on 28 April 2000. It is their first album with guitarist Andy Gutjahr. The album was re-released by AFM Records in 2007 with a cover version of Metallica's "Damage, Inc.".

== Track listing ==
No.	Title	Lyrics	Music	Length
1.	"Flirtin' with Desaster"	Geremia, M. Kipness	Gutjahr, Thorwarth, Zissel	4:03
2.	"Dark Exile"	A. Bulgaropulos, Geremia	Gutjahr, Thorwarth, Zissel	4:53
3.	"Hot Dog Inferno"	Bulgaropulos	Bulgaropulos	3:26
4.	"Hell Bent for Jesus"	Geremia, Kipness	Gutjahr, Thorwarth, Zissel	4:20
5.	"Kings of Beer"	Geremia, Kipness	Gutjahr, Thorwarth, Zissel	5:38
6.	"I'm So Sorry!"	Geremia, K. Pohl	Gutjahr, Thorwarth, Zissel	3.12
7.	"Talk Show Prostitute"	Geremia, Kipness	Gutjahr, Thorwarth, Zissel	4:35
8.	"Incredible Loudness"	Geremia	Thorwarth	3:44
9.	"Land of the Free"	Geremia, Kipness	Gutjahr, Thorwarth, Zissel	5:09
10.	"Mirror, Mirror"	Geremia, Kipness	Gutjahr, Thorwarth, Zissel	4:21
11.	"Tattoo Coward"	Geremia, Pohl	Gutjahr, Thorwarth, Zissel	4:02
12.	"Damage, Inc."	James Hetfield, Kirk Hammett, Cliff Burton, Lars Ulrich	Gutjahr, Thorwarth, Zissel	5:10
Total length:				49:39

== Personnel ==
- Andreas "Gerre" Geremia - vocals
- Frank Thorwarth - bass
- Andy Gutjahr - guitar
- Olaf Zissel - drums

Guest/session musicians

- Andy Boulgaropoulos - guitar, backing vocals
- Alex Wenzel - vocals
- Timon Schreiber - vocals
- Ölse Maier - Vocals
- Harris Johns - Vocals
