= Fire & Damnation =

Studio album by Exumer
- Released: 6 April 2012
- Recorded: 2011 in Dortmund and Haltern
- Genre: Thrash metal
- Length: 43:40
- Label: Metal Blade
- Producer: Waldemar Sorychta

Exumer chronology
Rising from the Sea (1987)	Fire & Damnation (2012)	The Raging Tides (2016)

Fire & Damnation is the third studio album by the German thrash metal band Exumer. It was released 25 years after the band's previous album, Rising from the Sea (1987), on 6 April 2012 in Europe and 10 April in North America, through Metal Blade Records.

The album was engineered and produced by Waldemar Sorychta. Drums were recorded at Waldstreetsound Studio in Dortmund, all guitars and vocals were recorded at Sonarklang Studio in Haltern. Fire & Damnation was mixed by Sorychta and Dennis Koehne at Flying Pigs Studio in Schwerte.

The album features a re-recording of "Fallen Saint" from Possessed by Fire (1987).

== Track listing ==
No.	Title	Lyrics	Music	Length
1.	"Fire & Damnation"	Mem V. Stein	Ray Mensh	3:16
2.	"Vermin of the Sky"	V. Stein	Mensh	3:16
3.	"The Weakest Limb"	V. Stein	Mensh	3:50
4.	"New Morality"	V. Stein	Mensh	3:07
5.	"Waking the Fire"	V. Stein	Paul Arakari	3:13
6.	"Fallen Saint"	V. Stein	Mensh	3:54
7.	"Crushing Point"	V. Stein	Mensh	3:01
8.	"Devil Chaser"	V. Stein	Mensh	2:42
9.	"I Dare You"	Arakari	Mensh	3:40
10.	"Tribal Furies"	V. Stein	Mensh	3:31

Limited edition
No.	Title	Lyrics	Music	Length
11.	"Destructive Solution (Live)"	V. Stein	Mensh	3:12
12.	"A Mortal in Black (Live)"	V. Stein	Mensh	3:52
13.	"Xiron Darkstar (Live)"	V. Stein	Mensh	3:04

== Personnel ==
- Mem V. Stein – vocals
- Ray Mensh – guitar
- H.K. – guitar
- T. Schiavo – bass
- Matthias Kassner – drums
- Waldemar Sorychta – engineer, producer
- Dennis Koehne – mixing, mastering
