= Ratos de Porão =

Brazilian crossover thrash band

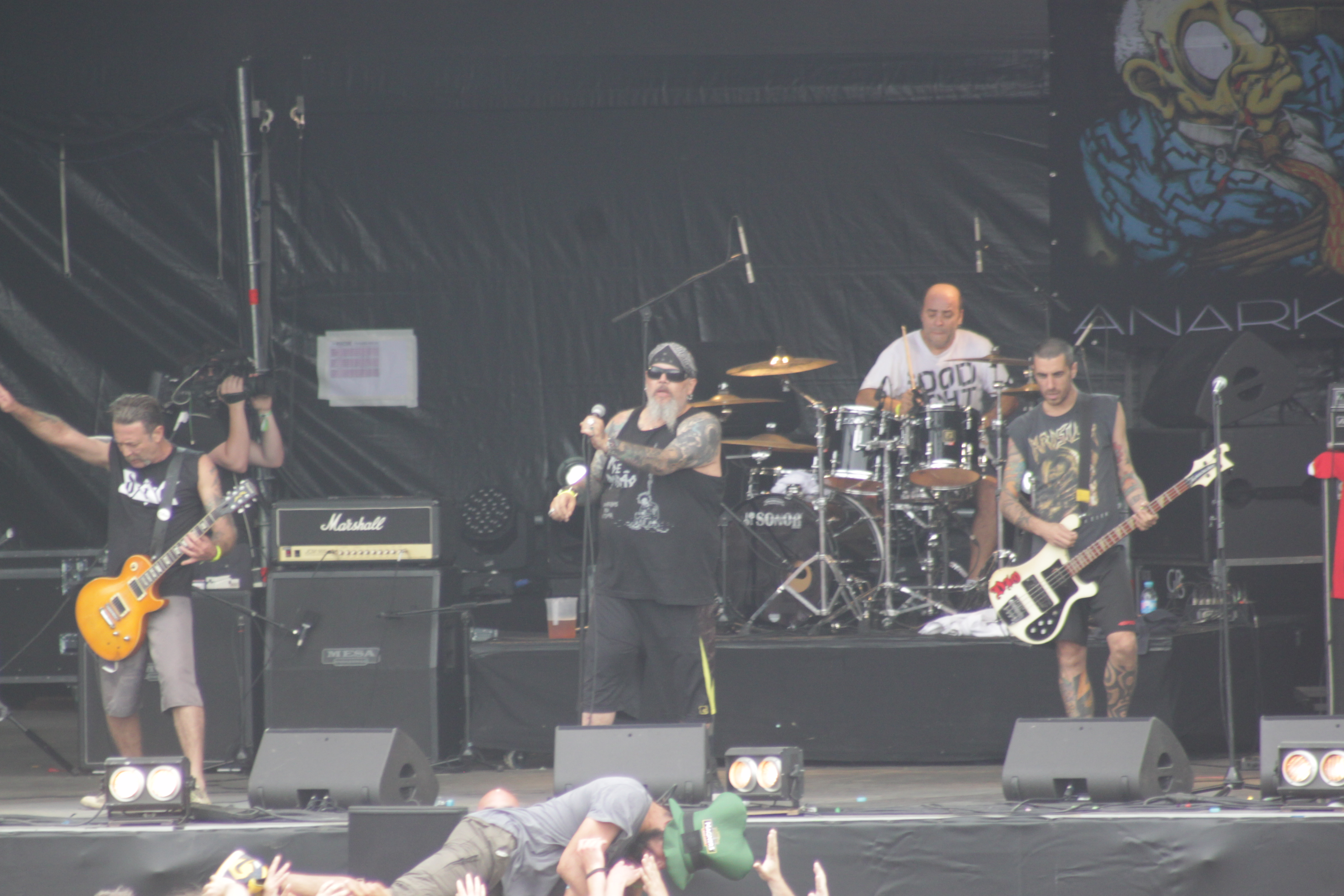
- Ratos de Porão at Hellfest 2016

Background information
- Origin: São Paulo, Brazil
- Genres: Crossover thrash; thrash metal; hardcore punk; D-beat
- Years active: 1981–present
- Members: João Gordo; Jão; Juninho; Boka
- Past members: Betinho; Mingau; Jabá; Walter Bart; Pica-Pau; Fralda; Spaghetti; Chiquinho
- Website: rdpeido.com.br

Ratos de Porão (Portuguese for "Basement Rats") is a Brazilian crossover thrash band from São Paulo. They were formed in 1981, toured South America, North America, Asia, and Europe, and continue to play today. Their core lineup of João Gordo on vocals and Jão on drums and later guitars has remained since the band's beginning.

== History ==
=== Early days ===
Ratos de Porão, or "RxDxPx", was formed in November 1981, within the Brazilian (São Paulo city) punk rock scene (alongside bands such as Olho Seco, Cólera, Inocentes, Garotos Podres, and Lobotomia). Influenced by UK 82 hardcore bands such as Discharge, Charged G.B.H., Chaos U.K., The Varukers and Swedish and Finnish bands such as Anti-Cimex and Kaaos, they started to write songs criticizing Brazilian society, a novel concept at the time. Their sound is regarded as one of the rawest of their scene. Other bands, such as Cólera and Garotos Podres, were more punk rock than hardcore punk.

Their first album was released in 1983, Crucificados pelo sistema. Released on the Ataque Frontal label, it was one of the best-selling hardcore albums to come out of the country, and was considered a punk classic worldwide. The line up was João Gordo (vocals), Mingau (guitar – later in many punk and pop bands in Brazil, currently playing in Ultraje a Rigor), Jabá (bass) and Jão (drums). Soon after, with the fall of the São Paulo punk scene because of gang violence, the band split up. Since then, João Gordo has been accused of betraying the DIY ethics of the hardcore punk movement for several alleged reasons. He has said, "I'm a traitor since 1983, because I told the guys I played hardcore, not punk. Then, I got labelled.(...)That's a stigma".

=== Initial crossover thrash era ===
In 1985, RxDxPx came back, in the original line-up: Jão, Jabá, Betinho. However, after a short time, Gordo returned to the band, who brought proposals to play crossover thrash music, the musicians agreed, but after a short time Betinho left the group and was replaced by Spaghetti. Jão switched over to playing guitar. Subsequently, they released the Descanse Em Paz album on Baratos Afins in 1986.

With their new sound, they began to associate more with heavy metal bands, becoming friends with longtime RxDxPx fans Sepultura and other bands of the Brazilian 1980s metal scene, including Korzus and Anthares. Their next studio release with Baratos Afins Records, 1987's Cada Dia Mais Sujo e Agressivo, was also released in an English-language version (Dirty and Aggressive) (the band feared that their English was so grammatically inaccurate that many of their native English speaking fans might ridicule their translated lyrics). This release continued the band's D-beat drum tempos.

In 1989, they signed to Roadrunner Records at the urging of Igor Cavalera of Sepultura, who played one of the band's tapes for the label's executives. RxDxPx then went to Germany to record their next studio LP, Brasil. With Harris Johns of Voivod and Tankard producing, the band's production quality improved substantially in contrast to their previous releases; the instrumentation was noticeably more technical.

In 1990, they returned to Germany to record their last album with the "classic" line-up of João Gordo, Jão, Jabá and Spaghetti. With Harris Johns acting again as producer, their next album titled Anarkophobia was met with criticism by some fans for being the band's most metallic release to date, having considerably more complex and lengthy song compositions and more technical musicianship. Nevertheless, Anarkophobia increased their profile within the worldwide metal scene of the early 1990s.

But in mid-1991, they had their first line-up change in years, with Spaghetti leaving the band, citing that he had "been tired of the musical life". They auditioned several drummers to replace him, including Beto Silesci from Korzus, but the band decided that Silesci's style was too metal for the new direction they were planning to pursue. Silesci was in turn replaced with Boka of the Santos Beach thrash/death metal band Psychic Possessor. In 1992, RxDxPx released its first official live album, called RDP Vivo, with a corresponding music video for the song "Aids, Pop, Repressão" receiving heavy air play on Furia Metal of MTV (the Brazilian equivalent of Headbangers Ball).

At the decline of the thrash scene, under tension and personal problems (Jabá left the band and they had a heavy drug problem), they entered into the studio in 1994 to record their only 'all lyrics in English' album, called Just Another Crime in Massacreland. The album suffered a thin production and a low promotion by the label, and it was a hard time in the life of RxDxPx.

=== Return to hardcore punk ===
After the departure of Jabá, the band had several different bass players and recorded a studio album with only punk and hardcore covers called Feijoada Acidente?, a play on the Guns N' Roses album "The Spaghetti Incident?". (Feijoada is a traditional food from Brazil, a stew based on beans and pork.) There were two versions of this album: one covering only Brazilian bands such as Olho Seco, Lobotomia, Garotos Podres, among others; and one covering only non-Brazilian bands such as G.B.H., Black Flag, Anti-Cimex, Minor Threat, among others. At this time, Walter Bart (who used to play in a punk band called "Não Religião") and "Pica Pau" (Portuguese for woodpecker), who stayed in the band until 1999, played bass.

Released in 1997, Carniceria Tropical marked a return to hardcore and Portuguese lyrics, and the band regained their former success. The same year, João Gordo started to work as a VJ for MTV Brasil.

In 1999, the bassist Cristian "Fralda", who used to play in the punk rock band Blind Pigs joined the band, and they entered into the studio to re-record their first album, and called this album Sistemados Pelo Crucifa (a play on the original album title, "Crucificados Pelo Sistema"). The front cover was designed by the Korzus bassist, Dick Siebert.

=== Return to crossover ===
In 2002, they released the Onisciente Coletivo album, which was more thrash metal influenced once again, mixing their 1980s and 1990s styles. Bassist Cristian "Fralda" left to join the old hardcore/crossover/thrash band Lobotomia. In his place, bass player Paulo Júnior joined the band, an underground musician who still plays with his hardcore band "Discarga" and is guitarist of "Point of No Return".

In 2006, they released Homem Inimigo Do Homem.

On 13 August 2013, Ratos de Porão announced on their Facebook page that they were working on a new album. Entitled Século Sinistro, the album was released on 27 May 2014.

Another eight years passed until the release of their eleven studio album, Necropolítica, released on 20 May 2022.

== Band members ==
=== Current members ===
- João "Jão" Carlos Molina Esteves – guitar, backing vocals (1981, 1982, 1985–present), drums (1983–1984), lead vocals (1981, 1982–1983, 1985)
- João Gordo Francisco Benedan – lead vocals (1983–1984, 1985-present)
- Maurício "Boka" Alves Fernandez – drums (1991–present)
- Paulo "Juninho" Sergio Sangiorgio Júnior – bass, backing vocals (2004–present)

=== Former members ===
- Chiquinho – vocals (1981)
- Roberto "Betinho" Massetti – drums (1981–1983, 1985)
- Jarbas "Jabá" Alves – bass (1981–1993, died in 2023)
- Rinaldo "Mingau" Amaral – guitar (1982-1984)
- Nelson "Spaghetti" Evangelista Jr. - drums (1986–1991)
- Walter Bart – bass (1993–1994)
- Rafael "Pica-Pau" Piccoli Lobo – bass (1995–1999)
- Christian "Fralda" Wilson – bass (2000–2004)

== Discography ==
- Crucificados pelo Sistema (1984)
- Descanse em Paz (1986)
- Cada Dia Mais Sujo e Agressivo (1987)
- Brasil (1989)
- Anarkophobia (1991)
- Just Another Crime... in Massacreland (1993)
- "Feijoada Acidente?" – Brasil (1995)
- "Feijoada Acidente?" – International (1995)
- Carniceria Tropical (1997)
- Sistemados pelo Crucifa (2000)
- Onisciente Coletivo (2002)
- Homem Inimigo do Homem (2006)
- Século Sinistro (2014)
- Necropolítica (2022)
- Isentön Päunokü (EP) (2023)
