= Stone Cold Sober =

Stone Cold Sober may refer to

- Stone Cold Sober (album), a 1992 album by Tankard, or the title song
- "Stone Cold Sober" (Paloma Faith song), 2009
- "Stone Cold Sober" (Brantley Gilbert song), 2015
- "Stone Cold Sober", a song by Rod Stewart, from the 1975 album Atlantic Crossing
- "Stone Cold Sober", a song by Del Amitri, from the 1989 album Waking Hours
- "Stone Cold Sober", a song by Crawler, from the 1977 album Crawler
