= Rising from the Sea =

Studio album by Exumer
- Released: 21 July 1987
- Recorded: 1987 in Stuttgart, Germany
- Genre: Thrash metal
- Length: 35:55; 53:20 (reissue)
- Label: Disaster Records
- Producer: Tommy Ziegler, Exumer

Exumer chronology
Possessed by Fire (1986)	Rising from the Sea (1987)	Fire & Damnation (2012)

Professional ratings
Review scores
Source	Rating
Chronicles of Chaos	9/10 stars
Rock Hard	7/10 stars

Rising from the Sea is the second studio album by the German thrash metal band Exumer. It was released on 21 July 1987 through Disaster Records. The album was produced by Tommy Ziegler and Exumer at Zuckerfabrik Studio in Stuttgart.

== Track listing ==
Original pressing

No.	Title	Lyrics	Music	Length
1.	"Winds of Death" (on most original pressings, it contains an eight-second intro to the album)	Paul Arakari	Ray Mensh	4:14
2.	"Rising from the Sea"	Arakari	Mensh	5:25
3.	"Decimation"	Arakari	Mensh	2:41
4.	"The First Supper"	Arakari	Mensh	4:51
5.	"Unearthed"	Arakari	Mensh	5:12
6.	"Shadows of the Past"	Arakari	Mensh	4:26
7.	"Are You Deaf?"	Arakari	Mensh	2:07
8.	"I Dare You"	Arakari	Mensh	3:46
9.	"Ascension Day"	Arakari	Mensh	3:12
Total length:				35:55

2001 reissue bonus tracks

No.	Title	Lyrics	Music	Length
10.	"Whips and Chains (Demo)" (taken from the 1989 demo album Whips & Chains)	John Cadden	Mensh	5:49
11.	"Lil Ol' Me (Demo)" (taken from the 1989 demo album Whips & Chains)	Cadden	Mensh	6:27
12.	"Time Out (Demo)" (taken from the 1989 demo album Whips & Chains)	Cadden	Mensh	4:27
Total length:				53:20

== Personnel ==
- Paul Arakari – vocals, bass
- Ray Mensh – guitar
- Bernie Siedler – guitar, backing vocals
- Syke Bornetto – drums
- Tommy Ziegler – producer
