= Alle gegen Alle =

Studio album by Slime
- Released: 1983 (Germany)
- Studio: Music Lab Studios
- Genre: Punk rock
- Label: Aggressive Rockproduktionen
- Producer: Harris Johns

Slime chronology
Yankees raus (1982)	Alle gegen Alle (1983)	Live (1984)

Alle gegen alle is the third album by the German punk rock band Slime, released in 1983.

== Track listing ==
1. "Linke Spiesser" (Left Squares) – 2:07
2. "Störtebecker" – 2:12
3. "Untergang" (Downfall) – 2:31
4. "Zu kalt" (Too Cold) – 2:50
5. "Ihr seid schön" (You're So Nice) – 2:59
6. "Religion" – 3:16
7. "Nazis raus" (Nazis Out) (Betoncombo cover) – 2:12
8. "Sand im Getriebe" (Sand in the Transmission) – 2:09
9. "Alle gegen Alle" (Everybody vs. Everybody) – 3:02
10. "Etikette tötet" (Etiquette Kills) – 3:20
11. "Ich will nicht werden" (I don't want to become) (Ton Steine Scherben cover) – 3:22
12. "Tod" (Death) – 1:52
13. "Junge, Junge" (Boy, oh Boy) (Buddy Holly cover) – 1:42
14. "Guter Rat ist teuer" (Good advice is pricey) – 2:39
