= Drei Flaschen =

German band

Drei Flaschen ("three bottles") is a German band, formed in 1995 in Berlin.

After their first show ever the band was asked to play as supporting act for The Exploited and so they did.

In June 1997 their self-produced low-budget-debut ...mit Sossää ?!? was released in Europe. With the assistance of Lifestyle Records of Toronto it was released a few months later in Canada. There it charted into the college radio charts. It was also released in the United States.

In 1998 the band released 12 live bonus tracks on Me And My Sk8board.

The band in 1999 released its first live longplayer called Kaisers Of Metal.

Their current album is called Die Rebellion steckt im Detail.

In May 2002, the band released full length split CD together with Argentina's punk rockers Argies.

In June 2005, the band released the vinyl only "1.Mai" EP produced by Harris Johns (worked before e.g. with Slipknot, Sepultura and Einstürzende Neubauten)

The band toured Germany, Austria, Switzerland, Italy, the Netherlands, Denmark, Czech Republic, Poland, Australia, New Zealand, the United States, Argentina, Brazil and even South Africa.

They played their final show on January 27, 2007 at the White Trash in Berlin and released the DVD "This cannot be the truth" the same day.
