= Vol(l)ume 14 =

Studio album by Tankard
- Released: 17 December 2010
- Recorded: 2010
- Genre: Thrash metal
- Length: 50:22
- Label: AFM Records

Tankard chronology
Thirst (2008)	Vol(l)ume 14 (2010)	A Girl Called Cerveza (2012)

Professional ratings
Review scores
Source	Rating
Metal Hammer	5.0/7 stars
Thrash	(7.9/10)
AllMusic	3.0/5 stars
Blabbermouth.net	3/10 stars

Vol(l)ume 14 is the fourteenth studio album by the German thrash metal band Tankard, released through AFM Records.

== Track listing ==
No.	Title	Length
1.	"Time Warp"	6:01
2.	"Rules for Fools"	3:55
3.	"Fat Snatchers (The Hippo Effect)"	5:12
4.	"Black Plague (BP)"	4:24
5.	"Somewhere in Nowhere"	4:09
6.	"The Agency"	5:04
7.	"Brain Piercing öf Death"	4:20
8.	"Beck's in the City"	3:29
9.	"Condemnation"	6:23
10.	"Weekend Warriors"	7:25
Total length:		50:22

== Personnel ==
- Andreas "Gerre" Geremia - vocals
- Andy Gutjahr - guitar
- Frank Thorwarth - bass, backing vocals
- Olaf Zissel - drums
