= Crucificados pelo Sistema =

Studio album by Ratos de Porão
- Released: 1984
- Recorded: 1983
- Genre: D-beat; hardcore punk
- Length: 19:01
- Label: Punk Rock Discos
- Producer: Fabião

Ratos de Porão chronology
Crucificados pelo Sistema (1984)	Descanse Em Paz (1986)

Crucificados pelo Sistema (transl. Crucified by the System) is the debut album by Brazilian crossover thrash band Ratos de Porão, which was released in 1984 through Punk Rock Discos. In July 2016, it was elected by Rolling Stone Brasil as the best Brazilian punk rock album.

== Track listing ==
No.	Title	Length
1.	"Morrer" (To Die)	1:26
2.	"Caos" (Chaos)	0:17
3.	"Guerra Desumana" (Inhuman War)	1:23
4.	"Agressão/Repressão" (Aggression/Repression)	1:22
5.	"Obrigando a Obedecer" (Forcing to Obey)	1:03
6.	"Asas da Vingança" (Wings of Revenge)	1:12
7.	"Que Vergonha!" (What a Shame!, Olho Seco cover)	0:51
8.	"Poluição Atômica" (Atomic Pollution)	1:00
9.	"Pobreza" (Poverty)	1:02
10.	"F.M.I." (IMF)	1:14
11.	"Só Pensa em Matar" (Only Thinks about Killing)	2:16
12.	"Sistema de Protesto" (System of Protest)	1:36
13.	"Não Me Importo" (I Don't Care)	1:19
14.	"Periferia" (Shantytown)	1:03
15.	"Crucificados pelo Sistema" (Crucified by the System)	1:23
16.	"Corrupção" (Corruption)	0:38
Total length:		19:01

== Personnel ==
- João "Gordo" Francisco Benedan - vocals
- Rinaldo "Mingau" Amaral - guitar
- Jarbas "Jabá" Alves - bass
- João "Jão" Carlos Molina Esteves - drums
