= The Beauty and the Beer =

Studio album by Tankard
- Released: 26 May 2006
- Recorded: 2005–2006
- Genre: Thrash metal
- Length: 45:55
- Label: AFM Records
- Producer: Andy Classen

Tankard chronology
Beast of Bourbon (2004)	The Beauty and the Beer (2006)	Thirst (2008)

Professional ratings
Review scores
Source	Rating
Blabbermouth.net	(7/10)

The Beauty and the Beer is the twelfth studio album by German thrash metal band Tankard released on 26 May 2006.

== Track listing ==
No.	Title	Length
1.	"Ice-olation"	5:10
2.	"We Still Drink the Old Ways"	4:05
3.	"Forsaken World"	4:33
4.	"Rockstars No. 1"	4:05
5.	"The Beauty and the Beast"	6:05
6.	"Blue Rage - Black Redemption"	4:05
7.	"Frankfurt: We Need More Beer"	3:49
8.	"Metaltometal"	4:50
9.	"Dirty Digger"	5:34
10.	"Shaken Not Stirred"	3:36
Total length:		45:55

== Personnel ==
- Andreas "Gerre" Geremia - vocals
- Andy Gutjahr - guitar
- Frank Thorwarth - bass, backing vocals
- Olaf Zissel - drums
