= A Girl Called Cerveza =

Studio album by Tankard
- Released: 27 July 2012
- Recorded: 2012
- Genre: Thrash metal
- Length: 50:14
- Label: Nuclear Blast
- Producer: Michael Mainx

Tankard chronology
Vol(l)ume 14 (2010)	A Girl Called Cerveza (2012)	R.I.B. (2014)

A Girl Called Cerveza is the fifteenth studio album by the German thrash metal band Tankard released through Nuclear Blast Records, released on 27 July 2012.

== Track listing ==
No.	Title	Length
1.	"Rapid Fire (A Tyrant's Elegy)"	5:12
2.	"A Girl Called Cerveza"	4:14
3.	"Witchhunt 2.0"	5:42
4.	"Masters of Farces"	4:08
5.	"The Metal Lady Boy" (feat. Doro Pesch)	4:59
6.	"Not One Day Dead (But Mad One Day)"	4:01
7.	"Son of a Fridge"	5:53
8.	"Fandom at Random"	5:28
9.	"Metal Magnolia"	5:07
10.	"Running on Fumes"	5:30
11.	"The Prisoner" (Japanese edition bonus track)	5:15
Total length:		50:14

== Personnel ==
- Andreas "Gerre" Geremia - vocals
- Andy Gutjahr - guitar
- Frank Thorwarth - bass, backing vocals
- Olaf Zissel - drums
