= Yankees raus =

Studio album by Slime
- Released: 1982 (Germany)
- Genre: Punk rock
- Label: Aggressive Rockproduktionen
- Producer: Thomas Baur

Slime chronology
Slime I (1981)	Yankees raus (1982)	Alle gegen Alle (1982)

Yankees raus is the second album by Slime. It was released in 1982.

== Track listing ==
1. "Yankees raus" (Yankees Out)
2. "Kauf oder stirb" (Buy or Die)
3. "Alptraum" (Nightmare)
4. "Pseudo" (Pseudo)
5. "Wieder breit" (Drunk Again)
6. "Greensleeves"
7. "Bundeswehr" (Army)
8. "Gerechtigkeit" (Justice)
9. "Gewinnen werden immer wir" (We're Always Gonna Win)
10. "Block E" (Block E)
11. "Denken ist der Tod" (You'll Die When You Think)
12. "Legal, illegal, scheissegal" (Legal, Illegal, Fucking Equal)
13. "Demokratie" (Democracy)
14. "Wenn der Himmel brennt" (When Heaven is Burning)
