= Stone Cold Sober (album) =

Studio album by Tankard
- Released: 9 June 1992
- Recorded: February 1992 in Musiclab Studio, Berlin
- Genre: Thrash metal
- Length: 59:03; 61:43 (re-release)
- Label: Noise Records
- Producer: Harris Johns

Tankard chronology
| The Meaning of Life (1990) | Stone Cold Sober (1992) | Two-Faced (1994) |

Professional ratings
Review scores
| Source | Rating |
|---|---|
| Rock Hard | 9/10 |
| MusikReviews.de | 12/15 stars |

Stone Cold Sober is the fifth studio album by German thrash metal band Tankard. It was released on 9 June 1992 and reissued in 2005 by Nuclear Blast.

== Track listing ==
| No. | Title | Lyrics | Music | Length |
|---|---|---|---|---|
| 1. | "Jurisdiction" | Geremia, Thomas Clark | Katzmann | 5:41 |
| 2. | "Broken Image" | Geremia, Clark | Katzmann | 5:30 |
| 3. | "Mindwild" | Geremia, Clark | Bulgaropulos | 4:59 |
| 4. | "Ugly Beauty" | Geremia, Clark | Tunn | 5:09 |
| 5. | "Centerfold" (The J. Geils Band cover) | Seth Justman | Seth Justman | 3:23 |
| 6. | "Behind the Back" | Geremia, Clark | Katzmann | 4:40 |
| 7. | "Stone Cold Sober" | Geremia, Clark | Tunn | 5:53 |
| 8. | "Blood, Guts & Rock'n'Roll" | Geremia, Clark | Katzmann | 5:33 |
| 9. | "Lost and Found (Tantrum Part 2)" | Geremia, Clark | Thorwarth | 5:30 |
| 10. | "Sleeping with the Past" | Geremia, Clark | Katzmann | 4:15 |
| 11. | "Freibier" | Geremia, Katzmann | Katzmann | 3:29 |
| 12. | "Of Strange Talking People Under Arabian Skies" (instrumental) | | Bulgaropulos | 7:41 |
| 13. | "Outro" | | | 0:24 |
| Total length: | | | | 59:03 |

2005 re-release bonus tracks (from the Open All Night home video)
| No. | Title | Length |
|---|---|---|
| 14. | "Don't Panic" (Live in East Berlin) | 5:01 |
| 15. | "666 Packs" (Live in East Berlin) | 5:04 |
| 16. | "Shit-Faced" (Live in East Berlin) | 4:24 |
| Total length: | | 61:43 |

== Personnel ==
- Andreas "Gerre" Geremia – vocals
- Frank Thorwarth – bass
- Andy Boulgaropoulos – guitars
- Axel Katzmann – guitars
- Arnulf Tunn – drums
