= Beast of Bourbon =

Studio album by Tankard
- Released: 22 March 2004
- Recorded: November 2003
- Genre: Thrash metal
- Length: 42:13
- Label: AFM Records
- Producer: Andy Classen

Tankard chronology
B-Day (2002)	Beast of Bourbon (2004)	The Beauty and the Beer (2006)

Professional ratings
Review scores
Source	Rating
Chronicles of Chaos	(8.5/10)

Beast of Bourbon is the eleventh studio album by German thrash metal band Tankard on 22 March 2004.

== Track listing ==
No.	Title	Length
1.	"Under Friendly Fire"	3:04
2.	"Slipping from Reality"	4:16
3.	"Genetic Overkill"	4:38
4.	"Die with a Beer in Your Hand"	5:33
5.	"The Horde"	4:16
6.	"Endless Pleasure"	4:51
7.	"Dead Men Drinking"	3:51
8.	"Alien Revenge"	3:36
9.	"Fistful of Love"	4:43
10.	"Beyond the Pubyard"	3:25

Bonus track
No.	Title	Length
11.	"We're Coming Back" (Cock Sparrer cover)	3:29
Total length:		45:42

== Personnel ==
- Andreas "Gerre" Geremia - vocals
- Andy Gutjahr - guitar
- Frank Thorwarth - bass, backing vocals
- Olaf Zissel - drums
- Additional backing vocals by Chris Luft, Alex Wenzel, and Harald Maul
