= Anarkophobia =

Studio album by Ratos de Porão
- Released: 1991
- Recorded: Music Lab Studio, Berlin, Germany
- Genre: Crossover thrash
- Length: 36:11
- Label: Eldorado
- Producer: Harris Johns

Ratos de Porão chronology
Brasil (1989)	Anarkophobia (1991)	RDP au vivo (1992)

Professional ratings
Review scores
Source	Rating
Allmusic	3/5 stars

Anarkophobia is the fifth studio album by the Brazilian band, Ratos de Porão, simply known as RxDxPx. Although a hardcore punk band in its early days, since the previous album RDP had been adding new influences, and Anarkophobia falls much more into the crossover thrash genre. It was released in 1991 by Roadrunner Records and follows the band's breakthrough record from 1989, Brasil. Like its predecessor, it was recorded in Berlin, Germany, and was produced by Harris Johns.

== Overview ==
Musically, the album shows more of a slant towards thrash metal than hardcore punk as the band's popularity grew, although it did include a cover version of "Commando" by The Ramones as a reminder of its punk rock roots.

The lyrics are socio-political – more akin to hardcore punk – and it was released with two versions, one in Portuguese and another in English with an emerging American and an "out of Brazil better understanding" interest in mind.

== Track listing ==
No.	Title	Length
1.	"Contando os Mortos" (Counting the Dead)	4:50
2.	"Morte ao Rei" (Death of the King)	3:33
3.	"Sofrer" (Born to Suffer)	3:12
4.	"Ascenção e Queda" (Rise and Fall)	2:05
5.	"Mad Society"	3:59
6.	"Ódio" ((All I Need Is) Hatred)	4:58
7.	"Anarkophobia"	3:44
8.	"Igreja Universal" (Universal Church)	3:43
9.	"Commando" (Ramones cover)	1:45
10.	"Escravo da TV" (TV Slave)	4:23
Total length:		36:11

== Credits ==
- João Gordo – lead vocals
- Jão – guitar
- Jabá – bass guitar
- Spaghetti – drums
- Recorded at Music Lab Studio, Berlin, Germany
- Produced by Harris Johns
- Engineered by Angelo Platte
- Cover art by Marcatti
