= Rubberslime =

Punk rock band

- Genres: Punk rock
- Years active: 2003-
- Members: Michael "Elf" Mayer, Minne (ex-Rubbermaids), Reiner Titan, Dynamike (ex-Rubbermaids and Roh)
- Past members: Dirk Jora (Slime) (until 2005)

Rubberslime is a supergroup that is mostly composed of members from the punk bands Slime and Rubbermaids.

The five Hamburg natives founded this band for the occasion of a solidarity concert for FC St. Pauli. They played a mix of Slime and Rubbermaids classics, as well as new songs. In November 2005, their frontman Dirk Jora left the band for personal reasons. Since then, Elf and Minne have become the main singers and the band has no intentions on hiring a replacement.

== Discography ==
- 2003 - Viva St. Pauli (single)
- 2004 - First Attack (album)
- 2005 - Rock'n'Roll Genossen (album)
