= Wenn der Himmel brennt =

Album

Wenn der Himmel brennt ("When the sky is burning") is the official DVD of Slime. It contains two DVDs with video and audio tracks. The DVD was released in 2003. The records were made between 1978 and 1995. The songs are recorded partly in English.

== Track list ==
=== DVD 1 ===
1. A.C.A.B
2. Bundeswehr (The German army)
3. They don't give a fuck
4. We're always gonna win
5. I wish I was
6. Demokratie (Democracy)
7. Karlsquell
8. Polizei SA SS (Police SA SS)
9. Deutschland (Germany)
10. Streefight
11. Hey Punk
12. Yankees out
13. Sex & Violence
14. TV- song
15. I just wanna know
16. D.O.R.F. (V.I.L.L.A.G.E.)
17. Nazis raus (Nazis out)
18. Junge Junge (Oh Boy)
19. Yankees raus (Yankees out)
20. Linke Spießer (Left Squares)
21. D.I.S.C.O.
22. Sand im Getriebe (Sand in the transmission)
23. Großer Bruder (Big Brother)
24. Wenn der Himmel brennt (When the sky is burning)
25. Die Letzten (The last)
26. Computerstaat (computer state)

=== DVD 2 ===
1. A.C.A.B.
2. legal-Illegal-Scheißeigal (German: "legal-illegal- I don't care")
3. Alle gegen alle ("Everyone against everyone")
4. Albtraum ("Nightmare")
5. Zu kalt ("Too Cold")
6. 4. Reich
7. Störtebeker
8. Deutschland ("Germany")
9. Hey Punk
10. Iran
11. Gerechtigkeit ("Justice")
12. Seekarten ("Nautical Charts")
13. Religion
14. Untergang ("Downfall")
15. Wind
16. Der Tod ist ein Meister aus Deutschland ("The Death is a Master from Germany")
17. Schweineherbst ("Pig Fall")

=== Audio Tracks ===
1. Hey Punk
2. Iran
3. Ich hasse (German: "I Hate")
4. Keine Führer ("No Leaders")
5. A.C.A.B.
6. Karlsquell
7. D.I.S.C.O.
8. Deutschland (Germany)
9. Zehn kleine Nazischweine ("Ten Little Nazi Pigs")
10. Schicksalsspiel ("Game of Destiny")
11. Der Tod ist ein Meister aus Deutschland ("The Death is a Master from Germany")
12. Schweineherbst ("Pig Fall")
13. Krieg in den Städten (War in the Cities")
14. We must bleed
