= Schweineherbst =

Studio album by Slime
- Released: 1994
- Genre: Punk rock
- Label: Indigo
- Producer: Slime

Slime chronology
Viva la muerte (1992)	Schweineherbst (1994)	Punkclub Live Grosse Freiheit in Hamburg (1995)

Schweineherbst ("Pigs Fall") is the fifth studio-album by German punk rock band Slime. In it, they again criticise the politics of Germany.

== Track listing ==
1. Schweineherbst (Pigs fall)
2. Stillstand (Standstill)
3. Zweifel (Doubt)
4. Feuer (Fire)
5. Hoffnung (Hope)
6. Zusammen (Together)
7. Gewalt (Violence)
8. Der Tod ist ein Meister aus Deutschland (Death is a Master from Germany)
9. Ich war dabei (I was present)
10. Brüllen, zertrümmern und weg (Yelling, crashing and away)
11. Die Leere (The emptiness)
12. Joe ist zurück (Joe is back)
13. Aufrecht gehen (Going uprightly)
14. Genug (Enough)
15. Goldene Türme (Golden Towers)
