= Chemical Invasion =

Studio album by Tankard
- Released: October 1987
- Recorded: June–August 1987
- Studio: Musiclab Studio, Berlin
- Genre: Thrash metal
- Length: 39:21
- Label: Noise Records
- Producer: Harris Johns

Tankard chronology
Zombie Attack (1986)	Chemical Invasion (1987)	The Morning After (1988)

Professional ratings
Review scores
Source	Rating
Rock Hard	9/10

Chemical Invasion is the second studio album by German thrash metal band Tankard, released in October 1987.

== Reception ==
Reviews have been "generally positive" after its release. A review from Rock Hard gave it a high review, praising it as an improvement over their debut album; Stating how it's far better in terms of songwriting and playing technique. "Chemical Invasion is certainly anything but boring," they claimed while also praising the riffs, powerful rhythm work, and Gerre's merciless bawling as giving the nine songs character.

== Track listing ==
No.	Title	Lyrics	Music	Length
1.	"Intro"			0:17
2.	"Total Addiction"	Geremia, Kipness	Katzmann	3:26
3.	"Tantrum"	Geremia, Kipness	Thorwarth	3:15
4.	"Don't Panic"	Geremia, Kipness	Katzmann	4:25
5.	"Puke"	Geremia, Kipness	Katzmann	0:58
6.	"For a Thousand Beers" (instrumental)		Bulgaropulos	7:23
7.	"Chemical Invasion"	Geremia, Kipness	Katzmann	5:27
8.	"Farewell to a Slut"	Werner	Werner	4:10
9.	"Traitor"	Geremia, Kipness	Katzmann	7:56
10.	"Alcohol" (Gang Green cover)	Chris Doherty, Chuck Stilphen	Gang Green	2:04
11.	"Outro"			0:07

== Personnel ==
- Andreas "Gerre" Geremia – vocals
- Andy Boulgaropoulos – guitar
- Axel Katzmann – guitar
- Frank Thorwarth – bass, backing vocals
- Oliver "O.W." Werner – drums
