= Slime I =

Studio album by Slime
- Released: 1981 (Germany)
- Genre: Punk rock
- Label: Raubbau
- Producer: Slime, Thomas Baur

Slime chronology
Slime I (1981)	Yankees raus (1982)

Slime I is the debut album by Slime. In May 2011, 30 years after its release, it was "indexed" by the Federal Department for Media Harmful to Young Persons onto the "List of Media Harmful to Young People", making its sale to minors illegal. The track "Bullenschweine" was subjected to repeated censorship proceedings.

== Track listing ==
1. "We Don't Need The Army"
2. "Artificial"
3. "A.C.A.B."
4. "I Wish I Was"
5. "They Don't Give A Fuck"
6. "Robot Age"
7. "Streetfight"
8. "Karlsquell"
9. "Hey Punk"
10. "D.I.S.C.O."
11. "D.O.R.F." (V.I.L.L.A.G.E.)
12. "Deutschland Muss Sterben“ (Germany must die)
13. "Bullenschweine" (cop pigs)
14. "1,7-Promille-Blues"
