= Punkclub Live Grosse Freiheit in Hamburg =

Live album by Slime
- Released: 1995
- Genre: Punk

Punkclub Live Grosse Freiheit in Hamburg is the second live album, and the last album overall, of German band Slime. It was released in 1995.

== Track listing ==
1. "Schweineherbst" ("Pig Fall")
2. "Zusammen" ("Together")
3. "Alle gegen alle"
4. "Albtraum" ("Nightmare")
5. "Stillstand" ("Standstill")
6. "Feuer" ("Fire")
7. "Zu kalt" ("Too cold")
8. "Untergang" ("Downfall")
9. "Brüllen, zertümmern und weg ("yelling, crashing and away")
10. "Störtebecker"
11. "Red nicht - geh los" ("Don't talk - get it on")
12. "Ettikette tötet" ("Etiquette kills")
13. "Zweifel" ("Doubt")
14. "Seekarten" ("Nautical charts")
15. "Mensch" ("Man") hidden track: Deutschland (Germany)
16. "Gewalt" ("Violence")
17. "Wenn der Himmel brennt" ("When the sky is burning")
18. "Religion" hidden track: Polizei SA SS (Police SA SS)
19. "Der Tod ist ein Meister aus Deutschland" ("Death is a master from Germany")
