= Thirst (Tankard album) =

Studio album by Tankard
- Released: 19 December 2008
- Recorded: 2008
- Genre: Thrash metal
- Length: 46:39
- Label: AFM Records
- Producer: Andy Classen

Tankard chronology
The Beauty and the Beer (2006)	Thirst (2008)	Vol(l)ume 14 (2010)

Thirst is the thirteenth studio album by German thrash metal band Tankard, released on 19 December 2008. The limited edition of this album was sold with a bonus DVD.

== Track listing ==
No.	Title	Length
1.	"Octane Warriors"	5:07
2.	"Deposit Pirates"	5:13
3.	"Stay Thirsty!"	4:39
4.	"Hyperthermia"	3:47
5.	"Echoes of Fear"	3:59
6.	"When Daddy Comes to Play"	5:34
7.	"Zodiac Man"	4:28
8.	"G.A.L.O.W. (Gods and Legends of War)"	3:50
9.	"Myevilfart"	3:50
10.	"Sexy Feet Under"	6:12
Total length:		46:39

== Reception ==
Professional ratings
Review scores
Source	Rating
About.com	3.5/5 stars
Rock Hard	8/10 stars
Metal Hammer	5/7 stars

== Personnel ==
- Andreas "Gerre" Geremia - vocals
- Andy Gutjahr - guitar
- Frank Thorwarth - bass, backing vocals
- Olaf Zissel - drums
