= Harris Johns =

German record producer

Harris Johns is a German music producer, active since the late-1970s in the heavy metal and punk scene, working for a lot of big-name bands, such as Helloween, Coroner, Tankard, Sodom, Voivod, Kreator, Exumer, Ratos de Porão, Slime, Daily Terror and many others. Most of his productions were recorded at his studio Music Lab Berlin Studio. After 10 years recording in a former guest house in the countryside near Berlin, which he called Spiderhouse, he reopened the Music Lab Berlin in 2007 and gave it up 2016. He is still producing and teaching music production skills.

== Works ==
Some of the hundreds of albums he produced:

- Slime – Alle gegen Alle (1983)
- Daily Terror – Aufrecht (1984)
- Grave Digger – Heavy Metal Breakdown (1984)
- Helloween – Walls of Jericho (1985)
- Grave Digger – Witch Hunter (1985)
- Coroner – R.I.P. (1986)
- Celtic Frost – Tragic Serenades (1986)
- Kreator – Pleasure to Kill (1986)
- Kreator – Flag of Hate (1986)
- Exumer – Possessed by Fire (1986)
- Tankard – Chemical Invasion (1987)
- Tankard – The Morning After (1988)
- Voivod – Killing Technology (1987)
- Voivod – Dimension Hatröss (1988)
- Sodom – Persecution Mania (1987)
- Sodom – Agent Orange (1989)
- Hobbs Angel Of Death -Hobbs' Angel of Death (1988)
- Ratos de Porão – Brasil (1989)
- Pestilence – Consuming Impulse (1989)
- Ratos de Porão – Anarkophobia (1990)
- Napalm – Zero To Black (1990)
- Immolation – Dawn of Possession (1991)
- Sodom – Tapping the Vein (1992)
- Depressive Age – Lying in Wait (1994)
- Slime – Schweineherbst (1994)
- Saint Vitus – Die Healing (1995)
- Occult – "Enemy Within" (1996)
- Sodom – 'Til Death Do Us Unite (1997)
- Die Skeptiker – Wehr Dich (1998)
- Sodom – Code Red (1999)
- Sodom – M-16 (2001)
- Nail Within – Nail Within (2003)
- Enthroned – XES Haereticum (2004)
- Drei Flaschen – 1.Mai (2005)
- Johnnie Rook – Out of the Nook (2007)
- Enthroned – Tetra Karcist (2007)
- Toxpack – Cultus Interruptus (2007)
- Whiplash – Unborn Again (2009)
- Toxpack – Epidemie (2009)
- Soifass – Hypokrit (2010)
- Assassin – Breaking the Silence (2010/11)
- Toxpack – Bastarde von Morgen (2011)
- Hellbringer – Dominion of Darkness (2012)
- KhaoZ – Twist the Knife a Little Deeper (2013)
- Eastside Boys – Irgendwas ist immer (2014)
- Morgengrau – Blood Oracle (2018)
- Protector – Summon the Hordes (2019)

== Sources ==
- von Appen, Ralf, and Thorsten Hindrichs (Hg.) (2020): One Nation Under a Groove. »Nation« als Kategorie populärer Musik. Beiträge zur Popularmusikforschung, Bd. 46. Bielefeld: transcript Verlag.
