= One Foot in the Grave (Tankard album) =

Studio album by Tankard
- Released: 2 June 2017
- Genre: Thrash metal
- Length: 48:25
- Label: Nuclear Blast

Tankard chronology
R.I.B (2014)	One Foot in the Grave (2017)	Hymns for the Drunk (2018)

One Foot in the Grave is the seventeenth studio album by the German thrash metal band Tankard. It was released on 2 June 2017, on the Nuclear Blast label.

== Critical reception ==
Professional ratings
Review scores
Source	Rating
Metal Hammer (Germany)	6/7
Metal Hammer (UK Press)	7/10
Rock Hard	8/10

Metal Hammer Germany called the track "Arena of the True Lies" a catchy continuation of the band's previous album R.I.B and cited "Syrian Nightmare" as being singer Gerre's expression of anger about the current political situation in the Middle East. The reviewer for Rock Hard, too, praised the album as being catchy with strong lyrics, although he found the riffs too unoriginal for a thrash release.

== Track listing ==
No.	Title	Length
1.	"Pay to Pray"	5:22
2.	"Arena of the True Lies"	5:08
3.	"Don't Bullshit Us!"	3:56
4.	"One Foot in the Grave"	4:47
5.	"Syrian Nightmare"	4:31
6.	"Northern Crown (Lament of the Undead King)"	4:22
7.	"Lock'Em Up!"	4:10
8.	"The Evil That Men Display"	3:14
9.	"Secret Order 1516"	7:23
10.	"Sole Grinder"	5:28
Total length:		48:25

== Personnel ==
- Andreas "Gerre" Geremia – vocals
- Andreas Gutjahr – guitar
- Frank Thorwarth – bass
- Olaf Zissel – drums

== Charts ==
Chart (2017)	Peak position
German Albums (Offizielle Top 100)	26
Swiss Albums (Schweizer Hitparade)	96
