= Possessed by Fire =

1986 studio album by Exumer

Studio album by Exumer
- Released: 8 November 1986
- Recorded: 1986 at Musiclab Studious, Berlin, Germany
- Genre: Thrash metal
- Length: 35:20; 50:16 (reissue)
- Label: Disaster
- Producer: Harris Johns

Exumer chronology
Possessed by Fire (1986)	Rising from the Sea (1987)

Professional ratings
Review scores
Source	Rating
Chronicles of Chaos	9/10 stars

Possessed by Fire is the first studio album by the German thrash metal band Exumer. It was released on 8 November 1986 through Disaster Records. The album was produced by Harris Johns at Music Lab Berlin.

== Track listing ==
No.	Title	Lyrics	Music	Length
1.	"Possessed by Fire"	Mem V. Stein	Ray Mensh	4:55
2.	"Destructive Solution"	V. Stein	Mensh	3:46
3.	"Fallen Saint"	V. Stein	Mensh	4:01
4.	"A Mortal in Black"	V. Stein	Mensh	4:02
5.	"Sorrows of the Judgement"	V. Stein	Mensh	3:10
6.	"Xiron Darkstar"	V. Stein	Mensh	3:11
7.	"Reign of Sadness"	V. Stein	Mensh	3:41
8.	"Journey to Oblivion"	V. Stein	Mensh	4:20
9.	"Silent Death"	V. Stein	Mensh	5:03

2001 reissue
No.	Title	Length
1.	"Intro"	0:58
2.	"Possessed by Fire"	3:57
3.	"Destructive Solution"	3:48
4.	"Fallen Saint"	4:01
5.	"A Mortal in Black"	4:04
6.	"Sorrows of the Judgement"	3:11
7.	"Xiron Darkstar"	3:12
8.	"Reign of Sadness"	3:41
9.	"Journey to Oblivion"	4:19
10.	"Silent Death"	5:03
11.	"A Mortal in Black" (demo)	4:28
12.	"Scanners" (demo)	3:41
13.	"Silent Death" (demo)	5:47

== Personnel ==
- Mem V. Stein – vocals, bass
- Ray Mensh – guitar
- Bernie Siedler – guitar, backing vocals
- Syke Bornetto – drums
- Harris Johns – producer
