= Tankard (band) =

German thrash metal band

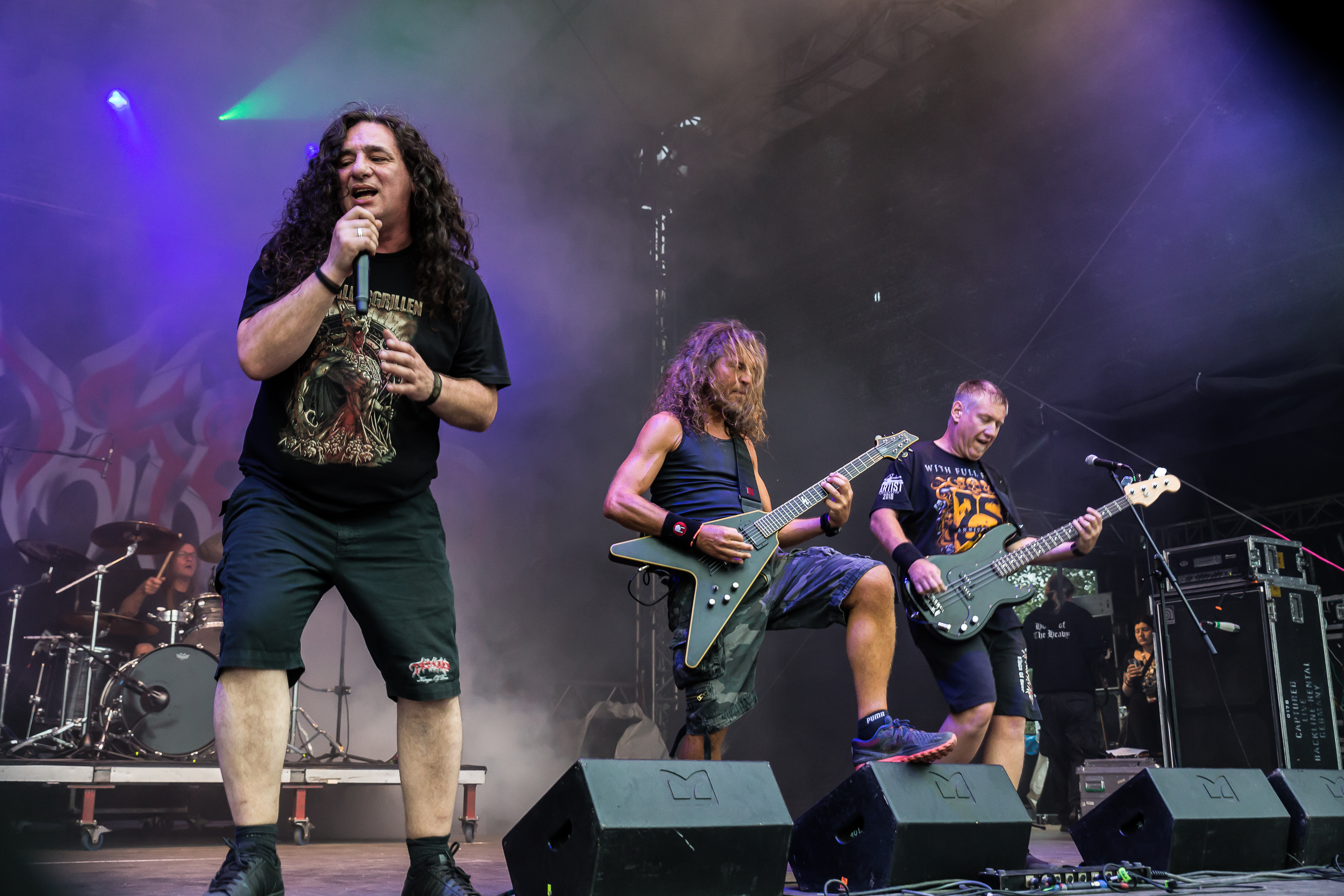
- Tankard performing at With Full Force 2018

Background information
- Origin: Frankfurt, Germany
- Genre: Thrash metal
- Years active: 1982–present
- Labels: Nuclear Blast; Noise; Century Media; AFM
- Members: Andreas Geremia; Andreas Gutjahr; Frank Thorwarth; Gerd Lücking
- Past members: Bernhard Rapprich; Axel Katzmann; Oliver Werner; Andy Bulgaropulos; Arnulf Tunn; Olaf Zissel
- Website: tankard.info

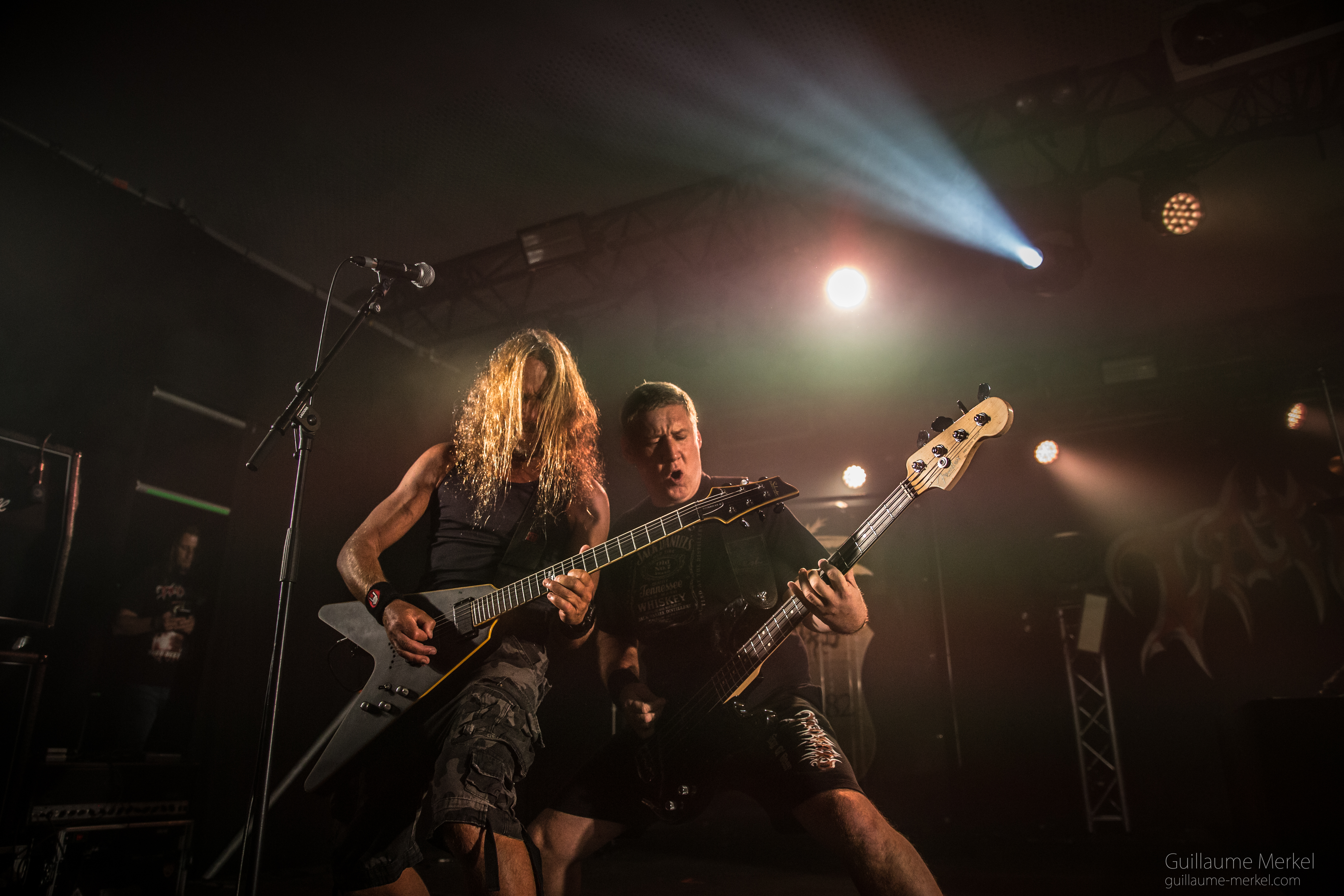
Tankard performing in 2017

Tankard is a German thrash metal band from Frankfurt, founded in 1982. Alongside Kreator, Destruction and Sodom, Tankard is often considered one of the "Big Four" of Teutonic thrash metal. Stylistically, Tankard has consistently played thrash metal that thematically centres primarily on alcohol reverence, unlike the remaining "Big Teutonic Four" (Kreator, Destruction and Sodom), who are all known for covering such topics related to death, politics, violence and anti-fascism.

== History ==
=== Formation and early years (1982–1985) ===
Tankard was formed in 1982 by three classmates, bassist Andreas "Gerre" Geremia, guitarist Axel Katzmann and vocalist Frank Thorwarth. Thorwarth and Gerre soon switched roles; at the same time the trio added drummer Oliver Werner and second guitarist Bernhard Rapprich. They chose their name from a dictionary upon seeing its definition as "beer mug". Their earliest written song was called "Ray Death", a song about nuclear war and their first gig was played in a local classroom in 1983. As drinking alcohol in the school was banned, they smuggled their beer in with milk cartons. Soon after, Bernhard Rapprich left the band as his conservative father did not want him "hanging around with a bunch of drunks" and he was replaced by Andy Bulgaropoulos.

With the lineup now stabilised, the band released their first demo, titled Heavy Metal Vanguard, in 1984. After this, the band toured with fellow German thrashers Sodom. SPV were interested in signing both bands, but allegedly SPV retracted a deal after seeing the band perform live. In 1985, they released a second demo, Alcoholic Metal, which cemented their thrash metal style and lyrical themes. Both of these demos were very popular in the underground, and on the strength of this demo they signed with Noise Records. The eight-track demo also features rough versions of four songs that would later appear on their debut album, Zombie Attack.

=== The Noise years (1986–1995) ===
Zombie Attack was released in July 1986. In October 1987 their sophomore album, Chemical Invasion, was released, with the album art being the first of eight done for the band by artist Sebastian Krüger, followed a year later by The Morning After. Both of these albums were produced by Harris Johns, who would go on to produce all of the band's albums up to 2000. However, shortly after the release of compilation Hair of the Dog, original drummer Oliver Werner quit the band to be replaced by Arnulf Tunn, and the band released three albums with this lineup: The Meaning of Life, Stone Cold Sober and Two-Faced. They also recorded the live album Fat, Ugly and Live during this time. This lineup then folded when Tunn was replaced by Olaf Zissel, who remained in the band until 2024, in May 1994 and the next year founding member Axel Katzmann was forced to leave due to osteoarthritis in the wrist. That year the band released The Tankard, which is widely viewed as a very good album by fans and critics alike, and is their final album with Noise.

=== Later career (1995–present) ===
The band decided not to replace Katzmann and remain a one guitar band. Also, after the release of The Tankard, the band signed with Century Media Records. After the release of Disco Destroyer, longtime guitarist Andy Bulgaropoulos left the band to spend more time with his family. He was replaced by Andreas Gutjahr, forming the longest-lived lineup of the band. The first album released with Gutjahr was Kings of Beer, which was their second and final studio album with Century Media. The band signed with AFM Records and release five studio albums in a decade with the label, starting with B-Day and ending with Vol(l)ume 14. On 27 July 2012, the band announced their signing with Nuclear Blast and released their first album with the label, A Girl Called Cerveza, that day. Also that year, they released a four-way split with Sodom, Kreator and Destruction called The Big Teutonic 4. This release cemented them as a major force in German metal. They released another studio album, R.I.B. on 20 June 2014.

In 2015, Olaf Zissel was hospitalised with what was suspected to be a stroke. He was replaced temporarily by Gerd Lücking of Holy Moses. Their latest album achieved no. 41 on the German charts. While they have built a fan base, they continue to have day jobs.

Tankard's 17th studio album One Foot in the Grave, was released on 2 June 2017. The band released its 18th studio album, Pavlov's Dawgs, on 30 September 2022. A music video was made for the song "Lockdown Forever", directed by Renatus Töpke.

On 20 June 2024, drummer Olaf Zissel had departed Tankard and was replaced by Gerd Lücking. As part of the "Big Teutonic" four series, the band performed together with Kreator, Sodom and Destruction for the first time on 20 July 2024 at the Klash of the Ruhrpott festival, which took place at Amphitheater Gelsenkirchen in Gelsenkirchen, Germany. Tankard is currently working on new material for their next album, which is planned for release in 2026.

== Band members ==
Band members live at Rock & Metal Day'z 2026 at Oschersleben

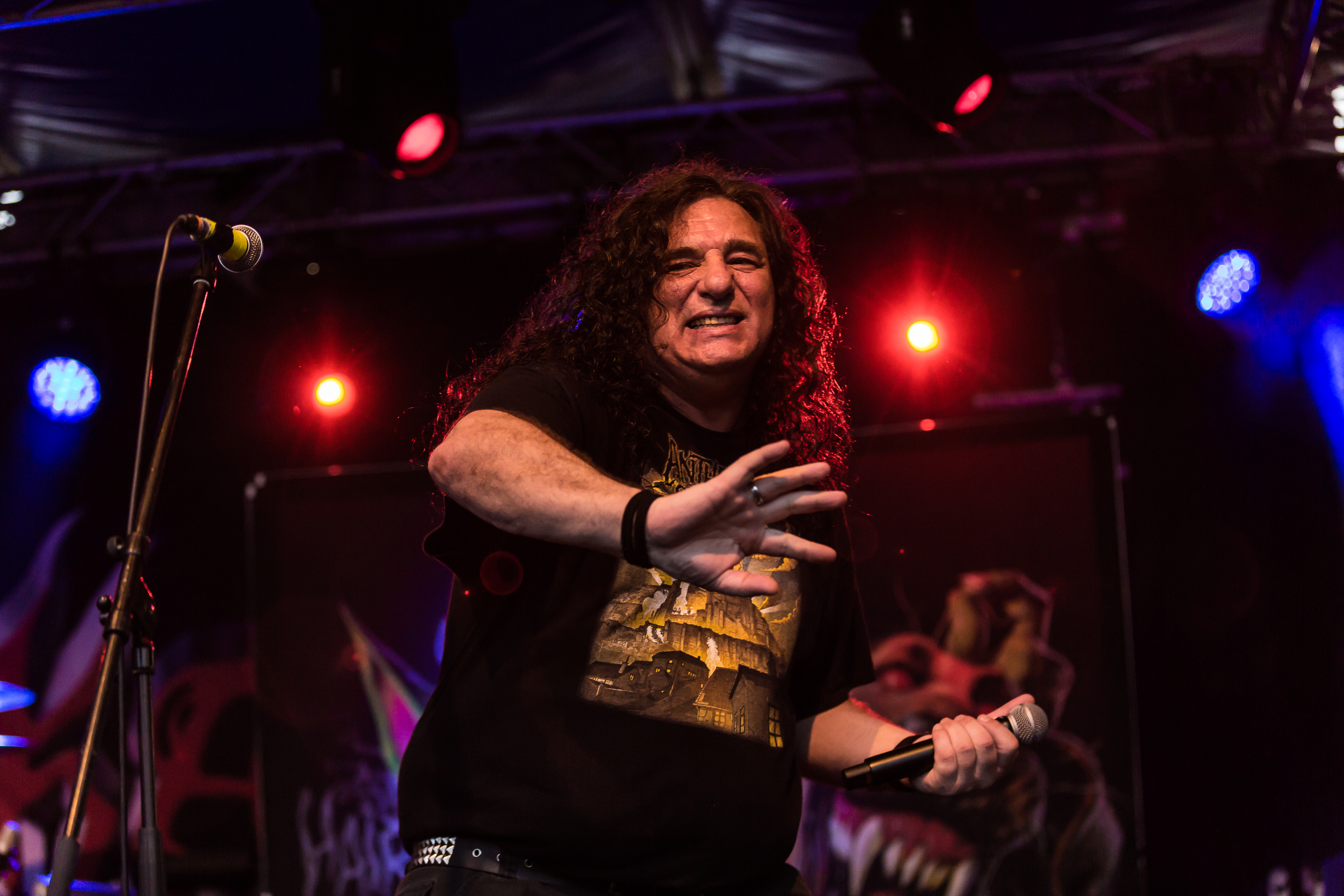
Andreas "Gerre" Geremia, vocals

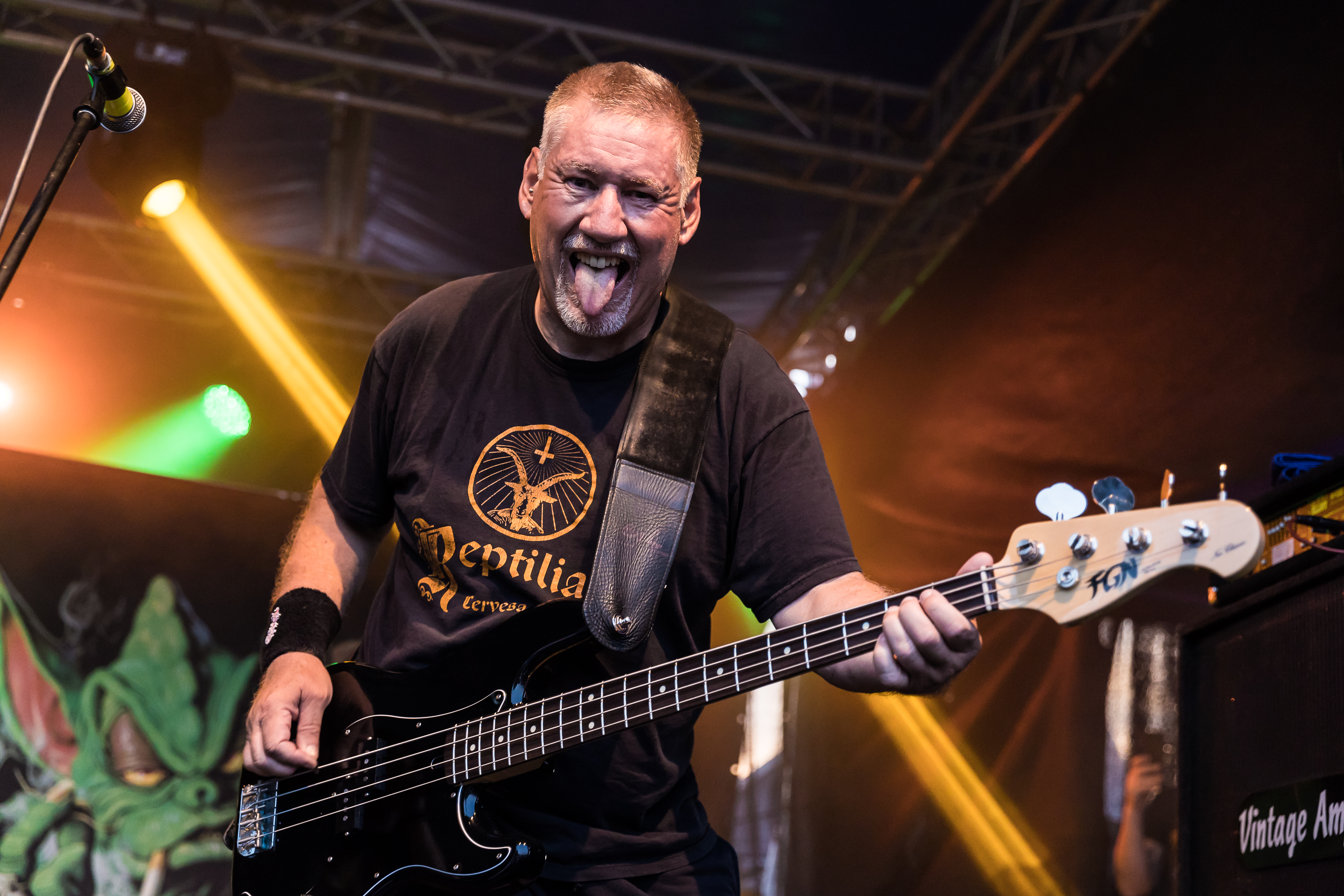
Frank Thorwarth, bass

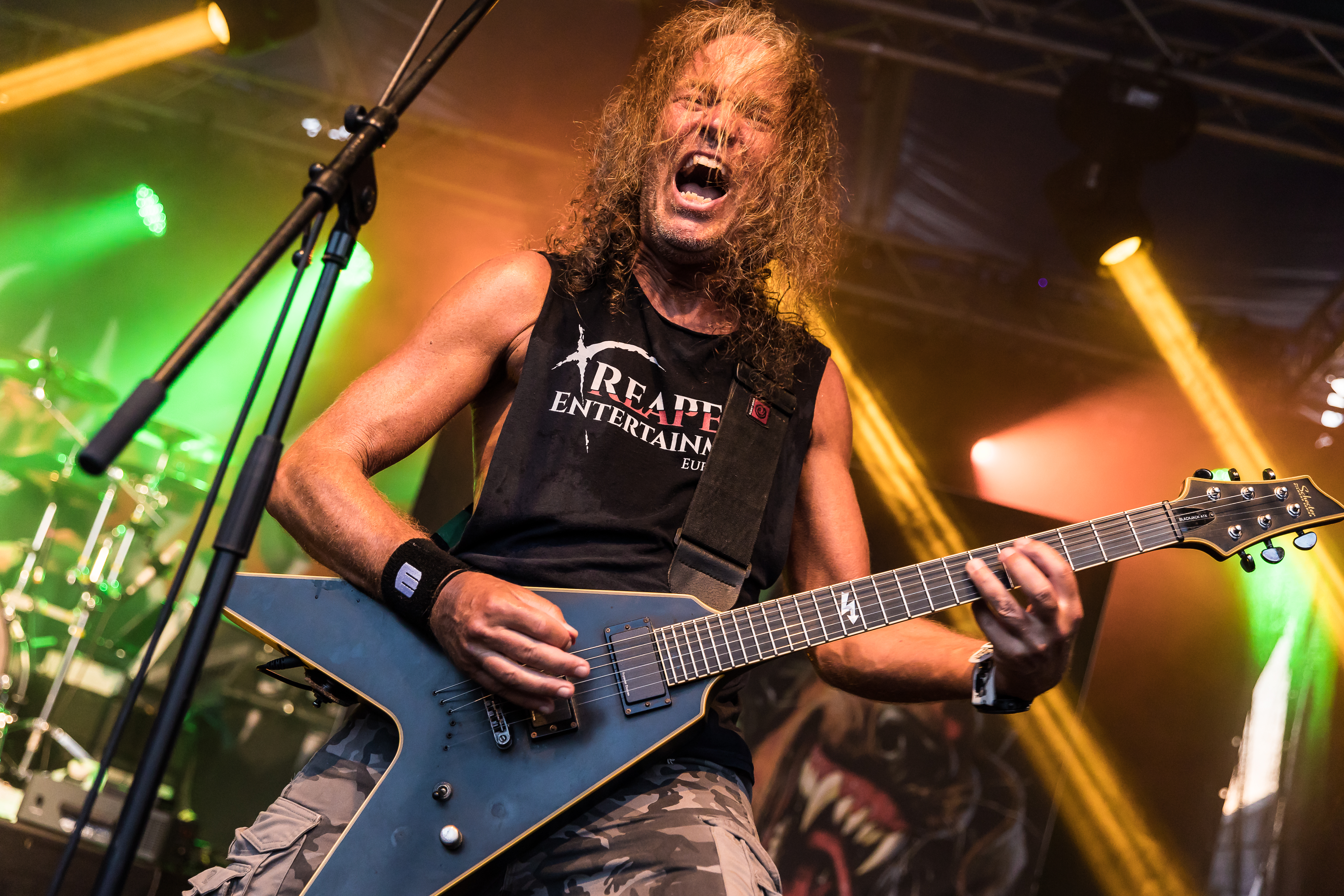
Andy Gutjahr, guitars

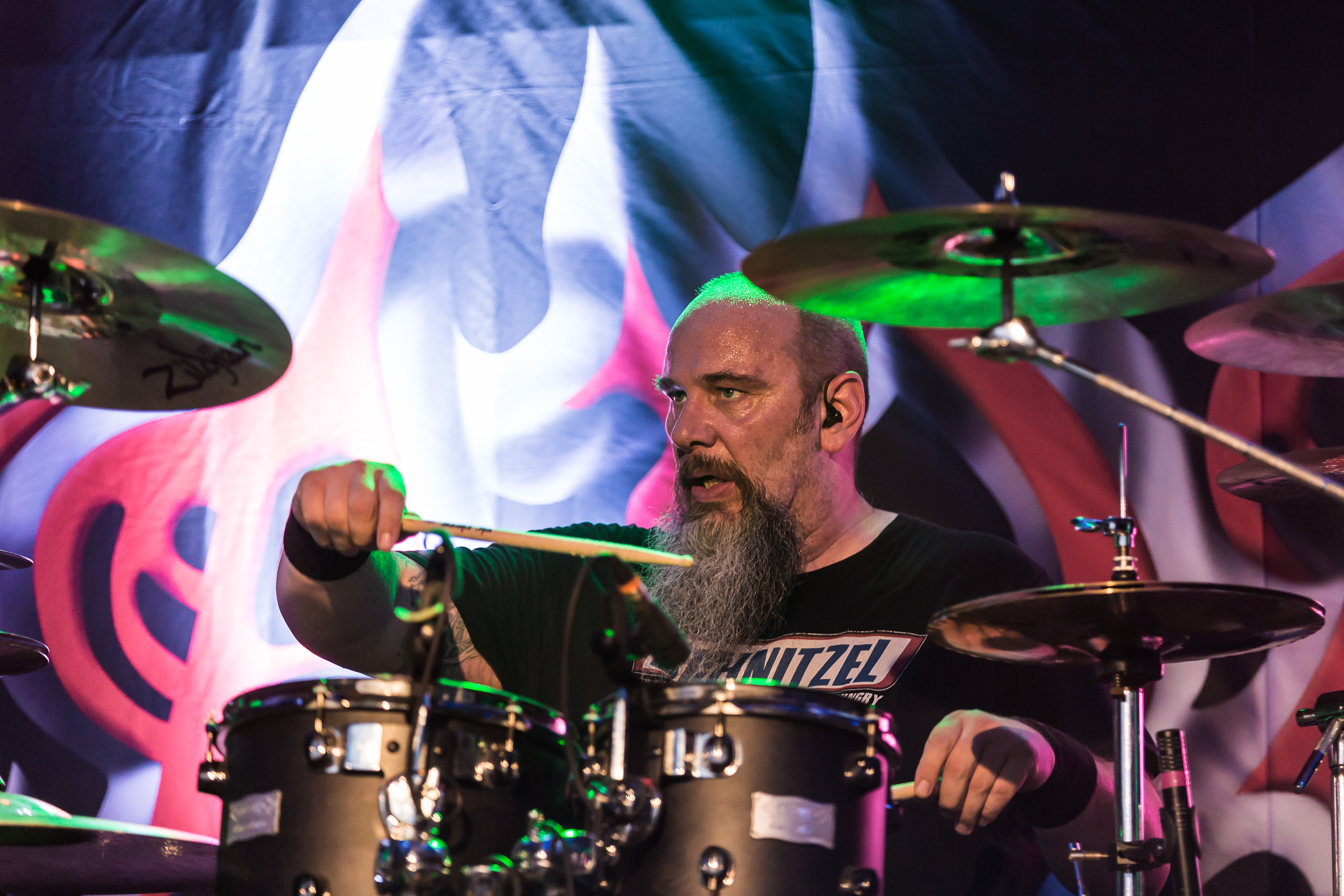
Gerd Lücking, drums

=== Current ===
- Andreas "Gerre" Geremia – vocals (1982–present)
- Frank Thorwarth – bass (1982–present)
- Andreas Gutjahr – guitars (1999–present)
- Gerd Lücking – drums (2024–present)

=== Former ===
- Oliver Werner – drums (1982–1989)
- Axel Katzmann – guitars (1982–1995)
- Andy Bulgaropulos – guitars (1983–1999)
- Bernhard Rapprich – guitars (1982–1983)
- Arnulf Tunn – drums (1989–1994)
- Olaf Zissel – drums (1994–2024)

== Discography ==
=== Studio albums ===
Release date	Title	Label
1986	Zombie Attack	Noise Records
1987	Chemical Invasion	Noise Records
1988	The Morning After	Noise Records
1990	The Meaning of Life	Noise Records
1992	Stone Cold Sober	Noise Records
1994	Two-Faced	Noise Records
1995	The Tankard	Noise Records
1996	Himbeergeist Zum Frühstück	Century Media
1998	Disco Destroyer	Century Media
2000	Kings of Beer	Century Media
2002	B-Day	AFM Records
2004	Beast of Bourbon	AFM Records
2006	The Beauty and the Beer	AFM Records
2008	Thirst	AFM Records
2010	Vol(l)ume 14	AFM Records
2012	A Girl Called Cerveza	Nuclear Blast
2014	R.I.B.	Nuclear Blast
2017	One Foot in the Grave	Nuclear Blast
2022	Pavlov's Dawgs	Reaper Entertainment

=== Other releases ===
- Heavy Metal Vanguard (1984) – demo
- Alcoholic Metal (1985) – demo
- Alien (1989) – EP
- Hair of the Dog (1989) – compilation
- Open All Night (1990) – video
- Fat, Ugly and Live (1991) – live album
- Fat, Ugly and Still (A) Live (2005) – DVD
- Best Case Scenario: 25 Years in Beers (2007) – re-recorded compilation album
- Schwarz-weiß wie Schnee (2017) – EP
- Hymns for the Drunk (2018) – compilation
- For a Thousand Beers (2022) – boxed set
