= Exumer =

German thrash metal band

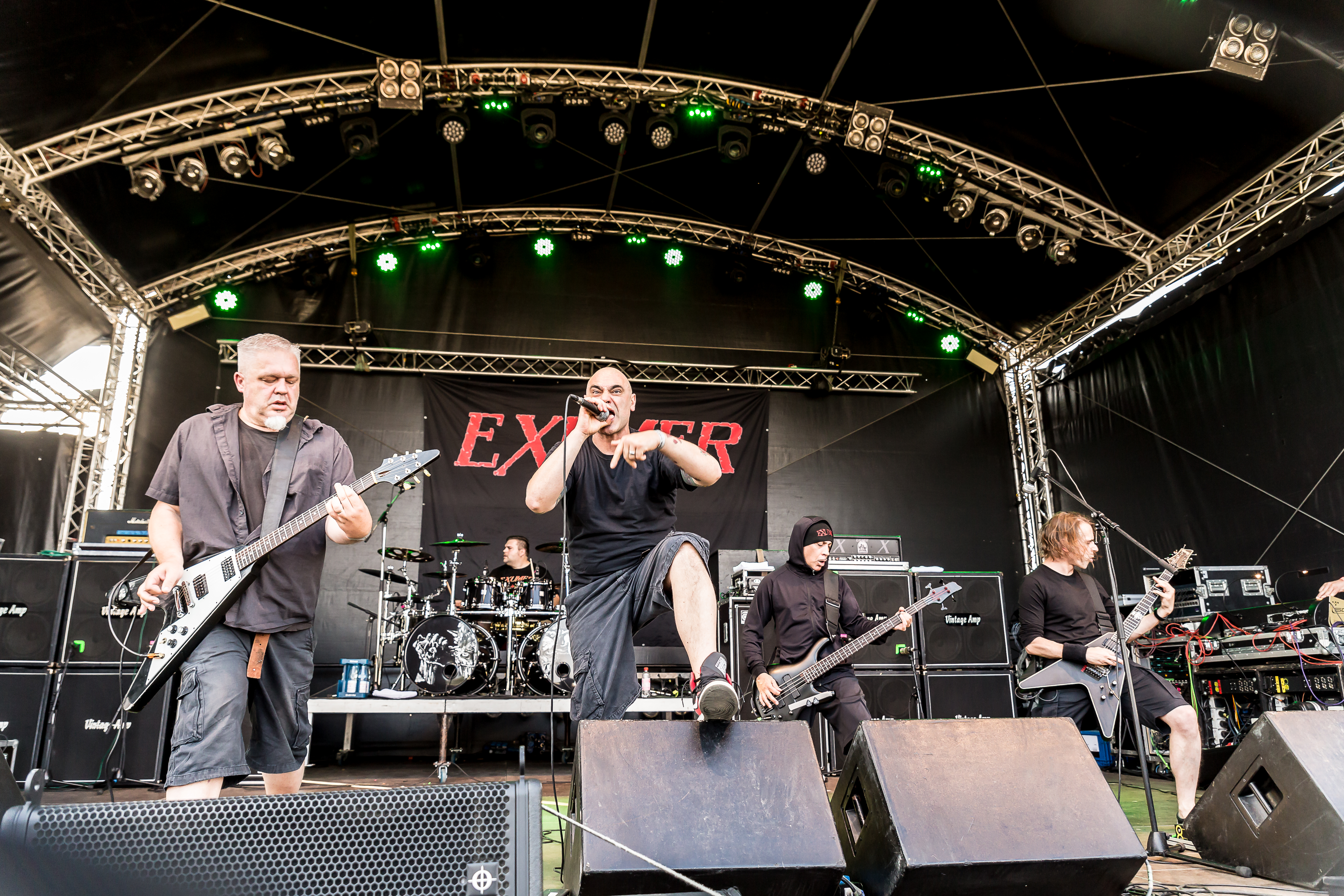
- Exumer in 2019

Background information
- Origin: Wiesbaden, Germany
- Genre: Thrash metal
- Years active: 1985–1991, 2001, 2008–present
- Labels: Disaster, Metal Blade

Exumer is a German thrash metal band formed in Wiesbaden in 1985 by singer/bassist Mem V. Stein and guitarist Ray Mensh. The band broke up in 1991 after two demos and two albums. Exumer appeared for a one-off show at Wacken Open Air in 2001. Stein and Mensh reformed the band in 2008.

== History ==
Their first album, Possessed by Fire (1986), is similar to Angel Dust's Into the Dark Past. Their second album, the following year's Rising from the Sea, is reminiscent of Slayer due Paul Arakari's voice resembling Tom Araya's. Soon after this album, the band broke up. They reformed in 2001 at Wacken Open Air. In 2009, Exumer released the one-track demo Waking the Fire. The band released their third album, Fire & Damnation, in April 2012, followed four years later by their fourth album, The Raging Tides. Their fifth album, Hostile Defiance, was released on 5 April 2019. The band's sixth album, Death Mask Messiah, was released on 28 August 2026.

== Band members ==
Current members

- Mem V. Stein – vocals (1985–1986, 2001, 2008–present), bass (1985–1986, 2001)
- Ray Mensh – guitar (1985–1989, 2008–present)
- Matthias Kassner – drums (2010–present)
- Marc B – guitar (2013–present)
- Alex Voss – bass (2024-present; touring musician 2019–2023)

Former members

- Bernie Siedler – guitar (1985–1989, 2001)
- Syke Bornetto – drums (1985–1989)
- Paul Arakari – vocals, bass (1986–1988), guitar (1985, 2009–2010)
- John Cadden – vocals (1989)
- Franz Pries – bass (1989)
- Bernd Cramer – drums (1989)
- J.P. Rapp – drums (2009–2010)
- H.K. – guitar (2010–2013; died 2014)
- L.O.P. – drums (2001)
- T. Schiavo – bass (2009–2024)

== Discography ==
=== Studio albums ===
- Possessed by Fire (1986)
- Rising from the Sea (1987)
- Fire & Damnation (2012)
- The Raging Tides (2016)
- Hostile Defiance (2019)
- Death Mask Messiah (2026)

=== Demos ===
- A Mortal in Black (1985)
- Whips & Chains (1989)
- Waking the Fire (2009)
