= Slime (band) =

German punk rock band

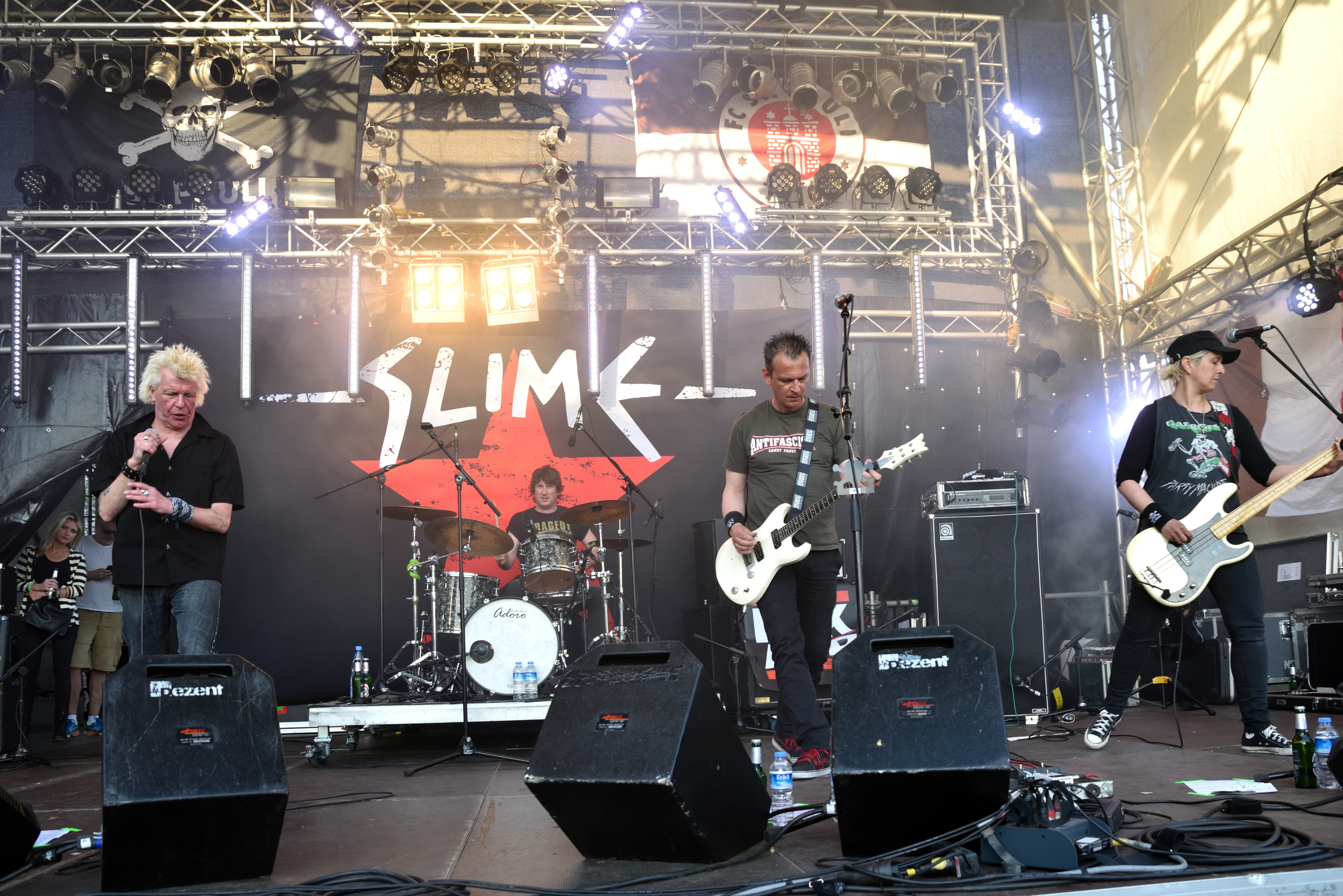
- Slime performing in 2016

Background information
- Origin: Hamburg, Germany
- Years active: 1979–1984, 1990–1994, 2009–present
- Members: Michael "Elf" Mayer; Christian Mevs; Nici; Alex Schwers; Tex Brasket
- Past members: Dirk "Diggen" Jora; Peter "Ball" Wodok; Sven "Eddie" Räther; Ollie; Stephan Mahler; Stephan Larsson
- Website: slime.de

Slime, a German punk rock band founded in Hamburg in 1979, became a defining band in the 1980s German punk scene, and is the most widely recognized example of the musical style Deutschpunk.

== Musical style ==
Although initially playing in the straightforward style of late 70's British punk, Slime developed their own unique style of punk rock, which has been seminal for Deutschpunk. Slime's songs involve complex song structures with layered, sophisticated lyrics, that often include an element of story-telling. The main themes in Slime's music are political resistance to racism, xenophobia, homophobia, and fascism. Their political activism on these topics has strongly influenced the German punk movement in general. The band describes their music as protest songs. In the 1980s they were associated with the anti-nuclear and squatting movements. Their anti-police songs continue to be anthems of leftist political movements, and have translated into slogans that are widely used, for example, in graffiti and stickering campaigns.

Slime is a controversial band in several ways. During the period where they were becoming successful, they were accused of selling out. Some of their lyrics have expressed anti-American sentiment, a popular opinion among students in the '68 generation, because Americans were perceived to have put several prominent Nazi sympathizers back into power (see also Red Army Faction#Background). This attracted criticism from the political left; the song Yankees raus (English translation: Yankees get out) originated in that historical period, and is one they no longer play. A few of their songs have been the subject of legal investigations, most famously the songs Wir wollen keine Bullenschweine (English translation: We don't want any cops/pigs) and Deutschland muss sterben, both released in 1980. "Bullenschweine" was indexed in 2011 and is no longer played, while "Deutschland" was legally classified as protected art in 2000.

== History ==
=== Early years 1979–1984 ===
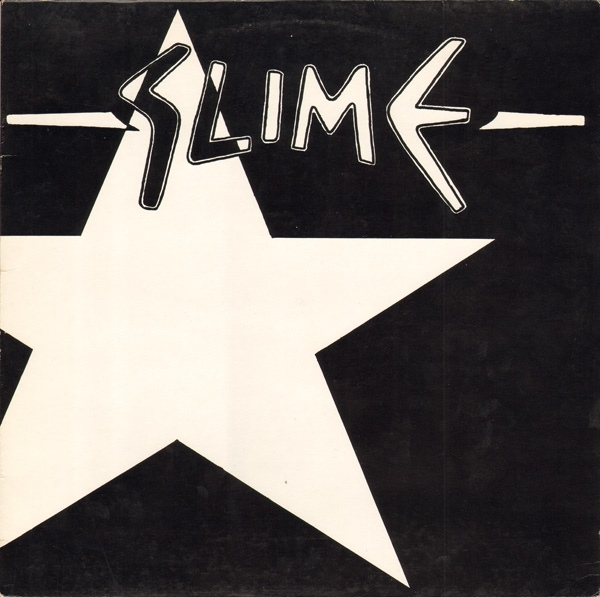
Slime's first album, Slime I (1981)

Michael "Elf" Mayer and Sven "Eddie" Räther both attended high school at the Gymnasium Heidberg in the Hamburg district of Hamburg-Langenhorn. They discovered their love for punk rock through the Ramones' first album and decided to form a band. Mayer played guitar and Räther played bass, and the harbor worker Peter "Ball" Wodok played drums. The band's first vocalist was Thorsten "Scout" Kolle, a friend and classmate of Mayer and Räther. They first performed under the name "Slime 79 and the Sewer Army", although this was soon shortened to "Slime". The first song written by the band was "Polizei SA/SS", which compared the police to the SA and SS, a reaction to the police actions against anti-nuclear protests. Slime's first performance was in the youth center Kiwittsmoor, appearing with the band "The Kreislaufkollaps". The singer for the Kreislaufkollaps, Dirk Jora (artist name "Dicken" and later "Diggen"), was impressive and they asked him to replace Kolle as singer.

Slime's practice room was a former bunker in Hamburg-Eimsbüttel. After Diggen joined the band, the first song that they wrote was Wir wollen keine Bullenschweine. Tom Meyer from Moderne Musik offered to release this song as a single. In fall 1979 Slime recorded four songs for an EP: Bullenschweine, Iran, Hey Punk and Ich hasse. This EP was released in February 1980; only 2,000 LPs were pressed, and they quickly sold out. On February 24, 1980, Slime performed with The Buttocks at the youth prison Neuengamme, which was built on the former land of the concentration camp Neuengamme. They played Polizei SA/SS and Wir wollen keine Bullenschweine, as well as a cover version of Drafi Deutscher's song Marmor, Stein und Eisen bricht. The audience reacted so aggressively that further rock concerts were not allowed at the prison for years. Shortly after this performance Christian Mevs joined the band as a second guitarist.

The band released their first album, Slime I in 1981. The album contained a copy of the song "Wir wollen keine Bullenschweine", which attracted the attention of the Hamburg public prosecutor. Charges for "Volksverhetzung" ("incitement to hatred") were filed and dropped. This album contained the song "A.C.A.B." ("All Cops Are Bastards"), which has become a slogan of leftist political movements. This first album also contained a song against the government They Don't Give a Fuck, as well as the punk anthem Hey Punk.

In 1982, Slime's second album Yankees Raus was released. This album contained well-known songs like Gerechtigkeit (English translation: "Justice"), and Legal-Illegal-Scheißegal (English translation: "Legal-Illegal-It doesn't matter") that the band still performs.

Slime's music and lyrics became darker and more complex by their third album Alle Gegen Alle, released in 1983. Notable songs are Deutschland muss Sterben (...damit wir leben können) (English translation: "Germany must die (... so we can live)"), an allusion to a line of the 1914 poem Soldatenabschied by the German poet Heinrich Lersch: "Deutschland muß leben, und wenn wir sterben müssen" (Germany must live, even if we must die). This album also included classic Slime songs frequently played today Linke Spießer, Störtebeker, and Sand im Getriebe. Following the release of Alle Gegen Alle, Slime broke up and was inactive for several years.

=== Pursuing other projects 1984–1990 ===
Although they had formally broken up, Slime continued to play together in 1992, making several appearances in Hamburg. The members of the band also pursued other projects. Eddi Räther and Michael "Elf" Mayer formed a short-lived band called "Targets" with Stéphane Larsson from The Buttocks.

Stephan Mahler played drums in the Gothic rock band "Mask For" and the group Torpedo Moskau. Mahler and Mevs founded the band Angeschissen together with Jens Rachut. Aside from this, Mevs and Mahler founded the "Soundgarden-Studio“ in Hamburg. Mevs took on the work in the studio, becoming one of the most important producers of albums from the Hamburger Schule; he produced records for Tocotronic, Blumfeld, and Die Sterne, as well as other bands signed to the independent record label L’age d’or.

In 1988, Michael Mayer had joined Destination Zero, a band where Peter Siegler from Razzia was also a member. In 1989 both men became members of the band Abwärts, which had reformed and which continued to be active until 1995. After Slime's reunion in 1994, Mayer continued worked in Abwärts in parallel with Slime.

=== Second Phase 1990–1994 ===
Following German Reunification, neo-fascism was on the rise in Germany (see Hoyerswerda riots, Rostock-Lichtenhagen riots), and many German punk bands responded by writing songs and producing albums. Slime reformed to preduce the album Viva La Muerte in 1992. Their next album, released in 1994, was Schweineherbst (English translation: "Autumn Of Swines"), and is by many seen as their masterpiece, musically as well as lyrically. Dirk Jora has said that the title from this song refers to how the neo-Nazis wanted to burn people in their beds like swine. This album includes the chilling song Der Tod ist ein Meister aus Deutschland (English translation: "Death is a master from Germany"). This song was inspired by the poem Todesfuge (lit. "Death Fugue") by Paul Celan, who was a prisoner in Nazi concentration camps during the Holocaust and described the horrors he had experienced there. After the release of Schweineherbst the band broke up again.

In 1998 Diggen and Elf formed the band C.I.A. (Church of Independent Assholes) to produce the album Codename Freibeuter. C.I.A. released a re-written cover version of Rio Reiser's song König von Deutschland in collaboration with Axel Kurth of the band Wizo and Bela B. of Die Ärzte. After a short tour, this band also broke up.

=== Re-releasing the early albums and Rubberslime 1995–2009 ===
In 2002 and 2003 the record label Weird System re-released Slime's first three albums. The titles that had been censored were re-sung in a way that avoided further prosecution. In 2004 the double DVD "Wenn der Himmel brennt" was released; this DVD had been scheduled to be released in 2003, but had to be postponed because of ongoing legal investigations. The DVD provides a documentary overview of the band history, and includes a 56-page booklet with an interview that discussed the band history and includes a list of releases.

In 2003 the members of Slime began a collaboration with the band Rubbermaids, which they dubbed Rubberslime. The impetus for this collaboration was a concert at the football club FC St. Pauli. They produced a single Viva St. Pauli in 2003, and two albums: First Attack in 2004, and Rock’n’Roll Genossen in 2005.

=== "Sich fügen heißt lügen" Reunion 2009–2020 ===
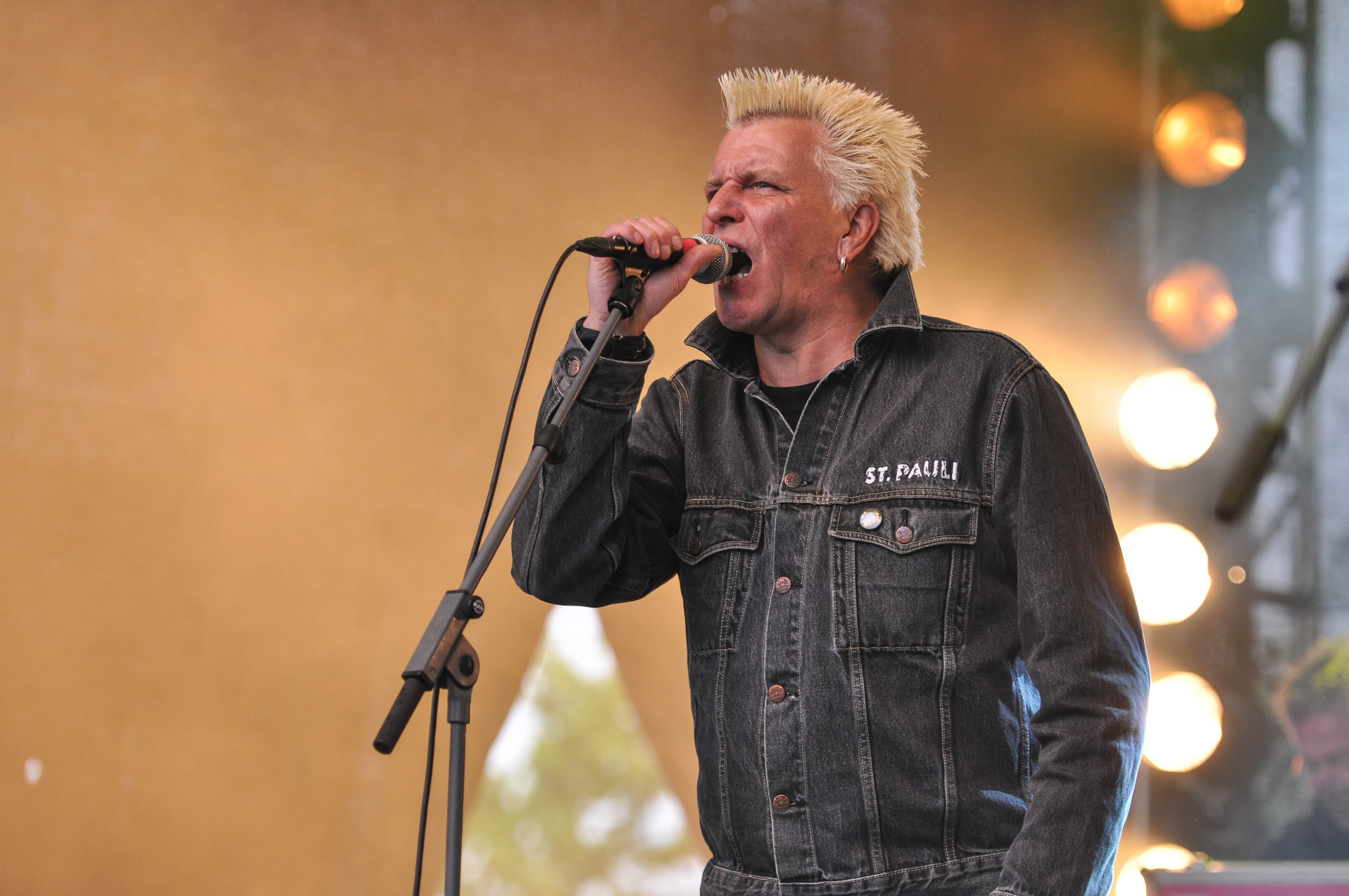
Dirk Jora at Rock in Caputh 2013

Slime reunited in 2009 and released the album Sich fügen heißt lügen (English translation: "To submit is to lie") in 2012. This album centered lyrically on the anarchist and poet Erich Mühsam. It includes the anthems Rebellen and Zum Kampf.

In 2017, Slime released the album Hier und jetzt (English translation: "Here and now"). In one of the songs on this album, Sie wollen wieder schießen dürfen (English translation: "They again want to be allowed to shoot") they take on the extreme right movement and the Alternative for Germany (AfD), who lobbied to be able to shoot immigrants entering Germany. Another song on this album, Banalität Des Bösen, references the work of philosopher Hannah Arendt; this song protests both homophobia and racism.

In 2020, Slime released the album Wem gehört die Angst (English translation: "Who does the fear belong to?"). During this tour, the band broke up due to internal problems. Dirk Jora walked out, announcing publicly that the band had broken up. The rest of Slime announced simultaneously that Jora had stepped back for health reasons. The remainder of their tour was cancelled.

=== The re-formation of Slime with a new singer ===
Slime quickly recruited a new singer, Tex Brasket, with whom they recorded a new album Zwei ("two"), released in 2022. Jora has said that the new band should have selected a new name.

== Discography ==
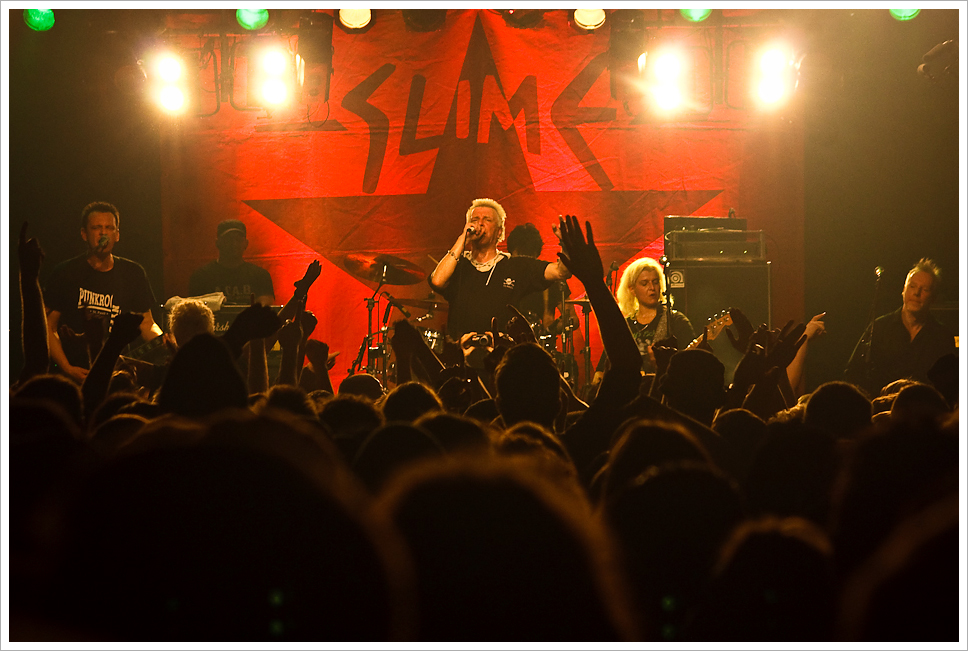
Slime in SO36, 2010

- 1981: Slime I (no label, banned)
- 1982: Yankees raus (Aggressive Rockproduktionen)
- 1983: Alle gegen Alle (Aggressive Rockproduktionen)
- 1992: Viva la Muerte (Aggressive Rockproduktionen/Modern Music)
- 1994: Schweineherbst (Indigo)
- 2012: Sich fügen heißt lügen (People Like You/EMI)
- 2017: Hier und jetzt (People Like You)
- 2020: Wem gehört die Angst (Arising Empire)
- 2022: Zwei (Slime Tonträger, Hulk Räckorz)

=== Live and compilations ===
- 1984: Live (Aggressive Rockproduktionen)
- 1990: Compilation 81–87 (Bitzcore)
- 1990: Die Letzten (Aggressive Rockproduktionen)
- 1995: Live Punk Club (Große Freiheit in Hamburg) (Slime)
- 2012: Rebellen 1979–2012 (with Visions, Juni 2012)
- 2017: Live (with the Box-Set of the album Hier und jetzt)

=== Singles ===
- 1980: "Wir wollen keine Bullenschweine" (Moderne Musik)
- 1993: "Der Tod ist ein Meister aus Deutschland / Schweineherbst" (Weserlabel/Indigo)
- 1993: "10 Kleine Nazischweine" (with Heiter bis Wolkig), two-track-EP
- 2015: Fick das Gesetz (7″, Aggressive Punk Produktionen)
- 2016: Sie wollen wieder schießen (dürfen) (7″, People Like You Records)
- 2017: Unsere Lieder (7″, People Like You Records)
- 2018: Patrioten/Hallo Hoffnung (split-7″ with ZSK, People Like You Records)

=== Tribute album ===
- 2009: Alle gegen Alle – A Tribute to Slime (Toten Hosen, Rasta Knast, Dritte Wahl, etc.)

=== Video ===
- 1994: Schweineherbst (VHS, Indigo)
- 2004: Wenn der Himmel brennt
- 2023: DIGGEN! Das Leben von Dirk Jora zwischen Fußball, Anarchie und Punk documentary released in chapters on the Missglückte Welt YouTube Kanal.

== Literature ==
- Daniel Ryser (2013), Slime – Deutschland muss sterben (2. ed.), München: Wilhelm Heyne Verlag, ISBN 978-3-453-67653-4

== Members ==
=== Members (2016) ===
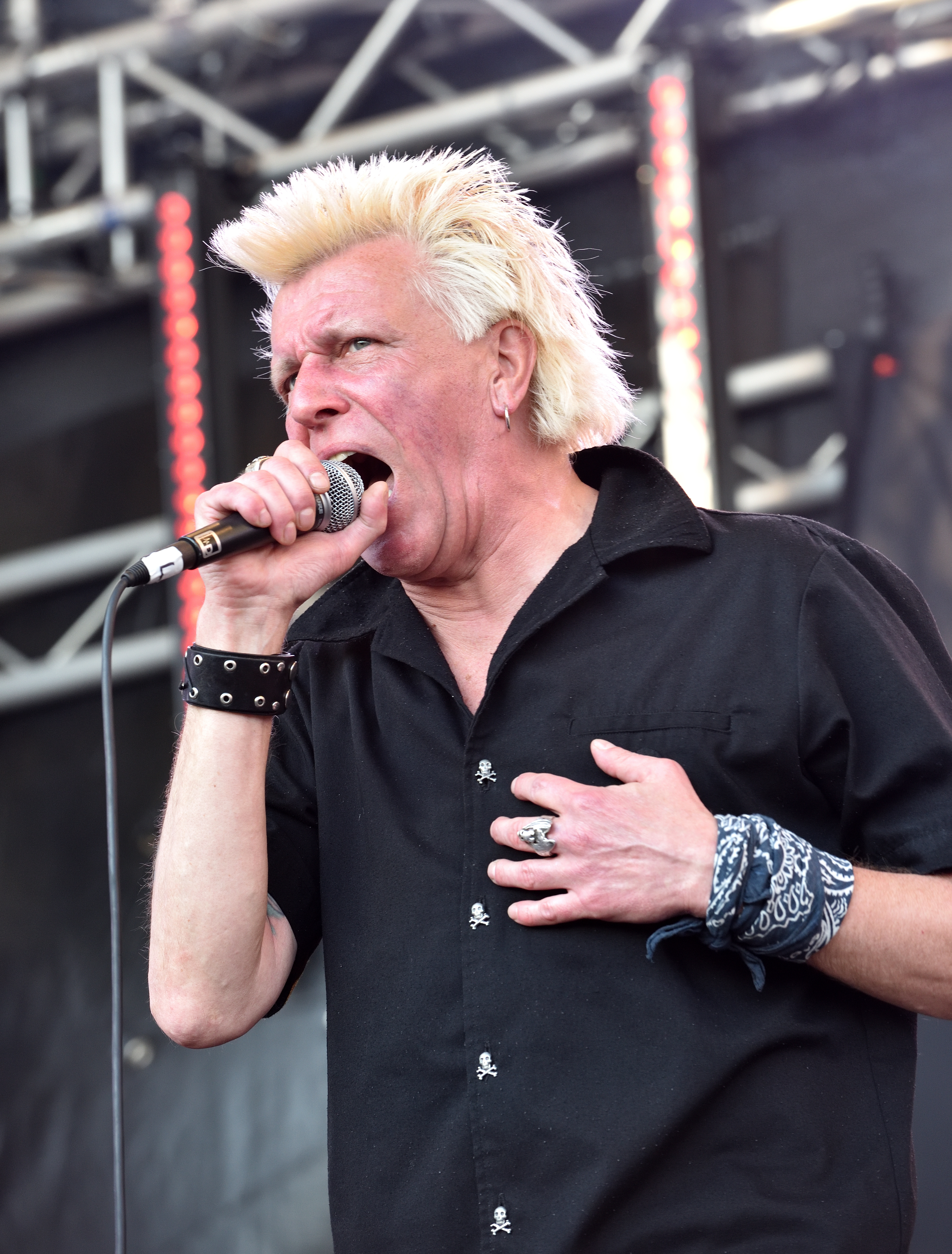
Dirk "Diggen" Jora

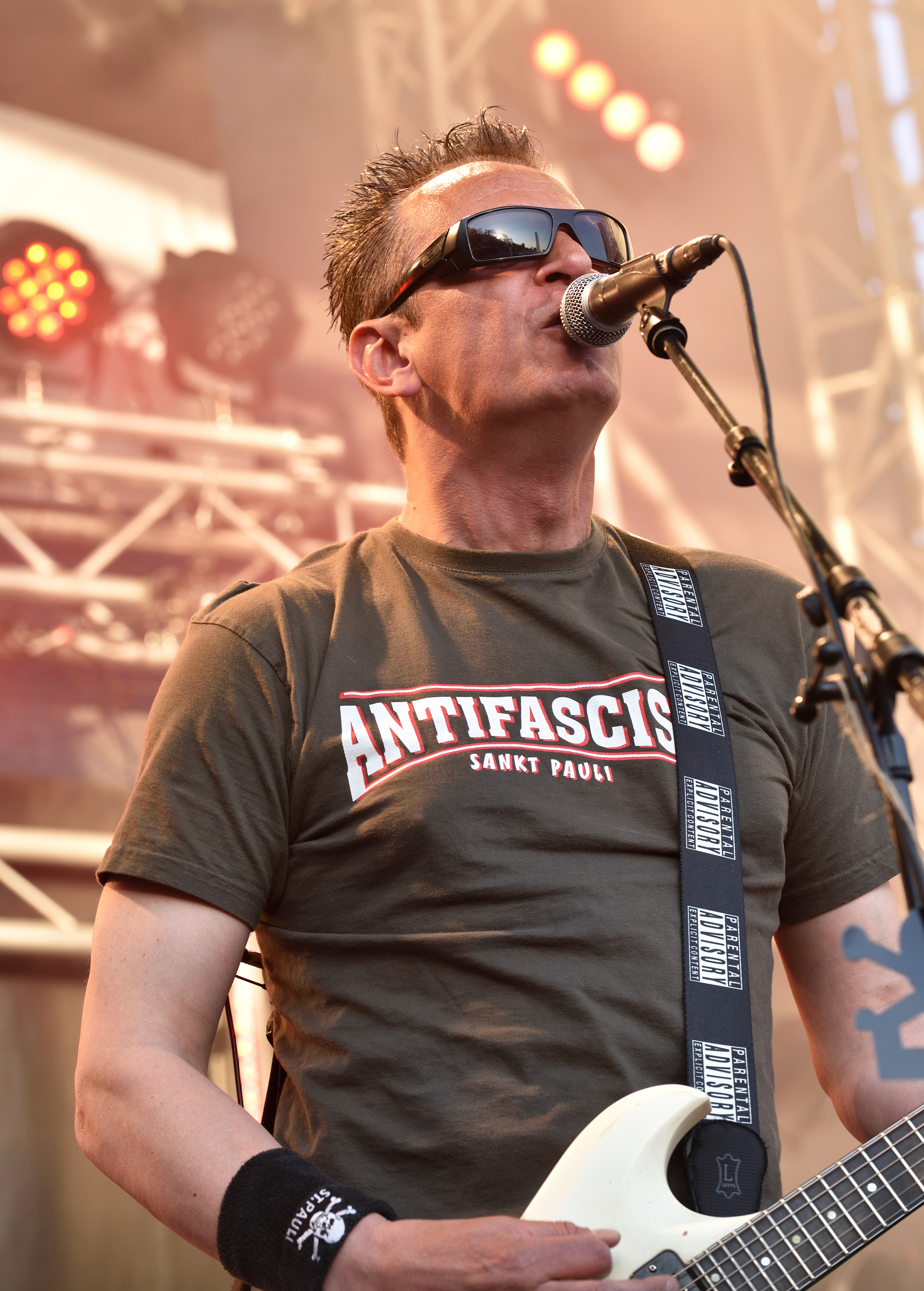
Michael "Elf“ Mayer

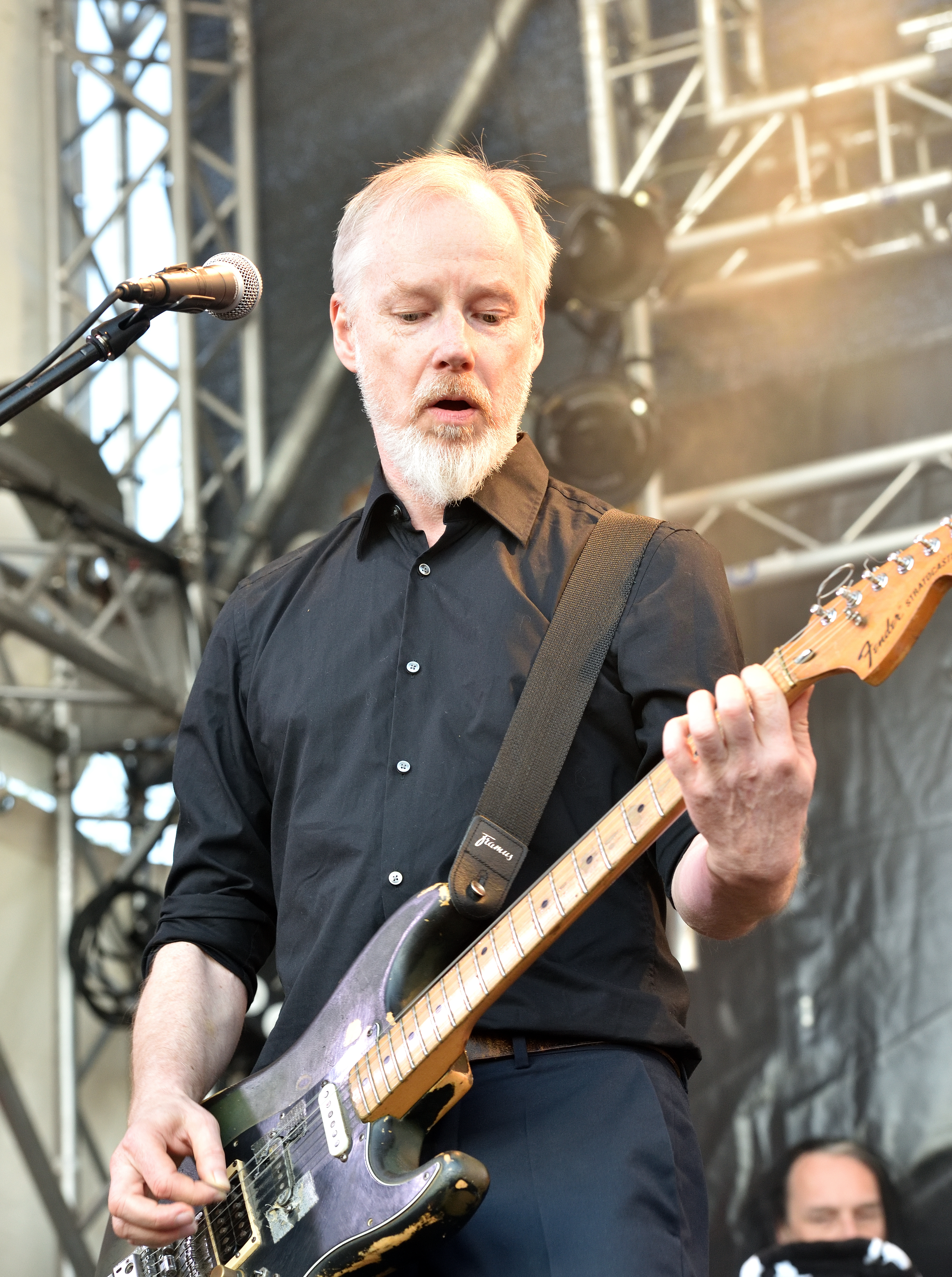
Christian Mevs

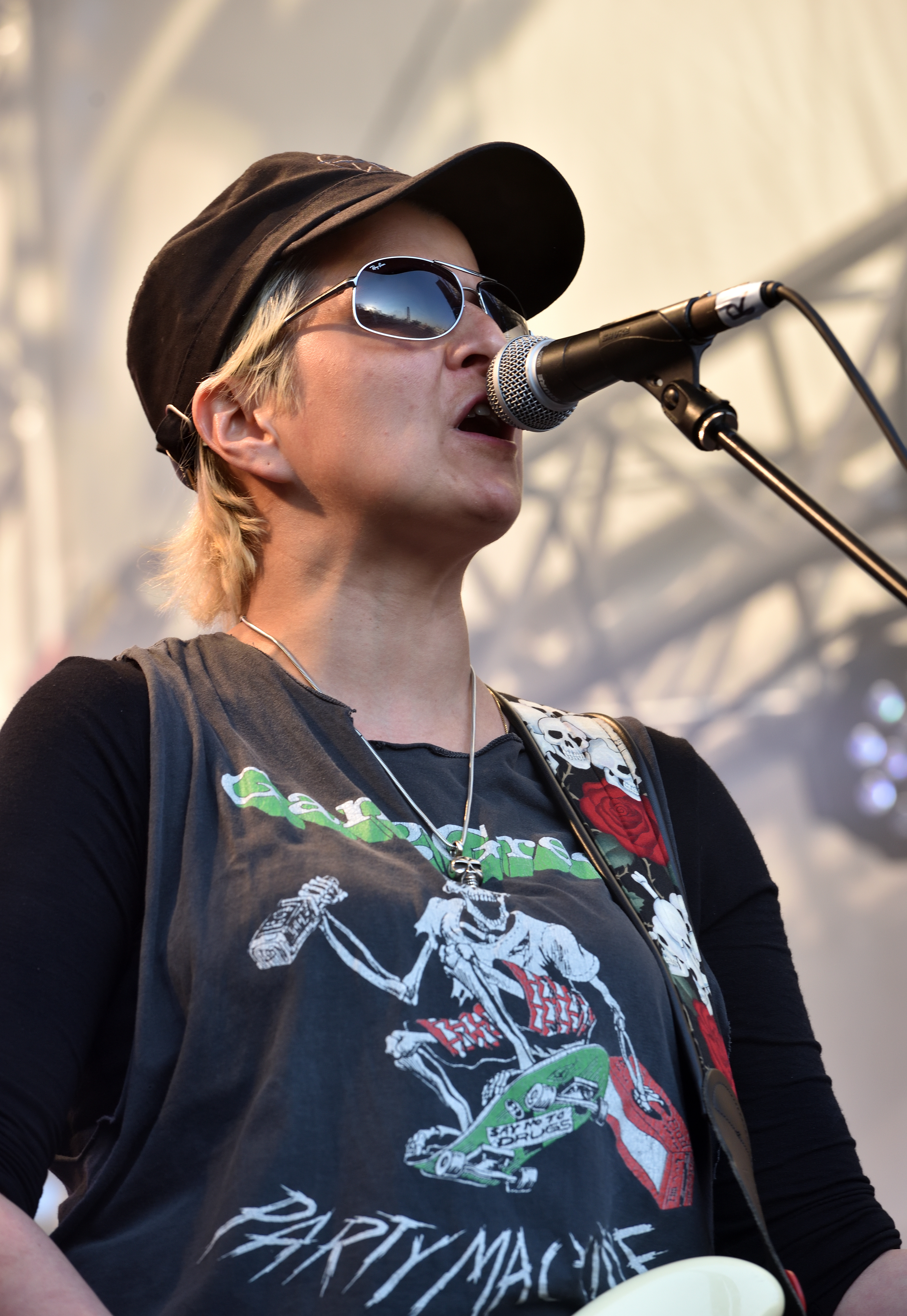
Nici

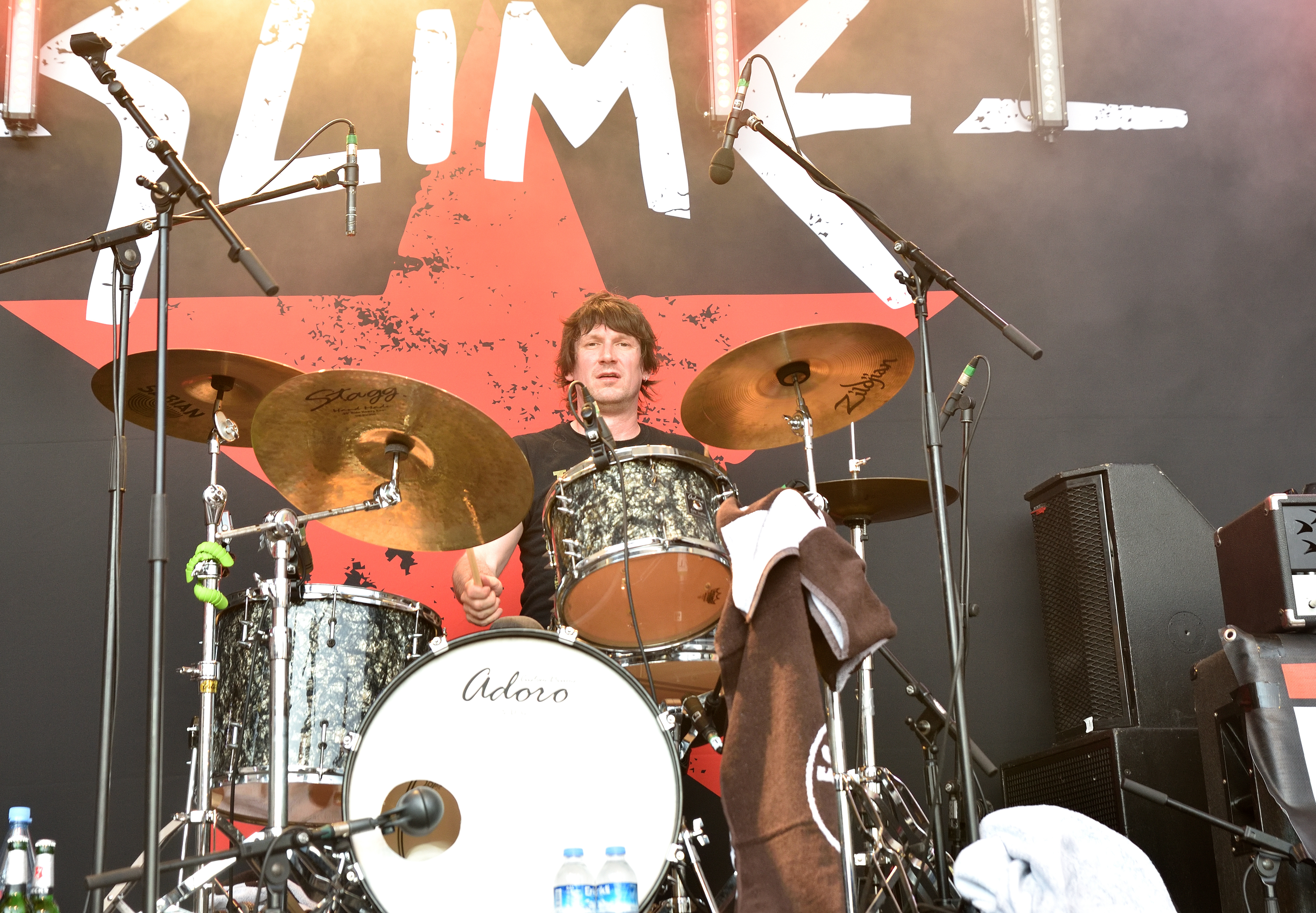
Alex Schwers
