= Them Not Me =

EP by Destruction
- Released: 9 June 1995
- Genre: Groove metal
- Length: 19:36
- Label: Brain Butcher

Destruction chronology
| Destruction EP (1994) | Them Not Me (1995) | The Least Successful Human Cannonball (1998) |

Them Not Me is an EP by the German thrash metal band Destruction. The period without original vocalist Marcel "Schmier" Schirmer is often called "Neo-Destruction". They released three albums with Thomas Rosenmerkel on vocals: Destruction, Them Not Me and The Least Successful Human Cannonball, although the band does not consider these albums part of their official discography.

== Reception ==
The EP was given poor reviews on many heavy metal websites. Many reviewers mentioned that the production quality of the EP was far superior to its musical quality. The final track, "Mentally Handicapped Enterprise", was reviewed as the best song of the EP. Many reviewers saw this album as the lowest point in the career of Destruction.

== Track listing ==
| No. | Title | Length |
|---|---|---|
| 1. | "Scratch the Skin" | 3:39 |
| 2. | "Live to Start Again" | 3:04 |
| 3. | "Bright Side of Leprocy" | 4:01 |
| 4. | "Push Me Off the Windowsill" | 4:05 |
| 5. | "Mole" | 0:41 |
| 6. | "Mentally Handicapped Enterprise" | 4:06 |
| Total length: | | 19:36 |

== Personnel ==
- Thomas Rosenmerkel – vocals
- Michael Piranio – lead guitar
- Mike Sifringer – rhythm guitar
- Christian Engler – bass
- Olly Kaiser – drums
