= 2017 in heavy metal music =

This is a timeline documenting the events of heavy metal in the year 2017.

== Bands formed ==
- Bad Wolves
- The Dark Element
- End
- Idle Hands
- Lowen
- Paleface Swiss
- Powerflo
- Silvertomb
- Sons of Apollo

== Bands disbanded ==
- Amoral
- Black Sabbath
- Dark Sermon
- The Dillinger Escape Plan
- Hail of Bullets
- HIM
- In Dying Arms
- Letlive
- Marionette
- Negură Bunget
- Poured Out
- Soundgarden
- Spawn of Possession
- Textures
- Those Who Fear
- Trap Them
- Vanna
- Xerath
- Your Memorial

== Bands reformed ==
- As I Lay Dying
- Big Dumb Face
- Carnivore A.D.
- Chimaira (one-off show)
- Clown Core
- Eighteen Visions
- Exhorder
- Heavy Load
- Light This City
- Lionheart
- Nachtmystium
- Sadus
- Vengeance Rising (one-off show)

== Events ==
- On February 2 and 4, Black Sabbath played their final two shows at the Genting Arena in Birmingham. These dates were the final two dates of the band's farewell tour The End.
- On May 4, 2017, Overkill announced that Jason Bittner replaced Ron Lipnicki as the drummer for the band.
- Aerosmith embarked on what may be their final tour after 47 years together, titled the Aero-Vederci Baby! tour.
- Canadian festival Heavy Montreal took year off, returning in July 2018.
- Vio-lence singer Sean Killian was diagnosed with stage four liver cirrhosis.

== Deaths ==
- January 28 – Geoff Nicholls, former keyboardist of Black Sabbath and Quartz, died from lung cancer at the age of 68.
- January 31 – John Wetton, former bassist of Uriah Heep died from cancer at the age of 67.
- February 8 – Tony "It" Särkkä, former vocalist and multi-instrumentalist of Abruptum and Ophtalamia, died from undisclosed reasons at the age of 44.
- February 11 – Trish Doan, bassist of Kittie, died from undisclosed reasons at the age of 31.
- February 25 – Rick Chavez, guitarist of Drive, died from internal bleeding.
- March 12 – Joey Alves, former guitarist of Y&T, died from ulcerative colitis at the age of 63.
- March 21 – Gabriel "Negru" Mafa, drummer of Negură Bunget, died from a heart attack at the age of 42.
- April 5 – Paul O'Neill, guitarist, founder, and producer of Trans-Siberian Orchestra and former producer of Dio, Metal Church, and Savatage, died from an intoxication of various prescription medication at the age of 61.
- April 12 – Keni Richards, former drummer of Autograph, died from undisclosed reasons at the age of 60.
- April 12 – Tom Coyne, Grammy Award-winning mastering engineer of numerous artists in multiple genres, including Overkill, Metallica, Testament, Mercyful Fate, and Nuclear Assault, among others, died from multiple myeloma at the age of 62.
- April 15 – Matt Holt, vocalist of Nothingface, died from a degenerative illness at the age of 39.
- April 27 – Jeff Decker, former guitarist of Thor, died from a heart attack.
- May 17 – Chris Cornell, vocalist and guitarist of Soundgarden, died from suicide by hanging himself at the age of 52.
- May 20 – Ace Still, former vocalist of Goatlord, died from a heart attack and severe head trauma.
- May 27 – Guillermo Sánchez, bassist of Rata Blanca, died from sepsis.
- June 13 – Masami Tohda, former guitarist of Tokyo Yankees died from undisclosed reasons at the age of 49.
- June 28 – Nic Ritter, former drummer of Warbringer, died from undisclosed reasons at the age of 37.
- July 4 – Chris Ross, former vocalist of Vital Remains, died from multiple gunshot wounds at the age of 40.
- July 12 – Marc "Blaash" Michaelson, drummer of Bahimiron, died from undisclosed reasons.
- July 14 – David Zablidowsky, bassist of Adrenaline Mob and Trans-Siberian Orchestra, died in a tour bus accident.
- July 20 – Chester Bennington, vocalist of Linkin Park, died from suicide by hanging himself at the age of 41.
- August 16 – Jason Corsaro, recording engineer of numerous artists in multiple genres, including Motörhead, Deep Purple, Danzig, Soundgarden and Corrosion of Conformity, died from undisclosed reasons at the age of 58.
- September 14 – Stig Börje "Boss" Forsberg, owner of Black Mark Production, father of Quorthon, and record producer and engineer of numerous artists, including Bathory, Lake of Tears, Nightingale, and Edge of Sanity, died from undisclosed reasons at the age of 73.
- September 22 – Eric Eycke, former vocalist of Corrosion of Conformity, died from undisclosed reasons.
- October 3 – Rainer Hänsel, record engineer and tour promoter for numerous artists, including Saxon, Manowar, Motörhead, Sodom, and Destruction, died from undisclosed reasons at the age of 63.
- October 5 – Rodrigo Bvevino, former vocalist of Avenger, died from lung cancer at the age of 42.
- October 21 – Martin Eric Ain, former bassist and vocalist of Celtic Frost and Hellhammer, died from a heart attack at the age of 50.
- October 22 – Daisy Berkowitz, former guitarist of Marilyn Manson, died from colon cancer at the age of 49.
- October 28 – Bruce Black, former drummer of Meliah Rage, died from undisclosed reasons.
- October 28 – Daichi Shimoda, vocalist of Victim of Deception, died from undisclosed reasons.
- November 1 – Scott Wily, former vocalist of Vital Remains, died from undisclosed reasons at the age of 41.
- November 5 – Danny Anaya, former drummer of MX Machine and Abattoir, died from cancer at the age of 52.
- November 7 – Whitey Glan, former drummer of Alice Cooper, died from lung cancer at the age of 71.
- November 9 – Chuck Mosley, former vocalist of Faith No More, died from undisclosed reasons at the age of 57.
- November 12 – Chad Hanks, bassist of American Head Charge, died from kidney and liver failure at the age of 46.
- November 16 – Marco De Rosa, also known as "M." or "M The Bard", former vocalist of Opera IX, died from undisclosed reasons at the age of 43.
- December 13 – Warrel Dane, vocalist of Sanctuary and former vocalist of Nevermore, died from a heart attack at the age of 56.
- December 25 – Nao, former vocalist of United, died of cancer at the age of 56.

== Albums released ==
=== January ===
Day	Artist	Album
6	Halestorm	Reanimate 3.0: The Covers EP (EP)
9	Laster	Ons Vrije Fatum
13	Black Anvil	As Was
13	Code Orange	Forever
13	Gotthard	Silver
13	Grave Digger	Healed by Metal
13	Pain of Salvation	In the Passing Light of Day
13	Sepultura	Machine Messiah
13	Wolfchant	Bloodwinter
20	Firewind	Immortals
20	Helheim	LandawarijaR
20	Palisades	Palisades
25	Aborym	Shifting.negative
27	Beheaded	Beast Incarnate
27	Betraying the Martyrs	The Resilient
27	Chrome Molly	Hoodoo Voodoo
27	Code	Lost Signal (EP)
27	Hour of Penance	Cast the First Stone
27	Jack Russell's Great White	He Saw It Comin'
27	Kreator	Gods of Violence
27	Krokus	Big Rocks (covers album)
27	The Murder of My Sweet	Echoes of the Aftermath
27	Stephen Pearcy	Smash
27	Xandria	Theater of Dimensions

=== February ===
Day	Artist	Album
2	De Magia Veterum	Naked Swords into the Womb of the Enemy
3	Iron Reagan	Crossover Ministry
3	Soen	Lykaia
10	Deivos	Endemic Divine
10	First Blood	Rules
10	Mors Principium Est	Embers of a Dying World
10	Mutiny Within	Origins
10	Nidingr	The High Heat Licks Against Heaven
10	Overkill	The Grinding Wheel
10	Thunder	Rip It Up
17	Battle Beast	Bringer of Pain
17	Benighted	Necrobreed
17	Crystal Viper	Queen of the Witches
17	Once Human	Evolution
17	Edenbridge	The Great Momentum
17	Ithilien	Shaping the Soul
17	Lorna Shore	Flesh Coffin
17	Stinking Lizaveta	Journey to the Underworld
24	A Breach of Silence	Secrets
24	Bloodbound	War of Dragons
24	Born of Osiris	The Eternal Reign (EP)
24	Ex Deo	The Immortal Wars
24	Hetroertzen	Uprising of the Fallen
24	Immolation	Atonement
24	Persefone	Aathma
24	Pyogenesis	A Kingdom to Disappear
24	Sanctuary	Inception
24	Sinister	Syncretism
24	Six Feet Under	Torment
24	Suicide Silence	Suicide Silence
24	Trollfest	Helluva
24	Unearthly Trance	Stalking the Ghost
24	Vendetta	The 5th
25	Ancestry (MX)	Transitions

=== March ===
Day	Artist	Album
1	The Moniac Sound Maker	Professional Self-Destruction
3	Blaze Bayley	Endure and Survive
3	Emmure	Look at Yourself
3	John 5 and the Creatures	Season of the Witch
3	Majesty	Rebels
3	Within the Ruins	Halfway Human
7	Cirith Gorgor	Bi Den Dode Hant (EP)
10	Black Map	In Droves
10	Cellador	Off the Grid
10	Darkest Hour	Godless Prophets & the Migrant Flora
10	Dunderbeist	Twilja (EP)
10	Edge of Paradise	Alive (EP)
10	Evocation	The Shadow Archetype
10	Fen	Winter
10	Havok	Conformicide
10	Hydrogyn	Redemption
10	Lock Up	Demonization
10	Nick Douglas	Regenerations
10	Planning for Burial	Below the House
15	Demonic Resurrection	Dashavatar
17	The Charm The Fury	The Sick, Dumb & Happy
17	Dead Neanderthals	Craters
17	Fit for an Autopsy	The Great Collapse
17	King of Asgard	Tauder (EP)
17	Obituary	Obituary
17	The Raven Age	Darkness Will Rise
17	Righteous Vendetta	Cursed
17	Saille	Gnosis
17	Vangough	Warpaint
17	Woe	Hope Attrition
23	Northlane	Mesmer
24	Art of Anarchy	The Madness
24	Arvas	Black Path
24	Bonfire	Byte the Bullet
24	Brother Firetribe	Sunbound
24	Brutality Will Prevail	In Dark Places
24	House of Lords	Saint of the Lost Souls
24	Night Ranger	Don't Let Up
24	Pallbearer	Heartless
24	Steel Panther	Lower the Bar
31	Arch Enemy	As the Stages Burn! (live album)
31	Body Count	Bloodlust
31	Demon Hunter	Outlive
31	Invidia	As the Sun Sleeps
31	Jasta	The Lost Chapters
31	Mantar	The Spell (EP)
31	Mastodon	Emperor of Sand
31	The Moth Gatherer	The Comfortable Low (EP)
31	Nightrage	The Venomous
31	Sinner	Tequila Suicide
31	Warbringer	Woe to the Vanquished

=== April ===
Day	Artist	Album
7	Azarath	In Extremis
7	Dead by April	Worlds Collide
7	Deep Purple	Infinite
7	Deez Nuts	Binge & Purgatory
7	Falling in Reverse	Coming Home
7	Jesters of Destiny	The Sorrows That Refuse to Drown
7	The Obsessed	Sacred
7	Ulver	The Assassination of Julius Caesar
14	Blood Feast	The Future State of Wicked
14	Corroded	Defcon Zero
14	The Dead Rabbitts	This Emptiness
14	Dimmu Borgir	Forces of the Northern Night (live album)
14	Enterprise Earth	Embodiment
14	Infernäl Mäjesty	No God
14	Necrowretch	Satanic Slavery
14	Novembers Doom	Hamartia
14	Oranssi Pazuzu	Kevät/Värimyrsky (EP)
14	Richie Kotzen	Salting Earth
21	Axel Rudi Pell	The Ballads V (compilation album)
21	Crazy Lixx	Ruff Justice
21	Disbelief	The Symbol of Death
21	Ghost Bath	Starmourner
21	Heiress	Restless Aim
21	Incubus	8
21	Jotnar	Connected/Condemned
21	Labyrinth	Architecture of a God
21	Les Discrets	Prédateurs
21	Night Demon	Darkness Remains
21	Nothing Left	Destroy and Rebuild (EP)
21	Uneven Structure	La Partition
21	While She Sleeps	You Are We
21	With Our Arms to the Sun	Orenda
21	Your Chance to Die	Ex Nihilo
28	A Killer's Confession	Unbroken
28	All That Remains	Madness
28	Artificial Language	The Observer
28	Astral Doors	Black Eyed Children
28	Ayreon	The Source
28	Barathrum	Fanatiko
28	Firespawn	The Reprobate
28	He Is Legend	Few
28	Life of Agony	A Place Where There's No More Pain
28	Mindmaze	Resolve
28	Noumena	Myrrys
28	Pyramaze	Contingent
28	Skyclad	Forward into the Past
28	Stahlmann	Bastard
28	Terror	The Walls Will Fall (EP)

=== May ===
Day	Artist	Album
5	Eisregen	Fleischfilm
5	Full of Hell	Trumpeting Ecstasy
5	God Dethroned	The World Ablaze
5	Hate	Tremendum
5	Motionless in White	Graveyard Shift
5	Seven Kingdoms	Decennium
5	Spoil Engine	Stormsleeper
5	The Sword	Greetings From... (live album)
8	Nokturnal Mortum	Істина
10	Aldious	Unlimited Diffusion
10	Holy Blood	Glory to the Heroes (EP)
10	Mark Slaughter	Halfway There
12	Ajattara	Lupaus
12	Harem Scarem	United
12	Gideon	Cold
12	Kobra and the Lotus	Prevail I
12	Sacred Oath	Twelve Bells
12	Seether	Poison the Parish
12	Voyager	Ghost Mile
12	Warrant	Louder Harder Faster
16	Nargaroth	Era of Threnody
19	3Teeth	<shutdown.exe>
19	DragonForce	Reaching into Infinity
19	Linkin Park	One More Light
19	Oceano	Revelation
19	Papa Roach	Crooked Teeth
19	Rock Goddess	It's More Than Rock and Roll (EP)
19	Scale the Summit	In a World of Fear
26	Alestorm	No Grave But the Sea
26	Avatarium	Hurricanes and Halos
26	Danzig	Black Laden Crown
26	Divinity	The Immortalist
26	Dream Evil	Six
26	In Hearts Wake	Ark
26	The Letter Black	Pain
26	Nocte Obducta	Totholz (Ein Raunen aus dem Klammwald)
26	Rhapsody of Fire	Legendary Years (compilation album)
26	Sólstafir	Berdreyminn
31	Naer Mataron	Lucitherion: Temple of the Radiant Sun

=== June ===
Day	Artist	Album
2	Adrenaline Mob	We the People
2	DGM	Passing Stages (live album)
2	Doyle	Doyle II: As We Die
2	Eighteen Visions	XVIII
2	Elder	Reflections of a Floating World
2	Gravetemple	Impassable Fears
2	Great White	Full Circle
2	Jorn	Life on Death Road
2	Miss May I	Shadows Inside
2	The One Hundred	Chaos + Bliss
2	Phobia	Lifeless God
2	Secret Sphere	The Nature of Time
2	Sikth	The Future in Whose Eyes?
2	Tankard	One Foot in the Grave
2	Tengger Cavalry	Die on My Ride
2	Unleash the Archers	Apex
2	Vallenfyre	Fear Those Who Fear Him
2	Wednesday 13	Condolences
9	Anathema	The Optimist
9	Dawn of Ashes	Daemonolatry Gnosis
9	Suffocation	...Of the Dark Light
9	Svartsyn	In Death
9	Volumes	Different Animals
9	White Skull	Will of the Strong
16	Carach Angren	Dance and Laugh Amongst the Rotten
16	Chon	Homey
16	CKY	The Phoenix
16	Dead Head	Swine Plague
16	Iced Earth	Incorruptible
16	Nickelback	Feed the Machine
16	Tombs	The Grand Annihilation
16	Wizard	Fallen Kings
23	311	Mosaic
23	Bison	You Are Not the Ocean You Are the Patient
23	Broken Hope	Mutilated and Assimilated
23	Conveyer	No Future
23	Desultory	Through Aching Aeons
23	Dying Fetus	Wrong One to Fuck With
23	Goatwhore	Vengeful Ascension
23	Jyrki 69	Helsinki Vampire
23	KMFDM	Yeah! (EP)
23	Municipal Waste	Slime and Punishment
23	Powerflo	Powerflo
23	Tarja	An Empty Dream (EP)
23	The White Noise	AM/PM
30	The Acacia Strain	Gravebloom
30	Origin	Unparalleled Universe
30	Shade Empire	Poetry of the Ill-Minded
30	Stone Sour	Hydrograd
30	Sworn In	All Smiles
30	Vintersorg	Till Fjälls, Del II

=== July ===
Day	Artist	Album
7	Aborted	Bathos (EP)
7	Decapitated	Anticult
7	Esprit D'Air	Constellations
7	M.O.D.	Busted, Broke & American
7	Melvins	A Walk with Love & Death
7	Mr. Big	Defying Gravity
7	Orden Ogan	Gunmen
13	Ewigkeit	Cosmic Man
14	12 Stones	Picture Perfect
14	Bloody Hammers	The Horrific Case of Bloody Hammers (EP)
14	Boris	Dear
14	Dayseeker	Dreaming Is Sinking /// Waking Is Rising
14	Edguy	Monuments (compilation album)
14	Integrity	Howling, for the Nightmare Shall Consume
14	Kissin’ Dynamite	Generation Goodbye – Dynamite Nights (live album)
21	Decrepit Birth	Axis Mundi
21	Ded	Mis•an•thrope
21	In This Moment	Ritual
21	The Kindred	Weight (EP)
21	Klingenberg Syndrome	Whiskey Tango Foxtrot
21	Nine Inch Nails	Add Violence (EP)
21	Pathology	Pathology
21	Projected	Ignite My Insanity
21	Shattered Sun	The Evolution of Anger
21	To Speak of Wolves	Dead in the Shadow
21	Wintersun	The Forest Seasons
26	Adagio	Life
28	Alice Cooper	Paranormal
28	Byzantine	The Cicada Tree
28	Callejon	Fandigo
28	Make Them Suffer	Worlds Apart
28	Masterplan	PumpKings (covers album)
28	The Midnight Ghost Train	Cypress Ave.
28	Oceans Ate Alaska	Hikari
28	Prong	Zero Days
28	Rage	Seasons of the Black
28	Rex Brown	Smoke on This...
28	Rings of Saturn	Ultu Ulla
28	Shadowside	Shades of Humanity
28	Transport League	Twist and Shout at the Devil
31	Thunderstick	Something Wicked This Way Comes

=== August ===
Day	Artist	Album
4	Accept	The Rise of Chaos
4	Dale Crover	The Fickle Finger of Fate
4	Dead Cross	Dead Cross
4	Deep Purple	Johnny's Band (EP)
4	Marty Friedman	Wall of Sound
4	Quiet Riot	Road Rage
4	Russkaja	Kosmopoliturbo
4	Thor	Beyond the Pain Barrier
4	Toxik	Breaking Class (EP)
4	Wage War	Deadweight
11	All Out War	Give Us Extinction
11	Cormorant	Diaspora
11	Hinder	The Reign
11	Incantation	Profane Nexus
11	Motograter	Desolation
11	Necrophobic	Pesta (EP)
11	Venom Inc.	Avé
18	End of Green	Void Estate
18	Eluveitie	Evocation II – Pantheon
18	Janet Gardner	Janet Gardner
18	KMFDM	Hell Yeah
18	Thy Art Is Murder	Dear Desolation
25	Akercocke	Renaissance in Extremis
25	Brendon Small	Brendon Small's Galaktikon II: Become the Storm
25	Dagoba	Black Nova
25	Die Apokalyptischen Reiter	Der Rote Reiter
25	Eskimo Callboy	The Scene
25	The Haunted	Strength in Numbers
25	Korpiklaani	Live at Masters of Rock (live album)
25	Lacrimosa	Testimonium
25	Leng Tch'e	Razorgrind
25	Leprous	Malina
25	Lionheart	Second Nature
25	Sannhet	So Numb
25	Queens of the Stone Age	Villains

=== September ===
Day	Artist	Album
1	Anubis Gate	Covered in Black
1	Botanist	Collective: The Shape of He to Come
1	Epica	The Solace System (EP)
1	Motörhead	Under Cöver (covers album)
1	Paradise Lost	Medusa
1	Rosetta	Utopioid
1	Septicflesh	Codex Omega
1	Subterranean Masquerade	Vagabond
8	Arch Enemy	Will to Power
8	Cannabis Corpse	Left Hand Pass
8	Lionize	Nuclear Soul
8	Living Colour	Shade
8	Lynch Mob	The Brotherhood
8	Stray from the Path	Only Death Is Real
8	Threshold	Legends of the Shires
13	Galneryus	Ultimate Sacrifice
15	Belphegor	Totenritual
15	Caligula's Horse	In Contact
15	The Contortionist	Clairvoyant
15	Cripper	Follow Me: Kill!
15	Ensiferum	Two Paths
15	Fleshkiller	Awaken
15	A Hill to Die Upon	Via Artis Via Mortis
15	Myrkur	Mareridt
15	Nothing More	The Stories We Tell Ourselves
15	Prophets of Rage	Prophets of Rage
15	Soil	Scream: The Essentials
15	Vattnet	Vattnet
22	Archspire	Relentless Mutation
22	Chelsea Wolfe	Hiss Spun
22	Counterparts	You're Not You Anymore
22	Cradle of Filth	Cryptoriana – The Seductiveness of Decay
22	Devilish Impressions	The I
22	Diablo Blvd	Zero Hour
22	Enter Shikari	The Spark
22	Kauan	Kaiho
22	King Parrot	Ugly Produce
22	Mastodon	Cold Dark Place (EP)
22	Matt Cameron	Cavedweller
22	Monarch	Never Forever
22	Otherwise	Sleeping Lions
22	Satyricon	Deep Calleth Upon Deep
22	Sons of Texas	Forged in Fortitude
22	Ufomammut	8
22	With the Dead	Love from With the Dead
22	Wolves in the Throne Room	Thrice Woven
29	5 Star Grave	The Red Room
29	36 Crazyfists	Lanterns
29	Arckanum	Den Förstfödde
29	Act of Defiance	Old Scars, New Wounds
29	Emil Bulls	Kill Your Demons
29	Jag Panzer	The Deviant Chord
29	Kublai Khan	Nomad
29	Loincloth	Psalm of the Morbid Whore
29	Nocturnal Rites	Phoenix
29	Primus	The Desaturating Seven
29	Propagandhi	Victory Lap
29	Tetrarch	Freak
29	UFO	The Salentino Cuts (covers album)
29	Unsane	Sterilize

=== October ===
Day	Artist	Album
6	Angel Vivaldi	Synapse
6	August Burns Red	Phantom Anthem
6	Autograph	Get Off Your Ass
6	The Black Dahlia Murder	Nightbringers
6	Ctulu	Cultus in Tenebris (EP)
6	The Darkness	Pinewood Smile
6	Fireball Ministry	Remember the Story
6	Haemorrhage	We Are the Gore
6	Lunatic Soul	Fractured
6	Marilyn Manson	Heaven Upside Down
6	My Ticket Home	UnReal
6	The Ongoing Concept	Places
11	Coldrain	Fateless
13	Daniel Cavanagh	Monochrome
13	Enslaved	E
13	Exhumed	Death Revenge
13	Fozzy	Judas
13	Gothminister	The Other Side
13	Gruntruck	Gruntruck
13	L.A. Guns	The Missing Peace
13	MyChildren MyBride	Vicious World
13	Power Quest	Sixth Dimension
13	Robert Plant	Carry Fire
13	Samael	Hegemony
13	Through the Eyes of the Dead	Disomus
20	Bloodred Hourglass	Heal
20	Slipknot	Day of the Gusano: Live in Mexico
20	Amenra	Mass VI
20	Blut Aus Nord	Deus Salutis Meæ
20	Europe	Walk the Earth
20	Gwar	The Blood of Gods
20	Iron Monkey	9–13
20	Nick Oliveri	N.O. Hits at All, Vol. 3
20	Nogod	Proof
20	Oz	Transition State
20	Sons of Apollo	Psychotic Symphony
20	Trivium	The Sin and the Sentence
20	Veil of Maya	False Idol
20	VUUR	In This Moment We Are Free – Cities
20	We Came as Romans	Cold Like War
25	Concerto Moon	Tears of Messiah
25	Lovebites	Awakening from Abyss
27	10 Years	(How to Live) As Ghosts
27	All Pigs Must Die	Hostage Animal
27	Butcher Babies	Lilith
27	Communic	Where Echoes Gather
27	Forgotten Tomb	We Owe You Nothing
27	Gnaw	Cutting Pieces
27	Hollywood Undead	Five
27	Keldian	Darkness and Light
27	Madam X	Monstrocity
27	Misanthrope	ΑXΩ
27	Ne Obliviscaris	Urn
27	Powerman 5000	New Wave
27	Red	Gone
27	Savage Messiah	Hands of Fate
27	Serenity	Lionheart
27	Theory of a Deadman	Wake Up Call
27	Winds of Plague	Blood of My Enemy
27	Wolfshead	Leaden
31	Acid Witch	Evil Sound Screamers
31	Big Dumb Face	Where Is Duke Lion? He's Dead...

=== November ===
Day	Artist	Album
3	Annihilator	For the Demented
3	Cannibal Corpse	Red Before Black
3	Converge	The Dusk in Us
3	Like Moths to Flames	Dark Divine
3	Lustre	Still Innocence
3	Moonspell	1755
3	My Enemies & I	The Beast Inside
3	Primitive Race	Soul Pretender
3	Scour	Red (EP)
3	Umbra et Imago	Die Unsterblichen – Das zweite Buch
3	Zao	Pyrrhic Victory (EP)
10	Amberian Dawn	Darkness of Eternity
10	Antigama	Depressant (EP)
10	Destruction	Thrash Anthems II (compilation album)
10	Electric Wizard	Wizard Bloody Wizard
10	Elvenking	Secrets of the Magick Grimoire
10	Entheos	Dark Future
10	Evanescence	Synthesis
10	Jeff Scott Soto	Retribution
10	Pink Cream 69	Headstrong
10	Santa Cruz	Bad Blood Rising
10	Shakra	Snakes & Ladders
10	Sinsaenum	Ashes (EP)
10	Threat Signal	Disconnect
10	Toothgrinder	Phantom Amour
10	The Unguided	And the Battle Royale
10	Witchery	I Am Legion
10	Your Memorial	Your Memorial (EP)
13	Project46	Tr3s
17	Black Sabbath	The End (live album)
17	The Body & Full of Hell	Ascending a Mountain of Heavy Light
17	Cavalera Conspiracy	Psychosis
17	Fieldy	Bassically
17	Galactic Cowboys	Long Way Back to the Moon
17	Godflesh	Post Self
17	In Flames	Down, Wicked & No Good (EP)
17	Iron Maiden	The Book of Souls: Live Chapter (live album)
17	Oblivion	The Path Towards...
17	Phinehas	Dark Flag
17	Polkadot Cadaver	Get Possessed
17	Tarja	From Spirits and Ghosts (Score for a Dark Christmas)
19	Folkodia	Battle of the Milvian Bridge
21	Krallice	Go Be Forgotten
24	Cardiant	Mirrors
24	Jen Majura	InZENity
24	Loch Vostok	Strife
24	Taake	Kong Vinter
24	Thantifaxath	Void Masquerading as Matter (EP)
30	Silent Descent	Turn to Grey

=== December ===
Day	Artist	Album
1	Deinonychus	Ode to Acts of Murder, Dystopia and Suicide
1	The Faceless	In Becoming a Ghost
1	Five Finger Death Punch	A Decade of Destruction (compilation album)
1	Glassjaw	Material Control
1	Intervals	The Way Forward
1	Leviathan	The First Sublevel of Suicide (compilation album)
1	Morbid Angel	Kingdoms Disdained
1	Operation: Mindcrime	The New Reality
1	Pretty Boy Floyd	Public Enemies
1	Warrior Soul	Back on the Lash
5	Project 86	Sheep Among Wolves
7	Status Minor	Three Faces of Antoine
8	The Atomic Bitchwax	Force Field
8	Atrocity	Masters of Darkness (EP)
8	Cleric	Retrocausal
8	Coronatus	Secrets of Nature
8	Diablo Swing Orchestra	Pacifisticuffs
8	Ghost	Ceremony and Devotion (live album)
8	Iron Savior	Reforged – Riding on Fire
8	Schwarzer Engel	Sinnflut (EP)
8	War of Ages	Alpha
15	Asking Alexandria	Asking Alexandria
15	Autopsy	Puncturing the Grotesque (EP)
15	For All Eternity	The Will to Rebuild
15	Massacration	Live Metal Espancation (live album)
22	Tribulation	Lady Death (EP)
22	Venom	100 Miles to Hell (EP)
29	Nortt	Endeligt

Preceded by 2016	Heavy Metal Timeline; 2017	Succeeded by 2018
