= Woe =

Woe may refer to:

- Sadness or suffering
- Woe, Ghana, a town in Ghana's Volta region
- War of Emperium, a guild war in the MMORPG Ragnarok Online
- Wings Over Europe, a combat flight simulator
- WOEID (Where On Earth IDentifier), a geolocation taxonomy used by Yahoo! web services and others

== Music ==
- "Woe" (song), by the band Say Anything
- Woe (band), an American black metal band
- Woe, Is Me, an American metalcore band

== Religion ==
- The four woes of Jesus, a list denouncing those who are condemned (such as the rich) in Christian teaching, immediately following and contrasting the Beatitudes in the Gospel of Luke
- Woes of the Pharisees, a list of criticisms by Jesus against scribes and Pharisees
- Woes to the unrepentant cities, a list of criticisms by Jesus against the cities Chorazin, Bethsaida, and Capernaum
- The three woes, the last three of the seven trumpets in the Book of Revelation

== See also ==
- Norman's Woe, a reef in Massachusetts
- Woe is me (disambiguation)
- Woo (disambiguation)
