= Hyperion (poem) =

Abandoned epic poem by John Keats

Hyperion, a Fragment is an abandoned epic poem by 19th-century English Romantic poet John Keats. It was published in Lamia, Isabella, The Eve of St. Agnes, and Other Poems (1820). It is based on the Titanomachia, and tells of the despair of the Titans after their fall to the Olympians. Keats wrote the poem from late 1818 until the spring of 1819. The poem stops abruptly in the middle of the third book, with close to 900 lines having been completed. He gave it up as having "too many Miltonic inversions." He was also nursing his younger brother Tom, who died on 1 December 1818 of tuberculosis.

Keats picked up the ideas again in his unfinished poem The Fall of Hyperion: A Dream (1856), published after his death. He attempted to recast the epic by framing it with a personal quest to find truth and understanding.

These poems were Keats' final attempt to reconcile his perceived conflict between mortal decay and absolute value.

== Plot ==
=== Background ===
The Titans are a pantheon of gods who ruled prior to the Olympians and are now destined to fall. They include Saturn (king of the gods), Ops (Saturn's wife), Thea (Hyperion's sister), Enceladus (cast as the god of war, though considered a Giant rather than a Titan in Greek mythology), Oceanus (god of the sea), Hyperion (the god of the sun) and Clymene (a young goddess).

=== Poem ===
The poem opens with Saturn deploring the loss of his power, which is being overtaken by Jupiter. Thea leads him to a place where the other Titans sit, similarly miserable, and they discuss whether they should fight back against their conquest by the new gods (the Olympians). Oceanus declares that he is willing to surrender his power to Neptune (the new god of the sea) because Neptune is more beautiful (this is worth bearing in mind in relation to the Romantic idea that beauty is paramount). Clymene describes first hearing the music of Apollo, which she found beautiful to the point of pain (another Romantic idea). Finally, Enceladus makes a speech encouraging the Titans to fight.

Meanwhile, Hyperion's palace is described, and we first see Hyperion himself, the only Titan who is still powerful. He is addressed by Uranus (old god of the sky, father of Saturn), who encourages him to go to where Saturn and the other Titans are. We leave the Titans with the arrival of Hyperion, and the scene changes to Apollo (the new sun god, also god of music, civilisation and culture) weeping on the beach. Here Mnemosyne (goddess of memory) encounters him and he explains to her the cause of his tears: he is aware of his divine potential, but as yet unable to fulfill it. By looking into Mnemosyne's eyes he receives knowledge which transforms him fully into a god.

The poem as usually printed breaks off at this point, in mid-line, with the word "celestial". Keats's friend Richard Woodhouse, transcribing this poem, completed this line as "Celestial Glory dawn'd: he was a god!"

== Style ==
The language of Hyperion is very similar to Milton's, in metre and style. However, Keats's characters are quite different. Although Apollo falls into the image of the "Son" from Paradise Lost and of "Jesus" from Paradise Regained, he does not directly confront Hyperion as Satan is confronted. Also, the roles are reversed, and Apollo is deemed as the "challenger" to the throne, who wins it by being more "true" and thus, more "beautiful."

== Extract ==
From Book I, lines spoken by the Titan Hyperion:

Saturn is fallen, am I too to fall?
Am I to leave this haven of my rest,
This cradle of my glory, this soft clime,
This calm luxuriance of blissful light,
These crystalline pavilions, and pure fanes,
Of all my lucent empire? It is left
Deserted, void, nor any haunt of mine.
The blaze, the splendour, and the symmetry,
I cannot see—but darkness, death and darkness.
Even here, into my centre of repose,
The shady visions come to domineer,
Insult, and blind, and stifle up my pomp.—
Fall!—No, by Tellus and her briny robes!
Over the fiery frontier of my realms
I will advance a terrible right arm
Shall scare that infant thunderer, rebel Jove,
And bid old Saturn take his throne again.

— lines 234-250

== Reception ==
The poem and the volume that contained it met positive reception upon publication. As of 2022, it is considered one of the most important works of Romantic poetry.

== Influence ==
Hyperion has influenced a number of later works:

- Dan Simmons's science fiction quartet, the Hyperion Cantos.
- The power metal band Keldian referenced the poem in the song "Hyperion" on the album Journey of Souls.
