= Back from the Edge (disambiguation) =

Back from the Edge is a 2016 album by James Arthur, and its title song.

Back from the Edge may also refer to:

- "Back from the Edge" (song), a 1996 song by Bruce Dickinson
- Back from the Edge, a 2006 album by The Green Ray
- Back from the Edge, a 2014 album by Mindmaze
- "Back from the Edge", a 2015 song by B12
