= With Serpents Scourge =

Studio album by Necrowretch
- Released: 16 February 2015
- Recorded: July 2014
- Studio: Microclimat Studios
- Genre: Death metal
- Length: 35:05
- Label: Century Media

Necrowretch studio albums chronology
Putrid Death Sorcery (2013)	With Serpents Scourge (2015)

Professional ratings
Review scores
Source	Rating
Metal Forces	8.5/10
Metal Temple	7/10

With Serpents Scourge is the second studio album by French death metal band Necrowretch. The album was released on February 16, 2015. On January 13, 2015 the album details were revealed. The album was released on CD, vinyl, and digital download. The track "Feast Off Their Doom" was also streamed on SoundCloud.

== Track listing ==
No.	Title	Length
1.	"Black Death Communion"	05:38
2.	"Feast Off Their Doom"	03:55
3.	"With Serpents Scourge"	05:00
4.	"By Evil and Beyond"	03:07
5.	"The Bells of Evil Schism"	03:44
6.	"He Thrones on Thy Sins"	03:59
7.	"Even Death May Die"	03:21
8.	"Infernal Imprecation (instrumental)"	00:57
9.	"Mortem Ritu"	05:24
Total length:		35:05

== Personnel ==
Necrowretch

- Vlad – vocals, guitar
- Amphycion – bass guitar
- Ilmar Marti Uibo – drums

Miscellaneous staff

- Milan Novaković – artwork
- Patrick W. Engel – mastering
- Kaos – layout, additional lyrics
- Skull Crusher – additional lyrics
