= Outbound (Keldian album) =

Studio album by Keldian
- Released: October 31, 2013
- Genre: Symphonic power metal
- Length: 52:07
- Labels: Galactic Butterfly Music; Perris Records
- Producer: Keldian

Keldian chronology
| Journey of Souls (2008) | Outbound (2013) | Darkness and Light (2017) |

Outbound is the third album by Norwegian symphonic power metal band Keldian. It was released on October 31, 2013 via Galactic Butterfly Music. Outbound was largely funded by a campaign on IndieGoGo, which raised $6,808 for the project between February 26, 2013 and April 27, 2013. Supporters of the campaign received a limited-edition signed copy of the album.

== Lyrical themes ==
The album starts with "Burn the Sky". Lyrically, the song is a critique of militarisation of space by such groups as the Project for a New American Century. It specifically refers to its influential report, Rebuilding America's Defenses: Strategies, Forces, and Resources For a New Century, which call to protect resources of rich and influential "haves" from poor and frustrated "have nots". "A Place Above the Air" is based on Dan Simmons' Endymion series.

== Track listing ==
All tracks are written by Keldian.

| No. | Title | Length |
|---|---|---|
| 1. | "Burn the Sky" | 4:21 |
| 2. | "Earthblood" | 5:04 |
| 3. | "Never Existed" | 4:12 |
| 4. | "Morning Light Mountain" | 7:06 |
| 5. | "Kepler and 100 000 Stars" | 5:06 |
| 6. | "The Silfen Paths" | 11:56 |
| 7. | "Run for Your Life" | 3:23 |
| 8. | "A Place Above the Air" | 4:16 |
| 9. | "F.T.L." | 6:46 |
| 10. | "Scoundrel Days (A-ha cover)" (Contributor's Edition bonus track) | 4:41 |
| Total length: | | 56:48 |

== Personnel ==
- Christer Andresen – lead vocals, guitars, bass
- Arild Aardalen – synthesizers, vocals

Additional musicians

- Jørn Holen – drums
- Thommie Myhrvold – vocals
- Helene Hande Midje – vocals
- Kjell Vidar Merkesdal – vocals
