= A Shade of My Former Self =

Studio album by The Charm The Fury
- Released: 16 September 2013
- Recorded: 2013
- Genre: Metalcore
- Length: 41:36
- Label: Listenable Records
- Producer: Mathijs Tieken

The Charm The Fury chronology
A Shade of My Former Self (2013)	The Sick, Dumb & Happy (2017)

Singles from A Shade of My Former Self
- 1. "Virtue of Leadership" Released: 15 June 2012; 2. "Carte Blanche" Released: 16 September 2013; 3. "Colorblind" Released: 24 April 2014

A Shade of My Former Self is the debut studio album by Dutch band The Charm The Fury. It was released on 16 September 2013 through Listenable Records.

== Track listing ==
All tracks are written by The Charm The Fury

No.	Title	Length
1.	"The Unveiling"	1:56
2.	"A Testament"	3:17
3.	"Carte Blanche"	3:46
4.	"A Shade of My Former Self"	4:22
5.	"The Enemy" (featuring Jamie Graham)	4:12
6.	"Colorblind" (featuring Daniel de Jongh of Textures)	3:12
7.	"In the Wake of Pride"	1:42
8.	"Living Saints"	3:23
9.	"Heartless, Breathless"	3:40
10.	"Virtue of Leadership"	4:42
11.	"A New State of Mind"	4:03
12.	"Deliverence"	4:16
Total length:		41:36

== Personnel ==
=== The Charm The Fury ===
- Caroline Westendorp – vocals
- Mathijs Tieken – drums
- Rolf Perdok – guitars
- Lucas Arnoldussen – bass
- Mathijs Parent – guitars

=== Guest musicians ===
- Jamie Graham – additional vocals (track 5)
- Daniel de Jongh – additional vocals (track 6)

=== Production ===
- Mathijs Tieken – producer, engineering, mixing
- Will Putney – mastering
- Stefan Karlsson – drum engineering, drum production
- Jon Barmby – art direction, design
