= Metanoia (Persefone album) =

Studio album by Persefone
- Released: 4 February 2022
- Recorded: 2021
- Genre: Progressive death metal, alternative metal, djent, technical death metal
- Length: 57:45
- Label: Napalm Records

Persefone chronology
Aathma (2017)	Metanoia (2022)

Professional ratings
Review scores
Source	Rating
Metal Injection	8.5/10
New Noise Magazine	4/5 stars

Metanoia is the sixth studio album by Andorran metal band Persefone. It was released on 4 February 2022 by label Napalm Records. A music video for "Merkebah" was released alongside the album's announcement on 16 November 2021. The 11-minute instrumental "Consciousness (Pt.3)" continues the "Consciousness" suite from their 2013 album Spiritual Migration.

== Track listing ==
All tracks are written by Persefone.

No.	Title	Length
1.	"Metanoia"	1:55
2.	"Katabasis"	4:32
3.	"Architecture of the I"	6:11
4.	"Leap of Faith"	5:05
5.	"Aware of Being Watched"	7:27
6.	"Merkabah"	5:59
7.	"Consciousness (Pt.3)"	11:06
8.	"Anabasis": "Pt.1"; "Pt.2"; "Pt.3"	15:30: 2:49; 8:11; 4:30
Total length:		57:45

== Personnel ==
Persefone

- Marc Martins: vocals
- Carlos Lozano: guitars
- Miguel Espinosa: keyboards, vocals
- Tony Mestre: bass
- Sergi Verdeguer: drums
- Filipe Baldaia: guitars

Guest musicians

- Einar Solberg (Leprous): vocals (track 1)
- Steffen Kummerer (Obscura): guitars (track 8 part 2)
- Angel Vivaldi: guitars (track 8 part 2)
- Merethe Soltvedt (Two Steps from Hell): vocals (tracks 5 and 8 part 2)

Production

- Mixed by David Castillo (Leprous, Soen, Opeth)
- Mastered by Tony Lindgren (Enslaved, Ihsahn, Sepultura)
- Artwork by Jon Ojibway
