= Informis Infinitas Inhumanitas =

Studio album by Origin
- Released: June 11, 2002
- Recorded: Studio One, Wisconsin; 2001
- Genre: Technical death metal
- Length: 28:32
- Label: Relapse
- Producer: Origin and Colin Davis

Origin chronology
Origin (2000)	Informis Infinitas Inhumanitas (2002)	Echoes of Decimation (2005)

Informis Infinitas Inhumanitas is the second studio album by American technical death metal band Origin. The album was released on June 11, 2002 through Relapse Records.

The album title was originally a play on the saying "Intensity Integrity Intelligence" from Kurt Angle, then crudely translated from Latin as "boundless shapeless inhumanity"

The sample at the start of "Inhuman" is from Dogma.

The sample at the start of "Meat for the Beast" is from Interview with the Vampire.

Professional ratings
Review scores
Source	Rating
Allmusic	3/5 stars
Metal.de	9/10

== Critical reception ==
Vampster said the production is better than on the previous album and called the album essential for death metal fans.

== Track listing ==
No.	Title	Music	Length
1.	"Larvae of the Lie"	Ryan music, Lee lyrics	3:03
2.	"Inhuman"	Manning, Turner music, Lee lyrics	2:38
3.	"Awaken the Suffering"	Turner, Ryan music, Lee lyrics	3:07
4.	"Perversion of Hate"	Ryan music, Lee Lyrics	2:53
5.	"Portal"	Ryan music. Lee Lyrics	3:17
6.	"Meat for the Beast"	Ryan music, Lee, Ryan lyrics	3:06
7.	"Mental Torment"	Manning, Ryan music, Manning, Ryan lyrics	2:58
8.	"Insurrection"	Turner music, Lee lyrics	4:24
9.	"Implosion of Eternity"	Ryan music, Lee lyrics	3:06
10.	"Flattening of Emotions" (Death cover; bonus track)	Chuck Schuldiner	4:13
Total length:			32:45

== Credits ==
- James Lee - vocals
- Paul Ryan - guitars / vocals
- Jeremy Turner - guitars / vocals
- Mike Flores - Bass
- John Longstreth - drums
- Colin E. Davis - Co producer, Engineer, Mastering
- Chris Djurcic - Engineer
- Kane Jewlett - Engineer
- Chad Michael Ward - Artwork
- Celeste Peterson - Photos
