= Omnipresent (Origin album) =

Studio album by Origin
- Released: July 8, 2014 (US); July 4, 2014 (EU)
- Recorded: January 2014
- Studio: Chapman Studios (Lenexa, Kansas)
- Genre: Technical death metal
- Length: 36:56
- Label: Nuclear Blast (US), Agonia Records (EU)
- Producer: Robert Rebeck

Origin chronology
Entity (2011)	Omnipresent (2014)	Unparalleled Universe (2017)

Professional ratings
Review scores
Source	Rating
About.com	3.5/5 stars
Metal.de	9/10
Rock Hard	9/10

Omnipresent is the sixth studio album by American technical death metal band Origin. The album was released on July 8, 2014. This is the band's first album to feature vocalist Jason Keyser.

The album reached number 10 on the US Billboard Top New Artist Albums (Heatseekers).

== Track listing ==
No.	Title	Length
1.	"All Things Dead"	3:35
2.	"Thrall:Fulcrum:Apex"	1:07
3.	"Permanence" (instrumental)	1:00
4.	"Manifest Desolate"	4:16
5.	"The Absurdity of What I Am"	2:41
6.	"Source of Icon O"	2:01
7.	"Continuum" (instrumental)	1:53
8.	"Unattainable Zero"	4:41
9.	"Redistribution of Filth"	3:23
10.	"Obsolescence" (instrumental)	1:33
11.	"Malthusian Collapse"	4:11
12.	"The Indiscriminate"	4:23
13.	"Kill Yourself" (S.O.D. cover)	2:12
Total length:		36:56

== Personnel ==
Origin

- Jason Keyser - lead vocals
- Paul Ryan - guitars, backing vocals
- Mike Flores - bass, backing vocals
- John Longstreth - drums

Additional musicians

- Jason Kiss - keyboards (on "Obsolescence")
- Rob Rebeck - keyboards (on "Continuum"), additional keyboards
- Chris Wilson - additional vocals (on "All Things Dead")

Production

- Colin Marks - artwork, layout
- Colin Marston - mixing, mastering
- Robert Rebeck - producer, engineering, recording, mixing
