= Origin (Origin album) =

Studio album by Origin
- Released: July 11, 2000
- Recorded: 1999
- Studio: Studio One, Wisconsin
- Genre: Technical death metal; brutal death metal
- Length: 29:49
- Label: Relapse
- Producer: Origin

Origin chronology
A Coming into Existence (1998)	Origin (2000)	Informis Infinitas Inhumanitas (2002)

Professional ratings
Review scores
Source	Rating
Chronicles of Chaos	8.5/10
Rock Hard	8.5/10

Origin is the debut studio album by American death metal band Origin. The album has a rawer and less technically proficient sound compared to their more technical later albums. The album was the first death metal album released on a label to incorporate the use of gravity blasts, although the band's original drummer George Fluke used the gravity blast on their 1998 EP A Coming into Existence.

This is the Origin's only album without bassist Mike Flores, and their only album with bassist Doug Williams and singer Mark Manning.

== Critical reception ==
Vampster called the album a masterpiece and recommended it to fans of Dying Fetus and Suffocation. Encomium wrote: "There are 9 bone-crushing, gut-ripping, cranium-tormenting Death/Grind tunes executed with a magnificent precision." Chronicles of Chaos said: "Pleasant thoughts these are not, but neither is Origin. Damn fine music to wreck your mind to."

== Track listing ==
No.	Title	Music	Length
1.	"Lethal Manipulation (The Bonecrusher Chronicles)"	Ryan	2:26
2.	"Sociocide"	Appelhanz/Turner	4:12
3.	"Vomit You Out"		3:20
4.	"Origin"	Ryan	2:55
5.	"Mental Torment"	Ryan	3:49
6.	"Manimal Instincts"	Ryan	3:00
7.	"Infliction"		3:44
8.	"Disease Called Man"	Ryan	2:51
9.	"Inner Reflections"	Ryan	3:26
Total length:			29:49

== Personnel ==
Origin

- Mark Manning – lead vocals
- Paul Ryan – guitars, vocals
- Jeremy Turner – guitars, vocals
- Doug Williams – bass
- John Longstreth – drums

Production

- Produced by Chris Wisco
- Mastered by Dave Shirk
- Photography by Liz Caldwell
