= Echoes of Decimation =

Studio album by Origin
- Released: March 15, 2005
- Recorded: November 2004 at Black Lodge Recording Studio in Eudora, Kansas
- Genre: Technical death metal
- Length: 26:28
- Label: Relapse
- Producers: Origin, Clinton Appelhanz, Robert Rebeck

Origin chronology
Informis Infinitas Inhumanitas (2002)	Echoes of Decimation (2005)	Antithesis (2008)

Professional ratings
Review scores
Source	Rating
Blabbermouth.net	3/10
Metal.de	9/10
Rock Hard	7/10

Echoes of Decimation is the third studio album by American technical death metal band Origin. It was released through Relapse Records, on March 15, 2005.

A focus-point on extremely fast arpeggios was made on this album. The band later called these "RIFFARPS" as they were arpeggios as a form of a riff instead of being used as a solo.

== Track listing ==
No.	Title	Music	Length
1.	"Reciprocal"	Paul Ryan	2:26
2.	"Endless Cure"	Paul Ryan	2:21
3.	"The Burner"	Paul Ryan	2:20
4.	"Designed to Expire"		3:11
5.	"Cloning the Stillborn"		2:13
6.	"Staring from the Abyss"	Paul Ryan	3:57
7.	"Amoeba"		2:19
8.	"Debased Humanity"		3:39
9.	"Echoes of Decimation"		4:02
Total length:			26:28

== Credits ==
- James Lee - vocals
- Paul Ryan - guitars / writing credits track 1-2-3-6
- Clinton Appelhanz - guitars / writing credits track 4-7-8-9, engineer
- Mike Flores - bass writing credits track 5
- James King - drums
- Robert Rebeck - engineer
- Alan Douches - mastering
- Robert Black - artwork

Was released as CD & limited edition Picture Disc
