= Antithesis (Origin album) =

Studio album by Origin
- Released: April 1, 2008
- Genre: Technical death metal
- Length: 42:10
- Label: Relapse
- Producer: Origin

Origin chronology
Echoes of Decimation (2005)	Antithesis (2008)	Entity (2011)

Antithesis is the fourth studio album by American technical death metal band Origin. It was released through Relapse Records, on April 1, 2008. It peaked at #21 on the Billboard Top Heatseekers chart. This is the band's last album to feature vocalist James Lee and guitarist and founding member Jeremy Turner.

Antithesis was seen as Origin's breakthrough album; it ranked #7 on Decibel magazine's Top 40 Metal Releases of 2008 as well as #6 on Metal Maniacs Top 40 metal Releases of 2008. Decibel would again rank it later on for their Top 100 Death Metal Albums of All Time (where it was placed at 85). The album was released on CD and limited edition colored vinyl with an alternative cover artwork.

== Reception ==
Professional ratings
Review scores
Source	Rating
About.com	4/5 stars
Allmusic	3.5/5 stars
Blabbermouth.net	9/10 stars
Kerrang!	4/5 stars
Rock Hard	7/10

The Allmusic review by Greg Prato awarded the album 3.5 stars stating "Although death metal and prog metal are usually thought of as two different subgenres of heavy metal, in certain cases, there's really not much differentiating the two. Case in point, Origin, and their 2008 release, Antithesis. Although they are extreme sounding in just about every way imaginable (guttural growls, stop-start riffing, metronome-perfect drumming, etc.), the instrumental prowess of Origin's players is mighty impressive here. But be forewarned -- there's not an ounce of melody detected anywhere (just front to back metallic brutality), as evidenced by such over the top assaults as the album opener, "The Aftermath," as well as "Consuming Misery" and "Wrath of Vishnu," among others. Whether you love it or hate it, most would have to agree that Origin's Antithesis is certainly death metal at its most complex and challenging. ".

According to Kerrang! which gave the album 4 stars, the band "...once again pack in more untrammelled ferocity and sheer sonic destruction than can be good for anyone's health". "The album hurtles by on a torrent of almost inhuman blasting, technical fret mangling and the vomitous vocal of James Lee. While there is always a problem that music that relentless can become a little one-dimensional, the blistering intensity demands your attention from violent start to battered finish", reviewer Dan Slesser writes, picking out "the jaw-dropping" 9.5 minute closing title track as the CD's highlight which "definitely slams the door in the face of all corners".

== Track listing ==
No.	Title	Music	Length
1.	"The Aftermath"	Paul Ryan	4:39
2.	"Algorithm"	Jeremy Turner	3:32
3.	"Consuming Misery"	Turner, Mike Flores	4:06
4.	"Wrath of Vishnu"	Paul Ryan	4:44
5.	"Finite"	Paul Ryan	3:08
6.	"The Appalling"	Turner, Flores	2:55
7.	"Void (instrumental)"	John Longstreth	0:40
8.	"Ubiquitous"	Turner, Flores	5:34
9.	"The Beyond Within"	Paul Ryan	3:20
10.	"Antithesis"	Paul Ryan	9:32
Total length:			42:10

== Personnel ==
- James Lee - vocals
- Paul Ryan - guitar, vocals
- Jeremy Turner - guitar, vocals
- Mike Flores - bass, vocals
- John Longstreth - drums

== Production ==
- Arranged & Produced By Origin
- Engineered By Robert Rebeck
- Mastered By Scott Hull
