= Entity (album) =

Studio album by Origin
- Released: (United States) June 7, 2011 (Europe) June 10, 2011 (Japan) June 22, 2011
- Recorded: Chapman Recording Studios, Lenexa, Kansas
- Genre: Technical death metal
- Length: 36:31
- Label: Nuclear Blast, Nippon Columbia
- Producer: Origin

Origin chronology
Antithesis (2008)	Entity (2011)	Omnipresent (2014)

Entity is the fifth studio album by American technical death metal band Origin. It was released through Nuclear Blast, on June 7, 2011. It was released on CD & Vinyl.

The album reached number 20 on the US Billboard Top New Artist Albums (Heatseekers).

== Reception ==
Professional ratings
Review scores
Source	Rating
About.com	4/5 stars
Allmusic	4.5/5 stars
Blabbermouth.net	9.5/10 stars
MetalStorm	7.5/10
Rock Hard	7.5/10

== Track listing ==
All tracks are written by Origin.

No.	Title	Length
1.	"Expulsion of Fury"	2:50
2.	"Purgatory"	1:25
3.	"Conceiving Death"	4:00
4.	"Swarm"	2:15
5.	"Saligia"	6:52
6.	"The Descent"	1:31
7.	"Fornever"	2:09
8.	"Committed"	1:56
9.	"Banishing Illusion"	1:41
10.	"Consequence of Solution"	7:09
11.	"Evolution of Extinction"	4:43
12.	"You Fail!" (Mail Order Bonus Track)	3:15
Total length:		39:46

== Personnel ==
- Paul Ryan - guitar, vocals
- Mike Flores - bass, vocals
- John Longstreth - drums
- Colin Marks - cover art, layout
- Robert Rebeck - engineering, mixing
- Colin Marston - mastering
