= Woes to the unrepentant cities =

Biblical curse

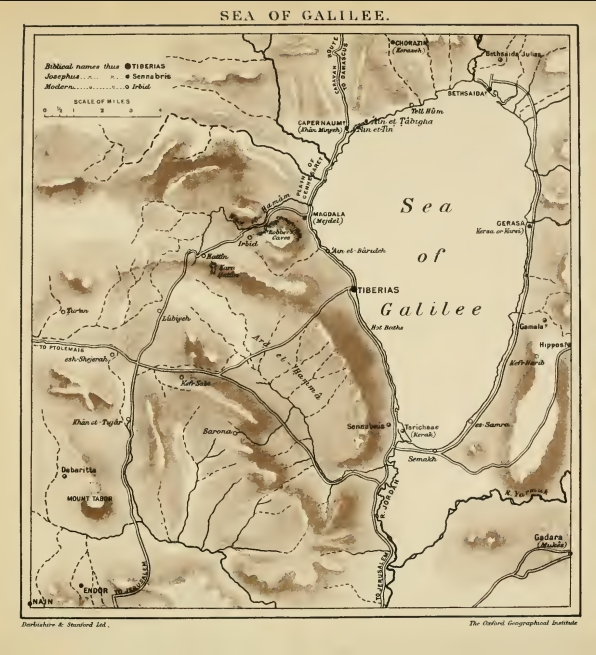
The three unrepentant cities lay around the northern shore of the Sea of Galilee.

The "Woes to the unrepentant cities" are a set of significant passages in the Gospels of Matthew and Luke that record Jesus' pronouncement of judgement on several Galilean cities that have rejected his message despite witnessing his miracles. This episode marks a crucial moment in Jesus' ministry, highlighting the consequences of refusing to repent and the responsibility that comes with receiving divine revelation.

Jesus' criticism of these cities reflects his frustration with their lack of faith and unwillingness to change, despite the numerous signs and wonders he performed among them. These passages provide insight into Jesus' expectations for his followers and the seriousness with which he viewed the rejection of his message.

== Text ==
=== Matthew's account ===
Then Jesus began to criticize openly the cities in which He had done many of his miracles, because they did not repent. "Woe to you, Chorazin! Woe to you, Bethsaida! If the miracles done in you had been done in Tyre and Sidon, they would have repented long ago in sackcloth and ashes. But I tell you, it will be more bearable for Tyre and Sidon on the day of judgment than for you! And you, Capernaum, will you be exalted to heaven? No, you will be thrown down to Hades! For if the miracles done among you had been done in Sodom, it would have continued to this day. But I tell you, it will be more bearable for the region of Sodom on the day of judgment than for you!"

— Matthew 11:20–24

=== Luke's account ===
"Woe unto thee, Chorazin! woe unto thee, Bethsaida! for if the mighty works had been done in Tyre and Sidon, which were done in you, they would have repented long ago, sitting in sackcloth and ashes. But it shall be more tolerable for Tyre and Sidon in the judgment, than for you. And thou, Capernaum, shalt thou be exalted unto heaven? thou shalt be brought down unto Hades. He that heareth you heareth Me; and he that rejecteth you rejecteth Me; and he that rejecteth Me rejecteth Him that sent Me."

— Luke 10:13–16

== Historical context ==
=== The Galilean cities ===
1. Chorazin: Located about two miles (3 km) north of the Sea of Galilee, Chorazin was a small town known for its basalt stone buildings. Archaeological excavations have uncovered a synagogue from the 3rd century AD, suggesting a thriving Jewish community.
2. Bethsaida: Situated on the northeastern shore of the Sea of Galilee, Bethsaida was the hometown of apostles Peter, Andrew, and Philip. It was also the site where Jesus healed a blind man (Mark 8:22-26).
3. Capernaum: Often called Jesus' "own city" (Matthew 9:1), Capernaum served as the center for Jesus' Galilean ministry. It was home to a synagogue where Jesus taught and performed miracles.

=== Tyre, Sidon, and Sodom ===
Tyre and Sidon were ancient Phoenician cities on the Mediterranean coast, known for their wealth and maritime trade. Old Testament prophets often denounced them for their pride and wickedness (Ezekiel 26-28, Isaiah 23). Sodom was infamous for its wickedness and destroyed by God in the time of Abraham (Genesis 19). It became a byword for divine judgment and extreme sinfulness in Jewish and Christian Tradition.

== Theological implications ==
1. Responsibility of Knowledge: Jesus' words imply that greater knowledge and exposure to divine truth bring greater responsibility. The Galilean cities had witnessed Jesus' miracles firsthand, making their unbelief more culpable than that of notoriously wicked Gentile cities.
2. Nature of Repentance: The passage emphasizes the importance of repentance as a response to divine revelation. Jesus expected that his miracles would lead to a change of heart and behavior.
3. Divine Judgment: Jesus' words affirm a future day of judgment, with degrees of punishment based on the opportunities given and rejected.
4. Messianic Authority: By pronouncing judgment on these cities, Jesus implicitly claims divine authority.

== The concept of "woe" in the Bible and related literature ==
The term "woe" (Greek: "ouai") is often used in prophetic literature to express divine displeasure and impending judgment. It appears frequently in the Old Testament prophets (Isaiah, Jeremiah) and in Jesus' teachings. The "woes" serve as both a lament and a warning, expressing sorrow over the cities' current state and educating the audience on the future consequences of such a state.

== Interpretations and scholarly perspectives ==
Cornelius a Lapide comments on the verse "Truly, I say unto you, it shall be more tolerable...", writing that the citizens of Tyre and Sidon will be punished because of their wickednesses, but that the Galilæans will be punished more severely: "1. Because ye had greater knowledge of God's law, and virtue. 2. Because ye have often heard Me preaching and exhorting to repentance, and have beheld Me doing many miracles, none of which things the Tyrians have either seen or heard." he draws the further moral point that Christians will be punished more severely in the day of judgment than Jews; the Roman citizens, than Indians; priests, nuns and monks, than laymen; if the former lived sinful lives, because "they have received greater degrees of grace and knowledge from God, and would not make use of them, but abused them to their own greater damnation."

== See also ==
- Woes of the Pharisees – a list of criticisms by Jesus against scribes and Pharisees
- The four woes of Jesus
