= Putrid Death Sorcery =

Studio album by Necrowretch
- Released: 28 January 2013
- Recorded: August 2012
- Studio: Blackoutmultimedia Studios in Brussels, Belgium
- Genre: Death metal
- Length: 35:46
- Label: Century Media
- Producer: Jeremy Bézier and Necrowretch

Necrowretch studio albums chronology
Putrid Death Sorcery (2013)	With Serpents Scourge (2015)

Professional ratings
Review scores
Source	Rating
Metal-Temple.com	8/10 stars
Blabbermouth.net	7.5/10 stars
Metal Storm	8.75/10 stars
Metal Hammer	4/7 stars
About.com	4/5 stars
Metal Forces	8/10 stars
The Monolith.com	7.5/10 stars

Putrid Death Sorcery is the first studio album by French death metal band Necrowretch. It was released in January 2013 on Century Media Records. The album was made available as a digital download and on CD and vinyl format, including a light blue vinyl version limited to 100 copies. A music video for "Putrid Death Sorcery" was released on 17 July 2013.

== Background ==
The album features similar vocal registers and growls to those of the death metal scene of the 90s, with black metal aspects featured in both the lyrics and music. High pitched growls and screams are frequent throughout the album.

== Release and promotion ==
The track listing, and album artwork designed by Milovan Novaković, were revealed on the band's official Facebook page on 5 December 2012. Necrowretch played shows at the Detest Records farewell show at Magasin 4, Brussels, Belgium and at the Deathkult Open Air 2013 in Göllnitz, Germany.

== Reception ==
Putrid Death Sorcery received generally positive reviews upon its release. Blabbermouth.net gave the album a 7.5/10, praising the album's "vintage death metal of the most impure kind" and comparing it to other thrash metal acts such as Kreator, Sodom, and Destruction, Swedish death metal acts such as Nihilist, Grave, Necrophobic, and American death metal acts such as Autopsy, Death, and Possessed. About.com gave the album a 4/5, saying it reminiscent of Skeletonwitch "if they removed the black metal", and praising the "old-school" production and style of the music. Metal Forces magazine gave the album an 8/10, calling the band "everything a blackened death thrash band should be – sinister, brooding and downright bile-filled".

== Recording ==
Necrowretch recorded the album at Blackoutmultimedia Studios in Brussels over a 10-day period, as the studio was located in the basement, the band slept in the basement with their instruments. Vlad describes it as "...a hellish recording session! The studio was located in the basement, and we were really living in this basement for ten days – seeing the light of the sun only a few minutes per day, eating shitty food, and sleeping in the ground with our instruments. You can truly imagine that all of that madness put us into frantic conditions to play at the maximum speed with all of our guts throughout the album."

== Track listing ==
All lyrics are written by Necrowretch, Skullcrusher and Kaos; all music is composed by Necrowretch

No.	Title	Length
1.	"Ripping Souls of Sinners"	2:37
2.	"Purifying Torment"	3:21
3.	"Goat-Headed"	3:04
4.	"Putrid Death Sorcery"	3:52
5.	"Impious Plague in Catacombs"	3:35
6.	"Spewed from Hell"	3:29
7.	"Defiler of Sacrality"	3:16
8.	"The Anthropomancer"	4:26
9.	"Soiled into a Crypt"	2:26
10.	"Necrollections"	3:03
11.	"Repugnizer"	2:35
Total length:		35:46

== Personnel ==
All information is derived from the enclosed booklet.

Necrowretch

- Vlad – Vocals, Guitar
- Amphycion – Bass

Additional musicians

- Mörkk – Drums

Technical staff and artwork

- Milovan Novaković – cover artwork, logo
- Jeremy Bézier – engineering, mixing
- Kaos – graphic design, additional lyrics
- Marla Bloom – photography
- Skullcrusher – additional lyrics
