= The Charm the Fury =

Dutch metal band

The Charm The Fury
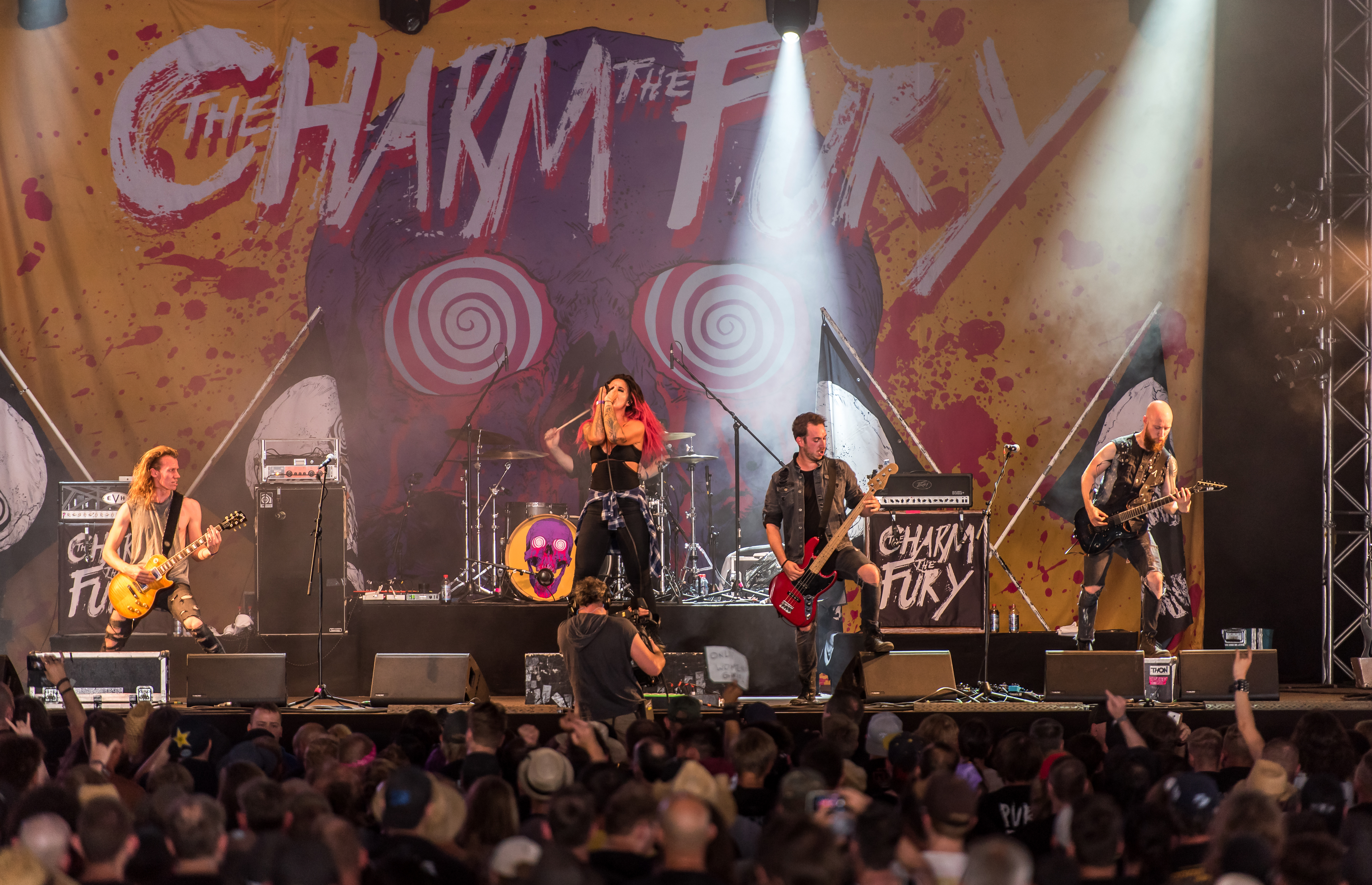
- The Charm The Fury

Background information
- Origin: Amsterdam, Netherlands
- Genres: Nu metal; groove metal; metalcore
- Years active: 2010–2018
- Labels: Nuclear Blast; Listenable Records; Arising Empire
- Members: Caroline Westendorp; Mathijs Tieken; Koen Stokman; Lucas Arnoldussen; Martijn Slegtenhorst
- Past members: Mathijs Parent; Rolf Perdok
- Website: thecharmthefury.com

The Charm The Fury was a Dutch metal band from Amsterdam, formed in 2010.

In 2013 The Charm The Fury released their first album, A Shade of My Former Self, throughout Listenable Records, after independently releasing the EP The Social Meltdown, back in 2012. In 2014, the band played at FortaRock Festival in Nijmegen and in 2015 at Graspop Metal Meeting in Belgium. In 2017, the band released their second album, The Sick, Dumb & Happy, though Nuclear Blast.

On 20 November 2018 the band announced they were breaking up due to line-up changes and financial reasons.

== Band members ==
Final lineup

- Caroline Westendorp – vocals (2010–2018)
- Lucas Arnoldussen – bass guitar (2010–2018)
- Mathijs Tieken – drums (2010–2018)
- Martijn Slegtenhorst – rhythm guitar (2016–2018)
- Koen Stokman – lead guitar (2017–2018)

Previous members

- Mathijs Parent – rhythm guitar (2010–2016)
- Rolf Perdok – lead guitar (2011–2017)

Session members (live shows)

- Siebe Sol – bass guitar (2015–2018)

Timeline

== Discography ==
=== Studio albums ===
- A Shade of My Former Self (2013)
- The Sick, Dumb & Happy (2017)

=== EPs ===
- The Social Meltdown (2012)

== Sources ==
- Volkskrant over TCTF (Dutch article)
- Interview op metalfan.nl (Dutch article)
