= Woe is me =

Woe is me is an archaic idiom expressing sorrow or despair. It is an allusion to Psalm 120.

"Woe is me" also may refer to:

== TV ==
- "Woe Is Me", episode of 1980s television series My Little Pony

== Music ==
- "Woe Is Me", anthem by Thomas Tomkins
- Woe, Is Me (band), from Atlanta, Georgia
- Woe Is Me, album by Johnny Griffin and Dennis Irwin (Jazz Hour, 1988)

=== Songs ===
- "Woe Is Me", from musical The 25th Annual Putnam County Spelling Bee
- "Woe Is Me" (1956), The Cadillacs, Esther Navarro
- "Woe Is Me" (1963), Helen Shapiro, Sharon Sheeley, Jackie De Shannon
- "Woe Is Me" (1965), Ray Kimble and the Flaming Embers
- "Woe Is Me" (1973), Woe Is Me", Bobby Lee Trammell
- "Woe Is Me" (1979), Spike Milligan and Ed Welch
- "Oh Woe Is Me" (1982), Joan Jett and the Blackhearts, on I Love Rock 'n' Roll (album)
- "Oh! Woe Is Me" (2006), Rocketship, on Here Comes... Rocketship (album)
- "Whoa Is Me" (2010), by Down With Webster
- "Woe Is Meee" (2017), by Ghostpoet from Dark Days + Canapés
