= Unparalleled Universe =

Studio album by Origin
- Released: June 30, 2017 (US)
- Recorded: February 2017
- Studio: Chapman Studios (Lenexa, Kansas)
- Genre: Technical death metal
- Length: 40:54
- Label: Nuclear Blast (US), Agonia Records (EU)
- Producer: Robert Rebeck

Origin chronology
Omnipresent (2014)	Unparalleled Universe (2017)	Chaosmos (2022)

Unparalleled Universe is the seventh studio album by American technical death metal band Origin. The album was first announced in May 2017, with a release date a month after.

== Critical reception ==
Professional ratings
Review scores
Source	Rating
Metal Injection	9.5/10 stars
Metal Hammer	4/5 stars
BraveWords	8.5/10 stars
Ghost Cult	7.5/10 stars
Metal.de	7/10
Rock Hard	7.5/10

Olivier Badin of Metal Hammer praised the album as a " technical and brutal death metal tour de force", but criticized the second half of the track Unequivocal for "being basically just anoutro more than anything else." Greg Pratt of Brave Words & Bloody Knuckles spoke highly of the album for its energy. In particular, he praised the album's opening track Infinitesimal to the Infinite for having "an absurd amount of zest and passion, and swirling tech-death riffs to die for."

== Track listing ==
No.	Title	Length
1.	"Infinitesimal to the Infinite"	2:23
2.	"Accident and Error"	3:41
3.	"Cascading Failures, Diminishing Returns"	4:19
4.	"Mithridatic"	3:13
5.	"Truthslayer"	2:07
6.	"Invariance Under Transformation"	4:36
7.	"Dajjal"	2:34
8.	"A Burden of Prescience"	4:02
9.	"Unequivocal"	9:54
10.	"Revolución" (Brujeria cover)	4:05
Total length:		40:54

== Personnel ==
Origin

- Paul Ryan - guitars, backing vocals
- Jason Keyser - lead vocals
- Mike Flores - bass, backing vocals
- John Longstreth - drums

Production

- Filip Ivanovic - artwork
- Colin Marston - mixing, mastering
- Robert Rebeck - producer, engineering, recording, mixing
