= Journey of Souls (album) =

Studio album by Keldian
- Released: May 20, 2008
- Genre: Symphonic power metal
- Length: 53:36
- Label: Perris Records
- Producer: Arild Aardalen

Keldian chronology
Heaven's Gate (2007)	Journey of Souls (2008)	Outbound (2013)

Journey of Souls is the second album by Norwegian symphonic power metal band Keldian, and was released worldwide in May 2008 by American label Perris Records. It was produced, engineered and mixed by Arild Aardalen and mastered by Mika Jussila at Finnvox Studios.

The album continues the band's science-fiction inspired lyrical themes and the melding of 80s era melodic rock with modern power and symphonic metal. The sci-fi lyrics are especially displayed in "The Last Frontier", which is based on Battlestar Galactica. However, the tracks "Reaper" and "God of War" show the band stretching their niche in both more melodic and more metallic directions. The album also features the Iron Maiden-sounding epic "Memento Mori".

The lyrics deal with the troubles and possibilities of souls traveling through space and time, which culminates in the closing number "Dreamcatcher", and the vocal line "In my dreams I can shape the future, a journey of souls to the end..."

== Track listing ==
1. "The Last Frontier" - 3:25
2. "Lords of Polaris" - 5:12
3. "Reaper" - 3:34
4. "The Ghost of Icarus" - 4:11
5. "Memento Mori" - 9:18
6. "Vinland" - 5:30
7. "The Devil in Me" - 4:28
8. "Hyperion" - 4:52
9. "God of War" - 4:56
10. "Starchildren" - 4:30
11. "Dreamcatcher" - 3:40

All songs by Andresen/Aardalen.

== Band ==
- Christer Andresen - lead vocals, electric & acoustic guitars, bass
- Arild Aardalen - keyboards, additional vocals

== Featured guests ==
- Jørn Holen - drums
- Per Hillestad - drums
- H-man - drums
- Anette Fodnes - vocals
- Maja Svisdahl - vocals
- Gjermund Elgenes - vocals
- Anne Marit Bergheim - vocals and mandolin
- Gunhild Mathea Olaussen - violin
- Asle Tronrud - harding fiddle
