= Origin (band) =

American technical death metal band

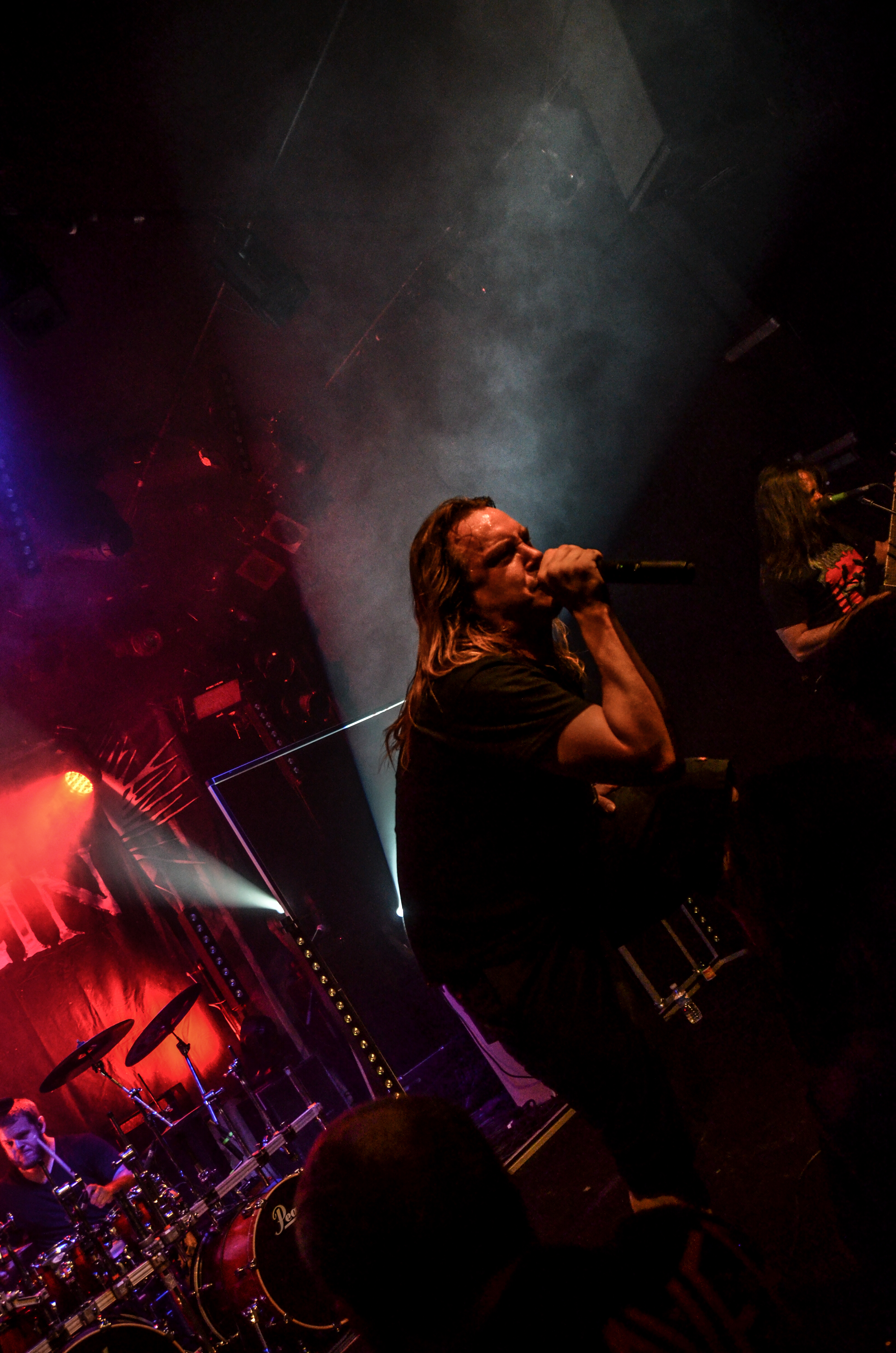
- Origin performing in 2014

Background information
- Also known as: Necrotomy (1990–1993); Thee Abomination (1993–1997)
- Origin: Topeka, Kansas, U.S.
- Genre: Technical death metal
- Years active: 1990–present
- Labels: Relapse, Nuclear Blast, Agonia
- Members: Paul Ryan; Mike Flores; John Longstreth; Jason Keyser
- Past members: Jeremy Turner; George Fluke; James King; Doug Williams; Clint Appelhanz; Mark Manning; James Lee; Mica Meneke

Origin is an American technical death metal band from Topeka, Kansas, founded in 1990. They have released eight studio albums. The band broke through in the United States with the 2008 release of their fourth studio album, Antithesis, which peaked at number 21 on the Billboard Top Heatseekers chart.

== History ==
=== Beginnings ===
Kansas natives Paul Ryan and Jeremy Turner formed Origin in 1990. The two formed a death metal band to make technically proficient music. The band was known as Necrotomy from 1990 to 1993, then changed the name to Thee Abomination, although they did not capture the sound they were seeking. In October 1997, bassist Clint Appelhanz and vocalist Mark Manning joined, followed by drummer George Fluke in January 1998. The band toured as Origin.

On May 23, 1998, Origin opened for Suffocation. That summer, Origin recorded a four-song, self-financed and self-distributed demo, A Coming Into Existence. In October, the band secured an opening slot on the Death Across America Tour, which also featured Nile, Cryptopsy, Oppressor and Gorguts.

In February 1999, Fluke was replaced with John Longstreth and Doug Williams replaced Clint Appelhanz. The new lineup secured a show with Napalm Death on April 14. Various other regional shows followed, including a spot at the November to Dismember Metalfest in Texas. On December 16, Origin signed to Relapse Records.

=== Debut album ===
On July 11, 2000, Origin released its first studio album, Origin. Origin played the March Metal Meltdown in New Jersey and was invited to take part in Contaminated 2000. They shared the stage with Exhumed and Cephalic Carnage, and participated in another November to December in California. Origin joined Poland's Vader and label mates Cephalic Carnage and Dying Fetus, for the Death Across America 2000 Tour. Soon after, Origin embarked on another tour, alongside Candiria, Cryptopsy and Poison the Well. They made another Milwaukee Metalfest appearance in 2001, and participated in Summer Slaughter that year (the 1st version of "Summer Slaughter Tour" under a different booking agency Digger). Origin headlined a tour before beginning work on another album. The result, Informis Infinitas Inhumanitas, introduced singer James Lee and bassist Mike Flores.

=== Informis Infinitas Inhumanitas ===
The band's second album, Informis Infinitas Inhumanitas, was produced by the band with Colin E. Davis at Studio One in Racine, Wisconsin. Following its release, Origin toured with Nile, Arch Enemy and Hate Eternal. Following the tour, Jeremy Turner resigned from the band and Clint Appelhanz (playing guitar instead of bass guitar) returned. Origin toured with Immolation, Vader, and The Berzerker, followed by another tour with All That Remains, Scar Culture and Crematorium. Origin canceled a tour with Nuclear Assault in January 2003. Shortly after, John Longstreth resigned from the band and James King replaced him.

The band played its first show with the new line-up in September 2003 in Topeka, Kansas. At the concert, they shot a music video for the song "Portal", from Informis Infinitas Inhumanitas. The band headlined a west coast tour in January 2004 with Uphill Battle. In the summer, Origin toured the Midwest, playing the Milwaukee Metalfest 2004 and The Texas Death and Grindfest with label mates Soilent Green and Kill the Client.

=== Echoes of Decimation ===
On March 15, 2005, Origin released Echoes of Decimation, its third studio album. Fan reaction was mixed, with a review of Echoes in the student newspaper of Metropolitan Community College-Longview in Kansas City called it monotonous, yet nonetheless impressive due to the band members' instrumental prowess.

Numerous United States tours immediately followed, including headlining performances at the New England Metal and Hardcore Festival and Ohio Deathfest. The band then joined forces with Malevolent Creation and Animosity for a summer North American tour that was sold out at many venues. The tour for Origin was 52 days long, and only three shows had to be cancelled.

In early 2006, James King and Clint Appelhanz left Origin, and had joined death metal/grindcore group Unmerciful, along with Jeremy Turner and Tony Reust. In April, John Longstreth returned to Origin, and in May, the band played their first European show. They also embarked on another summer headlining tour across North America, with Paul Ryan performing all guitar parts.

=== Antithesis ===
In February and March 2007, Origin played in Europe with label mates Misery Index and Necrophagist, as well as newly signed fellow Topeka locals Diskreet. After the end of this tour, Jeremy Turner rejoined Origin and the band began to work on its next album. They finished recording in February 2008, and the resulting album, Antithesis, was released April 1, 2008, and peaked at No. 21 on the Billboard Top Heatseekers chart. The band released a music video for the Antithesis song "Finite" on May 23, 2008. The video began to be shown on television the next day, premiering on MTV2's Headbangers Ball.

=== Entity ===
The band went to record their fifth album, Entity, as a trio of Paul Ryan, Mike Flores and John Longstreth. Vocals were done by Ryan and Flores as vocalist James Lee was ejected from the band in late 2010. Lee later went on to join Minnesota based death metal band Face of Oblivion. In 2010, the band signed to German-based Nuclear Blast Records and recorded their debut for the label in November. After releasing Entity, Origin recruited Jason Keyser of Skinless for vocal duties. The band embarked on a tour with Hate Eternal, Vital Remains and Abysmal Dawn in North America. Soon after, Origin left to tour Europe with Psycroptic and Leng Tch'e. The band also headlined the American "Occupation Domination" tour along with Cattle Decapitation, Decrepit Birth, Aborted, Rings of Saturn and Battlecross in 2012.

== Musical style ==
The band has been noted for its technical skill, utilizing techniques such as blast beats and arpeggios and sweep picking on both the guitars and the bass guitar. Their songs often have odd time signatures as well.

== Discography ==
=== Studio albums ===
- Origin (2000)
- Informis Infinitas Inhumanitas (2002)
- Echoes of Decimation (2005)
- Antithesis (2008)
- Entity (2011)
- Omnipresent (2014)
- Unparalleled Universe (2017)
- Chaosmos (2022)

=== EPs ===
- A Coming into Existence (1998)

=== Compilations ===
- Abiogenesis – A Coming into Existence (2019)

== Members ==
=== Current members ===
- Paul Ryan – guitars, vocals (1997–present)
- Mike Flores – bass, vocals (2002–present)
- John Longstreth – drums (1999–2003, 2006–present)
- Jason Keyser – lead vocals (2011–present)

=== Former members ===
- Mark Manning – lead vocals (1997–2001)
- Clint Appelhanz – bass (1997–1999), guitars (2002–2006)
- Doug Williams – bass (1998–2013)
- George Fluke – drums (1998–1999)
- James King – drums (2003–2006)
- James Lee – lead vocals (2001–2010)
- Mica Meneke – lead vocals (2010–2011)
- Jeremy Turner – guitars, backing vocals (1997–2002, 2007–2010)
