= Divinity (band) =

Canadian heavy metal band

- Origin: Calgary, Alberta, Canada
- Genres: Melodic death metal, technical death metal
- Years active: 1997–present
- Labels: Nuclear Blast
- Members: Sean Jenkins; James Duncan; Jeff "Beast" Waite; Brett Duncan; Keith Branston
- Past members: Sacha Laskow; Nick Foster
- Website: www.divinity.ca

Divinity is a Canadian heavy metal band from Calgary, Alberta. They are currently unsigned to any major labels but have been signed in the past to Nuclear Blast and Candlelight. Formed in late 1997 by Sean Jenkins and James Duncan, the band name came from a lyric from the song Domination by Pantera - "A now blacked heart is reaching out in divinity."

The band released their first EP in 2002, and their first album, Allegory, in 2007, the latter picked up by Nuclear Blast for release in 2008. Second album The Singularity followed in 2009, and was reissued a year later by Candlelight Records.

They went on to release a series of three EPs between 2013 and 2017. These were compiled on the 2017 album The Immortalist.

== Discography ==
=== Albums ===
- Allegory (2008), self-released - reissued (2008), Nuclear Blast
- The Singularity (2009), self-released - reissued (2010), Candlelight

Compilations

- The Immortalist (2017)

=== EPs ===
- Intensify (2002)
- The Immortalist, Pt. 1: Awestruck (2013)
- The Immortalist, Pt. 2: Momentum (2016)
- The Immortalist, Pt. 3: Conqueror (2017)
