= Vattnet =

US musical group

- Also known as: Vattnet Viskar (2010–2016)
- Origin: Plaistow, New Hampshire, United States
- Genres: Black metal, post-metal, doom metal
- Years active: 2010–2018
- Labels: Century Media, Broken Limb, New Damage
- Members: Chris Alfieri; Seamus Menihane; Nick Thornbury; Casey Aylward
- Past members: Alan Sobodacha; Matt St. Jean

Vattnet, formerly known as Vattnet Viskar, was an American post-metal band from New Hampshire that have released three albums and a self-titled EP.

== History ==
Formed in Plaistow, New Hampshire in 2010, their name is Swedish for “the water is whispering”.

On June 16, 2015, Vattnet Viskar released their sophomore album titled Settler which was largely inspired by the Space Shuttle Challenger Disaster and Christa McAuliffe in particular. Guitarist Chris Alfieri stated in a June 17, 2015, interview with Decibel Magazine that, "Christa was from Concord, New Hampshire, the town that I live in. One of my first memories is the Challenger mission's demise, so it's a personal thing for me. But the album isn't about the explosion, it's about everything else. Pushing to become something else, something better. A transformation, and touching the divine." The group released a third LP "Vattnet" on September 15, 2017.

On February 22, 2018, Chris Alfieri announced the band had broken up.

== Discography ==
=== Studio albums ===
- Sky Swallower (2013, Century Media Records)
- Settler (2015, Century Media Records)
- Vattnet (2017, New Damage Records)

=== EPs ===
- Vattnet Viskar (2012, Broken Limb Recordings)

=== Demo ===
- Demo (2011, self-released)

== Band members ==
Final line-up

- Chris Alfieri – guitar (2010–2018)
- Seamus Menihane – drums (2012–2018)
- Casey Aylward – bass (2015–2018)

Former members

- Matt St. Jean – drums (2010–2012)
- Alan Sobodacha – bass (2010–2013)
- Nick Thornbury – vocals, guitar (2010–2016)
- Joey Perron – bass (2013)

Former live members

- Brett Boland – bass (2013–2014)
