= Hydrogyn =

American band formed 2004

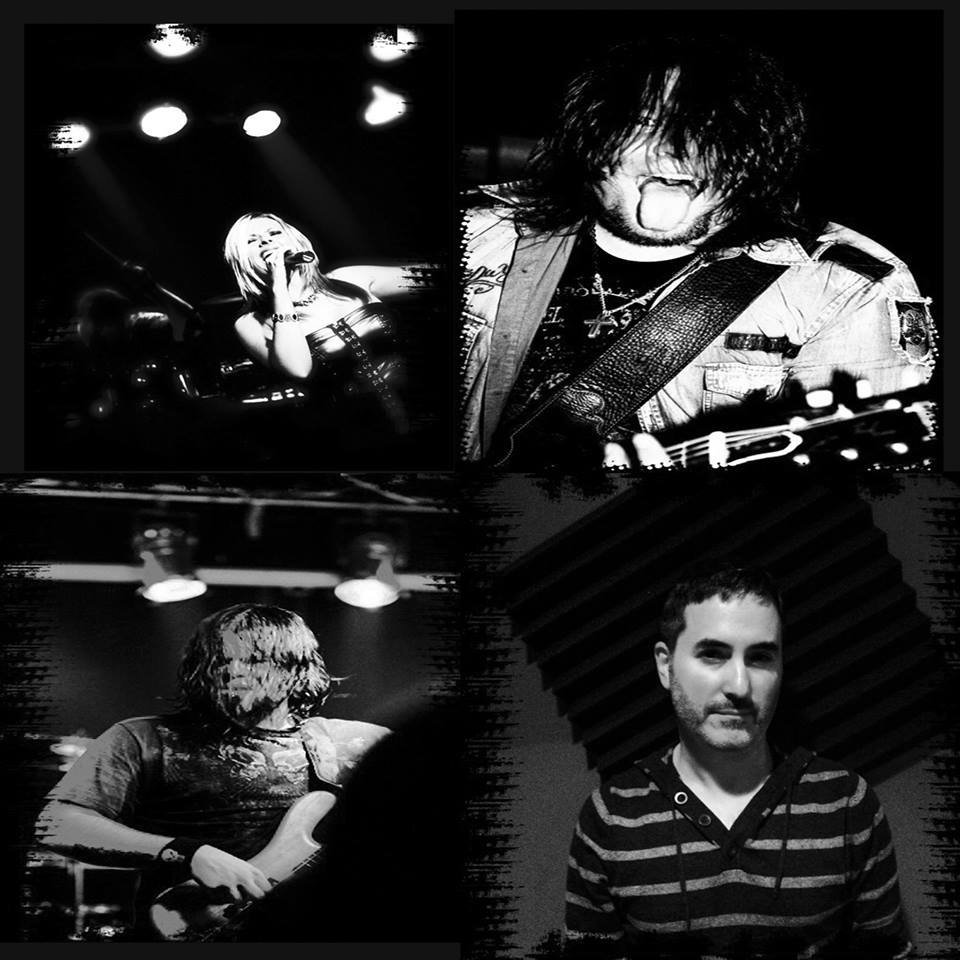
- Hydrogyn Ridgeline Studio Ashland, Ky

Background information
- Origin: Ashland, Kentucky, U.S.
- Genres: Hard rock, heavy metal
- Years active: 2004–present
- Members: Holly Hines Freed; Jeff Westlake; Ryan Stepp; Scot Clayton II; Jacob Freed
- Past members: Julie Westlake; Jason Fields; Jerry Lawson; Dave Moody; Josh Kitchen; Chris Sammons; Erica Parrott; John Cardilino; Jeff Boggs
- Website: www.hydrogyn.com

Hydrogyn is an American indie hard rock band from Ashland, Kentucky. The band was formed in 2004 by guitarists Jeff Westlake and Jeff Boggs and vocalist Julie Westlake. Achieving success with their second album Bombshell, they have released 6 full-length albums.

== History ==
The band formed in 2003, founded by guitarists Jeff Westlake and Jeff Boggs and country vocalist Julie Westlake. In 2004, the band released its self-produced debut album Best Served with Volume. The album attracted the attention of Pepsi, which endorsed the band and had them perform at NASCAR's Chevy Rocking 400 in May 2005. The popularity of the band further grew with the release of a professional video for The Sand, which was put in rotation in several music channels.

In spring 2005, they were contacted by metal producer Michael Wagener, who was impressed by the band and agreed to produce their next album. Released in September 2006, Bombshell entered three Billboard charts ("Top Heatseeker Northeast", "Top Internet Albums" and "Top Heatseeker") and sold over 8000 copies in Europe. Vocalist Westlake featured on several European music magazines, including Fireworks, Strutter, and Flash. The Bombshell tour (which spanned both Europe and the United States) was showcased in the first live release of the band, Strip'em Blind Live, released in July 2007.

In 2008 founder guitarist Boggs left the band. That same year a third studio album, Deadly Passions, was released. Jeff Young from Megadeth was briefly considered as a new guitarist, but was eventually turned down. All contributions by Young to the upcoming new album were dismissed and Boggs himself was asked to replay his guitar parts. Judgement, released in 2010, was another success, charting at #10 in Billboard's Top Heat Seeker. Another hiatus followed due to Julie Westlake's health problems, which lasted until mid 2011. Upon her return, the band recorded the new album Private Sessions, released in 2012.

== Discography ==
- Best Served With Volume (2004, self produced)
- Bombshell (2006, DA Records)
- Strip'em Blind Live (2007, DA Records)
- Deadly Passions (2008, Demolition Records)
- No Borders SVCD (2009, Rapid Fire Entertainment)
- Judgement (2010, Bad Reputation)
- Phase 1 (2010, Rapid Fire Entertainment)
- Deadly Passions Remastered (2011, Rapid Fire Entertainment)
- Private Sessions (2012, Rapid Fire Entertainment)
- Particles Box Set (2013, Rapid Fire Entertainment)
- Rock Me (single) (2013, Rapid Fire Entertainment)
- Break the Chains (2014, Rapid Fire Entertainment)
- Redemption (2017, RFL Records)
- Boiling Point (2020, RFL Records)

== Current lineup ==
- Holly Hines Freed (vocals)
- Jeff Westlake (guitar)
- Jacob Freed (bass)
- Scot Clayton II (drums)
- Ryan Stepp (guitar)
