= Leaden =

Studio album by Wolfshead
- Released: October 27, 2017
- Genre: Heavy metal; Doom metal; Hard rock
- Length: 38:08
- Label: Rockshots

Wolfshead chronology
Caput Lupinum (2015)	Leaden (2017)	II: Ravings from the Gutter (2025)

Leaden is the debut studio album by Finnish metal band Wolfshead. It was released on October 27, 2017, through Rockshots Records.

== Background and promotion ==
The album follows the release of two demos and an EP, Caput Lupinum (2015), and was initially announced on September 11, 2017. A lyric video for the song "Division Of The Damned" was released on October 23.

== Critical reception ==
Leaden
Review scores
Source	Rating
Dead Rhetoric	8/10
The Metal Crypt	3.5/5
Metal Na Lata	8/10
Metal Temple	8/10
Metalliluola	8/10

In a review for Dead Rhetoric, Katarina McGinn wrote: "Cooking up a musical stew of influences that rear back into the 60’s/70’s/early 80’s, it’s obvious that the quarter aim to keep the focus on doom, traditional, and NWOBHM riffing and conjoining melodies, the tempos swinging and grooving along in proper support." She concluded that "Wolfshead g[a]ve us another product to treasure."

Luxi Lahtinen, writing for The Metal Crypt, praised the band for "[going] back to the roots of Heavy Rock and Metal" and reproducing "that warm, organic, and authentic sound of the 70s". Johnny Z. of Metal Na Lata stated: "Using and abusing guitar riffs and powerful vocals, the band achieves great results in both fast-paced and more melancholic songs." Metal Temple's Joganegar applauded the group's willigness to experiment "with such distinctive and contrasting tones", describing the album as "A grade Metal". Joonas Hynninen of Metalliluola opined that the group properly paid tribute to their classic metal influences while maintaining their own sound; he also praised the album's low-key production.

Multiple reviewers noted influences from classic bands like Black Sabbath and Motörhead.

== Track listing ==
Leaden track listing
No.	Title	Length
1.	"Vukodlak"	4:41
2.	"Children Shouldn't Play With Dead Things"	4:11
3.	"Purifier"	4:12
4.	"When The Stars Are Right"	6:22
5.	"Division Of The Damned"	5:01
6.	"Haruspex"	4:01
7.	"Winds Over Potter's Field"	1:54
8.	"The Hangman"	7:43
Total length:		38:08
