= The Sick, Dumb & Happy =

Studio album by The Charm The Fury
- Released: 17 March 2017
- Recorded: 2016
- Studio: Backbone Audio (Amsterdam, Netherlands), ICP Studios (Brussels, Netherlands), Sandlane Studios (Rijen, Netherlands) and Sub-Bass Studios (Zwijndrecht, Netherlands)
- Genre: Nu metal; groove metal
- Length: 42:14
- Label: Nuclear Blast
- Producer: Mathijs Tieken

The Charm The Fury chronology
| A Shade of My Former Self (2013) | The Sick, Dumb & Happy (2017) |

Singles from The Sick, Dumb & Happy
- 1. "Down on the Ropes" Released: 20 January 2017; 2. "Echoes" Released: 25 February 2017; 3. "Blood and Salt" Released: 8 April 2017; 4. "Songs of Obscenity" Released: 26 January 2018

The Sick, Dumb & Happy is the second and final studio album by Dutch band The Charm The Fury. It was released on 17 March 2017 through Nuclear Blast. It is the first album to feature rhythm guitarist Martijn Slegtenhorst.

== Track listing ==
All tracks are written by The Charm The Fury

| No. | Title | Length |
|---|---|---|
| 1. | "Down on the Ropes" | 3:23 |
| 2. | "Echoes" | 4:39 |
| 3. | "Weaponized" | 3:55 |
| 4. | "No End in Sight" | 3:57 |
| 5. | "Blood and Salt" | 5:10 |
| 6. | "Corner Office Maniacs" | 0:56 |
| 7. | "The Future Needs Us Not" | 3:30 |
| 8. | "Silent War" | 4:12 |
| 9. | "The Hell in Me" | 3:59 |
| 10. | "Songs of Obscenity" | 4:12 |
| 11. | "Break and Dominate" | 4:17 |
| Total length: | | 42:14 |

== Personnel ==
=== The Charm The Fury ===
- Caroline Westendorp – vocals
- Mathijs Tieken – drums
- Rolf Perdok – guitars
- Lucas Arnoldussen – bass
- Martijn Slegtenhorst – guitars

=== Production ===
- Mathijs Tieken – production, engineering, mixing on "Corner Office Maniacs"
- Daniel Gibson – additional production
- Robert Westerholt – additional production
- Stefan Helleblad – guitar engineering, drum engineering
- Josh Wilbur – mixing
- Stefan Glaumann – mixing on "Silent War"
- Ted Jensen – mastering
- Brian "Big Bass" Gardner – mastering on "Corner Office Maniacs" and "Silent War"
- Robert Sammelin – illustrations, design

== Charts ==
| Chart (2017) | Peak position |
|---|---|
| Belgian Albums (Ultratop Flanders) | 136 |
