= Persefone =

Andorran progressive death metal band

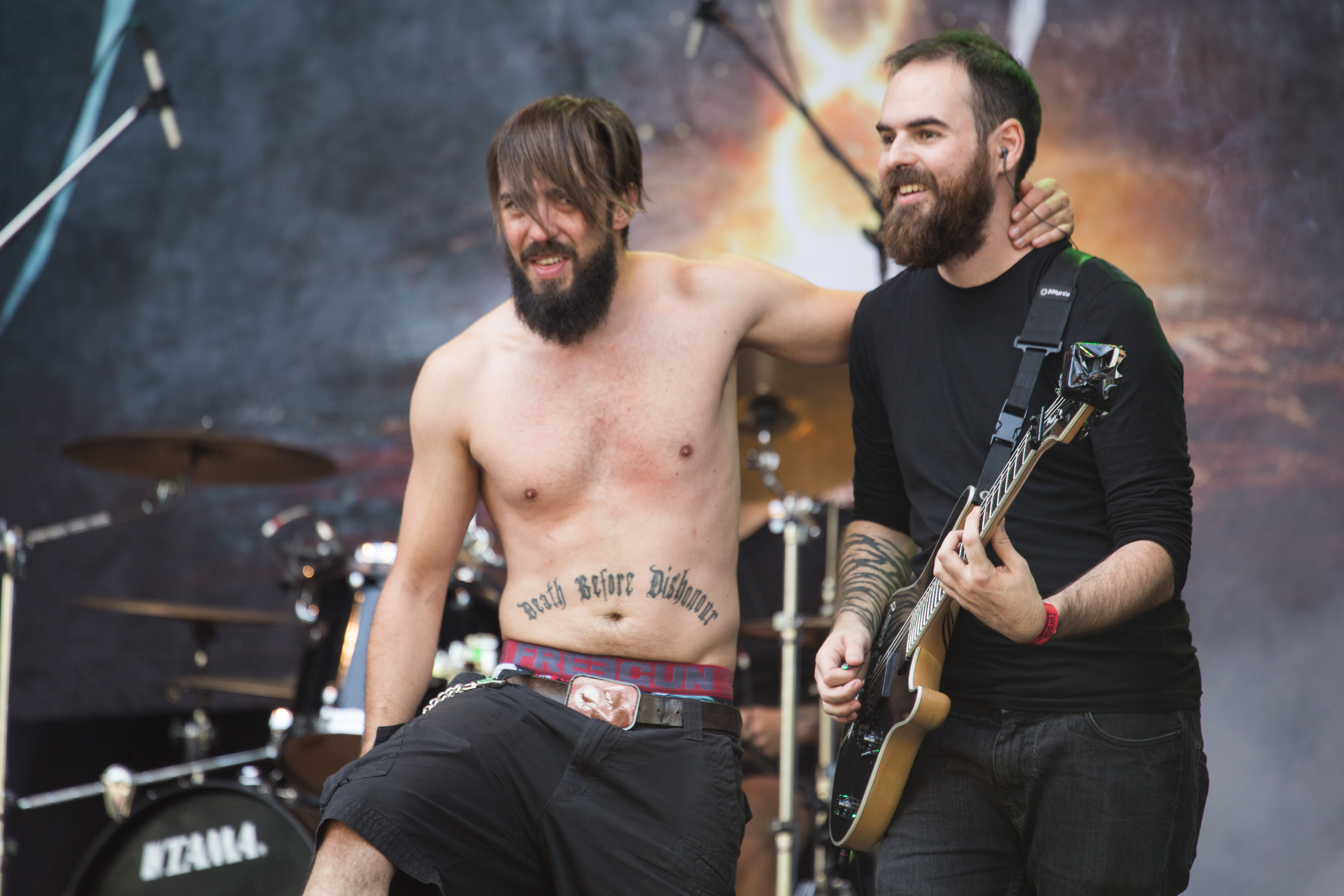
- Persefone at Turock Open Air 2015

Background information
- Origin: Andorra la Vella, Andorra
- Genres: Progressive metal, technical death metal, melodic death metal
- Years active: 2001–present
- Labels: ViciSolum, Napalm
- Members: Daniel Rodríguez Flys; Carlos Lozano Quintanilla; Filipe Baldaia; Miguel Espinosa Ortiz; Toni Mestre Coy; Sergi Verdeguer
- Past members: Aleix Dorca; Xavi Pérez; Marc Mas Marti; Jordi Gorgues Mateu; Marc Martins Pia
- Website: persefone.com

Persefone is an Andorran progressive death metal band formed in October 2001. Their name derives from Persephone, a Greek mythology figure.

== History ==
Persefone was founded in early 2001 in Andorra la Vella, Andorra. The founding members are Carlos Lozano Quintanilla, Jordi Gorgues Mateu, Toni Mestre Coy, and Xavi Pérez. Miguel Espinosa Ortiz joined in 2002.

A 2003 demo established the album's concept: five soul illnesses and the transition from life to death. With help from Claus Jensen and Intromental Management, a six-track demo became an LP. Truth Inside the Shades was recorded at Orion Studios and mastered by Peter in de Betou for Taylor Maid Productions.

Some shows were scheduled, but drummer Pérez left and was replaced with the band's producer, Aleix Dorca.

Marc Marti replaced Quintanilla as lead singer. After this, Truth Inside the Shades was released worldwide through Soundholic Records (Japan), Cd-Maximum (Russia and Baltic States), and Adipocere Records (Europe and United States).

The next, longer concept album tells the story of Persephone, the Greek goddess the band was named after. In August 2006, Core was released in Japan through Soundholic Records in August 2006. In 2007, Persefone signed with Greek label Burning Star Records, releasing the album worldwide in August.

In 2010, the band released the Japanese-influenced album Shin-Ken and supported Obituary on tour. Persefone's fourth record, Spiritual Migration, was released in 2013. On 5 August 2014, the band announced drummer Marc Mas had left on good terms.

Persefone's next album, Aathma, was released in February 2017.

On 22 February 2018, Persefone announced their new single, "In Lak'Ech", releasing it on 23 March with Tim Charles from Ne Obliviscaris. The title derives from a Mayan greeting meaning "I am another yourself" or "I am you, and you are me".

On 4 February 2022, Persefone released the album Metanoia, featuring guests Einar Solberg from Leprous, Steffen Kummerer, Angel Vivaldi and Merethe Soltvedt. The album received critical acclaim, with Metal Injection calling it "Fantastic" and SonicPerspectives saying the band had "outdone themselves".

On 12 September 2023, Persefone announced vocalist Marc Martins Pia was leaving to focus on family. On 17 October 2023, the band named Daniel R. Flys of Eternal Storm as his replacement. Their first release with Flys, the EP Lingua Ignota: Part I, was released on 2 February 2024.

== Musical style ==
Loudwire said that Persefone were a progressive death metal band. The band's music incorporates keyboards instruments, piano and acoustic guitar.

== Members ==
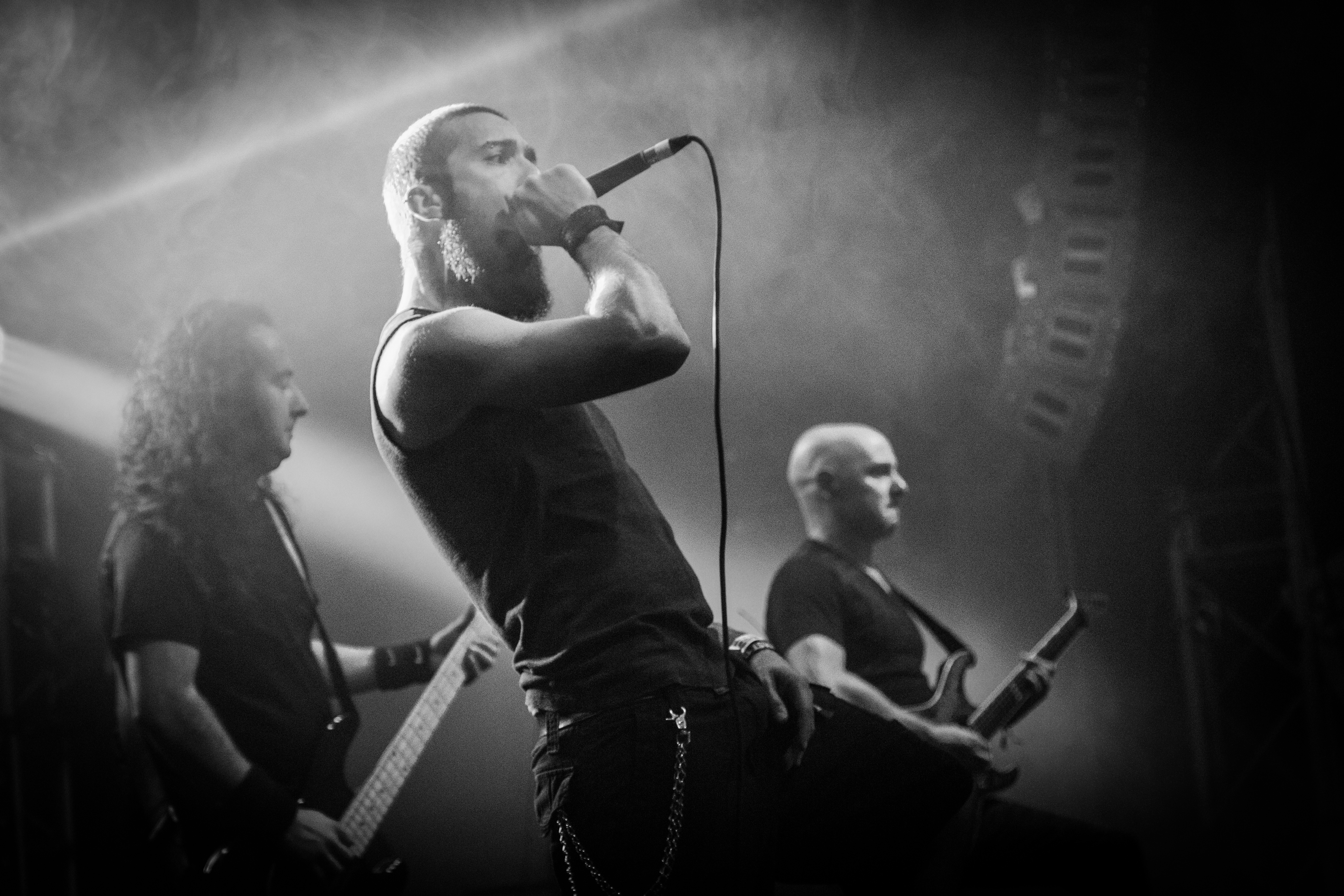
Persefone in 2015

Current

- Toni Mestre Coy – bass (2001–present)
- Carlos Lozano Quintanilla – guitar (2001–present), vocals (2001–2004)
- Miguel "Moe" Espinosa – keyboards, vocals (2002–present)
- Sergi Verdeguer – drums (2015–present)
- Filipe Baldaia – guitar (2016–present)
- Daniel R. Flys - vocals (2023-present)

Former

- Jordi Gorgues Mateu – guitar (2001–2016)
- Xavi Perez – drums (2001–2003)
- Aleix Dorca Josa – drums (2003–2006)
- Marc Mas Marti – drums (2006–2014)
- Marc Martins Pia – vocals (2004–2023)

Timeline

== Discography ==
Studio albums

- Truth Inside the Shades (2004, re-recorded in 2020)
- Core (2006)
- Shin-Ken (2009)
- Spiritual Migration (2013)
- Aathma (2017)
- Metanoia (2022)

Live

- Live in Andorra (2025)

EPs

- In Lak'Ech (2018)
- Lingua Ignota: Part I (2024)
