= Aathma =

Studio album by Persefone
- Released: 24 February 2017
- Recorded: September–November 2016 at Core Music Factory, Andorra
- Genre: Progressive metal, melodic death metal, extreme metal
- Length: 63:45
- Label: ViciSolum Productions
- Producer: Carlos Lozano Quintanilla, Moe Espinosa, Sergi Verdeguer

Persefone chronology
Spiritual Migration (2013)	Aathma (2017)	Metanoia (2022)

Professional ratings
Review scores
Source	Rating
AngryMetalGuy	4/5
Metal Injection	8/10
My Global Mind	9/10
New Noise	4/5 stars

Aathma is the fifth studio album by Andorran metal band Persefone. It was released on 24 February 2017 by label ViciSolum Productions.

== Track listing ==
All tracks are written by Persefone. Tracks 1 and 7 also written by Paul Masvidal

No.	Title	Length
1.	"An Infinitesimal Spark"	1:50
2.	"One of Many..."	1:27
3.	"Prison Skin"	6:21
4.	"Spirals Within Thy Being"	7:16
5.	"Cosmic Walkers"	3:22
6.	"No Face Mindless"	5:52
7.	"Living Waves"	5:45
8.	"Vacuum"	2:13
9.	"Stillness is Timeless"	9:36
10.	"Aathma": I. "Part I: Universal Oneness"; II. "Part II: Spiritual Bliss"; III. "Part III: One with the Light"; IV. "Part IV: ...Many of One"	20:03: 6:36; 4:06; 5:23; 3:58
Total length:		63:45

== Personnel ==
Persefone

- Marc Martins: vocals
- Carlos Lozano: guitars
- Miguel Espinosa: keyboards, vocals
- Tony Mestre: bass
- Sergi Verdeguer: drums
- Filipe Baldaia: guitars

Guest musicians

- Paul Masvidal (Cynic, Death): narration (track 1), guitars and vocals (track 7)
- Øystein Landsverk (Leprous): guitars (track 10, part 3)
- Merethe Soltvedt (Two Steps from Hell): vocals (track 10, parts 2 and 4)

Production

- Mixed and mastered by Jens Bogren (Katatonia, Opeth, Devin Townsend, Arch Enemy, Symphony X)
- Artwork by Travis Smith (Death, Nevermore, King Diamond, Anathema)
- Drums edited by Teddy Möller (Loch Vostok)
- Produced by Carlos Lozano Quintanilla, Moe Espinosa and Sergi Verdeguer
