= Darkness and Light (Keldian album) =

Studio album by Keldian
- Released: 27 October 2017
- Genre: Symphonic power metal
- Length: 52:14
- Label: Perris Records
- Producer: Keldian

Keldian chronology
Outbound (2013)	Darkness and Light (2017)

Darkness and Light is the fourth album by the Norwegian symphonic power metal band Keldian. It was released on 27 October 2017 via Perris Records.

== Track listing ==
All tracks are written by Keldian.

No.	Title	Length
1.	"Nightfall"	4:21
2.	"Blood Red Dawn"	5:11
3.	"The Haunting"	4:27
4.	"Life and Death Under Strange New Suns"	5:28
5.	"I'm the Last of Us"	12:41
6.	"Change the World"	7:20
7.	"Broadside!"	5:19
8.	"Crown of Starlight"	7:27
Total length:		52:14

== Credits ==
- Christer Andresen – lead vocals, guitars, bass
- Arild Aardalen – synthesizers, vocals

Additional Musicians

- Jørn Holen – drums
- Marit Lovise Rode – vocals
- Vemund Osland – guitar solo, co-solo
- Helene Hande Midje – backing vocals
- Hjalmar Sivertsen Frønningen – backing vocals
