= Necrowretch =

French death metal band

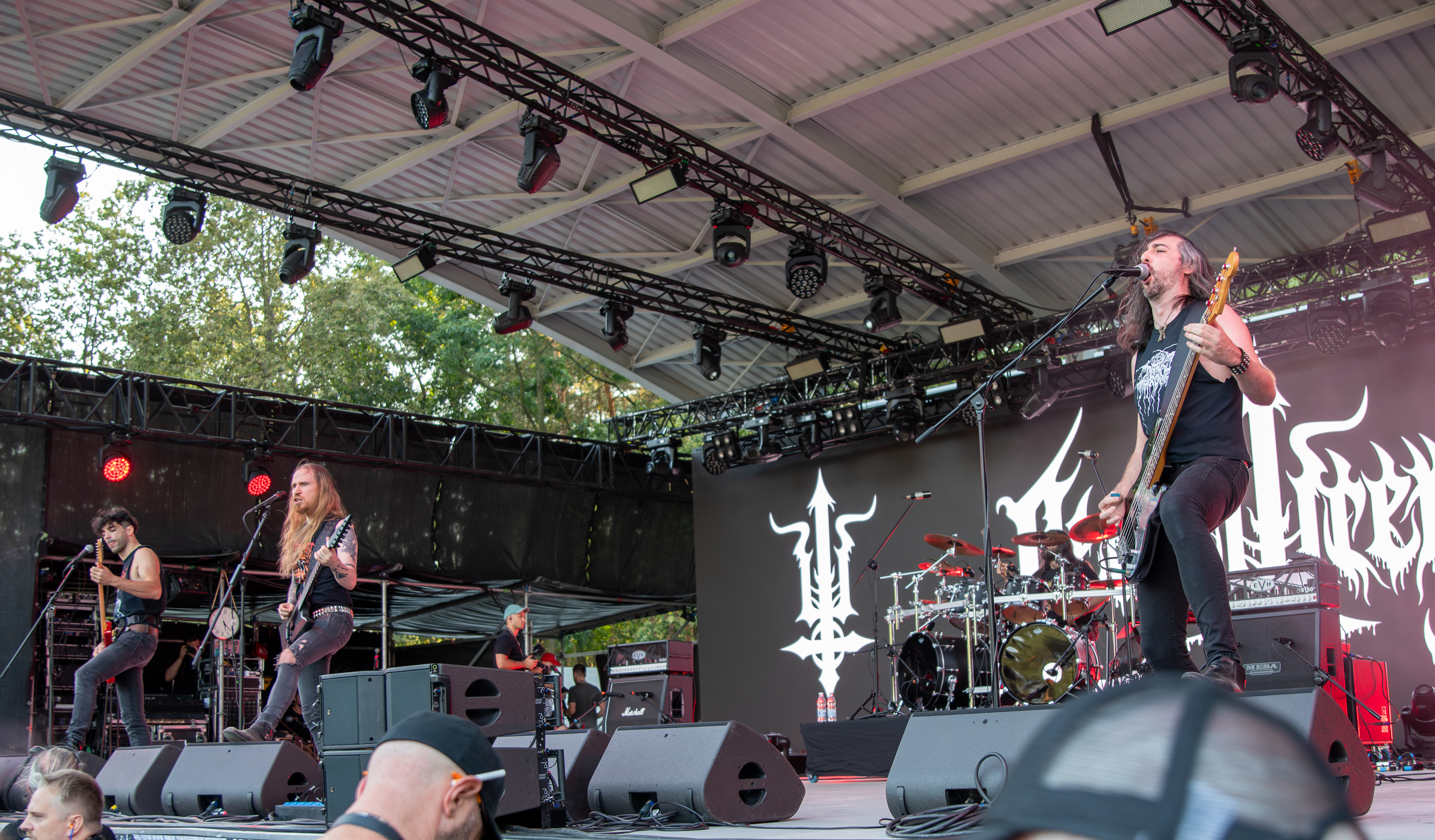
- Necrowretch in concert, 2024

Background information
- Origin: Valence, Rhône-Alpes
- Genres: Death metal; blackened death metal
- Years active: 2008–present
- Labels: Season of Mist; Century Media; Detest
- Members: Vlad; Ilmar Marti Uibo; K.Desecrator
- Past members: Blastphemator; Executor; Amphycion
- Website: necrowretch.net

Necrowretch is a French death metal band from Valence, Rhône-Alpes; formed in 2008. After recording demos through Skeleton Plague Records, Aural Offerings Records, and releasing 2 EPs through Detest Records; Necrowretch signed to Century Media Records on 6 February 2012.

== History ==
=== Foundation (2008–2012) ===
Necrowretch was formed in 2008 by guitarist Vlad with "the impure intention to play sadistic-gravecracking-possessed death metal". Vlad was joined by drummer Blastphemator and recorded their first demo "Rising from Purulence" after 3 rehearsals. Bassist Amphycion joined after seeing them play a gig, making the band a trio and then going on to record their second demo Necrollections in 2010. Their first EP, Putrefactive Infestation was released in 2011 on 12" vinyl containing 4 tracks. They then released a compilation; Ripping Souls of Sinners, followed by a second EP; Now You're in Hell, released on 7" vinyl consisting of two tracks and featuring a cover of Death's "Zombie Ritual". Blastphemator later left the band later in 2011 due to a "total lack of motivation".

=== Deal with Century Media, Putrid Death Sorcery and Bestial Rites 2009–2012 (2012–2014) ===
Before the release of their second EP, Necrowretch were signed to Century Media Records on 6 February 2012. Necrowretch began recording their first studio album in August 2012 with session drummer Mörkk. The album artwork and title were revealed on 5 December 2012 and Putrid Death Sorcery was released through Century Media Records on 28 January 2013 on CD, vinyl and digital download. Necrowretch then played live shows with touring drummer K Desecrator, who left the band on 14 June 2013 after playing at 7 shows. Necrowretch released a music video for "Putrid Death Sorcery" on 17 July 2013, with a compilation album being announced for release on 21 October 2013. Fans attending the Live Evil Festival in London were able to buy copies early from the band themselves. The cover artwork for the compilation album Bestial Rites 2009–2012, featuring the band's previous demo and EP material was revealed on 24 September 2013 and was released on 21 October in Europe and 5 November in North America through Century Media Records on CD and digital download.

=== New drummer, Even Death May Die and With Serpents Scourge (2014–2015) ===
In a post on their Facebook page, Necrowretch stated that Ilmar Marti Uibo would play all the 2014 shows and would be their drummer on the next album. On 16 September 2014 details were released of the EP Even Death May Die, which was limited to 500 7" vinyl copies, of which 400 were black vinyl and 100 were gold vinyl. The EP was released on 13 October 2014. The EP was slated as a "first taste" of Necrowretch's upcoming second studio album, With Serpents Scourge, which was released in February 2015. Necrowretch were also confirmed as being one of the bands in the lineup for Hellfest in June 2015. On 28 December 2014, Necrowretch posted a statement stating that With Serpents Scourge would be released on 16 February 2015. On 13 January 2015, the album details of With Serpents Scourge were revealed and the album is set to be released on CD, vinyl, and digital download. The track "Feast Off Their Doom" was also streamed on SoundCloud. On 20 January 2015, With Serpents Scourge was made available for pre-order.

=== Departure of Amphycion, deal with Season of Mist, Satanic Slavery, The Ones from Hell and Swords of Dajjal (2015–present) ===
Following the departure of Amphycion in August. the band announced they had signed with Season of Mist, with plans to release their third studio album in 2017. In May that year, the band announced they had begun recording their third studio album. In January 2017, the band premiered the first track from their third album, titled Satanic Slavery, which was released on 14 April 2017. Their fourth album, The Ones From Hell was released on 14 February 2020, on Season of Mist. A follow-up album, Swords of Dajjal, was released on 2 February 2024.

== Band members ==
Current

- Vlad – vocals, guitar (2008–present)
- W. Cadaver – lead guitar (2017–present)
- R. Cadaver – bass guitar (2021–present)
- N. Destroyer – drums (2020–present)

Former or touring and session

- Ilmar - drums (2013 - 2020)
- Blastphemator – drums (2009–2012)
- Mörkk – session drums (2012, 2013)
- K.Desecrator – live drums (2012–2013), bass (2016), guitar (2016–2019)
- Executor – live drums (2013)
- Amphycion – bass guitar (2009–2015)

== Discography ==
=== Studio albums ===
- Putrid Death Sorcery (2013)
- With Serpents Scourge (2015)
- Satanic Slavery (2017)
- The Ones from Hell (2020)
- Swords of Dajjal (2024)

=== Live albums ===
- Welcome to Your Funeral (2018)

=== Compilations ===
- Ripping Souls of Sinners (2011)
- Bestial Rites 2009–2012 (2013)

=== Demos ===
- Rising from Purulence (2009)
- Necrollections (2010)

=== EPs ===
- Putrefactive Infestation (2011)
- Now You're in Hell (2012)
- Even Death May Die (2014)
