= The four woes of Jesus =

Christian teaching in the Gospel of Luke

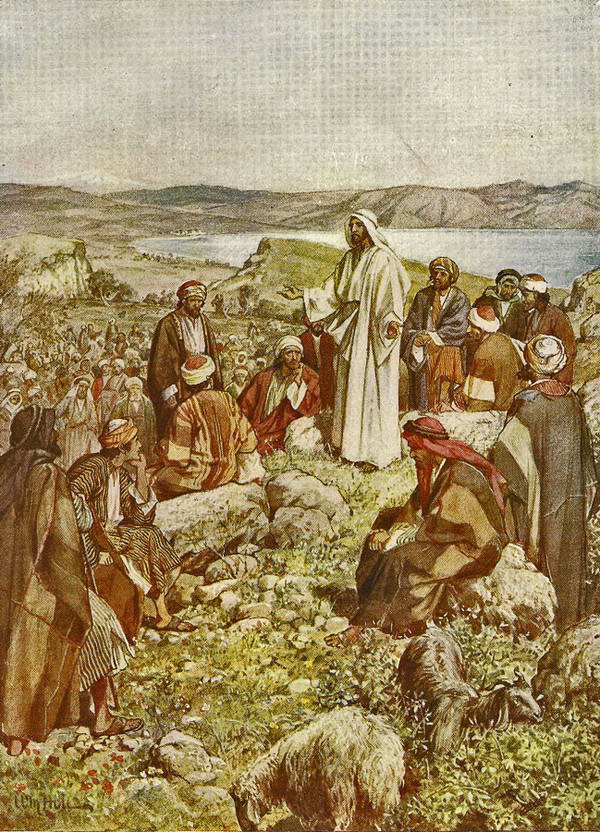
William Hole, The Sermon on the Mount

In the Gospel of Luke only, Jesus follows the beatitudes with a set of woes, denouncing the opposite to the blessings as the source of condemnation and punishment. These woes are universal and differ from the woes of the Pharisees.

== Scripture ==
‘But woe to you who are rich,
for you have received your consolation.
‘Woe to you who are full now,
for you will be hungry.
‘Woe to you who are laughing now,
for you will mourn and weep.

‘Woe to you when all speak well of you, for that is what their ancestors did to the false prophets.

— Luke 6:24-26, New Revised Standard Version

== Commentary ==
The sense of the word woe (Greek: Ου̉̀αὶ, Latin: væ) is commented on by a number of church fathers. John Chrysostom states that it is, "always said in the Scriptures to those who cannot escape from future punishment." St. Gregory likewise notes that it "oftentimes in Scripture denotes the wrath of God and everlasting punishment."

The woe of the rich, echoes the words from the Magnificat in Luke 1:53, "He hath filled the hungry with good things: and the rich he hath sent empty away." So also in the parable of the Rich man and Lazarus Jesus states that the rich, having received their consolation in this world, will have none in the next. Paul also speaks ill of wealth in 1 Timothy 6:10 (KJV), "for the love of money is the root of all evil".

In terms of being full, St. Basil writes, "to live for pleasure alone is to make a god of one’s stomach" (Phil. 3:19). St. Gregory writes that from the single vice of gluttony come innumerable others which fight against the soul. "Subdue this one vice, and you shall tame many others, because innumerable desires from lust, which follow gluttony. Even though they hold out the promise of enjoyment, they lead to everlasting misery."

Because of the woe of laughter, it was forbidden by St. Basil in his long rules, since "this is a life of penitence and sorrow, but the future one of joy and gladness." St. Augustine notes that "Christ is never said to have laughed, although He often wept." Cornelius a Lapide cites the Book of Sirach, writing, "mirth in moderation, however, is not forbidden to the followers of Christ. 'A fool lifteth up his voice with laughter; but a wise man doth scarce smile a little.' (Ecclus. 21:20, KJV), 'Laughter, I said, is madness. And what does pleasure accomplish?'" (Eccles. 2:2, NIV).

The final woe against being well spoken of, is against the former blessing promised to true prophets, who for the sake of the gospel suffer persecution (Luke 6:22). Likewise St. Paul writes, "For do I now persuade men, or God? or do I seek to please men? for if I yet pleased men, I should not be the servant of Christ." (Gal 1:10, KJV) Cornelius a Lapide notes, "he who preaches false doctrine and things pleasing to the carnal mind, causes his hearers to continue in wickedness and commit many sins, and therefore will receive greater damnation."

== See also ==
- The Law of Christ
- Woes of the Pharisees
- Sermon on the Mount
- Woes to the unrepentant cities
