= Hetroertzen =

Black metal band

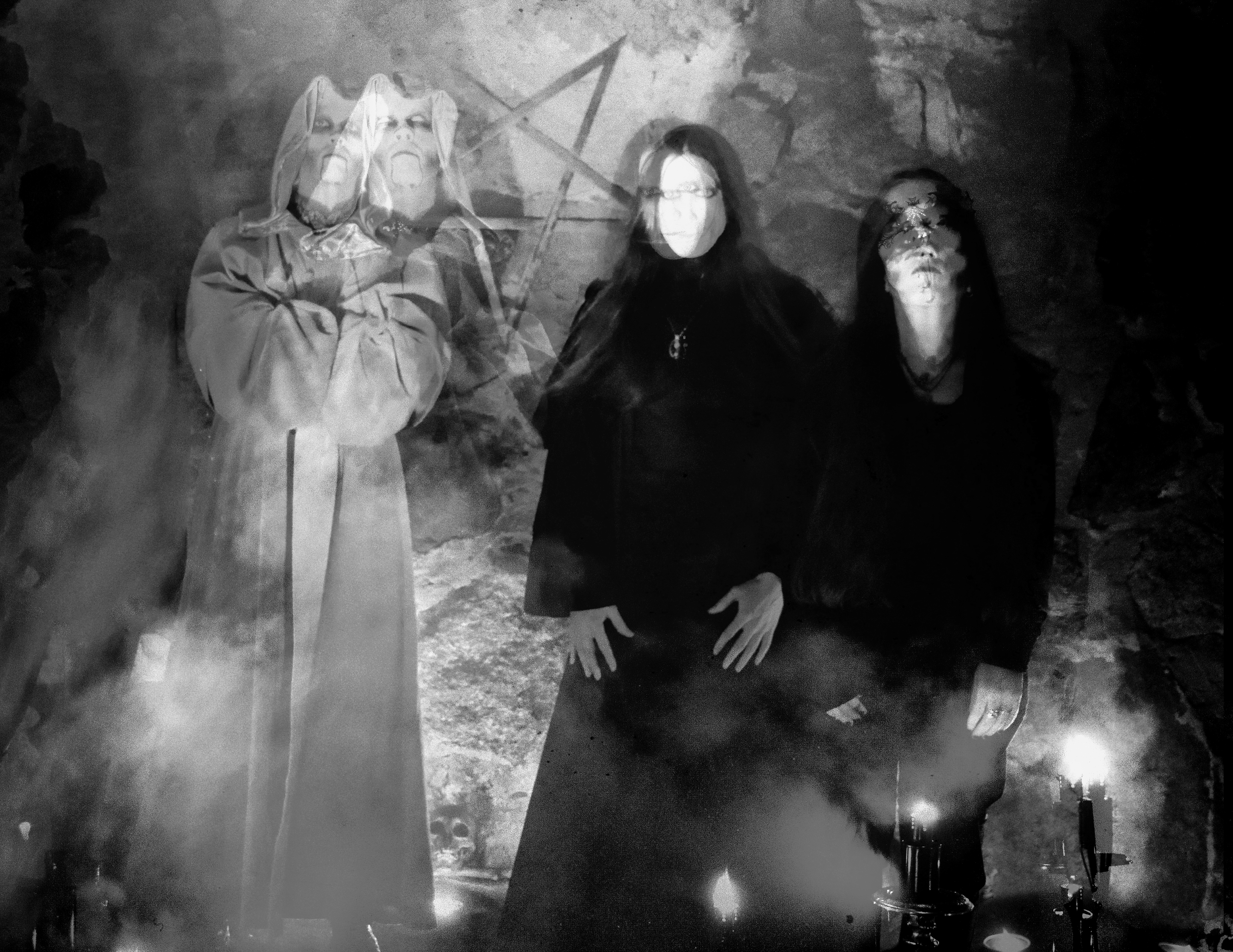
Hetroertzen Hetroertzen
- Origin: Puerto Varas, Chile
- Genres: Black metal
- Years active: 1997–present
- Labels: Lamech Records
- Members: Deacon D. Åskväder; Anubis
- Website: www.hetroertzen.se

Hetroertzen is a black metal band formed in 1997 by multi-instrumentalist Deacon D. The group originated in Puerto Varas, Chile and by 2009 had relocated to Västerås, Sweden.

== Biography ==
Initially a solo project, Deacon D. decided to make a full band and recruited guitarist Åskväder in September 1999. During their first ten years of existence, three albums were recorded and a handful of gigs were performed in their homeland of Chile. Various line-up changes occurred as well.

The band had a brief hiatus for various reasons, but in 2009 after resurfacing in Sweden and the city of Västerås, Hetroertzen's next full-length album Exaltation of Wisdom, was recorded. The line-up was then Deacon D. on drums, bass and vocals and Åskväder on guitars. Exaltation of Wisdom was at first released on LP in 2010 by Lamech Records and was limited to 500 blood-numbered copies. In November 2011 the group performed Exaltation of Wisdom in its entirety in their most important performance thus far, an event called Arosian Black Mass, where the band received highly positive critique from attendants. The band had the help from Kfzl on bass and Garghuf on drums. After their live debut at Arosian Black Mass, some line-up changes occurred, and Anubis joined as guitarist.

At the beginning of 2012 Frater D., Åskväder and Anubis went on to record new material for what would be used for a split album together with Norwegian band Dødsengel. The split, titled Capax Infiniti, was positively received by fans and sold well. In October 2013 the band went out on their first ever tour, alongside black metal acts Troll and Dødheimsgard. The tour was a success for the band and they won over new fans from all around Europe.

During 2014 Hetroertzen recorded material for a new full-length album. Ain Soph Aur was released in December 2014 receiving a great response from fans and the media. Ain Soph Aur was released on CD, vinyl and cassette through collaboration with Lamech Records, Terratur Possessions and Amor Fati Productions.

In the fall of 2015, Hetroertzen visited the US for the first time and performed two exclusive shows in New York City and Baltimore along with Ominous Resurrection and their brethren LvxCaelis. Also in 2015 the band confirmed to do their second European tour.

During 2016 Hetroertzen focused on the composition of their latest album 'Uprising of the Fallen' which was released in early 2017 by Listenable Records.

During 2017 the band performed various hand-picked live shows which included countries never conquered before. They also had a short tour in the summer throughout Germany, Belgium and The Netherlands.

At the beginning of 2018 the band returned to their homeland Chile to perform 7 exclusive dates along the country. Also in this year, their debut album 'Flying Across the Misty Gardens' was released by Lamech Records as a special anniversary edition reissue. Hetroertzen also managed to tour Europe in autumn together with LvxCaelis and Sektarism.

During 2019 and 2020 the band focused on the composition and recording of their new album.

At the end of 2021 the band parted ways with Ham and he was replaced by Kfzl, which was Hetroertzen´s former live bassist a decade ago.

Hetroertzen’s seventh album Phosphorus Vol I is now out and available worldwide. Released by Listenable Records.

== Discography ==
- Flying Across the Misty Gardens - (2002)
- A Crimson Terrible Vision - (2003)
- Rex Averno - (2005)
- Exaltation of Wisdom - (2010)
- Capax Infiniti (split with Dødsengel) - (2013)
- Ain Soph Aur - (2015)
- Uprising of the Fallen - (2017)
- Phosphorus Vol I - (2022)
