= Keldian =

Norwegian band

Background information
- Origin: Aurland Municipality, Sogn og Fjordane, Norway
- Genre: Symphonic power metal
- Years active: 2005—present
- Labels: Perris Records, Galactic Butterfly Music (self-release)
- Members: Christer Andresen; Arild Aardalen
- Website: www.keldian.com/

Keldian is a Norwegian power metal band, originating from Aurland Municipality in Sogn og Fjordane county, that made their debut in 2007 with the album Heaven's Gate. Their music is a blend of classic 1980s era melodic rock and more modern power and symphonic metal influences. Keldian is a studio project, with band members Christer Andresen and Arild Aardalen composing, producing and performing the music with the aid of hired session musicians.

== Biography ==
=== Pre-Keldian 1988-2004 ===
Andresen and Aardalen both grew up in the small Aurland Municipality, situated by an inner arm of the Sognefjord in Norway. Andresen started playing guitar at the age of 8 and spent many of his early years in the hard rock band Madam Curie. Later on he joined forces with keyboardist Aardalen for the first time in the electronica-inspired stage project Protos Nemesis. Madam Curie and Protos Nemesis then fused into the short-lived Alien Love Gardeners, a classic rock band that released an EP titled Cuts Shape The Man in 2000. When the band broke up Andresen and Aardalen re-worked this EP as a studio exercise. They called the project Keld and renamed the EP Salvation For The Guilty, and this soon formed the basis for Keldian.

Both the Salvation For The Guilty EP and earlier works by Protos Nemesis can be accessed through the "Hidden History" section on the official Keldian website.

=== Heaven's Gate and Journey of Souls 2005-2012 ===
Andresen and Aardalen both figured in a 2005 cover band project named Top Guns, which covered rock and pop classics from the 1980s in concert. It seems that this project, in addition to the Salvation For The Guilty EP, was the impetus to create Keldian the same year. Andresen and Aardalen recorded original demos in the summer of 2005 and the following winter. These pre-production demos were then taken into production and embellished into their debut album Heaven's Gate. The album was produced and engineered by Aardalen, who had by then become a professional sound engineer. Heaven's Gate was released through American label Perris Records in early 2007. The album had worldwide distribution, including a unique Japanese edition that featured a bonus track, and enjoyed brisk sales despite being the debut record of an unknown band. Fan favourites on the album include the metal anthem "Sundancer" and the dark ballad "Redshift".

The band's name is derived from the Old Norse word «kelde», which means outspring, source or well in English. The band would be inspired by science-fiction, spirituality and philosophy for their lyrics, and the band's name was chosen to reflect that the roots of the soul are intimately linked to human kind's ultimate destiny among the stars. Keldian would loosely mean "someone who comes from the source".

In May 2008, Keldian released their second album Journey of Souls, also through Perris Records, which received favourable reviews in many parts of the world. The band were praised for their original approach to the heavy metal genre, and also hailed as some of the genre's best lyricists, the latter exemplified by the war epic "Memento Mori".

In a September 2008 radio interview with the Norwegian Broadcasting Company, Aardalen hinted that the third Keldian album was in the planning stages. The writing and production of this album would be significantly prolonged, as Keldian split from their record label and built their own studio to have maximum flexibility and control over their operations and finances. The rights to the first two Keldian albums have reverted to the band, allowing them to distribute their music and merchandise directly to fans through their official website and Facebook profile. Their own label is listed as Galactic Butterfly Music, and all their music is available in their own Keldian album store.

=== Outbound 2013-2015 ===
On February 22, 2013, the band announced in a fan Q&A on their website that the third Keldian album would be titled Outbound. On February 26, 2013, Keldian launched a funding campaign on Indiegogo, asking for contributions to the production of Outbound, which was set with a tentative September 2013 release in the case of a successful campaign. On March 4, with the campaign going well, Keldian revealed the cover artwork for Outbound.

On August 27, 2013, the band revealed the Outbound track listing and running order in the blog on their website. They also confirmed that the album was entering the final mixing stages. Outbound was released on October 31, 2013.

=== Darkness and Light (2015–2022) ===
During early 2015 Keldian announced that they had started production on recording their fourth album. It was also confirmed that Jørn Holen would reprise his role of recording drums. On August 14, 2016, the band announced their next album, 'Darkness and Light' on their website, which was planned for release in 2017. They released their first single from the album called "Blood Red Dawn" on October 5, 2017. .

On October 27, 'Darkness and Light' was released digitally on all streaming services. The band comments on the name of the album "...Some of the lyrics had taken a darker emotional turn, and the yin and yang of the words led to the obvious album title: Darkness And Light."

=== The Bloodwater Rebellion (since 2022) ===
In June 2022 Keldian released their fifth album "The Bloodwater Rebellion" which is focusing around themes of environmental exploitation and fighting back against it.

== Studio collaborators and the possibility of live shows ==
Keldian's most frequent collaborator is drummer Jørn Steingrim Holen, who is best known for his work in the black metal outfits Windir and Vreid. He has performed on all of Keldian's albums. Journey of Souls featured several more session musicians, most prominently drummer Per Hillestad, who is known for his many years of studio and live work with Norwegian and international artists such as a-ha.

There has been no Keldian live shows thus far, seemingly a consequence of the band's inception as a studio project. Andresen and Aardalen have stated in several interviews that their priority is to create a handful of albums before possibly turning their attention to touring. Aardalen has also commented that Keldian live shows are very unlikely, since the whole premise of Keldian "has always just been about me and Chris writing music together." The only confirmed live material featuring Andresen and Aardalen consists of recordings made of their previous band Alien Love Gardeners, but these are extremely difficult to come by. Andresen has said that these recordings might be made available through the Keldian website at some point.

== Band members and associated musicians ==
Keldian:

- Christer Andresen - Lead vocals, Guitars, Bass
- Arild Aardalen - Synthesizers, Vocals

Featuring, among others:

- Jørn Holen (Vreid, Windir) - Drums
- H-man (LA Guns, The Black Crowes) - Drums
- Per Hillestad (Lava, a-ha) - Drums
- Maja Svisdahl - Vocals
- Anette Fodnes - Vocals
- Gunhild Mathea Olaussen - Violin

== Discography ==
- Heaven's Gate (2007)
- Journey of Souls (2008)
- Outbound (2013)
- Darkness and Light (2017)
- The Bloodwater Rebellion (2022)
