= Woe (band) =

American black metal band

- Origin: Philadelphia, Pennsylvania, United States
- Genres: Black metal
- Years active: 2007–present
- Labels: Vendetta Records
- Members: Chris Grigg; Matt Mewton; John McKinney; Michael Kadnar
- Past members: Ben Brand; Ruston Grosse; Evan Madden; Shane Madden; Lev Weinstein; Grzesiek Czapla
- Website: woeunholy.com

Woe is an American black metal band formed in 2007 in Philadelphia.

== History ==
Woe began in 2007 as a solo project of Chris Grigg, who wrote and recorded the Absinthe Invocation demo as well as a split 7" with Infernal Stronghold. In 2008, Stronghold Records released A Spell for the Death of Man, a full-length album again written and recorded entirely by Grigg. Over the next two years, Grigg recruited additional musicians—including Evan Madden (drums) and Shane Madden (bass) of Woods of Ypres—to perform live shows and write new songs. Woe signed to Candlelight Records in 2010 and released their follow-up album Quietly, Undramatically. In 2011 came a tour of the U.S. west coast and a tour with Mayhem. 2011 and 2012 also brought lineup changes, including the departure of Evan Madden and Shane Madden and their replacement with Ruston Grosse on drums and Grzesiek Czapla on bass guitar. Their third album, Withdrawal, was released by Candlelight Records on April 23, 2013 followed by tours of the United States and Europe.

== Reception ==
The A.V. Club called Woe "[o]ne of the best of a strong wave of young American black metal bands willing to play around with the boundaries of the genre" and "a group to watch out for". About Quietly, Undramatically, MetalSucks said "the band have managed to craft something that gives you a good sense of the possibilities STILL existent in the genre" and "[T]his is the sound of black metal to come" while Decibel praised its "sophistication without falling into the usual pitfalls of pretentiousness, cartoonish-ness or undue gloss". While discussing the lineup changes between albums, Pitchfork stated that Quietly, Undramatically "felt undecided, as though Grigg was trying to figure out how to use a full band now that he actually had one" but praised the newest lineup on Withdrawal. With the release of their A Violent Dread EP, Decibel called them "one of the most highly respected names in American black metal."

Blabbermouth.net gave A Spell for the Death of Man a rating of 6.5/10. AllMusic gave Quietly, Undramatically a rating of 3.5/5. Withdrawal earned a rating of 9/10 from Exclaim! and 8/10 from Pitchfork.

== Personnel ==
- Chris Grigg – guitar and vocals
- John McKinney – bass guitar
- Michael Kadnar – drums
- Matt Mewton – guitar

== Discography ==
- Absinthe Invocation: Five Spells Against God (self-released, 2007)
- Split 7" with Infernal Stronghold (2007)
- A Spell for the Death of Man (Stronghold Records, 2008)
- Quietly, Undramatically (Candlelight Records, 2010)
- Withdrawal (Candlelight Records, 2013)
- Hope Attrition (Vendetta Records, 2017)
- A Violent Dread EP (Vendetta Records, 2019)
- Legacies of Frailty (Vendetta Records, 2023)
