= Mindmaze =

MindMaze
- Origin: Allentown, Pennsylvania, United States
- Genres: Progressive metal, power metal, heavy metal
- Years active: 2012–present
- Label: Inner Wound Recordings (2014–present)
- Members: Sarah Teets; Jeff Teets; Rich Pasqualone
- Past members: Kalin Schweizerhof
- Website: www.mindmazeband.com

MindMaze is an American progressive power metal band from Allentown, Pennsylvania. Founded in 2012 by siblings Sarah Teets and Jeff Teets, the band also includes bassist Rich Pasqualone and drummer Mark "Truk" Bennett.

MindMaze has performed in 18 different U.S. States and toured with Saxon, Armored Saint and Iris Divine. Their first album, Mask of Lies, sold in 34 out of 50 states in the United States and in 17 countries through independent funding. Their second album, Back From The Edge, was released via Inner Wound Recordings and features Symphony X bassist Michael Lepond and guest appearances by members of Stratovarius, Pharaoh, Lord, and Draekon. Their third album, Resolve, was released in 2017.

== Musical style ==
MindMaze draws influences from Iron Maiden, Dream Theater, Fates Warning, Queensrÿche, Riot V, Savatage, Dio, Black Sabbath, Kansas, Rush, Avantasia, Evergrey, Gamma Ray, Thin Lizzy, UFO, Saxon, and Symphony X.

== Personnel ==
=== Current members ===
- Sarah Teets – lead vocals
- Jeff Teets – guitars, keyboards, backing vocals
- Rich Pasqualone – bass, backing vocals
- Mark "Truk" Bennett – drums

=== Past members ===
- Kalin Schweizerhof

== Discography ==
Mask of Lies
Release Date: February 17, 2013

1. Never Look Back
2. Breaking the Chains
3. This Holy War
4. Cosmic Overture
5. Fading Skies
6. Mask of Lies
7. Dark City
8. Remember
9. Destiny Calls

Back From the Edge
Release Date: October 24, 2014

1. Back from the Edge
2. Through the Open Door
3. Moment of Flight
4. Dreamwalker
5. The Machine Stops
6. Consequence of Choice
7. End of Eternity
8. Onward (Destiny Calls II)

Dreamwalker (EP)
Release Date: July 20, 2015

1. Dreamwalker
2. Arena of Pleasure (W.A.S.P cover)
3. Slave to the Cycle
4. Promises in the Dark (Pat Benatar cover)
5. Remember (acoustic)
6. Strange Wings (Savatage cover)
7. Dreamwalker (Duet Version featuring Urban Breed)

Resolve
Release Date: April 28, 2017

1. Reverie
2. Fight the Future
3. In This Void
4. Drown Me
5. Sign of Life
6. Abandon
7. Sanity's Collapse
8. One More Moment
9. Twisted Dream
10. True Reflection
11. Shattered Self
12. Release
13. The Path to Perseverance

== Awards ==
- Lehigh Valley Music Awards 2019 - BEST METAL BAND
- Lehigh Valley Music Awards 2015 - BEST METAL BAND
- WZZO Mötley Crüe Contest - WINNERS
- WZZO Backyard Bands 2013 - Runner-Up
- Reddit /r/ Power Metal - WINNER: Best Debut Album of 2013
- When Prog and Power Unite - WINNER: Album of the Year 2013
