= Woes of the Pharisees =

Criticisms of the Pharisees by Jesus

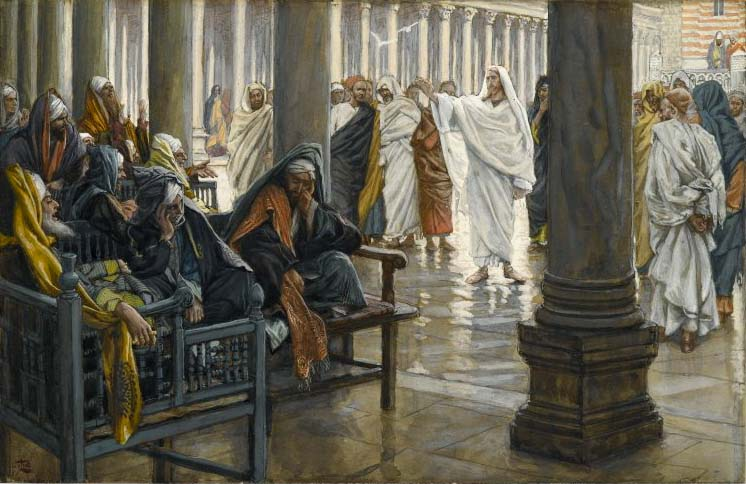
James Tissot, Woe unto You, Scribes and Pharisees, Brooklyn Museum

The Woes of the Pharisees are series of criticisms by Jesus against scribes and Pharisees recorded in Luke 11:37–54 and Matthew 23:1–39. Mark 12:35–40 and Luke 20:45–47 also include warnings about scribes.

Eight are listed in Matthew, and hence Matthew's version is known as the eight woes. These are found in Matthew 23 verses 13–16, 23, 25, 27 and 29. Only six are given in Luke, whose version is thus known as the six woes: three are directed to the Pharisees and three to the scribes. The woes mostly criticise the Pharisees for hypocrisy and perjury. They illustrate the differences between inner and outer moral states.

== Context and background ==
The woes are mentioned twice in the narratives in the Gospels of Matthew and Luke. In Matthew they are mentioned after Jesus' triumphal entry into Jerusalem, where he teaches in the Temple, while in Luke they are mentioned after the Lord's Prayer is given and the disciples are first sent out over the land. Before introducing the woes, Matthew states that Jesus criticized them for taking the place of honor at banquets, for wearing ostentatious clothing, and for encouraging people to call them rabbi.

The woes are all woes of hypocrisy and illustrate the differences between inner and outer moral states. Jesus portrays the Pharisees as practicing outward, ritual observance of minutiae which made them look acceptable and virtuous outwardly but left the inner person unreformed.

== The seven woes ==
The seven woes are:

1. They taught about God, but did not love God: they did not enter the kingdom of heaven themselves, nor did they let others enter.
2. They preached God but converted people to dead religion.
3. They taught that an oath sworn by the temple or altar was not binding, but that if sworn by the gold ornamentation of the temple, or by a sacrificial gift on the altar, it was binding. The gold and gifts, however, were not sacred in themselves as the temple and altar were but derived a measure of lesser sacredness by being connected to the temple or altar. The teachers and Pharisees worshiped at the temple and offered sacrifices at the altar because they knew that the temple and altar were sacred. How then could they deny oath-binding value to what was truly sacred and accord it to objects of trivial and derived sacredness?
4. They taught the law but did not practice some of the most important parts of the law: justice, mercy, faithfulness to God. They obeyed the minutiae of the law such as tithing spices but not the weightier matters of the law.
5. They presented an appearance of being 'clean' (self-restrained, not involved in carnal matters), but they were dirty inside: they seethed with hidden worldly desires and carnality. They were full of greed and self-indulgence.
6. They exhibited themselves as righteous on account of being scrupulous keepers of the law but were, in fact, not righteous: their mask of righteousness hid a secret inner world of ungodly thoughts and feelings. They were full of wickedness. They were like whitewashed tombs (in the King James Version, whited sepulchres), beautiful on the outside, but full of dead men's bones.
7. They professed a high regard for the dead prophets of old and claimed that they would never have persecuted and murdered prophets when, in fact, they were cut from the same cloth as the persecutors and murderers: they too had murderous blood in their veins.

== See also ==
- If the world hates you
- The Law of Christ
- Physician, heal thyself
- The four woes of Jesus
- Letter and spirit of the law
