= 2012 in heavy metal music =

This is a timeline documenting the events of heavy metal in the year 2012.

== Bands disbanded ==
- A Plea for Purging
- Ajattara
- Anterior
- Averse Sefira
- Blind Witness
- The Carrier
- Cathedral
- The Crimson Armada
- Dead and Divine
- Decadence
- Defiance
- Elis
- Heavy Heavy Low Low
- Hevein
- In the Midst of Lions
- Massacration
- Nahemah
- Norther
- One Man Army and the Undead Quartet
- The Tony Danza Tapdance Extravaganza
- Underoath
- Unearthly Trance

== Bands formed ==
- Amorphia
- Dayseeker
- Infant Annihilator
- Khemmis
- Polaris
- The Skull
- Slugdge
- Wytch Hazel

== Bands reformed ==
- Broken Hope
- Byzantine
- Coal Chamber
- Confide
- Eternal Oath
- Extol
- Malice
- The Obsessed
- Otyg
- Riot
- Sonic Syndicate

== Events ==
- On January 4, American metalcore act Killswitch Engage have decided to continue without Howard Jones (ex-Blood Has Been Shed). On February 6, the band announced that original singer Jesse Leach has taken Jones' place.
- On January 9, it was announced that Black Sabbath guitarist Tony Iommi has been diagnosed with lymphoma. However, the band have stated that they will continue recording their new album. Within a month, the band announced that drummer Bill Ward has decided to leave the band.
- Singaporean grindcore act Wormrot were detained in Malaysia by the Selangor Islamic Religious Department. The reasoning for their arrest was "it is wrong for unmarried Muslim men and women to be in [the same] room."
- Cryptopsy announced their new bassist is Olivier Pinard (Neuraxis).
- After 16 years with the band, Anvil bassist Glenn Gyorffy (aka Glen Five) leaves the band to "broaden [his] horizons".
- Graveworm announced the return of founding member/guitarist Stefan Unterpertinger after a 10-year absence.
- Warbringer announced the departure of founding member/guitarist Adam Carroll, and his replacement as Andrew Bennett.
- After previously working with the band, Byron Stroud (Fear Factory, Strapping Young Lad) announced he is joining 3 Inches of Blood as their new permanent bassist.
- Founding member/guitarist of crossover thrash act D.R.I., Spike Cassidy, was rushed to the hospital due to complications with a colectomy.
- The Haunted founding member/vocalist Peter Dolving abruptly departs from the band via Facebook. On October 16, founding lead guitarist Anders Björler leaves the band for the second time along with drummer Per Möller Jensen.
- Death metal band Suffocation parted ways with founding drummer Mike Smith due to musical differences.
- Christopher Amott, founding guitarist/vocalist leaves Arch Enemy because "Christopher simply isn't into playing extreme metal anymore."
- Brazilian Metal Open Air festival takes place, but is cancelled after severe logistical and financial problems.
- Michael Keene of technical death metal band The Faceless announced through Twitter that founding guitarist Steve Jones has departed from the band. This leaves Keene as the only original member left. Wes Hauch will be filling Steve's spot as the newest member.
- The Sonisphere Festival in Knebworth, UK was cancelled due to their weak economy.
- Mikael Åkerfeldt (Opeth) quits Bloodbath due to lack of interest in the death metal scene.
- Threat Signal announced the departure of drummer Alex Rüdinger due to his interest to pursue other projects.
- Slayer have announced that Jeff Hanneman will me taking more time off from the band to concentrate on his rehabilitation. Back in 2011, Jeff contracted necrotizing fasciitis (flesh-eating disease) on his right arm from a spider bite, and has been struggling in recovery since then. Gary Holt (Exodus) will continue to fill Jeff's spot until he is well enough to return. Slayer said "How long will that be? The best and most honest answer we can give you is 'as long as it takes.'"
- Dark Funeral signed a three album record deal with Century Media Records.
- Drummer Patrice Hamelin of Canadian death metal band Martyr has quit the band. "Martyr is on hold for now."
- Marduk were banned from Minsk, Belarus. "Pavel Radzivonaw, a departmental head at the Prosecutor General's Office, told reporters on Monday that Marduk's concert, scheduled for May 22, would not take place. 'The band preaches Satanism, which has nothing to do with art,' he says. 'This is an affront to Christian values, they preach the ideas of death, of the Third Reich.'"
- Angra vocalist Edu Falaschi announced his departure from the band. Bassist Felipe Andreoli also announced his departure from Almah.
- Iron Maiden's 1982 album The Number of the Beast won 9.2% of the 30,000 votes cast in the UK for their favorite British album of the past 60 years.
- Sonic Syndicate's founding member/guitarist Roger Sjunnesson quits the band.
- Queensrÿche parts ways with founding member/vocalist Geoff Tate. The band also announced Crimson Glory singer Todd La Torre hired as his replacement.
- Kamelot announced their new vocalist as Tommy Karevik (Seventh Wonder).
- Guitarist Liem N'Guyen leaves Benighted after 14 years with the band. His replacement is said to be Adrien Guerin.
- Peter Wichers leaves Soilwork again due to "musical differences".
- Atheist announced the return of bassist Tony Choy.
- Lamb of God vocalist Randy Blythe was arrested on June 28, 2012, by Czech Police for causing a fan's death by pushing him off stage in Prague, Czech Republic. The band's publicists, have stated that Blythe is "wrongfully accused". Blythe was released on bail for 4,000,000 Czech Koruna (US$200,000), and has been held in the country because he was "considered a flight risk by the judge". Blythe posted bail, but due to the prosecutor's complaint, his bail was doubled to 8,000,000 Czech Koruna (US$400,000). Due to his jail-time being longer than expected, Lamb of God's tour with Dethklok and Gojira was cancelled. On August 3 Randy was released from prison after 5 weeks, Lamb of God was confirmed for Knotfest.
- Frontman/guitarist Alexi Laiho of Children of Bodom was rushed to the hospital with stomach pains. He was released July 11 to continue the rest of the tour.
- The frontman/guitarist Josef "Humanoid" Vesely of death metal band !T.O.O.H.! was diagnosed with Schizophrenia.
- Blood Stain Child parts ways with female vocalist Sophia Aslanidou. In December she is replaced by Kiki, "What makes her so unique and talented is to be able to handle both clean voice and scream voice."
- Dagoba guitarist Izakar leaves the band due to "musical differences" and to focus on his other project Blazing War Machine.
- Nuclear Blast "quit the copyright case" against 80 alleged file-sharers for sharing the All Shall Perish album "This Is Where It Ends". The label went ahead with the charges without the band's permission.
- Ministry front-man Al Jourgensen collapsed on stage during a live performance. The doctors said, "he was examined by numerous physicians and diagnosed to have had a full-system collapse due to extreme dehydration and heat exhaustion intensified by the lack of ventilation on stage at the venue. Doctors confirm via blood tests conducted that Jourgensen's alcohol blood levels were well below normal and no narcotics were found in his system." The remainder of the weeks tour dates were canceled, until Al was feeling well enough to continue the "DeFiBriLlaTouR European tour".
- Baroness were caught in a terrible bus accident, where the bus fell 30 feet from a viaduct near Bath. A Facebook page statement was released as follows, "The band members of Baroness and their crew are recovering from injuries sustained after their tour bus crashed outside of Bath England early on Wednesday morning. John Baizley has broken his left arm and left leg. Allen Blickle and Matt Maggioni each suffered fractured vertebrae. All three remain in the hospital as of this writing. Pete Adams has been treated and released from the hospital. Three of the five crew members who were on the bus have also been treated and released. One member is still undergoing testing."
- Anthrax's song "Got The Time" was the first heavy metal song played on the planet Mars. The song "was one of several songs on NASA's wake-up playlist for the Mars Rover, Curiosity, that touched down on the Red Planet August 5th."
- Decapitated drummer Kerim "Krimh" Lechner quits the band due to "personal differences".
- Eluveitie lead guitarist Simeon Koch leaves the band after 8 years. Rafael Salzmann will be his replacement for live performances.
- Hydra Head Records has indefinitely closed its doors.
- Nightwish lead singer Anette Olzon parts ways with the band after 5 years. Floor Jansen (ex-After Forever) will replace her for the remainder of the band's Imaginaerum World Tour.
- Gwar announces their newest lead guitarist Pustulus Maximus on October 1.
- Metallica announces the launch of their own record label "Blackened Recordings", and have taken ownership of all their previous mastered tracks.
- Megadeth end their contract with Roadrunner Records after 5 years and 3 albums.
- On November 9, 2012, Amberian Dawn announced on their official site, that they are parting ways with singer Heidi Parviainen, along with drummer Heikki Saari and guitarist Kasperi Heikkinen. The replacement members are new vocalist Päivi "Capri" Virkkunen, and ex-members Joonas Pykälä-aho (drums) and Emil "Emppu" Pohjalainen (guitar). Parviainen explained via Facebook, "Early this year we noticed that we had reached the point where we didn't have much to offer to each other any more, and my own ambitions and Amberian Dawn's goals weren't coinciding any longer."

== Deaths ==
- January 3 – Joseph G. "Joey "Fingers" Lombard, former bassist of Incantation, died by suicide at the age of 42.
- January 5 – Nicole Bogner, former vocalist of Visions of Atlantis, died from an undisclosed disease at the age of 27.
- January 14 – Robbie France, former drummer of Diamond Head, UFO and Wishbone Ash, died from a ruptured aorta at the age of 52.
- January 25 – Mark Reale, guitarist and founding member of Riot, died from complications with Crohn's disease at the age of 57.
- February 9 – Herbert Dreger, former drummer of Holy Moses, died of heart failure at the age of 44.
- February 13 – Tommi Kristian "Tonmi" Lillman, drummer of Lordi (known as "Otus") and former drummer of Ajattara (known as "Malakias IV"), To/Die/For, and Sinergy, died from undisclosed reasons at the age of 38.
- February 15 – Hans Jørgen Andersen, former guitarist of Mercenary, died from undisclosed reasons at the age of 36.
- March 3 – Ronnie Montrose, guitarist and leader of Montrose and Gamma, died from a self-inflicted gunshot wound at the age of 64.
- April 5 – James Charles "Jim" Marshall OBE, drummer and founder of Marshall Amplification, died at the age of 88.
- April 10 – Richie Teeter, drummer of the Dictators and former drummer of Twisted Sister, died from esophageal cancer at the age of 61.
- April 21 – Rob Cranny (a.k.a. Balfabar Nosugref the Almighty), owner of Canadian Northern Storm Records and vocalist of Detsörgsekälf, died from a heart attack at the age of 27.
- May 4 – Rob Doherty, former guitarist and vocalist of Into Eternity, died from undisclosed reasons at the age of 41.
- May 13 – Trond "Trondr Nefas" Bråthen, also known as "Alastor Nefas" and "Nefas", founder, vocalist, multi-instrumentalist and songwriter of Urgehal, died from undisclosed reasons at the age of 34.
- May 20 – Steeve Hurdle, former guitarist of Gorguts, died of post-surgical complications at the age of 41.
- May 31 – Michael Grant, singer of Crescent Shield, Onward, Legend Maker and Cypher Seer, died of unidentified illness at the age of 39.
- June 4 – George Marino, Grammy Award-winning mastering engineer of thousands of albums by numerous artists in a wide array of genres, including Metallica, Testament, Anthrax, Dio, Sepultura, Dream Theater, and Ozzy Osbourne, among others, died from lung cancer at the age of 65.
- June 29 – Teddy Mueller, former drummer of AXE, died from undisclosed reasons at the age of 57.
- July 16 – John Douglas "Jon" Lord, composer, founding member and former keyboardist of Deep Purple and former keyboardist of Whitesnake, died from a pulmonary embolism after a battle with pancreatic cancer at the age of 71.
- August 12 – Bill Kennedy, record engineer and producer of numerous artists, including Megadeth, Deep Purple, Morbid Angel, Testament, Nine Inch Nails, and Danzig, died from undisclosed reasons at the age of 49.
- November 1 – Mitch Lucker, singer of Suicide Silence, died from a motorcycle accident at the age of 28.
- December 8 – Huw Lloyd-Langton, guitarist of Hawkwind and the Meads of Asphodel, died from cancer at the age of 61.
- December 22 – Michael Ralph "Mike" Scaccia, founding member and guitarist of Rigor Mortis and guitarist of Ministry and Revolting Cocks, collapsed onstage while performing as part of a 50th birthday celebration for Rigor Mortis singer Bruce Corbitt and died shortly afterwards from a heart attack at the age of 47.

== Albums released ==
=== January ===
Day	Artist	Album
4	Kayo Dot	Gamma Knife
6	Alcest	Les Voyages de l'Âme
9	Wolfsbane	Wolfsbane Save the World
11	Skylark	Twilights of Sand
13	This Ending	Systematic Worship (EP)
17	Attack Attack!	This Means War
20	Biohazard	Reborn in Defiance
20	Primal Fear	Unbreakable
20	Nothnegal	Decadence
23	Aborted	Global Flatline
23	Savage Messiah	Plague of Conscience
23	Sear Bliss	Eternal Recurrence
24	Abigail Williams	Becoming
24	Beyond the Bridge	The Old Man and the Spirit
24	Lacuna Coil	Dark Adrenaline
24	Lamb of God	Resolution
24	Opera IX	Strix Maledictae in Aeternum
25	Witchmaster	Śmierć (EP)
27	Blind Guardian	Memories of a Time to Come (compilation)
27	Iron Fire	Voyage of the Damned
27	Suicidal Angels	Bloodbath
30	Woods of Ypres	Woods 5: Grey Skies & Electric Light
31	Astral Doors	Jerusalem
31	Azaghal	Nemesis
31	Bleeding Through	The Great Fire
31	Cadaveria	Horror Metal
31	Liberteer	Better to Die on Your Feet Than Live on Your Knees
31	Ram	Death

=== February ===
Day	Artist	Album
1	Muluc Pax	Suut Ki'in
1	Swallow the Sun	Emerald Forest and the Blackbird
3	Caliban	I Am Nemesis
6	Chimp Spanner	All Roads Lead Here (EP)
6	Therapy?	A Brief Crack of Light
7	Psycroptic	The Inherited Repression
8	Stam1na	Nocebo
10	Dunderbeist	Black Arts & Crooked Tails
10	Eluveitie	Helvetios
10	Engel	Songs for the Dead (EP)
10	Goatwhore	Blood for the Master
13	Coldworker	The Doomsayer's Call
13	Orange Goblin	A Eulogy for the Damned
14	Avatar	Black Waltz
14	Beneath the Massacre	Incongruous
14	Dawn of Ashes	Farewell to the Flesh (EP)
14	Earth	Angels of Darkness, Demons of Light II
14	Isis	Live VI (live album)
14	Wykked Wytch	The Ultimate Deception
17	Ektomorf	The Acoustic
18	Kryptos	The Coils of Apollyon
20	Autopsy	All Tomorrow's Funerals (EP)
21	Buckethead	Electric Sea
22	Hypno5e	Acid Mist Tomorrow
22	Xandria	Neverworld's End
24	Desaster	The Arts of Destruction
24	Drudkh	Eternal Turn of the Wheel
24	Freedom Call	Land of the Crimson Dawn
24	Halloween	Terrortory
24	Lanfear	This Harmonic Consonance
24	Lyriel	Leverage
24	Rage	21
24	Terrorizer	Hordes of Zombies
24	Vengeance	Crystal Eye
27	Asphyx	Deathhammer
27	Napalm Death	Utilitarian
28	Corrosion of Conformity	Corrosion of Conformity
28	Mgła	With Hearts Toward None
28	Monarch	Omens
28	Death	Vivus! (live album)
28	UFO	Seven Deadly
28	Veil of Maya	Eclipse
29	Amberian Dawn	Circus Black

=== March ===
Day	Artist	Album
1	Obscura	Illegimitation
2	Heidevolk	Batavi
6	Every Time I Die	Ex Lives
7	Lullacry	Where Angels Fear
7	Torture Killer	I Chose Death (EP)
9	Epica	Requiem for the Indifferent
12	Angel Witch	As Above, So Below
12	Enochian Theory	Life...And All It Entails
12	Gorod	A Perfect Absolution
12	Sigh	In Somniphobia
13	Adrenaline Mob	Omertà
13	Barren Earth	The Devil's Resolve
13	Cannibal Corpse	Torture
13	Impending Doom	Baptized in Filth
13	Soulfly	Enslaved
13	Spawn of Possession	Incurso
13	Monstrosity	Live Apocalypse (DVD)
14	Powerwolf	Alive in the Night (live)
16	Secrets of the Moon	Seven Bells
20	Enthroned	Obsidium
23	Aura Noir	Out to Die
23	Cynic	The Portal Tapes (EP)
23	Gun Barrel	Brace for Impact
23	Ministry	Relapse
23	Axel Rudi Pell	Circle of the Oath
26	Borknagar	Urd
26	Flying Colors	Flying Colors
26	God Forbid	Equilibrium
26	Iron Maiden	En Vivo! (DVD)
26	Naglfar	Téras
26	Wodensthrone	The Storm
26	Wretched	Son of Perdition
27	3 Inches of Blood	Long Live Heavy Metal
27	A Sound of Thunder	Out of the Darkness
27	Black Breath	Sentenced to Life
27	Dark Empire	From Refuge to Ruin
27	Kill Devil Hill	Kill Devil Hill
27	Meshuggah	Koloss
27	OSI	Fire Make Thunder
27	Overkill	The Electric Age
28	Dol Ammad	Cosmic Gods: Episode I – Hyperspeed
28	Galneryus	Phoenix Living In The Rising Sun (DVD)
30	Atrocity	Die Gottlosen Jahre (Double live DVD)
30	Exilia	Decode

=== April ===
Day	Artist	Album
2	Impiety	Ravage & Conquer
3	High on Fire	De Vermis Mysteriis
5	Winter Haven	Godslayer
6	Accept	Stalingrad
6	Eths	III
6	Exumer	Fire & Damnation
6	Illdisposed	The Best of Illdisposed 2004 – 2011 (compilation)
9	Jeff Loomis	Plains of Oblivion
9	The Safety Fire	Grind the Ocean
9	Ufomammut	Oro: Opus Primum
10	Demon Hunter	True Defiance
10	Dirge Within	There Will Be Blood
10	Halestorm	The Strange Case Of...
10	Hortus Animae	Funeral Nation MMXII
10	Emmure	Slave to the Game
10	Ignitor	Year of the Metal Tiger
10	Job for a Cowboy	Demonocracy
10	Municipal Waste	The Fatal Feast
10	Pelican	Ataraxia/Taraxis (EP)
10	Suspyre	The Cycle
10	Undeads Exits Wounds	Merry Go Round 2
14	Buckethead	Balloon Cement
15	DragonForce	The Power Within
16	Gory Blister	Earth-Sick
16	Anathema	Weather Systems
18	In Mourning	The Weight Of Oceans
18	Verjnuarmu	Pimmeyvven Ruhtinas
20	The Foreshadowing	Second World
20	Mekong Delta	Intersections
20	Orden Ogan	To the End
20	Running Wild	Shadowmaker
20	Saxon	Heavy Metal Thunder – Live – Eagles Over Wacken (live DVD)
20	Unleashed	Odalheim
23	Arjen Lucassen	Lost in the New Real
23	Paradise Lost	Tragic Idol
24	16	Deep Cuts from Dark Clouds
24	Earthen Grave	Earthen Grave
24	Prong	Carved into Stone
24	Storm Corrosion	Storm Corrosion
24	Vesperian Sorrow	Stormwinds of Ages
24	Vorkreist	Sigil Whore Christ
24	War of Ages	Return to Life
26	Mezarkabul	MMXII
27	At Vance	Facing Your Enemy
27	Before the Dawn	Rise of the Phoenix
27	Catamenia	The Rewritten Chapters
27	Crystal Viper	Crimen Excepta
27	Huntress	Spell Eater
27	Moonspell	Alpha Noir / Omega White
27	Saint Vitus	Lillie: F-65
30	Angelus Apatrida	The Call
30	Oddland	The Treachery of Senses

=== May ===
Day	Artist	Album
1	Marilyn Manson	Born Villain
4	Cattle Decapitation	Monolith of Inhumanity
4	Dawn of Destiny	Praying to the World
4	U.D.O.	Celebrator – Rare Tracks (Compilation)
8	John 5	God Told Me To
8	Saratoga	Nemesis
14	Distorted Harmony	Utopia
15	Shadows Fall	Fire From the Sky
15	Tenacious D	Rize of the Fenix
16	Shining	Lots of Girls Gonna Get Hurt (EP)
18	Antigama	Stop the Chaos (EP)
18	Carach Angren	Where the Corpses Sink Forever
18	Engel	Blood of Saints
18	Nightmare	The Burden of God
18	Sonata Arctica	Stones Grow Her Name
21	Evil Masquerade	Pentagram
21	Firewind	Few Against Many
21	Tesseract	Perspective (EP)
22	Burzum	Umskiptar
22	Diablo Swing Orchestra	Pandora's Piñata
22	For Today	Immortal
22	Headspace	I Am Anonymous
22	Malice	New Breed of Godz
22	Six Feet Under	Undead
22	To Speak of Wolves	Find Your Worth, Come Home
25	5 Star Grave	Drugstore Hell
25	Ahab	The Giant
25	Grand Magus	The Hunt
25	Insision	15 Years of Exaggerated Torment (compilation)
25	The Murder of My Sweet	Bye Bye Lullaby
25	Sabaton	Carolus Rex
28	Architects	Daybreaker
28	Sarah Jezebel Deva	Malediction (EP)
29	Synthetic Breed	Zero Degrees Freedom (EP)

=== June ===
Day	Artist	Album
1	Be'lakor	Of Breath and Bone
1	Circus Maximus	Nine
1	Delain	We Are The Others
1	Empires of Eden	Channelling the Infinite
1	Gotthard	Firebirth
1	Kekal	Autonomy
1	Jorn	Bring Heavy Rock to the Land
1	Kreator	Phantom Antichrist
4	The Agonist	Prisoners
4	Tank	War Nation
5	Autopsy	Born Undead (DVD)
5	Fear Factory	The Industrialist
5	Gojira	The Flesh Alive (live album)
5	Hellyeah	Band of Brothers
5	Marduk	Serpent Sermon
5	Ulver	Childhood's End (covers album)
5	Watain	Opus Diaboli (DVD)
6	Hibria	Blinded by Tokyo – Live in Japan (DVD)
8	Candlemass	Psalms for the Dead
8	Mnemic	Mnemesis
11	Bilocate	Summoning the Bygones
12	Klank	Urban Warfare
12	Proyecto Eskhata	Decadencia
12	Rush	Clockwork Angels
13	Arthemis	We Fight
17	Dying Fetus	Reign Supreme
18	Spineshank	Anger Denial Acceptance
18	Devin Townsend	By a Thread – Live in London 2011 (DVD)
19	Burning Point	The Ignitor
19	Chelsea Grin	Evolve (EP)
19	The Ghost Inside	Get What You Give
19	Ihsahn	Eremita
19	Rumpelstiltskin Grinder	Ghostmaker
19	Vampires Everywhere!	Hellbound and Heartless
19	Whitechapel	Whitechapel
21	Blacklodge	MachinatioN
21	Ephel Duath	On Death and Cosmos (EP)
22	Luca Turilli's Rhapsody	Ascending to Infinity
22	Deathspell Omega	Drought (EP)
25	Sodom	30 Years Sodomized: 1982-2012 (compilation)
26	Bosse-de-Nage	III
26	Gojira	L'Enfant Sauvage
26	Memphis May Fire	Challenger
26	Old Man Gloom	No
29	Miseration	Tragedy Has Spoken

=== July ===
Day	Artist	Album
2	Bonded by Blood	The Aftermath
2	Six Magics	Falling Angels
3	Icarus Witch	Rise
3	Kataklysm	The Iron Will: 20 Years Determined (DVD)
3	Nile	At the Gate of Sethu
3	Periphery	Periphery II: This Time It's Personal
3	The Word Alive	Life Cycles
4	Coldrain	Through Clarity
6	Naer Mataron	Ζήτω Ο Θάνατος
10	Saint Diablo	Saint Diablo
10	Serj Tankian	Harakiri
13	Bury Tomorrow	The Union of Crowns
16	God Forbid	Beneath the Scars of Glory and Progression (DVD)
16	Waylander	Kindred Spirits
17	A Hero A Fake	The Future Again
17	Baroness	Yellow & Green
17	The Contortionist	Intrinsic
17	Tourniquet	Antiseptic Bloodbath
20	Antagonist A.D.	Nothing from No One
20	Black Majesty	Stargazer
23	Zonaria	Arrival of the Red Sun
24	Om	Advaitic Songs
24	Slipknot	Antennas to Hell (compilation)
26	Heretic	A Time of Crisis
27	Dew-Scented	Icarus
27	Dust Bolt	Violent Demolition
27	Tankard	A Girl Called Cerveza
27	Testament	Dark Roots of Earth
30	Devilish Impressions	Simulacra
30	Massacre	Condemned to the Shadows (EP)
30	Still Alive	Kyo
31	Evoken	Atra Mors
31	Nachtmystium	Silencing Machine

=== August ===
Day	Artist	Album
6	Obliterate	Superboring
7	Memorain	Evolution
13	Cryptopsy	Cryptopsy (EP)
14	The Faceless	Autotheism
14	Fen	Of Losing Interest
14	Fozzy	Sin and Bones
14	In This Moment	Blood
14	Scott Kelly	The Forgiven Ghost in Me
14	Master	The New Elite
14	Texas Hippie Coalition	Peacemaker
14	Steve Vai	The Story of Light
17	Eluveitie	The Early Years (compilation)
21	Black Moor	Lethal Waters
22	Loudness	2012
24	Bloodred Hourglass	Lifebound
24	Grave Digger	Clash of the Gods
24	Tarja Turunen	Act I : Live in Rosario (DVD)
24	Trollfest	Brumlebassen
27	Ensiferum	Unsung Heroes
27	Grave	Endless Procession of Souls
27	Katatonia	Dead End Kings
28	Beardfish	The Void
28	Eagle Twin	The Feather Tipped the Serpent's Scale
28	Murder Construct	Results
28	Stratovarius	Under Flaming Winter Skies – Live in Tampere (DVD)
31	Ektomorf	Black Flag
31	Ex Deo	Caligvla
31	Phantom-x	The Opera of the Phantom
31	Threshold	March of Progress

=== September ===
Day	Artist	Album
3	Primitive Graven Image	Psychededlic Episodes (Observations On Death and Deathlessness)
3	Sacred Mother Tongue	A Light Shines (EP)
7	Lacrimosa	Revolution
10	Aeon Zen	Enigma
11	Beastwars	Beastwars
11	Cloudscape	New Era
11	Cryptopsy	Cryptopsy
11	Kittie	Not So... Safe (compilation)
11	Prototype	Catalyst
11	Spheric Universe Experience	The New Eve
12	The Gathering	Disclosure
14	Elvenking	Era
14	Vision Divine	Destination Set to Nowhere
18	Becoming the Archetype	I Am
18	Devin Townsend Project	Epicloud
18	Down	Down IV Part I - The Purple EP (EP)
18	Ufomammut	Oro: Opus Alter
18	Vision of Disorder	The Cursed Remain Cursed
20	Buckethead	Racks
20	Buckethead	March of the Slunks
20	Buckethead	The Silent Picture Book
21	Behexen	Nightside Emanations
21	Blut Aus Nord	777 – Cosmosophy
21	The Chariot	One Wing
21	Dokken	Broken Bones
21	Handguns	Angst
21	Illdisposed	Sense the Darkness
21	Witchcraft	Legend
24	Steve Harris	British Lion
24	To-Mera	Exile
24	Tygers of Pan Tang	Ambush
25	As I Lay Dying	Awakened
25	Car Bomb	w^w^^w^w
25	Kerion	CloudRiders, Part 1: Road to Skycity
25	Pathology	The Time of Great Purification
25	Revocation	Teratogenesis (EP)
25	Winterfylleth	The Threnody of Triumph
28	Angband	Saved from the Truth
28	Enslaved	RIITIIR
28	Maiden uniteD	Across the Seventh Sea
28	Sinister	The Carnage Ending
28	Therion	Les Fleurs du Mal

=== October ===
Day	Artist	Album
2	Three Days Grace	Transit of Venus
3	Obsession	Order of Chaos
5	Rebellion	The Best Of Viking History (compilation)
5	Sylosis	Monolith
8	Cauldron	Tomorrow's Lost
8	Krisiun	Arise from Blackness (compilation)
9	The Acacia Strain	Death Is the Only Mortal
9	August Burns Red	August Burns Red Presents: Sleddin' Hill
9	Between the Buried and Me	The Parallax II: Future Sequence
9	Converge	All We Love We Leave Behind
9	Daylight Dies	A Frail Becoming
9	Dio	The Very Beast of Dio Vol. 2
9	Malignancy	Eugenics
9	Nonpoint	Nonpoint
9	Seven Kingdoms	Fire is Mine
9	Texas in July	Texas in July
9	Weapon	Embers and Revelations
10	Poema Arcanus	Transient Chronicles
12	Fall of the Idols	Solemn Verses
12	Magica	Center of the Great Unknown
15	Anaal Nathrakh	Vanitas
15	My Dying Bride	A Map of All Our Failures
16	Dethklok	Dethalbum III
16	Kiss	Monster
16	No Bragging Rights	Cycles
16	Yakuza	Beyul
19	Machinae Supremacy	Rise of a Digital Nation
19	Manowar	The Lord of Steel
19	Mob Rules	Cannibal Nation
19	Paragon	Force of Destruction
19	Subhuman	Tributo di Sangue
19	Thy Art Is Murder	Hate
19	War from a Harlots Mouth	Voyeur
19	Wintersun	Time I
22	Bison B.C.	Lovelessness
22	Dark Tranquillity	Zero Distance (EP)
22	Ill Niño	Epidemia
22	The Sword	Apocryphon
23	A Life Once Lost	Ecstatic Trance
23	Behold The Arctopus	Horrorscension
23	God Seed	I Begin
23	Pig Destroyer	Book Burner
23	Sister Sin	Now and Forever
23	The Tony Danza Tapdance Extravaganza	Danza IIII: The Alpha – The Omega
24	Angra	Best Reached Horizons (compilation)
26	Kamelot	Silverthorn
26	Neurosis	Honor Found in Decay
26	Parkway Drive	Atlas
26	Rebellion	Arminius – Furor Teutonicus
26	Skálmöld	Börn Loka
26	The Sorrow	Misery Escape
27	Eyefear	The Inception of Darkness
29	Shining	Redefining Darkness
30	Cradle of Filth	The Manticore and Other Horrors
30	Early Graves	Red Horse
30	Forgotten Tomb	...And Don't Deliver Us From Evil...
30	Nadja	Dagdrøm
30	Ragnarok	Malediction
30	Ultimatum	Heart of Metal (compilation)
31	A Band of Orcs	Adding Heads to the Pile
31	Von	Satanic Blood

=== November ===
Day	Artist	Album
1	Arsenite	Ashes of the Declined
2	NonExist	From My Cold Dead Hands
2	PAIN	We Come In Peace (DVD)
2	Tiamat	The Scarred People
3	Moonlight	Lucifer's Rising
6	All That Remains	A War You Cannot Win
6	Beheaded	Never to Dawn
6	General Surgery	Like an Ever Flying Limb
6	Otep	Sounds Like Armageddon (live album)
7	Bloodbound	In the Name of Metal
8	Isis	Temporal (compilation)
9	Carcariass	Hell and Torment (compilation)
12	Soundgarden	King Animal
12	Tank	War Machine Live (DVD)
13	Deftones	Koi No Yokan
13	Machine Head	Machine Fucking Head Live (live album)
13	Motionless in White	Infamous
14	Led Zeppelin	Celebration Day (DVD)
16	Elysion	Killing My Dreams (EP)
16	Kylesa	From The Vaults, Vol. 1 (compilation)
20	Aeon	Aeons Black
20	Cryptopsy	The Best of Us Bleed (Compilation)
20	Devolved	Reprisal
20	Meldrum	Lifer
20	Prototype	Retrospect (Compilation)
20	Sacred Reich	Live At Wacken (DVD)
21	Flotsam and Jetsam	Ugly Noise
23	Adorned Brood	Kuningaz
23	Destruction	Spiritual Genocide
23	Royal Hunt	20th Anniversary (compilation)
23	Vicious Rumors	Live You to Death (live album)
25	Secret Sphere	Portrait of a Dying Heart
26	Incantation	Vanquish in Vengeance
27	Full Force	Next Level
29	Ashes You Leave	The Cure for Happiness
30	Fragments of Unbecoming	The Art of Coming Apart
30	Gamma Ray	Skeletons & Majesties Live (CD/DVD)
30	HammerFall	Gates Of Dalhalla (DVD)
30	Saturnus	Saturn in Ascension

=== December ===
Day	Artist	Album
4	Arsis	Lepers Caress (EP)
5	Here Comes The Kraken	Aguascalientes (Dead Home City) (single)
5	Yngwie Malmsteen	Spellbound
10	Metallica	Quebec Magnetic (DVD)
12	The Project Hate MCMXCIX	The Cadaverous Retaliation Agenda
14	Paradox	Tales of the Weird
17	Postnecrum	Legado De Sombras
21	The Unguided	InvaZion (EP)

Preceded by 2011	Heavy Metal Timeline; 2012	Succeeded by 2013
