= Gun barrel (disambiguation) =

A gun barrel is a firearm component which guides the projectile during acceleration.

Gun barrel or gunbarrel may also refer to:

- Gun Barrel (band), a German heavy metal band
- Gunbarrel Highway, a road in Australia
- Gun barrel sequence, a sequence featured in most James Bond films
- Gunbarrel, Colorado, an unincorporated community in Boulder County, Colorado
- Gun Barrel City, Texas, a town in Henderson County, Texas

== See also ==
- Barrel of a Gun (disambiguation)
