= Niklas Kvarforth =

Swedish singer

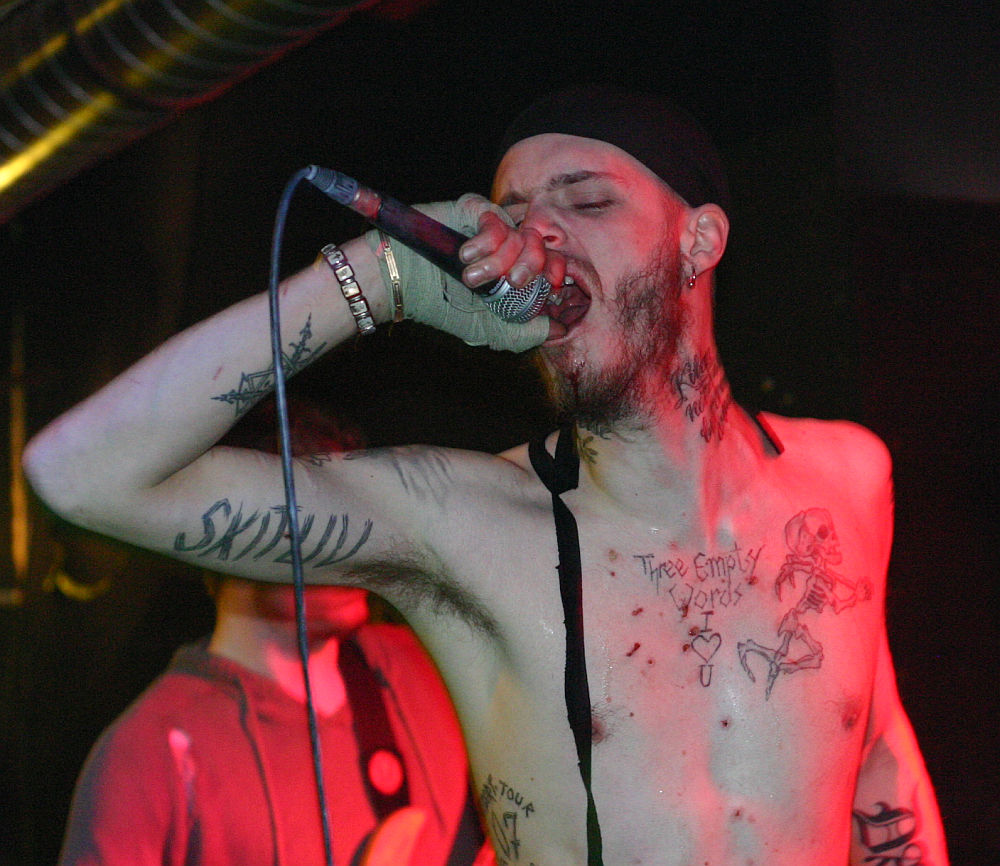
- Kvarforth performing in Austria, 2007

Background information
- Also known as: Kvarforth, Wraith, Ghoul
- Born: Niklas Olsson; 7 December 1983 (age 42); Halmstad, Sweden
- Genre: Black metal
- Occupations: Singer, musician, songwriter
- Instruments: Vocals, guitar, bass, keyboard
- Years active: 1996–present

Niklas Olsson (born 7 December 1983), better known as Niklas Kvarforth, is a Swedish musician. He is the founder, composer and vocalist of the black metal band Shining.

== Biography ==
As a multi-instrumentalist musician, Kvarforth started Shining when he was only 12 years old, in 1996. The band released their first EP, Submit to Selfdestruction, two years later, on which he played guitars and bass. It was not until the band released their first album, Within Deep Dark Chambers, that Kvarforth became the band's vocalist.

Kvarforth is known in the scene for his extreme and sometimes violent behaviour during live performances, including fighting members of other bands, and handing out razor blades to audience members in 2007. Kvarforth has also been accused of assaulting and threatening audience members in 2017.

Kvarforth has also performed auto-mutilations onstage and seems to encourage the practice. He often states in interviews that he hates "everything that grows". It is unclear if his statements made to journalists are in earnest or simply to mock them. Many fans believe he generally holds journalists and reporters in contempt, and purposely mocks them. Kvarforth himself has neither affirmed nor denied this publicly, but consistently expresses his hatred of other people, himself, various countries, and life itself.

== Discography ==
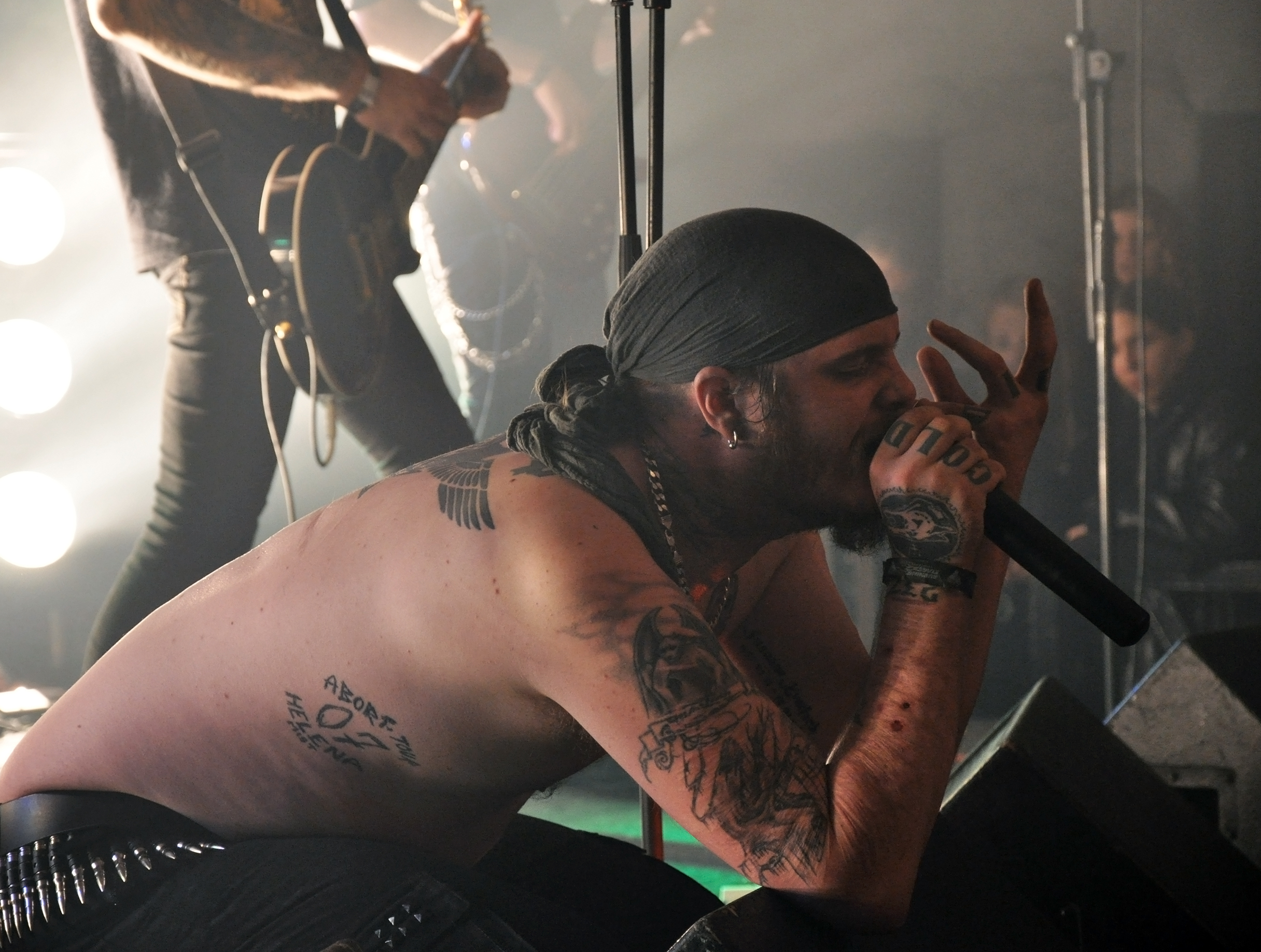
Kvarforth performing in 2011

Year	Title	Band
1998	Submit to Selfdestruction [EP]	Shining
1999	The Silence Ebony	Funeral Dirge
2000	Within Deep Dark Chambers	Shining
2001	Livets Ändhållplats	Shining
2002	III: Angst, Självdestruktivitetens Emissarie	Shining
2005	Hail Terror	Diabolicum
2005	IV: The Eerie Cold	Shining
2007	V: Halmstad	Shining
2008	Amfetamin	Skitliv
2008	Øl, mørke og depresjon	Den Saakaldte
2009	Towards the Eternal Chaos	The Sarcophagus
2009	All Hail Pessimism	Den Saakaldte
2009	VI: Klagopsalmer	Shining
2009	A Sacrificial Offering to the Kingdom of Heaven in a Cracked Dog's Ear	Bethlehem
2009	Solve et Coagula	Manes
2009	Skandinavisk Misantropi	Skitliv
2010	Set Sail to Mystery	The Vision Bleak
2010	Stönkfitzchen	Bethlehem
2011	VII: Född Förlorare	Shining
2012	Redefining Darkness	Shining
2014	Desideratum	Anaal Nathrakh
2015	IX: Everyone, Everything, Everywhere, Ends	Shining
2016	Aeons In Sodom	Urgehal
2018	X: Varg Utan Flock	Shining
2020	A Forest	Behemoth
2023	Lange leve döden	Høstsol
2023	Shining	Shining
