= Sudden Death Syndrome (album) =

Studio album by Bilocate
- Released: January 7, 2008
- Genre: Oriental metal Black metal Death-doom
- Length: 51:18
- Label: Kolony Records
- Producer: Jens Bogren

Bilocate chronology
Dysphoria (2005)	Sudden Death Syndrome (2008)	Summoning the Bygones (2012)

Professional ratings
Review scores
Source	Rating
Chronicles of Chaos	8/10 stars
The Metal Crypt	4/5 stars

Sudden Death Syndrome is the second album by the Jordanian dark Oriental metal band Bilocate. It was released independently on January 7, 2008.

== Track listing ==
All songs written by BILOCATE.

No.	Title	Length
1.	"Humans & the Dark Affiliation"	2:05
2.	"Blooded Forest"	17:02
3.	"The Dead Sea"	5:45
4.	"Ebtehal"	9:33
5.	"Inoculate"	5:12
6.	"Pure Wicked Sins"	6:28
7.	"The Stone of Hate"	5:13
Total length:		51:18

== Personnel ==
Bilocate

- Ramzi Essayed – vocals
- Rami Haikal – guitar
- Waseem Essayed – Keyboard instrument
- Hani Al Abadi – bass guitar
- Baha' Farah – guitar
- Ahmad Klob – drums

Production

- Co-produced, mixed, and engineered by Jens Bogren
- Mastered at Fascination Street studios, Örebro, Sweden, by Jens Bogren
- Drums by Ahmed Klob & Waseem EsSayed, recorded by Ahmed Kloub, and digitized by Waseem EsSayed; engineered by Jens Bogran
- Guitars and Arabic Oud recorded by Rami Haikal and Baha' Farah
- Bass recorded at The Phexagon studio; sound technician Mohannad Bursheh, Amman, Jordan
- Vocals recorded at In The Mix studios; sound engineer Nash Planojevic, Dubai, UAE
- Keyboards, percussion, and pianos recorded and engineered by Waseem EsSayed
