= Halmstad (Niklas angående Niklas) =

Studio album by Shining
- Released: 16 April 2007
- Genres: Depressive black metal, progressive black metal
- Length: 42:35
- Language: Swedish
- Label: Osmose

Shining chronology
The Eerie Cold (2005)	Halmstad (Niklas angående Niklas) (2007)	Klagopsalmer (2009)

Professional ratings
Review scores
Source	Rating
Sputnikmusic	4/5

Halmstad (Niklas angående Niklas) (Swedish for "Halmstad (Niklas Regarding Niklas)") is the fifth album by Swedish black metal band Shining. It was released by Osmose Productions on 16 April 2007. A black LP edition was released and limited to 500 copies.

Track 1 starts with the beginning verses of "Antigonish", an 1889 poem by William Hughes Mearns, recited in the opening scene of Identity:

As I was going up the stair
I met a man who wasn't there.
He wasn't there again today.
I wish, I wish, he'd go away.

— William Hughes Mearns, Antigonish

Track 5 is an arrangement of Ludwig van Beethoven's "Moonlight Sonata". Several lines by Christina Ricci from the movie Prozac Nation were sampled in this album.

In 2013, Decibel ranked Halmstad at number 95 on its list of the Top 100 Black Metal Albums of All Time.

== Track listing ==
No.	Title	Length
1.	"Ytterligare ett steg närmare total jävla utfrysning" (Yet Another Step Towards Complete Fucking Isolation)	6:22
2.	"Längtar bort från mitt hjärta" (Longing Away from My Heart)	8:29
3.	"Låt oss ta allt från varandra" (Let Us Take Everything from Each Other)	6:05
4.	"Besvikelsens dystra monotoni" (The Gloomy Monotony of Disappointment)	10:05
5.	"Åttiosextusenfyrahundra" (Eightysix-thousand-fourhundred)	2:43
6.	"Neka morgondagen" (Deny Tomorrow)	8:49
Total length:		42:35

== Personnel ==
Shining

- Niklas Kvarforth – vocals
- Fredric Gråby – guitar
- Peter Huss – guitar
- Johan Hallander – bass
- Ludwig Witt – drums

Additional

- Marcus Pålsson – grand piano on "Åttiosextusenfyrahundra"
- Ynas Lindskog – lyrics on "Låt oss ta allt från varandra"
