= Catalyst (Prototype album) =

Studio album by Prototype
- Released: September 11, 2012
- Studio: Wyman Records; Utopia (North Hollywood, California)
- Genre: Progressive metal; thrash metal
- Length: 61:20
- Label: Nightmare
- Producer: Prototype

Prototype chronology
Continuum (2006)	Catalyst (2012)

Singles from Catalyst
- 1. "Catalyst" Released: August 27, 2012

Catalyst is the third studio album by American progressive metal band Prototype, released on September 11, 2012, by Nightmare Records. It was their first studio album to feature drummer Pat Magrath as a permanent member of the band since Trinity (2002). The band's first conceptual album, the album tells a story depicting events and the symbiotic relationship between humankind and an alien race. Upon release, the album received mixed to positive reviews.

== Track listing ==
All lyrics are written by Vince Levalois; all music is composed by Levalois, Kragen Lum and Kirk Scherer, except where noted.

No.	Title	Music	Length
1.	"Inceptum" (instrumental)	Levalois; Scherer	1:28
2.	"Catalyst"		4:52
3.	"Cynic Dreams"		7:06
4.	"The Chosen Ones"		6:15
5.	"Illuminatum" (instrumental)		2:27
6.	"My Own Deception"		8:13
7.	"Into Oblivion"		5:02
8.	"Impetus" (instrumental)	Levalois; Scherer	1:36
9.	"Gravity Well"		7:11
10.	"The Ageless Heart of Memory"		6:54
11.	"Exiled"	Lum	4:58
12.	"Communion"		5:18
Total length:			61:20

== Personnel ==
Credits are adapted from the album's liner notes.

Prototype

- Vince Levalois – vocals, guitar
- Kragen Lum – guitar
- Kirk Scherer – bass
- Pat Magrath – drums

Production

- Prototype – producers
- Neil Kernon – mixing
- Alan Douches – mastering

Artwork

- Travis Smith – artwork, package design and layout (with band)
- Sydney Levalois – band photography
