= The Eerie Cold =

Studio album by Shining
- Released: 20 February 2005
- Recorded: 2004
- Genre: Black metal
- Length: 42:53
- Label: Avantgarde Music

Shining chronology
Angst, självdestruktivitetens emissarie (2002)	The Eerie Cold (2005)	Halmstad (Niklas angående Niklas) (2007)

The Eerie Cold is the fourth album by Shining. It was released on Avantgarde Music in 2005. A black LP version was released, limited to 500 copies. This album was originally intended to be the band's last.

The end of "Claws of Perdition" includes sampled audio from the ending monologue of Christian Bale's character Patrick Bateman in American Psycho.

It is the final Shining album to include Mayhem drummer Hellhammer, as he would depart from Shining shortly after the tour supporting its release.

== Track listing ==
No.	Title	Length
0.	Untitled (A spoken-word introduction appears on some copies (Note: Promo CD had a spoken intro on the first track that was removed from the retail version, however, the Peaceville reissue does feature this spoken word intro.))	2:00
1.	"I och med insikt skall du förgå" (As You Reach Insight You Shall Perish)	7:31
2.	"Vemodets arkitektur" (The Architecture of Sadness)	7:53
3.	"Någonting är jävligt fel" (Something is Very Wrong)	6:20
4.	"Eradication of the Condition"	6:58
5.	"The Eerie Cold (Samvetskvalens Ballad)" (The Eerie Cold (The Ballad of Remorse))	5:52
6.	"Claws of Perdition"	6:18
Total length:		42:53

== Personnel ==
- Niklas Kvarforth – vocals, guitar, keyboard
- John Doe – guitar
- Phil A. Cirone – bass, keyboard
- Hellhammer – drums
