= Continuum (Prototype album) =

Studio album by Prototype
- Released: May 23, 2006
- Studios: Various: The Mothership Studio; (Hollywood, California); Utopia Studios; (North Hollywood, California); Utopia II Studios; (Sherman Oaks, California)
- Genres: Progressive metal; thrash metal
- Length: 42:45
- Label: Nightmare
- Producer: Prototype

Prototype chronology
Trinity (2002)	Continuum (2006)	Catalyst (2012)

Professional ratings
Review scores
Source	Rating
Scream Magazine	4/6

Continuum is the second studio album by American progressive metal band Prototype. The album was released on May 23, 2006, via Nightmare Records. The opening track on the album, "The Way It Ends", was featured as a bonus track in the music rhythm game Guitar Hero III: Legends of Rock and as part of the Rock Band Network's downloadable content.

== Track listing ==
All lyrics are written by Vince Levalois, except where noted.

No.	Title	Lyrics	Music	Length
1.	"The Way It Ends"		Levalois; Kragen Lum	5:22
2.	"Probe"		Levalois; Lum	2:47
3.	"Devotion"		Levalois; Lum	5:02
4.	"With Vision"		Levalois; Lum; Stephen Gambina	4:13
5.	"Synthespian"		Levalois; Lum	3:25
6.	"Sea of Tranquility"	Instrumental	Lum	1:29
7.	"Transcendent Velocity"		Levalois; Lum; Gambina	3:39
8.	"Seed"		Levalois; Lum	4:44
9.	"Undying"		Levalois; Lum; Kirk Scherer	2:42
10.	"Heart Machine"	Lum	Levalois; Lum; Scherer	4:22
11.	"Cold Is This God"		Levalois; Lum	5:00
Total length:				42:45

== Personnel ==
Credits are adapted from the album's liner notes.

Prototype

- Vince Levalois – vocals, guitar, engineering
- Kragen Lum – guitar, backing vocals on "Probe", additional engineering
- Kirk Scherer – bass

Additional musicians

- Damion Ramirez – drums on tracks 1–9, 11
- Pat Magrath – drums on "Heart Machine"

Production

- Prototype – producers
- Neil Citron – engineering
- Neil Kernon – mixing
- Eddy Schreyer – mastering

Artwork

- Travis Smith – artwork, package design and layout (with band)
- Alex Solca – band photography
