= Art Bleeds =

Studio album by Gory Blister
- Released: 1999 Re-issued 2003
- Genre: Technical Death metal
- Length: 33:07
- Label: Sekhmet Records

Art Bleeds is the first album by Italian technical death metal band Gory Blister. Originally an Independent record, it was re-issued by Sekhmet Records in November 2003.

== Track listing ==
1. "Primordial Scenery" – 4:01
2. "As Blood Moves" – 3:25
3. "Art Bleeds" – 3:09
4. "Mermaids Beloved" – 1:21
5. "Anticlimax" – 3:13
6. "Cognitive Sinergy" – 3:49
7. "Snowfall" – 3:03
8. "A Gout From the Scar" – 3:25
9. "Comet... and Her Trail of Spiritual Dust" - 3:54
10. "Never Let Me Down (Depeche Mode cover)" - 3:46

== Credits ==
- Dome – vocals
- Raff Sangiorgio – guitar
- Bruce Teah – bass
- Joe La Viola – drums
- Alberto Cutolo – remastering
- B-Lial – illustrations
- Bruce Teah and Gory Blister – producer
- Gabriele Ravaglia and Riccardo "Paso" Pasini - engineer
