= Klagopsalmer =

Studio album by Shining
- Released: 30 June 2009
- Genres: Black metal, progressive metal
- Length: 50:46
- Label: Osmose Productions
- Producers: Rickard Bengtsson, Niklas Kvarforth, Peter Huss, Fredric Gråby

Shining chronology
Halmstad (2007)	Klagopsalmer (2009)	Född förlorare (2011)

Klagopsalmer (roughly, Hymns of Lament) is the sixth album by Shining. It was released on 30 June 2009 by Osmose Productions.

Track 4 is a cover version of Seigmen's "Ohm" (from the Total album). "Ohm" is sung in Norwegian, making it the only song on the album not sung in Swedish.

Samplings on the album are from the 1979 documentary Ett anständigt liv by Stefan Jarl. Erik Danielsson from Swedish black metal band Watain is responsible for the album cover art.

== Track listing ==
No.	Title	Writer(s)	Length
1.	"Vilseledda barnasjälars hemvist" (The Residence of Misled Children's Souls)	Niklas Kvarforth	6:39
2.	"Plågoande o'helga plågoande" (Tormentor, Oh Sacred Tormentor)	Kvarforth	6:49
3.	"Fullständigt jävla död inuti" (Completely Fucking Dead Inside)	Graby, Kvarforth	8:02
4.	"Ohm – Sommar med Siv" (Ohm – Summer With Siv)	Seigmen	7:10
5.	"Krossade drömmar och brutna löften" (Crushed Dreams and Broken Promises)		5:06
6.	"Total utfrysning" (Total Ostracism)	Kvarforth, Huss	16:46
Total length:			50:46

== Personnel ==
- Niklas Kvarforth – vocals, guitars, and concept
- Fredric Gråby – lead and rhythm guitars
- Peter Huss – lead and rhythm guitars
- Andreas Larssen – bass guitar
- Rickard Schill – drums
- Marcus Pålsson – grand piano
- Linnea Olsson – cello
- Margareta Olsson – viola
- Birgit Huss – violin
- Lars Fredrik Frøislie – keyboards
