= Barrel of a Gun (disambiguation) =

"Barrel of a Gun" is a 1997 song by Depeche Mode.

Barrel of a Gun may also refer to:

- "Barrel of a Gun", a song by Guster from Lost and Gone Forever
- The Barrel of a Gun, documentary about Mumia Abu-Jamal by Tigre Hill

== See also ==
- Gun barrel (disambiguation)
- "Looking Down the Barrel of a Gun", a song by Beastie Boys from their 1989 album Paul's Boutique
