= Lots of Girls Gonna Get Hurt =

EP by Shining
- Released: 30 May 2012
- Recorded: Sonic Train Studios, Varberg, Sweden between January and March 2012
- Genre: Doom metal, gothic metal, progressive metal
- Length: 20:07
- Label: Spinefarm

Lots of Girls Gonna Get Hurt is an EP by the Swedish black metal band Shining. It was released through Spinefarm Records on 30 May 2012.

== Track listing ==
| No. | Title | Writer(s) | Length |
|---|---|---|---|
| 1. | "For My Demons" (Katatonia cover) | Anders Nyström, Jonas Renkse | 6:03 |
| 2. | "Utan dina andetag" (Kent cover) | Joakim Berg | 4:30 |
| 3. | "Kung av jidder" (Imperiet cover) | Fred Asp, Christian Falk, Joakim Thåström | 4:53 |
| 4. | "Carnival of Rust" (Poets of the Fall cover) | Markus "Captain" Kaarlonen, Marko Saaresto, Olli Tukiainen | 4:41 |
| Total length: | | | 20:07 |

- Track 1 ("For My Demons") is originally from the album Tonight's Decision by Katatonia.
- Track 2 ("Utan dina andetag") is originally a single and from the compilation B-sidor 95–00 by Kent.
- Track 3 ("Kung av jidder") is originally from the album Tiggarens tal by Imperiet.
- Track 4 ("Carnival of Rust") is originally from the album Carnival of Rust by Poets of the Fall.

== Personnel ==
=== Shining ===
- Niklas Kvarforth – vocals, guitars, keyboards
- Peter Huss – guitars
- Christian Larsson – bass guitar
- Ludwig Witt – drums

=== Additional musicians ===
- Elias Holmlid (Dragonland) – string arrangements ("Utan dina andetag")
- Peter Bjärgö (Arcana) – vocal coach

=== Production ===
- Pauline Greefhorst – album cover art
- Andy LaRocque – recording, mixing, mastering
