= Redefining Darkness =

Studio album by Shining
- Released: 29 October 2012
- Recorded: Sonic Train Studios between January and March 2012
- Genres: Black metal, progressive metal
- Length: 40:54
- Label: Spinefarm
- Producers: Andy LaRocque, Shining

Shining chronology
Född förlorare (2011)	Redefining Darkness (2012)	Everyone, Everything, Everywhere, Ends (2015)

Professional ratings
Review scores
Source	Rating
Metal Temple	9/10 (almost perfect)
Thrash Hits	5/6

Redefining Darkness is the eighth studio album by the Swedish black metal band Shining. It was released through Spinefarm Records on 29 October 2012. The album is dedicated to the memory of Trond Bråthen (a.k.a. "Trondr Nefas").

== Track listing ==
All lyrics are written by Niklas Kvarforth; all music is composed by Shining.

No.	Title	English translation	Length
1.	"Du, mitt konstverk"	You, My Artwork	7:41
2.	"The Ghastly Silence"		7:18
3.	"Han som hatar människan"	He Who Hates The Human	6:48
4.	"Hail Darkness Hail"		7:05
5.	"Det stora grå" (Writer: Rich Ragsdale (Instrumental))	The Great Grey	3:26
6.	"For the God Below"		8:36
Total length:			40:54

=== LP track listing ===
Side A
No.	Title	Length
1.	"Du, mitt konstverk"	7:43
2.	"The Ghastly Silence"	7:20
3.	"Han som hatar människan"	6:50

Side B
No.	Title	Length
1.	"Hail Darkness Hail"	7:08
2.	"Det stora grå"	3:26
3.	"For the God Below"	8:36

== Personnel ==
=== Shining ===
- Niklas Kvarforth – vocals, guitars, keyboards
- Peter Huss – guitars
- Christian Larsson – bass guitar
- Ludwig Witt – drums

=== Additional musicians ===
- Hoest – additional vocals ("Du, mitt konstverk")
- Andreas Huss – saxophone ("The Ghastly Silence")
- Rob Caggiano – lead guitar (first guitar solo) ("Han som hatar människan")
- Peter Bjärgö – additional vocals ("Hail Darkness Hail")
- Olli Ahvenlahti – piano ("Det stora grå")
- Andy LaRocque – lead guitar (second guitar solo) ("For the God Below")

=== Production ===
- Trine + Kim Design Studio – artwork
- Andy LaRocque, Shining – producer
