= Summoning the Bygones =

Studio album by BILOCATE
- Released: 11 June 2012
- Recorded: 10 January–4 September 2011 'In the Mix' Studio (Vocals), Dubai Horned Helmet Studio (Bass), JO (vocals) All other Instruments were recorded in JO
- Genre: Black metal, oriental metal
- Label: Code666
- Producer: BILOCATE

BILOCATE chronology
Sudden Death Syndrome (2008)	Summoning the Bygones (2012)

Professional ratings
Review scores
Source	Rating
Brutalism	5/5 stars
Metal.de	8/10
Lords of Metal	96/100
Metal-Temple	4/5 stars
MetalUnderground	4/5 stars

Summoning the Bygones is the third full-length studio album by BILOCATE. It was released four years after Sudden Death Syndrome. Quoted is a description of the album written by BILOCATE: "Summoning The Bygones is BILOCATE's early visions presented in a new outfit, we've always felt that Dysphoria has much value to offer to listeners, however, maybe it got somehow underrated due to the weak sound quality (compared to SDS), so we'd like to share the same spirit and music and ideas with our listeners but with more proper arrangements, production, and sound quality.

The album also includes a modified version of "Days of Joy" under a new name (which is actually the first name this song had originally when it was created in 2003), in addition to a brand new song and a cover song.

As with its predecessor Sudden Death Syndrome, the album was co-produced, mixed and mastered at Fascination Street Studios, Orebro, Sweden by Jens Bogren

The artwork of the album Summoning the Bygones won the Metal Riot's June Ultimate Cover Art Showdown.

== Track listing ==
No.	Title	Length
1.	"The Tragedy Within"	8:45
2.	"Beyond Inner Sleep"	5:59
3.	"A Deadly Path"	9:52
4.	"Passage"	5:01
5.	"Dead Emotion (Paradise Lost cover)"	5:25
6.	"Hypia (feat. Dan Swano)"	9:34
7.	"2nd War in Heaven"	8:22
8.	"A Desire to Leave (feat. Dan Swano)": I. "Obscurity" (9:13); II. "Surrounding" (6:21); III. "...Of Leaving" (4:17)"	19:51

== Personnel ==
BILOCATE

- Ramzi EsSayed – vocals
- Hani Al-Abbadi – bass guitar
- Rami Haikal – guitar; engineering
- Baha Farah – guitar
- Ahmad Kloub – Drums
- Waseem EsSayyed – Keyboards
