= Beastwars (album) =

Studio album by Beastwars
- Released: 9 May 2011
- Recorded: 2010
- Studio: Dunedin
- Genres: Sludge metal, stoner metal
- Length: 39:03
- Label: Destroy
- Producers: Dale Cotton and Beastwars

Beastwars chronology
Beastwars (2011)	Blood Becomes Fire (2013)

Professional ratings
Review scores
Source	Rating
The New Zealand Herald	5/5 stars
PopMatters	8/10
Sputnikmusic	4/5 stars
Under the Radar	8.8/10

Beastwars is the debut studio album of the New Zealand-based heavy metal band Beastwars. The album was released on 9 May 2011 through New Zealand independent label Destroy Records, and was distributed by Universal Music. Beastwars received general critical acclaim from New Zealand publications, and reached an RIANZ album chart placing of #15. The album enjoyed further success at the 2011 New Zealand Music Awards, receiving a nomination for best New Zealand rock album and winning the award for best album artwork or packaging. It was also shortlisted for the 2012 Taite Music Prize.

== Track listing ==
No.	Title	Writer(s)	Lead vocals	Length
0.	"Untitled (Hidden Track)"			1:32
1.	"Damn the Sky"	Beastwars	Matt Hyde	5:19
2.	"Lake of Fire"	Beastwars	Matt Hyde	4:09
3.	"Mihi"	Beastwars	Matt Hyde	3:42
4.	"Daggers"	Beastwars	Matt Hyde	4:53
5.	"Call Out the Dead"	Beastwars	Matt Hyde	4:36
6.	"Red God"	Beastwars	Matt Hyde	2:50
7.	"Iron Wolf"	Beastwars	Matt Hyde	4:22
8.	"Cthulhu"	Beastwars	Matt Hyde	4:46
9.	"Empire"	Beastwars	Matt Hyde	4:34
Total length:				39:03

== Personnel ==
Beastwars

- Clayton Anderson – guitars
- Nathan Hickey – drums
- Matt Hyde – vocals
- James Woods – bass guitar

== Charts ==
Chart performance for Beastwars
Chart (2011)	Peak position
New Zealand Albums (RMNZ)	15
Chart (2021)	Peak position
New Zealand Albums (RMNZ)	18
