= Bilocate =

Jordanian dark Oriental metal band

- Origin: Jordan
- Genres: Death-doom; Oriental metal Blackened death metal
- Years active: 2002–present
- Label: Code666, Kolony Records
- Members: Ramzi Essayed; Rami Haikal; Waseem Essayed; Hani Al Abadi; Baha' Farah; Ahmad Klob
- Past members: Ibrahim Al Qaisi
- Website: Official Web Page

Bilocate is a dark Oriental metal band from Amman, Jordan, founded in 2002 by Ramzi Essayed, Waseem Essayed and Hani Al Abbadi. The band combines doom metal, death metal and black metal with Oriental elements.

== History ==
Brothers Ramzi and Waseem Essayed and their friend Hani Al Abadi founded the band. They were joined by guitarist Baha' Farah, and later by guitarist Rami Haikal. Their first full-length album, Dysphoria, was released in the winter of 2005, and received significant airplay on the local governmental radio station Jordan FM, with a 5-hour show dedicated to the band and the album on October 27. They released a music video for "2nd War in Heaven." A second video, for "Days of Joy," was produced by Jacknife Video Productions. Bilocate added drummer Ahmad Kloob in late 2006, and started preparing a new album.

In July 2008, Sudden Death Syndrome was released, mixed and mastered by Jens Bogren (Opeth, Bloodbath, Katatonia, Paradise Lost, and others). The album received positive reviews from magazines and websites such as Decibel and Blabbermouth.net. The album was self-released and is now distributed in the United States via The Omega Order, the distribution arm of The End Records. In December 2008, Terrorizer called Sudden Death Syndrome "a tasteful and sophisticated piece of work that determinedly puts the Jordanian metal scene on the map." The album has led to coverage for the band in the West in the heavy metal media online as well as in print, such as interviews with Terrorizer and Metal Hammer. The latter praised their "rich, doomy sound" and called Sudden Death Syndrome a "stunning, heartfelt metal album." Metal Storm nominated the album for its Best Doom Metal Album Award; it finished sixth out of ten.

Heavy metal music is controversial in Jordan, as suggested in a brief interview with Terrorizer, December 2008, in which Rami Haikal said, "We have even been told to dissolve the band and to stop publishing our music by any means." In an interview with Metal Hammer, Waseem Essayed said, "We are facing a lot of pressure and a huge rejection from security, religious authorities, and the community." The UAE newspaper The National reported in October 2008, in a series of articles called "Young in the Muslim World," that a Bilocate concert in Jordan was canceled by authorities, "citing unspecified 'security reasons.'"

== Band members ==
=== Current members ===
- Ramzi Essayed - vocals (2003–present)
- Hani Al Abadi - bass (2003–present)
- Waseem Essayed - keyboards
- Baha Farah - guitars (lead) (2003–present)
- Rami Haikal - guitars (rhythm) (2003–present)
- Ahmed Kloub - drums (2006–present)

=== Past members ===
- Ibrahim Al Qaisi - drums (2006)

=== Session members ===
- Ala' Faraj - guitars (2008–present)

== Discography ==
=== Albums ===
- Dysphoria (2005)
- Sudden Death Syndrome (2008)
- Summoning the Bygones (2012)

=== EP's, Demos and Singles ===
- Dysphoria (Demo, 2003)
