= Beastwars =

New Zealand musical group

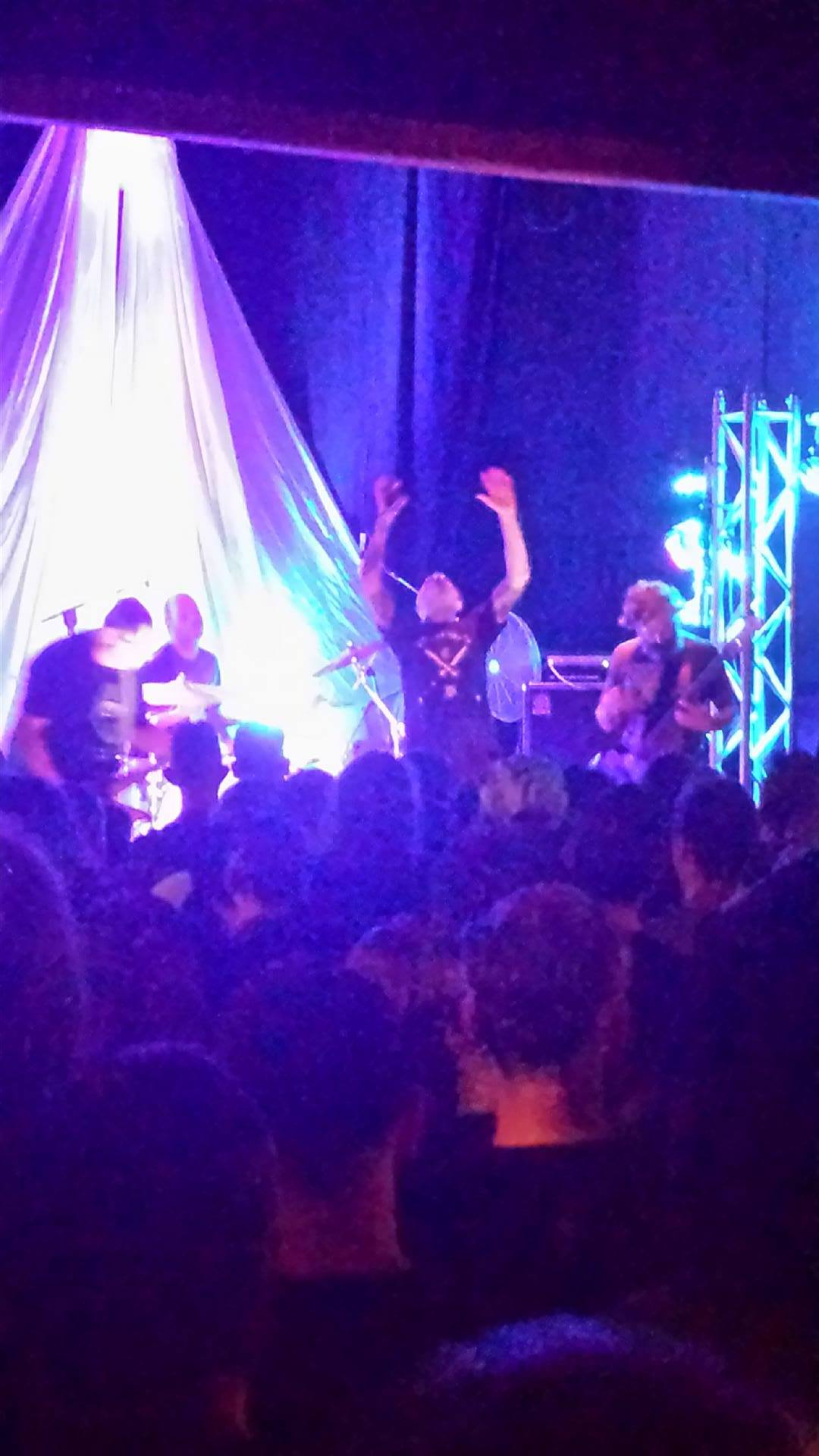
- Matt Hyde, Nathan Hickey, James Woods, Clayton Anderson

Background information
- Origin: Wellington/The Hutt, New Zealand
- Genres: Sludge metal, stoner metal
- Years active: 2006–present
- Members: Nathan Hickey; Matt Hyde; James Woods; Christian Pearce
- Past members: Clayton Anderson
- Website: http://beastwars.bandcamp.com/

Beastwars is a sludge metal band from New Zealand.

The early history of the band can be said to have begun in 1986 when Matt Hyde began his first band, Microwave Babies, while attending Saint Bernard's College in Lower Hutt. They disbanded in 1988. Hyde then moved to Australia, and then London. Aaron Carson in Auckland invited Hyde to try out for his new band, The Larry Normans. At around the same time Nathan "Nato" Hickey was an up and coming bass and guitar musician. Hickey was introduced to Clayton Anderson, a guitarist in metal bands. This is about the time Hickey began playing drums. Hickey had also discussed forming a band with James Woods, and brought him along. At some point Hyde met Hickey, and the beginning of Beastwars was underway. The band was formed in 2006, and played their first show as a four-piece unit in 2009.

Their 2011 self-titled debut album received positive reviews in the band's native country and invited musical comparisons to Soundgarden, Mastodon, and Unsane, amongst others. The album also gained recognition for Nick Keller's cover design, winning the 2011 New Zealand Music Award for Best Album Artwork or Packaging. The band received a nomination for best New Zealand Rock Album at the same ceremony, but ultimately lost out to Ignite by Shihad. The album was also shortlisted for the 2012 Taite Music Prize.

The group has opened for Mastodon, High on Fire, Fu Manchu and Kyuss and in 2012 performed at the Auckland Big Day Out music festival alongside notable international acts such as Soundgarden, Röyksopp, and Kasabian. In 2011, a limited release custom-brewed beer was commissioned bearing the band's name.

Their second and fourth albums, Blood Becomes Fire and IV respectively, were shortlisted for the Taite Music Prize in 2014 and 2020.

In July 2023, the band announced that guitarist Christian Pearce would join the band to replace Clayton Anderson.

== Discography ==
Studio albums

- Beastwars (Destroy Records/Universal Music, 2011)
- Blood Becomes Fire (2013)
- The Death of All Things (2016)
- IV (2019)
- Beastwars (10th Anniversary Remaster) (2021)
- Tyranny of Distance (2023)
- The Ship//The Sea (2025)

Live Albums

- Live at San Fran (2020)

Singles

- Cold Wind/When I'm King (2021)
