= Född förlorare =

Studio album by Shining
- Released: 25 May 2011
- Genres: Black metal, progressive metal
- Length: 41:47
- Label: Spinefarm Records

Shining chronology
Klagopsalmer (2009)	Född förlorare (2011)	Redefining Darkness (2012)

Född förlorare (Born Loser) is the seventh album by Shining, released by Spinefarm Records on 25 May 2011. "Tillsammans är vi allt" includes Håkan Hemlin of Nordman on clean vocals, while Erik Danielsson of Watain appears on "Tiden läker inga sår".

"I nattens timma" is a cover version of a song written by the Swedish progressive rock group Landberk, released on their 1992 album Riktigt äkta.

The track "FFF" is dedicated to Kvarforth's mother, Susanne, who died from a heart attack at the beginning of 2010.

== Track listing ==
No.	Title	Length
1.	"Förtvivlan, min arvedel" (Despair, My Inheritance)	6:29
2.	"Tiden läker inga sår" (Time Heals No Wounds)	8:10
3.	"Människa o'avskyvärda människa" (Man, O' Despicable Man)	6:42
4.	"Tillsammans är vi allt" (Together We Are Everything)	9:22
5.	"I nattens timma" (In the Hour of the Night: originally by Landberk)	4:04
6.	"FFF"	7:00
Total length:		41:47

== Charts ==
Chart (2011)	Peak position
Finnish Albums (Suomen virallinen lista)	21
