= Better to Die on Your Feet Than Live on Your Knees =

Studio album by Liberteer
- Released: January 31, 2012
- Genre: Grindcore
- Length: 26:56
- Label: Relapse
- Producer: Matthew Widener

Liberteer chronology
Manifesto for the New Patriot (2005)	Better to Die on Your Feet Than Live on Your Knees (2012)

Better to Die on Your Feet Than Live on Your Knees is the debut album by American grindcore project Liberteer. It was released on January 31, 2012 through Relapse Records.

The album showcases a grindcore sound with influences from bluegrass, folk music, black metal and old school death metal, as well as classical music, which the band leader Matthew Widener studies. It also features major-key riffs, digitized horns, banjos, mandolin, martial drumming and blast beats. The record is a concept album with an anarchist sentiment and named after an Emiliano Zapata quote.

== Critical reception ==
Professional ratings
Review scores
Source	Rating
Metal Injection	9/10
Pitchfork	7.8/10

The album generally received positive reviews from critics. Metal Injection critic Jeremy Ulrey wrote: "Widener does a pretty good job with pacing and there is a point to it all and at 27 minutes anyone hardy enough to be a grind fan to begin with should be able to handle it in one sitting." Pitchfork's Brandon Stosuy thought that the record "coming over like Napalm Death clobbering John Philip Sousa." Stosuy also compared the record to his anarchist past, stating: "It reminded me how good it feels to want to tear things down; more importantly, Widener has the intelligence and ambition to create something new in the process." Kiel Hume of Exclaim! wrote: "Rather than the kind of militant machismo one finds in Today is the Day, Liberteer have synthesized the wrong century for its formal experimentation and inspiration." Hume further concluded that "some tracks on this album sound like they're straight from the Trans Siberian Orchestra."

The album was named as number 12 on CraveOnline's list of "The 20 Best Metal Albums of 2012" and number 20 on Decibel's list of "Top 40 Albums of 2012".

== Track listing ==
No.	Title	Length
1.	"The Falcon Cannot Hear the Falconer"	0:36
2.	"Build No System"	1:34
3.	"Without Blazon (Is the Flag I Hold Up and Do Not Wag)"	1:41
4.	"We Are Not Afraid of Ruins"	1:23
5.	"Class War Never Meant More Than It Does Now"	1:18
6.	"Rise Like Lions After Slumber"	0:57
7.	"That Which Is Not Given But Taken"	2:47
8.	"Better To Die On Your Feet Than Live on Your Knees"	1:47
9.	"Usurious Epitaph"	0:59
10.	"Revolution's Wick Burning Quick"	0:51
11.	"99 to 1"	1:36
12.	"Sweat for Blood"	1:24
13.	"Barbarians at the Gates"	1:57
14.	"When We Can't Dream Any Longer"	1:00
15.	"It Is the Secret Curse of Power That It Becomes Fatal"	3:26
16.	"I Am Spartacus"	1:41
17.	"Feast of Industry"	1:59

== Personnel ==
- Matthew Widener – all instruments, vocals, production
