= Slugdge =

British extreme metal band

- Origin: Lancashire, England, UK
- Genres: Blackened death metal; progressive death metal
- Years active: 2012–present
- Label: Willowtip
- Members: Matthew Moss; Kevin Pearson; Matthew Lowe; Alan Cassidy

Slugdge is a British extreme metal band, formed in Lancashire, England, in 2012. Originally a studio project headed by former No Sin Evades His Gaze guitarist Kevin Pearson and vocalist Matthew Moss, in 2018 the group expanded into a full lineup with the addition of No Sin Evades His Gaze bassist Matthew Lowe, and The Black Dahlia Murder drummer Alan Cassidy. The group has released four studio albums to date.

== History ==
Slugdge was originally formed by friends Kevin Pearson and Matt Moss in 2012, as a response to the amount of sludge metal groups named after animals. Inspired by Akercocke, the group themed their songs around a fictional cosmic slug deity called "Mollusca". They released their first three albums, Born of Slime (2013), Gastronomicon (2014) and Dim & Slimeridden Kingdoms (2015) independently through Bandcamp (the latter two being featured by Stereogum's best of lists for their respective years), before signing to Willowtip Records in 2017.

The band released their fourth album, Esoteric Malacology, on 2 March 2018 via Willowtip. The album was exclusively streamed via MetalSucks.net in the days leading up to the release. Shortly after the album's release, which topped Bandcamp's metal chart, the pair unveiled Matthew Lowe as the group's full-time bassist. Then, on 9 April 2018, the full lineup was completed by the arrival of Alan Cassidy of The Black Dahlia Murder on drums. At the end of the year, Esoteric Malacology was included by Sputnikmusic in its list of "the top 50 albums of 2018".

== Members ==
- Matthew Moss – vocals, guitars (2012–present)
- Kevin Pearson – guitars (2012–present), bass, programming (2012–2018)
- Matthew Lowe – bass (2018–present)
- Alan Cassidy – drums (2018–present)

== Discography ==
Studio albums

- Born of Slime (2013, self-released)
- Gastronomicon (2014, self-released)
- Dim & Slimeridden Kingdoms (2015, self-released)
- Esoteric Malacology (2018, Willowtip)

Extended Plays

- Slug Life (2015, self-released)

Compilations

- The Cosmic Cornucopia (2015, self-released)
