= Confide =

Encrypted instant messaging application

- Original authors: Confide, Inc.
- Developer: Bending Spoons S.p.A.
- Initial release: 2013
- Operating system: Android, iOS, Windows, macOS
- Type: Encrypted instant messaging
- Website: getconfide.com

Confide is an encrypted instant messaging application for most major operating systems. It was first released in 2013, on iOS, and is known for its self-destructing messaging system that deletes messages immediately after reading. The platform offers both free and paid features for individuals and businesses.

In 2017, the news outlet Axios reported that it had gained popularity among, “numerous senior GOP operatives and several members of the Trump administration.” After receiving more media attention, there were concerns about the security of the app, as it is closed source and an independent review by Kudelski Security indicated it may use an older, less secure version of OpenSSL. The app's first full security audit found multiple critical vulnerabilities including impersonating another user by hijacking an account session or by guessing a password, learning the contact details of Confide users, becoming an intermediary in a conversation and decrypting messages, and potentially altering the contents of a message or attachment in transit without first decrypting it. WIRED reported that the encryption in Confide was based on the "PGP standard," and used Transport Layer Security.

In January 2018, Confide, Inc. developers announced their newly developed ScreenShieldKit SDK (Software Development Kit) which was originally intended only for the Confide application. The API allows developers to incorporate the same screenshot-proof functionality of Confide into their own applications by simply importing the SDK replacing UITextView and UIImageView – two commonly used iOS development components used to display data to end users. The SDK prevents screenshots by blanking out the data and supports protection from a variety of capture methods including screenshots, screen recordings, screen mirrorings, and even screenshots from Apple's Xcode (the main development platform for iOS).

Confide was referred to as an application that was used during communications between an accuser and the then Governor of New York Andrew Cuomo during a scandal in 2021.

== See also ==
- Comparison of instant messaging clients
- Signal
- Wire
