= Spheric Universe Experience =

French metal band

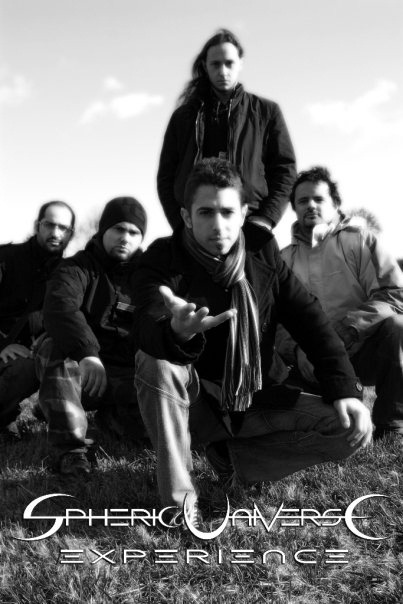
- Spheric Universe Experience - during the essence of progression tour in 2009

Background information
- Origin: France
- Genres: Progressive metal, symphonic metal
- Years active: 1999−Present
- Labels: Sensory Records, Nightmare Records
- Members: Fred Colombo, Vince Benaim, John Drai, Frank Garcia.
- Past members: Christophe BRIAND, Volodia Brice, Guillaume Morero, Nico Muller
- Website: www.sphericuniversexp.com/

Spheric Universe Experience is a French progressive metal band formed in 1999, which employ progressive metal with symphonic elements.

== Biography ==
The band was formed by guitarist Vince Benaim and John Drai decided to create a progressive metal band. The band did a handful of gigs in and around the southern parts of France, under the name Gates Of Delirium. It was not until 2001 that the band added a keyboardist, Fred Colombo, and a vocalist. The band changed their name to Amnesya and played a handful of concerts and produced one demo CD.

The band split due to musical disagreements in August 2002. Benaim, Drai and Colombo continued under the name Spheric Universe Experience. The band then spent eight months writing an album, which was recorded at a home studio in April 2003 with session vocalist Franck Garcia. The vocals were recorded in a professional studio, and Garcia's performance impressed the band so much he was invited to join on a permanent basis. The 2003 demo The Burning Box was sent to Intromental Management in Denmark, who offered them a deal.

Since then the band have gone through a number of lineup changes and have in total released five studio albums.

The band's third album, Unreal, received a three-star rating from AllMusic, whose reviewer, Alex Henderson, stated, "But unlike many prog metal bands, Spheric Univers Experience don't go out of their way to emulate Dream Theater or Rhapsody -- and although Unreal is melodic, it tends to be heavier than a lot of prog metal recordings."

== Discography ==
=== Studio albums ===
Year	Title
2005	Mental Torments - Nightmare Records
2007	Anima - Sensory Records
2009	Unreal - Sensory Records
2012	The New Eve - Nightmare Records
2022	Back Home

== Band members ==
=== Current ===
- Fred Colombo − Keyboard
- Vince Benaim - Guitar
- John Drai - Bass
- Frank Garcia - Vocals
- Romain Goulon - Drums

=== Former ===
- Samuel Boulade - Drums
- Volodia Brice - Drums
- Guillaume Morero - Drums
- Nicolas 'Ranko' Muller - Drums
- Christophe Briand - Drums
- Gabriel Odvad - Drums
