= Dawn of Destiny =

German metal band

- Origin: Bochum, Germany
- Genres: Power metal
- Years active: 2005−present
- Labels: Shark; Phonotraxx
- Members: Dirk Raczkiewicz; Jens Faber; Jeanette Scherff; Philipp Bock; Veith Offenbächer
- Past members: Tanja Maul; Ansgar Ludwig; Patrick Klose; Christian Tappe; Boris Freckel; Matt Bauer; Monika Wesely; Julio Pablo Da Silva; Felix Rodermund
- Website: www.dawnofdestiny.de

Dawn of Destiny is a German power metal band from Bochum, which incorporates elements of thrash, gothic, symphonic and death metal. Their latest album IX was released in November 2024.

== Biography ==
Dawn of Destiny was founded in Bochum (Germany) by the end of 2005. Back then, the band's line-up consisted of Tanja Maul (vocals), Veith Offenbächer (guitar), Jens Faber (bass), Dirk Raczkiewicz (keyboard) and Ansgar Ludwig (drums).

The band has toured on several gigs with Sabaton, Custard and Tankard. After many negotiations with labels, the band decided to sign with Shark Records. The record deal enabled the band to release their debut album ...Begins, which was already recorded back in 2006. It received a warm welcome by both the international press and fans worldwide.

At the beginning of 2008, the band supported the well-known American hard rock/glam metal/AOR/heavy metal band House of Lords on their European Tour, which led them to Belgium, the Netherlands and to the renowned Z7 in Pratteln (Switzerland).

In May 2009, Patrick Klose was chosen as the new drummer, replacing Ansgar Ludwig.

In June 2009, the recordings for the 3rd album Human Fragility began. The album was released on September 25, 2009.

In April 2010, vocalist Tanja Maul left the band.

In May 2010, drummer Boris Frenkel joined the band, replacing Patrick Klose. Also, the vocalists Monika Wesely and Jeanette Scherff joined the band.

In 2012, the band signed a record deal to release their fourth studio album through Phonotraxx Publishing. The album, entitled Praying to the World, was released on May 4, 2012.

In 2014, the band released their fifth studio album, entitled F.E.A.R. (Forgotten, Enslaved, Admired, Released), through Phonotraxx Publishing.

In 2015, the band's sixth studio album, called To Hell, was released through Phonotraxx Publishing.

In 2019 the concept album The Beast Inside was released.

This was followed by the 8th studio album Of Silence, released on June 24, 2022.

== Band members ==
=== Current ===
- Dirk Raczkiewicz – keyboards (2005–present)
- Jens Faber – bass, backing vocals (2006–present), guitars (2005–2006)
- Jeanette Scherff – lead vocals (2010–present)
- Philipp Bock – drums (2014–present)
- Veith Offenbächer – guitars (2016–present)

=== Former ===
- Tanja Maul – lead vocals (2005–2010)
- Ansgar Ludwig – drums (2005–2009)
- Patrick Klose – drums (2009–2010)
- Christian Tappe – bass (2005)
- Veith Offenbächer – guitars (2006–2015)
- Boris Frenkel – drums (2010)
- Matt Bauer – drums (2010–2012)
- Monika Wesely – lead vocals (2010)
- Julio Pablo Da Silva – drums (2012–2014)
- Felix Rodermund – guitars (2015–2016)

== Discography ==
- ...Begins (2007)
- Rebellion in Heaven (2008)
- Human Fragility (2009)
- Praying to the World (2012)
- F.E.A.R. (Forgotten, Enslaved, Admired, Released) (2014)
- To Hell (2015)
- The Beast Inside (2019)
- Of Silence (2022)
- IX (2024)

=== Demo EPs ===
- Demo 2006 (2006)
- Promo 2007 (2007)
- Limited Edition Demo 2011 (2011)
