= Trinity (Prototype album) =

Studio album by Prototype
- Released: February 12, 2002
- Studio: Utopia Studios
- Genre: Progressive metal; heavy metal; thrash metal
- Length: 43:56
- Label: WWIII; Massacre
- Producer: Prototype

Prototype chronology
| Trinity (2002) | Continuum (2006) |

Professional ratings
Review scores
| Source | Rating |
|---|---|
| BraveWords | 9/10 stars |

Trinity is the debut studio album by American progressive metal band Prototype. The album was released on February 12, 2002, via WWIII Music/AMC. The album was also released in Europe via Massacre Records; this version featured two bonus tracks that were not on the American version and were later included on the digital re-release.

== Track listing ==
All tracks written by Vince Levalois and Kragen Lum.

| No. | Title | Length |
|---|---|---|
| 1. | "Live a Lie" | 4:31 |
| 2. | "Pure" | 4:54 |
| 3. | "Utopia" (instrumental) | 2:42 |
| 4. | "Trinity" | 5:02 |
| 5. | "Shine" | 5:14 |
| 6. | "By Breeze" | 2:41 |
| 7. | "Dead of Jericho" | 6:51 |
| 8. | "I Know You" | 2:23 |
| 9. | "Mind in Motion" | 4:50 |
| 10. | "Relativity" | 4:48 |
| Total length: | | 43:56 |

European/digital re-release bonus tracks
| No. | Title | Length |
|---|---|---|
| 11. | "Half Life" | 5:21 |
| 12. | "Chrysalis" | 4:20 |
| Total length: | | 53:37 |

== Personnel ==
Credits are adapted from the album's liner notes.

Prototype

- Vince Levalois – vocals, guitar
- Kragen Lum – guitar
- Kirk Scherer – bass
- Pat Magrath – drums

Production

- Prototype – producers
- Eddy Schreyer – mastering

Artwork

- Travis Smith – artwork, package design and layout (with band)
- Alex Solca – band photography
