= Prototype (band) =

American progressive metal band

- Origin: Los Angeles, California, U.S.
- Genres: Progressive metal; thrash metal
- Years active: 1994–present
- Labels: Nightmare; Massacre; WWIII Music/AMC; MetalAxe; Sublevel
- Spinoff of: Psychosis
- Members: Vince Levalois; Kragen Lum; Kirk Scherer; Pat Magrath
- Past members: Stephen Gambina; Mike Bear; Damion Ramirez; Nic Ritter
- Website: prototypeonline.com

Prototype is an American progressive metal band from Los Angeles, California. The band was formed in 1994 by vocalist/guitarist Vince Levalois and guitarist Kragen Lum, who were then members of Psychosis.

Prototype has released three studio albums, one live album, two extended plays, three demos (with two others unreleased) and one compilation album, and collaborated on numerous other projects. Several of the band's songs have been featured in video games.

== History ==
=== Early years, Trinity and Continuum (1994–2007) ===
In January 1994, Psychosis guitarists Vince Levalois and Kragen Lum recruited bassist Stephen Gambina and drummer Damion Ramirez, and formed Prototype. The band recorded their debut release, the demo Seed, and released it later that year. The demo received praise and was referred to as a benchmark for modern aggressive/melodic progressive metal. The demo contained the songs "Seed", "Shine", and "Dead of Jericho". All three appeared on the band's first two studio albums. In 1996, Gambina and Ramirez left the band, and were replaced with bassist Mike Bear and drummer Pat Magrath. Gambina, remained with the band as a writer for their following release, and continued to do so thereafter. In 1997, the band recorded the EP Cloned and released it in 1998. The following year, bassist Kirk Scherer replaced Bear, completing a line-up that has lasted nearly a decade.

The band began work on their first studio album, Trinity, in mid-2000, and released it on February 12, 2002. The band covered Metallica's "Battery" on Phantom Lords: A Tribute to Metallica. Later that year, Magrath left Prototype, and the band re-enlisted former drummer Damion Ramirez. In 2004, an instrumental version of the song "Probe" was featured in MTX Mototrax. That year, five songs from Trinity, including "Pure", "Trinity", and "Shine", were featured in True Crime: Streets of LA. After three years of touring the United States, the band returned to the studio early 2005 to record their second studio album, Continuum, released on May 23, 2006. Ramirez recorded most of the drum tracks for the album, while Magrath returned to play on the song "Heart Machine". In 2006, the song "Synthespian" appeared in Tony Hawk's Downhill Jam, and, in 2007, the song "The Way It Ends" featured as a bonus playable song in Guitar Hero III: Legends of Rock. The song later appeared as a Rock Band Network downloadable content (DLC) song for Rock Band 3 in 2012, one year before the network's designer, Harmonix, announced that they would discontinue regular DLC updates for the Rock Band series. In 2007, Levalois, Lumm and Scherer were endorsed by Jackson Guitars and appeared in the product catalogues. Lum's custom seven-string Soloist was featured in the catalogue's custom shop guitars. Later that year, Lum also joined thrash metal band Heathen.

=== Catalyst and other projects (2008–present) ===
In early 2008, Ramirez left Prototype for the second time and was replaced by drummer Nic Ritter, who had been performing with thrash metal band Warbringer at the time. However, due to Ritter's commitments with Warbringer, the band re-enlisted Pat Magrath in 2009, and began working on their third studio album later that year. Catalyst was released on September 11, 2012, and saw a change in the sound of the band's music to a more thrash metal-inspired sound. In November 2012, the band released the compilation album Retrospect, which featured music from all five of the band's demos, including Seed. On March 4, 2013, the band released their second EP, The Way It Ends - Video Game EP, which featured exclusive mixes of the band's songs that have previously been featured in video games.

To celebrate the band's 20th anniversary, on March 4, 2014, Prototype released the live album Live At The Whisky 1998 online. The live album is a recording of the band's performance at Whisky a Go Go in Hollywood on December 5, 1998, where it was supporting death metal band Death. In late 2014, Lum recorded himself playing guitar solos from several of the band's songs and posted the videos on Prototype's official YouTube channel. Levalois later collaborated with former Control Denied vocalist Tim Aymar, former Watchtower vocalist Jason McMaster and Holy Grail vocalist James Paul Luna on the Control/Resist EP, Gods By Design, which was released on February 22, 2015.

== Musical style, influences and lyrical themes ==
In the band's early years, Prototype was known for its progressive metal sound, and nearly all of the songs from the band's first two studio albums, Trinity and Continuum, were in D tuning on standard six-string guitars. However, on the band's third album, Catalyst, the band expanded from their earlier progressive metal sound to a more thrash metal-inspired sound, with aggressive guitar riffs, deeper vocals, complex bass lines and fast drum patterns and blast beats. All of the songs from the album were in B♭ tuning on seven-string guitars. All of the band's lyrics focused on life, destiny and inner struggles, and their artwork and album cover designs are science fiction-themed and designed by graphic designer Travis Smith.

== Band members ==
Current members

- Vince Levalois – guitars, lead vocals (1994–present)
- Kragen Lum – guitars, backing vocals (1994–present)
- Kirk Scherer – bass, backing vocals (1999–present)
- Pat Magrath – drums (1996–2002, 2009–present)

Former members

- Stephen Gambina – bass (1994–1996)
- Mike Bear – bass (1996–1999)
- Damion Ramirez – drums (1994–1996, 2002–2008)
- Nic Ritter – drums (2008–2009)

== Discography ==
=== Studio albums ===
List of studio albums
| Title | Album details |
|---|---|
| Trinity | Released: February 12, 2002 (U.S.), January 27, 2004 (Europe); Label: WWIII Music/AMC (U.S.), Massacre (Europe); Format: CD, digital |
| Continuum | Released: May 23, 2006; Label: Nightmare; Format: CD, digital |
| Catalyst | Released: September 11, 2012; Label: Nightmare; Format: CD, digital |

=== Compilations ===
List of compilations
| Title | Album details |
|---|---|
| Retrospect | Released: November 20, 2012; Label: SubLevel; Format: Digital |
| The TK Tapes: Rehearsal Demos 1995–1997 | Released: May 1, 2020; Label: SubLevel; Format: Digital |
| What You Believe Might Not Be: The Best of Prototype | Released: May 12, 2023; Label: Self-released; Format: Digital |

=== Live albums ===
List of live albums
| Title | Album details |
|---|---|
| Live at the Whisky 1998 | Released: March 4, 2014; Label: SubLevel; Format: Digital |

=== Extended plays ===
List of extended plays
| Title | Album details |
|---|---|
| The Way it Ends: Video Game EP | Released: March 4, 2013; Label: SubLevel; Format: Digital |

=== Videos ===
List of videos
| Title | Album details |
|---|---|
| Live at the Whisky 1998 | Released: 2007; Label: SubLevel; Format: DVD |

=== Demos ===
List of demos
| Title | Album details |
|---|---|
| Seed | Released: 1994; Label: Self-released; Format: Cassette |
| Cloned | Released: April 1, 1998; Label: SubLevel; Format: CD, digital |
