= Ignitor (band) =

- Origin: Austin, Texas, U.S.
- Genres: Heavy metal
- Years active: 2003–present
- Labels: Cruz del Sur Music; Heavy Artillery; MVD Entertainment
- Members: Jason McMaster; Stuart Laurence; Beverly Barrington; Brendon Bigelow; Pat Doyle
- Past members: Erika Tandy; Annah Moore
- Website: myspace/ignitor

Ignitor is an American heavy metal band based in Austin, Texas.

== History ==
Ignitor was formed in 2003 by Erika Tandy (ex-Autumn Tears, vocals), Stuart Laurence a.k.a. Batlord (lead guitar, ex-Agony Column), Pat Doyle (ex-Offenders, ex-Pocket Fishrmen, drums), Beverly Barrington (ex-T.A.N.G., rhythm guitar), and Brendon Bigelow (ex-Death Of Millions, ex-T.A.N.G., bass guitar). In the spring of 2006, Beverly Barrigton left the band and was replaced with Annah Moore (ex-Boneglove, ex-Red Volution). The band has been compared to early NWOBHM acts, such as Judas Priest and Iron Maiden. In July 2005, the Austin Chronicle listed Erika Tandy number one in a list of top ten frontmen in Austin music.

In late 2007, Erika and guitarist Annah left the band for personal reasons. Founding member Beverly Barrigton was asked to rejoin the band and in October 2008. Then the band scored a coup de grace by recruiting legendary metal frontman Jason McMaster (Watchtower, Dangerous Toys) as lead vocalist, and recorded their second full-length album entitled The Spider Queen in 2009, and their third, "Year of the Metal Tiger" in 2012.

== Discography ==
- Take to the Sky (2004) self-released
- Road of Bones (2007) Cruz del Sur Music
- The Spider Queen (2009) Cruz del Sur Music/Heavy Artillery
- Year of the Metal Tiger (2012) MVD Entertainment
- Horns and Hammers (2024) Metal on Metal Records

A further limited run of Take to the Sky was produced on vinyl LP by Dies Irae Records of Brazil in 2005, which featured two additional tracks.

A further limited run of Road of Bones was produced on vinyl by High Roller Records of Germany in 2007 which was accompanied by a bonus single featuring two more tracks.
