= Gory Blister =

Italian technical death metal band

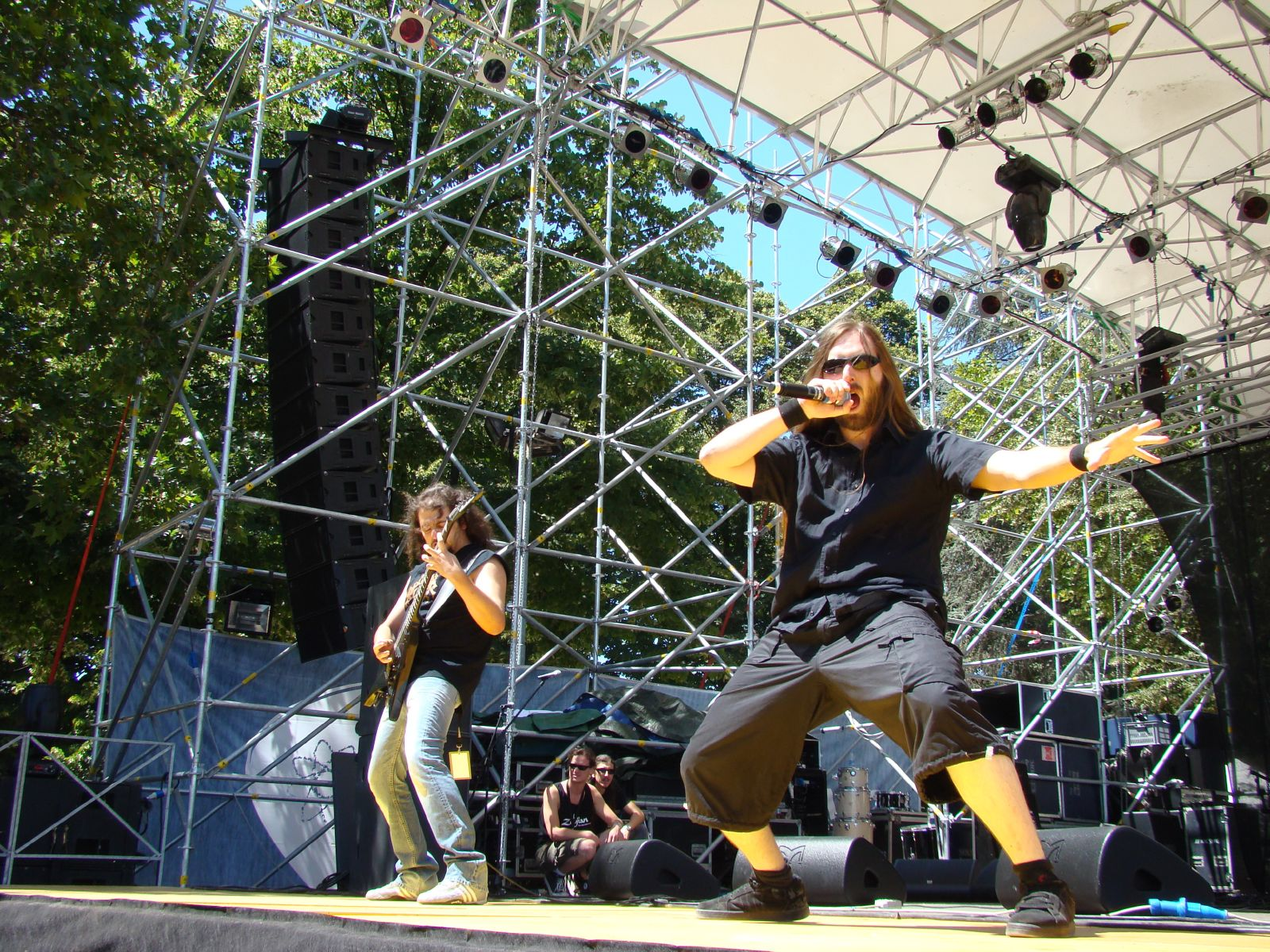
- Gory Blister, live at Evolution Fest 2007

Background information
- Origin: Milan, Italy
- Genre: Technical death metal
- Years active: 1991–present
- Label: Sliptrick Records Eclipse Records
- Members: Raff; Joe Laviola; John St John
- Past members: Dome; Michele Brustia; Daniel Botti; Bruce Teah; Fredrick; SyM; Christian; Clode; Adry Bellant
- Website: www.goryblister.com/

Gory Blister is an Italian technical death metal band from Milan, formed in 1991. Their lyrics range from psychology to modern literature/poetry and outer space.

== History ==
Formed in 1991, the band released two demos, Spoilt By Greed (1991) and Hanging Down the Sounds (1993), before their first EP, Cognitive Sinergy in 1997. In 1999, they self-released Art Bleeds. By 2004, the line-up included vocalist Adry Bellant, drummer Joe Laviola, bassist Fredrick, and guitarist Raff. In October 2004, AreaDeath Productions asked the band to donate their cover version of "1000 Eyes" to the Chinese Death tribute album Unforgotten Past – A Tribute to Chuck Schuldiner. They signed to Mascot Records in January 2005. Mascot released Skymorphosis in early 2006. In January 2007, Clode replaced Bellant. In February, they toured Italy with Amoral. Released April 6, 2009, by Mascot Records, their third album, Graveyard of Angels, features vocalist Domenico Roviello. After touring Italy to promote Graveyard, Gory Blister began writing new songs. Guitarist / vocalist Karl Sanders from U.S. death metal band Nile joined the band as a guest vocalist on two tracks for this fourth album. In April 2012, via BeckerTeam Records (a division of Scarlet Records), Gory Blister released Earth-Sick featuring new singer John. The new work featured 10 technical, brutal death metal songs. The band played several shows in Italy to promote Earth-Sick as headliner and supporting acts like Entombed, Sinister, Obituary. The band released their fifth album, The Fifth Fury, in 2014.

In 2023, Gory Blister completed their latest album, Reborn from Hatred, with a new production team and an emphasis on groove. The writing process was more meticulous, adapting every riff and drum-fill for artistic complexity and fan appeal. The warm guitar tone emphasizes mid-frequencies over electronic effects. Raff's custom Okume guitar features Seymour Duncan Black Winter pickups tuned to Drop C, plugged directly into an EVH 5150 Iconic amp and Marshall cabinet. Eclipse Records released the album on September 8, 2023.

== Band members ==
- John St John – vocals
- Raff – guitar, keyboards
- Fulvio Manganini – bass
- Gianluca D'Andria – drums

=== Former members ===
- Fabiano Andreacchio – bass
- Joe Laviola – drums
- Dome – vocals
- Clode – vocals
- Daniel Botti (Node) – vocals
- Bruce Teah – bass
- Fredrick – bass
- SyM – bass
- Chris – bass
- Adry Bellant (ex-Stygian, Darkness Thy Counts) – vocals

== Discography ==
=== Studio albums ===
Album title	Details
Art Bleeds	Released: 1999; Chart Positions: U.S. Sales: Label(s): Sekhmet Records; Singles: "Anticlimax"
Skymorphosis	Released: 2006; Chart Positions: U.S. Sales: Label(s): Mascot Records; Singles: "Asteroid"
Graveyard of Angels	Released: 2009; Chart Positions: U.S. Sales: Label(s): Mascot Records; Singles:
Earth-Sick	Released: 2012; Chart Positions: U.S. Sales: Label(s): Bakerteam Records; Singles:
The Fifth Fury	Released: 2014; Chart Positions: U.S. Sales: Label(s): Sliptrick Records; Singles:
1991.Bloodstained	Released: 2018; Label: Mighty Music
Reborn from Hatred	Released: 2023; Label: Eclipse Records

=== Other releases ===
- Spoilt By Greed (demo, 1991)
- Hanging Down the Sounds (demo, 1993)
- Cognitive Sinergy (EP, 1997)
