= Liberteer =

- Also known as: Citizen (2004-2011)
- Origin: Santa Cruz, California, U.S.
- Genres: Grindcore
- Years active: 2004–present
- Labels: Relapse
- Members: Matthew Widener
- Past members: Derrick; Mike
- Website: liberteer.bandcamp.com

Liberteer is the grindcore project of Santa Cruz, California–based musician Matthew Widener, best known for his work for Exhumed, The County Medical Examiners and Cretin. The project started out as a band under the name Citizen and went through a name change with Widener's shifting political views. It released its debut album, Better to Die on Your Feet Than Live on Your Knees in 2012 through Relapse Records.

Liberteer's lyrics mainly deal with anarchism. Compositionally, its sound also features unconventional elements such as brass and banjo sections, as well as influences from classical music, which Widener studies and composes.

== Members ==
- Matthew Widener – vocals, all instruments
- Derrick – bass (2004–2011)
- Mike – drums (2004–2011)

== Discography ==
Studio albums

- Manifesto for the New Patriot (2005, as Citizen)
- Better to Die on Your Feet Than Live on Your Knees (2012)
