= Shining (Swedish band) =

Swedish depressive suicidal black metal band

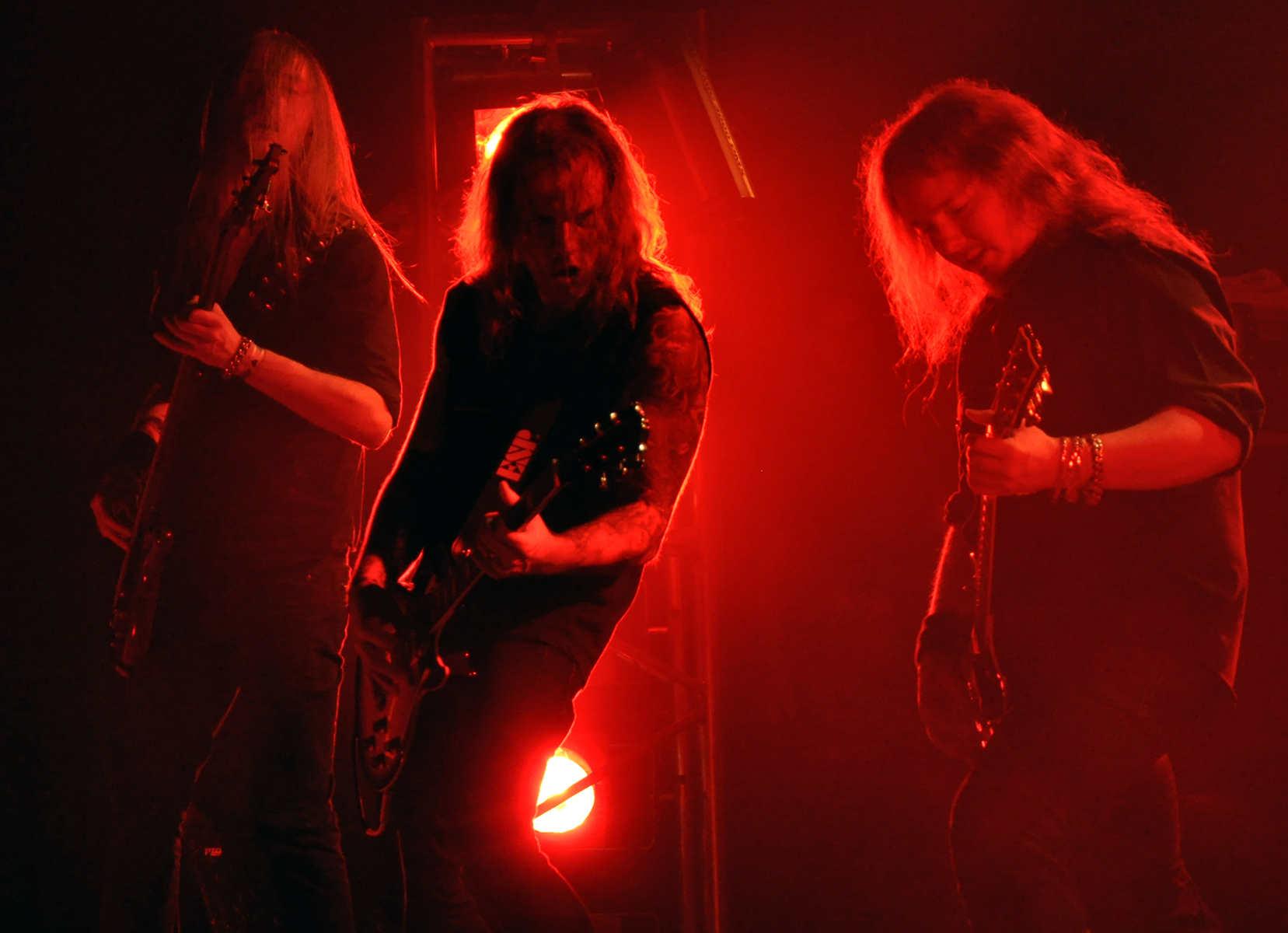
- Shining performing in 2012

Background information
- Origin: Halmstad, Sweden
- Genre: Depressive suicidal black metal
- Years active: 1996–present
- Labels: Spinefarm, Osmose, Dark Essence, Season of Mist, Napalm
- Members: Niklas Kvarforth; Peter Huss; Charles Hedger
- Past members: Full list
- Website: shininglegions.com

Shining is a Swedish depressive suicidal black metal band, formed by Niklas Kvarforth in Halmstad in 1996.

Shining's style is dark, aggressive and depressive, with progressive elements and personal and often suicide-themed lyrics. Kvarforth is the main composer of the band's music. His behaviour has led to controversies over the years.

Shining have released eleven studio albums.

== History ==
Kvarforth is the band's founder, main composer, and vocalist. Shining released their first EP, Submit to Selfdestruction, on which he played guitars and bass, in 1998. Kvarforth became the band's vocalist on their first album, Within Deep Dark Chambers (2000).

The band's name means "the path to enlightenment", according to Kvarforth.

The band released the albums Livets ändhållplats (2001) and Angst, Självdestruktivitetens Emissarie (2002), before splitting up in August 2004. Their fourth album, The Eerie Cold (2005), was intended to be their last, but the band reformed later that year with a new line-up for live shows.

Kvarforth disappeared in July 2006 and was presumed to have committed suicide. On 23 August 2006, the band stated on their website that Kvarforth had disappeared. The band continued with new singer "Ghoul," per Kvarforth's wishes.

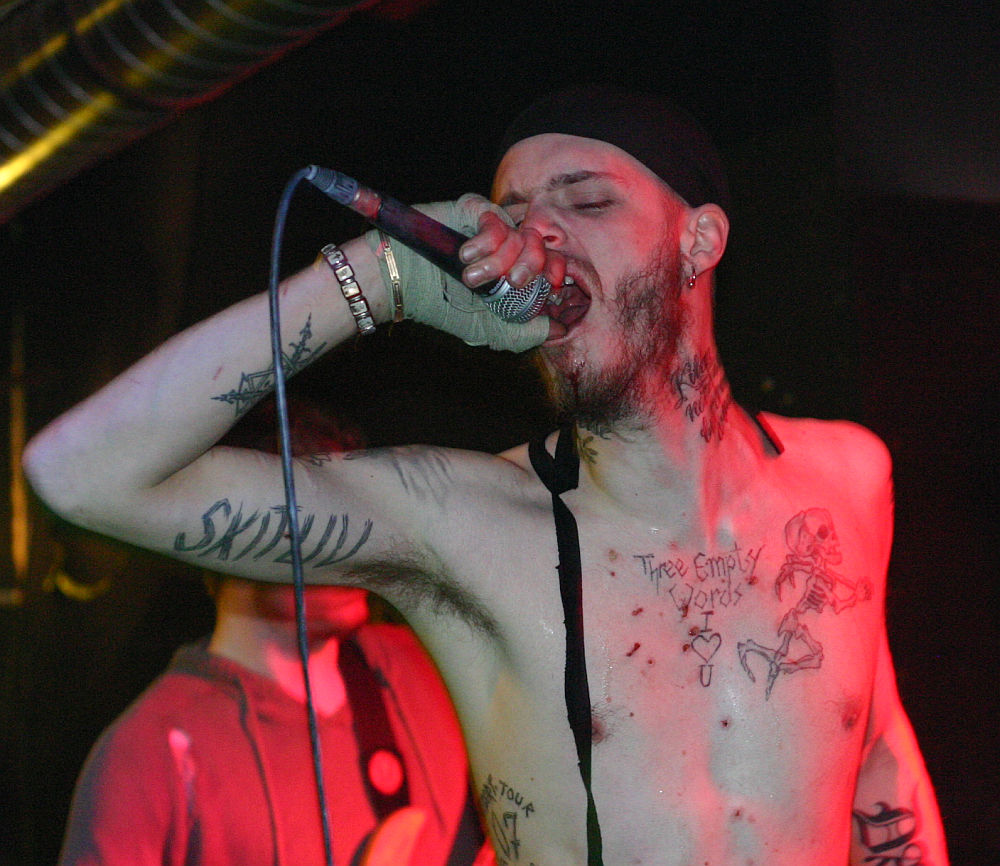
Lead vocalist Kvarforth in 2007

At a concert on 3 February 2007, at Diezel in Halmstad, Sweden, "Ghoul" was revealed to be Kvarforth. The concert was violent. Kvarforth occasionally fought the audience and guest vocalists Attila Csihar, Maniac and Nattefrost.

The band released their fifth album in 2007, Halmstad (Niklas angående Niklas), a reference to Kvarforth's hometown.

They released compilation album 8½ – Feberdrömmar I Vaket Tillstånd (2013), featuring re-recorded songs from 2001–2002 and different vocalists for 5/6 tracks.

The band released their ninth album, IX – Everyone, Everything, Everywhere, Ends, on 21 April 2015.

The band released their tenth album, X – Varg Utan Flock, on 5 January 2018.

The band released their eleventh album, Shining, on 15 September 2023.

== Musical style ==
Of course we support suicide, Shining support all that is negative in this bastard world of ours. We have had a couple of cases in the past with people whom have ended their lives under the influence or partially under the influence of our work and of course this is a true blessing indeed, yet we pray for increased numbers of fatalities.

— Niklas Kvarforth

Musically, Shining went from black metal with doom influences on their earlier work to a more progressive extreme metal sound with extensive use of clean guitars, pentatonic scales, guitar solos, different vocal styles and often tempo shifts and odd time signatures. Shining's music also contains several movie samples from films such as Prozac Nation, She's So Lovely, and American Psycho.

Shining openly promotes suicide and self-harm in all its forms (e.g. drugs) in their lyrics. The founder of the band, Niklas Kvarforth, has claimed, with contentment, there have been some cases of people committing suicide at least partially under the influence of Shining's music.

Vocalist Niklas Kvarforth wanted to "force feed" his listeners "with self-destructive and suicidal imagery and lyrics". In the beginning he used the term "suicidal black metal" for his music to separate himself from the "mediocre worms". However, he stopped using the term in 2001 because it had begun to be used by a slew of other bands, who he felt had misinterpreted his vision and were using the music as a kind of therapy rather than a weapon against the listener as Kvarforth intended. He said that he "wouldn't call Shining a black metal band" and called the "suicidal black metal" term a "foolish idea".

In a 2014 interview, Kvarforth insisted that "metal is bullshit" and insisted that Shining's music is accurately described as "evil fucking music."

== Band members ==
=== Current members ===
- Niklas Kvarforth (a.k.a. "Ghoul") – guitars, keyboards (1996–2004, 2004–present), lead vocals (2000–2004, 2004–present), bass (1996–2000)
- Peter Huss – guitars (2005–present)
- Charles Hedger – guitars (2022–present)

=== Former members ===
Vocalists

- Robert Ayddan (1998)
- Andreas Classen (1999–2000)

Guitarists

- Håkan "Inisis" Ollars (2002)
- John Doe (2005–2006)
- Andreas Casado (2005–2006)
- Fredric "Wredhe" Gråby (2006–2011)
- Sebastiaan Bats (2011)
- Euge Valovirta (2012–2017)
- Teloch (2018)
- Benny Bats (2017–2019)
- Silmaeth (2019)
- Kevin Storm (2019–2022)

Bassists

- Tusk (2000–2001)
- Johan Hallander (2005–2007)
- Phil A. Cirone (2001–2005, 2007–2008)
- Andreas Larssen (2008–2010)
- Christian Larsson (2010–2016)
- Alex "Impaler" Friberg – bass (2022–2023)

Drummers

- Ted "Impaler" Wedebrand (1998–2001)
- Jan Axel "Hellhammer" Blomberg (2001–2004)
- Rickard "Rille" Schill (2008–2010)
- Ludwig Witt (2005–2007, 2011–2012)
- Jarle "Uruz" Byberg (2007–2008, 2016–2017)
- Rainer Tuomikanto (2012–2016)
- Nicholas Barker – drums (2022–2023)

== Discography ==
=== Studio albums ===
- Within Deep Dark Chambers (2000)
- Livets ändhållplats (2001)
- III – Angst, självdestruktivitetens emissarie (2002)
- IV – The Eerie Cold (2005)
- V – Halmstad (2007)
- VI – Klagopsalmer (2009)
- VII – Född förlorare (2011)
- Redefining Darkness (2012)
- IX – Everyone, Everything, Everywhere, Ends (2015)
- X – Varg Utan Flock (2018)
- Shining (2023)

=== EPs and compilations ===
- Submit to Selfdestruction (EP, 1998)
- Dolorian/Shining (Split EP, 2004)
- Through Years of Oppression (Rarity compilation, 2004)
- The Darkroom Sessions (Rehearsal compilation, 2004)
- Shining/Den Saakaldte (Split EP, 2008)
- Lots of Girls Gonna Get Hurt (EP, 2012)
- 8 ½ – Feberdrömmar i vaket tillstånd (Compilation, 2013)
- In the Eerie Cold Where All the Witches Dance (Split EP, 2013)
- Shining on the Enslaved (Split EP with, Enslaved, 2015)
- Fiende (EP, 2017)
- Oppression MMXVIII (Compilation, 2020)

=== Singles ===
- "Förtvivlan, min arvedel" (2011)

=== Music videos ===
- "Förtvivlan, min arvedel" (2011)
- "Tillsammans är vi allt" (2012)
- "Vilja & Dröm" (2015)
