= Rami Haikal =

- Also known as: Rami
- Born: Rami Abdel-Hakeem Haikal; 12 September 1983 (age 42); Amman, Jordan
- Genres: Black metal, death metal, doom metal
- Occupations: Musician, software developer
- Instruments: Guitar, drums, programming, Mayones Regius Pro

Rami (born Rami Abdel-Hakeem Haikal on 12 September 1983) is a prominent musician in the Jordanian metal scene. He is well known for his distinct guitar work in the band Bilocate.

== Biography ==
Rami was born on 12 September 1983 in Amman, Jordan. He grew up in Amman, Jordan. When Rami was young, he met with Saeb Abu Al-Ragheb. The two soon became friends and started playing music together. Sharing the same passion for the Guitar instrument they tried to build custom made guitars in the age of 15.

Rami joined several local Jordanian bands but with no recorded achievements, later in the summer of 2004 and while having a practice session with one of the local bands, he met Hani Al-Abbadi who was the Bassist of the Jordanian band Bilocate, 2 weeks later Ramzi Essayyed from Bilocate called Rami to set up for a meeting in which they have offered him to join the band as a guitarist.

At that time, BILOCATE was already in the middle of composing the album Dysphoria and as soon as Rami joined, he started contributing in the composing process.

== Personal discography ==
- Bilocate – Summoning the Bygones (2012) (Guitar/Pre-production)
- Bilocate – Sudden Death Syndrome (2008) (Guitar/Pre-production)
- Bilocate – Dysphoria (2005) (Guitar)
- Bilocate – Dysphoria EP (2003) (Guitar)

=== As a guest musician ===
- BOUQ – Guest guitar solo in the track Jormungander

=== As a session musician ===
- Tyrant Throne – Live session guitarist
