= Urgehal =

Norwegian metal band

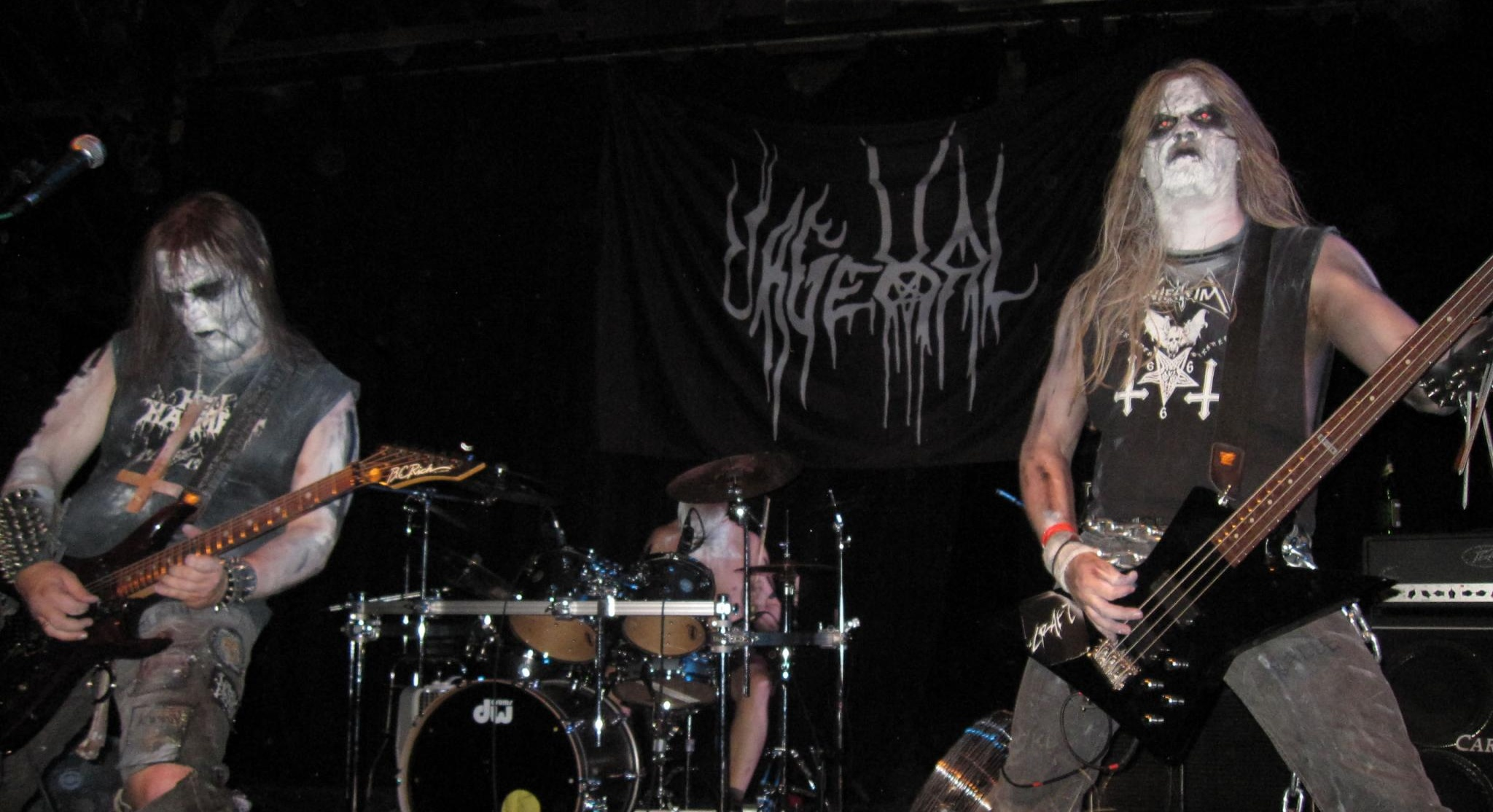
- Urgehal in 2009

Background information
- Origin: Hønefoss, Norway
- Genre: Black metal
- Years active: 1992–2016, 2022–present
- Label: Season of Mist
- Members: Full list

Urgehal (/ˈjʊərɡəˌhæl/) is a Norwegian black metal band formed in Hønefoss in 1992 by lead guitarist/vocalist Trond Bråthen ('Trondr Nefas') and rhythm guitarist 'Enzifer'. Before their split up in 2016, they released seven full-length albums, four EPs and two demos. The band has since reformed in 2022, in honor of former members.

== History ==
Urgehal was formed by Trondr Nefas and Enzifer in 1992. They released two demos in 1994 and 1995. Early in 1996 they got a record deal with the German label No Colours and recorded their debut album Arma Christi the same year. The follow-up, Massive Terrestrial Strike, was released in 1997. The band then switched to the label Flesh For Beast. The album Atomkinder was released in 2001 and the next, Through Thick Fog 'till Death, was released in 2003. Flesh For Beast then retired and their fifth album, Goatcraft Torment, was released in 2006 through its sister label Agonia Records. Shortly after, a 15-year anniversary album called The Eternal Eclipse was released, containing rarities and a large photo booklet which traces the band's history. In 2007, the band signed to Season of Mist. Most of the songs for the next album were written that year. However, due to internal problems, the recording was stalled. The album, Ikonoklast, was finally released in early 2009.

Guitarist/vocalist Trondr Nefas died in May 2012, aged 34. According to a statement from the band, the death was sudden but said that he "died a peaceful and natural death" in the woods "at one of his favorite places". Nefas was involved with a number of other bands. Most notably, he was the guitarist and bassist of black metal bands Beastcraft, Angst Skvadron, Vulture Lord and Bloodsworn.

== Style and sound ==
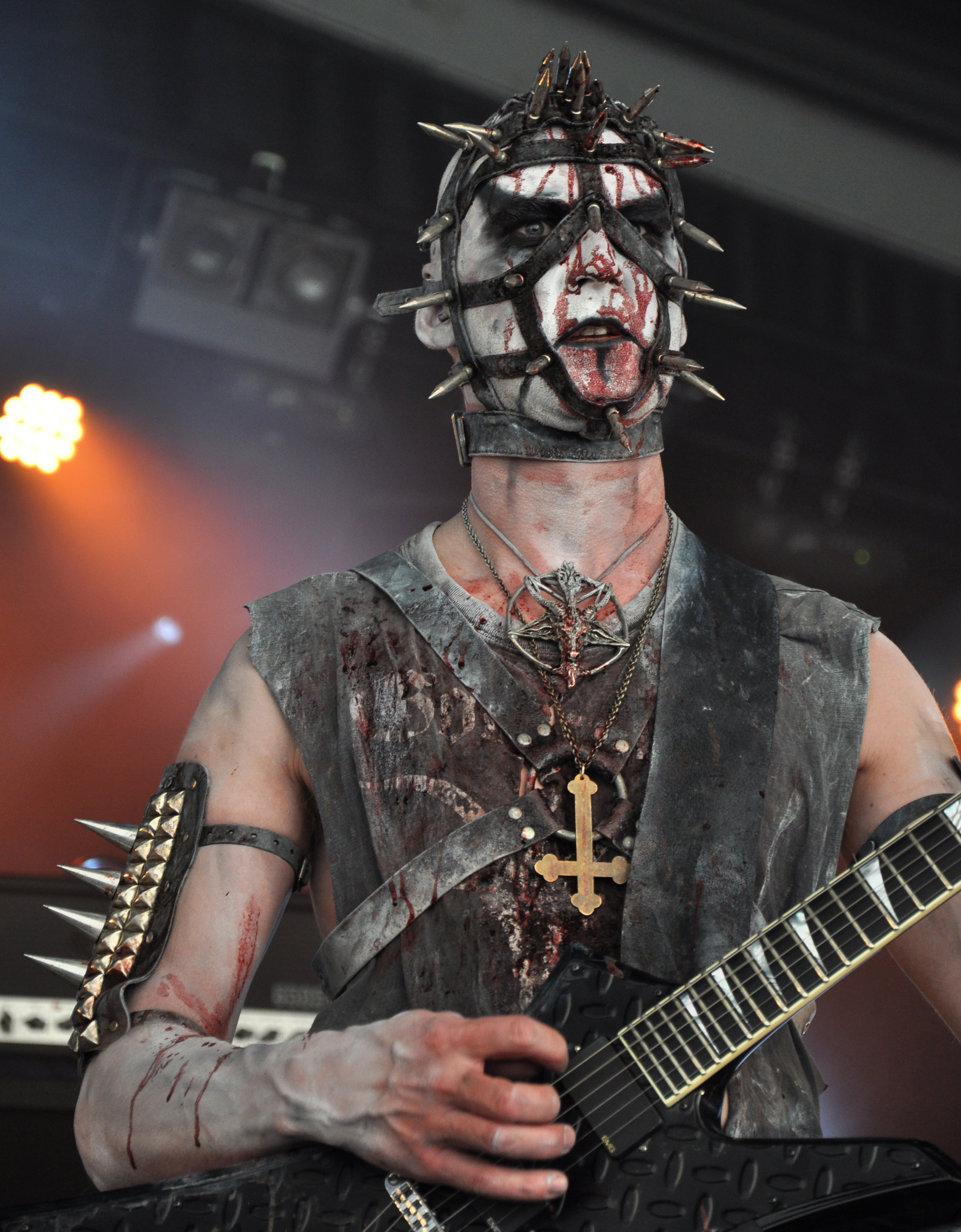
Guitarist Enzifer, live at Metal Mean Festival in Belgium (2011)

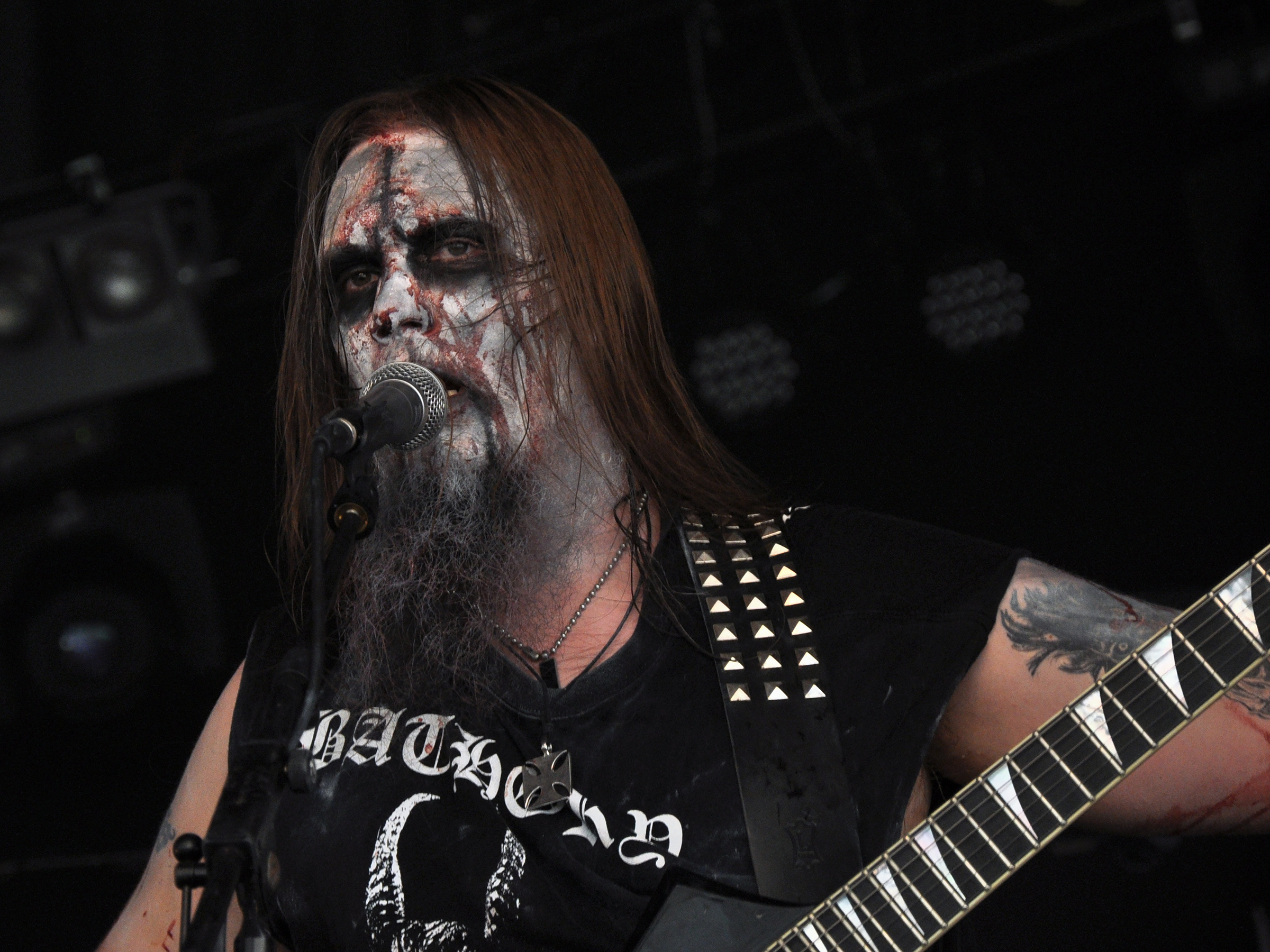
Frontman Trondr Nefas, who died in 2012

Their style and sound is strongly influenced by the Norwegian black metal scene of the early 1990s, and Enzifer has called Norwegian band Darkthrone their biggest inspiration. Other influences include "old-school heavy, thrash, speed, death and black metal [...] and the old South American extreme metal scene". Onstage, Urgehal wear traditional black metal attire, such as spiked wristbands, inverted crosses and corpse paint. Enzifer is also known for wearing a face mask with spikes protruding from it, which he says is used "to mirror my inner darkness". Urgehal define themselves as a "Satanic" band, explaining that they "use Satan as a biblical and metaphorical expression of the inner evil of Man". They explained their name as "an expression in old Norse mythology", describing it as "an endless deep and dark forest where all the evil dwells".

== Discography ==
=== Studio albums ===
- Arma Christi (1997)
- Massive Terrestrial Strike (1998)
- Atomkinder (2001)
- Through Thick Fog Till Death (2003)
- Goatcraft Torment (2006)
- Ikonoklast (2009)
- Aeons in Sodom (2016)

=== EPs ===
- Demonrape (2005)
- Satanisk Norsk Black Metal (2007) – split with Beastcraft
- Death Is Complete (2011)
- Maatte Blodet Flomme (2012) – split with Sarkom

=== Compilations and tribute albums ===
- A Norwegian Hail To VON (2005) – VON tribute split with Norwegian Evil, Amok and Taake
- The Eternal Eclipse: 15 Years of Satanic Black Metal (2007) – an anniversary album

=== Demos ===
- Ferd (1994)
- Rise of the Monument (1995)

== Band members ==
=== Lineup ===
- Enzifer – guitar (1992–2016, 2022–present), drums (1992–1997), keyboards (1995–2016), bass (2016)
- Mannevond – bass (2007–2012, 2022–present)
- Uruz – drums (1998–2008, 2011–2016, 2022-present)

=== Former members ===
- Nefas – vocals, guitar (1992–2012; died 2012), drums (1995, 2010), bass (2008)
- Chiron – bass (1992–1997; died 2019)
- Aradia – keyboards (1992–1995)
- Shregoth (Tomas Torgersbråten) – bass (2003–2006)
- Renton (Eirik Renton) – drums (2008–2010)
