= Gun Barrel =

- Origin: Germany
- Genres: Heavy metal
- Years active: 1998–present
- Members: Vinnie, Rolf Tanzius, Tom "Tomcat" Kintgen, Jan Niederstein, Paul Bendler
- Website: gunbarrel.de

Gun Barrel is a German heavy metal band formed in 1998 in Cologne, North Rhine-Westphalia. Gun Barrel was founded by Guido Feldhausen and Rolf Tanzius and released their first EP Back To Suicide (2000) with the line-up consisting of Guido Feldhausen (vocals), Rolf Tanzius (guitar), Holger Schulz (bass) and Florens Neuheuser (drums). They play traditional/old school heavy metal and they personally call their musical style "Power dive rock 'n' metal". So far they have released six studio albums, Power-Dive (2001), Battle-Tested (2003), Bombard Your Soul (2005), Outlaw Invasion (2008), Brace For Impact (2012) and Damage Dancer (2014). Rolf Tanzius is currently the only original band member.

== Band members ==
=== Current members ===
- Vinnie — vocals (since 2025)
- Rolf Tanzius — guitar (since 1998)
- Tom "Tomcat" Kintgen — bass (since 2002)
- Jan Niederstein — guitar (since 2018)
- Paul Bendler — drums (since 2024)

=== Former members ===
- Silver — vocals (on Live At The Kubana)
- Xaver Drexler — vocals (on Bombard Your Soul, Outlaw Invasion) - died on March 28, 2010.
- Guido Feldhausen — vocals (on Back To Suicide, Power-Dive, Battle-Tested)
- Manuel Strübing — vocals (2024)
- Holger Schulz — bass (on Back To Suicide, Power-Dive, Battle-Tested)
- Willi Tüpprath — bass (not on any album)
- Florens Neuheuser — drums (on Back To Suicide)

== Discography ==
=== Albums ===
- Power-Dive (2001, LMP)
- Battle-Tested (2003, LMP)
- Bombard Your Soul (2005, LMP)
- Outlaw Invasion (2008, LMP)
- Live at the Kubana -Live (2010)
- Brace for Impact (2012, Massacre Records)
- Damage Dancer (2014, Massacre Records)

=== Demos, singles and EPs ===
- Bomb Attack, demo (1999)
- Back To Suicide, EP (2000)
- Back To Suicide, single (2004)
