= Trond Bråthen =

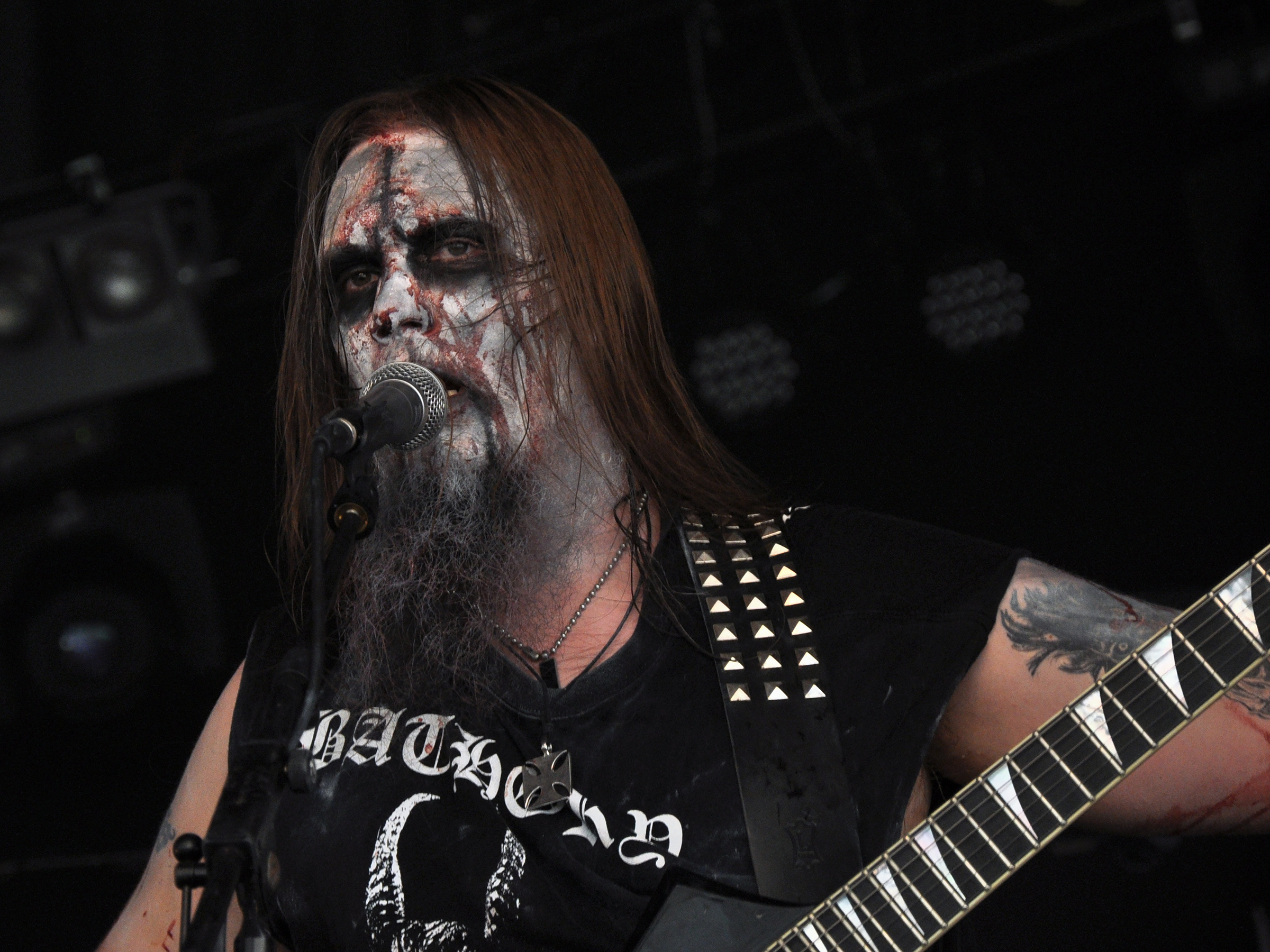
- Bråthen performing with Urgehal at the Metal Mean Festival in Belgium, 2011

Background information
- Also known as: Trondr Nefas; Alastor Nefas
- Born: 28 May 1977; Hønefoss, Buskerud County, Norway
- Died: 13 May 2012 (aged 34) Hønefoss, Buskerud County, Norway
- Genres: Black metal
- Occupations: Singer-songwriter, guitarist, bassist
- Instruments: Vocals, electric guitar, bass
- Years active: 1992–2012
- Labels: No Colours Records, Flesh for Beast, Agonia Records, Season of Mist
- Formerly of: Urgehal, Beastcraft, In Lingua Mortua, Angst Skvadron, Endezzma

Trond Bråthen (28 May 1977 – 13 May 2012), also known by the stage names Trondr Nefas and Alastor Nefas, or simply as Nefas, was a Norwegian singer-songwriter, guitarist and bassist. Despite being primarily known for his work as the vocalist and lead guitarist of black metal group Urgehal, which he founded in 1992 alongside Thomas "Enzifer" Søberg, he had numerous other projects as well, such as Beastcraft (in which he performed as "Alastor Nefas"), In Lingua Mortua, Endezzma (formerly known as Dim Nagel) and Angst Skvadron. In all of those side projects he collaborated with fellow musician and former Ásmegin member Lars Fredrik Frøislie.

On 13 May 2012 (at age 34), Bråthen was found dead at his home. According to his Urgehal bandmates, he most probably died of natural causes in his sleep. On the following day they released a statement via their record label, Season of Mist.

Prior to his death Bråthen was working on a documentary about the Norwegian black metal scene, entitled A Black Metal Year in Norway. Originally slated to a 2012 release, his death prevented it from being finished and released. (A very rough cut of the film is available at YouTube though.) Around the same time Urgehal began work on their seventh studio album, Aeons in Sodom, which remained unfinished until 2016 – it was eventually finished with the help of numerous guest musicians and released on 12 February.

He is survived by his brother, Thomas Bråthen, and by fiancée Octavia.

== Discography ==
=== With Kvist ===
- 1994: Demo

=== With Urgehal ===
For a more comprehensive list, see Urgehal § Discography

- 1997: Arma Christi
- 1998: Massive Terrestrial Strike
- 2001: Atomkinder
- 2003: Through Thick Fog Till Death
- 2006: Goatcraft Torment
- 2009: Ikonoklast
- 2016: Aeons in Sodom (posthumous)

=== With Beastcraft ===
- 2005: Into the Burning Pit of Hell
- 2007: Baptised in Blood and Goatsemen

=== With In Lingua Mortua ===
- 2007: Bellowing Sea – Racked by Tempest
- 2010: Salon des Refusés

=== With Angst Skvadron ===
- 2008: Flukt
- 2010: Sweet Poison

=== With Endezzma ===
- 2012: Erotik Nekrosis
