= 2018 in heavy metal music =

This is a timeline documenting the events of heavy metal in the year 2018.

== Bands formed ==
- Brand of Sacrifice
- Future Palace
- Major Moment
- Oceanhoarse
- Turilli / Lione Rhapsody
- Vended

== Bands disbanded ==
- Adagio (hiatus)
- Burzum
- The Charm the Fury
- The Color Morale (hiatus)
- Darkness Divided
- Devin Townsend Project (hiatus)
- Dew-Scented
- Diablo Blvd
- Dirge Within
- Ed Gein
- Katatonia (hiatus)
- Luca Turilli's Rhapsody
- Machine Head (hiatus)
- Manilla Road
- Morgoth (hiatus)
- Necrophagia
- Rush
- Sleeping Giant
- The Sword (hiatus)
- Tengger Cavalry
- Vattnet
- Young and in the Way

== Bands reformed ==
- Black River
- Bleed the Sky
- Bleeding Through
- Conception
- Mötley Crüe
- Static-X
- Tengger Cavalry
- Vomitory

== Events ==
- On January 5, Sodom announced that they had parted ways with guitarist Bernd "Bernemann" Kost and drummer Markus "Makka" Freiwald, who had been members of the band since 1996 and 2010 respectively. Later that month, bassist and vocalist Tom Angelripper announced that Sodom was rejoined by guitarist Frank "Blackfire" Gosdzik, and that Stefan "Husky" Hüskens and Yorck Segatz were revealed as the band's new drummer and second guitarist respectively.
- On January 22, Slayer announced plans to embark on a farewell tour after 37 years together.
- On February 12, Glenn Tipton announced that he had Parkinson's disease, with which he had been first diagnosed with a decade ago, and would no longer be touring with Judas Priest. He stated that he was still a member of the band despite his diagnosis and did not rule out future on-stage appearances. Producer and former Sabbat guitarist Andy Sneap was announced as his replacement for future tours.
- On September 13, vocalist Vince Neil announced that Mötley Crüe had reunited and recorded four new songs for the film adaptation of the band's biography, The Dirt – Confessions of the World's Most Notorious Rock Band.
- On September 28, lead vocalist and founding member Robb Flynn announced that Machine Head would do one final tour with longtime members Phil Demmel (guitarist) and Dave McClain (drummer), who had recently left the band. Flynn claimed that they were not breaking up but clarified that "this is the farewell tour of this lineup, this era of Machine Head. This is not the farewell tour of Machine Head."
- Nightwish embarked on a nine-month world tour, titled Decades: World Tour, featuring a special set for fans, including songs that had not been played in a long time. The tour began on March 9, 2018, and an accompanying 2CD compilation called Decades was released on the same day.

== Deaths ==
- January 3 – Josiah Boyd, former bassist of A Hill to Die Upon, died after a car accident at the age of 32.
- January 5 – Mikio Fujioka, guitarist of Babymetal, died from injuries caused by falling off an observation deck at the age of 36.
- January 9 – Paul Antignani, former drummer of Sworn Enemy, died from undisclosed reasons.
- January 10 – "Fast" Eddie Clarke, guitarist of Fastway and former guitarist of Motörhead, died of pneumonia at the age of 67.
- January 10 – Alfred Morris III, guitarist of Iron Man, died from undisclosed reasons at the age of 60.
- January 16 – Dave Holland, former drummer of Judas Priest, died from undisclosed reasons at the age of 69.
- February 1 – Marcin Walenczykowski, guitarist of Vesania and Rootwater, died from lymphoma at the age of 37.
- February 5 – Damien Percy, former drummer of Mortification, died from undisclosed reasons.
- February 7 – Pat Torpey, drummer of Mr. Big, died from Parkinson's disease at the age of 64.
- February 27 – Fabiano Penna, guitarist of Rebaelliun, died from undisclosed reasons.
- March 9 – Guillermo Calero, drummer of Wormed, died from undisclosed reasons at the age of 27.
- March 18 – Frank "Killjoy" Pucci, vocalist of Necrophagia, died from undisclosed reasons at the age of 51.
- March 28 – Caleb Scofield, bassist and vocalist of Cave In, Old Man Gloom, and Zozobra, died in car crash at age of 39.
- April 25 – Kato Khandwala, record producer, songwriter, mixer, and engineer of albums by Vimic, Pop Evil, and many other different artists, died from injuries sustained in a motorcycle accident at the age of 47.
- April 30 – Tim Calvert, former guitarist of Nevermore and Forbidden, died from amyotrophic lateral sclerosis at the age of 52.
- May 9 – Ben Graves, former drummer of Murderdolls, Dope, and Pretty Boy Floyd, died from cancer at the age of 46.
- May 29 – Josh Martin, guitarist of Anal Cunt, died from injuries sustained from falling off an escalator at the age of 45.
- June 6 – Ralph Santolla, former guitarist of Iced Earth, Deicide, Death, and Obituary, died after suffering a heart attack, falling into a coma, and being taken off life support at the age of 51.
- June 20 – David Bianco, Grammy Award-winning record producer and engineer of numerous artists, including Ozzy Osbourne, Danzig, Cathedral, and Trouble, died from complications of a stroke at the age of 64.
- June 22 – Vinnie Paul, drummer of Hellyeah and former drummer of Pantera and Damageplan, died from dilated cardiomyopathy and coronary artery disease at the age of 54.
- June 25 – Jake Raymond, former vocalist of Vital Remains, died from undisclosed reasons.
- July 7 – Bret Hoffmann, former vocalist of Malevolent Creation, died from colon cancer at the age of 51.
- July 27 – Mark "The Shark" Shelton, vocalist and guitarist of Manilla Road, died from a heart attack at the age of 60.
- August 10 – Jason “J-Sin” Luttrell, former vocalist of Primer 55, died from Hepatitis C at the age of 40.
- August 14 – Randy Rampage, former vocalist of Annihilator, died from a heart attack at the age of 58.
- August 14 – Jill Janus, vocalist of Huntress, died from committing suicide at the age of 42.
- August 24 – Carlos Denogean, drummer of Weedeater, died after suffering an aneurysm at the age of 30.
- August 25 – Kyle Pavone, vocalist of We Came as Romans, died from a drug overdose at the age of 28.
- September 5 – Richard Bateman, bassist of Nasty Savage, died from a heart attack.
- October 10 – Andie Airfix, graphic designer and cover artist for numerous artists, including Metallica, Def Leppard, Black Sabbath, and Judas Priest, died from undisclosed reasons at the age of 72.
- October 12 – Kade Dodson, former drummer of Abated Mass of Flesh and The Tony Danza Tapdance Extravaganza, died from undisclosed reasons at the age of 33.
- October 16 – Oli Herbert, guitarist of All That Remains, died from drowning after taking antidepressants and sleeping aids at the age of 44.
- October 23 – Willy Lange, bassist of Lȧȧz Rockit and Dublin Death Patrol, died from injuries sustained in a motorcycle accident at the age of 57.
- October 27 – Todd Youth, former guitarist of Agnostic Front, Murphy's Law, Danzig, and Warzone, died from undisclosed reasons at the age of 47.
- November 29 – Erik Lindmark, vocalist and guitarist of Deeds of Flesh, died from sclerosis at the age of 46.
- December 3 – Carsten Otterbach, former guitarist of Morgoth, died from multiple sclerosis at the age of 48.
- December 7 – Lucas Starr, former bassist of Oh, Sleeper, died from colon cancer at the age of 34.

== Albums released ==
=== January ===
Day	Artist	Album
4	Abigor	Höllenzwang (Chronicles of Perdition)
5	Shining	X – Varg Utan Flock
5	Summoning	With Doom We Come
5	Watain	Trident Wolf Eclipse
11	Y&T	Acoustic Classix, Vol. 1 (EP)
12	Avatar	Avatar Country
12	Black Veil Brides	Vale
12	Corrosion of Conformity	No Cross No Crown
12	Hamferð	Támsins likam
12	Heidevolk	Vuur Van Verzet
12	Leaves' Eyes	Sign of the Dragonhead
12	Mystic Prophecy	Monuments Uncovered (covers album)
12	Trespass	Footprints in the Rock
12	Ty Tabor	Alien Beans
12	White Wizzard	Infernal Overdrive
19	Anvil	Pounding the Pavement
19	Arkona	Khram
19	Black Label Society	Grimmest Hits
19	Cane Hill	Too Far Gone
19	Dalriada	Nyárutó
19	Of Mice & Men	Defy
19	Terror Universal	Make Them Bleed
19	Unshine	Astrala
25	Mike Shinoda	Post Traumatic (EP)
26	Agrimonia	Awaken
26	Hämatom	Bestie der Freiheit
26	In Vain	Currents
26	Labyrinth	Return to Live (live album)
26	Loudness	Rise to Glory
26	Lione/Conti	Lione/Conti
26	Machine Head	Catharsis
26	New Years Day	Diary of a Creep (EP)
26	Orphaned Land	Unsung Prophets & Dead Messiahs
26	Phil Campbell and the Bastard Sons	The Age of Absurdity
26	Philip H. Anselmo & the Illegals	Choosing Mental Illness as a Virtue
26	The Poodles	Prisma
26	Portal	Ion
26	Sleeping Giant	I Am
26	Tribulation	Down Below
27	Cemican	Guerreros De Cemican (single)
28	Rebellion	A Tragedy in Steel Part II: Shakespeare's King Lear

=== February ===
Day	Artist	Album
1	Gnaw Their Tongues	Genocidal Majesty
2	Long Distance Calling	Boundless
2	Manigance	Machine Nation
2	Misery Index	I Disavow (EP)
2	Saxon	Thunderbolt
9	The Atlas Moth	Coma Noir
9	Crescent	The Order of Amenti
9	Harm's Way	Posthuman
9	Lovelorn Dolls	Darker Ages
9	Therion	Beloved Antichrist
9	Voodoo Circle	Raised on Rock
14	Band-Maid	World Domination
16	Angra	Ømni
16	Cypecore	The Alliance
16	Dizzy Reed	Rock 'n Roll Ain't Easy
16	Ektomorf	Fury
16	Ethan Brosh	Conspiracy
16	Eyes Set to Kill	Eyes Set to Kill
16	For the Fallen Dreams	Six
16	Harakiri for the Sky	Arson
16	Heavatar	Opus II – The Annihilation
16	Letzte Instanz	Morgenland
16	Neal Morse	Life & Times
16	The Plot in You	Dispose
16	Pop Evil	Pop Evil
16	Senses Fail	If There Is a Light, It Will Find You
16	Visions of Atlantis	The Deep & the Dark
21	Royal Hunt	Cast in Stone
23	Deliverance	The Subversive Kind
23	Deströyer 666	Call of the Wild (EP)
23	Dimmu Borgir	Interdimensional Summit (EP)
23	Megaherz	Komet
23	MGT	Gemini Nyte
23	Necrophobic	Mark of the Necrogram
23	Nick Oliveri	N.O. Hits at All, Vol. 4
23	Salem	Attrition
23	Schwarzer Engel	Kult der Krähe
23	Sebastien	Act of Creation
23	Tengger Cavalry	Cian Bi
28	Hibria	Moving Ground

=== March ===
Day	Artist	Album
2	Andrew W.K.	You're Not Alone
2	Black Moth	Anatomical Venus
2	Blaze Bayley	The Redemption of William Black – Infinite Entanglement Part III
2	Michael Schenker Fest	Resurrection
2	Rolo Tomassi	Time Will Die and Love Will Bury It
3	Clown Core	Toilet
9	Between the Buried and Me	Automata I
9	Darkness Divided	The End of It All (EP)
9	Drudkh	Їм часто сниться капіж
9	Judas Priest	Firepower
9	Ministry	AmeriKKKant
9	Myles Kennedy	Year of the Tiger
9	Necrodeath	The Age of Dead Christ
9	Nightwish	Decades (compilation album)
9	Pestilence	Hadeon
9	Suicidal Tendencies	Get Your Fight On! (EP)
9	Three Days Grace	Outsider
9	Turbowolf	The Free Life
12	On Thorns I Lay	Aegean Sorrow
16	The Crown	Cobra Speed Venom
16	Little Caesar	Eight
16	Monotheist	Scourge
16	Northlane	Analog Future (live album)
16	Stone Temple Pilots	Stone Temple Pilots
16	Susperia	The Lyricist
23	The Absence	A Gift for the Obsessed
23	Axel Rudi Pell	Knights Call
23	Bad Wolves	False Flags: Volume One (EP)
23	Blessthefall	Hard Feelings
23	Borealis	The Offering
23	BulletBoys	From Out of the Skies
23	Eldritch	Cracksleep
23	Izegrim	Beheaded by Trust (EP)
23	Last Days of Eden	Chrysalis
23	Monster Magnet	Mindfucker
23	Mournful Congregation	The Incubus of Karma
23	The Sword	Used Future
23	Will Haven	Muerte
30	Alesana	The Lost Chapters (EP)
30	Augury	Illusive Golden Age
30	Ayreon	Ayreon Universe – The Best of Ayreon Live (live album)
30	Barren Earth	A Complex of Cages
30	Escape the Fate	I Am Human
30	Failure	In the Future (EP)
30	J.B.O.	Deutsche Vita
30	Light the Torch	Revival
30	Marc Rizzo	Rotation
30	Napalm Death	Coded Smears and More Uncommon Slurs (compilation album)
30	No One Is Innocent	Frankenstein
30	Primordial	Exile Amongst the Ruins
30	Rob Zombie	Astro-Creep: 2000 Live (live album)
30	Zeke	Hellbender

=== April ===
Date	Artist	Album
1	Omega Diatribe	Trinity
6	Bleed from Within	Era
6	Caliban	Elements
6	The Dead Daisies	Burn It Down
6	Hypno5e	Alba – Les Ombres Errantes
6	Kalmah	Palo
6	Kamelot	The Shadow Theory
6	Panopticon	The Scars of Man and the Once Nameless Wilderness
6	Underoath	Erase Me
6	Whyzdom	As Times Turn to Dust
6	Winterfylleth	The Hallowing of Heirdom
10	Autokrator	Hammer of Heretics
13	Behemoth	Messe Noire (live album)
13	Bonfire	Temple of Lies
13	Breaking Benjamin	Ember
13	Carpathian Forest	Likeim (EP)
13	Crematory	Oblivion
13	Derek Smalls	Smalls Change (Meditations Upon Ageing)
13	Emerald Sun	Under the Curse of Silence
13	Jen Ledger	Ledger (EP)
13	Motör Militia	World in Flames
13	Nekrogoblikon	Welcome to Bonkers
13	Rotten Sound	Suffer to Abuse (EP)
19	Cancer Bats	The Spark That Moves
20
20	Black Stone Cherry	Family Tree
20	Bullet	Dust to Gold
20	From Ashes to New	The Future
20	Gus G	Fearless
20	James Christian	Craving
20	Melvins	Pinkus Abortion Technician
20	Ross the Boss	By Blood Sworn
20	Sleep	The Sciences
20	Stryper	God Damn Evil
20	Temperance	Of Jupiter and Moons
20	Tesseract	Sonder
27	Anthrax	Kings Among Scotland (DVD)
27	The Armed	Only Love
27	Aura Noir	Aura Noire
27	Blitzkrieg	Judge Not
27	Blood Tsunami	Grave Condition
27	Cruachan	Nine Years of Blood
27	Dylan Carlson	Conquistador
27	Godsmack	When Legends Rise
27	Ingested	The Level Above Human
27	Kobra and the Lotus	Prevail II
27	Lee Aaron	Diamond Baby Blues
27	Power Trip	Opening Fire: 2008–2014 (compilation album)
27	Riot V	Armor of Light
27	Skindred	Big Tings
27	Tomorrow's Eve	Mirror of Creation III – Project Ikaros

=== May ===
Day	Artist	Album
1	Thou	The House Primordial (EP)
1	Twilight	Trident Death Rattle (EP)
2	Dead Cross	Dead Cross (EP)
4	Angelus Apatrida	Cabaret de la Guillotine
4	Dimmu Borgir	Eonian
4	Ihsahn	Àmr
4	Iron Angel	Hellbound
4	Iron Fire	Dawn of Creation: Twentieth Anniversary (compilation album)
4	Parkway Drive	Reverence
4	Shinedown	Attention Attention
4	Thy Catafalque	Geometria
4	The Word Alive	Violent Noise
10	Harley Flanagan	Hard-Core Dr. Know (EP)
11	Bad Wolves	Disobey
11	The Body	I Have Fought Against It, But I Can't Any Longer.
11	Child Bite	Burnt Offerings (compilation album)
11	Engel	Abandon All Hope
11	Jizzy Pearl	All You Need Is Soul
11	Lords of Black	Icons of the New Days
11	Praying Mantis	Gravity
11	Sevendust	All I See Is War
11	Silent Stream of Godless Elegy	Smutnice
11	Skinless	Savagery
11	Trauma	As the World Dies
15	Kekal	Deeper Underground
15	Powerglove	Continue?
18	The Afterimage	Eve
18	Amorphis	Queen of Time
18	At the Gates	To Drink from the Night Itself
18	Burn the Priest	Legion: XX (covers album)
18	Five Finger Death Punch	And Justice for None
18	Fragments of Unbecoming	Perdition Portal
18	Grayceon	IV
18	Overkill	Live in Overhausen (DVD)
20	Paleface Swiss	Chapter 1: From the Gallows (EP)
23	Snowy Shaw	White Is the New Black
25	Bleeding Through	Love Will Kill All
25	Candlemass	House of Doom (EP)
25	Don Airey	One of a Kind
25	Dream On, Dreamer	It Comes and Goes
25	Failure	Your Body Will Be (EP)
25	Hoobastank	Push Pull
25	Jonathan Davis	Black Labyrinth
25	Light This City	Terminal Bloom
25	Lordi	Sexorcism
25	Midnattsol	The Aftermath
25	Smile Empty Soul	Oblivion
25	Subsignal	La Muerte
25	Svalbard	It’s Hard to Have Hope
25	Witch Mountain	Witch Mountain

=== June ===
Day	Artist	Album
1	Alien Weaponry	Tü
1	Convictions	Hope for the Broken
1	Ghost	Prequelle
1	Kataklysm	Meditations
1	Powerflo	Bring That Shit Back! (EP)
1	Skinflint	Skinflint
6	Ribspreader	The Van Murders – Part 2
8	Acârash	In Chaos Becrowned
8	Eisregen	Satan Liebt Dich (EP)
8	Exmortus	The Sound of Steel
8	Refuge	Solitary Men
8	TNT	XIII
8	Tremonti	A Dying Machine
8	Yob	Our Raw Heart
8	Zeal & Ardor	Stranger Fruit
13	The Gazette	Ninth
15	A Sound of Thunder	It Was Metal
15	ASG	Survive Sunrise
15	Cor Scorpii	Ruin
15	Down Among the Dead Men	...And You Will Obey Me
15	Funeral Mist	Hekatomb
15	Jason C. Miller	In the Wasteland
15	Lizzy Borden	My Midnight Things
15	Madball	For the Cause
15	Mike Shinoda	Post Traumatic
15	Orange Goblin	The Wolf Bites Back
15	Tad Morose	Chapter X
21	Code Orange	The Hurt Will Go On (EP)
22	Craft	White Noise and Black Metal
22	Impending Doom	The Sin and Doom Vol. II
22	Khemmis	Desolation
22	Marduk	Viktoria
22	Nine Inch Nails	Bad Witch
29	Bullet for My Valentine	Gravity
29	Converge	Beautiful Ruin (EP)
29	Crystal Viper	At the Edge of Time (EP)
29	Death Requisite	Threnody
29	Fates Warning	Live Over Europe (live album)
29	Kevin Hufnagel	Messages to the Past
29	Night Verses	From the Gallery of Sleep
29	NonExist	In Praise of Death (EP)
29	Stormwitch	Bound to the Witch
29	Thou	Inconsolable (EP)

=== July ===
Day	Artist	Album
6	Atrocity	Okkult II
6	Bongripper	Terminal
6	DevilDriver	Outlaws 'til the End: Vol. 1 (covers album)
6	Dog Fashion Disco	Experiments in Embryos
6	Harley Flanagan	The Original Cro-Mags Demos (1982/83) (compilation album)
6	Immortal	Northern Chaos Gods
6	Kissin’ Dynamite	Ecstasy
6	Six Feet Under	Unburied
6	Taking the Head of Goliath	Taking the Head of Goliath (EP)
6	Vixen	Live Fire (live album)
9	Lithian	Eternal
13	Between the Buried and Me	Automata II
13	Black Fast	Spectre of Ruin
13	Bury Tomorrow	Black Flame
13	Chelsea Grin	Eternal Nightmare
13	Deafheaven	Ordinary Corrupt Human Love
13	Debauchery	In Der Hölle Spricht Man Deutsch
13	Hopesfall	Arbiter
13	Mr. Big	Live from Milan (live album)
13	Obscura	Diluvium
18	United	Absurdity
20	The Agony Scene	Tormentor
20	Daron Malakian and Scars on Broadway	Dictator
20	Finnr's Cane	Elegy
20	Jungle Rot	Jungle Rot
20	Powerwolf	The Sacrament of Sin
20	Skeletonwitch	Devouring Radiant Light
20	Tokyo Blade	Unbroken
20	Wisdom in Chains	Nothing in Nature Respects Weakness
27	Chris Caffery	The Jester's Court
27	Dee Snider	For the Love of Metal
27	Halestorm	Vicious
27	Michael Romeo	War of the Worlds, Pt. 1
27	Otep	Kult 45
27	Redemption	Long Night's Journey into Day
27	Tarja	Act II (live album)
27	Thou	Rhea Sylvia
27	Within the Ruins	World Undone (EP)

=== August ===
Day	Artist	Album
3	Crossfaith	Ex Machina
3	Lord of the Lost	Thornstar
3	Manticora	To Kill to Live to Kill
3	Soreption	Monument of the End
10	Enuff Z'Nuff	Diamond Boy
10	Erra	Neon
10	Mad Max	35
10	Primal Fear	Apocalypse
10	Sinsaenum	Repulsion for Humanity
10	Van Canto	Trust in Rust
17	Annisokay	Arms
17	Black Tusk	T.C.B.T.
17	Doro	Forever Warriors, Forever United
17	The Eternal	Waiting for the Endless Dawn
17	Moonspell	Lisboa Under the Spell (live album)
17	Parasite Inc.	Dead and Alive
17	Sid Wilson	Sexcapades of the Hopeless Robotic
24	Alice in Chains	Rainier Fog
24	The Amity Affliction	Misery
24	Ancestors	Suspended in Reflections
24	Lair of the Minotaur	Dragon Eagle of Chaos (EP)
24	Mantar	The Modern Art of Setting Ablaze
24	Mob Rules	Beast Reborn
24	Nonpoint	X
31	Beyond the Black	Heart of the Hurricane
31	Conan	Existential Void
31	KEN mode	Loved
31	Monte Pittman	Better or Worse
31	Monte Pittman	Between the Space
31	Omnium Gatherum	The Burning Cold
31	Sear Bliss	Letters from the Edge
31	Thou	Magus
31	U.D.O.	Steelfactory

=== September ===
Day	Artist	Album
7	Cauldron	New Gods
7	Clutch	Book of Bad Decisions
7	Counterparts	Private Room (EP)
7	Korpiklaani	Kulkija
7	Krisiun	Scourge of the Enthroned
7	Manimal	Purgatorio
7	Metal Allegiance	Volume II – Power Drunk Majesty
7	Monstrosity	The Passage of Existence
7	Nashville Pussy	Pleased to Eat You
7	Pig Destroyer	Head Cage
7	Satan	Cruel Magic
7	The Skull	The Endless Road Turns Dark
7	Skyharbor	Sunshine Dust
7	Suicidal Tendencies	Still Cyco Punk After All These Years
14	Archgoat	The Luciferian Crown
14	Bosse-de-Nage	Further Still
14	Brant Bjork	Mankind Woman
14	Deicide	Overtures of Blasphemy
14	Failure	The Furthest Thing (EP)
14	Fit for a King	Dark Skies
14	Grave Digger	The Living Dead
14	Treat	Tunguska
14	Turmion Kätilöt	Universal Satan
14	Uriah Heep	Living the Dream
21	Aborted	TerrorVision
21	Abysmal Torment	The Misanthrope
21	Avenged Sevenfold	Black Reign (EP)
21	Betzefer	Entertain Your Force of Habit
21	Black Majesty	Children of the Abyss
21	Dark Sarah	The Golden Moth
21	Dragonlord	Dominion
21	Hardcore Superstar	You Can't Kill My Rock 'n Roll
21	Mayan	Dhyana
21	Madder Mortem	Marrow
21	Slash featuring Myles Kennedy & The Conspirators	Living the Dream
21	Sumac	Love in Shadow
21	Therapy?	Cleave
21	Voivod	The Wake
26	Dir En Grey	The Insulated World
28	Anaal Nathrakh	A New Kind of Horror
28	Beartooth	Disease
28	Brainstorm	Midnight Ghost
28	Dynazty	Firesign
28	Gory Blister	1991.Bloodstained
28	Helrunar	Vanitas Vanitatvm
28	Necronomicon	Unleashed Bastards
28	North of South	New Latitudes
28	Once Human	Stage of Evolution (live album)
28	Revocation	The Outer Ones
28	Riverside	Wasteland
28	Stratovarius	Enigma: Intermission II (compilation album)
28	Terror	Total Retaliation
28	Vreid	Lifehunger
28	Vulcain	Vinyle
30	Rise to Fall	Into Zero

=== October ===
Day	Artist	Album
5	Author & Punisher	Beastland
5	Behemoth	I Loved You at Your Darkest
5	Coheed and Cambria	Vaxis – Act I: The Unheavenly Creatures
5	High on Fire	Electric Messiah
5	Ice Nine Kills	The Silver Scream
5	Monuments	Phronesis
5	Sylar	Seasons
5	Windhand	Eternal Return
5	Wrath	Rage
10	Chthonic	Battlefields of Asura
12	Aeternus	Heathen
12	Atreyu	In Our Wake
12	Beyond Creation	Algorythm
12	Dragony	Masters of the Multiverse
12	Gama Bomb	Speed Between the Lines
12	Impellitteri	The Nature of the Beast
12	Iron Reagan	Dark Days Ahead (EP)
12	London	Call That Girl
12	Nazareth	Tattooed on My Brain
12	Polyphia	New Levels New Devils
12	Racetraitor	2042
12	Seventh Wonder	Tiara
12	Skálmöld	Sorgir
12	Tank	Sturmpanzer
12	Terrorizer	Caustic Attack
12	Uncle Acid & the Deadbeats	Wasteland
12	Verni	Barricade
15	Heir Apparent	The View from Below
16	Tourniquet	Gazing at Medusa
19	Ace Frehley	Spaceman
19	Amaranthe	Helix
19	Disturbed	Evolution
19	Gorod	Aethra
19	Marty Friedman	One Bad M.F. Live!! (live album)
19	Saliva	10 Lives
19	Shining	Animal
19	Soulfly	Ritual
19	Sunflower Dead	C O M A
26	Bloodbath	The Arrow of Satan Is Drawn
26	The Browning	Geist
26	Chevelle	12 Bloody Spies (compilation album)
26	Cryptopsy	The Book of Suffering – Tome II (EP)
26	Fifth Angel	The Third Secret
26	Haken	Vector
26	Hate Eternal	Upon Desolate Sands
26	Icarus Witch	Goodbye Cruel World
26	Into Eternity	The Sirens
26	KMFDM	Live in the USSA (live album)
26	Mass Hysteria	Maniac
26	Sirenia	Arcane Astral Aeons
26	Skull Fist	Way of the Road
26	Ted Poley	Modern Art
26	Unleashed	The Hunt for White Christ
26	Warrel Dane	Shadow Work

=== November ===
Day	Artist	Album
2	The Algorithm	Compiler Optimization Techniques
2	Arsis	Visitant
2	Audiotopsy	The Real Now
2	Cancer	Shadow Gripped
2	Farmer Boys	Born Again
2	Hank von Hell	Egomania
2	Hollywood Undead	Psalms (EP)
2	The Ocean	Phanerozoic I: Palaeozoic
2	Opeth	Garden of the Titans: Live at Red Rocks Amphitheater (live album)
2	Sick of It All	Wake the Sleeping Dragon!
2	Silent Planet	When the End Began
2	Tenacious D	Post-Apocalypto
9	All That Remains	Victim of the New Disease
9	Architects	Holy Hell
9	Ashes of Ares	Well of Souls
9	August Burns Red	Winter Wilderness (EP)
9	Cripple Bastards	La Fine Cresce Da Dentro
9	Cult Leader	A Patient Man
9	David Reece	Resilient Heart
9	Einherjer	Norrøne Spor
9	Evoken	Hypnagogia
9	Lacuna Coil	The 119 Show – Live in London (live album)
9	Psycroptic	As the Kingdom Drowns
9	Stephen Pearcy	View to a Thrill
16	All Hail the Yeti	Highway Crosses
16	Amon Amarth	The Pursuit of Vikings: 25 Years in the Eye of the Storm (live album)
16	Artillery	The Face of Fear
16	Memphis May Fire	Broken
16	Nita Strauss	Controlled Chaos
16	P.O.D.	Circles
16	Sigh	Heir to Despair
17	Opera IX	The Gospel
23	Cattle Decapitation	Medium Rarities (compilation album)
23	Conception	My Dark Symphony (EP)
23	Death Ray Vision	Negative Mental Attitude
23	Electric Boys	The Ghost Ward Diaries
23	In the Woods...	Cease the Day
23	Sinbreed	IV
23	Sodom	Partisan (EP)
23	Unearth	Extinction(s)
30	Chrome Division	One Last Ride
30	Emigrate	A Million Degrees
30	Nachtmystium	Resilient (EP)

=== December ===
Day	Artist	Album
5	Lovebites	Clockwork Immortality
7	Alcatrazz	Parole Denied – Tokyo 2017 (live album)
7	Apocalyptica	Plays Metallica by Four Cellos – A Live Performance (live album)
7	Carnifex	Bury Me in Blasphemy (EP)
7	Dark Moor	Origins
7	Graf Orlock	Examination of Violent Cinema, Volume 1
7	Haken	L+1VE (EP)
7	Jason Becker	Triumphant Hearts
7	Metal Church	Damned If You Do
7	Myrkur	Juniper (EP)
7	Steelheart	Rock'n Milan (live album)
14	Venom	Storm the Gates
14	Volbeat	Let's Boogie! Live from Telia Parken (live album)
17	Lionize	Cyber Attackers (EP)
21	Blood Feast	Chopped, Sliced and Diced (EP)
21	Jon Schaffer's Purgatory	Purgatory (EP)

Preceded by 2017	Heavy Metal Timeline; 2018	Succeeded by 2019
