= The Gipsy Way =

EP by Ektomorf
- Released: 21 June 2010
- Genre: Groove metal, alternative metal
- Label: AFM

Ektomorf chronology
What Doesn't Kill Me... (2009)	The Gipsy Way (2010)	Redemption (2010)

The Gipsy Way is the first EP by Hungarian heavy metal band Ektomorf, released in June 2010. The song "We Die Young" is an Alice in Chains cover and "Rusty Cage" a Soundgarden cover.

== Track listing ==
1. "We Die Young" (Alice in Chains cover)
2. "Rusty Cage" (Soundgarden cover)
3. "Ne Add Fel"
