= Vivid Black =

Studio album by Ektomorf
- Released: 8 December 2023
- Genre: Groove metal
- Length: 34:22
- Label: AFM
- Producer: Tue Madsen, Zoltán Farkas

Ektomorf chronology
Reborn (2021)	Vivid Black (2023)	Heretic (2025)

Vivid Black is the sixteenth album by the Hungarian groove metal band Ektomorf.

== Reception ==
The album abandoned the ...And Justice for All direction that Ektomorf took with their previous album, 2021's Reborn. In reviewing Vivid Black, Vampster concluded that "if you're yearning for more—be it a broader perspective or even consistent musical evolution—then you're barking up the wrong tree. It's a bit of a shame that the band abandoned the promising path of their predecessor so quickly, but at least we now know for sure what to expect from Zoltán Farkas and his band". Metal.de gave 6 of 10 to Vivid Black that showcased the "familiar sound" of Ektomorf, though the "influences of Roma music have receded significantly into the background". On the positive side, it contained "considerable force, allowing the deep guitars and pounding drums to really shine", though it did not stand out from Aggressor or Fury.

Norway Rock Magazine only gave 2.5 out of 6, calling it a "dumb record" with "simple, generic groove riffs" and vocals with a tendency towards nu metal and "somethingcore". The album was "heavy and driving", however, with a "massive guitar sound". Heavymetal.dk gave 3 of 10, calling the sound an uncreative copy of Machine Head and Slipknot. Admittedly there were "loads of fine riffs, and the album is well produced, but the songwriting is immeasurably primitive".

Rock Hard was far more admissible, bestowing an 8 out of 10 rating on Vivid Black. Powermetal.de gave the same rating, with the reviewer finding it "outrageously groovy" already from the start. The album was a "truly epic experience that will put your neck muscles to the test". The Slipknot "influence suits the Ektomorf sound very well", the reviewer opined. Dead Rhetoric was near the same end of the scale with their 7/10 score. Metal Hammer Germany gave a good rating too, 5 out of 7.

== Track listing ==
1. "I'm Your Last Hope (The Rope Around Your Neck)" – 3:32
2. "Die" – 3:09
3. "Never Be the Same Again" – 2:33
4. "I Don't Belong to You" – 2:53
5. "Fade Away" – 4:29
6. "You and Me" – 2:48
7. "Vivid Black" – 4:20
8. "The Best of Me" – 3:02
9. "You Belong There" – 3:40
10. "REM" – 3:56

== Personnel ==
- Zoltán Farkas – vocals, guitar
- Szebasztián Simon – guitar
- Csaba Zahorán – bass
- Dániel Szabó – drums
