= El Puerto Records =

German record label

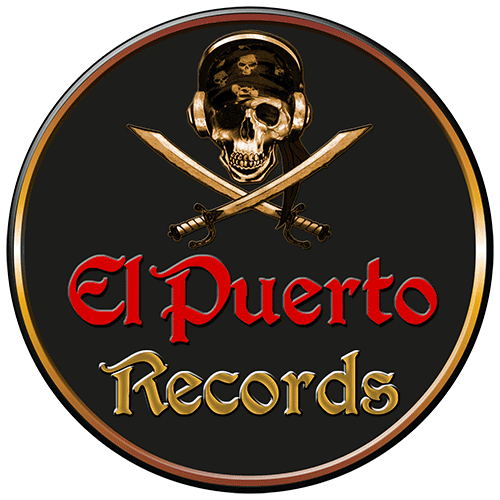
- Founded: 2014
- Founder: Bernd Stelzer, Torsten Ihlenfeld
- Distributors: Edel Music, Kontor New Media
- Genre: Heavy metal, hard rock, thrash metal, rock, glam rock, gothic rock, rock'n'roll, symphonic music
- Country of origin: Germany
- Location: Ulm
- Official website: https://el-puerto-records.com/en/

El Puerto Records is a German music label that was founded in 2014 in Gerstetten near Ulm by Bernd Stelzer and Torsten Ihlenfeld. The main focus of the label is on rock / hard rock / heavy metal. In the beginning the distribution extends over Europe (Soulfood Music) and North America (Soulfood-Amped). In 2022, the distribution changed in favor of Edel Music and Kontor New Media.

== History ==
The beginnings of El Puerto Records go back to 2011 when Stormwitch founder Harald Spengler (alias Lee Tarot) teamed up with co-founders Stefan Kauffmann (git) and Peter Langer (drums) to record new songs. After Spengler's death in 2013, the decision was made to continue Spengler's musical legacy under the name Witchbound. This also became the first release by El Puerto Records in 2015. This was followed in 2016 by the releases of "The Phans" (vintage rock) and Stepfather Fred (alternative rock), two bands from southern Germany, which the label noticed primarily because of their live qualities.

When Matt Bischof joined the promotion department, the label began to become increasingly international. With the American singer David Reece (ex-Accept) and his Sainted Sinners (including Frank Pané (Bonfire) and Ferdy Doernberg), another big name joined the label in 2016. In 2017, the European distribution of Beasto Blanco was taken over by two of the band members, Alice Cooper bassist Chuck Garric and Calico Cooper, the daughter of Alice Cooper. Souldrinker and Mystic Prophecy guitarist Markus Pohl made a debut in the same year. The increasing attention in the music scene led to larger and more experienced bands joining the label in 2018: Undertow and the German thrash metal band Necronomicon. With the Italians Alight and the Swiss Bloodlost, other bands joined. The year was rounded off by Mission in Black and Ginger Red. At the turn of the year 2019, Bodo Schopf (drummer from Michael Schenker and The Sweet) and David Readman (Pink Cream 69, Voodoo Circle, Almanac) joined Pendulum of Fortune and Dark Blue Inc. u. a. with Frank Pané (Bonfire), Göran Edman (Ex-Malmsteen), Hal Patino (Maryann Cotton, Ex-King Diamond and Ex-Pretty Maids). The latter came up with a guest appearance by Ian Paice (Deep Purple) on the debut CD. The orientation of the labels, both to oblige bands from the immediate region and to perform internationally, ensured that more international acts joined the label in 2019: Nightqueen from Belgium and, for the first time, a band from Australia - Envenomed. In the summer of 2019, another old friend came with the Austrians Garagedays and the Sons Of Sounds from the Karlsruhe area: David Reece returned to El Puerto Records after a short interlude to continue his solo career there, as well as the Danish / US combo Maryann Cotton. Also from Denmark: Phonomics. But expansion continued in 2020 as well. Welicoruss from Siberia joined them, followed by two German metal bands (Scorged - Saarland, Red To Grey - Bavaria). With Last Days Of Eden (Symphonic Metal) and Dieversity (Melodic Death Metal) the label showed its versatility in the following years. In 2022, the decision was made to improve the digital positioning of the label. The decision was made to switch to Edel Music and Kontor New Media (digital), which enabled further renowned bands such as Dawn of Destiny, Crossplane, Dezperadoz and Vanish as well as the newcomers Dying Phoenix. 2023 began with a bang when Dispyria with Zak Stevens (ex-Savatage), Ralf Scheepers (Primal Fear) and Carsten "Lizard" Schulz as well as The Revenants (with Michelle Darkness / End Of Green) and Pontillo and The Vintage Crew (Gianni Pontillo / Victory) joined the label. The power metal albums by Elvenpath, Generation Steel and Stormage were also released under the pirate banner! 2024 started with the signings of the Finns Lost in Grey, as well as My Merry Machine and the comeback of Pussy Sisster. Also Aeva Maurelle and Ancient Curse joined the pirate label. In the years that followed, El Puerto Records remained a launching pad both for talented newcomers like Fireborn and Caroline Breitler and for established bands like Bangalore Choir!

== Bands ==
- Aeva Maurelle (DE)
- Alight (IT)
- Ancient Curse (DE)
- Bangalore Choir (US)
- Beasto Blanco (US)
- Blind The Eye (PT)
- Bloodlost (CH)
- Caroline Breitler (CH)
- Crossplane (DE)
- Dark Blue Inc. (DE, SE, DK)
- Dawn_of_Destiny (DE)
- Dezperadoz (DE)
- Dieversity (DE)
- Dispyria (DE)
- Dust & Bones (DE)
- Dying Phoenix (DE)
- Elvenpath (DE)
- Emerald Sun (GR)
- Envenomed (AU)
- Fireborn (DE)
- Garagedays (AT)
- Generation Steel (DE)
- Ginger Red (DE)
- Klaw (CH)
- Last Days of Eden (ES)
- Lost In Grey (FI)
- Lucid Dreaming (DE)
- Maryann Cotton (US/DK)
- Mean Streak (SE)
- Mission in Black (DE)
- My Merry Machine (DE)
- Necronomicon (DE)
- Neverland Train (DE)
- Nightqueen (BE)
- Pendulum Of Fortune (DE)
- Phonomik (DK)
- Pontillo And The Vintage Crew (CH)
- Pussy Sisster (DE)
- Red To Grey (DE)
- Reece (US)
- Sainted Sinners (US, DE, HU)
- Scorged (DE)
- Sons of Sounds (DE)
- Souldrinker (DE)
- Soul Syndicate (SWE)
- Stepfather Fred (DE)
- Stormage (DE)
- The Phans (DE)
- The Revenants (DE)
- Undertow (DE)
- Vansih (DE)
- Visionatica (DE)
- Welicoruss (RU)
- Witchbound (DE)
