= The Acoustic =

Studio album by Ektomorf
- Released: 17 February 2012
- Genre: Acoustic rock
- Label: AFM

Ektomorf chronology
Redemption (2010)	The Acoustic (2012)

The Acoustic is the tenth studio album by Hungarian heavy metal band Ektomorf, released on 17 February 2012. It features newly recorded songs from previous records, new songs, and two cover songs by Lynyrd Skynyrd and Johnny Cash. The artwork was done by Tim Eckhorst.

== Track listing ==
1. "I Know Them"
2. "I'm in Hate"
3. "Be Free"
4. "Redemption"
5. "Simple Man" (Lynyrd Skynyrd cover)
6. "To Smoulder"
7. "Folsom Prison Blues" (Johnny Cash cover)
8. "Again"
9. "Through Your Eyes"
10. "Fate"
11. "Stigmatized"
12. "Who Can I Trust"
