= Nocturnal Birding =

Studio album by Author & Punisher
- Released: October 3, 2025
- Studio: K Street Recordings
- Length: 34:11
- Label: Relapse
- Producer: Will Putney

Author & Punisher chronology
Krüller (2022)	Nocturnal Birding (2025)

Singles from Nocturnal Birding
- 1. "Titanis" Released: August 7, 2025; 2. "Thrush" Released: August 26, 2025

Nocturnal Birding is the eighth studio album by industrial metal band Author & Punisher, released on October 3, 2025 via Relapse Records. Produced by Will Putney, the album features contributions from Kuntari, Fange and Megan Oztrosits of Couch Slut, as well as Douglas Sabolick co-writing and performing guitars and backing vocals on the entire album, marking the first time the project expanded into a duo.

Professional ratings
Review scores
Source	Rating
Kerrang!	3/5
New Noise Magazine	3.5/5 stars

== Track listing ==
All tracks are written by Tristan Shone and Douglas Sabolick.

No.	Title	Length
1.	"Meadowlark"	4:30
2.	"Titanis" (feat. Kuntari)	3:01
3.	"Mute Swan" (feat. Megan Oztrosits)	4:04
4.	"Black Storm Petrel" (feat. Fange)	3:18
5.	"Titmouse"	4:11
6.	"Titmice"	4:24
7.	"Rook"	4:55
8.	"Thrush"	5:48
Total length:		34:11

== Personnel ==
- Tristan Shone – vocals, instrumentation
- Douglas Sabolick – guitar, backing vocals
- Kuntari – drums (2)
- Megan Oztrosits – vocals (3)
- Fange – programming (4)
- Will Putney – mixing, mastering, production
- Lucile Lejoly – artwork
