= Naurrakar =

Czech black metal band

- Origin: Czech Republic
- Genres: Black metal
- Years active: 2007–present
- Members: Ego BMKrieger; N Ungern; Meggido

Naurrakar is a Czech black metal band, formed in 2007.

== Biography ==
The band was formed in 2007 by Ego BMKrieger. Since its inception, they have released 3 studio albums, 1 live album, 2 EPs and 1 demo. It has frequently toured with other bands, such as Israeli extreme metal band Arallu, or Russian symphonic black metal band Welicoruss. The lineup for the band has frequently changed, the only remaining member from the first recording Imperium Satana is Ego BMKrieger.

Both the albums and the EPs were released by the Ústí nad Labem publisher Werewolf Productions.

The band profiles itself as anti-commercial, and releases often releases its music for free on its official YouTube channel.

== Style ==
All of the band's albums received positive reviews, notably from the Czech music magazine Echoes. In a review of Epilog Lidstva, Metal Viewer described the style of the band as "overwhelming, straightforward Black Metal with hints of punk". The band describes itself as "post-apocalyptic black metal". The lyrics are mostly about "The End", a post-apocalyptic world, misanthropy and Satanism. Majority of the lyrics is in Czech.

== Discography ==
=== Studio albums ===
- 2013: Epilog lidstva
- 2017: Apogeum
- 2021: Uranfaust

=== Live albums ===
- 2012: Kakofonický svět '09

=== EPs ===
- 2009: Imperium Satana (Demo)
- 2012: Zákon chaosu (EP)
- 2015: Triumf jaderného věku (EP)

=== Split albums ===
- 2020: Dissolution - Subatomic Extinction of Everything (with Dantalian)
