= Tomorrow's Eve =

Tomorrow's Eve can refer to:

- An 1886 science fiction novel by Auguste Villiers de l'Isle-Adam, published as L'Ève future in the original French.
- Tomorrow's Eve, a German progressive metal band.
