= Retribution (Ektomorf album) =

Studio album by Ektomorf
- Released: January 31, 2014
- Genres: Groove metal; nu metal
- Label: AFM

Ektomorf chronology
Black Flag (2012)	Retribution (2014)	Aggressor (2015)

Professional ratings
Review scores
Source	Rating
Rock Hard	8.5/10 stars
Metal.de	5/10 stars
Powermetal.de	7/10 stars
Heavymetal.dk	7/10 stars
Metal Hammer Norway	6.5/10 stars
Metal Hammer Germany	5/7 stars
Metal Hammer	2/5 stars
Stereoboard	2.5/5 stars
Scream Magazine	4/6 stars

Retribution is the 12th studio album by the Hungarian heavy metal band Ektomorf, released January 31, 2014.

== Track listing ==
All Music and Lyrics by Zoltán Farkas:

1. "You Can't Control Me" - 2:16
2. "Ten Plagues" - 3:20
3. "Face Your Fear" - 2:23
4. "Escape" - 3:24
5. "Who The Fuck Are You" - 2:32
6. "Numb And Sick" (feat. Cristian Machado) - 2:42
7. "Lost And Destroyed" - 4:09
8. "Souls Of Fire" - 4:26
9. "I Hate You" (Verbal Abuse cover) - 2:08
10. "Watch Me" - 3:23
11. "Mass Ignorance" - 2:42
12. "Save Me" - 2:50
13. "Whisper" - 5:56
14. "Collapsed Bridge" - 3:07

== Personnel ==
Ektomorf

- Zoltán Farkas – vocals, electric guitar, acoustic guitar
- Tamás Schrottner – guitar
- Szabolcs Murvai – bass
- Robert Jaksa – drums

Additional musicians

- Cristian Machado – backing vocals on "Numb and Sick"
