= The Unexpected World =

Studio album by Tomorrow's Eve
- Released: 2000
- Recorded: 1999
- Genre: Progressive metal
- Length: 47:09
- Label: B.Mind Records

Tomorrow's Eve chronology
The Unexpected World (2000)	Mirror Of Creation (2003)

Original Cover
- Original Cover from 1999

The Unexpected World is the debut album by German progressive metal band, Tomorrow's Eve, released in 2000. Upon its release, the album garnered a fair amount of positive press.

== Track listing ==
1. "Intro" (0:20)
2. "Success" (6:50)
3. "Voyager" (8:47)
4. "Outside" (3:08)
5. "Silent Dream" (0:34)
6. "Changes" (12:27)
7. "Descent Into Insanity" (7:40)
8. "Conflict" (6:24)
9. "The Unexpected World" (0:59)

== Musicians ==
- Peter Webel – vocals
- Rainer Grund – guitars
- Oliver Schwickert – keyboards
- Sascha Hilles – bass
- Ralf Gottlieb – drums, percussion
