= Outcast (Ektomorf album) =

Studio album by Ektomorf
- Released: 27 October 2006 (download); January 23, 2007 (CD)
- Genres: Groove metal, nu metal, thrash metal
- Length: 38:46
- Label: Nuclear Blast
- Producer: Tue Madsen

Ektomorf chronology
Instinct (2005)	Outcast (2006)	What Doesn't Kill Me... (2009)

Professional ratings
Review scores
Source	Rating
AllMusic	3.5/5 stars
Blabbermouth.net	1/10 stars
Scream Magazine	4/6 stars
Chronicles of Chaos	2.5/10 stars

Outcast is the seventh album by Hungarian groove metal band Ektomorf, released in 2006 via Nuclear Blast.

== Track listing ==
No.	Title	Length
1.	"Outcast"	4:07
2.	"I Choke"	2:24
3.	"Ambush in the Night"	3:20
4.	"I'm Against"	3:07
5.	"We Rise"	3:03
6.	"Red I"	2:54
7.	"Who Can I Trust (Prayer)"	4:05
8.	"Leave Me Alone"	2:43
9.	"Fuel My Fire" (L7 cover)	4:11
10.	"I Confront My Enemy"	3:32
11.	"Hell Is Here"	3:12
12.	"Chamunda"	2:08

== Personnel ==
- Zoltán Farkas — vocals/guitars/acoustic guitars
- Tamás Schrottner — guitars
- Csaba Farkas — bass
- József Szakács — drums
