= Tales from Serpentia =

Tales From Serpentia

Studio album by Tomorrow's Eve
- Released: October 10, 2008
- Recorded: 2007–2008
- Genre: Progressive Metal
- Length: 68:28 (standard edition)
- Label: Lion Music

Tomorrow's Eve chronology
The Tower (EP) (2007)	Tales From Serpentia (2008)	Íkaros (2010)

Professional ratings
Review scores
Source	Rating
Allmusic	4/5 stars

Tales From Serpentia is the fourth album from the German progressive metal band Tomorrow's Eve. It is the band's third release for the Lion Music label. The album features a number of creative aspects not yet attempted by the band. Tales From Serpentia is also the second full-length album to feature newly appointed Mekong Delta singer Martin LeMar.

== Track listing ==
1. "Nightfall" - 0:48
2. "The Years Ahead" - 5:33
3. "Dream Diary" - 4:41
4. "No Harm" - 6:12
5. "Remember" - 5:50
6. "Succubus" - 5:48
7. "Warning" - 2:27
8. "The Curse" - 5:47
9. "The Tower" - 6:55
10. "Faces" - 5:07
11. "Muse" - 19:20
