= Destroy (album) =

Studio album by Ektomorf
- Released: March 8, 2004
- Recorded: Antfarm Studios, Denmark
- Genres: Groove metal; nu metal
- Length: 47:51
- Label: Nuclear Blast
- Producers: Tue Madsen and Ektomorf

Ektomorf chronology
I Scream Up to the Sky (2002)	Destroy (2004)	Instinct (2005)

Professional ratings
Review scores
Source	Rating
Rock Hard	7.5/10 stars
Metal.de	8/10 stars
Heavymetal.dk	7/10 stars
Chronicles of Chaos	4/10 stars
Visions	3/12 stars
Scream Magazine	3/6 stars
Ox-Fanzine	
Powermetal.de	
Vampster	

Destroy is the fifth album by the Hungarian metal band Ektomorf.

== Track listing ==
All songs composed and arranged by Zoltán Farkas:

1. "I Know Them" (04:39)
2. "Destroy" (03:50)
3. "Gypsy" (04:37)
4. "No Compromise" (02:51)
5. "Everything" (03:08)
6. "From Far Away" (04:50)
7. "Painful But True" (05:05)
8. "Only God" (02:34)
9. "You Are My Shelter" (05:00)
10. "A.E.A." (05:08)
11. "From My Heart" (04:18)
12. "Tear Apart" (01:52)
13. "A Romok Alatt" (live) (03:57) (bonus track)
14. "Nem Engedem" (live) (03:45) (bonus track)
15. "Kalyi Jag (live)" (02:36) (bonus track)
