= Black Flag (Ektomorf album) =

Studio album by Ektomorf
- Released: August 31, 2012
- Genre: Groove metal
- Length: 49:16
- Label: AFM
- Producer: Tue Madsen

Ektomorf chronology
Redemption (2010)	Black Flag (2012)	Retribution (2014)

Black Flag is the eleventh studio album by Hungarian groove metal band Ektomorf. It was released on August 31, 2012 via AFM Records.

== Track listing ==
No.	Title	Length
1.	"War Is My Way"	5:11
2.	"Unscarred"	4:07
3.	"The Cross"	3:57
4.	"Cut It Out"	3:40
5.	"Black Flag"	4:04
6.	"Private Hell"	3:40
7.	"12 Angels"	1:57
8.	"Enemy"	2:09
9.	"Fuck Your God"	2:49
10.	"Never Surrender"	2:56
11.	"Sick Love"	3:27
12.	"Feel Like This"	3:01
13.	"Kill It"	3:51
14.	"The Pretender" (Foo Fighters cover)	4:27
Total length:		52:16

== Personnel ==
- Zoltán Farkas - vocals, guitar
- Róbert Jaksa - drums
- Szabolcs Murvai - bass
