= Aeva Maurelle =

German singer

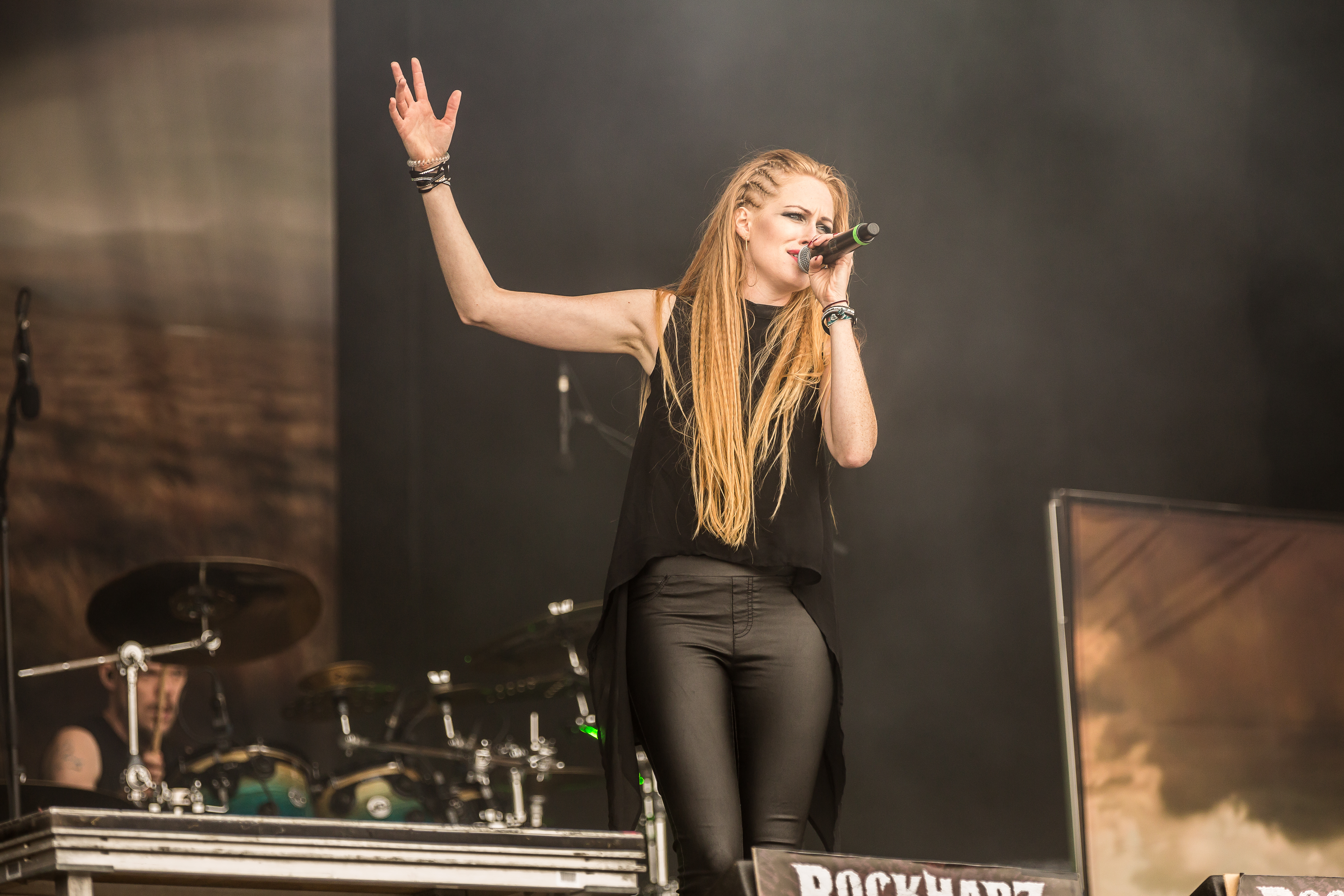
- Maurelle singing with Aeverium (2018)

Background information
- Also known as: Aeva Maurelle
- Born: Sarah Bouwers; March 2, 1986 (age 40); Germany
- Occupations: Singer
- Instruments: Vocals
- Years active: 2008–present
- Label: Out of Line Music

Aeva Maurelle (born March 2, 1986) is a German metal singer, best known for being the former co-lead vocalist of the alternative metal band Aeverium, and the session singer of the symphonic metal band Xandria from 2017 to 2019.

== Musical career ==
In 2013, after she tried her luck with another band and that didn't work out, she was invited to join Aeverium and they started recording their EP The Harvest. Later on, their debut album Break Out was released in 2015, with follow-up Time being released in early 2017. During the European tour with Aeverium and Kamelot in 2016, Aeva was invited to perform on stage.

On 12 September 2017, Xandria announced Aeva would be filling in temporarily for Dianne van Giersbergen in November and December, while Van Giersbergen departed the following day. Xandria continued touring with Aeva until 2019. During this time, a replacement in Aeverium was found in Micky Huijsmans. Later on, during the tour with Xandria she joined Secret Rule on stage, performing alongside guest singer Ailyn. Aeva left Aeverium on 11 September 2018.

In 2020, Aeva joined forces with Maxi Nil for a project called She & Her Darkness. She also provided lead and backing vocals for Vivaldi Metal Project's second studio album.

Maurelle also has a solo career; she published her first single, "Dreamer", on 12 November 2020.

In 2024, Aeva signed with El Puerto Records

== Discography ==
=== With Aeverium ===
Studio albums:

- Break Out (2015)
- Time (2017)

EPs:

- The Harvest (2013)
