= Instinct (Ektomorf album) =

Studio album by Ektomorf
- Released: 2005
- Genres: Groove metal; nu metal
- Label: Nuclear Blast
- Producers: Tue Madsen and Ektomorf

Ektomorf chronology
Destroy (2004)	Instinct (2005)	Outcast (2006)

Professional ratings
Review scores
Source	Rating
Rock Hard	7.5/10 stars
Metal.de	8/10 stars
Blabbermouth	5.5/10 stars
Allmusic	1.5/5 stars
Visions	5/12 stars
Scream Magazine	5/6 stars
Exclaim!	
Powermetal.de	
Vampster	
Jærbladet	5/5 stars

Instinct is the sixth album by Hungarian metal band Ektomorf.

== Track listing ==
1. "Set Me Free" - 3:10
2. "Show Your Fist" - 3:28
3. "Instinct" - 3:58
4. "Burn" - 4:16
5. "The Holy Noise" - 3:42
6. "Fuck You All" - 3:10
7. "United Nations" - 5:04
8. "Land of Pain" - 2:12
9. "I Break You" - 3:50
10. "You Get What You Give" - 2:47
11. "Until the End" - 3:55
12. "I Will" - 3:52

=== Bonus features ===
1. "Destroy" (Enhanced Video Clip)
2. "I Know Them" (Enhanced Video Clip)
