= Melk en Honing =

Studio album by Author & Punisher
- Released: June 30, 2015
- Genre: Industrial metal; doom metal; industrial
- Length: 53:23
- Label: Housecore
- Producer: Phil Anselmo; Tristan Shone; Michael Thompson

Author & Punisher chronology
Women & Children (2013)	Melk en Honing (2015)	Beastland (2018)

Melk en Honing (Dutch for 'Milk and Honey') is the fifth studio album by one-man industrial metal band Author & Punisher. Produced by Phil Anselmo, Author & Punisher's Tristan Shone and Michael Thompson, it was released on June 30, 2015, by Anselmo's Housecore Records.

== Background ==
Tristan Shone considered the record to be "the most 'live' version of Author & Punisher." He has collaborated with Anselmo on Melk en Honing after he pitched to different record labels and got a positive response from Housecore Records. According to him, he and Anselmo had a "very similar idea of what 'heavy' was" and made the vocals more prominent in the mix.

Shone has described the title of the album as "really more of a sort of tip of the hat to the Dutch for reaching out and accepting of something new." He has further stated that "a bit of a medicinal or chemical component to the title, Melk en Honing, because it relates to the sense of hard work and bodily chemicals that are involved."

== Critical reception ==
Professional ratings
Aggregate scores
Source	Rating
Metacritic	81/100
Review scores
Source	Rating
Consequence	B−
Revolver	4/5

Melk en Honing has received generally positive reviews. At Metacritic, which assigns a normalized rating out of 100 to reviews from mainstream critics, the album has an average score of 81 based on 4 reviews, indicating "universal acclaim". J. Bennett of Revolver praised the album, describing the album's tracks as "dizzying, pulsating and pounding expositions of man's ultimate sonic collusion with machine." Consequence critic Sean Barry was more mixed in his response, writing: "It's truly an opportunity missed, though, to simply listen to this record. Genuine appreciation comes only with a good deal of research into the equipment Shone has invented and employed to produce these sounds."

== Track listing ==
1. "The Barge" — 8:09
2. "Cauterize" — 3:28
3. "Shame" — 7:34
4. "Future Man" — 7:20
5. "Disparate" — 8:33
6. "Callous and Hoof" — 6:54
7. "Teething" — 4:20
8. "Void, Null, Alive" — 7:05

== Personnel ==
Album personnel as adapted from Bandcamp:

- Tristan Shone — performer, producer
- Phil Anselmo — producer
- Michael Thompson — producer, engineer
- Stephen Berrigan — engineer
- Russell MacEwan — artwork
