= Beastland =

Studio album by Author & Punisher
- Released: October 5, 2018
- Genre: Industrial metal; industrial; doom metal
- Length: 36:42
- Label: Relapse
- Producer: Tristan Shone; Braden Diotte

Author & Punisher chronology
Melk en Honing (2015)	Beastland (2018)	Krüller (2022)

Beastland is the sixth studio album by one-man industrial metal band Author & Punisher, released on October 5, 2018 via Relapse Records. Being the band's first album on the label, it was produced by Tristan Shone of Author & Punisher and Braden Diotte.

The album spawned the music video for the track "Nihil Strength", which was directed by Augie Arredondo.

== Background and music ==
The production duties on Beastland were handled by Tristan Shone and Braden Diotte. Jason Begin, also known as Vytear, also contributed to the sound design and programming of electronic beats; Begin would go on to produce Author & Punisher's following record, 2022's Krüller. The mixing was performed by Kurt Ballou of Converge and GodCity Studios. The cover artwork by Juha Arvid Helminen was originally created for the Blow Up Festival in Helsinki, Finland, where Author & Punisher performed in 2018.

On the album's themes, Shone further stated: "Along with being a somewhat political album, albeit in an abstract prose, Beastland is one that explores the emotional and physical pain of our downfall, where I’d like to think I take an analytical approach, rather than one of pure cynicism and despair." He has further stated that "essentially that I was trying to take different beasts that I would explore in each song." Shone was also influenced by the World War I aesthetic and N. K. Jemisin's novel The Fifth Season. The latter was particularly inspired the track "Ode to Bedlam." The track "Pharmacide" criticizes the pharmaceutical industry.

== Critical reception ==
Professional ratings
Review scores
Source	Rating
Exclaim!	7/10
Pitchfork	7.1/10
The Skinny	4/5 stars

On Beastland, Brayden Turenne of Exclaim! wrote that: "Though Shone undoubtedly pushes the boundaries in his method of crafting his music, that doesn't always distract from the fact of the product sounding repetitive or even constrained." Turenne further concluded that "the record isn't Author & Punisher's strongest album, but it is a testament to Shone's talent that it is still a really good listen." Pitchfork critic Brian Howe noted that "Shone’s cold fury lashes the listener, but it’s laced with warmer emotional undercurrents of nostalgia for the raw, ragged soul of 1990s alt and indie rock." Paul Sinclair of The Skinny stated: "Beastland creates a want to witness this music live, with the impression that a live environment will bring just a little more power and life to these harsh soundscapes."

Decibel critic Justin Norton considered the record to be "exceptionally dark," further stating that "it is as best appreciated more as ambient sound than a traditional album." Writing for Chicago Reader, Luca Cimarusti considered the record to be "heavier, denser, and scarier than ever before—never once letting up its blown-out wall of sound."

== Track listing ==
All tracks are written by Tristan Shone.

1. "Pharmacide" — 4:29
2. "Nihil Strength" — 3:36
3. "Ode to Bedlam" — 3:28
4. "The Speaker is Systematically Blown" — 4:14
5. "Nazarene" — 4:09
6. "Apparition" — 4:38
7. "Night Terror" — 6:05
8. "Beastland" — 6:03

== Personnel ==
Album personnel as adapted from Bandcamp:

- Tristan Shone — performer, producer, engineer
- John Cota — engineer
- Jason Begin — additional recording engineer
- Braden Diotte — producer
- Kurt Ballou — mixing
- Brad Boatright — mastering
- Juha Arvid Helminen — artwork
