= Manimal (band) =

French death metal band

- Origin: Toulouse, France
- Genres: Death metal Thrash metal
- Years active: 2003–2012
- Label: Toulousain Jerkov
- Members: Julien Cassarino - Vocals; David Castel - Guitar; Ludovic Deny - Guitar; Fabrice Soula - Bass Guitar; Brice Sansonetto - drums

Manimal is a French death metal band from Toulouse, comprising members of Psykup, Leiden and Sailenth. The band members define their music as a cross between Faith No More and Cannibal Corpse, and have called their style "Open Death", an avant-garde, progressive subgenre when compared to the music of more classical death metal acts.

== Biography ==
The band was formed in June 2003, and played together for a short time before recording a demo consisting of four tracks that would appear on their following album, Eros and Thanatos, released in 2004. The band began their first national tour, returning to the studio after a year to record their second album, Succube, released in 2005.

Both albums were recorded at Studio des Milans in Ondres, Landes, the same studio used by Gojira. Joe Duplantier from Gojira guested vocals on the track "Dead Meat" on Eros & Thanatos.

After seven years, the band released the Multiplicity album in 2012, which they announced would be their last. They planned to disband after their last shows of 2012 due to the departure of guitarist and main composer David Castel. A fan page was created advocating his return, called the Manimal Shepherd in reference to the Sea Shepherd Conservation Society association supported, among others, by Gojira.

== Discography ==
- Eros & Thanatos (2004)
- Succube (2005)
- Multiplicity (2012)
