= Krüller (album) =

Studio album by Author & Punisher
- Released: February 11, 2022
- Genres: Industrial metal; experimental metal
- Length: 51:21
- Label: Relapse
- Producers: Vytear; Tristan Shone

Author & Punisher chronology
Beastland (2018)	Krüller (2022)	Nocturnal Birding (2025)

Krüller is the seventh studio album by one-man industrial metal band Author & Punisher, released on February 11, 2022 via Relapse Records. Produced by Tristan Shone of Author & Punisher and electronic musician Vytear, the album features contributions from Perturbator, as well as from Tool members Danny Carey and Justin Chancellor.

== Background and recording ==
Early writing process for Krüller started in 2020, following the band's 2020 tour with Tool, which was cut short due to the advent of COVID-19 pandemic. On that tour, Shone has recorded his live performances, which he analyzed and reflected upon following the end of the tour. He has and opted to focus on "the balance between heaviness and melody" on the next record. Building upon Shone's custom-built instruments, the "dub" and "drone" machines, the album was co-produced by IDM musician Jason Begin, who also aided in mixing duties. Begin also contributed to a substantial portion of the beats and electronic programming on the track "Blacksmith". In addition, the album saw the re-introduction of guitars to Author & Punisher's music, with Phil Sgrosso's contributions. On the track "Centurion", Shone worked with Tool bassist Justin Chancellor, while the track "Misery" featured drumming contributions from Tool drummer Danny Carey, with whom Shone has met prior to the 2020 tour. The latter track featured a programmed beat in addition to Carey's drumming. The cover of "Glory Box" by Portishead has been performed live by Shone since 2007.

== Music and lyrics ==
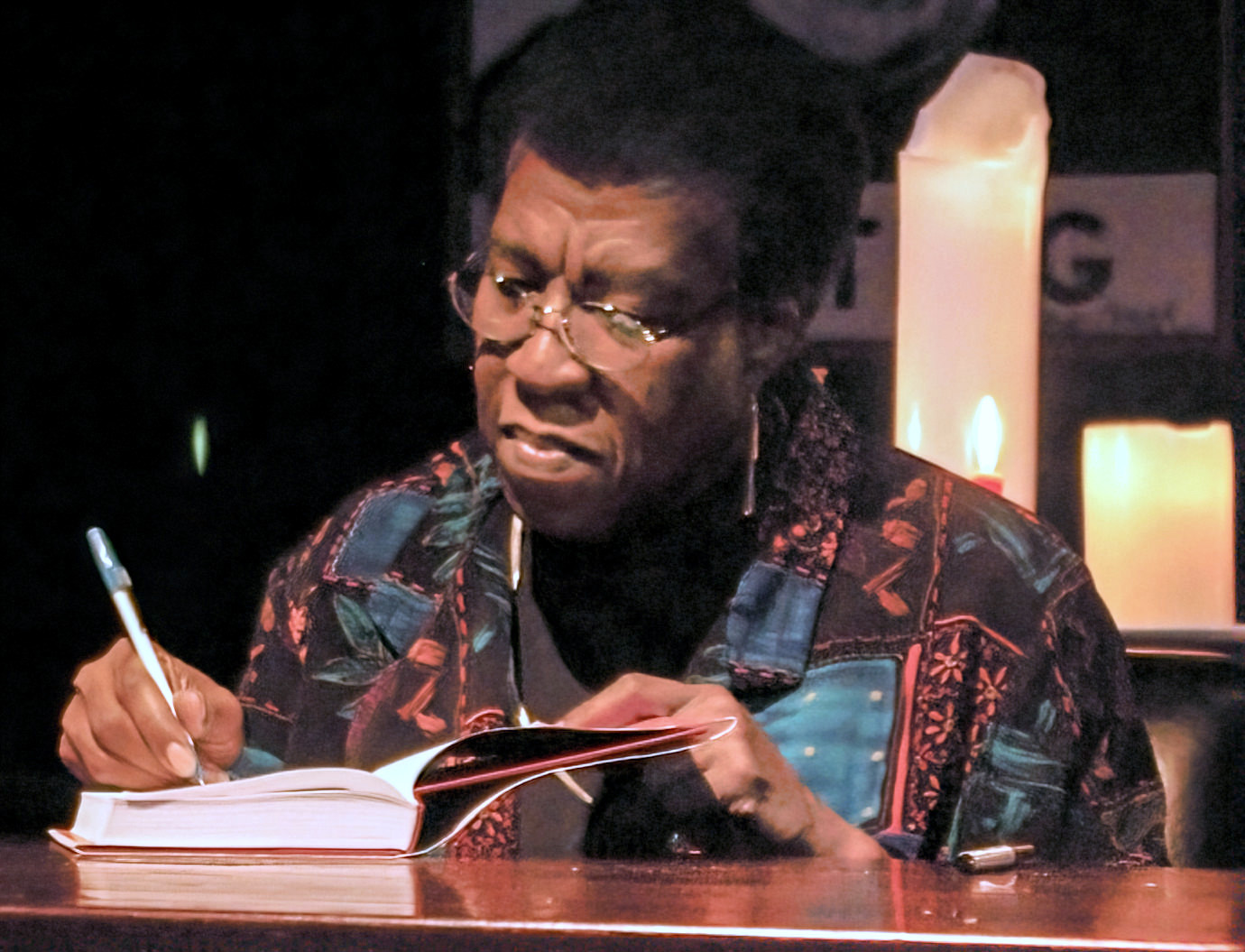
Octavia E. Butler's literary work was an influence on Krüller.

With the re-introduction of guitars, Krüller showcases alternative rock, shoegaze and gothic metal influences. Pitchfork critic Brian Howe has noted that the record "sounds as much like Alice in Chains as it does Godflesh, Throbbing Gristle, or even Nine Inch Nails." AllMusic's Paul Simpson has stated that "tracks like "Incinerator" are reminiscent of the industrial side of '90s alternative metal, but drawn out and extra bleak and apocalyptic." Sam Law of Kerrang! noted that "the pounding, dissonant industrial of Godflesh and Scorn is still prevalent in the mix, but now it’s augmented by the eerie Blade Runner synths of Vangelis and vintage Nine Inch Nails’ ability to make inhuman sonic surfaces sweat sex and sleaze."

The topics covered in Krüller influence climate change, war, survivalism and COVID-19 pandemic, as well as the contemporary socio-political climate of the United States. According to Shone, works of Octavia E. Butler, Ursula Le Guin, and Margaret Atwood has influenced the lyrical themes of the album. The track "Drone Carrying Dread" was particularly inspired by Butler's book Parable of the Sower. Lyrics of "Centurion" covers the 2021 United States Capitol attack, while the track "Misery" was written in response to the controversy regarding the building of the Mexico–United States border wall over the ancient burial site of the Kumeyaay nation. Shone has also described the track "Blacksmith" as "an ode to Black women–led movements who have been fearlessly leading the way against oppression in this country for a long time."

== Critical reception ==
Professional ratings
Aggregate scores
Source	Rating
Metacritic	79/100
Review scores
Source	Rating
AllMusic	3.5/5 stars
Blabbermouth.net	8/10
Kerrang!	4/5
Metal Hammer	7/10
Metal Injection	9/10
The Line of Best Fit	8/10
Pitchfork	7.4/10
Punknews.org	4/5 stars

Krüller has received generally positive reviews. At Metacritic, which assigns a normalized rating out of 100 to reviews from mainstream critics, the album has an average score of 79 based on 6 reviews, indicating "generally favorable reviews". AllMusic critic Paul Simpson has noted the record to be "one of the most accessible-sounding Author & Punisher releases," while labeling it as "still vast and uncompromising." Dom Lawson of Blabbermouth.net described Krüller as "a triumph for the visceral potential of sound, and the emotional catharsis that comes when everything is cranked up to the absolute max," while Kerrang!'s Sam Law stated: "Ultimately, though, Krüller is best experienced not in its individual segments but as an overwhelming whole. The meld of muscle and mechanisation still demands that listeners hand themselves over entirely."

Alex Deller of Metal Hammer noted that the expansion of sounds on Krüller "allow Shone to paint his bleak, mono-chromatic visions with ever more subtle shades of grey." Metal Injection's Riley Rowe noted that the record "shows a human side of Shone, more right side of the brain, and an openness to more perspective." Writing for The Line of Best Fit, Kate Crudgington described the record as "a sonic purge that rages and recoils in equal measure, enhanced by collaboration, but with Shone remaining the master of ceremonies of his distinctive noise." Brian Howe of Pitchfork wrote: "If Krüller is warmed by a nostalgic human past, it also bears the chill of a posthuman future where the machines grind on without us, an intimation that seeps from his music like a corrosive fluid and lends these songs a bitter, heroic weight." Punknews.org critic John Gentile considered the record as "cyborg music driven by metal fingers, but the human heart is still intact."

== Track listing ==
All tracks written by Tristan Shone except where noted.

No.	Title	Length
1.	"Drone Carrying Dread"	8:15
2.	"Incinerator"	6:56
3.	"Centurion" (featuring Justin Chancellor)	5:42
4.	"Maiden Star"	6:53
5.	"Misery" (featuring Danny Carey)	4:49
6.	"Glorybox" (Portishead, Isaac Hayes)	6:28
7.	"Blacksmith" (featuring Vytear)	4:56
8.	"Krüller"	7:22
Total length:		51:21

== Personnel ==
- Tristan Shone — performance, production, mixing
- Phil Sgrosso — guitar
- Vytear — production
- Jason Begin — mixing
- Brad Boatright — mastering
- Danny Carey — guest performance (5)
- Justin Chancellor — guest performance (3)
- Zlatko Mitev — artwork
