= Acârash =

Norwegian band

- Origin: Oslo, Norway
- Genres: Black metal, doom metal, hard rock
- Years active: 2016–present
- Label: Dark Essence Records
- Members: Anlov; Lukas Paulsen; Anders Gjelsvik; Sølve Sæther

Acârash is an occult blackened heavy metal band from Oslo, Norway. The band combines elements of doom metal, black metal and 1970s hard rock. They are signed to Dark Essence Records. The members have past connections with Lonely Kamel and The Void

== History ==
The band was formed in the fall of 2016 by Anlov P. Mathiesen , Lukas Paulsen, and Sølve Sæther. In the summer of 2017 they recorded their debut album In Chaos Becrowned and signed a deal with Dark Essence Records, the home of bands like Taake, Hades Almighty and Helheim.

The founding members of Acârash had a shared history from The Void, a Norwegian avant-garde hard rock band. The Void was the core of a fringe movement connected with the black metal and rock scene in and around Oslo in the early 1990s. The band briefly had members from Dimmu Borgir, Borknagard and Arcturus.

After the original members Sæther, Paulsen and Mathiesen eventually laid The Void to rest, they proceeded on their own with bands like Lonely Kamel, Zection8, Faustus, Deep Rest and TurnCoat.

The first Acârash single Cadaver Dei premiered on Metal Hammer on 26 April 2018.

== Discography ==
=== Studio albums ===
Year	Title	Record label	Line-up
2018	In Chaos Becrowned	Dark Essence Records	Valac, Lukas Paulsen, Sølve Sæther
2020	Descend to Purity	Dark Essence Records	Valac, Lukas Paulsen, Sølve Sæther, Anders Gjelsvik

=== Singles ===
Year	Title	Record label	Line-up
2018	Cadaver Dei	Dark Essence Records	Valac, Lukas Paulsen, Sølve Sæther
2018	In Chaos Becrowned	Dark Essence Records	Valac, Lukas Paulsen, Sølve Sæther

=== Music videos ===
Year	Title	Record label	Line-up
2018	In Chaos Becrowned	Dark Essence Records	Valac, Lukas Paulsen, Sølve Sæther

== Members ==
=== Current members ===
- Anlov – vocals, bass (2016–present)
- Lukas Paulsen – guitars (2016–present)
- Anders Gjelsvik – guitars (2018–present)
- Sølve Sæther – drums (2018–present)

=== Previous members ===
- Jarle Bjerkely – guitars (2016)

=== Former live members ===
- André Kvebek – guitars (2018)
- Kenneth Mellum – drums (2018–2019)
