= Necronomicon (band) =

German thrash metal band

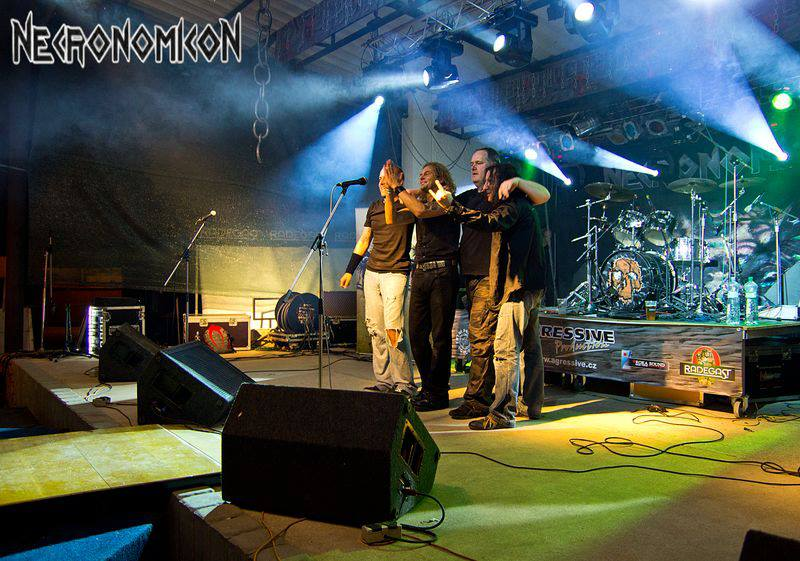

Background information
- Genres: Punk rock (early), thrash metal
- Years active: 1983–present
- Members: Volker "Freddy" Fredrich; Rik "Roundcat" Charron; Marco Lohrenz; Glenn Shannon
- Past members: Andreas Gern; Jürgen "Jogi" Weltin; Andreas Nagel; Bernhard Matt; Benjamin Rogg; Klaus Enderlin; Michael Lohrenz
- Website: http://www.necronomicon.eu//

Necronomicon is a German thrash metal band founded in 1983.

== History ==
Band leader Volker "Freddy" Fredrich, Axel Strickstrock, and Lars "Lala" Honeck founded Necronomicon in 1983. The band played punk rock, so, in 1981, Fredrich founded Total Rejection. Early Necronomicon was influenced by bands including Discharge, The Exploited and GBH. Their style became heavier due to the influence of Motörhead, Metallica and Slayer.

In 1985, the quartet signed with GAMA Records. One year later, guitarist Jürgen "Jogi" Weltin was recruited. The band released their debut album, Necronomicon, and gained notoriety in the underground scene.

In 1987, the second album, Apocalyptic Nightmare, was released. They toured Austria, Hungary, Czechoslovakia, and Russia.

In the late 1980s, German thrash metal peaked with bands such as Kreator, Sodom and Destruction. Necronomicon was less successful due to some setbacks. After 1988, when the third album was released at Escalation GAMA Records, Necronomicon left GAMA due to financial issies. As the label threatened legal action, the band surrendered the rights to the songs along and the band name for ten years, and agreed not to sign with another label.

In 1993, the ten-year embargo was successfully challenged. Necronomicon signed with D&S Records. Although the album Screams was mixed in 1994 under new management, D&S Records went bankrupt that year and ceased contact with the band. In addition, a fire destroyed the rehearsal room and a portion of the equipment, almost causing Necronomicon to break up.

In early 2000, there was an international thrash revival. Bands such as Destruction and Exodus toured and produced new albums. Necronomicon signed with Remedy Records of Hamburg in March 2004, and released the CD Construction of Evil. Before the release, guitarist Jogi left because of tinnitus.

In 2007, Necronomicon signed with Spanish label Xtreem Music and released Revenge of the Beast. The CD was recorded as a special edition with a rougher mix of classic 1980s thrash in Neuenburg am Rhein. The European tour in 2009 went through Greece, Spain and Russia. Drummer and founding member Axel Strickstrock resigned and was replaced with Klaus Enderlin.

By the end of June 2013, Necronomicon recruited Benjamin "Ben Jay" Rogg and Marco Lohrenz on guitar and bass to complete their line-up. This formation played in the Czech Republic at the Aggressive Music Fest 2013.

On 27 November 2015, the band released their album Pathfinder... Between Heaven and Hell on German label Trollzorn Records. Then came the album Invictus, which won the title of "Album Of The Month" on the Metallian.com webzine.

== Musical style ==
Necronomicon started as a punk rock band, reflected in the demo Total Rejection. Due to the influence of Motörhead, Metallica and Slayer, a synthesis of the old style and the new metal influences was created. The band's style in the mid-1980s was described by the online magazine Metalize.Me as a mixture of Hellhammer and Sodom. In 1987 "Freddy" reported disappointment with the album Apocalyptic Nightmare: "The songs are good, but the musicians weren't mature enough to implement it adequately". Construction of Evil (2004) was described by Martin of heavy Metal.de as "...fairly classical old school Heavy Metal and up-tempo power metal without prolonged double base-storm...". The seventh album, Invictus (2012), combines the 1980s style with contemporary elements. Metalize.Me said it sounds "...charmingly like rumble metal, but it does not rumble anymore...it's now played accurately...“. Martin of heavy Metal.de said that "Freddy's" rough vocals are a specific feature of the band which lets Necronomicon stand out of the mass of power and heavy metal bands in Germany."

== Discography ==
=== Studio albums ===
- 1985: Necronomicon
- 1987: Apocalyptic Nightmare (Gama-Records)
- 1988: Escalation (Gama-Records)
- 1994: Screams (D & S Records)
- 2004: Construction of Evil (Remedy-Records)
- 2008: Revenge of the Beast (Xtreem Music)
- 2012: Invictus (Massacre Records)
- 2015: Pathfinder... Between Heaven and Hell
- 2018: Unleashed Bastards (El Puerto Records)
- 2021: The Final Chapter
- 2023: Constant to Death

=== Demos ===
- 1985: Total Rejection
- 1985: Blind Destruction
- 1992: Lucky Strikes
- 2000: Possessed Again!

=== Splits ===
- 1986: Break Out - German Metal Tracks No.2
