= Welicoruss =

Russian symphonic black metal band

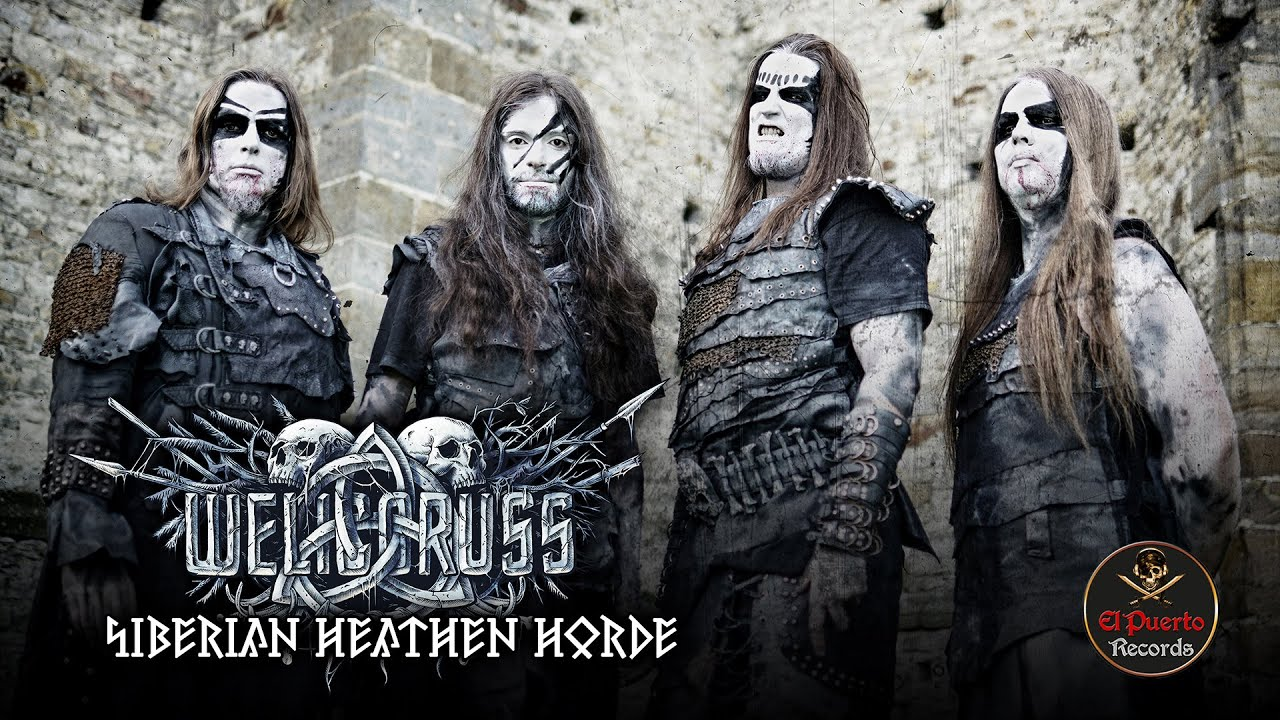
- Line-up at the time of the "Siberian Heathen Horde'" album release

Background information
- Origin: Novosibirsk, Russia
- Genres: Symphonic black metal
- Years active: 2005–present
- Label: El-Puerto Records
- Members: See Current members
- Past members: See Former members
- Website: www.welicoruss.org

Welicoruss is a symphonic black metal band, formed in 2005 by leader and main composer Alexey Boganov. The band is initially from Novosibirsk, Russia, and was reformed in Prague, Czech Republic, in 2013. Their lyrical themes touch on Theosophy, Philosophy, and other Occult and Esoteric subjects. The band is currently signed to El-Puerto Records, Germany.

== Biography ==
=== Early years (2002-2012) ===
Welicoruss were officially formed as a band in 2005 in Novosibirsk, Russia, after vocalist Alexey Bogdanov started to experimented with different musical styles in 2002. This resulted in the first version of the demo, Winter Moon Symphony.

In 2010, the band stopped all live activity due to creative disagreements inside the band.

=== Move to Europe (2013-2016) ===
In the spring of 2013, Boganov relocated to Prague, Czechia. As all other band members remained in Novosibirsk, Boganov effectively had to start the band from scratch. The first new line-up consisted of Gojko Maric as guitarist, bass player Dmitry Zhikharevich, and drummer David Urban. With that lineup, Welicoruss began performing in venues in Czechia, Germany, and Austria in 2014.

At the beginning of 2015, Welicoruss independently released their third album Az Esm, which includes 12 songs, four of them having been reworked from the previous mini-album Kharnha. While lyrics were still performed in Russian on this release, English translations were also available in the booklet. The album was received generally favourable by underground fanzines. At the end of 2015, an official video for the title song "Az Esm," which was shot in a theater in Novosibirsk in 2013, prior to the relocation to Prague.

In 2016, Ilya Tabachnik replaced David Urban on drums. 2016 also saw an increase in live concerts, as the band played shows in the Czech Republic, Germany, Austria, Slovakia, Netherlands, Belgium, Switzerland, and France, including Ragnarök Festival (Germany), Rock of Sadska Fest (Czech Republic), Czech Death Festival (Czech Republic), Gothoom festival (Slovakia), Heathen Rock Festival (Germany), and Exit Festival (Serbia).

=== Line-up changes (2017-2018) ===
In 2017, the band played at Hellfest (France). During this time, bassist Dmitry Zhikharevich left the band due to changing priorities. He was first replaced by Ondrey Žadný and later Tomáš Magnusek. In the same year, Welicoruss went on tour with German melodic black metal band Wolves Den in Europe, covering 20 cities in Germany, France, Belgium, the Netherlands, Switzerland, and Austria. A short tour with Austrian post-black metal band Harakiri for the Sky in the Czech Republic, Slovakia, and Hungary followed later in the year.

In 2018, more tours and festival appearances were held with Welicoruss appearing at small to medium size festivals such as Horner Fest (Germany), Hammerfest (Italy), and Schlichtenfest, Metal United Festival and Wolfszeit Festival in Germany. Between concerts, the members worked on new material with a harsher sound and predominantly English lyrics. At this time, the band also performed in various venues in Serbia, Romania, and Hungary. A short tour with viking metal band Valkenrag, dubbed "Northern Forces Assault tour," was conducted in Poland and Slovakia, with an additional two concerts in Cyprus.

=== Siberian Heathen Horde (2019-present) ===
By the end of 2018, the band collectively worked on material for a new album, with most of the lyrics being written by Alexey.

In January 2019, Welicoruss recorded all instruments for their new album in Faust Studio, Prague. Drummer Ilya Tabachnik performed clean backing vocals. Robert Carson from the Swiss band Xaon also provided backing vocals for the album.

In 2019, Gojko Maric left the band for personal reasons and was replaced by Tomáš Šršeň as a session guitarist.

As of November 30, 2019, the band has signed a contract with German label El-Puerto Records for the release of the album Siberian Heathen Horde. The album was released on March 27, 2020.

On March 14, 2023, guitarist Filip Rabenseifner joined the band as a permanent member, replacing the session guitarist Tomáš Sršeň.

During 2023, Welicoruss completed the work on a new album, which was recorded in the second half of the year in The Barn studio. The new album is set to be released some time in 2024.

== Discography ==
=== Demos ===
- 2002 — WinterMoon Symphony
- 2004 — WinterMoon Symphony [2nd Version]

=== Studio albums ===
- 2008 — WinterMoon Symphony
- 2009 — Apeiron
- 2015 — Az Esm
- 2020 — Siberian Heathen Horde, LP, El Puerto Records

=== Compilations ===
- 2002 — Siberian xXx-treme 2 (WinterMoon Symphony, Pt. 2)
- 2006 — Agarta. Young rock of Siberia — (Mermaid)
- 2007 — Siberian Death Metal — (Apeiron)
- 2011 — Kharnha EP, self-produced, free download
- 2012 — Apeiron/Kharnha LP, previously released material, Domestic Genocide Records
- 2012 — Untitled Album LP, Domestic Genocide Records
- 2016 — Best of Welicoruss [Symphonic Black Metal From The Coldest Depth of Siberia]

=== Music videos ===
- 2007 — "Slavonic Power" (WCG)
- 2008 — "Blizzard" (WCG)
- 2009 — "Slava Rusi" (WCG)
- 2011 — "Kharnha" (Imperium Studio)
- 2012 — "Sons of the North" (EYE Cinema)
- 2015 — "Az Esm" (EYE Cinema)
- 2020 — "Spellcaster" (Mateo Ťažký)
- 2020 — "Siberian Heathen Horde" (Daniel Nemirovskij, Titan Cinema Production)

== Band members ==
=== Current members ===
- Alexey Boganov – vocals, guitars (2005–present)
- Filip Rabenseifner – guitars (2023–present)
- Ilya Tabachnik – drums (2015–present)
- Tomas Magnusek – bass (2018–present)

=== Former members ===
- Pavel Filyukhin – keyboards (2005–2009)
- Ilya Chursin – drums (2006–2013)
- Anton Lorenz – guitars (2007–2008)
- Alexander Golovin – bass (2007–2010)
- Maxim Severniy – guitars (2008–2013)
- Dmitry Polyansky – keyboards (2009–2010)
- Boris Voskolovich – keyboards (2010–2012)
- Alexey Boldin – bass (2010–2013)
- David Urban – drums (2014–2015)
- Dmitriy Zhikharevich – bass (2014–2017)
- Gojko Maric – guitars, piano (2014–2019)
