= Manigance =

French heavy metal band

MANIGANCE
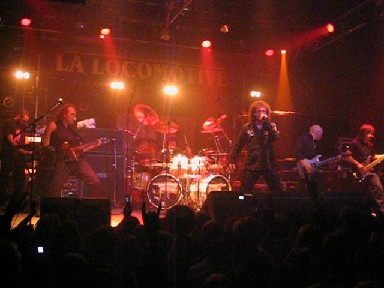

Background information
- Origin: France
- Genres: Power metal - Heavy metal
- Years active: Since 1995
- Labels: XIII Bis Records, Verycords, Brennus Music, NTS, Replica Records, Mighty Music, Spiritual Beast
- Members: Carine PINTO; François MERLE; Stéphane LACOUDE; Patrick SORIA; Lionel VIZERIE
- Past members: Bruno RAMOS; Jean LAHARGUE; Didier DELSAUX; Guillaume RODRIGUEZ; Florent TAILLANDIER; Marc DUFFAU; Daniel POUYLAU; Vincent MOUYEN (†)
- Website: www.manigance.org

The heavy metal band Manigance was formed in France in 1995, with François Merle, Daniel Pouylau, and Didier Delsaux. Their first production was a six-track mini-album called Signe de vie, released by Brennus Music in 1997. This was followed by a studio album titled Ange ou démon, released by NTS in 2002. Manigance was awarded the honorary title of "Best French group 2003" by Hard Rock Magazine. The band continued to release new albums in 2004, 2006, 2011, 2014 and 2018. In March 2018 the band went on an extended European tour with the band Myrath. The current (2020) members of the band are Carine Pinto, François Merle, Lionel Vizerie, Stéphane Lacoude, and Patrick Soria.

== Biography ==
=== The beginnings (1995–2002) ===
The band was formed in 1995 by guitarist François Merle (ex-Killers) and drummer Daniel Pouylau, joined by Didier Delsaux on vocals. Manigance is launched as a cover band that includes groups like Van Halen, Pretty Maids, Toto and Judas Priest. The musicians compose a few songs to make it their first demo (recorded with the means at hand in the basement of a friend's pavilion). They then contacted Alain Ricard, director of Brennus Music, and offered to release a six-track mini-album. In 1997, Signe de vie was released in a limited edition of 500 copies.

=== Ange ou démon (2003–2004) ===
Encouraged by the good echoes, the group embarked on the writing of a first studio album. Not knowing a producer, they set about building their own studio. François Merle decides to learn the main rudiments of production by immersing himself in specialized magazines. The new compositions of the group seduce Olivier Garnier who directs NTS. The label signs the band (first French group in its catalog). Their first studio album, Ange ou démon, was released on 16 April 2002. The specialist press was full of praise, and the album obtained very good marks, notably from the German magazine Rock Hard. There followed dates on the roads of France in April and May 2002 with Royal Hunt, U.D.O. and Freedom Call. Success in France was hoped for, but it is in Japan that sales are even better (5,000 copies). Despite this, the NTS label will not want to invest in a too expensive tour.

In 2003, NTS chose to remaster the mini-album Signe de vie by completing it with two covers of the Canadian group Triumph All the King's Horses and Carry On a Flame, as well as the only English-speaking track composed for the occasion Believer, and of a video recorded live on 28 April 2002 on which Manigance takes over Messager of Sortilège in the company of Christian "Zouille" Augustin, former singer of the band. The album is dedicated to Vincent Mouyen, ex-guitarist of the group who died in 2001. Manigance won the honorary title of "Best French group 2003" at the Hard Rock Magazine trophies. During the trophy ceremony at La Locomotive (Paris), the group has the great pleasure to take on Future World on stage with the musicians of Pretty Maids. The video will appear as a bonus to the studio album then being written.

=== D'un autre sang (2004-2005) ===
After a fairly progressive metal Ange ou démon influenced by bands like Dream Theater or Vanden Plas, the style of his successor D'un autre sang is more heavier, and the sound less "licked". The band no longer has all its time to compose and record because the label gives a timing to respect. Everyone puts their own to it and the result is there, even if we can regret a more aggressive song even though still melodic. Bruno Ramos takes care of most of the guitar solos because François Merle is very busy with the production. Note a solo signed Cédric Dupont (Freedom Call) on Maudit. The cover as for it, is entrusted to Jean-Pascal Fournier, having already worked for Edguy or Nightmare for example. When it was released in early 2004, D'un autre sang was very well received. The group therefore goes on tour on the roads of France with Adagio in February, but also with Stratovarius in May, and European dates (Belgium and Netherlands).

=== L'ombre et la lumière (2005–2009) ===
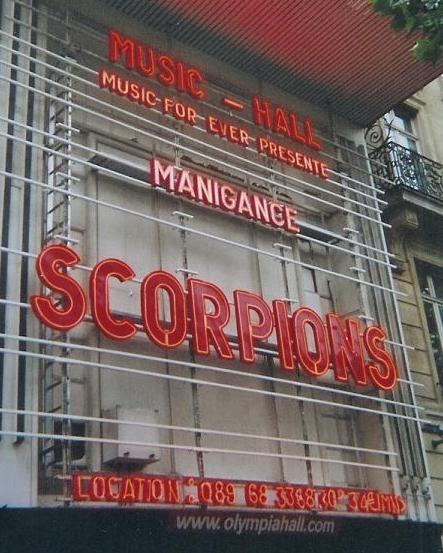

Even if Manigance only has two studio albums to its credit, the group gave birth to a live performance in 2005. It was recorded at the Élysée Montmartre Hall (Paris) on 17 February 2004 with the exception of the title Dernier hommage captured the next day at La Laiterie Hall in Strasbourg. No title from Signe de vie is included on Mémoires ... live. The NTS label having filed for bankruptcy, Replica Records (still with Olivier Garnier) distributes the album. The group is working on its next opus but gets some stages as opener of Scorpions at the Olympia (Paris) on 4 July 2005, and its participation in the Raismesfest festival on 10 September the same year.

Manigance's fourth studio album was released in France on 15 May 2006. L'ombre et la lumière gives pride of place to the instrumental parts. The eponymous title is 7 min 36 s. The song structures are more complex with breaks, rhythm changes and more solos. An instrumental made its appearance for the first time in the discography of Manigance.

While he has written all the texts of the group since its formation in 1995, Didier Delsaux offers Laurent Piquepaille (fan of the first hour or so) the opportunity to write together La Force des souvenirs, the ballad of the album. The cover is the work of Mattias Noren, already known for his work with Evergrey and Iced Earth among others. Once again, the press welcomes the new opus of the group. Specialized sites also praise L'ombre et la lumière. After opening for Whitesnake in Toulouse for the music festival in June 2006, the group went on tour in November with DragonForce and Firewind.

In June 2007, Manigance played headlining on Reunion Island for the music festival, but also at Hellfest in Clisson on the Gibson Stage. The years 2008 and 2009 are devoted to the composition of a new album and to the search for a new label. XIII Bis Records signs the band, and in 2009 released a box set including the four studio albums and the live album.

=== Récidive et Volte face (2011-2018) ===
Manigance's fifth studio album, Récidive, was released on 31 January 2011 in France (16 January in Japan).

In September 2012, Daniel Pouylau announced that he was leaving the group. He is replaced by Guillaume Rodriguez.

Marc Duffau in turn left the group in June 2013, and gave his last concert in Saint-Rémy-de-Provence on 24 August. He was replaced by Stéphane Lacoude (Blind Panther, Manigance (1995/1996), Hardsenic ...).

The band released a new album at the end of 2014, Volte-face, on Verycords Records. The album was announced on 24 August in Japan on the Marquee Avalon label.

In May 2016, a new drummer joined the group, Patrick Soria (ex-Killers).

=== Machine Nation (since 2018) ===
Machine Nation's new album will be released on 2 February 2018 in France (Verycords) and the rest of the world (Mighty music), except in Japan (Spiritual beast) on 14 February 2018.

The titles are melodic and powerful, in the Manigance style, always sung in French. The particularity of this album is a duet between singer Didier Delsaux and Carine Pinto on the first track "Face Contre Terre".

Didier Delsaux left the group on February 3 and Carine Pinto became the official singer of Manigance. The group goes on a European tour in support of Myrath (18 shows all around Europe):

27/01/18 Pau (FR) - Ampli

08/03/18 Paris (FR) - Le Trabendo

09/03/18 Rotterdam (NL) - Baroeg

10/03/18 Arnhem (NL) - Willemen

12/03/18 Berlin (DE) - Quasimodo

13/03/18 Hamburg (DE) - Headcrash

14/03/18 Köln (DE) - Underground

15/03/18 Frankfurt (DE) - Nachtleben

16/03/18 Stuttgard (DE) - Clubcann

17/03/18 Munich (DE) - Backstage

19/03/18 Ostrava (CZ) - Garage Club

20/03/18 Bratislava (SK) - Randal Club

22/03/18 Milan (IT) - Legend Club

23/03/18 Geneva (CH) - Undertown

24/03/18 Montauban (FR) - Rio Grande

25/03/18 Narbonne (FR) - LE DB

27/03/18 Madrid (SP) - Caracol

28/03/18 Barcelona (SP) - Sala Boveda

30/03/18 Nantes (FR) - Le Ferrailleur

On 4 February 2020, while the group is working on their next album, the first opus with Carine Pinto on vocals; Bruno Ramos, busy on other projects, announces his departure from Manigance.

This album is played on stage :

- Manigance + Side Winder + Lust (Bordeaux - France) - 10/01/2019
- Manigance + Kingcrown + Kryzees (Chez Paulette - Nancy - France) - 22/03/2019
- Fortunato + Manigance + Kingcrown + Max Pie - Fortunato And Friends (Jack Jack - Lyon - France) - 23/03/2019
- Threshold + Eldritch + Manigance + Mobius - Ready For Prog Fest (Toulouse - France) - 11/10/2019
- TNT + Manigance - Tous unis autour de Diego (Hasparren - France) - 12/10/2019
- Manigance + Wedingoth + Kingcrown - Festival Au Son Du Metal (Seyssuel - France) - 19/10/2019
- Sortilège + Satan + Freedom Call + Titan + Manigance + Existence + Tentation - Festival de Vouziers (France) - 26/10/2019

It is Lionel Vizerie, who has already played with Patrick Soria, and acts as Bruno on 2 dates in 2019, who is announced as an artilleryman on 23 February 2020.

== Members ==
=== Current members ===
- Carine Pinto - vocals (since 2018)
- François Merle - guitar (since 1995)
- Lionel Vizerie - guitar (since 23/02/2020)
- Stéphane Lacoude - bass (1995–1996, since 2013)
- Patrick Soria - drums (since 2016)

=== Ex-members ===
- Bruno Ramos - guitar (depuis 1998–2020)
- Didier Delsaux - vocals (1995–2018)
- Jean Lahargue - keyboards
- Guillaume Rodriguez - drums (2012–2016)
- Florent Taillandier - keyboards
- Marc Duffau - bass (?-2013)
- Daniel Pouylau - drums (1995–2012)
- Vincent Mouyen - guitar (dead in 2001)

== Discography ==
=== Studio albums ===
==== 1997 : Signe de vie ====
- Sans fard
- Signe de vie
- Ligne blanche
- Rebelle
- Aube nouvelle
- Rouge comme la peau

==== 2002 : Ange ou démon ====
- En mon nom
- Comme une ombre
- L'ultime seconde
- Utopia
- Ange ou démon
- Fleurs du mal
- Dernier hommage
- Dès mon retour
- Intégrité
- Nomade
- Désobéis
- Messager

==== 2003 : Signe de vie (remaster) ====
- Sans fard
- Signe de vie
- Ligne blanche
- Rebelle
- Aube nouvelle
- Rouge comme la peau
- L'ultime seconde (acoustic version)
- All king's horses
- Carry on the flame
- Believer

==== 2004 : D'un autre sang ====
- Mirage
- Empire virtuel
- Mourir en héros
- Héritier
- Hors la loi
- Maudit
- Mémoire
- Damoclès
- La mort dans l'âme
- D'un autre sang
- Enfin délivré

==== 2006 : L'ombre et la lumière ====
- Abysse
- Envahisseur
- L'ombre et la lumière
- Prison dorée
- Prédateur
- Sang millénaire
- Privilège
- La force des souvenirs
- Sentinelle
- Miroir de la vie
- Esclave
- Labyrinthe

==== 2011 : Récidive ====
- Aura (intro)
- Larme de l'univers
- Dernier allié
- Mercenaire
- L'ombre d'hier
- Chant de bataille
- Secret de l'âme
- Récidiviste
- Illusion
- Sentiers de la peur
- Vertiges
- En seigneur
- Déserteur
- Délivrance
- Sans détour

==== 2014 : Volte face ====
- Pur sang
- Leader
- Le coté sombre
- Apparence
- Volte face
- Ultimatum
- Sans relâche
- Planeta Zemlya
- Say it ain't so (Murray Head cover)
- Le mirage
- Parjure

==== 2018 : Machine nation ====
- Adage (intro)
- Face contre terre
- Ennemi
- Machination
- Indifférent
- Loin d'ici
- La donne doit changer
- Avec des si
- Méandres
- L'un de l'autre
- Exutoire
- Nouvelle ère

=== Live album ===
==== 2005 : MEMOIRES... live ====
- Mirage (intro)
- Empire virtuel
- Mourir en héros
- Comme une ombre
- Mémoire
- Maudit
- D'un autre sang
- La mort dans l'âme
- L'ultime seconde
- Héritier
- Drums solo
- Dès mon retour
- En mon nom

=== Compilation ===
- 2009 : Original albums classics (4 studio album and live album)
