= Fury (Ektomorf album) =

Studio album by Ektomorf
- Released: February 16, 2018
- Recorded: August 2017
- Genre: Groove metal
- Length: 33:20
- Label: AFM
- Producers: Tue Madsen, Zoltán Farkas

Ektomorf chronology
Aggressor (2015)	Fury (2018)	Reborn (2021)

Professional ratings
Review scores
Source	Rating
Rock Hard	6/10 stars
Powermetal.de	7.5/10 stars
Heavymetal.dk	6/10 stars
Metal Hammer Germany	5/7 stars 2/7 stars
Metal Hammer	3.5/5 stars

Fury is the 14th album by the Hungarian metal band Ektomorf.

== Track listing ==
All music and lyrics by Zoltán Farkas:

1. "The Prophet Of Doom" (03:02)
2. "AK 47" (03:02)
3. "Fury" (03:38)
4. "Bullet In Your Head" (03:14)
5. "Faith And Strength" (03:08)
6. "Infernal Warfare" (02:59)
7. "Tears Of Christ" (04:02)
8. "Blood For Blood" (03:19)
9. "If You're Willing To Die" (03:51)
10. "Skin Them Alive" (03:10)

== Personnel ==
Ektomorf

- Zoltán Farkas – vocals, guitar
- Szebasztián Simon – guitar
- Attila Asztalos – bass
- Dániel Szabó – drums
