= Autokrator (metal band) =

French blackened death metal band

Background information
- Origin: Paris, France
- Genres: Death metal, black metal
- Years active: 2014-2021
- Members: David Bailey; L.F
- Website: Official website

Autokrator is a French blackened death metal band, formed in 2014 dealing with history, psychology and Christianity.

== Discography ==
In 2015, Autokrator released its first, self-titled album, dealing with the Roman Empire.

In 2016, Autokrator released its second album, The Obedience to Authority, based on Stanley Milgram's experience and book Obedience to Authority: An Experimental View and L. Ron Hubbard's book Brain-Washing.

In 2018, Autokrator released its third album, Hammer of the Heretics, about the Christian inquisition.

In 2021, Autokrator released its last album, Persecution, denouncing the persecution of Christians by the Romans.

== Members ==
- L.F - production, bass, guitar, samples (2014-)
- David Bailey - vocals (2014-)
- Kevin Paradis - drums (2016-)

== Past members ==
- Oleg I - drums (2014-2015)
- Markian Volkov - samples (2014-2015)
- Brandon L. Polaris - vocals (2014-2015)
- Septimiu Hărşan - drums (2015-2016)

== Discography ==
- Autokrator (2015)
- The Obedience to Authority (2016)
- Hammer of the Heretics (2018)
- Persecution (2021)
