= Author & Punisher =

Solo musical project by Tristan Shone

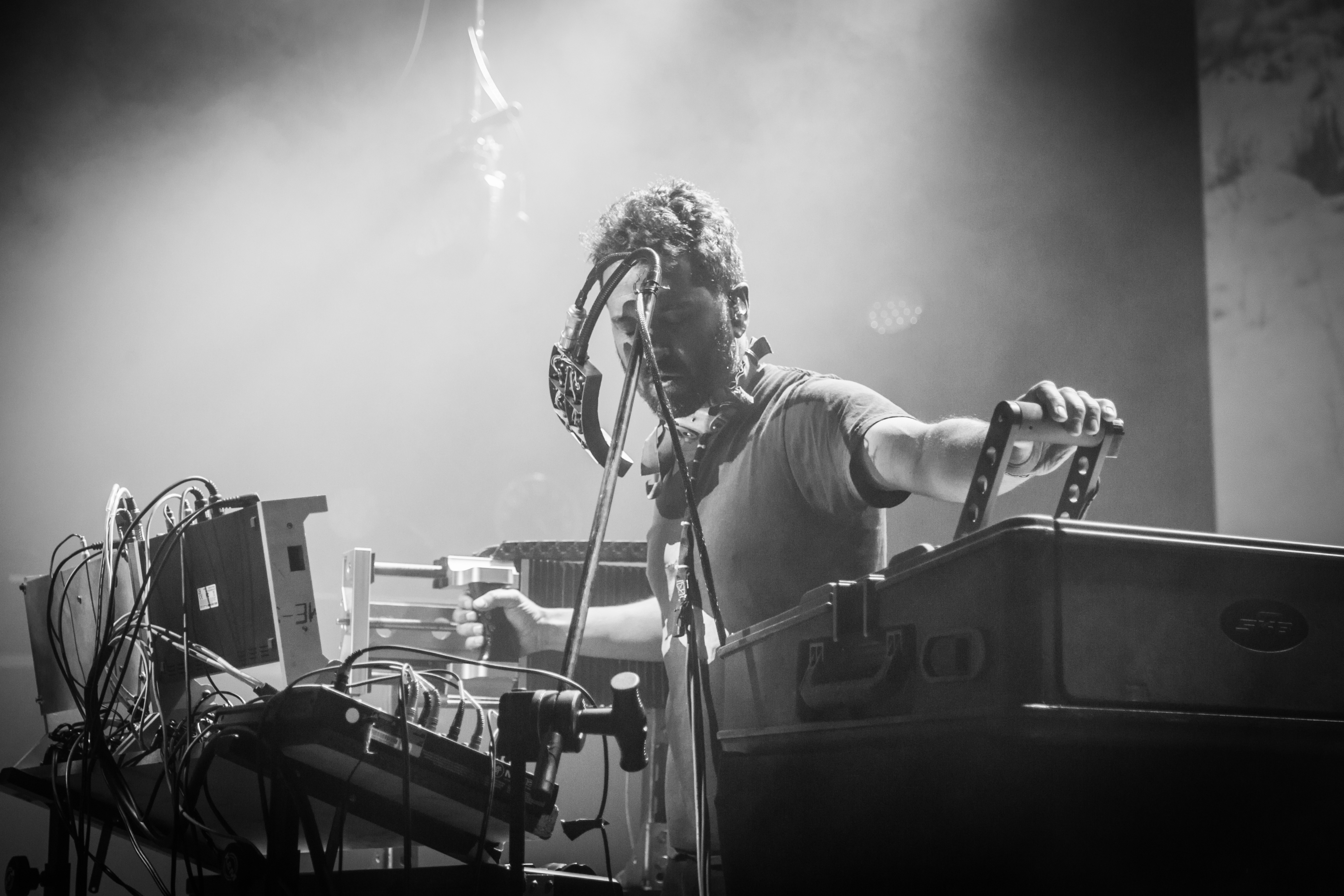
- Author & Punisher live at Roadburn Festival 2017

Background information
- Born: Tristan Shone; October 18, 1977 (age 48)
- Origin: San Diego, California, U.S.
- Genres: Industrial metal; drone metal; doom metal; art metal
- Years active: 2004–present
- Website: authorandpunisher.com

Author & Punisher is a one-man band from San Diego, formed in January 2004 by American mechanical engineer and artist Tristan Shone. Shone performs in a style based on industrial metal and drone music, using self-made devices he calls "Drone Machines" and "Dub Machines". Shone was inspired to build his own instruments to achieve the sound he wanted that conventional instruments could not accomplish, and also due to the difficulty in finding band members.

The name is a reference to a religious t-shirt that Shone wore in college. Shone said it was a way to poke fun at a bible verse that refers to Jesus as "author and finisher" (Hebrews 12:2).

Shone has released nine albums as Author & Punisher, with Melk en Honing (2015) and Pressure Mine (2017) released through Phil Anselmo's record label Housecore Records. Beastland (2018) was released on Relapse Records, which is Shone's current label. It was followed by Krüller (2022) which featured several guest musicians. For live dates after Krüller, Shone added guitarist Doug Sabolick making the first gigs he performed live with another musician as Author & Punisher. The most recent album is Nocturnal Birding (2025), which was released on October 3, 2025.

== Discography ==
=== Studio albums ===
Year	Title	Label
2005	The Painted Army	A&P Recordings
2010	Drone Machines	Heart & Crossbone
2012	Ursus Americanus	Seventh Rule Recordings
2013	Women & Children	Seventh Rule Recordings
2015	Melk en Honing	Housecore Records
2018	Beastland	Relapse Records
2022	Krüller	Relapse Records
2025	Nocturnal Birding	Relapse Records

=== EPs ===
Year	Title	Label
2007	Warcry	A&P Recordings
2017	Pressure Mine	Housecore Records

=== Live albums ===
Year	Title	Label
2020	Live B.C. 2020	Self-released
