= What Doesn't Kill Me... (Ektomorf album) =

Studio album by Ektomorf
- Released: 10 March 2009
- Recorded: Guitars, bass, and vocals at Antfarm Studio (Aarhus, Denmark); Drums at Feedback Studio (Aarhus, Denmark)
- Genre: Groove metal
- Length: 40:28
- Label: AFM
- Producer: Zoltán Farkas & Tue Madsen

Ektomorf chronology
Outcast (2006)	What Doesn't Kill Me... (2009)	Redemption (2010)

Professional ratings
Review scores
Source	Rating
AllMusic	2.5/5 stars
Metal Underground	2.5/5 stars
Stormbringer	4/5

What Doesn't Kill Me... is the eighth studio album by Hungarian groove metal band Ektomorf. The title alludes to the Nietzsche quote.

== Track listing ==
No.	Title	Length
1.	"Rat War"	2:04
2.	"Nothing Left"	2:17
3.	"What Doesn't Kill Me..."	2:31
4.	"Revenge to All"	3:12
5.	"Love and Live"	3:13
6.	"I Can See You"	3:38
7.	"I Got It All"	3:02
8.	"New Life"	3:17
9.	"Sick of It All" (Feat. Lord Nelson)	3:04
10.	"It's Up to You"	2:54
11.	"Envy"	2:54
12.	"Scream"	3:04
13.	"Breed the Fire"	3:03
14.	"Born for Destruction" (Exclusive Bonus Track on Limited Edition)	2:14

- All lyrics and music written by Zoltán Farkas, except lyrics of "Sick of It All" by Zoltán Farkas and Lord Nelson.

== Personnel ==
- Zoltán Farkas — vocals, guitars
- Tamás Schrottner — guitars
- Szabolcs Murvai — bass
- József Szakács — drums
