= Last Days of Eden =

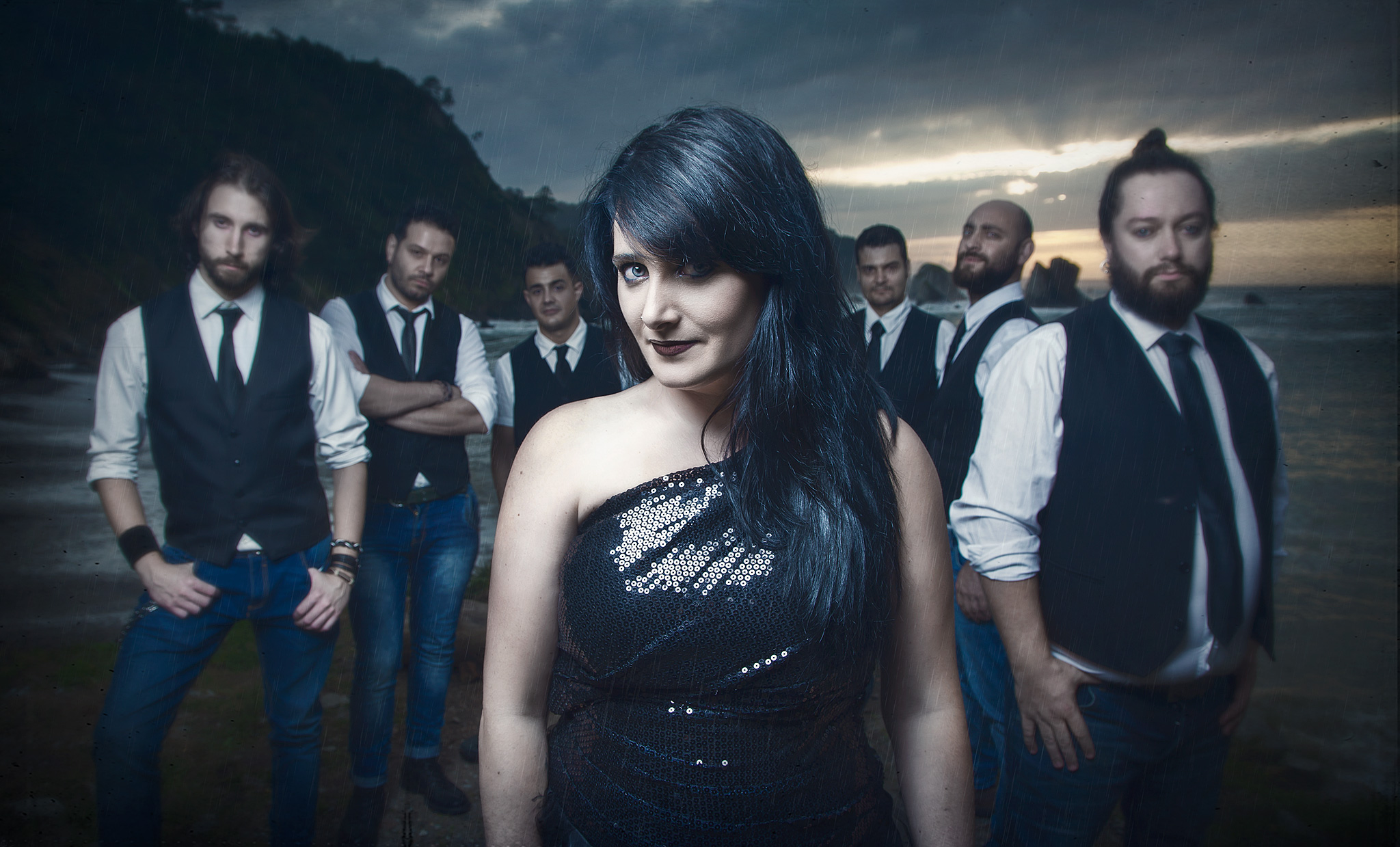

Background information
- Origin: Asturias, Spain
- Genres: Symphonic metal Power metal Folk metal
- Years active: 2013–present
- Labels: Pride & Joy Music / Edel Music
- Website: lastdaysofeden.es

Last Days of Eden is a Spanish symphonic power metal band from Asturias. It was founded in 2013 with members from the power metal band DarkSun. Their music mixes elements from symphonic metal with celtic music using the sound of bagpipes, whistles and flutes, making their sound quite similar to the recent albums of Nightwish.

== Members ==
- Lady Ani – female vocals
- Dani G. – guitars and male vocals
- Javy González – bass
- Leo Duarte – drums
- Sara Ember – violin
- Andrea Joglar – bagpipes, whistles and flutes

=== Past members ===
- Jorge Ruiz – bass
- Manuel Morán – drums
- Alberto Ardines – drums
- Chris Bada – drums
- Gustavo Rodríguez – bagpipes
- Pindy Díaz – bagpipes, whistles and flutes
- Juan Gomes – keyboards
- Adrián Huelga – bass

== Discography ==
=== EP ===
- Paradise – 2014

=== Albums ===
- Ride The World – 2015
- Traxel Mör – 2017
- Chrysalis – 2018
- Butterflies – 2021

=== Singles/music videos ===
- Paradise – 2014
- Invincible – 2015
- Here Come the Wolves (lyric video) – 2015
- The Piper's Call – 2016
- Ride the World (road movie) – 2016
- "The Garden" (2021)
- "Silence" (2021)
- "The Secret" (2021)
- "Save The World" (2021)
- "Lluz de Llucerín" (2021)
