= Aggressor (Ektomorf album) =

Studio album by Ektomorf
- Released: 30 October 2015
- Genre: Groove metal
- Length: 46:49
- Label: AFM
- Producer: Tue Madsen

Ektomorf chronology
Retribution (2014)	Aggressor (2015)	Fury (2018)

Aggressor is the thirteenth studio album by Hungarian groove metal band Ektomorf, released on 30 October 2015.

== Track listing ==
All Music and Lyrics by Zoltán Farkas:

1. "Intro" - 0:45
2. "I" - 3:49
3. "Aggressor" - 2:35
4. "Holocaust" - 3:56
5. "Move On" - 3:04
6. "Evil by Nature" (feat. George "Corpsegrinder" Fisher) - 4:22
7. "You Can't Get More" - 3:21
8. "Emotionless World" - 3:26
9. "Eastside" - 4:16
10. "Scars" - 3:42
11. "Damned Nation" - 2:38
12. "You Lost" - 2:56
13. "You're Not For Me" - 4:50
14. "Memento" - 3:03

== Personnel ==
Ektomorf

- Zoltán Farkas – vocals, guitar
- Tamás Schrottner – guitar
- Szabolcs Murvai – bass
- Robert Jaksa – drums

Additional musicians

George "Corpsegrinder" Fisher – guest vocals on "Evil by Nature"
