= Ektomorf =

Hungarian metal band

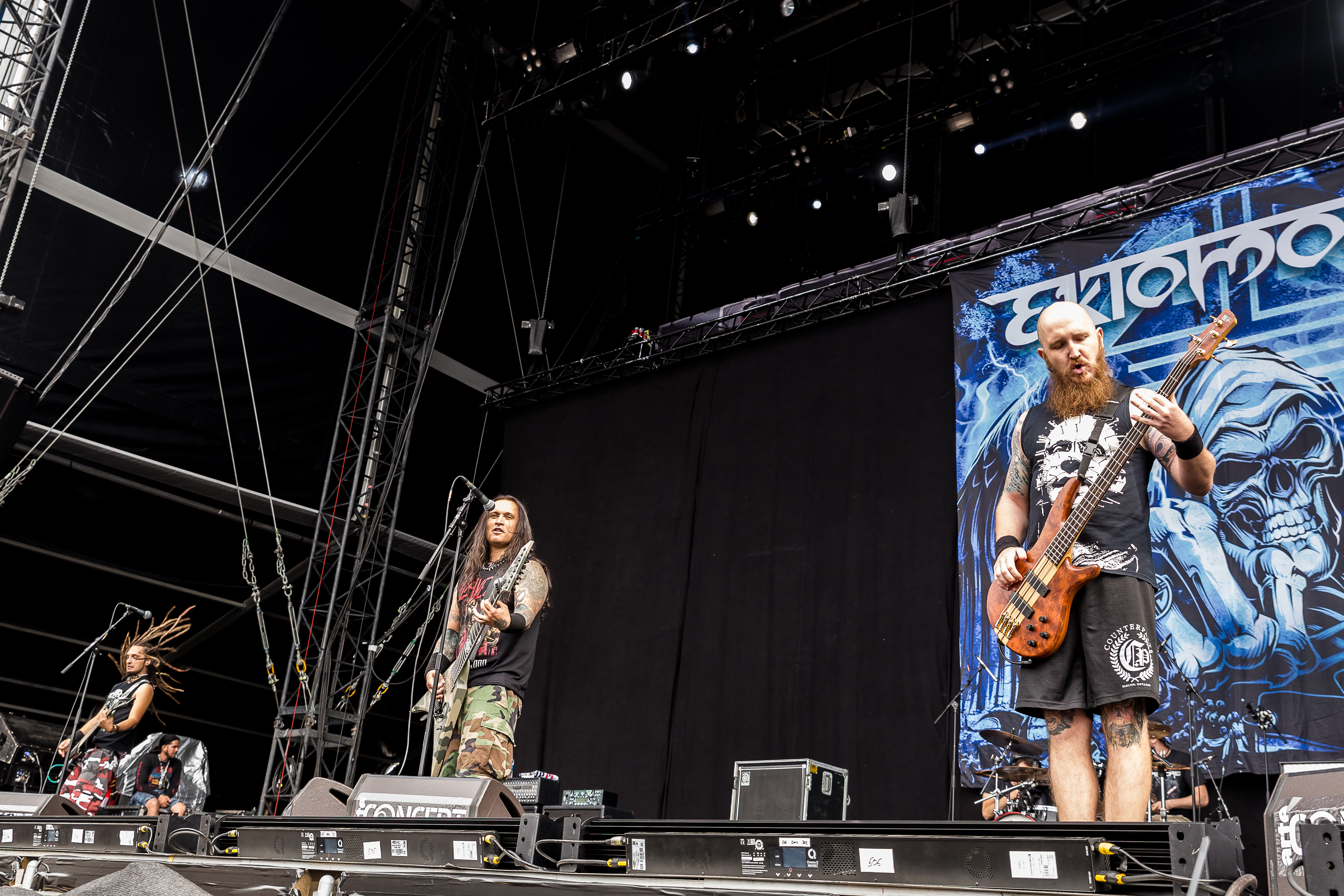
- Ektomorf at With Full Force 2018

Background information
- Origin: Mezőkovácsháza, Hungary
- Genres: Groove metal, nu metal
- Years active: 1994–present
- Labels: LMS Music (1996); KO Music (1998); PIAS Recordings (2000–2002); Silverdust (2002–2004); Nuclear Blast (2004–2008); AFM (2009–2020); Napalm Records (2020–)
- Members: Zoltán "Zoli/Zotya" Farkas; Ábris Hagya; Csaba Zahorán; Ákos Kobela

Ektomorf is a Hungarian groove metal band.

== History ==
Ektomorf was founded in 1993 in Mezőkovácsháza, Hungary, a small city near the Romanian border, by Zoltán "Zoli/Zotya" Farkas. In the actual lineup, Zoli/Zotya (songwriter and leader of the band) is the only remaining founder member. The band is completed by Ábris Hagya (lead guitar), Csaba Zahorán (bass) and Ákos Kobela (drums).

Due to his Romani background, Farkas saw himself confronted with racism and prejudices, which is why the band had to put years of work into its international career. Their breakthrough came when Ektomorf started collaboration with Danish producer Tue Madsen in 2003.

From 2002 to 2022, Ektomorf released sixteen studio albums and one live album. In September 2016, the band's single Az vagyok, aki voltam debuted on Rádió Rock 95.8.

The band is planning to play a concert in Moscow, Russia on May 14, 2025. This will be the first concert by a European metal band since Russia's open invasion of Ukraine in 2022.

== Members ==
- Zoltán "Zoli/Zotya" Farkas – vocals, rhythm guitar (1994–present)
- Ábris Hagya – lead guitar (2021–present)
- Csaba Zahorán – bass (2018-present)
- Ákos Kobela – drums (2022–present)
Ektomorf live at With Full Force 2018

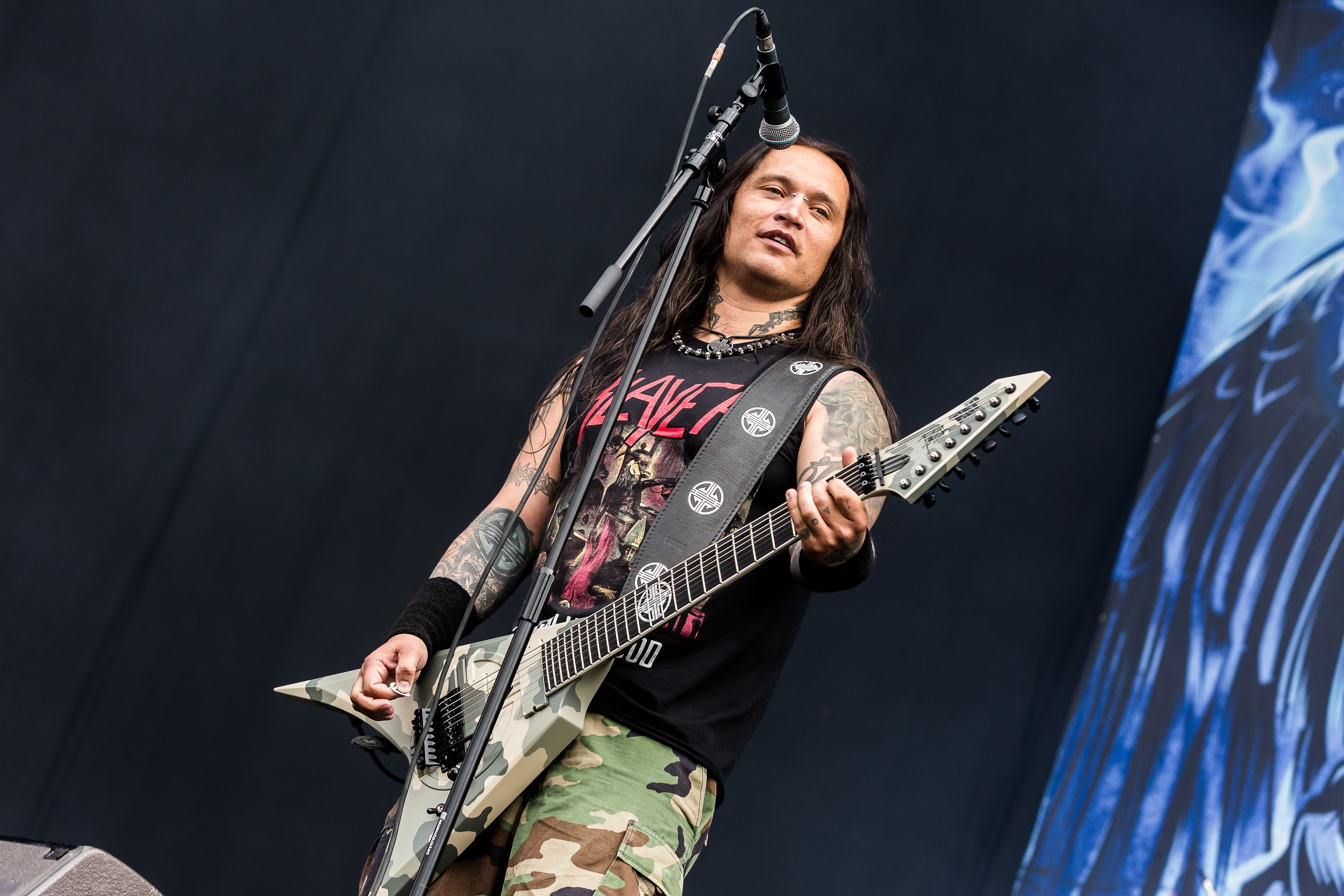
Zoltán Farkas

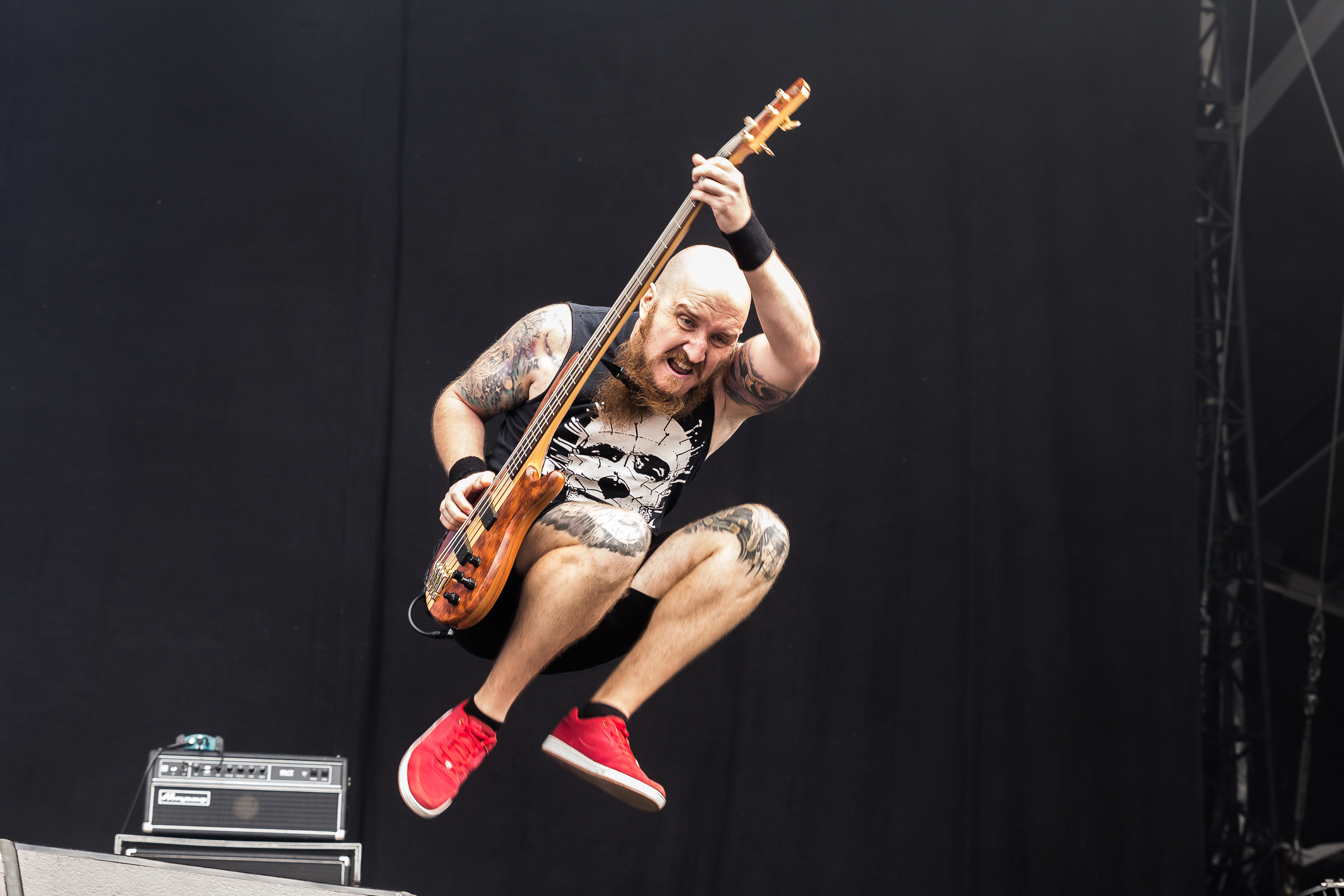
Csaba Zahorán

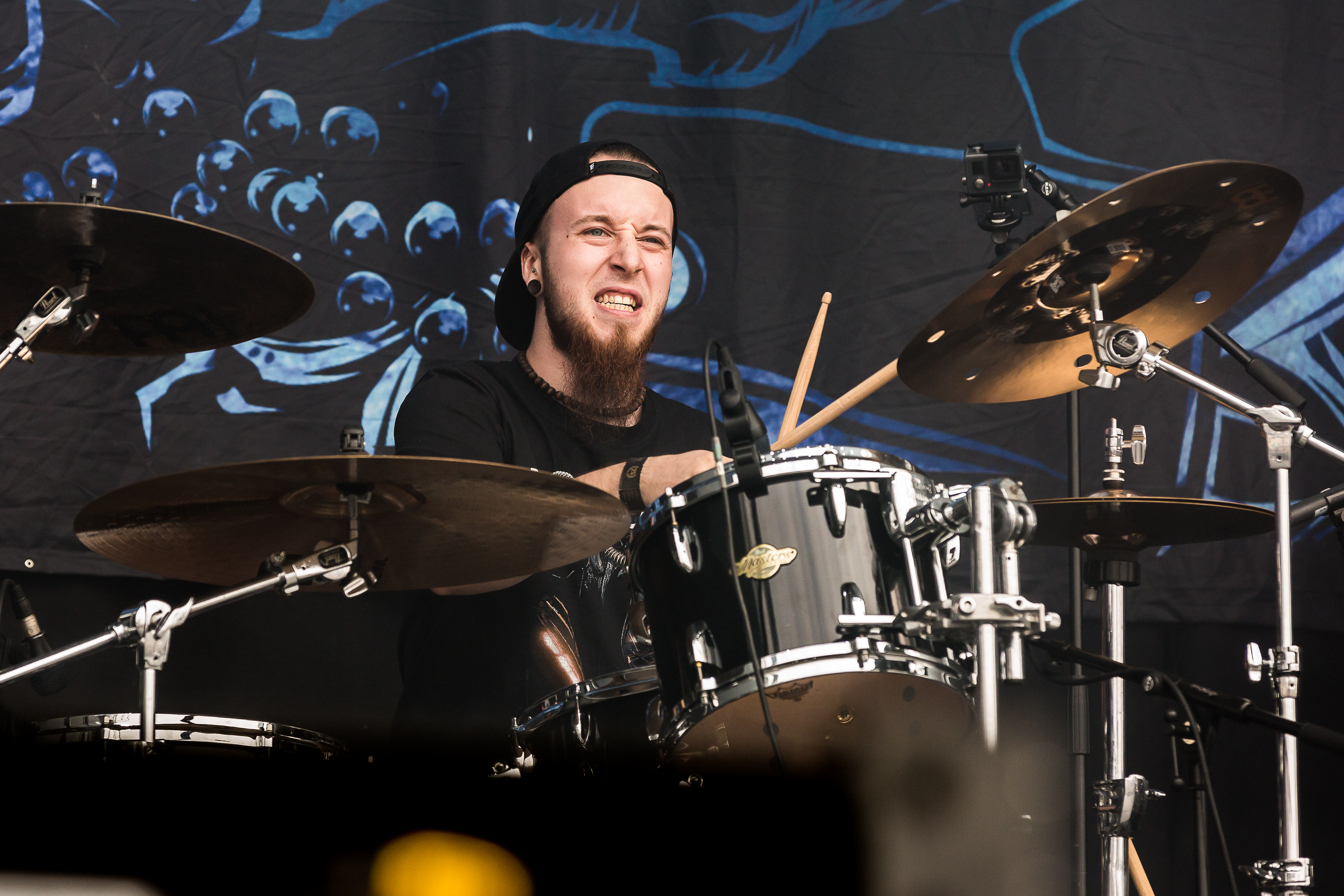
Dániel Szabó

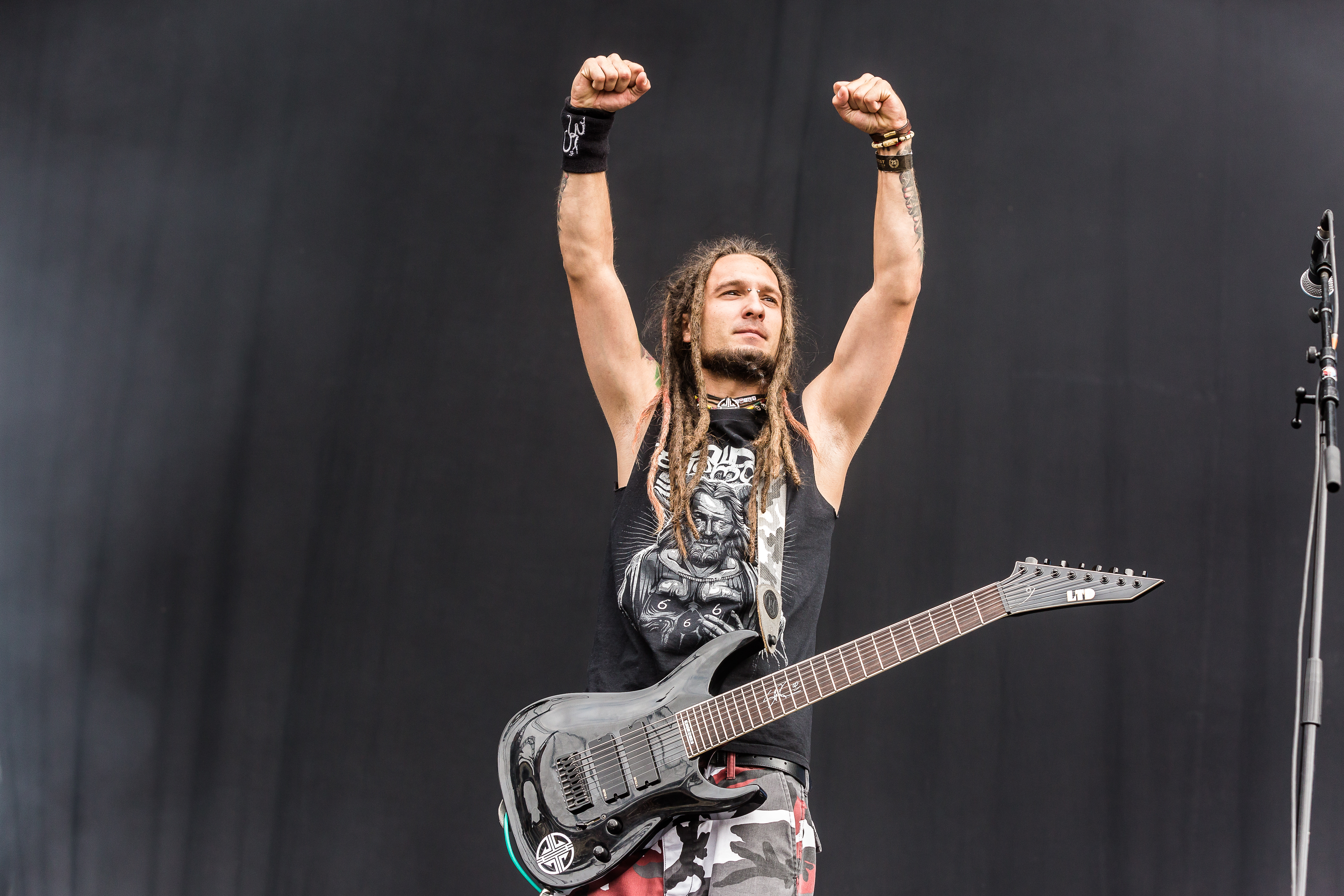
Szebasztián Simon

=== Former members ===
- Csaba Farkas – bass (1994–2008)
- Csaba Ternován – drums (1994–1998)
- Mihály "Müller" Janó – guitars (1994–1997, 1998–2000)
- Béla Marksteiner – guitars (1997–1998)
- József "Joci" Szakács – drums (1998–2009)
- László Kovács – guitars (2000–2002)
- Tamás Schrottner – guitars (2003–2010, 2012–2017)
- Szabolcs Murvai – bass (2009–2017)
- Gergely Homonnai – drums (2009)
- Michael "Mike" Rank – guitars (2010–2012)
- Gergely Tarin – drums (2010–2011)
- Róbert Jaksa – drums (2011–2017)
- Attila Asztalos – bass (2017-2018)
- Dániel Szabó – drums (2017-2019)
- Szebasztián Simon – (2017-2021)
- Kálmán Oláh – drums (2019-2022)

== Discography ==
- Hangok (1996)
- Ektomorf (1998)
- Kalyi Jag (2000)
- I Scream Up To The Sky / Felüvöltök Az Égbe (2002)
- Destroy (2004)
- Instinct (2005)
- Outcast (2006)
- What Doesn't Kill Me... (2009)
- Redemption (2010)
- The Acoustic (2012)
- Black Flag (2012)
- Retribution (2014)
- Aggressor (2015)
- Fury (2018)
- Reborn (2021)
- Vivid Black (2023)
- Heretic (2025)
