= Tomorrow's Eve (band) =

German progressive metal band

- Origin: Germany
- Genres: Progressive metal
- Years active: 1999 – present
- Label: Lion Music
- Members: Martin LeMar; Rainer Grund; Oliver Schwickert; Benedikt Zimniak; Tim Korycki
- Past members: Peter Webel; Rouven Bitz; Sascha Hilles; René Müller; Ralf Gottlieb; Oliver Jungmann; Chris Doerr; Tom Diener
- Website: www.t-eve.com

Tomorrow's Eve is a progressive metal band, that originated from Germany. The band has released four albums, the first being in 1999. They have played live shows as recently as September 2019 at the ProgPower USA festival in Atlanta, GA USA.

== Band members ==
- Martin LeMar – Vocals
- Rainer Grund – Guitar
- Oliver Schwickert – Keys
- Benedikt Zimniak – Bass
- Tim Korycki – Drums

== Discography ==
Title	Date
The Unexpected World	2000
Mirror Of Creation	2003
Mirror Of Creation 2 – Genesis II	2006
The Tower (EP)	2007
Tales From Serpentia	2008
Íkaros	2010
Mirror Of Creation III - Project Ikaros	2018
