= Redemption (Ektomorf album) =

Studio album by Ektomorf
- Released: 17 December 2010
- Genre: Groove metal, nu metal
- Length: 41:23
- Label: AFM

Ektomorf chronology
What Doesn't Kill Me... (2009)	Redemption (2010)	Black Flag (2012)

Professional ratings
Review scores
Source	Rating
Laut.de	2/5 stars
Metal Hammer	5/7 stars
Rock Hard	7/10
Soundi	3/5 stars

Redemption is the ninth studio album by the Hungarian groove metal band Ektomorf, released on 17 December 2010.

== Track listing ==
1. "Last Fight" - 4:16
2. "Redemption" - 2:51
3. "I'm in Hate" - 3:25
4. "God Will Cut You Down" - 3:04
5. "Stay Away" - 2:25
6. "Never Should" - 4:21
7. "Sea of My Misery" - 2:12
8. "The One" (feat. Danko Jones) - 3:40
9. "Revolution" - 3:48
10. "Cigany" - 3:08
11. "Stigmatized" - 4:38
12. "Anger" - 3:28
13. "Kill Me Now" (limited edition digipak bonus track)
