= 2014 in heavy metal music =

This is a timeline documenting the events of heavy metal in the year 2014.

== Bands formed ==
- 1914
- Act of Defiance
- Beyond the Black
- Black Pantera
- Enterprise Earth
- Entombed A.D.
- The Gentle Storm
- Hellripper
- Mardelas
- Mental Cruelty
- The Mute Gods
- Myrkur
- Signs of the Swarm
- Vulvodynia

== Bands disbanded ==
- Bleeding Through
- Brutal Truth
- Chimaira
- Light Bringer
- Massacre
- Pestilence
- The Soulless

== Bands reformed ==
- Aftermath
- Atreyu (hiatus during 2011–2014)
- Breaking Benjamin (hiatus during 2010–2014)
- Centinex
- From Autumn to Ashes
- Haste the Day
- Life of Agony

== Events ==
- On January 6, Benighted announced the departure of bassist Eric Lombard, and Alexis Lieu as his replacement.
- On January 10, bassist Dan Lilker (Nuclear Assault, Brutal Truth, ex-Anthrax) announced that he will be retiring from being a full-time musician on October 18, which will be his 50th birthday. He also announced that Brutal Truth will split up.
- On January 13, Testament announced the departure of bassist Greg Christian, and Steve Di Giorgio (who was part of the band from 1998 to 2004) as his replacement.
- On January 16, In Mourning announced that they have parted ways with drummer Christian Netzell. And on April 2, they introduced Mattias Bender as their new drummer.
- On January 26, Black Sabbath's "God Is Dead?" won this year's Grammy Award for Best Metal Performance. This was their first Grammy Award in 14 years, since their live version of "Iron Man" won the same category.
- On February 6, The Ronnie James Dio Stand Up and Shout Cancer Fund announced This is Your Life, a tribute album to celebrate the life and legacy of Ronnie James Dio. Covers of his songs from Rainbow, Black Sabbath and Dio will be performed by various artists: Metallica, Motörhead, Rob Halford (Judas Priest, Halford), Anthrax, Corey Taylor (Slipknot, Stone Sour), Halestorm, Killswitch Engage and many more.
- On February 12, Marky Edelmann (a.k.a. Marquis Marky) announced plans to leave Coroner at the end of February.
- On February 14, Lacuna Coil announced via their Facebook page that their guitarist Cristiano 'Pizza' Migliore and drummer Cristiano 'Criz' Mozzati have decided to retire from the band after 16 years citing personal reasons.
- On February 21, Per ‘Sodomizer’ Eriksson announced his departure from Katatonia and will be temporarily replaced by Bruce Soord (The Pineapple Thief, Wisdom of Crowds) and Tomas Åkvik (Nale) respectively.
- On February 24, Guitarist John Ricci announced his departure from Exciter due to his decision to retire from the music industry, and, on April 4, it was announced that bassist Rob "Clammy" Cohen will also part ways with the band due to both personal and business issues.
- On March 17, it was announced that Angela Gossow had left Arch Enemy but would remain as the band's manager. She is replaced by Alissa White-Gluz, former vocalist of The Agonist. On the same day, The Agonist have announced they have parted ways with Alissa and that Vicky Psarakis had taken over as their new vocalist.
- On March 31, Equilibrium announced that Andreas Völkl and Sandra Van Eldik, the founding members of their band, were leaving the band for unspecified reasons.
- On April 17, Daniel Liljekvist quit Katatonia, and was temporarily replaced by JP Asplund and Daniel Moilanen (ex-Engel) respectively.
- On April 25–26, Jag Panzer reunited for this year's edition of Keep It True Festival in Germany.
- On May 16, As I Lay Dying and Austrian Death Machine frontman Tim Lambesis was sentenced to six years in prison with a 48 days credit for custody already served for his role in a murder-for-hire plot to kill his wife.
- On June 8, Exodus announced the departure of their singer Rob Dukes. On the same day, they announced their reunion with Steve "Zetro" Souza, who was the singer of Exodus from 1986 to 1992, and again from 2002 to 2004.
- On July 10, Voivod announced the departure of bassist Jean-Yves "Blacky" Thériault for the second time.
- On August 19, Phil Anselmo announced that Superjoint Ritual would reunite for this year's Housecore Horror Film Festival under the name Superjoint.
- On November 17, Arch Enemy announced the departure of guitarist Nick Cordle and announced former Nevermore guitarist Jeff Loomis as his replacement.
- On November 25, drummer Shawn Drover announced his departure from Megadeth citing a desire to pursue his own musical interests.
- On November 26, guitarist Chris Broderick announced his departure from Megadeth due to musical differences.
- On November 26, drummer Kelly David-Smith announced his departure from Flotsam and Jetsam to focus on his family.
- On December 28, guitarist Herman Frank announced his second departure from Accept. Later that day, Accept announced that drummer Stefan Schwarzmann also left the band.
- In 2014, Mötley Crüe embarked on their farewell The Final Tour, which concluded with their last show on 31 December 2015 at Los Angeles’ Staples Center. The band later reunited in 2019 and announced The Stadium Tour, co-headlining with Def Leppard.
- In 2014, Vixen's surviving members resurrected the band in honor of the fallen Jan Kuehnemund, guitarist and founder of the band. They will perform at select festivals and showcase dates.

== Deaths ==
- January 29 – Pete Hurley, founding member and former guitarist of Extreme Noise Terror, died from undisclosed reasons.
- February 17 – Bob Casale, also known as "Bob 2" and the rhythm guitarist and keyboardist of Devo, died from heart failure at the age of 61.
- March 23 – Dave Brockie (a.k.a. Oderus Urungus), vocalist of Gwar, died from accidental opioid overdose at the age of 50.
- March 24 – Paulo Schroeber, former guitarist of Almah, died from heart failure at the age of 40.
- April 5 – Jason McCash, former bassist of The Gates of Slumber, died from heroin overdose at the age of 37.
- April 15 – Shane Gibson, former touring guitarist of KoЯn, died from result of complications from a blood clotting disorder at the age of 35.
- April 23 – Mike Atta, guitarist of Middle Class, died from kidney and lung cancer at the age of 53.
- May 11 – Ed Gagliardi, former bassist of Foreigner, died from cancer at the age of 62.
- May 12 – H. R. Giger, Swiss artist who provided artwork for numerous rock and metal bands such as KoЯn, Celtic Frost, Emerson, Lake & Palmer, Dead Kennedys, Danzig and Atrocity, died after being hospitalized for injuries sustained after he tripped and fell downstairs in his home at the age of 74.
- May 13 – Akihiro Yokoyama, bassist of United, died from undisclosed reasons at the age of 49.
- May 20 – Randy Coven, bassist for Ark, Steve Vai and Yngwie Malmsteen, died from cardiac arrest at the age of 55.
- June 1 – Victor Agnello, former drummer of Lȧȧz Rockit, died of leukemia at the age of 50.
- June 4 – Doc Neeson, former vocalist and bassist of The Angels, died from a brain tumor at the age of 67.
- July 30 – Fausto Fanti (a.k.a. Blondie Hammett), former guitarist and humorist of Massacration, died from suicide at the age of 35.
- July 30 – Dick Wagner, former guitarist for Alice Cooper, died from respiratory failure at the age of 71.
- August 10 – Maria Kolokouri (a.k.a. Tristessa), vocalist of all-female band Astarte, died from complications from leukemia at the age of 37.
- August 27 – Tim Williams (a.k.a. Rawbiz), bassist of Suicidal Tendencies, died from seizure at the age of 31.
- October 19 – James Levesque, bassist of Agent Orange, died from unspecified causes at the age of 52.
- October 25 – Jack Bruce, bassist of Cream, died peacefully at home at the age of 71.
- November 1 – Wayne Static, vocalist and guitarist of Static-X, died from combined drug intoxication at the age of 48.
- November 9 – Jonathan Athon, bassist and vocalist of Black Tusk, died due to injuries sustained from a motorcycle accident at the age of 32.
- November 19 – Riff West, former bassist of Molly Hatchet, died from lengthy illness caused by severe injuries suffered in a car accident at the age of 64.

== Albums released ==
=== January ===
Day	Artist	Album
6	Iced Earth	Plagues of Babylon
6	James LaBrie	I Will Not Break (EP)
10	Skull Fist	Chasing the Dream
13	Suicidal Angels	Divide and Conquer
17	Axel Rudi Pell	Into the Storm
17	Chrome Division	Infernal Rock Eternal
17	Nashville Pussy	Up the Dosage
20	The Haunted	Eye of the Storm (EP)
21	Alcest	Shelter
21	Nine Inch Nails	Remix 2014 EP (EP)
21	Persuader	The Fiction Maze
21	Throwdown	Intolerance
22	Within Temptation	Hydra
24	Caliban	Ghost Empire
24	Elysion	Someplace Better
24	Primal Fear	Delivering the Black
27	Kampfar	Djevelmakt
27	Hammercult	Steelcrusher
27	Sister	Disguised Vultures
27	Skindred	Kill the Power
27	Transatlantic	Kaleidoscope
28	Metallica	Metallica Through the Never (DVD)
28	Periphery	Clear (EP)
31	Ektomorf	Retribution
31	Grand Magus	Triumph and Power
31	Lake of Tears	By the Black Sea (DVD)
31	Mayan	Antagonise

=== February ===
Day	Artist	Album
1	Dark Tranquillity	A Memory Construct (EP)
1	Skull & Bones	The Cursed Island
4	Behemoth	The Satanist
4	For Today	Fight the Silence
4	Truckfighters	Universe
7	Stam1na	SLK
7	Van Canto	Dawn of the Brave
14	Amoral	Fallen Leaves & Dead Sparrows
14	Benighted	Carnivore Sublime
14	Cynic	Kindly Bent to Free Us
14	Flotsam and Jetsam	No Place For Disgrace 2014
15	Acidez	Beer Drinkers Survivors
18	Adrenaline Mob	Men of Honor
18	I Killed the Prom Queen	Beloved
18	Slough Feg	Digital Resistance
21	Battleaxe	Heavy Metal Sanctuary
21	Vanishing Point	Distant Is the Sun
24	Crematory	Antiserum
24	Freedom Call	Beyond
24	Hirax	Immortal Legacy
24	Vanden Plas	Chronicles of the Immortals – Netherworld (Path 1)
26	Babymetal	Babymetal
28	Axxis	Kingdom of the Night II
28	Iron Savior	Rise of the Hero
28	Manowar	Kings of Metal MMXIV

=== March ===
Day	Artist	Album
1	Aurora Borealis	Worldshapers
3	Earth Crisis	Salvation of Innocents
3	Gojira	Les Enfants Sauvages (Live)
4	Wolves Like Us	Black Soul Choir
4	Destrage	"'Are You Kidding Me? No."
7	Carnifex	Die Without Hope
7	Dawn of Destiny	F.E.A.R.
10	Savage Messiah	The Fateful Dark
11	Architects	Lost Forever // Lost Together
11	Nocturnal Breed	Napalm Nights
14	Dirge	Hyperion
14	Profane Omen	Reset
17	Gus G	I Am the Fire
18	Demon Hunter	Extremist
24	Magnum	Escape from the Shadow Garden
24	Massacre	Back from Beyond
25	Animals as Leaders	The Joy of Motion
25	Gamma Ray	Empire of the Undead
25	Memphis May Fire	Unconditional
25	Sinbreed	Shadows
25	Sonata Arctica	Pariah's Child
25	Thou	Heathen
28	Anette Olzon	Shine
28	Trollfest	Kaptein Kaos

=== April ===
Day	Artist	Album
1	Austrian Death Machine	Triple Brutal
1	Lacuna Coil	Broken Crown Halo
1	Steel Panther	All You Can Eat
4	Brainstorm	Firesoul
4	Delain	The Human Contradiction
7	Black Label Society	Catacombs of the Black Vatican
7	Gotthard	Bang!
14	Impaled Nazarene	Vigorous and Liberating Death
14	Triptykon	Melana Chasmata
15	Anubis Gate	Horizons
15	Lillian Axe	One Night in the Temple (Live)
15	Sevendust	Time Travelers & Bonfires
18	Edguy	Space Police: Defenders of the Crown
18	Stream of Passion	A War of Our Own
21	Autopsy	Tourniquets, Hacksaws and Graves
22	Joe Satriani	The Complete Studio Recordings (Box Set)
22	Sebastian Bach	Give 'Em Hell
22	Winger	Better Days Comin'
25	Arkona	Yav
25	Deep Machine	Rise of the Machine
25	Light the Torch	The Beauty of Destruction
25	Helstar	This Wicked Nest
25	Mekong Delta	In a Mirror Darkly
25	Savn	Savn
28	Aborted	The Necrotic Manifesto
28	Holy Moses	Redefined Mayhem
29	Insomnium	Shadows of the Dying Sun
29	Eye of the Enemy	The Vengeance Paradox

=== May ===
Day	Artist	Album
2	Epica	The Quantum Enigma
2	Stratovarius	Nemesis Days (DVD)
2	Xandria	Sacrificium
9	Elvenking	The Pagan Manifesto
9	Killer Be Killed	Killer Be Killed
13	Agalloch	The Serpent & the Sphere
13	Avatar	Hail the Apocalypse
13	Down	Down IV – Part II (EP)
13	Mushroomhead	The Righteous & the Butterfly
13	Prong	Ruining Lives
13	Teitanblood	Death
16	Avalon	Angels of the Apocalypse
16	Sabaton	Heroes
22	Gory Blister	The Fifth Fury
23	Misery Index	The Killing Gods
23	Rage	The Soundchaser Archives (Compilation)
23	Unisonic	For the Kingdom (EP)
26	Bury Tomorrow	Runes
26	Christopher Lee	Metal Knight (EP)
26	Crowbar	Symmetry in Black
27	Black Anvil	Hail Death
27	Eyehategod	Eyehategod
27	Marty Friedman	Inferno
27	Ravenscry	The Attraction of Opposites
30	Die Apokalyptischen Reiter	Tief.Tiefer
30	Dust Bolt	Awake the Riot
30	Vader	Tibi et Igni

=== June ===
Day	Artist	Album
2
2	Godflesh	Decline & Fall (EP)
2	Voyager	V
4	Arch Enemy	War Eternal
4	Loudness	The Sun Will Rise Again
6	Cloven Hoof	Resist or Serve
6	Equilibrium	Erdentempel
6	Falconer	Black Moon Rising
6	Mayhem	Esoteric Warfare
6	Tesla	Simplicity
6	Uriah Heep	Outsider
10	The Amity Affliction	Let the Ocean Take Me
10	The Atlas Moth	The Old Believer
10	Hellyeah	Blood for Blood
10	Incantation	Dirges of Elysium
10	Tombs	Savage Gold
10	The Word Alive	Real
10	Wretched	Cannibal
13	Deathstars	The Perfect Cult
20	Cannabis Corpse	From Wisdom to Baked
20	Tankard	R.I.B.
24	Corrosion of Conformity	IX
24	Kobra and the Lotus	High Priestess
24	Mastodon	Once More 'Round the Sun
24	Mournful Congregation	Concrescence of the Sophia (EP)
24	Septicflesh	Titan
27	Amberian Dawn	Magic Forest
27	Illdisposed	With the Lost Souls on Our Side
27	Quiet Riot	Quiet Riot 10
27	Vintersorg	Naturbål

=== July ===
Day	Artist	Album
4	Origin	Omnipresent
4	Sonic Syndicate	Sonic Syndicate
8	Chelsea Grin	Ashes to Ashes
8	Goatwhore	Constricting Rage of the Merciless
8	Scars of Tomorrow	Failed Transmissions
8	Starset	Transmissions
8	Steel Prophet	Omniscient
8	Wolves in the Throne Room	Celestite
11	Grave Digger	Return of the Reaper
11	Suicide Silence	You Can't Stop Me
13	Demonic Resurrection	The Demon King
14	Judas Priest	Redeemer of Souls
15	Novembers Doom	Bled White
18	Empyrium	The Turn of the Tides
18	Overkill	White Devil Armory
19	Detonator e as Musas do Metal	Metal Folclore: The Zoeira Never Ends...
21	Downset.	One Blood
22	Fozzy	Do You Wanna Start a War
22	Ill Niño	Till Death, La Familia
22	Within the Ruins	Phenomena
25	Crystal Eyes	Killer
29	Theory of a Deadman	Savages

=== August ===
Day	Artist	Album
1	Alestorm	Sunset on the Golden Age
1	Eluveitie	Origins
4	Entombed A.D.	Back to the Front
4	Skid Row	Rise of the Damnation Army – United World Rebellion: Chapter Two (EP)
5	Darkest Hour	Darkest Hour
5	Godsmack	1000hp
5	Kix	Rock Your Face Off
5	Pathology	Throne of Reign
11	Belphegor	Conjuring the Dead
12	Upon a Burning Body	The World Is My Enemy Now
15	Accept	Blind Rage
15	Deadlock	The Re-Arrival
18	DragonForce	Maximum Overload
19	Ace Frehley	Space Invader
19	Pallbearer	Foundations of Burden
22	Machinae Supremacy	Phantom Shadow
25	The Haunted	Exit Wounds
25	Wolf	Devil Seed
26	Opeth	Pale Communion
27	HammerFall	(r)Evolution
29	Astral Doors	Notes from the Shadows
29	Sólstafir	Ótta

=== September ===
Day	Artist	Album
1	Aeon Zen	Ephemera
1	Dark Fortress	Venereal Dawn
1	Horned Almighty	World of Tombs
2	Incite	Up in Hell
5	Any Given Day	My Longest Way Home
5	In Flames	Siren Charms
9	A Sound of Thunder	The Lesser Key of Solomon
15	Xerath	III
16	Cannibal Corpse	A Skeletal Domain
16	Motionless in White	Reincarnate
16	Texas in July	Bloodwork
19	Mr. Big	...The Stories We Could Tell
19	Threshold	For the Journey
23	Affiance	Blackout
26	Decapitated	Blood Mantra
26	Evergrey	Hymns for the Broken
26	Lyriel	Skin and Bones
29	1349	Massive Cauldron of Chaos
29	Audrey Horne	Pure Heavy
29	Electric Wizard	Time to Die
30	Nonpoint	The Return
30	Witch Mountain	Mobile of Angels

=== October ===
Day	Artist	Album
4	Northern Oak	Of Roots and Flesh
6	Acid Drinkers	25 Cents for a Riff
6	Sanctuary	The Year the Sun Died
7	Godflesh	A World Lit Only by Fire
7	Rigor Mortis	Slaves to the Grave
7	Texas Hippie Coalition	Ride On
14	The Acacia Strain	Coma Witch
14	Exodus	Blood In, Blood Out
14	Ozzy Osbourne	Memoirs of a Madman
14	Revocation	Deathless
14	Rings of Saturn	Lugal Ki En
14	Rosetta	Flies to Flame (EP)
14	Satanic Warmaster	Fimbulwinter
14	Scar Symmetry	The Singularity (Phase I – Neohumanity)
16	Kayo Dot	Coffins on Io
21	Alice Cooper	Raise the Dead – Live from Wacken (DVD)
21	Amaranthe	Massive Addictive
21	Slipknot	.5: The Gray Chapter
24	Kingfisher Sky	Arms of Morpheus
24	Liv Kristine	Vervain
24	While Heaven Wept	Suspended at Aphelion
25	Vesania	Deus ex Machina
27	As Blood Runs Black	Ground Zero
27	Devin Townsend	Z²
27	Einherjer	Av Oss, for Oss
27	Haken	Restoration (EP)
27	Sister Sin	Black Lotus
28	Abysmal Dawn	Obsolescence
28	Anaal Nathrakh	Desideratum
28	At the Gates	At War with Reality
28	Giant Squid	Minoans
28	Obituary	Inked in Blood
28	Riot V	Unleash the Fire
28	Unearth	Watchers of Rule
30	Warmen	First of the Five Elements
31	Cavalera Conspiracy	Pandemonium
31	Lordi	Scare Force One

=== November ===
Day	Artist	Album
1	Behemoth	Xiądz (EP)
3	Nader Sadek	The Malefic: Chapter III (EP)
4	The Skull	For Those Which Are Asleep
7	Machine Head	Bloodstone & Diamonds
7	Ne Obliviscaris	Citadel
7	Triosphere	The Heart Of The Matter
10	Skyharbor	Guiding Lights
10	Nightingale	Retribution
11	Carcass	Surgical Remission / Surplus Steel (EP)
11	Job for a Cowboy	Sun Eater
11	Monster Magnet	Milking the Stars: A Re-Imagining of Last Patrol
11	Skálmöld	Með vættum
17	Bloodbath	Grand Morbid Funeral
17	In This Moment	Black Widow
17	Thanatos	Global Purification
18	Cadaveria	Silence
18	Satan	Trail of Fire – Live in North America
21	Bloodbound	Stormborn
21	Centinex	Redeeming Filth
21	Cripper	Hyëna
21	The Duskfall	Where the Tree Stands Dead
22	Fen	Carrion Skies
25	Aria	Through All Times
25	Primordial	Where Greater Men Have Fallen
28	Axenstar	Where Dreams Are Forgotten
28	Sodom	Sacred Warpath (EP)

=== December ===
Day	Artist	Album
1	Avenger	The Slaughter Never Stops
5	Cruachan	Blood for the Blood God
5	Mors Principium Est	Dawn of the 5th Era
8	Pythia	Shadows of a Broken Past
8	Taake	Stridens hus
10	Dir En Grey	Arche
17	Angra	Secret Garden
25	The Project Hate MCMXCIX	There Is No Earth I Will Leave Unscorched
31	Holy Blood	Day of Vengeance

Preceded by 2013	Heavy Metal Timeline; 2014	Succeeded by 2015
