= Vengeful Ascension =

Studio album by Goatwhore
- Released: June 23, 2017
- Genres: Blackened death metal, thrash metal
- Length: 41:53
- Label: Metal Blade

Goatwhore chronology
Constricting Rage of the Merciless (2014)	Vengeful Ascension (2017)	Angels Hung from the Arches of Heaven (2022)

Vengeful Ascension is the seventh studio album by blackened death metal band Goatwhore, released on June 23, 2017, by Metal Blade Records. This was the last album to feature bassist James Harvey, who departed the same year.

In addition to the standard release, a special "Spell Book" edition was also released, limited to 3000 copies. This edition includes a 40-page hardcover book containing lyrics and imagery relating to the album, the album itself on CD, and a bonus CD containing 13 additional tracks featuring several live recordings, cover songs, etc.

== Track listing ==
No.	Title	Length
1.	"Forsaken"	3:40
2.	"Under the Flesh, Into the Soul"	4:33
3.	"Vengeful Ascension"	4:14
4.	"Chaos Arcane"	3:57
5.	"Where the Sun Is Silent"	4:35
6.	"Drowned in Grim Rebirth"	4:14
7.	"Abandon Indoctrination"	4:19
8.	"Mankind Will Have No Mercy"	3:48
9.	"Decayed Omen Reborn"	4:25
10.	"Those Who Denied God's Will"	4:08
Total length:		41:53

Bonus CD (included in the limited edition "Spell Book" release)

No.	Title	Length
1.	"Alchemy of the Black Sun Cult" (Live in Cincinnati, OH - March 1, 2017)	3:31
2.	"Collapse in Eternal Worth" (Live in Cincinnati, OH - March 1, 2017)	4:01
3.	"In Deathless Tradition" (Live in Phoenix, AZ - December 5, 2015)	4:30
4.	"Cold Earth Consumed in Dying Flesh" (Live in Phoenix, AZ - December 5, 2015)	4:25
5.	"FBS" (Live in Phoenix, AZ - December 5, 2015)	3:51
6.	"The All-Destroying" (Live in Phoenix, AZ - December 5, 2015)	3:30
7.	"Parasitic Scriptures of the Sacred World" (Unreleased live bonus track from Constricting Rage of the Merciless)	3:30
8.	"(Don't Need) Religion" (Motörhead cover & Japanese bonus track from Blood for the Master)	2:36
9.	"Between the Immense and the Dead" (Digital edition bonus track from Carving Out the Eyes of God)	4:01
10.	"Alchemy of the Black Sun Cult" (Live Japanese bonus track from Carving Out the Eyes of God)	3:39
11.	"In the Narrow Confines of Defilement" (Live Japanese bonus track from Carving Out the Eyes of God)	4:56
12.	"Under a Funeral Moon" (Darkthrone cover & Japanese bonus track from A Haunting Curse)	4:17
13.	"Into the Crypt of Rays" (Celtic Frost cover from the Goatwhore/Epoch of Unlight split EP)	3:49
Total length:		50:43

== Personnel ==
- L. Ben Falgoust II – lead vocals
- Sammy Duet – guitars, backing vocals
- James Harvey – bass
- Zack Simmons – drums
