= Great Gate of Kyiv =

Great Gate of Kyiv, which is also known as one of the Bogatyr Gates of Kyiv:

- Golden Gate, Kyiv 11th century gate of Kyiv and 20th century reconstruction as a museum
- The Bogatyr Gates (In the Capital in Kyiv), movement 10 of Pictures at an Exhibition by Modest Mussorgsky, also known as "The Great Gate of Kyiv"
- The Wanderer (Holy Blood album)#1. "Bogatyr Gates in Capital Town in Kyiv" track on album by Ukrainian folk metal group "Holy Blood"
