= Leveling the Plane of Existence =

Studio album by Abysmal Dawn
- Released: February 1, 2011
- Recorded: May–September 2010
- Studio: Artisan Road Studios (guitars, bass and vocals); Trench Studios (drums)
- Genre: Death metal
- Length: 38:58
- Label: Relapse

Abysmal Dawn chronology
Programmed to Consume (2008)	Leveling the Plane of Existence (2011)	Obsolescence (2014)

Professional ratings
Review scores
Source	Rating
AllMusic	3.5/5
Blabbermouth	8/10
Metal.de	5/10

Leveling the Plane of Existence is the third full-length album from American death metal band Abysmal Dawn which was released on February 1, 2011 in the United States, and February 14 worldwide through Relapse Records. It is to be considered as a follow-up to their previous release Programmed to Consume which was released in 2008.

== Album information ==
Abysmal Dawn began recording Leveling the Plane of Existence in May 2010. The drums were recorded at Trench Studios in Corona, California with John Haddad with the rest of the instrumentation being produced and recorded by Mike Bear at Artisan Road Studios in Encino, California. This album was being mixed and mastered by Erik Rutan at Mana Recording Studios in St. Petersburg, Florida.

Charles Elliot commented on the album;

"After a series of set backs, illness, and going through a world of shit in our personal lives, we had no choice but to make this record our revenge and the defining moment for Abysmal Dawn. We've had the finished mixes for about a week now and everyone that has heard it has been just blown away. We can already tell that this will be the record that the band will become known for. It's a very varied, extreme, technical, and melodic record and I can promise you that no one will be disappointed."

== Track listing ==
All lyrics are written by Charles Elliot; all music is composed by Abysmal Dawn.

No.	Title	Length
1.	"The Age of Ruin"	1:40
2.	"Pixilated Ignorance"	3:50
3.	"In Service of Time"	4:48
4.	"Rapture Renowned"	4:27
5.	"Our Primitive Nature"	0:56
6.	"Perpetual Dormancy"	4:41
7.	"Leveling the Plane of Existence"	4:43
8.	"Manufactured Humanity"	2:58
9.	"My Own Savior"	4:18
10.	"The Sleeper Awakens"	6:37
Total length:		38:58

Deluxe Edition bonus tracks
No.	Title	Length
11.	"In Service of Time" (John Haddad Mix)	4:48
12.	"Perpetual Dormancy" (Demo)	4:32
13.	"Manufactured Humanity" (Demo)	2:54

== Personnel ==
Abysmal Dawn

- Charles Elliott – guitars, lead vocals
- Mike Cosio – bass, backing vocals
- Scott Fuller – drums

Additional musicians

- Kragen Lum – lead guitar on "Rapture Renowned" & "Leveling the Plane of Existence"
- Moyses Kolesne – lead guitar on "Pixilated Ignorance"

Production

- Jacob Speis – layout
- Pär Olofsson – cover art
- Erik Rutan – mixing, re-amping, mastering
- Scott Fuller – recording, mixing
- John Haddad – recording
- Mike Bear – recording
- Shootie HG – photography
