= Programmed to Consume =

Studio album by Abysmal Dawn
- Released: May 13, 2008
- Recorded: November 2007
- Genre: Death metal
- Length: 37:23
- Label: Relapse Records
- Producer: Abysmal Dawn, John Haddad

Abysmal Dawn chronology
From Ashes (2005)	Programmed to Consume (2008)	Leveling the Plane of Existence (2011)

Professional ratings
Review scores
Source	Rating
About.com	4/5
AllMusic	3.5/5
Blabbermouth.net	8.5/10
Metal.de	5/10
Rock Hard	7.5/10

Programmed to Consume is the second full-length album by Abysmal Dawn. It was released on May 13, 2008 in the United States. It is their first album with Relapse Records.

== Critical reception ==
The album received a score of 3 out of 6 from Norway's Scream. The reviewer joked that the album might as well "be called 'Programmed To Play Standard Death Metal'" because it sounded so "average" and was "predictable and lacking in ideas". While they praised the musicianship and production, they stated "the band showcases zero intent to create an identity". AllMusic wrote: "If you were to make a 'death metal checklist,' all of the genre's prerequisites are met on [...] Programmed to Consume." About.com said the band expanded and perfected their sound on the record, using elements from thrash and black metal. Blabbermouth.net wrote: "[...] what impresses me most about 'Programmed to Consume' is how expertly the band balances tunefulness with merciless force." Ox-Fanzine called the album a disappointment that doesn't contain any weaknesses but not any highlights either.

== Track listing ==
All lyrics are written by Charles Elliott; all music is composed by Abysmal Dawn, except where noted.

No.	Title	Length
1.	"Programmed to Consume"	4:21
2.	"Compulsory Resurrection"	4:10
3.	"Twilight's Fallen"	5:29
4.	"Grotesque Modern Art"	3:10
5.	"A Remission of Life"	3:46
6.	"The Descent"	4:17
7.	"Aeon Aomegas" (instrumental; written by Jaime Boulanger)	1:42
8.	"Cease to Comprehend"	4:48
9.	"Walk the Path of Fire"	5:41

== Personnel ==
- Charles Elliott - guitars, vocals
- Jaime Boulanger - guitars
- Terry Barajas - drums
- Michael Cosio - bass
- Mick Mullin - mastering
