= From Ashes =

Studio album by Abysmal Dawn
- Released: April 4, 2006
- Genre: Death metal
- Length: 32:43
- Label: Crash Inc.

Abysmal Dawn chronology
From Ashes (2006)	Programmed to Consume (2007)

Professional ratings
Review scores
Source	Rating
Blabbermouth.net	8/10
Ox-Fanzine	3.5/5

From Ashes is the first full-length album by Abysmal Dawn. It was released on April 4, 2006 in the United States. The reissue of the album includes the band's 2004 demo as a bonus.

== Critical reception ==
Blabbermouth.net summarized: ""From Ashes" does not push boundaries, but it is worthy of your attention because of the careful attention to arrangement detail, the ability to keep things interesting without overdoing it, and a knack for writing songs that stick with you." Metal.de reviewed the reissue and compared the sound to bands like At the Gates and Dark Tranquillity. They said the album is not a must-buy but worth a try for death metal fans. Exclaim! reviewed the reissue and noted a resemblance to Swedish death metal, highlighting "Impending Doom" and "In the Hands of Death" as "unrelenting headbangers that feature intense rhythms".

== Track listing ==
No.	Title	Length
1.	"Impending Doom"	1:35
2.	"In the Hands of Death"	3:41
3.	"Blacken the Sky"	4:03
4.	"Servants to Their Knees"	3:50
5.	"Wicked Impulse"	3:17
6.	"Solitude's Demise"	4:25
7.	"State of Mind"	4:04
8.	"Salting the Earth"	3:23
9.	"Crown Desire"	4:25

== Personnel ==
- Charles Elliott - guitars, vocals
- Jaime Boulanger - guitars
- Terry Barajas - drums
- Mike Bear - bass
