= Switchblade Serenades =

Studio album by Sister Sin
- Released: 2008
- Recorded: 2008
- Genre: Heavy metal, hard rock
- Length: 44:26
- Label: Victory
- Producer: Tobias Lindell

Sister Sin chronology
Smash The Silence EP (2007)	Switchblade Serenades (2008)	True Sound of the Underground (2010)

Switchblade Serenades is the second studio album by Swedish heavy metal band Sister Sin. The album was released through Victory Records in 2008.

== Reception ==
AllMusic writer Eric Schneider states, "Drawing inspiration from early Motley Crue and W.A.S.P., the Gothenburg-based ensemble specializes in unabashedly retro-minded metal with vocalist Liv coming across as a female version of Vince Neil, particularly on the scrappy "Make My Day.""

== Track listing ==
All tracks are written by C. Bednarz, except where noted

No.	Title	Length
1.	"Beat The Street"	3:57
2.	"Death Will Greet Us"	3:29
3.	"One Out Of Ten"	4:01
4.	"Breaking New Ground"	3:22
5.	"On Parole"	3:51
6.	"Make My Day (Motörhead Cover)" (I. Kilmister)	3:41
7.	"Hostile Violent"	3:59
8.	"Switchblade Serenade"	4:39
9.	"Love/Hate"	3:25
10.	"All Systems Go!"	3:39
11.	"Eye To Eye"	6:32
Total length:		44:26

== Personnel ==
- Liv Jagrell – vocals
- Jimmy Hiltula – guitar, backing vocals
- Chris – bass
- Dave Sundberg – drums
