= A Haunting Curse =

Studio album by Goatwhore
- Released: September 5, 2006
- Recorded: Mana Studios in St. Petersburg, Florida
- Genre: Blackened death metal
- Length: 39:15
- Label: Metal Blade
- Producer: Erik Rutan

Goatwhore chronology
Funeral Dirge for the Rotting Sun (2003)	A Haunting Curse (2006)	Carving Out the Eyes of God (2009)

Professional ratings
Review scores
Source	Rating
About.com	4/5 stars
AllMusic	3.5/5 stars
Chronicles of Chaos	10/10 stars

A Haunting Curse is the third studio album by American extreme metal band Goatwhore.

A live performance music video was filmed for the song "Forever Consumed Oblivion", which has seen airplay on MTV2's Headbangers Ball. Another music video was filmed for "Alchemy of the Black Sun Cult".

== Track listing ==
No.	Title	Length
1.	"Wear These Scars of Testimony"	3:55
2.	"Bloodletting upon the Cloven Hoof"	3:28
3.	"Alchemy of the Black Sun Cult"	3:29
4.	"My Eyes Are the Spears of Chaos"	2:37
5.	"In the Narrow Confines of Defilement"	4:52
6.	"Forever Consumed Oblivion"	3:45
7.	"A Haunting Curse..."	4:25
8.	"Silence Marked by the Breaking of Bone"	4:05
9.	"Diabolical Submergence of Rebirth"	3:21
10.	"...of Ashen Slumber"	0:56
11.	"I Avenge Myself"	4:16

Japanese Edition bonus tracks
No.	Title	Length
12.	"Under a Funeral Moon (Darkthrone cover)"

== Personnel ==
- Ben Falgoust – lead vocals
- Sammy Duet – guitars, backing vocals
- Nathan Bergeron – bass, backing vocals
- Zack Simmons – drums
