= The Campaign (Affiance album) =

Studio album by Affiance
- Released: November 13, 2012
- Genre: Metalcore
- Label: Bullet Tooth Records

Affiance chronology
No Secrets Revealed (2010)	The Campaign (2012)	Blackout (2014)

Singles from The Campaign
- 1. "You Will Be Replaced" Released: June 19, 2012; 2. "Bohemian" Released: 2012

The Campaign is the second full-length album by American metal band Affiance. The album was relatively well received. Vocalist Dennis Tvrdik stated, "The vast majority of people like it. It rubbed some people the wrong way and to be honest, I’m glad it did. I don’t expect every person to agree with us or be our fan. There are a lot of people out there I don’t want at our shows because they are a part of the problem with the music scene. We want to be part of the solution." Videos were made on Kings of Deceit, The Cynic and We The Machines.

== Track listing ==
No.	Title	Length
1.	"Kings of Deceit (featuring Dustin Davidson of August Burns Red)"	4:09
2.	"You Will Be Replaced"	4:09
3.	"We the Machines"	3:25
4.	"Bohemian (featuring Matty Mullins of Memphis May Fire)"	4:00
5.	"Peace of Mind"	3:59
6.	"Class Dismissed"	3:34
7.	"Jericho"	3:22
8.	"The Cynic"	3:39
9.	"The Campaign"	3:48
10.	"Righteous Kill (featuring Ricky Armellino of This or the Apocalypse and Century)"	4:30
11.	"Threshold"	8:35
Total length:		47:10

== Personnel ==
Affiance

- Patrick Galante − drums
- Dominic Dickinson − lead guitar
- Brett Wondrak − rhythm guitar
- Cameron Keeter − bass guitar
- Dennis Tvrdik − vocals

Production

- Produced and mixed by Carson Slovak and Grant McFarland
- Engineered by Carson Slovak and Grant McFarland
- Recorded at Atrium Audio
- Mastered by Carson Slovak
- Art direction and design by Travis Roberts
- Band photography by John Stanchina
