= Phylogenesis (album) =

Studio album by Abysmal Dawn
- Released: April 17, 2020
- Genre: Death metal
- Length: 43:08
- Label: Season of Mist
- Producer: Mike Bear

Abysmal Dawn chronology
Obsolescence (2014)	Phylogenesis (2020)

Phylogenesis is the fifth album by American death metal band Abysmal Dawn. It was released on April 17, 2020 by Season of Mist. Being released six years after Obsolescence, Abysmal Dawn added new members while working on Phylogenesis.

== Critical reception ==
The album received very good reviews such as a 4.5/5 score from Toilet ov Hell and 8/10 from Blabbermouth, Distorted Sound Magazine and Rock Hard. Slightly below are found 7/10 reviews by outlets such as Metal.de and Exclaim!.

Mediocre to bad reviews include a 3/5 score from Angry Metal Guy and 3/7 from Metal Hammer Germany.

== Track listing ==
No.	Title	Length
1.	"Mundane Existence"	3:56
2.	"The Path of the Totalitarian"	4:17
3.	"Hedonistic"	4:20
4.	"A Speck in the Fabric of Eternity"	4:46
5.	"Coerced Evolution"	5:28
6.	"True to the Blind"	3:46
7.	"Soul‐Sick Nation"	5:52
8.	"The Lament Configuration"	6:18
9.	"Flattening of Emotions" (Death cover)	4:25
Total length:		43:08

== Personnel ==
Abysmal Dawn

- Charles Elliott – guitars, vocals
- Vito Petroni – guitars
- James Coppolino – drums
- Eliseo Garcia – bass
