= No Secrets Revealed =

No Secret Revealed

Studio album by Affiance
- Released: December 2, 2010
- Genre: Metalcore
- Label: Bullet Tooth Records

Affiance chronology
No Secret Revealed (2010)	The Campaign (2012)

Singles from No Secret Revealed
- 1. "Call to the Warrior" Released: 2010; 2. "Nostra Culpa" Released: 2011

No Secret Revealed is the debut full-length album by American metal band Affiance.

== Track listing ==
No.	Title	Length
1.	"Mad As Hell"	1:36
2.	"Call to the Warrior"	4:27
3.	"Nostra Culpa"	3:22
4.	"For Power"	3:49
5.	"A Monster Fed"	3:51
6.	"The Hive"	4:14
7.	"A Reading from the Book Of"	4:38
8.	"Der Führer"	4:35
9.	"Dissent!"	3:57
10.	"Calculate and Control"	5:00
Total length:		39:29

== Personnel ==
Affiance

- Patrick Galante − drums
- Dominic Dickinson − lead guitar
- Brett Wondrak − rhythm guitar
- Cameron Keeter − bass guitar
- Dennis Tvrdik − vocals
