= Now and Forever (Sister Sin album) =

Now And Forever

Studio album by Sister Sin
- Released: 23 October 2012
- Genre: Heavy metal, hard rock
- Length: 39:47
- Label: Victory

Sister Sin chronology
| True Sound of the Underground (2010) | Now And Forever (2012) | Black Lotus (2014) |

Professional ratings
Review scores
| Source | Rating |
|---|---|
| About.com | 3/5 stars |
| AllMusic | 3.5/5 stars |
| Loudwire | 4/5 stars |
| MetalSucks | 2/5 stars |

Now And Forever is the fourth studio album by Swedish heavy metal band Sister Sin. The album was mixed by Cameron Webb and released through Victory Records on 23 October 2012.

== Track listing ==
All tracks are written by Jimmy Hiltula and Dave Sundberg, except where noted

| No. | Title | Music | Length |
|---|---|---|---|
| 1. | "MMXII" | | 1:01 |
| 2. | "End of the Line" | | 3:57 |
| 3. | "Fight Song" | https://www.youtube.com/watch?v=tP7vRAr79N0 | 4:01 |
| 4. | "In It for Life" | | 3:49 |
| 5. | "Hearts of Cold" | | 4:13 |
| 6. | "The Chosen Few?" | | 4:08 |
| 7. | "Hang 'Em High" (Hiltula, Sundberg, Strandh) | | 3:23 |
| 8. | "I'm Not You" | | 4:01 |
| 9. | "Running Low" | | 3:55 |
| 10. | "Shades of Black" | | 3:32 |
| 11. | "Morning After" | | 3:47 |
| Total length: | | | 39:47 |

== Personnel ==
- Sister Sin
  - Liv Jagrell – Vocals
  - Jimmy Hiltula – Guitar, Backing Vocals
  - Strandh – Bass, Backing Vocals
  - Dave Sundberg – Drums
- Additional personnel
  - Sara "Biggan" Biglert – Vocal Co-Production
  - Browntone Orchestra – Strings
  - Keno Holm – Assistant Engineer
  - Urban Nasvall – Drum Tech
