= Dance of the Wicked =

Dance Of The Wicked

Studio album by Sister Sin
- Released: 1 September 2003, 2013
- Recorded: 2003
- Genre: Heavy metal, hard rock
- Length: 28:48
- Label: Sleaszy Rider Records; EMI Greece Distribution
- Producer: Jan Jan, Sister Sin

Sister Sin chronology
Dance Of The Wicked (2003)	Smash the Silence EP (2007)

Professional ratings
Review scores
Source	Rating
Metal Invader	2.5/5 stars

Dance of the Wicked is heavy metal band Sister Sin's first studio album, released 2003. Recorded and produced in 2003 by Jan Jan at Triton Studios Gothenburg. Released and Distributed by Sleaszy Rider Records & EMI Greece Distribution.

== Track listing ==
No.	Title	Length
1.	"Kiss the Sky"	4:13
2.	"Dance of the Wicked"	3:11
3.	"Fall into My Dreams"	4:20
4.	"End of the Beginning"	1:13
5.	"Love Lies"	4:13
6.	"Dirty Damn"	3:20
7.	"Paint It, Black" (The Rolling Stones cover)	3:18
8.	"Tragedy Loves Company"	4:42
Total length:		28:30

CD reissue bonus tracks (Victory Records 2013 reissue)
No.	Title	Length
9.	"Minor You (Major Me) (Demo)"	3:41
10.	"Writings on the Wall (Demo)"	3:33
11.	"Head Over Heels for Love (Demo)"	3:31
12.	"Rock 'n' Roll (Motörhead Cover) (Ft. Doro)"	3:35
Total length:		42:50

== Band members ==
- Liv Jagrell — vocals (Hysterica)
- Jimmy Hiltula — guitar (Maleficio, Archangel)
- Strandh — bass
- Dave Sundberg — drums

=== Line-up "Dance of the Wicked" ===
- Liv Jagrell — vocals (Hysterica)
- Johnny — guitar (Revolution Riot)
- Chris — bass
- Dave Sundberg — drums
