= True Sound of the Underground =

Studio album by Sister Sin
- Released: 13 May 2010
- Genres: Heavy metal, hard rock
- Length: 39:02
- Label: Victory

Sister Sin chronology
Switchblade Serenades (2008)	True Sound of the Underground (2010)	Now and Forever (2012)

True Sound of the Underground is the third studio album by Swedish heavy metal band Sister Sin, released through Victory Records on 13 May 2010.

== Track listing ==
All tracks are written by Sister Sin – Except: 24/7 written by Udo Dirkschneider & Stefan Kaufmann (U.D.O. cover).

No.	Title	Length
1.	"Sound of the Underground"	3:35
2.	"Outrage"	3:28
3.	"Better Than Them"	3:34
4.	"24/7"	3:59
5.	"Heading For Hell"	3:42
6.	"I Stand Alone"	4:11
7.	"Built To Last"	3:27
8.	"The Devil I Know"	3:28
9.	"Times Aren't A-Changing"	2:57
10.	"Nailbiter"	3:35
11.	"Beat 'Em Down"	3:32
Total length:		39:02

== Personnel ==
- Liv Jagrell – Vocals
- Jimmy Hiltula – Guitar
- Strandh – Bass
- Dave Sundberg – Drums
