= Waves Are Dancing =

Studio album by Holy Blood
- Released: July 5, 2005
- Genres: Unblack metal, folk metal
- Length: 41:28
- Labels: MUSICA Production, Bombworks Records
- Producer: Rob Cowall

Holy Blood chronology
The Wanderer (2002)	Waves Are Dancing (2005)	The Patriot (2008)

Waves Are Dancing is the second studio album by Ukrainian folk metal band Holy Blood, released in 2005. The band's and their label's best selling album, Waves saw the band moving even further towards the highly melodic folk metal style while still keeping the black metal elements, particularly the thin and high-pitched shrieking vocals. In 2010, HM Magazine ranked it #88 on the Top 100 Christian metal albums of all-time list.

== Overview ==
The musical output is dominated by recorder melodies and keyboards, and occasionally there are ethereal female vocals and folk choir singing. Waves opens with the sound of ocean waves followed by acoustic guitars, keys, and finally joined by a flute. The first song after the intro, "To Heaven" emphasizes on fast riffing, blast beats, shrieking vocals, and group vocals. "The Spring" opens with the sound of insects and a flute, only to have the brutal guitars, double bass, and aggressive vocals shatter the calmness. "Jerusalem" includes some choir-type vocals, some growled vocals, and chanted male vocals to go along with the black vocals of earlier songs. "I Flow Toward the Fate" starts in an intense manner, and a little bit into the song have been incorporated some subtle female vocals. "In the Last Battle" incorporates subtle female vocals as well. "In the Last Battle" also integrates dueling chanting, black vocals and male choir vocals to complement the female vocals. This track has some peculiar guitar work and also has a virtuoso guitar solo.

A music video was shot for "The Spring," and the video was included for the album as a bonus multimedia disc.

== Reception ==
The album was commercially successful and critically acclaimed. In a 2005 interview, the band's label Bombworks Records' owner claimed that Waves are Dancing is the label's best selling release. Especially the title track was praised for its stylish and epic output. Certain critics considered the band to be on the same level of quality as some of the leading groups in the folk metal genre. However, the vocals of Fedor Buzilevich received most of the criticism: one critic wrote that the vocals, "although personal, are also intolerable", and claimed that the album would have been more enjoyable without the thin shrieking. Matt Morrow of The Whipping Post wrote that "Holy Blood gave us a great first impression with The Wanderer, but my opinion is that Waves are Dancing is a much more solid album with better quality songs and a more mature sound."

== Track listing ==
All music by Holy Blood.

No.	Title	Length
1.	"Intro" (Instrumental)	2:39
2.	"To Heaven"	3:44
3.	"The Spring"	5:33
4.	"Jerusalem"	5:55
5.	"I Flow Towards the Fate"	4:20
6.	"Baptising of the Rus'" (Instrumental)	2:33
7.	"In the Last Battle"	4:53
8.	"The Fair"	4:17
9.	"Waves Are Dancing"	5:09
10.	"Outro" (Instrumental)	2:25
Total length:		41:28

== Personnel ==
- Fedor Buzilevich – lead vocals, flute
- Sergiy Nagorniy – lead guitar
- Artem Stupak – rhythm guitar
- Eugeniy Tsesaryov – bass
- Dmitry Titorenko – drums
- Vera Knyazyova – keyboards, vocals
