= The Eclipse of Ages into Black =

Studio album by Goatwhore
- Released: February 22, 2000
- Recorded: Noiselab
- Genre: Blackened death metal
- Length: 45:47
- Label: Rotten
- Producer: Keith Falgout

Goatwhore chronology
Serenades to the Tide of Blood	The Eclipse of Ages into Black (2000)	Funeral Dirge for the Rotting Sun (2003)

Professional ratings
Review scores
Source	Rating
AllMusic	2.5/5 stars

The Eclipse of Ages into Black is the debut full-length studio album by American extreme metal band Goatwhore. It was released on February 22, 2000.

== Track listing ==
No.	Title	Length
1.	"Nocturnal Holocaust"	1:40
2.	"Lair of Nastrond"	2:35
3.	"Desolate Path to Apocalyptic Ruin"	3:37
4.	"The Beauty in Suffering"	3:32
5.	"As the Reflection Slowly Fades"	4:01
6.	"All the Sins"	2:01
7.	"Satan's Millennium"	2:18
8.	"Upon This Deathbed of Cold Fire"	4:49
9.	"Gravedom"	3:26
10.	"Invert the Virgin"	2:51
11.	"Perversions of the Ancient Goat"	1:25
12.	"Into a Darker Sun"	3:20
13.	"Under a Dark God"	2:48
14.	"Commanding the Legions of Hell"	2:55
15.	"Graveyards and Dead Angels"	4:29

== Credits ==
- Ben Falgoust – vocals
- Sammy Duet – guitars
- Ben Stout – guitars
- Pat Bruders – bass
- Zak Nolan – drums
