= Abysmal Dawn =

American death metal band

- Origin: Los Angeles, California, U.S.
- Genre: Death metal
- Years active: 2003–present
- Labels: Crash Music; Relapse; Season of Mist
- Members: Charles Elliott; Eliseo Garcia; James Coppolino; Vito Petroni
- Past members: Terry Barajas; Jamie Boulanger; Mike Bear; Carlos Arriola; Mike Cosio; Ian Jekelis; Scott Fuller
- Website: abysmaldawn.com

Abysmal Dawn is an American death metal band from Los Angeles, California. The band has released five studio albums since its inception in 2003. Abysmal Dawn has had numerous lineup changes. Guitarist and vocalist Charles Elliott remains the sole constant member.

== History ==
Charles Elliott (guitars/vocals), Jamie Boulanger (guitars), and Terry Barajas (drums) formed Abysmal Dawn. They circulated a three-song demo in winter 2004. The demo draw the attention of the underground metal press and helped them book shows with Exodus, 3 Inches of Blood, Hate Eternal, Into Eternity, and Aborted. In November 2005, the band began work on their first full-length, From Ashes, with engineer John Haddad (Intronaut, Eyes of Fire, Phobia). They went on a five-week U.S. tour with Six Feet Under and Decapitated, additionally playing as support throughout their home state with Suffocation, Emperor, Immortal, Goatwhore, and Decrepit Birth.

In 2007, Abysmal Dawn played a handful of festivals (LA Murderfest, Gathering of the Sick, Burning Star Metal Fest, and more), but the band devoted most of their time to writing and rehearsing new material for their follow-up to From Ashes. By November, Abysmal Dawn had entered Haddad's new studio to begin the next full-length. Abysmal Dawn spent the next three months in and out of the studio recording Programmed to Consume. In February 2008, Abysmal Dawn signed a deal with Relapse Records, making Programmed to Consume the band's label debut, released on May 13 (May 19 internationally).

Three years after the release of Leveling the Plane of Existence, they released their fourth studio album, Obsolescence, on October 28, 2014, via Relapse Records. According to Elliott, the title of the album was "inspired by the term 'planned obsolescence', and is applied to all of mankind." The Village Voice rated the album number one and called it "The closest thing to a perfect metal album that you will hear this year."

Abysmal Dawn supported Incantation and Marduk on tour in the US in the summer of 2017.

Abysmal Dawn released their fifth studio album, Phylogenesis, through Season of Mist Records on April 17, 2020.

== Band members ==
Current

- Charles Elliott – guitars, lead vocals (2003–present)
- Eliseo Garcia – bass, backing vocals (2011–present)
- James Coppolino – drums (2016–present)
- Vito Petroni – guitars (2017–present)

Former

- Jamie Boulanger – guitars (2003–2008)
- Terry Barajas – drums (2003–2009)
- Carlos Arriola – bass (2006–2007)
- Ian Jekelis – guitars (2008–2010)
- Mike Cosio – bass (2007–2011)
- Andy Nelson – guitars (2008–2015)
- Scott Fuller – drums (2010–2015)
- Allan Marcus – guitars (2016)

== Discography ==
=== Studio albums ===
Year	Album details
2006	From Ashes: Label: Crash Music, Inc.; Released: April 4, 2006
2008	Programmed to Consume: Label: Relapse Records; Released: May 13, 2008
2011	Leveling the Plane of Existence: Label: Relapse Records; Released: February 1, 2011
2014	Obsolescence: Label: Relapse Records; Released: October 24, 2014
2020	Phylogenesis: Label: Season of Mist; Released: April 17, 2020

=== EPs ===
Year	Album details
2022	Nightmare Frontier: Label: Season of Mist; Released: February 4, 2022

=== Demos ===
- Demo (2004)

=== Music videos ===
- "Programmed to Consume" (2008)
- "My Own Savior" (2011)
- "In Service of Time" (2013)
- "Inanimate" (2014)
