= Obsolescence (album) =

Studio album by Abysmal Dawn
- Released: October 24, 2014
- Recorded: Artisan Road Studios
- Genre: Death metal
- Length: 48:00
- Label: Relapse
- Producer: Mike Bear

Abysmal Dawn chronology
Leveling the Plane of Existence (2011)	Obsolescence (2014)	Phylogenesis (2020)

Professional ratings
Review scores
Source	Rating
Bravewords	8/10 stars
Metal Storm	7.4/10
Popmatters	7/10
Revolver	3/5

Obsolescence is the fourth album by American death metal band Abysmal Dawn. It was released on October 24, 2014 by Relapse Records. A music video was made for "Inanimate".

== Track listing ==
No.	Title	Length
1.	"Human Obsolescence"	4:30
2.	"Perfecting Slavery"	4:46
3.	"Inanimate"	4:15
4.	"Devouring the Essence of God"	3:19
5.	"One Percent Incomplete"	3:34
6.	"Loathed in Life / Praised in Death"	4:51
7.	"By My Demons"	4:09
8.	"Laborem Morte Liberat Te"	5:21
9.	"The Inevitable Return to Darkness"	6:11
10.	"Night's Blood" (Dissection cover)	7:04
Total length:		48:00

== Personnel ==
Abysmal Dawn

- Charles Elliott – guitars, vocals
- Andy Nelson – guitars
- Scott Fuller – drums
- Eliseo Garcia – bass

Additional musicians

- Christian Münzner – guitar on "Perfecting Slavery"
- Bobby Koelble – guitar on "Devouring the Essence of God"

Production

- Pär Olofsson – cover art
- Mike Bear – producer
- John Haddad – mixing, mastering
