= Northern Oak =

UK musical group

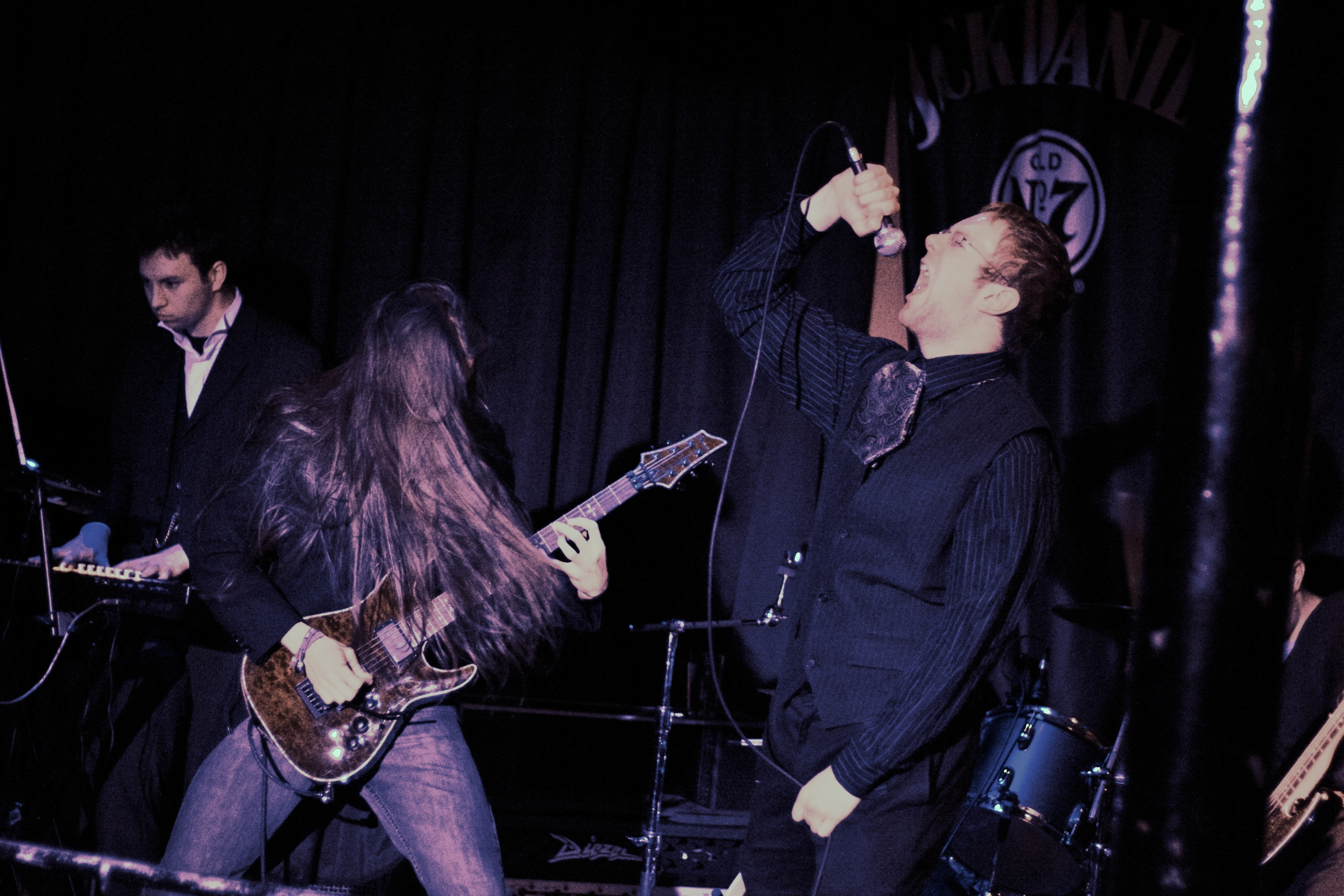
- Northern Oak @ West Street Live, Sheffield (1 February 2011)

Background information
- Origin: Sheffield, England
- Genres: Folk metal Progressive metal Black metal
- Years active: 2006–2016
- Labels: Unsigned artist
- Members: Martin Collins; Chris Mole; Catie Williams; Digby Brown; Richard Allan; Paul Whibberley

Northern Oak was a folk metal band from Sheffield, England. The band formed in 2006 and their debut album, Tales From Rivelin came out in 2008. The band then released two live studio EPs entitled Into The Attic, 28 July 2009 and Northern Oak, before releasing their second full-length album Monuments in December 2010, to acclaim from a number of underground music publications such as Metal Hammer Magazine, Zero Tolerance Magazine, and Terrorizer. They disbanded in 2016.

Northern Oak used traditional instruments alongside a modern heavy metal instrument setup (electric guitar, bass guitar, drums), with flautist Catie Williams utilising the flute, the alto flute and the recorder in various songs. They also used a keyboard to synthesize other traditional instruments such as harpsichord, church organ, bagpipes and the triangle. The band's name came from their location (in Northern England) and the English oak tree, which was symbolic of their appreciation for nature and the English countryside.

== History ==
The band was founded late in 2006 by Chris Mole, original keyboardist Elliot Sinclair, original vocalist James Harris and founding drummer Daniel Loughran. Over several months of practicing and development, the band began to assemble a setlist and swiftly produced their first demo, entitled Rivelin.

The band performed their first gig in 2007. Shortly afterwards the band was joined by another new member – flautist Catie Williams. At this point the band began to explore a much more folk-heavy sound, due to Williams' experience of and participation in the English folk music scene.

Soon afterwards, recording began on what would become the band's debut album, Tales From Rivelin. During this period the band played their second show at Under the Boardwalk, this time bidding farewell to Loughran, who left the band due to leaving Sheffield. As the band worked on getting the album finished and printed, some other line-up shifts occurred – a new drummer (Jesse Harrison) and bassist (Kimberley Sears) joined the band, as did a new vocalist (Carl Aspinall). Aspinall's tenure was short-lived due to his other commitments, however, and he was soon replaced by a long-time friend of the band, Martin Collins.

Tales From Rivelin was released in March 2008 and garnered some positive press, including two positive reviews from Terrorizer magazine and Zero Tolerance magazine. One of the tracks from the album, 'Madness of the Feral Moon', also appeared on Iron Age Records' Volume 1 compilation alongside bands such as Shieldwall, Oakenshield and No Remorse. Having played a number of shows to promote the album and spread their name and reputation, Northern Oak began working on new material for the next recorded work and to increase their repertoire of songs. They began to perform live much more frequently, playing six gigs in 2008 compared with two in 2007, including a slot at the 2008 Gathering of the Clans festival where they were introduced by Martin Walkyier of Sabbat and The Clan Destined fame.

In March 2009, progress on new material was slowed by the departure of drummer Jesse Harrison and bassist Kimberley Sears. The band recruited another longtime friend, bassist Richard Allan, and a new drummer in the form of Paul Whibberley, conga player in the salsa band Cuatro de Diciembre with Williams. Work continued on material for a follow-up to Tales From Rivelin, and in a short time the band’s setlist had expanded considerably. The first live practice EP, Into The Attic, 28 July 2009 was released to give the band's fans a taster of the new material, and soon afterwards, discussions with Aled Pashley of the Welsh band Annwn led to Northern Oak signing to independent label Mynydd Du records. A second live practice EP, Northern Oak, was recorded in August 2009 and provided another lo-fi preview of the band's new songs.

2009 also saw the band playing more shows across the country, performing at Highland Fire Festival in Edinburgh and Gathering of the Clans 2009 in Leicestershire, as well as a large number of shows in Sheffield.

In 2010, the band began recording their second full-length album, Monuments. Recruiting Travis Smith to create some cover artwork for the album, Northern Oak began recording at the Sheffield University Soundhouse in May and concluded in October that year. On 11 December 2010, the band released the album at a masquerade-themed launch show at Sheffield Corporation, with support from their friends in Old Corpse Road and the Secrets of the Boudoir Burlesque troupe. Following the launch gig, founding keyboardist Elliot Sinclair left the band due to a lack of time brought about by his relocation to London, and was replaced by new keyboardist, Digby Brown.

On 7 June 2011, Northern Oak were one of the first bands announced for the New Blood Stage at Bloodstock Open Air Festival 2011. Their gig on 13 August 2011 at the Jägermeister stage at Bloodstock was the band's first acoustic set.

In addition to their Bloodstock appearance, Northern Oak gigged extensively across England in 2011 in support of Monuments, including a mini tour (called The Great Exhibition) in the UK with Old Corpse Road, The Prophecy and Eibon la Furies in November.

== Characteristics ==
Northern Oak combined English folk melodies with progressive metal guitars and black metal vocals. The band made use of traditional instruments including the flute, the alto flute and the recorder in their music, and synthesized a number of other traditional instruments using a keyboard. The folk melodies incorporated into their songs are drawn from flautist Catie William's knowledge of traditional English folk tunes – some are direct transcriptions of folk melodies (as in the songs Only Our Names Will Remain, which features the melody of the folk song The Snows They Melt the Soonest and The Scarlet Lady, which features an altered version of the melody from the folk song King of the Faeries), while others were created with that style in mind. The band's lyrics have a philosophical tone and focus on questions of mortality and existence, often through a naturalistic, historical or mythological framework. The band listed artists such as Opeth and Agalloch as sources of inspiration.

== Members ==
=== Final line-up ===
- Martin Collins – vocals, spoken word (2009–2016)
- Chris Mole – acoustic guitar, electric guitar (2006–2016)
- Catie Williams – flute, alto flute, recorder (2007–2016)
- Richard Allan – bass guitar (2009–2016)
- Digby Brown – keyboard – (2010–2016)
- Paul Whibberley – drums (2009–2016)

=== Former members ===
- Daniel Loughran – drums (2006–2008)
- Elliot Sinclair – keyboard (2006–2010)
- James Harris – vocals (2006–2008)
- Carl Aspinall – vocals (2009)
- Jesse Harrison – drums (2008–2009)
- Kimberley Sears – bass guitar (2008–2009)
- Lindsey Campbell – vocalist (2007–2008)

== Discography ==
Year	Title	Label
2008	Tales From Rivelin	Unsigned
2009	Into the Attic	Unsigned
2009	Northern Oak	Mynydd Du Records
2010	Monuments	Independent
2014	Of Roots and Flesh	Independent

=== Studio albums ===
- Tales From Rivelin (2008)
- Monuments (2010)

=== EPs ===
- Into The Attic, 28th July 2009 (2009)
- Northern Oak (2009)

=== Compilation albums ===
- Iron Age Records: Sampler 1 (2008)

=== Videos ===
- Gawain (2010)
- Live performance of Arbor Low (2010)
