= Blood for the Master =

Studio album by Goatwhore
- Released: February 13, 2012
- Recorded: Mana Recording Studios
- Genre: Blackened death metal
- Length: 38:11
- Label: Metal Blade
- Producer: Erik Rutan

Goatwhore chronology
Carving Out the Eyes of God (2009)	Blood for the Master (2012)	Constricting Rage of the Merciless (2014)

Professional ratings
Aggregate scores
Source	Rating
Metacritic	61/100
Review scores
Source	Rating
About.com	4/5 stars
AllMusic	4/5 stars
Blabbermouth.net	8/10
Blistering.com	9/10
Chronicles of Chaos	8/10 stars
Decibel	8/10 stars
Pitchfork	4.8/10
Popmatters	5/10

Blood for the Master is the fifth studio album by American blackened death metal band Goatwhore.

== Track listing ==
No.	Title	Length
1.	"Collapse in Eternal Worth"	3:40
2.	"When Steel and Bone Meet"	3:12
3.	"Parasitic Scriptures of the Sacred Word"	3:28
4.	"In Deathless Tradition"	4:26
5.	"Judgement of the Bleeding Crown"	3:58
6.	"Embodiment of This Bitter Chaos"	4:44
7.	"Beyond the Spell of Discontent"	4:02
8.	"Death to the Architects of Heaven"	3:41
9.	"An End to Nothing"	2:49
10.	"My Name Is Frightful Among the Believers"	4:11
Total length:		38:11

Japanese Edition bonus tracks
No.	Title	Length
11.	"Don't Need Religion (Motörhead cover)"

== Personnel ==
Goatwhore

- Ben Falgoust – lead vocals
- Sammy Duet – guitars, backing vocals
- James Harvey – bass, backing vocals
- Zack Simmons – drums

Additional personnel

- Erik Rutan – production, guitar solo on intro to "Embodiment of This Bitter Chaos"
- Brian Elliott – additional engineering
- Robert Coldwell – additional engineering
- Jordan Barlow – artwork
