= Affiance (band) =

American metalcore band

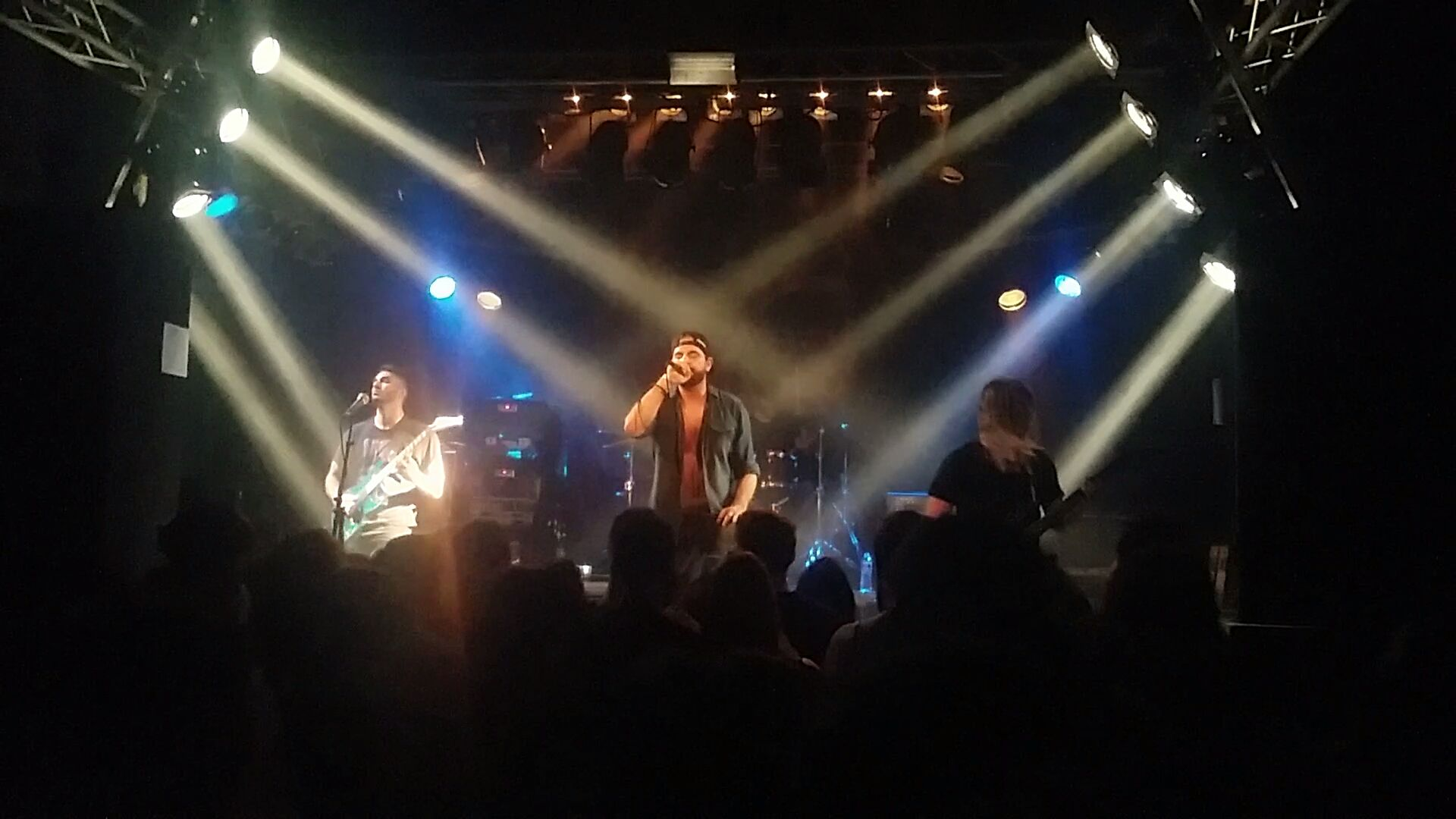
- Affiance live at the Willemeen in Arnhem, Netherlands (November 12, 2016)

Background information
- Also known as: Affiance
- Origin: Cleveland, Ohio, U.S.
- Genre: Metalcore
- Years active: 2007–2017, 2020–present
- Label: Bullet Tooth Records
- Members: Dennis Tvrdik; Brett Wondrak; Dominic Dickinson; Patrick Galante
- Past members: Nick Wagner; Bradley Newshutz; Cameron Keeter; Michael Roslaniec; Brian Akers; Eric Thomas
- Website: Night Rider on Facebook

Affiance is an American metalcore band from Cleveland, Ohio, formed in 2007. They released one EP prior to their debut album No Secrets Revealed, which was released on Bullet Tooth Records in December 2010. Vocalist Dennis Tvrdik sings of political and religious issues.

== History ==
=== Formation and Calm Before the Storm EP (2007–2009) ===
Affiance formed and released their first 6-track EP entitled Calm Before the Storm in late 2007.

After minimal success with the EP, the band signed a deal with Bullet Tooth records to begin production of their debut album.

=== Signing to Bullet Tooth Records and No Secrets Revealed (2010) ===
With their first EP released, the band began their first nationwide tour with Across The Sun and No Bragging Rights.

During this tour, Josh Grabelle, the president of Bullet Tooth Records, saw the band play in New Jersey and said, "These guys were one of the best live bands I had ever seen. I truly needed to see them play live to make sure Dennis' vocals weren't studio magic, and they certainly weren't! I was blown away. The whole band was incredible." Grabelle signed the band.

In the fall of 2010, the band entered the studio and began their preparations for the release of their first full-length album, No Secrets Revealed, which was released on December 2, 2010.

In 2011, Affiance's single "Call to the Warrior" was released as a downloadable track on the popular game Rock Band. The band's music video for the song is of them playing their own track on Rock Band.

=== The Campaign and touring (2012–2013) ===
On September 6, 2012, Affiance posted on their Facebook page that they had finished recording and would be embarking on a fall tour with bands Modern Day Escape and Deception of a Ghost. On September 27, 2012, they released their cover of Europe's "The Final Countdown."

The next album, The Campaign, was released November 13, 2012. It features guest vocals from August Burns Red's bassist Dustin Davidson, Memphis May Fire's Matty Mullins and Century's Ricky Armellino.

The band toured through February and March 2013 with supporting act Glamour of the Kill. The band even went on their first European tour opening up for Dance Gavin Dance with Closure in Moscow and Violet joining the lineup. Afterward, the band opened the Killswitch Engage summer headliner The Disarm The Descent Tour with Darkest Hour, Miss May I and The Word Alive. Later in the year, the band supported Protest the Hero on their tour with Architects and The Kindred joined them also.

=== Blackout, Gaia and disbandment (2014–2017) ===
Affiance released a lyric video for the song "Limitless" on June 28, 2014, from their upcoming album Blackout. On August 26, 2014, the band released another single from Blackout, titled "Monuments Fail". On September 10, 2014, the band released a music video for "Fire!".

Blackout was released on September 23, 2014. They toured to support the album in September 2014 and January 2015. The band also toured to support Miss May I in October 2014 on their Road to Knotfest tour. In 2016 Affiance released the album "Gaia" in the Spring time, they did a tour to support the album. It Lives it Breathes, XXI and Set to Stun were the support for the Gaia tour.

After the release of "Gaia", the band announced that they would soon be breaking up. A farewell tour took place in April 2017, with support from Sirens & Sailors and Convictions. They played their final show the Agora Theater in their hometown, Cleveland, on June 24, 2017. The show was supported by Nine Shrines, Hope for the Hollow, Leav/e/arth, Skies of December, Ira Hill, Koly Kolgate, Entendre, Significant Loss, and Set Sail to March.

=== Return and new band Night Rider (since 2020) ===
On October 27, 2020, Affiance released a new single titled "Star Spangled". This was only a somber rendition of the U.S. National Anthem. On October 28, 2020, just a day after this release, a cryptic post on their social media showed an updated band logo and indicated further activity on "11/06/2020". At 12:00 am on November 6, 2020, Affiance released a new single "Lost and Forgotten". On Friday December 3 they released a new song entitled "The Line".

On July 1, 2022, the band announced the existing members of Affiance formed a new band called Night Rider with the release of a new single: a cover of Running Up That Hill.

On November 3, 2023, Night Rider released a self-titled album featuring 11 tracks. Dana Willax of Kingdom of Giants and Ryan Kirby of Fit for a King both feature on the album. Following the release, Night Rider played an album release show at The Roxy in Lakewood, Ohio on December 8, 2023.

== Discography ==
=== Albums ===
- No Secrets Revealed (Bullet Tooth Records, 2010)
- The Campaign (Bullet Tooth Records, 2012)
- Blackout (Bullet Tooth Records, 2014)
- Night Rider (2023) (as Night Rider)

=== EPs ===
Calm Before The Storm (2007) was self-released and self-produced by the band.

Calm Before The Storm
No.	Title	Length
1.	"Hope"	4:45
2.	"Wake Up, Save Us"	4:00
3.	"The Gift"	2:55
4.	"Half-Empty Hearts"	3:37
5.	"This Time Is The Last"	3:54
6.	"Delusion Of Grandeur"	4:56
Total length:		24:07

Gaia (2016), Affiance's final release, was self-released and self-produced by the band.

Gaia
No.	Title	Length
1.	"Reboot"	4:05
2.	"Gaia"	4:30
3.	"Hollow Empire"	4:05
4.	"Knowing"	5:43
5.	"Crusader"	3:10
6.	"PRSVR"	4:26
7.	"Exist"	5:19
Total length:		31:18

== Music videos ==
Year	Song	Director	Album
2010	"Call to the Warrior"	John Stanchina (Forest City Studio)	No Secret Revealed
2011	"Nostra Culpa"	John Stanchina (Forest City Studio)	No Secret Revealed
2012	"Kings of Deceit"	Stephen Mlinarcik	The Campaign
2012	"The Cynic"	Stephen Mlinarcik	The Campaign
2013	"We The Machines"	Stephen Mlinarcik	The Campaign
2014	"FIRE!"	Josiah Moore	Blackout
2016	"Reboot"	Josiah Moore	Gaia

== Concert tours ==
- Gaia EP Release Tour- Affiance, XXI, It Lives it Breathes, Versus, Set to Stun
- The Chapter & Curse Tour- Ice Nine Kills, Affiance, More to Monroe, Come & Rest
- Texas Independent Fest
- Road to Riff City- Affiance, Phinehas, Kingdom of Giants
- Road to Knotfest- Miss May I & Affiance
- Blackout Release Show- Affiance & Phinehas
- Warped Tour 2014- Enter Shikari, State Champs, Real Friends, The Ghost Inside, Every Time I Die, Falling in Reverse, Born of Osiris, Parkway Drive, Chelsea Grin, Motionless in White, Stray from the Path, Beartooth, Neck Deep, Ice Nine Kills
- Summer 2014 Tour- Affiance, Black Tide, Threat Signal, Hatchet
- The Eat Your Heart Out Tour- I The Breather, Affiance, My Ticket Home, Gift Giver, Come the Dawn
- Spring 2014 Tour- Affiance, Close Your Eyes, My Enemies & I
- Fall 2013 Tour- Protest the Hero, Architects, Affiance, The Kindred
- Disarm the Descent Tour- Killswitch Engage, Miss May I, Darkest Hour, The Word Alive, Affiance
- UK 2013 Tour- Dance Gavin Dance, Closure in Moscow, Affiance, Violet
- 2013 Mini Tour- Affiance & Glamour of the Kill
- Western Warriors Tour- Affiance, Fit For A King, Kingdom of Giants
- The Warriors Tour- Affiance, Serianna, Us From Outside, Sirens & Sailors
- Empty Hands & Heavy Hearts Tour- The Color Morale, Affiance, Like Moths to Flames, Counterparts
- The Factour X Tour- Everyone Dies in Utah, Affiance, Sirens & Sailors, Deception of a Ghost
- 2012 Co-Headliner- Affiance, Modern Day Escape, Deception of a Ghost, Picture me Broken
- Lochness Monstour- No Bragging Rights, Across the Sun, Affiance
- Too Cool for School Tour- Blind Witness, Stray from the Path, Vanna, Liferuiner, Affiance
- Summer 2010 Tour- This or the Apocalypse, Affiance, Last Chance to Reason, Deception of A Ghost

== See also ==
- List of Rock Band Network songs
