= Black Lotus (Sister Sin album) =

Studio album by Sister Sin
- Released: October 27, 2014
- Genre: Heavy metal, hard rock
- Length: 39:47
- Label: Victory

Sister Sin chronology
Now and Forever (2012)	Black Lotus (2014)

Black Lotus is the fifth and final studio album by Swedish heavy metal band Sister Sin.

Produced by Rikard Lofgren and Gustav Ydenius, the album was released by Victory Records on 27 October 2014. The same day, the album in full was streamed on Blabbermouth, and the official music video for "Chaos Royale" premiered on Loudwire. Before the album's release, a lyric video for the song was available on Metal Hammer.

== Track listing ==
All tracks are written by Jimmy Hiltula and Dave Sundberg

No.	Title	Length
1.	"Food for Worms"	4:58
2.	"Chaos Royale"	3:39
3.	"Au Revoir"	3:39
4.	"Desert Queen"	5:24
5.	"Count Me Out"	4:05
6.	"Stones Throw"	3:50
7.	"The Jinx"	3:44
8.	"Ruled By None"	3:49
9.	"Sail North"	3:51
Total length:		36:59

== Personnel ==
- Sister Sin
  - Liv Jagrell – Vocals
  - Jimmy Hiltula – Guitar
  - Strandh – Bass
  - Dave Sundberg – Drums
- Additional personnel
  - Another Victory – Publishing
  - Alan Douches – Mastering
  - Cameron Webb – Mixing
  - Eddie Meduza – Voice sample track 9
  - David Sundberg – Additional Percussion
  - Gustav Ydenius – Drum Tech & String Arrangements
