= Funeral Dirge for the Rotting Sun =

Album by Goatwhore

Studio album by Goatwhore
- Released: August 26, 2003
- Recorded: Noiselab
- Genre: Blackened death metal
- Length: 37:13
- Label: Rotten
- Producer: Goatwhore

Goatwhore chronology
The Eclipse of Ages into Black (2000)	Funeral Dirge for the Rotting Sun (2003)	Goatwhore/Epoch of Unlight (2003)

Professional ratings
Review scores
Source	Rating
AllMusic	3/5 stars
Chronicles of Chaos	5.5/10 stars

Funeral Dirge for the Rotting Sun is Goatwhore's second full-length studio album. A music video was made for the song "Blood Guilt Eucharist".

== Track listing ==
No.	Title	Length
1.	"Sacrament of Emptiness and Despair"	1:45
2.	"Vengeance of Demonic Fury"	3:07
3.	"Blood Guilt Eucharist"	4:01
4.	"The Serpent That Enslaves What Is Worshiped"	3:19
5.	"Chanting Bells of Funeral Anguish"	3:23
6.	"Sky Inferno"	3:41
7.	"A Closure in Infinity"	3:44
8.	"Invocation to the Obsidian Moon"	1:38
9.	"As the Sun Turns to Ash"	3:21
10.	"Fires of the Judas Blood"	2:59
11.	"The Black Art of Deception"	2:17
12.	"Baptized in a Storm of Swords"	3:49

Japanese Edition bonus tracks
No.	Title	Length
13.	"Into the Crypt of Rays (Celtic Frost cover)"

== Personnel ==
- Ben Falgoust - vocals
- Sammy Duet - guitars
- Pat Bruders - bass
- Zak Nolan - drums
