= Sister Sin =

Swedish heavy metal band

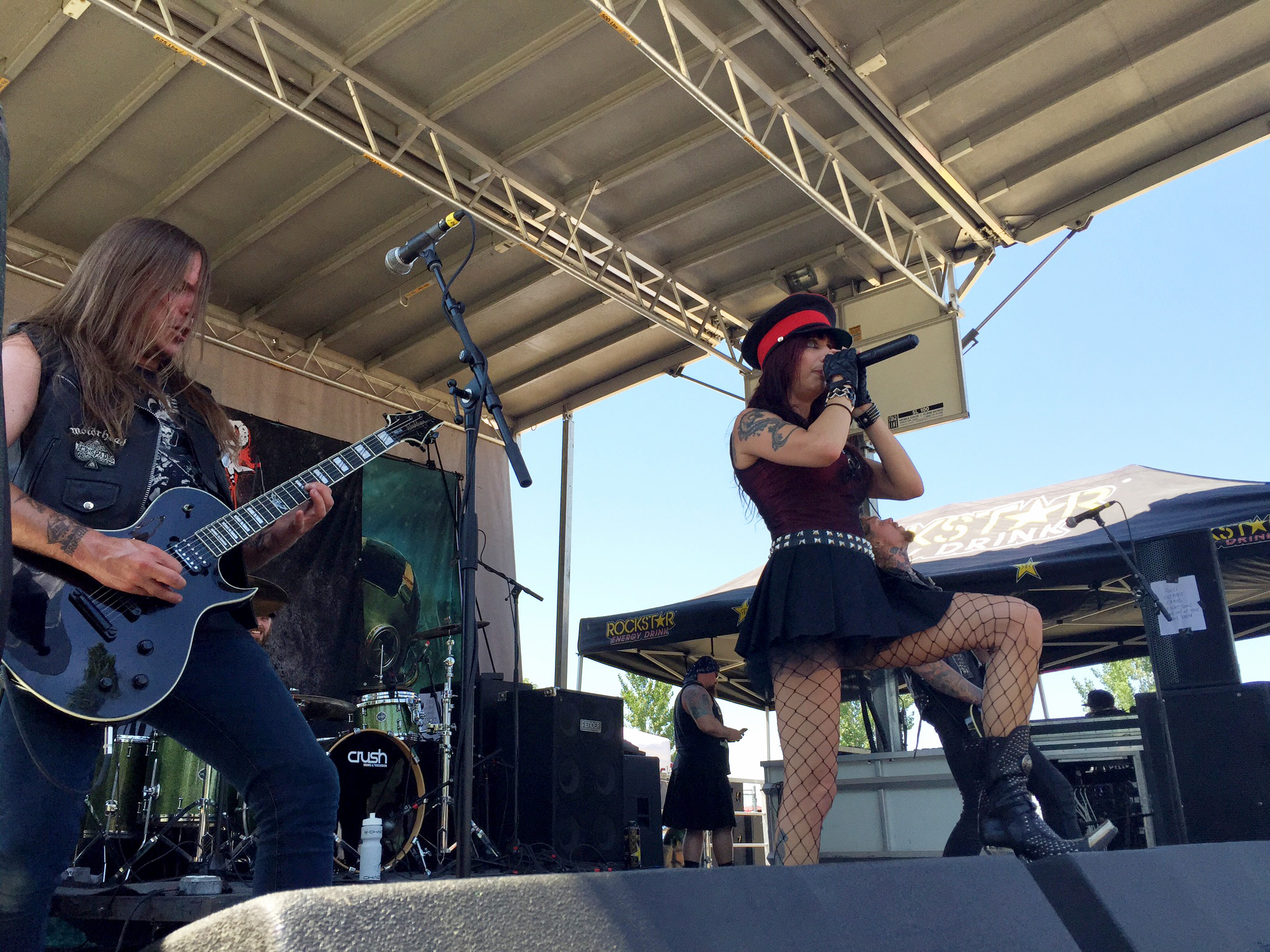
- Sister Sin at Mayhem Festival 2015

Background information
- Origin: Gothenburg, Sweden
- Genre: Heavy metal
- Years active: 2002–2015; 2019–present
- Label: Victory Records
- Members: Liv Jagrell; Jimmy Hiltula; Strandh; Dave Sundberg
- Past members: Chris; Benton Wiberg; Johnny

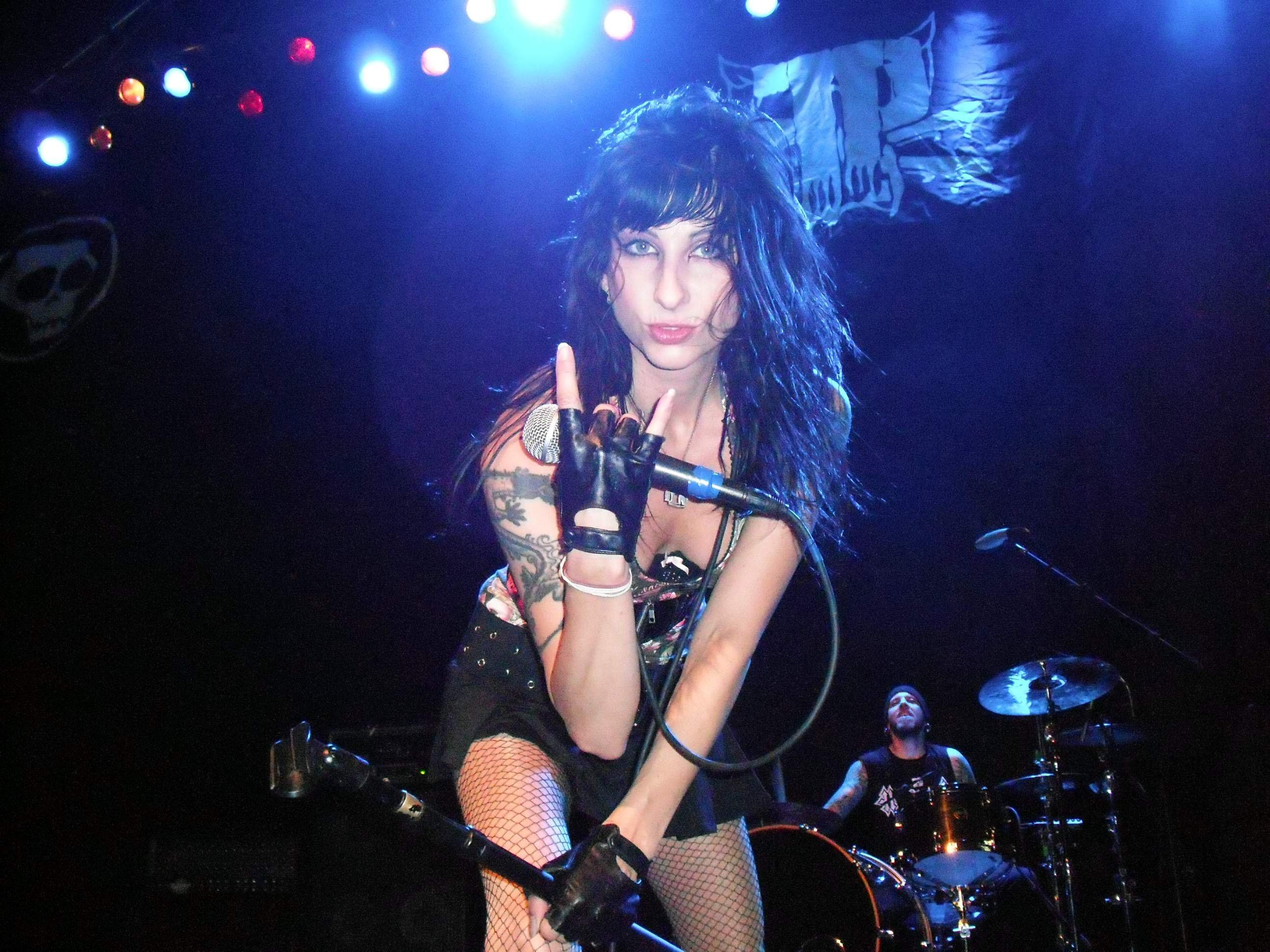
Sister Sin performing in 2009

Sister Sin is a Swedish heavy metal band from Gothenburg. The band released four full-length albums, with the most recent, Black Lotus, released in 2014. Sister Sin toured in Europe and North America with bands such as Slayer, King Diamond, Lordi and In This Moment before splitting in November 2015. The band reunited in December 2019.

== History ==
The group was formed in 2002 and released various recordings via smaller indie labels. They issued their first non-indie album Switchblade Serenades via Victory Records in October 2008; it reached number 107 on Top Heatseekers in the first week of release in the US. The band performed two US national tours in support of the album, with bands like Motörhead, Otep, and Ill Niño. Sister Sin also toured Europe with Arch Enemy and played at festivals like Sweden Rock and Norway Rock. In early 2010, they recorded a follow-up album entitled True Sound Of The Underground with producer Henrik Edenhed (of Dead by April, Lambretta etc.). which landed on number 96 at Top Heatseekers in the United States on 22 June 2010

Later that year the band parted ways with bassist Benton Wiberg, due to his inability to tour. The band recruited Strandh as a new bassist and toured Europe with Lordi. Three US tours followed, first with Michael Schenker Group, Lynch Mob (Liv Jagrell's boyfriend, known simply as Ricky (Babylon Bombs), filled in on an interim basis. The second tour was with Straight Line Stitch, System Divide and In This Moment, then with Blackguard, Destrophy and Otep.

Sister Sin again toured Europe in fall 2011 as special guest for U.D.O. supporting their single "Rock 'N Roll", featuring German metal singer Doro Pesch.

The band's fourth album Now And Forever was released 23 October 2012 via Victory Records worldwide. The album was mixed by Cameron Webb (Motörhead, Social Distortion, Danzig) and entered the Swedish Rock/Metal Charts at #6 and #36 on Top Heatseekers in the first week of release in the US. The album is their bestselling release to date and saw them trekking through North America, Russia and in Europe.

In 2014, Sister Sin began recording their fifth album, Black Lotus. On 16 September the band premiered a lyric video for the album's first radio single, "Chaos Royale", on Metal Hammer. The album was released on Victory Records 27 October 2014 along with the official music video for "Chaos Royale" which premiered on Loudwire and full album stream on Blabbermouth

Sister Sin played the entirety of the 2015 Rockstar Energy Drink Mayhem Festival, performing on the Victory Records stage.

On 7 November 2015, the band issued a statement that band had come to an end due to members' burnout after seven years of regular touring. Nonetheless, the statement also suggested that the band members may pick up the band again in the future.

On 23 December 2019, it was announced the band had reunited and would begin touring in 2020.

== Current members ==
- Liv Jagrell – vocals (2002-2015; 2019-present)
- Jimmy Hiltula – lead guitar (2005-2015; 2019-present)
- Sebastian Svedlund - rhythm guitar (2024-present)
- Andreas Strandh – bass guitar (2010-2015; 2019-present)
- Dave Sundberg – drums, percussion (2002-2015; 2019-present)

Previous members

- Benton Wiberg – bass guitar (2009-2010)
- Chris (Chriz Bednarz) – bass guitar (2002-2009)
- Johnny Sinn – lead guitar (2002-2004)

== Discography ==
Sister Sin discography
- Studio albums: 5
- Extended plays: 1
- Singles: 9
- Music videos: 11

=== Studio albums ===
- Dance of the Wicked (2003)
- Switchblade Serenades (2008)
- True Sound of the Underground (2010)
- Now and Forever (2012)
- Black Lotus (2014)

=== EPs ===
- Smash the Silence EP (2007)

=== Music videos ===
- Sister Sin – "One Out of Ten" (2008)
- Sister Sin – "On Parole" (2008)
- Sister Sin – "Sound of the Underground" (2010)
- Sister Sin – "Outrage" (2010)
- Sister Sin – "24-7" (2010)
- Sister Sin – "Rock 'n' Roll" (Motörhead cover) feat. Doro (2011)
- Sister Sin – "End of the Line" (2012)
- Sister Sin – "Fight Song" (2013)
- Sister Sin – "Hearts of Cold" (2013)
- Sister Sin – "Chaos Royale" (2014)
- Sister Sin – "Desert Queen" (2015)
