= Ravenscry =

Italian alternative metal band

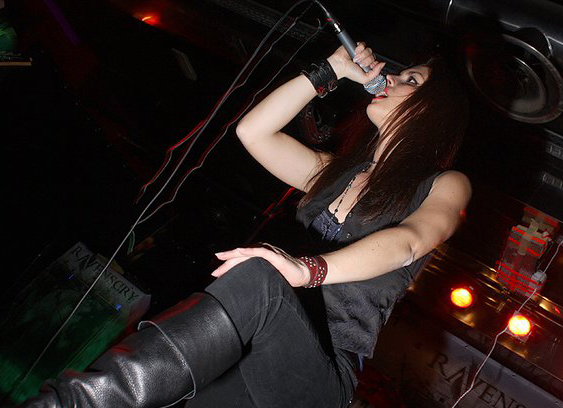
- Ravenscry performing live in Milan.

Background information
- Origin: Italy
- Genres: Alternative metal
- Years active: 2008 – present
- Members: Giulia Stefani; Paul Raimondi; Mauro Paganelli; Fagio; Simon Carminati
- Website: www.ravenscryband.com

Ravenscry is an alternative metal band from Italy.

== History ==
The project began in August 2008, near Milan, by a meeting between Paul Raimondi (guitar), Fagio (bass) and Simon Carminati (drums). Soon after, Mauro Paganelli (guitar) joined the band.

A few months later, Giulia Stefani joined the band as vocalist.

On 21 December 2009 the band released their first, self-titled EP, which is being sold through their official website, iTunes and Amazon. It contains five tracks: Nobody, Calliope, and a suite called Redemption.

On 1 October 2010 Ravenscry signed with Wormholedeath/Dreamcell11 to publish their first album named One Way Out, which was released on 15 April 2011.

The album, The Invisible, was released on 24 February 2017.

100 was released on 15 May 2020.

== Discography ==
- Ravenscry (EP) - 21 December 2009
- One Way Out (LP) - 15 April 2011
- The Attraction of Opposites - 27 May 2014
- The Invisible - 24 February 2017
- 100 - 15 May 2020

== Members ==
- Giulia Stefani (vocals)
- Paul Raimondi (guitar)
- Mauro Paganelli (guitar)
- Fagio (bass)
- Simon Carminati (drums)
