= Constricting Rage of the Merciless =

Studio album by Goatwhore
- Released: July 8, 2014
- Genre: Blackened death metal
- Length: 37:29
- Label: Metal Blade
- Producer: Erik Rutan

Goatwhore chronology
Blood for the Master (2012)	Constricting Rage of the Merciless (2014)	Vengeful Ascension (2017)

Constricting Rage of the Merciless is the sixth studio album by American blackened death metal band Goatwhore.

== Release ==
The band announced the release of their album on March 26, 2014, during their Metal Alliance tour. To make all instruments sound better, the group recorded the album on a 2-inch tape. The producer of the band was Erik Rutan at Mana Recording Studios in St. Petersburg, Florida.

== Reception ==
Professional ratings
Aggregate scores
Source	Rating
Metacritic	79/100
Review scores
Source	Rating
Blabbermouth.net	9/10
Exclaim!	8/10
Lambgoat	7/10
PopMatters	7/10 stars
Pitchfork	7/10

In an interview with Blabbermouth.net, Ray van Horn said that "Constricting Rage of the Merciless is so crazy fast and so stinking heavy you won't need anything else in your player for at least a week".

John Paul of PopMatters said that "Constricting Rage of the Merciless is a thrilling ride" and it is "unrelentingly pummeling and brutally oppressive".

Daniel Marsicano of Lambgoat said in his closing comments: "For those looking for music that'll make for sore necks and destructive tendencies, Constricting Rage of the Merciless will provide satisfaction".

Gregg Pratt of Exclaim! said that "Baring Teeth for Revolt" stands out as being particularly punk rock".

== Track listing ==
No.	Title	Length
1.	"Poisonous Existence in Reawakening"	3:47
2.	"Unraveling Paradise"	3:23
3.	"Baring Teeth for Revolt"	3:47
4.	"Reanimated Sacrifice"	3:28
5.	"Heaven's Crumbling Walls of Pity"	3:43
6.	"Cold Earth Consumed in Dying Flesh"	5:29
7.	"FBS"	3:42
8.	"Nocturnal Conjuration of the Accursed"	3:21
9.	"Schadenfreude"	3:35
10.	"Externalize This Hidden Savagery"	3:14
Total length:		37:29

== Personnel ==
=== Goatwhore ===
- Ben Falgoust – lead vocals
- Sammy Duet – guitars, backing vocals
- James Harvey – bass
- Zack Simmons – drums

=== Additional personnel ===
- Erik Rutan – production
- Jordan Barlow – artwork
- Brian Ames - layout
