= Blackout (Affiance album) =

Studio album by Affiance
- Released: September 23, 2014
- Genre: Metalcore
- Label: Bullet Tooth Records

Affiance chronology
The Campaign (2012)	Blackout (2014)

Singles from The Campaign
- 1. "Limitless" Released: June 28, 2014; 2. "Monuments Fail" Released: August 22, 2014; 3. "Fire!" Released: September 10, 2014

Blackout is the third and final full-length album by American metal band Affiance.

== Overview ==
On June 27, 2014, Affiance announced and released their first single, "Limitless", from their new full-length, Blackout, in the form of a lyric video.

On August 22, another single was released from Blackout, entitled "Monuments Fail".

On September 9, Yahoo! Music released a music video for another new single, "Fire!", on their site. Regarding the music video, guitarist Brett Wondrak commented:

"Our excitement about releasing this music video has been burning us up inside. We really wanted to turn up the heat on what is expected in music videos today. It will light a new fire in the hearts of our fans and definitely will not go up in smoke to people who are just discovering us. We believe it will ignite our careers."

When asked about the album, singer Dennis Tvrdik commented:

"We are still a relatively small band in a very big metal world and we hope to change that with this album. Blackout is a bit darker than our previous albums, and I think it’s time for heavy music with melodies to make its presence known in American metal culture. I am proud to be a part of that."

== Track listing ==
No.	Title	Length
1.	"FIRE!"	3:25
2.	"Blackout"	3:20
3.	"Limitless"	3:18
4.	"Darkest"	4:01
5.	"Monuments Fail"	3:43
6.	"In Justice"	4:06
7.	"Brothers"	4:11
8.	"Death Cycle"	3:58
9.	"No Peace"	2:40
10.	"Midnight"	5:19
Total length:		38:01

== Personnel ==
Affiance

- Patrick Galante − drums
- Dominic Dickinson − lead guitar
- Brett Wondrak − rhythm guitar
- Eric Thomas − bass guitar
- Dennis Tvrdik − vocals
