= Carving Out the Eyes of God =

Studio album by Goatwhore
- Released: June 23, 2009
- Genre: Blackened death metal
- Length: 40:40
- Label: Metal Blade
- Producer: Erik Rutan

Goatwhore chronology
A Haunting Curse (2006)	Carving Out the Eyes of God (2009)	Blood for the Master (2012)

Professional ratings
Review scores
Source	Rating
About.com	4.5/5 stars
AllMusic	3/5 stars
Blabbermouth	9/10 stars
Chronicles of Chaos	10/10 stars
Revolver	4/5 stars
Thrash Hits	5/6 stars

Carving Out the Eyes of God is the fourth studio album by American blackened death metal band Goatwhore.

== Track listing ==
No.	Title	Length
1.	"Apocalyptic Havoc"	3:16
2.	"The All-Destroying"	3:14
3.	"Carving Out the Eyes of God"	4:20
4.	"Shadow of a Rising Knife"	4:39
5.	"Provoking the Ritual of Death"	3:43
6.	"In Legions, I Am Wars of Wrath"	4:34
7.	"Reckoning of the Soul Made Godless"	3:51
8.	"This Passing into the Power of Demons"	4:27
9.	"Razor Flesh Devoured"	4:18
10.	"To Mourn and Forever Wander Through Forgotten Doorways"	4:19

Japanese Edition bonus tracks
No.	Title	Length
11.	"Alchemy of the Black Sun Cult (Live)"
12.	"In the Narrow Confines of Defilement (Live)"

Digital Edition bonus tracks
No.	Title	Length
11.	"Between the Immense and the Dead"

== Personnel ==
- Ben Falgoust – lead vocals
- Sammy Duet – guitars, backing vocals
- Nathan Bergeron – bass, backing vocals
- Zack Simmons – drums
