= Day of Vengeance (album) =

Studio album by Holy Blood
- Released: December 31, 2014
- Recorded: November 2013 – March 2014 at DHS Studio
- Genre: Melodic death metal, folk metal, doom metal, Viking metal
- Length: 37:11
- Label: Bombworks Records, Musica Production
- Producer: Matt Hunt

Holy Blood chronology
Shining Sun (2010)	Day of Vengeance (2014)	Glory to the Heroes (2017)

Day of Vengeance is the fifth studio album by Ukrainian folk metal band Holy Blood. It was released on December 31, 2014, in Russia through Musica Production and on May 18, 2015, in the rest of the world through Bombworks Records.

== Background and history ==
On December 21, 2013, Fedor Buzilevich uploaded a demo of a new song titled "Holy Blood" to his official Facebook profile. On December 25, it was added to his YouTube channel and Holy Blood's official website, while also announcing the band was in the studio.

On January 24, 2014, Buzilevich updated the band's official website, revealing the title of their upcoming album to be Day of Vengeance. He stated the album would be released in the spring of 2014 on Bombworks Records, would include 8 new songs, and the band would begin touring for the album by the end of the summer of that year.

On February 18, the band's official website was further updated, revealing a complete lineup change occurred, with the exception of Buzilevich. As a result, Buzilevich wrote and recorded the album by himself.

On March 23, Buzilevich announced that he had completed recording the album. He also unveiled the cover art of the album on his Facebook profile, and made two more songs available for streaming on Holy Blood's official website, titled "Steel Sword" and "I Believe in God".

== Sound ==
Buzilevich revealed in an interview that the album would be a departure of the band's previous folk metal sound in favor of a melodic death metal sound, though there will be some elements of folk metal, viking metal and doom metal still present.

== Cover art ==
In early January 2014, Buzilevich commented on the upcoming cover art of the album, saying:

All fans and listeners will be impressed by its future cover – creating of this cover started in 2011. It came through two years of changes and improvements and now it's almost ready. The rest is still a secret.

— Fedor Buzilevich

On February 18, the cover art was discreetly revealed as a thumbnail after the official website's discography section was updated. It was officially revealed on Buzilewicz's Facebook profile on March 23. The cover was created by Vitaliy Tretyakov, a close friend of the band.

On May 22, Tretyakov commented on the concept of the album cover, saying:

On the background, depicts the last day of the battle of Armageddon. The Tower of Babel represents human pride, and the Egyptian pyramids are human vices. Nowadays it could be some powerful world political systems that govern the world through the media and want to establish a single world order without God. In our days we may be tempted to think we no longer need to trust and obey God. We may believe that our learning, sophistication and technology are all we need to be self-sufficient and to guarantee our security. However, such self-sufficiency is a delusion and those nations and their leaders who had fallen into this trap of arrogance and self sufficiency eventually will end up in ruins.

In the center - a warrior, perhaps an Archangel, the leader of the Heavenly Host, holding a severed head of a defeated arhi demon. This shows a triumph over the world's human powers, as well as a defeat of the powers and principalities, and the rulers of the darkness of this world (i.e. spiritual wickedness in high places).

The back cover will illustrate the epilogue of this story, but the leader of the band wants to keep it in secret until the album is released.

— Vitaliy Tretyakov

== Track listing ==
No.	Title	Length
1.	"Dawn Before the Battle" (Instrumental)	1:18
2.	"Day of Vengeance"	4:15
3.	"Grey Eternity"	4:17
4.	"Holy Blood"	4:05
5.	"I Believe in God"	5:27
6.	"In Paradise" (Instrumental)	2:40
7.	"Steel Sword"	5:15
8.	"Dolorosa"	4:46
9.	"Powerless Darkness"	5:09
Total length:		37:11

== Personnel ==
Holy Blood

- Fedor Buzilevich – lead vocals, guitars, bass

Additional musicians

- Slava Malinin – drums

Production

- Matt Hunt – producer
- Vitaliy "Triptych" Tretyakov – cover art, design, layout
- Eugenia Buzilevich – promotional representative
