= Holy Blood (band) =

Ukrainian folk metal band

- Origin: Kyiv, Ukraine
- Genres: Folk metal, unblack metal, melodic death metal
- Years active: 1999–present
- Labels: Bombworks, Vision of God
- Members: Fedor Buzilevich; Deny Moshkov; Sergeii Khylko; Philipp Kharouk
- Past members: Myhaylo Rodionov; Dmitry Titorenko; Olexiy Furman; Eugeniy Tsesaryov; Vera Knyazyova; Artem Stupak; Sergiy Nagorniy; Olexiy Andrushchenko; Vladislav Malitskiy; Olexandr Omelchenko; Vyacheslav Kirishun; Igor Dziuba; Ira Klesch; Evgeniy Titarchuk; Anatoliy Bondarenko; Danylo Rybin; Oleg Bogomaz; Victor Serbin; Grigoriy Nazarov; Roman Gerchtun; Poul Guchlencko; Lev Kurgansky
- Website: www.holyblood.band

Holy Blood is a folk metal band from Kyiv, Ukraine, formed in 1999. The band is notable for being one of the few Christian bands in its genre, and the fact that they are the most successful group on its label Bombworks Records, and the band has been noted worldwide despite being an underground group. Holy Blood has released six albums: The Wanderer, Waves Are Dancing, The Patriot, Shining Sun, Day of Vengeance and Voice of Blood.

== History ==
=== Formation (1999–2000) ===
Holy Blood was formed in October 1999 and their music leaned towards hardcore punk style. The band consisted of guitarist-vocalist Fedir Buzylevych, drummer Dmytro Tytorenko, and bassist Mykhailo Rodionov. Previously, they played in a band called Voice of Cryeth in which Buzylevych played bass, Tytorenko handled keyboard, and Rodionov was the guitarist.

In 2000, the band changed their style to deathgrind. A year later in 2001 the band was joined by former Revival lead guitarist Oleksiy Furman, female keyboardist Vira Kniazeva and former Maranatha member Yevhen Tsesarev replaced Radionov as a bassist. Rodionov became a rhythm guitarist. After the line up change, Holy Blood changed their style to melodic death metal and began to record the first studio album.

=== The Wanderer (2001–2002) ===
Fedir and Vira were married in August 2001. In 2002 a local small metal label called Core Zone released the first album The Wanderer. In the middle 2002, the guitarist Oleksiy Furman left the band and was replaced by former Maranatha member Artem Stupak. Holy Blood changed their style to folk death-black metal style and Buzilevich incorporated recorder.

Rodionov left the band in 2003 and was replaced by former Celestial Call member Serhiy Nahornyi. Artem Stupak focused on his own project, unblack metal duo Evroklidon, and eventually Buzylevych became the rhythm guitarist. Serhiy Nahorny became a lead guitarist. Buzlylevych and Rodionov recorded a death-grind studio project under the name Requital and released the album Retribution for Sin. It included previously unreleased songs of Holy Blood.

In December 2003 bass-guitarist Yevhen Tsesarev left the band and was replaced by Oleksiy Andrushenko (Axxent). In the March 2004, Holy Blood was featured on a compilation of Ukrainian Christian metal bands called Total Armageddon.

=== Waves Are Dancing and The Patriot (2003–2008) ===
On April 18, 2004, the band shot their first music video called "The Spring". During the same month the band launched its website and afterwards their popularity increased notably outside their native country, and started writing third album. later that year, Holy Blood caught the interest of Texas-based records label Bombworks Records. The band signed a record deal with the label which released "The Wanderer" to available in many different countries. In October band played concerts in Belarus and participated Hear My Call Tour.

In 2005, Bombworks Records released Holy Blood's second album, Waves Are Dancing, and it was also released by young Russian label called Musica Production. On July 2, the keyboardist Vira Kniazeva left the band and was replaced by former Gefsad member Volodyslav Malytskyi. In October, the band was joined by Viacheslav Kirishyn who plays instruments such as bagpipe and flute.

In June 2006, Viacheslav has left the band. 2006 year was successful concert year for the band. Holy Blood played in different cities of Ukraine and also played in Moldova and notable foreign festivals such as Elements of Rock in Switzerland and Maata Näkyvissä in Finland. On December 1, Jmak Agency shot a professional music video for the self-titled song from the third album The Patriot, released in early July 2008, and the Russian label Musica Production re-released the first album The Wanderer with new artwork.

=== Shining Sun (2010–2012) ===
In late 2008, the band went through major line-up changes: in a press release on their website, it was announced that all other members apart from Fedir Buzylevych left to continue under a different name, Oskord, while Fedir will continue under the Holy Blood moniker with new members, including his wife Vira, who was previously in Holy Blood from 2001 to 2005. With new members surrounding Fedir and Vira, Holy Blood completed fourth album, Shining Sun, in early 2010. The band stated in a MySpace blog that the album features "a combination of traditional Folk Metal with elements of Melodic Metalcore, and elements of new school Hardcore."

In 2011, Grigoriy Nazarov replaced Igor Dziuba on rhythm guitar. In 2012, Roman Gerchtun and Poul Guchlencko replaced Ira Klesch and Victor Serbin on bass and drums, respectively.

=== Day of Vengeance, Glory to the Heroes EP and Voice of Blood (2013–present) ===
On December 25, 2013, the band announced they are in the studio working on a new album, and released a promotional video featuring a demo of a new song: "Holy Blood".

In January 2014, the band announced the title of the upcoming album to be Day of Vengeance, which will be released in the later that year.

On February 18, the band's official website was updated, revealing a complete lineup change occurred once again, with the exception of Buzilevich. As a result, Buzilevich wrote and recorded Day of Vengeance by himself.

On December 14, Fedor Buzilevich uploaded "Ukraine", a new song to the band's website and announced he has starting writing for the band's sixth studio album.

Day of Vengeance was released on December 31, 2014 in Russia and May 18, 2015 for the rest of the world.

In April 2017, it was announced that Holy Blood had signed to Vision of God Records, and released a new EP, Glory to the Heroes, on May 10, 2017.

On February 15, 2019, the band released their sixth full-length studio album, Voice of Blood.

== Music ==
Holy Blood plays folk metal with death and black metal elements. Their music is characterized by elements based on Ukrainian folk traditions and Celtic music. They incorporate ethnic instruments such as blockflute and bagpipe. The vocals are high-pitched shrieking but also incorporates folk choirs. The band is influenced by groups such as Ensiferum and Finntroll. The Wanderer has been compared to melodic black metal groups such as Dissection but is said to be more modern in sound and style. The Wanderer is also said to contain more variety and complex songwriting than Waves Are Dancing does. Waves are Dancing embraced more folk oriented direction as majority of the songs incorporate flute and bagpipe. Several songs incorporate guitar solos keyboards and folk choirs. Holy Blood's lyrical themes tend to revolve around their Christian faith, heaven, and God.

== Band members ==
Current members

- Fedor Buzilevich – lead vocals (1999–present), flute (2002–2013), rhythm guitar (1999–2001, 2003–2008, 2013–present)
- Sergeii Khylko – flute (2016–present)
- Philipp Kharouk – drums (2018–present)
- Andriy Iakovenko – bass (2019–present)

Former members

- Dmitry Titorenko – drums (1999–2008)
- Myhaylo Rodionov – rhythm guitar (2001–2003), bass (1999–2001)
- Vera Knyazyova – keyboards, vocals (2001–2005, 2008–2013), lead vocals, bagpipes (2008–2013)
- Eugeniy Tsesaryov – bass (2001–2003)
- Olexiy Furman – lead guitar (2001–2002)
- Artem Stupak – lead guitar (2002–2003)
- Sergiy Nagorniy – lead guitar (2003–2008), rhythm guitar (2003)
- Olexiy Andrushchenko – bass (2003–2008)
- Vladislav Malitskiy – keyboards (2005–2008)
- Vyacheslav Kirishun – bagpipes, flute (2005–2006)
- Evgeniy Titarchuk – lead guitar (2008–2013)
- Ira Klesch – bass (2008–2012)
- Igor Dziuba – rhythm guitar (2008–2011)
- Olexandr Omelchenko – drums (2008–2009)
- Oleg Bogomaz – drums (2009–2010)
- Anatoliy Bondarenko – drums (2009)
- Danylo Rybin – drums (2009)
- Victor Serbin – drums (2010–2012)
- Grigoriy Nazarov – rhythm guitar (2011–2013)
- Roman Gerchtun – bass (2012–2013)
- Poul Guchlencko – drums (2012–2013)
- Deny Moshkov – bass (2016–2019)
- Lev Kurgansky – drums (2016–2018)

Timeline

== Discography ==
=== Studio albums ===
- The Wanderer (2002)
- Waves Are Dancing (2005)
- The Patriot (2008)
- Shining Sun (2010)
- Day of Vengeance (2014)
- Voice of Blood (2019)

=== EPs ===
- Glory to the Heroes (2017)
