= Goatwhore =

American extreme metal band

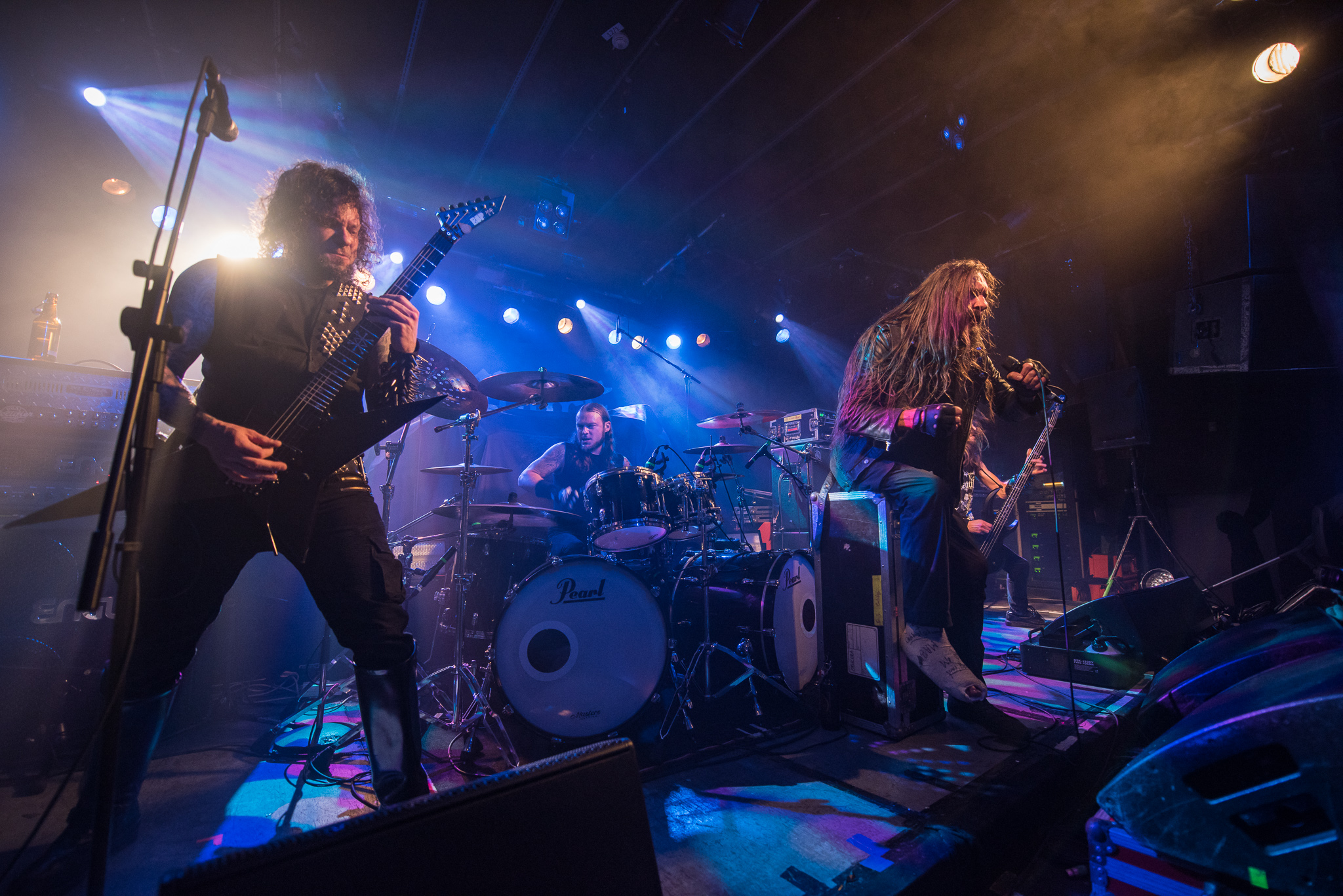
- Goatwhore performing in 2018

Background information
- Origin: New Orleans, Louisiana, U.S.
- Genre: Blackened death metal
- Years active: 1997–present
- Labels: Metal Blade, Noise
- Members: Sammy Duet; L. Ben Falgoust II; Zack Simmons; Robert Coleman
- Past members: Ben Stout; Zak Nolan; Pat Bruders; Tim Holsinger; Nathan Bergeron; Jared Benoit; James Harvey
- Website: goatwhore.net

Goatwhore is an American blackened death metal band formed in New Orleans, Louisiana, in 1997, known for their themes of Satanism. Their sound is said to be "distinctly southern".

== History ==
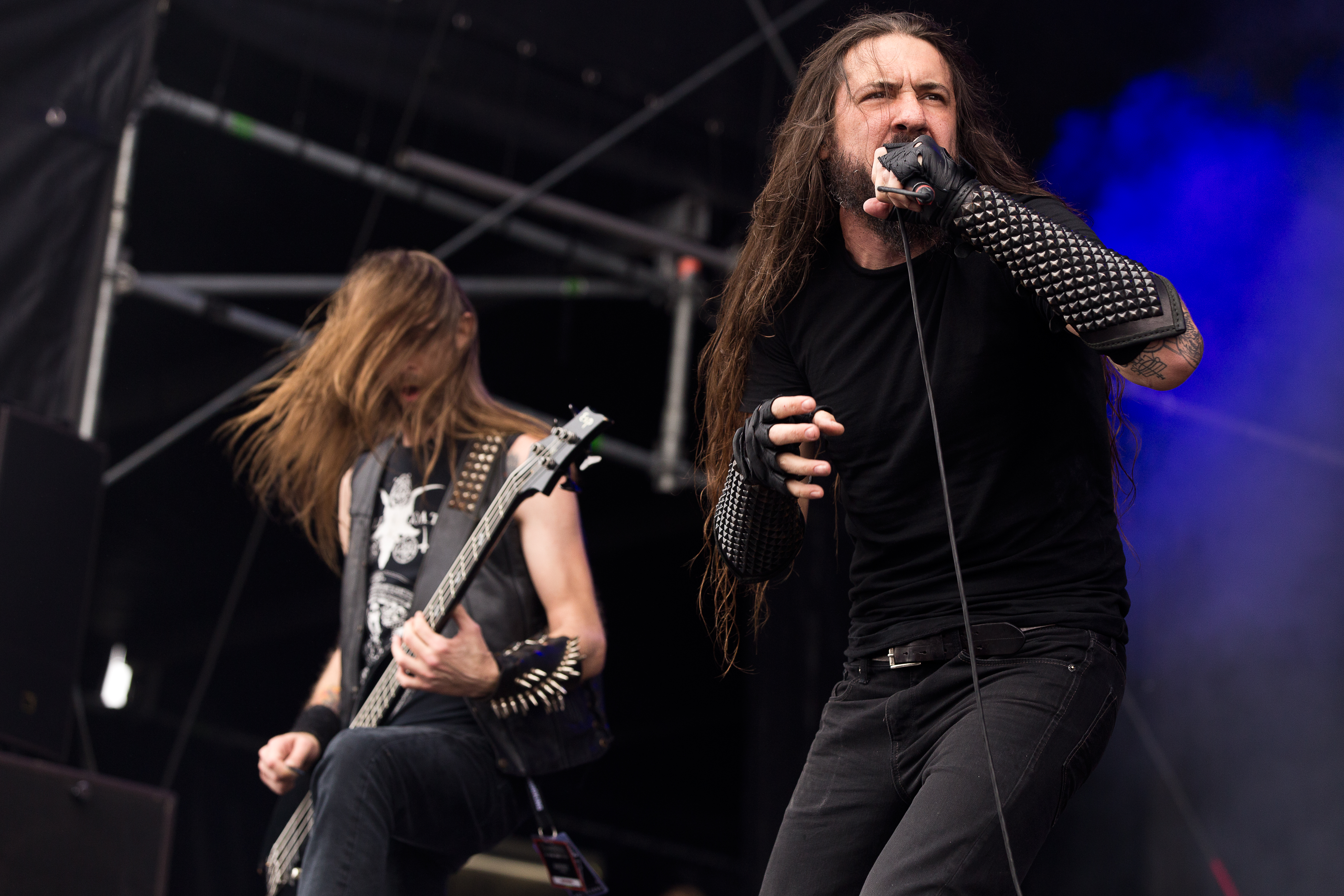
Goatwhore at Party.San Metal Open Air, Germany, 2016

Goatwhore was formed by guitarist/backing vocalist Sammy Duet, previously the lead guitarist for Louisiana sludge metal band Acid Bath. The band's name derives from a drunken description of an exotic dancer as having "pigtails and a kind of long face."

The band dates back to 1991, when it was known as Killgore, with Duet on lead guitar and vocals and Zak Nolan on drums. Killgore released a number of demos and changed their name to Goatwhore in 1997, after Acid Bath dissolved due to the death of bassist Audie Pitre. Soilent Green lead vocalist Louis Benjamin Falgoust II, rhythm guitarist Ben Stout, and bassist Pat Bruders completed the lineup, which debuted with the demo Serenades to the Tides of Blood. Goatwhore's official debut LP, The Eclipse of Ages into Black, followed in early 2000. Funeral Dirge for the Rotting Sun appeared in 2003. The band signed to Metal Blade for the fall release of 2006's A Haunting Curse. In 2009, Goatwhore released Carving Out the Eyes of God, followed by Blood for the Master, in 2012.

On March 10, 2014, the band completed recording Constricting Rage of the Merciless, released on July 8, 2014.

Goatwhore supported Amon Amarth on their tour of North America in May 2017. Vengeful Ascension was released on June 23, 2017. It was the last album to feature bassist James Harvey, who departed the band that year, and was replaced with Robert Coleman after serving as the band's live bassist since 2014. Harvey died on July 26, 2023, at the age of 35. The band played at Milwaukee Metal Fest one month earlier.

In 2025, the band participated in the Hell's Heroes music festival at the White Oak Music Hall in Houston.

== Band members ==
Goatwhore live at Party.San 2016

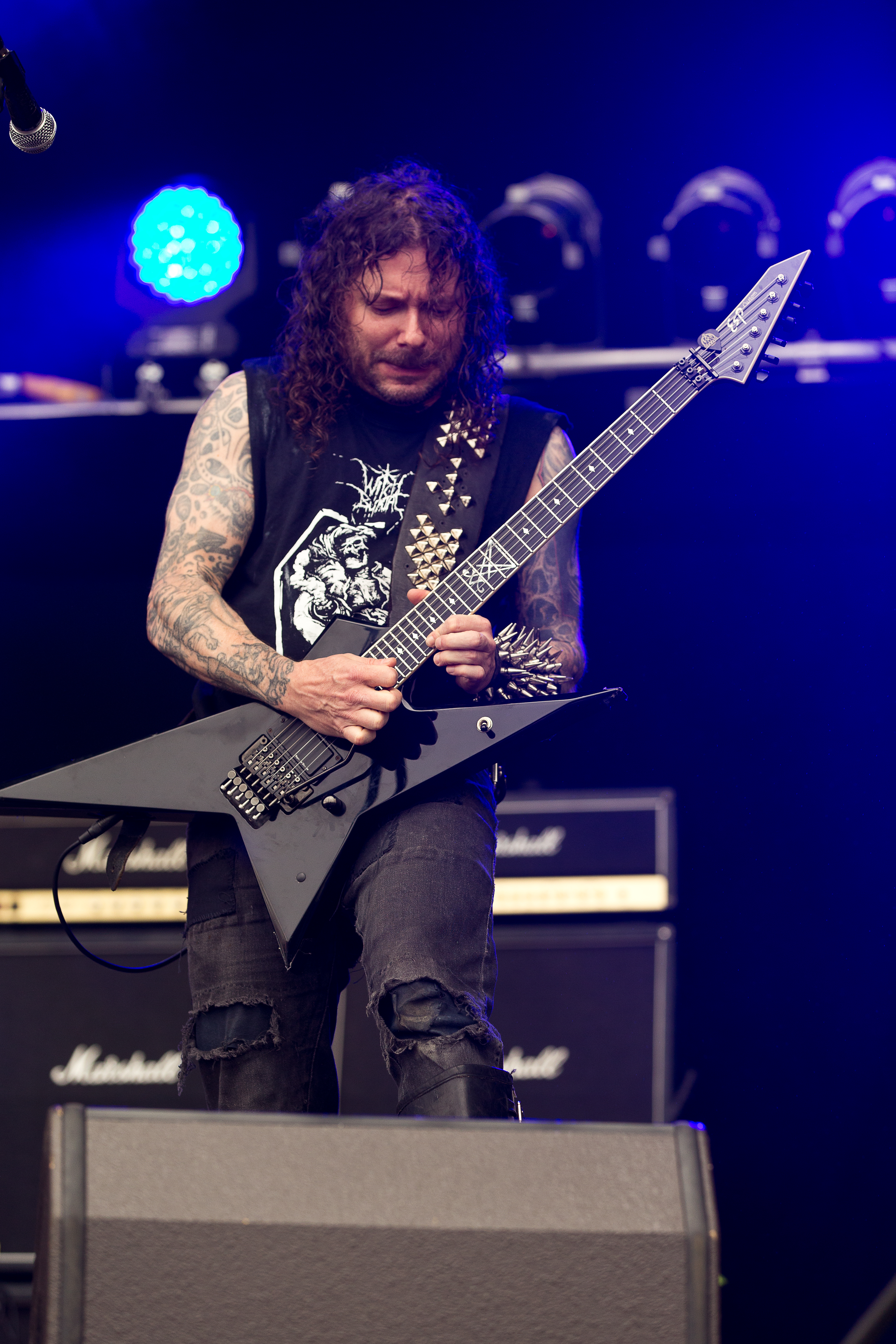
Sammy Duet

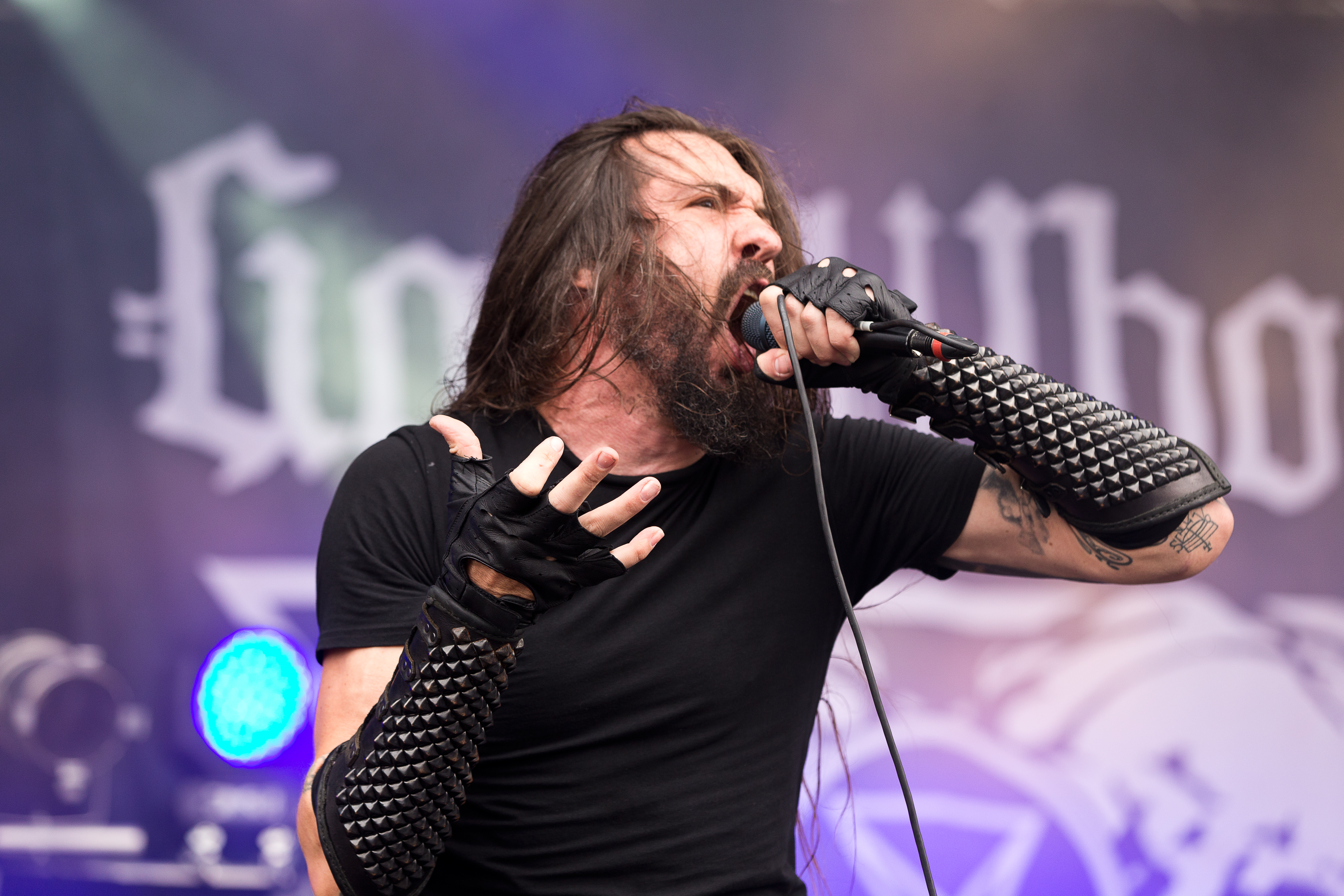
Louis Benjamin Falgoust

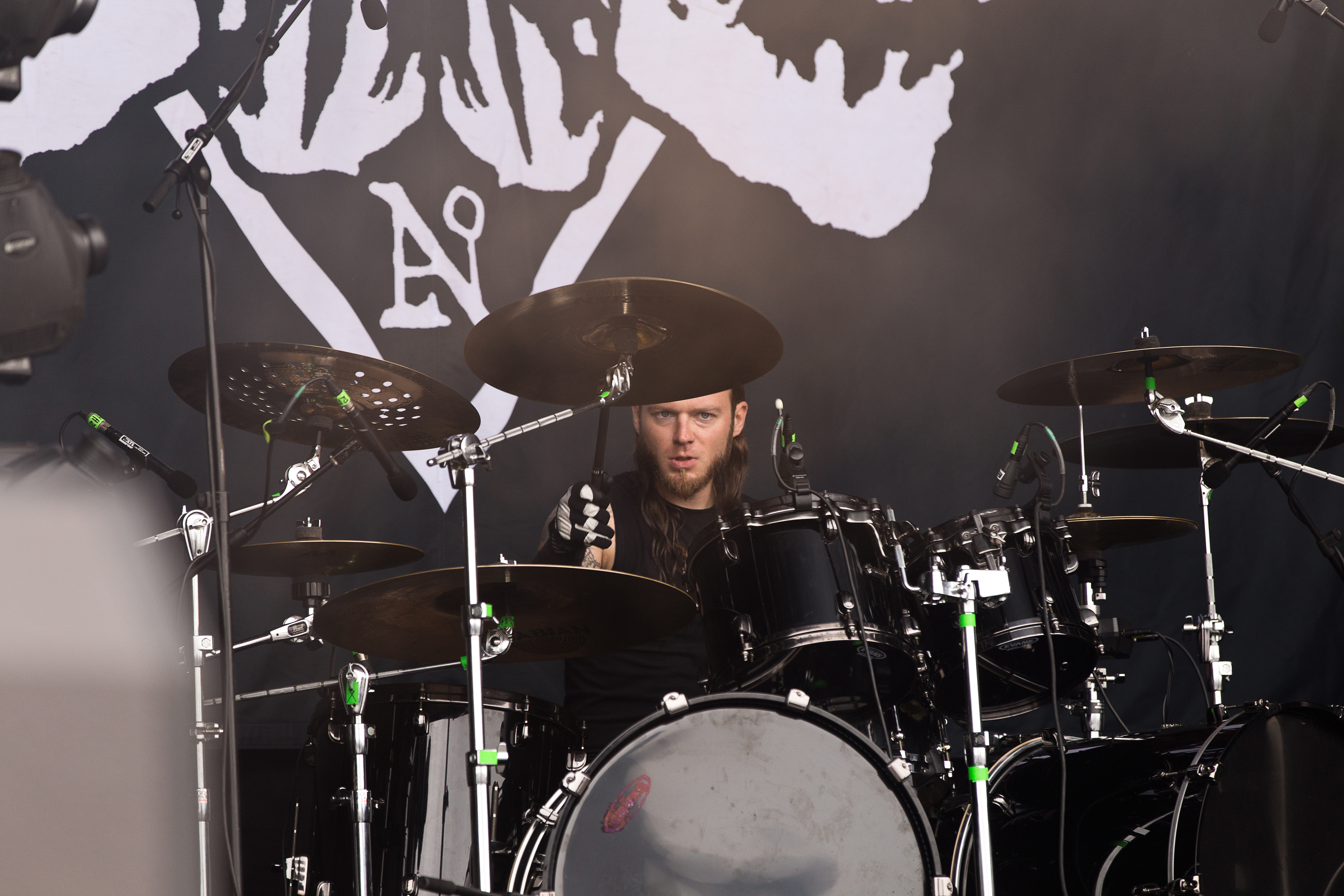
Zack Simmons

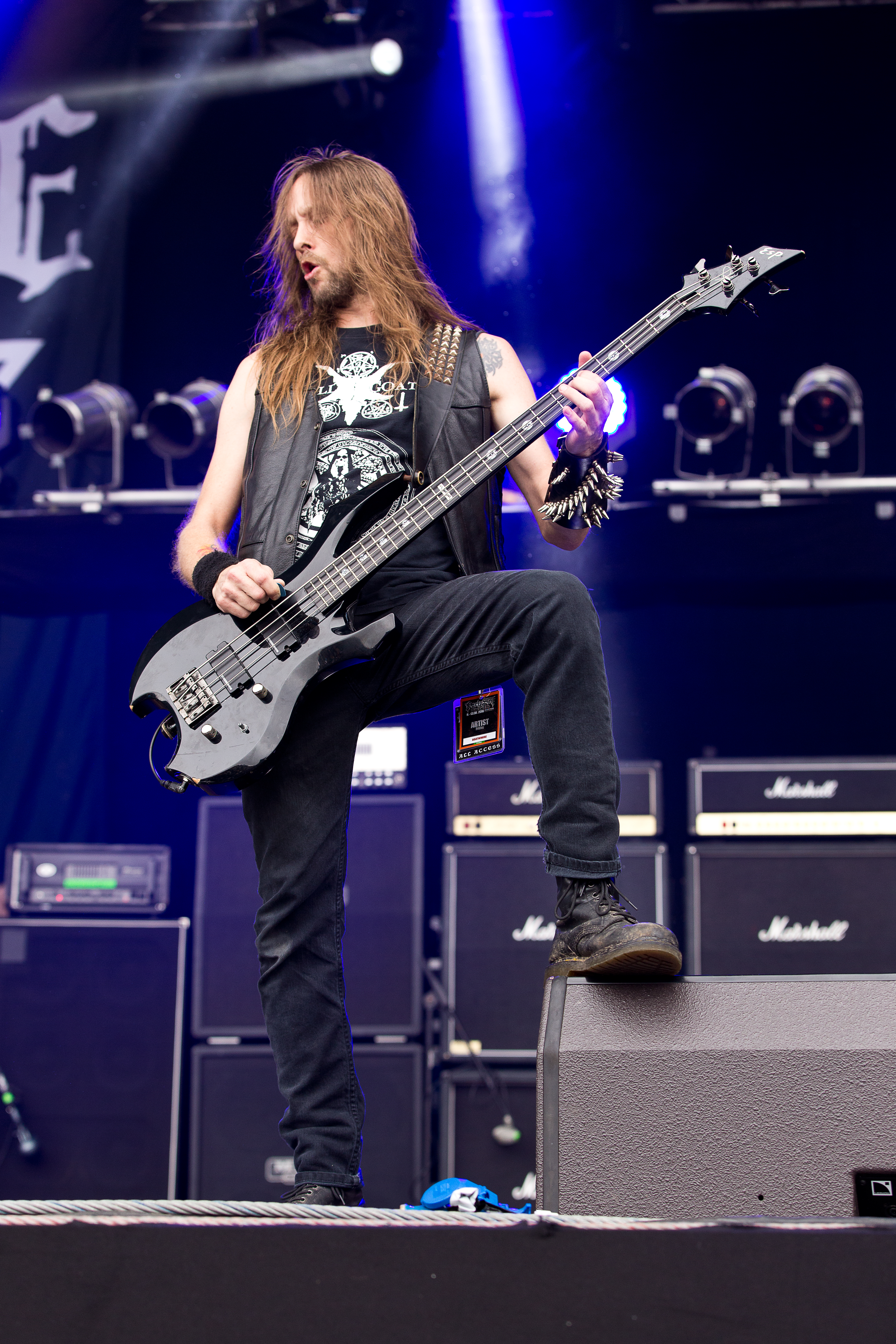
Robert "Trans Am" Coleman

Current members

- Sammy Duet – guitars (1997–present), backing vocals (1998–present), lead vocals (1997–1998)
- L. Ben Falgoust II – lead vocals (1998–present)
- Zack Simmons – drums (2004–present)
- Robert "Trans Am" Coleman – bass (2017–present, touring 2014–2017)

Touring members

- Sam "Samus" Paulicelli – bass (2009)

Former members

- Jared Benoit – lead vocals (1997)
- Ben Stout – guitars (1997–2002)
- Zak Nolan – drums (1997–2003)
- Pat Bruders – bass (1997–2004)
- Tim Holsinger – guitars (2002–2003)
- Nathan Bergeron – bass, backing vocals (2004–2009)
- James Harvey – bass (2009–2017; died 2023)

== Discography ==
=== Studio albums ===
- The Eclipse of Ages into Black (2000)
- Funeral Dirge for the Rotting Sun (2003)
- A Haunting Curse (2006)
- Carving Out the Eyes of God (2009)
- Blood for the Master (2012)
- Constricting Rage of the Merciless (2014)
- Vengeful Ascension (2017)
- Angels Hung from the Arches of Heaven (2022)

=== Split albums ===
- Goatwhore / Epoch of Unlight (2003)

=== Singles ===
- "(Don't Need) Religion" (2011)
- "Command to Destroy" (2017)

=== Demos ===
- Serenades to the Tides of Blood (1998)
