= Chronological list of Brazilian classical composers =

The following is a chronological list of Brazilian classical composers:

== Baroque ==
- António José da Silva (1705–1739)

== Classical ==
- José Joaquim Emerico Lobo de Mesquita (1746–1805)
- Francisco Gomes da Rocha (1746–1808)
- André da Silva Gomes (1752–1844)
- Marcos Coelho Neto (1763–1823)
- José Maurício Nunes Garcia (1767–1830)

== Romantic ==
- Damião Barbosa de Araújo (1778–1856)
- Elias Álvares Lobo (1834–1901)
- Antônio Carlos Gomes (1836–1896)
- Brasílio Itiberê da Cunha (1846–1913)
- Chiquinha Gonzaga (1847–1935)
- Leopoldo Miguez (1850–1902)
- Henrique Oswald (1852–1931)
- Ernesto Nazareth (1863-1934)
- Alexandre Levy (1864–1892)
- Alberto Nepomuceno (1864–1920)
- Francisco Braga (1868–1945)

== Modern/Contemporary ==
- Zequinha de Abreu (1880–1935)
- Heitor Villa-Lobos (1887–1959)
- Ernani Braga (1888–1948)
- Luciano Gallet (1893–1931)
- Oscar Lorenzo Fernández (1897–1948)
- Francisco Mignone (1897–1986)
- Radamés Gnattali (1906–1988)
- Mozart Camargo Guarnieri (1907–1993)
- Walter Smetak (1913–1984)
- César Guerra-Peixe (1914–1993)
- Eunice Katunda (1915–1990)
- Cláudio Santoro (1919–1989)
- Gilberto Mendes (1922–2016)
- Osvaldo Lacerda (1927–1990)
- Edino Krieger (1928-2022)
- Rogério Duprat (1932–2006)
- Jocy de Oliveira (born 1936)
- Willy Corrêa de Oliveira (born 1938)
- Marlos Nobre (1939-2024)
- Ricardo Tacuchian (born 1939)
- Jorge Antunes (born 1942)
- José Antônio de Almeida Prado (1943-2010)
- Marisa Rezende (born 1944)
- Vânia Dantas Leite (1945-2018)
- Ronaldo Miranda (born 1948)
- Ernani Aguiar (born 1950)
- José Carlos Amaral Vieira (born 1952)
- Paulo Costa Lima (born 1954)
- Sílvio Ferraz (born 1959)
- Kilza Setti (born 1965)
- Marcos Balter (born 1974)
