= List of Brazilian composers =

This is a list of composers who are either native to the country of Brazil, are a citizen of that nation, or have spent a major portion of their career living and working in Brazil. The list is arranged in alphabetical order:

== A ==
- Ernani Aguiar (born 1950)
- José Antônio Rezende de Almeida Prado (1943–2010)
- Jadir Ambrósio (1922-2014)
- Jorge Antunes (born 1942)
- Armandinho (born 1953)
- Clarice Assad (born 1978)
- Sergio Assad (born 1952)
- Itamar Assumpção (1949–2003)

== B ==
- Marcos Balter (born 1974)
- Jacob do Bandolim (1918–1969)
- Damião Barbosa de Araújo (1778–1856)
- Cacilda Borges Barbosa (1914–2010)
- Ary Barroso (1903–1964)
- Belchior (singer) (1946–2017)
- Tony Bellotto (born 1960)
- Rafael Bittencourt
- Aldir Blanc (1946–2020)
- Luiz Bonfá (1922–2001)
- Renato Borghetti (born 1963)
- Ronaldo Bôscoli (1928–1994)
- Cláudio Botelho (born 1964)
- Francisco Braga (1868–1945)
- Ernani Braga (1888–1948)
- Leci Brandão (born 1944)
- Jayme Caetano Braun (1924–1999)
- Sérgio Britto (born 1959)
- Chico Buarque (born 1944)

== C ==
- Lina Pires de Campos (1918–2003)
- Cláudio Camunguelo (1947–2007)
- Fábio Caramuru (born 1956)
- Altamiro Carrilho (1924–2012)
- Cartola (1908–1980)
- Dinorá de Carvalho (1904/5–1980)
- Sergio Cassiano (born 1967)
- Nelson Cavaquinho (1911–1986)
- Danilo Caymmi (born 1948)
- Cazuza (1958–1990)
- Celeste Jaguaribe de Matos Faria (1873–1938)
- Clarisse Leite (1917–2003)
- Baby Consuelo (born 1952)
- Fabio Costa (born 1971)
- Sueli Costa (1943–2023)
- Yamandu Costa (born 1980)
- Henrique de Curitiba (1934–2008)

== D ==
- Braz da Viola (born 1961)
- Sandra de Sá (born 1955)
- Dominguinhos (1941–2013)
- Rogério Duprat (1932–2006)

== F ==
- Marcelo Falcão (born 1973)
- Márcio Faraco (born 1963)
- Maria Helena Rosas Fernandes (born 1933)
- Oscar Lorenzo Fernández (1897–1948)
- Ronaldo Folegatti (1958–2007)
- Walter Franco (1945–2019)
- Marcelo Fromer (1961–2001)

== G ==
- Luciano Gallet (1893–1931)
- Edu da Gaita (1916–1982)
- Léo Gandelman (born 1956)
- José Maurício Nunes Garcia (1767–1830)
- Charles Gavin (born 1960)
- Egberto Gismonti (born 1947)
- Radamés Gnattali (1906–1988)
- Zequinha de Abreu (1880–1935)
- Antônio Carlos Gomes (1836–1896)
- Chiquinha Gonzaga (1847–1935)
- Gonzaguinha (1945–1991)
- Camargo Guarnieri (1907–1993)
- Fátima Guedes (born 1958)
- César Guerra-Peixe (1914–1993)
- Guinga (born 1950)

== H ==
- Waldemar Henrique
- Amy Elsie Horrocks

== J ==
- Najla Jabor
- Léo Jaime
- Antonio Carlos Jobim
- Henry Jolles
- Jorge Ben Jor
- Flávio José

== K ==
- Eunice Katunda
- Hans-Joachim Koellreutter

== L ==
- Osvaldo Lacerda
- Dona Ivone Lara
- Victor Lazzarini
- Rita Lee
- Vânia Dantas Leite
- Alexandre Levy
- Marina Lima
- Paulo Costa Lima
- Ivan Lins
- Emerico Lobo de Mesquita
- Elias Álvares Lobo
- Edu Lobo

== M ==
- João MacDowell
- Ernst Mahle
- Luísa Maita
- Gui Mallon
- Luiz Marenco
- Ugo Marotta
- Herivelto Martins
- Jorge Mautner
- Julio Medaglia
- Ernst Mehlich
- Helena Meirelles
- Branco Mello
- Gilberto Mendes
- Eduardo Mendonça
- Alexandre Menezes
- Francisco Mignone
- Leopoldo Miguez
- Paulo Miklos
- Eduardo Reck Miranda
- Ronaldo Miranda
- Miúcha
- Marisa Monte
- Jaques Morelenbaum
- Túlio Mourão

== N ==
- Ernesto Nazareth
- Milton Nascimento
- Alberto Nepomuceno
- Dudu Nobre
- Marlos Nobre
- Ilza Nogueira
- João Nogueira

== O ==
- Jocy de Oliveira
- Henrique Oswald

== P ==
- Hermeto Pascoal
- Pit Passarell
- Heitor Pereira
- Emanuel Dimas de Melo Pimenta
- Leila Pinheiro
- Pixinguinha

== R ==
- Zé Ramalho
- Robertinho do Recife
- Dilermando Reis
- Nando Reis
- Marisa Rezende
- Angela Ro Ro
- Lupicínio Rodrigues
- Zé Rodrix
- Dom Um Romão
- Noel Rosa

== S ==
- Tico Santa Cruz
- Cláudio Santoro
- Guido Santórsola
- Arthur Napoleão dos Santos
- Moacir Santos
- Esther Scliar
- Kilza Setti
- Francisco Manuel da Silva
- Joaquim Antonio (Callado) da Silva
- Adelaide Pereira da Silva
- Joanídia Sodré
- Mitar Subotić

== T ==
- Ricardo Tacuchian
- Sebastião Tapajós
- Wagner Tiso
- Dudu Tucci

== V ==
- Alceu Valença
- Geraldo Vandré
- Paulo Vanzolini
- Caetano Veloso
- José Carlos Amaral Vieira
- Ivan Vilela
- Martinho da Vila
- Heitor Villa-Lobos

== Z ==
- Kiko Zambianchi
- Edson Zampronha

== See also ==
- Chronological list of Brazilian classical composers
- Music of Brazil
