= Antônio dos Santos Cunha =

Brazilian composer and civil servant (c. 1780 – 1830)

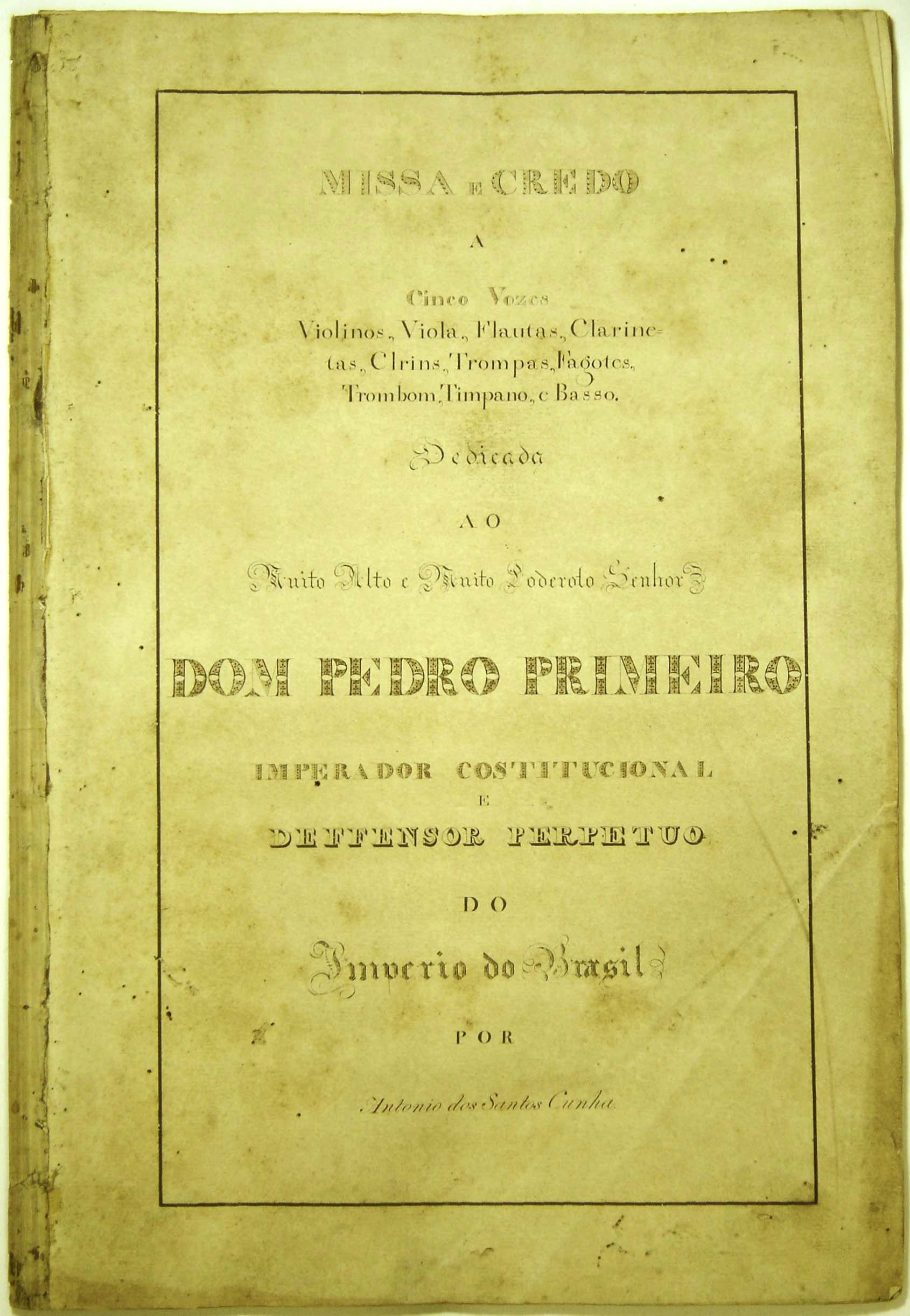
- Title page of the presentation manuscript of Cunha's Missa e Credo a Cinco Vozes

Background information
- Born: c. 1780; Meia Ponte, Colonial Brazil
- Died: 19 November 1830 Rio de Janeiro, Empire of Brazil
- Genre: Sacred music
- Occupations: Composer; civil servant

Antônio dos Santos Cunha (c. 1780 – 19 November 1830) was a Brazilian composer of sacred music and civil servant. Born in Meia Ponte, in the Captaincy of Goiás, (Note: A captaincy was a large administrative division of Portuguese America, governed in the name of the Crown. It was not the same as a modern Brazilian state.) he grew up in São João del-Rei, crossed the Atlantic to live and work in Portugal, and spent his final years in Rio de Janeiro.

Cunha wrote Masses, Holy Week responsories (Note: A responsory is a piece sung in alternation between a soloist or small group and a choir during a church service. Cunha's responsories were written for the solemn services of Holy Week.) and music for the Novena de Nossa Senhora da Boa Morte. (Note: The title means "Novena of Our Lady of the Good Death". A novena is a sequence of prayers or services held over nine days or on nine occasions.) His compositions traveled farther and lasted longer than the surviving account of his life. They were copied and performed in São João del-Rei while he lived elsewhere, then passed from one generation of singers, instrumentalists and copyists to another for decades after his death. Manuscripts in his hand and later performing parts (Note: A performing part is the separate sheet or booklet used by one singer or instrumentalist. A full score shows all the parts together.) are kept by the Orquestra Ribeiro Bastos, the Orquestra Lira Sanjoanense and the Metropolitan Chapter of Rio de Janeiro. (Note: A cathedral chapter is a body of clergy responsible for the worship and administration of a cathedral. "Metropolitan" means that the cathedral is the seat of an archbishop.)

His larger works move between the collective weight of the chorus and the intimacy of solo arias, duets and trios. Clarinet solos, chromatic horn passages and high violin writing give the instrumental parts a voice of their own, while some vocal movements draw on the expressive and technical language of Italian opera. Cunha's name faded from general view, but his music remained in manuscript books, church archives and local performance. Editions, recordings and new performances since the late twentieth century have centered on the Missa Grande (Note: Missa Grande literally means "Great Mass" or "Large Mass". It is the Portuguese title used for the work in the manuscripts and modern studies.) and the Missa e Credo a Cinco Vozes. (Note: The title means "Mass and Creed for Five Voices". Here, "five voices" means five independent vocal parts, not necessarily five individual singers.)>

== Life ==
=== Origins and family ===
Cunha was born around 1780 in Meia Ponte, in the Captaincy of Goiás.

His mother, Angélica de Oliveira Rosa, was born in Santa Luzia, in the comarca of Sabará. (Note: A comarca was a judicial and administrative district. In colonial Brazil, it usually covered a wider area than a town or municipality.) She went to Goiás, where Cunha and his sister, Ana Francisca de São José, were born, and had settled in São João del-Rei by 1787. Angélica remained unmarried. She owned property and enslaved people and belonged to the brotherhoods (Note: Lay Catholic brotherhoods organized worship, processions, burials and charitable work. They also hired singers and instrumentalists for feast days and Holy Week services.) of São Miguel e Almas, Nossa Senhora do Rosário and the Blessed Sacrament, as well as the Third Order of Saint Francis. (Note: A third order is a lay branch of a Catholic religious order. Its members follow parts of the order's spiritual rule while living outside a monastery or convent.) Her will, written in 1836, named Antônio and Ana Francisca as her natural children and made her grandchildren her heirs. (Note: In the legal and ecclesiastical terminology of the period, a "natural child" was one born outside marriage.)

The marriage register and baptismal entries for eight of Cunha's children name an elder Antônio dos Santos Cunha as his father. In these entries, the elder Cunha was born in Rio de Janeiro and held the rank of ensign in 1801 and sergeant-major by 1809. Angélica did not name the father of either child in her will. Pardini and Rocha leave open the possibility that this paternal lineage was supplied after the fact as Cunha sought the standing attached to legitimate descent. The precise identity and part played by the elder Cunha remain uncertain.

=== São João del-Rei and religious associations ===
One of the earliest glimpses of Cunha in São João del-Rei comes from a baptism in 1793, when he carried a legal proxy for his mother. On 6 January 1796, he joined the Brotherhood of Our Lady of the Rosary and Saint Benedict of the Black Men. Its book called him white. For his admission, he gave a ceremonial tunic for an image of Our Lady of Remedies.

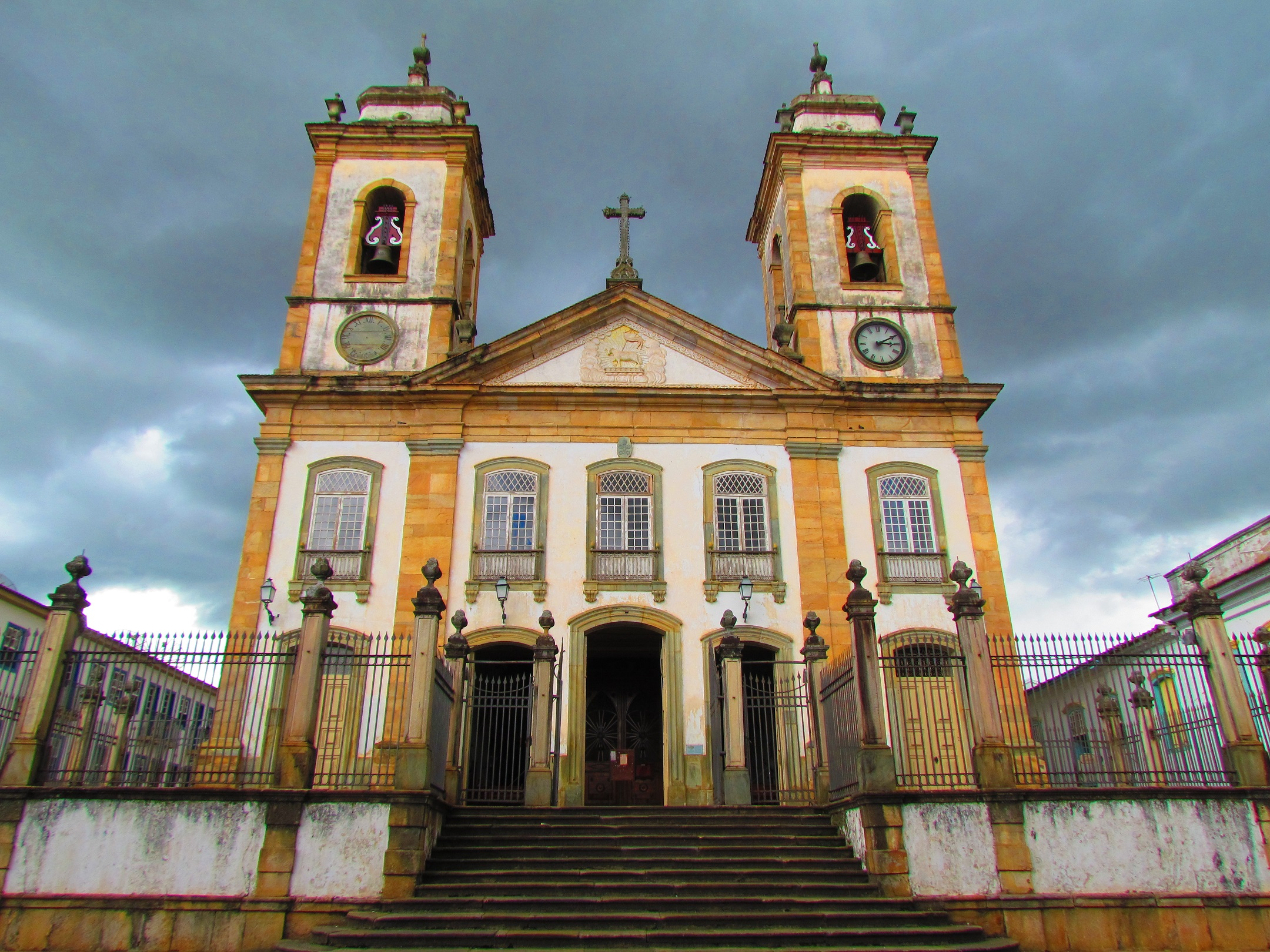
Church of Our Lady of the Pillar in São João del-Rei, where Cunha's son Pedro was baptized in 1821.

By 1800, Cunha was paying dues to the Third Order of Our Lady of Mount Carmel. He joined the Brotherhood of Senhor Bom Jesus dos Passos on 17 February 1801 and sold a book to the Brotherhood of São Miguel e Almas that same year. These groups organized chapels, processions and feast days, and hired musicians for church services. Cunha belonged to the same circles through which his music would later pass in São João del-Rei.

Cunha was also trusted with formal errands. In 1801, he carried a proxy for a baptismal sponsor. He did the same the following year at the baptism of a child born to an enslaved woman. Such duties required someone able to read, write and handle legal papers. Where Cunha learned music, or whether he studied with a teacher, remains unknown.

=== Portugal and return to Brazil ===
By 1807, Cunha was living in Portugal. On 22 November, he married Helena Sofia Lassance at the parish church of São Pedro in Alenquer. He gave Meia Ponte as his birthplace. Helena had been born in Lisbon in 1791 and was the daughter of Carlos Lassance and Cecília Augusta da Silva Arnaut.

Their children were baptized in Torre de Moncorvo, Chaves and Lisbon between 1809 and 1818. The family moved through northern Portugal during the Peninsular War and the unsettled years that followed. Around 1815, a note from the Third Order of Mount Carmel called Cunha "absent for Lisbon". The note is known from a later transcription, as the original entry has not been found. It is not known why he left Brazil, and no musical employment has been found for his years in Portugal.

By March 1819, Cunha worked in the military supply administration of Trás-os-Montes as the first clerk in the accounting office of the province's Commissariat Department. He received one year's leave to travel from Lisbon to Rio de Janeiro with Helena and five young children. The passport said that he was returning to attend to personal business.

The family had returned to São João del-Rei by 1820, when Cunha paid his yearly dues to the Brotherhood of Senhor Bom Jesus dos Passos. His son Pedro was baptized at the Church of Our Lady of the Pillar on 6 April 1821. The next year, Cunha gave 4$800 (Note: In nineteenth-century Brazilian notation, the dollar sign separated thousands of réis. The amount 4$800 meant 4,800 réis.) toward a public fountain planned for the Largo de São Francisco. On 21 May, at Juvêncio's baptism, Cunha granted the newborn boy his freedom. Juvêncio was the son of Mariana, an enslaved woman in Cunha's household.

From 31 December 1821, Cunha worked as a clerk at the Army Arsenal's Powder Factory in Rio de Janeiro. He still had family and confraternal affairs in São João del-Rei in 1821 and 1822, before his household settled in the capital.

=== Rio de Janeiro and final years ===
From 31 December 1821, Cunha worked as a clerk at the Powder Factory of the Army Arsenal near Lagoa Rodrigo de Freitas, where he managed accounts and paperwork from 1821 to 1829. In 1823, he was also a member of the 4th Company of the 2nd Infantry Battalion of the city's Civic Guard. He also served as accounting officer for the municipal council from 1827 until his death. Pedro I admitted him to the Order of Christ on 1 October 1827. (Note: Receiving the "habit" of an order meant being admitted to it and gaining the right to wear its insignia. It did not refer simply to a piece of clothing.)

Music occupied the time he could spare from work and family. Between January 1822 and May 1823, Cunha composed the Missa e Credo a Cinco Vozes and dedicated it to Pedro I. The work was considered for a ceremony of the General Assembly of the Empire on 1 May 1823, where José Maurício Nunes Garcia directed the music.

The Diario do Governo reported that Cunha's Mass had been performed that day. Cunha wrote to the newspaper on 16 May to correct the report. He had offered the work to the emperor, but another Mass was chosen. He explained that his score was too large and required more preparation than the ceremony allowed.

Cunha also took part in plans for a bronze equestrian statue of Pedro I. In June 1825, he joined the supporters called together by the municipal senate of Rio de Janeiro. On 21 April 1826, he delivered 383$880 to the General Treasury, money collected in São João del-Rei for the proposed monument.

Cunha died at his home on Rua dos Ferradores in Rio de Janeiro on 19 November 1830. The street was later renamed Rua Gonçalves Dias. His cause of death was not given. He received the sacraments, was dressed in the habit of the Third Order of the Minims of Saint Francis of Paola, and was taken to the order's church for burial. Helena remained in Rio de Janeiro and lived on Rua da Alfândega until her death in 1845.

== Music ==
Cunha wrote sacred music for Mass, Holy Week and Marian celebrations. His known works include the Holy Week responsories, the Novena de Nossa Senhora da Boa Morte, the four-voice Missa Grande, the Missa e Credo a Cinco Vozes and a Pange lingua (Note: Pange lingua is Latin for "Sing, my tongue". It is a Catholic hymn sung during worship and processions involving the Eucharist.) that may also be his.

His music remained in use in São João del-Rei through handwritten scores and performing parts passed from one musician to another. Some are in Cunha's own hand. Others were copied years or decades after his death. Most are kept by the Orquestra Ribeiro Bastos and the Orquestra Lira Sanjoanense, while another manuscript is held by the Metropolitan Chapter of Rio de Janeiro.

=== Manuscripts and transmission ===
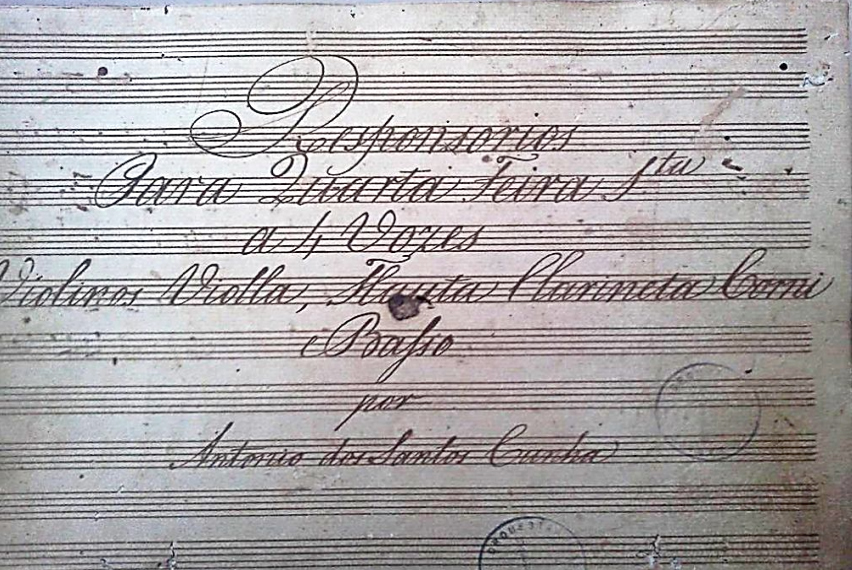
Detail from the cover of a manuscript Mass by Cunha

The Holy Week responsories offer the clearest examples of Cunha's handwriting. The Orquestra Ribeiro Bastos holds autograph scores (Note: In musicology, an autograph manuscript is one written in the composer's own hand. The word does not mean merely that the composer signed it.) for the three offices, together with parts copied by Francisco José das Chagas, Martiniano Ribeiro Bastos and other musicians. Bass parts from the same cycle are kept by the Orquestra Lira Sanjoanense.

The Novena de Nossa Senhora da Boa Morte is preserved in parts copied by Francisco de Paula Miranda and Hermenegildo José de Souza Trindade. One group, dated 1839, contains the hymn Assumptionem Virginis Mariae and the antiphon Maria Mater gratiae. Another group may contain writing by Cunha, though this cannot be confirmed.

No manuscript of the Missa Grande in Cunha's hand has been found. The material kept by the Orquestra Ribeiro Bastos was copied by Francisco José das Chagas, Martiniano Ribeiro Bastos and unidentified musicians.

The Missa e Credo a Cinco Vozes reached Rio de Janeiro and São João del-Rei in different forms. The score held by the Metropolitan Chapter carries Cunha's signature and dedication to Pedro I, but the music itself was copied by someone else. It is a signed presentation score, not a manuscript written throughout by Cunha. The parts used in São João del-Rei were copied by Presciliano José da Silva, Francisco de Paula Miranda, José Maria Xavier, Desidério Antônio de Jesus Silva, Francisco José das Chagas and Martiniano Ribeiro Bastos. One copy of the Credo carries the dates 1841 and 1885.

The Pange lingua is known from a single copy made by Francisco José das Chagas in 1837. It bears Cunha's name, but no other copy or manuscript in his hand has been found, so its authorship remains uncertain.

Manuscript sources for Cunha's works
Work or group	Manuscript basis	Repository and shelfmark	Copyists and dates	Source status
Holy Week responsories	Autograph scores and later performing parts	Orquestra Ribeiro Bastos, 192.1/e9p5 BRMGSJ RB PUCRJ-23; Orquestra Lira Sanjoanense, OLS0208–OLS0210; BRMGSJ LS PUCRJ-04	Cunha, Francisco José das Chagas, Martiniano Ribeiro Bastos and unidentified copyists	Scores in Cunha's hand are extant, together with later performing parts.
Novena de Nossa Senhora da Boa Morte	Parts dated 1839 and a second group with possible autograph writing	Orquestra Lira Sanjoanense, OLS0133; BRMGSJ LS PUCRJ-09	Francisco de Paula Miranda and Hermenegildo José de Souza Trindade	Cunha is named as composer. Some handwriting may be his.
Missa Grande	Performing parts, with no known autograph	Orquestra Ribeiro Bastos, 89–90	Francisco José das Chagas, Martiniano Ribeiro Bastos and unidentified copyists	The manuscript set names Cunha as composer, but no source in his hand has been found.
Missa e Credo a Cinco Vozes	Signed presentation score in Rio de Janeiro and later performing parts in São João del-Rei	Metropolitan Chapter of Rio de Janeiro, CRI-SM82; Orquestra Lira Sanjoanense, OLS0188 and OLS0383; BRMGSJ AV PUCRJ-19 and BRMGSJ LS PUCRJ-04/19	Unidentified Rio copyist, Presciliano José da Silva, Francisco de Paula Miranda, José Maria Xavier, Desidério Antônio de Jesus Silva, Francisco José das Chagas and Martiniano Ribeiro Bastos	Cunha signed the Rio score, but its musical text is in another hand. The Minas Gerais material consists of later performing parts.
Pange lingua	One later copy	Orquestra Lira Sanjoanense, OLS0367; BRMGSJ AV PUCRJ-19	Francisco José das Chagas, 1837	Cunha is named as composer in a single later copy. The authorship remains uncertain.

Cunha's music also formed part of the working library of Lourenço José Fernandes Braziel, a musician active in São João del-Rei. The division of Braziel's estate after his death in 1831 included five entries under Cunha's name. They comprised a five-voice Credo, Holy Week Matins, a Mass, a Mass with large orchestra and a novena.

Braziel's son-in-law João Leocádio do Nascimento had studied with him from childhood and sang and played in his ensemble. João Leocádio asked to receive scores and instruments from the estate so that he could continue working as a musician. Hermenegildo José de Souza Trindade and João José da Silva Vieira assessed the material before it was divided among the heirs.

Braziel's pupils and their families continued to copy music in São João del-Rei. Some of this material later entered the archives of the town's orchestras. The manuscripts named in his estate cannot be matched securely with the copies now held by the Orquestra Ribeiro Bastos and the Orquestra Lira Sanjoanense. The dated parts made after 1831 must have come from other exemplars or from manuscripts whose path is unknown.

=== Musical style ===
Cunha's larger works move between choral passages and solo writing. Arias, recitatives, duets and trios divide the text into sections with their own tempos and instrumental settings. The vocal lines often use a cantabile manner (Note: Cantabile is Italian for "singable". In music, it calls for a smooth, flowing and lyrical manner of performance.) and can require a wide range, long phrases and agile passagework.

The Missa Grande is a missa brevis (Note: Missa brevis is Latin for "short Mass". It is a shortened musical setting of the fixed texts of the Mass. In this work, Cunha set the Kyrie and Gloria.) made up of the Kyrie and Gloria. Its Kyrie opens with choral writing, while the Gloria is divided among choruses and solo movements. The Laudamus is a soprano aria with an exposed horn part. The Domine Deus is written as a trio for soprano, tenor and bass. In the Qui tollis, soprano and alto move through an adagio, a recitative and an andante. The Cum Sancto Spiritu closes the work with fugato writing. (Note: Fugato means that a passage is written in the manner of a fugue, with the same musical idea entering in different voices one after another. It does not necessarily mean that the whole movement is a strict fugue.)

The solo movements ask for skills more readily found in opera than in simpler church repertory. The soprano part of the Laudamus has quick runs, leaps and a high register. The horn moves chromatically and enters into dialogue with the voice. The Qui tollis gives its singers melismatic phrases and abrupt changes of tempo and manner.

Wind instruments often carry material of their own instead of doubling the voices or filling out the harmony. Clarinet solos, chromatic horn passages and violin writing in a high register occur in the Masses and responsories. These parts required players with secure technique and gave the instrumental ensemble an active part in the shape of each movement.

The Minas Gerais copies of the Missa e Credo a Cinco Vozes call for five vocal parts, strings, one flute, one clarinet, two horns and bass. The Rio de Janeiro score uses a larger ensemble with paired flutes and clarinets, trumpets, bassoons, trombone and timpani. The São João del-Rei parts use forces closer to those available to the town's church orchestras.

Writers have used the terms operatic, Italianate, Classical, galant (Note: The galant style favored clear melodies, lighter textures and regular phrases. It spread widely through European and Atlantic music during the eighteenth century.) and pre-Romantic for Cunha's music. Aluízio José Viegas drew attention to bel canto writing, (Note: Bel canto is Italian for "beautiful singing". The term refers to a vocal manner that values smooth tone, flexible phrasing and technical control.) clarinet solos, chromatic horn passages and high violin parts. Edilson Rocha examined the Missa Grande through late eighteenth-century Classicism and Italian opera.

These labels fit passages in individual works, but they do not establish where Cunha studied or when he acquired his musical language. His training remains unknown. The 2025 reassessment also cautions against arranging music from Minas Gerais into a fixed sequence of European Baroque, Classical and Romantic styles. Cunha's manuscripts contain traits heard across the Portuguese and Brazilian Atlantic at the turn of the nineteenth century, but the route by which he learned them has not been established.

=== Works ===
Catalogue totals vary because the three Holy Week offices may be counted separately and the Missa e Credo a Cinco Vozes may be divided into its two large blocks. The grouping below follows the five-part arrangement used in the 2025 reassessment.

Group	Contents	Liturgical use	Scoring	Editions and recordings
Holy Week responsories	Responsories for Wednesday of Holy Week, titled Ofício de Quarta-feira Santa in the manuscripts; Responsories for Thursday of Holy Week, titled Ofício de Quinta-feira Santa; Responsories for Friday of Holy Week, titled Ofício de Sexta-feira Santa	The nocturnal offices of the final three days of Holy Week	Four-part chorus, two violins, viola, flute, clarinet, two horns and bass	The Wednesday responsories were edited by Rafael Sales Arantes in 2022.
Novena de Nossa Senhora da Boa Morte	The known movements include Assumptionem Virginis Mariae, Maria Mater gratiae, Veni Sancte Spiritus and Domine ad adjuvandum	Novena for Our Lady of the Good Death	Voices with violins, viola, flute, clarinet, horns and bass	Assumptionem Virginis Mariae and Maria Mater gratiae were published as Hino e Antífona de Nossa Senhora in the Funarte collection Música Sacra Mineira.
Missa Grande	Kyrie and Gloria	Mass Ordinary	Four-part chorus, soprano, alto, tenor and bass soloists, flute, two clarinets, two horns, two violins, viola and bass	Edilson Rocha prepared a performing version used in Salvador in 2004 and a later reduction for choir and piano.
Missa e Credo a Cinco Vozes	Kyrie, Gloria, Credo, Sanctus, Benedictus and Agnus Dei	Festive Mass Ordinary	Five vocal parts and soloists with strings, flute, clarinet, two horns and bass in the Minas Gerais copies. The Rio score adds paired flutes and clarinets, trumpets, bassoons, trombone and timpani	Published in the fourth volume of Patrimônio Arquivístico-Musical Mineiro in 2011 and recorded by the Orquestra Ribeiro Bastos under José Maria Neves in 1981.
Pange lingua	Hymn for bass solo	Procession for the transfer of the Blessed Sacrament	Bass solo, violins, viola, flutes, clarinets, horns and bass	

== Reception and legacy ==
=== Nineteenth-century circulation ===
Cunha's music was copied and performed in São João del-Rei while he was living elsewhere and after his death. No contract for paid work as a musician has been found, yet his Masses, responsories and novena passed from one group of performers to the next through handwritten scores and parts. They were used especially during Holy Week and the novena of Nossa Senhora da Boa Morte.

Copies bear dates across much of the century. Francisco José das Chagas copied the Pange lingua attributed to Cunha in 1837. Francisco de Paula Miranda and Hermenegildo José de Souza Trindade copied music from the Novena de Nossa Senhora da Boa Morte in 1839. Chagas copied a Credo a Cinco Vozes in 1841, and Martiniano Ribeiro Bastos worked on the same manuscript set in 1885.

Works by José Maria Xavier, composed from about 1870, gradually took Cunha's place in parts of the local church repertory. His name remained familiar to the musicians of the Orquestra Lira Sanjoanense. In 1889, its conductor, Luiz Baptista Lopes, included Cunha on the orchestra's new banner among the composers whose music it performed.

The Orquestra Lira Sanjoanense and the Orquestra Ribeiro Bastos kept the scores and performing parts used by their musicians. These holdings made possible the cataloging, microfilming, editions and concerts that returned Cunha's music to wider attention in the twentieth century.

=== Editions, recordings and modern performances ===
The Ciclo do Ouro project microfilmed music manuscripts in São João del-Rei from March to September 1976. An exhibition held for the bicentenary of the Lira Sanjoanense from 1976 into 1977 included a panel on Cunha as one of thirteen composer panels.

On 21 April 1981, the Orquestra Ribeiro Bastos gave the first complete modern performance of the Missa e Credo a Cinco Vozes in Ouro Preto under José Maria Neves. The concert was repeated days later at the former cathedral in Rio de Janeiro. Tacape issued the Ouro Preto performance on LP as volume 4 of Série Memória Musical.

In 2000, Funarte published the hymn Assumptionem Virginis Mariae and the antiphon Maria Mater gratiae, from the Novena de Nossa Senhora da Boa Morte, under the title Hino e Antífona de Nossa Senhora. The pieces were printed in the second edition of Música sacra mineira.

In 2004, Edilson Rocha conducted a revised version of the Missa Grande in Salvador with the Orquestra Sinfônica and Madrigal of the Federal University of Bahia.

The fourth volume of Patrimônio Arquivístico-Musical Mineiro was published in 2011 and devoted entirely to the Missa e Credo a Cinco Vozes. Paulo Castagna coordinated the volume, and Castagna and Fernando Binder prepared the musicological edition. (Note: A musicological edition compares the available manuscripts, explains the editors' decisions and presents a score based as closely as possible on the surviving material.) It contains the complete score, notes on the manuscripts and editorial choices, and separate vocal and instrumental parts.

Funarte included Cunha in the first digital volume of Música Sacra Mineira, released in December 2020 with scores and separate instrumental parts. Musica Brasilis provides the PAMM edition of the Missa e Credo a Cinco Vozes and a score of Hino e Antífona de Nossa Senhora prepared by Carlos Alberto Figueiredo from a manuscript of the Lira Sanjoanense.

The International Music Score Library Project provides a 293-page scan of manuscript CRI-SM82 from the Metropolitan Chapter of Rio de Janeiro. Its files also include the PAMM score, separate parts, a vocal score and a 2020 edition by Rafael Sales Arantes.

=== Symphonia Colonialis ===
Cunha's name and music were used in the 1991 film Symphonia Colonialis, written by Georg Brintrup and Fábio de Araújo and directed by Brintrup. The film follows the Orquestra Ribeiro Bastos in São João del-Rei and tells the imagined life of Antônio Francisco da Cunha, an enslaved boy who gains his freedom through music and becomes a composer.

Antônio Francisco da Cunha is fictional. His story combines episodes from the lives of José Maurício Nunes Garcia, João de Deus de Castro Lobo, José Joaquim Emerico Lobo de Mesquita, Ignácio Parreiras Neves, Marcos Coelho Neto, Francisco Gomes da Rocha and Antônio dos Santos Cunha. The soundtrack uses music by Cunha and seven other composers.

== See also ==
- Art music in colonial Brazil, sacred and secular composition during the colonial period
- Early music revival, modern recovery and performance of music from earlier periods
- Baroque in Brazil, the arts of colonial Brazil and their close relationship with the Catholic Church
- List of Brazilian composers, composers from the colonial period to the present
