= Musica Nova =

Musica Nova (Latin for "New Music") may refer to:

== Publications and compositions ==
- Musica Nova a musical collection Venice, 1540, with ricercars of Julio Segni and others
- Musica Nova (Venice 1559), Adrian Willaert's own collection of motets and madrigals published by Antonio Gardano

== Festivals and forums ==
- Frau musica nova, a conference held in November 1998 in Cologne, Germany
- Musica Nova Prize in Prague
- Pro Musica Nova, musical forum and Bremen radio festival founded by Hans Otte
- Musica Nova Festival, Glasgow, directed by Matthias Bamert
- Grupo Música Nova Brazilian modernist movement and festival founded by Gilberto Mendes
- Musica Nova, 1989, a later Brazilian modernist group founded by Marisa Rezende
- Musica Nova Editions of Brazil. directed by Marlos Nobre
- Musica Nova, program on Dutch Radio 4 presented by Ton Hartsuiker
- Musica Nova - Sofia, international festival founded by Georgi Tutev
- Musica nova sacra, Frank Michael Beyer

== Ensembles ==
- Musica Nova chamber orchestra in Bucharest founded by Hilda Jerea
- Musica Nova (French ensemble), led by Lucien Kandel
