= Colonial Symphony =

- Directed by: Georg Brintrup
- Written by: Georg Brintrup
- Produced by: Swantja Ehrentreich; Brintrup Filmproduktion; HR, Frankfurt; SWF / SWR
- Starring: Elder G. da Silva Santos; Luiz António Rodrigues; Ivan Capua; Cynara Bruno
- Cinematography: Luigi Verga; Eva Piccoli
- Edited by: Jorge Alvis
- Release dates: 1 October 1991 (Germany); 25 October 1991 (São Paulo International Film Festival)
- Running time: 60 minutes
- Country: Brazil
- Languages: Portuguese, Italian

Colonial Symphony is a 1991 German/Brazilian film directed by Georg Brintrup. The film recounts a largely unknown phenomenon which started in the 18th century regarding Brazilian classical music. Nearly all Brazilian classical composers were mulattoes, who, if they could prove their talent in composing music, could gain their freedom from slavery. This film explores the boundaries between a music documentary and a fictional biography.

== Plot ==
A box of documents dating back to the 18th century has been found in the archives of the Orquestra Ribeiro Bastos. At that time, Brazil was still a Portuguese colony. A young musicologist who was called to examine the documents (actor: Ivan Capua) travels to the town of São João del Rei, in the Brazilian province of Minas Gerais, where the orchestra is based. Today the Orquestra Ribeiro Bastos is the only remaining mulatto orchestra in Brazil. Its tradition dates back more than two hundred years. As in the past, the orchestra now is still mainly composed of mulatto musicians, most of them amateurs.

From the documents we learn that some members of an opera company travelled from Naples to Brazil to perform Giovanni Paisiello's "Nina, pazza per amore". They describe their journey and tell of their collaboration with a Brazilian composer named Antônio Francisco da Cunha (actor: Luiz António Rodrigues), a mulatto from São João del Rei. Due to his musical talent, as a boy (actor: Elder G. da Silva Santos), Antônio had been able to take advantage of a law of Minas Gerais, which permitted him to obtain the "carta do alforia", a letter that guaranteed him freedom from slavery. Admitted as a member of a brotherhood of former slaves, the young Antônio Francisco da Cunha had the opportunity to perfect his talent and become one of the most important composers of Baroque music in the State of Minas Gerais.

Documents also reveal that the composer cultivated a close friendship with the poet Claudio Manuel Rezende, a supporter of the underground independence movement "Inconfidencia Mineira", which also fought for the abolition of slavery. Antônio Francisco was accused of sympathizing with the movement because he gave his friend safety in his home. The poet was captured and hanged, while Antônio Francisco, thanks to his fame, was granted amnesty. However, the thought of being dependent on the Portuguese crown like a slave, despite having been freed, left him with no peace of mind. He retired and, recalling his humble origins, composed his famous Te Deum. Music became for him the only true path to freedom.

== Cast ==
- Elder G. da Silva Santos: young Antonio Francisco da Cunha
- Luiz António Rodrigues: old Antônio Francisco da Cunha
- Ivan Capua: musicologist
- José Maria Neves: conductor / Ingácio Marcos Coutinho
- Luis d’Angelo Pugliese: João da Rocha
- Luciano Mauricio: Claudio Manuel Rezende
- Roberto Diano: grandfather
- Cynara Bruno: Giuditta Patti

== Production ==
The Brazilian premiere of the film Colonial Symphony was on 25 October 1991 during the 15th São Paulo International Film Festival São Paulo International Film Festival The first television broadcast of this film in Germany was on 1 October 1991 on SWF / SWR. The film was also screened in Lecce, Italy, during the "Festival del XVIII secolo" on 25 May 2010.

== Soundtrack ==
The film’s Soundtrack is made up of excerpts from the following musical compositions:

Titolo	Compositore	Opera
1.	João de Deus de Castro Lobo	Missa e Credo a oito vozes: Credo, Kyrie, Sanctus
2.	Lobo de Mesquita	Missa em Fá n. 2 / Missa em mi bemolle n. 1
3.	Ignácio Parreiras Neves	Credo
4.	Marcos Coelho Neto	Maria Mater Gratias
5.	José Maurício Nunes Garcia	Missa de Requiem
6.	Antônio dos Santos Cunha	Matinas de Sexta-feira Santa
7.	José Maria Xavier	Matinas de Natal, 2nd Notturno e 3rd Notturno
8.	Giovanni Paisiello	Nina, o sia La pazza per Amore
