= Marcos Coelho Neto =

Brazilian composer and musician (died 1823)

- Born: 1763 or c. 1776; Vila Rica, Captaincy of Minas Gerais, Colonial Brazil
- Died: 1823
- Occupations: Conductor; horn player; trumpet player

Marcos Coelho Neto (born 1763 or c. 1776; died 1823), also spelled Marcos Coelho Netto and often called Marcos Coelho Neto Filho to distinguish him from his namesake father, was a Brazilian composer, conductor and instrumentalist. He spent his career in Vila Rica, the capital of the Captaincy of Minas Gerais, where he played the horn, clarion and trumpet.

Coelho Neto and his father took part in the royal festivities of 1786 at the Casa da Ópera. By 1804 the son was a trumpeter in the First Militia Regiment, while his father served as the regiment's timpanist. He belonged to the brotherhoods of São José dos Homens Pardos and Nossa Senhora das Mercês de Cima, playing for their ceremonies and repeatedly directing the novena and feast of Saint Joseph. In 1812, he joined thirty other musicians in a petition to found a brotherhood of Saint Cecilia and curb demands for unpaid performances. He won Vila Rica's municipal music contracts in 1814 and 1815, directing the singers and instrumentalists hired for public ceremonies.

Much of the sacred music bearing the name Marcos Coelho Neto cannot be assigned securely to either father or son. The repertory comprises the 1787 hymn Maria Mater Gratiae, settings of the Litany of Loreto in C, D and F, the antiphons Salve Regina and Crucem Tuam, and responsories for Saint Anthony. These works generally use four vocal parts with strings, bass and pairs of wind instruments. Analyses of individual pieces find Baroque, galant and Classical elements in their vocal writing, harmony and form. Handwriting analysis favors the son for much of the repertory, though some scholars assign individual works to the father or leave the question open.

The music returned to performance through Francisco Curt Lange's work in Minas Gerais between 1944 and 1946. Among the manuscripts he collected was the autograph score of Maria Mater Gratiae, dated 1787 and now held by the Museu da Inconfidência. Lange published the hymn in 1951, followed by performances in Argentina and Brazil and a recording made at the Theatro Municipal in Rio de Janeiro in 1958. Further scores, performances and recordings have expanded the available repertory while leaving the division of the works between father and son unsettled.

== Life and career ==
=== Family and identity ===
Marcos Coelho Neto was born in Vila Rica, then the capital of the Captaincy of Minas Gerais, but his exact birth date is unknown. Francisco Curt Lange reported a baptismal record from 1763 for the elder Marcos Coelho Neto's firstborn son, and that date was subsequently adopted in catalogues and institutional editions. The 1804 census of Vila Rica, however, lists the younger musician as aged 28, suggesting that he was born around 1776. The discrepancy remains unresolved, and 1763–1823 continues to be the date range most commonly used for him.

Reconstructing his biography is complicated by the fact that his father, also a musician in Vila Rica, had the same name. The 1804 census is one of the few documents that clearly distinguishes them: Coelho Neto, aged 28, appears as a trumpeter in the First Militia Regiment, while his 58-year-old father served as its timpanist. Because they worked for some of the same institutions, many records identify them only as “Marcos Coelho Neto”. Historians therefore conventionally distinguish them as pai and filho (“father” and “son”), although “Marcos Coelho Neto Filho” was not a form consistently used during the younger musician's lifetime. The spelling Coelho Netto also appears in the sources. The same ambiguity affects the musical manuscripts, and the authorship of several compositions remains disputed.

Like his father, Coelho Neto belonged to the brotherhoods of São José dos Homens Pardos and Nossa Senhora das Mercês de Cima. Lange relied chiefly on this association when describing the two musicians as mulattos, but more recent research has cautioned that membership in a brotherhood is not, by itself, sufficient evidence of ancestry. The surviving documentation does not permit a more precise account of Coelho Neto's family background, nor does it support the claim, repeated in some modern sources, that his father had formerly been enslaved.

=== Professional activity in Vila Rica ===
Coelho Neto first appears clearly in the municipal records in 1785, when a roster of musicians identifies him as the second horn player alongside his father, who played first horn. The following year he performed as second clarion in Vila Rica's royal festivities. He returned as second horn in 1789 and 1791 and as second clarion for a Te Deum in 1792. Two further undated rosters from the closing years of the eighteenth century also list him among the horn players. These records show that he played the horn, clarion and trumpet, identified in contemporary Portuguese sources as trompa, clarim and trombeta.

For its annual festivals and extraordinary celebrations, the Senate of the Chamber hired musicians through public auctions. The winning contractor was responsible for assembling the singers and instrumentalists and providing the music required for each occasion. Before securing contracts in his own name, Coelho Neto performed in ensembles organized by other music directors.

One such occasion was the series of festivities held in May 1786 to celebrate the marriages between the Portuguese and Spanish royal families. The program at the Casa da Ópera included three operas and two dramas. An expense statement dated 29 December records payments for the orchestra, music copying and instruction, performers, costumes, lighting, scenery and stage machinery. Marcos Coelho and his son jointly received five oitavas and twelve vinténs of gold, but the document does not state how the payment was divided or what role the younger Coelho Neto performed. The record confirms his participation in the theatre ensemble, but does not indicate that he held a permanent position at the Casa da Ópera or directed its productions.

In 1804, Coelho Neto appears in the Vila Rica census as a trumpeter in the First Militia Regiment. In August 1812, he was the second of thirty-one “professors of the art of music” to sign a petition seeking permission to establish a Brotherhood of Saint Cecilia at the parish church of Ouro Preto. The musicians hoped to protect themselves from frequent demands for unpaid performances. His professional standing was firmly established by 1814 and 1815, when he won Vila Rica's municipal music contracts. He received 56$000 réis in each year and, as conductor, was responsible for assembling and preparing the musicians for the festivities sponsored by the Senate of the Chamber.

Coelho Neto's career as an instrumentalist and conductor is easier to trace than his work as a composer. Because the manuscripts identify their composer only as “Marcos Coelho Neto”, it is not always possible to determine which of the two musicians wrote them. Paulo Castagna attributes the sacred compositions bearing that name to the son, whereas Harry Crowl assigns them to the father and Sílvio Crespo Filho regards the 1787 Himno a 4 as a work of the elder musician.

=== Brotherhoods and religious music ===
Coelho Neto belonged to the Brotherhood of São José dos Homens Pardos and the Brotherhood of Nossa Senhora das Mercês de Cima. He played horn and clarion for the two associations. At São José he was engaged eight times as regent for the novena and feast of the patron saint, the highest total among the sixteen regents hired from 1759 to 1815. These agreements were normally made orally at meetings of the administrative board, whose minutes often omitted the regent's name.

The feast combined a novena with Eucharistic exposition on 19 March. Before the brotherhood's income declined after 1819, music for the novena and feast normally cost between 20 and 35 oitavas of gold, divided between the regent and his ensemble. The chapel also hired musicians for the feast of Nossa Senhora do Parto, whose image stood at a side altar.

São José joined religious patronage to professional and social ties. Musicians made up about one fifth of the members whose occupations are known, and 55 musicians held office or sat on the administrative board between 1727 and 1822. Coelho Neto's own circle can be traced in the approval of composer Francisco Gomes da Rocha's will in 1809. Coelho Neto and Caetano Rodrigues da Silva the younger served as witnesses. The executor and the third witness were also members of São José.

In August 1812 Coelho Neto joined Florêncio José Ferreira Coutinho, João de Deus de Castro Lobo and other professional musicians in a petition to establish a brotherhood dedicated to Saint Cecilia at the parish church of Nossa Senhora do Pilar. The petition sought to curb unpaid performances in private oratories, churches, funerals and other ceremonies with music. The brotherhood's statutes of 1815 repeated this restriction, but Prince Regent João removed the clause that would have prohibited free services at private ceremonies. The Brotherhood of Santa Cecília moved to a side altar at São José in 1823 after its members stated that most of them also belonged to São José.

=== Later years and death ===
Coelho Neto was married to Joana Teixeira da Silva and taught music to her son, João Antônio Teixeira Rijo. Rijo later earned income as a musician. By 1823 Coelho Neto had become mentally incapacitated, and a notice requiring an inventory of his estate was issued that year. He died in 1823.

== Music ==
=== Sacred repertory and liturgical function ===
The compositions connected with the name Marcos Coelho Neto form a sacred repertory setting Latin texts. They include the Marian hymn Maria Mater Gratiae, the antiphons Salve Regina and Crucem Tuam, litanies in C, D and F, and responsories for Saint Anthony.

Maria Mater Gratiae, dated 29 November 1787, is written for four vocal parts with violins, viola, horns and bass. Its two stanzas ask Mary to protect the faithful from the enemy and receive them at the hour of death, then offer a doxology to Christ, the Father and the Holy Spirit. The litanies set the Litany of Loreto. Such settings formed part of novenas, paraliturgical observances held for nine days in preparation for a saint's feast. The C-major litany calls for four vocal parts, two oboes, two horns, two violins, viola and bass. The D-major litany uses four vocal parts, two horns, two violins, viola and double bass.

Salve Regina belongs to the Marian antiphon repertory. Crucem Tuam sets a text for the adoration of the Cross on Good Friday, while the responsories dated 1799 concern devotion to Saint Anthony.

This music was performed by compact professional groups rather than permanent orchestras in the modern sense. In eighteenth-century Minas Gerais, a usual companhia de música or partido de música joined four vocal parts, sometimes doubled, to strings, bass and pairs of flutes, oboes or horns. Brotherhoods and municipal senates hired music masters to assemble these groups, compose for religious feasts and provide music for ceremonies connected with the Portuguese court. The Latin works themselves retained a religious function even when their performers also worked in theatre, military and municipal ceremonies.

=== Musical style and performance practice ===
The orchestral introduction of Maria Mater Gratiae supplies the work's principal motives. These return in the violins, connect vocal phrases and help bind the short setting together. The alto begins the first choral passage in concertato dialogue with the other voices, followed by predominantly homophonic writing. The tonal plan moves from B minor to its relative major, D major, and through G major before returning to B minor. Sílvio Crespo Filho characterized the work's expression, harmonic sequences and orchestral thematic writing as Baroque, while finding Classical traits in its balanced phrases, symmetrical tonal plan and thematic development.

The C-major Ladainha de Nossa Senhora a quatro, provisionally assigned to the younger Coelho Neto, also uses concertato writing. Full choral passages alternate with solos and duets. An instrumental introduction and interludes carry tonal transitions, while recurring motives range from diatonic to more chromatic writing. The tonal course reaches B-flat major and C minor from its main centre of C major. Horns sound through much of the piece, giving it the informal title Ladainha das trompas, or “Litany of the Horns”.

The D-major litany has 196 measures divided into four movements: an Allegro, a six-measure Largo molto, an extended Andante levado and a closing Allegro. The division follows the prayer's structure. The first movement sets the Kyrie and invocations of the Trinity, the second introduces “Sancta Maria”, the third contains the Marian titles and the fourth sets the Agnus Dei. In the third movement, invocations and the repeated “ora pro nobis” pass through sectional solos, duets, homorhythmic choral writing, unison passages, ostinatos and cadences. At times different vocal lines sing the invocation and response simultaneously, loosening the literary pattern of the prayer.

No single period label describes this repertory adequately. Musicologists have identified late-Baroque, Rococo, galant and Classical traits in the church music of Minas Gerais. Continuo writing, sequences and solo display can stand beside homophonic choruses, balanced phrase structures and Classical tonal planning. In the works studied here, concertato contrasts and recurring orchestral motives coexist with compact forms and clear tonal organization. Their vocal and instrumental forces also match the small companies documented elsewhere in the mining towns.

=== Manuscripts, transmission and attribution ===
The autograph of Maria Mater Gratiae is catalogued as MI-FCLange 036 in the Museu da Inconfidência in Ouro Preto. It bears the composer's name and the date 1787. Much of the music from colonial Minas circulated as separate vocal and instrumental parts rather than full scores. A signature on such material can indicate ownership instead of authorship. Copyists could alter instrumentation to fit available players, shorten liturgical sections or add instrumental introductions and endings. An inscription on a title page cannot settle authorship without handwriting, paper and musical comparison.

The C-major litany has an unusually detailed transmission history. The source used in its first modern scoring belonged to the private collection of Aluizio José Viegas and drew upon copies by Presciliano Silva and other musicians. Parts in the archive of the Pão de Santo Antônio in Diamantina were copied by Francisco Bazílio da Silva Ribeiro in 1872, an unidentified copyist in 1874, Modesto Antônio Ferreira in 1891 and Josephino Ribeiro Pistom in 1896. Ribeiro's title page names Marcos Coelho Neto and lists four voices, two violins, oboes, horns and basses. Aluizio José Viegas and Geraldo Barbosa prepared the original modern score.

The 2020 FUNARTE score is a practical edition rather than a critical one. It was prepared from electronic files made by José Staneck in 1997 and from earlier editions. The editors did not have direct access to the manuscripts and describe their reconstruction as conjectural, without a critical apparatus. Curt Lange had published Maria Mater Gratiae in the first volume of his Archivo de Música Religiosa de la Capitania Geral das Minas Gerais in 1951. Edusp published the D-major litany from the Museu da Inconfidência collection in 1994, followed by restored scores of Salve Regina and Crucem Tuam in 1999.

The younger musician's authorship cannot be asserted with equal confidence for every composition. Música Brasilis credits Carlos Alberto Baltazar's handwriting research with assigning the extant autograph manuscripts, and possibly most of the repertory, to the son. Other publications retain qualifications. FUNARTE identifies the C-major litany only as a work believed to be by the son, while the UFSJ study leaves the D-major litany unresolved between the two men. Crespo Filho's 1990 analysis of Maria Mater Gratiae treated its composer as the musician who died in 1806, showing how the work was formerly assigned to the father.

The funeral responsory formerly listed among Coelho Neto's works is still less secure. Its manuscript in the Vespasiano Gregório dos Santos collection carries only the title Responsório de Marcos. Márcio Miranda Pontes catalogued it under Coelho Neto, but its style differs from the other music linked with that name, and Marcelo Hazan proposed a date around the middle of the nineteenth century. Its unusual solo trumpet part prompted the suggestion that the younger Coelho Neto, a trumpet player, might have written it, but no corroborating composition or document has been identified. The work remains unassigned.

== Works ==
The father and son signed the same name, so a manuscript naming "Marcos Coelho Neto" cannot by itself be assigned to the younger musician. The final column distinguishes autograph material, manuscript copies, modern editions and works whose authorship remains unsettled.

Work	Genre or liturgical use	Scoring	Source and authorship status
Maria Mater Gratiae (1787)	Marian hymn	Four vocal parts, two violins, viola, two horns and bass	The autograph is held by the Museu da Inconfidência as MI-FCLange 036. Francisco Curt Lange assigned the work to the father. Carlos Alberto Baltazar and Régis Duprat argued that the son was the more likely composer. The question remains unresolved.
Ladainha de Nossa Senhora a quatro in C major, also called Ladainha das trompas	Litany of Loreto, intended for use during a novena	Four vocal parts, two oboes, two horns, two violins, viola and bass	The Funarte edition assigns the work provisionally to the son. Its musical text was prepared from nineteenth-century copies, including manuscripts dated 1872, 1874, 1891 and 1896.
Ladainha em Ré	Litany of Loreto	Four vocal parts, two horns, two violins, viola and double bass	The manuscript belongs to the Museu da Inconfidência collection and was published in Edusp's first volume in 1994. Carlos Alberto Baltazar coordinated the volume, Régis Duprat organized it, and the transcriptions are credited jointly to Baltazar and Conceição Resende; the publisher does not name the transcriber of the individual work. The musical source does not establish whether the father or son composed it.
Salve Regina	Marian antiphon	A 1997 recording uses a vocal ensemble, two flutes and strings.	A restored score from the Museu da Inconfidência collection was published by Edusp in 1999. The volume credits its transcriptions collectively to Carlos Alberto Baltazar, Maria Alice Volpe, Mary Angela Biason and Régis Duprat, without assigning this piece to an individual transcriber. It uses the shared name without choosing between father and son.
Crucem Tuam	Antiphon for the Adoration of the Cross on Good Friday	A 1997 recording uses two oboes, two violins and continuo.	A restored score from the Museu da Inconfidência collection was published by Edusp in 1999. The volume credits its transcriptions collectively to Carlos Alberto Baltazar, Maria Alice Volpe, Mary Angela Biason and Régis Duprat, without assigning this piece to an individual transcriber. It uses the shared name without choosing between father and son.
Domine hyssopo, also catalogued as Asperges me	Antiphon	Not stated in the catalogue	Listed without a date under the shared name; the catalogue does not decide whether the father or son composed it.
Ladainha em Fá	Litany of Loreto	Not stated in the catalogue	Listed without a date under the shared name; the catalogue does not decide whether the father or son composed it.
Responsórios de Santo Antônio (1799 and undated set)	Responsories for Saint Anthony	Not stated in the catalogue	The catalogue lists one set dated 1799 and another without a date. Neither is securely divided between father and son.
Responsório fúnebre, also catalogued as Responsório para encomendação de defuntos	Responsory for the rites of the dead	Four vocal parts, flute, clarinet, saxophone, trumpet, two horns, ophicleide and strings	The manuscript in the Vespasiano Gregório dos Santos collection is headed only "De Marcos". Its part set includes saxophone and ophicleide. Marcelo Hazan proposed a mid-nineteenth-century date, and the work's authorship remains doubtful.

== Rediscovery and reception ==
=== Twentieth-century rediscovery ===
Coelho Neto’s modern rediscovery began with Francisco Curt Lange's work in Minas Gerais from 1944 to 1946. Lange gathered music papers in Ouro Preto and other towns for the collection that bears his name. The collection contains the autograph score of Maria Mater Gratiae, dated 1787 and catalogued as MI-FCLange 036. His first long treatment of music from the region, "La música en Minas Gerais: un informe preliminar", was published in the sixth volume of the Boletín Latino-Americano de Música in 1946.

In 1951 Lange edited Maria Mater Gratiae for the first printed anthology devoted to eighteenth-century music from Minas Gerais, Archivo de música religiosa de la "Capitania Geral das Minas Gerais". Published by the National University of Cuyo in Mendoza, the volume paired Coelho Neto's hymn with works by Francisco Gomes da Rocha and José Joaquim Emerico Lobo de Mesquita. Lange prepared the hymn for four voices, violins, viola, horn and bass, and supplied biographical notes in his preface, "La música en Minas Gerais en el siglo XVIII". He returned to the two homonymous musicians in the 1968 continuation of "La música en Villa Rica". One municipal roll reproduced there names the horn players "Marcos Coelho Pay ou Freire" and "Marcos Coelho Filho", keeping the father and son separate.

The 1958 concerts brought criticism of Lange's custody of the papers and of the changes made in his "restorations". The dispute, known as the Curt Lange affair, ran in Brazilian newspapers and musicological writing until 1983. The manuscript collection entered the Museu da Inconfidência in 1983, when the museum created its musicology section under Régis Duprat. Duprat and Carlos Alberto Baltazar catalogued its Minas Gerais composers in 1991. Carlos Alberto Figueiredo classifies Lange's 1951 score as a practical performing edition: it adds dynamics, articulation and other directions, but does not name its manuscript source or supply a critical apparatus. Lange assigned Maria Mater Gratiae to the elder Marcos Coelho Neto. Baltazar and Duprat's handwriting study favoured the son, while Suzel Ana Reily cautions that the shared name still prevents a conclusive assignment.

=== Editions, performances and recordings ===
Performances followed the 1951 publication. The three works in Lange's anthology were given at San Miguel de Tucumán on 29 April 1952. Concerts in Porto Alegre, Novo Hamburgo and São Leopoldo followed on 21–23 September. Further performances took place in Mendoza and Karlsruhe in 1955, and in Argentina on 28 September 1957. On 14 June 1958, the Brazilian Symphony Orchestra and the Associação de Canto Coral performed Maria Mater Gratiae at the Theatro Municipal in Rio de Janeiro. Cleofe Person de Mattos prepared the choir and Edoardo de Guarnieri conducted. The Festa label issued the live concert in two LP volumes. Maria Mater Gratiae was included on Mestres do Barroco Mineiro (Século XVIII), Vol. II, catalogue number LDR 5006. A CD reissue drew on the original 1958 tape.

New recordings gradually extended the selection beyond that hymn. The UFMG School of Music's symphony orchestra and choir recorded the D-major litany under Ângela Pinto Coelho for the 1990 LP A Música das Minas Gerais do Século XVIII. The Swiss-based Ensemble Turicum, directed by Luiz Alves da Silva, included Maria Mater Gratiae on the 1995 Claves album Sacred Music from 18th Century Brazil. Ars Nova, the UFMG choir conducted by Carlos Alberto Pinto Fonseca, recorded the hymn in 1996. In 1997 Brasilessentia Grupo Vocal e Orquestra, conducted by Vítor Gabriel de Araújo, recorded Salve Regina and Crucem Tuam for the Paulus album Música do Brasil Colonial: Compositores Mineiros.

Printed editions also widened the repertory available to performers. The first volume of Edusp's Música do Brasil Colonial, issued in 1994, contains the D-major litany. Carlos Alberto Baltazar coordinated the volume, Régis Duprat organized it, and Baltazar and Conceição Resende are jointly credited with the transcriptions. The second volume, issued in 1999, contains Salve Regina and Crucem Tuam, transcribed from manuscripts in the Museu da Inconfidência. The volume credits the transcriptions collectively to Baltazar, Maria Alice Volpe, Mary Angela Biason and Régis Duprat. In 2020 Funarte released a downloadable edition of the Ladainha de Nossa Senhora a 4 in the first volume of its Coleção Música Sacra Mineira, edited by Figueiredo.

== See also ==
- Chronological list of Brazilian classical composers
- Art music in Brazil
