= Grupo Música Nova =

Group of composers and instrumentalists in 1960s São Paulo

Grupo Música Nova was a group formed by young composers and instrumentalists active in São Paulo in the early 1960s. The group was based on proposals to renew the musical language by incorporating principles of experimentation, graphics, and the adoption of theatrical and visual arts elements. O Manifesto Música Nova, text that led to the formation of Grupo Música Nova, was first written by Rogério Duprat in 1961 and published in 1963 by Revista Invenção n. 3. The document was signed by composers Rogério Duprat, Gilberto Mendes, Willy Corrêa de Oliveira, Damiano Cozzella, Julio Medaglia, Régis Duprat, Sandino Hohagen, and Alexandre Pascoal. This manifesto was strongly influenced by the Concrete Poetry Movement and by the proposals contained in the Plano Piloto para Poesia Concreta (written by Augusto de Campos, Décio Pignatari, and Haroldo de Campos and published in 1958). The text of the Manifesto Música Nova was also an aesthetic position that opposed nationalism, a musical current that at the time dominated the environment of Brazilian orchestras and music schools.
