= Eduardo Mendonça =

- Born: Eduardo Mendonça; August 21, 1960; Salvador, Bahia, Brazil
- Occupations: Musician, Singer, Composer, Director
- Instruments: Guitar, Percussion, Vocals
- Member of: Show Brazil!

Eduardo Mendonça (born August 21, 1960 in Salvador, Bahia, Brazil) is a guitarist, percussionist, singer, composer, and director of "Show Brazil!".

He traces his heritage to a royal African family called "Mama Beka", meaning "Prophet of the Royal Court". He settled in Seattle, Washington in 1994 and was a member of the percussion ensemble Bakra Bata, before forming his own band and production company, Show Brazil. His group performs and offers workshops at festivals all over the Pacific Northwest, including Bumbershoot, the Northwest Folklife Festival, the Seattle International Children's Festival, and many others.

Eduardo Mendonça was on hand to provide a musical welcome to Pope John Paul II when the pontiff visited Brazil in 1980. He also played for Nelson Mandela's visit to Seattle in 1999. Mendonça was featured in Paul Simon's 1991 documentary "Born at the Right Time". In 2007 he was named Outstanding Brazilian Male Singer Based in the United States.
