= Francisco Manuel da Silva =

Brazilian songwriter and music professor

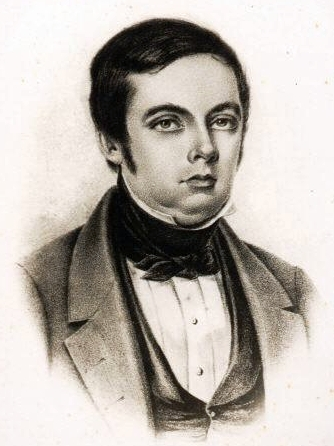
- Portrait by Luís Aleixo Boulanger
- Born: 21 February 1795; Rio de Janeiro, State of Brazil
- Died: 18 December 1865 (aged 70); Rio de Janeiro, Empire of Brazil

Francisco Manuel da Silva (21 February 1795 – 18 December 1865) was a Brazilian songwriter and music professor, notable for composing the Brazilian National Anthem.

== Biography ==
Silva was born on 21 February in Rio de Janeiro and died on 18 December 1865, at the age of 70, in the same city. He had great prominence in the musical life of Rio de Janeiro in the period between the death of José Maurício Nunes Garcia and Antônio Carlos Gomes. He was a singer of Capela Real since 1809, and later a cello player. He was one of the founders of Imperial Academia de Música e Ópera Nacional (National Imperial Music and Opera Academy), of Sociedade Beneficência Musical e Conservatório Imperial de Música, which became Instituto Nacional de Música (Nacional Music Institute) and is called Escola de Música da Universidade Federal do Rio de Janeiro (Rio de Janeiro University Music School).

He was taught by José Maurício Nunes Garcia and, most probably, by Sigismund Neukomm. He was directly responsible for Capela Imperial's reinstatement and being turned to its old beauty. He left a handful of works, spread around Rio de Janeiro, Minas Gerais and São Paulo archives, covering gospel music, modinhas and lundus.

He composed the Brazilian National Anthem, first as a patriotic march, since emperor Pedro I's abdication, later being officialized as anthem by the Brazilian Republic Revolution (1889). He also composed one opera, O prestigio da lei.
