= Willy Corrêa de Oliveira =

Brazilian modernist composer

Willy Corrêa de Oliveira (born 11 February 1938, in Recife) is a Brazilian modernist composer. He was one of the original signatories of the Grupo Música Nova's Manifesto in 1963, written by Rogério Duprat in 1963. He is also one of the founders and organizers of the Festival Música Nova, which has taken place annually since 1962.
