= Sílvio Ferraz =

Brazilian composer (born 1959)

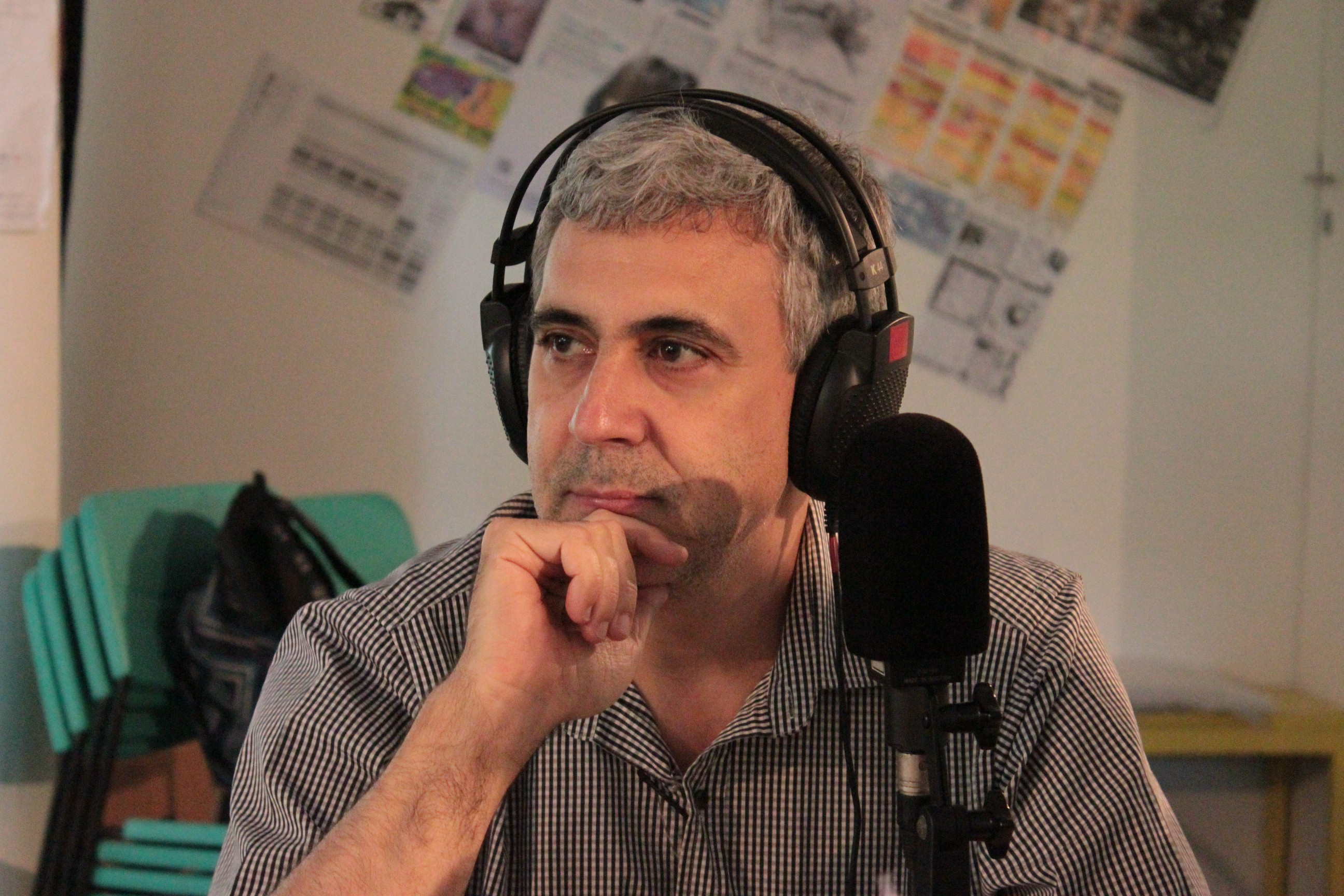
- Born: April 30, 1959 (age 67); São Paulo, Brazil
- Education: University of São Paulo, Pontifical Catholic University of São Paulo, University of Campinas
- Occupations: Composer, Professor

Sílvio Ferraz (born 1959 in São Paulo) is a Brazilian contemporary composer.

His works have been performed in Brazil and abroad. In 1993 he received two commissions from the British Council when he had the opportunity to work with the Nash Ensemble and the Smith Quartet. In 1994 two works are performed by Ensemble Contrechamps. His works have also been played by Arditti String Quartet, Champs d’Action, Iktus Ensemble and Taller de Musica Contemporanea de Chile. Among those ensembles that played his pieces are the Brazilian Grupo Novo Horizonte, Duo Diálogos, Camerata Aberta, Orquestra Municipal de São Paulo, Coral do Estado de São Paulo.

== Professional Background ==
In 1977 he entered the composition course at the University of São Paulo (USP), where he studied with Gilberto Mendes and Willy Corrêa de Oliveira. After his university studies he followed composition courses with Brian Ferneyhough and James Dillon (1994 at Royaumont Abbey, France), and Gerard Grisey and Jonathan Harvey (at the IRCAM's "Académie d'été" in 1998).

In 1997 he concluded his doctorate in Music Semiotics at the Pontifical Catholic University of S. Paulo (PUC-SP) with a thesis about the concept of difference and repetition in music according to Gilles Deleuze philosophic thought. In 2006 he passed his habilitation (“Livre Docência”) at the University of Campinas (UNICAMP) with a thesis on compositional techniques.

Since 2014, Full Professor of the Course of Composition at Universidade de São Paulo, and researcher at FAPESP (Fundação de Amparo a Ciência de S.Paulo) and CNPq (Brazilian National Council for Research). Head of the Music Department for the biennium 2019–2020 and 2021–2022.

== Bibliography ==
- Livro das sonoridades [notas dispersas sobre composição]. Rio de Janeiro: 7 Letras editor. 2004
- Música e Repetição: aspectos da diferença na música do séc. XX. S.Paulo: EDUC/Fapesp. 1997
- Notas.Atos.Gestos, Rio de Janeiro : 7 letras. 2007

== Sources ==
- Voix Nouvelle – Rouyaumont Fondation
- The Nash Ensemble
- The Smith Quartet
- Campos do Jordão International Winter Music Festival
- Escola de Música do Estado de São Paulo
- Lattes Curriculum:
- Music Department of Universidade de São Paulo:
- Musica Brasilis
