= Damião Barbosa de Araújo =

Brazilian musician (1778–1856)

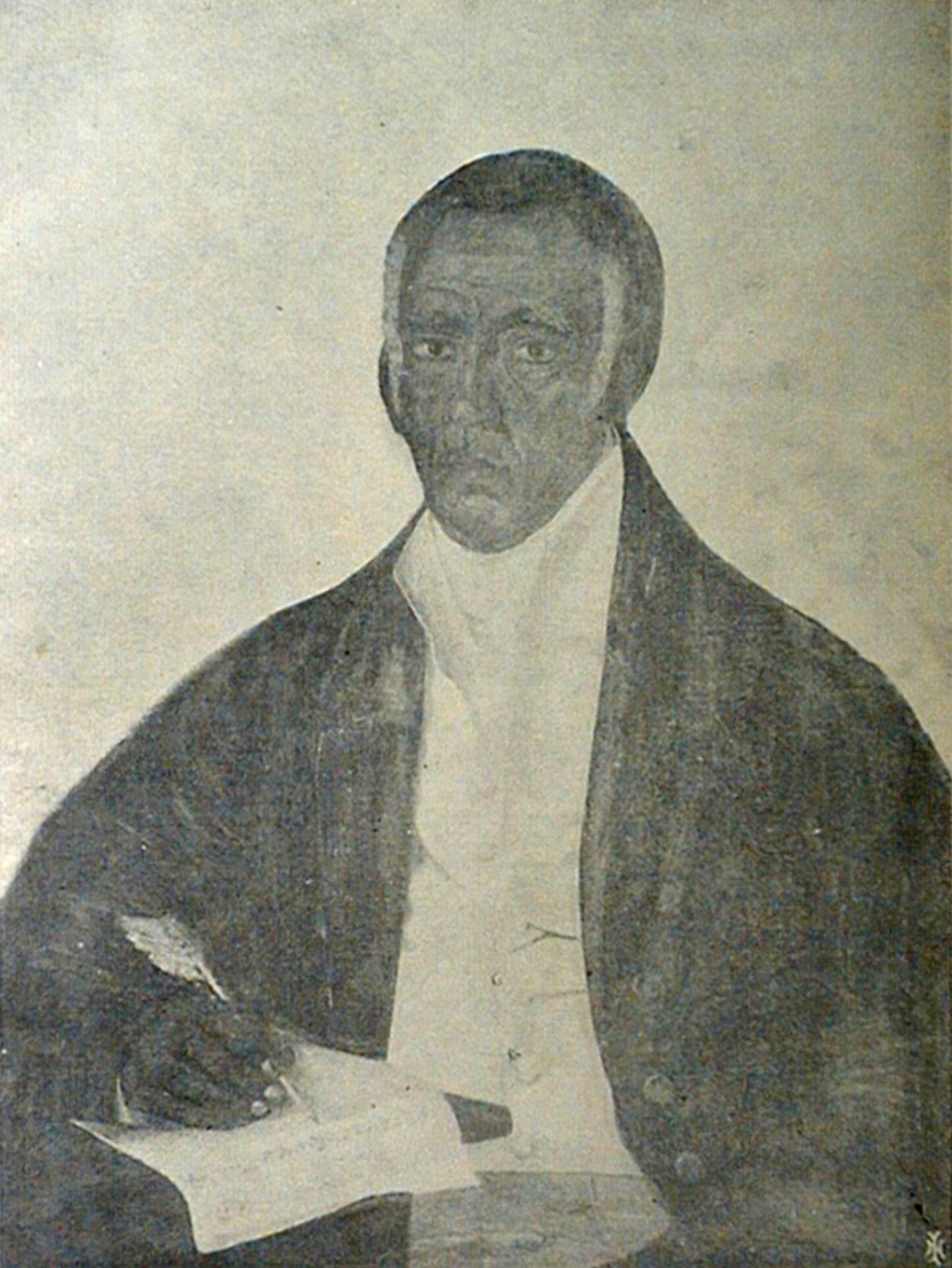

Background information
- Born: 27 September 1778; Itaparica Island, Captaincy of Bahia, State of Brazil
- Died: 20 April 1856 (aged 77) Salvador, Province of Bahia, Empire of Brazil
- Genres: Sacred music; Modinha; Lundu; Waltz
- Occupations: Composer; violinist; conductor; teacher
- Instrument: Violin

Damião Barbosa de Araújo (27 September 1778 – 20 April 1856) was a Brazilian violinist, teacher, conductor and composer.

Born on Itaparica Island, he worked in Salvador and Rio de Janeiro during the period around the transfer of the Portuguese court to Brazil, and later served as chapel master of Salvador Cathedral.

His compositions were mainly sacred vocal works, although he also wrote instrumental music, theatre music, military marches and pieces in popular genres such as modinha, lundu and waltz.

== Biography ==
Araújo was the son of Francisco Barbosa de Araújo, a shoemaker and amateur musician. He first learned music from his father and later studied with Alexandre Gonçalves da Fonseca. He became known as a violinist and performed at the old Teatro Guadalupe in Salvador, including in plays by António José da Silva, known as "the Jew". At the age of 18, he entered the 1st Line Regiment of Salvador as a soldier-musician. When Prince Regent John (Note: A prince regent rules on behalf of a monarch who is absent, incapacitated or otherwise not exercising direct rule. John governed Portugal as prince regent before becoming king.) arrived in Salvador in 1808, after the French invasion of Portugal, Araújo played before him on several occasions.

Araújo moved to Rio de Janeiro with the royal family as leader and composer of the band of the Royal Marine Brigade. He also performed with the musical corps of the Royal Chapel of Rio de Janeiro and with the Royal Chamber, (Note: The Royal Chamber was the musical body connected with private court life, distinct from the Royal Chapel's liturgical music.) a group based at the Quinta da Boa Vista palace and devoted to music for the prince's private entertainment. These appearances do not seem to have given him a stable salaried position. In the 1810s, he petitioned for employment or a pension and wrote of the poverty in which he and his family lived. In 1817, he wrote that he had performed in the chapel and chamber without any obligation beyond his obedience as a subject and love as a citizen.

In 1818, Araújo was named future successor to his former teacher Fonseca as chapel master of Salvador Cathedral. The appointment exempted him from the usual expectation that the holder of the office be a priest. In Rio de Janeiro, he also became a member of the Brotherhood of Saint Cecilia, came into contact with José Maurício Nunes Garcia and Marcos Portugal, and had a mass of his performed at Quinta da Boa Vista in 1817.

In 1821 he wrote that his wife had a chronic illness, that his music provided little income, and that he wished to move back to Bahia. In the same petition, he sought an appointment to a position at the Bahia customs house.

Araújo was again in Salvador by 1828, when he composed a Te Deum and began working as chapel master of the cathedral. Between 1833 and 1835, he played at the Saint Elizabeth festivities promoted by the Third Order of Saint Francis. In 1835, a Rio de Janeiro newspaper announced the performance of "a new symphony by the able Professor Damião, well known in this capital for his admirable compositions". In 1848, he offered a Te Deum to Emperor Pedro II. He was married to Silvéria Maria da Conceição, with whom he had several children.

== Music and career ==
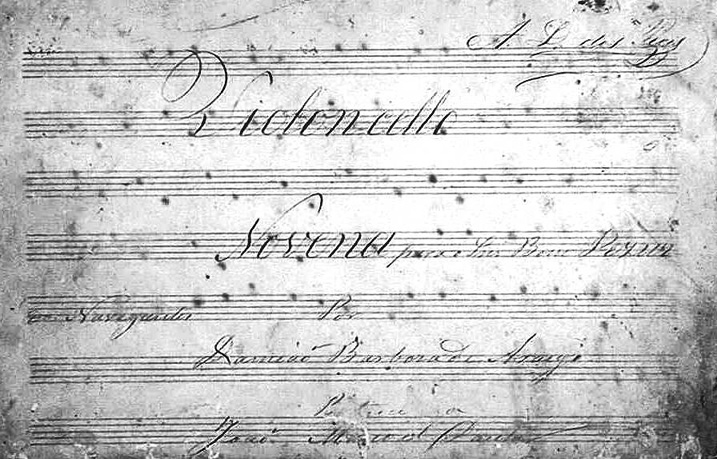
Cover of the cello part for the Novena para o Senhor Bom Jesus dos Navegantes.

Araújo worked in theater, military bands, the royal court and the cathedral. Most of his surviving music is sacred vocal repertory, (Note: Sacred vocal repertory is church music written for voices, with or without instruments. In Araújo's case it includes works such as Masses, motets, Te Deum settings and a Requiem.) especially the kind of music suited to his later post as chapel master (Note: A chapel master was the musician responsible for a church or cathedral's music, including singers, instrumentalists, repertory and music for services.) of Salvador Cathedral. His known works include Masses, motets, Te Deum settings, a Requiem (Note: A Te Deum is a hymn of praise in the Latin Christian tradition. A Requiem is a Mass or musical setting for the dead.) and the Memento Baiano. (Note: Memento is Latin for "remember"; Baiano means "Bahian" or "from Bahia" in Portuguese.) About two dozen works survive today, including instrumental music, overtures, quartets, arias, duets, theater choruses, military marches, modinhas, lundus (Note: A modinha is a Portuguese-Brazilian song form often associated with sentimental or lyrical texts. A lundu is an Afro-Brazilian song and dance genre that also entered urban and theatrical music.) and waltzes.

As a young musician in Salvador, Araújo worked in popular theater and formal musical service. He played violin at the Teatro Guadalupe in performances of plays by António José da Silva, and entered military service as a soldier-musician. Those early years put him close to stage music, civic music and church music, a mixture that later reappeared in his sacred works, court pieces, marches and theatrical music.

In Rio de Janeiro, Araújo joined the musical life of the Portuguese court in Brazil. He led and composed for the band of the Royal Marine Brigade, and also performed in settings linked with the Royal Chapel and the Royal Chamber. (Note: The Royal Chapel and Royal Chamber were court settings in which music served worship, ceremonies and private royal life.) Court work brought him into important musical circles, but it did not give him lasting financial security.

In 1818, Araújo was named future successor to his former teacher Alexandre Gonçalves da Fonseca as chapel master of Salvador Cathedral. The appointment was unusual because it allowed a lay musician (Note: In Catholic usage, a lay person is someone who is not ordained as clergy.) to hold a post normally reserved for clergy. By 1828, he was again in Salvador, where he composed a Te Deum and began working as chapel master. In the 1830s, he also played for festivities of the Third Order of Saint Francis, (Note: A Third Order is a lay religious association connected with a Catholic order, in this case the Franciscans. Members live outside a monastery while following devotional and charitable practices linked to the order.) and in 1848 offered another Te Deum to Pedro II.

Much of Araújo's music has been lost. The missing works include five of his seven overtures and the score of the comic opera A Intriga Amorosa, a vocal work with Italian verses tied to the early nineteenth-century lyric stage in Bahia. Without those scores, his theater music is less accessible than his sacred repertory, where several major works still survive.

Memento Baiano is his best-known composition. Written for chorus and orchestra, it is devotional music for death and mourning, outside the ordinary Mass setting. Modern editions circulate in versions for chorus and chamber orchestra and for chorus and piano.

Surviving work include a 1970 edition that was prepared from manuscript parts (Note: Manuscript parts are handwritten or copied performing parts for individual singers or instrumentalists, rather than a single full score.) kept by the Orquestra Lira Sanjoanense in São João del-Rei. Those parts were not Araújo's autograph manuscript (Note: An autograph manuscript is a manuscript written by the composer.) and date from 1910, but they preserved the music under his name and helped return the work to performance in the twentieth century.

His sacred works also include a Requiem for four voices and orchestra, two Te Deum settings, one for four voices and organ and another for chorus and orchestra, and a Fourth Mass for four voices and orchestra. The Requiem has drawn attention because the Requiem Mass in F major, listed in some José Maurício Nunes Garcia material as CT 190, (Note: CT numbers are catalogue numbers used for works associated with José Maurício Nunes Garcia.) is now treated as Araújo's work rather than Garcia's.

== Selected works ==
Only part of Araújo's music survives. The following list includes works named in modern repertory sources, with public score or listening links where they are available.

=== Sacred and liturgical music ===
- Memento Baiano, for chorus and orchestra. The work is available in modern score form, including a version for chamber orchestra and chorus and a version for chorus and piano. It has also been recorded by Ensemble PHOENIX and the Upper Galilee Choir.
- Requiem in F major, CT 190, for four voices and orchestra.
- Te Deum laudamus, hymn of thanksgiving, including a setting in B-flat major and a third Te Deum dated 1848 in repertory catalogues.
- Fourth Mass, for four voices and orchestra.
- Missa Rival.

=== Secular, theatrical and instrumental music ===
- Tristes saudades, a modinha for voice. A modern score, with audio access, is available from Musica Brasilis.
- Sempre viva, a waltz for piano. A modern score, with audio access, is available from Musica Brasilis.
- A Intriga Amorosa, a comic opera or theatrical vocal work. The score is lost, and no staging is known.
- Overtures, (Note: An overture is an instrumental opening piece, often used before an opera, play or larger musical work.) quartets, arias, duets, theatre choruses, military marches, lundus and other pieces in popular genres. Several works in these areas are lost.

== See also ==
- Music of Brazil
