= Museu da Inconfidência =

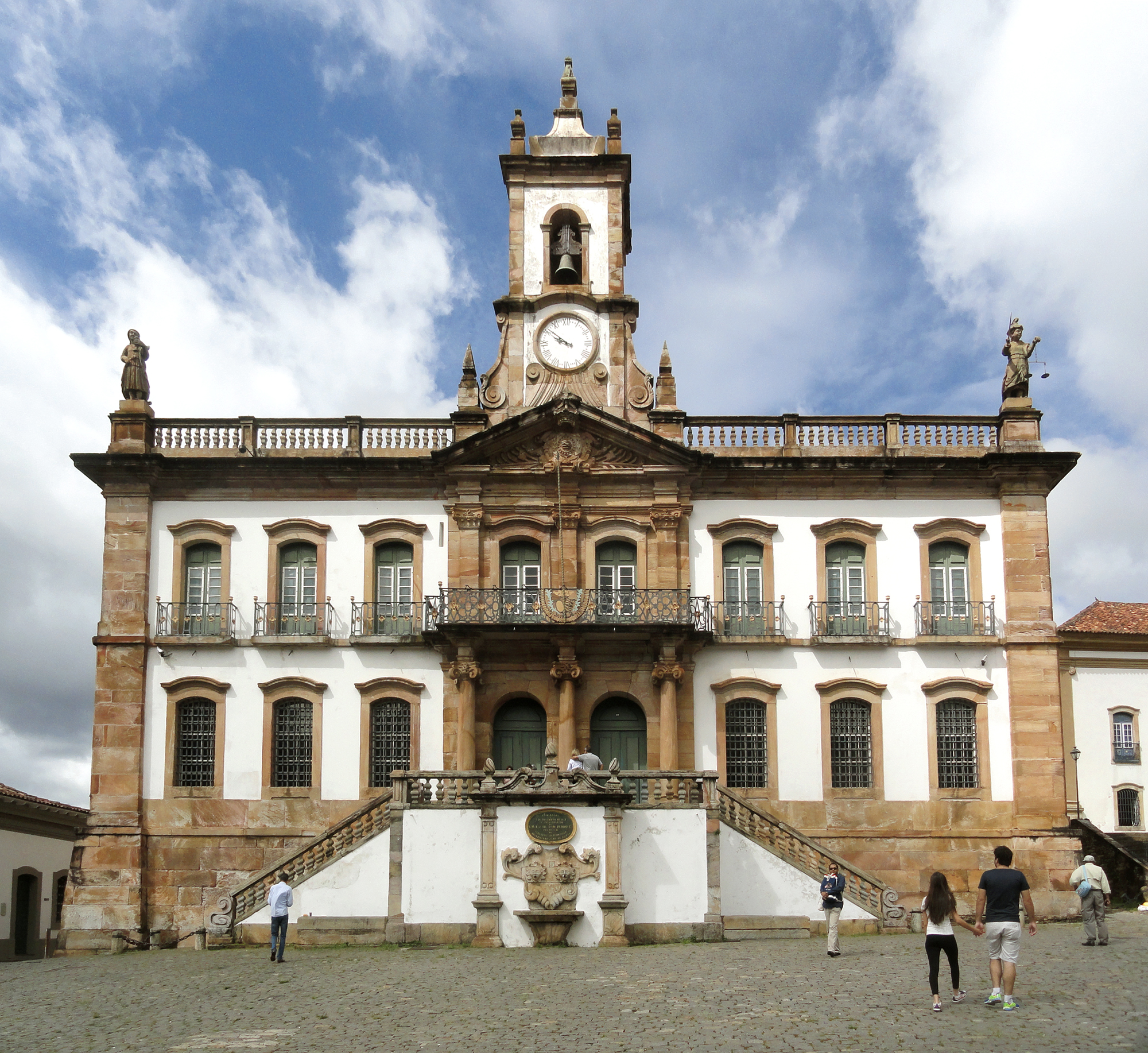
- Façade
- Established: 1938
- Location: Ouro Preto, Minas Gerais, Brazil
- Type: History

National Historic Heritage of Brazil
- Designated: 1954
- Process: 512-T-1954
- Entry No.: 305

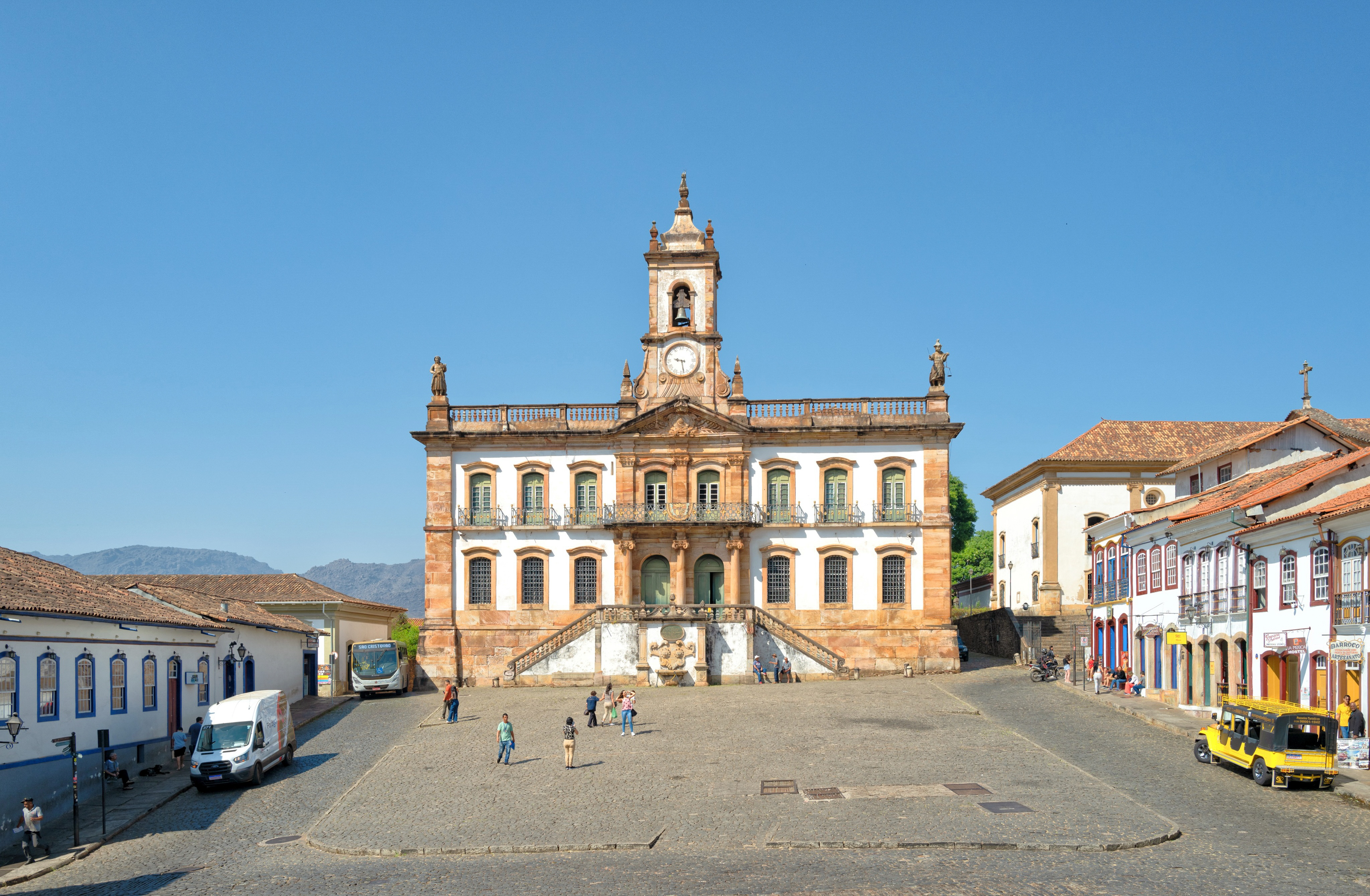
Museum da Inconfidência and Tiradentes Square in 2024

Museu da Inconfidência or Museum of the Inconfidência is a history museum dedicated to those who died in a failed rebellion movement Inconfidência Mineira for Brazilian independence from Portugal. It was established in 1938. It is located in Tiradentes Square in Ouro Preto in Minas Gerais in a former Jail. It was declared as a National Museum of Brazil in 1990.

== History ==
The building where the museum is located, the Ouro Preto House and Chain House, is one of the most important remnants of late Baroque colonial architecture in Brazil, erected by Governor Luís da Cunha Meneses with a project by José Fernandes Pinto Alpoim in the 1780s.

In the 1940s, the then Brazilian President Getúlio Vargas decided that those who died in Inconfidência Mineira were martyrs and their remains were brought back from Africa where they had been buried or exiled by the Colonial Portuguese rulers. The museum was built as a tribute to their memory, and a Pantheon was built to house the remains of the rebels in 1942.
