= Ricardo Tacuchian =

Brazilian composer

- Born: November 18, 1939 (age 86)
- Education: University of Southern California
- Occupation: Doctor in Musical Arts
- Known for: conductor, composer
- Notable work: Ritos

Ricardo Tacuchian, born in Rio de Janeiro (born 18 November 1939), is a Brazilian conductor, composer and Doctor in Musical Arts (Composition) at the University of Southern California.

Positions he has held include Titular Professor of both UFRJ and UNIRIO (where he was the Titular Conductor of the Unirio Orchestra), visiting professor of the State University of New York at Albany and of the Universidade Nova de Lisboa. He received grants and scholarship from Capes, CNPq (Brazil), Other Minds, Fulbright Commission, Rockefeller Foundation (USA), and Appolon Stiftung (Germany), among others. He is a lifetime member of the Brazilian Music Academy, the highest honoring musical institution in Brazil.

== Partial List of Works ==
=== 5 Cantatas ===
- O Canto do Poeta (1969): Cecília Meireles; soprano, violin, flute, and piano. RJ, 1970.
- Cantata dos Mortos (1965): Vinicius de Moraes; baritone, narrator, mixed choir, oboe, bassoon, piano, timpani, and percussion [Sistrum, 1981]. Ouro Preto, 1978.
- Cantata de Natal (1978): Holy Bible, Carlos Drummond de Andrade, Manuel Bandeira, and Folk *Christmas Cycle of the State of Rio de Janeiro; Soprano, Baritone, Narrator, Mixed Choir, and Symphony Orchestra. Rio de Janeiro, 1978.
- Ciclo Lorca (1979): Carlos Drummond de Andrade, Alphonsus de Guimarães Filho, and Murilo Mendes; baritone, clarinet, and String Orchestra. Rio de Janeiro, 1981.

=== Solo pieces for piano, guitar, flute, clarinet, harp, xylophone ===
- Primeira Sonata para Piano (1966). Rio de Janeiro, 1975.
- Segunda Sonata para Piano (1966). Rio de Janeiro, 1966.
- Ritos (1977): harp. Rio de Janeiro, 1977.
- Estruturas Gêmeas (1978): four-hand piano. Brasília, 1978.
- Ludica I (1981): guitar [Max Eschig, 1981]. Toronto, Canada, 1981.
- Ludica II (1984): guitar. Rio de Janeiro, 1985.
- Profiles (1988): guitar. Los Angeles, 1989.
- Rio de Janeiro's Series (1996): 6 pieces for Guitar. Rio de Janeiro, 1996.
- Capoeira (1997): piano. New York, 1997
- Avenida Paulista (1999): piano. Gent, Belgium, 1999.
- Alecrim (2001): for trumpet.
- Aquarela (2002): for left-hand piano
- Leblon à Tarde (2003). Santos, 2003.
- Lamento pelas Criançãs que choram (2003). Albany and NYC, 2003.
- Manjericão (2003). Lisboa, 2004

=== About 25 Pieces for two, three, four and five instruments ===
- Quarteto de Cordas nº 1 "Juvenil" (1963). Rio de Janeiro, 1964.
- Quinteto de Sopros (1969): flute, oboe, clarinet, horn, and bassoon. Rio de Janeiro, 1975.
- Estruturas Simbólicas (1973): clarinet, trumpet, percussion, piano and viola. RJ, 1974
- Estruturas Obstinadas (1974): trumpet, horn, and trombone. Petrópolis, 1977.
- Estruturas Verdes (1976): Violin, violoncello, and piano. Rio de Janeiro, 1977.
- Estruturas Divergentes (1977): flute, oboe, and piano. Belo Horizonte, 1978.
- Cárceres (1979): percussion ensemble for 4 musicians. Buffalo, NY, 1980.
- Quarteto de Cordas nº 2 "Brasília" (1979). São Paulo, 1983.
- Texturas (1987): two harps. Vienna, Austria, 1987.
- Transparências (1987): Vibraphone and piano. Rio de Janeiro, 1987.
- Delaware Park Suite (1988): saxophone alto and piano. Los Angeles, 1989.
- Light and Shadows (1989): vibes, percussion, harp, bass clarinet, and double bass. Los Angeles, 1989.
- Omaggio a Mignone (1997) wind quintet and piano. Rio de Janeiro, 1997.
- Evocação a Lorenzo Fernandez (1997): guitar and flute. Rio de Janeiro, 1997.
- Quarteto de Cordas nº 3 "Bellagio" (2000). Milan, 2000.
- Natureza Morta (2000): Flute, Clarinet, Violin, and Cello.
- Quarteto Informal (2004): Flute, trombone, piano, bass guitar.
- Xilogravura (2004): Viola and Piano

=== Bigger Ensembles ===
- Estruturas Sincréticas (1970): piccolo, clarinet, bass clarinet, 2 horns, 2 trumpets, trombone, 4 timpani, 4 groups of percussion. Rio de Janeiro, 1972.
- Estruturas Primitivas (1975): flute, oboe, horn, piano, viola, and cello. RJ, 1975
- Rio/L.A. (1988): Engl. horn, brass quartet, marimba, perc. (1), piano, and electric bass guitar. LA, 1989.
- Giga Byte (1994): 14 winds and piano obbligato. Rio de Janeiro, 1994.
- Toccata Urbana (1999): Woodwind quartet, piano, and string quintet. New York, 2000.

=== Seven Pieces for String Orchestra with and without soloists ===
- Concertino para Flauta e Orquestra de Cordas (1968). Rio de Janeiro, 1973.
- Concertino para Piano e Orquestra de Cordas (1977): [Sistrum, 1981]. RJ, 1978
- Sinfonieta para Fátima (1986): String Orchestra. Rio de Janeiro, 1986.

=== Pieces for Symphonic Orchestra ===
- Dia de Chuva (1963). Rio de Janeiro, 1964.
- Imagem Carioca (1967). Rio de Janeiro, 1969.
- Estruturas Sinfônicas (1976). Rio de Janeiro, 1978.
- Núcleos (1983). Rio de Janeiro, 1983.
- Hayastan (1990). São Paulo, 1993.
- Terra Aberta (1997): The Bible and D. Pedro Casaldáliga; soprano and symphonic orchestra. Rio de Janeiro, 1997.
- Toccata Sinfônica (2001). São Paulo, 2002

=== Computer Music ===
- Prisma (1989). Los Angeles, 1989.

There are also 7 Cycles of Songs, some single songs for voice and piano and about 30 a cappella choir pieces

== Some CDs with Tacuchian's music ==
- Estruturas/Structures, Tacuchian Anos 70/ Tacuchian in the 1970s (RioArte Digital)
- Imagem Carioca: Música para Violão de R. Tacuchian (ABM Digital). Tacuchian's guitar music
- Carnaval/Carnival. Music from Brazil and the U.S. (North/South Recordings)
  - Toccarta Urbana. The North/South Chamber Orchestra (Max Lifchitz, conductor).
- Mélange (North/South Recordings)
  - Cono Sur . Richard Albagli, xylophone
  - Transparências. Richard Albagli, vibraphone; Max Lifchitz, piano
- Tacuchian Piano Music (ABM Digital)
