= Elias Álvares Lobo =

Brazilian composer

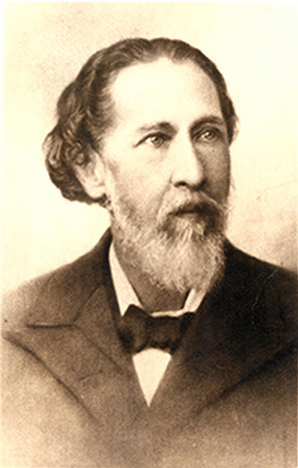
Elias Àlvares portrait

Elias Álvares Lobo (9 August 1834 – 15 December 1901) was a Brazilian composer.

Lobo was born in Itu, Brazil. He wrote the first Brazilian opera in the Portuguese language, A Noite de São João (Saint John's Party Night).
