= Vânia Dantas Leite =

Brazilian musician (1945–2018)

Vania Dantas Leite (13 August 1945 – 10 August 2018) was a Brazilian composer, pianist, electronic musician, conductor and music educator.

== Life ==
Vania Dantas Leite was born in Rio de Janeiro, Brazil, and studied composition with Frederico Egger and piano with Zila de M. Brito at the Escola Nacional de Musica. In 1974 she began to study electronic music and purchased equipment from Electronic Music Studio in London. She established a private laboratory in Rio de Janeiro and began to participate in European and American festivals as a composer of electronic music.

In 1981 she took a teaching position at the Federal University of the State of Rio de Janeiro, where she founded and served as director of the Studio for Electroacoustic Music of the Villa-Lobos Institute (SE-FIR).

== Honors and awards ==
- 1972: 1st place National Composition Contest
- 1973: 3rd place International Conducting Competition
- 1996: Rio de Janeiro RJ - Award Scholarship Program

== Works ==
Selected works include:

- ((+ - = -))
- + & - ?
- Jur-A-Amo?
- Caleidocosmos
- Canto de Orfeo
- Cycles
- Di-stances
- Fantasy of Brazil - Eguns?
- Fantasy of Brazil - Osanyin?
- Karisma
- L'Indien et l'Owino
- Orpheus Forest
- Spectral Landscapes
- Palavrasons
- Piano Memory
- Sforzato / Piano
- I want you Green
- Vita Vitae
- ((X))
- ((Y))
- Harmony of Spaces
