= José Carlos Amaral Vieira =

Brazilian composer

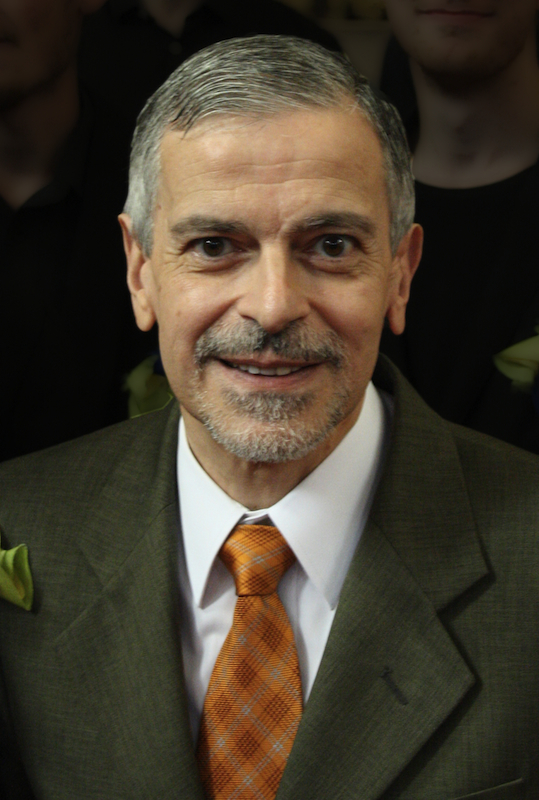

Background information
- Born: 1952 (age 73–74); São Paulo, Brazil
- Occupations: Composer, pianist, musicologist
- Instrument: Piano
- Website: www.amaralvieira.com

José Carlos Amaral Vieira (born 1952 in São Paulo) is a Brazilian composer, pianist, and musicologist. He has performed solo since he was eight years old and studied in Europe from 1965 to 1976. He returned to Brazil in 1977 and has since composed for several genres there.

== Biography ==
José Carlos Amaral Vieira was born in 1952 in São Paulo . He studied piano with Souza Lima and composition with Artur Hartmann in Brazil.

Vieira later studied in France at the Paris Conservatory with Lucette Descaves and Olivier Messiaen; in Germany at the Freiburger Musikhochschule with Carl Seeman and Konrad Lechner; and in the United Kingdom with Louis Kentner.

In 1977 he returned to Brazil to embark on the career of a virtuoso performer, while introducing his own compositions in concert programmes. He has achieved international acclaim both as a concert and recording artist, composer, and musicologist, and has appeared throughout the Americas, Europe, and Asia. Among his honors, Vieira has been the recipient of the Arthur Honegger International Composition Award, a Grand Prix International (Fondation de France), Hungary's Liszt Award, and Japan's Min-On Award.

== List of compositions ==
- Te Deum in stilo barocco (Te Deum in the Baroque Style), Op. 213 (1986)
- Stabat Mater for choir, soloists and piano, Op. 229 (1988) and for choir, soloists and orchestra, Op. 240 (1989)
- Sons inovadores (Sounds of Innovation), Op. 266 (1992)
- Missa Choralis. Op. 213 (1984)
- "Alvorada de esperança da civilização universal" (Dawn of Hope for Humanistic Civilization), Op. 268
- O alvorecer do século da humanidade (Dawn of the Century for Humanity), Op. 259 (1991)
- Canção da juventude (Song of Youth), Op. 274
- Palavras de encorajamento (Words of Encouragement (Op. 267)
- Divertimento Piccolo (for Wind Quintet), Op. 111 (1978)
