= Jocy de Oliveira =

Brazilian pianist, multimedia artist and composer

Jocy de Oliveira (formerly de Carvalho; born 11 April 1936) is a Brazilian pianist, multimedia artist and composer.

== Biography ==
Jocy de Oliveira was born in Curitiba and grew up in São Paulo, Brazil. She studied in São Paulo with Joseph Kliass, in Paris with Marguerite Long, and in St. Louis with Robert Wykes. She received a Master of Arts from Washington University in St. Louis.

De Oliveira became a concert pianist as a child, playing internationally with artists including Stravinsky and John Cage. She married conductor Eleazar de Carvalho but later divorced, and lived in St. Louis, New York City and Rio de Janeiro. She is a member of the Brazilian Academy of Music, and is the author of four books.

== Honors and awards ==
- Rockefeller Foundation
- New York Council on the Arts
- Meet the Composer
- Foundation of Art and Culture Vitae (Brazil)

== Works ==
De Oliveira composes mainly electronic and multimedia works for video projects, stage and musical theater. Selected works include:

- Polinterações I and II (1970)
- Música no espaço, planetarium event (1982/83)
- Fata Morgana (1987)
- Liturgia Thurs Espaço (1988)
- Inori à prostituta Sagrada (1993)
- Illud Tempus (1994)
- Canto e Raga (1995)
- Cenas de una Trilogia (1999)
- As Malibran (1999/2000)
- Medea, Profecia e Balada (2003)
- Kseni Estrangeira-A (2003/2005)

Her work has been recorded and issued on CD and DVD, including:

- Catalogue d'oiseaux, Olivier Messiaen (Vox)
- Vingt regards sur l'enfant-Jésus, Olivier Messiaen (Vox)
- Inori à prostituta sagrada Rer BJOCD, ASIN:B000O00HFE
- Illud tempus ABM DIGITAL, ASIN:B003ZU8YGE
- As Malibrans (2000) ASIN:B00004UAWV

== Books ==
- O 3 º Mundo (São Paulo, 1959)
- Apague meu spot light (São Paulo, 1961)
- Dias e seus Caminhos Mapas e partituras (1983)
- Inori - a prostituta sagrada (2003)
