= Francisco Gomes da Rocha =

Brazilian composer

Francisco Gomes da Rocha (1745–1808) was a Brazilian composer, singer and bassoonist. He was one of the main musicians of Vila Rica City, today known as Ouro Preto. He was the successor of Emerico Lobo de Mesquita in Vila Rica. Only five works, out of the 200 he would have produced, are preserved in manuscripts.
