= Marisa Rezende =

Brazilian music educator and composer (born 1944)

- Born: August 8, 1944 (age 81); Rio de Janeiro, Brazil
- Genres: Classical
- Occupation(s): Music educator, composer

Marisa Rezende (born 8 August 1944) is a Brazilian music educator and composer.

== Personal life ==
Marisa Rezende was born in Rio de Janeiro, the daughter of a doctor (Nunes de Barcellos) and his wife (Costa Pereira) of Portuguese ancestry. She began playing piano at four without instruction and began lessons at age five. She studied piano at Escola de Musica in Rio, but her studies were interrupted by marriage. The couple moved in 1964 to Boston, Massachusetts, where her husband worked on a master's degree at MIT.

Rezende had two daughters in Boston, and when the family moved back to Rio in 1967, she had a third daughter before resuming her studies in composition. The family moved to Recife, where she worked as a pianist with the orchestra and finished her undergraduate degree. She studied fugue and counterpoint with Morelenbaum and Virginia Fiuza and composition with Padre Jaime Diniz.

== Career ==
After graduating, she completed a master's degree in piano at the University of California, Santa Barbara, where she studied composition with Peter Fricker and David Gordon. She also completed a doctorate in composition at UCSB, and post-doctoral work at the University of Keele, England. After completing her studies, she took a position at Escola de Musica in Rio teaching composition. In 1989 she helped to found Musica Nova, an organization to premiere new music compositions, working with Rodolfo Caesar and Rodrigo Cicchelli. In 1999 she was awarded the Bolsa Vitae de Artes. She retired from teaching in 2002 but operates the Music and Technology Lab at the Federal University of Rio de Janeiro and continues work as a composer.

== Published works ==
Rezende has composed for orchestra, chamber ensemble and solo instrument and her compositions been performed internationally. Selected works include:

- Volante (1990) for flute, clarinet, cello and piano
- Syntagma (1988) for flute, percussion and piano
- Variations (1995) for flute
- Elos (1995) for harpsichord
- Resonances (1983) for piano
- Mutations (1991) for piano four hands
- Contrasts (2001) for piano
- Vortex (1997) for string quartet
- Schisms (1997) for violin, viola, cello, bass and piano

Her work has been recorded and issued on CD including:

- Marisa Rezende - Música de Câmara (2006)
