= José Maurício Nunes Garcia =

Brazilian composer (1767–1830)

The Reverend José Maurício Nunes Garcia
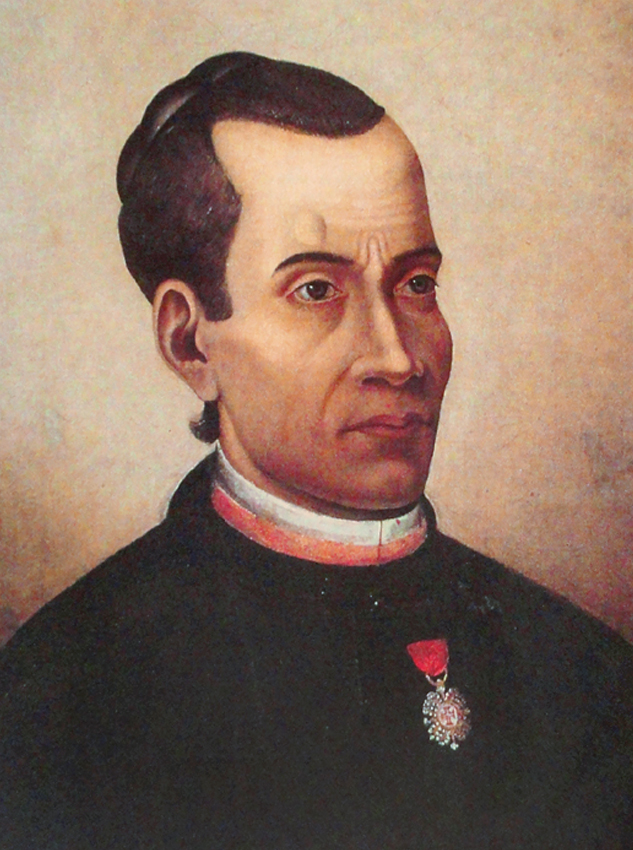
- Garcia, wearing the Order of Christ
- Born: September 20, 1767; Rio de Janeiro, State of Brazil
- Died: April 18, 1830 (aged 62); Rio de Janeiro, Empire of Brazil

José Maurício Nunes Garcia (September 20, 1767 – April 18, 1830) was a Brazilian composer and priest, who is known as one of the greatest exponents of the Classical style in the Americas.

Born in Rio de Janeiro to bi-racial parents, Nunes Garcia lost his father at an early age. His mother perceived that her son had an inclination for becoming a musician and, for this reason, improved her work to allow him to continue his musical studies.

Nunes Garcia became a Catholic priest and, when King John VI of Portugal came to Rio de Janeiro with 15,000 people in tow, Nunes Garcia was appointed Master of the Royal Chapel. He sang and played the harpsichord, performing his compositions as well as those of other composers such as Domenico Cimarosa and Wolfgang Amadeus Mozart. He was a very prestigious musician in the royal court of John VI.

His musical style was strongly influenced by Viennese composers of the period, such as Mozart and Haydn. Today, some 240 musical pieces written by Nunes Garcia survive, and at least 170 others are known to have been lost. Most of his compositions are sacred works, but he wrote also some secular pieces, including the opera Le due gemelle and the Tempest Symphony.

== Infancy and youth ==
On September 22, 1767, in a house at Rua da Vala, in Rio de Janeiro, a boy was born to parents, both of whom were biracial, Victória Maria da Cruz and the tailor Apolinário Nunes Garcia. Victória was born in the city of Mariana, in the province of Minas Gerais, and Apolinário, in Ilha do Governador (Governor's Island), near the city of Rio de Janeiro. Victória's mother was Joana Gonçalves, slave of Simão Gonçalves, and Apolinário was the son of Ana Correa do Desterro, slave of the parish Apolinário Nunes Garcia. Their baptism documents have no record of their fathers' names, evidence they were both their masters' children. Victoria and Apolinário married in 1762. The boy, who had been born on St Maurice's day, was baptized José Mauricio Nunes Garcia, on December 20, 1767, in the city's cathedral, now the Church of Nossa Senhora do Rosário.

An aunt, whose name is not known, lived with the family. After Apolinário's death in 1773, she and Victória raised Nunes Garcia and, when his precocious musical talent was detected, succeeded to contract, not without sacrifice, Salvador José de Almeida e Faria to teach him music. Faria had been educated in the musical style of Minas Gerais in the 18th century, and made his career there. This style is present in Nunes Garcia's early compositions.

To complete his musical education, he probably joined the cathedral's boys choir as a soprano. The choir's members were students of the Seminário de São Joaquim, now the Pedro II School, where they learned to read music, Greek and Latin. According to Manuel de Araújo Porto Alegre, one of Nunes Garcia's early biographers, the young boy had "a beautiful voice and a sharp musical memory", "reproduced everything he heard", and "created his own melodies and played the harpsichord and the guitar without ever have learned to".

In 1779, at twelve, Nunes Garcia began to teach music. Since he never had a piano or a harpsichord, he exercised on the keyboard by teaching society ladies in their homes. He learned to play the organ later, when he was already a priest, assisted by some good organists in the churches. He completed his education in the Royal Classes, public lectures in history, geography, Latin grammar, philosophy and rhetoric.

== The first steps for priesthood ==
Note: the abbreviation CPM refers to the Thematic Catalogue of Nunes Garcia's Works, compiled by the musicologist Mrs. Cleofe Person de Mattos. In 1783, at 16, Nunes Garcia composed his first surviving work: the antiphon Tota pulchra Es Maria (CPM 1). In the 1780s, he studied for the examinations he had to go through to take the holy orders, and developed a musical partnership with the old chapel master and subchanter of the See, deacon João Lopes Ferreira. These would be his first steps to succeed him as the chapel master.

In 1784, the brotherhood of Saint Cecilia, the traditional guild of the musicians, was founded in Rio de Janeiro. Nunes Garcia, at 17, was allowed to sign the foundation act, as he was already recognized as a professional music teacher. By the end of the 1780s, he had already a large repertoire of his own: a Litany for Our Lady for 4 voices and organ, in 1788; the anthems O Redemptor Summe Carmen and Pange Lingua, both in 1789; and the works a capella for all the Holy Week of the See, the Bradados or Passions, of these the most important was Bradados de 6ª feira maior (CPM 219), or Passion for Good Friday; this work originally included some motets classified – and nowadays sung – apart: Crux Fidelis (CPM 205), Heu Domine (CPM 211), Popule Meus (CPM 222), Sepulto Domino (CPM 223), and Vexilla Regis (CPM 225). In 1790 Nunes Garcia composed an instrumental work that made him famous in Rio de Janeiro: the Funeral Symphony (CPM 230).

He requested the holy orders in 1791. The two main prerequisites to be accepted were to prove the true Catholic faith from himself and from his parents, and to be free from "any color defect". The first had been proved through research and witnessing from his parents' and grandmothers' friends. To overcome the second, he requested to be dismissed from his "defect", in which he was successful.

In June 1791, he began the necessary examinations, and in March 1792 he was approved. There was one last requirement to take orders: to be an estate owner. This was gone through with the help of one of his student's father, Thomaz Gonçalves, a rich merchant who donated him a house at Rua das Bellas Noutes.

Nunes Garcia tried to develop himself in oratory, as it was useful to a priest, taking part in meetings of the Literary Society, founded in 1794. In 1797, the society was closed and their leaders arrested, under the accusation of revolutionary activities against the Crown. Among the arrested was Manuel Inácio da Silva Alvarenga, a poet born in the city of Vila Rica, and relative of Inácio José de Alvarenga Peixoto, one of the condemned leaders of the Inconfidência Mineira, a 1789 uprising in the province of Minas Gerais.

In 1795, he was appointed as public music instructor, installing a free music class in his own house. There the only instrument left for teaching was a steel guitar, used in sequence by all the students. Great musicians and singers there began their musical education. They would enrich Rio's musical stage during almost all the 19th century.

== Chapel master ==
Following his ordination, Nunes Garcia enjoyed a period of great productivity. From this period are known 32 pieces of music, among them graduals, antiphons, various psalms, a Magnificat (CPM 16) for voices and organ, the vespers Vésperas das Dores de N. Srª. (CPM 177), Vésperas de N. Srª. (CPM 178), and several works for Holy Week: two Miserere, one for Maundy Thursday (CPM 194), and the other for Good Friday (CPM 195), and, in 1797, his first mass, Missa para os pontificiais da Sé – Pontifical mass of the See. On July 4 (or 5th), 1798, deacon Lopes Ferreira died. Two days earlier, perhaps because of his imminent death, Nunes Garcia was nominated chapel master. His dream of succeeding the master had come true. The position of subchanter was occupied by deacon José Mariano.

In 1799 he joined the brotherhood of Nossa Senhora do Rosário e São Benedito dos Homens Pretos, in whose church the See was installed. This same year he composed a Funeral Office (CPM 183) and a Requiem Mass (CPM 184), in honour of the deceased deacons, probably a personal tribute to Lopes Ferreira, and the Matins of Christmas (CPM 170).

As his house at Rua das Bellas Noutes was near the city's Public Garden, there is evidence that he took part in the traditional serenades there, for, in 1837, the scores of three of his popular compositions were printed by music editor Pierre Laforge; the Modinhas: Beijo a mão que me condena (CPM 226) – I kiss the hand that signs my condemnation; Marília, se não me amas (CPM 238) – Marília, if you don't love me, and No momento da partida, meu coração t'entreguei (CPM 239), – at the moment of the departure I gave you my heart. At the beginning of the 19th century, he diversified his production with two overtures: The Tempest (CPM 233) and Zemira (CPM 231), both written in 1803.

Few of his other works composed between 1800 and 1807 are known: two graduals, the motet Te Christe Solum Novimus (CPM 52), written in 1800, the Te Deum for the Matins of the Assumption (CPM 91) the Mass in B Flat (CPM 102), both written in 1801, and the antiphon In Honorem Beatissimae Maria Virginis (CPM 4), written in 1807. He resumed his rhetoric classes with Silva Alvarenga from 1802 to 1804, but of his purely rhetorical works, only the titles of two of his sermons are known.

Despite celibacy, Nunes Garcia had in the first decade of the 19th century a marital relationship with Severiana Rosa de Castro, born in 1789. From this relationship five children were born: José Apolinário, in 1807; Apolinário José, in 1808; Josefina in 1810, Panfília in 1811 and Antônio José in 1813. The elder, José Apolinário, later changed his own name to José Maurício Nunes Garcia Jr, after his father's acknowledgement, in 1828.

== The Portuguese Royal Family arrives in Rio de Janeiro ==
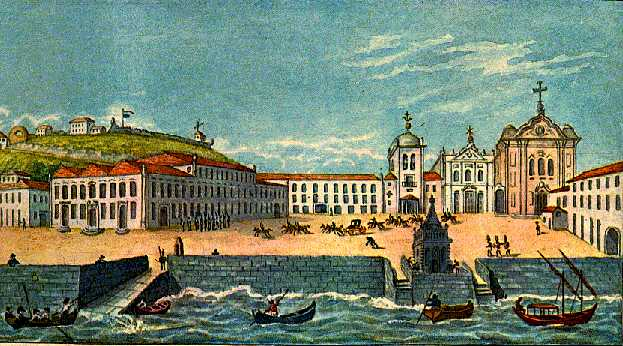
The Palace Square of Rio de Janeiro, 1808. Watercolor by Richard Bates.

In January, 1808 the brig Voador brought to Rio the news of the imminent arrival of the Portuguese Royal Family. They were fleeing from the invasion of their kingdom by the French troops, led by general Junot.

Some weeks later, another boat brought the information of the precise date of the arrival: March 7, and a request from prince regent John: to assist at a Te Deum, celebrated in the city's See, in thanksgiving for the successful trip. Some steps were taken in advance for the occasion, and at the informed date, the Anglo-Portuguese fleet reached the bay of Rio de Janeiro.

The prince regent and his court disembarked the next day, walking from the port to the See. Along the way, there were fireworks, music and the churches' bells tolling. When the prince entered the church, a "great orchestra", joined by the boys' choir, began to play.

The music was conducted by Nunes Garcia. About it, besides probably his Te Deum in D (CPM 96) written in 1799, there were presented the antiphons O Beatae Sebastiane, and Sub Tuum Praesidium (CPM 2).

The prince regent, though enthusiastic about the music, did not have the same opinion about the players. Soon he became aware of the precarious state of the See, and the quarrels between the Chapter and the church's brotherhood. One of his first decrees in Rio was to transfer the Chapter to the church of the Firsts of the Carmel, next to the Governor's Palace. Soon he had the idea to create a Royal Chapel, to replace his Patriarchal of Lisbon, to be installed in this church.

The institution was made official when the Portuguese bishop Dom José Caetano da Silva Coutinho arrived in the city, on April 25, 1808. He had to act with diplomacy to integrate the priests of the Patriarchal of Lisbon with the Chapter of the See of Rio de Janeiro. The admission of the Brazilian priests had been officialized, but the Portuguese clergy thought otherwise: in an anonymous document, they stated that, as a measure of economy, the ministers should be limited to those who previously served the prince regent. This would spare him to see in his chapel someone with a "visible physical defect". That someone with a "visible physical defect" was Nunes Garcia.

That was only the beginning of a series of aggressive actions, that had the objective of humiliating the man they considered to be of an inferior race. But the prince regent, recognizing his musical gifts, confirmed him, on November 26, as the master musician of the Royal Chapel. That made Nunes Garcia officially the first musician of the kingdom of Portugal.

== Master of Music of the Royal Chapel ==
The move of the court to Rio de Janeiro was traumatic to the city's 60,000 natives. At once there were 15,000 new inhabitants, needing housing and food. The court servants were first lodged at the ucharia – the city's food warehouse at the Carmelite Monastery. The aristocrats needed houses for themselves and for their families, and since there were no homes left, they resorted to requesting them by force. Once chosen, the house was marked with the initials P.R. (Prince Regent), and their owners had to leave it in 24 hours.

To avoid problems with food supply due to the sudden increase in the city's population, the prince regent decreed that improvements would be made at the Royal Farm of Santa Cruz, a former Jesuit settlement distant seven leagues (30 miles) from the city. Tre property had been transferred to the Crown in 1769, when the Jesuits were expelled from Portugal and all the colonies. The goods there produced were transported to Rio and sold at the ucharia.

The farm would be soon transformed in a summer palace for the royal family. Since, when it was owned by the Jesuites, it had a choir of slaves, and as they would be useful at the masses, the prince regent commissioned two music teachers to live and work there to improve their music skills. The musical ensemble of the See did not please the prince. To improve their quality, the musicians of the Patriarchal of Lisbon, most of them still living in that city, were called to Rio. The task of composing new works was left to Nunes Garcia.

From 1808 to 1811, he composed about 70 works for the royal solemnities. The main compositions of 1808 were the Mass of São Pedro de Alcântara (CPM 104), offered to prince Dom Pedro, the Missa Pastoril (CPM 108) – Pastoral Mass, the Missa em Fá (CPM 103) – Mass in F, an orchestrated Qui Sedes (CPM 162) and some works which are now lost: a Christmas Mass, and a Mass for the queen Saint Elizabeth, both for voices and organ.

The musicians of Lisbon were artists of great technique and virtuosity, and they made Rio de Janeiro an important musical center at that time. The quality of the performers was reflected in the works of the chapel master. But as they were acquainted with a different musical style, and were not satisfied that they were being conducted by a musician who they considered was of an inferior race, they acted as a pressure group against him. The musicians of the old See also joined the new orchestra.

In 1809, even with an incomplete music staff, various ceremonies were celebrated with music. This year a holiday in thanksgiving for the royal family's successful trip to Rio was decreed, and a Mass and a Te Deum were composed by Nunes Garcia, for this first year. The other 1809 compositions were: a Mass of St. Michael the Archangel, the Mass for St. Peter of Alcantara (CPM 105), the Mass for the Feast of the Visitation of Our Lady and the one For the Kingdom's Guardian Angel.

Holy Week was celebrated solemnly in the Royal Chapel. Among the compositions heard was a Creed for 8 voices, for Maundy Thursday, a Motet of Our Lady, both lost. The surviving works were: Judas Mercator Pessimus (CPM 195), the Matins for the Resurrection (CPM 200), – and the sequentia Lauda Sion (CPM 165), for the feast of Corpus Christi. In this same year he composed the music for two allegoric stage plays, written by Gastão Fausto da Câmara Coutinho: Ulissea, Drama Eroico (CPM 229) and O Triunfo da América (CPM 228) – The Triumph of America.

In February 1809, the prince regent, impressed by the improvisations played by Nunes Garcia at the pianoforte in his palace, retrieved a medal from the coat of the baron of Vila Nova and attached it to his garments, making him a knight of the Order of Christ. Still in this year, he was named archivist of the royal music files, just brought from the Queluz Palace in Lisbon to Rio. This job put him in contact with a more up-to-date repertory, and by studying the scores, he incorporated new techniques to his compositional skills.His salary, although sufficient for him alone, was not enough to face his children's needs for food, education and care. Soon he, in severe debt, decided to mortgage his house.

Despite his personal problems, he proceeded with his work. His compositions of 1810 are the Matinas de S. João, – Matins of St. John, the Mass and the Te Deum in thanksgiving for the successful trip of the royal family, the antiphon Ecce Sacerdos (CPM 5), and the Magnificat for the Vespers of St. Joseph (CPM 17). By the end of the year he had finished the motet Praecursor Domini (CPM 55), for the farm of Santa Cruz, and the Missa de N. Srª da Conceição (CPM 106) – Mass of the Conception of Our Lady, a turning point in his musical career. This work reflects clearly what he had learned with the royal music files.

== Marcos Portugal deputizes for Nunes Garcia ==
In 1811, probably due to the excess of work, Nunes Garcia may have felt severely ill; an evidence for this was a request to the prince to "say the mass at home".The prince regent, also aware of the pressure put upon him by the European musicians, had no option but to demand his former court composer, Marcos Portugal to cross the ocean and substitute for Nunes Garcia.

It seems that Portugal did not want to leave his country. But pressed by the prince, he left Lisbon in March 1811. After a month's trip, he was warmly received in Rio de Janeiro. As in Lisbon eleven years before, he was nominated Master of Music of the Royal Chapel and Director of the Royal Theatre of São João, then under construction. His first meeting with Nunes Garcia was likely to be cordial. The priest, requested to play a Haydn sonata at the harpsichord, received greetings for his performance, and Portugal declared: "Beautiful! You are my brother in Art! Surely you will be for me a friend."

There is no evidence that Nunes Garcia was dismissed in the replacement, or suffered financial loss because of it. Instead, the new situation seemed to be advantageous for him. The titles of some of his own compositions from this period show a clear division of work: Portugal became responsible for the music at the main ceremonies of the Royal Chapel, leaving him the ceremonies of the royal Quinta da Boa Vista, and of the royal farm of Santa Cruz, such as it is in the subtitle of the motet Tamquam Aurum (CPM 56).

Besides, having six other mouths to feed, he was now able to find the necessary free time to accept commissioned works from other churches, increasing his own income. After 1811, most of his works were no longer written for the Royal Chapel, but for smaller churches in Rio de Janeiro. By this time the mortgage on his house was paid, another evidence of his financial health.

== Working as a freelance ==
In the year 1813, Nunes Garcia began to compose regularly for the church of the Thirds of Carmel, side by side with the Royal Chapel. Upon request of his friend Baptista Lisboa, he wrote two psalms: Laudate Dominum (CPM 76) and Laudate Pueri Dominum (CPM 77). This same year, for the church of Nossa Senhora da Boa Morte (Our Lady of the Good Death) he orchestrated his Matinas da Assunção de Nossa Senhora (CPM 172) – Matins of the Assumption of Our Lady, written in 1808, and wrote a Missa Pequena – Small Mass, to the feast of Saint Therese.

In 1813 the Royal Theatre of São João, still unfinished, was opened to the public. In this same year, the French army, led by Napoleon Bonaparte, was defeated in Leipzig, and in 1814 Pope Pius VII returned to Rome from his exile in Avignon. These events were cheerfully celebrated in Rio de Janeiro.

Only two of the works written by Nunes Garcia in 1814 are known: the Novena do Apóstolo São Pedro (CPM 66) – Novena of the Apostle St. Peter, and the Bendito e Louvado Seja o Santíssimo Sacramento (CPM 12) – Blessed and Praised let it be the Holiest of Sacraments. On November 22 he was awarded from the Prince Regent's Privy Purse an annual amount of 25$000 (twenty five thousand réis), to build his "clerical assets". In 1815 he composed the Matinas do Apóstolo São Pedro (CPM 173) – Matins of the Apostle St. Peter, for the brotherhood of São Pedro dos Clérigos.

In December 1815, in order to grant for Portugal a seat at the Holy Alliance's assembly, Brazil was promoted from a Portuguese colony to a united kingdom with Portugal and Algarves. In theory, this would make all Brazilians equal in rights to the Portuguese, but in practice, everything was kept as it was. In the beginning of 1816, Nunes Garcia was chosen to conduct the mass in thanksgiving for the event, just because he was a Brazilian native. The mass was celebrated in the church of St. Francis of Paula, at the Largo da Sé Velha, now Largo de São Francisco. It is not known what music was performed during the ceremony.

This year Nunes Garcia composed the Moteto para a Ordenação do Ilustre Bispo da Real Capela – Motet for the Ordination of the Illustrious Bishop of the Royal Chapel; the ceremony occurred only on March 15, 1816. Coincidentally, on March 20, 1816, came the deaths of the Portuguese Queen, Maria I, and of Vitória Maria da Cruz, Nunes Garcia's mother.

The Queen's death was mourned by the whole city. The funeral carriage passed through many streets to the tomb at the Convent of Ajuda, and it was followed by the people in silence. A month later, on April 22, her funeral mass was celebrated solemnly at the Royal Chapel, with a Requiem Mass and a Funeral Office, both composed and conducted by Marcos Portugal.

To promote their own funeral ceremony, the Thirds of the Carmel commissioned to Nunes Garcia a whole new Missa de Mortos (CPM 185), a requiem which was clearly influenced by Mozart's famous work, and an Ofício de Defuntos (CPM 186) – a Funeral Office, both considered to be his two masterpieces. On July 4, 1816, a third master of music, Fortunato Mazziotti, was admitted at the Royal Chapel. Shortly after, on July 10, he conducted David Perez's Mattutino dei Morti in a second ceremony in memoriam of the Queen.

== During the United Kingdom of Portugal, Brazil and the Algarves ==
The prince regent, in a gesture of reconciliation with France, and concerned about the development of culture and arts in Brazil, sponsored the travel to Rio of a French artistic mission, with specialists in painting, sculpture, architecture, and historiography.

The Missão Artística Francesa arrived in Rio de Janeiro on March 26, 1816. Led by the historiographer Henri Lebreton, the group consisted of Jean-Baptiste Debret (painter), Grandjean de Montigny (architect), Auguste Marie Taunay and Zepherin Ferrez (sculptors), and Nicholas Antoine Taunay (painter and historiographer), among many others. As soon as Taunay heard the music of Nunes Garcia, he passed to call him "le grand mulâtre".

Some weeks later, integrating the committee of the Duke of Luxembourg, the Austrian composer Sigismund Neukomm (Salzburg, 1778; Paris 1858) disembarked in Rio. When in Salzburg, Neukomm had been pupil of Joseph and Michael Haydn. In his whole career, he composed about 1,800 works.

Despite his skills, Neukomm was not admitted to the Royal Chapel. Instead, he was appointed Music Teacher to their Royal Highnesses, a position he held until 1821, when he travelled back to Europe. He was severely critical of the operatic style prevalent in sacred music at the time, and of the 45 works he composed in Brazil, only one was performed in the Royal Chapel: the Missa Pro Acclamationis Joannis VI, which he had composed for the acclamation of the prince regent king John VI of Portugal, in 1817. He held Nunes Garcia in high esteem, although most of what he said was reported by Manuel de Araújo Porto Alegre, who claimed to have met him in Paris in 1853.

Neukomm was also responsible for the first presentation in Brazil of Mozart's Requiem (K 626), in the church of the Recolhimento do Parto, with the musicians of the brotherhood of St. Cecilia conducted by Nunes Garcia. In December 1819, Neukomm wrote a Libera Me based in some of its themes, which was presented in sequence, and an article about the performance was published in 1820 in the newspaper Allgemeines Musikalisches Zeitung of Vienna, in which he affirmed it "was in nothing behind any european presentation".

That was his unique first hand opinion about Nunes Garcia. The writings of Porto Alegre which claim that he regarded the Brazilian composer as "one of the greatest improvisers of the world", or that "he admired his self-education in music" are suspicious, because he is not even mentioned in Neukomm's autobiography.

In 1817, prince Dom Pedro married archduchess Maria Leopoldina Josepha Carolina, daughter of the Emperor of Austria. The archduchess, who had a thorough religious and musical education, brought with her an ensemble of 16 musicians. She arrived in Rio on November 5. The excellence of the musicians made the people gather at Largo de São Jorge, near Nunes Garcia's house, to hear the rehearsals. The priest composed for this ensemble a series of 12 Divertimenti, received with enthusiasm, whose original scores were taken with them and are now lost.

Meanwhile, Marcos Portugal had another stroke, which left his right arm paralyzed. Soon, by request of the prince regent, Nunes Garcia composed the opera Le Due Gemelle, the first work of its kind to be presented in Brazil. The score would later be destroyed in the fire of the Royal Theatre of São João in 1825. Only one work of his survives from the year 1817: the Trezena of St. Francis of Paula (CPM 75), composed for the church of this saint.

In February 1818, prince regent John was acclaimed king John VI of Portugal, Brazil and Algarves. A new palace had been built specially for the ceremony of acclamation, next to the old one in the Palace Square. The Te Deum had already been composed by Portugal before his stroke. The Mass, as mentioned above, was composed by Neukomm.

In the year 1818, Nunes Garcia's production proceeded. He composed, to the Thirds of the Carmel, the Novena (CPM 67) and the Mass for the Feast of Our lady of Carmel (CPM 110), which he conducted with the musicians of the Royal Chapel. He composed also a Qui Sedes and Quoniam (CPM 163), for his pupil Cândido Inácio da Silva. To the Royal Farm of Santa Cruz, he wrote three motets: Moteto dos Apóstolos, – Motet of the Apostles, Moteto das Virgens (CPM 58), – Motet for the Virgins, and a Moteto para a Festa de Degolação de S. João Baptista (CPM 60), – Motet for the feast of the beheading of St John the Baptist. And in this year he composed also the Missa Para a Festa da Degolação de S. João Baptista (CPM 120), – Mass for the Feast of the Beheading of St. John the Baptist, which he completed in 20 days at the Royal Farm.

In 1819, the first daughter of prince Dom Pedro and the archduchess Leopoldina was born. She was baptized princess Maria da Glória, and later she would be Queen Maria II of Portugal. The Senate nominated Nunes Garcia to conduct the thanksgiving mass, celebrated in the church of St. Francis of Paula.

From the writings of 1820, there is a small number of Nunes Garcia's surviving works: one Creed in D Major (CPM 127) for voices and organ, the orchestration of the psalm Laudate Pueri Dominum (CPM 77), that he wrote in 1813, and the Missa Mimosa (CPM 111) – Gorgeous Mass. Probably at this time he composed the Matinas da Conceição de Nossa Senhora (CPM 174) – Matins of the Conception of Our Lady.

The year 1820 was marked by intense political activity in Portugal, as the people were demanding the immediate return of the royal family, which lead to the Liberal Revolution of 1820. The Portuguese aristocrats in Rio were also showing signs of dissatisfaction, as there were no longer any reasons to stay away from their own country.

== Brazilian independence ==
In April 1821, King John VI decided to return to Portugal. The political situation in his kingdom demanded the immediate return of the royal family, because the throne was at risk of being lost to his dynasty of Braganza. He left his son Pedro as regent of Brazil, to whom he said: "Pedro, if Brazil becomes independent, it must be for you, rather than for one of these adventurers, because I know you will respect me", and left Rio concerned about the future. Brazil was for him a new kingdom, of his own creation.

It was a sad day for Nunes Garcia. Despite the treatment he received from the Portuguese aristocracy, he regarded the King as an appreciator of his music. He received as a reward for his 13-year service to the court a tobacco box decorated with gold and precious gems, with the portrait of the King in ivory. Marcos Portugal stayed, or was left, in Brazil, not because of his own will, but probably because of his poor health, and in order to continue teaching music to the prince regent Pedro.

Sigismund Neukomm had departed for France a week before the King's trip to Portugal. Besides his own compositions while he was in Brazil, he made an important contribution to the history of Brazilian music, by putting onto paper some modinhas composed by Joaquim Manoel da Câmera, a popular singer and guitar player of that time. According to his witness at Porto Alegre, when he left Rio, Nunes Garcia was preparing a presentation of Haydn's The Creation which did not happen. Instead, he composed two psalms arranged upon themes of this work.

In this year 1821, Nunes Garcia also composed a Laudamus that recalls the music of Rossini, whose operas were beginning to make success in the theatres of Rio de Janeiro. The departure of the Portuguese court was a disaster for the country's public finances. The Portuguese aristocracy carried with them all they could, leaving the Bank of Brazil bankrupt. The financial difficulties forced the prince to cut the extra benefits that were conceded to the court musicians, including Nunes Garcia, keeping only their full wages.

The priest wrote a letter to the prince, requesting to be restored the extra benefit conceded by King John VI, justifying it as a payment for his public music teaching. Having his request denied, he decided to cease the public music classes he had given for 28 years.

The financial disorder set the Brazilians against the Portuguese merchants based in Rio, who were organized in a party to keep their own privileges. The Portuguese aristocracy in Lisbon was also pressing the king to sign an act that would retrieve from Brazil the status of United Kingdom. The prince regent Pedro, facing local upheavals, and in order to avoid the country being split into smaller republics, such as had happened in the Spanish Americas, on his way to the province of São Paulo, decided to declare the Brazilian independence of Portugal on September 7, 1822. On December 1, he was crowned Emperor Pedro I of Brazil.

From this crucial year, Nunes Garcia's sole surviving work is the Novena do Santíssimo Sacramento (CPM 75) – Novena of the Holy Sacrament. There are records that the village of Pindamonhangaba commissioned a Te Deum from him, which was presented to the prince regent in the thanksgiving mass for his passage by the village.

Portugal declared war on Brazil. The southern provinces were loyal to the Emperor, but Portugal still controlled the north. On March 21, 1823, the young Emperor decided to attack them with the Brazilian fleet commanded by the English admiral Lord Cochrane, who, mostly by bluff, managed to capture the greatest part of the vessels of the Portuguese fleet. There is only one known work by Nunes Garcia dating from 1823: the Missa Abreviada (CPM 113) – Abbreviated Mass. In this same year, the Royal Chapel was renamed the 'Imperial Chapel'.

== Final years ==
In 1825, a fire in the Royal Theatre turned the score of Le Due Gemelle into ashes. In 1826, the King died. (Recent research suggests he was assassinated by arsenic poisoning.) The news of his death caused great sorrow in Rio, especially for Nunes Garcia.

That year, two of his pupils, on behalf of the brotherhood of St. Cecília, commissioned from him a new mass with grand orchestra. The St. Cecilia Mass (CPM 113) was presented in November, and would be his last work. It is a monumental piece of music (some 276 pages long), and the score was later donated by his son Dr. José Mauricio Nunes Garcia as an admission fee to join the Brazilian Historical and Geographical Institute.

From 1826 until his death in 1830, Nunes Garcia dedicated himself to reviewing the orchestration of his greatest mass, and writing a Treatise of Harmony and Counterpoint, now lost. In 1828, he resigned to the title of Knight of the Habit of Christ, on behalf of his "nephew" José, the only one he recognized to be his son.

In the beginning of 1830, he was living in a small house at Rua do Núncio (nowadays República do Líbano street). In February 1830 Marcos Portugal died, and was buried in the Convent of St. Anthony. Nunes Garcia, perhaps guessing it was his own turn, made his bed to be put in the first floor of his house, so as "not to bother anyone". On April 18, his son and a slave being present with him, he died, whispering an anthem to Our Lady. The brotherhood of St. Cecília was responsible for the funeral mass, and he was buried in the church of São Pedro dos Clérigos. At the ceremony, a small orchestra performed his Funeral Symphony (CPM 230), composed 40 years earlier.

== Legacy ==
The chapel master was not forgotten by his pupils – they continued copying his works. The St. Cecilia Mass (CPM 113) was performed one second time in 1830. In 1831, Emperor Pedro I abdicated from the Brazilian throne on behalf of his son Pedro, then five years old. He embarked to England, to assemble a fleet to fight against his brother Miguel, who threatened to usurp the Portuguese throne of his daughter Maria da Glória.

A regency government was established in Brazil until the child's adulthood. Among its first acts was one that dissolved the Orchestra of the Imperial Chapel. Some of the dismissed musicians survived as music teachers, some as music copyists. But poverty was the fate for most of them. In 1840 prince Pedro, at 14, was crowned Emperor Pedro II. In 1842 he made the first steps to restore the musical activity at the Imperial Chapel, nominating Francisco Manuel da Silva, a former pupil of Nunes Garcia, as the Chapel Master. The repertory of the late Chapel Master was presented again, but reworked, in order to "be his music modernized".

Da Silva composed the music of the Brazilian national anthem, inspired by a recurrent motif in some of Nunes Garcia's sacred anthems. He also founded the Conservatório Imperial de Música, now the School of Music of the Federal University of Rio de Janeiro. In Campinas, São Paulo, Manuel José Gomes, the father of composer Carlos Gomes, gathered 14 of Nunes Garcia's compositions in a file.

Other important cities where Mauritian works were preserved are in the state of Minas Gerais. In São João D'El Rey, the Orquestra Lira Sanjoanense founded in 1776, has many copies, some of them unique, from various works of Nunes Garcia. And some copies of other works belong to Ribeiro Bastos Orchestra, in the same city. In Ouro Preto, the Museu da Inconfidência is the present owner of the score collection gathered by the German musicologist Francisco Curt Lange, which includes the authograph score of the Abbreviated Mass (CPM 112), written in 1823.

But the preservation of the greatest part of Nunes Garcia's remaining works has been done by Bento das Mercês, an archivist of the Imperial Chapel. He made precise copies of many of his works, creating a personal file that was later acquired from their heirs by the Brazilian government, and is now in the School of Music of the Federal University of Rio de Janeiro.

There are kept two more collections of scores: the one from the Royal Farm of Santa Cruz, and the other from Francisco Manuel da Silva. The first of the School's directors, Leopoldo Miguez, and composer Alberto Nepomuceno (1864–1920) studied and edited many of Nunes Garcia's scores.

Another of his admirers was Alfred D'Escragnolle, Viscount of Taunay, a grandson of Nicholas Antoine Taunay, member of the French Artistic Mission. Taunay wrote many articles and texts about the composer, and after he was elected to the house of therepresentatives in 1881, he presented in 1882 an act intended to trace all of Nunes Garcia's works, which was not approved.

His son Alfonse gathered his father's texts, which published in 1930 in the book A great glory from Brazil: José Mauricio Nunes Garcia. After Nepomuceno's death in 1920, live presentations of Nunes Garcia's works became rare. In 1930 his Requiem (CPM 185) was presented at the Candelária Church, conducted by composer Francisco Braga. This same work was performed in 1948, in the funeral mass of composer Lorenzo Fernandez.

In 1941, the researcher, musicologist and conductor Mrs. Cleofe Person de Mattos (1913–2002), professor at the School of Music of the Federal University of Rio de Janeiro, founded the Coro Pró-Arte, later Association of Choral Singing, a non-profit institution, whose goal was – and still is today – to perform Brazilian music, especially that of Nunes Garcia.

Mattos wrote and had it published by the Federal Council of Culture, in 1970, a Thematic Catalogue of Nunes Garcia's works, where she analyses in detail all of his remaining scores. In the decade of 1980, she helped publish, by Fundação Nacional de Arte (FUNARTE), a number of them. And finally in 1997, she published the book José Mauricio Nunes Garcia – Biografia, in which, despite her emotional treatment of the hardships the composer passed through, many events of his life, before obscure, have been made clear.

=== Present research and performance ===
In 2005, the music files of the Metropolitan Chapter of Rio de Janeiro, containing the scores of 55 works of Nunes Garcia and a number of works of other composers, was digitized and is now available on the web. Along with the scores, there were a number of administrative books, chiefly with payrolls and balance sheets of the finances of the Royal Chapel. In two of these payrolls there are records of pay bills to Nunes Garcia, up to the annual sum of R$625000 (six hundred twenty-five thousand réis) – about USD 20,000 in present money – that was his income from 1822 to 1830. The reported extreme poverty he faced in his last days is therefore just a hoax.

The School of Music of the Federal University of Rio de Janeiro also made part of their music files available on the internet.

On June 18, 2023, Nunes Garcia's Requiem had its Carnegie Hall premiere under the baton of Mark A. Boyle (Director of Choral and Vocal Activities at Seton Hill University, conducting the New England Symphonic Ensemble and a festival chorus of 135 voices. In October 2023 Nunes Garcia was the subject of the five-episode Composer of the Week on BBC Radio 3.
