= The Lost Tapes of Cogumelo =

Compilation album
- Released: 1990
- Genre: Thrash metal; death metal; black metal
- Length: 27:33
- Label: Cogumelo Records

The Lost Tapes of Cogumelo is a compilation released by the Brazilian label Cogumelo Records in 1990. which includes the following bands: Overdose, Holocausto, Sarcófago, Sepultura, Mutilator, and Chakal.

All of the bands featured on this compilation were or became very influential on the Brazilian thrash and death metal scene, and all of the songs available on it are demo tape material that could not be found anywhere else at the time of the album's release, what makes of this compilation a Brazilian equivalent to compilations such as the American Metal Massacre or the British Metal for Muthas.

== Track listing ==
1. Overdose: "Última Estrela" (4:34)
2. Holocausto: "Massacre" (4:22)
3. Sarcófago: "Christ's Death" (3:31)
4. Sarcófago: "Satanic Lust" (3:08)
5. Sepultura: "Necromancer" (4:11)
6. Mutilator: "Evil Conspiracy" (2:20)
7. Mutilator: "Visions of Darkness" (2:27)
8. Chakal: "Children Sacrifice" (3:00)
