= Music of Brazil =

The music of Brazil encompasses various regional musical styles influenced by European, American, African and Amerindian forms. Brazilian music developed some unique and original styles such as forró, repente, coco de roda, axé, sertanejo, samba, bossa nova, MPB, gaucho music, pagode, tropicália, choro, maracatu, embolada (coco de repente), frevo, brega, modinha and Brazilian versions of foreign musical styles, such as rock, pop music, soul, hip-hop, disco music, country music, ambient, industrial and psychedelic music, rap, classical music, fado, and gospel.

Samba has become the most known form of Brazilian music worldwide, especially because of the country's carnival, although bossa nova, which had João Gilberto as one of its most acclaimed composers and performers, has received much attention abroad.

The first four winners of the Shell Brazilian Music prize have each left a legacy on Brazilian music and are among the representatives of Brazilian popular music: Pixinguinha (choro), Antônio Carlos Jobim (bossa nova), Dorival Caymmi (samba and samba-canção), and Luiz Gonzaga (forró).

Instrumental music is also largely practiced in Brazil, with styles ranging from classical to popular and jazz influenced forms. Among the later, Naná Vasconcelos, Pixinguinha, Hermeto Pascoal and Egberto Gismonti are significant figures. Notable classical composers include Heitor Villa-Lobos, Carlos Gomes and Cláudio Santoro. The country also has a growing community of modern/experimental composition, including electroacoustic music.

== History ==
=== Art music ===
==== Origins ====
Little is known of the music of Brazil before the area's first encounter with Portuguese explorers on 22 April 1500. During the colonial period, documents detail the musical activities of the major Roman Catholic cathedrals and the parlors of the upper classes, but data about musical life outside these domains are sparse. Some information is available in writings left by such travelers as Jean de Léry, who lived in Brazil from 1557 to 1558 and produced the first known writings of native American music: two chants of the Tupinambá, near Rio de Janeiro.

Venid a sospirar (José de Anchieta) - score available at Musica Brasilis website.

Further registration of musical activity in Brazil came from the activities of two Jesuit priests in 1549. Ten years later, they had already founded settlements for indigenous people (the Reduções), with a musical-educational structure.

One century later, the Reduções of the southern Brazil, which were founded by Spaniard Jesuits, had a strong cultural development, where some music schools were founded. Some of the reports of that time show the fascination of the indigenous people for European music. The indigenous people also took part in the music, with both the construction of musical instruments and practice of vocal and instrumental performance.

==== The 18th-century school ====
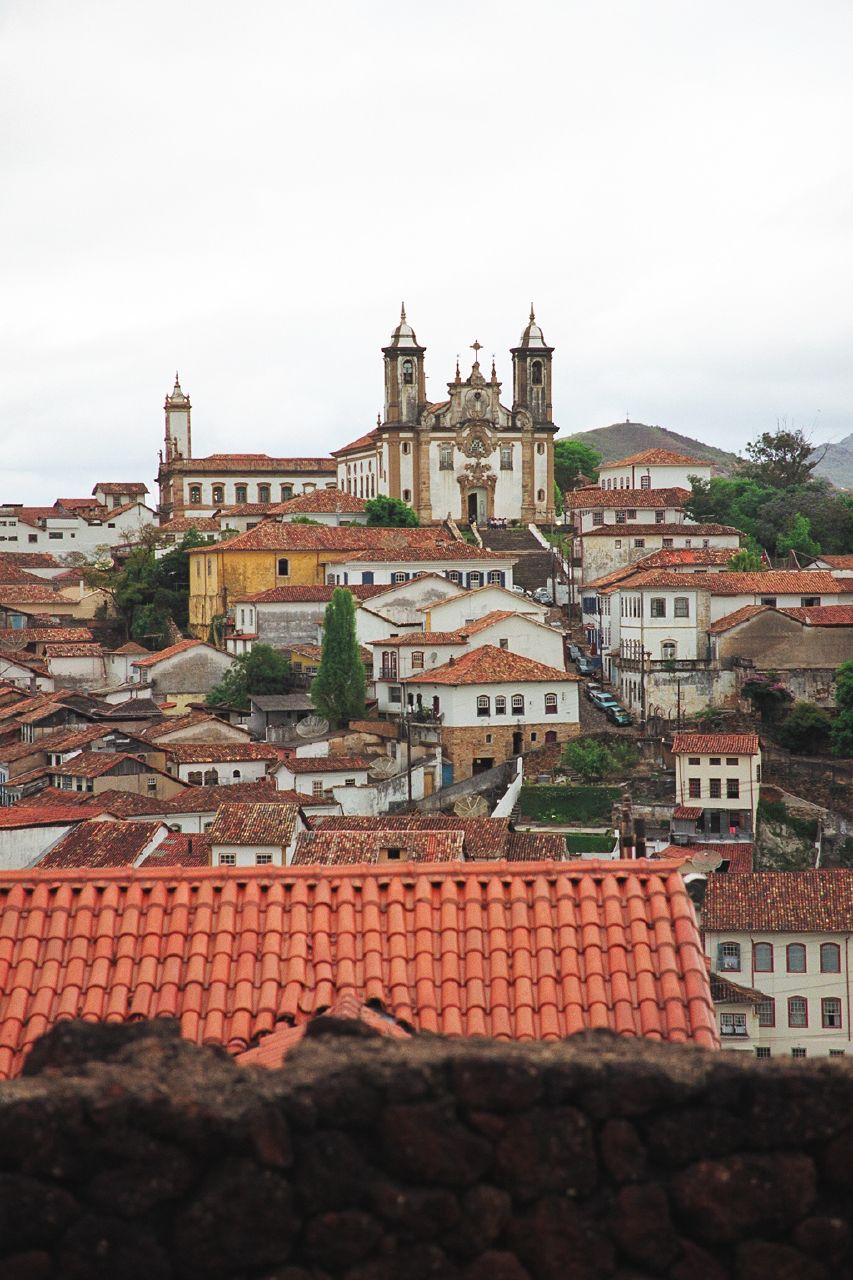
Ouro Preto, in Minas Gerais: one of the most important musical centers in Brazil during the 18th century.

In the 18th century, there was intense musical activity in all the more developed regions of Brazil, with their moderately stable institutional and educational structures. The previously few private orchestras became more common and the churches presented a great variety of music.

In the first half of this century, the most outstanding works were composed by Luís Álvares Pinto, Caetano de Mello de Jesus and Antônio José da Silva ("the Jew"), who became successful in Lisbon writing librettos for comedies, which were performed also in Brazil with music by António Teixeira.

In the second part of the 18th century, there was a great flourishing in Minas Gerais, mostly in the regions of Vila Rica (currently Ouro Preto), Mariana and Arraial do Tejuco (currently Diamantina), where the mining of gold and diamonds for the Portuguese metropolis attracted a sizable population. At this time, the first outstanding Brazilian composers were revealed, most of them mulattoes. The musical pieces were mostly sacred music. Some of the noteworthy composers of this period were Lobo de Mesquita, Manoel Dias de Oliveira, Francisco Gomes da Rocha, Marcos Coelho Neto and Marcos Coelho Neto Filho. All of them were very active, but in many cases few pieces have survived until the present day. Some of the most famous pieces of this period are the Magnificat by Manoel Dias de Oliveira and the Our Lady's Antiphon by Lobo de Mesquita. In the city of Arraial do Tejuco, nowadays Diamantina, there were ten conductors in activity. In Ouro Preto about 250 musicians were active, and in all of the territory of Minas Gerais almost a thousand musicians were active.

With the impoverishment of the mines at the end of the century, the focus of the musical activity changed to other centers, specially Rio de Janeiro and São Paulo, where André da Silva Gomes, a composer of Portuguese origin, released a great number of works and dynamized the musical life of the city.

Also, the oldest Orchestra of all Americas is situated in São João del-Rei, Minas Gerais, called Lira Sanjoanense, conducted, today, by Modesto Flávio Fonseca.

==== The Classical period ====
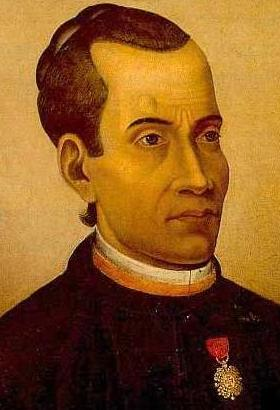
José Maurício Nunes Garcia.

A crucial factor for the changes in the musical life was the arrival of the Portuguese Royal family to Rio de Janeiro in 1808. Until then, Rio de Janeiro was musically similar to other cultural centers of Brazil but was even less important than Minas Gerais. The presence of the Portuguese Royal family, in exile, radically changed this situation, as the Capela Real of Rio de Janeiro was established.

The king John VI of Portugal brought with him to Brazil the great musical library from the House of Bragança, one of the best of Europe at that time, and ordered the arrival of musicians from Lisbon and the castrati from Italy, re-ordering the Royal Chapel. Later, John VI ordered the construction of a sumptuous theater, called the Royal Theater of São João. The secular music had the presence of Marcos Portugal, who was designated as the official composer of the household, and of Sigismund von Neukomm, who contributed with his own work and brought the works of the Austrian composers Wolfgang Amadeus Mozart and Joseph Haydn. The works of these composers strongly influenced the Brazilian music of this time.

José Maurício Nunes Garcia, the first of the great Brazilian composers, emerged at this time. With a large culture for his origin – he was poor and mulatto – he was one of the founders of the Irmandade de Santa Cecília, in Rio de Janeiro, teacher and mestre de capela of the Royal Chapel during the presence of John VI in Brazil. Nunes Garcia was the most prolific Brazilian composer of this time. He also composed the first opera written in Brazil, Le Due Gemelle (The Two Twins), with text in Italian, but the music is now lost.

Other important composers of this period are Gabriel Fernandes da Trindade, who composed the only Brazilian chamber music from the 19th century which has survived to the present times, and João de Deus de Castro Lobo, who lived in the cities of Mariana and Ouro Preto, which were decadent at this time.

This period, however, was brief. In 1821, John VI went back to Lisbon, taking with him the household, and the cultural life in Rio de Janeiro became empty. And, despite the love of Peter I of Brazil for the music – he was also author of some musical pieces like the Brazilian Independence Anthem – the difficult financial situation did not allow many luxuries. The conflagration of the Royal Theater in 1824 was another symbol of decadence, which reached the most critical point when Peter I renounced the throne, going back to Portugal.

==== The Romantic period ====
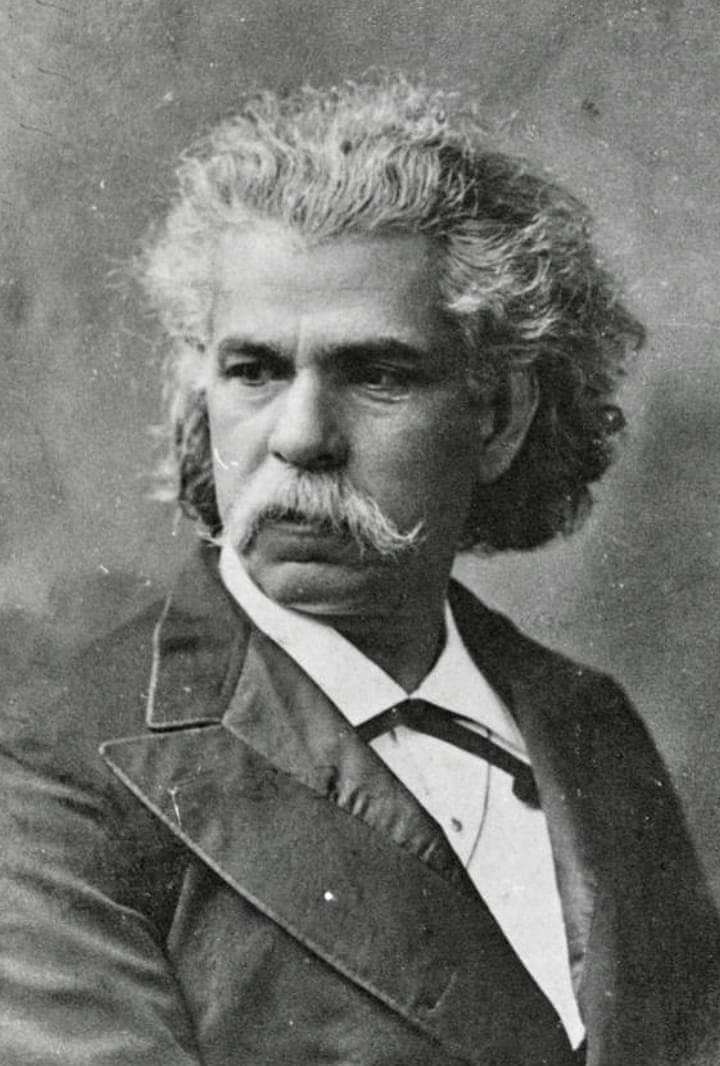
Antônio Carlos Gomes.

The only composer who had a relevant work in this period was Francisco Manuel da Silva, disciple of Nunes Garcia, who succeeded him as kapellmeister. In spite of his few resources, he founded the Musical Conservatory of Rio de Janeiro. He was the author of the Brazilian National Anthem's melody. His work reflected the musical transition for the Romanticism, when the interest of the national composers was focused in the opera. The most outstanding Brazilian composer of this period was Antônio Carlos Gomes, who composed Italian-styled operas with national themes, such as Il Guarany (based on José de Alencar's novel O Guarani) and Lo Schiavo. These operas were very successful in European theaters, like the Teatro alla Scala, in Milan. Other important composer of this time is Elias Álvares Lobo, who wrote the opera A Noite de São João, the first Brazilian opera with text in Portuguese.

The opera in Brazil was very popular until the middle of the 20th century, and many opera houses were built at this time, like Teatro Amazonas in Manaus, Municipal Theater of Rio de Janeiro, Municipal Theater of São Paulo, and many others.

At the end of the 19th century, the greatest composers for the symphonic music were revealed. One of the most outstanding name of this period was Leopoldo Miguez, who followed the Wagnerian style and Henrique Oswald, who incorporated elements of the French Impressionism.

==== Nationalism ====
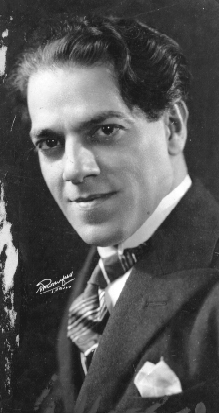
Heitor Villa-Lobos.

In the beginning of the 20th century, there was a movement for creating an authentically Brazilian music, with less influences of the European culture. In this sense, the folklore was the major font of inspiration for the composers. Some composers like Brasílio Itiberê da Cunha, Luciano Gallet and Alexandre Levy, despite having a European formation, included some typically Brazilian elements in their works. This trend reached the highest point with Alberto Nepomuceno, who used largely the rhythms and melodies from the Brazilian folklore. There were local cultural movements to consolidate regional identities through music as for example, José Brazilício de Souza, who wrote the state anthem of Santa Catarina and his son Álvaro Sousa, who was a noticeable musician, music educator, and composer there.

An important event, later, was the Modern Art Week, in 1922, which had a large impact on concepts of national art. In this event the composer Heitor Villa-Lobos, regarded as the most outstanding name of the Brazilian nationalism, was revealed.

Villa-Lobos did researches about the musical folklore of Brazil, and mixed elements both from classical and popular music. He explored many musical genres such as concertos, symphonies, modinhas, Fados, and other symphonic, vocal and chamber music. Some of his masterworks are the ballet Uirapuru and the two series of Chôros and Bachianas Brasileiras.

Other composers of Brazilian national music of this era include Oscar Lorenzo Fernández, Radamés Gnattali, Camargo Guarnieri, Osvaldo Lacerda, Francisco Mignone, and Ernesto Nazareth.

==== The avant-garde movement ====
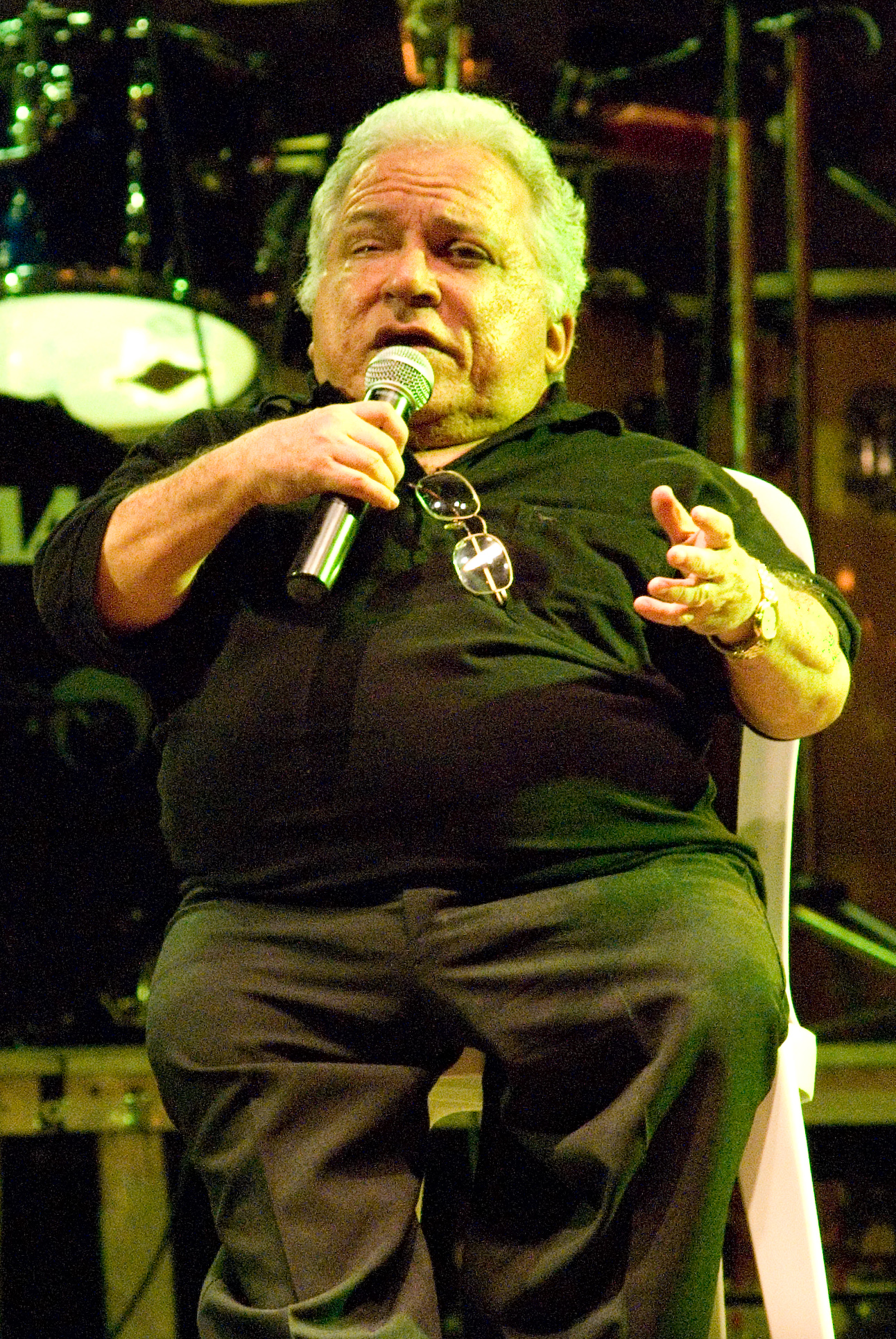
Nelson Ned, the "Little Giant of Song".

As a reaction against the nationalist school, who was identified as "servile" to the centralizing politics of Getúlio Vargas, in 1939 the Movimento Música Viva (Living Music Movement) appeared, led by Hans Joachim Koellreutter and by Egídio de Castro e Silva, defending the adoption of an international style, derived from the dodecaphonism of Arnold Schoenberg. This group was integrated by composers like Cláudio Santoro, César Guerra-Peixe, Eunice Catunda and Edino Krieger. Koellreutter adopted revolutionary methodes, in respect to the individuality of each student and giving to the students the freedom of creativity before the knowledge of the traditional rules for composition. The movement edited a magazine and presented a series of radio programs showing their fundaments and works of contemporary music. Later, Guerra-Peixe and Santoro followed an independent way, centered in the regional music. Other composers, who used freely the previous styles were Marlos Nobre, Almeida Prado, and Armando Albuquerque, who created their own styles.

After 1960, the Brazilian avant-garde movement received a new wave, focusing on serial music, microtonal music, concrete music and electronic music, employing a completely new language. This movement was called Música Nova (New Music) and was led by Gilberto Mendes and Willy Corrêa de Oliveira. An important fact was the introduction of electronic music in Brazil, with the pioneering works of the carioca Jorge Antunes in 1961.

==== Brazilian Opera ====
Carlos Gomes was the first composer on non-European origin to achieve wide recognition in the classical music environment of the Golden age of Opera in Italy. Bossa Nova was created as anti-opera in a time when opera seemed to represent the art-form of the elite. [5] In recent years the style has been revived with works by Jorge Antunes, Flo Menezes, and others.

Since 2014 the International Brazilian Opera (IBOC) has been producing new works, most notably by its artistic director and resident composer Joao MacDowell.

==== Contemporary ====
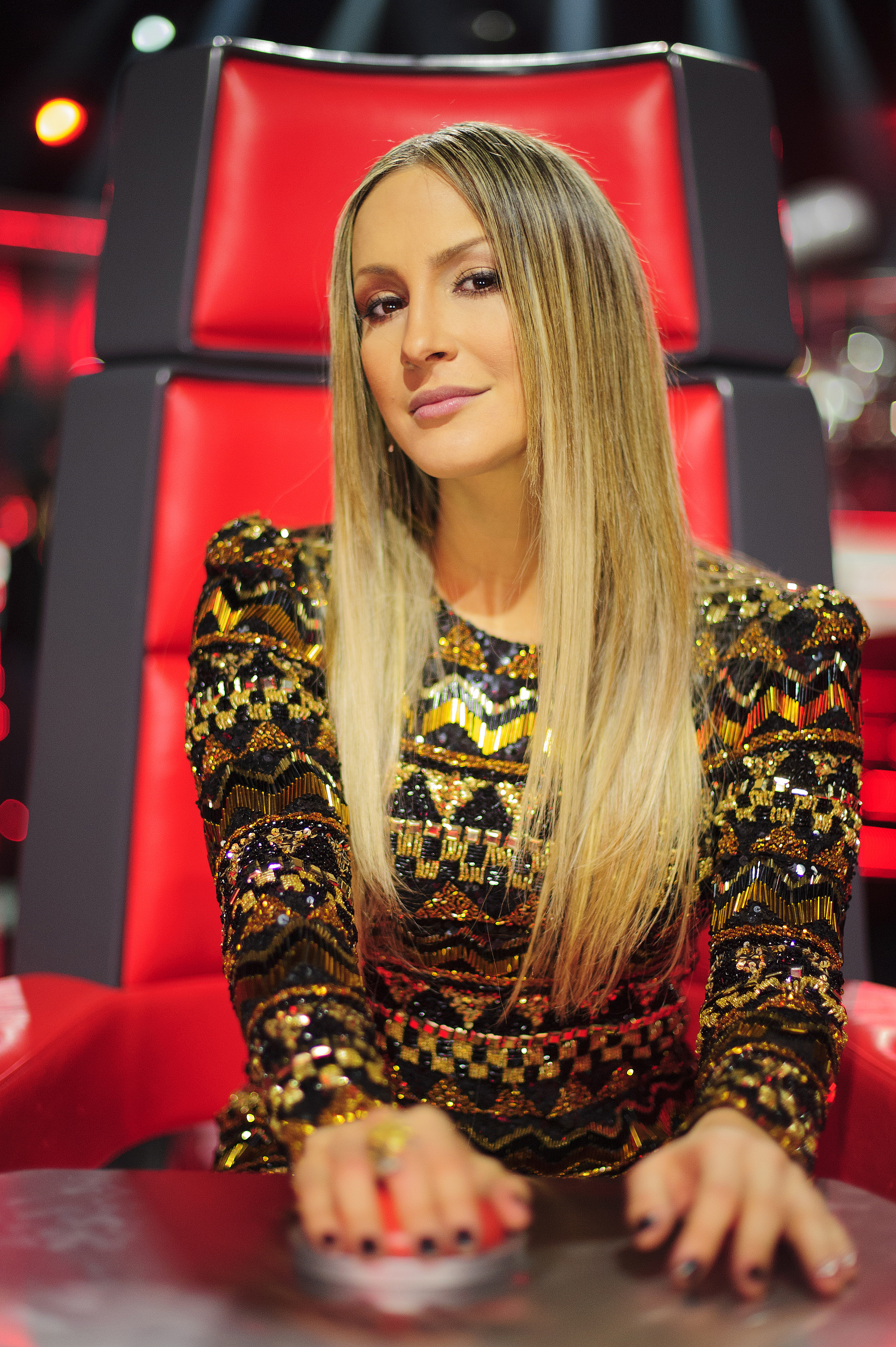
Claudia Leitte, along with Pitbull and Jennifer Lopez, recorded "We Are One (Ole Ola)", which served as the official song of the 2014 FIFA World Cup.

Nowadays, Brazilian music follows the guidelines of both experimentalism and traditional music. Some of the contemporary Brazilian composers are Amaral Vieira, Sílvio Ferraz, Guilherme Bauer, Ronaldo Miranda, David Koenchendler, Nestor de Hollanda Cavalcanti, Ernani Aguiar, Flo Menezes, Marcos Balter, Alexandre Lunsqui, Rodolfo Caesar, Felipe Lara, Edson Zampronha, Marcus Siqueira, Rodrigo Lima, Jorge Antunes, Roberto Victorio and João MacDowell. From the new generation of Brazilian composers, Caio Facó has achieved international recognition for his work.

Brazil has a large number of internationally recognized orchestras and performers, despite the relatively low support of the government. The most famous Brazilian orchestra is probably the São Paulo State Symphony Orchestra, currently under conductor Thierry Fischer. Other Brazilian orchestras worthy of note are the São Paulo University Symphony, the Orquestra Sinfônica Brasileira, Orquestra Filarmônica de Minas Gerais and the Petrobras Sinfônica, supported by the Brazilian state oil company Petrobras.

There are also regular operas scheduled every year in cities such as São Paulo and Rio de Janeiro. The state of São Paulo also hosts the Winter Festival in the city of Campos do Jordão.

Some of the most famous Brazilian conductors are Roberto Minczuk, John Neschling and Isaac Karabtchevsky. The instrumentalists include, among others: Roberto Szidon, Antonio Meneses, Cussy de Almeida, Gilberto Tinetti, Arnaldo Cohen, Nelson Freire, Eudóxia de Barros, Guiomar Novaes and Magda Tagliaferro. And some of the most famous Brazilian singers were, historically, Zola Amaro, Constantina Araújo and Bidu Sayão; living singers include Eliane Coelho, Kismara Pessatti, Maria Lúcia Godoy, Sebastião Teixeira, and others.

In the 1980s, a wave of Brazilian heavy metal bands gained public attention. The most commercially successful of these was Sepultura, founded in São Paulo in 1983, preceded by Dorsal Atlantica and followed by Sarcófago.

The intrusion of alien elements into Brazil's cultural system is not a destructive process. The return of a democratic government allowed for freedom of expression. The Brazilian music industry opened up to international styles and this has allowed for both foreign and local genres to co-exist and identify people. Each different style relates to the people socially, politically, and economically. "Brazil is a regionally divided country with a rich cultural and musical diversity among states. As such, musicians in the country choose to define their local heritage differently depending on where they come from." This shows how globalization has not robbed Brazil of its identity but instead given it the ability to represent its people both in Brazil and the rest of the world.

In recent years Brazilian artists have become more interested in Africa, the Caribbean and their own indigenous and folk music. While there are some artists who continue to perform rock and Western pop, there are now just as many contemporaries playing a fusion of African and European influences with those from across The Americas. Some artists have even become influenced by Asian music, noticing some parallels between music from the Northeast of Brazil and music from India.

== Indigenous and folk music ==
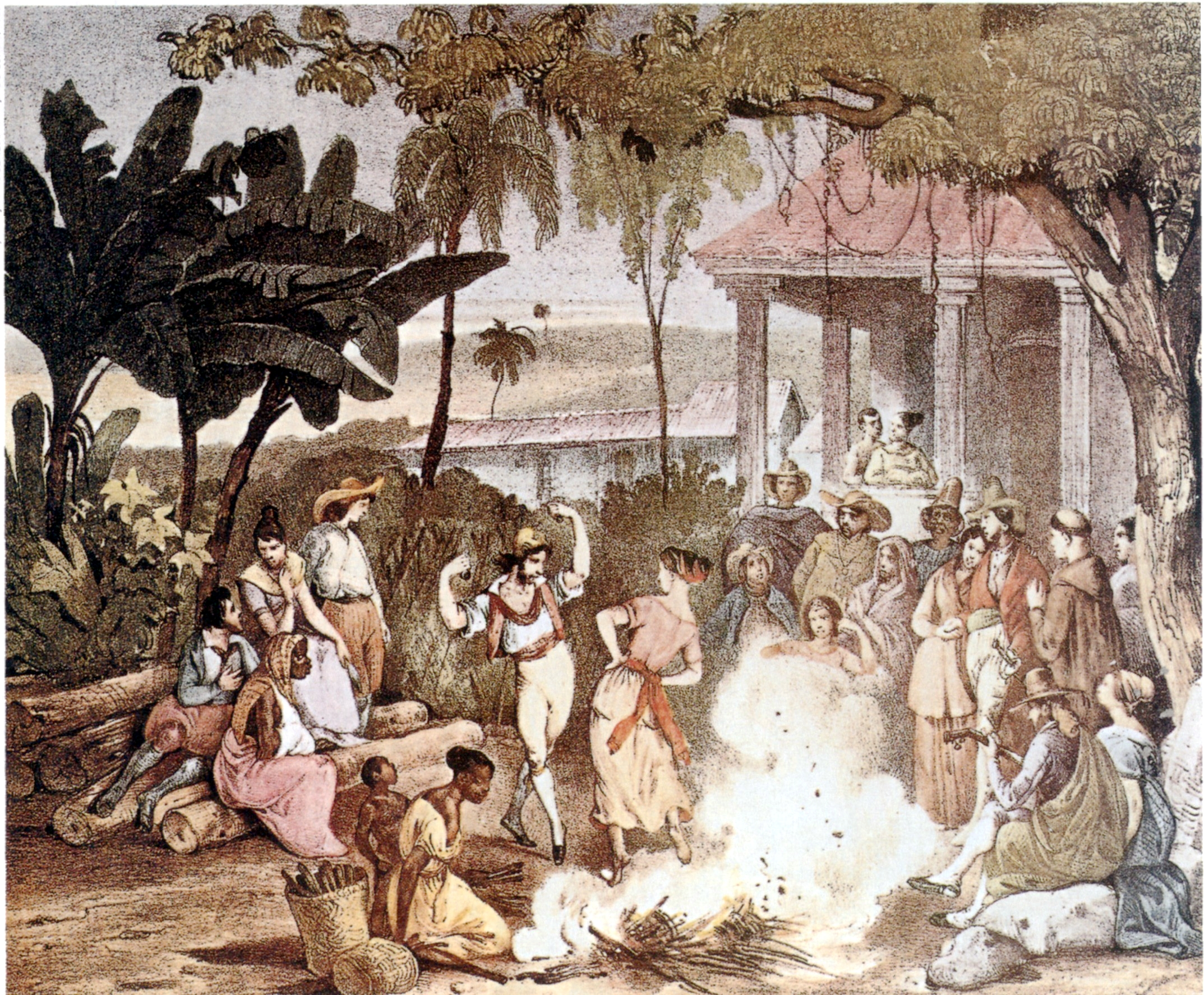
Brazilian dance-song lundu, c. 1835.

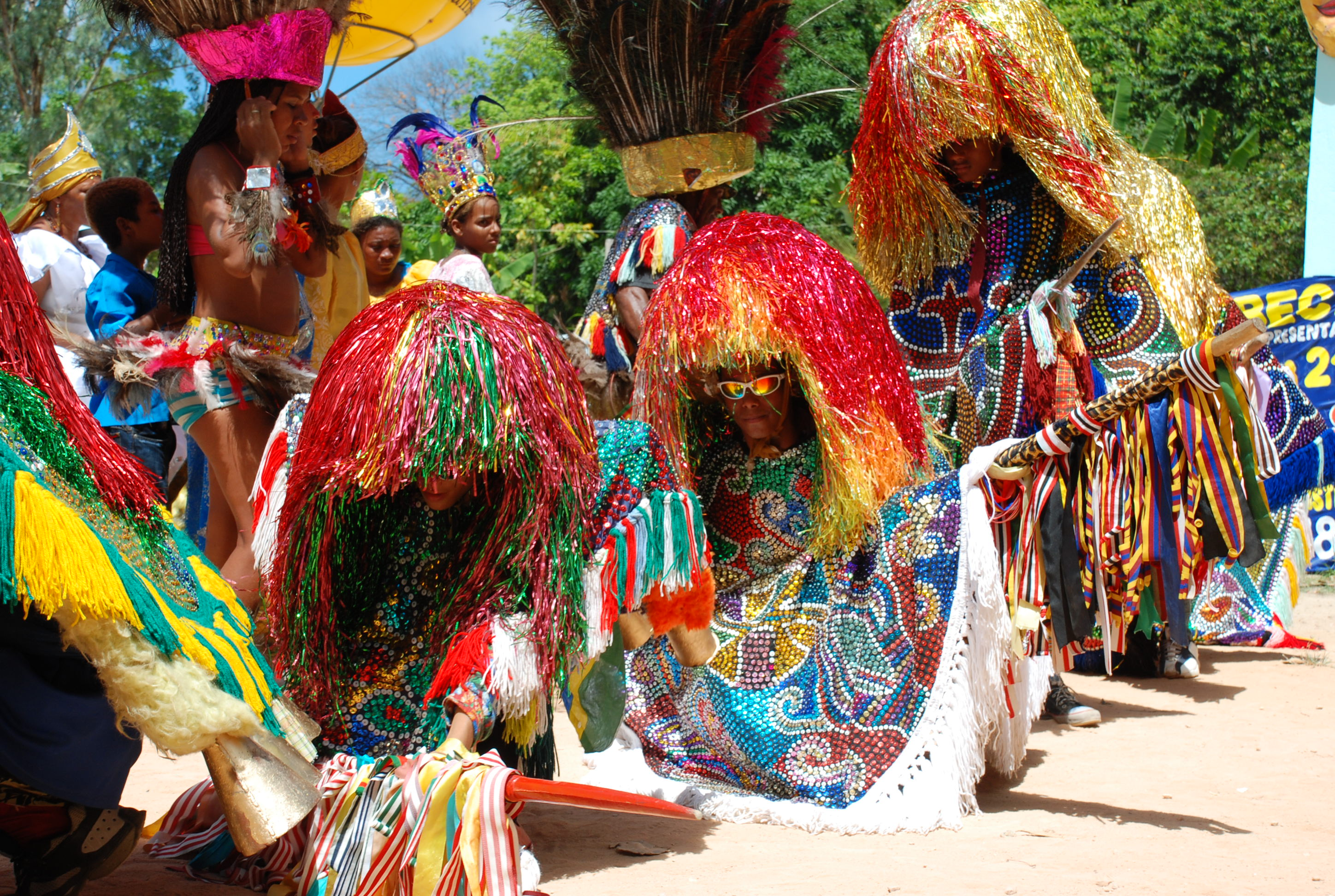
Maracatu.

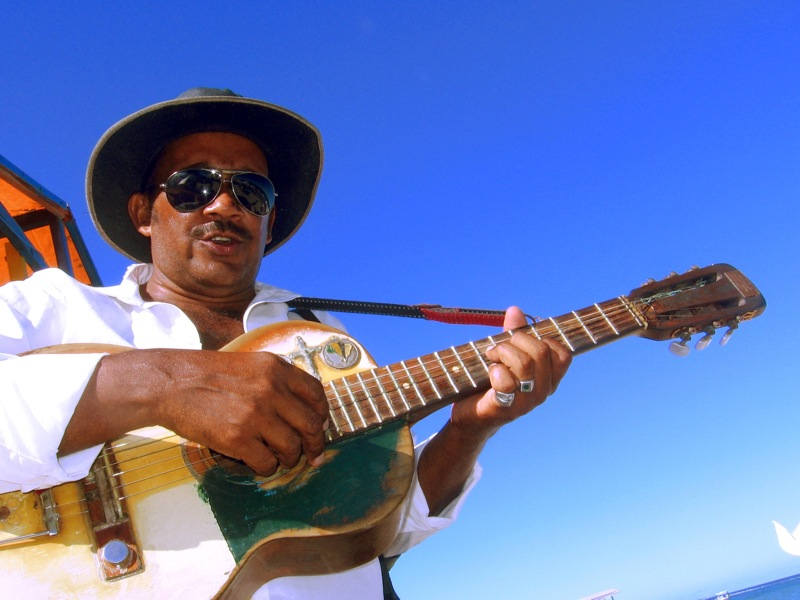
Repentista.

The native peoples of the Brazilian rainforest play instruments including whistles, flutes, horns, drums and rattles. Much of the area's folk music imitates the sounds of the Amazon rainforest. When the Portuguese arrived in Brazil, the first natives they met played an array of reed flutes and other wind and percussion instruments.

The Jesuit missionaries introduced songs which used the Tupi language with Christian lyrics, an attempt to convert the people to Christianity, and also introduced Gregorian chant and the flute, bow, and the clavichord.

=== Capoeira music ===
The Afro-Brazilian sport of capoeira is never played without its own music, which is usually considered to be a call-and-response type of folk music. The main instruments of capoeira music include the berimbau, the atabaque and the pandeiro. Capoeira songs may be improvised on the spot, or they may be popular songs written by older, and ancient mestres (teachers), and often include accounts of the history of capoeira, or the doings of great mestres.

=== Maracatu ===
This type of music is played primarily in the Recife and Olinda regions during Carnaval. It is an Afro-Brazilian tradition. The music serves as the backdrop for parade groups that evolved out of ceremonies conducted during colonial times in honour of the Kings of Congo, who were African slaves occupying symbolic leadership positions among the slave population. The music is played on large alfaia drums, large metal gonguê bells, snare drums and shakers.

An important variant is found in and around Fortaleza, Ceará (called maracatu cearense), which is different from the Recife/Olinda tradition in many respects: triangles are used instead of gonguês, surdos or zabumbas instead of alfaias. Also, important female characters are performed by cross-dressed male performers, and all African and Afrobrazilian personages are performed using blackface makeup.

=== Afoxé ===
Afoxé is the name given to a group dedicated to playing ijexá, which is a kind of religious music, part of the Candomblé tradition. In 1949, a group called Filhos de Gandhi began playing afoxé during carnaval parades in Salvador; their name translates as Sons of Gandhi, associating black Brazilian activism with Mahatma Gandhi's Indian independence movement.

The Filhos de Gandhi's 1949 appearance was also revolutionary because, until then, the Carnaval parades in Salvador were meant only for light-skinned people.

=== Repente ===
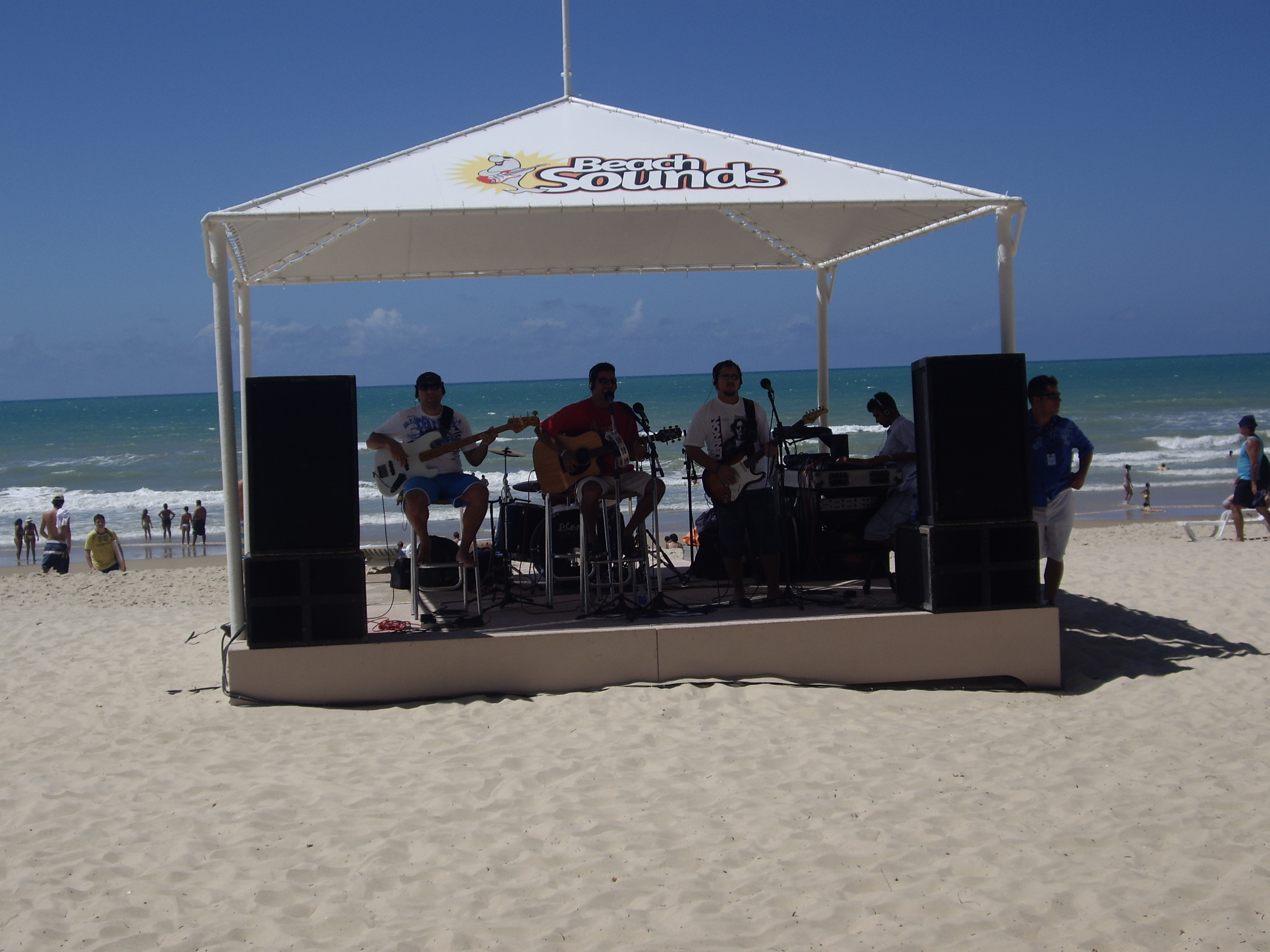
Brazilians musics in Fortaleza.

Northeastern Brazil is known for a distinctive form of literature called literatura de cordel, which are a type of ballads that include elements incorporated into music as "repentismo", an improvised lyrical contest on themes suggested by the audience.

Similar to Repentismo, appears among the Caipira culture a musical form derived from viola caipira, which is called cururu.

It's also important to note that Brazil has the largest Black population outside of Africa, which is a major reason why African heritage is one of the central driving forces behind Brazilian music.

== Popular music ==
=== Choro ===
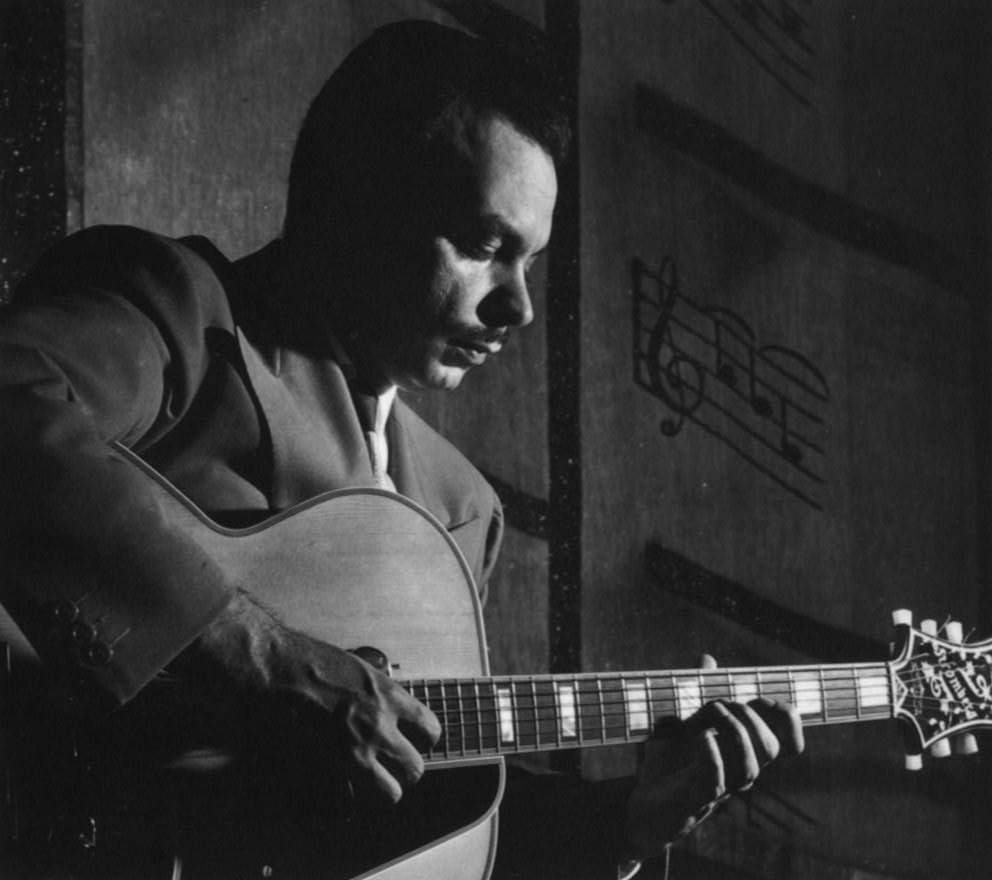
Laurindo Almeida.

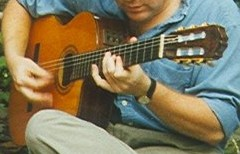
Choro guitar.

Urubu Malandro
"Urubu Malandro", recorded in 1930 by Pixinguinha in the flute

Harmonia Selvagem
Choro "Harmonia Selvagem" composed by Dante Santoro. Recorded by Dante Santoro (flute) in 1938.

Atraente
"Atraente", composed by Chiquinha Gonzaga, recorded by Pixinguinha (saxophone) and Benedito Lacerda (flute).

Choro (literally "cry" in Portuguese, but in context a more appropriate translation would be "lament"), traditionally called chorinho ("little cry" or "little lament"). Instrumental, its origins are in 19th century Rio de Janeiro. Choro was the first Brazilian national musical style to develop in Rio de Janeiro around 1870 and spread to the country with the invention of disco in 1888. Before choro, the most popular rhythms were modinha and lundu, but modinha was a rhythm originally from Portugal and lundu was a rhythm originating from Angola. It emerged from the fusion of popular European dance music, such as polka, waltz, mazurka, xote and quadrilhas, with Afro-Brazilian music, for example, lundu. After the proclamation of the Republic of Brazil in 1889, military and metal bands included choros in their repertoire. It was played and danced mainly by the lower middle class. It had its peak between 1870 and 1920.

Originally choro was played by a trio of flute, guitar and cavaquinho (a small chordophone with four strings). The young pianist Ernesto Nazareth published his first choro (Não Caio Noutra) in 1878 at the age of 14. Nazareth's choros are often listed as polkas; he also composed waltzes, schottisches, milongas and Brazilian Tangos. (He resisted the popular term maxixe to represent Brazilian tango.) Chiquinha Gonzaga was another important composer of choros and started shortly after Nazareth. Chiquinha Gonzaga composed her first success, the polka-choro "Atraente", in 1877. In the beginning, the success of choro came from informal groups of friends which played in parties, pubs (botecos), streets, home balls (forrobodós), and also the musical scores published by print houses. By the 1910s, much of the Brazilian first phonograph records are choros. The mainstream success of this style of music (By the 1930s) came from the early days of radio, when bands performed live on the air. By the 1950s and 1960s it was replaced by samba and Bossa Nova and other styles of Brazilian popular music, but was still alive in amateur circles called "rodas de choro" (informal choro gatherings in residences and botecos). However, in the late 1970s there was a successful effort to revitalize the genre carried out by some famous artists: Pixinguinha, Waldir Azevedo and Jacob do Bandolim.

=== Samba ===
Samba as a musical genre emerged in the early 20th century in Rio de Janeiro, although the term had already been used since at least 1830 to designate manifestations originating from batuque, such as the coco circle. It received influences from samba de roda, modinha, maxixe, and lundu. Batuque was a dance that developed from Afro-Brazilian predecessors such as jongo, semba de Angola, and lundu. These dances were accompanied by drums. The term samba probably dates back to semba (an Angolan musical rhythm). Initially, it was a type of music identified with people from the humblest strata and had its main center in the Rio de Janeiro neighborhood of Estácio de Sá, but it soon left the improvisational circles and joint creations of the Rio de Janeiro hills and was elevated to the status of a more "typically" Brazilian musical genre. Contributing to this was the first recording of a samba, "Pelo Telefone," released in 1917, which was a national success.

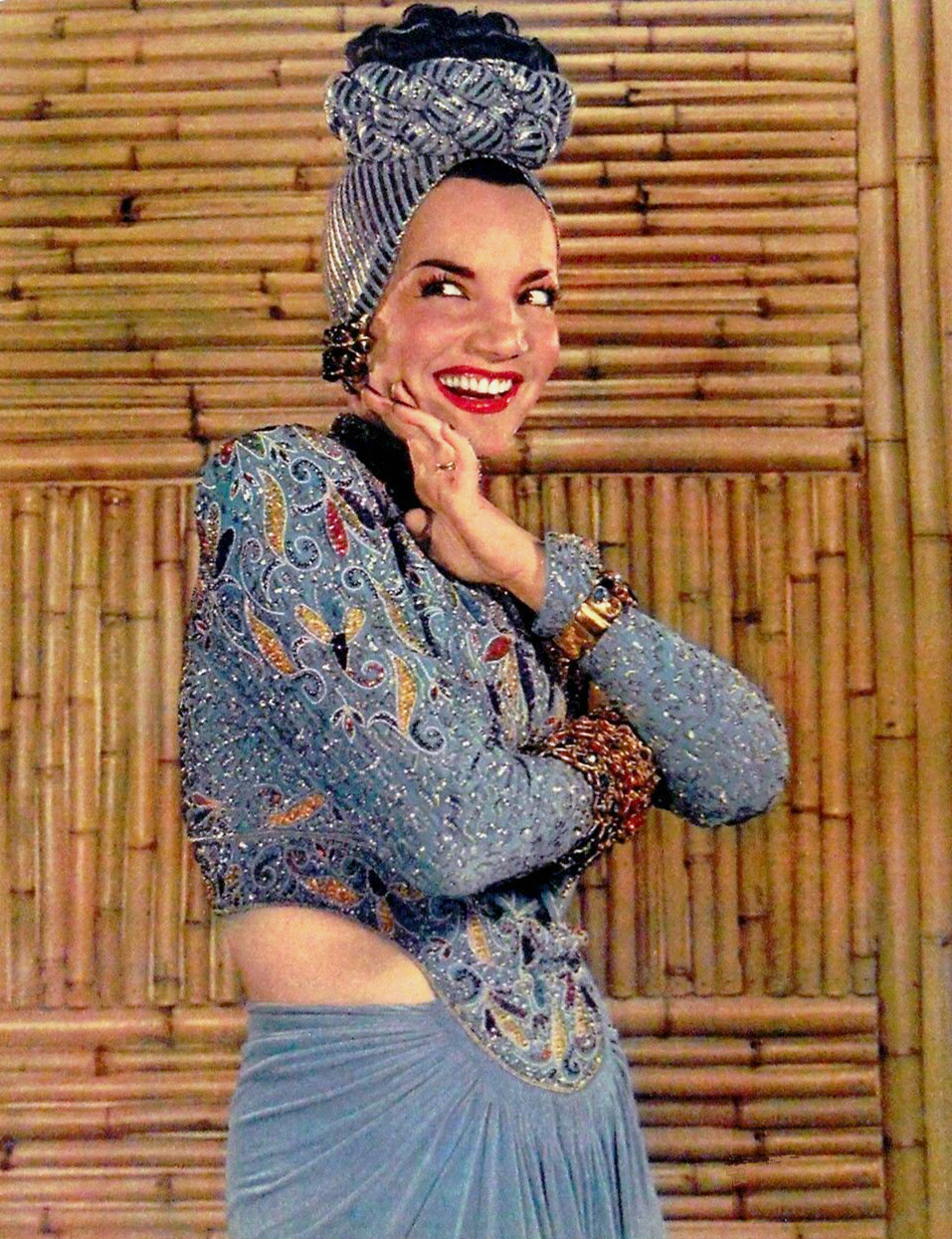
Singer and actress Carmen Miranda.

In 1929, prompted by the opening of the first radio station in Rio de Janeiro, the so-called radio era began spreading songs – especially the novelty Samba in its current format – to larger masses. This period was dominated by few male interpreters – notably Almirante, Braguinha, Mário Reis, Sílvio Caldas, Francisco Alves and singer/composer Noel Rosa and even fewer chanteuses such as Aracy de Almeida and sisters Aurora Miranda and Carmen Miranda, who eventually came to Hollywood becoming a movie star.

Na Pavuna
Almirante, released in 1929.

Alô... Alô?
Carmen Miranda and Mário Reis, released in 1934

Samba reached middle-class circles. Samba-canção emphasized melody more, had a much slower tempo, and more refined lyrics. With the advent of radio, samba spread very quickly and became the musical pulse of the country in the 1930s.

Popular music included instruments like cuicas, tambourines, frying pans ('played' with a metal stick), flutes and guitars. Noteworthy Samba composers at this early stage included said Noel Rosa plus Lamartine Babo and, around World War II time, Ary Barroso.

From World War II to the mid-1960s it was developed the samba-canção subgenre, with male singers such as Orlando Silva, Nelson Gonçalves, Jamelão, Ataulfo Alves, Ismael Silva, Miltinho and female singers started to mushroom: Nora Ney, Dolores Duran, Ângela Maria, Emilinha Borba, Marlene, Dalva de Oliveira, Maysa Matarazzo, sisters Linda Batista and Dircinha Batista, among others.

In the late 1970s, the pagode subgenre emerged, which is played in small groups.

=== MPB (Brazilian popular music) ===
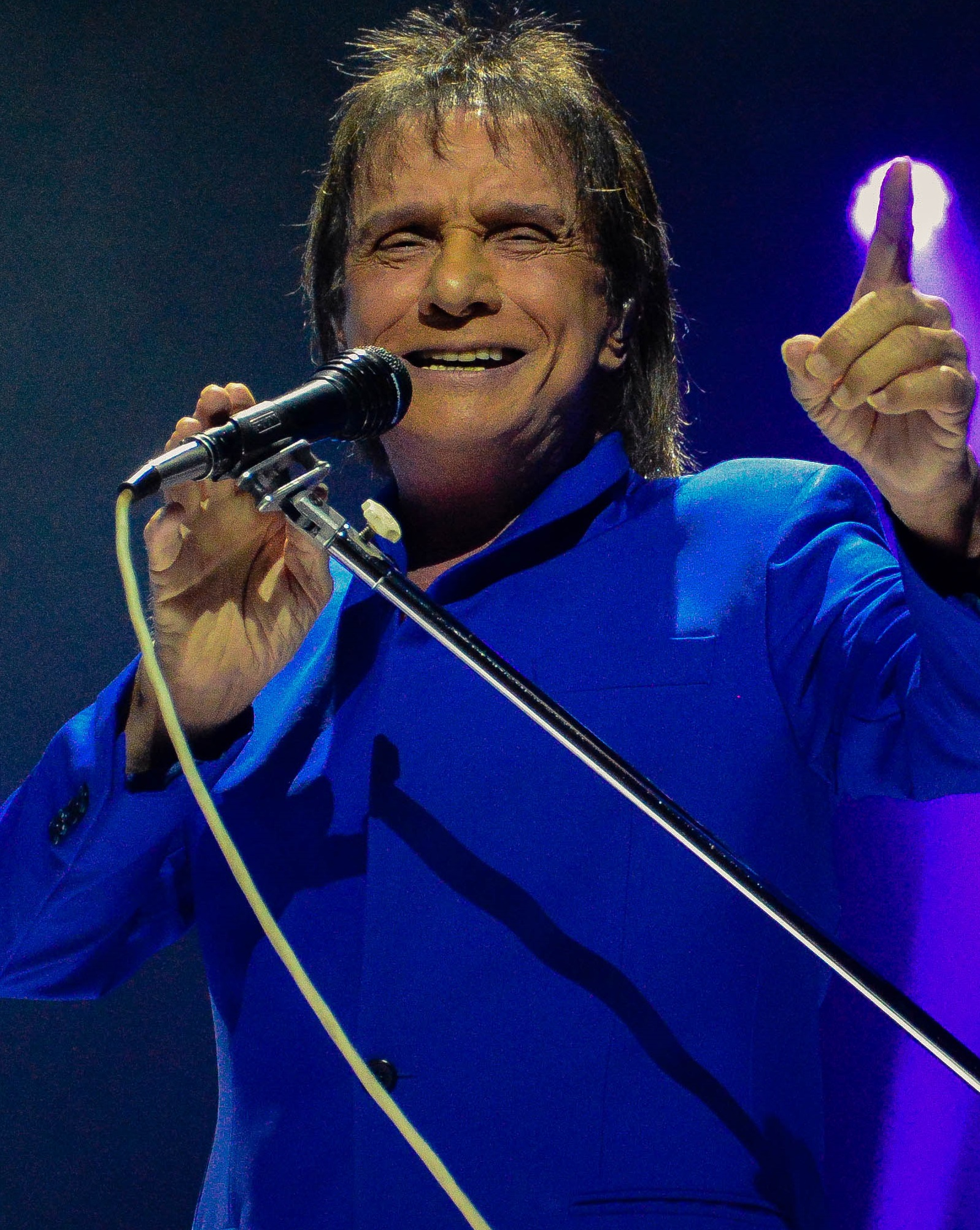
Roberto Carlos.

Música Popular Brasileira, or MPB, is a musical genre that emerged in Brazil in the mid-1960s. MPB emerged from 1966 onwards in the city of Rio de Janeiro with the second generation of bossa nova, but with a strong influence from Brazilian folklore that had already been present since 1932.

In practice, the acronym MPB (Brazilian Popular Music) announced a fusion of two musical movements that had previously diverged: bossa nova and the folkloric engagement of the Popular Culture Centers of the National Union of Students. The former advocated musical sophistication, while the latter championed fidelity to traditional Brazilian music. Their purposes merged, and with the 1964 Brazilian coup d'état, the two movements became a broad cultural front against the military dictatorship, adopting the acronym MPB as their banner of struggle.

Jovem Guarda and Tropicália are musical movements that are part of MPB (Brazilian Popular Music), but Tropicália identified more with MPB than Jovem Guarda due to its mixture of national and international rhythms. MPB began with a markedly nationalist profile, but it changed and incorporated elements from various origins, partly due to the musicians' lack of resistance to mixing musical genres.

Since the term MPB emerged in the late 1960s, this style has incorporated not only the country's regional musical styles, but also North American, Caribbean and European influences, such as blues, jazz, reggae, rock and pop. A characteristic of MPB is that regional styles develop in urban centers into a music of national character. Rio de Janeiro and São Paulo, in particular, assumed the role of catalysts since the 1960s and 1970s. However, with the increase in recording studios, record labels, radio and television stations since the 1980s, both cities lost influence. Salvador, for example, produced a particularly large number of creative musicians.

MPB is listened by people of all ages. This results in a greater historical awareness, and reinterpretations of old classics are common practices in MPB. Not only the performers, but also the composers and lyricists of the songs receive special appreciation. Singers like Chico Buarque and Caetano Veloso are also considered important poets in Brazil. The lyrics are not subordinate to the melodies, but rather superior to them.

Well-known MPB artists include, among many others, singers such as Gal Costa, Nara Leão, Zé Ramalho, Marina Lima, Simone, Elis Regina, Guilherme Arantes, Roberto Carlos, Jorge Ben Jor, Milton Nascimento, João Bosco, Belchior, Ivan Lins, Djavan.

=== Bossa nova ===
In the late 1950s, elements of bolero, foxtrot, and cha-cha-cha increasingly permeated samba, which gradually lost its typical characteristics during this period. This decline triggered a musical revolution: Bossa Nova. Unlike street samba, bossa nova emerged in the urban middle class, within the environment of bourgeois intellectuals. João Gilberto was particularly influential in shaping the style, both for his smooth singing and his guitar playing. His restrained singing reversed the bel canto style, the operetta style, that prevailed in samba in the 1950s.

The first bossa nova records by João Gilberto, in the last years of the 1950s, quickly became huge hits in Brazil. Antonio Carlos Jobim and other composers helped further develop this smoother, often slower, samba beat, which developed at the beach neighborhoods of Ipanema and, later, the Copacabana nightclubs. Bossa nova was introduced to the rest of the world by American jazz musicians in the early 1960s, and the song "The Girl from Ipanema" remains probably the best known Brazilian musical export, eventually becoming a jazz standard.

=== Brega music ===
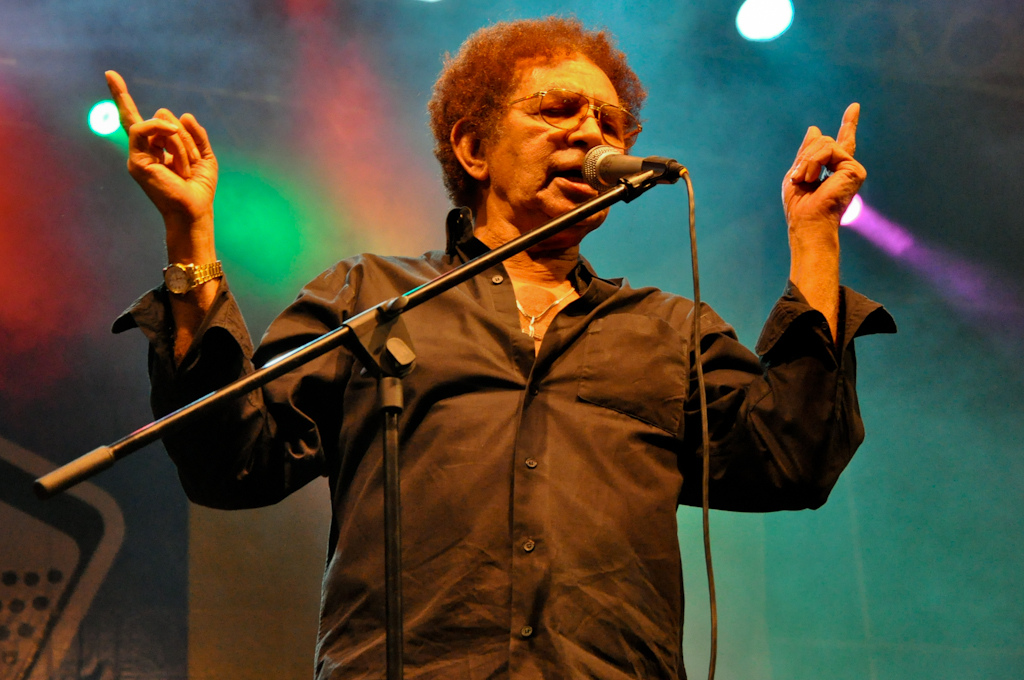
Reginaldo Rossi.

Brega is widely used to refer to popular romantic music with dramatic exaggeration or ingenuity, usually dealing with topics such as declarations of love, infidelity and love delusions. Historically, the greatest singers of the genre are from northeastern and northern Brazil; three of its biggest icons historically were Waldick Soriano, Reginaldo Rossi and Falcão, the latter following a part of a tradition of humorous brega. Paulo Sérgio stood out for his dramatic and romantic music. some precursors of the style in singers of the 1940s and 1950s, who followed, through bolero and samba-canção, a more "romantic" theme. Among them Orlando Dias, Carlos Alberto, Alcides Gerardi and Cauby Peixoto.

==== Technobrega ====
Technobrega is a Brazilian music genre that emerged in the early 2000s in the northern state of Pará, particularly in the city of Belém. The term combines "techno," referencing electronic music elements, and "brega", a Portuguese word often used to describe music considered kitschy or sentimental.

Rooted in regional rhythms such as brega, forró, and calypso, technobrega blends synthesizers, drum machines, and digital production with emotional lyrics and danceable beats. It gained popularity through informal distribution methods, including street vendors and large sound system parties known as aparelhagens. These events are crucial to the genre's culture, often involving light shows, live performances, and remix battles.

Unlike mainstream music industries, technobrega artists frequently operate independently, producing and distributing their own music. This model has challenged traditional notions of copyright and music commercialization in Brazil, making the genre a case study in alternative music economies. Despite facing prejudice and being labeled as lowbrow, technobrega has become a powerful expression of regional identity and creativity, influencing other genres and reaching audiences beyond the Amazon region.

Some of the most prominent names in the technobrega scene include:

Gaby Amarantos – Known as the “Beyoncé of Pará,” Gaby brought technobrega to national and international audiences with her fusion of brega, pop, and electronic styles.

Banda Uó – Though based in Goiás, this trio incorporated technobrega influences into their pop-electro sound and helped popularize the genre among younger audiences.

Pabllo Vittar – One of Brazil's most prominent LGBTQ+ pop artists, Pabllo Vittar has incorporated technobrega elements into several of her songs, blending regional rhythms with global pop and electronic music, helping introduce the genre to wider audiences.

=== Forró ===
Forró is a popular music and dance genre from Northeastern Brazil. The term refers to both the musical style and the social events where it is played, and it encompasses a variety of rhythmic forms that have evolved over time. With deep roots in rural traditions and everyday life, forró is an important symbol of Northeastern cultural identity.

Forró originated in the early 20th century, particularly in the semi-arid region known as the sertão. It is traditionally performed by a trio consisting of the accordion (sanfona), the zabumba (a type of bass drum), and the triângulo (triangle). The music typically features syncopated rhythms and lyrics that reflect themes of love, migration, hardship, and regional pride. Forró is a central element in regional celebrations such as the June Festivals. Beyond entertainment, it acts as a powerful form of cultural expression, transmitting local values and fostering community bonds. In 2021, forró was officially recognized as part of Brazil's Intangible Cultural Heritage by the Instituto do Patrimônio Histórico e Artístico Nacional (IPHAN).

Among the most iconic names in the history of forró is Luiz Gonzaga, who is widely regarded as the father of the genre and was instrumental in popularizing baião across Brazil. His influence shaped the sound of forró and brought the culture of the Northeast to national prominence. Another major figure is Dominguinhos, a protégé of Gonzaga, known for blending traditional forró with elements of MPB (Música Popular Brasileira) and jazz. Elba Ramalho gained fame for her energetic performances and for bringing forró to broader Brazilian pop audiences. Other influential artists include Marinês, often called the "Queen of Forró"; Trio Nordestino, pioneers of the classic forró trio format; Genival Lacerda, known for his humorous lyrics; and contemporary groups such as Falamansa, who helped revitalize the genre in the 2000s through the “forró universitário” movement, and Negâh Santos — Brazilian jazz percussionist with The Late Show Band.

=== Axé ===
Axé originated in Salvador, Bahia in the 1980s, fusing different Afro-Caribbean genres, such as marcha, reggae, and calypso. It also includes influences of Brazilian music such as frevo, forró and carixada. The word Axé comes from the Yoruba term àṣẹ, meaning "soul, light, spirit or good vibrations". Axé is also present in the Candomblé religion, as "the imagined spiritual power and energy bestowed upon practitioners by the pantheon of orixás". It also has ties with the Roman Catholic Church and the Lenten season, which represents the roots of Bahian Carnival.

=== Brazilian gospel ===
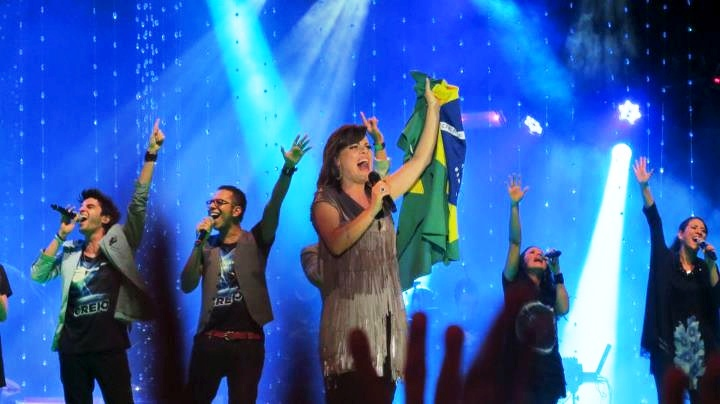
Diante do Trono, the main worship ministry in Latin America.

Gospel music emerged in Brazil before the 1960s with hymnals that were brought and translated into Portuguese by American missionaries. From the late 1960s the first singers of Christian music groups emerged in Brazil, but the songs were not highly valued. Gospel music became popular in Brazil in the late 1990s, with the emergence of congregational singing and bands such as Diante do Trono, led by Ana Paula Valadão. Diante do Trono has become the largest contemporary worship music ministry in Latin America.

In Brazil, the term "contemporary Christian music" is erroneously considered synonymous with gospel music, produced by Protestant Christians. Other Christian religions, such as Catholicism, for example, commonly refrain from using this specific term for their productions, even though it is included within their scope, preferring only the term Christian Music, due to the appropriation by Protestants for the rebranding of Protestant gospel music.

Protestant religions, which are gaining increasing influence, have a tense relationship with the music of Afro-Brazilian religions, while the Catholic Church is largely tolerant of it.

=== Brazilian rock ===
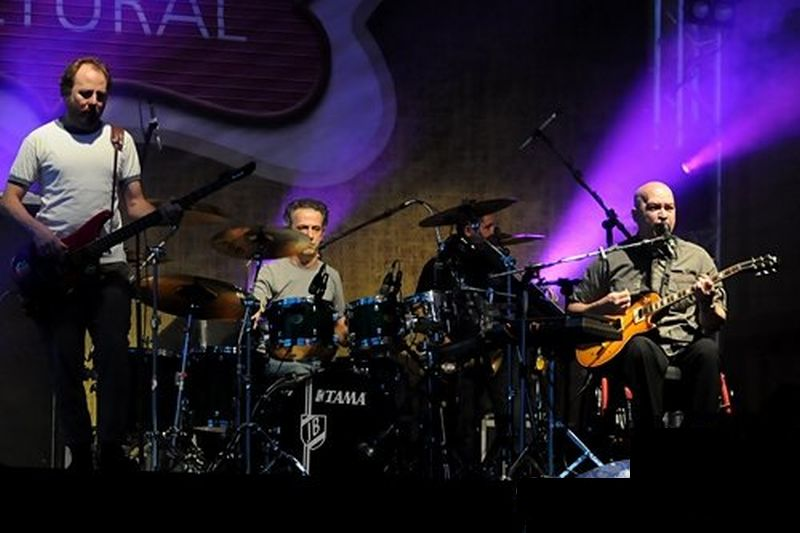
Paralamas do Sucesso.

The musical style known in Brazil as "Brazilian rock n' roll" dates back to Nora Ney's "Ronda Das Horas", a Portuguese version of "Rock Around the Clock" in 1954. In the 1960s, young singers like Roberto Carlos and the Jovem Guarda movement were very popular. The 1960s also saw the rise of bands such as the "tropicalistas" Os Mutantes and the experimental (mixing progressive rock, jazz and Música popular brasileira) Som Imaginário.

The 1970s saw the emergence of many progressive rock and/or hard rock bands such as O Terço, A Bolha, A Barca do Sol, Som Nosso de Cada Dia, Vímana and Bacamarte, some of which attained some recognition internationally; Rita Lee, in her solo career after Os Mutantes, championed the glam-rock aesthetics in Brazil; Casa das Máquinas and Patrulha do Espaço were more bona-fide hard rock bands, and the likes of (Raul Seixas, Secos e Molhados, Novos Baianos and A Cor do Som) mixed the genre with traditional Brazilian music. In the late 1970s, the Brazilian punk rock scene kicked off mainly in São Paulo and in Brasília, booming in the 1980s, with Inocentes, Cólera, Ratos de Porão, Garotos Podres, etc.

The real commercial boom of Brazilian rock was in the 1980s, with many bands and artists like Blitz, Camisa de Vênus, Barão Vermelho, Legião Urbana, Lobão, Engenheiros do Hawaii, Titãs, Kid Abelha, Paralamas do Sucesso, and many others, and festivals like Rock in Rio and Hollywood Rock.. The late 1980s and early 1990s also witnessed the beginnings of an electronica-inspired scene, with a lot more limited commercial potential but achieving some critical acclaim: Suba, Loop B, Harry, etc.

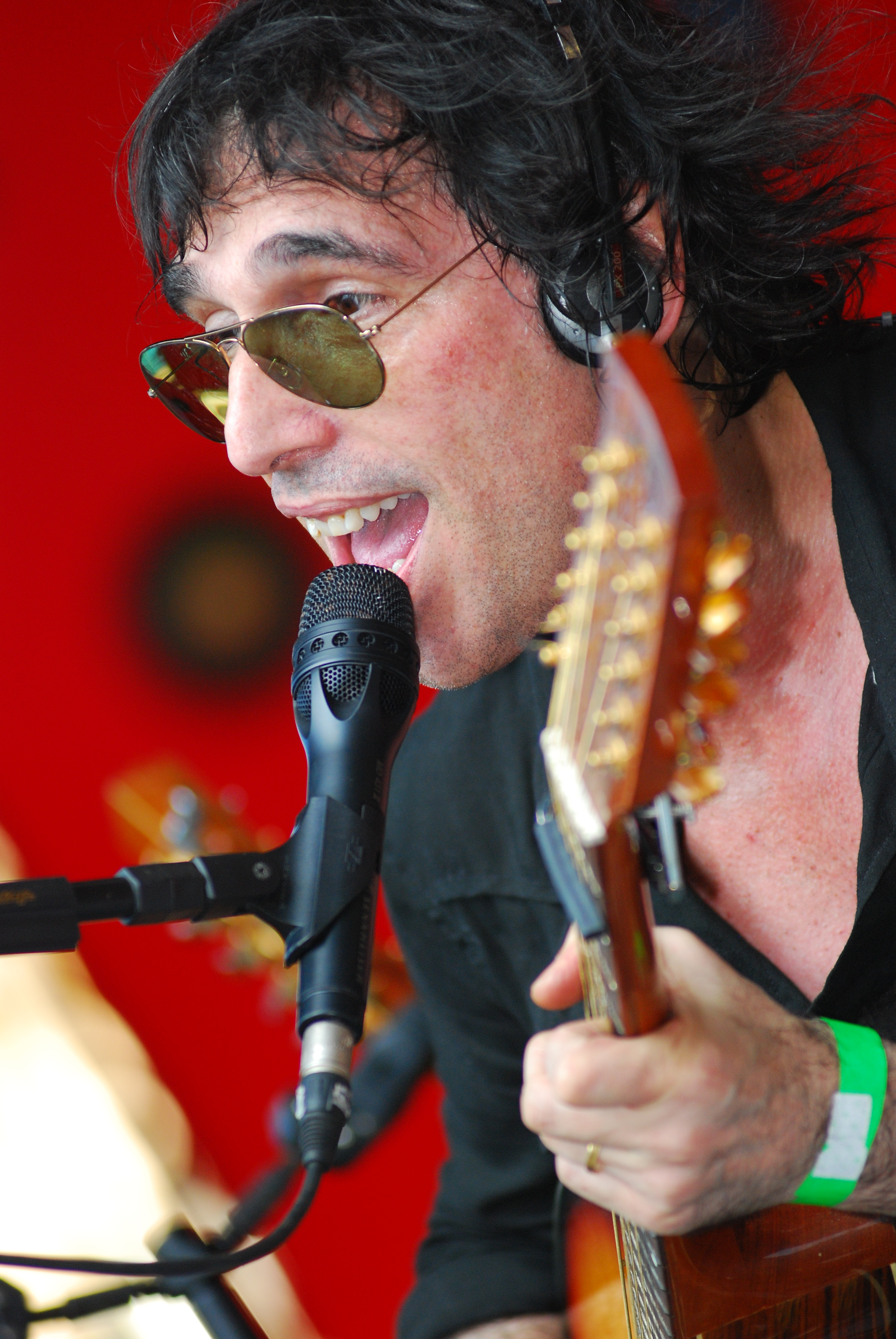
Lobão.

In the 1990s, the meteoric rise of Mamonas Assassinas, which sold more than 3 million copies of its only CD (a record, by Brazilian standards) came to a tragic end when the band's plane crashed, killing all five members of the band, the pilot and the co-pilot. Other commercially successful bands included Jota Quest, Charlie Brown Jr., Raimundos and Skank, while Chico Science & Nação Zumbi and the whole Mangue Bit movement received much critical attention and accolades, but very little commercial success – success that declined after the death of one of its founders, Chico Science. It was also in the 1990s that the first seeds of what would grow into being the Brazilian indie scene were planted, with the creation of indie festivals such as Abril Pro Rock and, later in the decade, Porão do Rock. The band Pato Fu was considered by Time magazine one of the ten best bands in the world outside the United States. It is also known to re-record hits Brazilian and international versions of toy instruments.

Female singer Pitty is also very popular. The indie scene has been growing exponentially since the early 2000s, with more and more festivals taking place all around the country. However, due to several factors including but not limited to the worldwide collapse of the music industry, all the agitation in the indie scene has so far failed in translating into international success, but in Brazil they developed a real, substantial cultural movement. That scene is still much of a ghetto, with bands capturing the attention of international critics, but many playing again in Brazil when they become popular in the exterior, due to the lack of financial and material support which would allow for careers to be developed. One notable exception is CSS, an alternative electro rock outfit that has launched a successful international career, performing in festivals and venues in North America, Europe, Asia and Australia. Other unique example of success through independent music scene that made to the mainstream is the band Móveis Coloniais de Acaju. The band has its own style, somewhere between rock and folk, and is recognized as the most important independent band in Brazil. The record company Trama tries to support some bands with structure and exposure, and can be credited with early support to CSS and later to Móveis Coloniais de Acaju.

==== Brazilian alternative rock and indie rock ====
Alternative rock in Brazil, including its subgenre indie rock, represents a diverse and dynamic branch of Brazilian popular music that emerged prominently in the late 1980s and flourished during the 1990s and 2000s. Influenced by international acts like The Smiths, Radiohead, Nirvana, and Sonic Youth, as well as local post-punk and new wave pioneers, Brazilian alternative rock blends introspective lyrics, experimental sonorities, and regional identities with a do-it-yourself (DIY) ethos.

In the 1990s, bands such as Pato Fu (from Belo Horizonte), Skank (initially blending rock and reggae), and Los Hermanos (from Rio de Janeiro) helped redefine the sound of Brazilian rock. Their success paved the way for a new generation of bands exploring more poetic, ironic, and sometimes melancholic themes—often far from the traditional aesthetics of mainstream Brazilian rock.

The 2000s and 2010s saw the rise of a robust independent music scene, often supported by digital distribution and small festivals across Brazil. Bands such as Mombojó (Recife), Superguidis (Porto Alegre), Ludov (São Paulo), and Cachorro Grande (Porto Alegre) stood out by blending indie rock with regional music influences, psychedelic elements, or a revival of garage and mod rock.

More recently, bands like O Terno, Boogarins, and solo acts such as Céu and Tim Bernardes have received international attention while maintaining a strong presence in Brazil's alternative music circuits. Their sound often combines MPB (Música Popular Brasileira), Tropicália, and rock with experimental or lo-fi aesthetics, making Brazilian indie rock one of the most eclectic and innovative branches of contemporary Latin American music.

==== Brazilian heavy metal ====
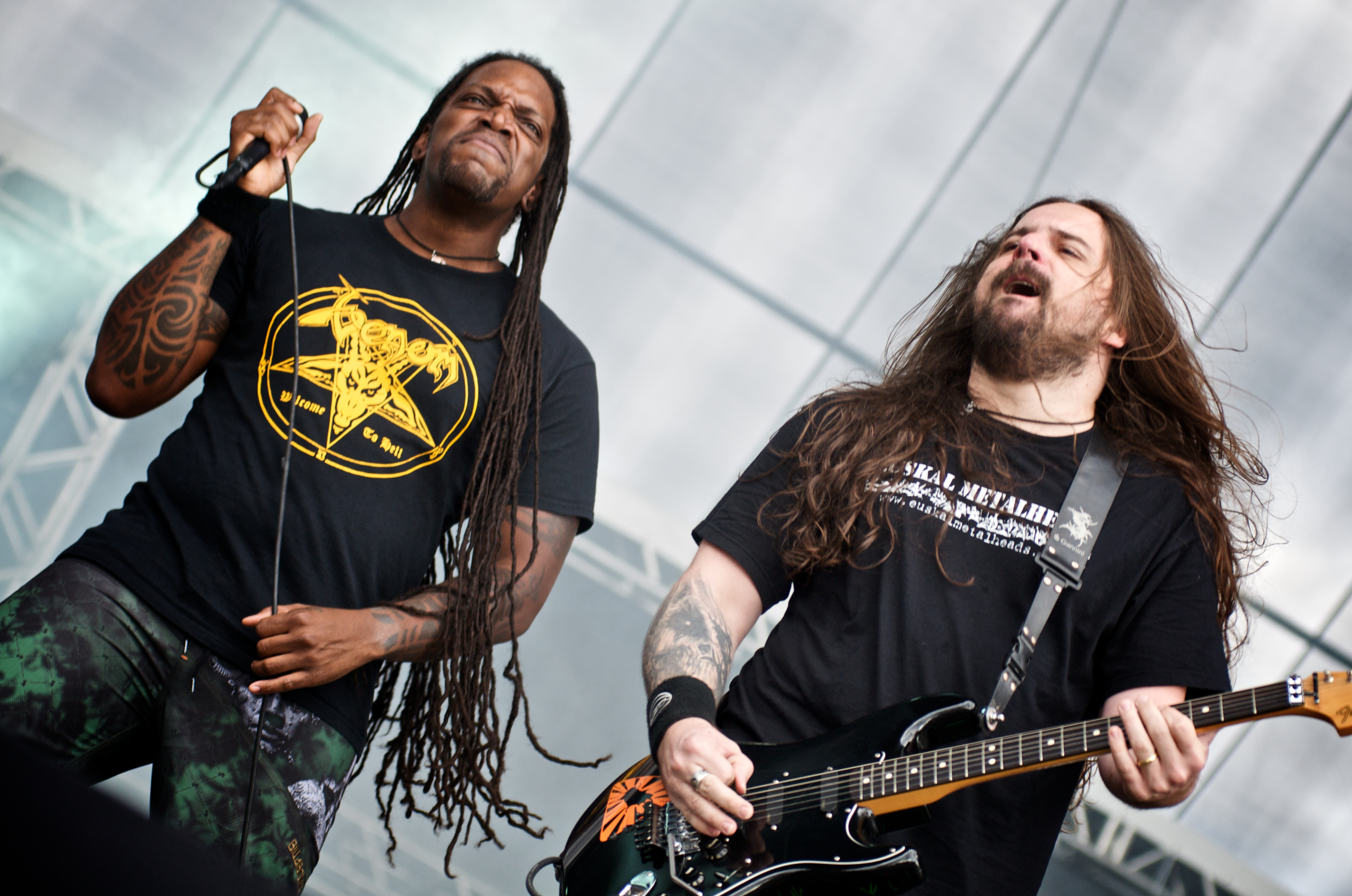
Sepultura: Brazilian Heavy Metal Band

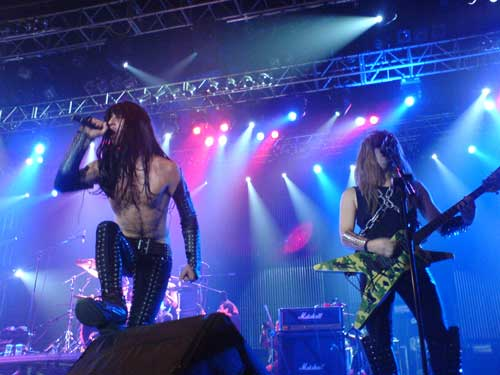
Massacration.

Brazilian metal originated in the mid-1980s with three prominent scenes: Belo Horizonte, São Paulo and Rio de Janeiro. The most famous Brazilian metal bands are Sepultura, Angra, Krisiun and the singer Andre Matos. Sepultura is considered an influential thrash metal band, influencing the development of death metal.

Famous bands of the 1980s include Korzus, Sarcófago, Overdose, Dorsal Atlântica, Viper, MX, PUS, Mutilator, Chakal, Vulcano, and Attomica.

There's also Massacration, a Brazilian satirical heavy metal band, self-proclaimed the "greatest band in the world".

===== Brazilian black metal =====
Brazilian black metal scene has developed a distinctive identity since its emergence in the late 1980s and early 1990s, marked by its raw production, intense atmosphere, and often controversial ideological themes. While influenced by the early Scandinavian wave of black metal, the Brazilian scene quickly evolved its own aesthetics and sonic aggression, shaped by local socio-political contexts and underground metal traditions. One of the earliest and most influential acts was Sarcófago, a band that, although initially rooted in death and thrash metal, helped lay the groundwork for black metal in Brazil. Their 1987 album I.N.R.I. is considered a seminal release in the global black metal canon, noted for its primitive sound, anti-Christian themes, and visual elements that predated much of the second wave of black metal in Europe.

Although not always classified strictly as black metal by contemporary genre standards, several extreme metal bands from the 1980s laid important foundations for the development of the Brazilian black metal scene. Groups like Vulcano, Holocausto, and Mutilator emerged with a raw, aggressive sound and anti-establishment themes that resonated with the aesthetic and ideology later embraced by black metal. Vulcano, formed in São Paulo in 1981, released Bloody Vengeance (1986), a record now recognized as a pioneering work in South American extreme metal. Holocausto, part of the so-called "Belo Horizonte scene" alongside Sarcófago and Sepultura, shocked the underground with their 1987 debut Campo de Extermínio, an album noted for its chaotic sonic violence and war-themed imagery. Mutilator, another key act from Belo Horizonte, also contributed to the early blackened death/thrash hybrid sound with Immortal Force (1987). These bands are now seen as proto-black metal influences that helped shape the Brazilian and global underground.

Throughout the 1990s and 2000s, bands such as Mystifier, Impurity, Murder Rape, Unearthly, Luxúria de Lilith, Ocultan and Miasthenia carried the torch, each contributing to the evolution of a uniquely Brazilian black metal style. These bands often blended traditional black metal with death metal elements, occult or theistic Satanism, and regional folklore, producing a sound that was both abrasive and culturally distinctive.

The Brazilian black metal underground is also known for its commitment to DIY ethics, with a strong network of independent labels, zines, and cassette trading that supported the scene's growth. Despite limited mainstream exposure and occasional controversies related to ideological extremism, the community has remained active and fiercely independent. Modern Brazilian black metal continues to diversify, incorporating ambient, symphonic, and ritualistic elements while retaining the uncompromising spirit of its early pioneers. The scene remains vibrant, with both established and emerging bands receiving recognition in international black metal circles, solidifying Brazil's place in the global landscape of extreme music.

===== Brazilian death metal =====
Brazilian death metal scene has been an influential and enduring component of the global extreme metal movement since the late 1980s. Emerging from a fertile underground metal culture, Brazilian death metal distinguished itself through its raw intensity, aggressive sound, and often politically charged or socially conscious lyrics. Rooted in the broader thrash and black metal explosion of the 1980s, bands like Sepultura—while more thrash-oriented in their early days—helped pave the way for the heavier, darker death metal genre to flourish in Brazil.

By the early 1990s, bands such as Krisiun, Torture Squad, Claustrofobia, Rebaelliun, Obskure, Mental Horror, and NervoChaos began gaining recognition both nationally and internationally. Krisiun, in particular, became one of Brazil's most prominent death metal acts, known for their relentless speed, technical proficiency, and brutal sound. These bands often recorded under limited resources, but their commitment and intensity drew attention from major underground labels in Europe and North America.

Brazilian death metal is characterized by fast, blast-beat-driven drumming, low-tuned guitars, guttural vocals, and lyrical themes that range from anti-religious critiques to reflections on war, death, and societal decay. Despite facing challenges such as limited infrastructure and support for extreme music, the scene has remained active and innovative. Independent festivals, zines, and small labels have played a crucial role in sustaining the community. Over the decades, the Brazilian death metal scene has continued to evolve, incorporating elements from other subgenres and embracing new technologies without losing its core identity. Today, it remains a respected and influential force within the global death metal community, with both veteran and emerging bands maintaining the country's legacy of sonic extremity. In recent years, there has been a noticeable increase in the number of Brazilian death metal bands with women in their lineups. Notable examples include Nervosa, which gained significant recognition after their performance at Rock in Rio in 2019, and Crypta, a band formed by former members of Nervosa that has also garnered international acclaim. Both bands have helped to expand the visibility of women in extreme metal. Nervosa was invited to perform at the Wacken Open Air festival in 2020, but the event was cancelled due to the COVID-19 pandemic. The Brazilian death metal scene is active across all regions of the country, with a particularly strong presence in the Northeast. This region is home to notable bands such as Headhunter D.C., Escarnium, Decomposed God, Infested Blood, Torment the Skies, Pandemmy, Burning Torment, Infectos and Krenak. Among them, Cangaço stands out for blending traditional death metal with elements of Baião, a regional rhythm native to Northeast Brazil. In 2010, Cangaço won the W.O.A. Metal Battle Brazil and represented the country in the international finals at the Wacken Open Air festival.

===== Brazilian thrash metal =====
Thrash metal scene in Brazil emerged in the early 1980s, influenced by the rise of the genre in the United States and Europe. Characterized by fast riffs, aggressive vocals, and social or political themes, thrash metal found fertile ground in Brazil, particularly in urban centers such as São Paulo, Belo Horizonte, and Rio de Janeiro.

One of the most influential and pioneering thrash metal bands in Brazil is Sepultura, founded in 1984 in Belo Horizonte. Initially with a sound closer to death and black metal, the band quickly adopted thrash elements, becoming an international reference and paving the way for other Brazilian bands on the global stage. The album Beneath the Remains (1989), released by Roadrunner Records, is considered a landmark of the genre. Other important bands in the scene include Korzus, Ratos de Porão (which blends hardcore punk and crossover thrash), Dorsal Atlântica, Mutilator, Sarcófago (mostly associated with black metal, but with strong thrash influences in certain phases), and Vulcano. Southeast region was the main epicenter of the movement, although bands from other regions also contributed to the diversity and richness of Brazilian thrash metal.

During the 1990s, with the rise of grunge and other alternative styles, the thrash metal scene experienced a decline in visibility but maintained a loyal fan base. In the 21st century, there was a revival of interest in the genre, with the emergence of new bands, the strengthening of independent festivals, and the reissue of classic albums alongside anniversary tours by veteran acts. Notable newer bands include Nervosa, an all-female thrash/death metal band from São Paulo formed in 2010, known for their socially conscious lyrics and international tours; Black Pantera, a crossover thrash trio from Uberaba formed in 2014, addressing themes of racism and social injustice; Crypta, a death/thrash metal band formed in 2019 by former members of Nervosa, including bassist and vocalist Fernanda Lira and drummer Luana Dametto; Eskröta, a São Paulo-based female trio founded in 2017 that mixes thrash with crust punk and grindcore, often delivering humorous and politically charged lyrics; and Surra, a band from Santos formed in 2012 that combines hardcore punk and thrash metal with sharp critiques of Brazilian politics and society.

==== Brazilian punk rock and hardcore punk ====
Punk rock and hardcore punk scene in Brazil began to take shape in the late 1970s and early 1980s, especially in major urban centers such as São Paulo, Brasília, Porto Alegre, and Curitiba. Influenced by the British and American punk movements, Brazilian punk quickly developed unique characteristics marked by political lyrics, social critique, anti-establishment attitudes, and a strong presence in the underground cultural sphere.

In São Paulo, the neighborhood of Vila Carolina became one of the most prominent hubs for Brazilian punk, giving rise to pioneering bands such as Garotos Podres, Restos de Nada, Cólera, Inocentes and Ratos de Porão. These groups were instrumental in shaping both the sonic aesthetics and the ideological stance of Brazilian punk. Despite the repression of Brazil's military dictatorship (1964–1985), the movement flourished through zines, independent record labels, anarchist collectives, and self-managed venues.

During the 1980s, punk and hardcore expanded to other parts of the country. In the Federal District, the punk scene intersected with the post-punk movement, with bands like Aborto Elétrico and later Plebe Rude incorporating political themes and addressing urban alienation. In Porto Alegre, bands such as Os Replicantes gained notoriety for blending punk attitude with humor and regional elements.

The 1990s saw a resurgence and diversification of Brazilian hardcore, with the emergence of straight edge movements and a growing influence of metal, melodic hardcore, and skate punk. Bands such as Dead Fish, Garage Fuzz, Noção de Nada, and Point of No Return represented a more technically skilled and socially engaged generation, often addressing themes such as veganism, anti-capitalism, and environmentalism.

Despite transformations in the music industry and the digitalization of cultural consumption, punk and hardcore remain active forces in Brazilian music. The scene is still characterized by its independence, DIY ethos, and its commitment to resisting social oppression. Festivals, cultural collectives, and new bands continue to emerge across the country, preserving the legacy of punk and hardcore as powerful forms of political, cultural, and artistic expression.

===== Brazilian emo, screamo, and post-hardcore =====
Emo, screamo, and post-hardcore in Brazil refer to interconnected subgenres of rock music that became especially prominent in the 2000s, emerging from underground scenes and reaching significant commercial and cultural impact. Drawing influence from both the first and second waves of American emo (such as Sunny Day Real Estate, Thursday, and My Chemical Romance), Brazilian artists added local lyrical sensibilities, Portuguese-language expression, and themes of heartbreak, existential angst, and social identity.

The term "emo" gained mainstream popularity in Brazil through bands like Fresno, NX Zero, and Glória, which helped shape a nationally recognizable emo and post-hardcore aesthetic. These bands became known for their emotionally charged lyrics, dramatic melodies, and strong fanbases among teenagers, particularly in the 2000s. The mainstream rise of emo also intersected with fashion, internet culture, and youth identity formation.

Fresno, formed in Porto Alegre in 1999, is one of the genre's most enduring acts, evolving from a classic emo sound into alternative rock and synthpop elements in the 2010s. NX Zero, originating from São Paulo, achieved massive radio success while maintaining post-hardcore influences in albums like Agora (2008) and Projeto Paralelo (2010), which featured collaborations with rap and reggae artists.

In the underground scene, bands like Colligere (Curitiba), Reffer (Recife), Zander (Rio de Janeiro), and Dead Fish (Vitória) played pivotal roles in shaping Brazilian post-hardcore and melodic hardcore. These bands were deeply connected with DIY ethics, independent labels like Läjä Records and Highlight Sounds, and often addressed social and political issues through aggressive yet emotional music.

The Brazilian screamo scene also flourished in niche circuits, influenced by bands like Orchid and Saetia. Acts such as Rhayra, Aurora Rulez! and Adorno explored cathartic vocals, chaotic structures, and poetic lyrics, often tied to anarchist or queer-feminist collectives.

===== Brazilian grindcore and crust punk =====
Grindcore and crust punk scenes in Brazil have played a significant role in the global development of extreme music. Emerging in the late 1980s and early 1990s, these genres found fertile ground in Brazil's underground music community, especially in the urban centers of São Paulo, Belo Horizonte, and Porto Alegre.

Grindcore in Brazil is known for its raw intensity, politically charged lyrics, and fusion with death metal and hardcore punk. Early Brazilian grindcore acts such as ROT and Subcut rapidly gained recognition in international circuits for their aggressive sound and DIY ethos. Other foundational acts include Lobotomia, Hutt, and I Shot Cyrus, which contributed significantly to the aggressive blend of hardcore, metal, and punk.

In the 2000s and 2010s, bands such as Desalmado, Test, Surra, and Facada gained prominence by combining extreme sonic violence with political messages focused on social inequality, police brutality, and systemic oppression.

Crust punk also found a dedicated following in Brazil, with bands like Armagedom and D.E.R. (Desastre em Rede) blending anarchist ideals with a heavy, metallic punk sound. Other notable acts include Manger Cadavre?, Subterror, Nuclear Frost, and Social Chaos, known for their fast tempos, d-beat rhythms, and harsh political critiques.

Both grindcore and crust punk in Brazil are marked by their commitment to underground ethics, including independent production, community solidarity, and resistance to mainstream commercialization. Despite limited resources and media exposure, the scenes have maintained vibrant networks, often collaborating with international acts and participating in global punk festivals.

==== Brazilian rap rock ====
Rap rock in Brazil, also known as rap'n'roll, refers to a hybrid music genre that combines elements of hip hop and rock, and has had a notable presence in Brazilian popular music since the early 1990s. Influenced by American acts such as Rage Against the Machine, Beastie Boys, and Limp Bizkit, the Brazilian version of rap rock developed its own identity, often incorporating funk, reggae, samba, and socially conscious lyrics that reflect urban life, inequality, and resistance.

One of the most prominent pioneers of the genre is Planet Hemp, formed in 1993 in Rio de Janeiro. Their fusion of hip hop, hardcore punk, and marijuana advocacy created a countercultural movement that resonated strongly with urban youth. The band also launched the solo career of rapper Marcelo D2, who continued blending samba with rap and rock influences.

O Rappa, another major band in the genre, blended rap vocals with dub, rock, and reggae, tackling themes of social injustice, poverty, and police violence in songs like "Pescador de Ilusões" and "Minha Alma (A Paz Que Eu Não Quero)". Their powerful lyrics and soundscapes earned them both critical and commercial success.

In the early 2000s, bands such as Charlie Brown Jr. and Detonautas Roque Clube brought rap rock to mainstream Brazilian audiences. Charlie Brown Jr., from Santos (São Paulo), is particularly iconic for its fusion of skate punk, rap, reggae, and hardcore, as well as its reflections on youth, love, and rebellion.

Other important contributors include Pavilhão 9, known for mixing rap with heavy guitars and addressing themes of violence and exclusion in São Paulo's periphery, and Strike, who combined pop punk with rap influences. Rap rock continues to influence new artists in Brazil's urban and independent scenes, especially as boundaries between musical genres become increasingly fluid in the digital age.

==== Manguebeat ====
Manguebeat (also misspelled mangue bit) is a Brazilian cultural and musical movement that originated in Recife, Pernambuco, in the early 1990s. It combines traditional regional rhythms such as maracatu, coco, and ciranda with elements of rock, punk, funk, hip hop, and electronic music. The movement was spearheaded by bands such as Chico Science & Nação Zumbi and Mundo Livre S/A, and quickly gained national and international recognition.

Manguebeat arose as a reaction to the socio-economic stagnation and cultural isolation of Recife at the time. Its creators proposed a "mangue" (mangrove) metaphor, representing the rich and organic potential of local culture, connected via "antennas" to the global world. This vision was outlined in the 1992 manifesto Caranguejos com Cérebro ("Crabs with Brains"), which called for cultural innovation rooted in local identity and open to global influences.

The movement's sound was characterized by heavy percussion, Afro-Brazilian rhythms, electric guitars, and socially conscious lyrics addressing issues such as inequality, urban decay, and cultural resistance. Manguebeat played a crucial role in revitalizing Recife's music scene and brought renewed attention to Northeast Brazil as a hub of creativity and political expression in music.

Although the sudden death of Chico Science in 1997 was a major blow to the movement, its legacy continues through bands like Nação Zumbi and a broad influence on contemporary Brazilian music. Manguebeat remains a symbol of cultural fusion, innovation, and resistance, and is considered one of the most important musical movements in Brazil since Tropicália.

==== Samba rock ====
Samba rock, also known as sambalanço, is a Brazilian music genre and dance style that emerged in São Paulo during the 1960s. It is a fusion of samba, a traditional Afro-Brazilian rhythm, with elements of American rock and roll, soul, and funk. Characterized by its upbeat tempo and syncopated rhythms, samba rock reflects the cultural blending that occurred in Brazil's urban centers during the mid-20th century.

The genre was heavily influenced by the popularity of African-American music among Afro-Brazilian youth. Artists such as Jorge Ben Jor, Tim Maia, and Bebeto played a crucial role in popularizing samba rock by combining samba grooves with electric guitar riffs, brass sections, and the smooth, danceable aesthetics of soul and funk music.

As a dance, samba rock is typically performed in pairs and is known for its dynamic, improvisational style. It incorporates intricate footwork, spins, and fluid movements, drawing inspiration from both traditional samba partner dances and American swing dancing. The dance has remained popular in São Paulo's Black communities and continues to be celebrated in dance halls, festivals, and cultural gatherings.

In recent decades, samba rock has experienced a resurgence, especially through dance competitions and social media platforms that highlight its heritage and contemporary appeal. It is considered a symbol of Afro-Brazilian identity and creativity, representing the spirit of cultural resistance and innovation.

=== Sertanejo ===
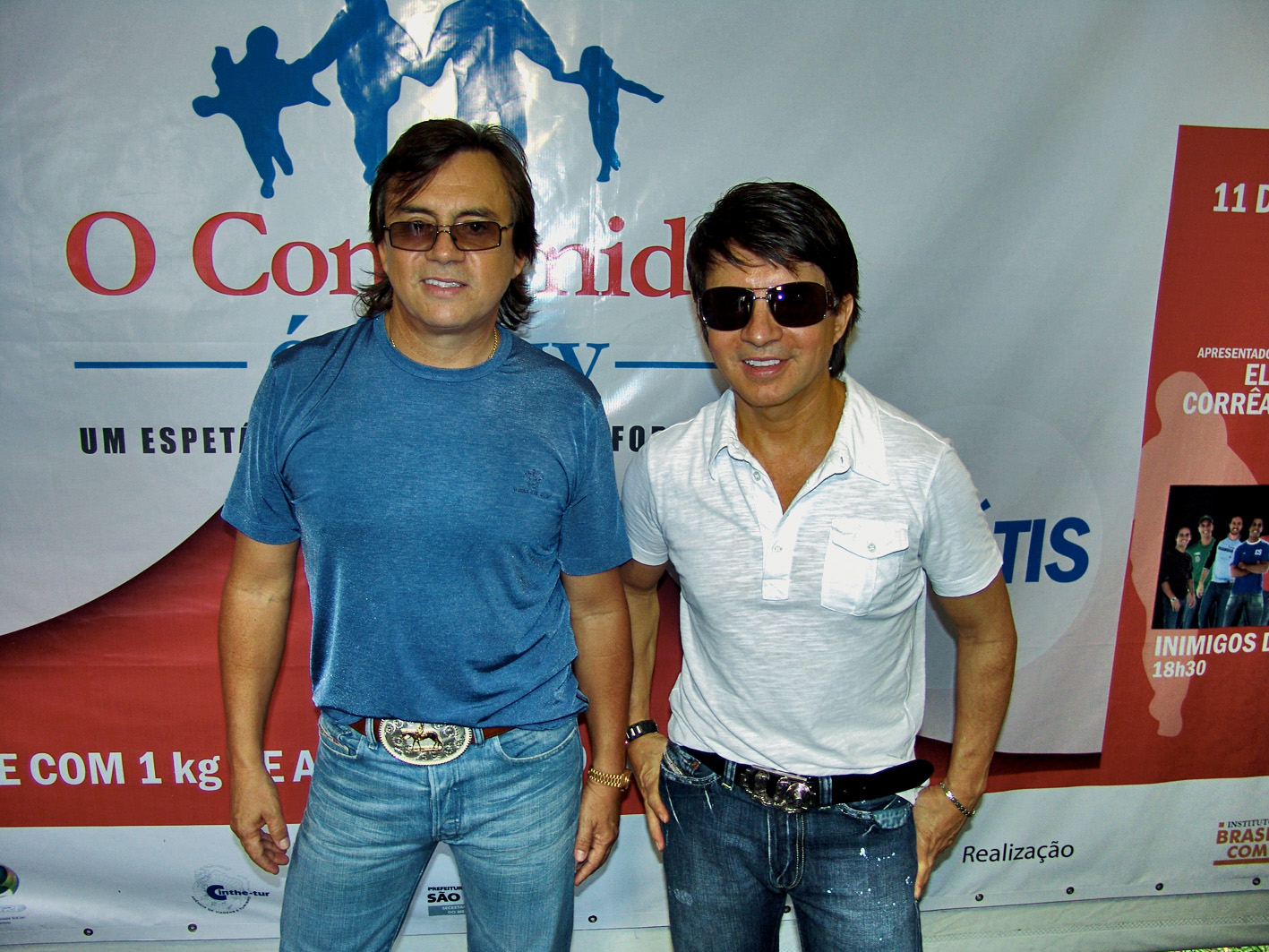
Chitãozinho & Xororó.

Música sertaneja or simply sertanejo is a term for Brazilian country music. It originally referred to music originating among Sertão and música caipira. (Caipira music first emergerd in the state of São Paulo, as well as in some the regions of Mato Grosso do Sul, Goiás, Minas Gerais, Paraná and Mato Grosso. Musical rhythm is very spread out in the Southeastern and southern regions of Brazil.)

The genre is extremely famous in the country, having as some of its greatest exponents Chitãozinho & Xororó, Leandro e Leonardo, Zeze Di Camargo e Luciano, Chrystian & Ralf, João Paulo & Daniel and Sérgio Reis. Additionally, over the past few years, artists such as Jorge & Mateus and Marília Mendonça have been on the rise.

A subgenre called "sertanejo universitário" (university sertanejo) developed from the mid-2000s, consisting of a more stripped-down and acoustic use of guitars, influenced by Western pop music. It became very popular among young Brazilians throughout the country and dominated the sertanejo scene in the 2010s.

Sertanejo is usually divided into five phases: Música Caipira (Caipira music), Sertanejo Original (original sertanejo), Sertanejo Romântico (romance sertanejo), Sertanejo Universitário (college sertanejo), and Agronejo (agribusiness sertanejo). The latter emerged around 2020, rooted in the exaltation of the countryside, agriculture, and agribusiness, reflecting the experiences and values of agrarian communities experiencing economic and social growth.

=== Northeastern Music ===
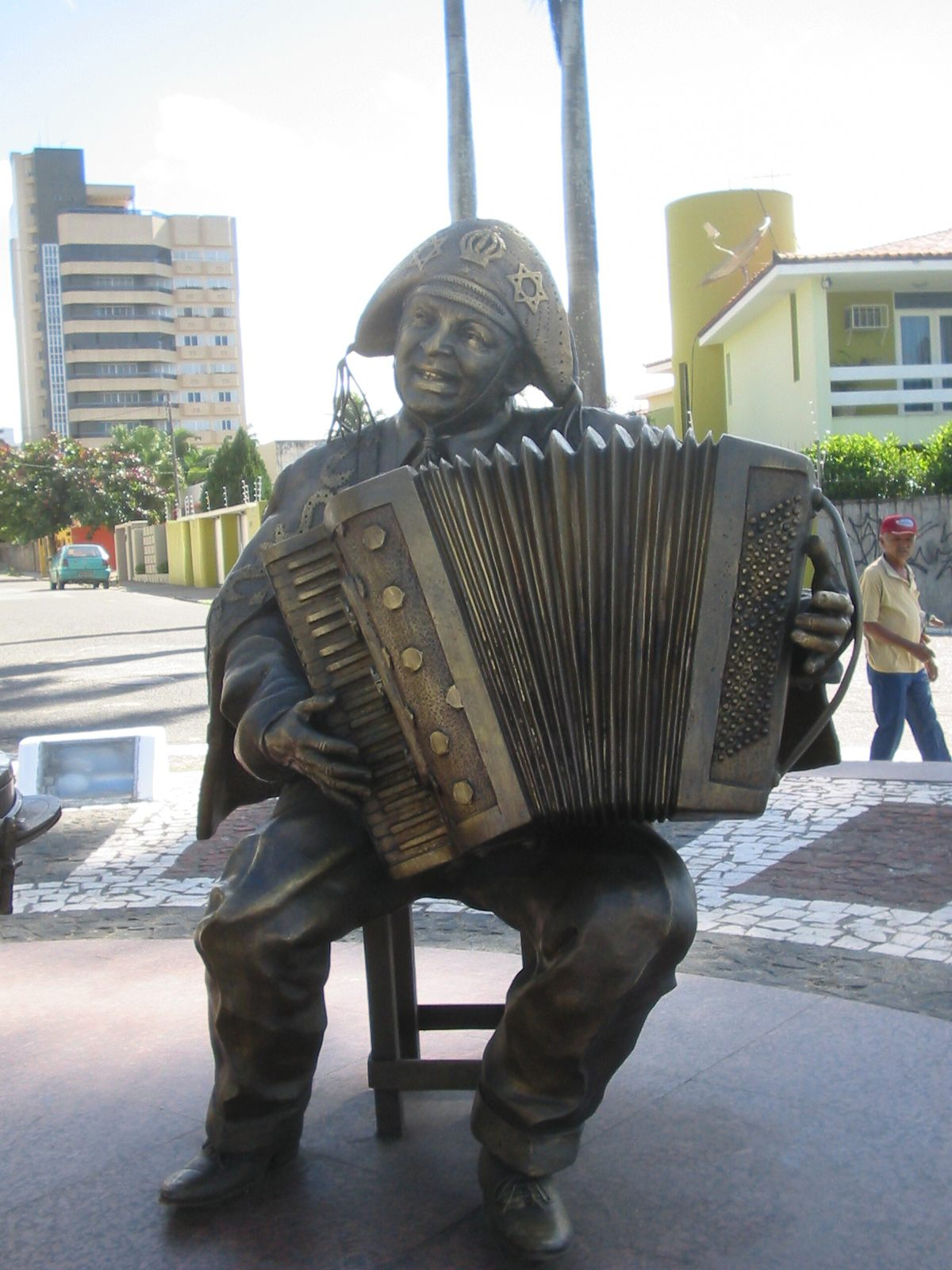
Statue of Luiz Gonzaga.

Northeastern music is a generic term for any popular music from the large region of Northeastern Brazil, including both coastal and inland areas. Rhythms are slower and are derived from guitars instead of percussion instruments like in the rest of Brazil—in this region, African rhythms and Portuguese melodies combined to form maracatu and forró. Most influentially, the area around the states of Pernambuco and its neighboring states.

=== Gaucho music (Southern music) ===
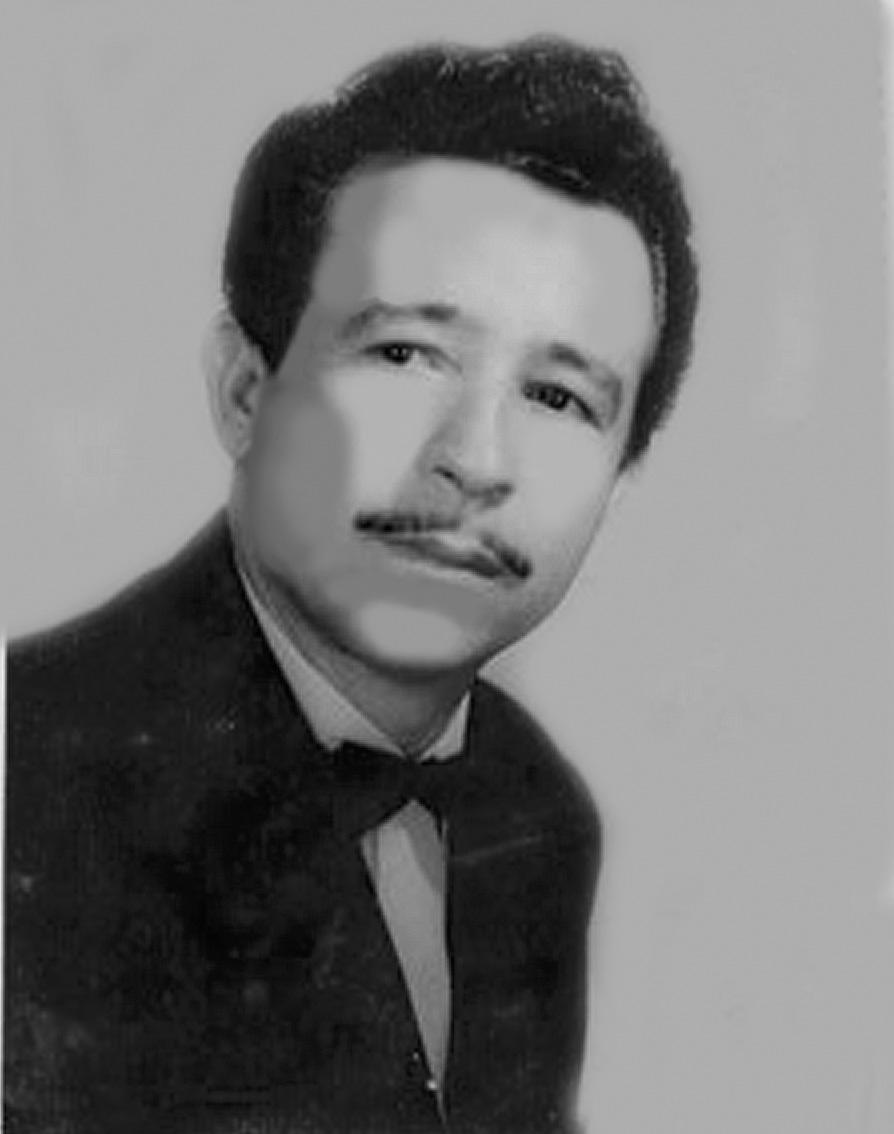
Teixeirinha.

Southern music, or Brazilian gaucho music (Portuguese: Música gaúcha) is a general term used for the music originally from the Rio Grande do Sul state, in Southern Brazil. Some of the most famous musicians of this genre are Teixeirinha, Gaúcho da Fronteira, Renato Borghetti, Yamandu Costa, Jayme Caetano Braun and Luiz Marenco, among others.

=== Music of Salvador: Late 60s to mid-70s ===
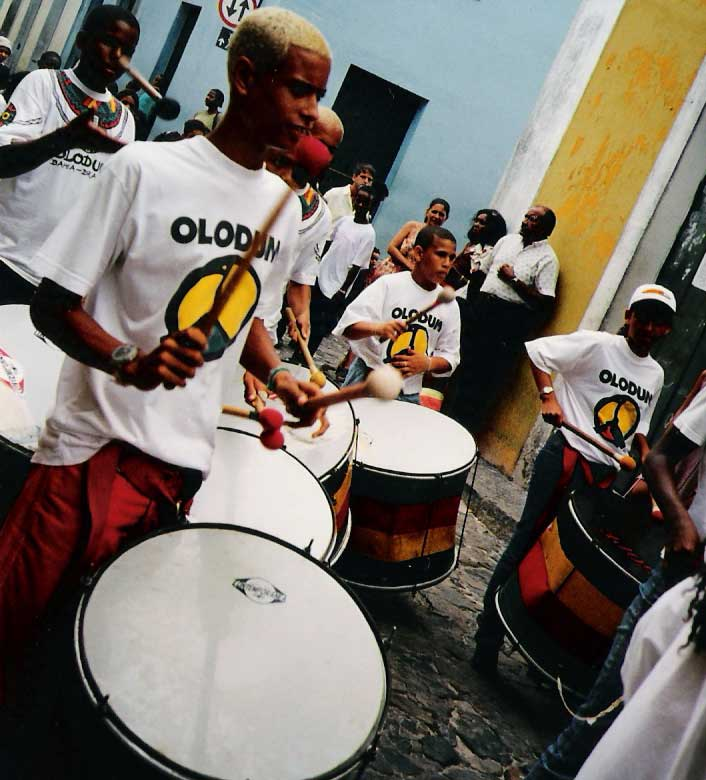
Members of Olodum performing.

In the latter part of the 1960s, a group of black Bahians began dressing as Native Americans during the Salvadoran Carnaval, identifying with their shared struggles through history. These groups included Comanches do Pelô and Apaches de Tororó and were known for a forceful and powerful style of percussion, and frequent violent encounters with the police. Starting in 1974, a group of black Bahians called Ilê Aiyê became prominent, identifying with the Yoruba people of West Africa. Along with a policy of loosening restrictions by the Brazilian government, Ilê Aiyê's sound and message spread to groups like Grupo Cultural do Olodum, who established community centers and other philanthropic efforts.

=== Frevo ===
Frevo is a style of music from Olinda and Recife. Frevo bands always play during the Carnival.

=== Sambass ===
Sambass is a fusion of samba and Drum & Bass. The most famous sambass musicians are DJ Marky and DJ Patife whose hit Sambassim might be the most known sambass track.

=== Funk carioca ===
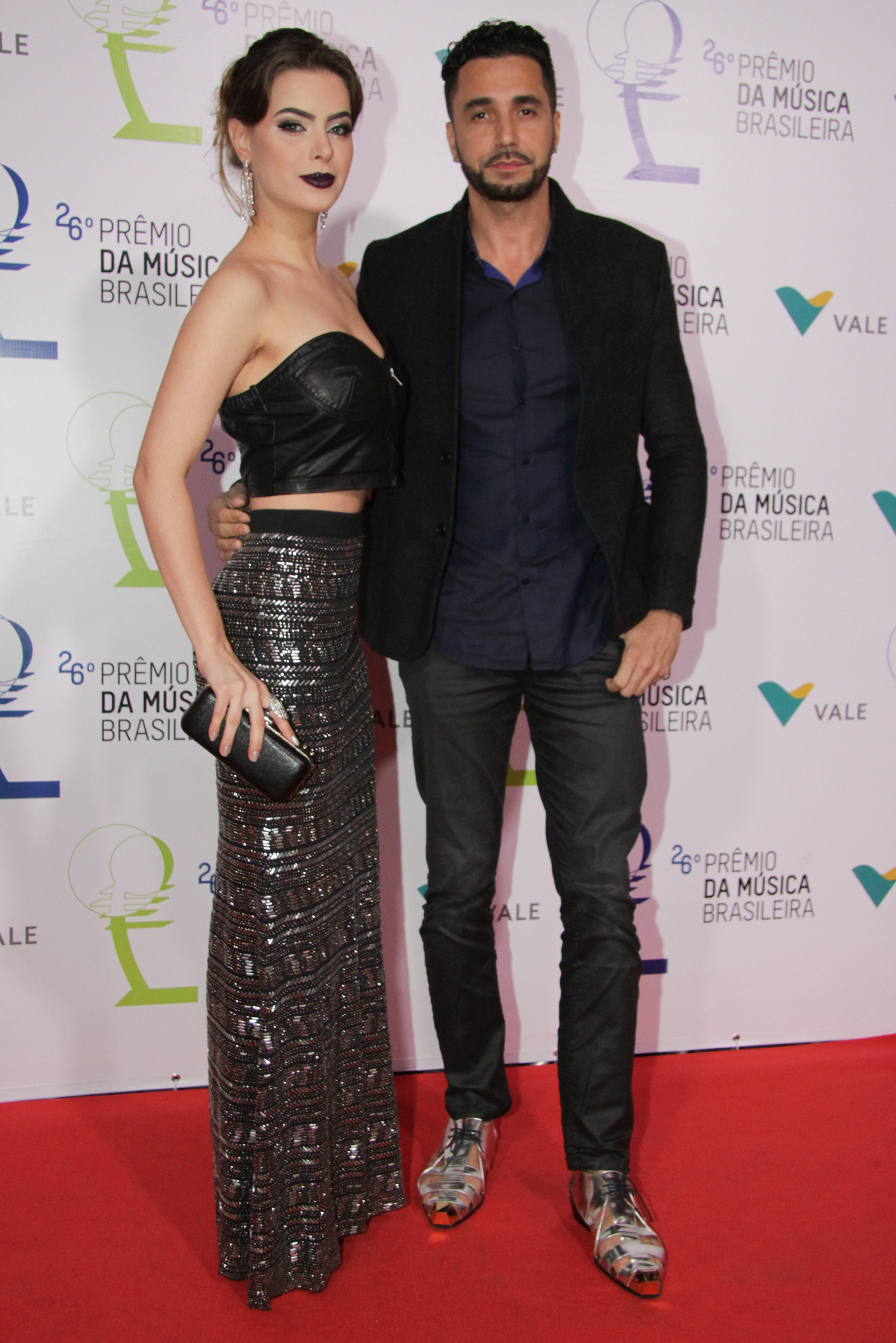
Latino.

Funk carioca is a type of dance music from Rio de Janeiro, derived from and was until the late 1990s, superficially similar to Miami bass. In Rio it is most often simply known as funk, although it is very different musically from what funk means in most other places and contexts. Like other types of hip-hop, funk carioca lifts heavily from samples such as international rips or from previous funk music. Many popular funk songs sampled music from the film Rocky. Funk was popularized in Rio's favelas in the 1980s, with songs like Feira de Acari by Mc Batata, with Furacão 2000, Mc Marlboro and Brazilian versions of freestyle songs by the singer Latino, later turning more aggressive in the 1990s, with precarious lyrics and several MCs with direct links with drug trafficking. Subgenres derived from funk carioca include funk melody, funk ostentação, proibidão, and rasteirinha.

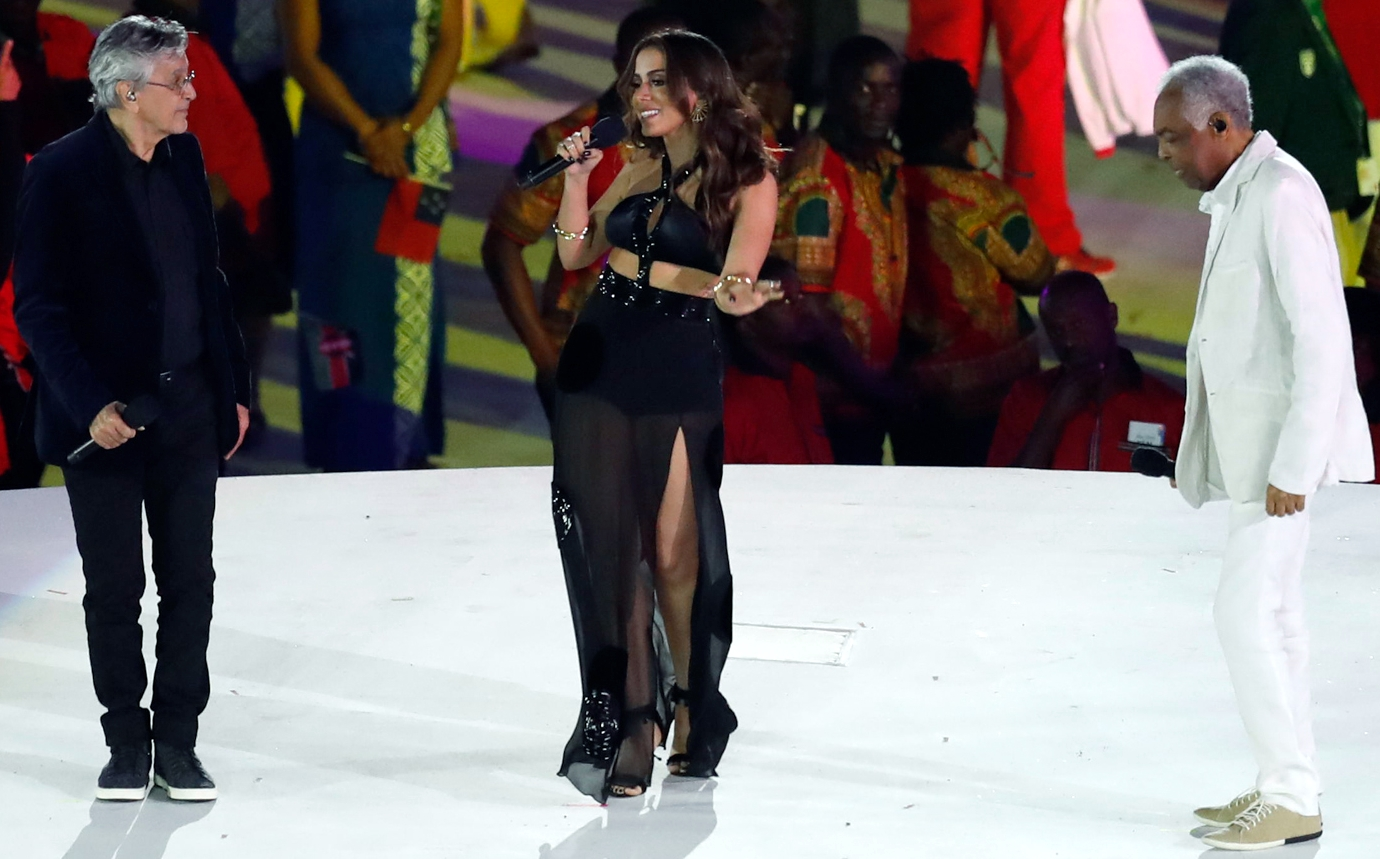
Anitta, (center) with singers Caetano Veloso (left) and Gilberto Gil (right) performing at the 2016 Summer Olympics opening ceremony

Singers such as Ludmilla and Anitta mixed funk carioca with pop and reggaeton, and their success propelled other funk carioca singers to adopt pop music in their repertoire. Thus a new generation of singers emerged, among them Valesca Popozuda, MC Biel, and Melody. The expansion of the genre in Brazil prompted singers of other styles to join the movement, such as Luan Santana, Banda Vingadora, Pabllo Vittar, Jhama, Gaby Amarantos, and Tiago Iorc.

In general, Rio de Janeiro funk receives criticism from sectors of the society for its significantly more violent and sexist lyrics compared to North American gangsta rap, including the explicit sexual appeal of some of its subgenres.

==== Funk automotivo ====
Funk automativo is a subgenre of Brazilian funk, mislabeled as "Brazilian phonk" outside of Brazil. Phonk is often conflated with funk automotivo. The genre gained the nickname "Brazilian phonk" following its popularization and success on social media. Popular in Brazil, it combines phonk with local cultural elements.

=== Hip-hop music ===
In São Paulo and other places in the south of Brazil, in more urban areas, hip-hop music is very popular. They dress similarly to American rappers.

Brazilian hip-hop is heavily associated with racial and economic issues in the country, where a lot of Afro-Brazilians live in economically disadvantaged communities, known in Brazil as favelas. São Paulo is where hip-hop began in the country, but it soon spread all over Brazil, and today, almost every big Brazilian city, including Rio de Janeiro, Salvador, Curitiba, Porto Alegre, Belo Horizonte, Recife and Brasília, has a hip hop scene. São Paulo has gained a strong, underground Brazilian rap scene since its emergence in the late 1980s with many independent labels forming for young rappers to establish themselves on.

=== Brazilian bass ===
Brazilian bass is a subgenre of house that originated as a derivation of mainstream deep house music of early 2010s, fused with tech house elements and some minimalistic influences from bass house. The tempo typically range from 120 to 125 bpm. The genre is characterized by distinguishable deep punchy basslines, often making use of low-pitched and filtering effects. The genre was created in Brasília around the mid-2010s, but its national and international repercussion only happened in 2016 with DJs Alok, Bruno Martini and Sevenn.

=== Brazilian electronic music ===
Electronic music in Brazil started in the 1980s, when the genre of music was getting popular in the world. The first event involving the genre of music in Brazil was in 1988 in São Paulo, with DJ Mau Mau. In the 1990s, the genre was getting bigger in Brazil and world, some of the most famous disk jockeys were DJ Marky and DJ Patife. In the 2000s, dubstep started getting famous in Brazil. Brazil has a lot of famous electronic music musicians, like Alok, Kasino, and Vintage Culture.

=== B-Pop ===
B-pop (short for the English Brazilian pop) or Brazilian pop music is a musical genre originating in Brazil, sung in Portuguese and sometimes English. The term B-pop first appeared in the Brazilian press to refer to groups such as Champs, one of the B-pop groups that was inspired by K-pop (Korean pop music).

However, the existence of Brazilian pop music predates the existence of K-pop-inspired groups, as there have already been artists and groups (including boy bands and girl groups) in the country who defined their music genre as pop (in this case, more inspired by North American pop), such as As Frenéticas and Rita Lee in the late 1970s, Dominó and Polegar in the 1980s, Lulu Santos also from the 1980s onwards, Fernanda Abreu and Latino in the 1990s, Kelly Key, Wanessa Camargo, KLB, Rouge, Br'oZ, Sandy & Junior in the 2000s. Some more recent artists such as Luísa Sonza, Jão, Vitor Kley and Marina Sena are representatives of pop in Brazil.

The television presenter, actress, and singer Xuxa, who also sings in Spanish and English and achieved international success in the 1980s, is considered a Brazilian icon. In total, she sold over 33 million albums, with her most famous hit being "Ilariê," which reached number one on the charts in almost every country in Latin America.

== Notable record labels ==
- Far Out Recordings
- Malandro Records
- Mr Bongo Records
- Som Livre

== See also ==
- List of Brazilian composers
- List of Brazilian singers and bands of Christian music
