= Warfare Noise =

Studio album / split album by Chakal, Mutilator, Sarcófago and Holocasto
- Released: November 30, 1986
- Recorded: August 1986
- Studio: J.G. Estudios
- Genres: Thrash metal; black metal; death metal
- Length: 30:42
- Label: Cogumelo

Warfare Noise is a split heavy metal album released on Cogumelo Records in 1986. The album features four Brazilian heavy metal bands: Chakal, Mutilator, Sarcófago, and Holocausto. A follow-up album titled Warfare Noise II was also released through Cogumelo Records in 1988. The record served as the debut for Sarcófago, and their appearance on the album ultimately led to them being signed to Cogumelo, their first label. In 2006, a one-off concert featuring Sarcófago was organized by Cogumelo and bass player Geraldo Minelli in celebration of the album's 20th anniversary.

== Track listing ==
| No. | Title | Artist | Length |
|---|---|---|---|
| 1. | "Cursed Cross" | Chakal | 5:56 |
| 2. | "Mr. Jesus Christ" | Chakal | 4:43 |
| 3. | "Believers of Hell" | Mutilator | 2:59 |
| 4. | "Nuclear Holocaust" | Mutilator | 3:31 |
| 5. | "Recrucify / The Black Vomit" | Sarcófago | 4:55 |
| 6. | "Satanas" | Sarcófago | 2:01 |
| 7. | "Destruição Nuclear" | Holocausto | 3:24 |
| 8. | "Escarro Napalm" | Holocausto | 3:13 |
| Total length: | | | 30:42 |

== Personnel ==
Chakal

- Willian Wiz – drums
- Mark – guitar
- Vladimir Korg – vocals
- Destroyer – bass

Mutilator

- Alexander "Magoo" – lead guitar
- Kleber – rhythm guitar
- Ricardo Neves – bass
- Rodrigo Neves – drums
- Silvio SDN – vocals

Sarcófago

- Wagner Moura Lamounier – vocals
- Geraldo "Gerald Incubus" Minelli – bass
- Zéder "Butcher" – guitar
- Armando "Leprous" Sampaio – drums

Holocausto

- Valério "Exterminator" – guitar
- Anderson "Guerrilheiro" – bass
- Nedson "Warfare" – drums
- Rodrigo "Führer" – vocals

== Production ==
- Ibsen – artwork
- Tarso Senra – engineering
- Patti Creusa Pereira De Faria – photography
