= Holocausto (band) =

Brazilian metal band

- Origin: Belo Horizonte, Minas Gerais, Brazil
- Genres: Thrash metal, black metal, war metal
- Years active: 1985–1994, 2004–2018
- Labels: Cogumelo, Nuclear War Now!
- Members: Valério Exterminator (vocals, guitar); Anderson Guerrilheiro (bass, vocals); William Morais (drums)
- Past members: Marco Antônio (bass); Nedson Warfare (drums); Rodrigo Führer (drums, vocals); Armando Nuclear Soldier (drums); Renato da Costa (guitar); João Marcelo (bass); Rossano Polla (vocals); Rodrigo dos Anjos (guitar)
- Website: holocaustowarmetal.kit.net

Holocausto is a thrash metal band from Belo Horizonte, Brazil, formed in 1985 by Marco Antônio, Valério Exterminator and Rodrigo dos Anjos. They have released five records through Cogumelo Records. Journalist Eduardo Rivadavia described them as "possibly the most controversial Brazilian heavy metal band ever".

== History ==
Marco Antônio (bass), Valério Exterminator (vocals and guitar), and Rodrigo dos Anjos (guitar) formed Holocausto in 1985. After recording the demo Massacre that year and contributing to Cogumelo's Warfare Noise I, the band's 1987 debut record, Campo de Extermínio, caused controversy. While previous South American bands such as Sepultura, Vulcano and Sarcófago had dabbled in anti-Christian sentiment and Satanism, Holocausto vividly described Nazi atrocities in concentration camps, leading to accusations of antisemitism. The band have claimed that they were "only trying to expose the horrors of the Holocaust in all its gruesome detail", and "that the album's shocking and unflinching descriptions were simply meant to show their own revulsion to the events that had inspired their name".

The band continued with numerous line-up changes, releasing a series of albums through Cogumelo Records, without capitalizing on their early notoriety. 1988's Blocked Minds and 1990's Negatives were thrash-oriented and similar to Voivod's music, while 1993's Tozago as Deismno bore an industrial influence. These albums' lack of success has been ascribed to their line-up difficulties and their late adoption of English lyrics and their debut's subject matter. They reformed in 2004 and released the hardcore-tinged album De Volta ao Front in 2005.

On April 1, 2017, Holocausto released the extended play War Metal Massacre, returning to black metal.

The band's sixth studio album, Diário de Guerra, was released on July 31, 2019.

== Members ==
Final Line-Up

- Rodrigo Führer – lead vocals (1985–1987, 2015–2018), drums (1988–1994, 2004–2015)
- Valério Exterminator – guitar (1985–1987, 2004–2018), lead vocals (2004–2015)
- Anderson Guerrilheiro – bass (1986–1989, 2004–2018), lead vocals (1988–1989)
- Armando Nuclear Soldier – drums (1987, 2017–2018)

Former

- Marco Antônio – bass (1985–1986; died 1986)
- Renato da Costa – guitar (1988–1992)
- João Marcelo – bass (1989–1994)
- Rossano Polla – vocals (1989–1994)
- Rodrigo dos Anjos – guitar (1992–1994)
- Nedson Warfare – drums (1985–1987, 2015–2017)

Timeline

== Discography ==
- Massacre demo (1985)
- Warfare Noise I split LP (with Chakal, Mutilator, and Sarcófago; Cogumelo, 1986)
- Campo de Extermínio LP (Cogumelo, 1987)
- Blocked Minds LP (Cogumelo, 1988)
- Australoptecus Experience demo (Cogumelo, 1990)
- Negatives LP (Cogumelo, 1990)
- Tozago as Deismno LP (Cogumelo, 1993)
- De Volta ao Front LP (Cogumelo, 2005)
- Campo de Exterminio Show – 1987 DVD (Cogumelo, 2007)
- War Metal Massacre EP (Nuclear War Now!, 2017)
- Diário de Guerra LP (Nuclear War Now!, 2019)
