= Chakal =

Brazilian thrash metal band

- Origin: Belo Horizonte, Brazil
- Genre: Thrash metal
- Years active: 1985–present
- Label: Cogumelo Records
- Members: Vladimir Korg (vocals); Cassio Corsino (bass); William Wiz (drums); André (guitar); Mark (guitar)
- Past members: Marcelo Laranja (bass), Destroyer (bass), Giulano Toniolo(bass), Drews (bass), Eduardo Paulista S. (guitar), Stanley Soares (guitar), Pepeu Necromancer (guitar), Sgôto (vocals), Sergio (vocals)
- Website: http://www.myspace.com/chakalbr

Chakal (altered spelling of the Portuguese word for jackal; chacal) is a thrash metal band from Belo Horizonte, Brazil. The band formed in 1985 and has released five albums through Cogumelo Records. Its debut record, Abominable Anno Domini, has been described as an "influential, genre-defining" example of Brazilian heavy metal.

== History ==
Chakal was formed in early 1985 by William Wiz (drums), Destroyer (bass), and Mark (guitars) in Belo Horizonte, home of Mutilator, Holocausto, Sarcófago and Sepultura. Shortly after forming, they played the Metal BH II Festival, fronted by Sgôto, alongside Sarcófago, Sepultura, Sagrado Inferno, Armageddon and São Paulo's Minotauro. They followed this up with frequent local shows. They recruited Vladimir Korg (vocals) and Pepeu Necromancer (both ex-Megathrash). The band produced its debut demo, Children Sacrifice, in 1986, featuring guest appearances from Max Cavalera of Sepultura and SDN of Mutilator. They contributed two tracks to Cogumelo Records' Warfare Noise I compilation that year ("Cursed Cross" and "Mr. Jesus Christ").

By the time of their debut album, Abominable Anno Domini, Chakal's line-up had settled down to Vladimir Korg on vocals (also credited with the lyrics to Sepultura's "To the Wall"), guitarists Mark and Pepeu, bassist Marcelo Laranja, and drummer William Wiz. The album was recorded in August 1987 at Belo Horizonte's JG Studios. According to Eduardo Rivadavia of Allmusic, the band's debut "turned out to be one of the most vicious, extreme but accomplished Brazilian thrash/black metal albums released in the landmark year of 1987". The album was reissued in 2005 by Cogumelo with bonus tracks from 1988's Living with the Pigs single, recorded at JG Studios in October 1988. Shortly after the Abominable Anno Domini sessions, Pepeu left the band.

Korg left in April 1989 to join The Mist, leaving Laranja to assume vocals. Eduardo Simões joined on guitar. These line-up changes prevented the band from capitalising on the success of its debut, with extended periods of inactivity. They released 1990's The Man Is His Own Jackal and 1993's Death Is a Lonely Business, before a hiatus of nearly a decade.

In 2002, the band reunited with Korg to play a few shows, and over the course of two years, wrote an album based on a screenplay by Korg and inspired by George A. Romero's Living Dead film series. After rehearsals and pre-production, the result was the album Deadland, released in 2003. Influenced by comics and RPGs, the album came with a multimedia track with lyrics, photos and other information. The album release was followed by a Brazilian tour dubbed the Dead Man Walking Tour. A further album, Demon King, was released in 2004, with the returning Mark on guitar and a cover of Death's "Evil Dead". The self-released sixth album, Destroy! Destroy! Destroy!, came out on 16 November 2013, featuring Vladimir Korg, Andrevil, Wiz, Mark and Cassio Corsino on bass.

Korg left to reform The Mist.

Marcelo Laranja returned to the band to work on the new album.

In 2017 they re-recorded The Man is His Own Jackal, releasing it as Man is a Jackal 2 Man. Former guitar player Eduardo Simões, then with Nine Red Moons, played lead guitar on the song "In Vain".

They played new songs in Cogumelo Quarantine Sessions. The song "The Enemy" is on YouTube.

=== Current line-up ===
- André (guitar and vocals)
- William Wiz (drums)
- Mark (guitar)

=== Previous members ===
- Vladimir Korg (vocals)
- Cassio Corsino (bass)
- Marcelo Laranja (bass)
- Destroyer (bass)
- Giulano Toniolo (bass)
- Drews (bass)
- Eduardo Paulista S. (guitar)
- Stanley (guitar)
- Pepeu (guitar)
- Sgoto (vocals)
- Sergio (vocals)

== Discography ==
- Children Sacrifice (demo, 1986)
- Warfare Noise I (split LP with Mutilator, Holocausto and Sarcófago; Cogumelo, 1986)
- Abominable Anno Domini LP (Cogumelo, 1987)
- Living with the Pigs EP (Cogumelo, 1988)
- The Man Is His Own Jackal LP (Cogumelo, 1990)
- Death Is a Lonely Business LP (Cogumelo, 1993)
- Deadland LP (Cogumelo, 2003)
- Demon King LP (Cogumelo, 2004)
- Destroy! Destroy! Destroy! (self-released, 2013)
- Man is a Jackal 2 Man (Cogumelo, 2018)
