= Mutilator =

Brazilian musical group

- Origin: Belo Horizonte, Brazil
- Genres: Death metal, thrash metal
- Years active: 1985–1989; 2018-present
- Label: Cogumelo Records
- Past members: Kleber (vocals, bass, guitar); CM (guitar); Alexander "Magoo" (guitar, vocals); Armando Sampaio (drums); Ricardo Neves (bass); Rodrigo Neves (drums); Marcelo (vocals); Silvio SDN (vocals)
- Website: Mutilator at Cogumelo

Mutilator is a Brazilian extreme metal band formed in 1985 in Belo Horizonte. They released two full-length records through Cogumelo Records in the 1980s.

Eduardio Rivadavia of AllMusic characterized the band as performing "a technical style of blackened thrash."

== History ==
Mutilator was formed as Desaster in 1985 in Belo Horizonte by vocalist/guitarist Kleber, guitarist/lyricist Alexander "Magoo", bassist Ricardo Neves and his brother Rodrigo on drums. The band changed their name to Mutilator after they added Sepultura roadie Silvio SDN on vocals. This line-up recorded the Bloodstorm and Grave Deseccration demos, and contributed the tracks "Believers of Hell" and "Nuclear Holocaust" to the Cogumelo Records compilation Warfare Noise I in 1986.

By 1987, Silvio SDN left the band, and the band recorded their debut album for Cogumelo, Immortal Force, with Kleber on vocals. The album was recorded on a small budget but has had long-lasting appeal. Eduardo Rivadavia of Allmusic described it as "an excellent case study in DIY ethics and the desire to succeed against all odds", and commented, "when held up against its improbable origins, many of its deficiencies can't help but be ignored, and may well explain the album's enduring appeal in the eyes of serious metal collectors". The album has been compared to the works of Sepultura, Sarcófago, Vulcano, Kreator, Anthrax, Slayer, Metallica, Possessed and Bathory The album had little international impact, and led only to limited national touring. Magoo had faith in Mutilator's potential and turned down an offer to replace Jairo T. in Sepultura, a position eventually taken by Andreas Kisser.

A different lineup released second album Into the Strange in 1988, following the departure of the Neves siblings. Magoo took over on vocals, also wrote all the lyrics and much of the music. CM (on guitars) and drummer Armando Sampaio (ex-Holocausto) joined the band for the album. Recorded and mixed in 16 tracks at Belo Horizonte's JG Studios, the album "held the distinction of being Brazilian heavy metal's most professional domestic production yet". The album fell short of commercial expectations, and Mutilator split up shortly after release.

The band reformed in April 2018.

== Band members ==
=== Last known line-up ===
- Pedro Ladeira (vocals)
- Igor Podrão (guitar)
- Cesar Pessoa (guitar)
- Rodrigo Neves (drums)
- Ricardo Neves (bass)

=== Previous members ===
- Ricardo Neves (bass)
- Rodrigo Neves (drums)
- Marcelo (vocals)
- Silvio SDN (vocals)

== Discography ==
- Bloodstorm (demo, 1986)
- Grave Desecration (demo, 1986)
- Warfare Noise I split LP (with Chakal, Holocausto and Sarcófago; Cogumelo, 1986)
- Immortal Force (Cogumelo, 1987)
- Into the Strange (Cogumelo, 1988)
