= Vulcano (band) =

Brazilian extreme metal band

- Origin: Santos, São Paulo, Brazil
- Genres: Black metal; death metal; thrash metal
- Years active: 1981–present
- Labels: Cogumelo; Renegados Records; Sangue Frio Produções
- Members: Luiz Carlos Louzada; Zhema Rodero; Ivan Pellicciotti; Arthur Von Barbarian
- Past members: Angel; José Piloni; Arthur Justo; Renato Pelado; Zé Flávio; Hansen; Lander (Lucho); André Martins; Passamani; FernandoNonath; Carlos Diaz
- Website: vulcanometal.com

Vulcano is a Brazilian extreme metal band from Santos, São Paulo. Founded in 1981, it is one of the first Brazilian heavy metal bands of note; with reference to their influence on the Latin American black metal scene, Terrorizer reported that "many believe that Vulcano not only kick-started musical blasphemy in Brazil, but throughout the whole of Latin America". Vulcano is noted as an influence on Sepultura.

== History ==
Vulcano was launched in 1981 in Santos, São Paulo, Brazil by Zhema Paul Magrão and Carli Cooper. Due to their early date of formation, Vulcano is regarded as one of the first bands in the Brazilian and Latin American extreme metal scene. However, unlike the development of extreme metal scenes in Europe and the United States, Brazil's extreme metal scene did not develop out of much of an existing metal scene, so musicians of early bands like Vulcano had to build a network to promote and support their live performances from scratch. It was also difficult to acquire standard performing equipment.

The band's first record, Om Pushne Namah, was released in 1983, and is different from most early extreme metal in that the lyrics were sung in Portuguese, not English. The release of this album also marks the departure of Jose Piloni (drums) from the band. In this early period, it was very difficult to secure live performances, and the band had to produce their own shows, and promotion was limited to pasting up posters, but Vulcano persevered, and moved forward in 1984 to release the demo Devil on My Roof.

Vulcano released a live recording, Live!, in 1985 to gain exposure to a greater audience outside of their home city of Santos. Live! was recorded in August in the city of Americana, without any mixing, and with a lineup of Zhema (bass), Soto Junior (guitar), Zé Flávio (guitar), Lauder Piloni (drums) and Angel (vocals). This served as preparation for Vulcano to record Bloody Vengeance, their first studio album, in 1986. In the years following the band released Anthropophagy (1987) and Who Are the True (1988). Throughout this period, Vulcano got access to increasingly better production as the metal scene in Brazil grew further. However, after releasing their fifth album Rat Race in 1990, Vulcano stopped releasing new albums for several years. In this period of reflection the Vulcano still did some live shows, but the only official release from the band was a Cogumelo Records compilation from 2000 with a re-release of the song "Bloody Vengeance".

In December 2001, Vulcano were taken by surprise by the death of Soto Jr. (guitar), who died of high blood pressure. In 2004, Vulcano created its own label Renegados Records and staged a comeback with a new album entitled Tales from the Black Book with Zhema (bass), Angel (vocals), Arthur Von Barbarian (drums), Andre Martins (guitar) and Claudio Passamani (guitar). In 2006 Vulcano released two new songs in a split vinyl titled Thunder Metal with Nifelheim from Sweden, with the songs "The Evil Always Return" and "Suffered Souls". In 2009, Vulcano released another album, Five Skulls and One Chalice.

In 2010, Angel left the band again. In his place, Vulcano recruited Luiz Carlos Louzada (Hierarchical Punishment, Chemical Disaster) to assist in the band's first tour in Europe, the so-called Bloody Vengeance Tour in Europe 2010, which went through 14 countries, playing 18 shows.

In 2011, the band invited Arthur Von Barbarian to resume the sticks and record the album Drowning in Blood, released in September through Renegados Records.

In 2013, they released The Man the Key the Beast, and made their third European tour together with the band Nifelheim in the Thunder Metal tour followed by a Brazilian tour and established with Zhema (guitar), Luiz Louzada (vocals), Arthur Von Barbarian and Ivan Pellicciotti the Darkest (bass guitar, who has been also Vulcano's producer since 2005).

== Musical style and legacy ==
Vulcano heavily influenced the music of fellow Brazilian metal band Sepultura. According to Eduardo Rivadavia of AllMusic: "Vulcano's albums were far too inaccessible to surface above the heavy metal underground with any regularity; and yet, alongside fellow Brazilians Sarcofago, Mutilator, and others, their primal, astoundingly violent blend of black and thrash metal has attained a worldwide cult legend among some of the genre's most extreme practitioners -- notably, Norway's feared black metal inner circle of the early '90s."

== Band members ==
- Zhema Rodero – guitar (1981–present)
- Arthur Von Barbarian – drums (1987–present)
- Luiz Carlos – vocals (1997–1999, 2010–present)
- Ivan Pellicciotti The Darkest – bass guitar (2013–present)

== Discography ==
=== Studio albums ===
- Bloody Vengeance (1986)
- Anthropophagy (1987)
- Who Are the True (1988)
- Ratrace (1990)
- Tales from the Black Book (2004)
- Five Skulls and One Chalice (2009)
- Drowning in Blood (2011)
- The Man the Key the Beast (2013)
- Wholly Wicked (2014)
- XIV (2016)
- Eye in Hell (2020)
- Stone Orange (2022)
- Epilogue (2024)

=== Demos and EPs ===
- Om Pushne Namah (1983)
- Devil on My Roof (1984)

=== Live albums ===
- Live! (1985)
- Live II! Stockholm Stormed (2014)

=== Splits ===
- Thunder Metal (2006) with Nifelheim
- Panzer Fest 2 (2013)
