= Cogumelo Records =

Brazilian independent record label

- Founded: 1985
- Distributor: Relapse
- Genre: Extreme metal
- Country of origin: Brazil
- Location: Belo Horizonte, Minas Gerais
- Official website: http://www.cogumelo.com/

Cogumelo Records is a Brazilian independent record label that concentrates on heavy metal bands.

Cogumelo Records first began as a record store in Belo Horizonte in 1980 and in 1985 became a record label. The same year the label would release a split album by Overdose and Sepultura.

In 1986, they released Sepultura's first album, Morbid Visions.

== Signed bands and previous artists ==
- Absolute Disgrace
- Akerbeltz
- Attomica
- Calvary Death
- DeFalla
- Chakal
- Drowned
- Hammurabi
- Headhunter DC
- Holocausto
- Impurity
- Kamikaze
- Lethal Curse
- Lustful
- Mutilator
- Overdose
- Pathologic Noise
- Pato Fu
- Perpetual Dusk
- Sarcófago
- Scourge
- Sepultura
- Sextrash
- Siecrist
- Siegrid Ingrid
- Sociedade Armada
- Thespian
- Vulcano
- Witchhammer
