= Rotting (EP) =

EP by Sarcófago
- Released: August 1989
- Recorded: 1989
- Studio: J.G. Studio in Belo Horizonte
- Genres: Black metal; thrash metal; death metal
- Length: 32:44
- Label: Cogumelo
- Producer: Gaugin

Sarcófago chronology
I.N.R.I. (1987)	Rotting (1989)	The Laws of Scourge (1991)

Professional ratings
Review scores
Source	Rating
AllMusic	3/5 stars
Kerrang!	1/5 stars

Rotting is an EP by the Brazilian extreme metal band Sarcófago, released in August 1989. Prior to recording, drummer Eduardo "D.D. Crazy" left the band to join Sextrash and was replaced by Manoel "M. Joker" Henriques. The EP was recorded following a brief tour to promote the band's debut release I.N.R.I. and was licensed to Music for Nations in Europe. The EP's cover was censored upon its release in the US. Later, the EP was seized by the authorities from European importers and distributors, once again because of its controversial cover, which depicts what appears to be a traditional grim reaper making out with Jesus Christ.

The EP features a much more technical approach than the band's previous effort I.N.R.I.. Additionally, instead of a collection of relatively short songs, the EP features four tracks over 6 minutes in length, the longest, "Tracy", nearly reaching the 9 minute mark. The EP does, however, retain the sound of I.N.R.I., featuring several tempo and riff changes in amongst odd song structures, with "Tracy" containing approximately 20 riffs. The EP is also noticeably fast with the average tempo for each song being 260 beats per minute.

Although Wagner Lamounier is the only guitarist present on the EP, the guitar tracks have been given a stereo mix whereby they can be heard in two channels instead of one; the guitar in the right channel has had its pitch altered slightly, giving the impression that there are two guitarists playing simultaneously.

== Track listing ==
All tracks are written by Wagner "Antichrist" Lamounier, unless stated otherwise.

No.	Title	Writer(s)	Length
1.	"The Lust"		0:29
2.	"Alcoholic Coma"		6:07
3.	"Tracy"		8:52
4.	"Rotting"		7:05
5.	"Sex, Drinks And Metal"	Incubus, Antichrist	3:30
6.	"Nightmare"	Butcher, Antichrist	6:44

== Credits ==
Sarcófago

- Wagner "Antichrist" Lamounier – lead vocals, guitar
- Geraldo "Incubus" Minelli – backing vocals, bass
- Manoel "M. Joker" Henriques – backing vocals, drums, percussion

Additional musicians

- Eugênio "Dead Zone" – keyboards
- Oswaldo "Pussy Ripper" Scheid – backing vocals
- Vladimir Korg – backing vocals
- Eduardo "D.D. Crazy" – backing vocals
