= Hate (Sarcófago album) =

Studio album by Sarcófago
- Released: March 1994
- Recorded: 1994
- Studios: Dramma & Polifonia Studios, Belo Horizonte, Brazil
- Genres: Death metal; black metal
- Length: 34:14
- Label: Cogumelo

Sarcófago chronology
Crush, Kill, Destroy (1992)	Hate (1994)	The Worst (1997)

Professional ratings
Review scores
Source	Rating
Spirit of Metal	8.5/10 stars

Hate is the third studio album by Brazilian extreme metal band Sarcófago, released in March 1994 through Cogumelo Records. It has a more stripped-down approach than their previous record, The Laws of Scourge (1991).

Hate is also notable for its controversial use of a drum machine. At the time, Sarcófago were attempting to become the fastest band in the world, and there were no drummers in their native Brazil who could play at the required speeds. Frontman Wagner Lamounier claimed to have no qualms about using this device, on the basis that most death metal drummers use trigger pads for recording purposes, which in the end produces the same homogenized sound as that of a drum machine.

== Track listing ==
No.	Title	Length
1.	"Intro: Song for My Death"	2:30
2.	"Pact of Cum"	3:54
3.	"The God's Faeces"	3:41
4.	"Satanic Terrorism"	2:06
5.	"Orgy of Flies"	4:35
6.	"Hate"	2:24
7.	"The Phantom"	4:50
8.	"Rhabdovirus (The Pitbull's Curse)"	3:03
9.	"Anal Vomit"	5:20
10.	"The Beggar's Uprising"	1:51

- "Satanic Terrorism" is about the "Inner Circle" church burnings in Norway that occurred during the early 1990s. Sarcófago was briefly accused of supporting these acts, but Lamounier has insisted that this is untrue.
- The lyrics to "Orgy of Flies" contains the lines "War after war/We haven't learned nothing/Hate is still alive" and "Over a billion corpses/Orgy of flies" which seems to clarify their stance on hate and murder.

== Personnel ==
- Wagner Lamounier – lead vocals, guitar
- Gerald Minelli – backing vocals, bass
- Eugênio "Dead Zone" – keyboards, drum programming

=== Additional personnel ===
(Taken from liner notes)

- Marcos Machado – backing vocals on tracks 1, 4 and 5
- "Andreia" – backing vocals on track 6
- Eduardo Paulista – lead guitar on track 6
- Tarson Senra – backing vocals on track 10
