= Brazilian thrash metal =

Music genre

Brazilian thrash metal is a musical movement that originated in the 1980s. Though not as large or well known as the North American or European thrash metal movements, it bridged the gap of the mid-1980s and the death metal scene later in the decade and the first-wave of black metal. Brazilian thrash metal grew from a blend of thrash, progressive, and death metal influences from around the world. Brazilian political upheaval was particularly influential in popularizing the genre. Lack of resources led bands to self-release their music, rather than turning to a label. This style of thrash metal includes fast-paced rhythms and vocals. Although some bands, like Sepultura and Nervosa, have become mainstream, the scene remains mostly underground.

== History ==
Cover of Ultimatum Split by Dorsal Atlântica and Metalmorphose, 1984

=== 1980s ===
During the early 80s, bands from the United States, Germany and Canada, such as Metallica and Slayer (U.S.), Destruction and Kreator (Germany), and Voivod and Exciter (Canada) appeared. During this time, Brazil experienced a shift from dictatorship to democracy, while also facing economic instability. At the same time, Brazil had a growing metal and rock scene and was influenced by the same music subgenres as their European and North American counterparts: New Wave of British Heavy Metal (NWOBHM) and hardcore punk.

Brazilian rock has its roots in the 1960s, developing from the movement called Jovem Guarda, which evolved into progressive rock and heavy metal. In 1982, the first Brazilian heavy metal LP was released by the band Stress, who is from the northern city Belém. The European and North American heavy metal and hardcore scenes influenced a majority of Brazilian bands, The first thrash metal (or speed metal) album released officially in Brazil in 1984 was a split album between two bands called Ultimatum, by Dorsal Atlântica and Metalmorphose. The album came out around the same time as Kill 'Em All by Metallica, War and Pain by Voivod, and Sentence of Death by Destruction.

In the late 1980s, Sepultura achieved success outside of Brazil. The last thrash metal albums to represent the "old-school" style of thrash in Brazil were Mass Illusion by Korzus (1991), Arise by Sepultura (1991), Rotten Authorities by Executer (1991), and The Laws of Scourge by Sarcófago (1991).

=== 1990s ===
Cover of Mental Slavery by MX from São Paulo, 1990

Entering the 90s, thrash was mixed with alternative metal, grunge, industrial music, and Brazilian traditional music.The combination of thrash and Brazilian traditional music is sometimes labelled as tribal metal. Sepultura and Overdose are credited to be the first and most important acts that mixed thrash with tribal sounds. Bands that did not simply disappear from the scene had to adapt their sound to new genres that were appearing in order to succeed.

Korzus brought the New York hardcore influences to their sound with their album, KZS. A band from Belo Horizonte named The Mist became an "industrial-thrash" band and Dorsal Atlântica turned into a hardcore/crust variant. Ratos de Porão experimented with alternative metal before returning to a more punk-influenced sound.

During the 1990s, the most important bands to appear in the decade were Scars, Distraught and Zero Vision. However, their sound had a greater influence from groove metal of Machine Head than thrash metal.

=== 2000 onward ===
In the 2000s, Brazilian metal expanded into a plethora of subgenres, including symphonic, progressive, and death metal. Additionally, newer urban cities in Brazil, such as Aracaju, sought inspiration from cities like São Paulo and Brasilia by adapting their own unique metal scene. A lot of these bands used Afro-Brazilian culture and rhythms to turn their music into something that piqued global interest. Metal soon turned into a resistance movement against political and social injustice.

There are a lot of new thrash metal bands coexisting with the old ones who returned. Since the year 2000, new bands have been releasing albums on independent record labels. Bands such as Torture Squad and Nervosa have been frequently touring across South America and Europe. The bands Executer and Holocausto returned. Soulfly's Vocalist Max Cavalera released an album that is combines "old-school" thrash with a blend of new and old styles.

== Regional scenes ==
Brazilian thrash metal originated in primarily the cities of Belo Horizonte, São Paulo and Rio de Janeiro. The most prominent of the three scenes was in Belo Horizonte, where the band Sepultura originated.

In Belo Horizonte, the scene had some of the more extreme bands, who had sounds similar to death metal. Bands such as Sepultura, Sarcófago and Mutilator continued further and were more extreme than the German thrash metal bands, as they were influenced by European extreme metal bands like Sodom and Hellhammer and had a very raw and primitive production, which "added to the atmosphere" according to their fans. Others would claim they "sounded 'worse' than their European counterparts". This was because the sound was not something Brazilian fans were used to at the time. The band Sarcófago wore an early form of corpse paint and their first album I.N.R.I. "was huge among Norwegian black metalers". Sarcófago, as well as Sepultura, were also important for a chaotic, non-Norwegian black metal style called war metal, characterized as an aggressive and fast genre. The first prominent band of the scene were Overdose, a traditional heavy metal act that became increasingly progressive and more aggressive over time. Jairo Guedz, the original guitarist of Sepultura, joined Overdose for a short period as a bass player. After disbanding, the lead guitarist of Overdose, Cláudio David, formed Elektra, and the drummer, André "Zé Baleia" Márcio, formed Eminence, in which Jairo joined as a bass player.

As Brazil's most populated city, São Paulo is the host of many music-related events. Here, the scene was closer to crossover thrash, which is more commonly known as American thrash. Bands such as Ratos de Porão and Lobotomia, played a style more akin to hardcore. The original thrash metal bands included Korzus and MX. The band Krisiun serves as a staple to death metal in São Paulo, resembling bands like Metallica and Death Angel. On the other side of the metal spectrum, Angra presents a more toned down, powerful, and emotional side to the genre. In the 1980s, Metal SP was released, comprising music from many São Paulo metal bands and predating the Rock in Rio Festival by just a few months. This compilation was so significant to the music scene that it encouraged American metal bands to take part in the festival. São Paulo is known for its unique variety of venues, in which metalheads come together to appreciate the blend of thrash, death, and punk metal. These include Manifesto Bar, Hangar 110, and The Carioca Club.

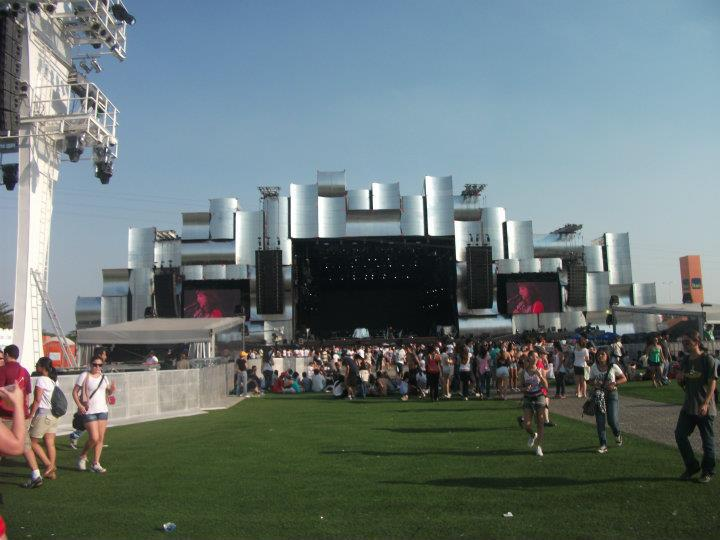
Stage at Rock in Rio festival in Rio de Janeiro

In Rio de Janeiro, metal does not have as big of a following. Genres like hip hop and funk have grown to be more popular in this city due to the socioeconomic complexities. Metal bands from Rio soudned similar to European bands of the time. Important bands from this time period were Taurus, Metrallion, and Antitese. In the 1985, the first Rock in Rio festival occurred, which was a 10 day long rock and metal festival, which attracted almost 1.4 million people from around the world. This event was a main contributor to the national spread of metal outside Rio de Janeiro and São Paulo. The festival has become such a big event, that it has expanded to other locations, such as Madrid, Las Vegas, and Lisbon. American singers and bands have also brought attention and fans to the festival. Today in Rio, Brazilian metal culture remains strong in the areas where they first flourished. The band Dorsal Atlântica has gained the respect of the city's people, proving to be a staple in the metal community. This band releases music only in Portuguese, which separates it from other Brazilian metal bands that either sing in only English or a hybrid of English and Portuguese. Sepultura's album Beneath the Remains was recognized as one of the best metal albums of 1989, which brought more attention to the growing metal scene in Rio.

== Cultural context ==
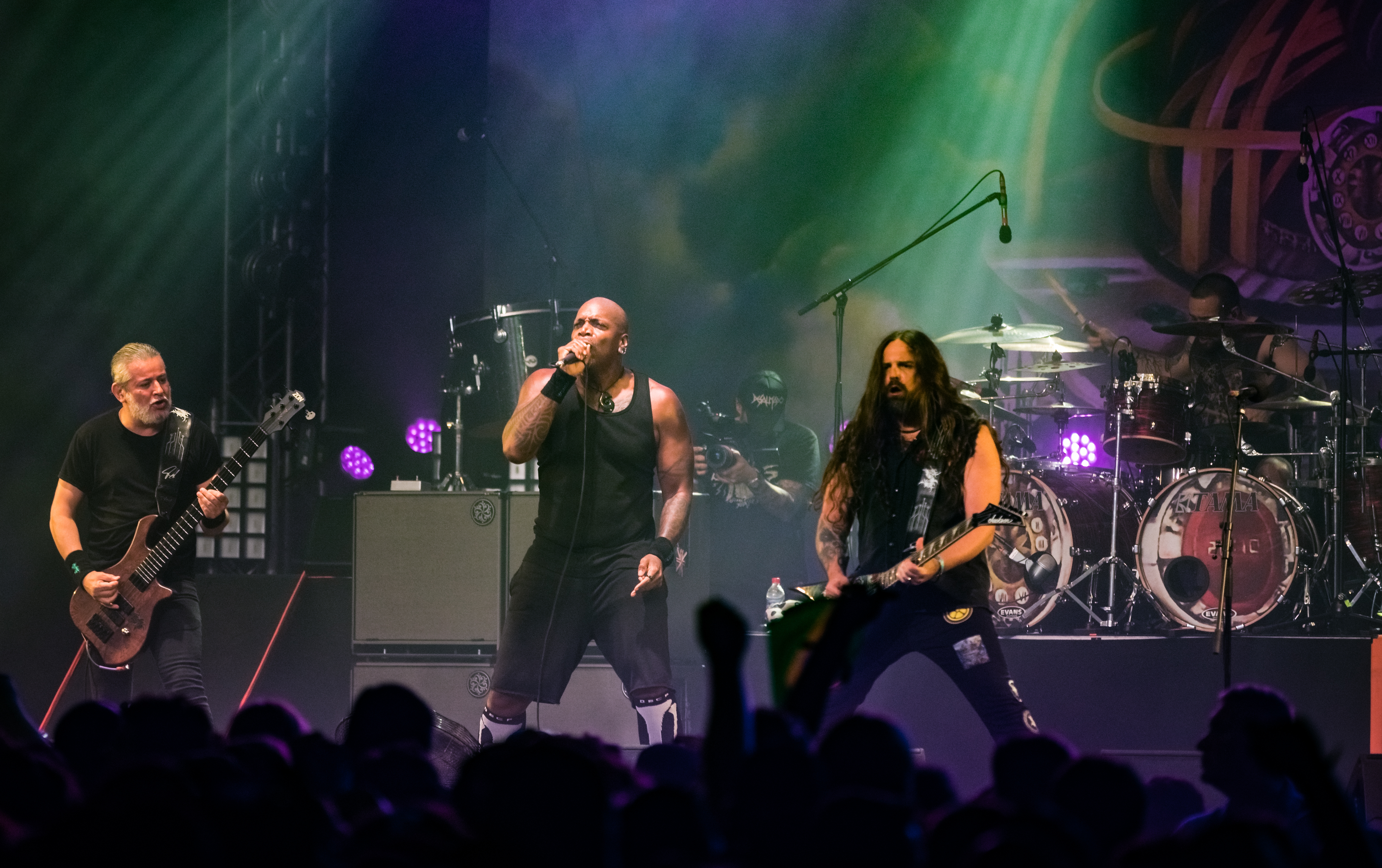
Sepultura on stage (2018)

Brazil has a history of colonization and slavery, which resulted in deeply-racialized modern social inequality, which has led to a sentiment to ignore racial and class structures in the Brazilian music scene. Additionally, metal in Brazil faces backlash because of its loudness and violent lyrics that come off as anti-religious and anti-government. Critics argue that these factors challenge Brazil's traditionally conservative social norms, which are influenced by religious and political ideologies. Despite this, Brazilian metal serves as a platform for expressing resistance and emotion, confronting the country's historical trauma.

Sepultura is a prime example of a metal band that initially had a more Western sound, but progressed to an anti-racist and traditionally Brazilian style of metal. They began incorporating Afro-Brazilian musical elements that resonated with their fans, such as tribal chants and drumming. Their goal was to challenge cultural hegemony within the region through strong sound and emotion. The band Black Pantera also addresses social and racial injustices in their music. The band's name is a tribute to the Black Panther Party, which was a civil rights group in the United States that's mission was to combat racism in the Americas.

The global reach of metal bands in Brazil demonstrates the power that music has on international borders, resonating with audiences facing similar struggles worldwide.

== Bibliography ==
- Avelar, Idelber. (2003). Heavy metal music in postdictatorial Brazil: Sepultura and the coding of nationality in sound. Journal of Latin American Cultural Studies, 12(3), 329-346.
- Avelar, Idelber (2011). "Chapter 3: Otherwise National: Locality and Power in the Art of Sepultura". In Wallach, Jeremy; Berger, Harris; Greene, Paul (eds.). Metal Rules the Globe: Heavy Metal Music Around the World. Duke University Press. pp. 135–160. ISBN 978-0-8223-4733-0.
- Avelar, Idelber. (2013). Defeated rallies, mournful anthems, and the origins of Brazilian heavy metal. In Brazilian popular music and globalization (pp. 123–135). Routledge.
- De Oliveira Castro, Á. L., & de Rezende, D. C. (2023). Music consumption and taste internalisation practices among educated Brazilian metal listeners and members of musical scenes. Poetics, 99, 101803.
- Dos Santos Silva, M. A., & Arruda Queiroz, T. (2023). Negotiating Blackness, and Culture in Brazilian Metal Scene. Journal of Black Studies, 54(5), 410-431.
- Garcia, M. V., & Gama, V. C. (2020). Brazilian native metal and the experience of transculturation. Metal Music Studies, 7(1), 171-177.
- Klausner, G. A. (2020). Differences in the Sociopolitical Perspectives of Brazilian and European Völkisch Metal. Heavy Metal Music in Latin America: Perspectives from the Distorted South, 265.
- Leão, Tom (1997). "Capítulo 17: O metal no Brasil" [Chapter 17: Metal in Brazil]. Heavy metal: Guitarras em fúria [Heavy Metal: Raging Guitars] (in Portuguese). São Paulo, Brazil: Editora 34. pp. 199–210. ISBN 85-7326-077-7.
- Ribeiro, H. (2016). Heavy, death and doom metal in Brazil: A study on the creation and maintenance of stylistic boundaries within metal bands. In Heavy Metal, Gender and Sexuality (pp. 227–244). Routledge.
- Sneed, P. M. (2001). Brazilian Popular Music and Globalization.
