= The Worst (Sarcófago album) =

Studio album by Sarcófago
- Released: December 1997
- Recorded: Between December 1996 and February 1997 at Drama & Polifonia Studios
- Genres: Death metal; industrial metal
- Length: 41:36
- Label: Cogumelo

Sarcófago chronology
Hate (1995)	The Worst (1997)	Crust (2000)

The Worst is the fourth and final studio album by the Brazilian extreme metal band Sarcófago. Wagner Lamounier and Gerald Minelli view this record as a "summation" of the band's career.

The Worst is notable for not only having a more death metal-oriented sound than the band's earlier works, but also containing traces of the then-popular genre of Industrial metal. The music is also slower than that on the band's previous album Hate and features a more prominent use of programmed drums.

The album cover features a photograph of Said Augusto, a close friend of the band.

== Track listing ==
No.	Title	Length
1.	"The End (Intro)"	1:16
2.	"The Worst"	6:32
3.	"Army of the Damned (The Prozac's Generation)"	4:35
4.	"God Bless the Whores"	7:27
5.	"Plunged in Blood"	4:38
6.	"Satanic Lust"	3:38
7.	"The Necrophiliac"	6:15
8.	"Shave Your Head"	3:33
9.	"Purification Process"	3:39

== Personnel ==
- Wagner Lamounier – lead vocals, guitar
- Gerald Minelli – backing vocals, bass
- Eugênio "Dead Zone" – keyboards, drum programming
