= Crush, Kill, Destroy =

EP by Sarcófago
- Released: March 1992
- Recorded: August 1991, JG Studios (BH, Brazil)
- Genre: Thrash metal; death metal
- Length: 23:16
- Label: Cogumelo

Sarcófago chronology
The Laws of Scourge (1991)	Crush, Kill, Destroy (1992)	Hate (1994)

Crush, Kill, Destroy is the second EP by Brazilian extreme metal band Sarcófago. It was released only in Brazil. All of the tracks on this EP can be found on The Laws of Scourge.

== Track listing ==
No.	Title	Length
1.	"Crush, Kill, Destroy"	5:30
2.	"Little Julie"	4:41
3.	"Midnight Queen"	6:20
4.	"Secrets of a Window"	6:45

Tracks 3 and 4 are remastered versions of those appearing on The Laws of Scourge.

== Personnel ==
- Wagner Lamounier – vocals, rhythm guitar
- Fabio Jhasko – lead guitar
- Gerald Minelli – bass, acoustic guitar
- Lucio Olliver – drums, percussion
