= Midnight Queen =

Midnight Queen may refer to:

- A song by Sarcófago from the album The Laws of Scourge
- A song by Nickelback from the album Here and Now
- A song by Goo Hara
- A song by Inkubus Sukkubus from the album Belladonna & Aconite
- Betty Thomas, nicknamed "The Midnight Queen"
