= Sextrash =

- Origin: Brazil
- Genre: Extreme metal
- Label: Greyhaze Records

Sextrash is a Brazilian extreme metal band formed in the 1980s. They were signed to Greyhaze Records. Decibel described their sound as "proto-blackened death metal". The site described the band's debut album Sexual Carnage as "nutty-meets-brutal-as-fuck", and considers it an obscure classic in the genre. Additionally, Greyhaze referred to the album as "beyond essential Brazilian filth". Former Sarcafago drummer D.D. Crazy performed drums on the album. The influence of the album has been observed in the work of Goat Semen.

== History ==
The band played Metal Threat in 2025.

== Musical style ==
Sextrash's sound has been compared to Sarcafago. Unlike many other bands of their ilk, the band avoided Satanism-related themes in their music, opting instead for lyrics pertaining to sexual intercourse. Sextrash bassist Krueger explained to Decibel: "We were so young and we all thought about sex a lot. Plus, so many bands were going into the Satanic thing. We thought we wanted to get away from that but still be extreme as all hell. Sex is awesome... thus Sextrash."
