= Mad Butcher =

EP by Destruction
- Released: 6 March 1987
- Recorded: December 1986 at Karo Studio
- Genre: Thrash metal
- Length: 18:56
- Label: Steamhammer/SPV
- Producer: Kalle Trapp

Destruction chronology
Eternal Devastation (1986)	Mad Butcher (1987)	Release from Agony (1987)

Professional ratings
Review scores
Source	Rating
AllMusic	2/5 stars

Mad Butcher is the second EP by German thrash metal band Destruction, released on 6 March 1987. It is the band's first studio recording featuring a four-piece lineup instead of a trio. Tommy Sandmann had left the band and two new members had entered the group: a new drummer, Oliver Kaiser, and a new guitarist, Harry Wilkens.

"Mad Butcher", the first song of the album, is a re-recording from the Sentence of Death EP with a faster tempo and double solos from Sifringer and Wilkens. The second song, "The Damned", is a cover song of the Plasmatics. The third song, "Reject Emotions", is a power ballad, but not really. Finally, "The Last Judgement" is an instrumental song played by Wilkens.

== Track listing ==
No.	Title	Length
1.	"Mad Butcher"	5:01
2.	"The Damned" (Plasmatics cover)	3:54
3.	"Reject Emotions"	6:50
4.	"The Last Judgement" (instrumental)	3:11
Total length:		18:56

== Personnel ==
Destruction

- Schmier – bass, vocals
- Harry Wilkens – lead guitar
- Mike Sifringer – rhythm guitar
- Oliver "Olli" Kaiser – drums

Production

- Kalle Trapp – production, mixing, recording
- Sebastian Krüger – cover painting
