= Nervosa (band) =

Brazilian thrash metal band

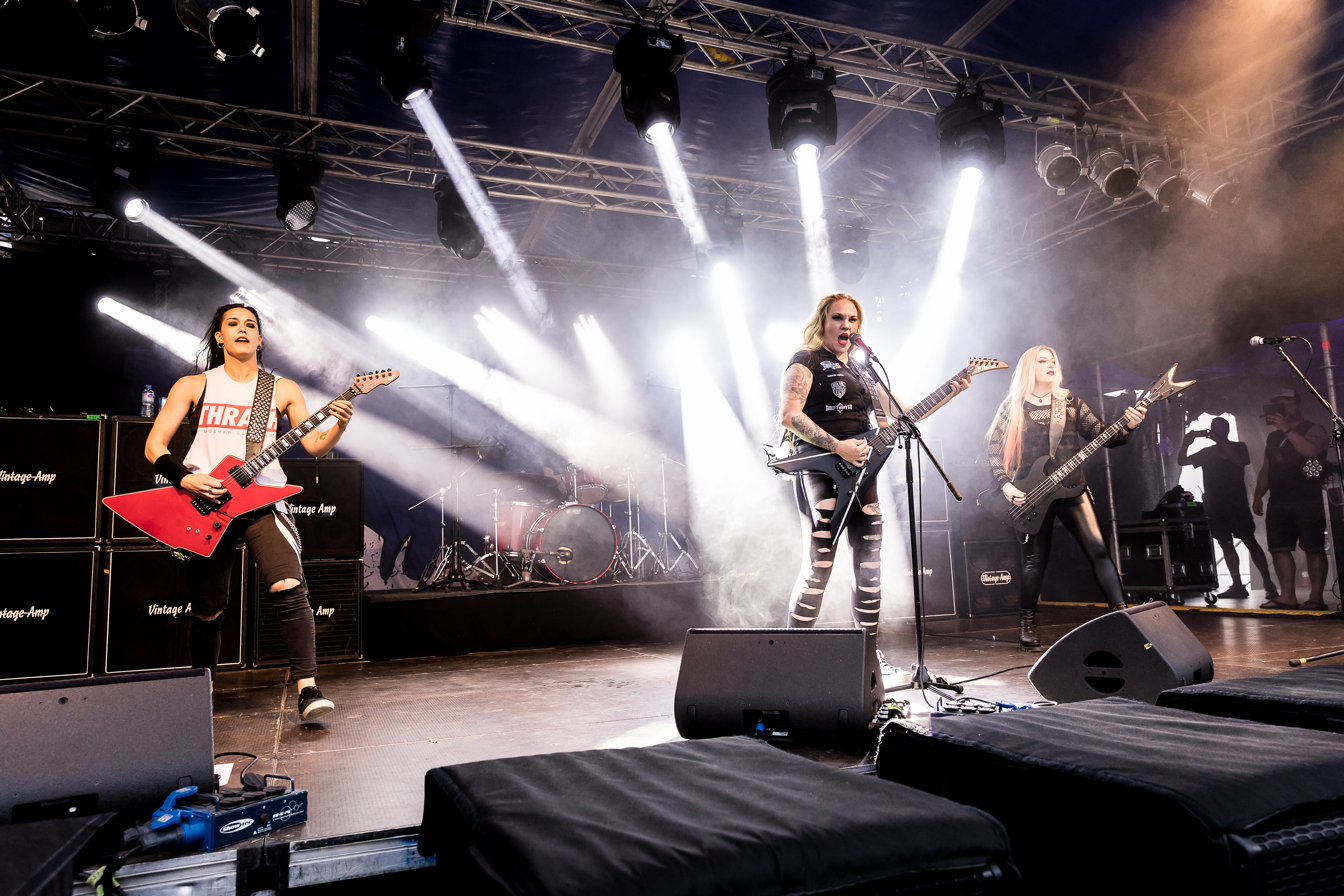
- Nervosa at Rock & Metal Day'z 2024 at Motorsport Arena Oschersleben

Background information
- Origin: São Paulo, Brazil
- Genres: Death metal, thrash metal
- Years active: 2010–present
- Label: Napalm
- Members: Prika Amaral; Helena Kotina; Hel Pyre; Michaela Naydenova; Emmelie Herwegh
- Past members: Fernanda Terra; Karen Ramos; Fernanda Lira; Jully Lee; Pitchu Ferraz; Luana Dametto; Mia Wallace; Eleni Nota; Diva Satánica; Nanu Villalba; Gabriela Abud
- Website: nervosaofficial.com

Nervosa is a Brazilian thrash/death metal band from São Paulo. The band is signed to Napalm Records and has released five studio albums and one EP.

== History ==
=== Foundation and Victim of Yourself (2010–2015) ===
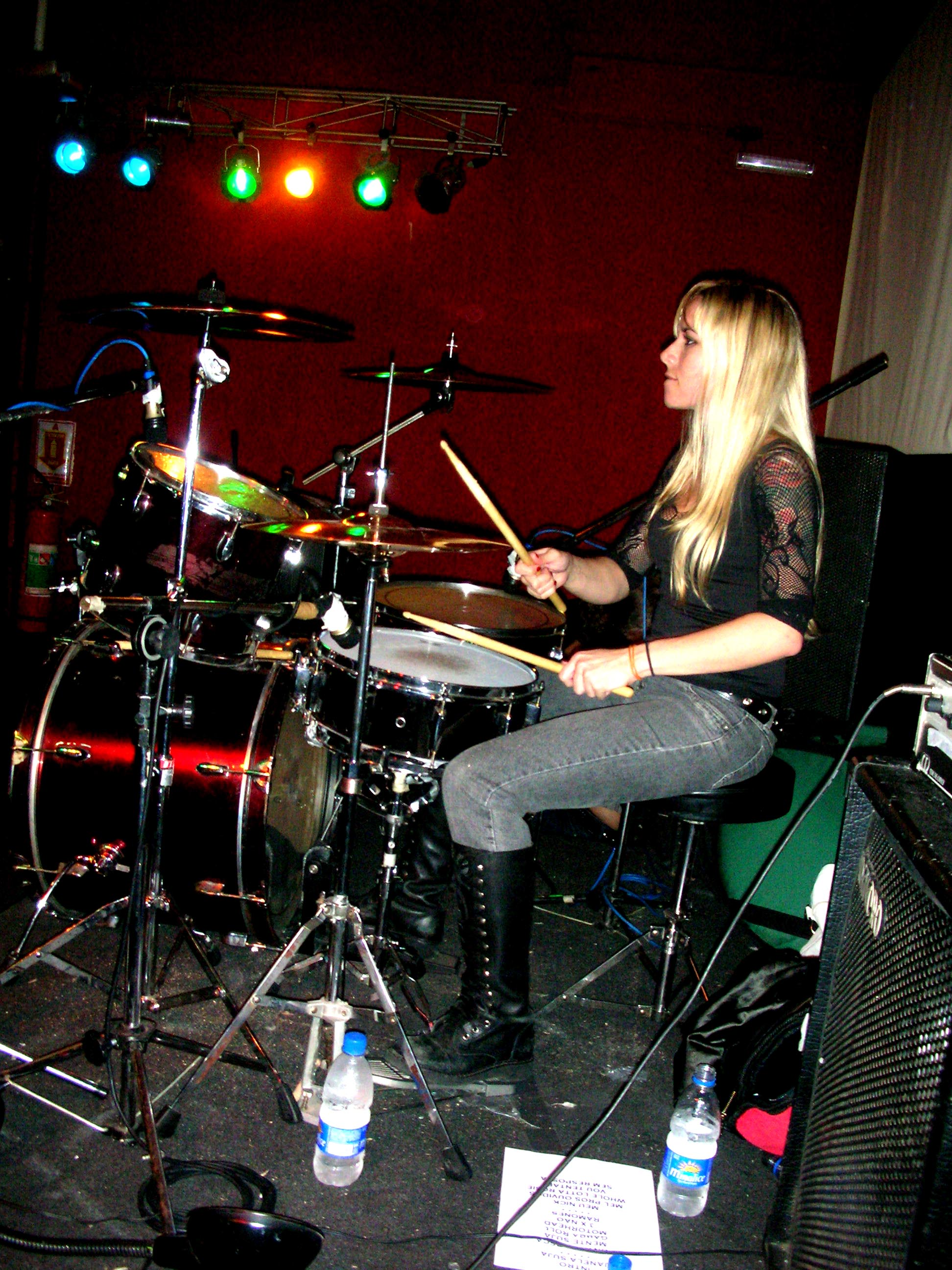
Former drummer and founding member Fernanda Terra played for the band from 2010 to late 2012

The band was founded in 2010 by guitarist Prika Amaral and drummer Fernanda Terra. Karen Ramos joined the band months later as a second guitarist. A year and a half later, bassist Fernanda Lira joined and Ramos left. Ramos lived far from São Paulo and was unable to rehearse. The remaining musicians, who had played in all-female bands, continued as a trio. In 2012, the band released the demo Time of Death, and produced a music video for the song "Masked Betrayer". Drummer Fernanda Terra left the band a short time later, and was replaced with Pitchu Ferraz. In May 2012, the band signed to Napalm Records. The band recorded their debut album in 2013, Victim of Yourself, produced by Heros Trench and Marcello Pompeu of Brazilian thrash metal band Korzus.

=== International recognition: Agony and Downfall of Mankind (2016–2019) ===
The recordings for the second studio album Agony started in January 2016 in the USA. It was produced by Brendan Duffey.

Centered around the core duo Prika Amaral-Fernanda Lira, in February 2018 the band recorded their third studio album Downfall of Mankind with new drummer Luana Dametto and producer Martin Furia: the album was released on June 1, 2018. João Gordo from the band Ratos de Porão, Rodrigo Oliveira from the band Korzus and Michael Gilbert from the band Flotsam and Jetsam appear as guest musicians. The band tours the world extensively. In July 2019, the single "Freakshow" was released.

=== A new start, Perpetual Chaos cycle (2020–2022) ===
In April 2020, bassist and vocalist Fernanda Lira and drummer Luana Dametto left Nervosa and found their own project Crypta; Amaral described the split as amicable and solely based on musical differences. They were replaced by vocalist Diva Satanica (Bloodhunter), bassist Mia Wallace (Abbath) and drummer Eleni Nota. With this new lineup, Nervosa as a four-piece recorded their fourth studio album Perpetual Chaos, which was released on January 22, 2021. Special guests have been Schmier from Destruction, Eric A.K. of Flotsam and Jetsam fame and Guiherme Miranda. Prika spoke about the international line-up which comprises now members from Brazil, Italy, Spain and Greece, as a logistic choice, saying that traveling questions and touring will work much better. Nervosa began touring worldwide in support of Perpetual Chaos a year after its release. As of April 2022, according to Diva Satánica, Nervosa has begun writing new material for their fifth studio album.

=== Amaral takeover on vocals: Jailbreak and Slave Machine (2023–present) ===
In late August 2022, it was announced drummer Eleni Nota had departed the band due to health issues and was being replaced by Nanu Villalba. Less than four months later, after completing the South American tour, it was announced that also Villalba had departed the band due to a "lack of common agreement".

Suddenly, the band parted ways with vocalist Diva Satánica in September 2022. In January 2023, becomes official that Helena Kotina (who already filled in on bass for Mia Wallace in 2022) joined the band as a second guitarist. It was revealed she was already working with Nervosa since March 2021 already, just a few months after the band released Perpetual Chaos, sharing ideas with Amaral.

In late March 2023, founding guitarist Prika Amaral once again revamps the band with a total new setup: she will also be the band's lead vocalist from that moment onrward, sharing guitar duties with Kotina, while bassist Mia Wallace - who cannot tour extensively anymore- has been replaced by Hel Pyre. The band's new drummer is session Michaela Naydenova. The band also released new singles "Endless Ambition" and "Seed of Death" from their upcoming album, Jailbreak, released on September 29, 2023.

In January 2024, Michaela Naydenova departed the band amicably, being replaced by Gabriela Abud. Nervosa establish themselves in Greece. Celebrating the 15 anniversary of the band, in the summer of 2025 a new single is published, Smashing Heads. Nervosa also make official the role of bassist Emmelie Herwegh, which since 2023 alternates with Hel Pyre. They both are considered part of the lineup.

In January 2026, the band revealed their sixth studio album, Slave Machine, is set to be released on April 3, 2026. Also in the press release for the album, it was revealed Michaela Naydenova had returned to the band. Alongside the announcement the band released the title track as the first single of the album, which also was accompanied by a video.

== Band members ==
Nervosa lineup live at Rock & Metal Day'z 2024 at Motorsport Arena Oschersleben

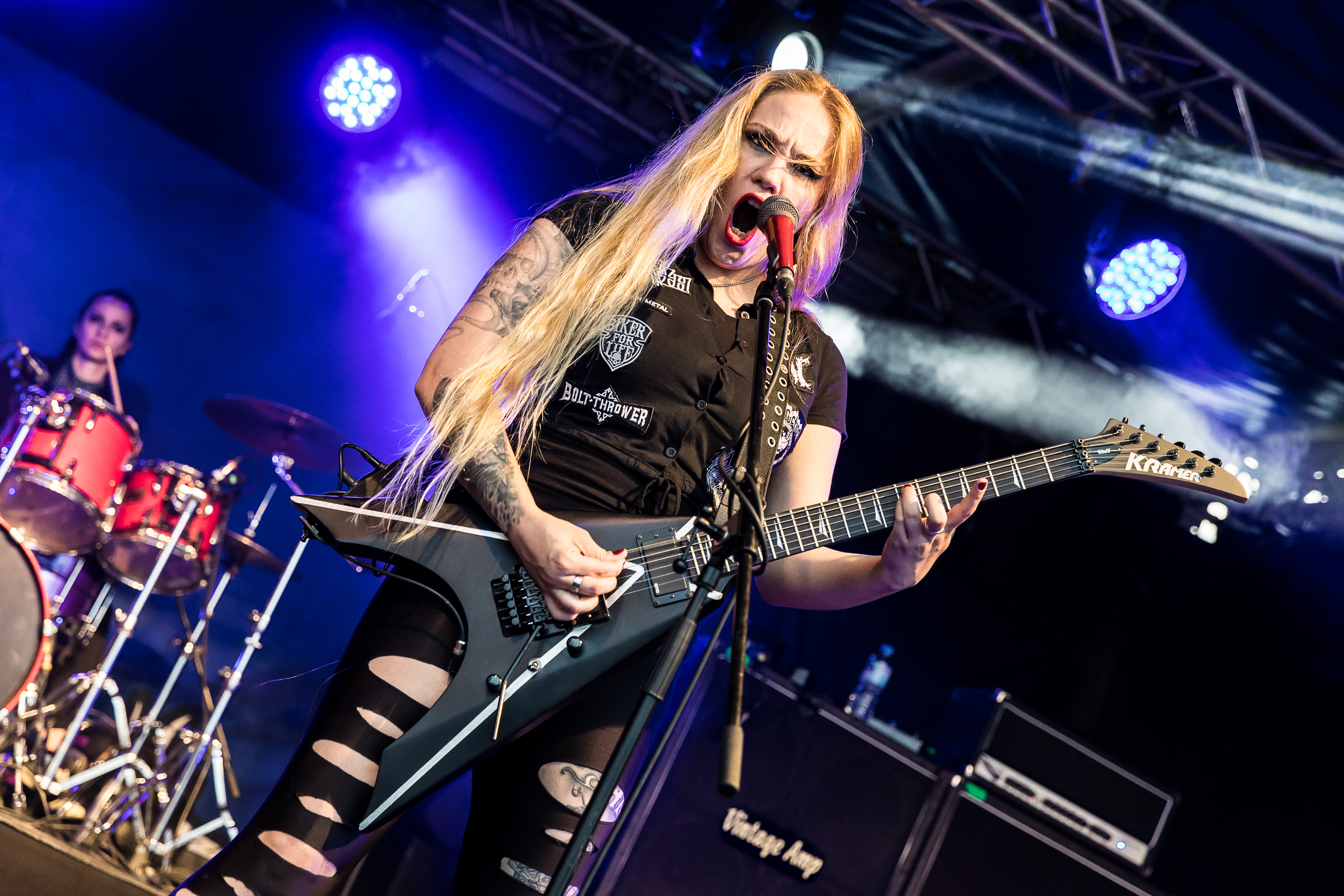
Singer and Guitarist Prika Amaral

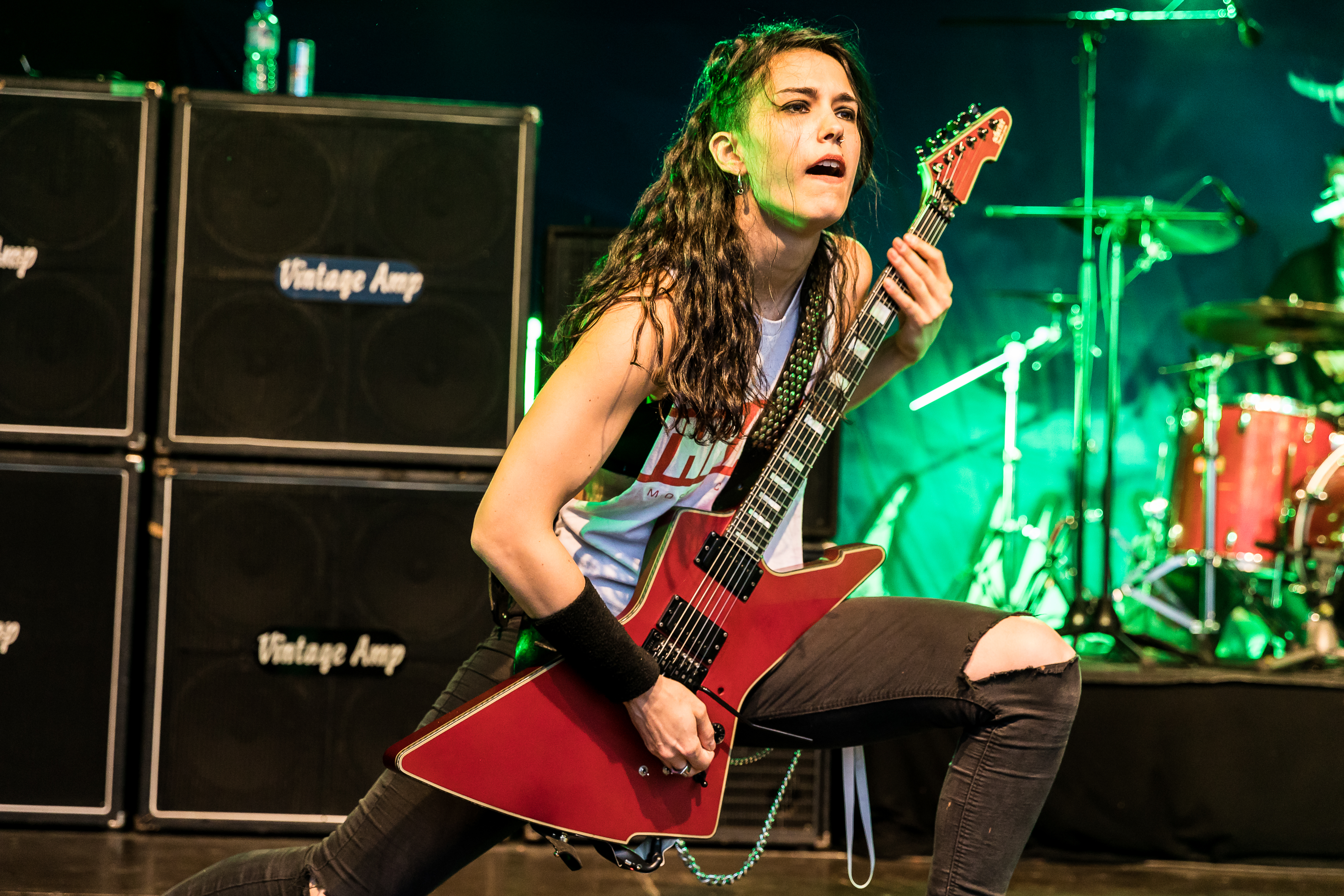
Guitarist Helena Kotina

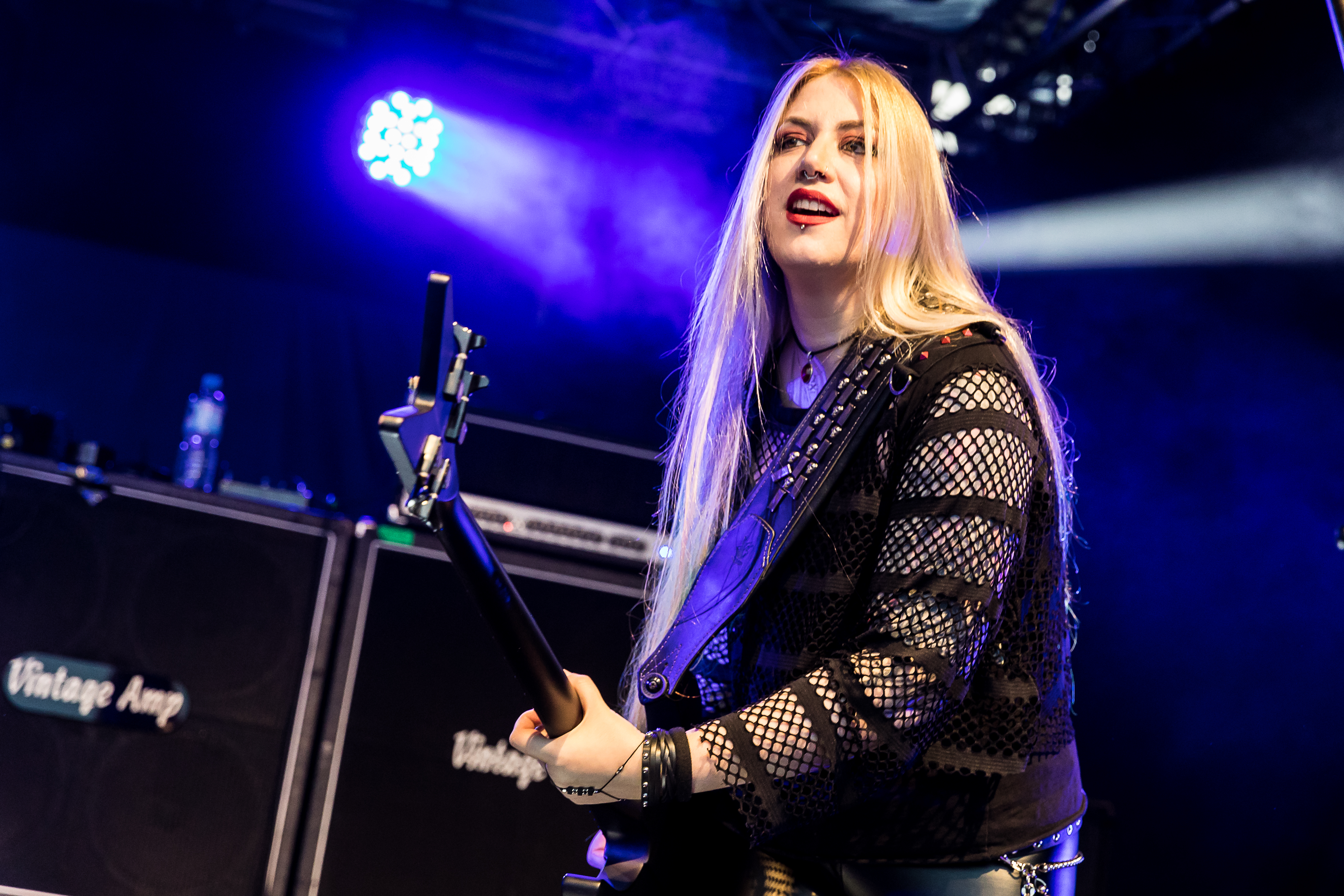
Bassist Hel Pyre

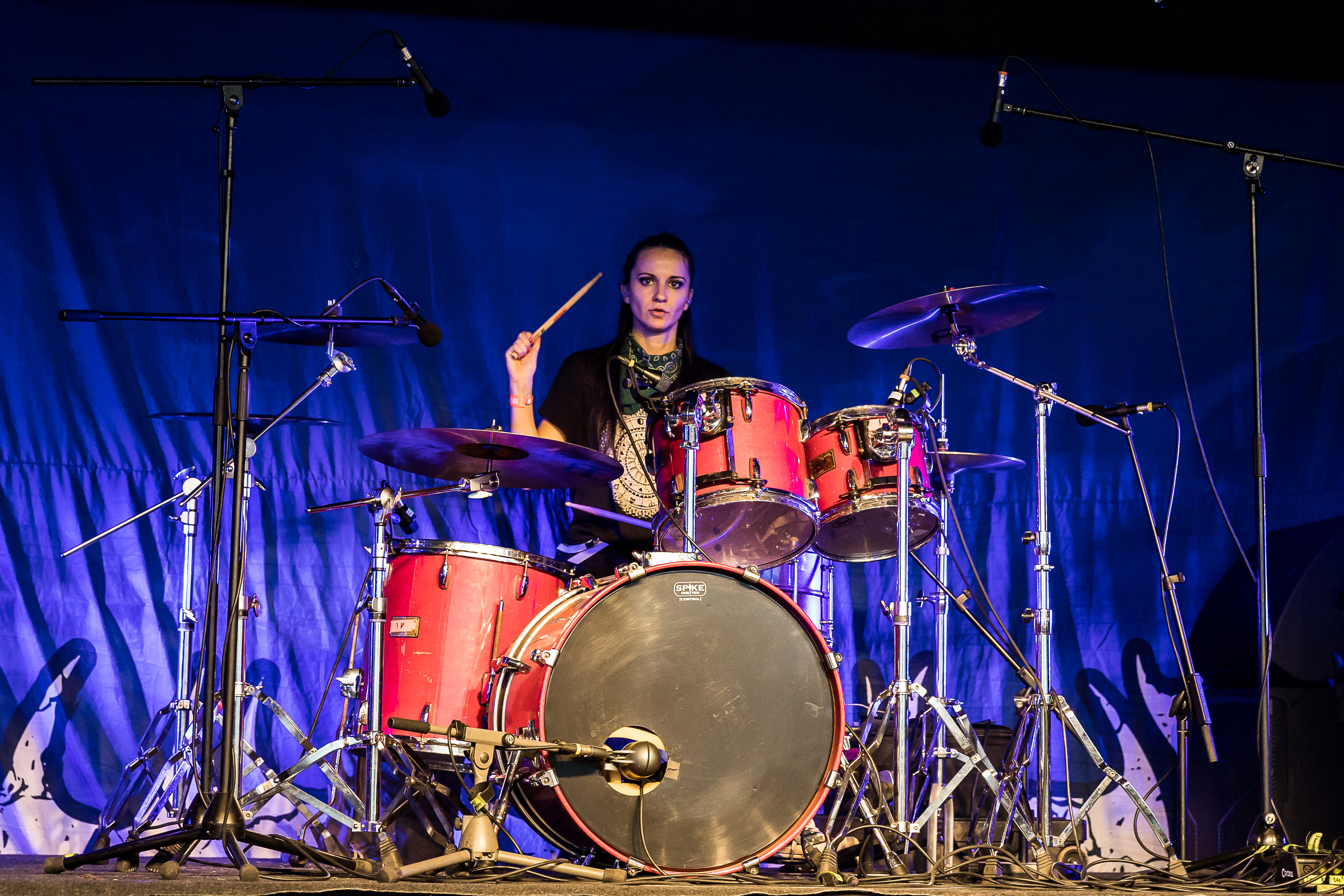
Drummer Michaela Naydenova

=== Current ===
- Prika Amaral – guitars (2010–present), lead vocals (2010–2011, 2023–present), backing vocals (2011–2023)
- Helena Kotina – guitars (2021–present), bass (live guest, 2022)
- Hel Pyre – bass (2023–present)
- Michaela Naydenova – drums (2023–2024, 2026–present; live guest 2024–2025)
- Emmelie Herwegh – bass (2025–present), (live guest 2023-2025)

=== Former ===
- Fernanda Terra – drums (2010–2012)
- Karen Ramos – guitars (2010–2011)
- Fernanda Lira – bass, lead vocals (2010–2020)
- Jully Lee – drums (2012)
- Pitchu Ferraz – drums (2013–2016)
- Luana Dametto – drums (2016–2020)
- Eleni Nota – drums (2020–2022)
- Diva Satánica (Rocio Vázquez) – lead vocals (2020–2022)
- Mia Wallace – bass (2020–2023; live guest 2024)
- Nanu Villalba – drums (2022)
- Gabriela Abud – drums (2024–2026)

=== Live ===
- Amílcar Christófaro – drums (2012, 2014)
- Samantha Landa – drums (2016)
- Aira Deathstorm – drums (2016)
- Simone van Straten – guitars (2017)
- Tiziana Cotella - drums (2024)
- Camilla Rodrigues – bass (2024)
- Natalie Nova – bass (2024)

== Discography ==
=== Studio albums ===
- Victim of Yourself (2014)
- Agony (2016)
- Downfall of Mankind (2018)
- Perpetual Chaos (2021)
- Jailbreak (2023)
- Slave Machine (2026)

=== Singles ===
- "Freakshow" (2019)
- "Endless Ambition" (2023)
- "Seed of Death" (2023)
- "Jailbreak" (2023)
- "Elements Of Sin" (2023)
- "Smashing Heads" (2025)
- "Slave Machine" (2026)
- "Ghost Notes" (2026)
- "Impending Doom" (2026)
