= Eternal Devastation =

Studio album by Destruction
- Released: 12 July 1986
- Recorded: April 1986
- Studio: Studio Hiltpoltstein
- Genre: Thrash metal
- Length: 35:52
- Label: SPV/Steamhammer
- Producer: Manfred Neuner

Destruction chronology
Infernal Overkill (1985)	Eternal Devastation (1986)	Mad Butcher (1987)

Professional ratings
Review scores
Source	Rating
AllMusic	4.5/5 stars

Eternal Devastation is the second full-length album by German thrash metal band Destruction, released on July 12, 1986.

It showed that the band, while still rooted in the speed metal/proto-black metal-influenced style of material evident on the Sentence of Death EP and Infernal Overkill, had started moving in the direction of a more contemporary thrash metal style. It is considered an essential release in the genre.

This is the last studio album to feature drummer Thomas "Tommy" Sandmann, who left the band later in 1986 and was replaced by Oliver "Olli" Kaiser.

The album was re-released on June 12, 2017.

== Track listing ==
All tracks are written by Destruction.

No.	Title	Length
1.	"Curse the Gods"	6:02
2.	"Confound Games"	4:29
3.	"Life Without Sense"	6:24
4.	"United by Hatred"	5:04
5.	"Eternal Ban"	3:41
6.	"Upcoming Devastation" (instrumental)	4:06
7.	"Confused Mind"	6:06
Total length:		35:52

== Credits ==
Writing, performance and production credits are adapted from the album liner notes.

=== Personnel ===
Destruction

- Marcel Schmier – bass, vocals
- Mike Sifringer – guitars
- Thomas "Tommy" Sandmann – drums

Production

- Manfred Neuner – production, engineering
- Bernd Steinwedel – mastering

Artwork and design

- Sebastian Krüger – cover painting
- Joachim Peters – photography

=== Studios ===
- Studio Hiltpoltstein – recording, mixing
- Studio Nord – mastering
