= Infernal Overkill =

Studio album by Destruction
- Released: 24 May 1985
- Recorded: Caet Studio, Berlin
- Genres: Thrash metal; speed metal
- Length: 39:26
- Label: Steamhammer/SPV
- Producer: Destruction

Destruction chronology
Sentence of Death (1984)	Infernal Overkill (1985)	Eternal Devastation (1986)

Professional ratings
Review scores
Source	Rating
Allmusic	2/5 stars
Rock Hard	8.5/10

Infernal Overkill is the debut studio album by German thrash metal band Destruction, released on May 24, 1985.

The album was re-released on February 23, 2018.

== Track listing ==
All songs written by Destruction (Edition Jumar Music).

No.	Title	Length
1.	"Invincible Force"	4:20
2.	"Death Trap"	5:49
3.	"The Ritual"	5:11
4.	"Tormentor"	5:06
5.	"Bestial Invasion"	4:36
6.	"Thrash Attack" (instrumental)	2:56
7.	"Antichrist"	3:44
8.	"Black Death"	7:39
Total length:		39:26

== Personnel ==
Destruction

- Schmier – bass, vocals
- Mike Sifringer – guitars
- Tommy Sandmann – drums

Production

- Produced by Destruction
- Engineered by Horst Müller
- Mastered by Teldec Press, Berlin
- Udo Linke – cover painting
- Melvin Bernales – band logo
- Odeon Zwo Werbeverlag – back cover design
- Frank Stöver – management
