= Dorsal Atlântica =

Brazilian thrash metal band

- Origin: Rio de Janeiro, Brazil
- Genres: Thrash metal, speed metal, crossover thrash, heavy metal
- Years active: 1981–2001, 2012–present
- Labels: Lunário Perpétuo, Heavy, Flight Nineteen, Wild Rags, Cogumelo, Varda, Encore, Dies Irae
- Website: dorsalatlantica.com.br

Dorsal Atlântica is a Brazilian thrash metal band founded in Rio de Janeiro in 1981. They were pioneers of Brazilian thrash metal, and influenced many other bands, including Sepultura and Korzus.

The band recorded the split Ultimatum with another Rio de Janeiro-based band, Metalmorphose, in 1984. Dorsal Atlântica released a string of studio albums from 1984 to 1998, before breaking up in 2001.

Most their lyrics were written in Portuguese. Some of their work contains two versions (English/Portuguese), and four albums are fully in English.

Dorsal Atlântica was always led by guitarist/vocalist Carlos 'Vândalo' Lopes. From 2001 until 2008 he recorded several albums with the psychedelic/high energy rock band called Mustang and with the Brazilian groove/rock band Usina Le Blond.

== Discography ==
=== Demos ===
- 1st Demo (1982)

=== Studio albums ===
- Ultimatum (split) (1985)
- Antes do Fim (1986)
- Dividir & Conquistar (1988)
- Searching for the Light (1990)
- Musical Guide from Stellium (1992)
- Alea Jacta Est (1994)
- Straight (1996)
- Antes do Fim, Depois do Fim (re-recording of Antes do Fim album) (2005)
- 2012 (2012)
- Imperium (2014)
- Canudos (2017)
- Pandemia(2021)

=== EPs ===
- Cheap Tapes from Divide & Conquer (1988)

=== Live albums ===
- Terrorism Alive (1999)

=== Compilation albums ===
- Ultimatum Outtakes 1982–1985 (2002)
- Pelagodiscus Atlanticus (The Old, The Rare, The New) (2002)
- Depois do Fim (After the End) (2014)
