= Executer =

Brazilian metal band

- Origin: Amparo, São Paulo, Brazil
- Genres: Thrash metal
- Years active: 1985-1991; 2000-present
- Members: Juca; Elias; Paulo; Beba

Executer is a Brazilian thrash metal band. They formed in the mid-1980s in the city of Amparo, close to the metropolis of São Paulo.

The founding line up was Juca on vocals and bass, Paulo and Elias on guitars, and Beba on drums. They recorded two demo tapes, well received on the times of tape trading between bands and zines, and in 1990 they recorded and released their debut studio album, Rotten Authorities. The album's sound was compared to Dark Angel and Whiplash.

Despite being one of the more liked bands of the Brazilian thrash metal scene at the time, they split up soon after the release of Rotten Authorities, since they could not find another drummer after Beba left the band.

During the rest of the 1990s, the band members played in many other bands.

In 2000, the band reformed with the original line up, but with some differences in playing; Juca performed only the vocals and Paulo switched to the bass from guitar. With this line up, they released two more albums, Psychotic Mind in 2002 and Welcome To Your Hell in 2006. Their first album was also re-released. The band played throughout Brazil, opening for famous bands such as Exodus on their latest South American tour.

== Members ==
- Juca - vocals
- Elias - guitars
- Paulo - bass
- Beba - drums

== Discography ==
=== Studio albums ===
- Rotten Authorities (1990)
- Psychotic Mind (2002)
- Welcome to Your Hell (2006)
- Helliday (2014)
