= I.N.R.I. (Sarcófago album) =

Studio album by Sarcófago
- Released: August 1987
- Recorded: July 1987 at J.G. Studio in Belo Horizonte
- Genre: Black metal
- Length: 28:16 (original); 45:28 (reissue)
- Label: Cogumelo
- Producers: Gauguin, Tarso Senra, João Guimarães

Sarcófago chronology
I.N.R.I. (1987)	Rotting (1989)

I.N.R.I – demo tape
- The I.N.R.I. demo tape

Professional ratings
Review scores
Source	Rating
AllMusic	3.5/5 stars
Sputnikmusic	4/5 stars

I.N.R.I. is the debut album by the Brazilian extreme metal band Sarcófago. It was recorded in July and released in August 1987. Originally self-released as a cassette with photocopied covers, it was re-released numerous times, with three different covers: orange (classic), blue and brown skeleton. The 2002 CD re-release by Cogumelo Records has 15 tracks.

== Musical style ==
Since their inception, Sarcófago's aim was to make the most aggressive music ever. Early musical blueprints included extreme metal stalwarts Celtic Frost, Bathory and Slayer, along with Finnish hardcore punk bands like Terveet Kädet and Rattus. The extensive use of blast beats on this album by drummer Eduardo "D.D. Crazy" made him a pioneer in the metal world. I.N.R.I.'s release has been considered a milestone in the evolution of black metal, although band bassist Geraldo "Incubus" Minelli continues to consider Sarcófago, to this date, a death metal band.

== Legacy ==
I.N.R.I. influenced black metal circles worldwide, particularly the Scandinavian portion of the so-called "second wave" of the genre. "It is sobering," claimed Terrorizer magazine, "to think of what wouldn't have happened had 'I.N.R.I.' not been released."

Fenriz of Darkthrone included a Sarcófago track ("Satanic Lust") in his The Best of Old-School Black Metal compilation released by Peaceville Records. Of Sarcófago's I.N.R.I., he said it was an "album" that "you buy or die." Euronymous, the deceased guitarist of Mayhem and erstwhile leader of the so-called "Inner Circle", traded correspondence with Lamounier in the early days of Norway's scene. According to the Lords of Chaos book, Euronymous was "obsessed" with Sarcófago's early image, and wanted all black metal bands to be modelled after it. Satyricon covered Sarcófago's "I.N.R.I." on their Intermezzo II EP, also featured on the Tribute to Sarcófago album, released by Cogumelo Records in 2001.

Notable black metal groups from neighbouring Finland were also affected by Sarcófago's early output. Mika Luttinen from Impaled Nazarene said that "nothing tops Slayer's Reign in Blood or Sarcófago's I.N.R.I., you know." Their version of "The Black Vomit" was included in Tribute to Sarcófago.

In 2009, IGN included I.N.R.I. in their "10 Great Black Metal Albums" list. In 2013, Decibel ranked it at number 22 on its list of the Top 100 Black Metal Albums of All Time.

== Track listing ==
All tracks written by Wagner Lamounier (lyrics) and Sarcófago (music).

No.	Title	Length
1.	"Satanic Lust"	3:10
2.	"Desecration of Virgin"	1:59
3.	"Nightmare"	5:38
4.	"I.N.R.I."	2:07
5.	"Christ's Death"	3:37
6.	"Satanas"	2:05
7.	"Ready to Fuck"	3:27
8.	"Deathrash"	1:36
9.	"The Last Slaughter"	4:37

=== Re-release bonus tracks ===
No.	Title	Length
10.	"Recrucify"	2:29
11.	"The Black Vomit"	2:23
12.	"Satanas"	2:02
13.	"Nightmare (Live)"	6:05
14.	"The Black Vomit (Live)"	2:22
15.	"Satanas (Live)"	2:03

Tracks 10–12 were taken from the Warfare Noise split album with Chakal, Holocausto and Mutilator, while tracks 13–15 are live from a tour in Argentina. The backcover says that the album has 14 tracks, number 10 being "Recrucify / The Black Vomit", but in fact it has 15.

== Personnel ==
- Wagner "Antichrist" Lamounier − vocals
- Zéder "Butcher" Patrocinio − guitar
- Geraldo "Incubus" Minelli − bass
- Eduardo "D.D. Crazy" Patrocinio − drums, percussion

== Bibliography ==
- "Black Metal Foundations Top 20: The First Wave". Terrorizer. 128: 42–43. 2005.
- Filho, Fernando Souza (1992). "Sarcófago: Cada Dia Mais Sujo e Agressivo". Rock Brigade. 67: 42–44.
- Franzin, Ricardo (1997). "Sarcófago: A 'Pior' Banda do Mundo Fala Tudo". Rock Brigade. 130: 16–18.
- Moynihan, Michael; Søderlind, Didrik (2003). Lords of Chaos: The Bloody Rise of the Satanic Metal Underground. Los Angeles: Feral House. ISBN 0-922915-94-6.
- Nemitz, Cézar (1994). "Sarcófago: O Tormento Continua...". Dynamite. 13: 58–59.
- Gabriel, Ricardo (2008). "Sarcófago: Tributo à Banda Mais Polêmica do Brasil". Roadie Crew. 114: 54–56.
- Schwarz, Paul; Strachan, Guy (2005). "The Boys from the Black Stuff: A Brief History of Black Metal". Terrorizer. 128: 35–37.
