= Blast beat =

Type of drum beat

Hammer Blast beat drum pattern

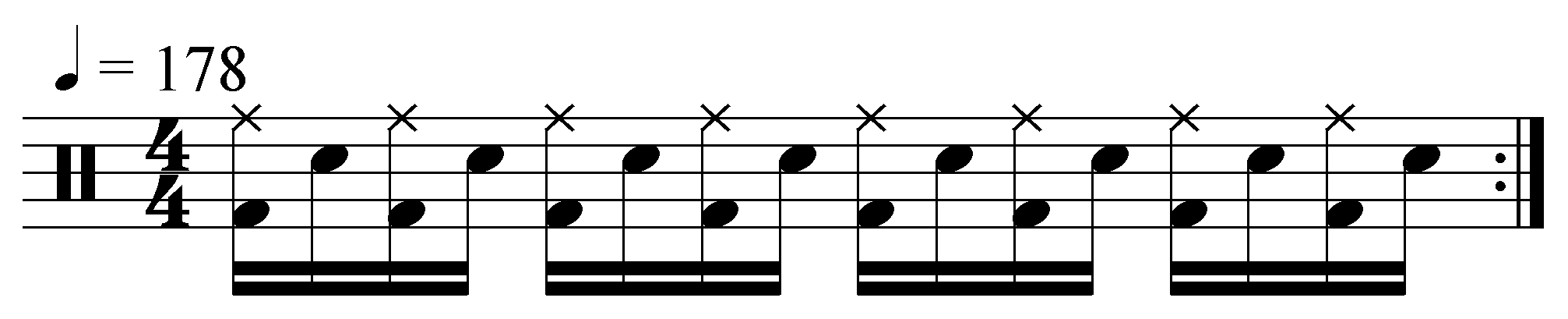
The most common and simple blast beat pattern is found in "Scum" by Napalm Death in 1987 at 1:18

A blast beat is a type of drum beat that originated in hardcore punk and grindcore, and is often associated with certain styles of extreme metal, namely black metal, death metal and their respective subgenres, and occasionally in metalcore. In Adam MacGregor's definition, "the blast-beat generally comprises a repeated, sixteenth-note figure played at a very fast tempo, and divided uniformly among the bass drum, snare, and ride, crash, or hi-hat cymbal." Blast beats have been described by PopMatters contributor Whitney Strub as, "maniacal percussive explosions, less about rhythm per se than sheer sonic violence". According to Brad Schlueter of Drum!,

"The 'original' or traditional blastbeat is a single-stroke roll played between your cymbal and snare, with your kick playing simultaneously with every cymbal hit."

Napalm Death is credited with coining the term, though this style of drumming had previously been used by others for its characteristically chaotic sound.

== History ==
=== Antecedents in jazz and rock ===
Although most commonly associated with hardcore punk and extreme metal, the earliest forms of what would later become the blast beat are noted to have appeared in jazz music. A commonly cited early example that somewhat resembles the modern technique is a brief section of Sam Woodyard's drum solo during a 1962 rendition of "Kinda Dukish" with the Duke Ellington orchestra. A clip of the performance under the title "The first blast beat in the world" garnered almost one million views on YouTube. Woodyard's example, however, lacks the modern inclusion of kick drum and cymbal work into the beat. Another early instance can be heard in Sunny Murray's 1966 or '67 performance on a live recording "Holy Ghost" with saxophonist Albert Ayler, although this did not receive an official release until the 1998 reissue of Albert Ayler in Greenwich Village. Prior to these two examples resurfacing and receiving the attention in the 2010s, AllMusic contributor Thom Jurek credited Tony Williams as the "true inventor of the blastbeat" for his frenetic performance on "Dark Prince" for Trio of Doom in 1979, officially released only in 2007.

Some early antecedents of blast beats have also been identified in rock music. An early example of a proto-blast beat can be found in the Tielman Brothers' 1959 single, "Rock Little Baby of Mine" during the instrumental break. Drummer Steve Ross of the band Coven also plays an "attempt" at a blast beat in the track "Dignitaries of Hell" off the group's 1969 album, Witchcraft Destroys Minds & Reaps Souls.

Four early examples of blast beats were performed in 1970: King Crimson's "The Devil's Triangle" off their sophomore release In the Wake of Poseidon includes proto-blastbeats in the later half of the song; Mike Fouracre of Marsupilami performs many blast beats throughout their self-titled album, most notably on "And the Eagle Chased the Dove to Its Ruin"; Emerson, Lake & Palmer's track "The Barbarian" contains a very brief blast beat in the outro; Bill Ward, drummer of pioneering heavy metal band Black Sabbath, played a few blast beats on a live performance of their song "War Pigs" (e.g. at timestamps 3:52 and 6:38).

=== Modern hardcore and metal blast beats ===
The blast beat as it is known today originated in the hardcore punk and grindcore scenes of the 1980s. Contrary to popular belief, blast beats originated from punk and hardcore music, not metal music. In the UK punk and hardcore scene of the early 1980s there were many bands attempting to play as fast as possible. English band Napalm Death coined the term "blast beat", specifically drummer Mick Harris, although this style of drumming had previously been practiced by others. Daniel Ekeroth argues that the [hardcore] blast beat was first performed by the Swedish group Asocial on their 1982 demo. Other early examples include D.R.I. (1983, "No Sense"), Beastie Boys (1982, track 5, "Riot Fight"), Sepultura (1985, track 11, "Antichrist"), S.O.D. (1985, track 11, "Milk"), Sarcófago (1986, track 10, "Satanas"), and Repulsion also included the technique prior to Napalm Death's emergence. Rockdetector contributor Garry Sharpe-Young credits D.R.I.'s Eric Brecht as the first on their 1983 debut but credits Napalm Death with making it better known.

In 1985, Napalm Death, then an emerging grindcore band, replaced their former drummer Miles "Rat" Ratledge with Mick Harris, who brought to the band a whole new level of speed. Harris is credited with developing the term "blast beat", describing the fast notes played on the kick and snare. Harris started using the blast beat as a fundamental aspect of Napalm Death's early musical compositions. It was finally with Napalm Death's first full-length album Scum (1987) that the blast beat started to evolve into a distinct musical expression of its own. Blast beats became popular in extreme music from the mid to late 1980s . The blast beat evolved into its modern form as it was developed in the American death metal and grindcore scene of the late 1980s and early 1990s. Pete Sandoval, drummer of Terrorizer (1986–1989) and later Morbid Angel (1984–2013), purportedly was the first to use blast beats in metronomic time (and not as arhythmic or non-metric white noise) and thus gave it a more useful musical characteristic for timekeeping.

Blast beats eventually appeared in commercially successful metal music, beginning with Fear Factory's album Demanufacture (1995) and Slipknot's album Iowa (2001).

== Characteristics ==
Traditional blast beat drum pattern

A blast beat is traditionally played as an alternating single-stroke roll broken up between the kick drum and the snare drum. Blast beats are counted in 32nd or 16th notes. In a modern musical context blast beats are usually regarded as such when played at a minimum of above 90 beats per minute 32nd notes, or 180 bpm 16th notes. Early blast beats were generally quite slow and less precise compared to today's standards. Nowadays, a blast beat is normally played as 16th notes at from 180 bpm to potentially as high as 280 bpm, although an upper limit of 250 bpm is more common. There is also the "gravity blast", not to be confused with the one-handed gravity roll. This technique uses the rim of the snare drum as a fulcrum, allowing two snare hits with one downward motion (essentially doing the work of two hands with only one).

Typical blast beats consist of 8th-note patterns between both the bass and snare drum alternately, with the hi-hat or the ride synced. Variations exist such as displacing hi-hat/ride, snare and bass drum hits and/or using other cymbals such as splashes, crashes, chinas and even tambourines for accenting, for example when using odd time or playing progressively. While playing 8th or 8th note triplets some drummers choose to play in sync with one foot while others split the 8th notes between both feet. In blast beats in general, the notes on the kick drum can be played either with one foot only or by alternating both feet, referred to as a "two-foot" or "economy" blast.

=== Variations ===
As blast beats have evolved, different types and interpretations have emerged. There are four main variations of the blast beat: the traditional blast, the bomb blast, the hammer blast and the freehand blast.

The traditional blast beat is a single-stroke roll alternating between the snare drum and kick drum. The ride hand is usually playing in unison with the kick drum. The traditional blast beat is structurally very similar to the skank beat, which can be regarded as a predecessor and a half time variation of the traditional blast beat. The skank beat originated in the early punk and thrash metal scene as a drum beat for extreme music. The skank beat is similar to the blast beat as it alternates between the kick and the snare, with the difference that the ride hand plays notes in unison with both kick and snare. A skank beat is in other words a sped up 2/4 rock or polka beat. In the US the skank beat was early on also referred to as the "Slayer" or "thrash" beat due to its popularity among thrash metal bands such as Slayer.

The bomb blast is essentially a combination of blast beat and double bass drumming. When measured in 16th notes a bomb blast consists of 8th notes on the snare played above a 16th notes kick drum line. Most drummers play this beat by leading with the snare, while the traditional blast beat is usually led with the kick. The bomb blast became popular among 1990s death metal bands such as Cannibal Corpse, which is why the bomb blast is also referred to as the "Cannibal" blast.

The hammer blast is played with the kick and snare in unison. Instead of playing 8th notes kick and snare in alternation and thus creating a 16th notes roll, the hammer blast is played as a straight 8th notes roll on the kick and snare simultaneously. The advantage of the hammer blast is that only one fast hand is needed, which usually is the drummer's leading hand (right for right-handed and left for left-handed). If the weaker hand can't keep up with the 8th notes snare line, it can play quarter notes. The kick drum line can be played with one foot as well as a two-footed economy blast. When played at an extremely fast tempo, the hammer blast can be referred to as a "hyper blast". The hammer blast became popular in death metal music of the early 1990s.

The freehand blast, also known as the gravity blast, utilizes the gravity roll technique in a blast beat context. Of all the main blast beat variations, this one is the most recent to have emerged. The snare line is played as a 16th notes single stroke roll, also known as a gravity roll or single handed roll. The roll is played with an up and down motion in which you push and pull the drumstick on and off the snare drum. By using the snare rim as a fulcrum you create a stroke each time you push and pull the drumstick up and down. In this way, the player can double the output of notes to match the amount of notes produced by two feet on the bass drum. It usually presents similarly to a unison hammer blast, but at double the tempo of what would be possible with normal techniques. One drawback is that this blast has a limited volume. The concept behind the gravity roll is not new, but is noted for being brought into modern music by drummer Johhny Rabb. Rabb has published the book The Official Freehand Technique, which covers the gravity roll technique. The term "gravity roll" or "gravity blast," while common and accepted usage, is less correct than "freehand roll" or "fulcrum roll" in that the technique does not rely on gravity and can be played sideways, inverted, or in a zero gravity environment. A combination of the gravity blast and the bomb blast (i.e. both the kick and the snare is playing 16th notes in unison) is called a gravity bomb.

== Examples ==
Examples of the four main blast beat variations in drum tab:

 C- x-x-x-x-x-x-x-x-|   C- x-x-x-x-x-x-x-x-|   C- x-x-x-x-x-x-x-x-|   C- x-x-x-x-x-x-x-x-|
 S- o-o-o-o-o-o-o-o-|   S- -o-o-o-o-o-o-o-o|   S- o-o-o-o-o-o-o-o-|   S- oooooooooooooooo|
 B- o-o-o-o-o-o-o-o-|   B- o-o-o-o-o-o-o-o-|   B- oooooooooooooooo|   B- o-o-o-o-o-o-o-o-|

The first example is a hammer blast. The second example shows a traditional blast beat - essentially a skank beat played at a high tempo (this particular one leads with the bass drum, but the snare can lead as well). Example #3 shows a blast beat with double bass, known as a bomb blast. Example #4 illustrates a freehand blast, also known as a gravity blast and is the only one that showcases the proper speed of a modern blast beat.

Listen to Example 1

Listen to Example 2

Listen to Example 3

Listen to Example 4

== Reception ==
The blast beat has drawn criticism from some musicians in the heavy metal community due to what they perceive as a lack of "groove" associated with the technique, as well as the inaccessibility of its sound to listeners who are not musicians.

Vinnie Paul, drummer of the American heavy metal band Pantera, delineated to Blabbermouth, "It's drummers playing for drummers [...] There's no melody, there's no song and there's no chorus. It just doesn't take you anywhere [...] I just can't groove to that beat."

== See also ==
- Freehand roll
