= MX (band) =

Brazilian thrash metal band

- Origin: São Paulo, Brazil
- Genres: Thrash metal, groove metal
- Years active: 1983–1991; 1997–2000; 2005–present
- Label: Marquee Records
- Members: Alexandre Prado Favoretto "Morto"; Alexandre da Cunha; Décio Frignani; Alexandre Gonsalves "Dumbo"
- Past members: Beraldo; Chico Comelli; Eduardo; Yuri Konopinsk; Alexandre G. C.M.

MX is a Brazilian thrash metal band formed in São Paulo in the early 1980s. Its name comes from the American ICBM MX missile. Mx was one of the most important bands from the Brazilian thrash metal scene during the late 1980s. The band's sound is closer to the Bay Area thrash scene than the Brazilian scene, although many of the vocals were death metal grunts. However, some of its later work was fitting as post-thrash.

First known as LGM118, the band was named after Peacekeeper, Missile Experimental, so the name MX. Later, they were also known as Madre Xama, which means 'Mother of Black Magic' in Portuguese.

MX was the opening act in Brazil for Testament in 1989 and Exodus in 1997.

The band released two studio albums during its heyday, Simoniacal in 1988 and Mental Slavery in 1990, on the defunct label Fucker.

Shortly after the release of Mental Slavery, the band split up, but reformed in 1997, releasing the EP Again in that year and the album Last File in 1999. The band split up again shortly after.

The band reformed for a second time in 2005, and released two new studio albums. Their first two albums have been re-released under the Marquee Records label.

== Band members ==
=== Current lineup ===
Alexandre Prado Favoretto "Morto" – vocals, bass guitar
Décio Frignani – guitars
Alexandre da Cunha – drums, vocals
Alexandre Gonsalves "Dumbo" – vocals, guitar

=== Former band members ===
Beraldo – vocals
Chico Comelli – bass guitar
Eduardo – bass guitar
Yuri Konopinsk – bass guitar
Alexandre G. - bass guitar
C.M. - guitars

== Discography ==
=== Studio albums ===
- Simoniacal – 1988
- Mental Slavery – 1990
- Last File – 1999
- Re-Lapse – 2014
- A Circus Called Brazil – 2018

=== EPs ===
- Again – 1997

=== Other appearances and releases ===
- Headthrashers Live – 1987 (live compilation)
