= The Laws of Scourge =

Studio album by Sarcófago
- Released: August 1991
- Recorded: 1991
- Studio: J.G. (Belo Horizonte)
- Genre: Death metal; thrash metal
- Length: 31:44
- Label: Cogumelo; Music for Nations
- Producer: Sarcófago

Sarcófago chronology
Rotting (1989)	The Laws of Scourge (1991)	Crush, Kill, Destroy (1992)

Professional ratings
Review scores
Source	Rating
AllMusic	4.5/5 stars

The Laws of Scourge is the second studio album by the Brazilian extreme metal band Sarcófago. It was on this album that the band's lyrical content shifted from Satanism to more realistic subject matter; "Midnight Queen" is about a prostitute, while "Screeches from the Silence" is about living life in a care-free manner. After the lo-fi black/thrash metal style of I.N.R.I., The Laws of Scourge marks a change in musical style, with the band playing clearer and more proficient death/thrash metal. This was also the last full-length record to feature a human drummer, as from Hate onwards, the band would use a drum machine.

== Track listing ==
No.	Title	Length
1.	"The Laws of Scourge"	3:29
2.	"Piercings"	5:00
3.	"Midnight Queen"	6:19
4.	"Screeches from the Silence"	3:51
5.	"Prelude to a Suicide"	3:56
6.	"The Black Vomit"	2:26
7.	"Secrets of a Widow"	6:43

CD version bonus tracks
No.	Title	Length
8.	"Little Julie"	4:41
9.	"Crush, Kill, Destroy"	5:30

== Credits ==
=== Sarcófago ===
- Wagner Lamounier – lead vocals, rhythm guitar
- Fábio Jhasko – lead guitar
- Gerald Minelli – backing vocals, acoustic guitar, bass guitar
- Lucio Oliver – drums, percussion

=== Additional musicians ===
- Eugênio "Dead Zone" – keyboards
- Claudio David – backing vocals (on "Midnight Queen", "Screeches from the Silence" and "Crush, Kill, Destroy")

== Production ==
- Arranged and produced by Sarcófago
- Recorded and mixed by Gauguin and Sarcófago
