= Fenriz Presents... The Best of Old-School Black Metal =

Compilation album by Fenriz
- Released: September 20, 2004
- Recorded: Compiled between 2003–04
- Genre: Black metal; thrash metal; death metal; speed metal
- Length: 71:56
- Label: Peaceville Records
- Producer: Fenriz

Professional ratings
Review scores
Source	Rating
AllMusic	2/5 stars

Fenriz Presents… The Best of Old-School Black Metal is a compilation album by Darkthrone drummer Fenriz featuring bands that have been highly influential for, and pioneers of the black metal genre; Nattefrost and Aura Noir being the only newer bands. He originally also wanted the compilation to include Possessed, but Larry LaLonde refused.

== Track listing ==
1. Blasphemy – "Winds of the Black Gods" (written by Caller of the Storms, Nocturnal Grave Descrator and Black Winds and Black Priest of the 7 Satanic Blood Rituals) 1:21
2. Sarcófago – "Satanic Lust" (written by Sarcófago) 3:08
3. Celtic Frost – "Dawn of Megiddo" (written by Martin Stricker and Thomas Gabriel Fischer) 5:44
4. Nattefrost – "Sluts of Hell" (written by Nattefrost) 3:10
5. Mercyful Fate – "Evil" (written by King Diamond and Hank Shermann) 4:46
6. Sodom – "Burst Command ’Til War" (written by Wolfgang Eichholz) 3:22
7. Tormentor – "Elizabeth Bathory" (written by Tormentor) 5:19
8. Aura Noir – "Blood Unity" (written by Aura Noir) 4:49
9. Destruction – "Curse the Gods" (written by Destruction) 5:59
10. Samael – "Into the Pentagram" (written by Vorph and Xy) 6:47
11. Bulldozer – "Whisky Time" (written by Andy Panigada and Alberto Contini) 4:11
12. Mayhem – "Freezing Moon" (written by Mayhem) 6:14
13. Hellhammer – "The Third of the Storms" (written by Tom Fischer) 2:55
14. Burzum – "Ea, Lord of the Deeps" (written by Varg Vikernes) 4:51
15. Venom – "Warhead" (written by Venom) 3:38
16. Bathory – "Dies Irae" (written by Quorthon) 5:14
