= Sisters of Suffocation =

Dutch death metal band

- Origin: Eindhoven, Netherlands
- Genres: Death metal
- Years active: 2014–present
- Labels: Napalm Records
- Members: Els Prins; Simone van Straten; Emmelie Herwegh; Tim Schellekens; Fons van Dijk
- Past members: Puck Wildschut; Marjolein van den Nieuwenhuizen; Kevin van den Heiligenberg; Amber de Buijzer
- Website: facebook.com/sistersofsuffocation

Sisters of Suffocation is a death metal band, hailing from Eindhoven, Netherlands. The band was founded in 2014.

== Biography ==
In April 2016, the band released a first single: Boundaries. The first EP Brutal Queen from 2016 was released independently. In September 2016, the EP was reissued by Hammerheart Records. The first album was released in 2017 on Suburban Records.

The band has performed at several festivals, including: Eindhoven Metal Meeting (NL), Stonehenge Festival (NL), Antwerp Metal Fest (Belgium), Gäfle Metal Fest (Sweden), Zwarte Cross (NL) and Lowlands (NL).

== Band members ==
Current line-up

- Els Prins - vocals
- Linn Liv - vocals
- Simone van Straten - lead guitar
- Emmelie Herwegh - rhythm guitar
- Tim Schellekens - bass
- Fons van Dijk - drums

Previous members

- Puck Wildschut - bass
- Marjolein van den Nieuwenhuizen - bass
- Kevin van den Heiligenberg - drums
- Amber de Buijzer - drums

Live members

- Linn Liv - vocals (2022– )
- Monica Janssen - vocals (2022– )

== Discography ==
Singles & EP's

- Boundaries (2014) - single
- Brutal Queen (2016) - EP, Hammerheart Records
- Shapeshifter (2017) - single
- I Swear (2018) - single

Studio albums

- Anthology of Curiosities (2017) - Suburban Records
- Humans Are Broken (2019)
- Eradication (2022)
