= Sarcófago =

Brazilian extreme metal band

Background information
- Origin: Belo Horizonte, Brazil
- Genres: Thrash metal; death metal; black metal
- Years active: 1985–2000
- Labels: Cogumelo; Music for Nations; Pavement; Relapse
- Members: Wagner "Antichrist" Lamounier; Gerald "Incubus" Minelli; Eugênio "Dead Zone"
- Past members: Zéder "Butcher" Patrocinio; Fabio "Jhasko"; Armando "Leprous" Sampaio; Eduardo "D.D. Crazy" Patrocinio; Manoel "Joker"; Lucio Olliver; Vanir Jr.; Juninho "Pussy Fucker"; Roberto "UFO"

Sarcófago was a Brazilian extreme metal band formed in 1985. They were fronted by Sepultura's original singer, Wagner Lamounier, and Geraldo Minelli.

The cover art of the band's debut album, I.N.R.I., is regarded as a great influence on black metal's corpse paint imagery. That record is also considered one of the "first wave" albums that helped shape the genre.

The band broke up in 2000, after releasing the Crust EP. Former members, minus Lamounier, played throughout Brazil in 2006 as Tributo ao Sarcófago (Tribute to Sarcófago). In 2009, rumors of the original I.N.R.I. line-up reuniting for a small, high-profile tour proved false. A reissue of their back catalogue is in the works, a joint effort between Cogumelo Records and American label Greyhaze.

== History ==
=== Early years (1985–1988) ===
Sarcófago (Portuguese for 'sarcophagus') was formed in 1985 in Belo Horizonte, Minas Gerais, Brazil. Indebted to Finnish hardcore punk and early extreme metal groups such as Bathory, Celtic Frost, and Slayer, Sarcófago aimed to create the most aggressive music ever. Wagner Lamounier, who parted acrimoniously from Sepultura in March 1985, was invited to join the band. Although Sepultura never recorded anything with Lamounier, he contributed the lyrics to the song "Antichrist" on their Bestial Devastation EP. Sarcófago's vinyl debut was on the Cogumelo Produções split album Warfare Noise I, released in 1986. Sarcófago contributed the tracks "Recrucify", "The Black Vomit", and "Satanas". Their music and lyrics were considered shocking at the time, which brought them considerable attention. The band's line-up at that point consisted of "Butcher" (guitars), "Antichrist" (Lamounier; vocals), "Incubus" (Geraldo Minelli; bass) and "Leprous" (Armando Sampaio; drums).

With new drummer "D.D. Crazy" —hailed as a metal pioneer for his extensive use of blast beats on this album— Sarcófago released I.N.R.I in July 1987. The band's attire on the cover —corpsepaint, leather jackets, and bullet belts— is considered the first definite statement of black metal's imagery and style. The music has been equally influential in the development of the genre. Despite the record's legendary status, Lamounier was unsatisfied with the end results, complaining about the quality of the recording sessions and the band's inner strife. After the release of I.N.R.I., Sarcófago briefly disbanded. Lamounier moved to Uberlândia to study economics at the Federal University of Uberlândia (UFU), while Butcher and his brother D.D. Crazy left the group. The latter played drums on Sextrash's 1990 debut, Sexual Carnage.

=== Rotting (1989–1990) ===
When Rotting first came out, it stirred controversy due to its cover art — a grim reaper figure licking what appears to be Jesus Christ's face. It was based upon a medieval painting. The cover artist, Kelson Frost, refused to paint a crown of thorns over the man's head, which would have identified him as the Christian messiah.

Rotting differs from the raw, hyper-speed black metal of I.N.R.I. Session drummer "Joker" brought different influences to the band, such as crossover thrash. Lamounier learned to play guitar and contributed many of the album's riffs. Rotting also marked their first change of aliases: the group's core duo renamed themselves "Wagner Antichrist" and "Gerald Incubus". Their image went through changes too. They dropped the arm and leg spikes because they made playing live difficult.

Rotting was Sarcófago's first release to have international distribution, handled in Europe by British label Music for Nations, and by Maze/Kraze in America. Maze Records released a censored version of Rotting, blacking out the original cover and adding a sticker that read "Featuring the Original Lead Singer of Sepultura" without consulting the band. Infuriated, Sarcófago sued the label.

=== The Laws of Scourge (1991–1993) ===
Next came The Laws of Scourge (1991), considered a "revolution" in the band's career. A combination of better musicianship, improved production values, and more sophisticated songwriting landed them into technical death metal territory. Sarcófago's new direction was partly influenced by new members, Fábio "Jhasko" (guitar) and Lúcio Olliver (drums), and inspired by a newer extreme metal bands such as Godflesh, Paradise Lost, Bolt Thrower, Deicide, and Morbid Angel.

The Laws of Scourge became Sarcófago's best selling record, and responsible for their most extensive touring schedule to this date. Their tour included their first international dates: they visited South American countries such as Peru and Chile, and in Europe they played shows in Portugal and Spain. In Brazil, their most important show was to open for Texas crossover thrash band the Dirty Rotten Imbeciles in São Paulo.

=== Hate (1994–1996) ===
Musically, Hate has a stripped-down, straightforward approach uses a drum machine, which sparked some controversy. Lamounier claimed to have no qualms about using this device, on the basis that most death metal drummers use trigger pads for recording purposes, which produces the same homogenized sound as a drum machine.

The band cut their hair short to protest the popularity of the masculine long hair due to the success of grunge in the early 1990s. Men sporting long hair has traditionally been associated with counterculture groups, and it is especially present in the metalhead subculture. Lamounier declared,

Every douchebag around is wearing long hair, Nirvana and Pearl Jam T-shirts, etc. We have nothing against these bands, but we have against jumping the bandwagon. It's not right when it becomes a trend, because massification dumbs people down.

In late 1995, Sarcófago released the Decade of Decay compilation, which featured demo versions of their early songs and rare backstage photographs. The band described the CD as a "gift" to fans.

=== The Worst (1996–2000) ===
Sarcófago's fourth and final album, The Worst (1996), had the band slowing down relative to the speed-oriented Hate, and featured a better grasp of drum programming. Minelli and Lamounier considered this record a "summation" of their career.

The 2000 EP Crust was Sarcófago's final release. It was meant to be a preview of an upcoming album, but the band's core duo parted ways before recording.

=== Sarcófago Tribute tour (2006–2009) ===
To celebrate the 20th anniversary of the Warfare Noise split album, Cogumelo Records and Gerald Incubus organized a comeback show with Sarcófago in Belo Horizonte. Along with Minelli, the line-up for that event was Fábio Jhasko on guitars, Manu Joker, and Juarez "Tibanha" on vocals. That performance was recorded and there were plans to release it on DVD. Lamounier opted out of this "Sarcófago Tribute", lacking desire to play professionally. However, Lamounier still pursues musical interests, playing in the crust punk band Commando Kaos.

In October 2007, Sarcófago flew to Santiago, Chile to play in the Black Shadows Festival, alongside Possessed.

In March 2009, Lamounier supposedly announced a Sarcófago reunion and a tour that would include appearances at the Wacken Open Air and Hole in the Sky festivals, as well as dates in London, New York, Los Angeles and Tokyo. He stated it would be the original I.N.R.I. line-up, but that this would be the only tour they would be doing and there would be no new material. A couple of days later, Lamounier exposed this news report as a hoax.

=== Gerard Minelli & The Laws playing Sarcòfago (2026) ===
In 2026, bassist Gerard Minelli, along with the band The Laws (consisting of Pedro Nicolsky, Igor Podrão, César Pessoa, and Morto) and guest drummer Armando Sampaio, played several concerts in Europe and Latin America as Sarcòfago, where, according to booking agency Killtown Bookings, they primarily performed material from Satanic Lust, Warfare Noise, I.N.R.I., and Rotting.

== Musical style and influences ==
Sarcófago were an extreme metal band, and performed what is now considered thrash metal, death metal and black metal. Inspired by Venom and Hellhammer, Sarcófago's early lyrics were openly Satanic. These lyrics frequently employed curse words and crude, obscene scenarios, such as in the case of "Desecration of (the) Virgin", a blasphemous take on Mother Mary's virgin birth. The band's lyrics included a mixture of Portuguese and English. One of their English lyrics: "If you are a false don't entry", has been described as the catchphrase of cult black metal.

Whilst still polemical, by 1989's Rotting the band's stance on Christianity was more agnostic than Satanic. The original vinyl release came with a lengthy manifesto written by Lamounier, in which he criticized the alienating effect that Catholicism had on Brazilian society. The band also questioned the divine nature of Christ, declaring he was just a regular man who died for his ideas. On a less serious note the album featured "Sex, Drinks and Metal", a hedonistic ode to the headbanger lifestyle.

Their next album, The Laws of Scourge, continued their new-found focus on more "reality-based" themes, with lyrics generally covering such death-related topics as suicide and homicide. The band had trouble again with American censors, with the lyrics of the re-recorded version of "The Black Vomit" being forcibly omitted from the CD booklet as well as the entire "Prelude to Suicide" track.

== Legacy and impact ==
Sacrófago is commonly cited as influence on the emerging black metal genre, particularly among the Scandinavian portion of the so-called "second wave" of the genre. "It is sobering", claimed Terrorizer magazine, "to think of what wouldn't have happened had 'I.N.R.I.' not been released". Eduardio Rivadavia of AllMusic conferred the title of "the most extreme and inaccessible members of the first wave of Brazil's early death metal champions" on Sarcófago. He also noted elements of punk rock present in the band's sound, which according to him, was "at odds" within extreme metal at the time. He was quoted saying: "Though the country's metal scene was understandably small and close-knit at the time, from the very start Sarcófago were committed to doing things differently. [...] Even though this radical approach ultimately didn't spell a recipe for widespread success, it certainly made Sarcófago impossible to ignore."

Fenriz, drummer of Darkthrone, included a Sarcófago track ("Satanic Lust") in his The Best of Old-School Black Metal compilation, released by Peaceville Records. Of Sarcófago's I.N.R.I., he said it was an "album" that "you buy or die". Euronymous, the deceased guitarist of Mayhem and erstwhile leader of the so-called "Inner Circle", traded correspondence with Lamounier in the early days of Norway's scene. In the Lords of Chaos book, Metalion (Slayer fanzine, ex-Head Not Found) stated that Euronymous was "obsessed with them because wore lots of spikes and corpsepaint. He said he wanted every band to be like this […]." Satyricon covered Sarcófago's "I.N.R.I." on their Intermezzo II EP, also featured on the Tribute to Sarcófago album, released by Cogumelo Records in 2001. Key Gorgoroth members Infernus and King were also influenced by Sarcófago.

Notable black metal groups from neighbouring Finland were also affected by Sarcófago's early output. Beherit founder Nuclear Holocausto said Sarcófago was one of "the greatest influences" for the band; Mika Luttinen from Impaled Nazarene said that "nothing tops Slayer's Reign in Blood or Sarcofago's I.N.R.I., you know". Their version of "The Black Vomit" was included in Tribute to Sarcófago.

Lamounier, however, has been critical of several of the bands influenced by Sarcófago, especially bands from the Norwegian black metal scene, wondering how one of the wealthiest countries in the world could have produced such a scene. Although he liked Immortal, Wagner dubbed Euronymous a "nutcase" and considered Burzum "shit". He also criticized black metal's purposely lo-fi recording aesthetic; Lamounier said that Burzum's guitar timbre "sounded like it was recorded through a transistor radio".

They are also considered highly influential on the development of war metal.

=== Rivalry with Sepultura ===
An oft-cited aspect of Sarcófago's history is their long-lasting feud with Sepultura. Although former Sepultura drummer Igor Cavalera eventually dismissed the entire affair as "child's play", the music press fuelled their bitter rivalry for many years. Their conflict partially contributed to Sarcofágo's fame as the perennial "black sheep" of Brazilian heavy metal.

Tensions started after Lamounier parted ways with Sepultura, which led to a temporarily awkward situation. In Minelli's assessment, "everybody had forgotten it" until two years later, when D.D. Crazy smashed a bottle over Andreas Kisser's head, who had been recently recruited as Sepultura's new lead guitarist. Kisser was being "too much of a douchebag". Sílvio "Bibica" Gomes, Sepultura roadie and co-author of the band's Toda a História biography, was one of the prime instigators of that fight.

During an interview from The Worst era, Lamounier was asked to comment on Sepultura's well-publicized break-up, when Max Cavalera left the band in January 1997. Lamounier declared he was not surprised that things turned out the way they did as, in his words, "with what I knew of them, I think it's quite normal that one brother should betray another in that family, they don't measure the consequences to get what they want. So, a brother backstabbing the other, deceiving their mother, cheating a friend... For money, I'll bet they're capable of anything."

Cavelera responded to Lamounier with the song "Bumbklaatt", a track that was included on Soulfly's debut album. The animosity between the two groups eventually reached another major Brazilian band, crossover thrash act Ratos de Porão. The band got involved in the affair after a 1987 Belo Horizonte gig, when a portion of the audience kept jeering at the band. One version of that story states that Lamounier and Ratos de Porão singer João Gordo were antagonizing each other during the show. Another one tells that when Gordo asked Sepultura frontman Max Cavalera who was "gobbing" at his band, Max accused Sarcófago.

Tensions flared up once again five years later when Sarcófago, instead of Ratos de Porão, were picked up to be the opening band of Dirty Rotten Imbeciles' first Brazilian shows. Ratos de Porão and friends from São Paulo thrash metal group Korzus invaded Sarcófago's backstage area; João Gordo then proceeded to sucker-punch Lamounier while he was lying drunk on the floor, and Gordo's friends attacked the rest with motorcycle chains. A massive brawl ensued, with a member of Dirty Rotten Imbeciles' road crew getting his arm broken.

== Members ==
Last known line-up

- Wagner "Antichrist" Lamounier – vocals, guitar (1985–2000)
- Geraldo "Gerald Incubus" Minelli – bass guitar, backing vocals (1986–2000)

Session

- Manoel Henriques "Manu Joker" – drums, backing vocals (1989–1991)
- Vanir Jr. – keyboards (1991–1993)
- Eugênio "Dead Zone" – drum programming, keyboards (1994–2000)

Former

- Armando "Leprous" Sampaio – drums (1985–1986)
- Juninho "Pussy Fucker" – bass guitar (1985–1986)
- Zéder "Butcher" Patrocinio – guitar (1985–1987)
- Eduardo "D.D. Crazy" Patrocinio – drums (1986–1987)
- Fábio Jhasko "Jhasko" – guitar (1991–1993)
- Lucio Olliver – drums (1991–1993)

== Discography ==
Studio albums

- I.N.R.I. (1987)
- The Laws of Scourge (1991)
- Hate (1994)
- The Worst (1997)

Compilation albums

- Decade of Decay (1996)

Demos

- Satanic Lust (1986)
- The Black Vomit (1986)
- Sepultado (1987)
- Christ's Death (1987)
- Die... Hard! (2015) (compilation)

EPs

- Rotting (1989)
- Crush, Kill, Destroy (1992)
- Crust (2000)

Split albums

- Warfare Noise I (1986); with Chakal, Holocausto and Mutilator

Compilation appearances

- The Lost Tapes of Cogumelo (1990)
- Masters of Brutality II (1992)
- Speed Kills 6: Violence of the Slams (1992)
- Roadkill, Vol. 2 (1999)
- Cogumelo Records Compilation (2001)
- Warzone XXVI (2001)
- Fenriz Presents... The Best of Old-School Black Metal (2004)

== Bibliography ==
- Barcinski, André; Gomes, Sílvio (1999). Sepultura: Toda a História. São Paulo: Editora 34. ISBN 978-85-7326-156-1.
- "Black Metal Foundations Top 20: The First Wave". Terrorizer. 128: 42–43. 2005.
- Colmatti, Andréa (1997). "Sepultura: Igor Cavalera". Modern Drummer Brasil. 6: 18–26, 28–30.
- Filho, Fernando Souza (1992). "Sarcófago: Cada Dia Mais Sujo e Agressivo". Rock Brigade. 67: 42–44.
- Franzin, Ricardo (1997). "Sarcófago: A 'Pior' Banda do Mundo Fala Tudo". Rock Brigade. 130: 16–18.
- Gabriel, Ricardo (2008). "Sarcófago: Tributo à Banda Mais Polêmica do Brasil". Roadie Crew. 114: 54–56.
- Gimenez, Karen (1995). "Sarcófago: Quarteto que Virou Dupla". Rock Brigade. 102: 54–55.
- Moynihan, Michael; Søderlind, Didrik (2003). Lords of Chaos: The Bloody Rise of the Satanic Metal Underground. Los Angeles: Feral House. ISBN 0-922915-94-6.
- Nemitz, Cézar (1994). "Sarcófago: O Tormento Continua...". Dynamite. 13: 58–59.
- Schwarz, Paul; Guy Strachan (2005). "The Boys from the Black Stuff: A Brief History of Black Metal". Terrorizer. 128: 35–37.
- Synnott, Anthony (1987). "Shame and Glory: A Sociology of Hair". British Journal of Sociology. 38 (3): 381–413. doi:10.2307/590695. ISSN 0007-1315. JSTOR 590695.
- Weinstein, Geena (2000). Heavy Metal: The Music And Its Culture. Cambridge: Da Capo. ISBN 978-0-306-80970-5.
