= Trigger pad =

The Ellis stomp box sounds like a kick-drum and can be used as a trigger.

A trigger pad is an electronic sensor on a drum that produces a certain sound assigned from a sound module once the head has been struck. This device allows drummers to play at a constant dynamic regardless of the physical force used.

Triggers are also used to add more definition to drum sounds and prevent bleeding between sound sources, making it easier to hear clearly every drum hit without rumble or excessive cymbals. An example is where very rapid bass drum hits become difficult to distinguish or even hear in the presence of a full band.

== Other uses ==
Triggers are used to count and monitor drum hits, usually as a training device (e.g., to see if a drummer misses hits), and to officially monitor tests and competitions of drumming speed.

Mike Portnoy uses an electronic drum pad with a hardwired electronic metronome as what he calls the "secret cowbell", to count off the songs in a way that only his fellow band members and the technicians can hear.

Triggers can send a MIDI to a lighting control console to signal a change in stage displays.
