= Extreme metal =

Any of a number of related heavy metal music subgenres

- Stylistic origins: Heavy metal; hardcore punk (Note: except doom metal)
- Cultural origins: 1980s, United States and Europe
- Derivative forms: Avant-garde metal; beatdown hardcore; crunkcore; dungeon synth; funk metal; gothic metal; groove metal; grunge; hyperpop; neoclassical metal; nu metal; pop screamo; post-metal; power metal; sass; tough guy hardcore

Subgenres
- Black metal (ambient black metal; folk black metal; industrial black metal; National Socialist black metal; post-black metal (blackgaze); psychedelic black metal; raw black metal; symphonic black metal; unblack metal); death metal (brutal death metal (slam death metal); Christian death metal; industrial death metal; melodic death metal; old school death metal; psychedelic death metal; symphonic death metal; technical death metal); doom metal (epic doom; traditional doom); thrash metal (technical thrash metal)

Fusion genres
- Between extreme metal genres: Black-doom (depressive suicidal black metal); blackened death-doom; blackened death metal (melodic black-death; war metal); blackened thrash metal; death-doom (funeral doom); deathrash; With punk rock: Crossover thrash; crust punk (blackened crust; Red and Anarchist black metal; crack rock steady; crustcore; neo crust); grindcore (blackened grindcore; deathgrind; electrogrind; goregrind (gorenoise; pornogrind); noisegrind); metalcore (deathcore; easycore; electronicore; mathcore; melodic metalcore; Nintendocore; nu metalcore; progressive metalcore; risecore); sludge metal (sludgecore); With other rock styles: Black 'n' roll; death 'n' roll; dream thrash; gothic-doom; progressive doom; stoner metal (desert rock); With other musical styles: Drone metal; pagan metal; Viking metal

Regional scenes
- Australia; Brazil; Finland; Florida; France; Germany; Indonesia; Japan; Norway; Netherlands; Poland; Sweden; United Kingdom; United States

Local scenes
- Birmingham; New York City; San Francisco Bay Area

Other topics
- Growling; heavy metal genres; moshing; NWOBHM; screaming; first-wave black metal

Extreme metal is a loosely defined umbrella term for a number of related heavy metal music subgenres that have developed since the early 1980s. It has been defined as a "cluster of metal subgenres characterized by sonic, verbal, and visual transgression", and refers to metal that is harsher, heavier, more aggressive and less commercialized than other subgenres. Extreme metal is generally underground music that values authenticity and strives to remain outside the mainstream. The term usually includes thrash metal, death metal, black metal and doom metal. Some definitions do not recognise doom metal, or consider that only some of its subgenres are extreme. Most extreme metal styles have very fast tempos and originally took inspiration from hardcore punk.

== Definitions ==
"Extreme metal" generally refers to heavy metal that is extreme in terms of its sound, instrumentation, vocals, lyrics, and imagery. Extreme metal usually has heavily distorted guitars, harsh vocals (such as shouting, screaming and death growls), and complex drumming (such as double bass drumming and blast beats). Most extreme metal styles have very fast tempos (usually between 150 and 250 beats per minute). The exception is doom metal, which instead often takes heaviness and slowness to extremes. Most extreme metal eschews conventional melody and verse-chorus-verse song structure. It also tends to omit the blues element of traditional heavy metal. Joel McIver wrote that extreme metal tends to be faster, harsher, heavier or more aggressive than traditional heavy metal.

Extreme metal's lyrics and imagery typically deal with dark themes such as death, killing, war, horror and the occult. They are often anti-Christian and may include references to Satanism or Paganism. A small number of extreme metal bands reference Nazi Germany, for example Slayer and Marduk.

According to ethnographer Keith Kahn-Harris, the defining characteristics of extreme metal are clearly transgressive: the "extreme" traits noted above are all meant to violate or transgress cultural, artistic, social or aesthetic boundaries. Kahn-Harris says that extreme metal can sometimes sound "close to being a formless noise" to the uninitiated listener.

In general, extreme metal strives to remain inaccessible and unpalatable to 'mainstream' audiences. It is largely based around independent record labels and grassroots promotion. In most of the world, extreme metal does not receive much radio-play or achieve high chart positions.

== Early history ==
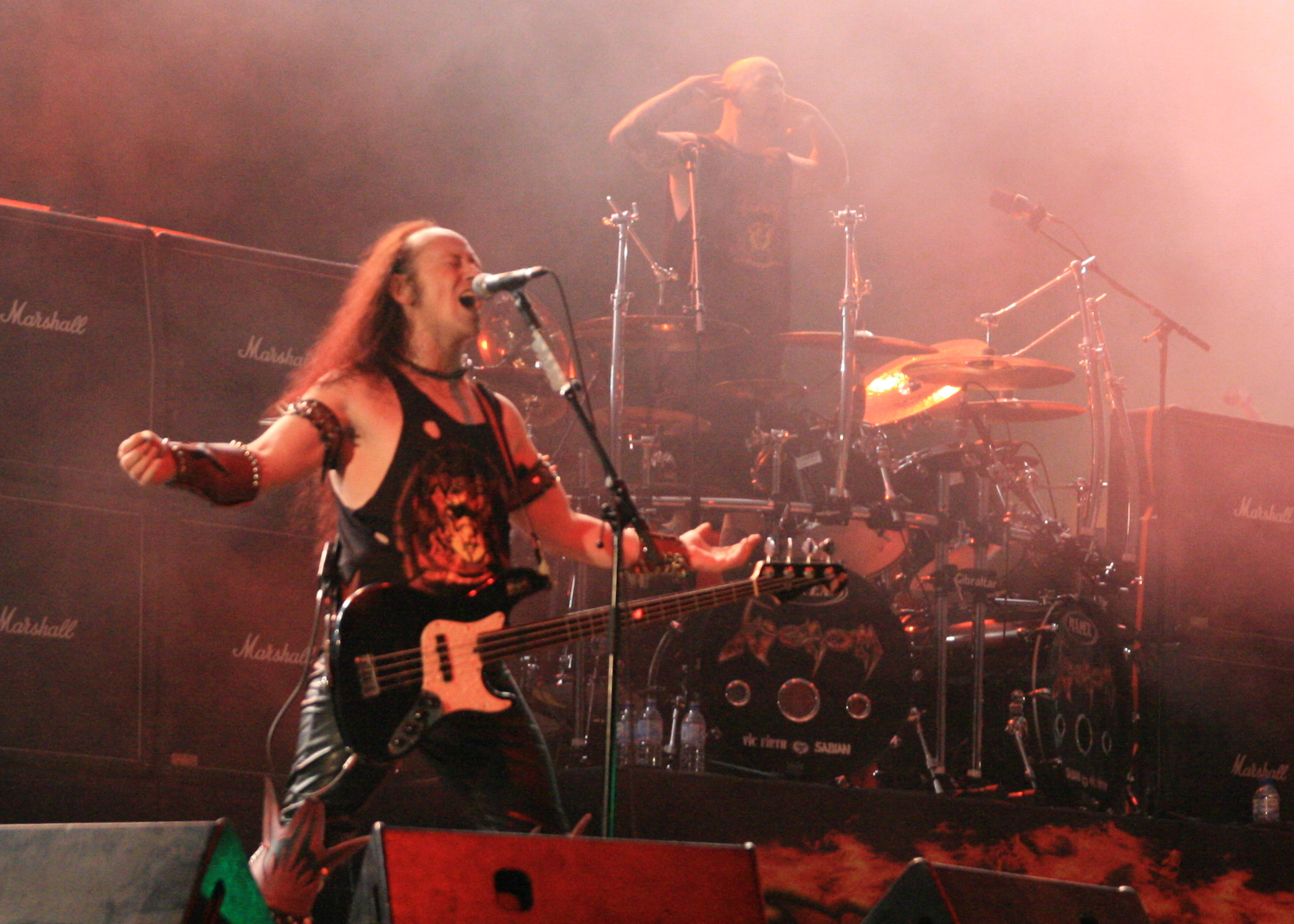
Venom in 2008

The English band Venom laid the foundations of extreme metal with their first two albums Welcome to Hell (1981) and Black Metal (1982). Part of the new wave of British heavy metal, they played a sped-up and stripped-down style, and used Satanic and occult imagery. Venom and early extreme metal bands were influenced by the speed, distortion and aggression of hardcore punk bands like Discharge, the Exploited and Amebix.

The first thrash metal bands were inspired by the likes of Venom, Motörhead, the new wave of British heavy metal and hardcore punk. In 1983, Metallica released their debut album Kill 'Em All, which is seen as the first thrash metal record, and would eventually be certified triple platinum. A few months later, Slayer released their own thrash metal album Show No Mercy. These were "landmark releases characterized by speed, aggression, and an austere seriousness". Thrash was often called "speed metal" in the early 1980s, before the two terms became more defined.

Swedish band Bathory have been described as "the biggest inspiration for the Norwegian black metal movement of the early nineties". Their songs first appeared on the compilation Scandinavian Metal Attack in March 1984. Bathory's first and second albums respectively influenced black metal and death metal. Frontman Quorthon pioneered the shrieked vocals that later came to define black metal.

Swiss band Hellhammer made "truly raw and brutal music" which likewise influenced both black and death metal. They released three demos, and an EP in April 1984. Hellhammer then transformed into Celtic Frost and released their first album Morbid Tales that October. Celtic Frost were a major influence on all styles of extreme metal.

The German thrash metal bands Sodom, Kreator and Destruction "pushed the boundaries of extreme metal". Their first records In the Sign of Evil (1985), Endless Pain (1985) and Sentence of Death (1984) led the way for black metal and death metal bands.

In the United States, death metal was pioneered by the bands Possessed and Death. Possessed released the demo Death Metal in 1984 and their first record Seven Churches in November 1985. They have been described by music journalists and musicians as being "monumental" in developing the death metal style, or as being the first death metal band. Death also released a demo Death by Metal (under the name Mantas) in 1984. The band made a major impact in the emerging Florida death metal scene, and frontman Chuck Schuldiner has been credited as the "Father of Death Metal". Their debut album, Scream Bloody Gore (1987), has been described as "the first true death metal record".

The front cover of the Sarcófago's 1987 debut album, I.N.R.I., was a major influence on black metal's corpse paint style make-up. That record is also considered one of the first-wave black metal albums that helped shape the genre. Their second album, The Laws of Scourge, was one of the first technical death metal records to be released.

== List of genres ==
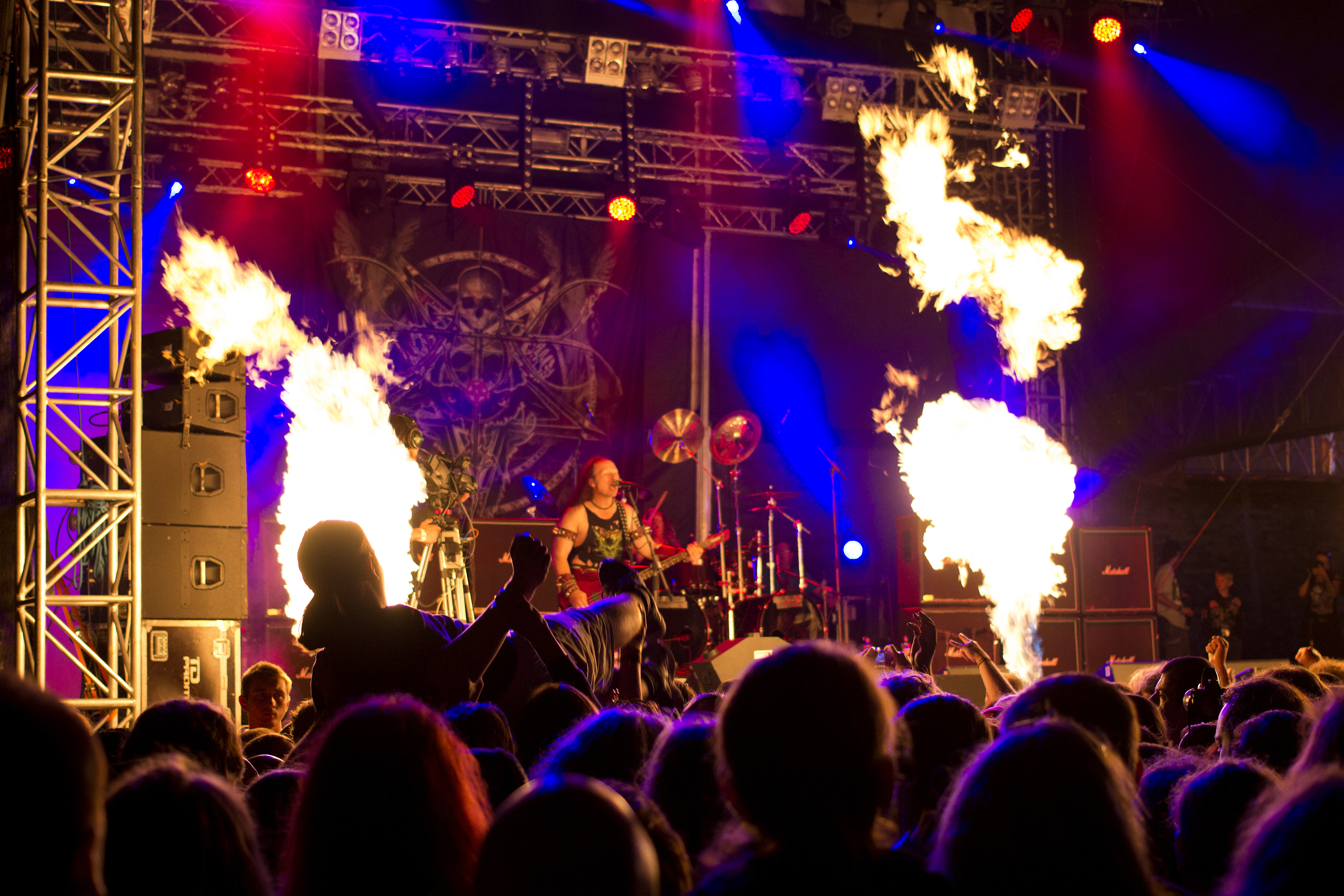
Venom were significant to the development of speed metal into thrash metal into black metal.

=== Primary genres ===
- Black metal
- Death metal
- Doom metal
- Thrash metal

=== Subgenres of primary genres ===
- Subgenres of black metal
  - Ambient black metal
  - Folk black metal
  - Industrial black metal
  - National Socialist black metal
  - Post-black metal
    - Blackgaze
  - Psychedelic black metal
  - Raw black metal
  - Symphonic black metal
  - Unblack metal
- Subgenres of death metal
  - Brutal death metal
    - Slam death metal
  - Christian death metal
  - Industrial death metal
  - Melodic death metal
  - Old school death metal
  - Psychedelic death metal
  - Symphonic death metal
  - Technical death metal
- Subgenres of doom metal
  - Epic doom
  - Traditional doom
- Subgenres of thrash metal
  - Technical thrash metal

=== Fusion genres ===
==== Fusions between primary genres ====
- Black-doom
  - Depressive suicidal black metal
- Blackened death-doom
- Blackened death metal
  - Melodic black-death
  - War metal
- Blackened thrash metal
- Death-doom
  - Funeral doom
- Deathrash

==== Fusions with punk rock styles ====
- Crossover thrash
- Crust punk
  - Blackened crust
    - Red and Anarchist black metal
  - Crack rock steady
  - Crustcore
  - Neo crust
- Grindcore
  - Blackened grindcore
  - Deathgrind
  - Electrogrind
  - Goregrind
    - Gorenoise
    - Pornogrind
  - Noisegrind
- Metalcore
  - Deathcore
  - Easycore
  - Electronicore
  - Mathcore
  - Melodic metalcore
  - Nintendocore
  - Nu metalcore
  - Progressive metalcore
  - Risecore
- Sludge metal
  - Sludgecore

==== Fusion with other rock styles ====
- Black 'n' roll
- Death 'n' roll
- Dream thrash
- Gothic-doom
- Progressive doom
- Stoner metal
  - Desert rock

==== Fusions with other musical styles ====
- Drone metal
- Pagan metal
- Viking metal

=== Derivatives ===
Genres influenced by extreme metal but usually not considered extreme themselves:

- Avant-garde metal
- Beatdown hardcore, influenced by thrash metal;
- Crunkcore, influenced by metalcore;
- Dungeon synth, influenced by black metal;
- Funk metal, influenced by thrash metal;
- Gothic metal, influenced by death-doom and doom metal;
- Groove metal, influenced by thrash metal and death metal;
- Grunge, influenced by sludge metal and thrash metal;
- Hyperpop, influenced by metalcore;
- Neoclassical metal, influenced by thrash metal;
- Nu metal, influenced by thrash metal;
- Pop screamo, influenced by metalcore;
- Post-metal, influenced by doom metal and later by black metal;
- Power metal, influenced by thrash metal;
- Sass, influenced by grindcore and metalcore;
- Tough guy hardcore, influenced by thrash metal.

== See also ==
- First-wave black metal
