= Sentence of Death =

EP by Destruction
- Released: 10 November 1984
- Recorded: September 1984 at Caet Studio, Berlin, Germany
- Genres: Thrash metal; black metal
- Length: 19:33
- Labels: SPV/Steamhammer (Germany); Metal Blade (US)
- Producer: Wolfgang Eichholz

Destruction chronology
| Sentence of Death (1984) | Infernal Overkill (1985) |

Professional ratings
Review scores
| Source | Rating |
|---|---|
| Kerrang! | 2.5/5 stars |
| Metal Forces | 8/10 |
| Rock Hard | 8/10 |

Sentence of Death is an EP and the debut release by German thrash metal band Destruction, released on 10 November 1984 by Steamhammer Records.

The album is cited as an influential thrash metal album with black metal influences, which has been dubbed "black thrash". A 1985 review by Metal Forces described the album as having "some of the best lead-work ever heard in black metal".

== Track listing ==
| No. | Title | Length |
|---|---|---|
| 1. | "Intro" | 1:14 |
| 2. | "Total Desaster" | 4:06 |
| 3. | "Black Mass" | 4:00 |
| 4. | "Mad Butcher" | 3:31 |
| 5. | "Satan's Vengeance" | 3:16 |
| 6. | "Devil's Soldiers" | 3:26 |
| Total length: | | 19:33 |

== Personnel ==
Destruction

- Schmier – bass, vocals
- Mike Sifringer – guitars
- Thomas "Tommy" Sandmann – drums

Production

- Wolfgang Eichholz – production
- Horst Müller – engineering
