= Wagner Lamounier =

Brazilian musician

- Also known as: Antichrist
- Born: Wagner Moura Lamounier; 30 April 1969 (age 57); Belo Horizonte, Minas Gerais, Brazil
- Genres: Black metal; death metal; thrash metal
- Occupation: Musician
- Instruments: Vocals; guitar
- Years active: 1984–2000; 2012–present

Wagner Moura Lamounier (born 30 April 1969) is a Brazilian musician who achieved fame for having been the original vocalist of Brazilian thrash metal band Sepultura, and for having created and led the first-wave black/thrash metal band Sarcófago from 1985 until it disbanded in 2000.

== Life and career ==
Lamounier sang briefly with Sepultura during the early part of the band's career, contributing the lyrics to the song "Antichrist" (a reference to his own moniker) featured on the band's first release Bestial Devastation. He then moved to his own band (Sarcófago) which, while less commercially successful than Sepultura, is widely hailed as a major influence on the most extreme spectrum of metal music, being revered by black, thrash and death metal fans.

Lamounier left the music industry when Sarcófago split in 2000, and he is currently a professor of economic science and applied statistic at Universidade Federal de Minas Gerais in Belo Horizonte. In 2012, he formed the stoner metal band The Evil, with their debut album being released in 2017.

Lamounier earned a PhD in Economics from the Federal University of Viçosa and a Bachelor's degree in Economic Sciences from the Federal University of Uberlândia.
