= Teixeirinha =

Brazilian musician (1927–1985)

Teixeirinha "the King of the Disc"
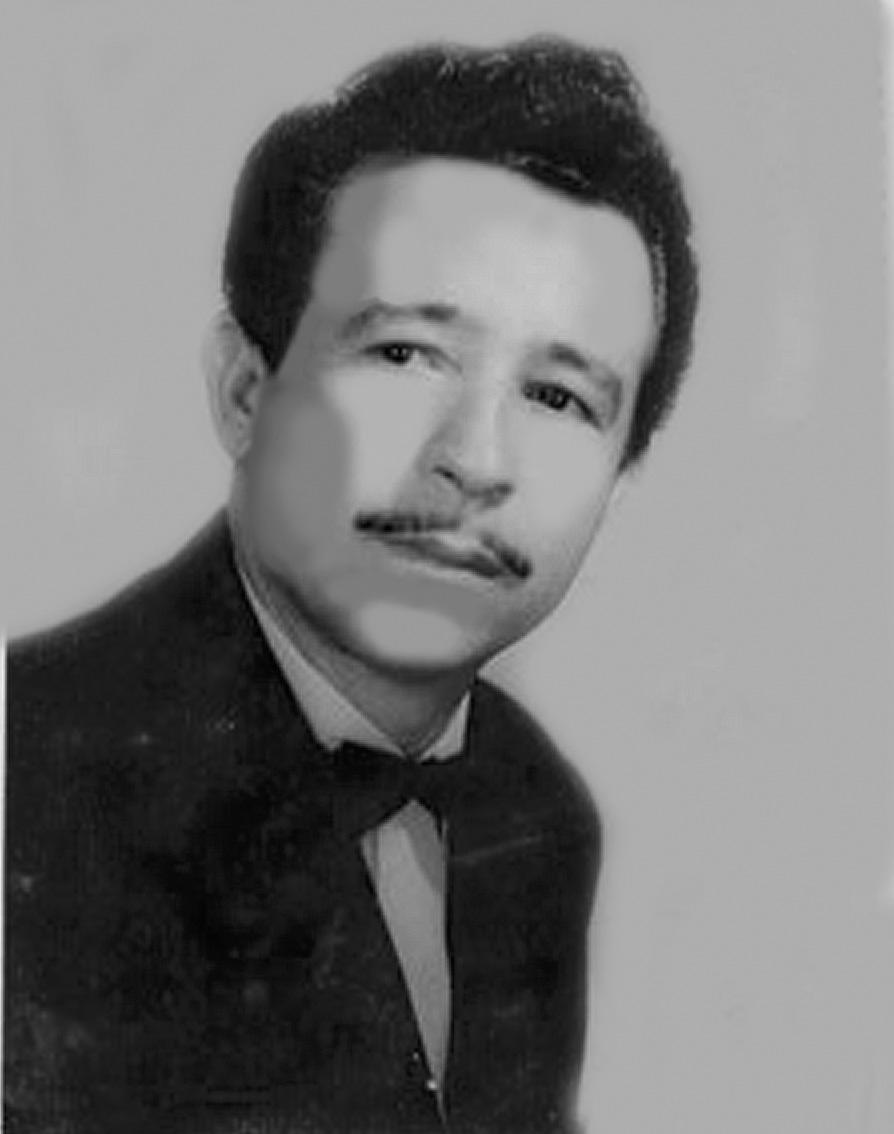
- Teixeirinha in the 1960s

Background information
- Also known as: "Teixeirinha", "the king of the disc" and "the king of the pampas"
- Born: Vítor Mateus Teixeira; 3 March 1927; Rolante, Rio Grande do Sul, Brazil
- Origin: Brazil
- Died: 4 December 1985 (aged 58) Porto Alegre, Rio Grande do Sul, Brazil
- Genre: Brazilian gaucho music
- Occupations: Musician, singer-songwriter
- Instruments: Vocals, acoustic guitar
- Years active: 1959–1985
- Labels: Warner Music do Brasil, Universal Music Group
- Website: www.teixeirinha.com.br

"Gaúcho de Passo Fundo"
from the album "O Gaúcho Coração do Rio Grande". Recorded in 1960.

Teixeirinha (March 3, 1927 - December 4, 1985), given name Vitor Mateus Teixeira, was a Brazilian musician. A best-selling artist, Teixeirinha holds several records, such as the first artist to sell one million copies of a disc containing a single song, Coração de Luto. Teixeirinha also holds the record for most songs recorded in Brazil, being 758 across over 50 albums. He also composed exactly 1,200 songs. He was popular worldwide, particularly in Europe and Africa.

== Biography ==
Teixeirinha was born in the city of Rolante, Mascaradas district, Rio Grande do Sul, Brazil on March 3, 1927. He had one brother and two sisters. At the age of seven, his father, Saturno Teixeira, passed away, while at the age of nine, his mother, Ledurina Mateus Teixeira, died as well, leaving him and his siblings to be adopted by relatives. However, those relatives were unable to care for him, so he began working side jobs, such as carrying bags, selling food, and delivering newspapers.

Teixeirinha self-registered as a Brazilian citizen at the age of sixteen, he self-registered as a Brazilian citizen. At the age of eighteen, he joined the Brazilian Army. However, he was not enlisted to serve and instead worked for the Department of Highways as a machine operator, which he did for six years.

Following his time as a machine operator, Teixeirinha began singing for radio stations in various cities, including Lajeado, Estrela, Rio Pardo, Santa Cruz do Sul. It was during this time that he met his wife, Zoraida Lima Teixeira, whom he married in 1957. The couple moved to Soledade, then to Passo Fundo.

In 1959, he was invited to São Paulo to do his first recordings, a 78RPM single comprising the songs Xote Soledade and Briga no Batizado. Later that year, he recorded Coração de Luto, a song which would go on to sell over 25 million copies It was the first time any musician had sold one million copies of a single.

Following the success of these releases, Teixeirinha sold his house in Passo Fundo and moved to Porto Alegre. He was invited to move to São Paulo by Chantecler, but refused.

Teixeirinha began performing across Brazil. During this time, he gained the nicknames “Gaúcho Coração do Rio Grande” and “O Rei do Disco.” In 1963, he won the “Chico Viola” trophy, awarded by TV Record of São Paulo "Astros do Disco", a gala program on Brazilian television, which he won for being the best-selling singer for two consecutive years. Internationally he won the “Elefante de Ouro” trophy due to being the highest selling artist in Portugal.

Teixeirinha continued performing on radio for 20 years, with morning and evening daily radio show, as well as a weekly show on Sunday mornings.

Across the course of his career, Teixeirinha went diamond five times and gold 13 times. He was granted emeritus status in Passo Fundo, Santo Antônio da Patrulha, Rolante, and other cities.

In the 1970s, Teixeirinha performed internationally. In 1973 he played 15 shows in the United States and in 1975 he played 18 shows in Canada. He also performed in Portugal, France, Spain and England, as well as most countries in South America. He was frequently accompanied by accordionist Mary Terezinha.

Teixeirinha recorded more than 50 albums which remained unreleased at the time of his death. He composed over 1,200 song, some of which remained unpublished, and recorded 758.

== Personal life ==
Teixeirinha had seven daughters, Márcia Teixeira, Nancy Teixeira, Margareth Teixeira, Beta Teixeira, Líria Teixeira, Liane Teixeira and Preta Teixeira, and two sons, Vitor Mateus Teixeira Filho and Alexandre Teixeira.

In 1985 Teixeirinha discovered he had lymphoma. After making progress on recover, on 4 December 1985, he had a heart attack. By the time he arrived at the hospital, he was dead. Teixeirinha was buried in the Santa Casa da Misericórdia cemetery in Porto Alegre. Thousands of people attended his funeral, requiring nearby streets be shut down.

== Bibliography ==
- 1968 - Heart of Mourning - Comics
- 1996 - Teixeirinha and Cinema (By Mirian de Souza Rossini)
- 2007 - Teixeirinha, the Gaucho Heart of Rio Grande (By Israel Lopes)
- 2018 - Teixeirinha Heart of Brazil (By Daniel Felix)
- 2019 - Teixeiirnha, the Gaucho Heart of Rio Grande, Volume 2 (By Israel Lopes)

== Discography ==
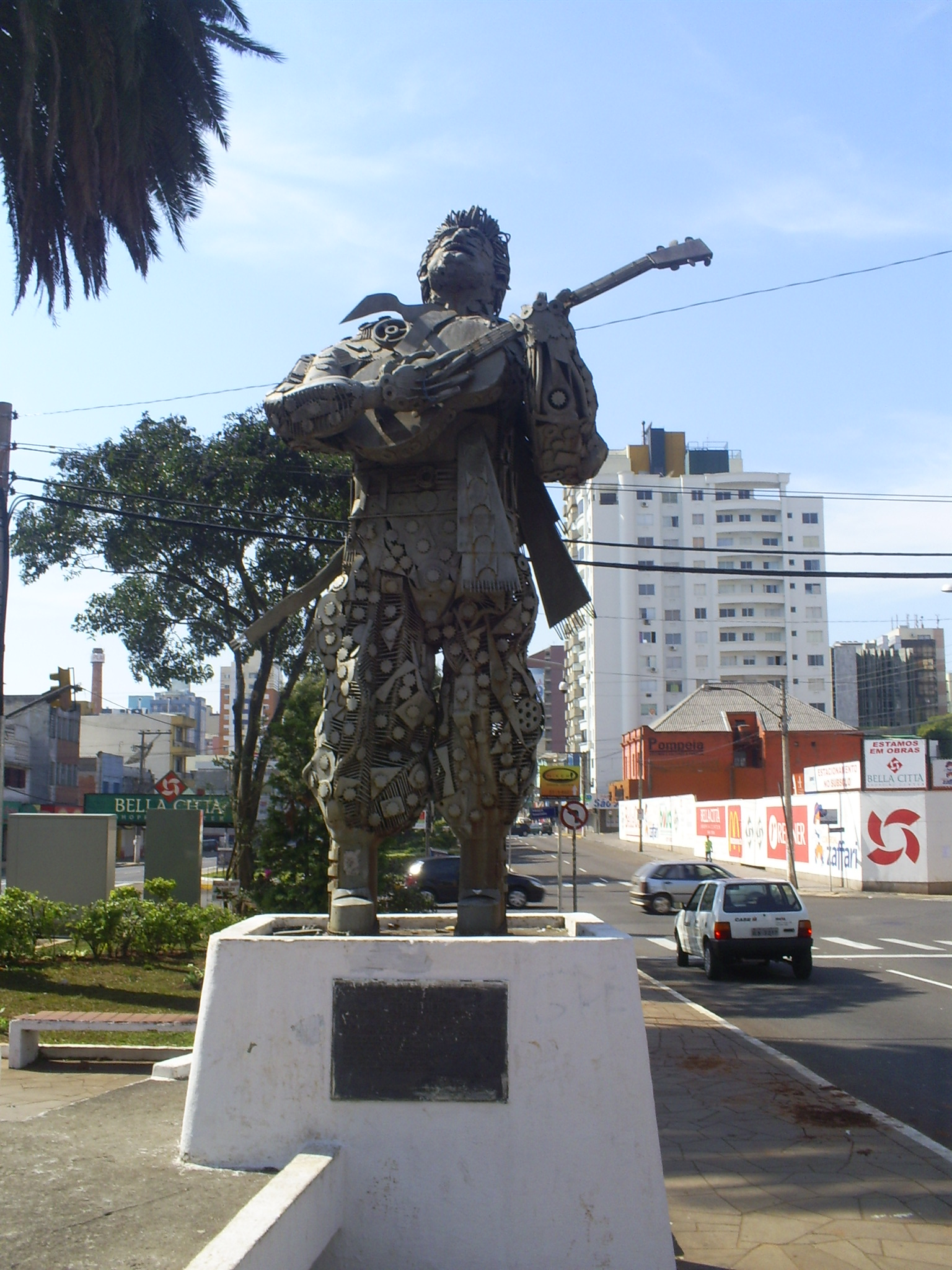
Statue of Teixeirinha in the city of Passo Fundo, a city that the singer adopted as his own.

=== Studio albums ===
With a 26-year career, Teixeirinha over 50 studio albums

- 1960 - O Gaúcho Coração do Rio Grande (Warner Music Group)
- 1961 - Assim é nos pampas (Warner Music Group)
- 1961 - Um gaúcho canta para o Brasil (Warner Music Group)
- 1962 - O Gaúcho Coração do Rio Grande, volume 4 (Warner Music Group)
- 1963 - Saudades de Passo Fundo (Warner Music Group)
- 1963 - Teixeirinha interpreta Músicas de Amigos (Warner Music Group)
- 1963 - Êta gaúcho bom (Warner Music Group)
- 1964 - Teixeirinha Show (Warner Music Group)
- 1964 - Gaúcho de Bagé (Warner Music Group)
- 1964 - Gaúcho autêntico (Warner Music Group)
- 1964 - Canarinho cantador (Warner Music Group)
- 1965 - O Rei do Disco (Warner Music Group)
- 1965 - Bate-bate coração (Warner Music Group)
- 1965 - Disco de ouro (Warner Music Group)
- 1966 - Desafio P'ra Valer (Warner Music Group
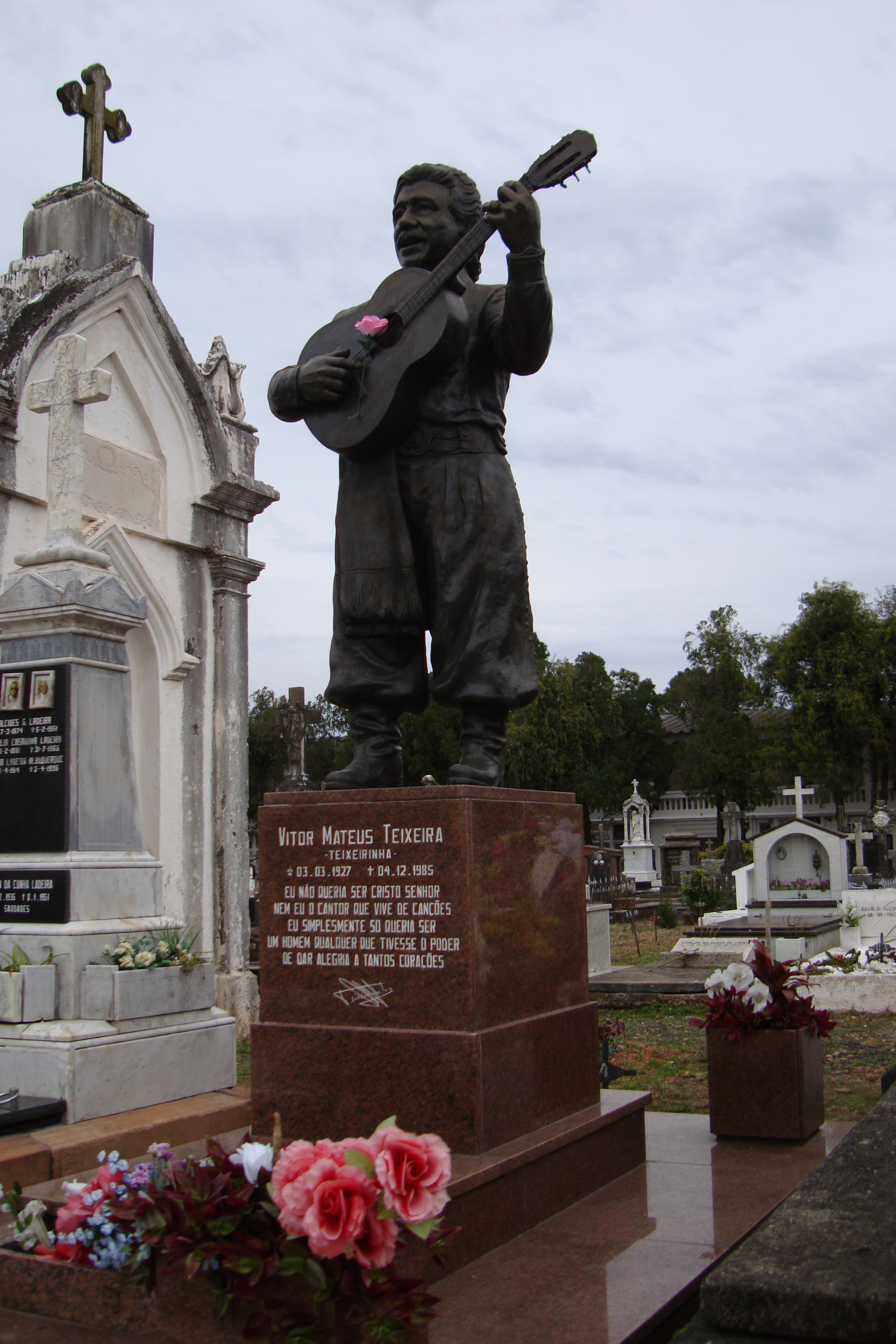
  Statue of Teixeirinha on his tomb in the Santa Casa da Misericórdia Cemetery in Porto Alegre.
- 1966 - Teixeirinha no cinema (Warner Music Group)
- 1967 - Coração de Luto - soundtrack from the film (Warner Music Group)
- 1967 - Mocinho aventureiro (Universal Music Group)
- 1968 - Dorme Angelita (Universal Music Group)
- 1968 - Doce coração de mãe (Universal Music Group)
- 1968 - Última tropeada (Universal Music Group)
- 1969 - O Rei (Universal Music Group)
- 1969 - Volume de prata (Universal Music Group)
- 1970 - Carícias de amor (Universal Music Group)
- 1970 - Doce Amor (Universal Music Group)
- 1971 - Num Fora de série (Universal Music Group)
- 1971 - Entre a cruz e o amor (Universal Music Group)
- 1971 - Chimarrão da hospitalidade (Universal Music Group)
- 1972 - Ela tornou-se freira - soundtrack from the film (Universal Music Group)
- 1972 - Minha homenagem (Universal Music Group)
- 1972 - Último Adeus (Universal Music Group)
- 1973 - O Internacional (Universal Music Group)
- 1973 - Teixeirinha Sempre Teixeirinha (Universal Music Group)
- 1974 - Última Gineteada (Universal Music Group)
- 1975 - Trilha Sonoda do Filme Pobre João e outros Sucessos (Universal Music Group)
- 1975 - Aliança de ouro (Universal Music Group)
- 1975 - Lindo Rancho (Universal Music Group)
- 1976 - Coração de Luto (Universal Music Group)
- 1977 - Novo Som de Teixeirinha (Universal Music Group)
- 1977 - Norte a Sul (Universal Music Group)
- 1977 - Canta meu povo (Universal Music Group)
- 1978 - Amor de verdade (Warner Music Group)
- 1978 - O Vigilante (Warner Music Group)
- 1978 - Menina da gaita (Warner Music Group)
- 1979 - 20 anos de glória (Warner Music Group)
- 1980 - Menina Margareth (Warner Music Group)
- 1981 - Rio Grande de Outrora (Warner Music Group)
- 1981 - Iemanjá - soundtrack from the film (Warner Music Group)
- 1982 - Que droga de vida (Warner Music Group)
- 1982 - Dez desafios inéditos - Teixeirinha and Mary Terezinha (Warner Music Group)
- 1983 - Chegando de longe (Warner Music Group)
- 1984 - Guerra dos Desafios - Teixeirinha e Nalva Aguiar (Warner Music Group)
- 1984 - Quem é você agora (Warner Music Group)
- 1985 - Amor aos passarinhos (Warner Music Group)
- 2020 - Inéditas (NIKITA Music)

=== Compilation albums ===
- 1965 - Sucessos de Teixeirinha na Venezuela (Warner Music Group)
- 1965 - Rancheiras (Warner Music Group)
- 1967 - Os Grandes Sucessos de Teixeirinha (Warner Music Group)
- 1973 - Os Grandes Sucessos de Teixeirinha (Warner Music Group)
- 1974 - Los Grandes Exitos de Teixeirinha
- 1975 - Teixeirinha no Xote
- 1976 - Teixeirinha no Xote, Volume 2 (Universal Music Group)
- 1976 - Black or White
- 1979 - Milonga da Fronteira (Warner Music Group)
- 1985 - O Rei dos Pampas (Universal Music Group)
- 1985 - Recado do Céu (Warner Music Group)
- 1992 - Amor de Mãe (Warner Music Group)
- 1992 - Popularidade (Warner Music Group)
- 1998 - Raízes dos Pampas, Volume 1 (Universal Music Group)
- 1999 - Raízes dos Pampas, Volume 2 (Universal Music Group)

=== Special Albums ===
- 1994 - Teixeirinha Canta Com Amigos
- 2007 - Especial Teixeirinha
- 2010 - Sucessos de Teixeirinha, Teixeirinha Filho e Neto

== Filmography ==
In 1964, Teixeirinha wrote the story of the film “Coração de Luto”, which was produced by Leopoldis Som, in 1966, another box office record. In 1969, he staged in the film "Motorista sem Limites" together with Valter D'Avila, produced by Itacir Rossi. In 1970 he created his own production company Teixeirinha Produções Artísticas Ltda, for which he wrote, produced and distributed ten films.

- 1967 - Coração de Luto
- 1969 - Motorista sem limites
- 1972 - Ela Tornou-se Freira
- 1973 - Teixeirinha a 7 Provas
- 1974 - O Pobre João
- 1975 - Carmen a Cigana
- 1976 - A Quadrilha do Perna Dura
- 1977 - Na Trilha da Justiça
- 1978 - Meu Pobre Coração de Luto
- 1978 - Gaúcho de Passo Fundo
- 1980 - Tropeiro Velho
- 1981 - A Filha de Iemanjá

== Awards ==
- 1960 - Gold Record - Coração de Luto (Single)
- 1960 - Gold Record - O Gaúcho Coração do Rio Grande (Album)
- 1960 - Taça das músicas "Coração de Luto" and "Amor de Mãe"
- 1962 - Chico Viola - TV Record
- 1963 - Elefante de Ouro - Portugal
- 1963 - Rádio ABC - Música "Volte Papai"
- 1965 - Gold Record - O Rei do Disco (Album)
- 1965 - Gold Record - Disco de Ouro (Album)
- 1967 - Gold Record - Mocinho Aventureiro (ALbum)
- 1968 - Gold Record - Dorme Angelita (Album)
- 1970 - Gold Record - Carícias de Amor (Album)
- 1973 - Gold Record - O Internacional (Album)
- 1975 - Gold Record - Aliança de Ouro (album)
- 1977 - Gold Record - Canta Meu Povo (Album)
- 1978 - Military Brigade Cup for the song: "O Vigilante"
- 1978 - Gold Record - Menina da Gaita (Album)
- 1980 - Gold Record - Menina Margareth (Album)
- 1985 - Gold Record - Quem é Você Agora (Album)
- 2019 - Prêmio Culturas Populares

== Teixeirinha Foundation ==
The Vitor Mateus Teixeira Foundation (Teixeirinha) is a foundation established to maintain Teixeirinha's collection of musical merchandise, as well as to promote his legacy. It's maintained through the companies Editora Internacional Teixeirinha and Teixeirinha Produções Artísticas Ltda. Márcia Bernadeth Lima Teixeira dos Santos serves as the executive director.

== Monuments ==
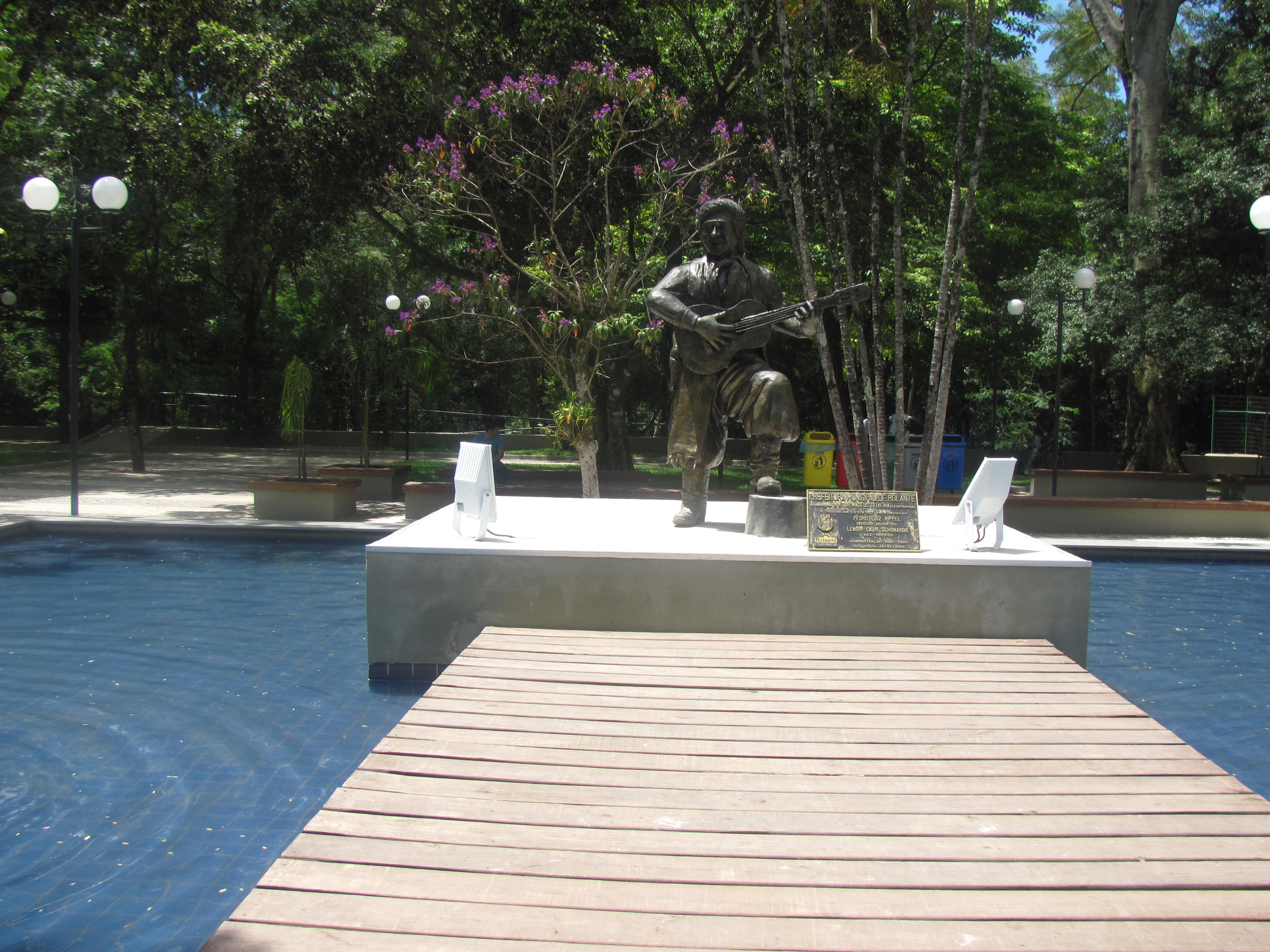
Statue of Teixeirinha in the central square of the city of Rolante.

In 1986, a statue of Teixeirinha was built in his tomb, which he had requested. In 1995, another statue was built in the city of Passo Fundo, where he had lived. Another statue was built in 2001, in Rolante, where Teixeirinha was born. These monuments are visited by thousands of fans each year. They're also depicted in postcards.

== See also ==
- Brazilian Gaucho Music
- José Portella Delavy
