= Passo Fundo =

Municipality of Rio Grande do Sul, Brazil

- Municipality
- Municipality of Passo Fundo
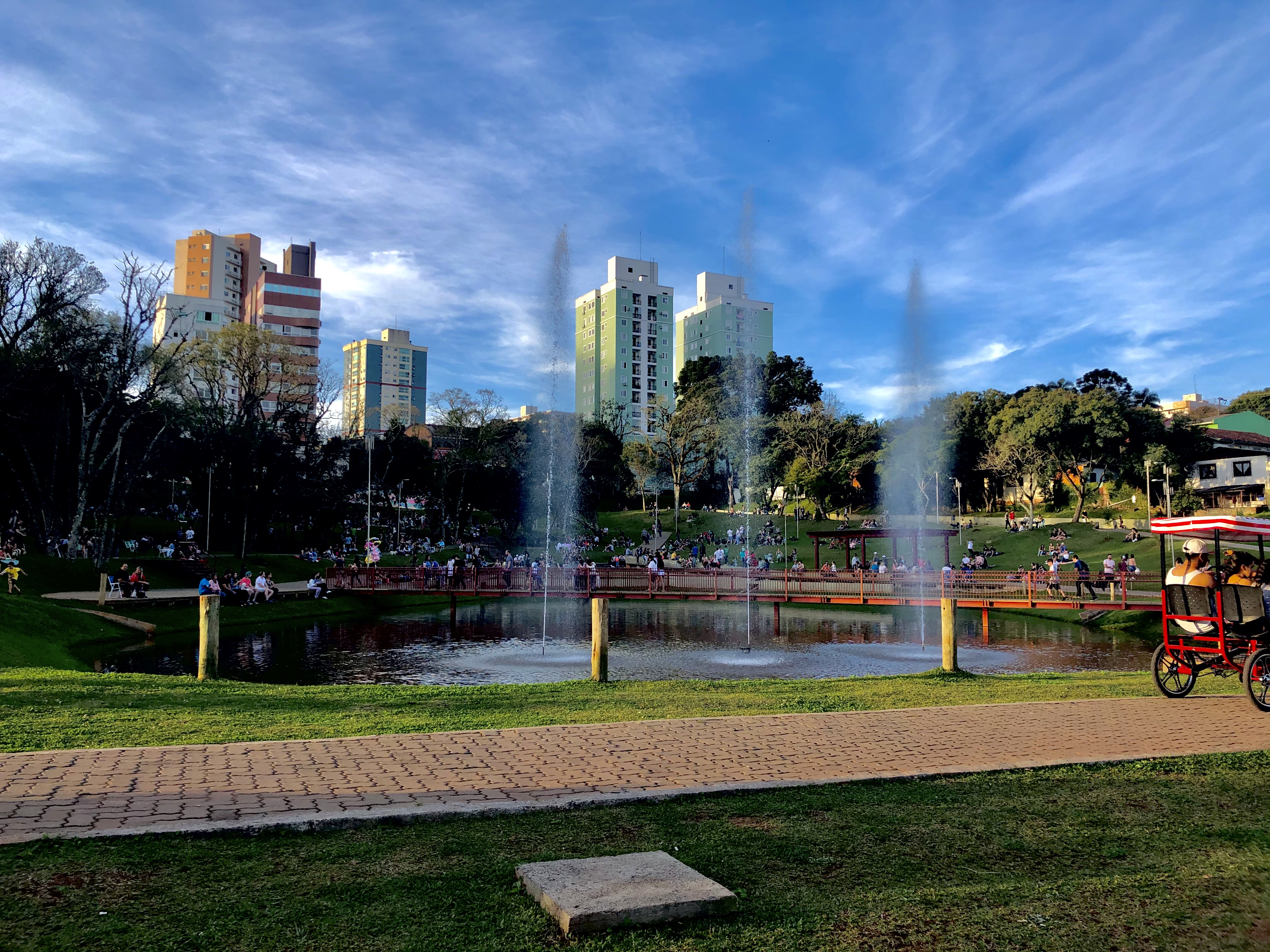
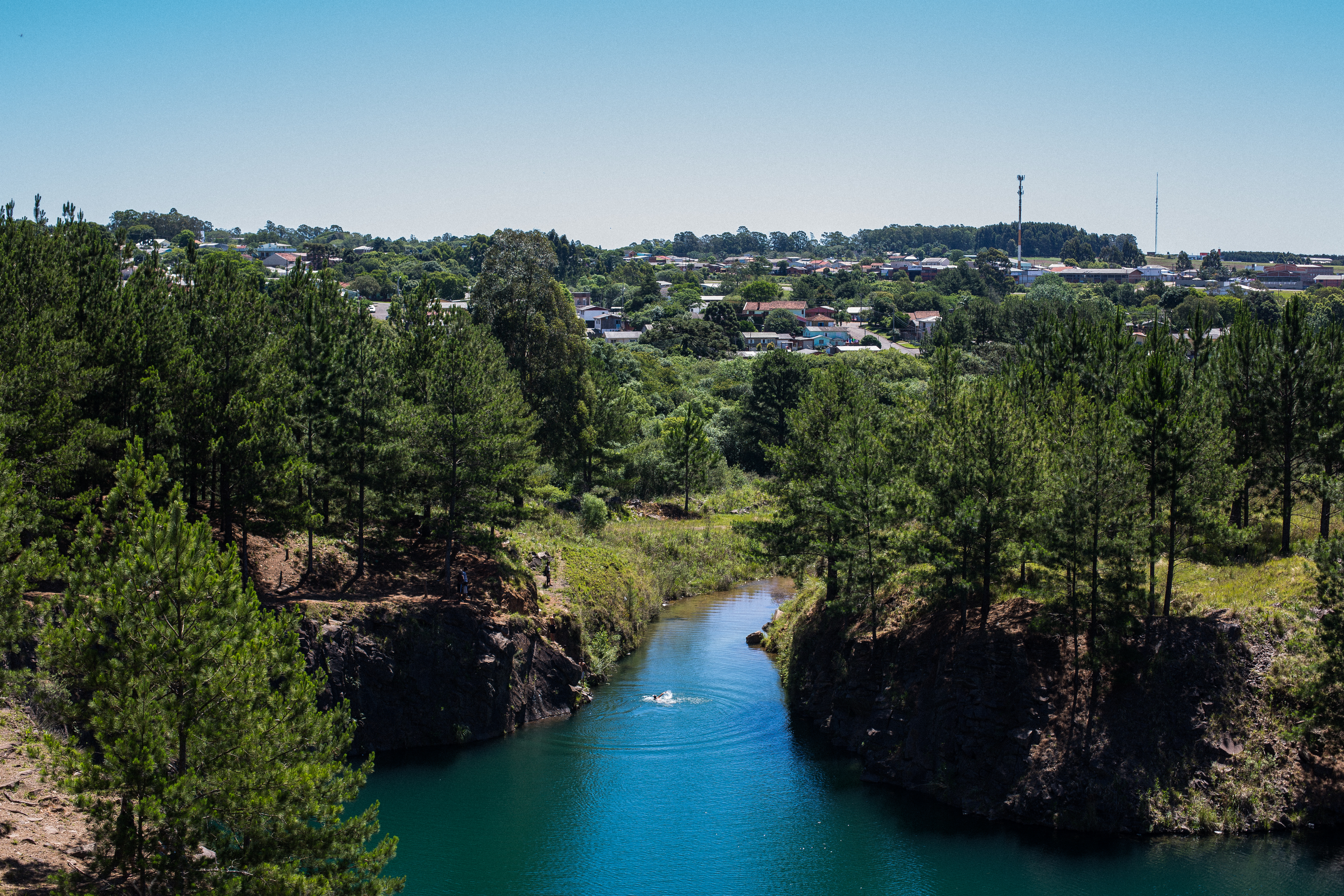
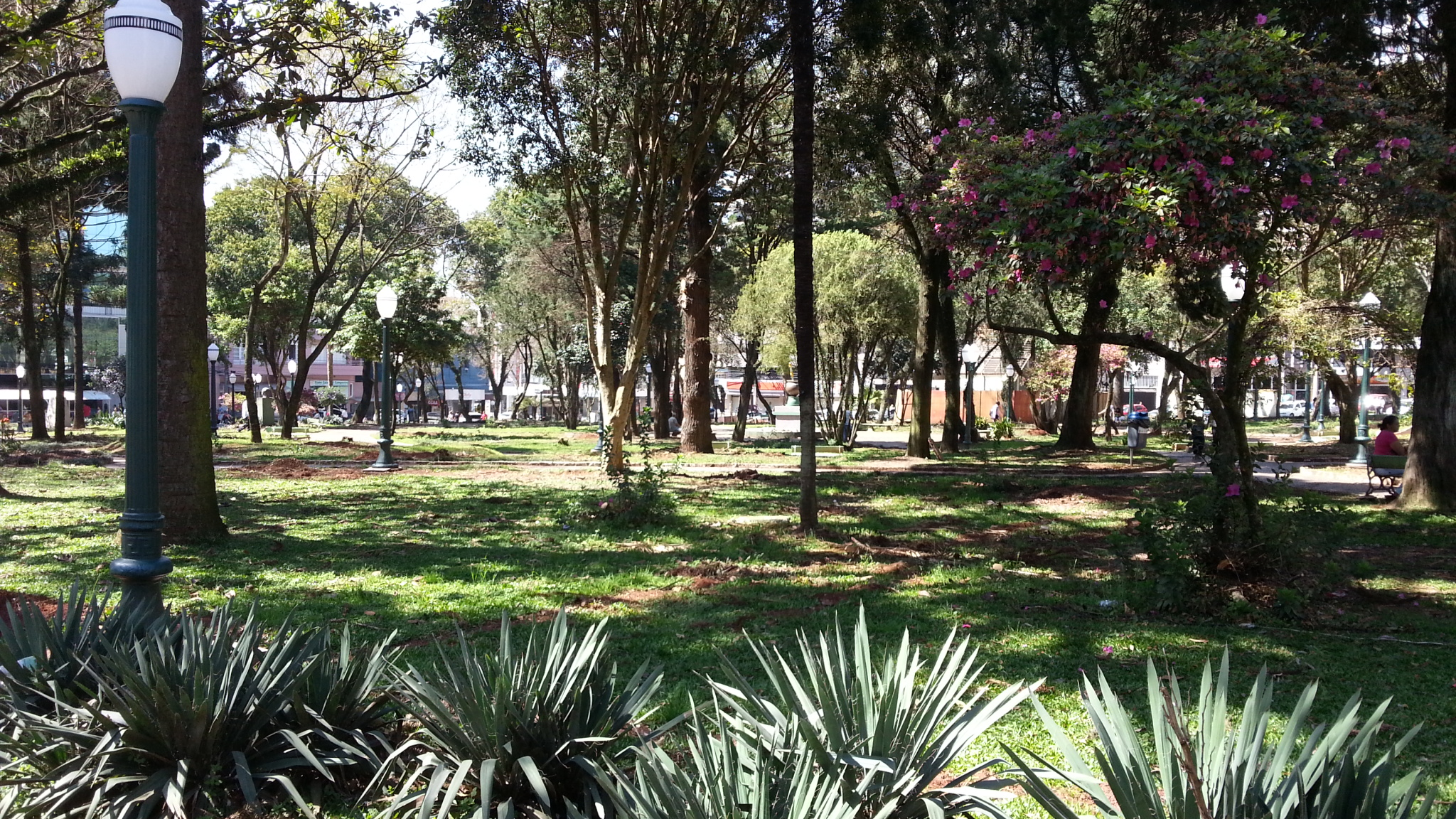
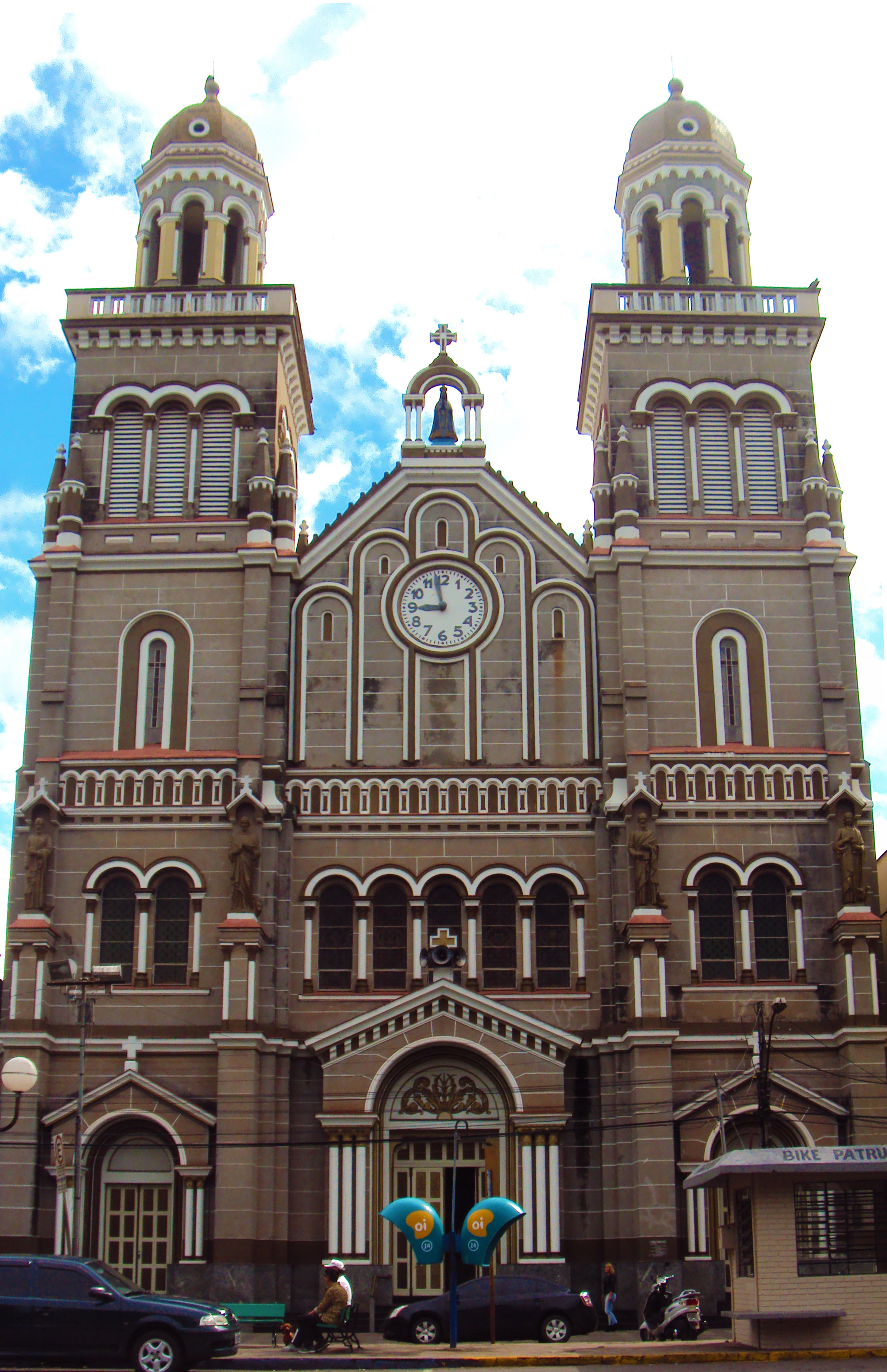
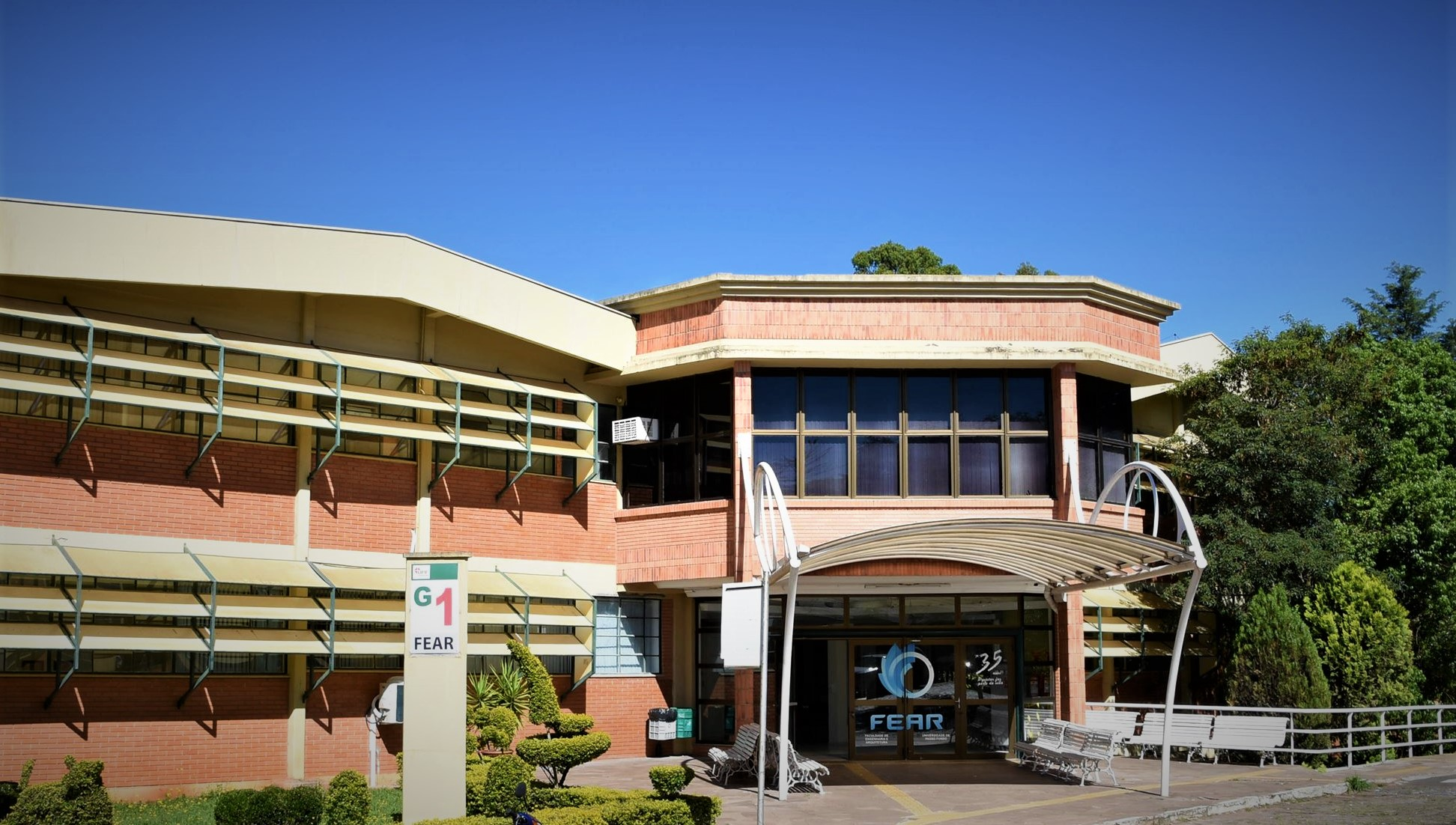
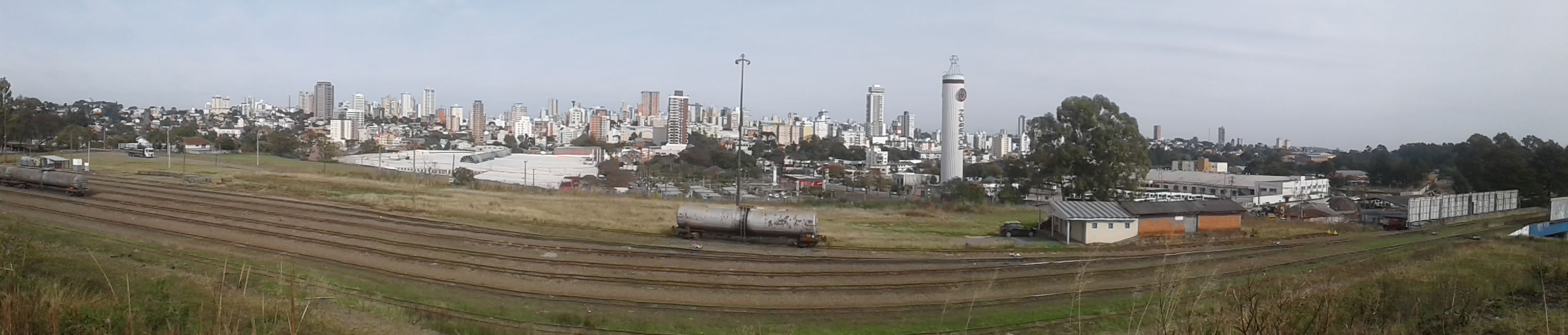

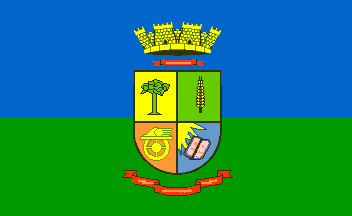
- Flag Coat of arms
- Nicknames: Capital of the mid-Plateau, Land of the Good Folks
- Motto: Work, Brotherhood, Progress!
- Location in Rio Grande do Sul

- Location in Brazil
- Coordinates: 28°15′S 52°24′W
- Country: Brazil
- Region: South
- State: Rio Grande do Sul
- Founded: 1827
- Incorporated: 1857

Government
  - Mayor: Pedro Cezar de Almeida Neto

Area
  - Total: 758.27 km^{2} (292.77 sq mi)
- Elevation: 687 m (2,254 ft)

Population (2022 Brazilian Census)
  - Total: 206,215
  - Estimate (2025): 214,811
  - Density: 241/km^{2} (620/sq mi)
- Time zone: UTC−3 (BRT)
- HDI (2010): 0.776 – high
- Website: pmpf.rs.gov.br

Passo Fundo is a municipality in the north of the southern Brazilian state of Rio Grande do Sul. It is named after its river. It's the tenth largest city in the state with an estimated population of 204,722 inhabitants living in a total municipal area of 780 km^{2}.

Passo Fundo is a city well known because of the singer, composer and filmmaker Vitor Mateus Teixeira, better known as Teixeirinha, he was born in the city of Rolante in Rio Grande do Sul, and adopted the city of Passo Fundo as his own, the singer liked a lot from the city, in 1960 he composed the song "Gaúcho de Passo Fundo", which was very successful and made Passo Fundo become a known city throughout Brazil. Teixeirinha composed two more songs in homage to the city of Passo Fundo, they are "Saudades de Passo Fundo" (1963) and "Passo Fundo do Coração" (1973), as well as producing and starring in a film set in the city, a film called "O Gaucho de Passo Fundo", released in 1978.

== History ==
The territory that today constitutes the Passo Fundo region was part of the famous Jesuit Province of the Eastern Missions of Uruguay. Its first inhabitants were the Tupi-Guarani indigenous people and, later, the Jê group, notably the Kaingang, called "Coroados". They sustained themselves through hunting, honey, fruits, and the cultivation of corn and beans. The municipality of Passo Fundo, emancipated by Provincial Law No. 340 of January 28, 1857, and established on August 7 of the same year, was formed from 1827 onwards, as a result of the occupation of the Middle and Upper Uruguay Plateau, with its original territory now encompassing one hundred and seven municipalities in Rio Grande do Sul. It was named after the Passo Fundo River, used by muleteers since the 18th century.

To avoid the difficulties of the old road that passed through Viamão and Santo Antônio da Patrulha and headed towards the lands of São Paulo, new paths were opened that crossed the pampas. The drovers chose to enter the still deserted countryside, thus traveling a less winding route between southern Rio Grande do Sul and São Paulo, and vice versa. The designation of the ford, that is, the shallow stream that allowed passage on foot, called "passo," extended to the respective river and the place where it was located, a small cluster of houses formed next to the road, thus giving rise to the current city of Passo Fundo.

== Geography ==
=== Accessibility ===
The following highways leave Passo Fundo:

- BR 285: east to west
- BR 153: north to south
- RS 324: northwest to southeast
- RS 135: northeast

The town is served by Lauro Kurtz Airport located on BR-285, São José. Daily flights from Passo Fundo are headed to:

- With Oceanair - Guarulhos, SP
- With Azul - Campinas, SP
- With NHT - Porto Alegre, Santo Ângelo, Pelotas, Rio Grande, Sant'Ana do Livramento/Riveira, Santa Maria, Florianópolis, Curitiba, Santa Rosa, Erechim, Caçador, and Joaçaba.

=== Distances to other major cities ===
Distances from Passo Fundo to:

- Bagé, RS: 541 km (336 mi).
- Balneário Camboriú, SC: 570 km (350 mi)
- Buenos Aires, Argentina: 1,238 km (769 mi).
- Caxias do Sul, RS: 207 km (129 mi).
- Chapecó, SC: 180 km (110 mi).
- Curitiba, PR: 582 km (362 mi).
- Florianópolis, SC: 510 km (320 mi).
- Montevideo, Uruguay: 1,026 km (638 mi).
- Pelotas, RS: 561 km (349 mi).
- Porto Alegre, RS: 280 km (170 mi).
- Santana do Livramento, RS: 591 km (367 mi).
- Santa Maria, RS: 293 km (182 mi).
- São Paulo, SP : 966 km (600 mi).
- Uruguaiana, RS: 562 km (349 mi).

=== Climate ===
Lying near latitude 28° South at an elevation of 690 m (2,260 ft), Passo Fundo has a humid subtropical climate. The annual mean temperature is 17.7 °C (63.9 °F) with highs of 28.4 °C (83.1 °F) in January and 18.3 °C (64.9 °F) in July and lows of 17.7 °C (63.9 °F) in January and 8.8 °C (47.8 °F) in July. Winters can be slightly cool with temperatures below 0 °C (32 °F), frequent frosts and occasional snowfalls. Rainfall is spread out throughout the year with September receiving the highest amount of 183.4 mm (7.22 in) and May receiving the lowest amount of 133.5 mm (5.26 in). Humidity is around 70% every month.

Climate data for Passo Fundo (1991–2020)
Month	Jan	Feb	Mar	Apr	May	Jun	Jul	Aug	Sep	Oct	Nov	Dec	Year
Record high °C (°F)	35.0 (95.0)	35.1 (95.2)	35.9 (96.6)	32.0 (89.6)	29.8 (85.6)	27.2 (81.0)	27.1 (80.8)	31.6 (88.9)	32.8 (91.0)	34.5 (94.1)	35.2 (95.4)	36.3 (97.3)	36.3 (97.3)
Mean daily maximum °C (°F)	28.4 (83.1)	27.8 (82.0)	27.1 (80.8)	24.7 (76.5)	20.4 (68.7)	18.6 (65.5)	18.3 (64.9)	20.7 (69.3)	21.6 (70.9)	24.3 (75.7)	26.8 (80.2)	28.4 (83.1)	23.9 (75.0)
Daily mean °C (°F)	22.3 (72.1)	21.8 (71.2)	20.8 (69.4)	18.3 (64.9)	14.7 (58.5)	13.1 (55.6)	12.5 (54.5)	14.4 (57.9)	15.6 (60.1)	18.2 (64.8)	20.2 (68.4)	22.0 (71.6)	17.8 (64.0)
Mean daily minimum °C (°F)	17.7 (63.9)	17.4 (63.3)	16.4 (61.5)	13.9 (57.0)	10.8 (51.4)	9.5 (49.1)	8.6 (47.5)	9.9 (49.8)	11.2 (52.2)	13.6 (56.5)	14.9 (58.8)	16.9 (62.4)	13.4 (56.1)
Record low °C (°F)	9.4 (48.9)	8.5 (47.3)	6.1 (43.0)	2.1 (35.8)	−1.5 (29.3)	−1.8 (28.8)	−3.5 (25.7)	−2.5 (27.5)	−2.5 (27.5)	3.4 (38.1)	3.5 (38.3)	6.5 (43.7)	−3.5 (25.7)
Average precipitation mm (inches)	173.7 (6.84)	146.9 (5.78)	137.3 (5.41)	140.2 (5.52)	153.5 (6.04)	158.1 (6.22)	163.0 (6.42)	130.8 (5.15)	165.5 (6.52)	239.4 (9.43)	160.1 (6.30)	162.2 (6.39)	1,930.7 (76.01)
Average precipitation days (≥ 1.0 mm)	11	10	9	8	8	9	9	8	10	11	9	10	112
Average relative humidity (%)	73.5	75.3	73.8	72.8	76.4	78.9	76.3	71.7	72.5	71.6	65.1	67.3	72.9
Mean monthly sunshine hours	239	207.2	209.6	189.3	173.7	150.5	176.8	182.1	165.2	184.9	233.1	248.9	2,360.3
Source: Instituto Nacional de Meteorologia

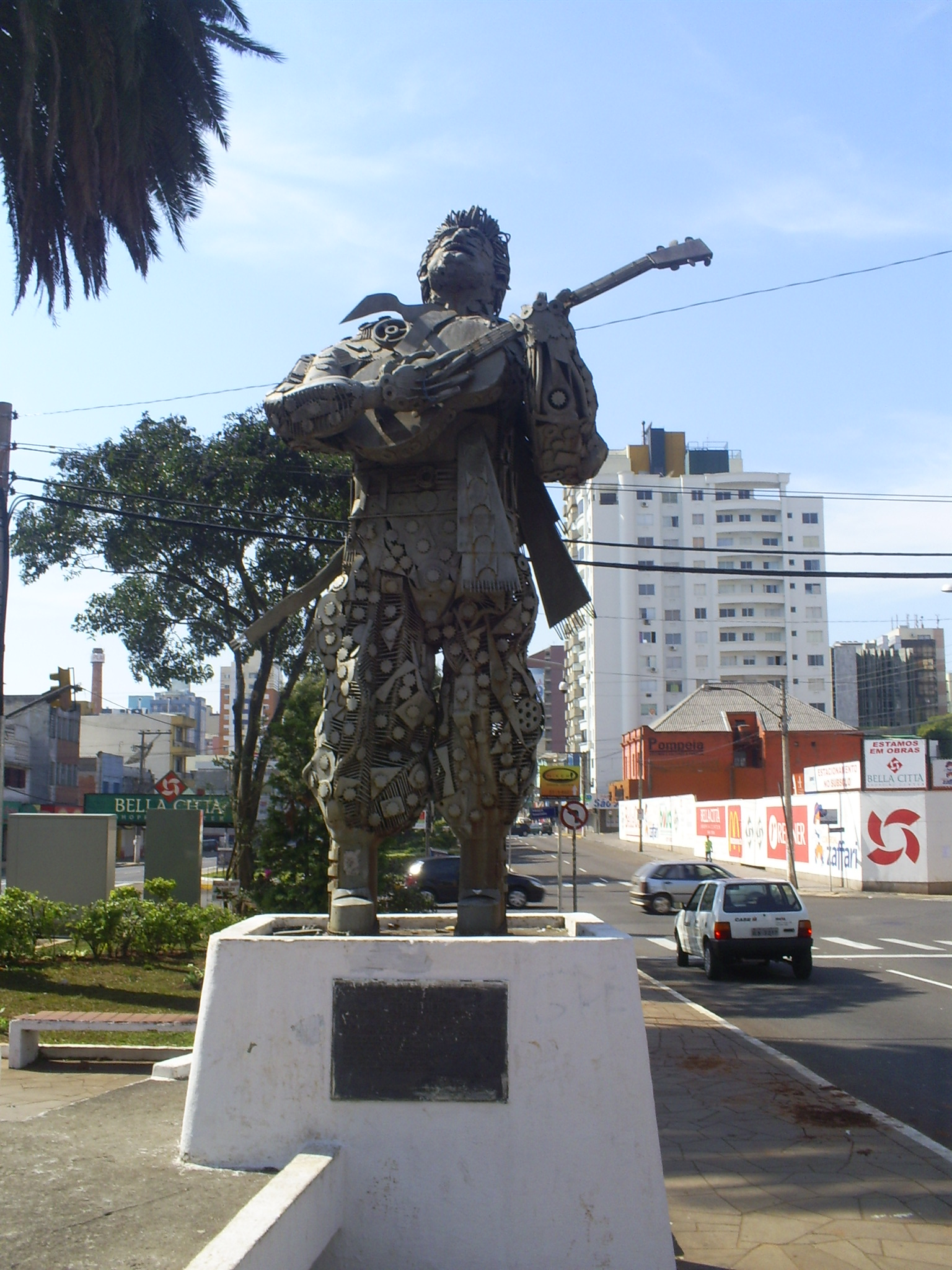
A statue honoring gaucho folk singer Victor Matheus Teixeira in Passo Fundo.

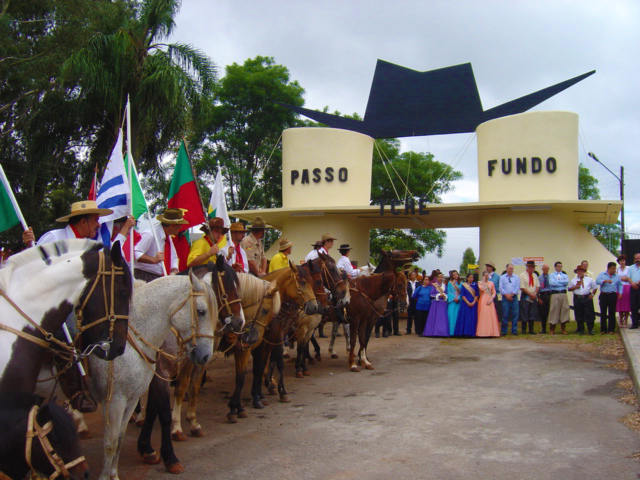
Roseland Rodeo Grounds in Passo Fundo (Parque de Rodeios Roselândia).

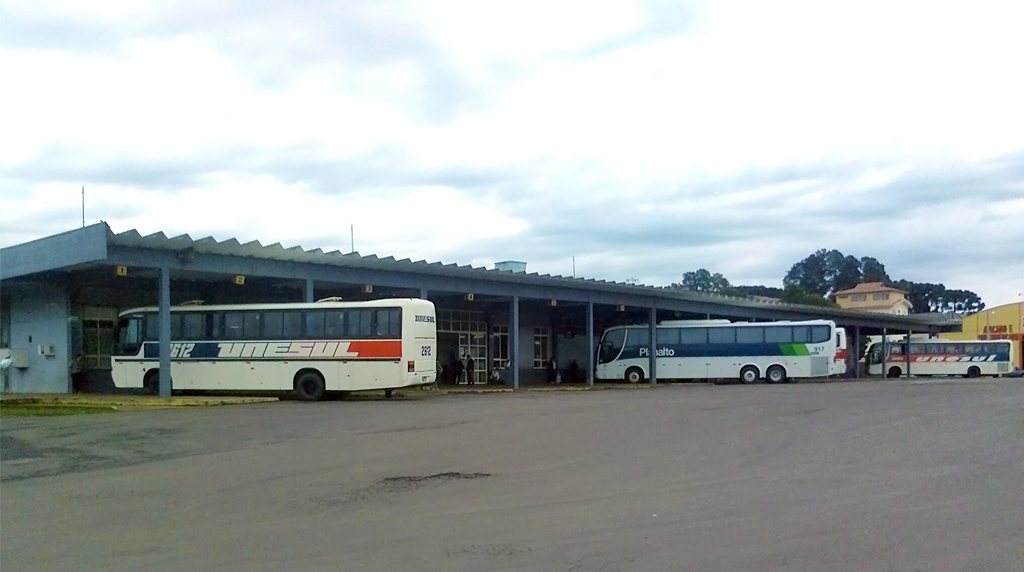
Passo Fundo bus terminal.

== Economy ==
The economy is predominantly based on services, with some light industry and agriculture in the surrounding area. Transformation industries employed 8,731 workers in 2006, with commerce employing 19,287, public administration employing 2,808, education employing 3,374, and health employing 4,624 workers.

In the agricultural sector there was limited cattle-raising activity due to the small area of the municipality. The poultry industry was of some significance. The main crops were corn, soybeans, and wheat. In 2006 there were 887 farms employing around 3,600 workers, most of whom were relatives of the farm owner.

== Health and education ==
Passo Fundo is the third largest medical center in southern Brazil. The city has one of the largest and most modern radiology centers and radiation based at São Vicente de Paulo Hospital.

On the Human Development Index Passo Fundo was given .804 in 2000, ranking 149 out of 467 municipalities in the state and 478 out of 3,527 municipalities in the country. Life expectancy (male and female) was 68.5 and the literacy rate was 94%.

In 2005 there were 72 health establishments, of which 4 were hospitals providing 837 beds (69 public).

- Hospital Beneficente Dr. César Santos,

Endereço: Alcides Moura, 82 - Vila Popular

- Hospital da Cidade de Passo Fundo

Endereço: Tiradentes, 295 - Centro

- Hospital Prontoclínica LTDA

Endereço: Doutor Arthur Leite, 37 - Centro

- Hospital São Vicente de Paulo

Endereço: Teixeira Soares, 808 - Centro

In the educational sector there were 78 primary schools, 8 middle and secondary schools, and 53 pre-primary schools. In 2005 there were 5 institutes of higher education with around 12,000 students.

The schools of higher education are:

- Faculdade de tecnologia SENAC

Endereço: Sete de Setembro, 1045 - Centro Site:www.senacrs.com.br

- Faculdade Meridional

Endereço: Senador Pinheiro, 304 - Vila Cruzeiro Site:www.imed.edu.br

- Faplan

Endereço: Paissandu, 1200 - Centro Site:www.faplan.edu.br

- Portal Faculdades

Endereço: RS-153, 555 - Vila Nossa Senhora Aparecida Site:www.facportal.com.br

- UPF - Universidade de Passo Fundo

Endereço: BR-285, Km 171 - São José Site:www.upf.tche.br

== National renown ==
Passo Fundo is nicknamed "A Terra de Gente Boa", Portuguese for "The Land of Good People or Folks." The city is known as being one of the most gaúcho cities in all of Rio Grande do Sul. It is not uncommon to see gaúchos walking the streets of Passo Fundo dressed in their full pilcha or typical gaúcho costumes. It is also known by the country as the National Capital of Literature, according to the law nº 11.264, because of the many literary events and debates organized in the city, such as the National Journey of Literature and the highest readership in the country (6.5 books per year per inhabitant).

"Gaúcho de Passo Fundo"
from the album "O Gaúcho Coração do Rio Grande". Recorded by Teixeirinha in 1960, a resident of Passo Fundo.

== Notable people ==
Passo Fundo is the home town of football coach Luiz Felipe Scolari, and also of the philosopher, opera singer, poet and Germanic philologist Henrique García, and the adopted place of Teixeirinha, a Gaúcho folkloric performer, the modern gaúcho band Pala Velho, as well as it is known for being Pipe's birthplace. The city is the seat of the Roman Catholic Archdiocese of Passo Fundo, elevated from a Diocese in 2011. It is also home of supermodel Letícia Birkheuer and famous volleyball players and brothers Gustavo and Murilo Endres.

== In popular culture ==
- The city was mentioned in the 2002 M. Night Shyamalan science fiction-thriller Signs as the origin of a video from a child's birthday party, in which an image of an alien was captured.

== See also ==
- List of municipalities in Rio Grande do Sul
