= Gabriel Case =

Death of 18-year-old Gabriel Marques Cavalheiro

- Location: São Gabriel, Rio Grande do Sul, Brazil
- Date: August 12, 2022
- Attack type: Kidnapping, Homicide
- Deaths: 1
- Victim: Gabriel Marques Cavalheiro
- Defender: Ivandro Bitencourt Feijo (Cardoso) Vânia Barreto (Pedroso e Lima)
- Inquiry: Defendants arrested preventively and indicted for triple homicide
- Accused: Arleu Júnior Cardoso Raul Veras Pedroso Cléber Renato Ramos de Lima

The Gabriel Case refers to the death of young Gabriel Marques Cavalheiro, aged 18, on August 12, 2022, in the city of São Gabriel, in Rio Grande do Sul.

On September 5, 2022, the Public Ministry of Rio Grande do Sul (MPRS) denounced three military police officers for the crimes of homicide and concealment of the corpse. The complaint was accepted the next day.

== Biography ==
Gabriel, who had turned 18 on July 14, lived with his parents Anderson da Silva Cavalheiro and Rosane Machado Marques in Guaíba, in the Metropolitan Region of Porto Alegre. According to the Diário de Santa Maria, he was a member of the CTG Gomes Jardim and liked the traditionalist music of the artist Baitaca. He was known in the neighborhood where he lived for liking to play pool and at home he used to watch criminal investigation series. The young man ended up moving to São Gabriel to do military service in a barracks with cavalry, since he was very fond of horses. "He wanted to fulfill his dream of performing compulsory military service in São Gabriel, as well as living in the city where, since he was a child, he spent his holidays and where, in the company of uncles and cousins, he learned to ride a horse and enjoy the tasks of the field. ", reported the Diário de Santa Maria as well.

Maria da Graça Medeiros da Silva, director of Colégio Estadual Cônego Scherer, the last school he had attended, said when she learned of his death: "he was a happy boy, a friend and, as his classmates say: the pillar of the class. present at school, always concerned about his education. He was a student with a good heart who left good memories and misses him a lot. May justice be done".

== Disappearance ==
On August 12, around midnight, Gabriel tried to enter through the gate of a house in the neighborhood where he lived with his relatives in São Gabriel, but as the resident did not know him because he was new in town, he called the Brigade. Military. According to collected data, he would have been in a bar before, where he had consumed alcoholic beverages. The police officers approached him, but had difficulty in containing him, and everything was recorded by the resident through her cell phone, until the moment he was taken behind the car and placed in the vehicle. After that, the young man was not seen again until August 19, when his body was found in a reservoir in Lava Pé, São Gabriel.

The toxicological examination indicated a high level of alcohol in the body (23.4 decigrams per liter of blood), but according to the expert in charge, there is no way to say how much of this would be the result of drinking and how much would be due to the body's decomposition process.

== Investigations ==
With the family members registering the disappearance, the Civil Police began investigations and, when analyzing the camera images, saw that the vehicle had gone towards Lava Pé around 00:05. At 0:11 am, the vehicle was spotted returning from the region and the police arrived at the headquarters of the Military Brigade at 0:18 am.

When identified, the military police were heard, but denied that they knew anything. Days later, the testimonies were changed and they reported that they had left Gabriel in Lava Pé at the request of the victim.

Investigators, with the help of firefighters, searched a dam at the site and found Gabriel's body on August 19.

=== Autopsy ===
The necropsy indicated that Gabriel died due to an injury at the cervical level that caused internal bleeding, leading to his death. "The report (...) reinforces what two witnesses had said in their testimony, that the victim would have been the target of three blows to the head with a truncheon", reported Diário de Santa Maria on August 29, adding that "the necropsy also indicated that Gabriel was already dead before he was placed in the weir".

== Arrest and trial ==
Soldiers Raul Veras Pedroso and Cléber Renato Ramos de Lima and Second Sergeant Arleu Júnior Cardoso were arrested on August 19 and are awaiting trial at the Military Police Prison, in Porto Alegre.

On August 29, they were indicted in a military investigation for aggravated homicide, concealment of a corpse and ideological falsehood.

In early September, the three defendants tried to impute the crime to a former prisoner, Elton Luis Rossato Gabi, who came to assume the crime and was arrested. However, he later changed his version when he testified in the presence of a public defender. According to Gabi, police had invaded his home and coerced him, under violence, to assume the crime. The delegate responsible for the case said that the version told by the ex-convict never made sense.
