= Brazilian gaucho music =

Music genre

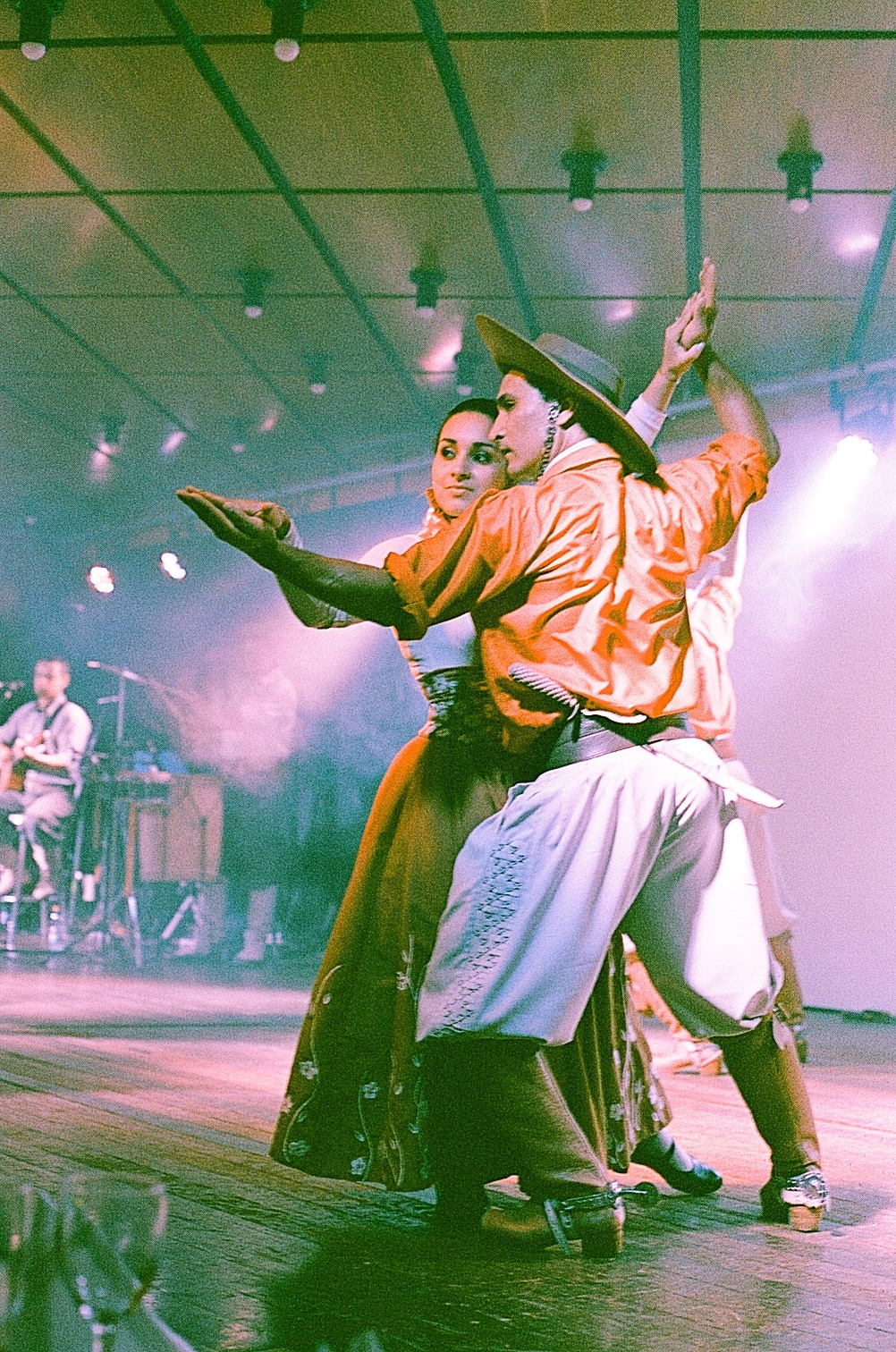
- Native name: Música gaúcha, música gaúcha brasileira, música nativista
- Other names: Nativist gaucho music
- Cultural origins: Portugal, Spanish, Africa and from Indigenous peoples
- Typical instruments: Accordion, Guitar, Bass, Drums, Violin and bombo legüero

Regional scenes
- Rio Grande do Sul, Santa Catarina

Brazilian gaucho music (in Portuguese música gaúcha brasileira or música nativista) denotes the traditional music of Río Grande do Sul, Santa Catarina and Paraná states, whose population has a strong ancestry of European countries like Portugal, Spain, Italy and Germany. The word gaucho refers to the countryside and farm people.

== History ==
In the 19th century, in the north of the state of Rio Grande do Sul, Brazil, the tropeiros, men who led the cattle troops, often created music for fun, to sing while they stumbled, they were songs with simple lyrics, but with time, and the arrival of the accordion in Brazil, these songs gained their own dances. Today, they are gaúcho folkloric songs and dances, as there is no record of the composers of the songs and the creators of the dances.

With the emergence of the Farroupilha Revolution, also known as the Farrapos War, these dances ended up being forgotten for years, receiving only a brief revival in late nineteenth century's parties. In 1940, the folklorist João Carlos D'avila Paixão Cõrtes, better known as Paixão Côrtes, Gathered a group of friends to rescue these songs and dances, and through a lot of work, they got many answers from elderly people. In 1943, the first song from Rio Grande do Sul was recorded: it is called "Adeus Mariana", performed by singer and composer Pedro Raymundo, and was inspired by country music. In 1948, after further research, Paixão Côrtes and his friends created the first Centro de Tradições Gaúchas (known throughout Brazil through the acronym "CTG"), where people gather for traditional events, involving music and dance. At this point many folk songs were rescued, and in 1950, the first folk music from Rio Grande do Sul was recorded, "Rancheira de Carreirinha", recorded by Ivan Lessa.

Each folk song has its dance, as they were forgotten for years, when they were rescued by Paixão Cõrtes and his friends, many dances needed to receive small modifications to help people memorize the steps.

In 1958 with the foundation of CTG Rincão Serrano in Carazinho RS, these customs were already very popular in the state of Rio Grande do Sul and it was already arriving in the state of Santa Catarina, not only music and dance, but also clothing, as well. like the gaucho of Uruguay, the clothing of the gaucho of Brazil is similar, Bombacha (Pants), boots, scarf around the neck, hat and on cold days, the use of the poncho or the visor are two similar garments that are suitable for winter .

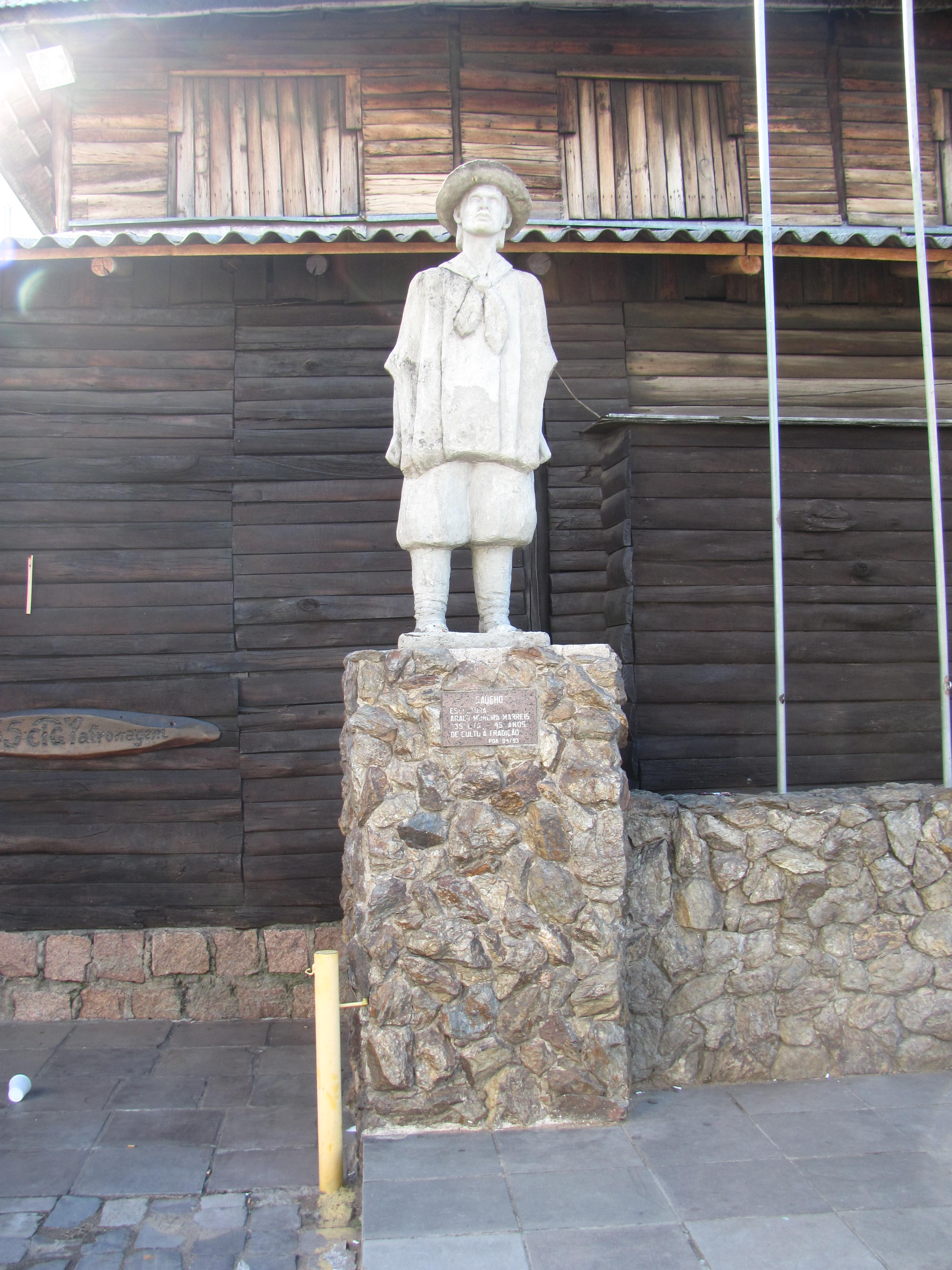
Gaúcho statue in C.T.G. 35 (Center of Gaucho Traditions), the first C.T.G. in history

The songs of the gaucho music present themes from the gaucho folk traditions, such as: countryside, farm, horse, moral values and regional cuisine. Some songs are built in a slow way, others in a more agitated way, always following the familiar rhythms, Xote, Valsa and Milonga are slow rhythms, Chamamé, Vaneira and Bugio are more agitated.

Having the influence of folk music, by singer Pedro Raymundo, and the duo Irmãos Bertussi, several gaúcho artists emerged singing their own songs in the same style. Gaucho music follows various rhythms, Waltz, Tango, Rancheira, Vaneira, Chamamé, Xote, and the only rhythm created in Rio Grande do Sul, the Bugio. The folk songs also follow these rhythms, the "Xote Carreirinho" as the title says, is in the rhythm of Xote, the "Pezinho" is in the Ritmo de Valsa and the "Rancheira de Carreirinha" is a Rancheira as the title itself it says.

Gaucho music became popular worldwide in 1960 as singer and composer Teixeirinha, born in Rolante, Rio Grande do Sul, Teixeirinha released the song "Coração de Luto" in 1959, the song talks about his childhood, in 1960 it sold 1 million of copies in South America and Portugal, until 1965 it had sold 3 million copies throughout America, Europe and some countries in Africa and Asia. Today Teixeirinha is considered the greatest singer from Rio Grande do Sul and regionalist, with more than 130 million albums sold worldwide.

Gaucho music stands out a lot in ballads, where two or more singers get together and sing rhymed verses in the improvisation, attacking each other, a musical fight made to amuse the people, two singers stand out in the gaucho trova, Gildo de Freitas and José Portella Delavy, Gildo de Freitas is considered the King of the Troubadours, and Delavy is considered the Master of the Troubadours. Currently, a great grandson of Delavy named Samuel Delavy is pursuing a career in Rock.

In addition to Teixeirinha, Gildo de Freitas and José Portella Delavy, other great artists and bands stand out such as Baitaca, Porca Véia, Os Bertussi (band created by the Bertussi Brothers after their success as a duo), Mano Lima, Mary Terezinha, Berenice Azambuja, Shana Muller and others.

Some of the musical instruments used in the genre are accordion, guitar, violin and bombo legüero.

== Festivals ==
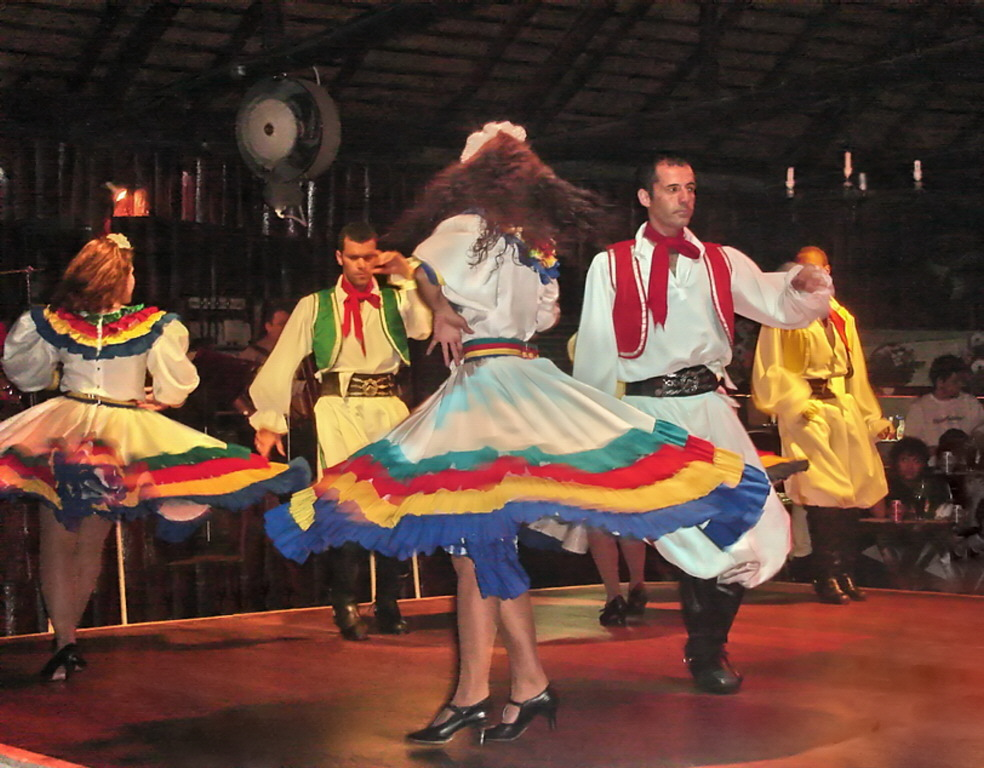
Photo of a traditionalist gaucho dance.

As of 1971, the California da Canção Nativa appeared in Uruguaiana, a festival considered to be the mother of all nativist festivals, giving rise to nativist music festivals in the states of Santa Catarina, Paraná and Rio Grande do Sul.

After the California of Native Song emerged:

- Escaramuça da Canção Gaudéria
- Seara da Canção Nativista
- Ponche Verde da canção Gaúcha
- Tertúlia Musical Nativista
- Festival da Barranca
- Coxilha Nativista
- Musicanto Sul-americano de Nativismo
- Tafona da Canção Nativa
- Acorde da Canção Nativa
- Sapecada da Canção Nativa
- Um Canto para Martín Fierro
- Gauderiada da Canção Gaúcha
- Encontro Internacional de Chamameceros
- Carijo da Canção Gaúcha
- Salamanca da Canção Nativa
- Canoa do Canto Nativo
- Acampamento da Canção Nativa
- Galponeira
- Serra, Campo e Cantiga
- Bicuíra da Canção Nativa

== Most popular artists ==
- Teixeirinha
- Gildo de Freitas
- José Portella Delavy
- Baitaca
- Pedro Ortaça
- Formiguinha
- Pedro Raymundo
- José Mendes
- Gaúcho da Fronteira
- Porca Véia
- Mary Terezinha
- Shana Muller
- Mano Lima
- Teixeirinha Filho
- Teixeirinha Neto
- Leonardo
- Leopoldo Raisser
- Luiz Marenco
- Cerejinha
- Bruna Scopel
- Augusto Camargo
- Velho Milongueiro
- Luiz Marenco
- Adelar Bertussi
- Gilnei Bertussi
- Paulinho Mixaria
- João Luiz Corrêa
- Joca Martins
- Luiz Carlos Borges
- Marcelo do Tchê

== Most Popular Bands and Duos ==
- Teixeirinha and Mary Terezinha
- Os Serranos
- Os Bertussi
- Os Farrapos
- As Maragatas
- Os Monarcas
- Os Mirins
- Zézinho e Julieta
- Gauchinhas Missioneiras
- Grupo Minuano
- Grupo Soledade
- Buenas Tchê
- Gauchinhas Missioneiras
- Conjunto Fogo de Chão
- Garotas do Tchê
- Garotos de Ouro
- Tchê Garotos
- Antônio Gringo e os Quatro Ventos
- Os Milongueiros
- Nelson e Janete
- Oswaldir e Carlos Magrão
- Grupo Rodeio
- César Oliveira e Rogério Melo
- Grupo Tradição
- Os Mateadores
- Machado e Marcelo do Tchê
- Tchê Guri
- Tchê Barbaridade

== Music Symbols Gauchos ==
Gaucho music is the musical style that has the most successes considered symbols in Brazil, several artists stand out for their successes and many of the successes fall in people's admiration, as is the case of the song "Querência Amada" by singer Teixeirinha, released in 1975, until today is considered the second anthem of the state of Rio Grande do Sul, the song talks about the singer's admiration for the gaucho tradition, situating important people in the history of Brazil, people who were born in Rio Grande do Sul, like the former president Getúlio Vargas, the lawyer Borges de Medeiros and the lawyer Flores da Cunha, in addition to quoting the beauties of Rio Grande do Sul in a poetical way that stirred the emotions of millions of people across the country, thanks to Teixeirinha, the culture Gaucho is appreciated throughout Brazil, even in states with different cultures, the Gauchos are remembered.

Another success considered a symbol of gaucho music, and also a state anthem, is the song "Céu, Sol, Sul, Terra e Cor" by singer and composer Jader Moreci Teixeira, better known as Leonardo Gaucho, the song talks about the beauties of the state and values of the people of Rio Grande do Sul, talking about God as well.

Other songs stand out as a symbol for talking about the people of Rio Grande do Sul, their customs and values, such as "Do Fundo da Grota" by singer Baitaca, "Desasssegos" by singer João Chagas Leite, "Eu Reconheço eu Sou um Grosso" by singer Gildo de Freitas and others.
