= Lucas Wingert =

Brazilian footballer (born 1999)

Personal information
- Full name: Lucas Leandro Wingert
- Date of birth: 4 May 1999 (age 27)
- Place of birth: Rolante, Brazil
- Height: 2.00 m (6 ft 7 in)
- Position: Goalkeeper

Team information
- Current team: Ituano

Youth career
- Internacional

Senior career*
Years	Team	Apps	(Gls)
2020–2021	Internacional	0	(0)
2020	→ Grêmio Prudente (loan)	1	(0)
2021	→ Paraná (loan)	1	(0)
2022	→ Grêmio Prudente (loan)	6	(0)
2022	Paraná	8	(0)
2022	Portuguesa	0	(0)
2023–2024	Juventude	10	(0)
2025	Operário Ferroviário	0	(0)
2026–	Ituano	25	(0)
- * Club domestic league appearances and goals as of 11 November 2026

Lucas Leandro Wingert (born 4 May 1999) is a Brazilian footballer who plays as a goalkeeper for Ituano.

== Career ==
Born in Rolante, Rio Grande do Sul, Wingert began his career with Internacional. On 11 August 2020, after finishing his formation, he was announced on loan at Grêmio Prudente for the year's Campeonato Paulista Segunda Divisão.

After featuring in just one match, Wingert moved to Paraná also on loan on 16 February 2021. After again only appearing once, he returned to Grêmio Prudente on 2 August, again on loan.

On 19 January 2022, Wingert returned to Paraná, now on a permanent deal. On 26 August, he signed for Portuguesa.

On 5 December 2022, Wingert agreed to a one-year contract with Juventude. On 13 September 2023, despite only playing with a B-team in the Copa FGF, he renewed his contract until April 2025.

== Career statistics ==
As of 19 February 2024.

Club	Season	League			State League		Cup		Continental		Other		Total	
Club	Season	Division	Apps	Goals	Apps	Goals	Apps	Goals	Apps	Goals	Apps	Goals	Apps	Goals
Grêmio Prudente	2020	Paulista 2ª Divisão	—		1	0	—		—		—		1	0
Paraná	2021	Série C	0	0	1	0	—		—		—		1	0
Grêmio Prudente	2021	Paulista 2ª Divisão	—		6	0	—		—		—		6	0
Paraná	2022	Série D	2	0	6	0	—		—		—		8	0
Portuguesa	2022	Paulista A2	—		—		—		—		0	0	0	0
Juventude	2023	Série B	0	0	0	0	0	0	—		6 (Note: Appearance(s) in Copa FGF)	0	6	0
Juventude	2024	Série A	0	0	7	0	0	0	—		—		7	0
Juventude	Total		0	0	7	0	0	0	—		6	0	13	0
Career total			2	0	20	0	0	0	0	0	6	0	28	0
