= Pala Velho =

- Origin: Passo Fundo, Rio Grande do Sul, Brazil
- Genres: Modern Folkloric Gaucho Music (Tchê Music)
- Years active: 1995–2006
- Labels: ACIT, USA Discos
- Members: Marcelo Dametto, Marquinhos, Cristiano Basso, Joelson Godinho e Juninho

"Gaúcho Eu Sou"
from the album "Sou Rio Grande". Recorded in 1998 by Pala Velho.

Pala Velho was a "tchê music" band (a modern version of traditional folkloric Brazilian gaucho music) from Passo Fundo, Rio Grande do Sul, Brazil.

The band started out in the mid 1990s and became very popular throughout Rio Grande do Sul competing with bands in the same genre such as Tchê Barbaridade. The band briefly became successful nationally and appeared on national television. To broaden their appeal, they reworked their music to be more pop-oriented and not have as much of a gaucho sound from instruments such as the accordion. The band also changed their style by wearing normal street clothing on their album covers instead of traditional gaucho garb. The band continued to exist in the early 2000s with some new members and the original lead singer/song writer, but soon disbanded in the middle of the decade.

The band recorded under the ACIT label and later the USA Discos label, but despite their past popularity are no longer mentioned on either labels' web site.

They also participated in other works, among them the CD "Tchê Music - Live" in 1999, a merger of Acit with Abril and also the DVD "Festa Gaúcha" in 2003 by USA Discos, their first and only appearance on a DVD.

Main successes:

- Buenas Tchê (1996)

- Vanera do Coração (1996)

- Louco Pra Ti Ver (1996)

- Sou Rio Grande (1998)

- Gaúcho Eu Sou (1998)

- Primeiro Amor (1998)

- Orgulho de Gaúcho (1998)

- Apenas Uma Madrugada (2000)

- Morena (2000)

- Dançando a Vanera (2000)

- Na Batida da Vanera (2003)

- O Bicho Vai Pegar (2003)

- Eu Te Amo (2003)

- Cara a Cara (2006)

- Por Nada (2006)

- Pior é Te Perder (2006)

Original band members:

- Marcelo Dametto (lead singer, main song writer)
- Marquinhos (guitar and vocals)
- Juninho (drums)
- Cristiano Basso (bass, vocals)
- Joelson Godinho (accordion)

Former Members:

- Wagner Gehlen (accordion)
- Luciano Gradaschi (guitar and vocals)
- Frederico Tisot (harmonica, guitar and percussion)
- Bernardo Tisot (drums)

Selected discography:

- Buenas Tchê (1996) - Acit
- Sou Rio Grande (1998) - Acit
- Dançando a Vanera (2000) - Acit
- Os 16 Grandes Sucessos do Grupo Pala Velho (2003) - Acit
- Na Batida da Vanera (2003) - USA Discs
- Cara a Cara (2006) - Independente
