= José Portella Delavy =

"Mestre dos Trovadores" José Portella Delavy
- Born: José Portella Delavy; 9 March 1930; Triunfo, Rio Grande do Sul, Brazil
- Origin: Brazil
- Died: 28 May 2011 (aged 81) Alvorada, Rio Grande do Sul, Brazil
- Genres: Brazilian gaucho music
- Occupations: Singer, composer and troubadour
- Instruments: Guitar
- Years active: 1965–2011
- Labels: Nikita Music

José Portella Delavy (9 March 1930 – 28 May 2011) was a Brazilian singer and composer known for composing the song "Para Pedro" with José Mendes. The song is an exemplar of Brazilian gaucho music.

== Early life ==
Delavy was born in Triunfo, in the state of Rio Grande do Sul, south of Brazil, on March 9, 1930. At the age of 17, he moved to Alvorada, in Greater Porto Alegre, where he was elected city councilor, a position he held between 1977 and 1989.

== Career ==
In 1966, he began working at the radio station Farroupilha in Porto Alegre on the program Grande Rodeio Coringa where he met singer José Mendes.

Delavy and Mendes began performing together, visiting many cities within the state. On one of these trips in 1967, their car broke down and they had to take a bus. Along the way, they overheard two other travelers arguing, saying: "Para Pedro, Para Pedro". The phrase inspired their first hit, "Pára Pedro," first broadcast on Grande Rodeio Coringa, and later recorded by Mendes, whose version became a national success.

In 1970, he made the xote "Contando a Verdade" with Elmo Neher and Bruno Neher, recorded by the Três Xirus, on the LP Espetacular, on the Copacabana label. Shortly after, the composition "Decision de amor", with Adelino Duarte, was recorded by Dupla Mirim, on the LP Outra Barbaridade" on Sabiá/Copacabana. In 1983, the vanera "Gineteada no Uruguai", with Ademar Silva, was recorded by Ademar Silva on the LP Galpão Crioulo, a compilation that brought artists together on an album released by Som Livre. In 1986, the song "Para Pedro!" was re-recorded by the duo Kleiton and Kledir from Rio Grande do Sul.

In the same year, Delavy composed the song "Mulher Valente", recorded by Zézinho and Julieta. The 1970s and 1980s were marked by the ballads in which Delavy participated. He was considered a master troubadour, performing with gaucho artists such as Teixeirinha and Gildo de Freitas.

The troubadour was part of the golden generation of the trova of Rio Grande do Sul, alongside Teixeirinha, Tereco, Luiz Muller, Garoto de Ouro, and Francisco Vargas.

=== Death ===
Delavy died on May 28, 2011. He had diabetes and was hospitalized in the Alvorada Hospital, in Alvorada, Greater Porto Alegre.

== Personal life ==
In 1950, José Portella Delavy married Iodete Chaves and had a son, two grandchildren, and three great-grandchildren.

== Works ==
- 1967 – "Pára Pedro" (With José Mendes
- 1970 – "Contando a Verdade" (With Elmo Neher and Bruno Neher)
- 1970 – "Mulher Valente"
- 1970 – "Decisão de Amor" (With Adelino Duarte)
- 1970 – "Gineteada no Uruguai" (With Ademar Silva)
- 1975 – "Gaiteiro Amigo"
- 1976 – "Balanço do Destino"
- 1978 – "Peito Vazio"
- 1980 – "Relembrando o Xote"
- 1988 – "Qual é o Teiu CTG"'

== Discography ==
Delavy did not release albums in his career. However, he worked on solo compositions, which were purchased and recorded by local artists, and he composed with artist friends.

Delavy cowrote ballads that were recorded on multiple albums. The most famous was between him and Moraezinho, which was recorded on the album Mensagem Final, an album in honor of Gildo de Freitas.

=== Trovas ===
- 1964 – Trova (José Portella Delavy and Gildo de Freitas)
- 1972 – Trova (José Portella Delavy and Formiguinha)
- 1977 – Trova (José Portella Delavy and Moraezinho)
- 1980 – Trova de Campeões
- 1984 – Trova (José Portella Delavy and Luiz Muller)
- 1986 – Uma baita Trova!
- 1988 – Trova (José Portella Delavy and Tchê Fagundes)
- 1995 – Trova (José Portella Delavy and Francisco Vargas)
- 2002 – Trova (José Portella Delavy and Valdomiro Mello)
- 2003 – Trova (José Portella Delavy and Valdomiro Mello)
- 2010 – Trova (José Portella Delavy and Moraezinho) (Rodeio Gildo de Freitas)

== Hit songs ==
- "Pára Pedro"
- "Mulher Valente"
- "Gineteada no Uruguai"
- "Contando a Verdade"

== See also ==
- Brazilian gaucho music
- Teixeirinha
