= Ituano FC =

Brazilian football club in Itu, São Paulo

Ituano
- Full name: Ituano Futebol Clube
- Nicknames: Galo de Itu (The Rooster of Itu); Galo Rubro-Negro (The Red & Black Rooster); Gigante Guerreiro (Giant Warrior); Ferroviário (The Railroader); Marechal de Ferro (Marshall of the Rails)
- Founded: 24 May 1947; 79 years ago
- Ground: Novelli Júnior
- Capacity: 18,560
- President: Vinicius Guitti Moraes
- Head coach: Alberto Valentim
- League: Campeonato Brasileiro Série C Campeonato Paulista Série A2
- 2025 2025: Série C, 12th of 20; Paulista Série A2, 3rd of 16
- Website: www.ituanofc.com
Home colours	Away colours

Ituano Futebol Clube, commonly referred to as simply Ituano, is a Brazilian association football club in Itu, São Paulo. They currently play in the Série C, the third tier of Brazilian football, as well as in the Campeonato Paulista Série A2, the second tier of the São Paulo state football league.

Founded on May 24, 1947, Ituano won the São Paulo State League twice.

The club's home colours are red and black and the team mascot is a rooster.

== History ==
The club was founded on May 24, 1947, by employees of Estrada de Ferro Sorocabana (Sorocabana Railroad), based in Itu. When founded the club was originally known as Associação Atlética Sorocabana. In the 1960s, the club changed its name to Ferroviário Atlético Ituano and in the 1990s the club again changed its name, this time to Ituano Futebol Clube.

In 1977 a group of sportsmen of Itu unified the football of the city around Ferroviário Atlético Ituano (FAI) and reactivated the Liga Ituana de Futebol (Ituano Football League). In 1978 the club played in Série A3 the third level of the São Paulo state professional football championship. They were promoted to the Campeonato Paulista, the top-flight professional football league in São Paulo in 1989 after clinching the Série A2 championship.

In 2002, Ituano became one of the few teams from outside the São Paulo metroplex area to win the Campeonato Paulista.

In 2003, Ituano became the champion of the Campeonato Brasileiro Série C after surpassing teams like Santo Andre who won the Copa Do Brasil one year later.

In 2007, Ituano were relegated back to the Brasileiro Serie C after finishing in last place and one year later were not playing in the Brazilian top 4 divisions.

In 2014, Ituano became one of the few teams outside of the São Paulo metroplex area to win the Campeonato Paulista twice beating Santos in the final.

Juninho Paulista, a former player from the club's academy and former Brazilian international, became the club's president in 2010. Juninho joined in a player-president capacity helping the team avoid relegation on the final day of the 2010 season with the decisive goal in a 3–2 victory.

In 2014, Ituano won the Campeonato Paulista, defeating the storied Santos Futebol Clube on penalty kicks.

In 2019, Arsenal signed young winger Gabriel Martinelli from the club and he quickly became a first-team regular.

== Stadium ==
Ituano's stadium is Estádio Novelli Júnior, inaugurated in 1947. The stadium has a capacity of 18,000 people.

== Mascot ==
The club mascot is a rooster wearing the team kit. The nickname was received in 1957 when Sorocabana played against Club Atlético Ituano (Third Division champions in 1954–55, who have no connection with the current Ituano FC). On this occasion Sorocabana lost the match but the supporters said that the team had fought like a cock and from there the club received its nickname.

== Rivalries ==
Ituano's biggest rival is Paulista Futebol Clube and they contest the Briga de Galo. Other major rivals are Ponte Preta and São Bento, representing the cities of Campinas and Sorocaba, respectively.

== Players ==
=== Current squad ===
As of 1 September 2026

Note: Flags indicate national team as defined under FIFA eligibility rules; some limited exceptions apply. Players may hold more than one non-FIFA nationality.

No.	Pos.	Nation	Player
—	GK	BRA	Lucas Wingert
—	GK	BRA	Saulo
—	GK	BRA	Wesley
—	DF	BRA	Lucas Dias
—	DF	BRA	Matheus Mancini
—	DF	BRA	Léo Coltro
—	DF	BRA	Leandro Sergipe
—	DF	BRA	Richard
—	DF	BRA	Guilherme Dal Pian
—	DF	BRA	Thassio
—	DF	BRA	Lucas Mota
—	MF	BRA	Guilherme Xavier
—	MF	BRA	Marthã
—	MF	BRA	Lipe

No.	Pos.	Nation	Player
—	MF	BRA	Nelsinho
—	MF	BRA	Fernando Canesin
—	MF	BRA	Lucas Stefanello
—	MF	BRA	Victor Silva
—	MF	BRA	Felipe Muranga
—	FW	BRA	Léo Passos
—	FW	BRA	Neto Berola
—	FW	BRA	Bruno Alves
—	FW	BRA	Marlinho
—	FW	BRA	Alason Carioca
—	FW	BRA	Bruno Mezenga
—	FW	BRA	Gabriel Razera
—	FW	BRA	Luan

=== Youth team ===
Note: Flags indicate national team as defined under FIFA eligibility rules; some limited exceptions apply. Players may hold more than one non-FIFA nationality.

No. / Pos. / Nation / Player; — / DF / BRA / Matheus Rocha	No. / Pos. / Nation / Player

=== Out on loan ===
Note: Flags indicate national team as defined under FIFA eligibility rules; some limited exceptions apply. Players may hold more than one non-FIFA nationality.

No. / Pos. / Nation / Player; — / FW / BRA / Zé Carlos (at Cascavel until 30 November 2026)	No. / Pos. / Nation / Player

== Honours ==
=== Official tournaments ===
National
Competitions	Titles	Seasons
Campeonato Brasileiro Série C	2	2003, 2021
State
Competitions	Titles	Seasons
Campeonato Paulista	2	2002, 2014
Copa Mauro Ramos	1	2002
Campeonato Paulista Série A2	1	1989

=== Others tournaments ===
==== State ====
- Campeonato Paulista do Interior (2): 2017, 2022

=== Runners-up ===
- Copa Paulista (3): 1999, 2003, 2015
- Campeonato Paulista Série A2 (1): 1997
