= Coração de Luto =

Song by Teixeirinha
- English title: mourning heart
- Written: 1959
- Recorded: Warner Music Group
- Genre: MPB
- Songwriter: Vitor Mateus Teixeira
- Composer: Vitor Mateus Teixeira
- Producer: Biaggio Baccarin

"Coração de Luto" is a song composed by the Brazilian singer and composer Teixeirinha, the song was recorded by him in 1959 and in 1960 it sold 1 million copies, an unprecedented event in the history of music, since at that time no other artist had sold 1 million copies from a single-song album, to this day "Coração de Luto" is one of the most played songs in Brazil.

== History ==
The autobiographical lyrics of the song describe Teixeirinha's sad childhood, and speak mainly of the tragic death of his mother, Ledurina Mateus, who, suffering from epilepsy, fainted over a fire, made by her to burn dry leaves and branches, dying burned in the courtyard of the house.

Teixeirinha composed the song in 1959, with the objective of showing the public what happened in his childhood and also showing the importance of a mother in people's lives.

== Curiosities ==
Because of the lyrics of this song, television presenter Flávio Cavalcanti said that Teixeirinha was making a success at his mother's expense, and renamed the song, pejoratively, Churrasquinho de Mãe ("Mother Barbecue"). The problem is that this new name ended up sticking, and many even think that, in fact, the song is called Churrasquinho de Mãe. On Marília Gabriela's program, for example, the presenter asked the suffering composer: "What's this about barbecues ?" Afflicted by a violent attack of crying, Teixeirinha could barely manage to mumble an explanation for the dubious joke, while the interviewer cowered in shame on the famous sofa.

Currently, the single "Coração de Luto" has sold exactly 25 million copies worldwide, being one of the most played songs in Europe in the 1960s, in 1977 Teixeirinha recorded a version with a new instrumental.

== Awards ==
- 1960 – Gold Record (Single)
- 1961 – Gold Record (Album)
- 1961 – Chantecler Records Trophy for high sales figures
- 1962 – Trophy for 2 million copies sold.
- 1962 – Diamond Disk (Album)
- 2014 – Azorean music trophy
- 2015 – Azorean music trophy

== See also ==
- Teixeirinha
- Brazilian gaucho music
