= Tche music =

Music genre based on traditional music from Rio Grande do Sul, Brazil

Tchê music
- Other names: Chê music
- Stylistic origins: Bahian music; Chorinho; Pagode; Samba; Chamamé; Vaneira; Xote
- Cultural origins: Rio Grande do Sul

Tchê music or chê music is a variation of the traditional music style from the most southern state of Brazil, Rio Grande do Sul. It incorporates elements from Bahian music (north-east), of the Chorinho (ancient Brazilian style), the Pagode (a variation of Samba), the Samba itself is also used, folk and dance music, to the most common musical rhythms of Rio Grande do Sul, like the Chamamé, Vaneira and Xote.

== Overview ==
This musical style is considered modern for the Rio Grande do Sul's tradition cultivators because in the Tchê Music equipments were incorporated to modernize the rural music, like percussion, drums, electric guitar and DJs.

The Tchê Music is represented mainly by the musical groups Tchê Barbaridade, who began the "Tchê Era", Tchê Garotos and Tchê Guri. Tchê Barbaridade started in the end of the 80s, Tchê Guri in the beginning of the 90s and Tchê Garotos was launched in 1995.

In the middle of 2006, the people of the Traditionalist Movement from Rio Grande do Sul (MTG) prohibited the musicians of Tchê Music to use pilcha (traditional Guacho clothes, buts, bombacha, guaiaca), because they didn't find it a legitimate cultural representation from Rio Grande do Sul. They consider that Tchê Music bands are altering the rhythm of the music from the state and its traditional garment. For the MTG, the principal preoccupation is the devaluation of the tradition, which should be above the financial values, or it would lose its finality.

With this kinds of prohibition, the components of the Tchê Music have united and founded the Tchê Brasil Movement (MTB), in defense of Tchê Music, and created specific places for this style, as well as the CTGs are for the rural music from Rio Grande do Sul.
