= Baitaca =

Baitaca Antônio César Pereira Jacques
- Also known as: Baitaca; Baita
- Born: December 23, 1965 (age 59); São Luiz Gonzaga, Rio Grande do Sul, Brazil
- Origin: Rio Grande do Sul, Southern Brazil, Brazil
- Genres: Brazilian gaucho music; latin music
- Occupations: Singer; songwriter; accordionist; multi-instrumentalist
- Instruments: Voice; accordion; acoustic guitar
- Years active: 1997–present
- Labels: Usadiscos; ACIT; Vozes; Vertical
- Website: Official YouTube channel

Baitaca, artistic name of Antônio César Pereira Jacques (born December 23, 1965), is a Brazilian singer and songwriter known for his traditional "gaúcho" music style. In his compositions, some lyrics carry double meanings and tell stories about life in rural settings. He experienced a resurgence in 2019 with the song "Do Fundo da Grota," which gained popularity through live performances by singers during the 2020 pandemic. His repertoire includes other hits like "A História do Tico Loco," "Baitaca Com Seu Jeito Simples," and "Querido Encanta a Todos."

== Biography ==
Baitaca was born in the locality of Rincão dos Pintos, in the countryside of São Luiz Gonzaga. He inherited the nickname from his grandfather, whose name refers to the "maitaca," a bird from the parrot family. At the age of 14, he won first place in a trova competition in the children's category at CTG Sinos in São Miguel das Missões. He started working as a ranch hand, and in his spare time, he composed and sang songs. While in Porto Alegre, he worked as a construction laborer, composing trovas while working with his boss at the time, Paulo Alves (Paulinho). In 1996, at the age of 31, he made his first recording on a cassette tape, and the following year, he released his first album: "Destrinchando o Bagualismo." He became well known for songs like "História do Tico Loco" and "Do fundo da grota." In 2014, he was honored by the City Council of Vacaria, which awarded him the "Troféu Candeeiro Farrapo." In 2022, Baitaca receives the "Medal of Farroupilha Merit" (Portuguese: Medalha do Mérito Farroupilha) by the Legislative Assembly of Rio Grande do Sul.

== Discography ==
=== Studio albums ===
- 1997 – Destrinchando o Bagualismo
- 2001 – História do Tico Louco
- 2001 – Rodeio Campeiro • USA Discos
- 2002 – Meu Rio Grande é Deste Jeito (Volume 2) • Gravadora Vozes
- 2003 – Vida de Campeiro • USA Discos
- 2006 – Bailanta da Boneca • USA Discos
- 2008 – Baitaca Canta Francisco Vargas • USA Discos
- 2009 – Marca de Campo • ACIT
- 2010 – Estampa de Galpão • Gravadora Vozes
- 2012 – Da Doma Pro Rodeio • Gravadora Vozes
- 2013 - Campeiro Não Tem Enfeite • ACIT
- 2016 – De Campeiro Pra Campeiro • Vertical Records
- 2020 – Galponeiro e Aporreado • Lead Studio

=== Live albums ===
- 2007 – Baitaca – Ao Vivo • USA Discos

=== Compilations ===
- 2005 – Para Sempre Sucessos
- 2014 – O Melhor do Baitaca (Volume 1) • Gravadora Vozes

=== DVDs ===
- 2010 – Reformando a Mulher Véia • USA Discos
- 2012 – Do Fundo da Grota • USA Discos
