= Luiz Marenco =

Brazilian folk musician and composer (born 1964)

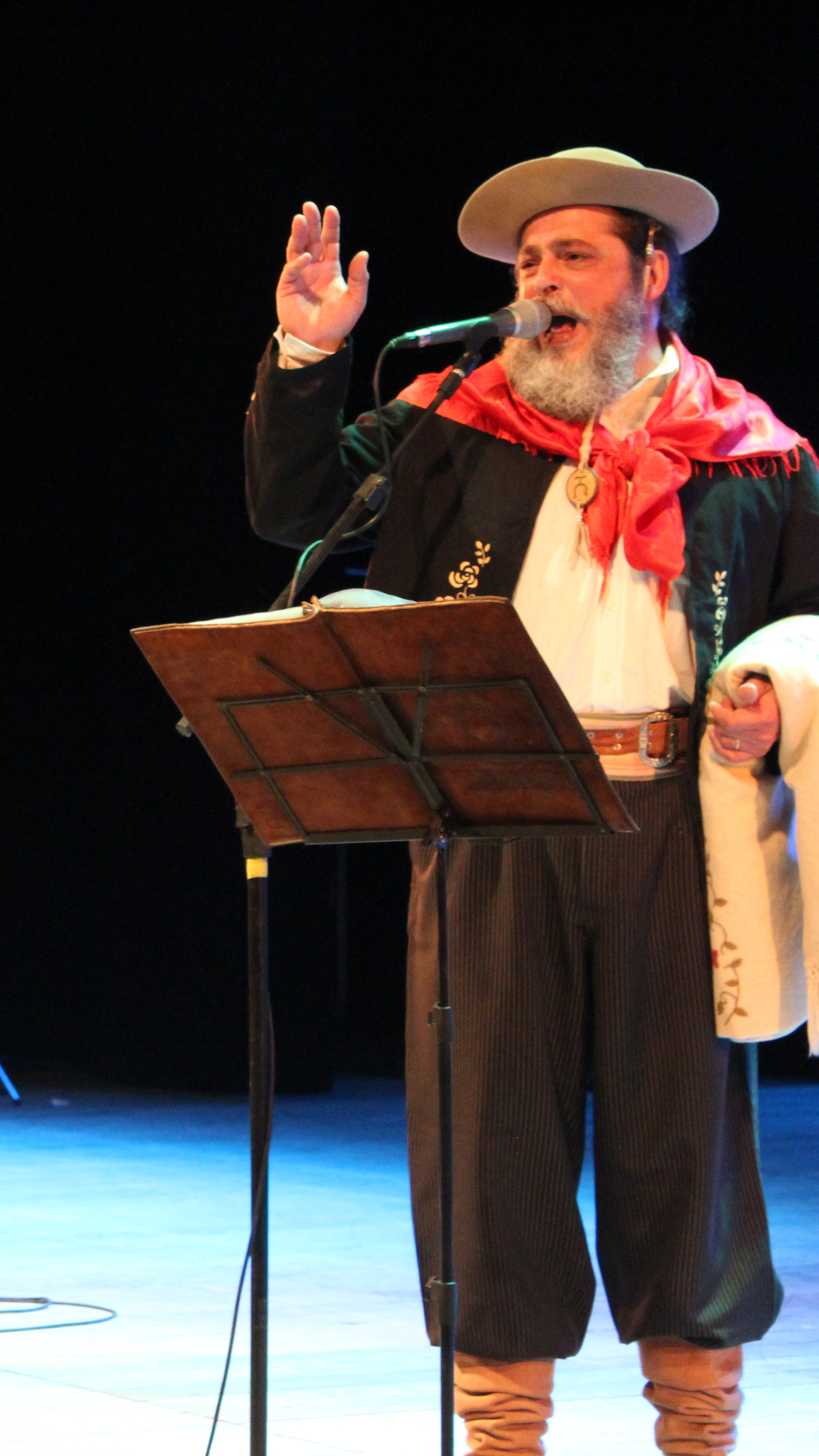
Luiz Marenco

Luiz Marenco (born December 22, 1964, in Porto Alegre) is a Brazilian folk musician and composer.

== Discography ==
- Luiz Marenco Canta Jayme Caetano Braun (1991)
- Filosofia de Andejo (1993)
- De a Cavalo (1994)
- Luiz Marenco Canta Noel Guarany (1996)
- Andarilho (1998)
- Quando o Verso Vem Pras Casa (1999)
- Luiz Marenco nos Festivais (1999)
- Estâncias da Fronteira (1999)
- Pra o Meu Consumo (2000)
- Enchendo os Olhos de Campo (2001)
- De Bota e Bombacha (2001)
- O Melhor de Luiz Marenco (2001)
- Luiz Marenco ao Vivo (2002)
- De Campeiro Pra Campeiro (2002)
