= Santo Antônio da Patrulha =

Municipality of Rio Grande do Sul, Brazil

- Municipality
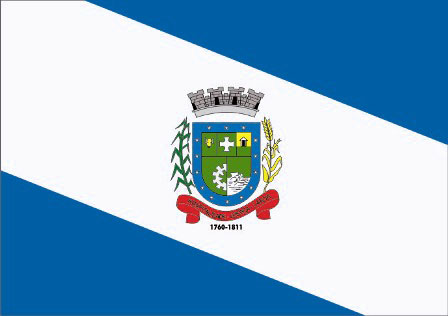
- Flag Coat of arms

- Location within Rio Grande do Sul

- Location in Brazil
- Coordinates: 29°50′S 50°32′W
- Country: Brazil
- State: Rio Grande do Sul

Population (2020)
  - Total: 43,171
- Time zone: UTC−3 (BRT)

Santo Antônio da Patrulha is a municipality in the Brazilian state of Rio Grande do Sul.

== See also ==
- List of municipalities in Rio Grande do Sul
