= Rolante =

Municipality of Rio Grande do Sul, Brazil

- Municipality
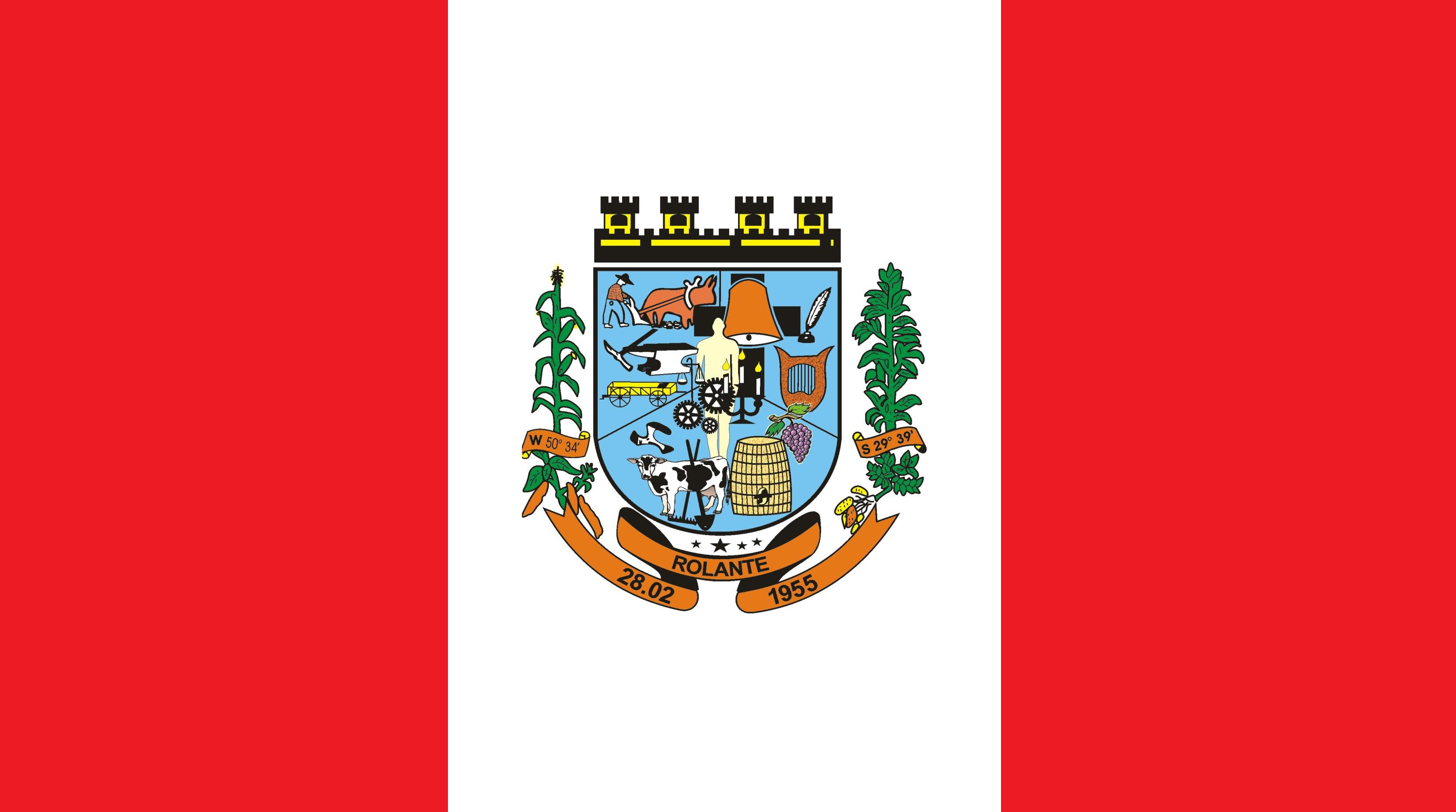
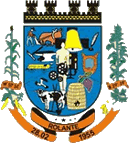
- Flag Coat of arms

- Location within Rio Grande do Sul

- Location in Brazil
- Coordinates: 29°40′S 50°34′W
- Country: Brazil
- State: Rio Grande do Sul

Population (2020)
  - Total: 21,453
- Time zone: BRT

Rolante (Rolling) is a municipality in the state of Rio Grande do Sul, Brazil.

Like many towns in the state, which were settled by German-speaking Europeans in the 19th century, the German language is still present in daily family and community life, if not as much in the public sphere since World War II; the regional German dialect is called Riograndenser Hunsrückisch, as it is a Brazilian variant of the dialect spoken in the Hunsrück region (Southwest Germany). In 2012 the state chamber of deputies voted unanimously in favor of recognizing this German dialect an official historical culture good to be preserved.

== See also ==
- German-Brazilian
- List of municipalities in Rio Grande do Sul
