= Ragnarök Festival =

Annual music festival in Germany

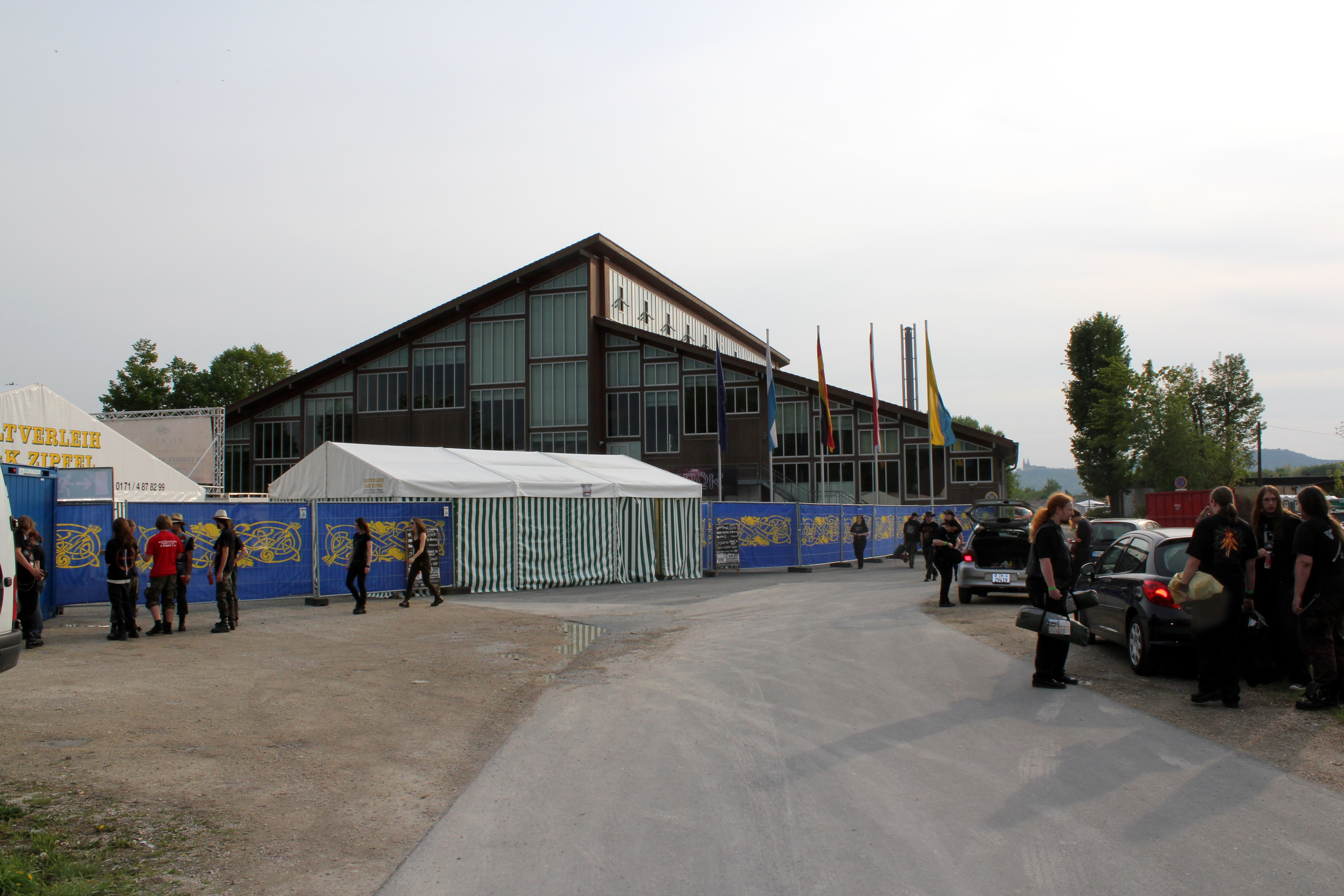
- The city-hall in Lichtenfels, where the Ragnarök Festival 2011 took place.
- Genre: Viking metal, Pagan metal, Black metal, Folk metal
- Dates: March/April
- Locations: Lichtenfels, Bavaria, Germany
- Years active: 2004 – present
- Founders: Ivo Raab
- Website: www.ragnaroek-festival.com

Ragnarök Festival is a pagan metal festival held annually in Germany since 2004 founded by Ivo Raab. It started out as a small, one-night festival with only regional bands in the town hall of Hollfeld. In 2005 it was decided to go for a festival featuring mostly Viking and pagan metal with the booking of bands like Månegarm, Menhir, Eisregen and Equilibrium. From 2006 on the festival took place in the significantly bigger town hall of Lichtenfels, Bavaria.

== History ==
The Ragnarök Metal Festival was founded by Ivo Raab in 2004. The festival's first edition featured seven bands, mostly death metal, and about 120 visitors. It did not pay off, but Raab decided to give it another try and organized it again in 2005. That year the line-up was specialized on Viking and pagan metal, and better-known bands were signed. Especially the headliners Eisregen attracted a lot of people as their rare live gigs are usually censored unless played to an adult audience. On Ragnarök the visitors received bracelets differently colored for people over and under the legal age of 18 years. Just before Eisregen's gig those visitors under legal age got their bracelet removed and had to leave the hall. Therefore, Eisregen were permitted to play songs from their censored albums as well.

The 2005 festival was also special because of the massive police presence. An anti-fascist union thought that the Ragnarök would be a fascist festival due to the name taken from Germanic mythology and informed the police. As a matter of fact, several hundred policemen were in the town which made the visitors feel quite uncomfortable. Another incident was when the town officials and the police told that only 600 people would be allowed in the hall because of security reasons. The hall's tenant has spoken of 3000 and Raab had to negotiate a lot to get the permission to let 1200 inside the hall.

With the hall now being far too small, the festival moved in 2006 to the town hall of Lichtenfels with the capacity of 3500 people. This year it was held over two days for the first time. Because of the festival being held in April, the organization arranged a sleeping hall, where visitors could rent a place to sleep. With 2800 visitors from all over Europe and even the US and Brazil it was quite a success.

Shortly after a TV report was shown on German public television that tried to connect the festival to the national-socialist and fascist scene. Hundreds of fans protested against this report and the festival publicized several statements, in which it distances itself explicitly from fascism.

In 2007 about 3200 people visited the festival. A lottery was held which benefits victims of fascist violence that collected about €1500, a rather low amount considering the number of visitors. Shirts and insignia of fascism and fascist bands were officially banned from the festival, the enforcement of this ban was not very consequent though. In 2008 the lineup shifted away from black metal back to a more pagan metal oriented lineup. In this year the festival attracted close to 5000 visitors, the maximum capacity of the hall.

== Lineups ==
=== 2014 ===
Adorned Brood, Arkona, Borknagar, Creature, Eïs, Fäulnis, Finntroll, Firtan, Fjoergyn, Graveworm, Imperium Dekadenz, Kampfar, Månegarm, Minas Morgul, Negator, Odroerir, Skalmöld, Stormlord, Suidakra, Todtgelichter, XIV Dark Centuries

=== 2013 ===
4–7 April 2013. The line-up consisted of Abinchova, Agrypnie, Asenblut, Ava Inferi, Carpathian Forest, Darkest Era, The Path of Freedom, Dornenreich, Eïs, Eluveitie, Fjoergyn, Hellreide, Helrunar, Heretoir, In Vain, Maladie, Menhir, Midnattsol, Nocte Obducta, Northland, Nothgard, Obscurity, Raven Wolf, Riger, Secrets of the Moon, Shining, Solefald, Under That Spell, Vreid and Winterstorm.

=== 2012 ===
Agalloch, Moonsorrow, Borknagar, Einherjer, Fejd, Absu, Skyclad, Wolfchant, Heol Telwen, Mistur, Myrkgrav (listening session), Nachtymystium, Impiety, XIV Dark Centuries, Voluspaa, Velnias, Rabenschrey, A Forest of Stars, Dark Fortress, Abinchova, Dordeduh, Imperious, King of Asgard, Mael Mordha, Sycronomica, Thurs, Waldgeflüster

=== 2011 ===
Adorned Brood, Agrypnie, Alcest, Arafel, Battlelore, Bifröst, BlackShore, Bran Barr, Catamenia, Ctulu, Dalriada, Eïs, Enslaved, Graveworm, Helrunar, Ignis Fatuu, Kampfar, Månegarm, Negură Bunget, Obscurity, Odroerir, Orphaned Land, Path of Golconda, Thyrfing, Todtgelichter, Twilight of the Gods and Valkyrja.

=== 2010 ===
Agathodaimon, Akrea, Arkona, Belphegor, Carach Angren, Ctulu, Ensiferum, Gorgoroth, GrailKnights, Haggard, Heathen Foray, Helfahrt, Hellsaw, Helrunar, Hollenthon, Imperium Dekadenz, Kromlek, Midnattsol, Obscurity, Ravenlore, Sarke, Skyforger, Slartibartfass, Sólstafir, Thormesis, Van Canto, Vreid, Wolves in the Throne Room

=== 2009 ===
Adorned Brood, Alestorm, Alkonost, Andras, Arkona (cancelled due to pregnancy of singer), Cor Scorpii, Dark Fortress, Dornenreich, Einherjer, Falchion, Fejd, Finsterforst, Fjoergyn, Gernotshagen (cancelled) Heidevolk, Irrbloss, Kivimetsän Druidi, Korpiklaani, Månegarm, Melechesh, Midnattsol (cancelled due to scheduling conflict), Sarkom, Thyrfing, Týr, Yggdrasil

=== 2008 ===
Agalloch, Arkona, Battlelore, Elexorien, Fimbulthier, Haggard, Hellsaw, Helritt, Helrunar, Killing Spree, Menhir, Minas Morgul, Negură Bunget, Norther, Primordial, Sear Bliss, Skyforger, Svartsot, Sworn, Thronar, Trimonium, Trollfest, Turisas, Unleashed, Vreid, Winterdome, Wolfchant, XIV Dark Centuries

=== 2007 ===
Aaskereia, Angantyr, Black Messiah, Cruachan, Eluveitie, Fjoergyn, Gernotshagen, Heidevolk, Hel, Helfahrt, Helheim, Kampfar, Koldbrann, Kromlek, Månegarm, Minas Morgul, Moonsorrow, Pagan Reign, Riger, Sycronomica, Týr, Urgehal, Vreid, Wolfchant, Taake (cancelled due to swastika scandal)

=== 2006 ===
Creature, Equilibrium, Fallen Yggdrasil, Gernotshagen, Helheim, Korpiklaani, Menhir, Moonsorrow, Nomans Land, Odroerir, Orlog, Primordial, Riger, Skyforger, Thrudvangar, Turisas, XIV Dark Centuries, Varg, Black Messiah (cancelled due to curfew), Sycronomica (cancelled due to illness)

=== 2005 ===
Circle of Obscurity, Conspiracy, Eisregen, Equilibrium, Helangår, Månegarm, Menhir, Mortal Intention, Thirdmoon, XIV Dark Centuries

=== 2004 ===
Circle of Obscurity, Daemonilatria, Defection, Killing Spree, Obstinacy, Possession, Voodoma
