= The Aftermath (Midnattsol album) =

Studio album by Midnattsol
- Released: 25 May 2018
- Recorded: Klangschmiede Studio E, Mellrichstadt, Germany
- Genre: Symphonic metal, folk metal
- Length: 53:24
- Language: English, Norwegian, Swedish
- Label: Napalm
- Producer: Midnattsol

Midnattsol chronology
The Metamorphosis Melody (2011)	The Aftermath (2018)

Singles from The Aftermath
- 1. "Herr Mannelig" Released: 29 March 2018; 2. "The Purple Sky" Released: 13 April 2018; 3. "The Aftermath" Released: 4 May 2018

The Aftermath is the fourth studio album by the German symphonic/folk metal band Midnattsol. It was released in 2018 on Napalm Records.

A music videos was made for the cover of the medieval piece "Herr Mannelig" (with lyrics in Swedish and featuring the making-of footage from the recording sessions) and for "The Purple Sky", directed by Michael Rother and Tim Loeschmann.

A limited edition was released with a bonus track.

== Background ==
The Aftermath represents the return of the band to the recording studios, after seven years in break. Midnattsol mastermind, singer and main songwriter Carmen Elise Espenæs was involved in a parallel musical project called Savn, and she was dedicated to her two sons, born in 2012 and 2014. Added to this, differences between some members of the band caused a greater delay in the production of the new album.

In December 2017, Liv Kristine (Carmen Elise's older sister), was introduced as the band's second official singer, after her sudden departure from Leaves' Eyes in 2016. Previously, bassist Birgit Öllbrunner, drummer Chris Merzinsky and guitarist Matthias Schuler left the band for personal reasons before the recording sessions began at the end of 2017.

Replacing them, producer and new member Stephan Adolph played all their instruments as session musician. Adolph (a friend of keyboardist Daniel Fischer) had already worked with Midnattsol on their debut album Where Twilight Dwells (2005)

== Musical style and writing ==
The album is characterized by its great compositional variety, including some slower songs than in previous works in a doom metal style such as the dark version for "Herr Mannelig", energetic themes such as "Syns sang" (about the Germanic goddess Syn), folk ballads such as "Vem kan segla", as well as a greater number of lyrics in Norwegian.

Lyrically, in comparison to its distant predecessor The Metamorphosis Melody (2011), The Aftermath has much more Nordic folk influences, including gothic metal songs with a somber social content as "Ikje glem meg" (about 2011 Utøya massacre) or "The Aftermath". In relation to the writing, Espenæs said:

[...] There were folk elements on the other albums as well, but on our new album «The Aftermath» I definitely think it's even more, and this is a direction where we definitely are heading more and more. I feel inspired by folk songs and tales, and I love learning more about the earlier days. We didn't have any restrictions when we were writing the album, just total freedom to let the creativity flow, so we sang and played things we haven`t done before. That was a fantastic feeling, I really loved writing the songs together with the other ones.

== Track listing ==
All lyrics are written by Carmen Elise Espenæs except where noted. *"Vem kan segla" (a lullaby song originally titled "Vem kan segla förutan vind?") and "Herr Mannelig" are Swedish folk ballads; all music is composed by Midnattsol

No.	Title	Lyrics	Length
1.	"The Purple Sky"		6:06
2.	"Syns sang" ("Syn's song")		5:01
3.	"Vem kan segla*" ("Who can sail")	Anonymous	3:47
4.	"Ikje glem meg" ("Don't forget me")		4:22
5.	"Herr Mannelig*" ("Sir Mannelig")	Anonymous	9:05
6.	"The Aftermath"		5:18
7.	"The Unveiled Truth"		3:58
8.	"Evaluation of Time"	Instrumental	6:44
9.	"Forsaken"		6:05
Total length:			51:11

Limited edition bonus track
No.	Title	Lyrics	Length
10.	"Eitrdropar" ("Drops of venom")	Liv Kristine Espenæs	2:53
Total length:			53:24

== Personnel ==
=== Midnattsol ===
- Carmen Elise Espenæs – vocals
- Liv Kristine – vocals
- Daniel Fischer – keyboards
- Alex Kautz – guitars
- Stephan Adolph – guitars, bass, vocals, drums (uncredited)

=== Production ===
- Rune Gunnar Stensøy – recording
- Stephan Adolph – mixing, mastering
- Heilemania – photography, artwork
- Joachim Cilslik – logo
