= Nordlys (disambiguation) =

Nordlys may refer to -

- Nordlys, a Norwegian newspaper first published in 1902
- Nordlys (album), an album by Norwegian band Midnattsol
- MS Nordlys, the name of two Hurtigruten cruise ships
- it translates as “Northern Lights” in the Norwegian and Danish languages, and refers to the Aurora Borealis
