= The Metamorphosis Melody =

Studio album by Midnattsol
- Released: 22 April 2011
- Recorded: Klangschmiede Studio E, Mellrichstadt, Germany
- Genre: Symphonic metal, folk metal
- Length: 56:19
- Language: English, Norwegian
- Label: Napalm
- Producer: Markus Stock

Midnattsol chronology
Nordlys (2008)	The Metamorphosis Melody (2011)	The Aftermath (2018)

Professional ratings
Review scores
Source	Rating
About.com	3.5/5 stars
Metal Storm	(7.8/10)
Femme Metal	(90/100)
Metal Temple	7/10 stars

The Metamorphosis Melody is the third studio album by the German symphonic/folk metal band Midnattsol. It was released on April 22, 2011 through Napalm Records.

A music video was made for the song "Kong Valemons Kamp" (the first for the band), featuring behind-the-scenes footage taken from the album recording sessions in Mellrichstadt.

A limited edition was released with a bonus track and a DVD featuring a Midnattsol live performance of 17 October 2009 at Metal Female Voices Fest VII in Wieze, Belgium.

== Background ==
The album was recorded with Alex Kautz as the new Midnattsol guitarist, who joined the band shortly after the release of their previous album Nordlys in 2008, replacing to Fabian Pospiech.

Later, guitarist and composer Daniel Droste left the band after the recording sessions for the album that finished in 2010 to focus solely on his own band Abab. To replace him, joined Matthias Schuler as official member for the respective European promotional tour, made between April and October 2011.

Compared to their previous work, The Metamorphosis Melody heads towards a more symphonic Nordic sound and includes some themes inspired by Norwegian folk tales, with soothing vocals coming from the voice of Carmen Elise Espenæs, but less operatic. About the album context, Espenæs said:

[...] The title refers to different kinds of things. One of the main things that the title stands as a symbol for is that we have changed as a band. The music has developed, you could say that we have gone through a metamorphosis ourselves in Midnattsol. And one of the reasons why we think that, is because we have gotten a new band member, Alex [Kautz. [...]

== Track listing ==
All lyrics are written by Carmen Elise Espenæs, except for "A Predator's Prey" by Daniel Droste. *"Kong Valemons kamp" is based on White-Bear-King-Valemon, a traditional Norwegian fairy tale; all music is composed by Midnattsol.

No.	Title	Length
1.	"Alv" ("Elf")	1:45
2.	"The Metamorphosis Melody"	5:52
3.	"Spellbound"	5:23
4.	"The Tide"	5:16
5.	"A Poet's Prayer"	5:31
6.	"Forlorn"	4:49
7.	"Kong Valemons kamp*" ("King Valemon's Struggle")	6:34
8.	"Goodbye"	3:31
9.	"Forvandlingen" ("Transformation")	6:53
10.	"Motets makt" ("Courage Power")	5:21
11.	"My Re-Creation"	5:24
Total length:		56:19

Limited edition bonus track
No.	Title	Length
12.	"A Predator's Prey"	5:29
Total length:		61:48

== Limited edition bonus DVD En natt i Wieze ==
No.	Title	Length
1.	"En natt i nord" ("A Night in the North")	6:17
2.	"Haunted"	3:49
3.	"Northern Light"	6:48
4.	"Konkylie" ("Seashell")	7:58
5.	"Open Your Eyes"	5:49
6.	"Lament"	5:37
7.	"Intro"	0:51
8.	"Skogens lengsel" ("The Forest's Longing")	5:33
9.	"Tapt av håp" ("The Loss of Hope")	8:42
10.	"Outro"	0:48
Total length:		53:00

== Personnel ==
=== Midnattsol ===
- Carmen Elise Espenæs - Vocals
- Birgit Öllbrunner - Bass & Acoustic Bass & Mouthharp
- Daniel Droste - Guitar
- Alex Kautz - Guitar & Acoustic Guitar
- Daniel Fischer - Keyboards
- Christopher Merzinsky - Drums & Percussion

=== Production ===
- Markus Stock - producer, engineer, mixing, mastering
- Stefan Heilemann - artwork, photography
