= Oldarhian =

Studio album by Sarke
- Released: 15 April 2011
- Recorded: October–December 2010
- Studio: H-10 Productions, Oslo
- Genre: Black metal, thrash metal
- Length: 40:39
- Label: Indie Recordings
- Producer: Lars-Erik Westby

Sarke chronology
| Vorunah (2009) | Oldarhian (2011) | Aruagint (2013) |

Oldarhian is the second album by Norwegian black/thrash metal band Sarke. It was released 15 April 2011 via Indie Recordings.

== History ==
On 18 October 2010, Sarke, this time with a full line-up, entered the studio, always with producer Lars-Erik Westby. In February 2011, it was announced that the new album, titled Oldarhian, would be released on 15 April 2011.

On 19 April, there was the release party in Oslo for Oldarhian, featuring special guests Insidious Disease.

== Track listing ==
| No. | Title | Length |
|---|---|---|
| 1. | "Condemned" | 3:45 |
| 2. | "Pilgrim of the Cult" | 4:21 |
| 3. | "Pessimist" | 4:19 |
| 4. | "Passage to Oldarhian" | 4:11 |
| 5. | "Flay the Wolf" | 3:09 |
| 6. | "Captured" | 4:36 |
| 7. | "Paradigm Lost" | 3:29 |
| 8. | "Novel Dawn" | 4:15 |
| 9. | "Burning of the Monoliths" | 4:28 |
| 10. | "The Stranger Brew" | 4:06 |
| Total length: | | 40:39 |

== Credits ==
- Sarke – bass
- Nocturno Culto – vocals
- Asgeir Mickelson – drums
- Cyrus – guitar
- Steinar Gundersen – guitar
- Anders Hunstad – keyboards

Production

- Lars-Erik Westby – producer
