= Aruagint =

Studio album by Sarke
- Released: 20 September 2013
- Studio: H-10 Productions, Oslo
- Genre: Black metal, thrash metal
- Length: 38:08
- Label: Indie Recordings
- Producer: Lars-Erik Westby

Sarke chronology
Oldarhian (2011)	Aruagint (2013)	Bogefod (2016)

Aruagint is the third album by Norwegian black/thrash metal band Sarke. It was released 20 September 2013 via Indie Recordings.

== History ==
In April 2013, it was announced that Sarke would have released their third album Aruagint on 24 May 2013 and that the artwork was created by known artist Maxime Taccardi. Anyway, it was announced that the release date had been postponed and that the album would be released in 2014.

On 28 August 2013, it was announced that the new release date was 20 September 2013 for Norway, Germany, Austria and Switzerland, and 23 September 2013 for the rest of the world.

== Track listing ==
No.	Title	Length
1.	"Jaunt of the Obsessed"	3:01
2.	"Jodau Aura"	4:55
3.	"Ugly"	2:09
4.	"Strange Pungent Odyssey"	3:17
5.	"Walls of Ru"	3:56
6.	"Salvation"	3:57
7.	"Skeleton Sand"	5:53
8.	"Icon Usurper"	6:38
9.	"Rabid Hunger"	4:22
Total length:		38:08

== Credits ==
Band

- Sarke – bass
- Nocturno Culto – vocals
- Asgeir Mickelson – drums
- Steinar Gundersen – guitar
- Anders Hunstad – keyboards

Production

- Lars-Erik Westby – producer

Artwork

- Maxime Taccardi
