= Nordlys (album) =

Studio album by Midnattsol
- Released: 28 March 2008
- Recorded: Klangschmiede Studio E, Mellrichstadt, Mastersound Studios, Fellbach, Germany
- Genre: Gothic metal, symphonic metal, folk metal
- Length: 50:01
- Language: English, Norwegian
- Label: Napalm
- Producer: Markus Stock, Alexander Krull, Thorsten Bauer

Midnattsol chronology
Where Twilight Dwells (2005)	Nordlys (2008)	The Metamorphosis Melody (2011)

Professional ratings
Review scores
Source	Rating
About.com	3/5 stars
Lords of Metal	(82/100)
Metal Temple	7/10 stars
Sea of Tranquility	4/5 stars

Nordlys ("Northern Light" in Norwegian) is the second full-length studio album by the German symphonic/folk metal band Midnattsol. It was released on 28 March 2008 through Napalm Records.

== Background ==
After three years of the release of their well-received debut album Where Twilight Dwells (2005), Midnattsol decided change direction and to compose an album with dark atmospheres in a melodic and heavy sound, influenced more closely by traditional gothic metal. In contrast, Nordlys is little inspired by Nordic folk metal and it is less introspective that its predecessor.

Particularly noteworthy is the experimentation in the vocals of their lead singer Carmen Elise Espenæs, as well as the extensive dedication in the guitar solos of Daniel Droste and Christian Hector. However, Hector (a founding member), left the group shortly after the release of the album in order to concentrate on his other band Ahab, being briefly replaced by Fabian Pospiech in the three live performances that made Midnattsol in Europe to promote the album.

== Track listing ==
All lyrics are written by Carmen Elise Espenæs, except on "Octobre" by Christian Hector; all music is composed by Midnattsol.

No.	Title	Length
1.	"Open Your Eyes"	5:43
2.	"Skogens lengsel" ("The Forest's Longing")	5:04
3.	"Northern Light"	6:19
4.	"Konkylie" ("Seashell")	8:13
5.	"Wintertime"	5:17
6.	"Race of Time"	5:40
7.	"New Horizon"	2:51
8.	"River of Virgin Soil"	5:37
9.	"En natt i nord" ("A Night in the North")	5:17
10.	"Octobre" (limited edition bonus track)	4:42
Total length:		54:43

== Personnel ==
=== Midnattsol ===
- Carmen Elise Espenæs – Vocals
- Birgit Öllbrunner – Bass & Acoustic Bass
- Daniel Droste – Lead Guitar & Acoustic Guitar & Vocals
- Christian Hector – Rhythm Guitar & Acoustic Guitar
- Daniel Fischer – Keyboards
- Chris Merzinsky – Drums & Percussion

=== Production ===
- Markus Stock - producer, engineer
- Alexander Krull, Thorsten Bauer - producers and recording engineers of vocals
- Tue Madsen - mixing
- Mika Jussila - mastering
- Ingo Römling - artwork
- Jens Howorka - photography
