= The Boats of the "Glen Carrig" (album) =

The Boats of the Glen Carrig

Studio album by Ahab
- Released: 28 August 2015
- Genres: Funeral doom metal, progressive rock
- Length: 66:19
- Label: Napalm Records
- Producer: Ahab

Ahab chronology
The Giant (2012)	The Boats of the Glen Carrig (2015)	The Coral Tombs (2023)

The Boats of the Glen Carrig is the fourth studio album by the German funeral doom metal band Ahab. It was released on 28 August 2015 through Napalm Records. It is a concept album based on William Hope Hodgson's novel of the same name.

Professional ratings
Review scores
Source	Rating
AntiHero Magazine	8.5/10 stars

== Track listing ==
No.	Title	Length
1.	"The Isle"	10:11
2.	"The Thing That Made Search"	11:06
3.	"Like Red Foam (The Great Storm)"	6:25
4.	"The Weedmen"	15:01
5.	"To Mourn Job"	13:45
6.	"The Light in the Weed (Mary Madison)"	10:31
7.	"The Turn of a Friendly Card" (The Alan Parsons Project cover) (vinyl bonus track)	5:17
Total length:		01:11:36

== Personnel ==
- Daniel Droste – vocals, guitar, keyboards
- Christian Hector – guitar
- Stephan Wandernoth – bass
- Cornelius Althammer – drums

Guest musician

- Olav Iversen – vocals in "The Turn of a Friendly Card"

Production

- Sebastian Jerke
