= The Call of the Wretched Sea =

Studio album by Ahab
- Released: 10 October 2006
- Genre: Funeral doom metal
- Length: 66:18
- Labels: Napalm, Deviant
- Producer: Stephan Adolph

Ahab chronology
The Oath (2005)	The Call of the Wretched Sea (2006)	The Divinity of Oceans (2009)

The Call of the Wretched Sea is the debut album by the German funeral doom band Ahab. It was released in October 2006.

== History ==
The Call of the Wretched Sea is Ahab's first studio album. It was the band's first recording since their first two demos. To record the album, they recruited Corny Althammer as session drummer. Production, engineering, mastering and mixing tasks were carried out by Stephan Adolph.

It was released on 10 October 2006 through Napalm Records. Double-LP versions of this album were released through Deviant Records; there were 100 copies in green vinyl, 100 copies in red vinyl, and 300 copies in black vinyl.

== Music ==
The album has been treated as an example of what funeral doom metal represents. It features slow synthesizer melodies, downtuned guitars, echoing percussion, and deep and guttural vocals. Chants and choral vocal parts are also arranged at various points during the album. The track "Old Thunder" features an orchestrated central portion as well as clean-droned baritones substituting the guttural vocals in some sections. "The Sermon" has a central passage of near-silent melodic ripples that temporarily interrupt the album's guitar passages.

The Call of the Wretched Sea is a concept album which attempts to reinterpret Herman Melville's 1851 novel Moby-Dick. Some of its lyrics have been adapted directly from Melville's writings. The album tries to represent the feelings of foreboding as told through the story of the book's main character, the despotic Captain Ahab.

== Critical reception ==
Professional ratings
Review scores
Source	Rating
AllMusic	4/5 stars
blabbermouth.net	8/10 stars

The album was given a 4 of 5 by AllMusic and an 8 of 10 by blabbermouth.net. It has been considered a fine example of the style, but not appealing enough to people who don't appreciate doom metal, specifically funeral doom.

== Track listing ==
Music by Ahab. Lyrics written by Herman Melville except "The Pacific" by Daniel Droste and Melville; "Old Thunder" by Christian Hector; and "The Hunt" by Christian Hoffarth.

No.	Title	Music	Length
1.	"Below the Sun"	Ahab	11:45
2.	"The Pacific"		10:07
3.	"Old Thunder"		9:54
4.	"Of the Monstrous Pictures of Whales" (instrumental)		1:52
5.	"The Sermon"		12:36
6.	"The Hunt"		11:13
7.	"Ahab's Oath"		10:11

== Personnel ==
Ahab

- Daniel Droste – vocals, guitar
- Christian Hector – guitar, layout design
- Stephan Adolph – bass, guitar, vocals, production, engineering, mastering, mixing
- Cornelius Althammer – drums

Other

- Caroline Traitler – photography
