= Anders Hunstad =

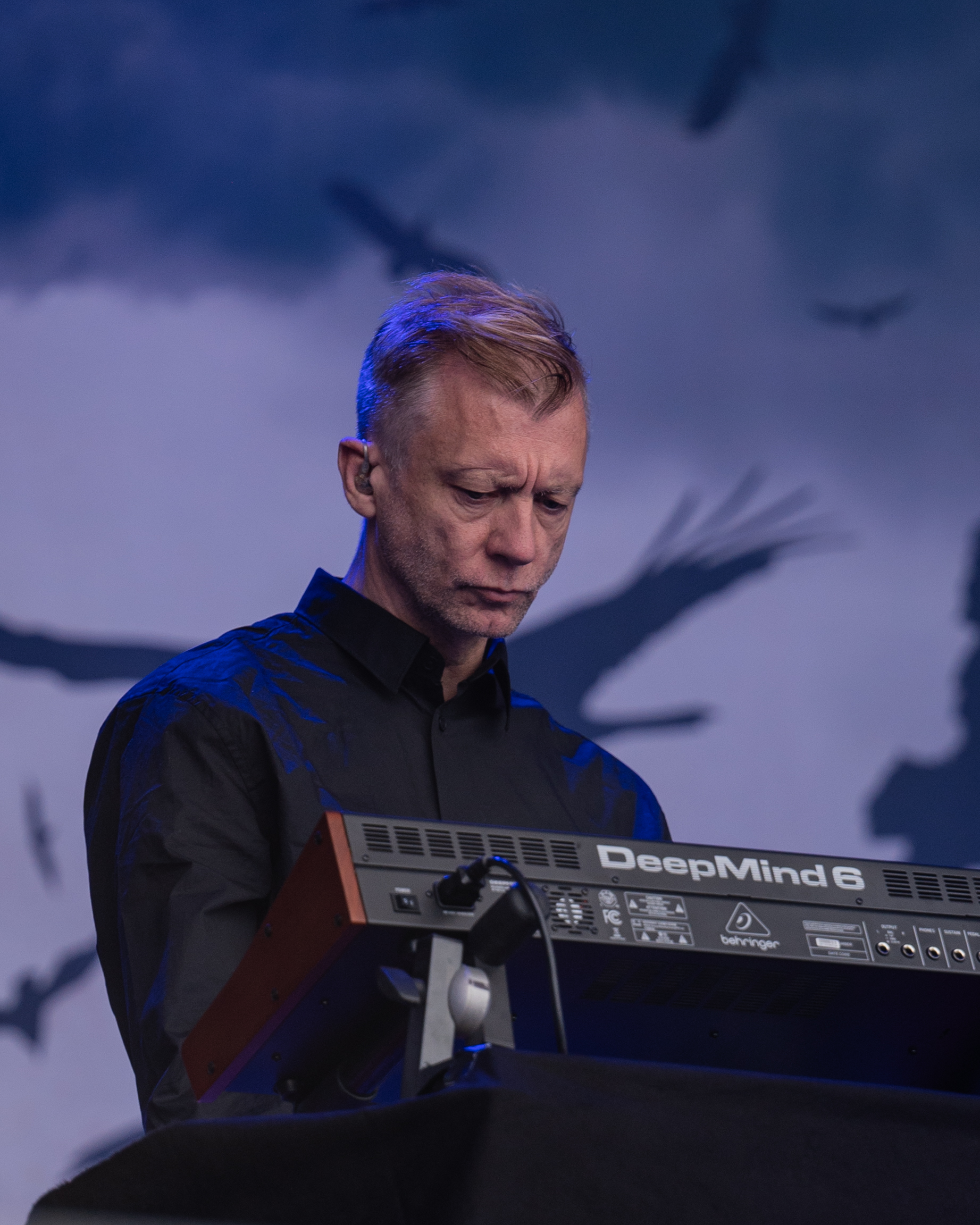
- Hunstad performing with Satyricon in 2024

Background information
- Born: 3 February 1974
- Origin: Norway
- Occupation(s): Musician, songwriter
- Instrument(s): Keyboard, synthesizer, drums, bass guitar, vocals
- Years active: 1996–present

Anders Hunstad (born 3 February 1974) is a Norwegian musician and songwriter from Oslo.

== Discography ==
- 1996 – Ravana "Common Daze"
- 1999 – Prosessor Balthazar "Riot 99"
- 2000 – Autopulver "Vapor Trails"
- 2002 – Morris "Ingen ringere enn..."
- 2003 – The Landlords "Meant to be"
- 2003 – El Caco "The Search"
- 2005 – Surferosa "The Force"
- 2006 – Bermuda Triangle "33rpm"
- 2006 – One People "Love is forever (The Indigenous Soul)"
- 2006 – One People "Tatanka"
- 2007 – Tulus "Biography Obscene"
- 2007 – Tvang "En ny morgen"
- 2007 – One People "In The Beginning Was Love (The Indigenous Soul)
- 2008 – Plywood "Vitesse"
- 2009 – Sarke "Vorunah"
- 2009 – Meanderthals "Desire Lines"
- 2009 – Tvang "Unik"
- 2009 – Bermuda Triangle "Love Computer City"
- 2009 – El Caco "Heat"
- 2010 – Sarah Jo "Inner child, the wise & me vol. 1"
- 2011 – Sarke "Oldarhian"
- 2011 – SOT "Kind Of Saltz"
- 2011 – Karen Jo Field "4 Songs"
- 2012 – One Prayer
- 2013 – Sarke "Aruagint"
- 2014 – Lonely Kamel "Shit City"
- 2014 – SOT "Redwings Nest"
- 2015 – Satyricon "Live at the Opera"
- 2016 – Lonely Kamel "Blues for the dead"
- 2017 – SOT "Kogel Mogel"
- 2017 – Sarke "Viige Uhr"
- 2019 – Sarke "Gastwerso"
- 2019 – AtomHart "AtomHart EP"

== Live session work ==
- Satyricon (2011–present)
- Sarke (2008–present)
- Infidels Forever (2007)
- Briskeby (2005–2007)
- Morten Abel (2005–2006)
- Karen Jo Fields (2004–2007)
- Aggie Frost (2002–2006)
