= The Divinity of Oceans =

Studio album by Ahab
- Released: 22 July 2009
- Genre: Funeral doom metal
- Length: 66:56
- Label: Napalm Records

Ahab chronology
The Call of the Wretched Sea (2006)	The Divinity of Oceans (2009)	The Giant (2012)

Professional ratings
Review scores
Source	Rating
Allmusic	3.5/5 stars
Blabbermouth.net	8.5/10 stars
MetalReview	9/10 stars

The Divinity of Oceans is the second album by the German funeral doom metal band Ahab. This album was also released through Napalm Records, like their previous releases were.

The album's lyrics are based on the real-life sinking of the Essex whaleship in 1820, the event that inspired Herman Melville to write Moby-Dick. The album's cover was taken from the painting The Raft of the Medusa, by French Romantic painter Théodore Géricault.

== Track listing ==
No.	Title	Length
1.	"Yet Another Raft of the Medusa (Pollard's Weakness)"	12:40
2.	"The Divinity of Oceans"	11:03
3.	"O Father Sea"	7:07
4.	"Redemption Lost"	10:25
5.	"Tombstone Carousal"	7:27
6.	"Gnawing Bones (Coffin's Lot)"	10:48
7.	"Nickerson's Theme"	8:06
Total length:		1:06:56

== Personnel ==
=== Band line-up ===
- Daniel Droste – vocals, guitar, synthesizers
- Christian Hector – guitar
- Stephan Wandernoth – bass
- Cornerlius Althammer – drums

=== Artwork ===
- Théodore Géricault – album artwork, Le Radeau de la Méduse

== Release history ==
Region	Date	Label	Format	Additional notes
Spain, Finland	22 July 2009	Napalm Records	Compact Disc	
Italy, Austria, Switzerland, Italy, Germany, France, Sweden	24 July 2009	Napalm Records	Compact Disc	
	24 July 2009	Napalm Records	2 x Vinyl	Limited to 500 copies
The rest of Europe	27 July 2009	Napalm Records	Compact Disc	
Canada, United States	28 July 2009	Napalm Records	Compact Disc	
