= Vorunah =

Studio album by Sarke
- Released: 6 April 2009
- Recorded: November 2008
- Studio: H-10 Productions, Oslo
- Genre: Black metal, thrash metal
- Length: 37:43
- Label: Indie Recordings
- Producer: Lars-Erik Westby

Sarke chronology
Vorunah (2009)	Oldarhian (2011)

Vorunah is the debut album by Norwegian black/thrash metal band Sarke. It was released on 6 April 2009 via Indie Recordings.

== History ==
In 2008, Thomas "Sarke" Bergli, drummer for Khold, decided to form a solo project. Sarke contacted Darkthrone vocalist/guitarist Ted "Nocturno Culto" Skjellum, and in November of the same year they entered the studio and recorded Vorunah. In February 2009, it was announced that Sarke signed with Norwegian record label Indie Recordings.

== Track listing ==
No.	Title	Length
1.	"Primitive Killing"	4:23
2.	"Vorunah"	4:04
3.	"The Drunken Priest"	3:26
4.	"Frost Junkie"	6:26
5.	"Old"	3:44
6.	"Cult Ritual"	6:35
7.	"13 Candles"	6:59
8.	"Dead Universe"	2:06
Total length:		37:43

== Credits ==
- Sarke – guitar, bass, drums
- Nocturno Culto – vocals
- Anders Hunstad – keyboards

Production

- Lars-Erik Westby – producer
