= Sarke =

Norwegian extreme metal band

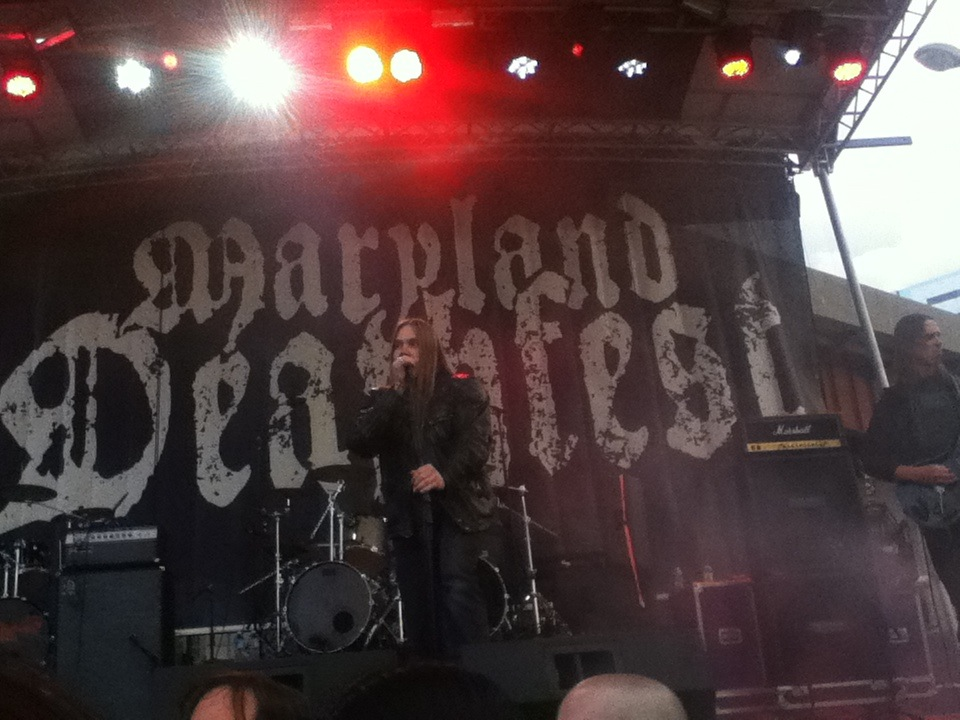
- Sarke performing at Maryland Deathfest in 2014

Background information
- Origin: Oslo, Norway
- Genres: Black metal, thrash metal
- Years active: 2008–2025
- Label: Indie Recordings
- Past members: Sarke; Nocturno Culto; Anders Hunstad; Terje Kråbøl; Steinar Gundersen; Cyrus; Asgeir Mickelson

Sarke was a Norwegian black/thrash metal band from Oslo, active from 2008 to 2025. They released seven studio albums and were most recently signed to Indie Recordings.

== History ==
Sarke formed in 2008, when Thomas "Sarke" Bergli (Khold, Tulus) made a solo album. In November 2008, Sarke recorded the tracks for the Lars-Erik Westby-produced album with keyboardist Anders Hunstad. Ted "Nocturno Culto" Skjellum (Darkthrone, ex-Satyricon) joined on vocals for the debut album, Vorunah, which Indie Recordings released on 6 April 2009. In 2009, drummer Asgeir Mickelson and guitarist Terje "Cyrus" Andersen joined the band as live members. In 2010, Steinar Gundersen joined Sarke as their second guitar player. In 2009 and 2010, the band played at Wacken Open Air (with the guest appearance of Thomas Gabriel Fischer), Inferno Festival, Hole in the Sky, Party.San Open Air, Brutal Assault and Ragnarök Festival. After the festivals, Mickelson, Cyrus, and Gundersen became full-time members.

On 15 April 2011, Sarke released Oldarhian via Indie Recordings.

On 20 September 2013, the band released their third studio album, Aruagint, via Indie Recordings.

On 21 February 2025, the band announced they had broken up.

== Musical style and influences ==
Sarke's sound can be described as a blend of black metal and thrash metal, that incorporates doom metal, death metal and punk elements. According to the band, they are influenced by '70s rock, '80s speed metal and '90s black metal. They are inspired by bands like Mayhem, Slayer, Darkthrone, Celtic Frost, Black Sabbath, Candlemass, Death, Motörhead and Kreator.

== Members ==
Final lineup

- Sarke – drums, guitar (2008–2011); bass (2008–2025)
- Nocturno Culto – lead vocals (2008–2025)
- Anders Hunstad – keyboards (2008–2025)
- Terje Kråbøl – drums (2011–2025)
- Steinar Gundersen – guitar (2011–2025)

Former members

- Cyrus – guitar (2011–2013)

Session members

- Asgeir Mickelson – drums (2009–2011)
- Cyrus – guitar (2009–2011)
- Steinar Gundersen – guitar (2010–2011)

== Discography ==
- Vorunah (2009)
- Oldarhian (2011)
- Aruagint (2013)
- Bogefod (2016)
- Viige Urh (2017)
- Gastwerso (2019)
- Allsighr (2021)
- Endo Feight (2024)
