= Ctulu =

German extreme metal band

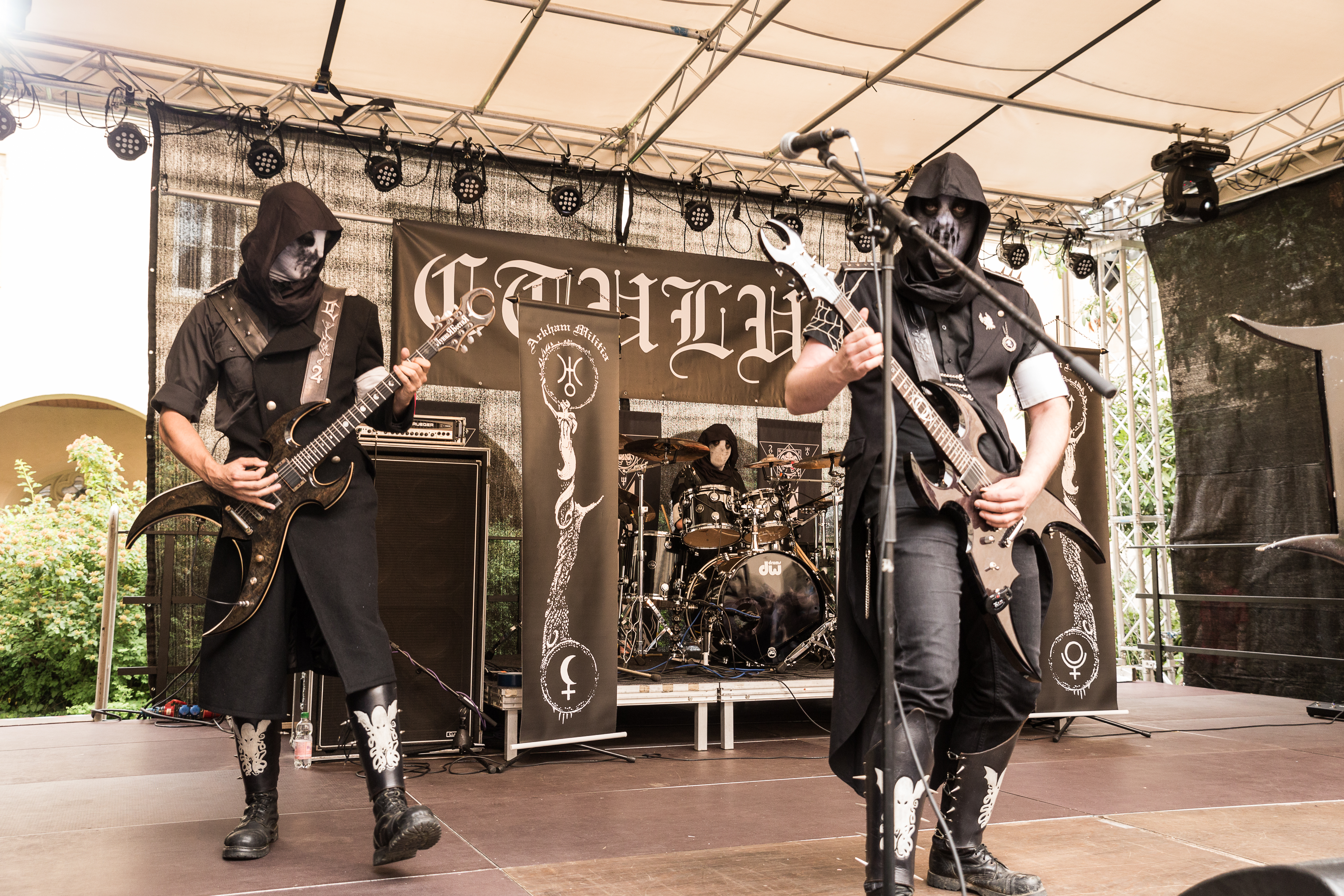
- Ctulu live at Skaldenfest, Würzburg 2018

Background information
- Origin: Germany
- Genres: Extreme metal
- Years active: 2004-Present
- Labels: MDD Records
- Members: M. A. (2008); I.D. (2013)
- Past members: Lasse; Martin; Lars; Rolf; Paulo; Jan; Mario; Stefan; Chrille
- Website: www.ctulu.de

Ctulu is an extreme metal band from Germany, founded in 2004. The name derives from the fictional creature Cthulhu, invented by American novelist H.P. Lovecraft.

== History ==
Ctulu was founded in Delmenhorst, Lower Saxony, at the end of 2004. At that time, the lineup consisted of Mathias (guitars and bass) and Stefan (vocals, keyboards and drums) only. The first demo "Zins der Zeit" was recorded with this lineup in 2005 and included keyboards which never again have occurred on the later releases.

To be able to play concerts, Jan (drums) and Chrille (bass) joined the band. Their first shows were played in 2006 and 2007, including Hamburg, Delmenhorst and Athens (Greece). The second demo "Freie Geister" followed with this new lineup and included four tracks.

Chrille left the band in 2007 and was replaced with Mario. In 2008, the first full-length album Freie Geister was expanded by four extra tracks and released via Northfire Records and Twilight Distribution. Several concerts followed while the first Paganfest show ever was opened by Ctulu in Bremen. Arne joined the band as a second guitarist before the album was released, but did not contribute to it.

In 2009, Stefan left the band and shows in Germany, Austria and Denmark were played. Rolf (vocals) joined the band in autumn that year.

In 2010, Ctulu were introduced to a broader audience by playing the venerable Ragnarök Festival in Bavaria. Mario left the band in autumn.

In 2011, Ctulu released their second full-length album Sarkomand at the Ragnarök Festival. Later that year, Rolf and Paulo left the band and were replaced by Lars (vocals) and Lasse (bass). Lars, though, left the band already after a few weeks and Ctulu continued as a band of four. In May, Ctulu and their new album Sarkomand were topic of a two-hour radio broadcast in Germany's biggest online metal radio "Metal Only".

In 2012, Ctulu played concerts in Celle, Athens, London and Limassol and announced their forthcoming third studio album Seelenspiegelsplitter, which is to be released in April 2013. In October, Ctulu parted ways with drummer Martin.

== Style ==
=== Music ===
Ctulu's music is guitar dominated extreme metal. Journalists tend to describe the music as black metal in old Scandinavian style, but with influence from various other rock styles. Ctulu themselves call their music "Seastorming Extreme Metal".

=== Lyrics ===
Ctulu's lyrics are dominated by stories inspired from H.P. Lovecraft's tales, while mostly being about death, dreams and gods. All lyrics are in German language.

== Band members ==
=== Current members ===
Ctulu live at Skaldenfest 2018 in Würzburg

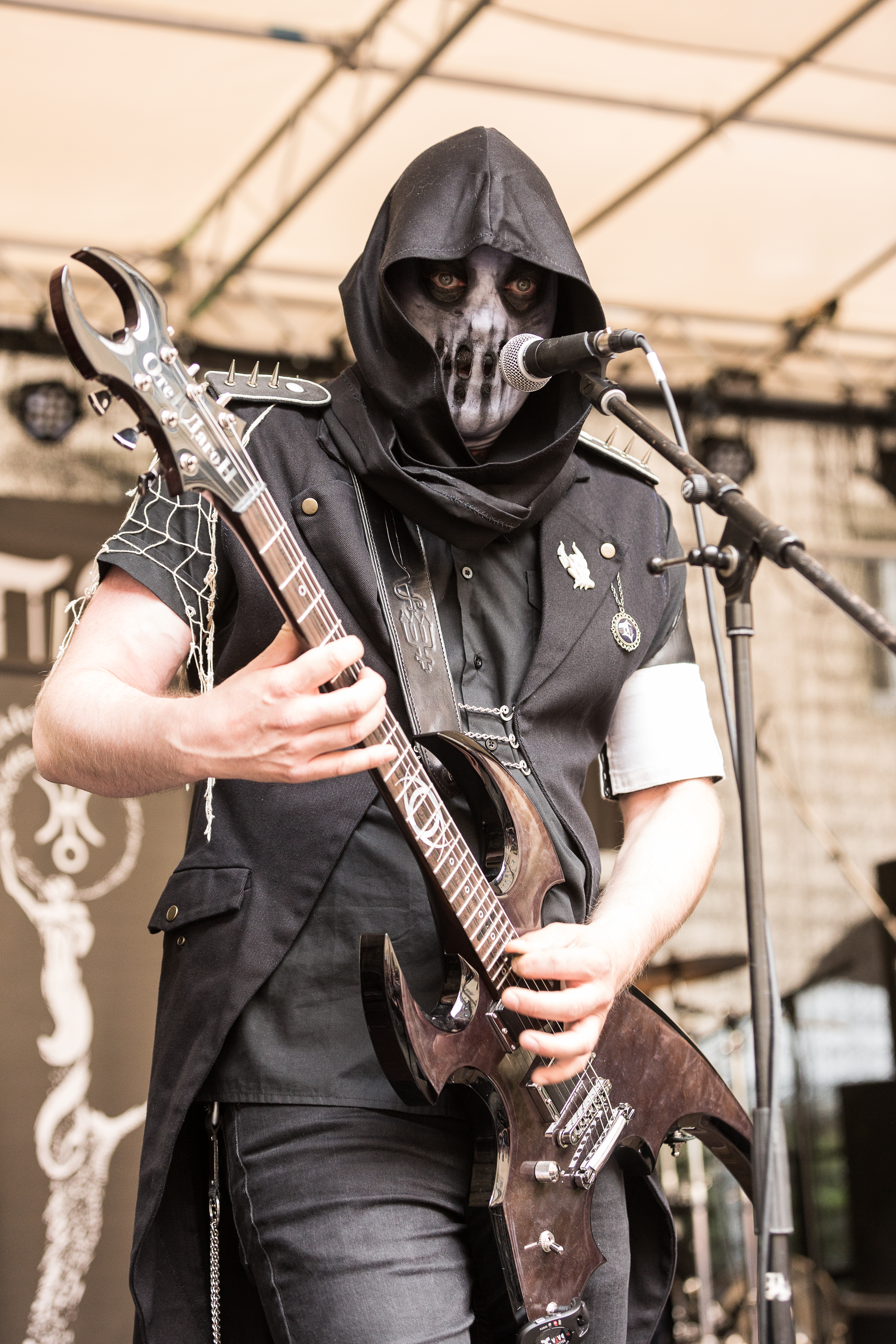
Guitarist and singer M.

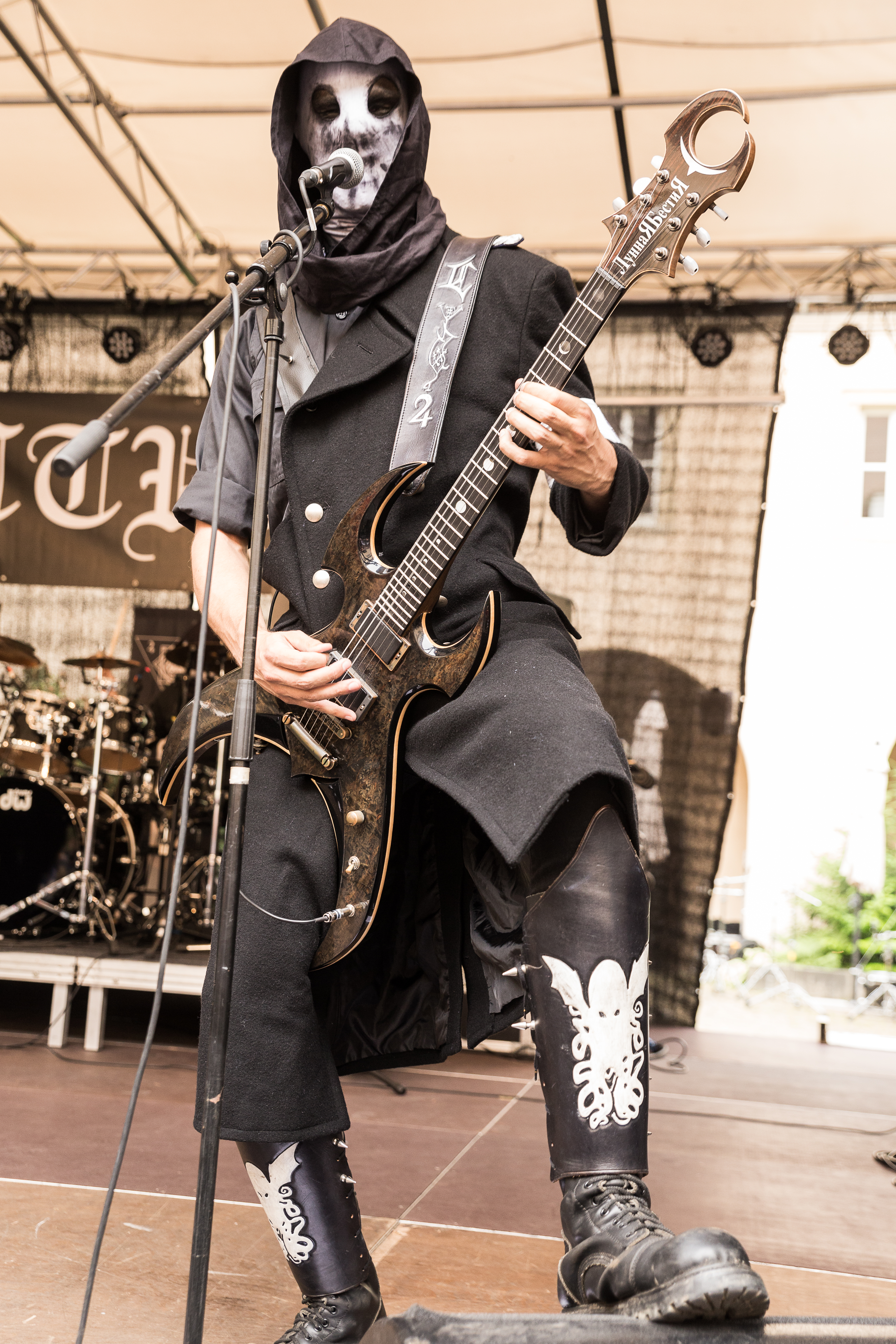
Guitarist and bassist A.

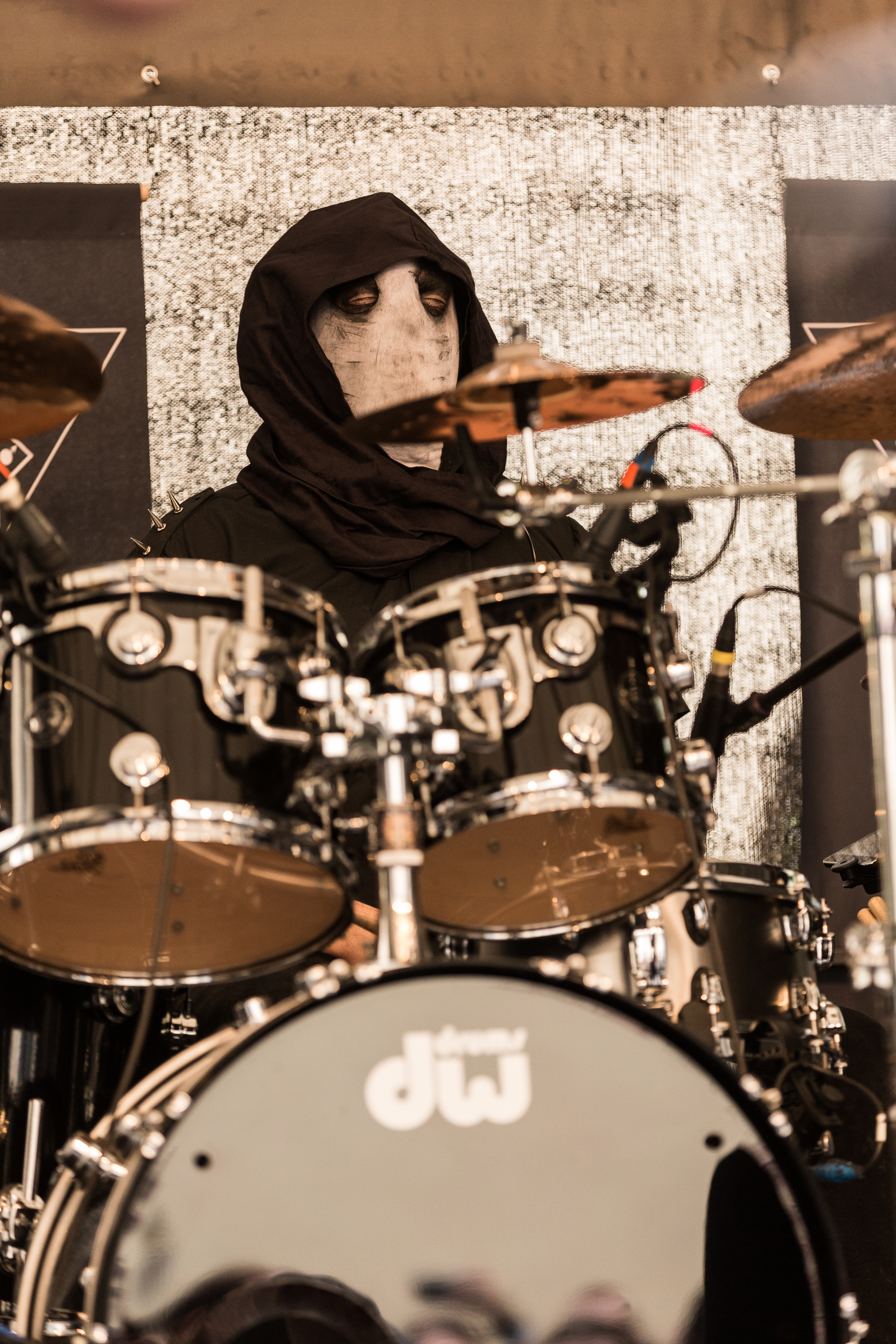
Drummer I.D.
- M. – guitars, vocals
- A. – guitars, bass, vocals
- I.D. – drums

=== Past members ===
- Lasse (2011-2015) - bass
- Martin (2009-2012) - drums
- Lars (2011) - vocals
- Rolf (2009–2011) – vocals
- Paulo (2011) – bass
- Jan (2006–2010) – drums
- Mario (2007–2010) – bass
- Stefan (2004–2009) – vocals
- Chrille (2006–2007) – bass

== Discography ==
Studio albums

- Freie Geister (2008)
- Sarkomand (2011)
- Seelenspiegelsplitter (2013)
- Ctulu (2016)

Demos

- Zins der Zeit (2005)
- Freie Geister (2006)
