= The Giant (Ahab album) =

Studio album by Ahab
- Released: 25 May 2012
- Recorded: January–February 2012 at Überwälder Klangdressur, Grasellenbach
- Genre: Funeral doom metal, progressive rock
- Length: 59:39
- Label: Napalm Records
- Producer: Ahab & Jens Siefert

Ahab chronology
The Divinity of Oceans (2009)	The Giant (2012)	The Boats of the "Glen Carrig" (2015)

Professional ratings
Review scores
Source	Rating
About.com	4/5 stars
AllMusic	4/5 stars
Blistering	8/10
Chronicles of Chaos	8.5/10

The Giant is the third studio album by the German funeral doom metal band Ahab released through their long time label mate Napalm Records. The lyrics are based on Edgar Allan Poe's 1838 novel The Narrative of Arthur Gordon Pym of Nantucket.

== Track listing ==
No.	Title	Length
1.	"Further South"	8:55
2.	"Aeons Elapse"	12:44
3.	"Deliverance (Shouting at the Dead)"	7:52
4.	"Antarctica the Polymorphess"	11:45
5.	"Fathoms Deep Below"	9:07
6.	"The Giant"	10:36
Total length:		59:39

Digipack & Vinyl bonus tracks

No.	Title	Length
7.	"Time's Like Molten Lead" (digipack and vinyl bonus track)	11:05
8.	"Evening Star" (vinyl bonus track)	11:35

== Personnel ==
Ahab

- Daniel Droste – vocals, guitar, keyboards
- Christian Hector – guitar
- Stephan Wandernoth – bass
- Cornerlius Althammer – drums

Production

- Jens Siefert – recording, production, mixing and mastering
- Sebastian Jerke – artwork
