= Midnattsol =

German gothic/folk metal band

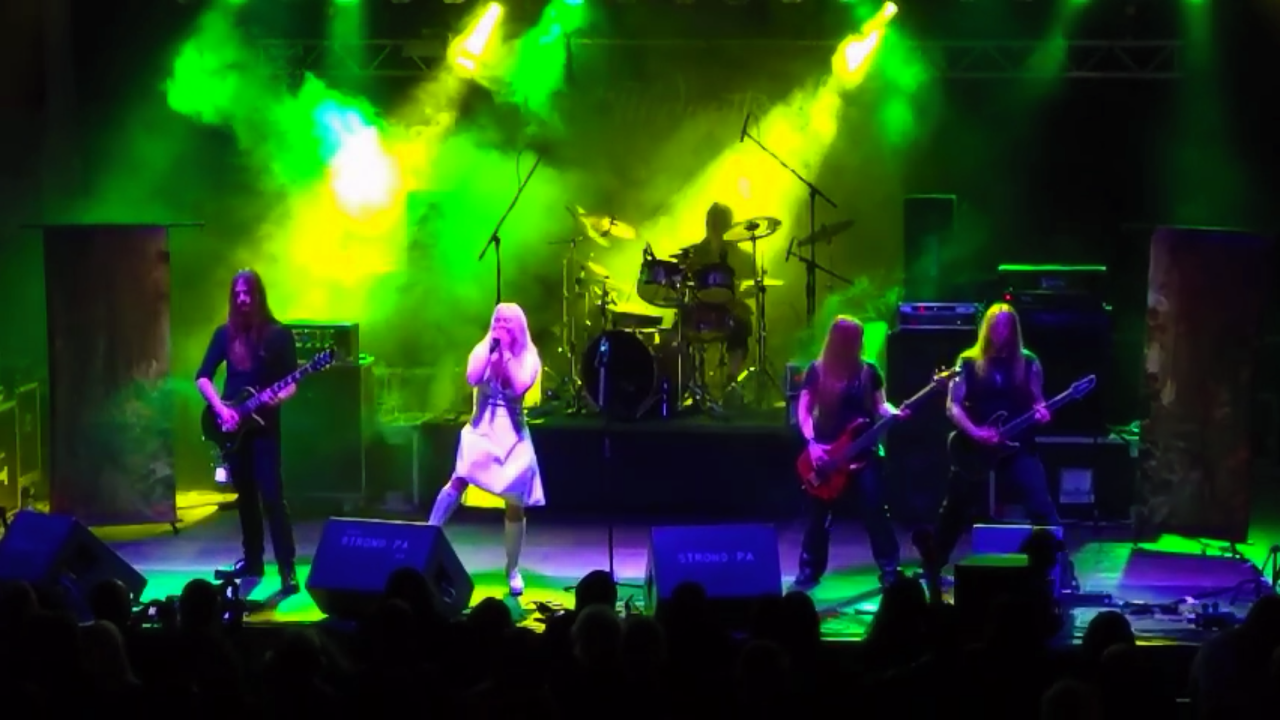
- Midnattsol at the Ragnarök Festival in Lichtenfels, Bavaria in 2013

Background information
- Origin: Ludwigsburg, Baden-Württemberg, Germany
- Genres: Gothic metal, folk metal, symphonic metal
- Years active: 2002–present
- Labels: Napalm
- Members: Carmen Elise Espenæs; Alex Kautz; Daniel Fischer; Stephan Adolph; Liv Kristine
- Past members: Christian Fütterer Christian Hector Fabian "Fabz" Pospiech Daniel Droste Birgit Öllbrunner Matthias Schuler Chris Merzinsky

Midnattsol are a gothic/folk metal band from Germany. The band was founded in 2002 by Norwegian vocalist Carmen Elise Espenæs and German guitarist Christian Hector. The band's name is a modified spelling of the Norwegian word midnattssol, which means 'midnight sun'.

== History ==
=== Founding and Where Twilight Dwells (2002–2007) ===
Lead singer Carmen Elise Espenæs (born on September 30, 1983, in Stavanger, Norway) had some kind of musical training in her native hometown, and began singing in some local non-professional bands, with whom she began writing her first songs at the same time.

In 2002, at the age of 19, Espenæs moved to Ludwigsburg, Germany and sought to develop a musical project. She stayed with her older sister Liv Kristine who, at the time, was in Theatre of Tragedy (a metal band). While Kristine was married to Alexander Krull, Espenæs collaborated frequently with their later band Leaves' Eyes.

Simultaneously, Espenæs met guitarist Christian Hector and together founded Midnattsol. They intended to start working on a new project once they found like-minded musicians to join their band.

The other members of the first Midnattsol lineup were three of Hector's former bandmates in Penetralia, a gothic/black metal band from Mosbach, disbanded in 2001: drummer Chris Merzinsky, keyboardist Daniel Fischer and guitarist Daniel Droste (who replaced Christian Fütterer in 2003), while the bassist Birgit Öllbrunner (ex- Commander) was added slightly later.

With this formation, the band recorded a demo financed by themselves in 2003 (self-titled Midnattsol, containing two original songs) and got a record contract with Napalm Records in 2004, with which they released all their albums to date. Espenæs wrote most of the band's lyrics, and contributed to the musical composition.

Their first full-length album, Where Twilight Dwells, was released on January 31, 2005, and was produced by Alexander Krull. This work contains nine previously unreleased tracks, and includes the two songs re-recorded and renamed that appear in their 2003 demo, as well as the same ghostly cover artwork by illustrator Ingo Römling. The sound is essentially symphonic metal with influences from folk metal and power metal. The band prefers to call their style "Nordic folk metal" because of the folk elements in their music and occasional Norwegian lyrics. Their lyrics are largely based on Norwegian folk tales.

On December 9, 2005, ZYX Music released the split video on DVD Feuertanz Festival 2005, with Midnattdol as the first act of six German bands that performed live on that show.

=== Nordlys (2008–2010) ===
Their next album, Nordlys, was released on March 28, 2008. After three years of the release of their well-received debut album, Midnattsol decided change direction and to compose an album with dark atmospheres in a melodic and heavy sound, influenced more closely by traditional gothic metal. In contrast, Nordlys is little inspired by Nordic folk metal and it is less introspective that its predecessor.

Particularly noteworthy is the experimentation in the soprano vocals of their lead singer Carmen Ellise Espenæs, as well as the extensive dedication in the guitar solos of Daniel Droste and Christian Hector. However, Hector (a founding member), left the group shortly after the release of the album in order to concentrate on his other band Ahab, a German funeral doom metal band founded in 2004 by Hector and Droste. Hector was briefly replaced by Fabian Pospiech in the three live performances that made Midnattsol in Europe to promote the album.

The band won the "Best Hope" award at the Metal Female Voices Fest 2009 due to the majority of votes by the fans. In spring 2010 they announced their return to the studio to record their third album, with updates for fans via studio reports on YouTube posted on their official Twitter.

=== The Metamorphosis Melody (2011–2017) ===
The third album The Metamorphosis Melody was released on April 22, 2011. It was recorded with Alex Kautz as the new Midnattsol guitarist, who joined the band shortly after the release of their previous album Nordlys in 2008, replacing to Fabian Pospiech.

Later, guitarist and composer Daniel Droste left the band after the recording sessions for the album that finished in 2010 to focus solely on his own band Ahab. To replace him, joined Matthias Schuler as official member for the respective European promotional tour, made between April and October 2011.

The Metamorphosis Melody goes back to its symphonic Nordic sound and includes some themes inspired by Norwegian folk tales, with soothing vocals coming from the voice of Carmen Elise Espenæs, but less operatic.

After a year and a half of inactivity, in April 2013 Midnattsol was invited for second time since 2010 to the Ragnarök Festival, held in Lichtenfels, Bavaria.

In June 2013 it was announced that Espenæs, with The Sins of Thy Beloved members Anders Thue and Stig Johansen, formed the band called Savn. That band released a self-titled album in 2014. Meanwhile, Midnattsol was on a long break between 2013 and 2017.

=== The Aftermath (2017–present) ===
In March 2017, guitarist Stephan Adolph joined as a new member. Adolph had already worked with Midnattsol on their debut album Where Twilight Dwells. Previously, bassist Birgit Öllbrunner, drummer Chris Merzinsky and guitarist Matthias Schuler left the band for personal reasons before the recording sessions for the new album began at the end of 2017.

On December 14, 2017, it was announced that Liv Kristine had become the official second vocalist for Midnattsol, she was originally announced to be a guest on their new album but after some discussions, the band added her as a permanent member. Their fourth studio album, The Aftermath, was released on May 25, 2018.

Lyrically, in comparison to all its distant predecessors, The Aftermath has much more Nordic folk influences, including gothic metal songs with a somber social content.

Meanwhile, Chris Merzinsky and Birgit Öllbrunner also play in the thrash/groove metal band R:I:P, among other German groups.

== Members ==
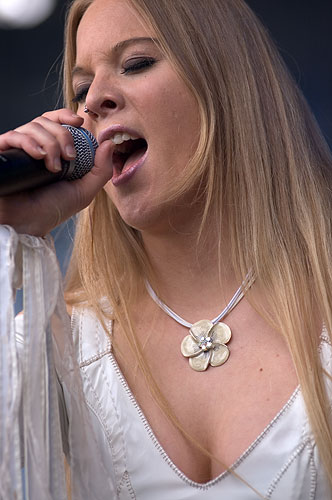
Singer Carmen Elise Espenæs

=== Current line-up ===
- Carmen Elise Espenæs – vocals (2002–present)
- Daniel Fischer – keyboards (2002–present)
- Alex Kautz – guitars (2009–present)
- Stephan Adolph – guitars, bass, vocals, drums (2017–present)
- Liv Kristine – vocals (2017–present)

=== Former members ===
- Christian Fütterer – guitars (2002)
- Christian Hector – guitars (2002–2008)
- Fabian "Fabz" Pospiech – guitars (2008–2009)
- Daniel Droste – guitars (2003–2010)
- Birgit Öllbrunner – bass (2002–2017)
- Chris Merzinsky – drums (2002–2017)
- Matthias Schuler – guitars (2011–2017)

Timeline

== Discography ==
Demo albums

- Midnattsol (2003)

Studio albums

- Where Twilight Dwells (2005)
- Nordlys (2008)
- The Metamorphosis Melody (2011)
- The Aftermath (2018)

== Videography ==
Live DVDs

- En natt i Wieze (included as bonus DVD in The Metamorphosis Melody limited edition, 2011)

Music videos

- "Kong Valemons kamp" (2011)
- "Herr Mannelig" (2018)
- "The Purple Sky" (2018)
