= Helrunar =

German metal band

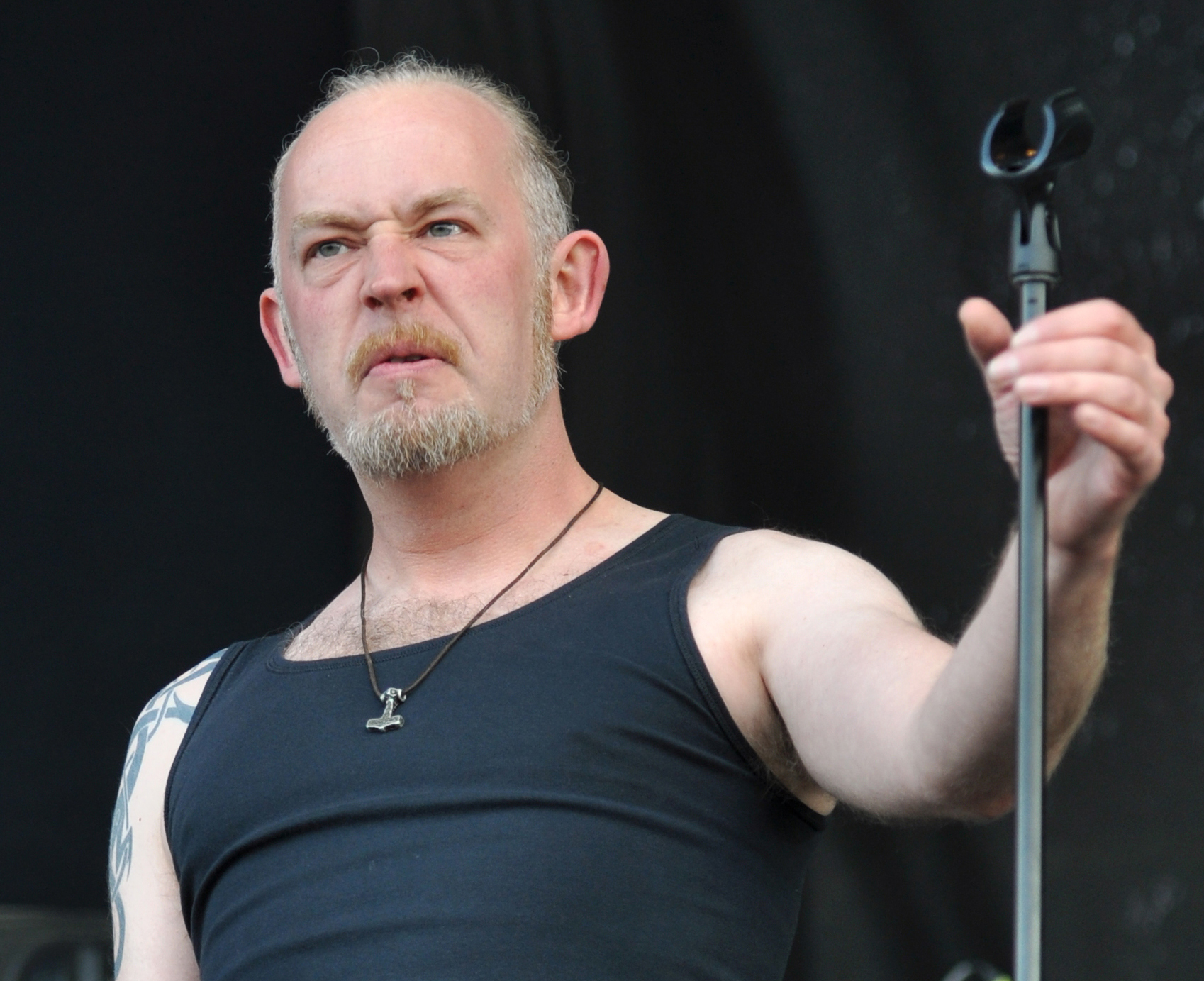
- Helrunar at Party.San Metal Open Air 2013

Background information
- Origin: Münster, Germany
- Genres: Black metal Pagan metal Viking metal
- Years active: 2001–present
- Labels: Prophecy Productions; Lupus Lounge
- Members: Skald Draugir; Alsvartr
- Past members: Dionysos

Helrunar is a German pagan metal band from Münster, founded in 2001. They played at the Summer Breeze Open Air in August 2007, and at the pagan metal Ragnarök Festival in 2008.

== Line-up ==
=== Current members ===
- Skald Draugir – vocals (2001–present)
- Alsvartr – drums, guitar, bass (2001–present)

=== Former members ===
- Dionysos – guitar (2001–2008)

== Discography ==
- Grátr (demo, 2003)
- Helrunar/Nachtmahr (split with the German band Nachtmahr, 2005)
- Frostnacht (2005)
- Baldr ok íss (2007)
- Sól (2011)
- Fragments – A Mythological Excavation (split with Árstíðir Lífsins, 2012)
- Wein für Polyphem (2013)
- Niederkunfft (2015)
- Vanitas vanitatvm (2018)
