= Riger =

Riger is the surname of the following notable people:

- Gennady Riger (1948–2015), Israeli politician
- Robert Riger (1924–1995), American sports illustrator, photographer, television director and cinematographer

== See also ==
- Rigger
