= Where Twilight Dwells =

Studio album by Midnattsol
- Released: 31 January 2005
- Recorded: Mastersound Studios, Fellbach, Germany, 2003 – 2004; SAD Studio (keyboards)
- Genres: Gothic metal, folk metal
- Length: 51:17
- Languages: English, Norwegian
- Label: Napalm
- Producers: Alexander Krull, Midnattsol

Midnattsol chronology
Midnattsol (2003)	Where Twilight Dwells (2005)	Nordlys (2008)

Professional ratings
Review scores
Source	Rating
Metal Storm	8/10 stars

Where Twilight Dwells is the debut full-length studio album by the German symphonic/folk metal band Midnattsol. It was released on 31 January 2005 through Napalm Records.

== Background ==
Where Twilight Dwells is a continuation of their 2003 demo Midnattsol (released only in Germany), from which takes its two songs in form re-recorded and renamed, as well as its ghostly cover art illustrated by Ingo Römling. The rest of the album includes nine previously unreleased and original songs, composed mainly by their lead singer Carmen Elise Espenæs.

The sound is essentially Gothic metal with influences from folk metal, or "Nordic folk metal" in the own words of the band, because of the folk elements in their music and occasional Norwegian lyrics. Their lyrics are largely based on Norwegian folk tales.

The lyrics and main melody of the song "Tapt av håp" are taken from Edvard Grieg's classical piece Solveig's Song.

== Track listing ==
All lyrics are written by Carmen Elise Espenæs, except for "Lament", by Christian Hector and "Tapt Av Håp", written by Henrik Ibsen.

No.	Title	Music	Length
1.	"Another Return"	Daniel Droste, Espenæs, Hector & Midnattsol	5:03
2.	"Lament"	Droste, Hector & Midnattsol	4:07
3.	"Unpayable Silence"	Droste, Espenæs & Midnattsol	5:04
4.	"Haunted"	Hector, Chris Merzinsky & Midnattsol	3:24
5.	"Desolation"	Midnattsol	4:22
6.	"Enlightenment"	Droste, Espenæs, Hector & Midnattsol	4:07
7.	"Tårefall" ("Tearfall")	Droste, Espenæs	4:23
8.	"Infinite Fairytale"	Midnattsol	4:46
9.	"På Leting" ("Searching")	Espenæs, Christian Fütterer, Hector & Midnattsol	4:07
10.	"Dancing With The Midnight Sun"	Espenæs, Daniel Fischer, Hector, Merzinsky & Midnattsol	3:58
11.	"Tapt Av Håp" ("The Loss of Hope")	Edvard Grieg, intro and outro by Droste & Midnattsol	7:56
Total length:			51:17

- The songs "Dancing with the Midnight Sun" and "Desolation" are re-recorded and renamed versions of 2003 Midnattsol demo songs "Dancing in the Midnight Sun" and "Desolate".

== Personnel ==
=== Midnattsol ===
- Carmen Elise Espenæs – Vocals
- Birgit Öllbrunner – Bass
- Daniel Droste – Guitars, Acoustic Guitars
- Christian Hector – Guitars, Acoustic Guitars, Mouth Harp
- Daniel Fischer – Keyboards
- Chris Merzinsky – Drums

=== Production ===
- Alexander Krull - producer, engineering, mixing, mastering
- Martin Schmidt, Mathias Röderer, Thorsten Bauer - assistant engineers
- Stephan Adolph - keyboards recording engineer
- Birgit Öllbrunner, Chris Merzinsky - mixing
- Fabian Ritter - artwork design and layout
- Daniel Fischer, Bernd Hector - photography (landscape)
- Katja Piolka - photography (cover)
- Jens Howorka - photography (band)
- Ingo Römling - cover art
