= Who Can Sail Without the Wind? =

Swedish folk song and lullaby

Who Can Sail Without the Wind? (Swedish: Vem kan segla förutan vind?, lit. 'Who can sail without wind?') is a Swedish-language folk song and lullaby known from Swedish speaking areas in modern-day Finland, assumed to originate from the Åland-islands between Finland and Sweden in the Baltic Sea. The opening line is found in the fifth stanza of an 18th-century ballad, "Goder natt, goder natt, allra kärestan min" and in its current form the song was first published in 1909. The song relates to a theme that is common in seaman's songs – to be separated from those you love.

The English name of the song varies: "Who Can Sail Without Wind", "Who Can Sail Without a Wind", "I Can Sail Without The Wind", etc.

== Lyrics ==
Strophes	Swedish	English
Strophe 1	Vem kan segla förutan vind, vem kan ro utan åror, vem kan skiljas från vännen sin utan att fälla tårar?	Who can sail without the wind, who can row without oars, who can leave a parting friend without shedding tears?
Strophe 2	Jag kan segla förutan vind, jag kan ro utan åror, men ej skiljas från vännen min utan att fälla tårar.	I can sail without the wind, I can row without oars, but I can't leave a parting friend without shedding tears.
