= Obscurity (band) =

German extreme metal band

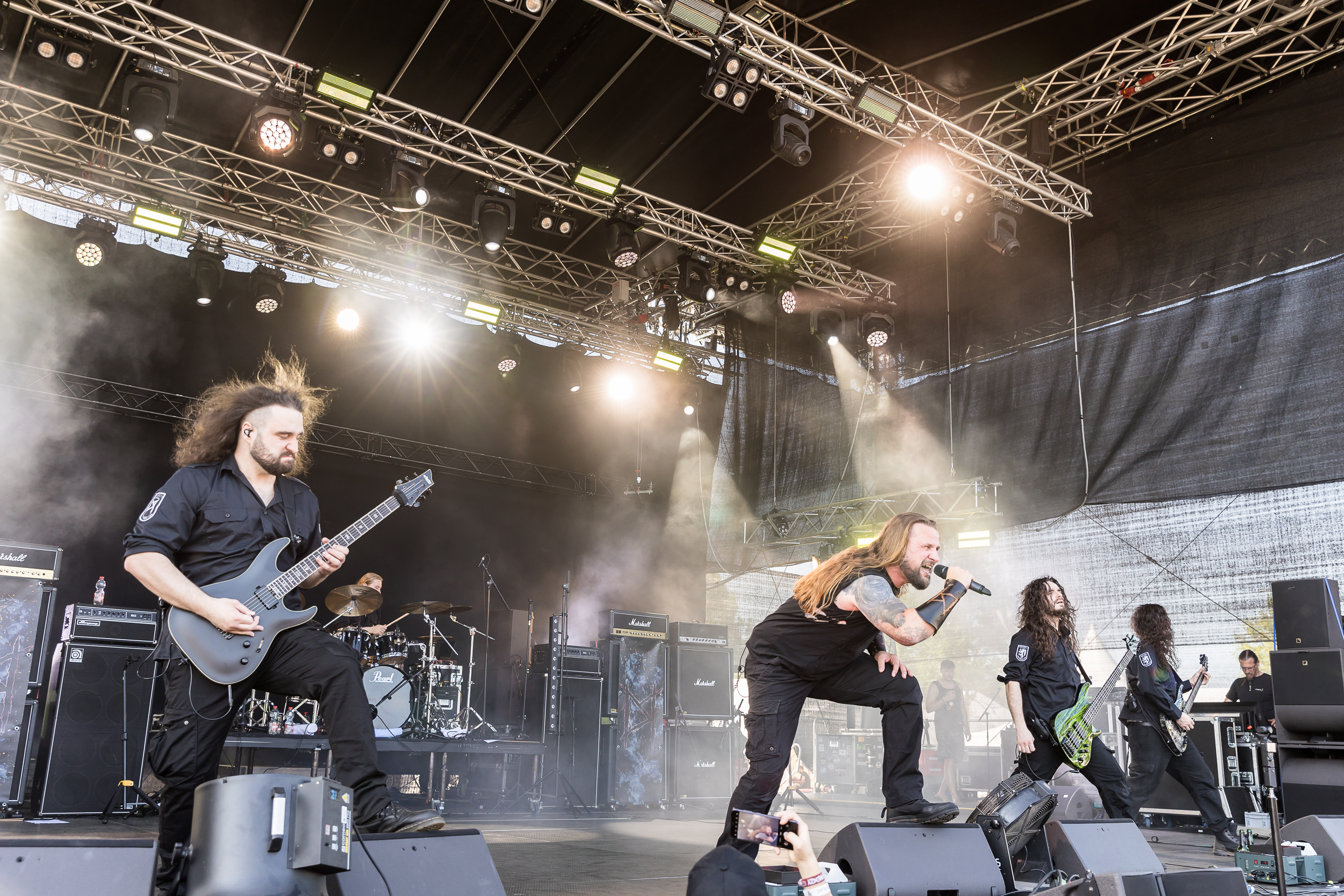
- Obscurity at Metal Frenzy 2025

Background information
- Origin: Velbert, Germany
- Genres: Melodic death metal; melodic black metal; Viking metal
- Years active: 1997–present
- Labels: Massacre, SMP
- Members: Agalaz; Dornaz; Ziu; Askar; Zorn
- Past members: Nezrac; Cortez; Arganar; Draugr
- Website: obscurity-online.de

Obscurity is a German melodic death/black metal band with strong Viking metal influences hailing from Velbert, a city in the Bergisches Land in North Rhine-Westphalia. They are one of the early German death, black, Viking, and pagan metal bands.

== History ==
Obscurity was formed by Agalaz (guitar), Arganar (drums), Nezrac (vocals), Dornaz (guitar) and Ziu (bass) in 1997. The five founding members had already known each other for years before deciding to make their own contribution to metal.

They picked the name Obscurity because in their formative years their musical style could not be clearly assigned to a specific metal genre. Since "obscurity" means 'darkness' as well as 'lack of clarity', it is an apt description of their comprehensive musical scope. This is even emphasised by the Viking metal influences which they developed at a very early stage. Bands playing this kind of metal often choose names originating from Nordic mythology, so the band name is unusual, but it is representative.

Obscurity identifies strongly with the Bergisches Land and use the Bergisch Lion, the heraldic emblem of the counts and subsequent dukes of Berg who ruled there in the Middle Ages, as a 'trademark' which features on almost all their releases.

In 2003, founding member Dornaz left Obscurity. He is still a 'stand-by' member of the band and also shared the stage with them on their 10-year anniversary. After Dornaz' departure experienced guitarist and longtime friend Cortez took up his position. Through his joining of the band they gained more heft and enlarged their musical spectrum.

The same year, the band signed a distribution contract with Twilight for their album Thurisaz.

In 2006, the band signed a new record and distribution deal with Massacre Records for the follow-up album Schlachten & Legenden.

In 2007 Obscurity celebrated their 10-year anniversary. The album Schlachten & Legenden was released in April and distributed by Massacre Records/Soulfood.

In 2008, shouter Nezrac left the band. The same year the group signed a new record contract with the music label SMP/Trollzorn.

The album Várar hit stores in March 2009, being distributed by SMP Records/Soulfood. It was originally planned as a theme album celebrating the 2,000-year anniversary of the Battle of the Teutoburg Forest. The same year, Dornaz returned to the band.

== Lyrics and musical style ==
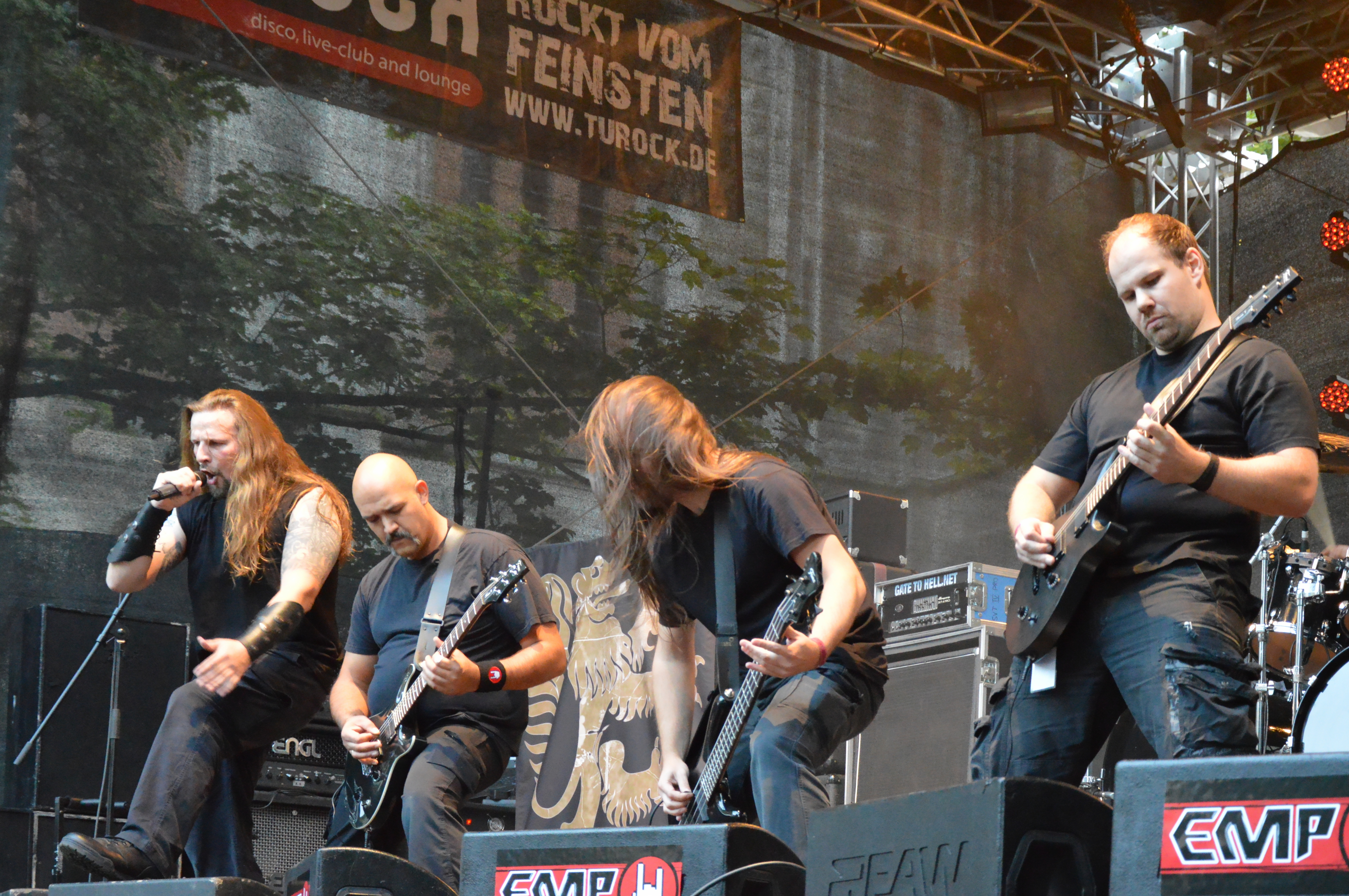
Obscurity performing in 2013

=== Lyrics ===
Obscurity's lyrical themes range from the martial and warlike to themes derived from Nordic mythology and also include pure fiction. In their early days they also used lyrics that were typically black metal. Political themes, however, have never been of any significance for the band and, therefore, never taken up. Their lyrics are mostly in German.

=== Musical style ===
During their first years Obscurity mainly played death/black metal with some Viking metal influences. Since 1998, Viking metal aspects have been exerting a more and more dominating influence on the band which is primarily displayed in their lyrics as well as in some musical elements. Their musical direction today is a mix of melodic death metal and black metal enriched with strong Viking metal influences and also possessing some thrash metal features. Obscurity confines themselves to playing traditional metal instruments (drums, guitars, bass). Other instruments which are frequently used in pagan metal, like keyboards, violins and flutes and medieval gear, are intentionally not employed. Their music is very fast, heavy, and spiked with hymn-like melodies. The band's sound is sometimes very cold and brutal, yet harmonic and an emphasis is placed on production. It is deeply rooted in the "underground" but still very catchy.

Obscurity are often compared with bands like Amon Amarth, Naglfar, Dissection and Unleashed. With regard to some of the Obscurity's musical elements also Bathory or Immortal are mentioned as references.

From 1997 to 2008, all recordings of demos and albums, layouts, etc. were solely self-financed and self-produced by Obscurity. The band refuse to let their responsibility and freedom of artistic expression be taken away by contracts of any kind. Both of their distribution and record contracts were only agreed to after completion of the albums. It was only for their four official records that they got an experienced producer/co-producer on board – Bony (shouter of Japanische Kampfhörspiele), a longtime friend and companion of the band.

Obscurity have explicitly distanced themselves from any politically extremist views in the metal scene, saying that those involved in metal should combat Nazism and right-wing extremism in general. They vehemently express this position in their booklets, through interview statements, in announcements during live gigs and even in one of their songs.

== Members ==
Band members at the Dark Troll Festival 2018

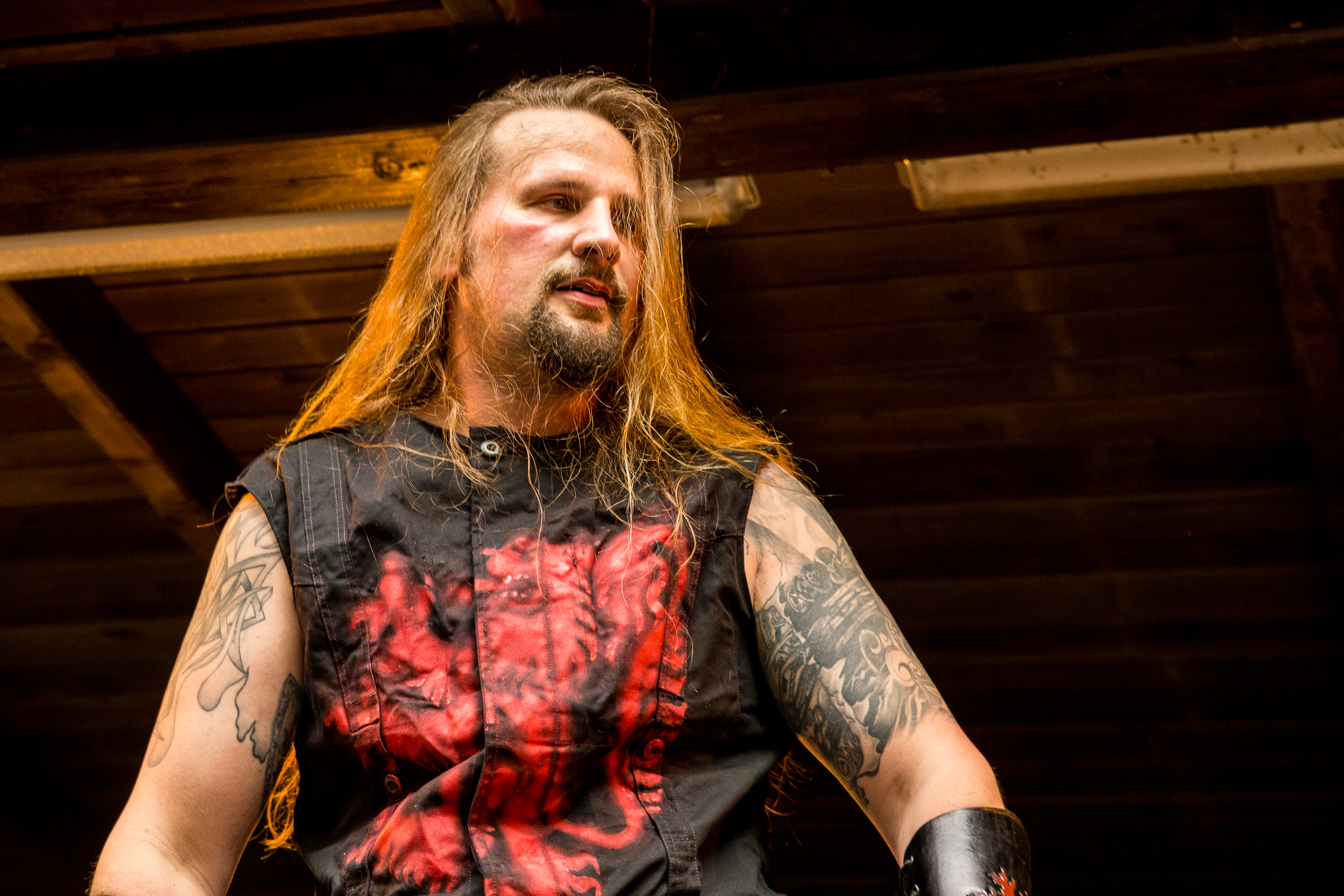
Singer Agalaz

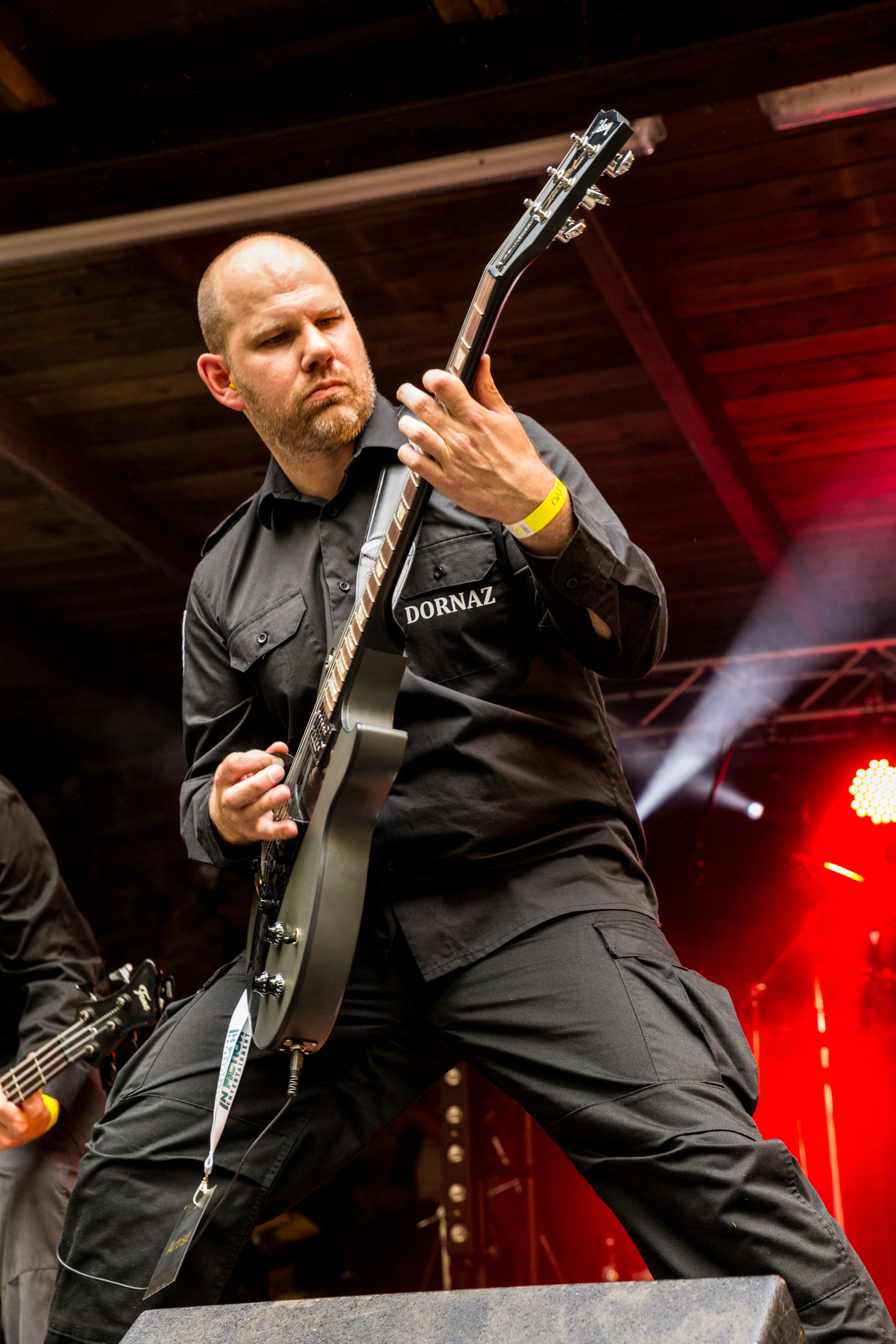
Guitarist Dornaz

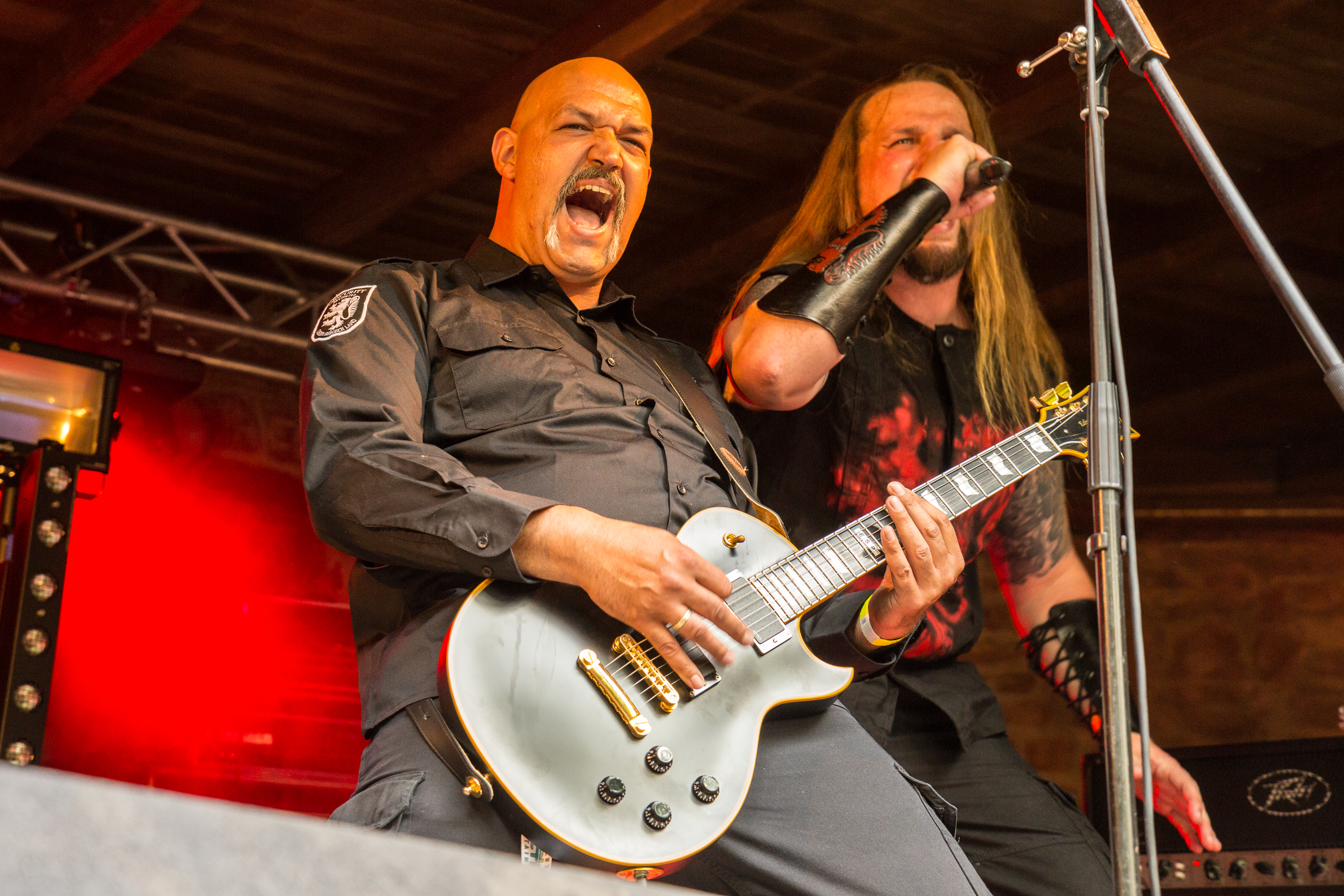
Guitarist Cortez

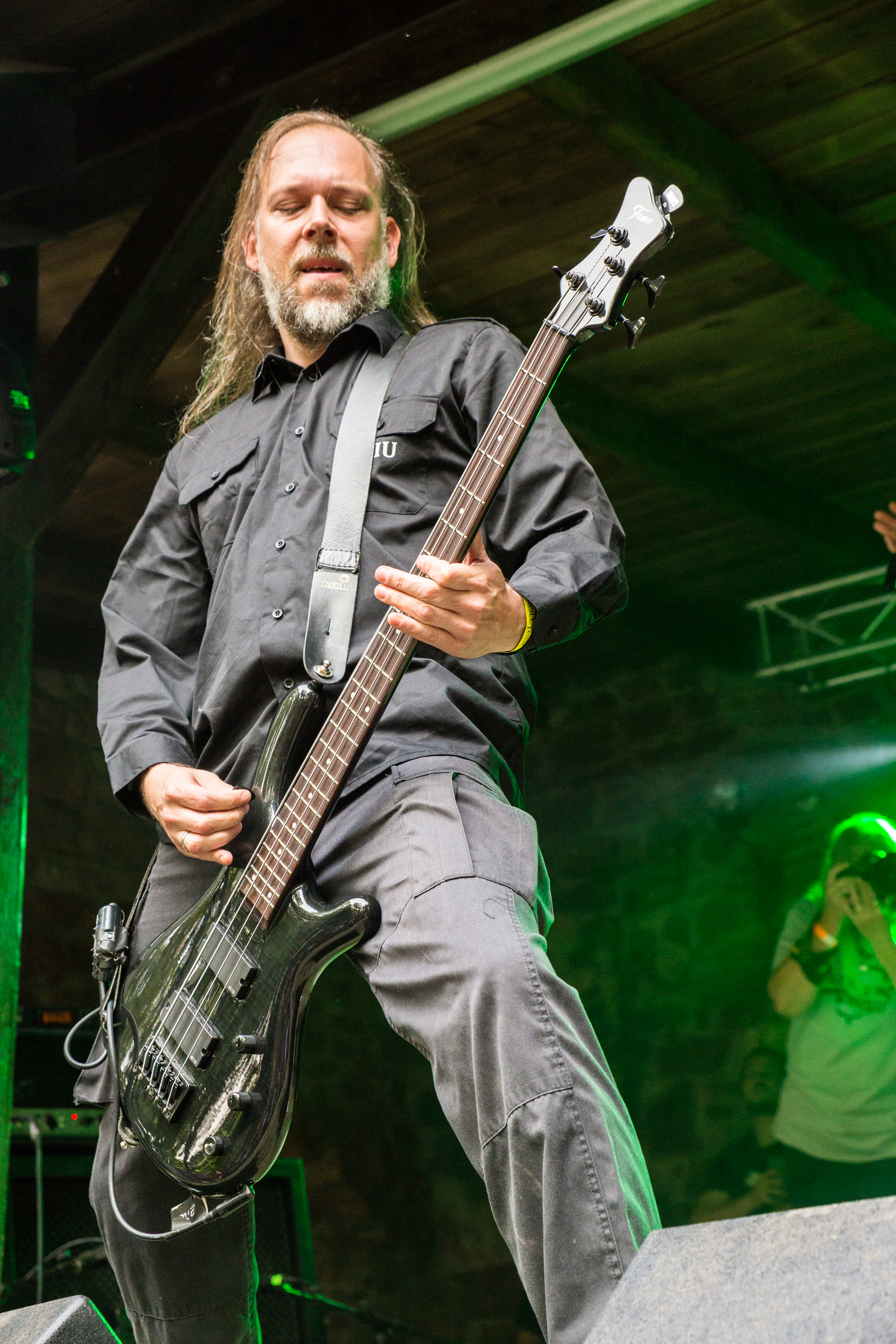
Bass guitarist Ziu

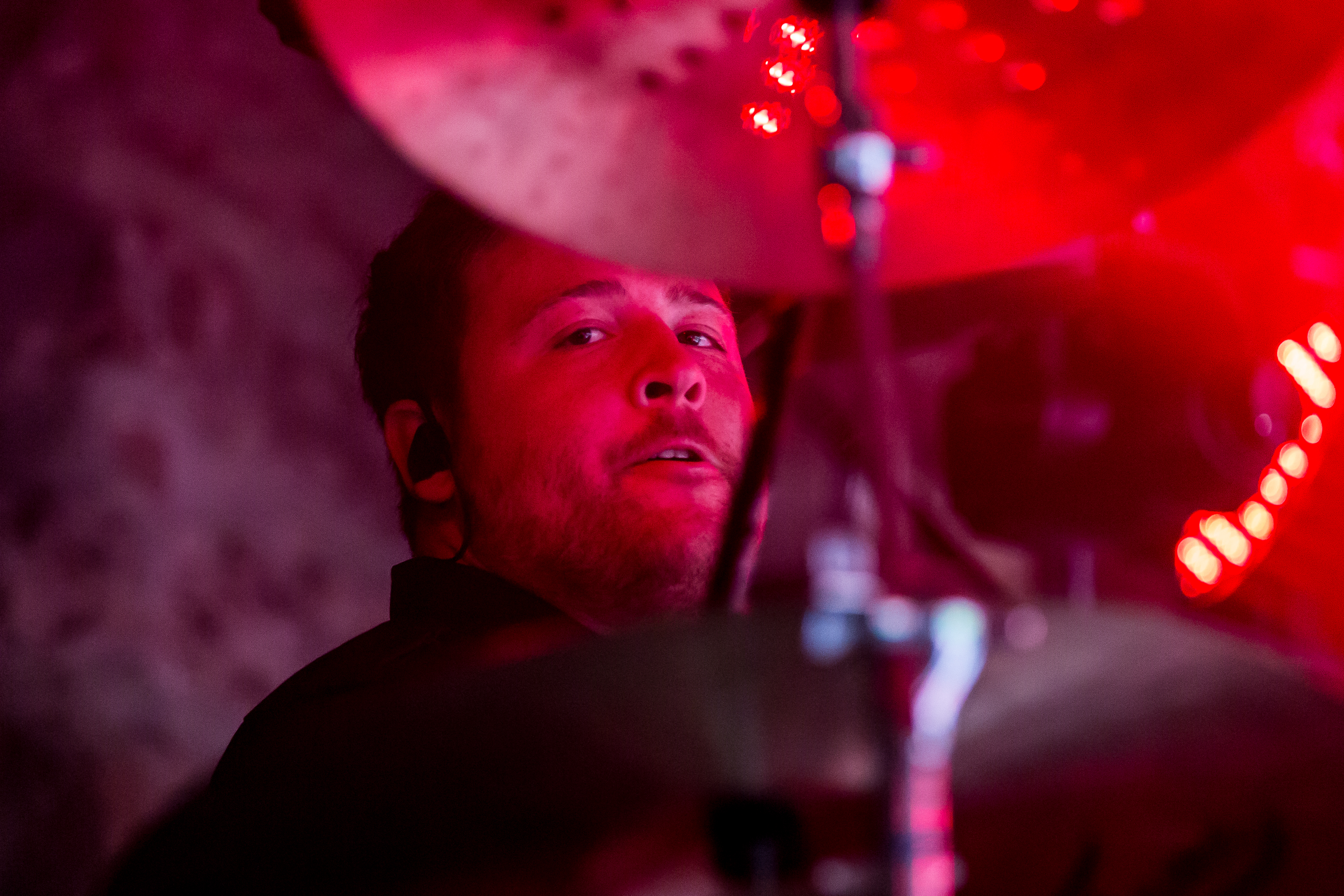
Drummer Draugr

=== Current ===
- Agalaz – guitars (1997–2009), vocals (2008–present)
- Dornaz – guitars (1997–2004, 2009–present)
- Askar – guitars (2018–present)
- Ziu – bass (1997–present)
- Zorn – drums (2018–present)

=== Former ===
- Nezrac – vocals (1997–2008)
- Arganar – drums (1997–2016)
- Cortez – guitars (2004–2018)
- Draugr – drums (2016–2018)

== Discography ==
- Bergisch Land (2000)
- Thurisaz (2003)
- Schlachten & Legenden (2007)
- Várar (2009)
- Tenkterra (2010)
- Obscurity (2012)
- Vintar (2014)
- Streitmacht (2017)
- Skogarmaors (2021)
