= Imperium Dekadenz =

German black metal band

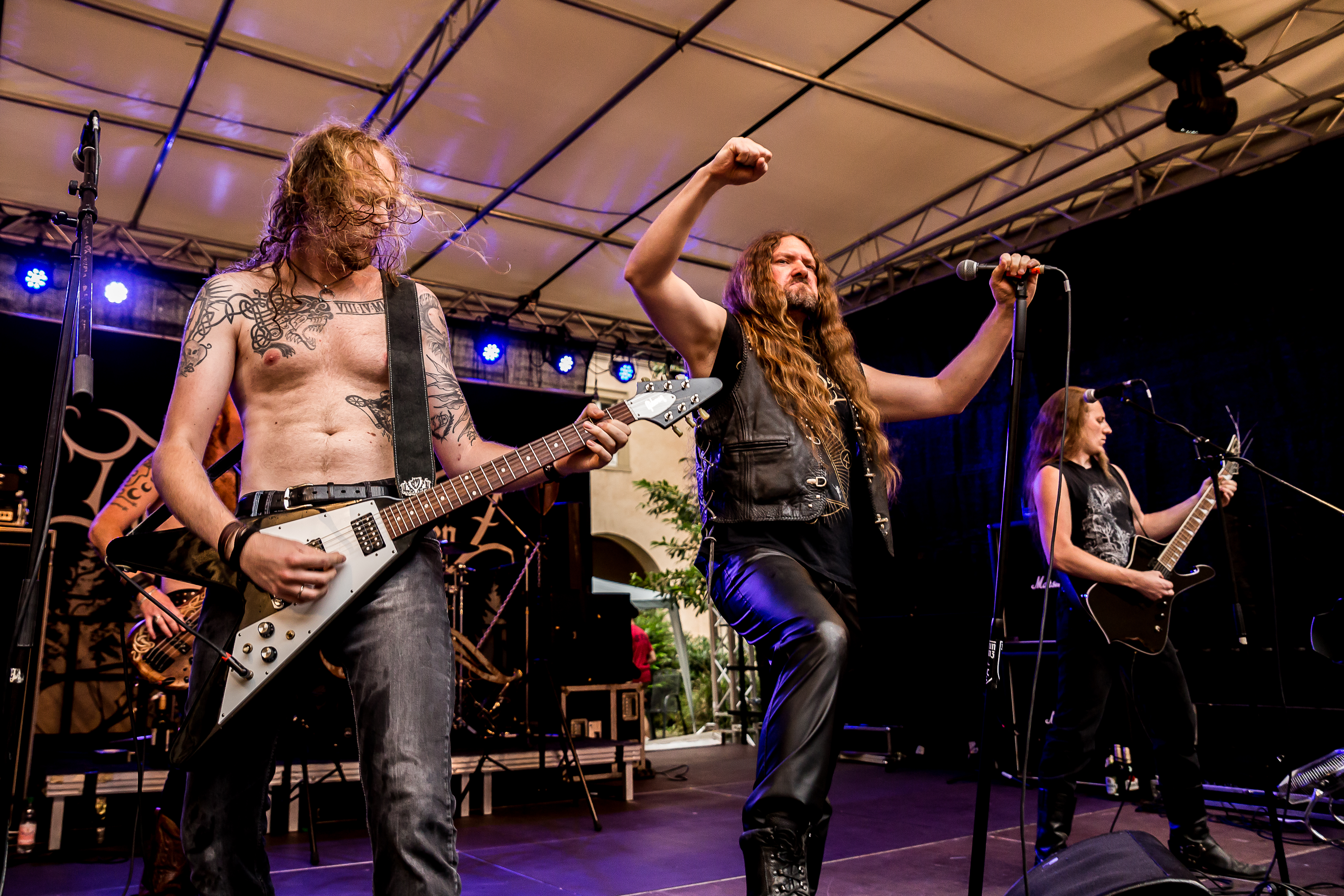
- Imperium Dekadenz performing at Skaldenfest 2018

Background information
- Origin: Villingen-Schwenningen, Germany
- Genre: Black metal
- Years active: 2004-present
- Labels: Perverted Taste; Season of Mist; Napalm Records
- Members: Pascal "Vespasian" Vannier; Christian "Horaz" Jakob
- Website: www.imperium-dekadenz.de

Imperium Dekadenz is a German black metal band formed in 2004. The band name is inspired by the 1979 film Caligula. The band members were fascinated by the violence and decadence portrayed in the film, as well as the pride in the Roman Empire it portrayed.

== History ==
Pascal "Vespasian" Vannier and Christian "Horaz" Jakob met in 2004 when Vespasian was looking for a ride to Wacken and Horaz offered him a seat in his car. During the car ride, Horaz played Vespasian from his demo tape Ax and the idea of making music together came up. In Winter 2005, they recorded their first work Promo 2005, together and sent it to different labels. Perverted Taste then offered them a record deal. In 2006, they released their first album ...und die Welt ward kalt und leer on the label. This was followed in 2007 by their second album Dämmerung der Szenarien.

In 2010, the band expressly distanced themselves from their old label, Perverted Taste, after finding out it included bands with right-wing extremist ideas in their distribution offer. Horaz said in this context that the lies of these people "extremely pissed him off" and that politics had no place in art. In the same year, they released their third album Procella Vadens on the French label Season of Mist.

In the concept album Meadows of Nostalgia, released in 2013, the band lyrically addressed their homeland, the Black Forest. In 2015, the band was portrayed as part of the reportage series "Kulturlandschaften" of the television channel 3sat. The show, hosted by Wladimir Kaminer, was first broadcast on 24 August 2015. In 2016, their album, Dis Manibvs was released. The album has the theme "To live and learn to die". In August 2018, the band signed an international record deal with Napalm Records. When We Are Forgotten was released on 30 August 2019.

In 2018, the song "Thru the Fog of Time" from the album Dämmerung der Szenarien was featured as an intro song of the RPG game Kingdom Come: Deliverance.

Their latest album, Into Sorrow Evermore was released on 20 January 2023.

== Members ==
=== Current ===
- Pascal "Vespasian" Vannier – guitar, bass, drums, keyboards, vocals (2004–present)
- Christian "Horaz" Jakob – guitar, keyboards, vocals (2004–present)

=== Live ===
- Christoph "Harvst" Brüderer – bass (2009–present)
- Dennis "Naavl" Schälicke – guitar (2009–present)
- Bastian "Kaelt" Brüderer – guitar (2009–present)

== Discography ==
- 2006: …und die Welt ward kalt und leer (Album, CD, Perverted Taste; 12"-Vinyl, Funeral Industries)
- 2007: Dämmerung der Szenarien (Album, CD, Perverted Taste; 12"-Vinyl, Funeral Industries)
- 2010: Procella Vadens (Album, CD, Season of Mist; 2xLP, Supreme Chaos Records)
- 2011: Imperium Dekadenz / Vargsheim (Split-EP mit Vargsheim, CD, Düsterwald Produktionen)
- 2013: Meadows of Nostalgia (Album, CD/2x12″-Vinyl, Season of Mist)
- 2016: Dis Manibvs (Album, CD/CD+DVD/2x12″-Vinyl/MC, Season of Mist)
- 2019: When We Are Forgotten (Album, CD/2xCD/2x12″-Vinyl, Napalm Records)
- 2023: Into Sorrow Evermore (Album, CD/LP, Napalm Records)
