= MS Nordlys =

Two motor ships have borne the name Nordlys:

- MS Nordlys (1950) was a 2,162-ton passenger/cargo ship launched on 28 July 1950, by Aalborg Vaerft in Aalborg, Denmark. Wrecked in a fire in Sarpsborg, Norway, on 13 April 1988. Sank while under tow to scrapping in Bilbao, Spain, on 31 May 1988.
- MS Nordlys (1993) is an 11,204-ton passenger/cargo ship launched on 13 August 1993, at Volkswerft GmbH, Stralsund, Germany.
