= Steinar Gundersen =

Norwegian guitarist

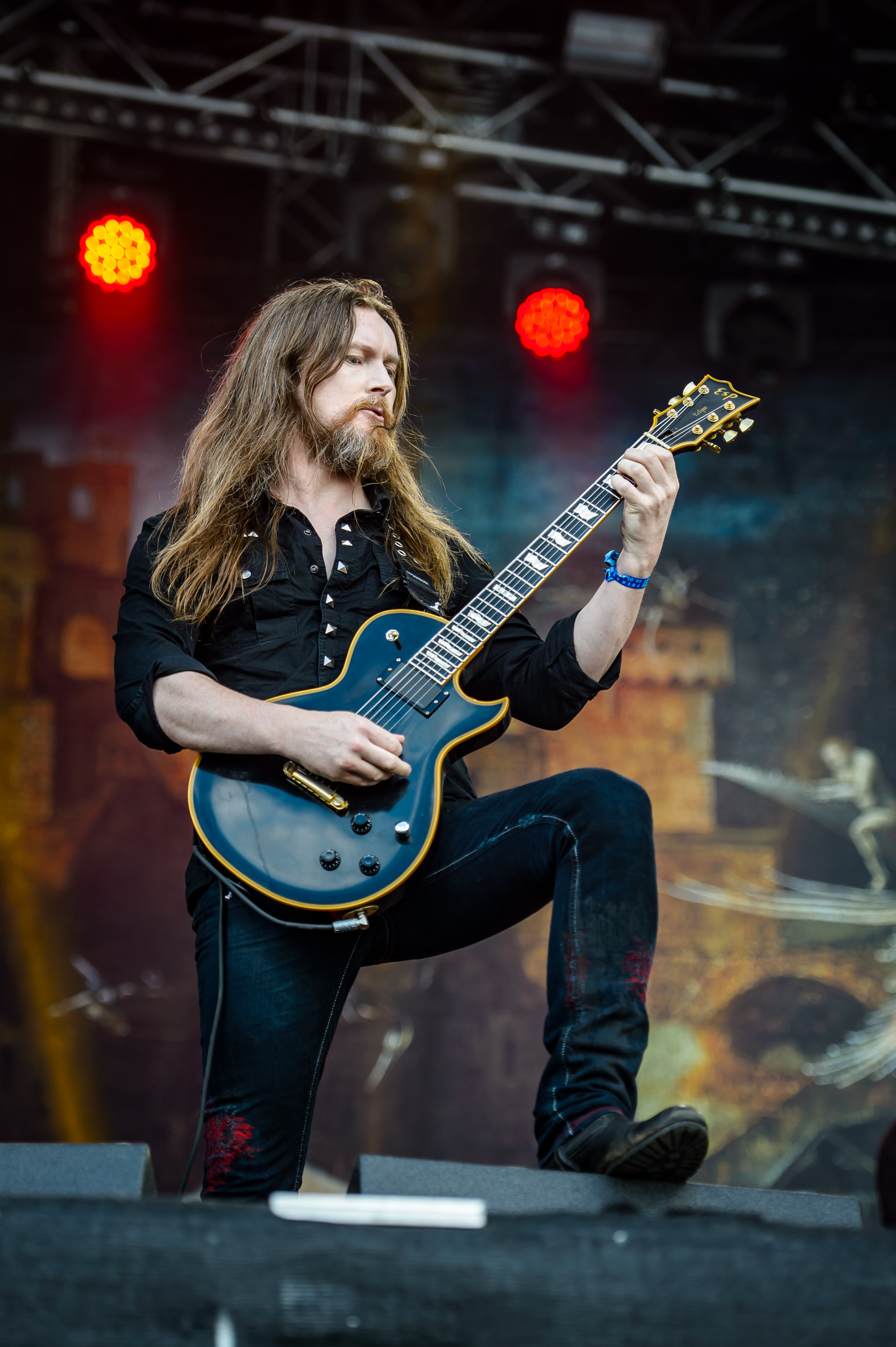
Gundersen with Satyricon in 2016

Steinar Gundersen (born 16 September 1970) is a guitarist from the small village of Oklungen, Norway. He plays live with the black metal band Satyricon as well as also having played lead guitar in the progressive metal band Spiral Architect. Gundersen has recently started a band called System:obscure, together with Bugge Wesseltoft.

== Bands involved in ==
- King's Quest (1988-1992)
- Spiral Architect (1992-)
- Lunaris (1999-2002)
- Satyricon (1999-)
- Sarke (2009-)
- ICS Vortex (As bass player, 2011-)
