= Ahab (band) =

German funeral doom metal band

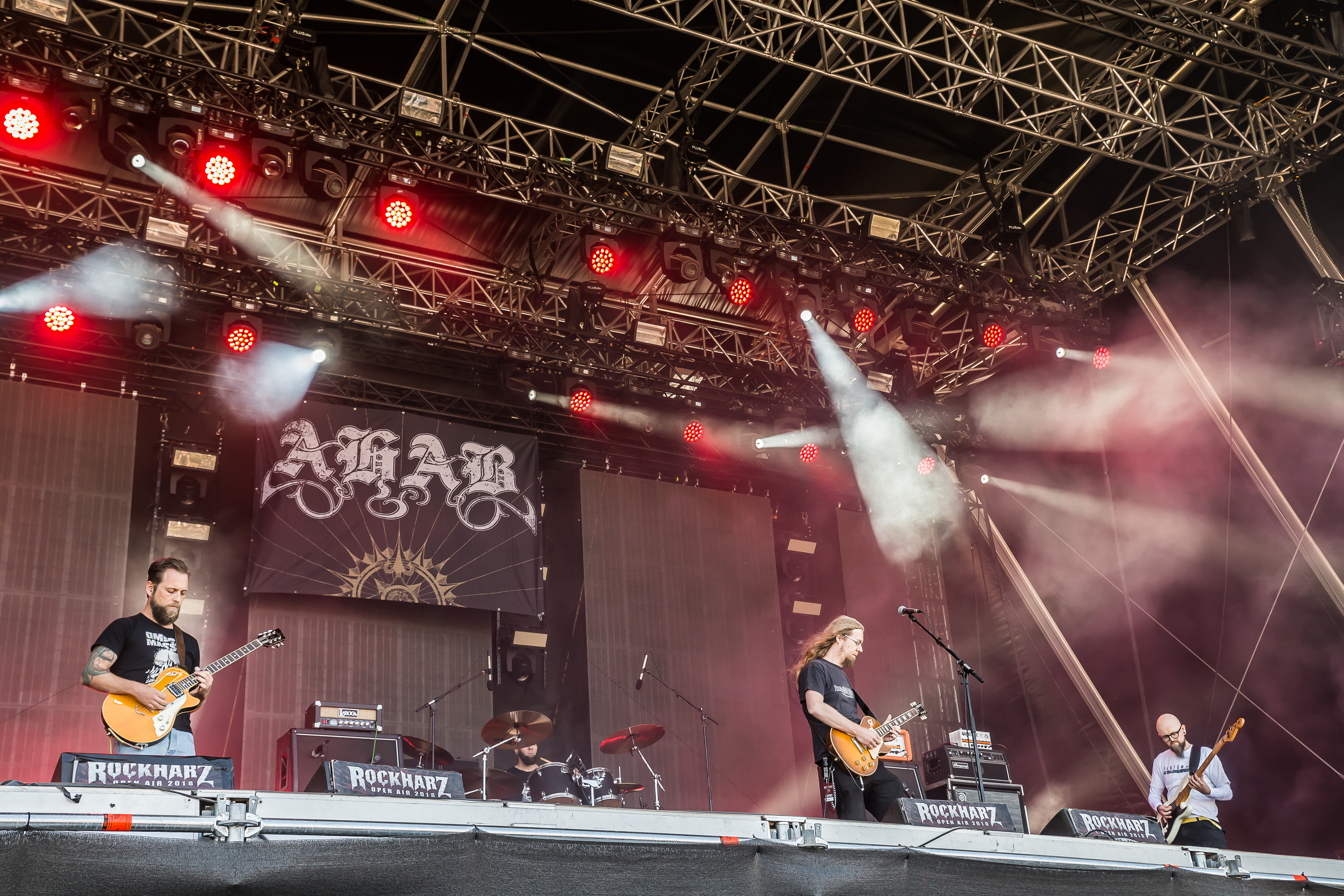
- Ahab at Rockharz Open Air 2018

Background information
- Origin: Germany
- Genres: Funeral doom, doom metal
- Years active: 2004–present
- Label: Napalm Records
- Members: Daniel Droste; Chris R. Hector; Cornelius Althammer; Stephan Wandernoth
- Past members: Stephan Adolph
- Website: ahab-doom.de

Ahab is a German funeral doom metal band founded in 2004 by Midnattsol guitarists Christian Hector and Daniel Droste. The band is named after Captain Ahab, a character in the 1851 novel Moby-Dick by Herman Melville. Along with its name, the band draws thematic and lyrical inspiration from Moby-Dick. Some songs directly quote the book.

Near the end of 2004, with one song already written, Christian Hector and Daniel Droste formed a band and recorded their first single, The Stream. On 15 April 2005, after several months of rehearsing, the band's first demo, The Oath, was released. The demo was limited to 30 hand-numbered copies and contained the band's first song, "The Stream", as well as two other songs and an outro. Nearly a year and a half later, The Call of the Wretched Sea, the group's first full-length album, was released on Napalm Records with then-new band member Stephan Adolph and session drummer Cornelius Althammer.

After the release of The Call of the Wretched Sea, the band played a few shows in Europe. In 2008, shortly after the Summer Breeze Open Air festival in Dinkelsbühl, Germany, bassist Stephan Adolph left the band due to "personal differences." He was replaced with Stephan Wandernoth, a member of the band Dead Eyed Sleeper, to which drummer Cornelius also belongs.

The band's next album, The Divinity of Oceans, was released in July 2009.

In April 2012, Ahab announced they would release their third studio album, The Giant, later in 2012. The announcement included the artwork and track listing.

Ahab released The Boats of the "Glen Carrig", on 28 August 2015. It is a concept album based on William Hope Hodgson's novel of the same name.

Ahab released their most recent album, The Coral Tombs, on Friday January the 13th 2023 and made the charts in the US. It follows Captain Nemo and Professor Aronnax through the depths of the sea and the nature of mankind.

To date, Ahab has released five studio albums and one live album and has performed across Europe. Several music gear manufactures currently endorse the band, including Neunaber Audio, LICHTLÆRM Audio, and ICE Stix.

== Discography ==
Studio albums

- The Call of the Wretched Sea (2006)
- The Divinity of Oceans (2009)
- The Giant (2012)
- The Boats of the "Glen Carrig" (2015)
- The Coral Tombs (2023)

EP

- The Oath (2005) (vinyl re-release 2007)

Demo

- The Stream (2004)

Live albums

- Live Prey (2020)

== Band members ==
=== Current members ===
- Daniel Droste – guitars, vocals, keyboards (2004–present)
- Christian Hector – guitars (2004–present)
- Cornelius Althammer – drums (2004–present)
- Stephan Wandernoth – bass (2008–present)
Ahab, Line-Up at Rockharz Open Air 2018

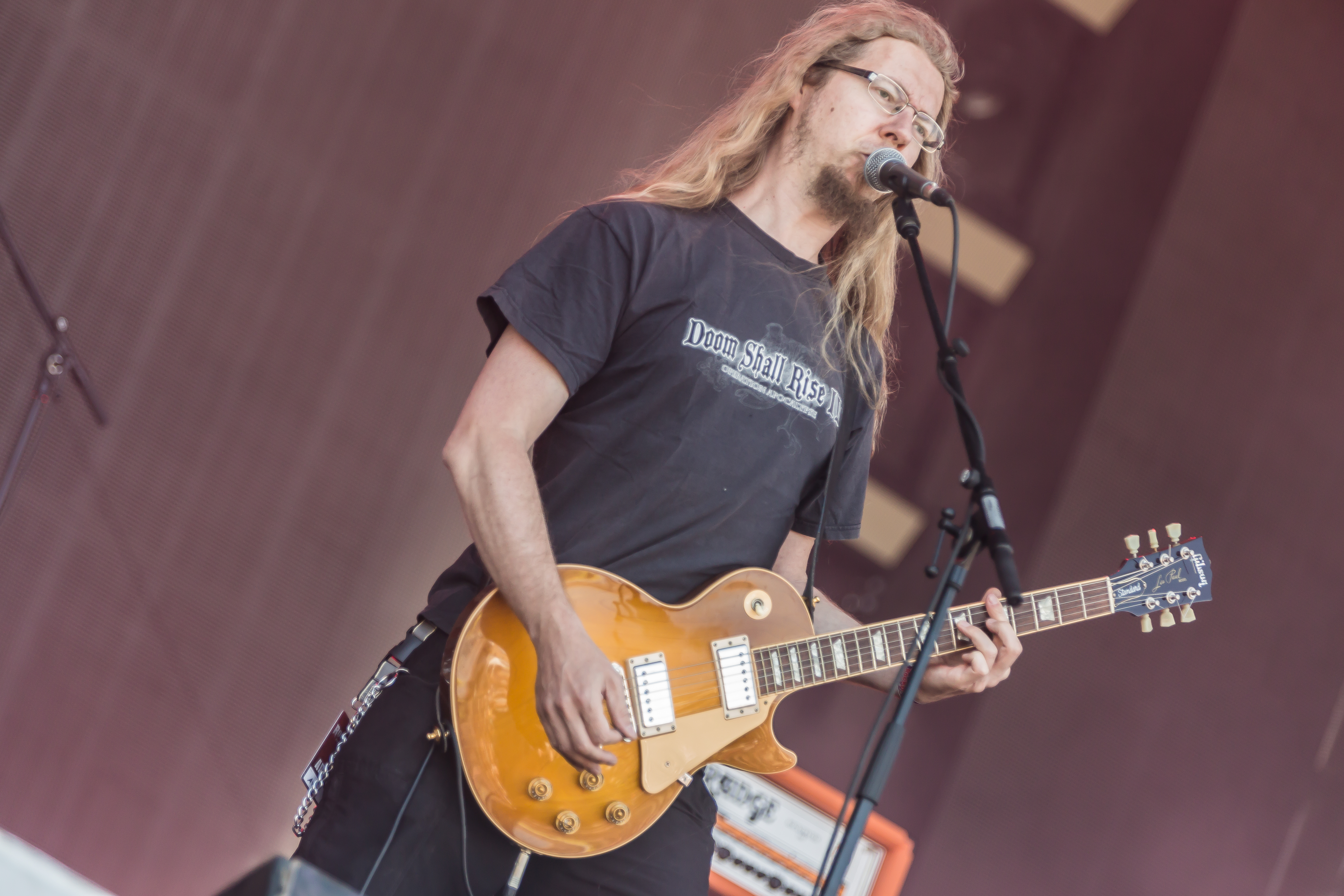
Singer Daniel Droste

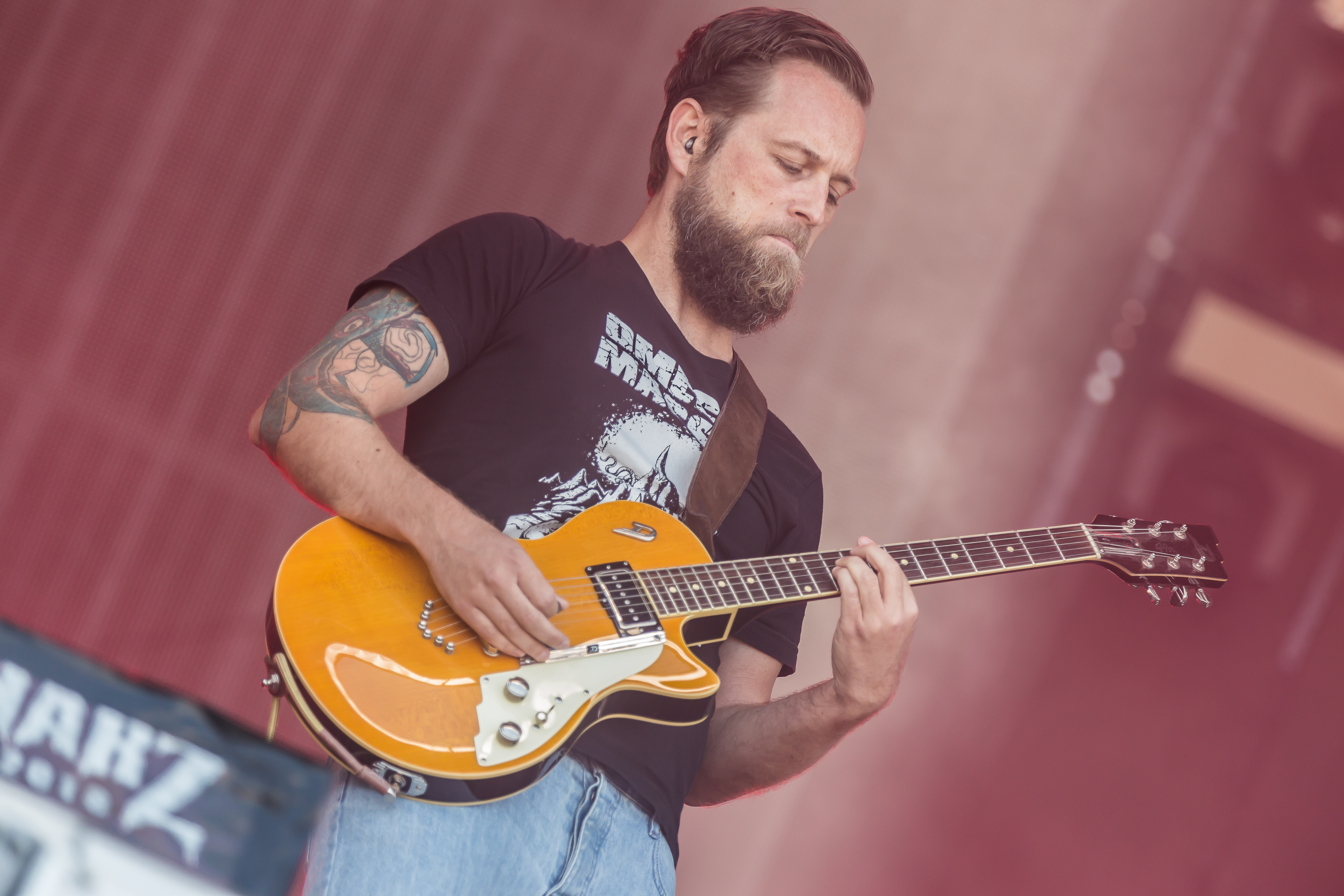
Guitarist Christian R. Hector

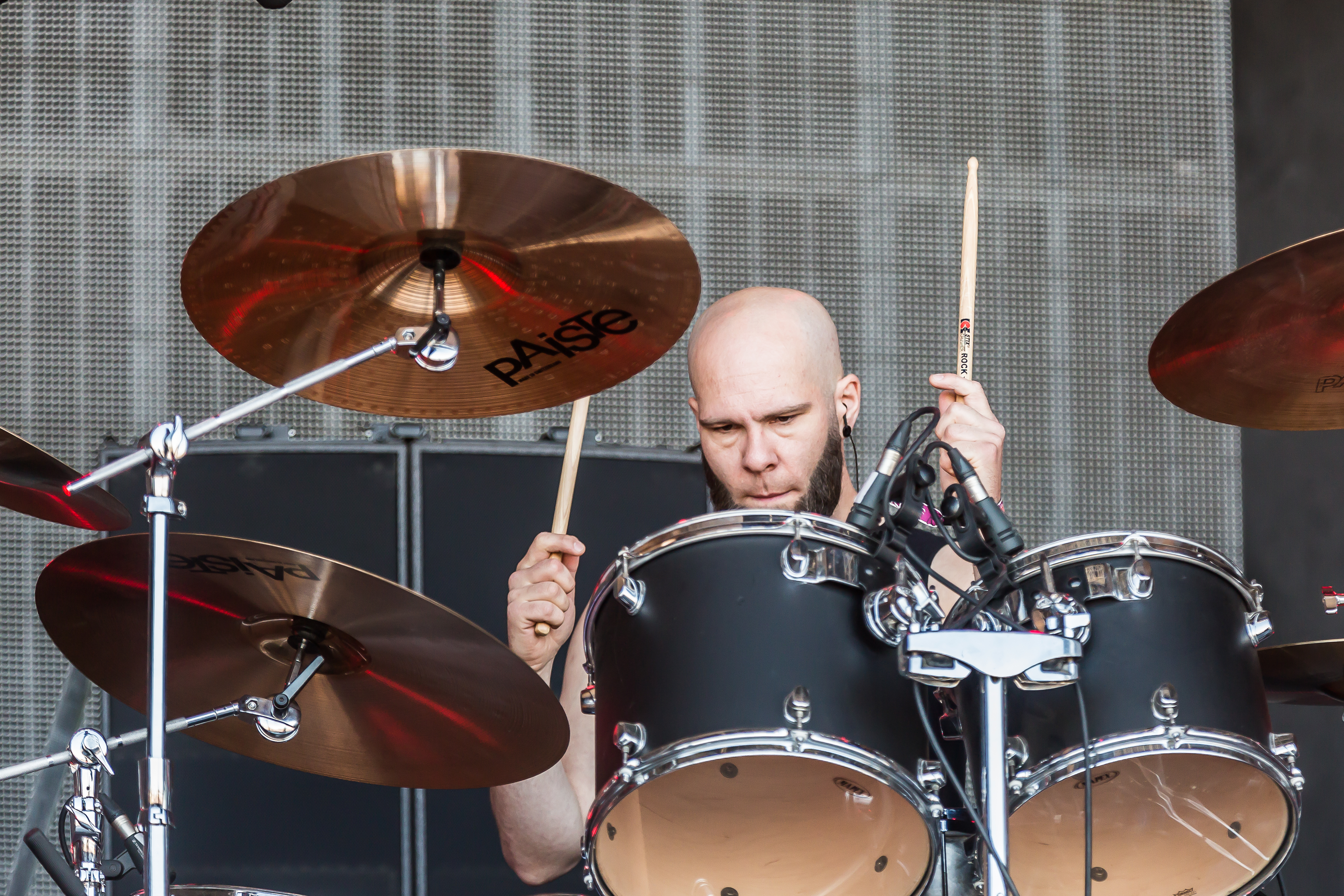
Drummer Cornelius Althammer

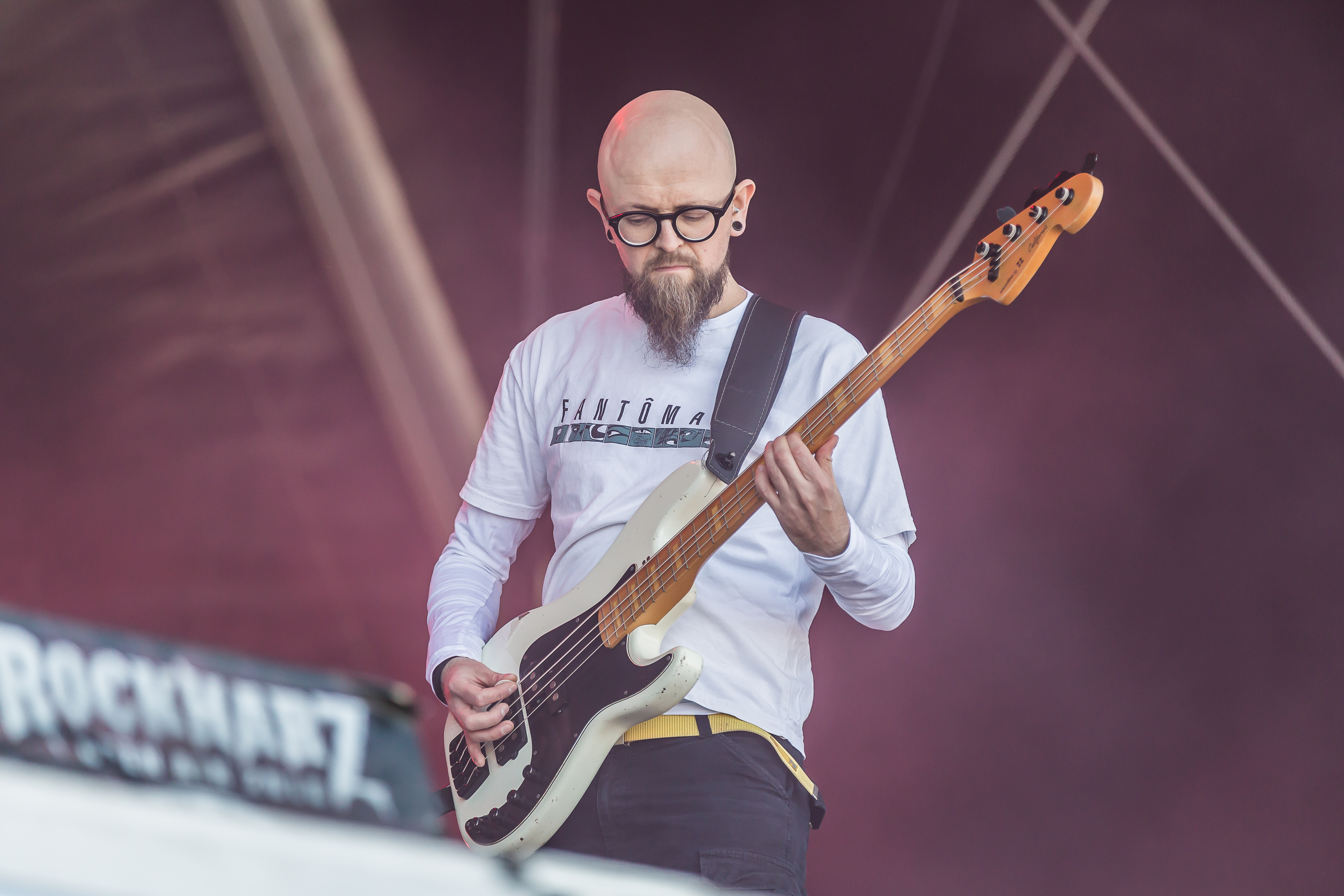
Bassist Stephan Wandernoth

=== Former members ===
- Stephan Adolph – bass, guitars, vocals (2004–2008)
