= Daniel Droste =

German musician

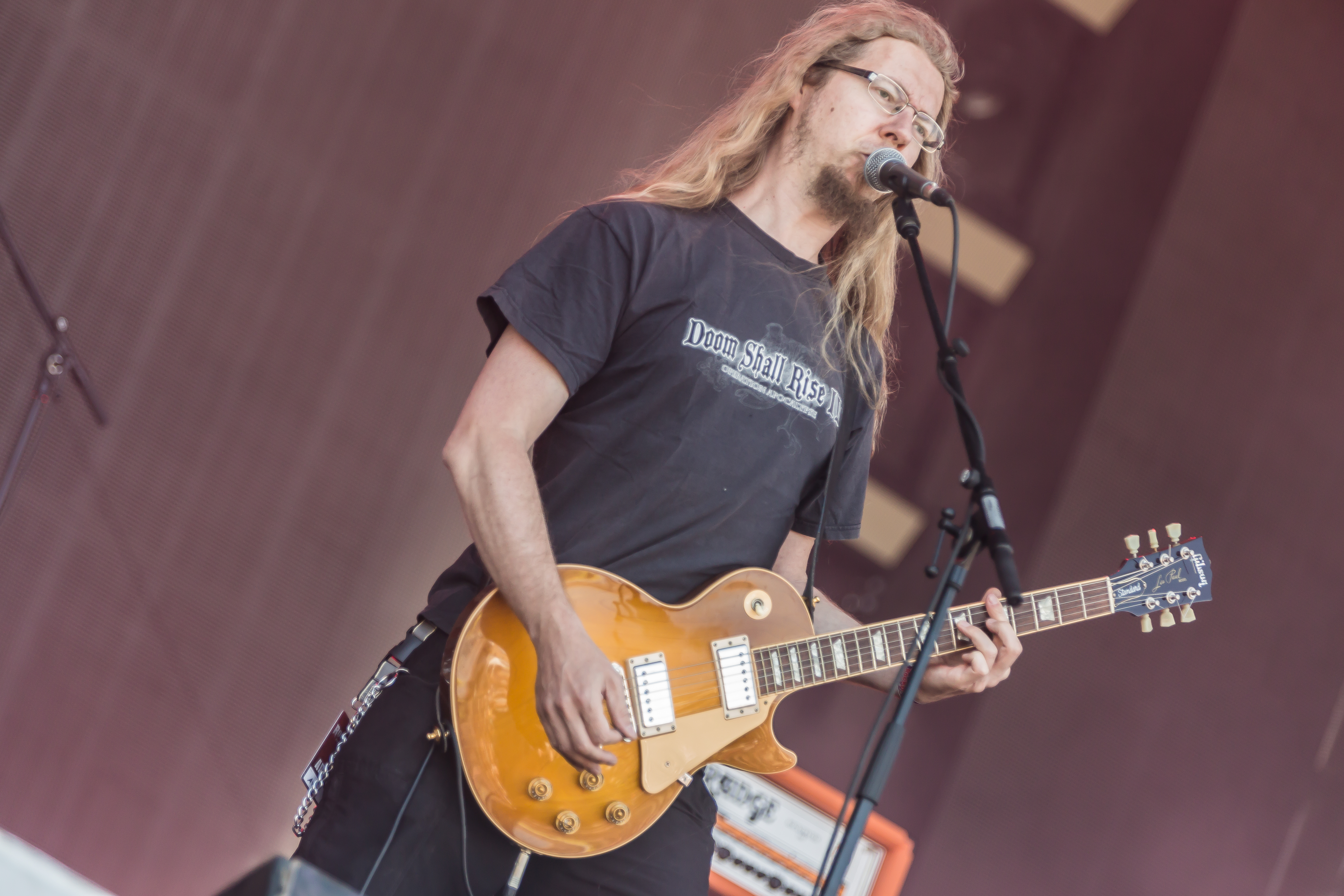
- Daniel Droste in Rockharz Open Air 2018

Background information
- Also known as: Dr. Oste
- Born: 2 April 1980 (age 44)
- Origin: Mosbach, Germany
- Genres: Gothic metal, folk metal, funeral doom metal, death metal
- Occupation(s): Musician, songwriter, therapist
- Instrument(s): Vocals, guitar, keyboard, programming
- Years active: 1994–present
- Labels: Napalm Records; Last Episode Records

Daniel Droste (born 2 April 1980 in Mosbach) is a German musician. He was a member of Midnattsol between 2003 and 2010, and founded Ahab in 2004.

== Career ==
Droste was the guitarist of the gothic/folk metal band Midnattsol and is the vocalist, guitarist, and keyboardist of the funeral doom band Ahab.

== Personal ==
Droste also works as a therapist.

== Discography ==
=== With Penetralia ===
- Schwarz (demo, 1996)
- Tribute to the Moon (demo, 1998)
- Carpe Noctem - Legends of Fullmoon Empires (full-length, 1999)
- Seelenkrank (full-length, 2000)

=== With Midnattsol ===
- Midnattsol (demo, 2003)
- Where Twilight Dwells (full-length, 2005)
- Nordlys (full-length, 2008)
- The Metamorphosis Melody (full-length, 2011)

=== With Ahab ===
- "The Stream" (single, 2004)
- The Oath (demo, 2005; EP, 2007)
- The Call of the Wretched Sea (full-length, 2006)
- The Divinity of Oceans (full-length, 2009)
- The Giant (full-length, 2012)
- The Boats of the Glen Carrig (full-length, 2015)
