= COK =

COK or Cok may refer to:

== Arts and entertainment ==
- Champions of Krynn, a role-playing video game
- "The Call of Ktulu", a song by thrash metal band Metallica
- Code Orange Kids, former name of an American rock band that formed in 2008
- A Clash of Kings, the second novel in George R. R. Martin's series A Song of Ice and Fire

== Other uses ==
- Cook Islands, a self-governing island country in the South Pacific Ocean
- Cok (surname), a surname
- Cok Simbara (born 1953), an Indonesian actor
- Cochin International Airport (IATA code), India
- Cok Istri Krisnanda Widani (born 1992), an Indonesian Ministry of Tourism and Creative Economy Ambassador, National Narcotics Board of the Republic of Indonesia Ambassador, Balinese dancer, model, beauty pageant titleholder who was crowned Puteri Indonesia Pariwisata 2013
- Animal Outlook (formerly Compassion Over Killing; COK), an animal advocacy group
- Center for offentlig kompetenceudvikling, the Danish municipalities' and regions' nationwide organization for training and development
- China-occupied Kashmir, an Indian term for the Chinese-controlled part of Kashmir
- City of Katy in Texas
- City of Kilgore in Texas

== See also ==
- COC (disambiguation)
- KOK (disambiguation)
- Cock (disambiguation)
