= Chronicles of Chaos (album) =

Compilation album by Sadus
- Released: 1997
- Genre: Thrash metal, speed metal, death metal
- Label: Mascot

Sadus chronology
A Vision of Misery (1992)	Chronicles of Chaos (1997)	Elements of Anger (1998)

Professional ratings
Review scores
Source	Rating
AllMusic	4.5/5 stars

Chronicles of Chaos is a compilation album of the American thrash metal band Sadus. It contains songs from their first three albums, which at the time of release were sold out. It was released in 1997 by Mascot Records.

== Track listing ==
1. "Certain Death" – 4:14
2. "Undead" – 4:03
3. "Sadus Attack" – 1:44
4. "Torture" – 2:24
5. "Hands of Fate" – 3:55
6. "Illusions" – 3:48
7. "Man Infestation" – 4:06
8. "Good Rid'nz" – 4:33
9. "Powers of Hate" – 3:40
10. "Arise" – 6:18
11. "Oracle of Obmission" – 3:50
12. "Through the Eyes of Greed" – 4:16
13. "Valley of Dry Bones" – 2:22
14. "Slave to Misery" – 4:01
15. "Facelift" – 7:00
16. "Deceptive Perceptions" – 3:35
17. "Echoes of Forever" – 6:00

Tracks 1–6 are from Illusions, track 7–11 are from Swallowed in Black, tracks 12–17 are from A Vision of Misery.

== Credits ==
- Steve Di Giorgio – bass, keyboards
- Jon Allen – drums
- Darren Travis – guitar, vocals
- Rob Moore – guitar
