= List of Rickenbacker players =

This is a list of musicians who are known to be regular players of Rickenbacker guitars and basses.

== Guitarists ==
- Viv Albertine of The Slits
- Chad Allen of The Guess Who
- Adam Anderson of Hurts
- Billie Joe Armstrong of Green Day
- Jim Babjak of The Smithereens
- Randy Bachman of The Guess Who
- Richard Barone of The Bongos
- Kurt Ballou of Converge
- Peter Banks of Yes
- Andy Bell of Ride, Oasis and Beady Eye
- Kat Bjelland of Babes In Toyland and Katastrophy Wife
- Mark Blackburn of Jacob's Trouble
- James Dean Bradfield of the Manic Street Preachers
- Carrie Brownstein of Sleater-Kinney
- David Bryson of Counting Crows
- Peter Buck of R.E.M.
- Jeff Buckley
- Mike Campbell of Tom Petty and the Heartbreakers
- Mary Chapin Carpenter
- Mike Connell of The Connells
- Mark Crozer of The Jesus and Mary Chain
- Jim Cuddy of Blue Rodeo
- Lenny Davidson of The Dave Clark Five
- Pat DiNizio of The Smithereens
- Pete Doherty of The Libertines
- Sherri DuPree of Eisley
- The Edge of U2
- Thomas Erak of the Fall of Troy
- Jay Ferguson of Sloan
- John Fogerty of Creedence Clearwater Revival
- Robert Forster of The Go-Betweens
- Les Fradkin of Beatlemania
- Glenn Frey of The Eagles
- Noel Gallagher of Oasis
- Craig Gannon of The Smiths
- Mark Gardener of Ride
- Per Gessle of Roxette
- Maurice Gibb of Bee Gees (1988–1994)
- Eric Goulden (Wreckless Eric)
- Laura Jane Grace of Against Me!
- Dave Gregory of XTC
- Sid Griffin of the Long Ryders and the Coal Porters
- Neil Halstead of Slowdive
- Caleb Harper of Spacey Jane
- George Harrison of The Beatles
- Lilly Hiatt
- Tony Hicks of The Hollies
- Susanna Hoffs of The Bangles
- Miles Holmwood of Stereos
- James Honeyman-Scott of the Pretenders
- Keith Hopwood of Herman's Hermits
- Steve Howe of Yes
- Kenny Howes
- James Iha of The Smashing Pumpkins
- Daniel Johns of Silverchair
- Brian Jones of the Rolling Stones
- Paul Kantner of Jefferson Airplane
- John Kay of Steppenwolf
- Daniel Kessler of Interpol
- Ezra Koenig of Vampire Weekend
- Jesse Lacey of Brand New
- Denny Laine of The Moody Blues
- Braeden Lemasters of Wallows
- John Lennon of The Beatles
- Yegor Letov of Grazhdanskaya Oborona
- Courtney Love of Hole
- Laura Marling
- Johnny Marr of The Smiths
- Gerry Marsden of Gerry & The Pacemakers
- Chris Martin of Coldplay
- Remi Matsuo of Glim Spanky
- Paul McCartney of The Beatles & Wings
- Roger McGuinn of The Byrds
- Grant McLennan of The Go-Betweens
- John McNally of The Searchers
- Wendy Melvoin of Prince and The Revolution
- Dave Meros of Spock's Beard
- Graham Nash of The Hollies
- Ed O'Brien of Radiohead
- Christopher Owens of Girls
- Kevin Parker of Tame Impala
- Mike Pender of The Searchers
- Tom Petty of Tom Petty and the Heartbreakers
- Guy Picciotto of Fugazi
- Sergio Pizzorno of Kasabian
- Cole Preston of Wallows
- Johnny Ramone of Ramones
- Jim Reeves
- Tim Rogers of You Am I
- Rover
- Tom Rowley of Milburn
- Michael Rutherford of Genesis and Mike + The Mechanics
- Charlie Sexton of Arc Angels
- Tommy Shaw of Styx
- Matt Skiba of Alkaline Trio
- Brix Smith Start of The Fall
- Elliott Smith
- Fred "Sonic" Smith of MC5 and Sonic's Rendezvous Band
- Rick Springfield
- Bernard Sumner of New Order and Joy Division
- Toots Thielemans
- Pete Townshend of The Who
- Chris Urbanowicz of Editors
- Robert van der Kroft
- Steven Van Zandt of The E Street Band
- Stevie Ray Vaughan
- Pål Waaktaar of a-Ha
- Dave Wakeling of The English Beat
- Jeff Walls of Guadalcanal Diary
- Joe Walsh of The Eagles
- Paul Weller of The Jam and The Style Council
- Paul Westerberg of The Replacements
- Marty Willson-Piper of The Church
- Carl Wilson of The Beach Boys
- Dwight Yoakam
- Thom Yorke of Radiohead
- Robin Zander of Cheap Trick

== Bassists ==
- Lemmy of Motörhead
- Gaye Advert of The Adverts
- Martin Eric Ain of Celtic Frost
- André 3000 of Outkast
- Chris Baio of Vampire Weekend
- Lou Barlow of Dinosaur Jr
- Guy Berryman of Coldplay
- Zeta Bosio of Soda Stereo
- Rob Bryan of Be-Bop Deluxe
- Cliff Burton of Metallica
- Geezer Butler of Black Sabbath
- Johnny Christ of Avenged Sevenfold
- Al Cisneros of Sleep and Om
- Les Claypool of Primus
- Paul D'Amour of Tool
- Alan Davey of Hawkwind
- John Deacon of Queen
- Joey DeMaio of Manowar
- Steve Di Giorgio of bands such as Sadus, Dark Hall & Testament
- Dave Dreiwitz of Ween
- John Entwistle of The Who
- Bruce Foxton of The Jam
- Nikolai Fraiture of the Strokes
- Maurice Gibb of The Bee Gees
- Martin "Youth" Glover of Killing Joke
- Roger Glover of Deep Purple
- Hellmut Hattler of Kraan
- Kim Gordon of Sonic Youth
- Martin Gordon of Sparks, Jet and Radio Stars.
- Graham Gouldman of 10cc
- Bob Hardy of Franz Ferdinand
- Haruko Haruhara of FLCL
- Glenn Hughes of Deep Purple
- Rick James
- Pete Trewavas of Marillion
- Tony James of Generation X
- Inge Johansson of Against Me! and The (International) Noise Conspiracy
- Eric Judy of Modest Mouse
- Jesse F. Keeler of Death From Above 1979
- Steve Kille of Dead Meadow
- Audun Laading of Her's
- Royston Langdon of Spacehog
- Jack Lawrence of The Raconteurs
- Geddy Lee of Rush
- Russell Leetch of Editors
- Brent Liles of Social Distortion and Agent Orange
- Tony Lombardo of Descendents
- Philip Lynott of Thin Lizzy
- Dan Maines of Clutch
- Paul McCartney of The Beatles
- Randy Meisner of The Eagles
- Dave Meros of Spock's Beard
- Mike Mesaros of The Smithereens
- Mike Mills of R.E.M.
- Gary "Mani" Mounfield of Primal Scream & The Stone Roses
- Mario Mutis of Los Jaivas
- Nick O'Malley of Arctic Monkeys
- Nick Oliveri of Queens of the Stone Age & Kyuss
- Jerry Only of The Misfits
- Prescott Niles of The Knack
- Chuck Panozzo of Styx
- David Paton of Pilot
- Ian Peres of Wolfmother
- Tom Petersson of Cheap Trick
- Tracy Pew of The Birthday Party
- Steve Priest of Sweet
- Peter Quaife of The Kinks
- Scott Reeder of Kyuss
- Kira Roessler of Black Flag and Dos
- Chris Ross of Wolfmother
- Michael Rutherford of Genesis
- Troy Sanders of Mastodon
- Timothy B Schmit of The Eagles
- Paul Simonon of The Clash
- Jim Smith of Cardiacs
- Chris Squire of Yes
- Tommy Stinson of The Replacements
- Mark Stoermer of The Killers
- Leon Sylvers III of The Sylvers and Dynasty
- Chris Taylor of Grizzly Bear
- John Taylor of Duran Duran
- Dougie Thomson of Supertramp
- Fred Turner of Bachman–Turner Overdrive
- Sid Vicious of Sex Pistols
- Roger Waters of Pink Floyd
- Kieren Webster of The View
- Haz Wheaton of Hawkwind and Electric Wizard
- Josephine Wiggs of The Breeders
- Paul Wilson of Snow Patrol
- Nicky Wire of Manic Street Preachers
- Chris Wolstenholme of Muse
- Allen Woody of Gov't Mule and The Allman Brothers Band
- Bill Wyman of The Rolling Stones
- Trevor Bolder of The Spiders from Mars, Uriah Heep, Wishbone Ash, Arnold Corns and Cybernaut
- Buddy Zabala of The Eraserheads and The Dawn
- Simon Gallup of The Cure
- Scott Pilgrim of Sex Bob-omb (fictional)
- Greg Lake of Emerson, Lake, and Palmer
- Jenny Lee Lindberg of Warpaint
- Greg Spawton of Big Big Train
- Stanley Clarke
- Glen Matlock of Sex Pistols
- Gail Greenwood of Belly
- Paul Gray of The Damned and Eddie and the Hot Rods
- Megan Zeankowski of The Lemon Twigs
- Craig Adams of The Sisters of Mercy and The Mission
