= Solens rötter =

Studio album by Vintersorg
- Released: 27 April 2007
- Recorded: 2005–2006
- Genres: Folk metal, black metal, progressive metal, extreme metal
- Length: 52:56
- Label: Napalm
- Producer: Vintersorg

Vintersorg chronology
The Focusing Blur (2004)	Solens rötter (2007)	Jordpuls (2011)

Solens rötter ("Roots of the Sun") is the sixth full-length album by Swedish folk metal band Vintersorg. The album re-introduced Andreas Hedlund's use of all Swedish lyrics, something Vintersorg has not had since their 1999 full-length, Ödemarkens son. Another shift for the band was the absence of Asgeir Mickelson, Steve DiGiorgio and Lars Nedland who had all participated on the previous two albums, The Focusing Blur and Visions from the Spiral Generator, handling, drums (Mickelson), bass (DiGiorgio), and guest vocals (Focusing Blur) & select Hammond sections (Visions and Focusing Blur) (Nedland). Instead, Johan Lindgren, Vintersorg's live bassist and Mattias Marklund's bandmate in TME, took over bass duties. Although Vintersorg's live drummer, Benny Hägglund, was originally planned to be drummer on the album, lack of schedule time resulted in the band just using the drums Hedlund programmed instead. With the prior two albums being strongly rooted in the progressive metal sound, Solens rötter is a merge between the early folk inspired albums and the later progressive ones.

== Track listing ==
- All songs written by Vintersorg.

No.	Title	Length
1.	"Döpt i en jökelsjö" ("Baptized in a Glacier Lake")	05:25
2.	"Perfektionisten" ("The Perfectionist")	04:17
3.	"Spirar och gror" ("Sprouts and Germinates")	06:33
4.	"Kosmosaik"	05:31
5.	"Idétemplet" ("The Temple of Ideas")	04:52
6.	"Naturens mystär" ("Nature's Mystery")	05:01
7.	"Att bygga en ruin" ("To Build a Ruin")	05:30
8.	"Strålar" ("Rays")	05:10
9.	"Från materia till ande" ("From Matter to Spirit")	05:48
10.	"Vad aftonvindens andning viskar" ("What the Evening Wind's Breath Whispers")	04:49
Total length:		52:56

== Personnel ==
=== Vintersorg ===
- Andreas Hedlund - all vocals, acoustic, rhythm and lead guitars, keyboards, Hammond organ, drum programming, loops and editing
- Mattias Marklund - lead and rhythm guitars

=== Additional musicians ===
- Johan Lindgren - bass
- Nils Johansson - additional keyboards and effects

== Production ==
- Arranged, produced and edited by Vintersorg
- Recorded and engineered by Vintersorg and Nils Johansson
- Mixed and mastered by Nils Johansson
