= COC =

COC may refer to:

== Terms ==
- Certificate of Conformity, see type approval
- Chain of command, following orders based on others' authority within the group.
- Chain of custody, the chronological record of a sample or evidence
- Circle of confusion, the optical term for a blurred spot which is the image of an out-of-focus point source
- Cleveland open-cup method, a method used in chemistry for determining a substance's flashpoint
- Code of conduct, a set of rules and regulations for organizations and events
- Cost of capital, an investment principal

== Organizations ==
- Canadian Olympic Committee, a private organization representing Canadian athletes in the International Olympic Committee and the Pan American Games
- Canadian Opera Company, Toronto-based opera company
- Chamber of commerce, a form of business network
- Children of the Confederacy, American lineage society
- Chinese Olympic Committee, represents People's Republic of China in handling international affairs related to the Olympic Movement
- Christian Outreach Centre, former name of International Network of Churches (INC), an Australian network of Pentecostal churches
  - Christian Outreach College (disambiguation), several schools linked to the INC
- Clinical Officers Council, a government agency that regulates the training, registration and licensing of Clinical officers in Kenya
- COC Nederland, the Dutch abbreviation for the earliest homophile organisation, founded in 1946
- Colombian Olympic Committee, the non-profit organization representing Colombia athletes in the International Olympic Committee
- The Company of Chivalry, an historical reenactment group
- Consortium of Consortia, the organization now known as the International Coalition of Library Consortia
- Corporation of Chennai, the civic agency in the city of Chennai, India
- Corporation of Coimbatore, India
- The Council of Canadians, a citizen's organization founded to oppose the Canada-U.S. Free Trade Agreement
- Croatian Olympic Committee, the non-profit organization representing Croatian athletes in the International Olympic Committee
- United States Chamber of Commerce, an American business federation

== Music ==
- Carnival of Chaos, an album by GWAR
- Carnival of Carnage, an album by horrorcore hip-hop duo, the Insane Clown Posse
- Chemistry of Consciousness, an album by thrash metal band Toxic Holocaust
- Children of the Corn (group), a hip-hop group composed of Cam'ron, Big L, Bloodshed and Herb McGruff
- City of Caterpillar, an Emo/Screamo band
- Corrosion of Conformity, a heavy metal band from the American South

== Other ==
- Calculus of constructions, a formal language in which both computer programs and mathematical proofs can be expressed
- The Call of Cthulhu, a short story by H.P. Lovecraft
- Cagayan de Oro College, a college in Cagayan de Oro, Philippines
- Call of Cthulhu, a tabletop role-playing game
- Captains of Crush Grippers, a brand of torsion-spring grippers
- Chip on chip, an extension of surface-mount technology
- Churches of Christ, a restorationist Christian denomination
- Clash of Civilizations, a theory of political science
- Clash of Clans, a freemium mobile MMO strategy video game by Supercell
- Georgia Institute of Technology College of Computing at the Georgia Institute of Technology, USA
- College of the Canyons, a two-year community college located in Santa Clarita, California
- Combined oral contraceptive pill, a medical method of birth control
- Commandant of cadets, the head faculty position responsible for cadet training within any U.S. Federal military academy:
  - List of Commandants of Cadets of the United States Air Force Academy
  - List of Commandants of Cadets of the United States Military Academy
- Community of Christ, previously known as the Reorganized Church of Jesus Christ of Latter-Day Saints
- Convention over configuration, a software design paradigm which seeks to decrease the number of decisions that developers need to make
- Corcoran station, an Amtrak station in California, United States whose station code is COC
- Cup of China, a figure skating competition
- Cyclic olefin copolymer, the chemical name for a plastic engineering resin
- Continuum of Care, a program designed to promote community-wide commitment to the goal of ending homelessness

== See also ==
- Tritenii de Jos (formerly called Coc), a commune in Cluj County, Romania
- Chain of command (disambiguation)
- Chronicles of Chaos (disambiguation)
