= Naturbål =

Studio album by Vintersorg
- Released: 27 June 2014
- Genres: Folk metal, black metal, progressive metal
- Length: 53:26
- Label: Napalm
- Producer: Vintersorg

Vintersorg chronology
Orkan (2012)	Naturbål (2014)	Till fjälls: Del II (2017)

Naturbål ("Nature's Bonfire") is the ninth full-length album by Swedish folk metal band Vintersorg. As with the previous three albums, the lyrics are all in Swedish. This is the third of a planned four-album concept series based on the elements, the previous two being Jordpuls and Orkan.

Ivan Tibos of Concreteweb rated it a 75 out of 100.

== Track listing ==
No.	Title	Length
1.	"Ur aska och sot" ("From Ashes and Soot")	07:07
2.	"Överallt och ingenstans" ("Everywhere and Nowhere")	05:06
3.	"En blixt från klar himmel" ("A Bolt from the Blue")	05:47
4.	"Lågornas rov" ("The Flames' Prey")	05:48
5.	"Rymdens brinnande öar" ("The Burning Islands of Space")	06:01
6.	"Natten visste vad skymningen såg" ("The Night Knew What the Twilight Saw")	05:23
7.	"Elddraken" ("The Fire Dragon")	05:57
8.	"Urdarmåne" ("Ancient Moon")	07:45
9.	"Själ i flamma" ("Soul in Flame")	04:32
Total length:		53:26

== Personnel ==
=== Vintersorg ===
- Andreas Hedlund - vocals, guitars (acoustic, lead, rhythm), bass, keyboards, programming
- Mattias Marklund - guitars (lead, rhythm)

=== Guest musicians and staff ===
- Simon Lundström - bass
- Helena Sofia Lidman - female vocals on "Ur aska och sot"
- Frida Eurenius - female vocals on "Rymdens brinnande öar"
- Kris Verwimp - cover art, artwork
- Örjan Fredriksson - photography
- Produced, engineered, mastered and mixed by Vintersorg
