= Orkan (album) =

Studio album by Vintersorg
- Released: 29 June 2012
- Genre: Folk metal, black metal, progressive metal
- Length: 50:28
- Label: Napalm
- Producer: Vintersorg

Vintersorg chronology
Jordpuls (2011)	Orkan (2012)	Naturbål (2014)

Orkan ("Hurricane") is the eighth full-length album by Swedish folk metal band Vintersorg. As with the previous two albums, the lyrics are all in Swedish. This is the second of a planned four-album concept series based on the elements, the first being Jordpuls.

== Track listing ==
No.	Title	Length
1.	"Istid" ("Ice Age")	05:51
2.	"Ur stjärnstoft är vi komna" ("Out of Stardust We're Born")	07:07
3.	"Polarnatten" ("The Polar Night")	07:24
4.	"Myren" ("The Mire")	05:03
5.	"Orkan" ("Hurricane")	05:14
6.	"Havets nåd" ("Mercy of the Ocean")	06:38
7.	"Norrskenssyner" ("Northern Light Visions")	06:08
8.	"Urvädersfången" ("Prisoner of the Primal Weather")	07:03
Total length:		50:28

== Personnel ==
=== Vintersorg ===
- Andreas Hedlund - vocals, guitars (acoustic, lead, rhythm), bass, keyboards, programming
- Mattias Marklund - guitars (lead, rhythm)

=== Guest musicians and staff ===
- Cia Hedmark - female vocals on "Norrskenssyner"
- Kris Verwimp - cover art, booklet
- Orjan Fredriksson - photography
- Produced, engineered, mastered and mixed by Vintersorg
