= Memoirs of a Broken Man =

Studio album by Futures End
- Released: 2009-11-13
- Recorded: 2009
- Genre: Progressive metal, power metal, heavy metal
- Length: 70:07
- Label: Nightmare Records
- Producer: Christian Wentz, Marc Pattison

Professional ratings
Review scores
Source	Rating
USA Prog Music	10/10
Danger Dog	4/5 stars

Memoirs of a Broken Man is the 2009 debut album by Futures End. It is the band's first release, and features guest appearances from Nightmare Records president Lance King. The album was voted 'Best Progressive Metal Album of 2009' in USA Progressive Music Magazine's annual poll, beating fellow contestants Redemption, Shadow Gallery, Edgend, and Dream Theater.

== Track listing ==
1. "Relentless Chaos" - 7:04
2. "Inner Self" - 7:01
3. "Endless Journey" - 4:29
4. "Your Decay" - 6:09
5. "Beyond Despair" - 5:29
6. "Share The Blame" - 5:55
7. "Forsaken" - 6:54
8. "Stand To Fall" - 6:44
9. "Terrors Of War" - 7:28
10. "Remembering Tomorrow" - 6:00
11. "Powerslave" (Iron Maiden cover) - 7:02

== Personnel ==
- Fred Marshall - lead vocals
- Marc Pattison – lead guitars, keyboard programming and sequencing
- Christian Wentz – lead guitars, piano, keyboards
- Steve Di Giorgio - bass
- Jon Allen – drums
- Lance King - guest vocals on "Inner Self"
- Lucho Silva - guest vocals on "Forsaken" and "Relentless Chaos"
