= Futures End =

American progressive metal band

- Origin: Contra Costa County, California, U.S.
- Genres: Progressive metal, power metal
- Years active: 2007–present
- Labels: Nightmare Records
- Members: Fred Marshall; Marc Pattison; Christian David Wentz; Steve Di Giorgio; Jon Allen
- Website: futuresendmusic.com

Futures End is an American progressive metal band based in California, formed by guitarists Christian Wentz and Marc Pattison.

Once their first few demos were completed, Fred Marshall, formerly of progressive metal band Zero Hour, was chosen to be their vocalist for his powerful vocals and great melodic sense. Shortly thereafter, bassist Steve Di Giorgio (Death, Sadus, Iced Earth) and drummer Jon Allen (Testament, Sadus) came on board to complete Futures End.

Their music has been compared to bands such as Symphony X, Testament, and Alice in Chains.

The band's debut album, Memoirs of a Broken Man, was released in October 2009 under Nightmare Records to considerable critical acclaim from the heavy metal community. That same year, the album was voted 'Best Progressive Metal Album of 2009' in USA Progressive Music Magazine's annual poll, beating fellow contestants Redemption, Shadow Gallery, Edgend, and progressive metal giants Dream Theater.

== Members ==
=== Current ===
- Fred Marshall – vocals
- Steve Di Giorgio – bass
- Marc Pattison – guitars
- Christian Wentz – guitars
- Jon Allen – drums

=== Former ===
- Larry Smith – bass

== Discography ==
- 2009: Memoirs of a Broken Man
