= The Shadow Inside =

Studio album by Sadus
- Released: November 17, 2023
- Recorded: 2017–2023
- Studio: Trident Studios
- Genre: Thrash metal, death metal
- Length: 47:05
- Label: Nuclear Blast
- Producer: Juan Urteaga

Sadus chronology
Out for Blood (2006)	The Shadow Inside (2023)

Singles from The Shadow Inside
- 1. "It's the Sickness" Released: November 18, 2022; 2. "Ride the Knife" Released: September 1, 2023; 3. "Scorched and Burnt" Released: October 13, 2023; 4. "Anarchy" Released: November 17, 2023

Professional ratings
Review scores
Source	Rating
Blabbermouth.net	9/10
Metal.de	6/10

The Shadow Inside is the sixth album by the American thrash metal band Sadus, and their first in 17 years, released on November 17, 2023, via Nuclear Blast. Production of the album can be traced back to August 20, 2017, when Darren Travis confirmed that Sadus would be releasing new material. In October of that year, Travis posted two videos from the studio teasing new music from the band. Former bassist Steve Di Giorgio was not part of the reunion. The album was recorded in Trident Studios. It is the last Sadus album to feature drummer Jon Allen, who was fired from the band in 2024.

== Track listing ==
1. "First Blood" – 6:51
2. "Scorched and Burnt" – 4:29
3. "It's the Sickness" – 4:29
4. "Ride the Knife" – 5:27
5. "Anarchy" – 2:47
6. "The Devil in Me" – 6:07
7. "Pain" – 4:15
8. "No Peace" – 5:08
9. "New Beginnings" – 2:10
10. "The Shadow Inside" – 5:22

== Personnel ==
Sadus

- Darren Travis – vocals, guitar, bass, keyboards
- Jon Allen – drums

Production

- Juan Urteaga – producer, engineer, manager
