= Cognitive (disambiguation) =

Cognition is the set of all mental abilities and processes related to knowledge, attention, memory and working memory, judgment and evaluation, reasoning and "computation", problem solving and decision making, comprehension and production of language, etc.

Cognitive may also refer to:

- Cognitive science, the interdisciplinary scientific study of the mind and its processes
- Cognitive psychology, the study of mental processes
- Cognitive bias, errors in perception
- Cognitive behavioral therapy, a form of psychotherapy
- Cognitive Science Society, society is a professional society for the interdisciplinary field of cognitive science
- Cognitive dissonance, the mental stress or discomfort experienced by an individual who holds two or more contradictory beliefs, ideas, or values at the same time
- Cognitive (album), the 2012 debut album of progressive metal supergroup Soen
