= Martin Lopez =

Swedish-Uruguayan drummer (born 1978)

Martín López
- Born: Martín Walter López Cardozo; 20 May 1978 (age 48); Stockholm, Sweden
- Genres: Progressive metal; melodic death metal
- Occupation: Musician
- Instruments: Drums, percussion
- Years active: 1995–present
- Member of: Soen
- Formerly of: Opeth; Amon Amarth

Martin Walter López Cardozo (born 20 May 1978 in Stockholm) is a Swedish-Uruguayan drummer, currently a member and co-founder of progressive metal group Soen, but best known as the ex-drummer of Swedish progressive metal band Opeth and melodic death metal band Amon Amarth.

López was born in Sweden to Uruguayan parents, later moving to Uruguay, then back to Sweden.

== Career ==
López joined Opeth in 1997, after leaving Swedish melodic death metal band Amon Amarth on whose album Once Sent From the Golden Hall he played. With Opeth, he recorded the albums My Arms, Your Hearse, Still Life, Blackwater Park, Deliverance, Damnation and Ghost Reveries.

For health reasons, López left Opeth permanently on 12 May 2006, to be replaced by Martin Axenrot. Lopez had not been actively involved with the band since the recording of Ghost Reveries wrapped in the summer of 2005. Lopez then shifted concentration to his old band, Fifth to Infinity. On 28 May 2010, it was announced that Martin Lopez, bassist Steve Di Giorgio, singer Joel Ekelöf and guitarist Kim Platbarzdis had joined forces in the band Soen. Their debut album, Cognitive, was released on 15 February 2012.

== Equipment ==
Martín endorsed Premier drums on the first albums with Opeth; he then switched over to Tama. His Premier kit was a Signia Marquis series; his Tama kit is a Starclassic series. He also endorses Sabian cymbals.

In 2014 Martín switched to a Noble & Cooley drum endorsement.

In 2021 he switched to Zildjian Cymbals, mainly focusing on the K Dark Series.

In 2021 he started using Axis Percussion pedals.

== Discography ==
=== with Amon Amarth ===
- Once Sent from the Golden Hall (1998)

=== with Opeth ===
- My Arms, Your Hearse (1998)
- Still Life (1999)
- Blackwater Park (2001)
- Deliverance (2002)
- Damnation (2003)
- Lamentations (2003)
- Ghost Reveries (2005)

=== with Soen ===
- Cognitive (2012)
- Tellurian (2014)
- Lykaia (2017)
- Lotus (2019)
- Imperial (2021)
- Memorial (2023)
- Reliance (2026)
