= Soen =

Swedish progressive metal band

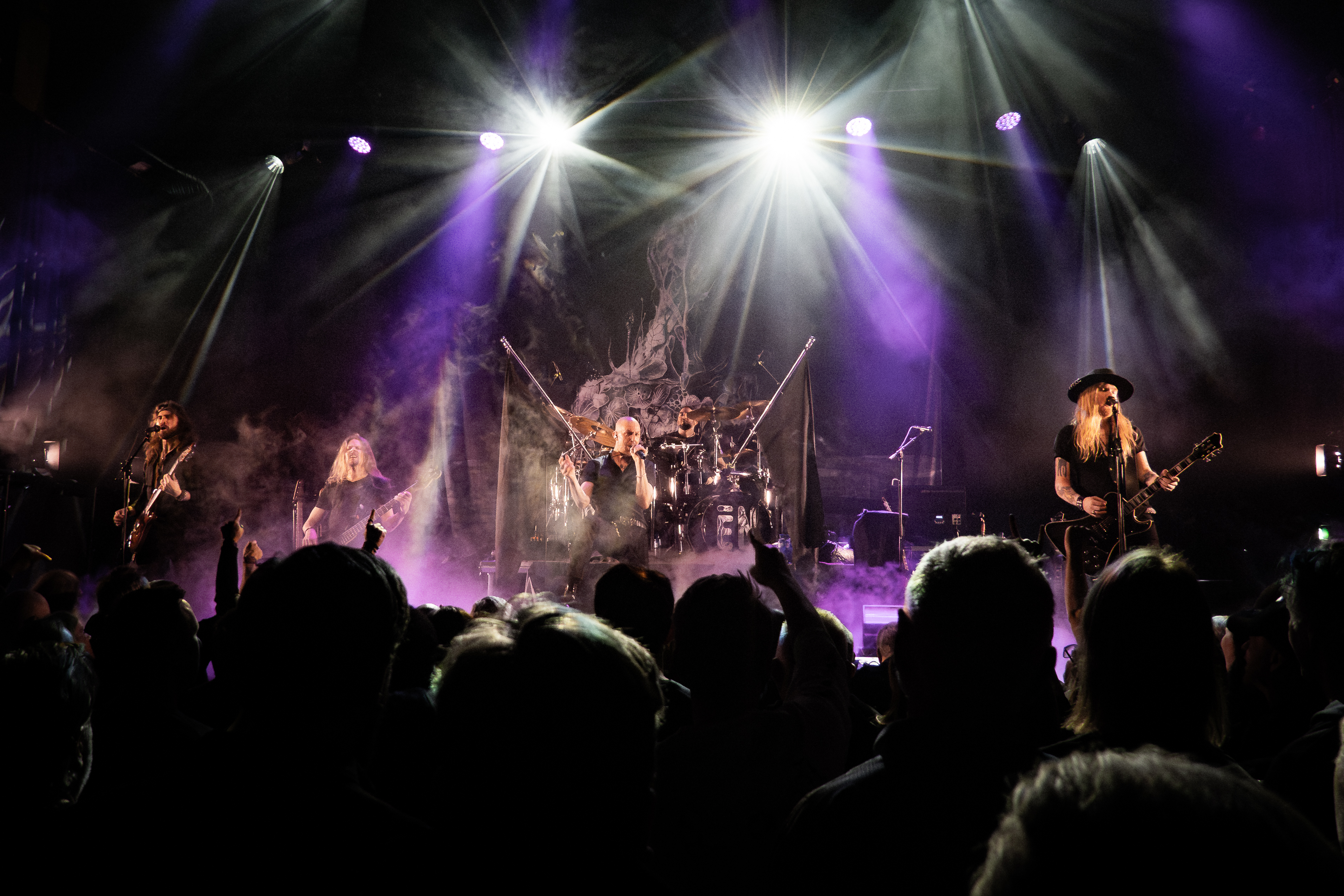
- Soen in 2026

Background information
- Origin: Sweden
- Genres: Progressive metal; progressive rock; alternative metal
- Years active: 2010–present
- Labels: Silver Lining; Warner; UDR Music; Universal; Spinefarm
- Members: Martin Lopez; Joel Ekelöf; Lars Åhlund; Cody Ford; Stefan Stenberg
- Past members: Steve Di Giorgio; Joakim Platbarzdis; Marcus Jidell; Oleksii 'Zlatoyar' Kobel
- Website: soenmusic.com

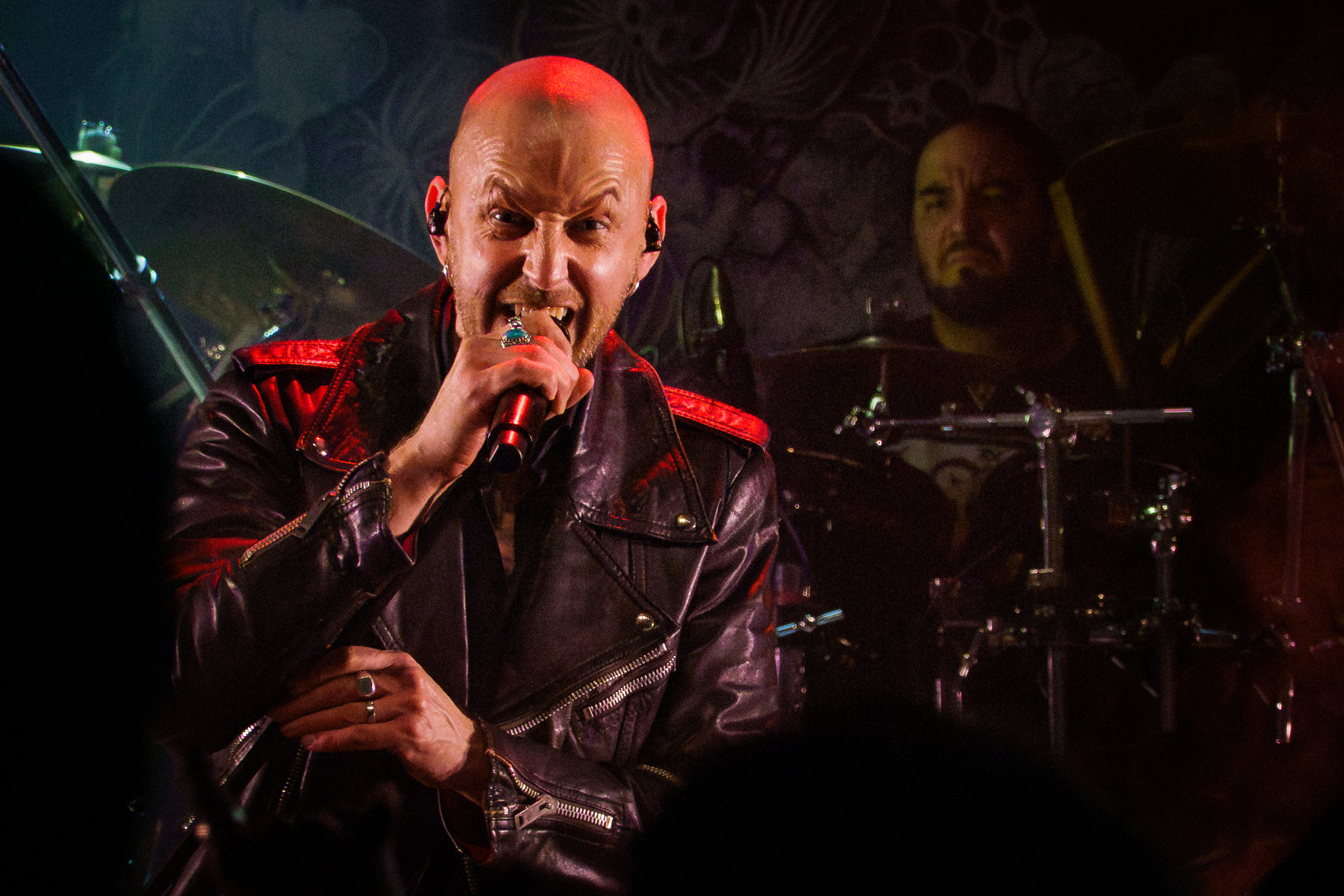
Ekelöf and Lopez at a concert in Oslo, 2026

Soen is a Swedish progressive metal band formed in 2010. The group consists of vocalist Joel Ekelöf, guitarist Cody Lee Ford, bassist Stefan Stenberg, drummer Martin Lopez and keyboardist Lars Åhlund. They are currently signed to Silver Lining and have released seven studio albums. Their most recent studio album, Reliance, was released on 16 January 2026.

== History ==
Initially formed in 2004, it was in May 2010 that the formation of Soen was announced. The original lineup consisted of former Opeth drummer Martin Lopez, ex-Death, Testament and Sadus bassist Steve Di Giorgio, Willowtree vocalist Joel Ekelöf and guitarist Joakim Platbarzdis. The group's first song, "Fraccions", was released on the band's official website in October 2010. Their first video, for the song "Savia", was posted on their Facebook page in February 2012. Their second video is a moody acoustic version of the song "Ideate". The band's third video is for the song "Delenda".

Drummer Martin Lopez has described Soen's music as "melodic, heavy, intricate and very different than everything else." Their debut, Cognitive, was released in February 2012 receiving positive critical reception. The members' technical proficiency was praised the most, though many reviewers noted extreme stylistic similarities to the music of Tool. Martin Lopez commented on the Tool similarity: "We are inspired by Tool but I consider them not only a band but a genre. Besides that, I really don't think there's anything to argue about, we make good music whoever it would remind you of. Some people tend to dislike rather than like and are looking for faults instead of seeing music for what it is, good or bad".

Cognitive was released on Spinefarm Records on 15 February 2012. The album was mixed by David Bottrill (Tool, Coheed and Cambria, Silverchair, Smashing Pumpkins, Muse, etc.) and mastered by João Carvalho. There is also a bonus track on the Japanese edition called "Writhen". Soen's second album, Tellurian was released on 4 November 2014. The album was produced by Platbarzdis, mixed again by David Bottrill and mastered at Bob Ludwig's Gateway setup in the U.S. by Adam Ayan. Lykaia is the third album released by Soen on 3 February 2017. The whole album was recorded using analog equipment. Their fourth album, Lotus, was released on 1 February 2019. Their fifth album, Imperial, was released on 29 January 2021. Their sixth album, Memorial, was released on 1 September 2023. Their seventh album, Reliance, was released on 16 January 2026.

== Band members ==
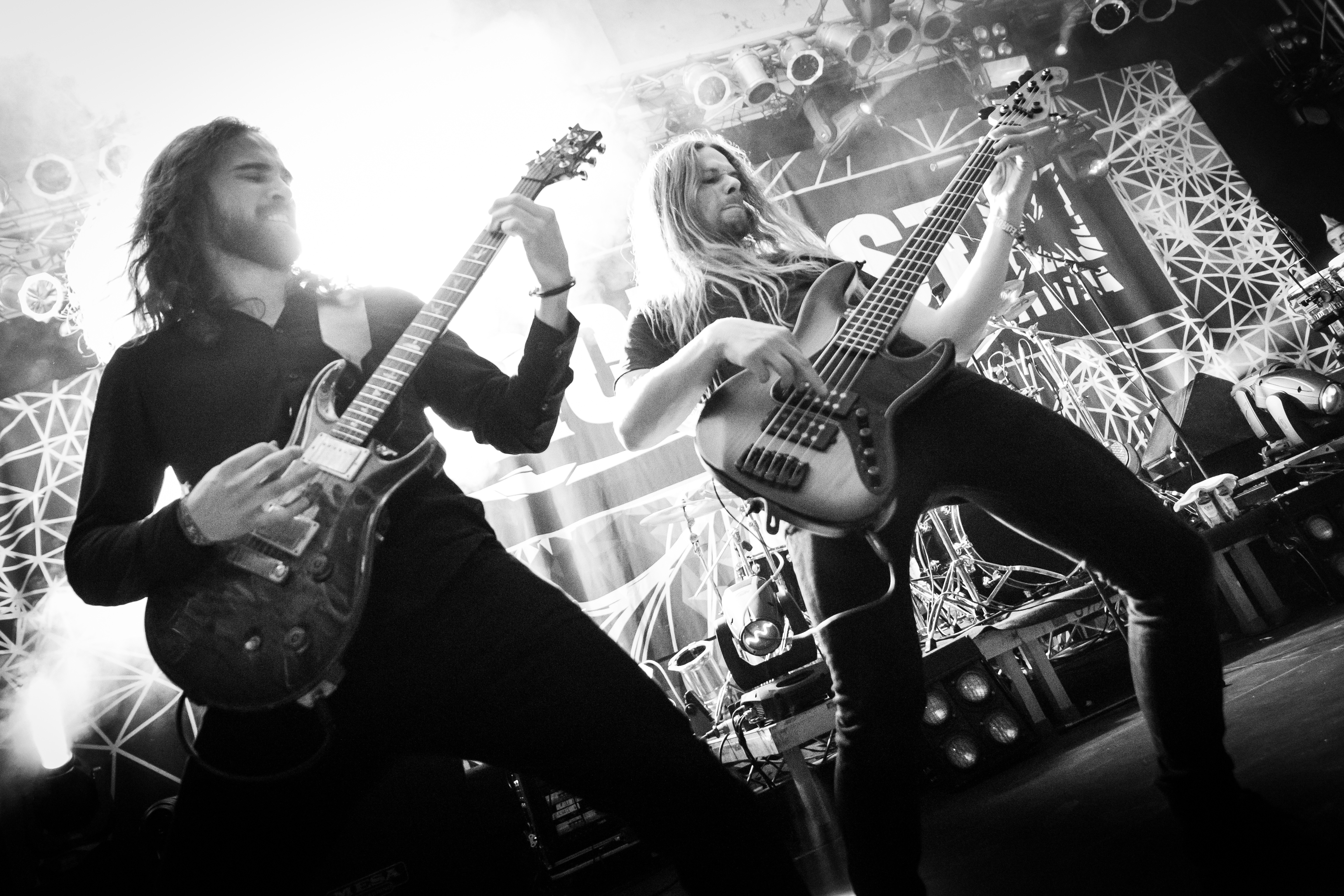
Cody Lee Ford and Stefan Stenberg at Euroblast Festival 2018

Current

- Martín López – drums, percussion (2010–present)
- Joel Ekelöf – lead vocals (2010–present)
- Lars Åhlund – keyboards, guitars, backing vocals (2014–present)
- Cody Lee Ford – guitars, backing vocals (2018–present)
- Stefan Stenberg – bass (2013–2020, 2025–present)

Former

- Steve Di Giorgio – bass (2010–2013)
- Joakim Platbarzdis – guitars (2010–2015)
- Marcus Jidell – guitars (2015–2018)
- Oleksii 'Zlatoyar' Kobel – bass (2020–2025)

Session

- Christian Andolf – bass
- Inti Oyarzún – bass

Timeline

== Discography ==
=== Studio albums ===
Year	Title	Peak chart positions						
Year	Title	AUT	BEL (WA)	FIN	GER	NLD	SWI	US Heat
2012	Cognitive	—	—	32	—	—	—	—
2014	Tellurian	—	—	—	—	—	—	—
2017	Lykaia	52	—	—	72	—	66	18
2019	Lotus	48	166	—	22	185	37	13
2021	Imperial	19	123	17	16	71	9	—
2023	Memorial	—	—	18	14	69	8	—
2026	Reliance	21	—	31	19	—	28	—
"—" denotes a recording that did not chart or was not released in that territory.

=== Live albums ===
Year	Title	Peak chart positions	
Year	Title	GER	SWI
2022	Atlantis	60	47

=== Singles ===
- "Savia" (2012)
- "Delenda" (2012)
- "Tabula Rasa" (2014)
- "The Words" (2014)
- "Sectarian" (2016)
- "Lucidity" (2017)
- "Opal" (2017)
- "Rival" (2018)
- "Martyrs" (2018)
- "Lotus" (2019)
- "Antagonist" (2020)
- "Monarch" (2020)
- "Illusion" (2021)
- "EMDR" (2021)
- "Thurifer" (2021)
- "Unbreakable" (2023)
- "Memorial" (2023)
- "Violence" (2023)
- "Primal" (2025)
- "Mercenary" (2025)
- "Discordia" (2025)
- "Indifferent" (2026)
- "Axis" (2026)
