= Till fjälls: Del II =

Till fjälls: del II

Studio album by Vintersorg
- Released: June 30, 2017
- Genres: Folk metal, black metal
- Length: 76:10
- Label: Napalm
- Producer: Vintersorg

Vintersorg chronology
Naturbål (2014)	Till fjälls: del II (2017)	Vattenkrafternas spel (2025)

Professional ratings
Review scores
Source	Rating
Dead Rhetoric	
MetalReviews.com	8.5/10

Till fjälls: del II ("To the mountains: part II") is the tenth full-length album by the Swedish folk metal band Vintersorg. It serves as a "return to roots" sequel to the album Till fjälls, meaning "no scientific lyrical concept, no progressive trickery, but a heartfelt return to snowcapped mountains, pure nature-inspired mysticism, Nordic folklore and black metal with a captivating epic streak", showcasing the band's original musical approach they began with.

== Track listing ==
Disc 1
No.	Title	Length
1.	"Jökelväktaren"	6:55
2.	"En väldig isvidds karga dräkt"	4:16
3.	"Lavin"	6:58
4.	"Fjällets mäktiga mur"	7:05
5.	"Obygdens pionjär"	5:25
6.	"Vinterstorm"	6:33
7.	"Tusenåriga stråk"	4:58
8.	"Allt mellan himmel och jord"	5:46
9.	"Vårflod"	3:25
Total length:		51:11

Disc 2
No.	Title	Length
1.	"Tillbaka till källorna"	6:46
2.	"Köldens borg"	7:06
3.	"Portalen"	5:52
4.	"Svart måne"	5:15
Total length:		24:59

== Personnel ==
=== Vintersorg ===
- Andreas Hedlund - vocals, guitars (acoustic, lead, rhythm), bass, keyboards, programming
- Mattias Marklund - guitars (lead, rhythm), vocals (backing)
- Simon Lundström - bass, vocals (backing)

=== Guest musicians and staff ===
- Marcelo Vaso - cover art
- Produced, engineered, mastered and mixed by Vintersorg
