= Broken man (disambiguation) =

In Ireland and Scotland a broken man were clansmen who no longer had any allegiance to their original clan. It may also refer to:

- The Broken Man (2016), the seventh episode of the sixth season the television series Game of Thrones
- The Hymn of a Broken Man (2011), the debut album by Times of Grace
- Memoirs of a Broken Man (2009), debut album by Futures End
- "Broken Man", song by Status Quo from On the Level (1975)
- "Broken Man", song by Boys Like Girls from their self-titled debut album (2006)
- "Broken Man", lead single by St. Vincent (AKA Annie Clark) from All Born Screaming (2024)

== See also ==
- The Broken Men (1902), by Rudyard Kipling
