= Tellurian (album) =

Studio album by Soen
- Released: 11 November 2014
- Genre: Progressive metal; progressive rock
- Length: 52:20
- Label: Spinefarm; Universal
- Producer: Joakim Platbarzdis

Soen chronology
Cognitive (2012)	Tellurian (2014)	Lykaia (2017)

Tellurian is the second studio album by Swedish progressive metal band Soen. The album released on 11 November 2014 through Spinefarm Records and was produced by Joakim Platbarzdis.

Professional ratings
Review scores
Source	Rating
Angry Metal Guy	4.5/5 stars
Metal Storm	9/10 stars
Metal Temple	5/5 stars
New Noise Magazine	4/5 stars
Sputnikmusic	4/5 stars

== Track listing ==
No.	Title	Length
1.	"Komenco"	0:37
2.	"Tabula Rasa"	5:24
3.	"Kuraman"	5:25
4.	"The Words"	6:18
5.	"Pluton"	7:27
6.	"Koniskas"	4:59
7.	"Ennui"	5:21
8.	"Void"	8:30
9.	"The Other's Fall"	8:42
Total length:		52:20

== Personnel ==
Soen

- Joel Ekelöf – vocals
- Joakim Platbarzdis – guitar, production
- Stefan Stenberg – bass
- Martin Lopez – drums, percussion, co-production

Additional musicians

- Christian Andolf – bass

Additional personnel

- David Bottrill – engineering, mixing
- Adam Ayan – mastering
- José Luis López Galván – artwork
