= Kok =

Kok or KOK may refer to:

- Kok (surname), a Dutch or Chinese surname

== Places ==
- Kok River, a river in Burma and Thailand
- Kokkola-Pietarsaari Airport's IATA code

== Abbreviations ==
- Kansallinen Kokoomus, the National Coalition Party, Finnish political party
- Kappa Omicron Kappa, the fraternity in the movie Sorority Boys
- Knock Out Kaine, a rock band from Lincoln, England
- Konkani language (ISO 639-2 and -3 code)
- Křesťanská Odborová Koalice, the Christian Labour Confederation in the Czech Republic
- King of Kings (kickboxing), a European kickboxing promotion

== Other ==
- Kok, also known as nuchal hump, a head protrusion found on the flowerhorn cichlid fish
- Kok (dessert), a Greek dessert

== See also ==
- de Kok, surname
