= Chronicles of Chaos =

Chronicles of Chaos is the title of:

- Chronicles of Chaos (webzine), launched 1995
- Chronicles of Chaos (fantasy trilogy), a novel series by John C. Wright
  - Orphans of Chaos (2005)
  - Fugitives of Chaos (2006)
  - Titans of Chaos (2007)
- Chronicles of Chaos (album) (1997), a compilation album of the American thrash metal band Sadus
