= Cognitive (album) =

Studio album by Soen
- Released: 15 February 2012
- Genre: Progressive metal; progressive rock
- Length: 48:31
- Label: Spinefarm
- Producer: Joakim Platbarzdis

Soen chronology
Cognitive (2012)	Tellurian (2014)

Cognitive is the debut studio album by Swedish progressive metal band Soen. The album was released on 15 February 2012 through Spinefarm Records and was produced by Joakim Platbarzdis.

Professional ratings
Review scores
Source	Rating
Metal Storm	8.5/10 stars
Metal Underground	3.5/5 stars
Sputnikmusic	3.5/5 stars

== Track listing ==
Cognitive track listing
No.	Title	Length
1.	"Fraktal"	1:18
2.	"Fraccions"	4:57
3.	"Delenda"	4:37
4.	"Last Light"	4:33
5.	"Oscillation"	6:50
6.	"Canvas"	6:37
7.	"Ideate"	4:07
8.	"Purpose"	4:11
9.	"Slithering"	5:35
10.	"Savia"	5:57
Total length:		48:31

Japanese edition bonus track
No.	Title	Length
11.	"Writhen"	5:59
Total length:		54:30

== Personnel ==
Soen

- Joel Ekelöf – vocals
- Joakim Platbarzdis – guitar, production
- Steve Di Giorgio – bass
- Martin Lopez – drums, percussion, co-production

Additional personnel

- David Bottrill – engineering, mixing
- João Carvalho – mastering
- Ben Tolman – artwork
