= Reliance (Soen album) =

Studio album by Soen
- Released: 16 January 2026
- Studios: Fascination Street; Krematoriet; Gröndahl
- Genres: Alternative metal; progressive metal; progressive rock
- Length: 43:30
- Label: Silver Lining
- Producer: Alexander Backlund

Soen chronology
Memorial (2023)	Reliance (2026)

Singles from Reliance
- 1. "Primal" Released: 20 September 2025; 2. "Mercernary" Released: 5 November 2025; 3. "Discordia" Released: 14 December 2025; 4. "Indifferent" Released: 13 January 2026

Reliance is the seventh studio album by the Swedish progressive metal band Soen. The album was released on 16 January 2026 through Silver Lining Music and was produced by Alexander Backlund. Singles/music videos were released for several tracks including "Primal" and "Mercenary".

The album received a mixed review by Prog's Paul Travers for the band's "more metal and less prog" direction.

The band promoted the album with touring including co-headlining the Scandinavian Heavy Arts Tour with Dark Tranquillity in North America in March and April 2026.

== Track listing ==
All tracks are written by Soen.

Reliance track listing
No.	Title	Length
1.	"Primal"	4:35
2.	"Mercenary"	4:11
3.	"Discordia"	3:55
4.	"Axis"	4:16
5.	"Huntress"	4:44
6.	"Unbound"	4:33
7.	"Indifferent"	3:38
8.	"Drifter"	4:21
9.	"Draconian"	4:37
10.	"Velichor"	4:46
Total length:		43:30

== Personnel ==
Credits are adapted from the album's liner notes.

=== Soen ===
- Joel Ekelöf – vocals
- Martin Lopez – drums
- Lars Enok Åhlund – keyboards, guitar
- Cody Lee Ford – guitar
- Stefan Stenberg – bass

=== Additional contributors ===
- Alexander Backlund – production, recording, mixing
- Tony Lindgren – mastering
- Jonas Sjölander – grand piano recording on "Indifferent"
- David Castillo – strings recording on "Indifferent"
- Tomas Ebrelius – first violin on "Indifferent"
- Andreas Forsman – second violin on "Indifferent"
- Victoria Nilsdotter – viola on "Indifferent"
- Cecilia Linné – cello on "Indifferent"
- Le Nevraglie Costanti – cover art
- Enrique Zabala – artwork, layout

== Charts ==
Chart performance for Memorial
Chart (2023)	Peak position
German Albums (Offizielle Top 100)	19
Swiss Albums (Schweizer Hitparade)	28
