= The Focusing Blur =

Studio album by Vintersorg
- Released: 16 February 2004
- Recorded: 2002–2003
- Genres: Progressive metal, avant-garde metal, black metal
- Length: 53:50
- Label: Napalm
- Producer: Vintersorg

Vintersorg chronology
Visions from the Spiral Generator (2002)	The Focusing Blur (2004)	Solens rötter (2007)

Professional ratings
Review scores
Source	Rating
Metal Express Radio	B
MetalReviews.com	86/100

The Focusing Blur is the fifth full-length album by the Swedish progressive / folk metal band Vintersorg; it was released on 16 February 2004. This album was the band's most progressive album to date, with many experimental and avant-garde elements; and the lyrics were now all written and sung in English.

== Track listing ==
- All songs written and arranged by Vintersorg.

No.	Title	Length
1.	"Prologue Dialogue - The Reason"	02:14
2.	"The Essence"	05:54
3.	"The Thesises Seasons"	04:47
4.	"Matrix Odyssey"	04:39
5.	"Star Puzzled"	05:48
6.	"A Sphere in a Sphere? (To Infinity)"	05:35
7.	"A Microscopical Macrocosm"	04:37
8.	"Blindsight Complexity"	04:52
9.	"Dark Matter Mystery (Blackbody Spectrum)"	05:03
10.	"Curtains"	04:45
11.	"Artifacts of Chaos"	02:37
12.	"Epilogue Metalogue - Sharpen Your Mind Tools"	02:59
Total length:		53:50

== Personnel ==
=== Vintersorg ===
- Mr. V - all vocals, acoustic, rhythm and lead guitars, keyboards, Hammond, loops & editing
- Mattias Marklund - lead and rhythm guitars

=== Guest musicians ===
- Lars "Lazare" Nedland - storytelling, Hammond on "Star Puzzled"
- Steve DiGiorgio - bass
- Asgeir Mickelson - drums

== Production ==
- Produced by Vintersorg
- Recorded, engineered and mixed by Vintersorg, Borge Finstad and Nils Johansson
