= Lotus (Soen album) =

Studio album by Soen
- Released: 1 February 2019
- Genre: Progressive metal; alternative metal
- Length: 54:25
- Label: Silver Lining; Warner
- Producer: David Castillo; Iñaki Marconi

Soen chronology
Lykaia (2017)	Lotus (2019)	Imperial (2021)

Singles from Lotus
- 1. "Martyrs" Released: 7 December 2018; 2. "Lotus" Released: 18 January 2019

Professional ratings
Review scores
Source	Rating
Metal Injection	8.5/10

Lotus is the fourth studio album by Swedish progressive metal band Soen. The album was released on 1 February 2019 through Silver Lining Music. It was produced by David Castillo and Iñaki Marconi, and preceded by the singles "Martyrs" on 7 December 2018 and the title track on 18 January 2019.

It is the first album with Canadian musician Cody Ford on guitar.

== Track listing ==
All tracks are written by Soen.

Lotus track listing
No.	Title	Length
1.	"Opponent"	5:44
2.	"Lascivious"	5:37
3.	"Martyrs"	6:08
4.	"Lotus"	5:24
5.	"Covenant"	5:42
6.	"Penance"	6:17
7.	"River"	5:21
8.	"Rival"	5:51
9.	"Lunacy"	8:05
Total length:		54:25

Bonus Edition
No.	Title	Length
10.	"EMDR"	7:30
11.	"Thurifer"	6:06
12.	"Virtue"	5:57
Total length:		73:58

== Personnel ==
Soen

- Joel Ekelöf – lead vocals
- Cody Ford – guitar, backing vocals
- Stefan Stenberg – bass
- Lars Åhlund – keyboards, guitar, backing vocals
- Martin Lopez – drums, percussion

Additional musicians

- Emeli Jeremias – cello

Additional personnel

- David Castillo – production, mixing
- Iñaki Marconi – production, band photo
- Jens Bogren – mastering
- Wriliya – cover artwork
- Enrique Zabala – album design
- Stephanie Pearl – booklet images

== Charts ==
Chart performance for Lotus
Chart (2019)	Peak position
Austrian Albums (Ö3 Austria)	48
Belgian Albums (Ultratop Wallonia)	166
Dutch Albums (Album Top 100)	185
German Albums (Offizielle Top 100)	22
Swiss Albums (Schweizer Hitparade)	37
US Heatseekers Albums (Billboard)	13
