= Cok (surname) =

Cok is a surname. Notable people with the surname include:

- John Cok (fl. 1420), English politician
- Ronald S. Cok (born 1959), American scientist, engineer, and inventor

== See also ==
- Lucija Čok
