= Lykaia (album) =

Studio album by Soen
- Released: 3 February 2017
- Studio: Ghost Ward; Studio Gröndahl; Deep Well Studio; Rubadub Studio
- Genre: Progressive metal; alternative metal
- Length: 49:36
- Label: UDR Music
- Producer: Marcus Jidell

Soen chronology
Tellurian (2014)	Lykaia (2017)	Lotus (2019)

Singles from Lykaia
- 1. "Sectarian" Released: 15 December 2016; 2. "Lucidity" Released: 24 January 2017; 3. "Opal" Released: 25 February 2017

Lykaia Revisited
- Lykaia Revisited cover

Professional ratings
Review scores
Source	Rating
Classic Rock	3/5 stars
Metal Hammer	3/5 stars
Metal Injection	5/10

Lykaia is the third studio album by Swedish progressive metal band Soen. The album was released on 3 February 2017 through UDR Music and was produced by Marcus Jidell of Avatarium. It is the band's only album to feature Jidell as their guitarist. It was also the first album with keyboardist Lars Åhlund.

The album was preceded by the singles "Sectarian" on 15 December 2016, "Lucidity" on 24 January, and "Opal" on 25 February 2017.

== Track listing ==
All tracks are written by Soen.

Lykaia track listing
No.	Title	Length
1.	"Sectarian"	5:53
2.	"Orison"	7:06
3.	"Lucidity"	6:35
4.	"Opal"	6:44
5.	"Jinn"	5:49
6.	"Sister"	5:29
7.	"Stray"	5:37
8.	"Paragon"	6:23
Total length:		49:36

2017 CD release bonus track
No.	Title	Length
9.	"God's Acre"	8:10
Total length:		57:46

Lykaia Revisited (2018 remaster bonus tracks)
No.	Title	Length
9.	"Vitriol"	7:39
10.	"God's Acre"	8:10
11.	"Sectarian" (live in Lisbon)	6:26
12.	"Jinn" (live in Lisbon)	6:54
13.	"Lucidity" (live in Rome)	7:33
Total length:		86:57

== Personnel ==
Soen

- Joel Ekelöf – lead vocals
- Marcus Jidell – guitars, production
- Stefan Stenberg – bass
- Lars Åhlund – keyboards, guitars, backing vocals, organ, rhodes
- Martin Lopez – drums, percussion

Additional musicians

- Andreas Tengberg – violin, cello

Additional personnel

- David Castillo – recording
- Stefan Boman – mixing
- Ulf Schmidt – guitar technician
- Rickard Gustafsson – drums technician
- Alvaro Cubero – artwork
- Martin Hummel-Gradén – album design
- Carl Göthammar – Soen snake logo

== Charts ==
Chart performance for Lykaia
Chart (2017)	Peak position
Austrian Albums (Ö3 Austria)	52
German Albums (Offizielle Top 100)	72
Swiss Albums (Schweizer Hitparade)	66
US Heatseekers Albums (Billboard)	18
