= Cosmic Genesis =

Studio album by Vintersorg
- Released: November 3, 2000
- Genres: Progressive metal, black metal, folk metal
- Length: 50:13
- Label: Napalm
- Producers: Andreas Hedlund, Mattias Marklund

Vintersorg chronology
Ödemarkens son (1999)	Cosmic Genesis (2000)	Visions from the Spiral Generator (2002)

Professional ratings
Review scores
Source	Rating
MetalReviews.com	90/100
RevelationZ Magazine	9/10
Rough Edge	3.5/4

Cosmic Genesis is the third full-length album by the Swedish progressive/folk metal band Vintersorg. It was released on November 3, 2000. The album signaled a move away from the folk metal of the previous two albums to progressive, as well as lyrical themes, now mostly written in English, moving towards cosmos as opposed to nature and paganism.

== Track listing ==
No.	Title	Length
1.	"Astral and Arcane"	06:56
2.	"Algol"	06:08
3.	"A Dialogue with the Stars"	05:47
4.	"Cosmic Genesis"	07:06
5.	"Om regnbågen materialiserades" ("If the Rainbow Materialized")	05:01
6.	"Ars Memorativa" ("Art of Memory")	05:09
7.	"Rainbow Demon" (Uriah Heep cover)	04:01
8.	"Naturens galleri" ("Nature's Gallery")	05:22
9.	"The Enigmatic Spirit"	04:43
Total length:		50:13

- "A Dialogue with the Stars" is misspelled "A Dialouge with the Stars" on some versions. This error is also present in the liner notes.

== Personnel ==
- Vintersorg - vocals, guitars, acoustic guitar, bass, keyboards, drum programming, producer, layout
- Mattias Marklund - guitars producer

=== Additional personnel and staff ===
- Nils Johansson - additional programming, keyboards, co-producer, engineering
- Jens Rydén - layout
- Newens - band photography
