= Illusions (Sadus album) =

Studio album by Sadus
- Released: July 1988
- Recorded: April 1988
- Studio: Starlight Sound Studios
- Genre: Thrash metal
- Length: 29:07
- Label: Independent/Roadrunner

Sadus chronology
D.T.P. (1986)	Illusions (1988)	Swallowed in Black (1990)

Chemical Exposure cover
- Cover of "Chemical Exposure", released in 1991.

Professional ratings
Review scores
Source	Rating
AllMusic	4/5 stars

Illusions is the debut studio album of Sadus originally released in 1988. It was re-issued on CD by Roadrunner Records as Chemical Exposure in 1991, and again in 2006 with two bonus tracks.

It was reissued by Displeased Records in 2007 with eight bonus tracks and a video clip.

== Music ==
In his review of the album, Eduardo Rivadavia of AllMusic assessed that stylistically, Illusions "stood balanced on a knife's edge between the already fading (though few were aware of it) thrash scene and the death metal movement about to replace it. [...] Tracks like "Certain Death," "Torture," "Fight or Die," and even the rather funny "Sadus Attack" played by the former style's unfailingly frantic, break-neck speed rules, rarely ever slowing down to preempt the latter's greater dynamic diversity. But the young Sadus players' already awesome technical abilities clearly belonged with the next generation of post-thrash deathsters." Hence, the material on Illusions is considered by critics to be technically superior to many other Bay area thrash bands of the time.

== Reception ==
Eduardo Rivadavia of AllMusic gave the album four stars out of five, commending the musicianship and expressing his belief that the band surpassed many Bay area trash metal bands technically.

=== Charts ===
Year	Chart	Position
2007	Poland (ZPAV Top 100)	90

== Track listing ==
All tracks are written by Sadus.

No.	Title	Length
1.	"Certain Death"	4:12
2.	"Undead"	4:00
3.	"Sadus Attack"	1:44
4.	"Torture"	2:22
5.	"And Then You Die"	1:44
6.	"Hands of Fate"	3:54
7.	"Twisted Face"	1:57
8.	"Fight or Die"	2:53
9.	"Illusions"	3:47
10.	"Chemical Exposure"	2:16
Total length:		29:07

=== 2006 re-issue bonus tracks ===
11. "Desolator" (Demo) - 3:50
12. Torture (Demo) - 2:43

=== 2007 re-issue bonus tracks ===
1. "Sadus Attack (demo)"
2. "Torture (demo)"
3. "Kill Team (demo)"
4. "Desolator (demo)"
5. "Fight or Die (demo)"
6. "Twisted Face (demo)"
7. "Number One (demo)"
8. "Hands of Fate (demo)"
9. "Certain Death (video clip)"

== Personnel ==
- Darren Travis – guitar, vocals
- Rob Moore – guitar
- Steve Di Giorgio – bass
- Jon Allen – drums
