= Imperial (Soen album) =

Studio album by Soen
- Released: 29 January 2021
- Genre: Progressive metal; progressive rock
- Length: 42:04
- Label: Silver Lining
- Producer: David Castillo; Iñaki Marconi

Soen chronology
Lotus (2019)	Imperial (2021)	Memorial (2023)

Imperial is the fifth studio album by Swedish progressive metal band Soen. The album was released on 29 January 2021 through Silver Lining Music. It was produced by David Castillo and Iñaki Marconi. It is the band's first album with bassist Oleksii 'Zlatoyar' Kobel.

== Critical reception ==
Professional ratings
Review scores
Source	Rating
Metal Injection	8.5/10
Metal Storm	8/10
Outburn	9/10
Ultimate Guitar	8/10

The album received generally positive reviews from critics. Metal Injection rated the album 8.5 out of 10 and stated, "Imperial is a major achievement by the Swedish group and easily their best record yet." Kelley Simms of Outburn rated the album 9 out of 10 and said: "Imperial isn't as proggy as Soen's previous releases, but the music is more straightforward and accessible. The record will have no problem fitting in with their previous records, yet this is the tightest and most cohesive Soen has sounded to date. Imperial is pure magic!" Ultimate Guitar gave the album a positive review and stated: "Soen's Imperial is simply a no-brainer of a recommendation - you're going to love this record. They know the audience they're targeting, and it works beautifully in that context. However, it would be nice to see their evolution take them even further into a sound that's more distinctly their own in the future."

== Track listing ==
All tracks are written by Soen.

Imperial track listing
No.	Title	Length
1.	"Lumerian"	5:31
2.	"Deceiver"	4:33
3.	"Monarch"	4:52
4.	"Illusion"	5:10
5.	"Antagonist"	6:02
6.	"Modesty"	4:34
7.	"Dissident"	5:37
8.	"Fortune"	5:42
Total length:		42:04

== Personnel ==
Soen

- Joel Ekelöf – lead vocals
- Cody Ford – guitar, backing vocals
- Oleksii 'Zlatoyar' Kobel – bass
- Lars Åhlund – keyboards, guitar, backing vocals
- Martin Lopez – drums, percussion

Additional musicians

- Emeli Jeremias – cello
- Katarina Dennis – viola
- Karin Hellqvist and Lina Söderholtz – violin

Additional personnel

- David Castillo – production
- Iñaki Marconi – production
- Kane Churko – mixing, mastering
- Ricardo Borges – vocal editing
- Wriliya – artwork, design
- Mark Laita – cover, photography
- Ola Lewitschnik – photography, image editing
- Enrique Zabala – design

== Charts ==
Chart performance for Imperial
Chart (2021)	Peak position
Austrian Albums (Ö3 Austria)	19
Belgian Albums (Ultratop Wallonia)	123
Dutch Albums (Album Top 100)	71
German Albums (Offizielle Top 100)	16
Swiss Albums (Schweizer Hitparade)	9
