= Vintersorg =

Swedish metal band

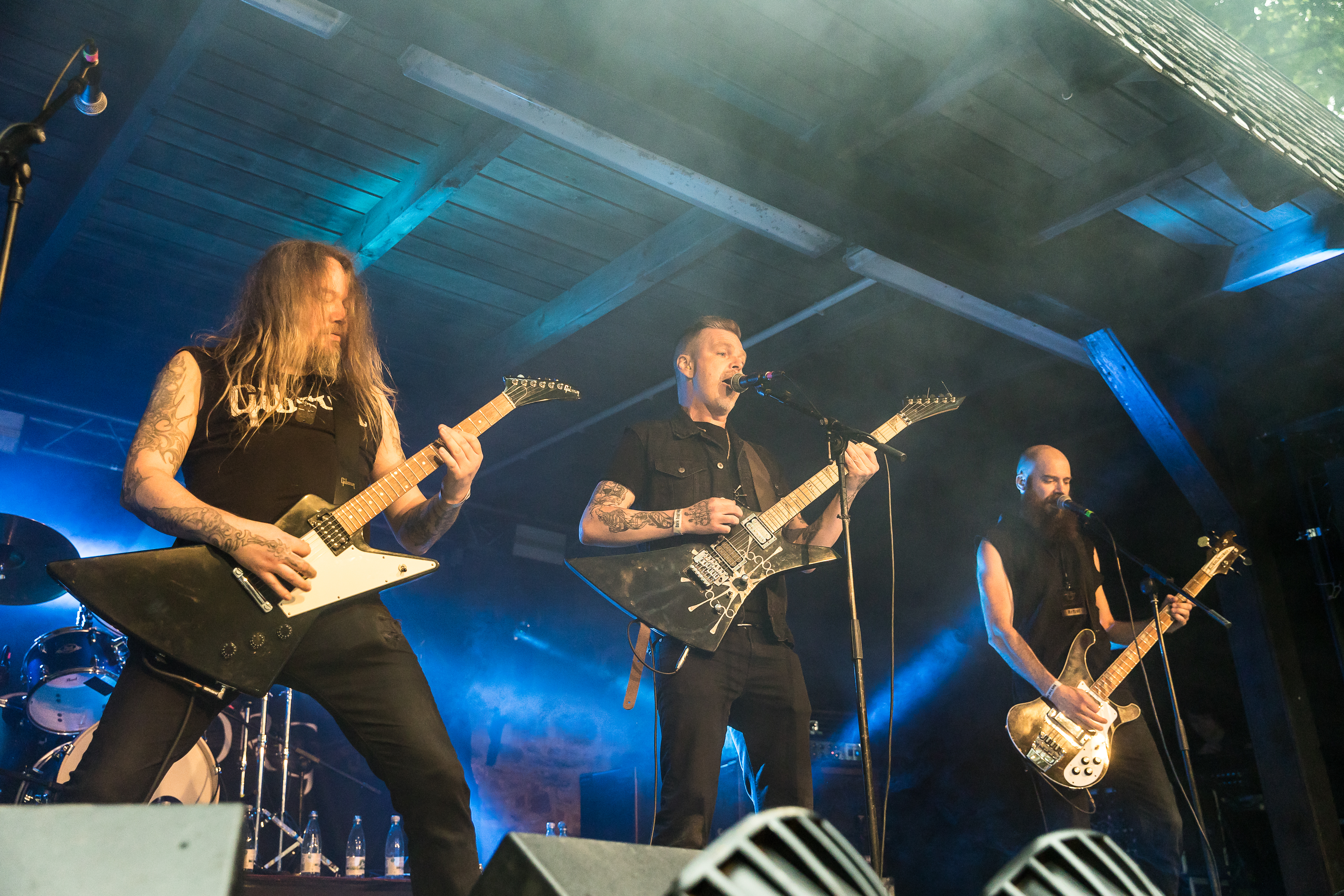
- Vintersorg at the Dark Troll festival 2025 in Germany

Background information
- Origin: Skellefteå, Sweden
- Genres: Folk metal, progressive metal, viking metal, black metal
- Years active: 1994–present
- Labels: Napalm, SPV
- Members: Andreas Hedlund; Mattias Marklund; Simon Lundström

Vintersorg (Swedish pronunciation: [ˈvɪ̂nːtɛˌʂɔrj]; "Winter Sorrow" in English) is a Swedish metal band from Skellefteå, formed in 1994 under the name Vargatron (Wolfthrone in English). Musically, Vintersorg has covered a wide number of genres; while the band is mostly rooted in extreme metal styles, particularly black metal and Viking/folk metal, it has also expanded into progressive metal and avant-garde metal. Lyrically, the band deals with topics on fantasy, mythology, nature, the cosmos, and metaphysics. Vintersorg means "Winter Sorrow", but the name was taken from The Legend of the Ice People series by Margit Sandemo, where the character Vintersorg is the son of a great pagan leader.

== History ==
The project was originally formed in 1994 to "push the limits" of black metal music, where the vocals are mostly clean sung, and only a few parts per song that had the traditional screaming vocals. The sound of Vintersorg has vastly changed over the years, as their earlier sound had more of a folk influence, and later on, more of an experimental sound. This transformation was most notably marked with the release of the Cosmic Genesis album, and the change in sound progressed from album to album, with the 2004 album The Focusing Blur being an extremely avant-garde album. The band's vocal elements have changed from album to album as well, starting out with low-pitched, powerful baritone singing, and gradually shifting towards softer, higher-pitched delivery with more use of harmony and layering with black metal vocals. Solens rötter, marked a return to the earlier folk metal style, while retaining the more complex and non-traditional guitar arrangements and song structures of later albums. On Jordpuls and Orkan there was a continuation with the Swedish sung material and nature oriented themes. Till fjälls: Part II, a double album was released in June 2017.

Along with this change in musical style, the lyrical topics began to shift as well. On earlier albums, the lyrics are all written and performed in Swedish, and dealt with topics of nature and paganism. With the advent of Cosmic Genesis, the lyrics were now written and sung mostly in English, and now dealt with scientific ideas such as astronomy and cosmology, philosophies such as metaphysics, and other ideas such as astrology. In the Cosmic Genesis booklet, Vintersorg extends thanks to Dr. Carl Sagan, author of the book Cosmos. Since, then, the band has alternated between both English and Swedish lyrics, sometimes using both on the same album. In keeping with the band's return to its folk roots, the latter albums are also sung entirely in Swedish and deal with more traditional themes.

Andreas Hedlund (a.k.a. Vintersorg) is constantly creating music. He is the front-man of several bands including Otyg,Havayoth, Fission, Cronian and Waterclime.

== Band members ==
- Andreas "Vintersorg" Hedlund – composer, vocals, guitars, keyboard, programing
- Mattias Marklund – guitars
- Simon Lundström - bass guitar, backing vocals

=== Session musicians ===
- Vargher – keyboards on Hedniskhjärtad, Till fjälls, and Ödemarkens son
- Cia Hedmark – female vocals on Hedniskhjärtad, Till fjälls, and Ödemarkens son and violin on Ödemarkens son, female vocals on Norrskenssyner.
- Andreas Frank – guest lead guitar on "För kung och fosterland" & "Asatider" on Till fjälls
- Nisse Johansson – additional keys on Till fjälls and analog synth, loop editing on Visions from the Spiral Generator and Hammond on "Universums dunkla alfabet"
- Jan Erik "Tyr" Torgersen – live bass
- Steve Di Giorgio – bass guitar on Visions from the Spiral Generator and The Focusing Blur
- Asgeir Mickelson – drums on Visions from the Spiral Generator and The Focusing Blur
- Lars "Lazare" Nedland – Hammond organ on Visions from the Spiral Generator and Hammond organ, vocals, and lyricist on The Focusing Blur
- Benny Hägglund – live drums
- Johan Lindgren – live bass, bass on Solens rötter
- Andreas Stenlund – live guitar until 2002

== Discography ==
- Hedniskhjärtad (EP, 1998) ("Paganhearted")
- Till fjälls (1998) ("To the Mountains")
- Ödemarkens son (1999) ("Son of the Wilderness")
- Cosmic Genesis (2000)
- Visions from the Spiral Generator (2002)
- The Focusing Blur (2004)
- Solens rötter (2007) ("Roots of the Sun")
- Jordpuls (2011) ("Earthpulse")
- Orkan (2012) ("Hurricane")
- Naturbål (2014) ("Natural Bonfire")
- Till fjälls: Del II (2017) ("To the mountains: Part II")
- Vattenkrafternas spel (2025) ("The Play of Water Powers")
