= Otyg =

Swedish band

- Origin: Skellefteå, Sweden
- Genre: Folk metal
- Years active: 1995–2002, 2012–present
- Label: Napalm
- Members: Vintersorg; Daniel Fredriksson; Mattias Marklund; Cia Hedmark; Fredrik Nilsson

Otyg are a folk metal band from Sweden, featuring Andreas Hedlund, the frontman for Vintersorg.

During their existence, Otyg released two albums with songs written in traditional Scandinavian folk style, featuring traditional Scandinavian instruments not frequently heard in heavy metal, such as the keyed fiddle and willow flute. All the lyrics are written in Swedish.

Two songs from the band were used in the MMORPG Granado Espada: "Huldran" and "Trollslottet".

In an interview in May 2012 Andreas Hedlund stated that Otyg is now reactivated and a new album is going to be released.

In an interview in July 2014 Andreas stated that new Otyg album is already written, but he lacks the time to record it in studio.

== Discography ==
Studio albums

- Älvefärd (1998)
- Sagovindars boning (1999)

Demos

- Bergtagen (1995)
- I trollskogens drömmande mörker (1996)
- Galdersång till bergfadern (1997)

== Band members ==
=== Current line-up ===
- Vintersorg – guitars, keyboards, vocals (1995–2002, 2012–present)
- Mattias Marklund – guitars (1995–2002, 2012–present)
- Cia Hedmark – vocals, violin (1995–2002, 2012–present)
- Daniel Fredriksson – bass, keyed fiddle, willow flute, mouth harp, lute guitar (1995–2002, 2012–present)
- Fredrik Nilsson – drums (1998–2002, 2012–present)

=== Former members ===
- Samuel Norberg – mouth harp (1995–1997)
- Stefan Strömberg – drums (1995–1997)
