= Memorial (Soen album) =

Studio album by Soen
- Released: 1 September 2023
- Genre: Progressive metal; progressive rock; alternative metal
- Length: 43:01
- Label: Silver Lining
- Producer: David Castillo

Soen chronology
Imperial (2021)	Memorial (2023)	Reliance (2026)

Memorial is the sixth studio album by Swedish progressive metal band Soen. The album was released on 1 September 2023 through Silver Lining Music and was produced by David Castillo.

== Track listing ==
All tracks are written by Soen.

Memorial track listing
No.	Title	Length
1.	"Sincere"	4:35
2.	"Unbreakable"	4:12
3.	"Violence"	3:55
4.	"Fortress"	4:03
5.	"Hollowed" (featuring Elisa)	4:08
6.	"Memorial"	4:38
7.	"Incendiary"	4:33
8.	"Tragedian"	3:40
9.	"Icon"	4:10
10.	"Vitals"	5:02
Total length:		43:01

== Personnel ==
Soen

- Joel Ekelöf – lead vocals
- Cody Ford – guitar, backing vocals
- Oleksii 'Zlatoyar' Kobel – bass
- Lars Åhlund – keyboards, guitar, backing vocals
- Martin Lopez – drums, percussion

Additional musicians

- Elisa – guest vocals on track 5
- Joakim Simonsson – grand piano

Additional personnel

- David Castillo – production
- Alexander Backlund – mixing
- Tony Lindgren – mastering

== Charts ==
Chart performance for Memorial
Chart (2023)	Peak position
Dutch Albums (Album Top 100)	69
German Albums (Offizielle Top 100)	14
Swiss Albums (Schweizer Hitparade)	8
