= Torturer (band) =

Chilean metal band

- Origin: Santiago, Chile
- Genres: Death metal, thrash metal
- Years active: 1989–present
- Members: Francisco Cautín; JT García; Christiansen Oros
- Past members: Pablo Navarrete; Marco Aguilera; Manolo Schafler; Omar Flores; Rodrigo Neira; Leonardo Corvalán; Sebastián Morales; Francisco Garcés; Martín Valenzuela

Torturer is a death/thrash metal band, formed in 1989 in Santiago, Chile.

== History ==
=== Founding ===
The group was founded in May 1989 by bassist and vocalist Francisco Cautín.

=== Infest records ===
In 1990, the band recorded its first demo, Kingdom of the Dark. Two years later, they signed with French label Infest Records and recorded their debut album Oppressed by the Force.

In 1995, the band recorded and released an EP in Spanish titled Los Últimos Tiempos.

=== Lineup changes ===
In March 1997, drummer Martín Valenzuela and guitarists Sebastián Morales and Francisco Garcés joined the band. In June 1998, this lineup played alongside Kreator in front of more than 3000 audience members. That year, the band recorded the Advance L.P. 1999.

In September 1999, Garcés left the band and was replaced with Pablo Navarrete.

=== Rise from the Ashes ===
On May 25, 2001, Torturer released the album Rise from the Ashes, symbolic of the band's absence from the public's attention and subsequent "rebirth". This album marked the return of the group to the music scene and was one of the band's most internationally recognized musical works. The concert for the album was documented with a 16-track recorder and the result was the band's first live recording, entitled Live from the Ashes (2002), which continued with the genre of "death metal-thrash" and was released on the Bloodbath Records label. In July of that year, Garcés returned to the band, with the intention of contributing to Torturer's fourth album.

=== Apocalyptor Records signing ===
The band signed with Australian label, Apocalyptor Records, to release a limited edition (500 copies) picture vinyl disc of Rise from the Ashes. The vinyl record was available in 2002.

On November 1, 2003, Torturer released a new studio album, entitled Purification of the Flames. The full-length recording included seven original songs and one Sadus cover, a band that visited Chile in 2004 for the 15th anniversary of Torturer.

=== 2010 - present ===
In December 2010, Torturer was registered as an active band signed to the Rawforce Productions record label. The band subsequently released the albums Torturer (2013) and Conjuro IV (2017). The band continued to perform live, appearing at major festivals. Its most recent studio album, Burning Cross, was released in 2024.

== Band members ==
=== Current members ===
- Francisco Javier Aracena Cautín: vocals, bass (1989–present)
- Christiansen Oros: drums (2023–present)
- JT Garcia: guitar (present)

=== Past members ===
- Francisco Garcés: guitar
- Rodrigo Zuñiga Gonzalez: drums
- Marco Aguilera: guitar
- Manolo Schafler: guitar
- Sebastián Morales: guitar
- Omar Flores: drums
- Rodrigo Neira: guitars
- Leonardo Corvalán: drums
- Pablo Navarrete: guitar
- Sergio David Aravena Rivas :Guitar

== Discography ==
=== Studio albums ===
- Oppressed by the Force (1992)
- Rise from the Ashes (2001)
- The Flames of Purification (2003)
- Torturer (2013)
- Conjuro IV (2017)
- Burning Cross (2024)

=== Demos ===
- Kingdom of the Dark (1990)
- Promo Noviembre '91 (1991)
- Advance LP (1999)

=== EPs ===
- Los Últimos Tiempos (1995)

=== Live albums ===
- Live from the Ashes (2002)
- Burning Alive! (2025)

=== Splits ===
- Hater of Mankind – Kingdom of the Dark (1991)
- Eterna Tortura – Devastnation (2008)

=== Compilations ===
- Los Últimos Tiempos – Best of (2009)

== See also ==
- Music of Chile
