= Obliveon =

Canadian metal band

- Also known as: Oblivion
- Origin: Quebec, Canada
- Genres: Technical thrash metal; death metal; groove metal (later)
- Years active: 1987–2002; 2007–2008; 2014; 2021–present
- Labels: Active; ASA; Hypnotic

Obliveon is a Canadian technical thrash/death metal band from Quebec.

== History ==
The band was formed in 1987 as Oblivion, but changed the spelling after discovering a band of the same name in the United States. Obliveon's self-released second album, Nemesis, has been "lauded as a tech metal cornerstone." According to Canvas Solaris drummer Hunter Ginn, Nemesis "[sounds like] the very essence of tech." After releasing four studio albums, Obliveon disbanded in 2002 but has reunited occasionally and discussed the possibility of writing new material.

In 2023, the band started a Kickstarter campaign to fund the recording and release of their fifth album, as reissue the band's previous albums on vinyl and CD (via Floga and Awakening records, respectively). It was announced that founding bassist Stéphane Picard would step down for personal reasons. In December 2025, the band announced the departure of interim bassist Antoine Baril, and that Steve DiGiorgio would record bass for the fifth album.

== Band members ==
Current

- Martin Gagné – guitar (1987–2002, 2007–2008, 2014, 2021–present)
- Alain Demers – drums (1989–2002, 2007–2008, 2014, 2021–present)
- Pierre Rémillard – guitar (1989–2002, 2007–2008, 2014, 2021–present)
- Bruno Bernier – lead vocals (1994–2002, 2007–2008, 2014, 2021–present)

Former

- Stéphane Picard – bass (1987–2002, 2007–2008, 2014, 2021–2023); lead vocals (1987–1994); backing vocals (1994–2002, 2007–2008, 2014, 2021–2023)
- Francis Giguère – drums (1987–1989)
- Antoine Baril – bass (2023–2025)

== Discography ==
=== Studio albums ===
- From This Day Forward (1990)
- Nemesis (1993)
- Cybervoid (1995)
- Carnivore Mothermouth (1999)

=== Other releases ===
- Whimsical Uproar... (demo, 1987)
- Fiction of Veracity (demo, 1989)
- Planet Claire (EP, 1998)
- Greatest Pits (compilation, 2002)
