= Out for Blood (Sadus album) =

Studio album by Sadus
- Released: February 27, 2006
- Genre: Technical thrash metal, technical death metal
- Length: 55:43
- Label: Mascot Records
- Producer: Børge Finstad

Sadus chronology
Elements of Anger (1997)	Out for Blood (2006)	The Shadow Inside (2023)

Professional ratings
Review scores
Source	Rating
Blabbermouth.net	8.5/10
Brave Words & Bloody Knuckles	7.5/10
Metal.de	8/10

Out for Blood is the fifth album by the American thrash metal band Sadus. It was released on February 27, 2006, by Mascot Records.

== Track listing ==
CD1

1. "In the Name of..." – 6:10
2. "No More" – 4:51
3. "Smackdown" – 4:22
4. "Out for Blood" – 4:44
5. "Lost It All" – 4:38
6. "Sick" – 4:39
7. "Down" – 3:40
8. "Freedom" – 6:58
9. "Freak" – 2:57
10. "Cursed" – 8:10
11. "Crazy" – 5:40

CD2

1. "Black March" (Re-Recorded Version) – 4:59
2. "Invaders" (Re-Recorded Version 2000) (Iron Maiden cover) – 3:22
3. "Merciless Death" (Dark Angel cover) – 4:16

== Personnel ==
Sadus

- Darren Travis – guitar, vocals
- Steve Di Giorgio – bass, keyboards
- Jon Allen – drums

Production

- Børge Finstad – producer
- Juan Urteaga – engineer
- Rob Lewis – manager
