= Jordpuls =

Studio album by Vintersorg
- Released: 25 March 2011
- Genres: Folk metal, black metal, progressive metal
- Length: 46:44
- Label: Napalm
- Producer: Vintersorg

Vintersorg chronology
Solens rötter (2007)	Jordpuls (2011)	Orkan (2012)

Jordpuls ("Pulse of the Earth") is the seventh full-length album by Swedish folk metal band Vintersorg. As with the previous album Solens rötter, the lyrics are all in Swedish. This is the first of a planned four-album concept series based on the elements.

Robin Syversen of Eternal Terror rated it a five out of six.

== Track listing ==
No.	Title	Length
1.	"Världsalltets fanfar" ("Fanfare of the Universe")	05:23
2.	"Klippor och skär" ("Cliffs and Skerries")	06:12
3.	"Till dånet av forsar och fall" ("To the Roar of Rivers and Waterfalls")	04:31
4.	"Mörk nebulosa" ("Dark Nebula")	05:23
5.	"Stjärndyrkan" ("Star Worship")	05:06
6.	"Skogen sover" ("The Forest Is Asleep")	05:54
7.	"Vindögat" ("Wind's Eye")	04:34
8.	"Palissader" ("Palisades")	05:27
9.	"Eld och lågor" ("Fire and Flames")	04:14
Total length:		46:44

== Personnel ==
=== Vintersorg ===
- Andreas Hedlund - all vocals, acoustic, rhythm and lead guitars, keyboards, bass, Hammond organ, drum programming, loops and editing
- Mattias Marklund - lead and rhythm guitars

=== Production ===
- Arranged, produced and edited by Vintersorg
