= The Company of Chivalry =

- Founded: 1988
- Location: Europe, based in United Kingdom
- Period: late Fourteenth century, primarily 1370
- Earliest year portrayed: 1360 AD
- Latest year portrayed: 1390 AD
- Speciality: Combat display and living history
- Number of members: around 20
- Alliances: Early Medieval Alliance
- Website: www.companyofchivalry.org.uk

The Company of Chivalry is a living history group portraying a military company in the age of Edward III (13 November 1312 – 21 June 1377), under the command of Sir Thomas Hungerford (c. 1330 – 3 December 1397), a vassal of John of Gaunt, 1st Duke of Lancaster (March 6, 1340 – February 3, 1399).

The group performs at medieval reenactment events; with civilian living history and military combat display aspects. The Company of Chivalry is known for its display of daily life in a medieval camp and has a history of working closely with in the Castles of Wales for Cadw. The Group has previously operated medieval siege engines in the United Kingdom, and has regularly displayed the use of four types of siege engine at Caerphilly Castle in South Wales.

The society has set its effective date as 1370, during the Hundred Years War at a time when the English were ascendant against the armies of France. Within the society, the military aspect consists of soldiers who are primarily made up of billmen with a gunner in charge of a small black powder cannon, commanded by armoured knights.

== Name ==
There is not a single correct spelling for the name of the company; the group usually uses "The Company of Chivalry" or the more archaic "Ye Compaynye of Chivalrye"

== Origins and History ==
The Company of Chivalry was formed in 1988 by a group of people with a love for medieval England. The aim of the society is to recreate the daily life, culture and technology of English society in the Plantagenet period of the late fourteenth century.

== Membership ==
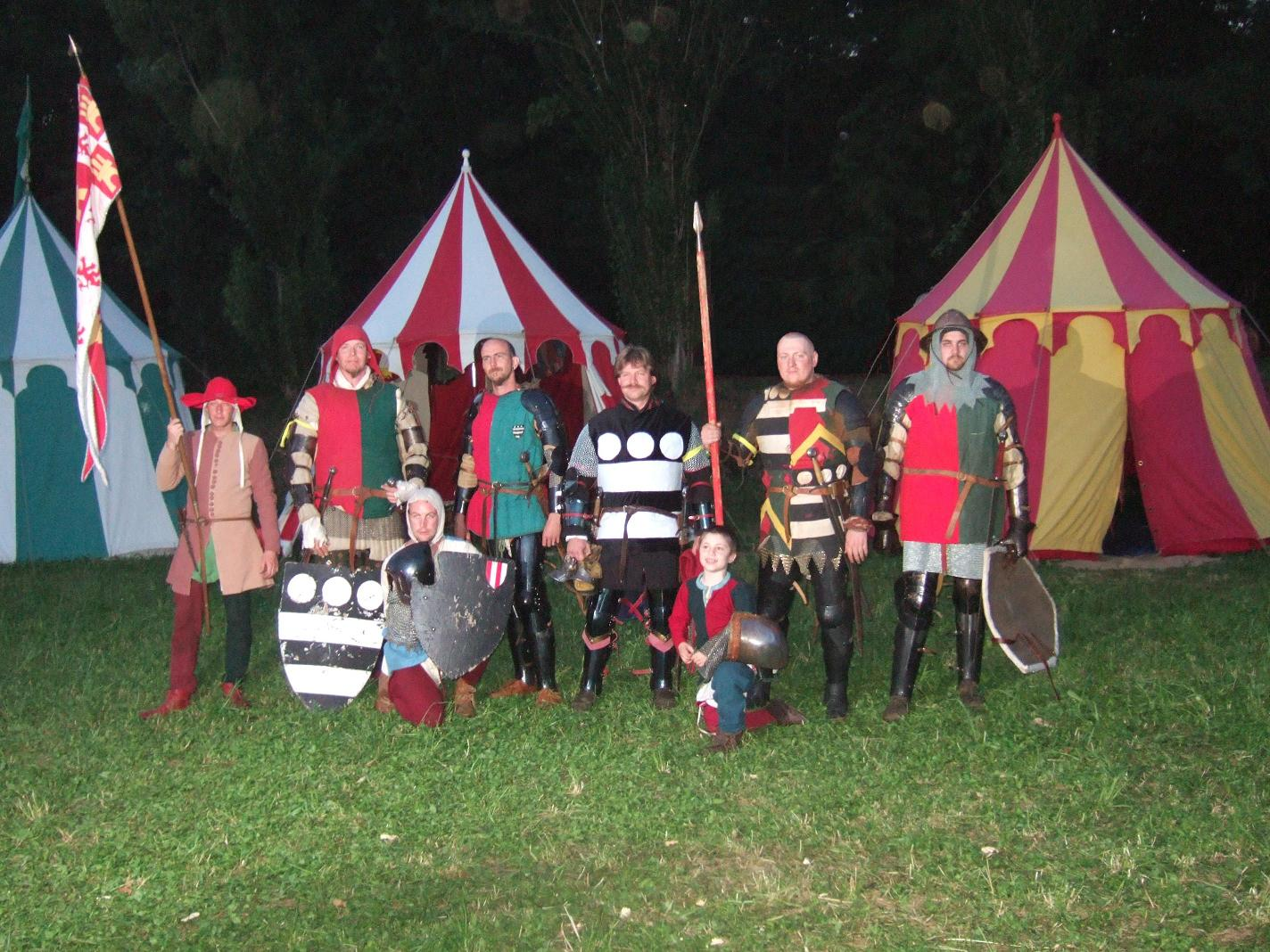
Household of Sir Thomas Hungerford

Active members of the group live in the United Kingdom; the general membership is mostly drawn from the West Country (Somerset, Bristol, Wiltshire, Devon, and Gloucestershire).

== Events ==
The Company of Chivalry has primarily worked with Cadw and English Heritage, and some privately owned properties such as Pembroke Caste; and carries out living history events in close cooperation with them. The Group usually carries out events each year/season between Easter and September, in the UK. In the past the Society developed strong links with Compagnia di Porta Giovia an Italian Reenactment Society based in Milan, Italy, and was able to travel to Morimondo, Italy annually to participate in a reenactment of The Battle of Casorate (1352) between Carlo IV of Bohemia and the Duke Visconti of Milan. The Society also attends private events.

== Video ==
- The Company of Chivalry at Farleigh Hungerford Castle June 2006
- Battle of Casorate Reenactment May 2005
