= Ödemarkens son =

Studio album by Vintersorg
- Released: 16 November 1999
- Genre: Black metal, folk metal
- Length: 44:03
- Label: Napalm
- Producer: Vintersorg, Nils Johansson

Vintersorg chronology
Till fjälls (1998)	Ödemarkens son (1999)	Cosmic Genesis (2000)

Ödemarkens son ("Son of the Wilderness") is the second full-length album by Swedish progressive/folk metal band Vintersorg. It was released on 16 November 1999. It builds on the folk metal of the previous album.

== Track listing ==
No.	Title	English translation	Length
1.	"När alver sina runor sjungit"	When Elves Have Sung Their Runes	4:47
2.	"Svältvinter"	Winter of Famine	4:36
3.	"Under norrskenets fallande ljusspel"	Under the Falling Lightplay of the Aurora	3:54
4.	"Månskensmän"	Men of Moonlight	5:46
5.	"Ödemarkens son"	Son of the Wilderness	5:17
6.	"Trollbunden"	Spellbound	2:44
7.	"Offerbäcken"	The Offering Creek	4:29
8.	"I den trolska dalens hjärta"	In the Heart of the Trollish Valley	5:55
9.	"På landet"	On the Country	6:35
Total length:			44:03

== Personnel ==
- Vintersorg - vocals, guitars, bass, acoustic guitars & keyboard on track 8

=== Additional personnel ===
- Vargher - keyboards
- Andreas Frank - lead guitar on tracks 1, 5, 8 & 9
- Cia Hedmark - vocals on tracks 2 & 4, violin
