= Till fjälls =

Studio album by Vintersorg
- Released: 8 December 1998
- Genre: Folk metal, black metal
- Length: 40:06
- Label: Napalm
- Producer: Andreas Hedlund

Vintersorg chronology
Hedniskhjärtad (1998)	Till fjälls (1998)	Ödemarkens son (1999)

Till fjälls ("To the Mountains") is the first full-length album by Swedish folk metal band Vintersorg. Stylistically this continued in the same musical vein as the previous album, Hedniskhjärtad, with black metal-style riffs, harsh vocals and blast beats interspersed with folk melodies, acoustics, and atmospherics.

== Track listing ==
No.	Title	Length
1.	"Rundans" ("Rune Dance")	01:30
2.	"För kung och fosterland" ("For the King and Motherland")	03:47
3.	"Vildmarkens förtrollande stämmor" ("The Enchanting Tunes of the Wastelands")	04:09
4.	"Till fjälls" ("To the Mountains")	06:42
5.	"Urberget, äldst av troner" ("The Bedrock, the Eldest of Thrones")	05:03
6.	"Hednad i ulvermånens tecken" ("Turned Pagan Under the Sign of the Wolf Moon")	02:23
7.	"Jökeln" ("The Glacier")	03:26
8.	"Isjungfrun" ("The Icemaid")	04:43
9.	"Asatider" ("Time of the Gods")	03:55
10.	"Fångad utav nordens själ" ("Caught by the Soul of the North")	04:28
Total length:		40:06

== Personnel ==
- Vintersorg - vocals, guitars, bass, keyboards

=== Additional personnel and staff ===
- Vargher - keyboards, drum programming
- Nils Johansson - keyboards
- Andreas Frank - lead guitar on "För kung och fosterland" and "Asatider"
- Cia Hedmark - female vocals on "Isjungfrun" and "Fångad utav nordens själ"
