= A Vision of Misery =

Studio album by Sadus
- Released: March 27, 1992
- Recorded: Hollywood, California, January–February 1992
- Genre: Thrash metal, technical death metal
- Length: 37:03
- Label: Roadrunner
- Producer: Sadus, Bill Metoyer

Sadus chronology
Swallowed in Black (1990)	''A Vision of Misery'' (1992)	Elements of Anger (1997)

Professional ratings
Review scores
Source	Rating
AllMusic	3/5 stars

A Vision of Misery is the third full-length album by the thrash metal band Sadus, released in 1992.

Reissued by Displeased Records in 2007 with a bonus DVD, also reissued in January 2007 by Metal Mind Productions as a Deluxe digipak gold-disc edition with two bonus Demo tracks taken from the 1987 Demo album Certain Death Demo as well as liner notes.

== Background and writing ==
Sadus bassist Steve Di Giorgio recalled the album's writing process: "I would say it was our most quickly composed album. We didn’t have the time of developing older demo songs, they were all new ideas and came at a time when there was a lot going on otherwise. We finished the touring cycle for Swallowed In Black in June/July of 91, and prior to that I was in Florida recording with Death. We got to the song writing soon after the tour. But I had a minor surgery in this time that took me out of rehearsing with the band for a little while, although I used the time to form some of my own compositions. Shortly after recovering from surgery I went to record with Autopsy around the end of the year. Right after the turn of the year, early 1992, we were in the studio in California with Bill Metoyer recording these songs that would be A Vision Of Misery. The writing was a little more evenly spread too as Darren wrote four, me three and Rob two songs each. So without one person having a huge work load, I think it was able to come together quicker than other Sadus records."

== Recording and production ==
Di Giorgio recalled the album's recording process in 2017: "Bill Metoyer was not only an easy going guy that made some of our out-of-the-norm ideas becomes real, but was also a great teacher. I was curious and excited to learn the console controls and run the tape machine, and he was a calm mentor to me. And this also helped the recording process as I was running the studio for some of the guitar recording. Being involved us three guys (me, Darren & Rob) in writing, the language of the riffs was easy to navigate without explaining to someone new to the complexities of hyper-speed fretboard gymnastics. And obviously sitting there next to Bill during the mix helped me appreciate how to listen to the whole spectrum when I was used to just focusing on my instrument like most do."

== Music and lyrics ==
Some of the album's tracks have been described as "epitomizing technical death metal." The album contains dual basslines in addition to dual guitar harmonies. According to Aaron Maltz of Invisible Oranges, some of the album's riffs "sound more like classic prog on amphetamines than metal." Sadus bassist Steve Di Giorgio explained: "I think as always we all had our individual influences that provided self-inspiration. As experienced musicians at this point in early 1992 I think working with professional bands like Obituary and Sepultura and Hexx... Ideas that translated into the Sadus world influenced how we organized and conducted some procedures. But sound wise, I think we had our own sound that we were working on developing and evolving deep in our secret lab of brutality."

Di Giorgio explained the album's lyrical approach: "We had come out of our “world decay” phase with Swallowed and were writing more about fictional and history based epic story type lyrics, along with a little more personal experience type lyrics. Lyrically for me 'Under The Knife' had obvious experiences integrated from my hospital visit during this time. And I also concluded the trilogy of an idea that ran across the first 3 albums. Beginning with the song “Illusions”, then “Images” and finally an idea for a song simply called “Visions” (which stayed as part of the title idea) that was scrapped and some of the lyrics ended up as the foundation for 'Echoes of Forever.'"

== Reception and legacy ==
Eduardo Rivadavia of AllMusic gave the album three stars out of five, and wrote: "Although they certainly lose some of their sharp claws due to the overall denser guitar sound chosen here, it's actually the band's increasing reliance on mid-paced tempos and repetitive riffs that winds up dragging down other selections like "Slave to Misery" and the way overlong but otherwise solid "Facelift." Even so, for fans of Sadus' habitually inventive arrangements and sharp dynamic shifts, there's plenty on offer here."

The album is considered to have been overlooked upon release. Steve Di Giorgio reflected in 2017: "That album came out at a time when our record company was saturated with underground metal bands, and our relationship with them deteriorated over disagreements. I think they put some minimal effort into promoting it, but like I said, their attention was being exhausted with other bands. So I agree in the sense that it was massively overlooked by those in position to help us build more of a fan base and sell more ‘units’ as they called ‘em. But for the awesome cult level, under-the-radar following that has always been there for us and supported us all along... to them it’s a type of thrash masterpiece. We’ve always appreciated the closeness with these metalheads and they’ve kept us going despite this and all our albums being overlooked."

== Track listing ==
All tracks are written by Sadus.

No.	Title	Length
1.	"Through the Eyes of Greed"	4:17
2.	"Valley of Dry Bones"	2:22
3.	"Machines"	3:52
4.	"Slave to Misery"	4:01
5.	"Throwing Away the Day"	3:43
6.	"Facelift"	7:00
7.	"Deceptive Perceptions"	3:35
8.	"Under the Knife"	2:11
9.	"Echoes of Forever"	6:00
Total length:		37:03

=== 2006 reissue bonus tracks ===
No.	Title	Length
10.	"Hands of Fate"	4:15
11.	"Number One"	5:42
Total length:		47:00

=== 2007 reissue bonus DVD ===
1. "Through the eyes of greed (Oakland '92 live)"
2. "Valley of dry bones (Oakland '92 live)"
3. "Facelift (Oakland '92 live)"
4. "Certain death (Oakland '92 live)"
5. "Deceptive perceptions (Oakland '92 live)"
6. "Hands of fate (Oakland '92 live)"
7. "Echoes of forever (Oakland '92 live)"
8. "Throwing away the day (Oakland '92 live)"
9. "Machines (Oakland '92 live)"
10. "In your face (Oakland '92 live)"
11. "Sadus attack (Oakland '92 live)"
12. "Slave to misery (Oakland '92 live)"
13. "Live clips and behind the scenes (NY '90)"

== Credits ==
- Darren Travis – guitar, Vocals
- Rob Moore – guitar
- Steve Di Giorgio – bass
- Jon Allen – drums

The cover art was done by Jason Garvin, and the photos were done by Jeff Moore and Joe Giron. The drumkit used on the record was provided by John "Hexx" Shafer.

== Charts ==
=== Monthly ===
Year	Chart	Position
2007	Poland (ZPAV Top 100)	44
