= Dark Hall =

Jazz fusion band formed in 1992

Dark Hall is an instrumental Jazz fusion band formed in April 1992.

== Biography ==
The band started out as a trio with bassist Steve Di Giorgio, drummer Chris Dugan, and saxophone/flute player Flamp Sorvari. They were initially only a studio project, but soon after forming, they added guitarist Eric Cutler to the lineup. They recorded a demo they named Solace and distributed it through mail orders, local distributors, and several underground music fan-zines. In 1995, Cutler was replaced by Ken Schultz. The band released another untitled demo with 5 songs, which helped them become noticed and play more live shows. Another demo was recorded in 1998, and due to it being no longer produced, the 4 songs are available for download on their web site, along with 1 song from the 1994 demo.

== Line-up ==
- Steve Di Giorgio - Bass
- Chris Dugan - Drums
- Flamp Sorvari - Sax/Flute
- Eric Cutler (until 1995) - Guitar
- Ken Schultz (after 1995) - Guitar
