= Swallowed in Black =

Studio album by Sadus
- Released: September 11, 1990
- Recorded: May / June 1990 at Fantasy Studios, Berkeley, CA.
- Genre: Thrash metal, death metal
- Length: 44:38
- Label: Roadrunner

Sadus chronology
Illusions (1988)	Swallowed in Black (1990)	A Vision of Misery (1992)

Professional ratings
Review scores
Source	Rating
AllMusic	3.5/5 stars

Swallowed in Black is the second full-length album by Sadus released in 1990. Reissued by Displeased Records in 2007 with 3 bonus tracks and a videoclip.

== Music ==
Swallowed in Black has been categorized as "right on the borderline between thrash and death metal." The music has been said to be more melodic than on its predecessor, Illusions. The album incorporates clean guitar tones on some tracks. Steve Di Giorgio's bass playing has been called "blinding and intricate."

== Reception ==
Eduardo Rivadavia of AllMusic wrote: "DiGiorgio effectively makes his case for the high demand he would enjoy as an extreme metal session player in years to come. As for Sadus, the band, their standing as favorite sons of the first death metal wave remains secure, thanks to fine efforts like Swallowed in Black."

== Track listing ==
All tracks are written by Sadus.

No.	Title	Length
1.	"Black"	5:25
2.	"Man Infestation"	4:06
3.	"Last Abide"	2:18
4.	"The Wake"	4:21
5.	"In Your Face"	1:03
6.	"Good Rid'nz"	4:33
7.	"False Incarnation"	4:37
8.	"Images"	4:25
9.	"Powers of Hate"	3:40
10.	"Arise"	6:18
11.	"Oracle of Obmission"	3:49
Total length:		44:38

== 2007 Reissue bonus tracks ==
12. "The wake (demo)"
13. "Powers of Hate (demo)"
14. "Good Rid'nz (demo)"
15. "Good Rid'nz (video clip)"

== Credits ==
- Darren Travis – guitar, vocals
- Rob Moore – guitar
- Steve Di Giorgio – bass
- Jon Allen – drums

== Charts ==
=== Monthly ===
Year	Chart	Position
2007	Poland (ZPAV Top 100)	45
