= Mattias Marklund =

Swedish musician

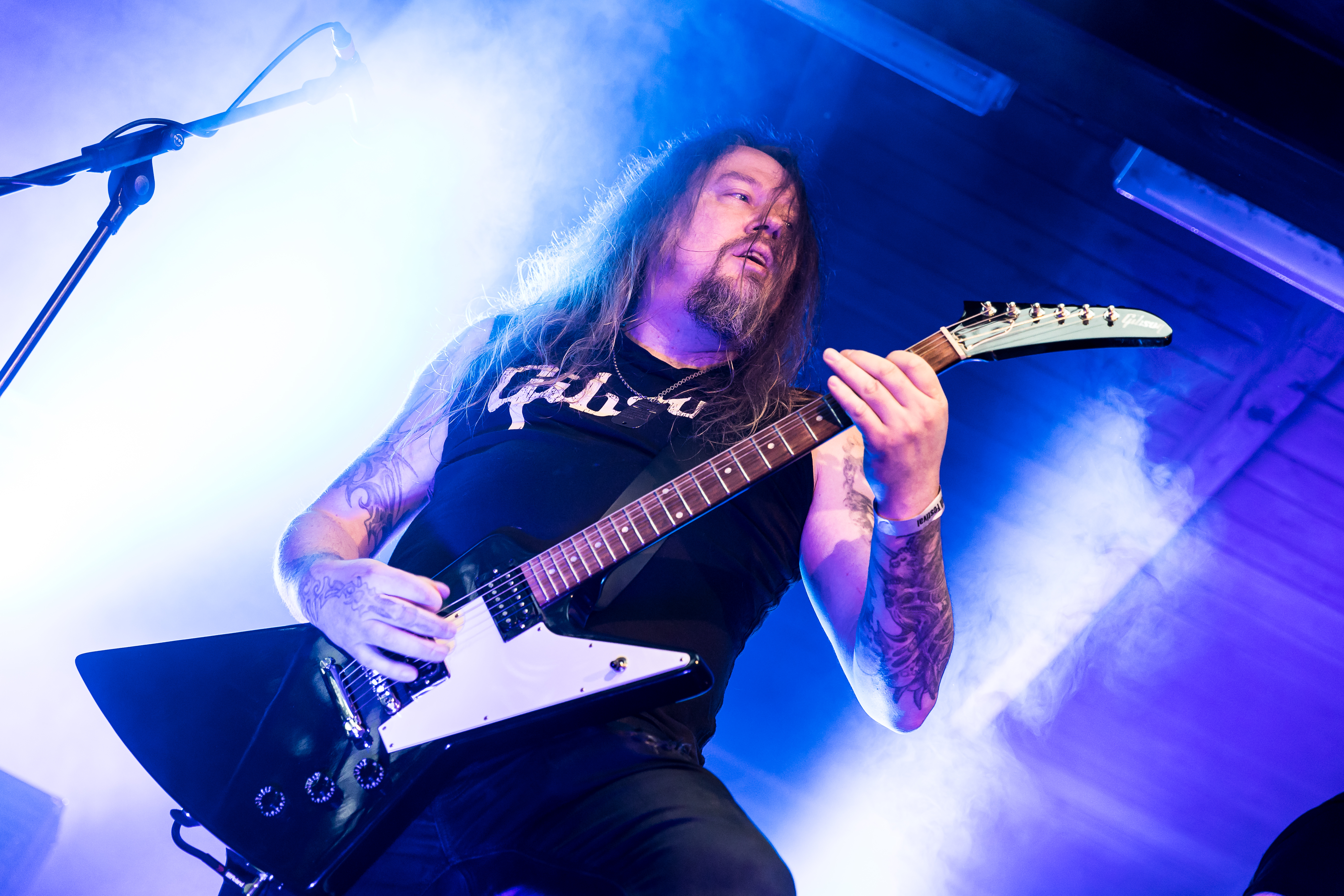
Marklund in 2025

Mattias Marklund (born 14 September 1974) is a guitarist who plays in Vintersorg, Casket Casey, The Derelict Dead, and TME. He also did guest guitar work for Vintersorg bandmate, Andreas Hedlund's progressive rock band, Waterclime.

== Discography ==
=== With Otyg ===
- Bergtagen (demo, 1995)
- I Trollskogens Drömmande Mörker (demo, 1996)
- Galdersång till Bergfadern (demo, 1997)
- Älvefärd (full-length, 1998)

Sagovindars Boning (full-length, 1999)

=== With Vintersorg ===
- Cosmic Genesis (full-length, 2000)
- Visions from the Spiral Generator (full-length, 2002)
- The Focusing Blur (full-length, 2004)
- Solens rötter (full-length, 2007)
- Jordpuls (full-length, 2011)
- Naturbål (full-length, 2014)
- Till fjälls: Del II (full-length, 2017)

=== With Casket Casey ===
- Coffin' up Bones (EP, 2004)

=== With Waterclime ===
- The Astral Factor (full-length, 2006)

=== With TME ===
- Worlds Collide (full-length, 2007)
