= Visions from the Spiral Generator =

Studio album by Vintersorg
- Released: 24 June 2002
- Recorded: 2001–2002
- Genre: Progressive metal, avant-garde metal, black metal
- Length: 40:53
- Label: Napalm
- Producer: Vintersorg

Vintersorg chronology
Cosmic Genesis (2000)	Visions from the Spiral Generator (2002)	The Focusing Blur (2004)

Professional ratings
Review scores
Source	Rating
Allmusic	4/5 stars

Visions from the Spiral Generator is the fourth full-length album by Swedish progressive/folk metal band Vintersorg. It was released on 24 June 2002. This album saw a drastic shift in style of the band that was foreshadowed on their prior album, Cosmic Genesis. The lyrics remained mixed between English and Swedish, and the music continued to be even more progressive and technical, moving further away from the band's original folk influences.

== Track listing ==
- All songs written and arranged by Vintersorg.

No.	Title	Length
1.	"Quotation"	00:50
2.	"Vem styr symmetrin?" ("Who Controls the Symmetry?")	04:35
3.	"A Metaphysical Drama"	05:20
4.	"Universums dunkla alfabet" ("The Mysterious Alphabet of the Universe")	04:33
5.	"E.S.P. Mirage"	05:00
6.	"Spegelsfären" ("The Mirrorsphere")	06:10
7.	"The Explorer"	06:47
8.	"A Star-Guarded Coronation"	05:16
9.	"Trance Locator"	02:22
Total length:		40:53

== Personnel ==
=== Vintersorg ===
- Mr. V - all vocals, rhythm and lead guitars, keyboard, Hammond, loop editing
- Mattias Marklund - lead and rhythm guitars

=== Additional musicians ===
- Asgeir Mickelson - drums
- Steve Di Giorgio - bass
- Nils Johansson - analogue synth, loop editing, Hammond on "Universums dunkla alfabet"
- Lazare - Hammond on "A Metaphysical Drama"

== Production ==
- Produced by Vintersorg
- Engineered by Vintersorg and Børge Finstad
- Mixed by Børge Finstad
- Editing by Jeff Wagner
