= Ronald S. Cok =

American inventor

Ronald S. Cok (born 1959) is a scientist, engineer, and prolific inventor with 563 U.S. patents as of Oct. 1, 2021. The child of missionary parents, he spent most of his childhood years in newly independent Nigeria. Originally posted to a primary school in Zaki Biam, his family moved across the Katsina Ala River to the Teacher Training College at Mkar where his father taught at the college and supervised a network of primary schools. While at Mkar, Cok’s family lived in a grass-roofed house with no running water or electrical power, and was involved in a hunt for a rogue hippopotamus. A few years later, the family moved to the nearby town of Gboko, where his father constructed, administered, and taught at the W. M. Bristow Secondary School.

After graduation from Hillcrest high school, Cok returned to the US to attend Calvin College, where he received BA degrees in physics and mathematics, and then continued his studies at the University of Michigan, attaining a Master of Science in Electrical Science, Electrical and Computer Engineering. Since finishing his studies, he has lived mostly in upstate New York with his family. Cok spent three years living and working in England, where his twin daughters were born and their older sister temporarily acquired a very posh accent. He enjoys making things, visiting other countries and cultures, and outdoor activities, and has run the 2008, 2010, and 2011 Boston Marathons.

Cok was employed by Eastman Kodak from 1981 until 2015, eventually becoming a Research Fellow. He has worked in various fields, including image processing and Organic LED displays. He was recognized as the USA Top Inventor for 2003-2005 in the field of organic semiconductors by Organic Semiconductor Analyst Direct magazine and received an R&D 100 award for Innovation and Excellence. He is also author of a parallel processing computer science textbook, Parallel Programs for the Transputer. He taught at the Rochester Institute of Technology Computer Engineering graduate school between 1992 and 1994.

In subsequent years, Cok earned a Patent Agent certification with the United States Patent and Trademark Office and worked as the Director of Intellectual Property with X-Celeprint, Inc., a leader in micro-transfer printing. In 2016, Cok published a memoir of his life in Nigeria, Down Bush: A Boy’s Life in Africa.

== See also ==
- List of prolific inventors
