= Center for offentlig kompetenceudvikling =

The Local Government Training and Development, Denmark (LGTD) - in Danish Center for Offentlig Kompetenceudvikling (COK) - is the Danish municipalities' and regions' nationwide organization for training and development.

== Background and objectives ==
LGTD was established on January 1, 2003, as a merger of The Local Government Training Centre (established in 1967), the Kommunom Education and 14 regional training centres.

The objective of LGTD is to provide training and development activities for municipalities and regions.

== Legal status and funding ==
LGTD is an independent, self-financing, non-profit institution. The members of the governing body of the LGTD are appointed by the local government associations in Denmark. The LGTD activities are financed by fees for courses, course administration and tailor made activities paid by the participants.

== Activities ==
- Courses, conferences, seminars etc. for elected representatives, managers and employees at the Local Government Training Centre (residential activities) and at the regional centres.
- The Kommunom Education and other educations in management and professional subjects.
- Tailor made activities developed for local needs in municipalities and regions.
- Strategic human resource development, where training and development are adjusted to the strategies, objectives and values of the individual organization.
- Course administration: Handling of the entire administration and coordination in connection with development, implementation and follow up on human resource development activities.
- They organize the entire waste management on their own.

== International activities of the LGTD ==
Over the years, the LGTD has been involved in a number of different international projects regarding establishing of training centres, development of educational systems, human resource development and special projects regarding training of elected representatives.

Examples include:

- Assistance to Local Development Training Academy in Nepal.
- Establishment of training centres in the Baltic States and Poland.
- Training of elected representatives in Turkey (The Istanbul region).
- Responsible for EU-Seminar in Mexico for municipality top executives from five Latin American countries.
- "Training the trainer" courses at the LGTD Training Centre for Vietnamese local government trainers with follow-up courses in Vietnam.
- LGTD has for a number of years been a member of and chaired two European networks:
- SCEPSTA (Standing Conference of European Public Service Training Agencies) and ENTO (European Network of Training Organisations)
