= Chain of command (disambiguation) =

A chain of command is the hierarchical line of authority and responsibility in which one rank obeys the one above it, usually used in the military or law enforcement agencies.

Chain of command may also refer to:

- Chain of Command (1994 film), a 1994 action TV film starring Michael Dudikoff
- Chain of Command (2000 film), a 2000 political thriller TV film starring Roy Scheider and Patrick Muldoon
- Chain of Command (2015 film), a 2015 film starring Michael Jai White
- Chain of Command (novel), a 2021 novel by Marc Cameron, part of the Jack Ryan series
- Chain of Command: The Road from 9/11 to Abu Ghraib, a 2004 nonfiction book by investigative journalist Seymour Hersh
- Chain of Command, a 2017 novel by Frank Chadwick
- Chain of Command (album), a 2004 album by power metal group Jag Panzer
- "Chain of Command" (Star Trek: The Next Generation), a 1992 two-part episode of the TV series Star Trek: The Next Generation
- "Chains of Command", a 1995 episode of the TV series seaQuest 2032
- "Chain of Command", a 1996 episode of the animated series Beast Wars: Transformers
- "Chain of Command", a 2007 episode of the animated series Legion of Super Heroes
