= Scariot =

Norwegian progressive metal band

- Origin: Kristiansand, Norway
- Genres: Progressive metal
- Years active: 1997–present
- Labels: Demolition; OS Music; FaceFront; Candlelight
- Members: Daniel Olaisen; Øyvind Hægeland; Asgeir Mickelson; Steve Di Giorgio

Scariot is a Norwegian progressive metal band founded by Daniel Olaisen in 1997. The band has been through several lineup changes, and Olaisen is the only original member still remaining.

Their fourth and latest album, Momentum Shift, was released in Scandinavia in February and in Europe and North America in May 2007.

== Discography ==
- Deathforlorn (2000)
- Toungeless God (2001)
- Strange to Numbers (2003)
- Momentum Shift (2007)

== Band members ==
=== Current lineup ===
- Daniel Olaisen – guitars
- Øyvind Hægeland – vocals (also plays some lead guitar and bass)
- Asgeir Mickelson – drums
- Steve Di Giorgio – bass

=== Previous members ===
- Oddleif Stensland – vocals
- Ronny Thorsen – vocals
- Geir Solli – vocals
- Bernt Fjellestad – vocals
- Frank Ørland – guitars
- Hugo Isaksen – guitars
- Steffan Schultze – bass/vocals
- Bjørnar Svendsen – bass
- Anders Kobro – drums
- Tor Atle Andersen – drums
