= Elements of Anger =

Studio album by Sadus
- Released: September 21, 1997
- Recorded: 1997
- Genre: Thrash metal, death metal, groove metal
- Length: 49:33
- Label: Mascot Records; Taraneh Records
- Producer: Scott Burns

Sadus chronology
A Vision of Misery (1992)	Elements of Anger (1997)	Out for Blood (2006)

Professional ratings
Review scores
Source	Rating
Chronicles of Chaos	7/10
Metal.de	6/10

Elements of Anger is the fourth album by the American thrash metal band Sadus.

This album marked the band's first release under Mascot and Taraneh Records and also the first without guitarist Rob Moore.

== Track listing ==
No.	Title	Length
1.	"Aggression"	4:44
2.	"Crutch"	5:52
3.	"Words of War"	4:22
4.	"Safety in Numbers"	6:49
5.	"Mask"	7:20
6.	"Fuel"	2:31
7.	"Power of One"	3:20
8.	"Stronger Than Life"	4:50
9.	"Unreality"	5:36
10.	"In the End"	4:09
Total length:		49:33

== Credits ==
- Darren Travis – guitar, vocals
- Steve Di Giorgio – bass, keyboards
- Jon Allen – drums
