= Christian Labour Confederation =

KOK
- Christian Labour Confederation
- Křesťanská odborová koalice
- Headquarters: Prague, Czech Republic
- Location: Czech Republic
- Key people: Anton Alois, president
- Affiliations: ITUC
- Website: http://www.krestanskeodbory.cz/

The Christian Labour Confederation (KOK) (Czech: Křesťanská odborová koalice) is a trade union centre in the Czech Republic. It is affiliated with the International Trade Union Confederation.
