= Christian Wentz =

American electrical engineer and entrepreneur

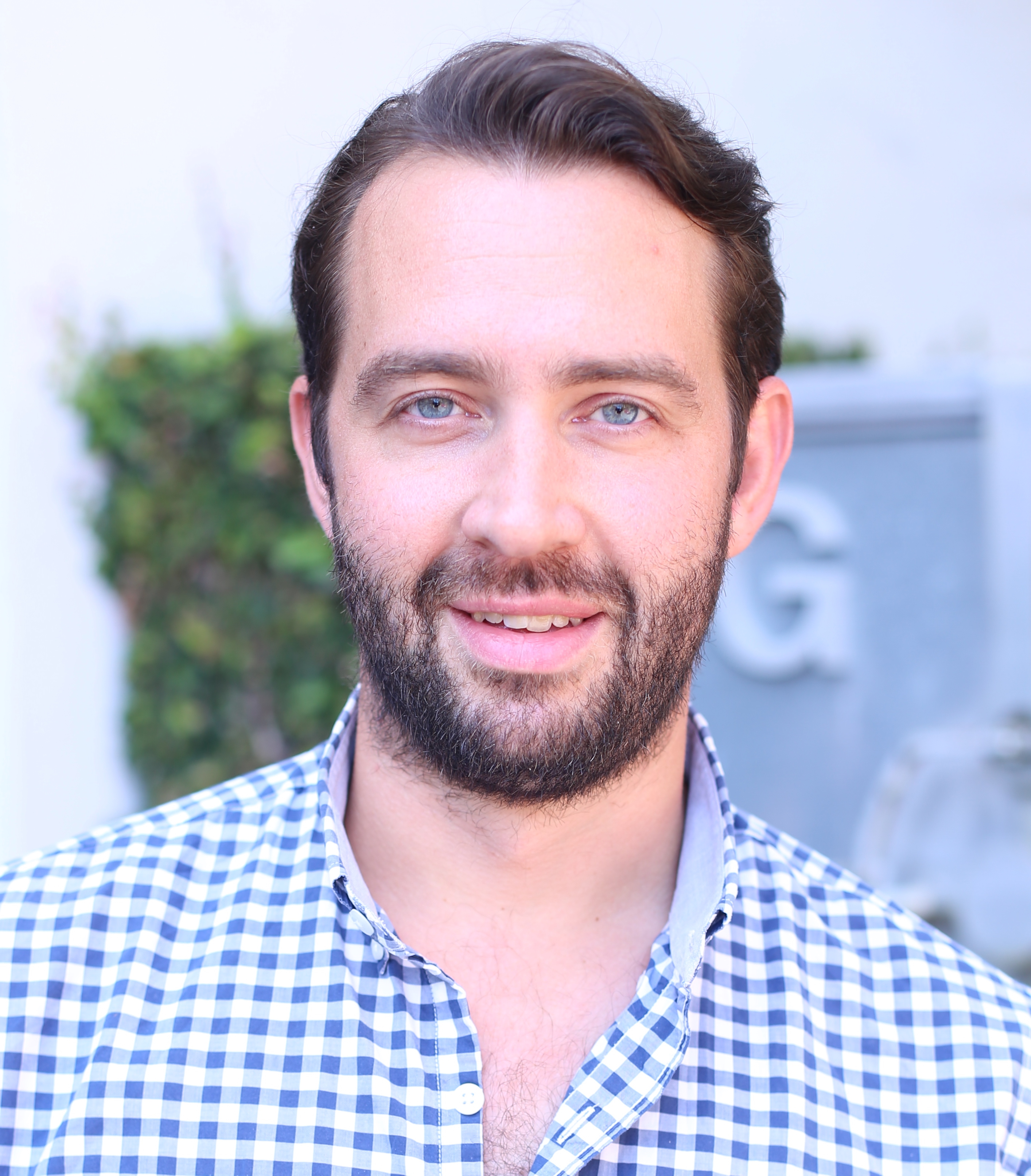
- Christian T. Wentz
- Born: 1986 (age 39–40); Wausau, Wisconsin
- Education: MIT
- Scientific career
- Workplaces: MIT; Cerenova Inc.; Kendall Research Systems; Misfit (company) acquired by Fossil Group; Kernel (neurotechnology company); Gradient Technologies

Christian T. Wentz is an American electrical engineer and entrepreneur. He is recognized for his work in engineering authenticity in electronic devices and the use of these primitives in distributed systems, developing neural interface technologies and innovation in optoelectronics, low power circuit design, Wireless power and high bandwidth communication technologies.

== Early life ==
Wentz grew up in Wausau, Wisconsin. He graduated from Wausau East High School in 2004.

Wentz received a bachelor of science degree in electrical science and engineering in 2009 from the Massachusetts Institute of Technology (MIT). He received his master of engineering degree in electrical engineering and computer science in 2010 from MIT. He returned to MIT in 2013 to pursue a PhD with the support of the Myhrvold & Havranek Hertz Foundation Fellowship in applied sciences. His PhD work focused on development of minimally invasive biosensors.

As of 2017, Wentz is on leave from MIT to pursue entrepreneurial ventures.

== Career ==
As an undergraduate student at MIT in the lab of Edward Boyden, Wentz developed wireless neural interface technology using optogenetics, and worked on ultra-low power circuit technology for large-scale acquisition of neural signals.

In 2011, based on this work, Wentz founded Kendall Research Systems, LLC (KRS). KRS became the first company to commercialize wireless optogenetics instrumentation for use in the pharmaceutical industry and translational neuroscience. The company bootstrapped itself until it received support from the National Institutes of Health (NIH). KRS explored ultra-low power signal processing topologies to capture signals from large numbers of neurons in devices implanted in humans, e.g. deep brain stimulators.

In 2010, while still a student at MIT, he co-founded Cerenova, Inc, a spinout from Massachusetts General Hospital Department of Neurosurgery, with noted functional neurosurgeon Emad Eskandar. Their work focused on novel applications of electrical neuromodulation for recovery and improvement of learning and cognition.

In February 2017, KRS' neurotechnology assets were acquired by Kernel for an undisclosed sum. Following the acquisition, Wentz served as Vice President of Product at Kernel, leading development program in clinical neural interfaces.

In August 2018, Wentz announced the establishment and funding of Gradient Technologies, Inc., a venture focused on engineering trust into everyday electronic devices such that "the authenticity and integrity of every electronic device, the software it operates, data it stores and computes, and information itself, are provable qualities by construction, not by trust in a third party".

Previously, Wentz worked on hardware for wearable technology company Misfit, Inc. Misfit was acquired by Fossil Group in November 2015 for $260 million.

== Recognition ==
In 2011, Wentz was named to the inaugural Forbes 30 Under 30 in Science and Innovation for his work in neurotechnology.

In 2012, Wentz received the Myhrvold & Havranak Family Hertz Foundation Fellowship in applied sciences to pursue a PhD at MIT.
