= Sadus =

American thrash metal band

- Origin: Antioch, California, U.S.
- Genres: Thrash metal, technical thrash metal, death metal
- Years active: 1985–2015, 2017–present
- Labels: Roadrunner, Mascot/Taraneh, Nuclear Blast
- Members: Darren Travis
- Past members: Steve Di Giorgio; Rob Moore; Jon Allen

Sadus is an American thrash metal band from Antioch, California, active from 1985^{[A]} to 2015, and reunited in 2017. Originally a quartet, the band fuses thrash with death metal, featuring technical musicianship. They are known for vocalist Darren Travis's death growl and bassist Steve Di Giorgio. Sadus has released six studio albums, one compilation album and four demos, and has undergone a few lineup changes. Travis is the only constant member of the band.

Greg Prato of AllMusic dubbed Sadus "East Bay metal legends".

== History ==
=== Formation, early albums and split with Rob Moore (1985–1993) ===
Singer Darren Travis, guitarist Rob Moore, bassist Steve Di Giorgio, and drummer Jon Allen formed Sadus in 1985. A year later, the band released the demo tape D.T.P. (Death to Posers). Two of its tracks were included on the 1987 Raging Death compilation album. Capitalizing on this achievement, Sadus self-financed their debut album with Metal Church guitarist John Marshall as producer. They also signed with Roadrunner Records, resulting in a further album, Swallowed in Black, and touring with Sepultura and Obituary.

Sadus was put on hold in 1991 as Di Giorgio assisted Death on their Human album. Roadrunner re-released the Illusions debut, retitled Chemical Exposure, as Sadus regrouped for a summer American tour opening for Morbid Angel. Although a further album for Roadrunner, 1992's A Vision of Misery, resulted in a European headline tour, Sadus was without a label when they returned. Di Giorgio rejoined Death for the Individual Thought Patterns album and a year-long tour. Di Giorgio returned for club shows with Sadus while Moore left the band.

=== Sadus as a trio, Elements of Anger and hiatus (1993–2005) ===
Sadus continued as a trio, recording the Scott Burns-produced Elements of Anger in 1997. Di Giorgio and drummer Jon Allen formed the side project Dragonheart (later Dragonlord) with former Vicious Rumours and current Testament guitarist Steve Smyth and his fellow Testament guitar player, Eric Peterson. Di Giorgio joined Iced Earth in late 2000. During the summer of 2002, Travis and Di Giorgio embarked on an all-star union billed as Suicide Shift. The project allied the Sadus pairing with Testament vocalist Chuck Billy, drummer Per Moller Jensen of The Haunted, and Death and Cancer guitarist James Murphy. The Hammerheart label issued the band's original Death To Posers 1986 demo onto CD in 2003, addingCertain Death, from a 1988 session, as a bonus.

Sadus announced they were to partner up with fellow thrash veterans Nasty Savage and high-profile Finnish act Finntroll for European mainland dates in December. However, just days after the official press release confirming these shows the band withdrew as drummer Jon Allen's commitments to his 11-year-old daughter, who had just undergone open heart surgery, took precedence.

Despite Steve Di Giorgio commitments in 2004 to Testament, the band did increase activity that year. In April the group toured Europe, taking in shows in Greece, Italy, Sweden and appearing at Norway's Inferno Metal Festival in Oslo. Di Giorgio then took time out to record with Artension then hit the European festival circuit with Testament. Gigs in August marked a first for Sadus as they toured Chile alongside Torturer whilst on South American dates. New Sadus material would be laid down throughout September and October before Di Giorgio joined the ranks of Sebastian Bach's band for further European touring in December. The bassist would also be announced as a contributor to recordings for Norwegian act Scariot in early 2005.

=== Out for Blood and another hiatus (2006–2016) ===
Sadus, together with producer Brage Finstad, entered Trident Studios in Pacheco, California to record their fifth album for a late summer 2006 release via Mascot Records. In March 2006 Jon Allen manned the drum kit for live work with Testament. That same month found Di Giorgio involving himself in a studio collaboration with singer Björn Strid, of Soilwork, Terror 2000 and Coldseed, Glen Alvelais from Forbidden, Testament and LD/50 and Jeremy Colson of the Steve Vai band, Marty Friedman, Michael Schenker, Apartment 26, Dali'S Dilemma and LD/50 repute.

On November 18 the band appeared at the Monterrey Metal Fest event at the Auditorio Coca-Cola in Mexico alongside Blind Guardian, Cathedral, U.D.O., Edguy, Obituary, Deicide, Leaves' Eyes, Bludgeon, Vainglory, Hydrogyn and Joe Stump's Reign of Terror. Sadus was announced as teaming up with Destruction, Hirax and Municipal Waste for a North American tour throughout January and February 2007. However, the group dropped off these dates as new year broke. Sadus lined up the South American 'Fuera Por Sangre' dates hitting Venezuela, Ecuador and Colombia in April prior to supporting Obituary in Mexico during May. In 2009 Sadus veterans Jon Allen and Steve Di Giorgio were noted as founder members of Futures End. Di Giorgio rejoined Testament in 2014 and played on their 2016 album Brotherhood of the Snake.

=== Reunion (2017–present) ===
On August 20, 2017, Darren Travis confirmed via Facebook that Sadus would be releasing new material. In October of that year, Travis posted two videos from the studio teasing new music from the band. Former bassist Steve Di Giorgio was not part of the reunion. In November 2017, Travis told Blabbermouth.net: "I have been working on new material for quite sometime with drummer Jon Allen in his personal studio in Texas. I am going to record again in Trident Studios in the next few weeks for two/three new tracks. Guitars and voice. Teasers will be posted on Facebook via YouTube links. Then full songs soon."

On November 18, 2022, Sadus announced that they had signed a deal with Nuclear Blast Records for the 2023 release of their new album, and on the same day, they released their first song in 16 years called "It's the Sickness". The band's sixth studio album, and their first in 17 years, The Shadow Inside was released on November 17, 2023.

On December 4, 2024, Allen was fired from the band following allegations and leaked video footage of abuse toward Allen's significant other, who was hooked up to a dialysis machine. The video also appeared to show his significant other's son unsuccessfully attempting to intervene. Travis released a statement saying, "Upon recent allegations of misconduct.. Sadus will be parting ways with Jon Allen.. I do not condone any type of malicious behavior towards any person." Allen's firing leaves Travis as the only remaining original member left in Sadus. The allegations also resulted in the band getting dropped from both Nuclear Blast and a then-ongoing European tour with Obituary.

== Musical style and legacy ==
Sadus' style has been described as "uncompromising," and is rooted in thrash metal and technical death metal. According to Aaron Maltz of Invisible Oranges: "Complex metal riffing is not revelatory, but Sadus knew how to write a finalized, technical piece of metal. They had an uncanny sense of when riffs should change and when songs should deviate, and [brought] those elements to a creative peak in 1992."

== Band members ==
Current lineup

- Darren Travis – lead vocals, guitars (1985–2015, 2017–present), bass, keyboards (2017–present)

Former members

- Jon Allen – drums, percussion (1985–2015, 2017–2024)
- Steve Di Giorgio – bass, keyboards, backing vocals (1985–2015)
- Rob Moore – guitars (1985–1993)

== Discography ==
=== Studio albums ===
- Illusions (1988) (Chemical Exposure on the CD and cassette editions)
- Swallowed in Black (1990)
- A Vision of Misery (1992)
- Elements of Anger (1997)
- Out for Blood (2006)
- The Shadow Inside (2023)

=== Compilations ===
- Chronicles of Chaos (1997)

=== Demos ===
- D.T.P. (1986) (originally released as a demo, reissued as a studio album with Certain Death in 2003)
- Certain Death (1987)
- The Wake of Severity (1989)
- Red Demo (1994)

=== Splits ===
- Raging Death (1987) (split release with bands Lethal Presence, Xecutioner who would later change their name to Obituary, Betrayel, and R.A.V.A.G.E. who would later change their name to Atheist)

== Notes ==
- Although 1984 is commonly listed as the band's founding date, one of the members has claimed that the Sadus name was suggested in 1985 by their friend Rick Rogers.
