= Steve Di Giorgio =

American bassist (born 1967)

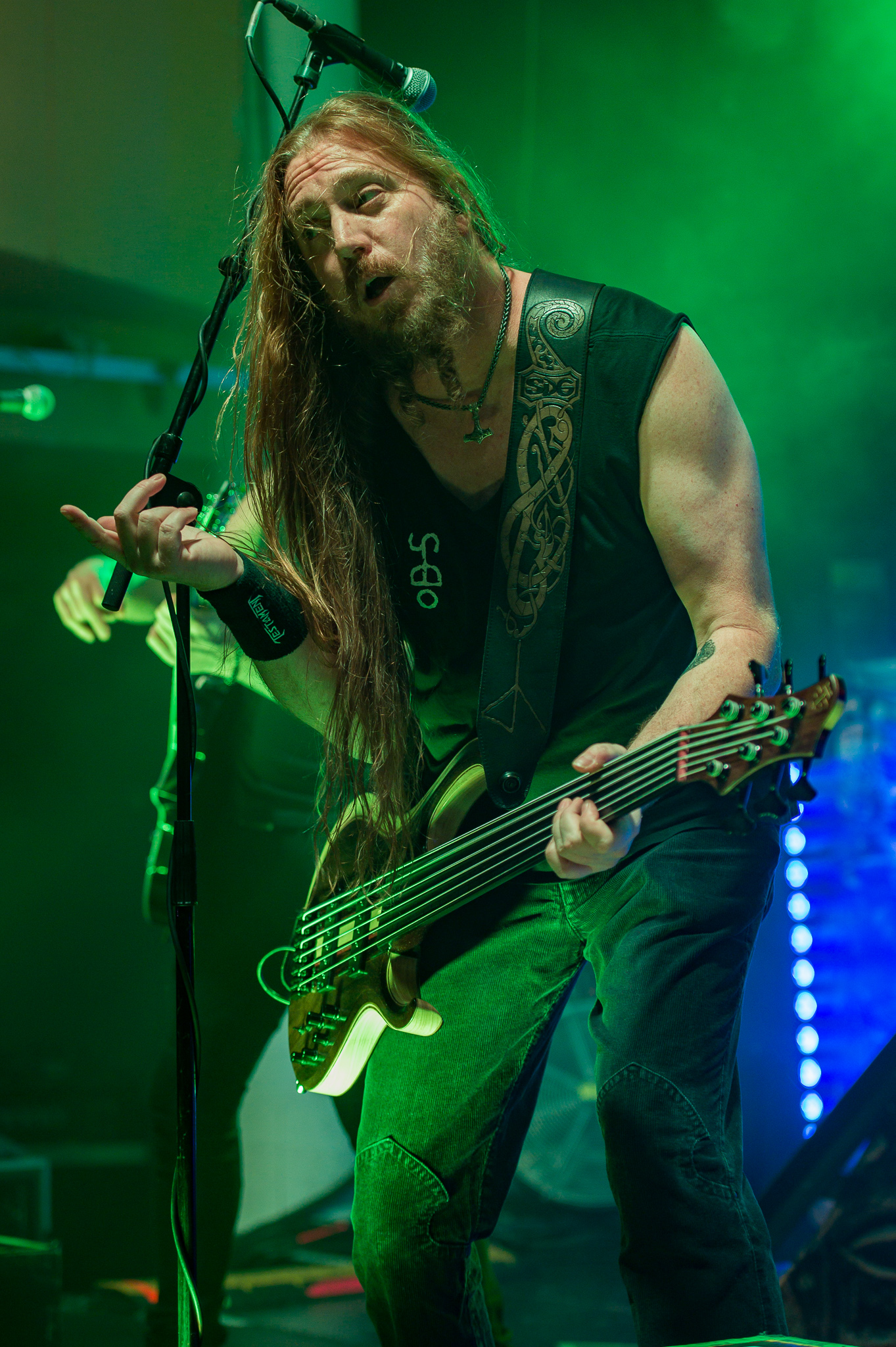
- Di Giorgio performing with Testament in 2017

Background information
- Born: November 7, 1967 (age 58); Waukegan, Illinois, U.S.
- Genres: Extreme metal; heavy metal
- Occupation: Musician
- Instrument: Bass guitar
- Years active: 1984–present
- Member of: Testament; Charred Walls of the Damned; Futures End; Spirits of Fire; Act of Denial
- Formerly of: Sadus; Death; Control Denied; Sebastian Bach; Dragonlord; Soen; Ephel Duath
- Website: stevedigiorgio.com

Steve Di Giorgio (born November 7, 1967) is an American bass guitarist. He is known for his work with numerous heavy metal bands such as Sadus (of which he was a co-founder), Death, Testament, Megadeth, Sebastian Bach, Iced Earth, Autopsy, Obituary, Control Denied, Dragonlord and Charred Walls of the Damned, and he has performed on over 50 albums as a guest, session or full-time band musician.

== Career ==
Di Giorgio has played bass guitar in heavy metal and death metal bands such as Death, Autopsy, Control Denied, Ephel Duath, Obscura, Artension, Faust, Memorain, Painmuseum, Suicide Shift, Soen, Vintersorg, Dragonlord, Iced Earth, Sebastian Bach, Obituary, Megadeth, and is a founding member of Sadus. He is a founding member of the jazz band Dark Hall and has played bass in other bands such as Testament, Futures End, Synesis Absorption, Mythodea, Charred Walls of the Damned, Anatomy of I, Gone in April, and Spirits of Fire. Along with his bass duties in Sadus, he also plays keyboards. In October 2019, he founded the fusion-world-metal group Quadvium with fellow fretless bass player Jeroen Paul Thesseling. A year later, he formed the death metal supergroup Act of Denial. In December 2025, he joined Obliveon as a session musician, taking over bass recording duties on their upcoming album.

== Musical style and influences ==
Within his genre, Di Giorgio is respected for his highly technical playing skills. He is also credited with being the first bassist to bring fretless bass playing into the heavy/extreme metal genre, and normally plays bass by using his fingers, although he has been seen using a pick on certain songs. Di Giorgio's influences include Geddy Lee, Chris Squire, Geezer Butler, Steve Harris, Stanley Clarke, Jaco Pastorius, Billy Sheehan, Dave Pegg and Charles Meeks. Di Giorgio explained the development of his playing style in 2017: "Working against what people consider comfortably normal, and swimming against the musical current from a young age has helped me stay out of the shadows as a bassist and as so many always still strive to keep it there. Fuck them."

== Personal life ==
Di Giorgio has been married for years, and is the father of a daughter who was born in April 1994. The family currently resides in Antioch, California.

== Equipment ==
Di Giorgio endorses Ibanez Guitars and primarily plays a number of different fretted and fretless BTB basses. He previously played two custom Mjolnir basses by Thor Bass; a custom made 5-string fretless model which he has converted to a 3-string and a custom-built 6 string fretless. He's also played custom ESP basses, mostly a F-series fretless 5-string bass in a dark green finish, but also uses a very unusual double-neck construction with a fretted and a fretless neck in one body. He currently uses an EBS Fafner head as his main sound, but has also used Ampeg and Randall in the past.

Di Giorgio's bass guitars

- 4001 Custom Rickenbacker (1981)
- Fully Custom Homemade Fender-Like Fretless (1991)
- 4001 Rickenbacker (1975)
- Custom Carvin BB75F (1996)
- Custom Carvin BB75 (1999)
- ESP – LTD F-205 (1999)
- ESP Custom Forest 5-string Fretless (1999)
- ESP Doubleneck Bass
- Thor Bass Mjolnir 5-string fretless (2008), since converted to be played with only 3 strings.
- Thor Bass Mjolnir 6-string Fretless (2010)
- Thor Bass Freyja 7-string Fretted (2013)
- 4003W Rickenbacker modified with a fretless ebony fretboard by Larry Davis (2014)
- Ibanez BTB1605E with a fretless neck (2016)
- Ibanez SDGB1 Steve DiGiorgio Signature Bass (2023)

== Discography ==
- Sadus – Illusions (1988)
- Autopsy – Severed Survival (1989, session)
- Sadus – Swallowed in Black (1990)
- Autopsy – Fiend for Blood (1991, session)
- Death – Human (1991)
- Sadus – A Vision of Misery (1992)
- Death – Individual Thought Patterns (1993)
- Sadus – Elements of Anger (1997)
- Testament – The Gathering (1999)
- Control Denied – The Fragile Art of Existence (1999)
- James Murphy – Feeding the Machine (1999)
- Testament – First Strike Still Deadly (2001)
- Dragonlord – Rapture (2001)
- Iced Earth – Horror Show (2001)
- Vintersorg – Visions from the Spiral Generator (2002)
- Artension – Future World (2004)
- Lunaris – Cyclic (2004, guest)
- Quo Vadis – Defiant Imagination (2004, session)
- Takayoshi Ohmura – Nowhere to Go (2004)
- Vintersorg – The Focusing Blur (2004)
- PainmuseuM – Metal for Life (2005)
- Various artists – Roadrunner United (2005)
- Rob van der Loo – Freak Neil inc. Characters (2005, guest)
- Sadus – Out for Blood (2006)
- Scariot – Momentum Shift (2007, session)
- Sebastian Bach – Angel Down (2007)
- Necro – Death Rap (2007)
- Roger Staffelbach's Angel of Eden – The End of Never (2007, session)
- Futures End – Memoirs of a Broken Man (2009)
- Faust – From Glory To Infinity (2009)
- Charred Walls of the Damned – Charred Walls of the Damned (2010)
- Heathen – The Evolution of Chaos (2010, guest)
- Christian Muenzner – Timewarp (2011, guest)
- Charred Walls of the Damned – Cold Winds on Timeless Days (2011)
- Johnny Newman – More than Ever (2011)
- Anatomy of I – Substratum (2011)
- Sylencer – A Lethal Dose of Truth (2012, guest)
- Synesis Absorption – Forever Untouched (2012)
- Ephel Duath – On Death And Cosmos (2012)
- Soen – Cognitive (2012)
- Memorain – Evolution (2012)
- Mythodea – Mythodea (2013)
- Artlantica – Across the Seven Seas (2013, session)
- Jeff Hughell – Chaos Labyrinth (2013, guest on track 3)
- Gone in April – Threads of Existence (2016)
- Testament – Brotherhood of the Snake (2016)
- Counter-World Experience – Pulsar (2016, guest on track 7)
- Art X - The Redemption of Cain (2016)
- Spirits of Fire – Spirits of Fire (2019)
- Geoda – Here and Now (2019)
- Testament – Titans of Creation (2020)
- Act of Denial – Negative (2021)
- Megadeth – The Sick, the Dying... and the Dead! (2022, session)
- Quadvium – Tetradōm (2025)
- Testament – Para Bellum (2025)
- Nuclear Messiah - Black Flame (2026, guest on tracks 2 and 5)

Preceded by David Ellefson	Megadeth bassist 2021	Succeeded by James LoMenzo
