= ICS Vortex =

Norwegian bassist and vocalist

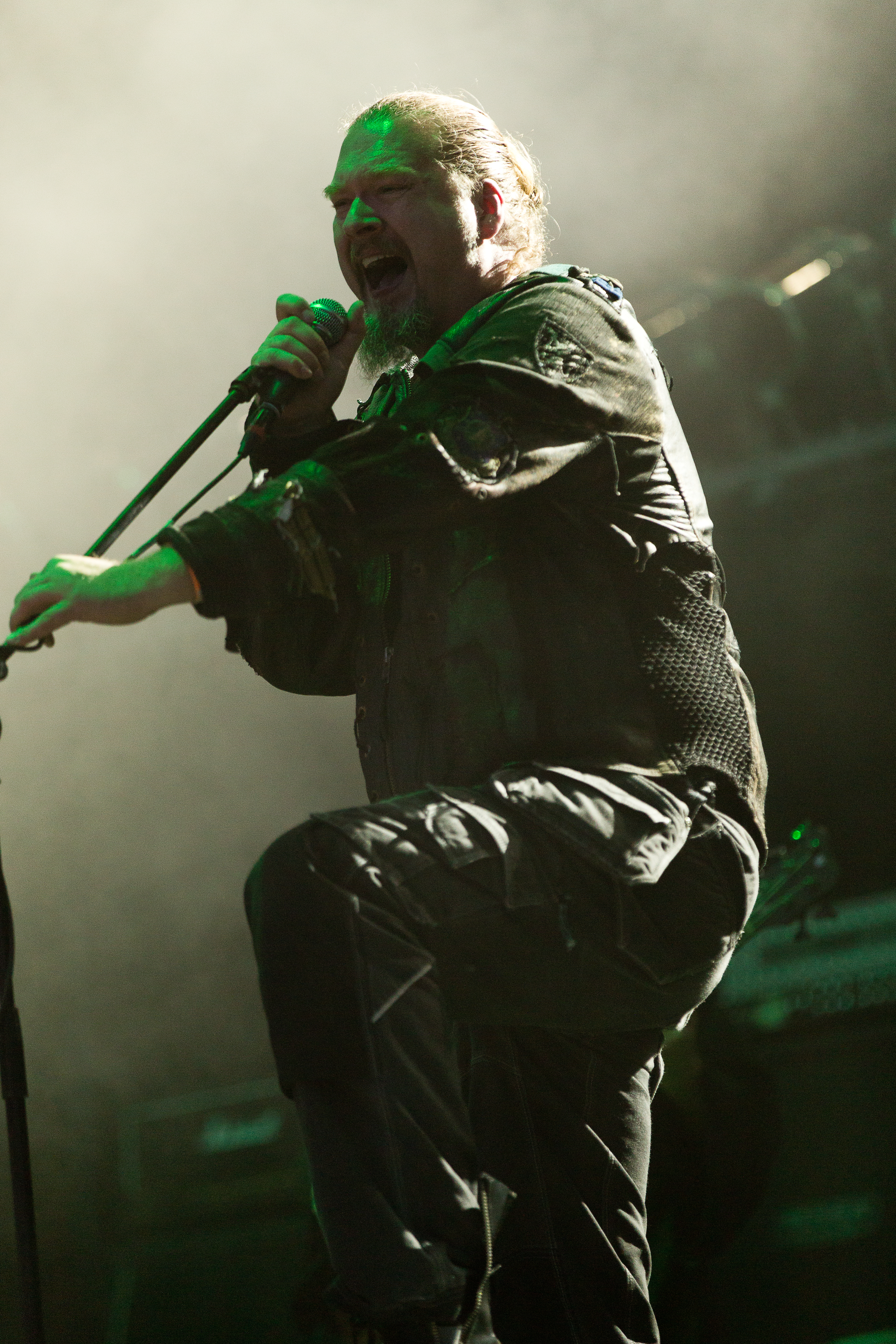
- ICS Vortex performing in 2016

Background information
- Born: Simen Hestnæs; 4 March 1974 (age 52); Oslo, Norway
- Genres: Symphonic black metal, doom metal, progressive metal, folk metal, avant-garde metal, black metal, Viking metal, progressive rock
- Occupation: Musician
- Instruments: Vocals, bass, guitar, keyboards
- Years active: 1991–present
- Label: Century Media
- Formerly of: Lamented Souls, Dimmu Borgir, Borknagar, Arcturus

Simen Hestnæs (born 4 March 1974), better known by his stage name ICS Vortex or simply Vortex, is a Norwegian musician. He is the vocalist of the similarly named band ICS Vortex, the avant-garde metal band Arcturus and the doom metal band Lamented Souls. He is also a vocalist and the bass guitarist to the progressive metal band Borknagar, and the former bass guitarist and clean vocalist for the symphonic black metal band Dimmu Borgir.

== Biography ==
Hestnæs stated in a March 2025 interview with Chaoszine that he grew up in Langhus, where he first took up drumming in his school's marching band and that the student directly in front of him in the drumline later became the original drummer for Mayhem.

His longest-running band is the doom metal band Lamented Souls, which began in 1991 and for which he plays guitar and handles the vocal duties. He actually started out as their drummer, but switched places with Ole Jørgen Moe when they became aware of his singing abilities. His moniker was a bit of a joke to poke fun at one of Garm's aliases, Fiery G. Maelstrom: "Icy S. Vortex", with the first words being opposite elements, the middle initial being the first letters of their common names, and the last word being a powerful circular current of water.

In 1995, he was on tour with the avant-garde metal band Ved Buens Ende and performed the supporting vocals. Songs from that tour were later released on ...Coiled in Obscurity bootleg album.

In 1997, Hestnæs made a guest appearance on the Arcturus album La Masquerade Infernale. He sang on three songs: "Master of Disguise", "The Chaos Path" (in which he handled all lead vocals, wrote the lyrics and co-composed this song), and "Painting My Horror".

In 1997, the folk/progressive/black metal band Borknagar was in need of a vocalist after the departure of original vocalist Garm. Garm introduced the band to Hestnæs, who became their vocalist from 1997 to 2000. He took over bass duties as well, recording bass for their fourth full-length Quintessence, after bass guitarist Kai K. Lie left the band.

In August 2000, Hestnæs left Borknagar to fully concentrate on Dimmu Borgir. According to an interview, Borknagar was set to tour Europe with Mayhem, about the same time he would be in the studio to record with Dimmu Borgir. Borknagar guitarist and frontman Øystein G. Brun gave Hestnæs an ultimatum: tour with Borknagar, or quit and deal with Dimmu Borgir. He opted for the latter, stating that he thought Dimmu Borgir would become a more successful band in the long term. Brun would later state that the decision was "business", and that he "had nothing against Dimmu Borgir", and he wished Hestnæs the best; Hestnæs then stated that had he not gotten the ultimatum, he would still be in Borknagar to this day.

Hestnæs first contributed on the recording of Spiritual Black Dimensions by adding a new vocal element: his own "clean" and "operatic" singing which added a new element to Dimmu Borgir as a band. Hestnæs stepped in as session bass guitarist when Nagash left the band to fully concentrate on The Kovenant; he was, until late August 2009, the permanent replacement on bass and a full member of Dimmu Borgir.

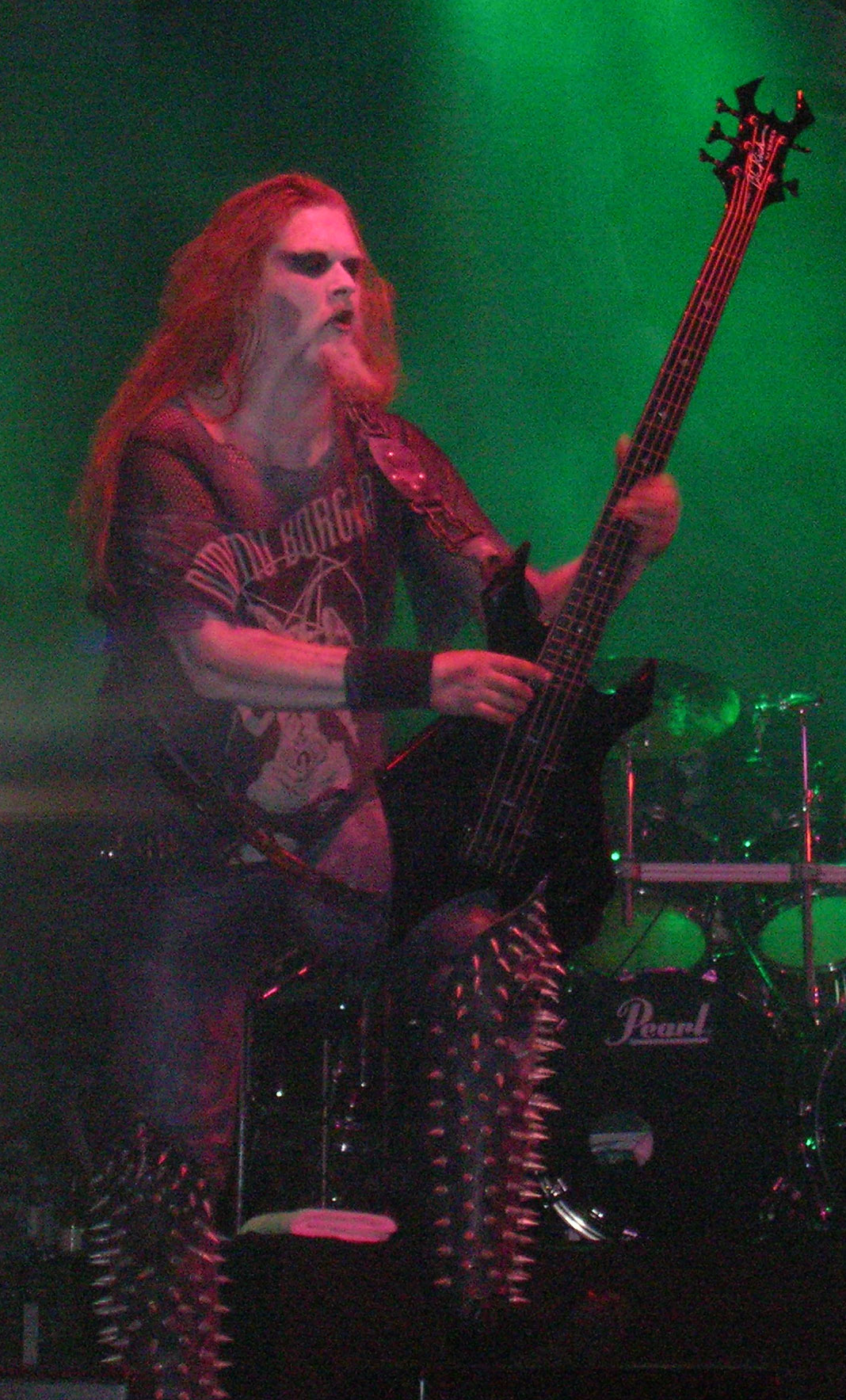
ICS Vortex in 2005

In 2005, Hestnæs became Arcturus' new singer following the departure of both Garm in 2003, and Spiral Architect's Øyvind Hægeland in 2005. Hægeland departed from the band due to the distance he lived from the other band members and Hestnæs took over as lead vocalist for the band, making it the second band in which Hestnæs would be the successor to Garm as vocalist. In September 2005, the band released their fourth full-length album, and first full-length without Garm on vocals, Sideshow Symphonies, which was met with varying acclaim. In 2005, Hestnæs was voted one of the top ten vocalists in Terrorizer Magazine and Arcturus was voted among the ten best live acts of 2005. Sideshow Symphonies was also ranked among the top ten albums of the year in the magazine.

In 2007, at a concert in Melbourne, Australia, Hestnæs stated that the concert would be Arcturus' last show. On 17 April, the band officially announced they had disbanded.

Most recently, Hestnæs lent his voice to the animated television program, Metalocalypse, in the episode "Dethdoubles" as well as "Dethwedding" and "Dethcarraldo".

According to a Myspace post (in late August 2009) by Mustis, the keyboardist of Dimmu Borgir, both he and Vortex had been fired from the band. Vortex later stated he will remember the days before the greed and music industry took over Dimmu Borgir.

In 2010, it was announced Hestnæs would be returning to Borknagar as a live member on bass and vocals. Furthermore, Arcturus would be resurrected to headline the ProgPower USA festival in 2011.

Hestnæs released his first solo album in 2011, entitled Storm Seeker. The album features Asgeir Mickelson on drums (ex-Borknagar), and some guitar solos by Terje "Cyrus" Andersen. The live band will include Borknagar guitarist Jens F. Ryland, and Steinar Gundersen from Spiral Architect on bass.

After several months of rumours of ICS Vortex's involvement with Borknagar, it was announced that he was to rejoin Borknagar full-time as a cooperative vocalist with Vintersorg (and Lars "Lazare" Nedland) as well as being the band's bass guitarist. This would last until Vintersorg's departure from the band in 2019, wherein Vortex assumed the role of lead vocalist once again for the first time since 2000. 2011 also saw the revival of Arcturus, with Vortex once again assuming lead vocal duties.

== Solo band members ==
- ICS Vortex – vocals, guitars (2011–present) (also bass and keyboards on 'Storm Seeker')
- Hallvard Eggestad – bass (2012–present)
- Baard Kolstad – drums (2012–present)
- Petter Hallaråker – guitars (2012–present)

Previous members

- Asgeir Mickelson – drums (on 'Storm Seeker')
- Cyrus – guitars (on 'Storm Seeker')
- Jens F. Ryland – guitars (2011–2012)
- Steinar Gundersen – bass (2011–2012)

== Discography ==
=== With Lamented Souls ===
1. Soulstorm (demo) (1992)
2. Demo '95 (demo) (1995)
3. Essence of Wounds (single) – Duplicate Records (2003)
4. The Origins of Misery – Duplicate Records (2004)
5. Echelons of Decay (tentative title) – Duplicate Records

=== With Ved Buens Ende ===
1. ...Coiled in Obscurity bootleg – Benighted Mirror Records (2002)

=== With Borknagar ===
1. The Archaic Course – Century Media Records (1998)
2. Quintessence – Century Media Records (2000)
3. Universal – Indie Recordings (2010) (guest on one song)
4. Urd – Century Media Records (2012)
5. Winter Thrice – Century Media Records (2016)
6. True North – Century Media Records (2019)
7. Fall – Century Media Records (2024)

=== With Dimmu Borgir ===
1. Spiritual Black Dimensions – Nuclear Blast (1999) (reissued in 2004) (guest)
2. Puritanical Euphoric Misanthropia – Nuclear Blast (2001)
3. Alive in Torment (EP) – Nuclear Blast (2001)
4. World Misanthropy (live EP) – Nuclear Blast (2002)
5. World Misanthropy (DVD/VHS) – Nuclear Blast (2002)
6. Death Cult Armageddon (EP) – Nuclear Blast (2003)
7. Death Cult Armageddon (DVD) – Nuclear Blast (2003)
8. Death Cult Armageddon – Nuclear Blast (2003)
9. Progenies of the Great Apocalypse (DVD) – Nuclear Blast (2003)
10. Vredesbyrd (single) – Nuclear Blast (2004)
11. The Sacrilegious Scorn (single) – Nuclear Blast (2007)
12. In Sorte Diaboli Sampler (single) – Nuclear Blast (2007)
13. The Serpentine Offering (single) – Nuclear Blast (2007)
14. In Sorte Diaboli – Nuclear Blast (2007)
15. The Invaluable Darkness (DVD) – Nuclear Blast (2008)

=== With Arcturus ===
1. La Masquerade Infernale – Misanthropy/Music for Nations (1997) (guest)
2. Sideshow Symphonies – Season of Mist (2005)
3. Shipwrecked in Oslo DVD – Season of Mist (2006)
4. Arcturian - Prophecy Productions (2015)

=== With Dagoba ===
1. What Hell Is About – Season of Mist (2006) (guest)

=== With Belzebubs ===
1. Pantheon of the Nightside Gods - Century Media (2019) (guest)

=== Solo ===
1. Storm Seeker – Century Media Records (2011)
