= Terra (Cronian album) =

Studio album by Cronian
- Released: Europe March 27, 2006; North America April 18, 2006
- Recorded: 2004–December 2005
- Genre: Progressive metal Avant-garde metal Black metal
- Length: 46:33
- Label: Century Media
- Producer: Cronian

Cronian chronology
Terra (2006)	Enterprise (2008)

Professional ratings
Review scores
Source	Rating
AllMusic	2.5/5 stars

Terra is the debut full-length album by Norwegian/Swedish progressive metal band Cronian. The album was sporadically recorded through 2004 and 2005, with the two members of the band separated by their countries most of the time. The album was released in Europe on March 27, 2006, and on April 18, 2006 in North America.

== Track listing ==
1. "Diode Earth" – 5:00 (Oystein G. Brun)
2. "Arctic Fever" – 5:42 (Brun, Andreas Hedlund)
3. "Cronian" – 5:18 (Brun, Hedlund)
4. "Iceolated" – 7:08 (Brun, Hedlund)
5. "Colures" – 3:12 (Hedlund)
6. "The Alp" – 6:04 (Brun, Hedlund)
7. "Nonexistence" – 5:06 (Brun)
8. "Illumine" – 7:13 (Brun)
9. "End(durance) -Part I" – 1:50 (Brun)

== Personnel ==
- Mr. V (Vintersorg, Borknagar, Waterclime, Fission) – vocals, bass, programming
- Øystein G. Brun (Borknagar) – guitars and programming

== Production ==
- Arranged, produced and engineered By Cronian
- Vocals engineered by Mattias Marklund
- Mixed by Mr. V (Andreas Hedlund)
- Mastered by Dan Swanö

== Notes ==
- Terra was mastered by musician and producer Dan Swanö, who is well known for his work with countless bands, particularly Edge of Sanity, Nightingale, and Bloodbath. The vocals were engineered by Mr. V's fellow Vintersorg band member Mattias Marklund. The photographs in the album booklet were also taken by Mattias.
