= Lars Nedland =

Norwegian musician (born 1976)

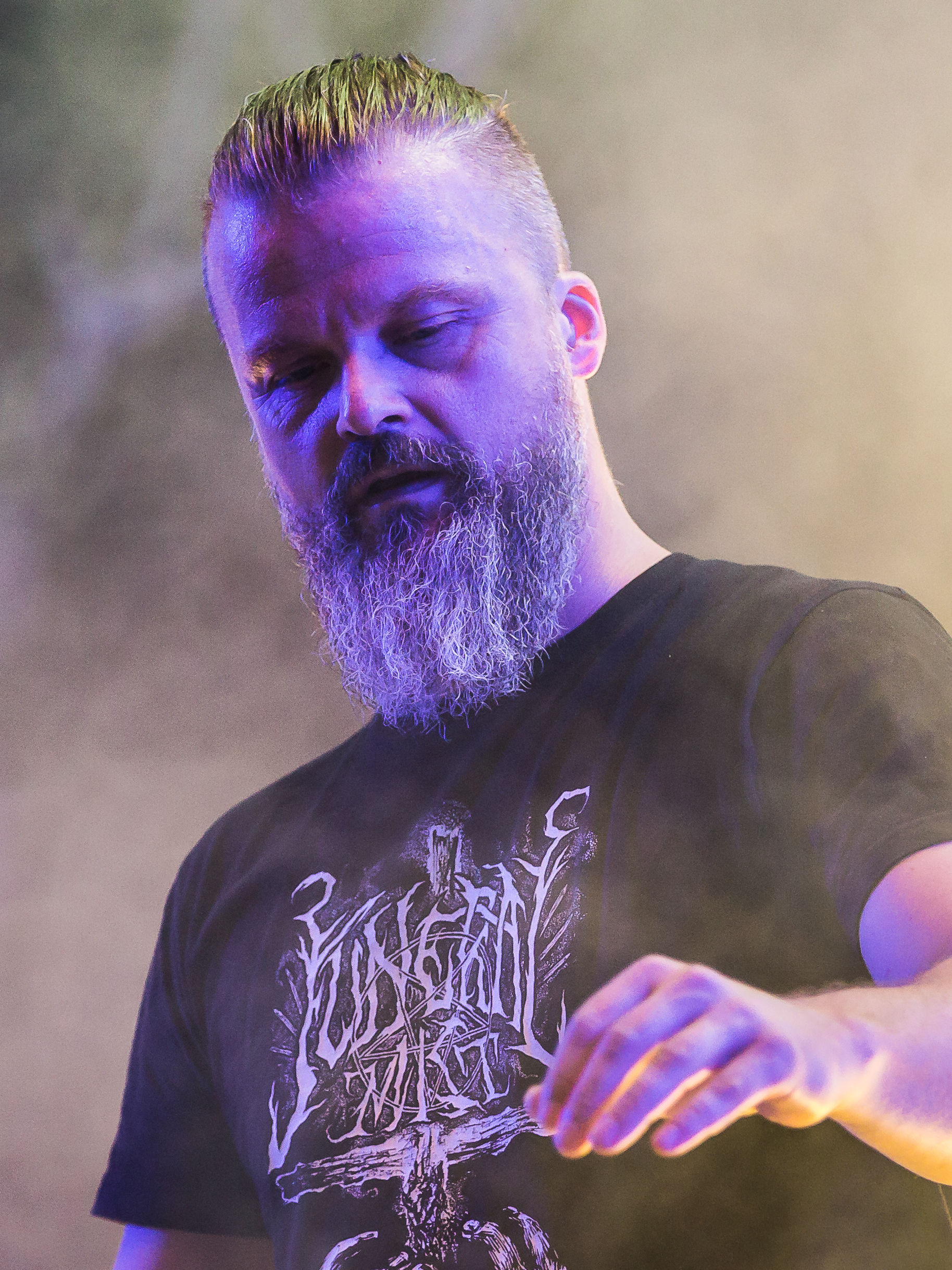
- Lazare performing in 2023

Background information
- Also known as: Lazare
- Born: Lars Are Nedland; 13 May 1976 (age 50)
- Genres: Black metal, avant-garde metal, progressive metal
- Occupation: Musician
- Instruments: Vocals, keyboards, drums, percussion
- Member of: Solefald, Borknagar, Age of Silence

Lars Are Nedland (born 13 May 1976), known also as Lazare, from Kristiansand, Norway, is the vocalist, drummer, and keyboardist for acclaimed avant-garde black metal band Solefald. He is also co-lead vocalist and keyboardist for the heavy metal act Borknagar. He composes much of the music and all the arrangements for violin and cello on the Solefald albums, Red for Fire: An Icelandic Odyssey Part 1 and Black For Death: An Icelandic Odyssey Part 2. He also has written some lyrics for the band, including the songs "04.34 pm", "Fluorescent", and "White Frost Queen." He and vocalist/guitarist/bassist/main lyricist Cornelius Jakhelln started Solefald in August 1995.

== Career ==
Over the years Lazare has joined a variety of bands, playing drums on the black metal band Carpathian Forest's 1998 album, Black Shining Leather, joining progressive metal band Borknagar to play piano, keyboard, synthesizer and Hammond organ, sing back-up vocals, and write lyrics, in 2000, and arranging sessions on drums for other bands (Böh, Grail, God.com)

In 2003 he joined folk/Viking metal band, Ásmegin, in which he sings all clean male vocals. In 2004, he was asked to join the avant-garde metal band Age of Silence as singer and main lyricist, which includes members such as Andy Winter from the band Winds, and Hellhammer from bands such as Arcturus, Mayhem, Winds.

Lazare is also a researcher/reporter/proprietor for the Norwegian television station TVNORGE, where he books guests, puts up cases, and goes out to report.

== Interviews ==
- Interview With Solefald
- Interview With Solefald 2

== Discography ==
=== With Solefald ===
- Jernlov (demo) (1996)
- The Linear Scaffold (1997)
- Neonism (1999)
- Pills Against The Ageless Ills (2001)
- In Harmonia Universali (2003)
- Red For Fire: An Icelandic Odyssey Part 1 (2005)
- Black For Death: An Icelandic Odyssey Part 2 (2006)
- The Circular Drain (2008)
- Norrøn Livskunst (2010)
- World Metal. Kosmopolis Sud (2015)

=== With Borknagar ===
- Quintessence (2000)
- Empiricism (2001)
- Epic (2004)
- Origin (2006)
- For the Elements (2008)
- Universal (2010)
- Urd (2012)
- Winter Thrice (2016)
- True North (2019)
- Fall (2024)

=== With Age of Silence ===
- Acceleration (2004)
- Complication - Trilogy of Intricacy (2005)

=== With Ásmegin ===
- Hin Vordende Sod & Sø (2003)

=== With Böh ===
- Böh (2001)

=== With White Void ===
- Anti (2021)

=== With Black Void ===
- Antithesis (2022)

=== With Ershetu ===
- Xibalba (2023)

=== As session musician/guest musician ===
- Carpathian Forest – Black Shining Leather (drums) (1998)
- Vintersorg – Visions From The Spiral Generator (Hammond organ) (2002)
- Vintersorg – The Focusing Blur (Hammond Organ, vocals/spoken word, lyrics) (2004)
- Sturmgeist – Meister Mephisto (backing-vocals) (2005)
- Winds – Prominence and Demise (vocals) (2007)
- Pantheon I – The Wanderer and His Shadow (vocals) (2007)
- Havoc Unit – h.IV+ (vocals) (2008)
- White Ward - Debemur Morti (vocals) (2021)
- Rotting Christ - Holy Mountain (vocals) (2022)
