= Origin (Borknagar album) =

Studio album by Borknagar
- Released: 30 October 2006
- Recorded: August 2005 – June 2006
- Studio: Toproom Studio, MultiMono Studio (Lunner, Norway), Auditorium Studio, Musikk & Mystikk, Low and Below Studio
- Genre: Progressive rock, folk rock, acoustic rock
- Length: 35:54
- Label: Century Media
- Producer: Borknagar

Borknagar chronology
Epic (2004)	Origin (2006)	Universal (2010)

Professional ratings
Review scores
Source	Rating
AllMusic	3/5 stars

Origin is the seventh studio album by Norwegian progressive metal band Borknagar. Origin explores the band's more traditional elements and is primarily an acoustic effort.

Bassist Jan Erik "Tyr" Tiwaz is featured on the album following his brief departure during the recording sessions for the band's previous release Epic.

The song "Oceans Rise" is an acoustic remake of the song of the same name from the 1998 album The Archaic Course.

== Track listing ==
All tracks are written by Øystein G. Brun, except "White", written by Lars Nedland.

No.	Title	Length
1.	"Earth Imagery"	4:52
2.	"Grains"	3:42
3.	"Oceans Rise"	6:05
4.	"Signs"	1:17
5.	"White"	4:45
6.	"Cynosure"	2:55
7.	"The Human Nature"	4:48
8.	"Acclimation"	4:30
9.	"The Spirit of Nature"	3:00
Total length:		35:54

== Credits ==
=== Borknagar ===
- Andreas Hedlund (credited as "Vintersorg") – lead vocals and choirs, electric guitar, keyboards
- Øystein G. Brun – acoustic, electric and high string guitar
- Lars A. Nedland – synthesizers, Hammond organ, grand piano, backing vocals, lead vocals (on "White"), string and flute arrangements
- Asgeir Mickelson – drums

=== Additional musicians ===
- Jan Erik Tiwaz (credited as "Tyr") – bass guitar, fretless bass
- Sareeta – violin
- Thomas Nilsson – cello
- Steinar Ofsdal – bamboo flutes, recorder

=== Additional personnel ===
- Christophe Szpajdel – logo
