= Epic (Borknagar album) =

Studio album by Borknagar
- Released: 29 June 2004
- Recorded: April 2003 – March 2004
- Studio: Toproom Studio (Lunner, Norway), Fagerborg Studio (Oslo, Norway), MultiMono Studio (Lunner, Norway)
- Genre: Progressive metal, black metal, folk metal
- Length: 57:55
- Label: Century Media
- Producer: Borknagar, Børge Finstad

Borknagar chronology
Empiricism (2001)	Epic (2004)	Origin (2006)

Professional ratings
Review scores
Source	Rating
AllMusic	4/5 stars

Epic is the sixth studio album by Norwegian progressive metal band Borknagar. It was released in 2004 on Century Media Records.

Bassist Jan Erik "Tyr" Tiwaz left the band during recording sessions for the album; all bass parts on the album were subsequently played by drummer Asgeir Mickelson. Mickelson and vocalist Andreas "Vintersorg" Hedlund also contribute additional guitar playing to compensate for the departure of former guitarist Jens F. Ryland.

== Track listing ==
No.	Title	Writer(s)	Length
1.	"Future Reminiscence"	Øystein G. Brun	5:26
2.	"Traveller"	Brun	5:03
3.	"Origin"	Brun, Vintersorg	4:58
4.	"Sealed Chambers of Electricity"	Brun, Nedland	4:12
5.	"The Weight of Wind"	Nedland	3:58
6.	"Resonance"	Brun, Vintersorg	4:28
7.	"Relate (Dialogue)"	Brun, Nedland	4:28
8.	"Cyclus"	Brun	5:25
9.	"Circled"	Brun, Nedland	4:45
10.	"The Inner Ocean Hypothesis"	Vintersorg	5:10
11.	"Quintessence"	Brun	5:31
12.	"The Wonder"	Brun	4:16
Total length:			57:55

== Personnel ==
=== Borknagar ===
- Andreas Hedlund (credited as "Vintersorg") – vocals, main guitar on "The Inner Ocean Hypothesis", guitar solo on "Quintessence"
- Øystein G. Brun – electric, acoustic and high-string guitar, additional guitar on "The Inner Ocean Hypothesis"
- Lars A. Nedland – synthesizer, Hammond organ, grand piano, backing vocals
- Asgeir Mickelson – drums, percussion, 5-string bass, fretless bass, guitars on "The Weight of Wind"

=== Production ===
- Borknagar – production, mixing
- Borge Finstad – production, mixing, engineer
- Morten Lund – mastering
- Christophe Szpajdel – logo
