= Fall (Borknagar album) =

Studio album by Borknagar
- Released: 23 February 2024
- Genre: Progressive metal; black metal; folk metal
- Length: 54:27
- Label: Century Media
- Producer: Øystein G. Brun

Borknagar chronology
True North (2019)	Fall (2024)

Singles from Fall
- 1. "Summits" Released: 15 December 2023; 2. "Nordic Anthem" Released: 16 January 2024; 3. "Moon" Released: 6 February 2024

Fall is the twelfth studio album by Norwegian progressive metal band Borknagar. It was released on 23 February 2024 through Century Media Records and was produced by Øystein G. Brun, the band's guitarist.

== Critical reception ==
Professional ratings
Review scores
Source	Rating
Blabbermouth.net	8.5/10
Distorted Sound	9/10
Ghost Cult	7/10

The album received generally positive reviews from critics. Dom Lawson from Blabbermouth.net gave the album 8.5 out of 10 and said: "An album that demands surrender and total engagement, Fall has the same commanding charisma that made previous high points like 2010's Universal and True North so nourishing and substantial. The difference this time is that Borknagar have transcended their established sound and grown, matured and passed through to a new realm of progged-out glory. Fans will relish every second, and newcomers will succumb too. The sound of greatness is overwhelming." Jack Press of Distorted Sound scored the album 9 out of 10 and called the album "masterful culmination of nearly three decades of work, a testament to the dedication of Brun and Borknagar at large to pushing black metal's envelopes beyond its cavernous boundaries." Ghost Cult gave the album 7 out of 10 and stated: "The vast array of sound and mood confirms why this veteran act is so highly regarded. The earnestness, depth, and guts of these songs captures their land's wonders and wilds. This album holds up to all their other exceptional work and proves Borknagar still has a lot to offer."

== Track listing ==
Fall track listing
No.	Title	Lyrics	Music	Length
1.	"Summits"	Øystein G. Brun, Lars Nedland	Brun	7:58
2.	"Nordic Anthem"	Nedland	Nedland	5:14
3.	"Afar"	Brun, Nedland	Brun	6:54
4.	"Moon"	ICS Vortex	Vortex	5:51
5.	"Stars Ablaze"	Brun, Nedland	Brun	8:26
6.	"Unraveling"	Nedland	Nedland	4:33
7.	"The Wild Lingers"	Brun, Nedland	Brun	5:34
8.	"Northward"	Nedland, Vortex, Brun	Brun	9:54
Total length:				54:27

== Personnel ==
Borknagar

- ICS Vortex (Simen Hestnæs) – bass, vocals, choirs
- Lazare (Lars A. Nedland) – keyboards, vocals, choirs
- Øystein G. Brun – guitars, production
- Jostein Thomassen – guitars
- Bjørn Dugstad Rønnow – drums, percussion

Additional personnel

- Jens Bogren – mixing
- Tony Lindgren – mastering

== Charts ==
Chart performance for Fall
Chart (2024)	Peak position
Austrian Albums (Ö3 Austria)	21
German Albums (Offizielle Top 100)	23
Swiss Albums (Schweizer Hitparade)	26
