= Cronian =

Metal band from Norway and Sweden

- Origin: Norway/Sweden
- Genres: Progressive metal
- Years active: 2004–present
- Labels: Century Media, Season of Mist
- Members: Øystein Brun; Andreas Hedlund

Cronian is a progressive metal band from Norway and Sweden founded in 2004 by Øystein Brun and Andreas Hedlund, also known as Vintersorg. The band's music is heavily symphonic and programmed, combining melodic singing and harsh vocals, all aiming to create a cold and cinematic feeling.

== History ==
Having known one another for years, Borknagar's main songwriter/guitarist Øystein Brun and Swedish musician Andreas Hedlund realized they had a similar idea for a band since 2000. Originally under the named "Ion", the two musicians began to collaborate, and in 2004 the band finally started gaining force. In 2005 the music of the band now known as Cronian was finalized and released, and in 2006 they released their first full-length album, entitled Terra. The album was mastered by famed musician and producer Dan Swanö, and released by Century Media Records as the first release in a three-record deal.

== Members ==
- Andreas Hedlund (a.k.a. Vintersorg) – vocals, bass, keyboard (2004–present)
- Øystein Brun – guitar, drum programming (2004–present)

== Discography ==
- Terra (Century Media, 2006)
- Enterprise (Indie Recordings, 2008)
- Erathems (2013)
