= Storm Seeker =

Storm Seeker may refer to:

- Storm Seeker (album), a 2011 studio album by ICS Vortex
- Storm Seeker (band), a German folk metal band
