= True North (Borknagar album) =

Studio album by Borknagar
- Released: 27 September 2019
- Recorded: December 2018 – March 2019
- Studio: Strand Studio (Oslo), Crosound Studio (Bergen), Mezzanine Studio
- Genre: Progressive metal, black metal, folk metal
- Length: 59:11
- Label: Century Media
- Producer: Borknagar

Borknagar chronology
Winter Thrice (2016)	True North (2019)	Fall (2024)

True North is the eleventh studio album by Norwegian progressive metal band Borknagar. It was released on 27 September 2019 by Century Media Records. It is their first album without Andreas Hedlund since Quintessence.

== Critical reception ==
Professional ratings
Review scores
Source	Rating
Metal Hammer Germany	6/7 stars
Rock Hard	8.5/10

Loudwire named it one of the 50 best metal albums of 2019.

== Track listing ==
No.	Title	Lyrics	Music	Length
1.	"Thunderous"	Lars Nedland, Øystein G. Brun	Brun	8:34
2.	"Up North"	ICS Vortex	ICS Vortex	6:29
3.	"The Fire That Burns"	Nedland, Brun	Brun	6:38
4.	"Lights"	Nedland	Nedland	5:04
5.	"Wild Father's Heart"	Nedland, Brun	Brun	5:42
6.	"Mount Rapture"	Nedland, Brun	Brun	6:08
7.	"Into the White"	Nedland	Nedland	5:57
8.	"Tidal"	Nedland, Brun	Brun	9:32
9.	"Voices"	Nedland	Nedland	5:07
Total length:				59:11

Limited edition digipak
No.	Title	Length
10.	"Wild Father's Heart" (instrumental demo)	6:25
11.	"Up North" (demo)	6:38
Total length:		72:14

== Personnel ==
Borknagar

- ICS Vortex – bass, vocals, choirs
- Lars "Lazare" Nedland – keyboards, vocals, choirs
- Øystein G. Brun – guitar, additional photography; mixing and mastering (tracks 10 and 11)
- Bjørn Dugstad Rønnow – drums, percussion
- Jostein Thomassen – guitar

Additional musicians

- John Ryan – violin and cello (tracks 1, 5, 9)

Production

- Jens Bogren – mixing (tracks 1–9), mastering
- Marius Strand – recording and engineering (drums)

Artwork

- Thor Erik Dullum – photography (cover art)
- Marcelo Vasco – layout, graphic design
- Christophe Szpajdel – logo

== Charts ==
Chart (2019)	Peak position
Finnish Albums (Suomen virallinen lista)	42
German Albums (Offizielle Top 100)	31
Swiss Albums (Schweizer Hitparade)	34
