= Andreas Hedlund =

Swedish musical artist

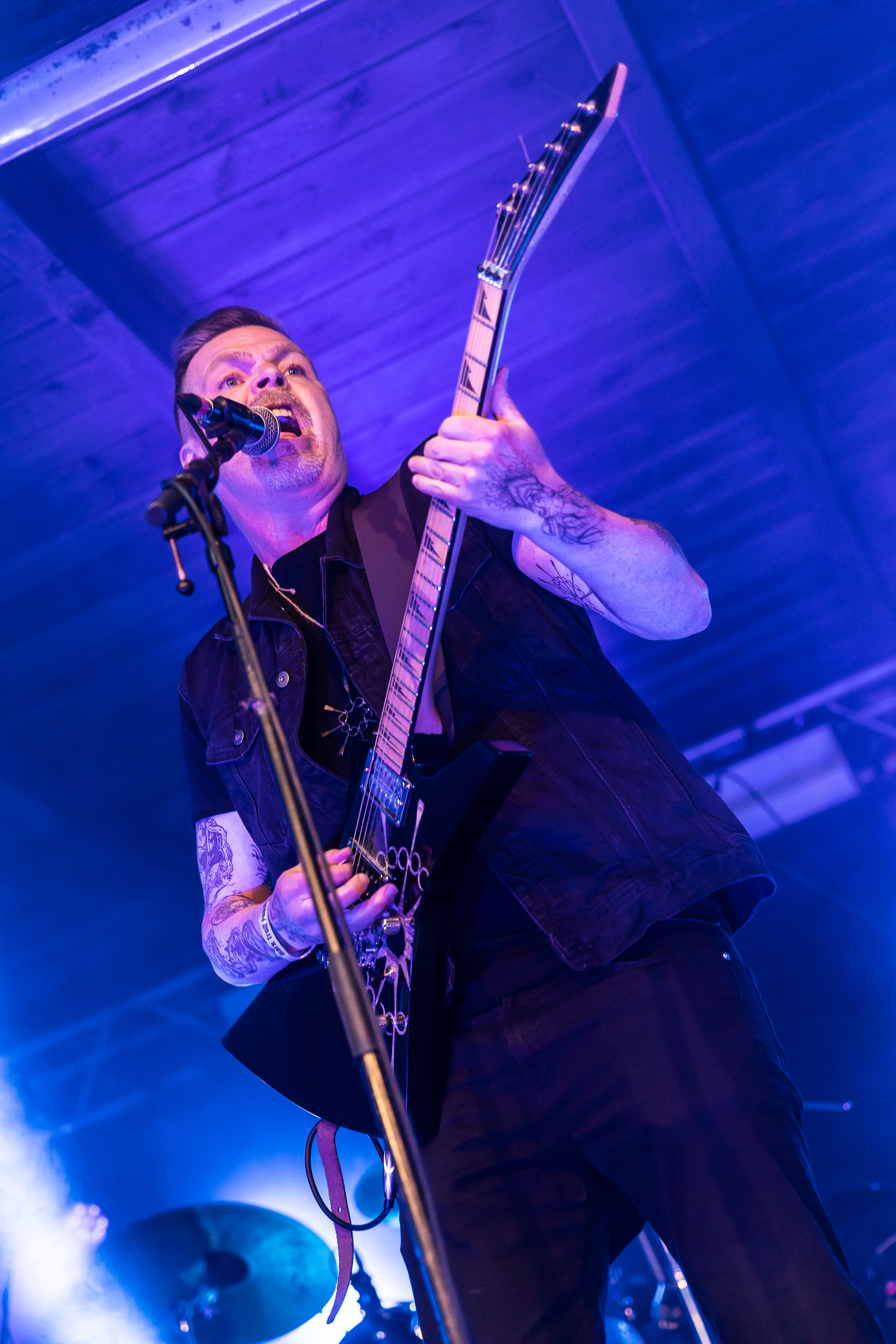
- Hedlund in 2025

Background information
- Also known as: Vintersorg, Mr. V
- Born: Andreas Hedlund; 11 September 1973 (age 52)
- Origin: Skellefteå, Sweden
- Genres: Black metal, folk metal, progressive metal, progressive rock, melodic death metal, death metal, thrash metal, avant-garde metal
- Occupations: Musician, songwriter, record producer, audio engineer
- Instruments: Vocals, guitar, bass, keyboards, lute, programming, piano, organ
- Years active: 1994–present
- Labels: Century Media, Lion Music, Napalm

Andreas Hedlund (born 11 September 1973), better known by his stage names Vintersorg and Mr. V, is a Swedish vocalist and multi-instrumentalist who has played in several heavy metal bands, including Borknagar, Cronian and Vintersorg.

== Biography ==
Hedlund's musical career came to be at or around 1991 when he was a member of a short-lived death metal project called "Masticator", which only lasted a single demo in the same year, yet his most notable musical exploit came in 1994 when he and a few other musicians formed "Vargatron" (Swedish for "Wolfthrone"). The original style was meant to be rooted in black metal but using mostly clean vocals and only a few moments of the traditional grim screaming. After a few line-up changes, the group broke up in 1996, but Hedlund still wanted to work with the songs he wrote for Vargatron and decided to record them by himself. As a result, he revived the act as a solo project and changed its name to "Vintersorg", a project he continues to this day.

In 1997, he took part in an obscure side project called "Cosmic Death," as vocalist, guitarist and keyboardist, playing a more traditional melodic black metal style than what he plays in his solo work. It only lasted a single year and recording before being shelved, yet was resurrected in 2006 without Hedlund.

As the year 2000 arose, so did a new project for Hedlund. This new band, Havayoth, was a gothic metal band formed by Marcus "Vargher" E. Norman from Ancient Wisdom, Bewitched, Naglfar, and Throne of Ahaz and Morgan Hansson, also from Naglfar. Hedlund sang on the 2000 album, His Creation Reversed, but left the band a few years later before he participated with them on anything else. The band continues on today without Hedlund.

=== Borknagar and Cronian ===
Following the departure of ICS Vortex as vocalist, Borknagar was in need of a new singer. Having been friends for some time, Øystein G. Brun asked Hedlund to take the reins for their forthcoming album, Empiricism. Hedlund joined the band in 2001 and he released a total of six albums with the bands, five with Century Media Records, and one with Indie Recordings.

Being long time friends, Øystein G. Brun and Hedlund eventually began to form a musical bond and found a mutual vision. They played with the idea of a band starting in 2000, but when Hedlund joined Borknagar the idea was put on hold for some time. Starting in 2005, the project finally returned though, originally called Ion, and now called Cronian, the band was their joint vision. Music that went beyond standard song structures to create a cinematic feel, while invoking images of grand and epic arctic landscapes was the goal, and the goal came into fruition on 27 March 2006 with the release of Terra, through Century Media Records.

While recording True North, Hedlund 'amicably' left Borknagar in 2019, due to health and work-related issues. However, he continued to collaborate with Brun on Cronian, which, as of October 2019, are expected to release a new album 'whenever time allows for that'.

=== Other projects ===
In 2002, Benny Hägglund, long time friend of Hedlund, and live drummer for Vintersorg, began working on music for a project that would combine melody and aggression into energetic songs. He eventually felt compelled to ask Hedlund for support in this project, thus Fission was born. With Benny playing drums, guitar, and bass, and Hedlund singing and adding his experimental edge to their melodic thrash metal with his unique synths, the band recorded their first full-length, entitled Crater, released in 2004 through Napalm Records.

In the autumn of 2004, Hedlund began writing music in his spare time. The difference though was this music was a reflection of a more personal, emotional side of his mind, and it came out in the form of progressive rock & symphonic rock rather than any of the genres of metal he had become known for. As he continued to write more, this project began to culminate into a full-fledged solo band, which he called Waterfield.

Eventually Hedlund had enough material for a full-length album, which was released through Lion Music on 20 January 2006 under the title The Astral Factor, under the band name Waterclime.

== Discography ==
=== With Otyg ===
- Älvefärd (1998)
- Sagovindars boning (1999)

=== With Vintersorg ===
- Hedniskhjärtad (EP) (1998)
- Till fjälls (1998)
- Ödemarkens son (1999)
- Cosmic Genesis (2000)
- Visions from the Spiral Generator (2002)
- The Focusing Blur (2004)
- Solens rötter (2007)
- Jordpuls (2011)
- Orkan (2012)
- Naturbål (2014)
- Till fjälls: Del II (2017)
- Vattenkrafternas spel (2025)

=== With Havayoth ===
- His Creation Reversed (2000)

=== With Borknagar ===
- Empiricism (2001)
- Epic (2004)
- Origin (2006)
- Universal (2010)
- Urd (2012)
- Winter Thrice (2016)

=== With Fission ===
- Crater (2004)
- Pain Parade (2008)

=== With Waterclime ===
- The Astral Factor (2006)
- Imaginative (2007)

=== With Cronian ===
- Terra (2006)
- Enterprise (2008)
- Erathems (2013)
