= Dagoba (band) =

French heavy metal band

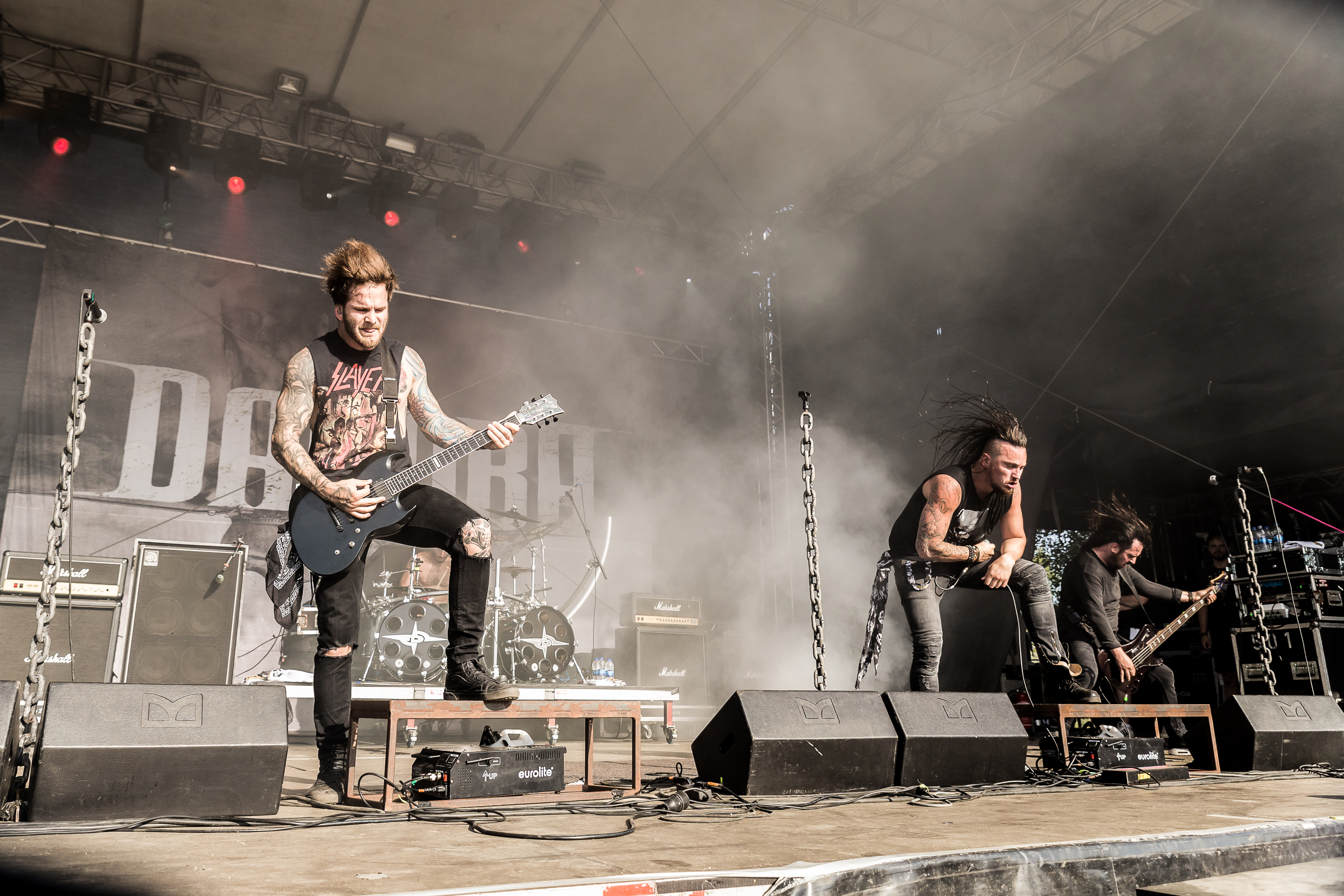
- Dagoba performing at With Full Force 2018

Background information
- Origin: Marseille, France
- Genres: Groove metal, industrial metal
- Years active: 1997–present
- Labels: Enternote, EMI France, Season of Mist, XIII Bis, Verycords, Century Media
- Members: Shawter; Kawa Koshigero; Richard De Mello (Ritch DM); Theo
- Past members: Stephan; Izakar; Yves Terzibachian; Franky Coztanza; JL Ducroiset

Dagoba is a French groove metal band formed in Marseille in 1997. They have released eight studio albums.

== History ==
The band chose the name as a nod to Dagobah, the fictional, swamp-covered planet from the sci-fi saga Star Wars. Following many line-up changes, Franky Costanza joined the band in mid-1998, while Werther, Izakar, and Stephan joined the band in 1999.

In 2001, Dagoba signed on Enternote Records and recorded its first EP, Release the Fury, in digipak format and accompanied by a video for "Rush". Distributed by Edel/Sony, Release the Fury received positive reviews.

In March 2003, Dagoba released their first self-titled album. The band's sound had changed since Release the Fury. After Stephan left the band, Dagoba continued to play as a quartet and gave distribution rights to EMI. They followed up the album release with a successful European tour. The tour included opening for acts such as Samael and a headlining stint throughout France.

In February 2006, after two years, Dagoba released What Hell Is About, produced by Tue Madsen. Very different from the last album, What Hell Is About was more somber, with a more gothic sound. Simen Hestnæs formerly of Dimmu Borgir, Borknagar, and Arcturus performed guest vocals on two songs. After the release of the album, Dagoba went on tour in Europe, opening for the likes of Machine Head, Metallica and completed a continental tour with In Flames and Sepultura. They also attended Summerbreeze 2007 and With Full Force 2007.

Dagoba's third album, Face the Colossus, also produced by Tue Madsen, was released on 29 September 2008 via Season of Mist. Dagoba's fourth album, Poseidon, was released 30 August 2010. Dagoba's fifth album, Post Mortem Nihil Est was released on 27 May 2013. Dagoba's sixth album, Tales of the Black Dawn, was released on 16 June 2015.

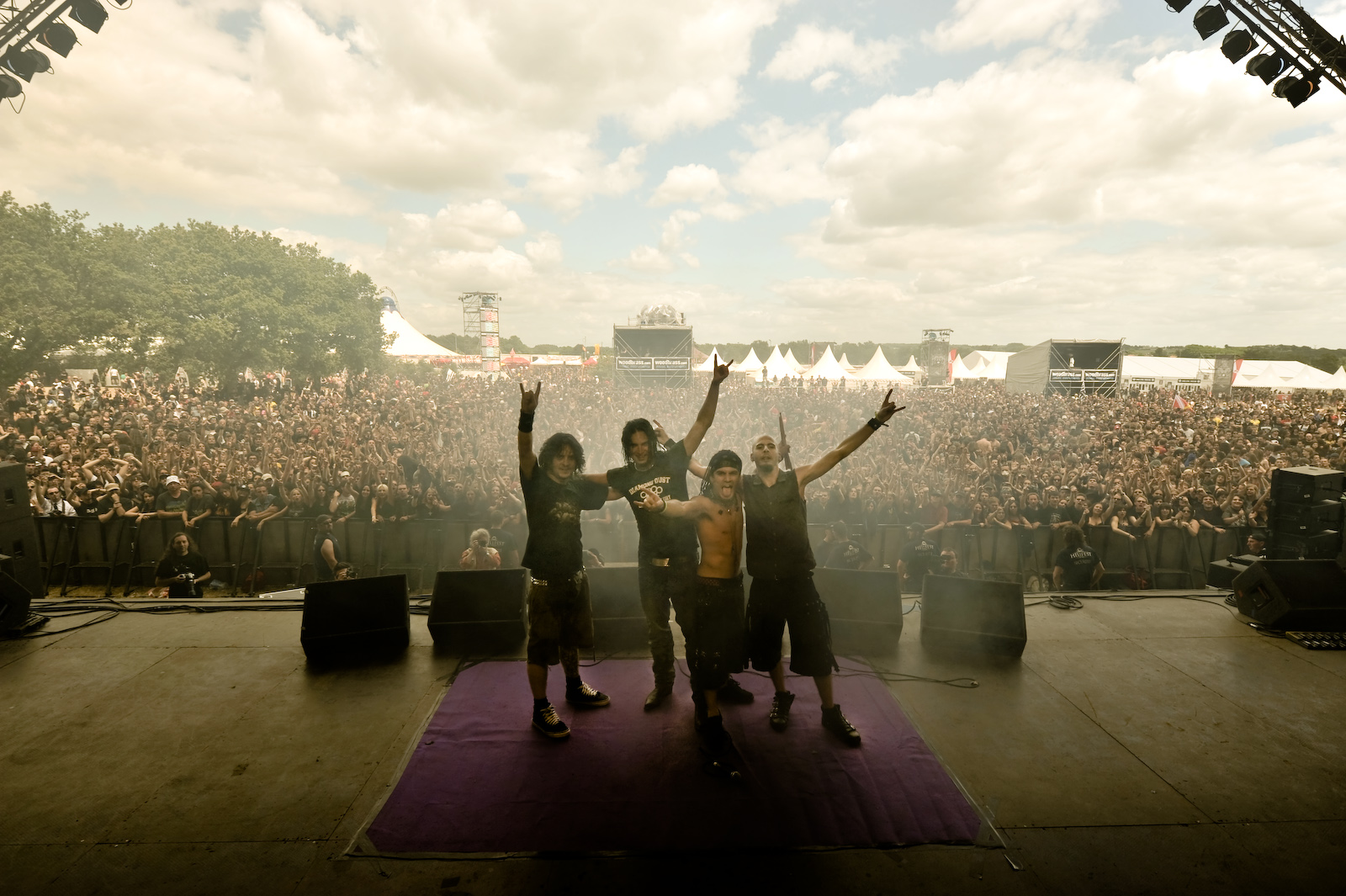
Dagoba at Hellfest 2009

Dagoba's seventh album, Black Nova, was released on 25 August 2017. It was produced by Jacob Hansen (Epica, Volbeat, etc.) in Denmark. The band signed with Century Media Records for a worldwide distribution of the album released on Sony Music/Epic Jive. The band followed up the release with their first Japan tour. They were also part of the European tour with Kreator and Vader in January 2018.

Dagoba's eighth studio album, and their first in five years, By Night, was released on 18 February 2022.

=== Izakar's departure ===
On 23 July 2012, Izakar, the band's lead guitarist, announced via Facebook, that he was leaving the band due to "Irreconcilable differences with one of the band members" and that he was now mainly focusing on his side projects Blazing War Machine and the Full Metal Studio. Though he would not disclose who in particular prompted his decision, he stated that he "wishes Dagoba all the best" and thanked them for the years they have played together.

=== Franky Costanza and Z's departure ===
On 25 May 2016 it was announced that drummer Franky Constanza and guitarist Z were both leaving the band. Nicolas Bastos (L'Esprit du Clan, Deep In Hate) was announced as the new drummer, and Jean-Laurent Ducroiset of Xplore Yesterday was announced as the new guitarist.

=== JL Ducroiset's departure ===
On 21 December 2017, Dagoba announced that they parted ways with guitarist JL Ducroiset. Richard De Mello (a.k.a. Ritch DM), the current guitarist in the black metal act, Deluge was announced as the new guitarist.

The Things Within
"The Things Within" by Dagoba from the album What Hell Is About.

== Band members ==
Current

- Pierre "Shawter" Maille – lead vocals, sampling (1997–present)
- Richard De Mello - guitar, backing vocals (2017-present)
- Theo Gendron – drums (2021-present)
- Kawa Koshigero — bass (2021-present)

Former

- Franky Costanza – drums (1998–2016)
- S.T. – guitar (1999–2002)
- Jean-Pierre "Izakar" Isnard – guitar, backing vocals (1999–2012)
- Werther Ytier – bass, backing vocals (1999–2021)
- Yves "Z" Terzibachian – guitar, backing vocals (2012–2016)
- Jean-Laurent "JL" Ducroiset – guitar, backing vocals (2016–2017)
- Nicolas Bastos - drums (2016-2021)

Timeline

== Discography ==
Studio albums

- Dagoba (2003)
- What Hell Is About (2006)
- Face the Colossus (2008)
- Poseidon (2010)
- Post Mortem Nihil Est (2013)
- Tales of the Black Dawn (2015)
- Black Nova (2017)
- By Night (2022)
- Different Breed (2024)

Other releases

- Time 2 Go (1999) demo
- Two Men Later (1999) demo
- Release the Fury (2001) EP
- Hellfest MMXIV (2014) live album

== Videography ==
- "Rush"
- "Another Day"
- "The Things Within"
- "Black Smokers (752° Fahrenheit)"
- "The Great Wonder"
- "Yes, We Die"
- "The Sunset Curse"
- "Born Twice"
- "Inner Sun"
- "Stone Ocean"
