= The Wanderer and His Shadow (album) =

Studio album by Pantheon I
- Released: May 22, 2007
- Recorded: Nye Losjen Studios
- Genre: Black metal
- Length: 42:19
- Label: Candlelight Records
- Producer: Christian Wibe

Pantheon I chronology
Atrocity Devine (2006)	The Wanderer and His Shadow (2007)	Worlds I Create (2009)

Professional ratings
Review scores
Source	Rating
Lords Of Metal	link

The Wanderer and His Shadow is the second full-length album from Norwegian extreme metal band, Pantheon I and was released in May 2007.

The name of the album comes from one of Friedrich Nietzsche's earlier works of the same name.

== Track listing ==
1. "Origin of Sin" – 4:47
2. "The Wanderer and His Shadow" – 4:54
3. "Cyanide Storm" – 5:03
4. "Coming to an End" – 6:27
5. "Shedim"– 4:25
6. "Where Angels Burn" – 5:16
7. "My Curse" – 8:13
8. "Chaos Incarnate" – 3:13

== Credits ==
- Andrè Kvebek – vocals, guitar
- John Espen Sagstad – guitar
- Mads Guldbekkhei – drums
- Tor Risdal Stavenes – bass
- Live Julianne Kostøl – cello
- Guest appearances on Coming to an End by Solefald vocalist Lazare Nedland and Nachtgarm from Negator on Chaos Incarnate.
- Violin on Where Angels Burn by former Pantheon I member Gunhild.
- Cover art by Kjell Åge Meland, who did the front cover to Atrocity Divine.

== Sources ==
- Metal Archives
- Pantheon I official website
