= Futility Report =

Studio album by White Ward
- Released: 12 May 2017
- Genre: Post-black metal
- Length: 40:26
- Label: Debemur Morti Productions

White Ward chronology
Futility Report (2017)	Love Exchange Failure (2019)

Futility Report is the debut studio album by the Ukrainian black metal band White Ward, released on 12 May 2017 via the French label Debemur Morti Productions. It was the only album to feature of Andrew Rodin on vocals, Ihor Palamarchuk on guitars, Yurii Kononov on drums and Alexey Iskimzhi on saxophone.

At the time of its recording, the band members were located in different cities - Odesa, Kherson and Cherkasy. Work on Futility Report lasted three years. The album was noticed and highly appreciated both in Ukraine and abroad, and the band acquired new fans and maintained communication with them through social networks. The band's bass guitarist, Andrii Pechatkin, shared a story related to the album in his interview with karabas.live. He stated that "a guy named Colin wrote to us from the USA. For several days, doctors tried to induce an epileptic seizure in him, and our music helped him not to go crazy. The guy was forbidden to sleep, so he lay down and listened to Futility Report for several hours straight."

Editors of thematic online publications noted the successful and unusual combination of black metal with jazz, the high level of performance and the quality of the recording.

Professional ratings
Review scores
Source	Rating
Metal Injection	9.5/10 stars
Metal.de	7/10 stars
Metal1.info	8.5/10 stars
Sputnikmusic	4/5 stars

== Track listing ==
All lyrics are written by Alexey Sidorenko; all music is composed by White Ward, Vladimir Bauer and Alexander Smirnov.

No.	Title	Length
1.	"Deviant Shapes"	7:22
2.	"Stillborn Knowledge"	8:06
3.	"Homecoming"	6:33
4.	"Rain as Cure"	3:13
5.	"Black Silent Piers"	6:34
6.	"Futility Report"	8:38
Total length:		40:26

== Personnel ==
- Andrii Pechatkin — bass guitar
- Ihor Palamarchuk — guitars
- Yurii Kononov — drums
- Yurii Kazaryan — guitars
- Andrew Rodin — vocals
- Alexey Iskimzhi — saxophone
