= Bewitched (Swedish band) =

Swedish metal band

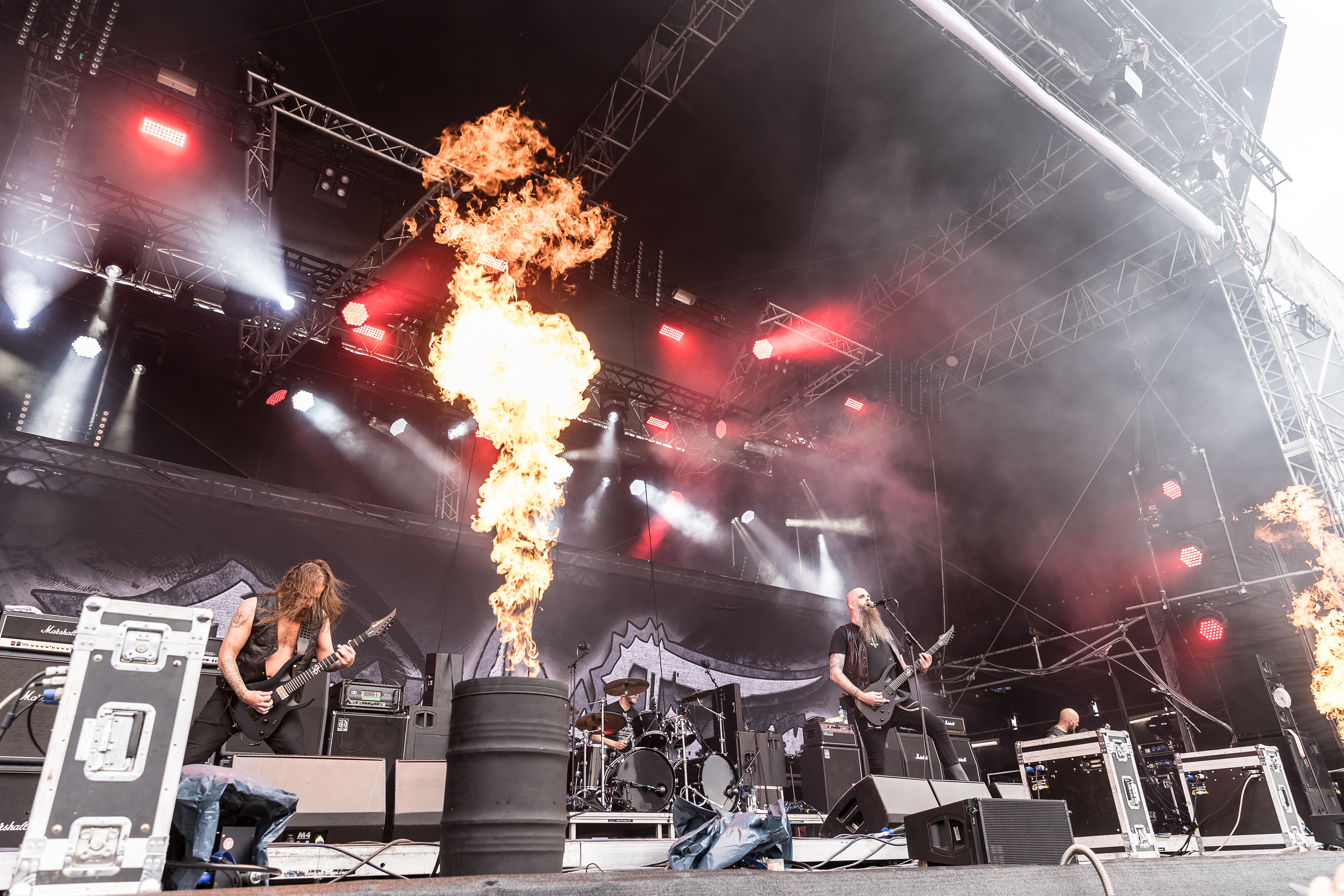
Bewitched at Party.San Metal Open Air 2024.

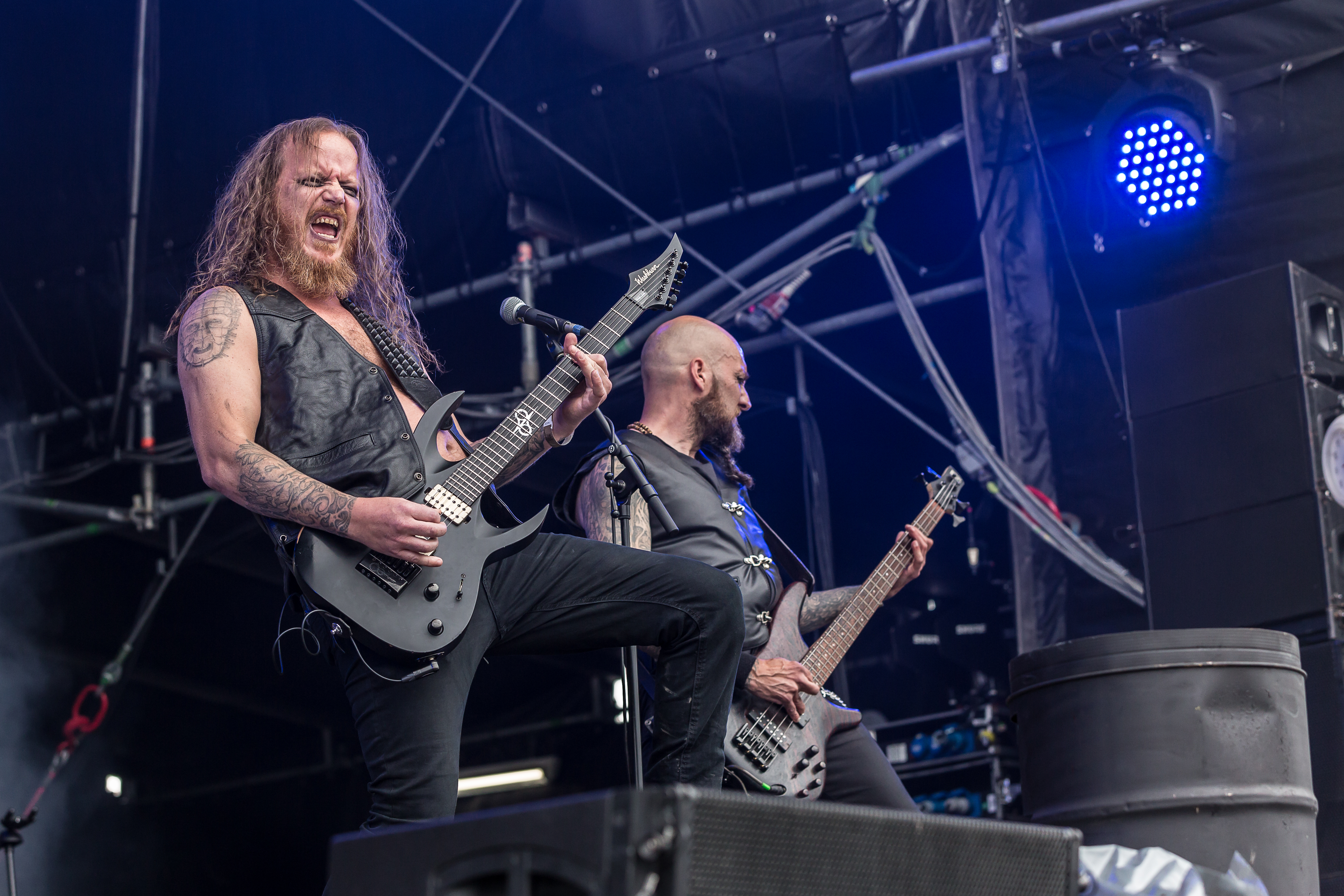
Bewitched at Party.San Metal Open Air 2024.

Bewitched is a Swedish thrash/black metal band. They released four studio albums and a live album on Osmose Productions and one studio album on Regain Records.

Founded in 1995 in Umeå, Bewitched employed corpse paint while playing "a retro style of thrash metal that was popular in the early to mid-'80s", bordering on the style of Venom. The band signed with Osmose Productions and started releasing material there, as well as touring and releasing their first live album already in 1998. Founding guitarist Blackheim quit to focus on Katatonia. Marcus E. Norman also ran the project Ancient Wisdom.

== Discography ==
- Diabolical Desecration (1996, Osmose Productions)
- Encyclopedia of Evil (EP, 1996, Osmose Productions)
- Pentagram Prayer (1997, Osmose Productions)
- Hell Comes to Essen (live album, 1998, Osmose Productions)
- At the Gates of Hell (1999, Osmose Productions)
- Rise of the Antichrist (2002, Osmose Productions)
- Atrocities in A-Minor (EP, 2004, Regain Records)
- Spiritual Warfare (2006, Regain Records)
