= Enslavement of Beauty =

Norwegian black metal band

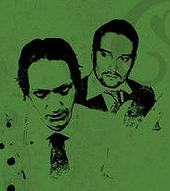

Background information
- Origin: Oslo, Norway
- Genres: Melodic black metal, symphonic black metal
- Years active: 1995–2016 (on hiatus)
- Label: I.N.R.I. Unlimited
- Members: Ole Alexander Myrholt; Tony Eugene Tunheim
- Past members: Asgeir Mickelson; Hans-Åge Holmen; Julie Johnsen; Fred Endresen

Enslavement of Beauty is a Norwegian melodic/symphonic black metal band from Mosjøen. It was formed in January 1995 by Ole Alexander Myrholt (vocals & lyrics) and Tony Eugene Tunheim (guitars & composing). The band spent years composing and recording material and developing their style. In the summer of 1998, Enslavement of Beauty recorded the demo CD Devilry & Temptation. They signed with Head Not Found/Voices of Wonder. This resulted in the 1999 release Traces O' Red, which received a positive response. In November 2000, they recorded their second album, Megalomania, with drummer Asgeir Mickelson (Borknagar/Spiral Architect) and bass player Hans-Aage Holmen. In 2007, the third album, Mere Contemplations, was released on I.N.R.I. Unlimited. Lyrically, Enslavement of Beauty is influenced by William Shakespeare and the Marquis de Sade.

== Discography ==
- Devilry and Temptation (demo, 1998)
- Traces o' Red (studio album, Head Not Found, 1999)
- Megalomania (studio album, Head Not Found, 2001)
- Mere Contemplations (studio album, INRI Recordings, 2007)
- The Perdition EP (2009)
- And Still We Wither (compilation, 2018)
