= Urd (album) =

Studio album by Borknagar
- Released: 26 March 2012
- Recorded: June–July, October–November 2011
- Studios: TopRoom Studios (Lunner, Norway), Silver Soundscapes, Mezzanine Studio, Waves Studio
- Genres: Progressive metal, black metal, folk metal
- Length: 53:01
- Label: Century Media
- Producer: Borknagar

Borknagar chronology
Universal (2010)	Urd (2012)	Winter Thrice (2016)

Professional ratings
Review scores
Source	Rating
About.com	4/5 stars
Chronicles of Chaos	8/10
Lambgoat	7/10 stars
Thrash Hits	5/6 stars

Urd is the ninth studio album by Norwegian progressive metal band Borknagar. Released on 26 March 2012, it is the first album to feature Simen "ICS Vortex" Hestnæs and Andreas "Vintersorg" Hedlund sharing lead vocals. It is also the final album with drummer David Kinkade, who joined Soulfly after recording sessions were completed and subsequently retired from music.

== Background ==
Borknagar's founder, Øystein G. Brun, described the artwork for Urd as "an earthly expression...You can almost smell and feel the texture of the old Norse wooden carvings". Given that Borknagar's previous album was titled Universal, Brun suggested that it was natural for the band to "head back home to earth" when choosing the title for its next album. For Brun, this choice reflected a desire to "get back to the core of the band", and specifically "admiration and pondering about nature and mankind's place therein".

For Brun, the meaning behind the album title connects with the sound of the album: "Even though the album has a very progressive approach, the spirit of the album is very retrospective. Might sound a bit like a paradox, but in my opinion this 'duality' is the very core of progression. Progression without a musical anchor is plain drifting. But [there] is more to the title, different layers of philosophical ideas and perspectives."

Among the different layers of the album title is its connection to Norse mythology. Urd, which is the name of a norn that represents the past when deciding the fates of persons. This entity is taken by Brun as a metaphor for a modern scientific discovery. Brun speculated that Urd "is an ancient expression of what we today know as DNA. And I have always been very fascinated by the fact that parts and bits of our DNA actually derive from the very beginning of time. All living creatures are somewhat connected to the very first organic cell. That is some of the story behind the album title".

Elaborating upon the interconnectedness of organisms through time, Brun has alluded to the deep ecology of Arne Næss as an inspiration on Urd. "I just love how he [Naess] talks about nature, almost like in a childish but yet a very profound way. He professes the idea that every creature is connected and equally independent for survival. Some sort of revolt against the Christian dogma that mankind is the ruler of the earth. So based on this, I was inspired to turn my head down to earth to ponder about the 'roots' of mankind".

== Track listing ==
All tracks are written by Øystein G. Brun, except for where noted.

No.	Title	Length
1.	"Epochalypse" (Brun, Vintersorg)	6:08
2.	"Roots" (Brun, ICS Vortex)	5:55
3.	"The Beauty of Dead Cities" (Lars A. Nedland)	4:15
4.	"The Earthling"	6:51
5.	"The Plains of Memories" (instrumental)	4:27
6.	"Mount Regency"	6:08
7.	"Frostrite" (ICS Vortex)	4:50
8.	"The Winter Eclipse"	8:45
9.	"In a Deeper World"	5:42
Total length:		53:01

The limited edition digipack contains two bonus tracks:
No.	Title	Length
10.	"Age of Creation" (Brun, Vintersorg)	6:19
11.	"My Friend of Misery (Metallica cover)" (James Hetfield, Jason Newsted, Lars Ulrich(On UK & Europe Edition))	6:16

== Personnel ==
=== Borknagar ===
- Andreas Hedlund (credited as "Vintersorg") – clean vocals, harsh vocals, choirs
- Øystein G. Brun – clean and electric guitar
- Jens F. Ryland – lead guitar
- Simen Hestnæs (credited as "ICS Vortex") – bass, clean vocals, choirs
- Lars A. Nedland – keyboards, clean vocals, choirs
- David Kinkade – drums, percussion

=== Additional personnel ===
- Christophe Szpajdel – logo
