= Universal (Borknagar album) =

Studio album by Borknagar
- Released: 22 February 2010
- Recorded: January–April 2009
- Studio: Toproom Studio (Lunner, Norway), Waves Studio, Mezzanine Studio
- Genre: Progressive metal, black metal, folk metal
- Length: 46:54
- Label: Indie
- Producer: Borknagar

Borknagar chronology
Origin (2006)	Universal (2010)	Urd (2012)

Universal is the eighth studio album by Norwegian progressive metal band Borknagar. It marks the return of guitarist Jens F. Ryland. The band's former vocalist Simen "ICS Vortex" Hestnæs performs vocals on the track "My Domain". The album was intended to be released in the fall of 2009, but the release date was postponed as a result of a label decision. It was released on 22 February 2010 in four formats: a regular jewelcase CD, a limited digipack which includes a bonus disc, a CD box with extras, and a gatefold LP with double vinyl.

== Background ==
Regarding the album, founding member Øystein G. Brun said: "We are extremely satisfied with the result! The album turned out even better than we dared to hope for when starting this journey. There is an attitude, energy and nerve to this record that will appeal to the most primal side of man, yet there is complexity and atmosphere that will challenge the most sophisticated parts of mind. The album contains all the elements that made Borknagar the band we are and we are firmly believe [sic] that this album will be a huge piece of candy for those who have followed the band through the years. This is by far the most complete album we have done to date- musically and production wise- and we are right now just immensely eager to get the album out there!"

According to Brun, the album's title "shines through and mirrors the essence of the album. Universal is a title that is broad enough and huge enough to project the giant character of this album, both musically and lyrically."

Lars A. Nedland expressed his opinion on the album: "I just listened to the test mastering of two of the new songs, and they sound great. I'm absolutely confident that you will love this album. Both Mr. V and Vortex do such amazing vocal performances, and I'm very happy with the way the songs turned out. It all sounds very fresh and Borknagar-ish."

On 29 January 2010, Borknagar released the first track, "Havoc", exclusively on their MySpace page before the release of the album.

== Track listing ==
All tracks are written by Oystein G. Brun, except where noted

No.	Title	Writer(s)	Length
1.	"Havoc"		6:42
2.	"Reason"	Brun, Lars Nedland	6:55
3.	"The Stir of Seasons"		4:01
4.	"For a Thousand Years to Come"		6:46
5.	"Abrasion Tide"	Brun, Vintersorg	7:14
6.	"Fleshflower"	Nedland	3:28
7.	"Worldwide"		6:59
8.	"My Domain"		4:49
Total length:			46:54

== Personnel ==
Borknagar

- Andreas Hedlund (credited as "Vintersorg") – lead vocals
- Øystein G. Brun – acoustic guitar, electric guitar, high-string guitar
- Jens F. Ryland – lead guitar
- Jan Erik Tiwaz (credited as "Tyr") – fretless bass
- Lars A. Nedland – Hammond organ, keyboards, grand piano, backing vocals, vocals and drums (on "Fleshflower")
- David Kinkade – drums, percussion

Guest Musicians

- Simen Hestnæs (credited as "ICS Vortex") – vocals (on "My Domain")

== Production ==
- Borknagar – production, arrangements, mixing, engineering
- Børge Finstad – mixing, engineering
- Peter In de Betou – mastering
- Christophe Szpajdel – logo
