= Empiricism (album) =

Studio album by Borknagar
- Released: 22 October 2001
- Recorded: June–July 2001
- Studio: Fagerborg Studio (Oslo, Norway), Toproom Studio (Lunner, Norway)
- Genre: Progressive metal, black metal
- Length: 49:59
- Label: Century Media
- Producer: Borknagar, Børge Finstad

Borknagar chronology
Quintessence (2000)	Empiricism (2001)	Epic (2004)

Professional ratings
Review scores
Source	Rating
AllMusic	4/5 stars

Empiricism is the fifth studio album by Norwegian progressive metal band Borknagar. It is their first studio album to feature Vintersorg frontman Andreas Hedlund on vocals and Jan Erik "Tyr" Tiwaz on bass. It was also the last album to feature Jens F. Ryland on guitar until his return to the band in 2010.

The album was recorded at Fagerborg Studio and Toproom Studio during June and July 2001, and was mixed and produced by the band and Børge Finstad.

== Track listing ==
No.	Title	Lyrics	Music	Length
1.	"The Genuine Pulse"	Øystein G. Brun	Brun	4:51
2.	"Gods of My World"	Brun	Brun	4:25
3.	"The Black Canvas"	Lars A. Nedland	Brun	5:18
4.	"Matter and Motion"	Nedland	Nedland	2:30
5.	"Soul Sphere"	Brun	Brun	6:40
6.	"Inherit the Earth"	Asgeir Mickelson, Brun	Brun	5:29
7.	"The Stellar Dome"	Brun	Brun	5:36
8.	"Four Element Synchronicity"	Vintersorg	Brun	5:51
9.	"Liberated"	Nedland	Brun	4:51
10.	"The View of Everlast"	Tyr, Brun	Brun	4:28
Total length:				49:59

== Personnel ==
=== Borknagar ===
- Andreas Hedlund (credited as "Vintersorg") – vocals
- Øystein G. Brun – electric, acoustic and high string guitars
- Jens Fredrik Ryland – electric acoustic and high string guitar
- Jan Erik Tiwaz (credited as "Tyr") – 6 string and fretless bass
- Lars A. Nedland – synthesizer, Hammond organ, grand piano, backing vocals
- Asgeir Mickelson – drums, percussion

=== Production ===
- Borknagar – production, mixing
- Borge Finstad – production, mixing, engineer
- Ola Johansen – mastering
- Christophe Szpajdel – logo
