= Winter Thrice =

Studio album by Borknagar
- Released: 22 January 2016
- Recorded: October 2014 – June 2015
- Studios: Toproom Studio (Lunner, Norway) (drums), Crosound Studio (guitars), Mezzanine Studio (keys, fx and synthesizers; vocals), Waves Studio (vocals), Oak Hill (vocals)
- Genres: Progressive metal, black metal, folk metal
- Length: 49:38
- Label: Century Media
- Producers: Øystein G. Brun and Borknagar

Borknagar chronology
Urd (2012)	Winter Thrice (2016)	True North (2019)

Professional ratings
Review scores
Source	Rating
Rock Hard	9/10
Metal Hammer Germany	6/7
AntiHero Magazine	9/10 stars

Winter Thrice is the tenth studio album by Norwegian progressive metal band Borknagar. This is the only album to feature drummer Baard Kolstad and the last to feature longtime members Vintersorg and Jens F. Ryland.

== Track listing ==
All lyrics are written by Andreas Hedlund, except where noted; all music is composed by Øystein G. Brun, except on "Panorama", written by Lars A. Nedland.

No.	Title	Lyrics	Length
1.	"The Rhymes of the Mountain"	Brun	6:41
2.	"Winter Thrice"	Brun	6:13
3.	"Cold Runs the River"		5:52
4.	"Panorama"	Lars A. Nedland	5:51
5.	"When Chaos Calls"		7:02
6.	"Erodent"	Brun	6:56
7.	"Noctilucent"		3:54
8.	"Terminus"		7:07
Total length:			49:38

Limited edition digipak bonus track
No.	Title	Length
9.	"Dominant Winds"	7:18
Total length:		56:56

== Personnel ==
=== Borknagar ===
- Andreas Hedlund (credited as "Vintersorg") – clean vocals, harsh vocals, choirs
- Simen Hestnæs (credited as "ICS Vortex") – bass, clean vocals, choirs
- Øystein G. Brun – clean and electric guitars
- Jens F. Ryland – lead guitars
- Lars A. Nedland – keyboards, clean vocals, choirs
- Baard Kolstad – drums

=== Guest Musicians ===
- Kristoffer Rygg (credited as "Fiery G.") – lead vocals (on "Winter Thrice"), additional vocals (on "Terminus")
- Simen Daniel Børven – bass
- Pål Mathiesen – additional vocals (on "Erodent")

=== Staff ===
- Jens Bogren – mixing, mastering
- Christophe Szpajdel – logo

== Charts ==
Chart (2016)	Peak position
Finnish Albums (Suomen virallinen lista)	44
Swiss Albums (Schweizer Hitparade)	90
US Top Hard Rock Albums (Billboard)	15
US Top Heatseekers	17
