= Worlds I Create =

Studio album by Pantheon I
- Released: Europe: 29 July 2009; USA: 11 August 2009
- Recorded: January – February 2009 at Strand Studio
- Genre: Black metal
- Length: 47:30
- Label: Candlelight Records

Pantheon I chronology
The Wanderer And His Shadow (2006)	Worlds I Create (2009)

Professional ratings
Review scores
Source	Rating
Lords of Metal	(8.9/10)

Worlds I Create is the third full-length album from Norwegian black metal band, Pantheon I and was released in Europe on 29 July 2009 and in North America on 11 August of the same year.

As with the band's two previous albums the cover is a painting by Kjell Åge Meland.

== Track listing ==
1. "Myself Above All" – 7:09
2. "Defile the Trinity" – 5:14
3. "Serpent Christ" – 5:49
4. "Ascending" – 5:52
5. "Burn The Cross"– 4:55
6. "Bannlyst" – 5:44
7. "The Last Stand" – 5:33
8. "Written In Sand" – 7:04

== Credits ==
- Andrè Kvebek – vocals, guitar
- John Espen Sagstad – guitar
- Mads Guldbekkhei – drums
- Tor Risdal Stavenes – bass
- Live Julianne Kostøl – cello
- Additional guest vocals on “Ascending” by Jonas Renkse of Katatonia.
- All music and lyrics by Pantheon I.
- Engineered, Mixed and Mastered by Marius Strand
- Paintings by Kjell Åge Meland.
- Bandphoto by Espen Krokhaug
