= Megalomania (Enslavement of Beauty album) =

Studio album by Enslavement of Beauty
- Released: 2001
- Genre: Melodic black metal Symphonic black metal
- Length: 56:54
- Label: Voice of Wonder Records
- Producer: Fred Endresen; Enslavement of Beauty

Enslavement of Beauty chronology
| Traces o' Red (1999) | Megalomania (2001) | Mere Contemplations (2007) |

Megalomania is the second album released by Norwegian black metal band Enslavement of Beauty in 2001. The song "And to Temptation's Darkness Forever Abide" was added to the expanded version, where the track order also is different. All music was composed by Tony Eugene Tunheim, all lyrics was written by Ole Alexander Myrholt.

== Track listing ==
1. "Dainty Delusive Doll" – 4:05
2. "The Venial Blur" – 3:22
3. "Late Night, Red Wine Blight" – 4:12
4. "Malignant Midwinter Murders" – 4:22
5. "Comme Il Faut" – 4:51
6. "Benign Bohemian Brilliance" – 3:55
7. "Prudence Kept Her Purity" – 3:34
8. "Seven Dead Orchids" – 3:06
9. "The Dying Buds of May" – 4:53
10. "Fifteen Minutes" – 5:38
11. "Ye That Tempteth, Ye That Bequeth" – 4:00
12. "C17-H19-NO3-H2O" – 3:12
13. "Tangled in Grand Affection" – 3:46
14. "Crowd of Mourners" – 3:58

== Musicians ==
- Ole Alexander Myrholt – Vocals
- Tony Eugene Tunheim – Guitar, Keyboard
- Asgeir Mickelson – Drums
- Hans-Aage Holmen – Bass
- Julie Johnson – Vocals

== Other personnel ==
- Sten Brian Tunheim – Cover Art
- Fred Endresen – Effects
