= Mere Contemplations =

Studio album by Enslavement of Beauty
- Released: 6 August 2007
- Recorded: 2006; Farmyard Studio; Kamfer Studios
- Genre: Melodic black metal Symphonic black metal
- Length: 39:44
- Label: INRI Unlimited
- Producer: Tony Eugene Tunheim; Ole Alexander Myrholt

Enslavement of Beauty chronology
Megalomania (2001)	Mere Contemplations (2007)	The Perdition (2008)

Mere Contemplations is the third album by extreme metal band Enslavement of Beauty from Norway. The album was released in 2007 by INRI Unlimited. All music composed by Tony Eugene Tunheim, all lyrics written by Ole Alexander Myrholt except for parts of "X and Moments", from the poem "X. In a Library" by Emily Dickinson.

== Track listing ==
1. "A Study of Love and Metaphors" - 03:21
2. "X and Moments" - 04:07
3. "The Perilous Pursuit of Volition" - 03:31
4. "Exit There; and Disappear" - 05:07
5. "An Affinity for Exuberance" - 03:58
6. "Abundance Extends to Lush" - 03:44
7. "I Raise My craving Hands" - 03:27
8. "Nostalgia Grows" - 03:10
9. "Impressions" - 04:07
10. "11:23 pm" - 05:12

== Musicians ==
- Ole Alexander Myrholt - Vocals
- Tony Eugene Tunheim - Guitar, Keyboard
- Lisa T. Johnsen - Vocals

== Other personnel ==
- Sten Brian Tunheim - Cover Art
- Henrik Ryösä - Mastering
