= Storm Seeker (album) =

Studio album by ICS Vortex
- Released: August 22, 2011
- Recorded: 2011
- Genre: Progressive metal
- Length: 45:15
- Label: Century Media
- Producer: Børge Finstad, Asgeir Mickelson, ICS Vortex

Professional ratings
Review scores
Source	Rating
About.com	3.5/5 stars

Storm Seeker is the debut album by Norwegian musician ICS Vortex, released on 22 August 2011 in Europe and 23 August 2011 in North America.

== Album information ==
ICS Vortex describes "Storm Seeker" as "a tribute to the fall and rise of my kind. A generation of misfits, born of hippies and raised by Satan."

Regarding the influences that went into the making of the album, ICS Vortex said, "Inspiration is usually drawn from the things that are close to me. I always write in code, it's often doom related, but never ever whiny. The power of the elements, obscure beauty, religion, death and junk are a few favorites. Knowing I am drawn to the power of the dark side, I decided to include lighter topics into the mix this time to separate 'Storm Seeker' from 'Sideshow Symphonies': 'The Blackmobile' about Mopar and 'Aces' about gambling are the result. Love songs, really."

Commented ICS Vortex: "This song [The Blackmobile] was written way back when I still felt black metal was dangerous. Now, totally untrue to all that, it's a tribute to the only beast I ever loved."

"Storm Seeker" will be released in Europe as initial limited-edition digipak, 180-gram LP and as a digital download. According to a press release, the CD "takes the musical elements from ICS Vortex's 10-plus years of experience with Dimmu Borgir as well as the legacy of the classic bands with whom he is still active (Borknagar, Arcturus, and Lamented Souls), topping things off with his signature clean vocals in order to make 'Storm Seeker' become a perfectly balanced axe, whether a song is cutting fast, or dicing slow."

"Storm Seeker" features appearances by ICS Vortex's former Borknagar bandmate Asgeir Mickelson on drums and Terje "Cyrus" Andersen (Susperia, Dimmu Borgir) on some guitar solos. The CD was recorded at Toproom Studio (Mayhem, Tristania, Borknagar) with engineer Børge Finstad and mastered by Peter in de Betou at Tailor Maid Studio (Arch Enemy, Dark Tranquility, Dimmu Borgir) in Sweden.

== Track listing ==
All songs written and arranged by ICS Vortex.

No.	Title	Length
1.	"The Blackmobile"	3:16
2.	"Odin's Tree"	4:42
3.	"Skoal!"	2:29
4.	"Dogsmacked"	4:24
5.	"Aces"	3:41
6.	"Windward"	3:53
7.	"When Shuffled Off"	3:45
8.	"Oil in Water"	4:53
9.	"Storm Seeker"	6:30
10.	"Flaskeskipper"	2:47
11.	"The Sub Mariner"	4:35
Total length:		45:15

== Singles ==
- 29 June 2011: "The Blackmobile"
- 19 August 2011: "Odin's Tree"

== Personnel ==
- ICS Vortex – vocals, guitars, bass, keyboards, mouth harp on "Skoal!"
- Cyrus – lead guitars on tracks 1, 2 & 7
- Arne Martinussen – hammond organ on tracks 3 & 6, piano on track 9
- Asgeir Mickelson – drums, fx on "Flakeskipper"

Production

- Produced by ICS Vortex, Børge Finstad & Asgeir Mickelson
- Recorded and mixed by Børge Finstad
- Editing by Asgeir Mickelson
- Mastered by Peter Tägtgren
- All songs published by Magic Arts Music
