= The Olden Domain =

1997 studio album by Borknagar

Studio album by Borknagar
- Released: 18 August 1997
- Recorded: 29 May–13 June, 4–8 July 1997
- Studio: Woodhouse Studios (Hagen, Germany)
- Genre: Black metal, folk metal, progressive metal
- Length: 44:33
- Language: English, Norwegian
- Label: Century Media
- Producer: Borknagar

Borknagar chronology
| Borknagar (1996) | The Olden Domain (1997) | The Archaic Course (1998) |

Professional ratings
Review scores
| Source | Rating |
|---|---|
| AllMusic | 4.5/5 stars |
| Chronicles of Chaos | 8.5/10 |
| Collector's Guide to Heavy Metal | 8/10 |
| Metal Storm | 9/10 |
| Rock Hard | 8.0/10 |

The Olden Domain is the second studio album by Norwegian progressive metal band Borknagar, and their first to feature English lyrics. It also marks the beginning of the band's trademark progressive/folk/black metal sound used in subsequent records.

This would be the band's last studio album to feature Kristoffer Rygg on vocals. It is also their first album to feature Kai K. Lie on bass, replacing Infernus.

== Track listing ==
All tracks are written by Øystein G. Brun, except "Om hundrede aar er alting glemt", written by Ivar Bjørnson.

| No. | Title | Length |
|---|---|---|
| 1. | "The Eye of Oden" | 6:01 |
| 2. | "The Winterway" | 7:52 |
| 3. | "Om hundrede aar er alting glemt" ("In a Hundred Years Everything Is Forgotten") | 4:12 |
| 4. | "A Tale of Pagan Tongue" | 6:13 |
| 5. | "To Mount and Rove" | 4:56 |
| 6. | "Grimland Domain" | 6:19 |
| 7. | "Ascension of Our Fathers" | 3:54 |
| 8. | "The Dawn of the End" | 5:06 |
| Total length: | | 44:33 |

== Personnel ==
Borknagar

- Kristoffer Rygg (credited as "Fiery G. Maelstrom") – vocals
- Øystein G. Brun – guitars
- Kai K. Lie – bass
- Ivar Bjørnson – synthesizer, sound effects
- Erik Brødreskift – drums

Production

- Borknagar – production, arrangements
- Matthias Klinkmann – engineer
- Eroc – mixing
- Christophe Szpajdel – logo
