= A Sceptic's Universe =

Studio album by Spiral Architect
- Released: Japan: December 16, 1999, International: January 18, 2000
- Genre: Progressive metal
- Length: 43:48
- Label: Sensory
- Producer: Neil Kernon

A Sceptic's Universe is the debut and sole album by Norwegian progressive metal band Spiral Architect. It was recorded and mixed by Neil Kernon. In 2024, it was named one of the 10 "wackiest" progressive metal albums ever by Loudwire.

== Track listing ==
No.	Title	Length
1.	"Spinning"	3:23
2.	"Excessit"	6:14
3.	"Moving Spirit"	3:44
4.	"Occam's Razor"	1:33
5.	"Insect"	5:54
6.	"Cloud Constructor"	5:25
7.	"Conjuring Collapse"	6:31
8.	"Adaptability"	4:34
9.	"Fountainhead"	6:30
Total length:		43:48

Japanese bonus track: "Prelude to Ruin" (Fates Warning cover) (07:34)

== Personnel ==
- Øyvind Hægeland - vocals, keyboards
- Steinar Gundersen - lead, rhythm and acoustic guitars
- Kaj Gornitzka - rhythm guitar
- Lars K. Norberg - bass, programming
- Asgeir Mickelson - drums
- Sean Malone - stick on track 4 (guest)
- Andreas Moxnes - additional programming, midi-execution on track 4 (guest)

Production

- Neil Kernon - production, mixing, editing, recording
