= Traces o' Red =

Studio album by Enslavement of Beauty
- Released: 1999
- Recorded: Studio Nord; Mars 1999
- Genre: Melodic black metal Symphonic black metal
- Length: 49:23
- Label: Voices of Wonder
- Producer: Fred Endresen; Enslavement of Beauty

Enslavement of Beauty chronology
Devilry and Temptation (demo) (1998)	Traces o' Red (1999)	Megalomania (2001)

Traces o' Red is the debut album by Norwegian black metal band Enslavement of Beauty. It was released in 1999. All music was composed by Tony Eugene Tunheim, and all lyrics were written by Ole Alexander Myrholt except for "Dreams", a poem from 1827 by Edgar Allan Poe. Cover Design was by Sten Brian Tunheim.

== Track listing ==
1. In Thro' the Cave of Impressions – 1:29
2. Traces o' Red – The Fall and Rise of Vitality – 4:30
3. Be Thou My Lethe and Bleeding Quietus – 4:31
4. Dreams – 4:25
5. Something Unique – 4:14
6. The Poem of Dark Subconscious Desire – 5:05
7. Eerily Seductive – 4:32
8. My Irreverent Pilgrimage – 4:14
9. And Still I Wither – 5:14
10. I Dedicate My Beauty to the Stars – 11:09
11. The Masquerade of Rhapsody (Japanese bonus track) – 3:36
12. Colleen (Japanese bonus track) – 1:54

== Musicians ==
- Ole Alexander Myrholt – Vocals
- Tony Eugene Tunheim – Guitar, Keyboard

== Other personnel ==
- Sten Brian Tunheim – Cover Art
- Fred Endresen – Engineer, Mixing, Sampling, Producer
