= Borknagar (album) =

Studio album by Borknagar
- Released: 3 August 1996
- Recorded: October 1995 – January 1996
- Studio: Grieghallen Studio (Bergen, Norway)
- Genre: Black metal, Viking metal
- Length: 44:12
- Language: Norwegian
- Label: Malicious
- Producer: Pytten

Borknagar chronology
Borknagar (1996)	The Olden Domain (1997)

Professional ratings
Review scores
Source	Rating
AllMusic	4/5 stars
Chronicles of Chaos	7/10
Collector's Guide to Heavy Metal	6/10
Distorted Sound	9/10
Rock Hard	8.0/10
Sputnikmusic	4/5

Borknagar is the debut studio album by Norwegian progressive metal band Borknagar. It is their only album to feature Norwegian lyrics and their only album to feature Roger "Infernus" Tiegs on bass guitar (who reportedly recorded all his bass parts in a single day). The album was recorded at Grieghallen Studios (frequented by other black metal bands such as Burzum, Emperor and Gorgoroth).

The album features a more straightforward black/Viking metal approach (featuring heavy riffs, blasting tempos and an emphasis on harsh vocals) as opposed to the band's now trademark progressive/folk sound they would hint at on their next album, The Olden Domain.

== Track listing ==
All tracks are written by Øystein G. Brun, except "Tanker mot tind (Kvelding)" and "Tanker mot tind (Gryning)", written by Ivar Bjørnson.

No.	Title	Length
1.	"Vintervredets sjelesagn" ("Soul Tale of the Winter Wrath")	6:44
2.	"Tanker mot tind (Kvelding)" ("Thoughts Towards the Peak (Dusk)")	3:29
3.	"Svartskogs gilde" ("Black Forest's Feast")	5:52
4.	"Ved steingard" ("By the Stone Wall")	2:14
5.	"Krigsstev" ("War Song")	2:03
6.	"Dauden" ("Death")	5:49
7.	"Grimskalle trell" ("Grim Skull Slave")	5:38
8.	"Nord naagauk" ("Northern Cuckoo")	3:07
9.	"Fandens allheim" ("The Devil's Universe")	6:19
10.	"Tanker mot tind (Gryning)" ("Thoughts Towards the Peak (Dawn)")	2:57
Total length:		44:12

== Personnel ==
Borknagar

- Kristoffer Rygg (credited as "Garm") – vocals
- Øystein G. Brun – guitars
- Roger Tiegs (credited as "Infernus") – bass
- Ivar Bjørnson – synth
- Erik Brødreskift (credited as "Grim") – drums

Other credits

- Eirik "Pytten" Hundvin – production, mixing, mastering
- Christophe Szpajdel – logo
