= The Perdition EP =

EP by Enslavement of Beauty
- Released: 15 January 2009
- Recorded: 2008; Farmyard Studio; Kamfer Studios
- Genre: Melodic black metal Symphonic black metal
- Label: INRI Unlimited
- Producer: Henrik Ryösä; Tony Eugene Tunheim; Ole Alexander Myrholt

Enslavement of Beauty chronology
Mere Contemplations (2007)	The Perdition EP (2009)	TBA (2009)

The Perdition EP is an album from the Norwegian metal band Enslavement of Beauty that was released in January 2009. The album was recorded at Farmyard Studio and Kamfer Studios, in Mosjøen, Norway and was released by INRI Unlimited. All music is written and performed by Tony Eugene Tunheim, the lyrics are written and vocals performed by Ole Alexander Myrholt. Cover art by Sten Brian Tunheim. The EP was mixed and mastered by Henrik Ryösä at VoxHouse Studio in Sweden and produced by Henrik Ryösä with Tony Eugene Tunheim. A video for the song "Lush", produced by Sten Brian Tunheim, was recorded in Bergen in springtime 2008 and was released on 12 December on YouTube and on the band's Myspace.

== Track listing ==
1. A Kodak Kiss (intro)
2. I Treasure the Sadness
3. Lush
4. Severely Flawed
5. Mirror Souls
6. I Descend to Perdition

== Musicians ==
- Ole Alexander Myrholt - vocals
- Tony Eugene Tunheim - guitar, bass guitar, keyboard
- Lisa T. Johnsen - vocals

== Other personnel ==
- Sten Brian Tunheim - Cover Art
- Henrik Ryösä - Mixing, Mastering
