= White Ward =

Ukrainian black metal band

- Origin: Odesa, Ukraine
- Genres: Black metal; blackgaze; post-metal; dark jazz
- Years active: 2012–present
- Label: Debemur Morti
- Members: Yurii Kazaryan; Ievgen Karamushko; Dima Dudko; Mykola Previr
- Past members: List of White Ward former members

White Ward is a Ukrainian black metal band from Odesa, formed in 2012. The band currently consists of founding guitarist Yurii Kazaryan, drummer Ievgen Karamushko, saxophonist Dima Dudko and guitarist Mykola Previr. Andrii Pechatkin, former vocalist and bassist, parted ways with the band in 2024.

The band is known for combining post-black metal with elements of dark jazz. They have released three albums to date: Futility Report (2017), Love Exchange Failure (2019) and False Light (2022).

== History ==
The band was formed by guitarist Yurii Kazaryan in 2012. He recruited multiple members to play with him, but they left the band after short tenures. Bassist Andrii Pechatkin joined the band in 2015. Kazaryan recalled how difficult it was to put the band together as its members lived in different cities throughout Ukraine, with Pechatkin traveling 20 hours by train to attend band rehearsals. The band's name is in reference to a hospital ward in a mental asylum because it was relevant to themes of mental illness in their music.

White Ward's debut album Futility Report was recorded from 2014 to 2016 throughout Odesa, Kherson and Cherkasy. It featured a lineup consisting of Andrew Rodin on vocals, Kazaryan and Igor Palamarchuk on guitars, Pechatkin on bass, Yurii Kononov on drums and Alexey Iskimzhi on saxophone. It was released on 12 May 2017.

The band underwent drastic roster turnover following their debut's release. Kazaryan and Pechatkin were the only members to remain in the band, with Pechatkin also assuming the role of lead vocalist following Rodin's departure. Ievgen Karamushko became the band's drummer, Serhii Darienko became the band's second guitarist, and Dima Dudko the saxophonist. White Ward's second album Love Exchange Failure was released on 20 September 2019. The album's cover art is a picture of Tokyo at night, and Kazaryan said the album "is fully about the real social and psychological horrors that have a place in the modern megapolis", in contrast to the occult and Lovecraftian themes of their debut. Loudwire named "Poisonous Flowers of Violence" as one of the 10 catchiest black metal songs. In October 2019, the band toured Europe to promote the album.

For White Ward's third album, Mykola Previr became the band's new second guitarist. The album False Light was released on 17 June 2022, four months after the Russian invasion of Ukraine. While the album does not specifically touch upon the current war, Kazaryan said, "it covers lots of problems associated with modern Ukrainian history as well as some deep inner thoughts and experiences … Therefore, it links to modern Ukrainian culture that gets born out of the fire and destruction that cover our homeland."

White Ward's 2023 tour, which included a performance at the popular Dutch heavy music Roadburn Festival, was cancelled because the Ukrainian government denied the band permission to exit the country during wartime.

== Members ==
Current members

- Yurii Kazaryan – guitars, backing vocals (2012–present)
- Ievgen Karamushko – drums (2017–present)
- Dima Dudko – saxophone (2019–present)
- Mykola Previr – guitars (2019–present)

Touring members

- Olexandr Bretman – vocals (2024–present)
- Oleksandr Nechaiev – bass (2024–present)

Former members

- Vladimir "Valter" Kudryavtsev – vocals (2012)
- Sightless Clown – drums (2012)
- Alexander Smirnov – guitars (2012–2013)
- Alexey Sidorenko – vocals (2012–2014)
- Vladimir "Fou" Bauer – bass (2012–2015)
- Yurii Kononov – drums (2012–2017)
- Andrew Rodin – vocals (2015–2017)
- Ihor Palamarchuk – guitars (2015–2017)
- Alexey Iskimzhi – saxophone (2016–2017)
- Andrii Mai – vocals (2017–2018)
- Sergey Darienko – guitars (2017–2019)
- Andrii Pechatkin – bass (2015–2024), vocals (2018–2024)

Timeline

== Discography ==
Studio albums

- Futility Report (2017)
- Love Exchange Failure (2019)
- False Light (2022)

Extended plays

- Illusions (2012)
- Riptide (2014)
- Debemur Morti (2021)

Other releases

- I (2012, demo)
- When Gift Becomes Damnation / Inhale My Despair (2012, demo)
- Silence of the Old Man / White Ward / Sauroctonos (2014, split)
- Origins (2016, compilation)
