= Jens Fredrik Ryland =

Norwegian guitarist (born 1974)

- Born: 5 May 1974 (age 52); Narvik, Norway
- Genres: Progressive metal; black metal; folk metal
- Occupation: Guitarist
- Member of: Borknagar

Jens Fredrik Ryland (born 5 May 1974) is a Norwegian guitarist most notable for his work with the progressive metal band Borknagar. He is known also for being the founder of the Inferno Festival in Oslo.

== Biography ==
Jens was born in Narvik Municipality, Norway and grew up in Evenes Municipality. His first instrument was the piano before he moved on to guitar at the age of 10. First band experience was through the local youth club which led to the first concert already at the age of 14 in front of 400 kids at the festival Rock Mot Rus March 1989. In 1991, he and some friends formed Gangland, a '70s and '80s hard rock cover band. They did several gigs in the two-year period they were together, among these performing at Rock Mot Rus both in 1992 and- 93. The band was disbanded as Jens joined the airforce.

Jens joined Borknagar in 1997. He technically left the band in 2003, but performed at all concerts between 2003 and 2007. In this period Borknagar recorded Epic and Origin without Jens' participation. He formally rejoined again in 2007 and participated in the recording of Universal. Jens further participated on Urd and Winter Thrice before departing in January 2018.

In 2011, Jens joined the solo project of ICS Vortex and was a part of the lineup for about a year.

== Inferno Festival ==
Ryland founded Oslo's famous "Inferno Festival" in 2001 fuelled by a desire for the Norwegian metal community to unite, focusing on extreme music. In that year, the festival already included 22 of the biggest names in the metal scene, like Borknagar and Enslaved. After two years, Jens decided to leave.

== Discography ==
Borknagar

- The Archaic Course (1998)
- Quintessence (2000)
- Empiricism (2001)
- Universal (2010)
- Urd (2012)
- Winter Thrice (2016)
