= Fission (band) =

Swedish melodic death metal band

- Origin: Sweden
- Genres: Thrash metal, melodic death metal
- Years active: 2002–present
- Label: Napalm
- Members: Vintersorg; Benny Hägglund

Fission is a Swedish melodic death metal band formed in 2002. The band began as Benny Hägglund's personal project to fuse melody and aggression into his music. After writing some material, he sought aid from Andreas Hedlund of Vintersorg, the band in which Hägglund plays live session drums. After recording a two-track demo with Hägglund playing all instruments and Hedlund singing, they signed with Austrian label Napalm Records. Hägglund continued writing all the songs for their first album, while Hedlund provided the lyrics, vocals, keyboards, and sound effects. They released their debut album, Crater, on April 27, 2004.

== Discography ==
- Crater (2004)
  1. "Mechanism" – 0:43
  2. "Crater" – 4:44
  3. "Accelerator" – 5:02
  4. "Empty Nimbus" – 3:16
  5. "Magnetism" – 5:55
  6. "Catastrophe Consumer" – 3:49
  7. "The Core: 118 Protons of Insanity" – 0:44
  8. "Mind Vortex" – 4:42
  9. "The Chaos Algorithm" – 3:34
  10. "Eremiten" – 3:26
  11. "Syndrome" - 6:50
- Pain Parade (2008)
