= Quintessence (Borknagar album) =

Studio album by Borknagar
- Released: 17 April 2000
- Recorded: January 2000
- Studio: The Abyss (Pärlby, Sweden)
- Genre: Black metal, progressive metal
- Length: 43:28
- Label: Century Media
- Producer: Borknagar, Peter Tägtgren

Borknagar chronology
The Archaic Course (1998)	Quintessence (2000)	Empiricism (2001)

Professional ratings
Review scores
Source	Rating
AllMusic	4/5 stars

Quintessence is the fourth studio album by Norwegian progressive metal band Borknagar. It was recorded at The Abyss Studios in January 2000 and mixed by Peter Tägtgren.

According to the members of the band, this album was initially meant to be a relatively straightforward black metal release, as indicated by the production quality and the emphasis on harsh vocals rather than clean singing.

Vocalist Simen "ICS Vortex" Hestnæs plays bass guitar on the album, following the departure of former bassist Kai K. Lie prior to recording sessions for the album. Original keyboardist Ivar Bjørnson and drummer Eric "Grim" Brødreskift were also replaced by Lars A. Nedland and Asgeir Mickelson respectively. Quintessence would also be the last Borknagar album to feature Hestnæs, who left to join Dimmu Borgir (reportedly due to an ultimatum on Øystein Brun's part), until his return in 2010.

== Track listing ==
No.	Title	Lyrics	Music	Length
1.	"Rivalry of Phantoms"	Øystein G. Brun	Brun	4:36
2.	"The Presence Is Ominous"	Brun	Brun	4:55
3.	"Ruins of the Future"	Brun	Brun	4:55
4.	"Colossus"	Asgeir Mickelson	ICS Vortex	4:27
5.	"Inner Landscape" (instrumental)		Lars A. Nedland	2:51
6.	"Invincible"	Brun	Brun	4:25
7.	"Icon Dreams"	Brun	Brun	4:32
8.	"Genesis Torn"	Mickelson	Brun	5:16
9.	"Embers" (instrumental)		Brun	1:26
10.	"Revolt"	Brun	Brun	6:05
Total length:				43:28

== Personnel ==
=== Borknagar ===
- Simen Hestnæs (credited as "ICS Vortex") – vocals, bass
- Øystein G. Brun – guitars
- Jens F. Ryland – guitars
- Lars A. Nedland – synth
- Asgeir Mickelson – drums

=== Production ===
- Borknagar – production, arrangements
- Peter Tagtgren – production, mixing, engineer
- Lars Szoke – engineer
- Tom Kvallsvoll – mastering
- Christophe Szpajdel – logo
