= Ancient Wisdom =

Swedish metal band

Ancient Wisdom is a Swedish atmospheric black metal band. They have released five albums on Avantgarde Music.

Ancient Wisdom was started in 1992 as a project of Marcus E. Norman from Bewitched. Named Ancient, the name had to be changed because of the Norwegian band having laid claim to it. Following two demos, Ancient Wisdom released its first album For Snow Covered the Northland in 1996.

== Discography ==
- For Snow Covered the Northland (1996)
- The Calling (1997)
- ...and the Physical Shape of Light Bled (2000)
- Cometh Doom, Cometh Death (2004)
- A Celebration in Honor of Death (2021)
