= The Archaic Course =

Studio album by Borknagar
- Released: 20 October 1998
- Recorded: 17 August – 5 September 1998
- Studio: Woodhouse Studios (Hagen, Germany)
- Genre: Progressive metal, folk metal, black metal
- Length: 37:46
- Label: Century Media
- Producer: Borknagar, Matthias Klinkmann

Borknagar chronology
The Olden Domain (1997)	The Archaic Course (1998)	Quintessence (2000)

Professional ratings
Review scores
Source	Rating
AllMusic	4/5 stars
Chronicles of Chaos	8/10
Collector's Guide to Heavy Metal	9/10
Rock Hard	8.5/10
Sputnikmusic	4/5

The Archaic Course is the third studio album by Norwegian progressive metal band Borknagar. It is the first album to feature Simen "ICS Vortex" Hestnæs on vocals following the departure of Kristoffer "Garm" Rygg (who, according to Øystein Brun, "didn't want to scream anymore"), and the first with guitarist Jens F. Ryland. The album also features contributions from Enslaved guitarist Ivar Bjørnson, although he was not credited as part of the band in the album's liner notes. This is also the last album to feature drummer and founding member Erik "Grim" Brødreskift, who died of a deliberate drug overdose shortly after its release.

== Track listing ==
No.	Title	Lyrics	Music	Length
1.	"Oceans Rise"	Øystein G. Brun	Brun	5:27
2.	"Universal"	Brun	Brun	5:35
3.	"The Witching Hour"	ICS Vortex	Ivar Bjørnson, Brun	4:26
4.	"The Black Token"	Brun	Brun	5:19
5.	"Nocturnal Vision"	Vortex	Brun	4:35
6.	"Ad Noctum"	Vortex, Brun	Vortex	4:22
7.	"Winter Millenium"	Brun	Brun	5:44
8.	"Fields of Long Gone Presence/Outro" (instrumental)		Bjørnson	2:18
Total length:				37:46

== Personnel ==
Borknagar

- Simen Hestnæs (credited as "ICS Vortex") – vocals, synthesizer and sound effects (on "Ad Noctum")
- Øystein G. Brun – guitars
- Jens F. Ryland – guitars
- Kai K. Lie – bass
- Erik Brødreskift (credited as "Grim") – drums

Additional personnel

- Ivar Bjørnson – synthesizer and sound effects (all tracks, except "Ad Noctum")
- Christophe Szpajdel – logo
