= Asgeir Mickelson =

Norwegian musician and artist (born 1969)

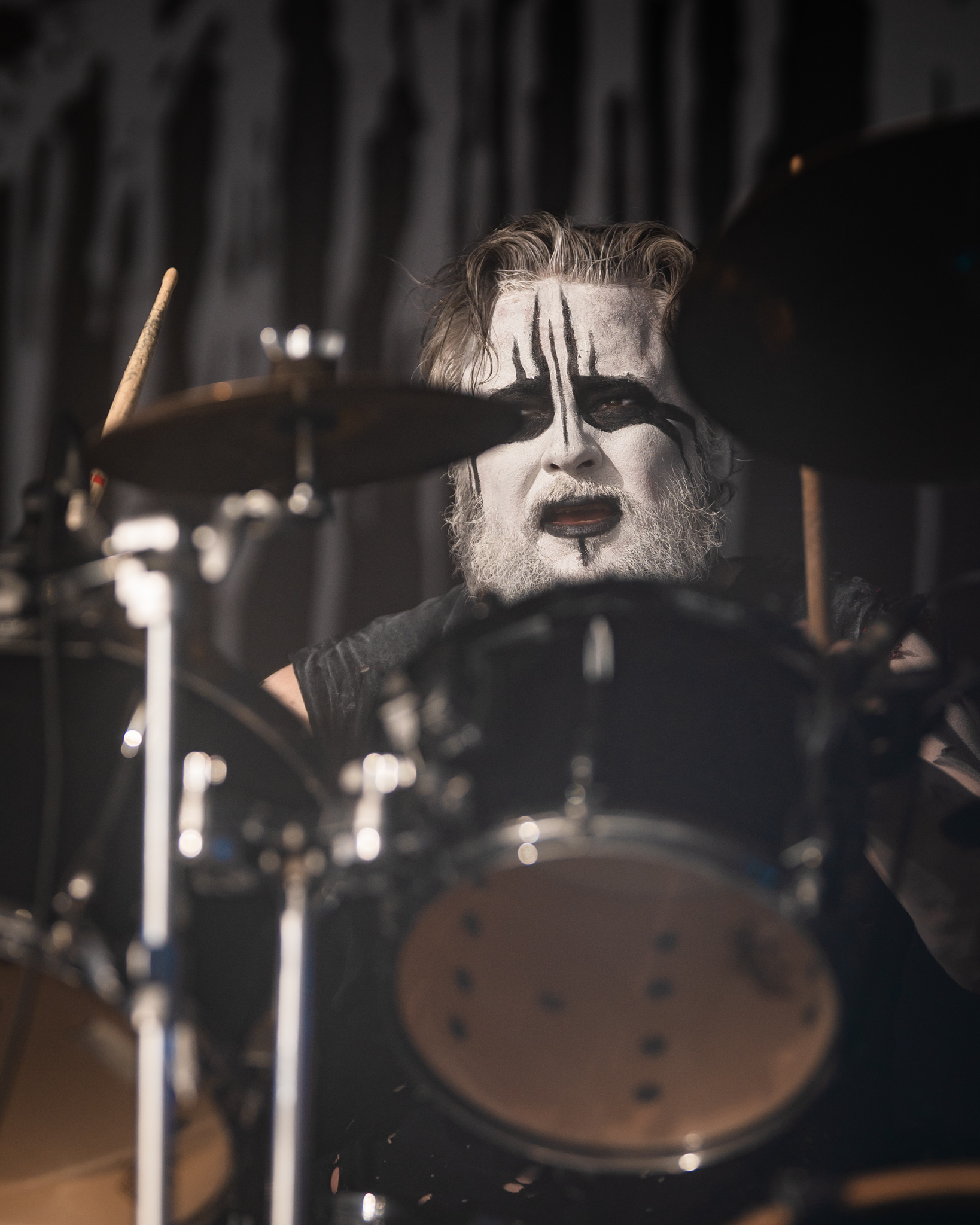

Background information
- Born: Asgeir Mickelson; 30 September 1969 (age 56)
- Origin: Norway
- Genres: Progressive metal, black metal, death metal, thrash metal, doom metal, heavy metal
- Occupations: Musician, songwriter, graphic designer
- Instruments: Drums, percussion, guitars, bass

Asgeir Mickelson (born 30 September 1969) is a Norwegian musician, artist, photographer and music reviewer. Although primarily known as a drummer, he is also an accomplished guitarist and bassist.

== Biography ==
Mickelson has stated on his official message board that he started playing guitar roughly around 1982, and switched to drums in 1988–1989. He took two drum lessons in 1991, and is otherwise self-taught. He began playing guitar again in late 2002 and has stated on his forum that he has been recording solo thrash metal. He has also said that he is working on a doom metal album similar to the works of Candlemass. To this date he has only been employed as a drummer in all of the bands he is or has been a member of, excluding Borknagar on their album Epic, where he played drums, bass, and played the guitar on the track "The Weight of Wind".

Mickelson has been a member of several metal bands, among which the best known ones are Spiral Architect, which he co-founded, and Borknagar. He has also contributed session drums and live drumwork for several bands and artists, including Ihsahn's first solo album The Adversary and the albums Visions from the Spiral Generator and The Focusing Blur by Vintersorg. He later joined Norwegian death metal band Thornbound as drummer.

Aside from his work as a musician, Mickelson has worked as a writer for Scream Magazine in addition to his work as a graphic designer. Mickelson is the lead designer for Scream Magazine and the Inferno Metal Festival. He has arranged Scream Magazine's festival Screamfest and Norwegian Metal Awards. He designed the artwork for the Trivial Act Mindscape album, three Borknagar albums, and Scariot's Momentum Shift. He is a web designer as well and worked on a Norwegian drummer website entitled Blastbeat.no, which will feature various drummers from the extreme metal world, including Jan Axel Blomberg, Trym Torson, Frost, Tjodalv, Horgh, Bård Faust and himself.

He has owned and run the Multimono recording studio in Norway, where he produced and engineered recordings, including the latest Scariot album. Additionally, such bands as Scariot, Twisted into Form, Red Harvest, Solefald and Myoclon recorded on its premises. John Jacobsen of Sturmgeist also recorded his melodic death metal album with ENE there.

Asgeir quit Borknagar due to creative differences in 2008. In May 2011 Asgeir joined Jens F Ryland in the band Artisan, and also began working on the Artisan Norway website "A Metal Soapbox and Music project".

Outside of music, he is responsible for the release of a Norwegian poker magazine entitled Norsk pokermagasin.

== Discography ==
=== Borknagar ===
- Quintessence (2000)
- Empiricism (2001)
- Epic (drums and bass on entire album as well as select guitar parts; 2004)
- Origin (2006)

=== Enslavement of Beauty ===
- Megalomania (session drummer; 2001)

=== Hardingrock ===
- Grimen (session drummer; 2007)

=== Highland Glory ===
- Live session drummer (2003) playing 5 Iron Maiden cover songs

=== ICS Vortex ===
- Storm Seeker (drums; 2011)

=== Ihsahn ===
- The Adversary (2006)
- angL (2008)
- After (2010)

=== Lunaris ===
- As drummer (May 1999)
- Demo 2000 (session drummer; demo; 2000)
- Creative Destruction (session drummer; demo; 2000)
- The Infinite (session drummer; demo; 2002)
- Cyclic (session drummer on the song "When It Ends"; 2004)

=== Myoclon ===
- Session drummer and producer

=== Sarke ===
- Oldarhian (2011)
- Aruagint (2013)

=== Scariot ===
- Momentum Shift (2007)

=== Spiral Architect ===
- Spiral Architect (demo, 1996)
- A Sceptic's Universe (2000)

=== Sturmgeist ===
- Live session drummer (2005). One week tour in Europe.

=== Testament ===
- Live session drummer (2003). One gig in San Francisco and 2 week headlining tour in Europe (No Mercy festival)

=== Veil of Secrets ===
- Dead Poetry (guitars, bass, and drums; 2020)

=== Vintersorg ===
- Visions from the Spiral Generator (2002)
- The Focusing Blur (2004)
