= Spiral Architect =

Norwegian progressive metal band

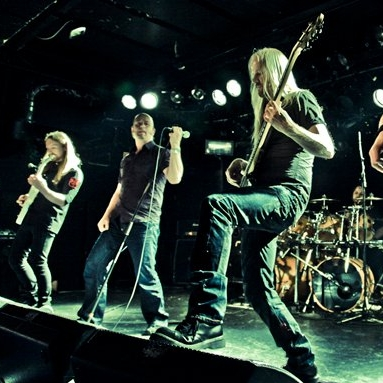

Background information
- Origin: Oslo, Norway
- Genres: Progressive metal
- Years active: 1993−present
- Label: Sensory
- Members: Øyvind Hægeland; Steinar Gundersen; Lars K. Norberg; Asgeir Mickelson
- Past members: Andreas Jonsson; Kaj Gornitzka; Leif Knashaug
- Website: spiralarchitect.com

Spiral Architect is a Norwegian progressive metal band from Oslo. The group formed in 1993 and recorded one demo and one full-length album, A Sceptic's Universe, as well as a cover of Fates Warning's "A Prelude to Ruin" for the tribute album Through Different Eyes – A Tribute to Fates Warning. Since that time, the various group's members have moved on to other bands and musical projects. Even though the group got together for a couple of songwriting sessions, a second album has never materialized.

== Band members ==
=== Members ===
- Øyvind Hægeland − vocals, backing vocals, keyboards
- Steinar Gundersen − lead, rhythm and acoustic guitars
- Lars K. Norberg − bass, programming
- Asgeir Mickelson − drums

=== Former members ===
- Andreas Jonsson − rhythm guitar
- Kaj Gornitzka − rhythm guitar, backing vocals
- Leif Knashaug − vocals

== Discography ==
- Spiral Architect (demo) (1995)
- A Sceptic's Universe (2000)

== Band name ==
In a 2005 post on the band's Ultimate Metal forum by co-founding member Lars K. Norberg, the band name is unrelated to the Black Sabbath song of the same title from their 1973 album Sabbath Bloody Sabbath. Although Norberg claims Black Sabbath is "probably my favourite band ever", according to Norberg the name "reflects the 'spirit' of the band, musically as well as ideologically".
