= Pantheon I =

Norwegian band

- Origin: Oslo, Norway
- Years active: 2002 – present
- Label: Candlelight Records
- Spinoff of: 1349
- Members: Andrè Kvebek; John Espen Sagstad; Aethyris McKay; Tor Risdal Stavenes; Mads Guldbekkhei; Live Julianne Kostøl
- Website: Official Homepage

Pantheon I is an extreme metal band from Oslo, Norway, that shares current and former members with 1349. The lineup includes a cello player. They have been praised for experimenting with their sound while keeping the black metal ethos.

== History ==
Tjalve founded Pantheon I as a side-project in 2002. He left 1349 in 2006 to focus on Pantheon I. Seidemann (still in 1349) joined him in 2004.

In December 2007, the band toured France to support Mayhem.

In November 2008, they recorded the song "I'll Come Back As Fire", which was featured in the Chad Ferrin-directed horror movie Someone's Knocking at the Door.

They released their most recent album, Worlds I Create, on 29 July 2009 in Europe and 11 August in North America.

At the start of 2010, Pantheon I played the Summer Breeze Open Air heavy metal festival in Germany.

In November 2010, Aethyris McKay left Absu and joined Pantheon I. McKay took over guitar from Kvebek, who would focus on vocals. McKay would also sing clean vocals.

== Discography ==
- Atrocity Divine - (2006)
- The Wanderer And His Shadow - (2007)
- Worlds I Create - (2009)

== Band members ==
- Andrè Kvebek - vocals and guitar (ex-1349)
- John Espen Sagstad - guitar
- Aethyris McKay - guitar
- Tor Risdal Stavenes - bass (Seidemann in 1349)
- Mads Guldbekkhei - drums
- Live Julianne Kostøl - cello
