= Øystein Brun =

Norwegian guitarist

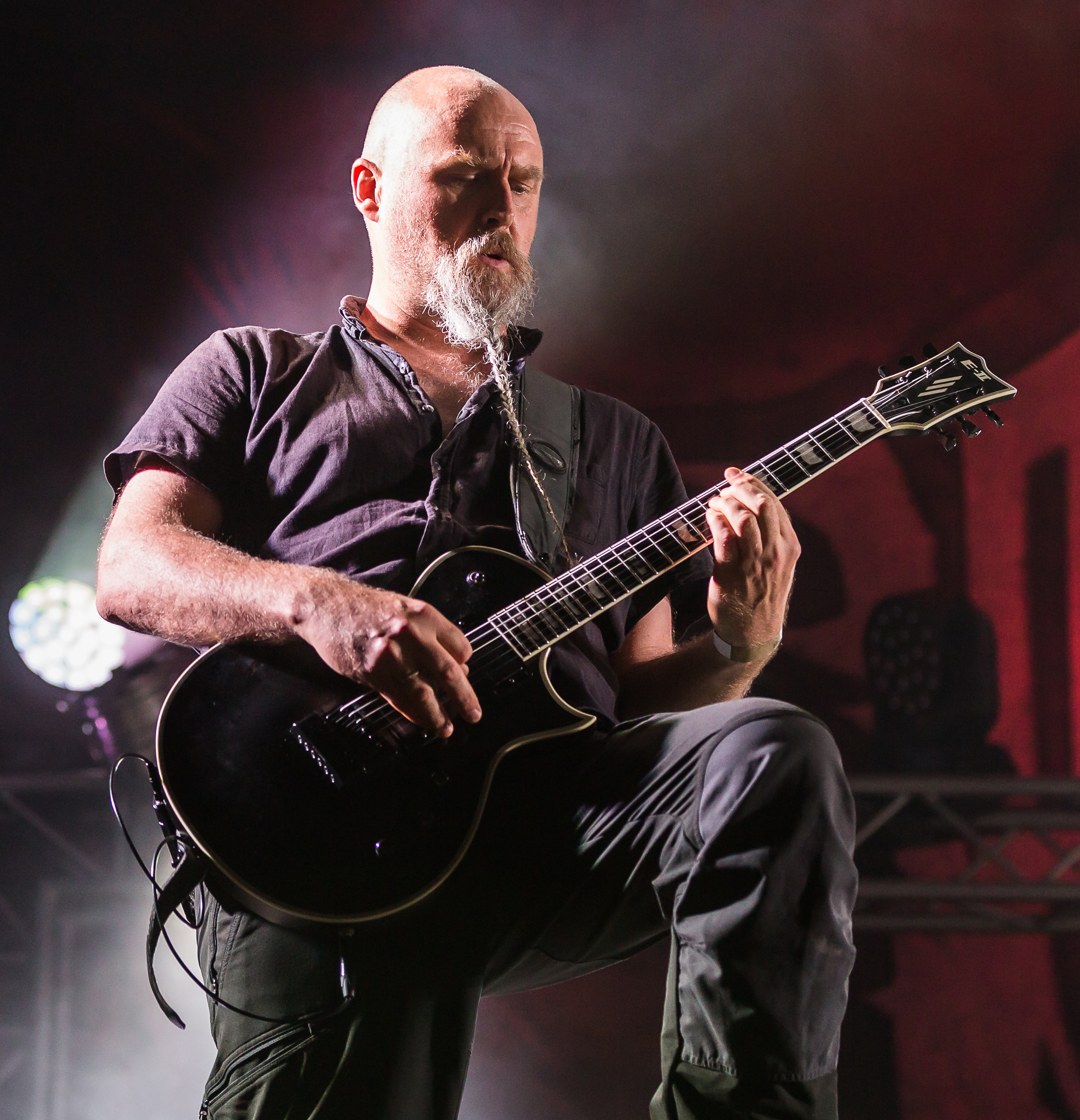
- Brun performing in 2023

Background information
- Born: 14 April 1975 (age 51)
- Origin: Norway
- Genres: Progressive metal; black metal; folk metal
- Occupations: Musician; songwriter
- Instrument: Guitar
- Years active: 1991–present
- Member of: Borknagar, Cronian
- Formerly of: Molested

Øystein Garnes Brun (born 14 April 1975) is a Norwegian guitarist who is a member of the progressive metal band Borknagar. He is the only permanent member of the group and wrote the majority of their songs. Brun is noted for having many albums already written ahead of time.

== Career ==
After releasing two full-length albums with the death metal band Molested, Brun grew tired of playing death metal, and decided to form a more melodic metal band, inspired by the burgeoning black metal scene. He wrote a group of songs which would eventually become the first songs by Borknagar.

=== Borknagar ===
Brun gathered a cast of musicians who were well known in the black metal scene including Infernus of Gorgoroth, Erik Brødreskift of Immortal and Gorgoroth, Ivar Bjørnson of Enslaved, and Kristoffer Rygg of Ulver, Head Control System, and Arcturus. The stature of these musicians caused Malicious Records to award the band with a contract without even hearing them. After the release of their debut album, the band was signed to Century Media, where they remained until 2006. In 2007, they had a three-album contract with Indie Recordings, which was terminated in 2011. The band resigned to Century Media shortly after. Through the years, the personnel has changed, but the sound is influenced mainly by Brun, so the style of music has been consistent despite a revolving lineup.

=== Cronian ===
In 2004, Brun and Andreas Hedlund founded Cronian, an epic sounding heavy metal band which had been in planning stages since before Hedlund had joined Borknagar. Their debut album Terra was produced by Dan Swanö and released in 2006 on Century Media.

== Discography ==
=== With Molested ===
- Blod Draum (1995)
- Stormvold (EP) (1997)

=== With Borknagar ===
- Borknagar (1996, Malicious Records, Century Black)
- The Olden Domain (1997, Century Black)
- The Archaic Course (1998, Century Media Records)
- Quintessence (2000, Century Media Records)
- Empiricism (2001, Century Media Records)
- Epic (2004, Century Media Records)
- Origin (2006, Century Media Records)
- Urd (2012, Century Media)
- Winter Thrice (2016, Century Media)
- True North (2019, Century Media)
- Fall (2024, Century Media)

=== With Cronian ===
- Terra (2006)
- Enterprise (2008)
- Erathems (2013)
