= Borknagar =

Norwegian progressive metal band

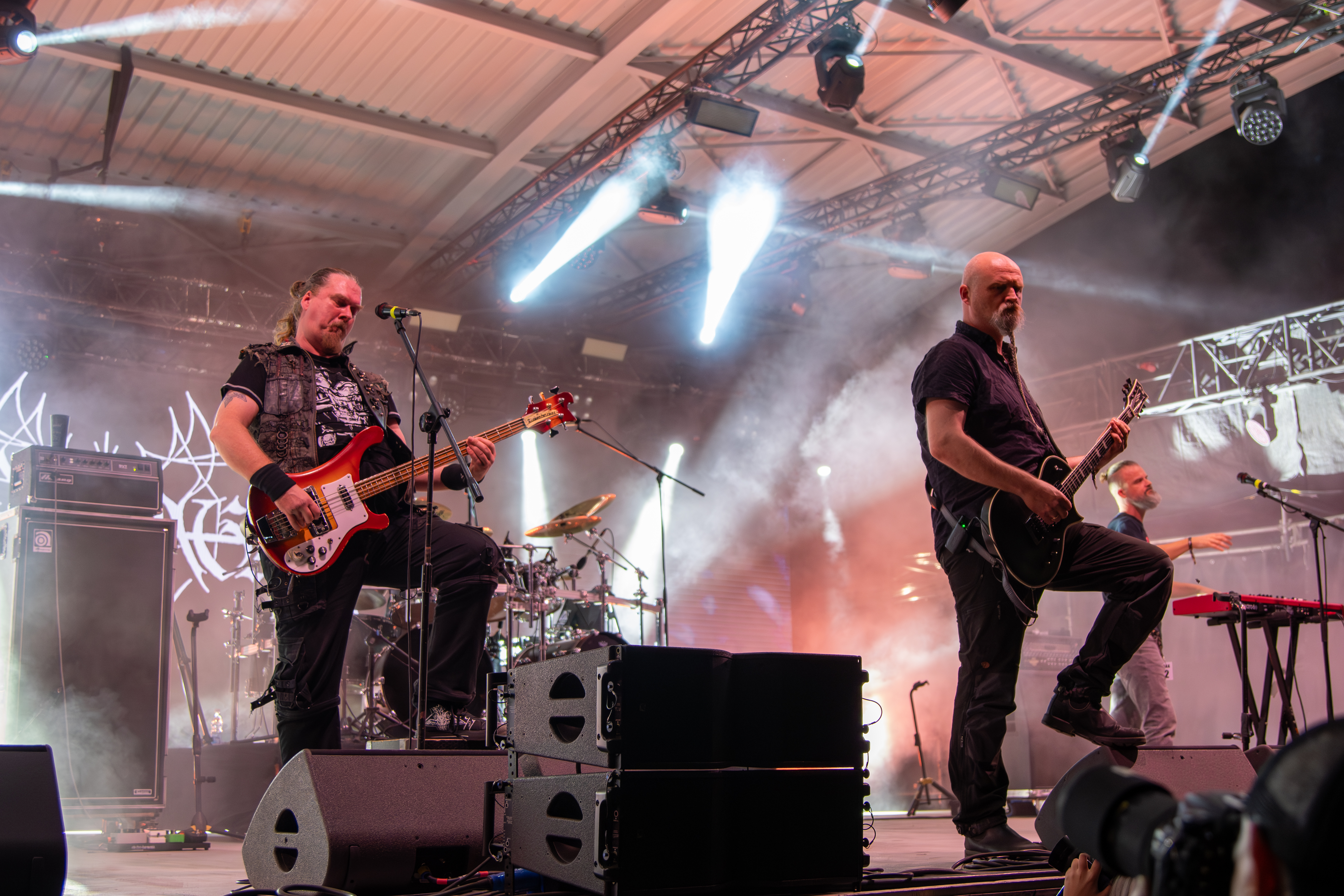
- Borknagar performing in 2024

Background information
- Origin: Bergen, Norway
- Genres: Progressive metal; black metal; folk metal
- Years active: 1995–present
- Label: Century Media
- Members: Øystein G. Brun; ICS Vortex; Lars A. Nedland; Bjørn Dugstad Rønnow; Jostein Thomassen
- Past members: Vintersorg; Ivar Bjørnson; Erik "Grim" Brødreskift; Kristoffer Rygg; Infernus; Kai Lie; Justin Greaves; Asgeir Mickelson; Tyr; David Kinkade; Jens F. Ryland; Baard Kolstad
- Website: borknagar.com

Borknagar is a Norwegian progressive metal band with black metal and folk influences. It was founded in Bergen in 1995 by Øystein Garnes Brun as a black metal band before switching to a melodic and progressive style. Borknagar's lyrics deal with philosophy, paganism, nature and the cosmos. The band has released twelve studio albums.

== History ==
Borknagar was founded by Øystein Brun. Then a member of Norwegian death metal band Molested, he became tired of the band's brutal aspects. Brun formed Borknagar as a more melodic outlet, inspired by the Norwegian black metal movement and looking to push the boundaries of "traditional" black metal music. He wrote the music and lyrics and assembled an all-star group of black metal musicians, such as Infernus of Gorgoroth, Grim of Immortal and Gorgoroth and Ivar Bjørnson of Enslaved. When Garm of Ulver, Head Control System and Arcturus joined the project, it brought the band immediate attention. The band never recorded a demo. They asked for and received a record contract on Malicious Records on the strength of the lineup. Borknagar gained fans and received positive press attention. In 1999, Grim died. He was replaced with Justin Greaves, who left shortly after to be replaced with Asgeir Mickelson.

Borknagar has released twelve albums. Their self-titled debut album features Norwegian lyrics. Subsequent albums have featured English lyrics. The Olden Domain featured an instrumental track titled in Norwegian. Aside from Brun's lyrics, the band has featured lyrics by ICS Vortex from Arcturus and ex-Dimmu Borgir, drummer Asgeir Mickelson, keyboardist Lars Nedland and by vocalist Vintersorg from Otyg and his eponymous band. Bassist Jan Erik Tiwaz (a.k.a. Tyr) wrote the song "The View of Everlast". Borknagar has toured with bands including Emperor, Peccatum, In Flames, Morbid Angel and Cradle of Filth.

Borknagar released a lighter album, Origin, which is "an acoustic effort based entirely on the epic and progressive aspect of the band", according to Brun's statement on heavy metal website Blabbermouth.net.

In late December 2007, the band signed a three-album deal with the Norwegian label Indie Recordings. In March 2008, Asgeir posted an announcement from Brun on UltimateMetal forums, stating that Erik Tiwaz and Jens F. Ryland had rejoined the band, and they were aiming for a January 2009 release. In May 2008, Brun released another statement, announcing drummer Asgeir's departure due to "evolving differences in musical ideas and visions [...] The split happens in friendly manner and with mutual respect for the decision that he has made. He will remain a good friend of the band." American drummer David Kinkade, who had worked with Arsis and Malevolent Creation, joined the band.

In April 2009, the band announced their upcoming album Universal. The album, scheduled for a September release, was postponed to a February 2010 release.

In early June 2010, bassist Tiwaz left Borknagar due to "general disagreements", and ICS Vortex replaced him and Vintersorg on the upcoming tour.

Also in June 2010, the band announced their first tour of South America, with ICS Vortex on vocals. On 25 August 2010, the band cancelled the South American tour due to reasons beyond their control.

In January 2011, the deal with Indie Recordings ended, and on 28 March 2011, Borknagar signed a three-album deal with Century Media Records.

On 22 April 2011, the band officially announced the return of ICS Vortex on bass and vocals.

Drummer Dave Kinkade announced on his official Facebook page on 25 October 2011 that he had "mutually parted ways with Borknagar" and that he'll "be focusing 100% on Soulfly now".

On 22 February 2012, it was announced on Norwegian website Artisan that the new drummer for the band would be Baard Kolstad.

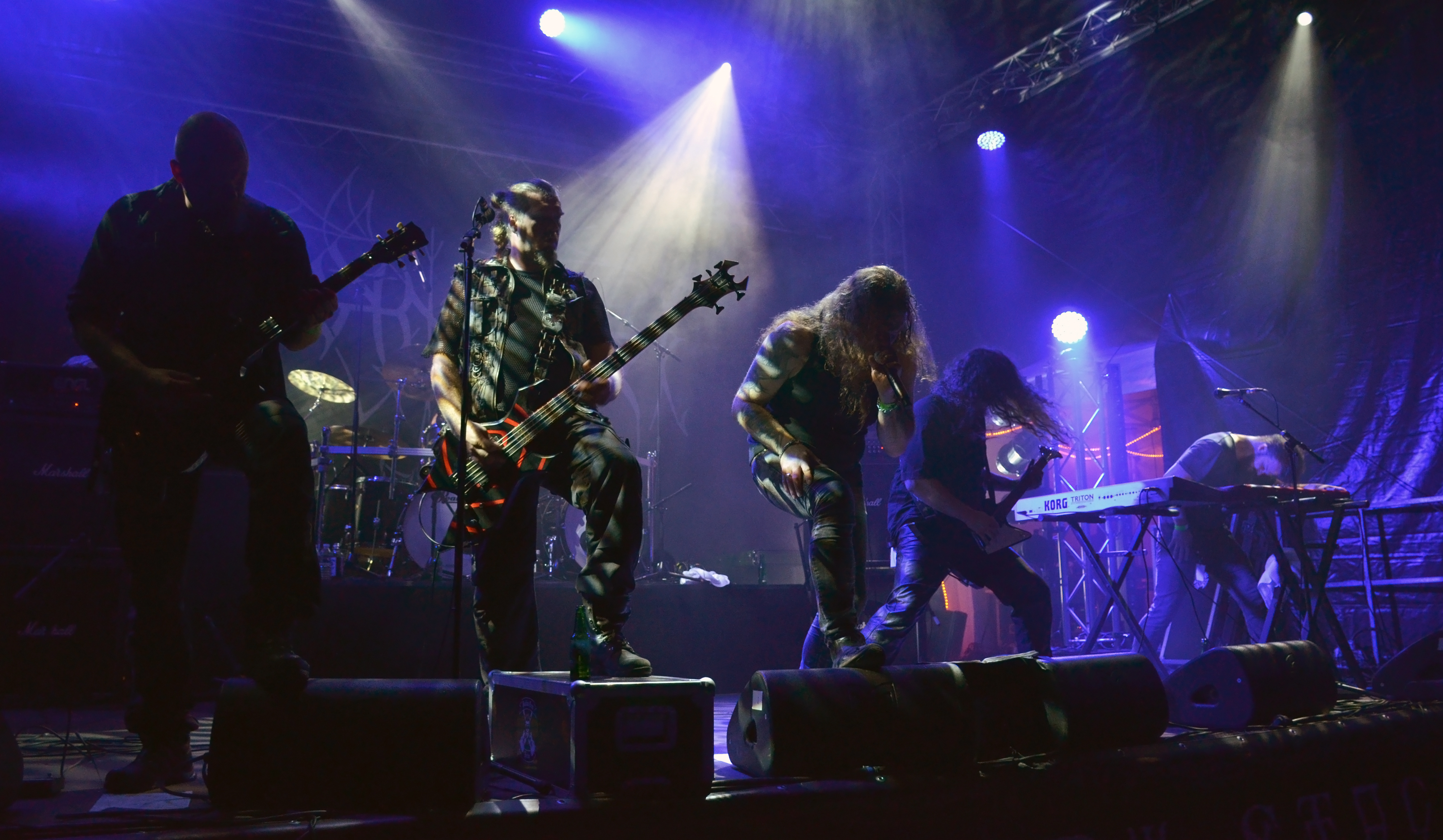
Borknagar performing in 2014

Throughout 2014 and into 2015, the band had been writing and recording their next full-length album, Winter Thrice. Production was delayed due to injuries vocalist Vintersorg suffered in late 2014, but the recording was concluded in June. Original vocalist Kristoffer Rygg guested vocals on the record.

In early 2019, Vintersorg left the band due to conflicting issues with his work and family, and the aftereffects of his 2014 injuries. The split was amicable and he did not ruled guesting on a future album. Drummer Baard Kolstad also left due to lack of time due to his other projects. ICS Vortex reassumed lead vocals, and Kolstad was replaced with Bjørn Dugstad Rønnow at Kolstad's recommendation. Borknagar released their eleventh album, True North, on 27 September 2019.

On 15 December 2023, the band announced that their twelfth studio album, Fall, would be released on 23 February 2024. They released lead single "Summits" with a visualizer video.

== Members ==
=== Current members ===
- Øystein G. Brun – guitars (1995–present)
- ICS Vortex (Simen Hestnæs) – vocals (1997–2000, 2010–present); bass (1998–2000, 2010–present)
- Lazare (Lars A. Nedland) – keyboards, vocals (1999–present)
- Bjørn Dugstad Rønnow – drums (2018–present)
- Jostein Thomassen – guitars (2019–present)

=== Former members ===
- Infernus (Roger Tiegs) – bass (1995–1996)
- Garm (Kristoffer Rygg) – vocals (1995–1997; session 2016)
- Ivar Bjørnson – keyboards (1995–1998)
- Grim (Erik Brødreskift) – drums (1995–1998; died 1999)
- Kai K. Lie – bass (1996–1998)
- Jens F. Ryland – guitars (1997–2003, 2007–2018)
- Justin Greaves – drums (1998–1999)
- Asgeir Mickelson – drums (1999–2008); bass and additional guitars (2003–2006)
- Tyr (Jan Erik Tiwaz) – bass (2000–2003, 2006–2010)
- Vintersorg (Andreas Hedlund) – vocals, additional guitars and keyboards (2000–2019)
- David Kinkade – drums (2008–2011)
- Baard Kolstad – drums (2012–2018)
- Athera (Pål Mathiesen) – vocals (2013–2018; touring/session)

== Discography ==
=== Studio albums ===
- Borknagar (1996, Malicious, Century Black)
- The Olden Domain (1997, Century Black)
- The Archaic Course (1998, Century Media)
- Quintessence (2000, Century Media)
- Empiricism (2001, Century Media)
- Epic (2004, Century Media)
- Origin (2006, Century Media)
- Universal (2010, Indie Recordings)
- Urd (2012, Century Media)
- Winter Thrice (2016, Century Media)
- True North (2019, Century Media)
- Fall (2024, Century Media)

=== Compilation albums ===
- For the Elements (1996–2006) (2008, Century Media)
