= Norrøn Livskunst =

Norrøn livskunst

Studio album by Solefald
- Released: 15 November 2010
- Recorded: Oslo Lydstudio, Oslo, Norway; Dub Studio, Norway; Toproom Studio, Lunner, Norway; Mezzanine Studio
- Genres: Avant-garde metal, black metal
- Length: 55:00
- Label: Indie Recordings
- Producer: Solefald

Solefald chronology
An Icelandic Odyssey (2006)	Norrøn livskunst (2010)

Professional ratings
Review scores
Source	Rating
Dagbladet	(positive)
Kerrang!	4/5 stars
Sputnikmusic	4.5/5

Norrøn livskunst is the seventh studio album by Norwegian avant-garde black metal band Solefald and their first album released through Indie Recordings.

== Track listing ==
All tracks are written by Cornelius Jakhelln and Lars Are Nedland. All lyrics by Cornelius Jakhelln, except where noted.

No.	Title	Length
1.	"Song til stormen" (lyrics by Olav H. Hauge from Glør i oska (1946))	4:56
2.	"Norrøn livskunst"	4:16
3.	"Tittentattenteksti"	4:14
4.	"Blackabilly / Stridsljod"	5:49
5.	"Eukalypstustreet"	9:24
6.	"Raudedauden"	3:11
7.	"Vitets vidd i verdi"	5:35
8.	"Hugferdi"	5:52
9.	"Waves over Valhalla (An Icelandic Odyssey Part III)"	6:27
10.	"Til heimen yver havet"	4:15
Total length:		55:00

== Concept ==
The press release for described the album as such:

With "Norrøn livskunst", SOLEFALD looks to the early 1900-century Norway, when a young nation zealously engaged in exploring its cultural roots. Writers, painters and composers rediscovered Norse mythology, the Edda and the sagas. Houses and buildings were designed in the Norse "dragon style" and decorated with medieval motifs. Sports clubs were named after Norse deities, and Snorri Sturluson's "Heimskringla" had a natural place in every home. Explorers went out to conquer the most inhospitable regions of the world. Some of that same madness is underlying in black metal: When others hunt for fame and fast money, leave it to the Norwegians to colonise frozen continents and old cemeteries. As Cornelius Jakhelln's saga novel "The Fall Of The Gods" states: "They called it evil. They called it True Norwegian Black Metal.

== Musical style ==
The album marked some minor changes in vocal styles from both members. Cornelius employed the aggressive style he developed on the albums prior to An Icelandic Odyssey and with his side project Sturmgeist. He also introduced a deep, nearly spoken word vocal approach not before heard with Solefald. Lazare's vocal arrangements are some of the most dense and sophisticated he's ever performed. The musical style covers a broad range, as is expected by now from Solefald. Aggressive extreme metal, heavily electronic passages and complex multilayered vocals. The album also features guest contributions in the forms of vocals, saxophone and guitar. The majority of the original lyrics with the exception of "Waves Over Valhalla" and a portion of "Stridsljod/Blackabilly" which are in English, are written in a 1917 variant of Norwegian called høgnorsk (high Norwegian), which is a conservative written language preceding today's much more common nynorsk (Neo-Norwegian).

== Personnel ==
Solefald

- Lazare – vocals, keyboards, programming, drums, percussion
- Cornelius – vocals, guitars, bass

Additional personnel

- Agnete Kjølsrud – vocals (tracks 3, 7)
- Benedicte Maurseth – vocals (tracks 1, 8, 10), Hardanger fiddle (track 1)
- Kjetil Selvik – saxophone (tracks 4, 5, 7)
- Vangelis Labrakis – lead guitar (track 6)
- "King" – "wah howls" (track 4) (Note: Actually performed by Chilihead/Egghead Prodz. King is a character that performs in the band Chilihead in Cornelius Jakhelln's novel Voguesville. The song "Stridsljod / Blackabilly" is dedicated to King.)

Production staff

- Endre Kirkesola – mixing
- Vangelis Labrakis, Stamos Koliousis – mastering
- Christer-André Cedergren – vocals, guitars, bass recording
- Asgeir Mickelson – drum recording
- Børge Finstad Drums – drum engineering
- Trine + Kim design studio – cover layout, design
- Sidsel Jakhelln Semb – band photography
