= Solemn =

Solemn may refer to:

- Solemn (album), an album by In Vain
- "Solemn", a song by Tribal Tech from the album Dr. Hee 1987
- "Solemn", a song by Arcane Roots from the album Melancholia Hymns 2017

== See also ==
- Solemnity, a feast day of the highest rank in the Roman Rite
