= Marlene Stewart =

Marlene Stewart may refer to:

- Marlene Streit (born 1934), née Stewart, Canadian golfer
- Marlene Stewart (costume designer) (born 1949), American costume designer
