= Kulsrud =

Kulsrud is a surname. Notable people with the surname include:

- Helene Kulsrud (1933–2025), American computer scientist
- Russell Kulsrud (1928–2025), American physicist

== See also ==
- Kjølsrud
- Kjelsrud
- Kolsrud
