= Return of the Sun =

1986 painting by Odd Nerdrum

- Artist: Odd Nerdrum
- Year: 1986
- Medium: Oil on canvas
- Dimensions: 106 cm × 157 cm (42 in × 62 in)
- Location: Private collection

Return of the Sun (Norwegian: Solen vender tilbake) is a 1986 painting by the Norwegian artist Odd Nerdrum. It depicts three young women, two of whom are twins, on a ledge surrounded by peculiar cloud formations. The women's mouths are open as they reach out toward a light source outside of the picture's frame. Their eyes are wide open but completely blank.

== Reception ==
The art historian Jan Åke Pettersson interpreted the painting as optimistic, seeing it as an expression of renewed vitality after the fall of modern civilization. Jan-Erik Ebbestad Hansen, a Norwegian professor of the history of ideas, also interpreted the painting's sun as a symbol for life and a new beginning. Barbara Vetland on the other hand, in her art history master's thesis, interpreted the painting as pessimistic, citing the overall atmosphere, the colour scheme, the abyss in front of the women, and the fact that they are blind and thus cannot actually see the light. "Therefore it is warranted to ask which sun Nerdrum has depicted", Vetland wrote, "Is it the life-giving, or the destructive? For Icarus' hubris, to move too close to the sun was imposed with punishment and downfall."

== Legacy ==
With the artist's permission, the painting was used as cover art for the black metal band Solefald's 1997 album The Linear Scaffold. It also appears on the cover of Corey Marks' 2000 poetry collection Renunciation.
