= Cornelius Jakhelln =

Norwegian musician and writer

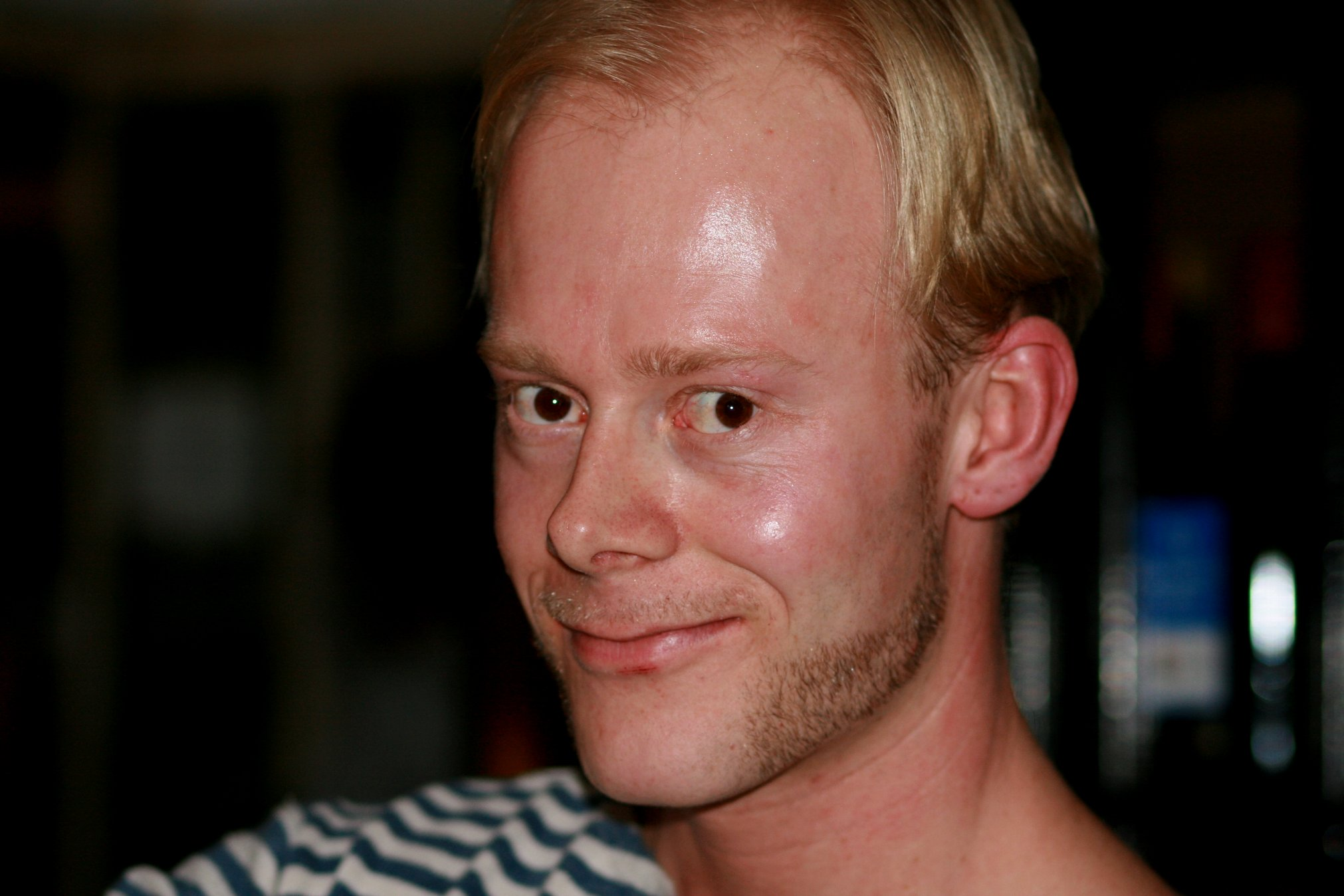
- Jakhelln in 2007

Background information
- Born: Arne Cornelius Arvidsson Brastad; 31 August 1977 (age 49)
- Origin: Norway
- Genres: Avant-garde metal, black metal, thrash metal
- Occupations: Musician, songwriter, author, poet, philosopher
- Instruments: Vocals, guitar, bass, keyboards, programming, sampler
- Member of: Solefald, Sturmgeist, G.U.T.

Arne Cornelius Arvidsson Jakhelln (born 31 August 1977 in Kristiansand), né Brastad, also known under the nom de plume Cornelius von Jackhelln, is a Norwegian vocalist, guitarist, musician, writer and poet.

== Biography ==
=== Musician ===
Born as Cornelius Brastad in Oslo to parents Arvid Brastad, an accountant, and Harriet Qvenild, a social worker, he changed his last to Jakhelln as an adult. He is currently residing in Berlin. He was 18 years old when he and Lars "Lazare" Nedland formed the avant-garde metal band, Solefald. Along with being a lead vocalist, guitarist, bassist and composer in the band, he also handles the vast majority of lyric writing for the band. Solefald has since released one demo and seven full-length albums. In December 2005, the band was nominated for the Norwegian Alarm award for best metal album for the album, Red For Fire: An Icelandic Odyssey Part 1.

Cornelius' first time recording with a band other than Solefald was in July 1999, when Cornelius performed guest vocals for the gothic metal band Monumentum for the songs "Black And Violet", a cover of the Italian band Death SS, and "The Colour of Compassion". These recordings were released in 2004 on the Monumentum compilation album, Metastasi.

In 2003, Jakhelln began working on a new band. The name chosen was Sturmgeist, and the band plays an experimental style of black/thrash metal with lyrics sung in English, Norwegian, and German about Germanic mythology, war, and recitations of Goethe poetry. On 24 January 2005 Sturmgeist released their first full-length, entitled Meister Mephisto on the record label, Season of Mist. Since then, Sturmgeist has gone on a small European tour, and had recruited two more official members, John "Panzer" Jacobsen on guitar, and Christian "Anti Christian" Svendsen on drums, ending the band's time as a solo project. Sturmgeist's second full-length, entitled Über, was released on 16 October 2006 through Season of Mist. His third album released under the Sturmgeist name was released in 2009, entitled Manifesto Futurista.

On 26 August 2005 Cornelius also announced on his official website that he would finally be recording an electronica album in Sofia, Bulgaria that he had been planning for six years. He has described the project as a combination of electronica, darkwave, hip hop, drum'n'bass and black metal.
The album, entitled My Only Drug Is Madness was released in 2007, under the band G.U.T, meaning Grace Under Torture. He got the phrase from a Thomas Mann short story entitled Der Tod in Venedig.

=== Writer ===
Aside from being a musician, Cornelius made his debut as a writer in 2001. He has had many writings published in newspapers and magazines and a tetralogy of poems entitled Quadra Natura for which he was deemed the winner of a national Scandinavian novel writing contest in 2007. The third volume of this four-book collection, entitled Fagernorn. Quadra Natura 0111 was released on 16 March 2006. He is also involved with a Paris-based literary review entitled Avant-poste, which was nominated for the French CNOUS annual award, as one out of ten cultural projects. He is also writing the libretto for a contemporary opera telling a story from the pagan times of the North. He has continued to have a successful career as an author and was quoted in an interview stating "Being a writer is my job. And my music is… It's like a "Nebenjob", as you would say in Germany. A passion."

=== Education ===
Cornelius has a master's degree in philosophie/lettres modernes from University of Paris IV: Paris-Sorbonne and a master's degree in the philosophy of cognitive science with a minor in aesthetics from the University of Sussex. He is currently pursuing a PhD in philosophy and cognitive science from École des hautes études en sciences sociales and a PhD in philosophy from the University of Oslo.

== Discography ==
=== With Solefald ===
1. Jernlov (demo) (1996)
2. The Linear Scaffold (1997)
3. Neonism (1999)
4. Pills Against The Ageless Ills (2001)
5. In Harmonia Universali (2003)
6. Red For Fire: An Icelandic Odyssey Part 1 (2005)
7. Black For Death: An Icelandic Odyssey Part 2 (2006)
8. The Circular Drain (2008)
9. Norrøn Livskunst (2010)
10. World Metal: Kosmopolis Sud (2015)

=== With Sturmgeist ===
1. Meister Mephisto (2005)
2. Über (2006)
3. Manifesto Futurista (2009)
4. Operation Zion (2017)

=== With G.U.T ===
1. My Only Drug Is Madness (2007)

=== As guest musician ===
1. Monumentum: sang on the songs "Black And Violet" and "The Colour of Compassion" on the album, Metastasi.

== Books published ==
1. Gebura Muse. Quadra Natura 0001 23 August 2001 at Oslo editor Aschehoug
2. Yggdraliv. Quadra Natura 0011 19 May 2004 at Oslo editor Tiden
3. Fagernorn. Quadra Natura 0111 15 March 2006 at Oslo editor Tiden
4. Gudenes fall 2007
5. Rikke gidder ikke! 2008 Cappelen Damm
6. Galderhug. Quadra Natura 1111 2008 Cappelen Damm
7. Vougesville 2009 Cappelen Damm
8. Trisyn 2010 Samlaget
9. Kosmopolis 2 November 2011 Samlaget
10. Raseri. En hvitings forsøk på en selvbiosofi 21 November 2011 Cappelen Damm
11. Umgangskrigen 22 October 2013 Cappelen Damm
