= Meister Mephisto =

Studio album by Sturmgeist
- Released: 24 January 2005
- Recorded: 2004
- Genres: Experimental metal, black metal, thrash metal, industrial metal
- Length: 46:02
- Label: Season Of Mist
- Producer: Terje Refsnes

Sturmgeist chronology
Meister Mephisto (2005)	Über (2006)

Meister Mephisto is the first full-length album by Norwegian experimental black/thrash band Sturmgeist, the, then solo, project of Cornelius Jakhelln. It was released on 24 January 2005. It is the 94th release by French record label, Season Of Mist. A live drummer was originally planned to be involved with the recording, but Jakhelln wound up programming the drums instead, making Meister Mephisto the first time Jakhelln released an album that was an individual effort after being a professional musician since 1995. In an interview for Nocturnal Horde, Jakhelln stated that the music on the album was influenced by living for a month in Weimar, Germany. In a press release for Blabbermouth.net Jakhelln stated, "It is no coincidence if Meister Mephisto has Germanic culture as its scene and source." In support of the album, Jakhelln garnered support from various Norwegian musicians, including drummer Asgeir Mickelson of Borknagar and Spiral Architect fame, and went on a European tour with Season of Mist label mates, Carpathian Forest.

== Track listing ==
1. "Ragnarok" – 3:50
2. "Shock & Awe" – 4:15
3. "Erlkönig" – 5:06
4. "Army Of Odin (Hafrsfjord)" – 7:18
5. "Master Hunter" – 4:31
6. "Rattenfänger" – 8:13
7. "Grimmer Than Ugly" – 4:48
8. "Walpurgisnacht: 1. Satz — Die Flamme" – 3:25
9. "Walpurgisnacht: 2. Satz — Meister Mephisto" – 4:36

== Recording Line-Up ==
- Sturmgeist (Cornelius Jakhelln) (Solefald) - Propaganda voices, martial instruments, all science & technology. The music and lyrics of Meister Mephisto all composed, performed and written by Sturmgeist.

== Lyrical notes ==
- "Ragnarok" poem adapted from the book Yggdraliv by Cornelius Jakhelln.
- "Erlkönig", "Rattenfänger" and "Walpurgisnacht" poems written by Johann Wolfgang Goethe.
- "Harsfjord" written by Ivar Aasen, adapted from Hornklove's poem in the saga of Harald Hárfagre.

Farther on in the Nocturnal Horde interview, Jakhelln went on to describe briefly the lyrics and concepts between each track on the album:

"Ragnarok: A poem about the end of the world, from my poetry book "Yggdraliv".

Shock And Awe: A song about the invasion of Iraq. It turned out in favour of the victims of the bombings when I wrote it, as I felt bad about the civilians involved. Still, the songs aim at capturing some of the tremor et stupor of such a massive military operation.

Erlkönig: One of Goethe's most famous ballads, sung and whispered in a dark forest ambience. A father rides with his young son through the forest, and the son is killed by an elf.

Army Of Odin (Hafrsfjord): Battle action from Hafrsfjord!

Master Hunter: A hymn to Jägermeister. I write about a giant cat in Schwarzwald, who hunts down hunters, and force-feed them Jägermeister!

Rattenfänger: This tells about the Rat Chaser, who seduces women and sing for gold!

Grimmer Than Ugly: A Western song, with epic landscapes and men who would kill for brandy or gold!

Walpurgisnacht: I love this song cycle. It talks about the pagan Druids celebrating the Night of Spring, with a mock attack on a Christian village. There is nothing more German on "Meister Mephisto" than these songs. "

== Guest vocalists ==
- Fuchs (Die Apokalyptischen Reiter): on "Erlkönig", "Master Hunter" & "Rattenfänger".
- Lazare (Solefald, Ásmegin, Age Of Silence, Borknagar, ex-Carpathian Forest): on "Ragnarok", "Shock and Awe" & "Army Of Odin (Harsfjord)".

== Trivia ==
The album's cover art is a parody of the Jägermeister label.
