= Djerv (disambiguation) =

Djerv is an early Cyrillic-script letter. Djerv may also refer to:

- SK Djerv 1919, a football club from Haugesund, Norway
- SK Djerv, a sports club from Bergen, Norway
- Djerv, old name of FK Jerv, a football club from Grimstad, Norway
- Djerv, old name of Bygdø BK, a sports club from Oslo, Norway
- Djerv (band), a Norwegian metal band led by the vocalist Agnete Kjølsrud
