= Kolsrud =

Kolsrud is a surname. Notable people with the surname include:

- Dag Kolsrud, Norwegian musician
- Dan Kolsrud, American film producer
- Eileif Kolsrud (1873–1953), Norwegian educator and politician
- Lasse Kolsrud, Norwegian actor and director

== See also ==
- Kjølsrud
- Kjelsrud
- Kulsrud
