= Arv =

Studio album by Ásmegin
- Released: November 28, 2008
- Recorded: June – August 2008
- Genres: Folk metal Viking metal
- Length: 42:18
- Label: Napalm Records

Ásmegin chronology
Hin Vordende Sod & Sø (2003)	Arv (2008)

Arv (Heritage) is the second full-length album by the Norwegian Viking / folk metal band Ásmegin. It was released on November 28, 2008 through Napalm Records.

== Track listing ==
All tracks by Ásmegin

1. "Fandens Mælkebøtte" (The Devil's Milk Pail) – 4:10
2. "Hiertebrand" (Heartburning) – 4:08
3. "Generalen Og Troldharen" (The General and the Trollhare) – 5:27
4. "Arv" (Heritage) – 5:40
5. "Yndifall" (Bereavement) – 6:38
6. "Gengangeren" (The Apparition) – 4:32
7. "Prunkende, Stolt I Jokumsol" (Pompously, Proudly in the Sun of Jokum) – 2:41
8. "En Myrmylne" (A Boggy Waltz) – 9:00

== Personnel ==
- Erik Fossan Rasmussen – vocals, drums
- Raymond Håkenrud – guitars, bass, vocals, piano
- Marius Olaussen – guitars, bass, mandolin, accordion, piano, mellotron
- Lars Fredrik Frøislie – hammond organ
