= Ásmegin =

Norwegian folk/viking metal band

- Origin: Jevnaker, Norway
- Genres: Black metal Folk metal Viking metal
- Years active: 1998–present
- Label: Napalm Records
- Members: Erik Rasmussen; Raymond Håkenrud; Marius Olaussen; Tomas Torgersbråten; Lars Fredrik Frøislie

Ásmegin is a Norwegian folk/viking metal band formed in 1998. The name is Old Norse for "Might of the Æsir" or "Might of the Gods". Ásmegin's lyrics are written in Norwegian, Old Norse, and older Norwegian. Some tracks on Hin vordende Sod og Sø are modeled after Peer Gynt by Henrik Ibsen.

== Current line-up ==
- Erik Rasmussen - harsh vocals, drums (2003—present)
- Lars Fredrik Frøislie - keyboards, piano, mellotron (2003—present)
- Marius Olaussen - guitars, bass, mandolin, accordion, mellotron, piano (1998—present)
- Raymond Håkenrud - guitars, bass, vocals, piano (2001—present)
- Tomas Torgersbråten - bass (1998—present) (is not playing on "Arv")

=== Former members ===
- Bjørn Olav Holter - vocals (2001—2003)
- Skule Jarl (Nordalv) - drums (1998—2001)
- Iving Mundilfarne - flute, guitars (1998—1999)
- Auðrvinr Sigurdsson - guitars, vocals (1998—2001)
- Anders Torp - drums (1999)
- Tommy Brandt - drums (2001—2007)
- Ingvild Johannesen (Sareeta) - vocals & fiddle (2003—2007)
- Lars Nedland - clean vocals

== Discography ==
Studio albums

- Hin Vordende Sod & Sø (2003)
- Arv (2008)

=== Naar Rimkalkene Heves ===
Naar Rimkalkene Heves is a demo released on September 1, 1999 by Valgalder Records.

Track listing

1. "Valgalder" – 4:54
2. "Alvesang Fager" – 4:12
3. "Over Havet" – 3:45
4. "Vargdans" – 4:18

Personnel

- Auðrvinr Sigurdsson – lead vocals
- Marius Olaussen – lead and rhythm guitars, synth, vocals
- Tomas Torgersbråten – bass, backing vocals
- Martin Kneppen – drums, backing vocals
- Anders Torp – drums

== See also ==
- Solefald - Another Lars Nedland project, Sareeta also played Violin on their albums, Red For Fire: An Icelandic Odyssey Part 1 and Black for Death: An Icelandic Odyssey Part 2.
- Ram-Zet - An avant-garde metal band where Sareeta plays violin
