= Agnete Kjølsrud =

Norwegian rock singer (born 1976)

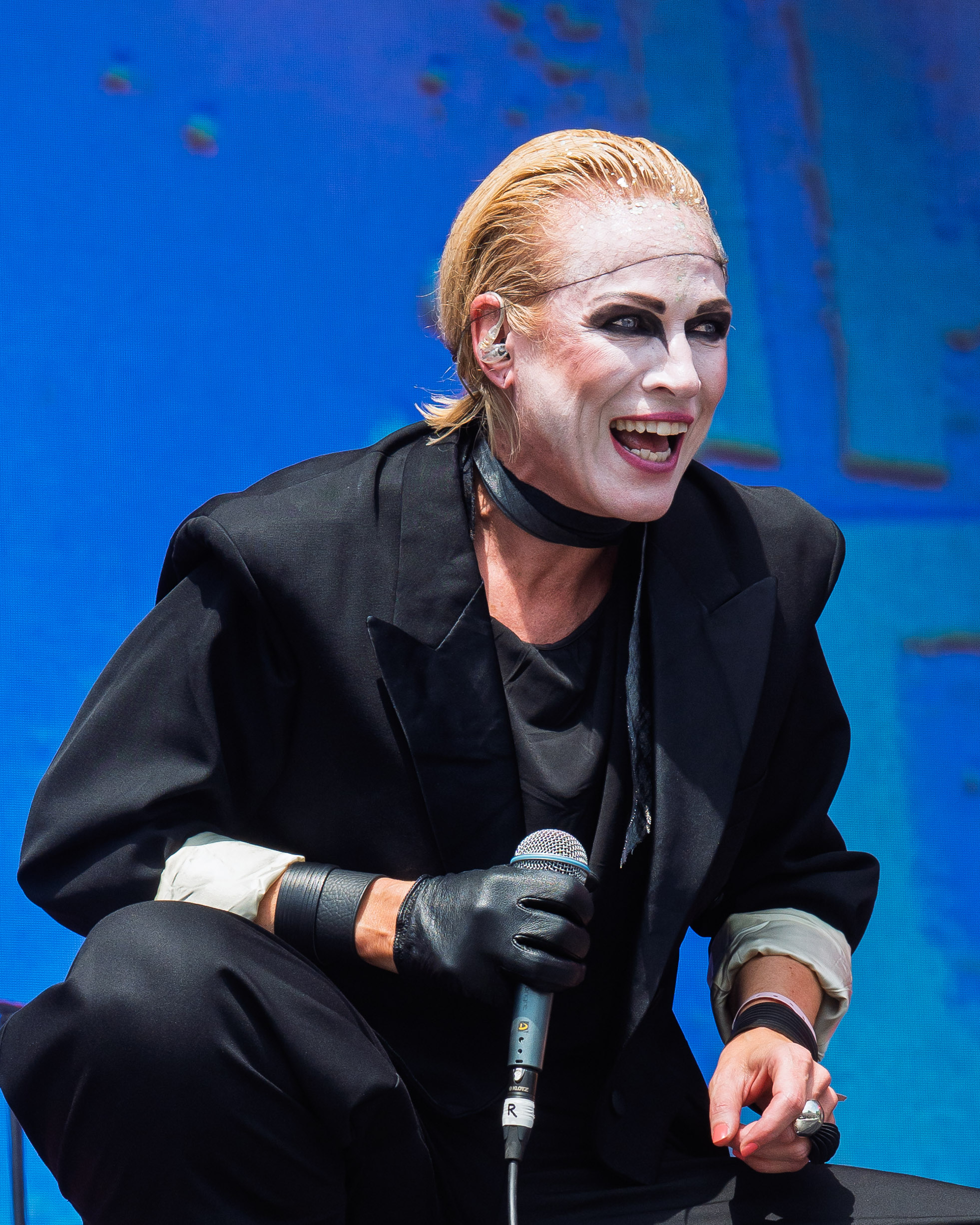
- Kjølsrud with Djerv at 2025 Tons of Rock, Oslo

Background information
- Born: 1 December 1976 (age 49)
- Genres: Rock, hard rock, alternative metal, symphonic black metal
- Occupation: Singer
- Instrument: Vocals
- Years active: 1997–present

Agnete Maria Forfang Kjølsrud (born 1 December 1976) is a Norwegian rock singer.

== Early career ==
Kjølsrud hails from Skjetten. Attending Lillestrøm Upper Secondary School, she sang local shows together with Ragna Nordenborg, later of The Launderettes. In the mid-to-late 1990s Kjølsrud sang in the rock band Pondus. She was also a guest singer for the electronic project Bermuda Triangle, as well as attending the Norwegian National Academy of Craft and Art Industry. Fronting her bands, she became known for wearing rococo attire, hairdressing and makeup.

== Animal Alpha ==
Kjølsrud fronted the alternative metal band Animal Alpha between 2002 and 2009. She appeared on the two albums released by the band, Pheromones (2005) and You Pay for the Whole Seat, but You'll Only Need the Edge (2008).

== Djerv ==
She was the lead vocalist of the hard rock band Djerv from its foundation in 2009.

Djerv released Headstone EP followed by a self-titled album in 2011. Wrote Metal.de, the "woman is clearly in charge" in Djerv; "Agnete has a voice like no other—unrestrained, wild, and a true fury on stage". The score was 8 out of 10, compared to 7 from Rock Hard and 9 from Powermetal.de. The latter wrote that "the strikingly attractive siren Agnete Kjølsrud rises to the top, dominating one of the most interesting female-fronted rock albums of recent years with her extraordinary voice". The album was "showcasing one of the most unusual and exciting rock singers at her best". Reviewing a Djerv live show, Metal Hammer Germany summarized: "It's no wonder that almost everything in the Norwegian band Djerv revolves around the woman at the front. Agnete has charisma. She's the antithesis of the doll, the sharp contrast to the corset-wearing gothic singers of the scene".

For the rest of the 2010s, Kjølsrud spent 7–8 years battling depression, while also bearing two children. She resided in Oslo with band colleague Erlend Gjerde.

== Other projects ==
Kjølsrud also collaborated with Dimmu Borgir on their studio album titled Abrahadabra, also appearing to sing the track "Gateways" live, and provided "wonderfully hysterical vocals" for Solefald on their studio album titled Norrøn Livskunst.

In 2013, she sang "Get Jinxed" for the video game League of Legends; its music video has over 100 million views on YouTube.

In 2024, she sang "Rebel Heart", a track featured in the second season of Arcane.
