= Mantra (In Vain album) =

Studio album by In Vain
- Released: January 18, 2010
- Recorded: July 2008–April 2009
- Genres: Progressive death metal, melodic black metal
- Length: 66:19; 74:24 (with bonus track)
- Label: Indie Recordings
- Producers: Endre Kirkesola, Johnar Håland

In Vain chronology
The Latter Rain (2007)	Mantra (2010)	Ænigma (2013)

Mantra is the second album by Norwegian progressive death metal band In Vain. It was released on January 18, 2010, by Indie Recordings. The album was recorded and mixed at the Dub Studio, in Kristiansand, between July 2008 and April 2009. The album was mastered in Strype Audio in May 2009.

The album was met with generally positive reviews and have currently a rating of 4/5 stars on sputnikmusic. There were released at special double disc edition with the bonus track "In Remembrance", which is a re-recorded version of the track first released on the "Wounds" EP in 2005. This album does not feature Even Fuglestad as an official member, but his contributions were credited as guest. Current guitarist Kjetil D. Pedersen was also featured as a guest on this album.

== Track listing ==
From Metal Archives.

All tracks are written by Johnar Håland, except The Wayfaring Stranger (trad.). Arranged by In Vain.

No.	Title	Length
1.	"Captivating Solitude"	7:01
2.	"Mannefall"	7:03
3.	"Ain't No Lovin'"	1:50
4.	"On the Banks of the Mississippi"	8:09
5.	"Dark Prophets, Black Hearts"	9:22
6.	"Wayakin (The Guardian Spirit of the Nez Perce)"	9:19
7.	"Circle of Agony"	9:00
8.	"Sombre Fall, Burdened Winter" (with hidden track "The Wayfaring Stranger")	14:35
Total length:		1:06:19

Special edition bonus track
No.	Title	Length
9.	"In Remembrance"	8:05
Total length:		1:14:24

== Credits ==
=== Band members ===
From Metal Archives.

- Johnar Håland – guitars, acoustic guitar, E-Bow & backing vocals
- Sindre Nedland – lead vocals & backing vocals (except track 3 and "Wayphearing Stranger")
- Andreas Frigstad – lead vocals (except track 3 and "Wayphearing Stranger")
- Stig Reinhardtsen – drums
- Kristian Wikstøl – bass guitar, hardcore vocals (on track 2,5,8,"In Remembrance") & backing vocals

=== Guest musicians ===
From Metal Archives.

- Endre Kirkesola – organs, synth pads, chimes
- Kenneth Silden – piano, organs, Hammond B3
- Kjetil D. Pedersen – lead guitars
- Even Fuglestad – guitars (additional)
- Kjetil Nordhus – vocals (tracks 1, 4)
- Jan Kenneth Transeth – vocals (track 3 and on "Wayphearing Stranger")
- Gil Silverbird – introduction voices, drumming, native flutes, chants, clean vocals (track 6)
- Hanne Kolstø – vocals on "Wayphearing Stranger"
- Erik Pedersen – trumpet
- Sebastian Grushot – violin
- Nemanja Markovic – cello

=== Production ===
From Metal Archives.

- Endre Kirkesola – producer, engineering, mixing, samples
- Johnar Håland – producer, engineering, mixing, samples
- Tomas Haugland – cover art
- Alexander Benjaminsen – photography
- Mantus – artwork
- Tom Kvålsvoll – mastering
