= In Harmonia Universali =

Studio album by Solefald
- Released: 24 March 2003
- Recorded: April–July 2002
- Genre: Avant-garde metal
- Length: 60:18
- Label: Century Media
- Producer: Börge Finstad, Solefald

Solefald chronology
Pills Against the Ageless Ills (2001)	In Harmonia Universali (2003)	An Icelandic Odyssey (2005)

In Harmonia Universali is the fourth studio album by Norwegian avant-garde metal band Solefald. It was released on 24 March 2003, and their last record released under the Century Media label. The album features lyrics sung in four languages: English, Norwegian, French and German.

== Background ==
Cornelius, the band's chief lyricist, stated on the band's website that much of the lyrics have Satanic undertones, and that it wasn't a coincidence; he believes that part of the formation of what metal is today is due to evil and the rhetorical figure of Satan, who in turn is praised on the song "Red Music Diabolos", claiming, "our crazy music has to come from somewhere."

== Concept ==
The album's themes are based on various philosophers and deities, all of which have a single song based on them.

As taken from the album's booklet:
"Ten songs, ten wheels of time
To be buried in the body,
Grave of the mind -
Chained to an infinite universe
Where night is the rule
Ten songs, ten pills
To make the known look unknown
And the ancient feel new -
Pills against the ageless ills
Ten songs, ten rites
To purify the spirit -
Demons talking hard
And demons talking soft:

First, Gebura, for justice
Second, Munin for knowledge
Third, Munch, for creativity
Fourth, Epictetus, for virtue
Then Dionysus, for pleasure
Sixth, Diabolos, for music
Seventh, the Virgin, for fertility
Eighty, the Prophet, for charity
Ninth, Odin, for protection
Last, for light, the sungod Apollon

Ten songs, ten stories of
Extreme music science -
Solefald proceed to play

In Harmonia Universali"

== Track listing ==
All lyrics written by Cornelius.

1. "Nutrisco et Extinguo" – 7:11
2. "Mont Blanc Providence Crow" – 5:16
3. "Christiania (Edvard Munch Commemoration)" – 8:20
4. "Epictetus & Irreversibility" – 5:58
5. "Dionysify This Night of Spring" – 8:12
6. "Red Music Diabolos" – 4:34
7. "Buy My Sperm" – 4:35
8. "Fraternité de la Grande Lumière" – 5:12
9. "The Liberation of Destiny" – 6:28
10. "Sonnenuntergang im Weltraum" – 4:32

In the album's booklet, the songs "Red Music Diabolos" and "Dionysify this Night of Spring" are incorrectly listed track five and track six, respectively.

== Critical reception ==
Professional ratings
Review scores
Source	Rating
Allmusic	4/5 stars
Blabbermouth.net	7.5/10 stars

Blabbermouth.net's review was favorable, writing, "in a mire of screaming pocket Satanists, Solefald offer a tangible break from the norm. That their desire for experimentation has previously led to threats from conservative black metal zealots must surely be recommendation enough for you to bend your brain around this album."

== Personnel ==
- Lazare – vocals, Hammond B3, grand piano, drums
- Cornelius – vocals, electric guitar, classical guitar, bass guitar, samples

=== Session musicians ===
- Kjetil Selvik – saxophone on "Nutrisco et Extinguo", "Dionysify This Night of Spring" and "Fraternité de la Grande Lumiére", choir vocals on "Christiana (Edvard Munch Commemoration)" and "Dionisify This Night of Spring"
- Kristian Krüger – choir vocals on "Christiana (Edvard Munch Commemoration)" and "Dionisify This Night of Spring"
- Sigurd Høye – choir vocals on "Christiana (Edvard Munch Commemoration)" and "Dionisify This Night of Spring"
