= Ænigma (album) =

Studio album by In Vain
- Released: March 11, 2013
- Recorded: September–December 2012
- Studios: Strand Studio, Kristiansand
- Genres: Progressive metal; melodic black metal; melodic death metal
- Length: 51:09; 57:03 (with bonus track)
- Label: Indie Recordings
- Producers: Jens Bogren, Marius Strand

In Vain chronology
Mantra (2010)	Ænigma (2013)	Currents (2018)

Professional ratings
Review scores
Source	Rating
Chronicles of Chaos	7.5/10
Metal Reviews	79/100
Metal Revolution	85%
Metal Storm	8.5/10

Ænigma is the third album by Norwegian progressive metal band In Vain. It was released on March 11, 2013 by Indie Recordings. The album was written in 2010 and 2011, recorded at the Strand Studio, in Kristiansand, between September and December 2012, and mixed and mastered in Fascination Street Studios in Sweden.

The special edition of the album contains the bonus track "Rise Against". This is the first album to feature guitarist Kjetil D. Pedersen as a full-time member, as he was featured as a guest on Mantra.

== Track listing ==
All tracks are written by Johnar Håland with co-writers listed.

No.	Title	Writer(s)	Length
1.	"Against the Grain"		7:05
2.	"Image of Time"		5:38
3.	"Southern Shores" (instrumental)	Kjetil D. Pedersen	1:59
4.	"Hymne til havet"		5:04
5.	"Culmination of the Enigma"		8:23
6.	"Times of Yore"	Andreas Frigstad	7:19
7.	"Rise Against" (bonus track)	Frigstad	5:54
8.	"To the Core"		6:27
9.	"Floating on the Murmuring Tide"		9:14
Total length:			57:03

== Credits ==
In Vain

- Johnar Håland – guitars, backing vocals
- Sindre Nedland – vocals, organ, piano
- Andreas Frigstad – vocals
- Stig Reinhardtsen – drums
- Kristian Wikstøl – bass guitar, vocals
- Kjetil D. Pedersen – guitars, backing vocals

Additional musicians

- Lars A. Nedland – vocals (track 2)
- Simen H. Pedersen – vocals (track 5)
- Audun Barsten Johnsen – B3 Hammond organ
- Cornelius Jakhelln – spoken word (track 5 & "Rise Against")
- Åge Jan Barlund – trombone
- Line Falkenberg – saxophone
- Jan Ragnar Storheim – cello
- Ingvild Anette Strønen Kaare – violin
- Charlotte Winsvold – trumpet

Production

- Jens Bogren – mixing, production
- Tony Lindgren – mastering
- Marius Strand – engineering, production
- Robert Høyem – cover art
- Jorn Veberg – photography
- Simen H. Pedersen – vocal recording
