= Currents (In Vain album) =

Studio album by In Vain
- Released: January 26, 2018
- Recorded: 2017
- Genres: Progressive metal; melodic death metal; black metal
- Length: 42:22
- Label: Indie Recordings

In Vain chronology
Ænigma (2013)	Currents (2018)	Solemn (2024)

Professional ratings
Review scores
Source	Rating
Louder Sound	3.5/5
Metal Revolution	75%
Metal Storm	7.8/10
Metal.de	8/10
Powermetal.de	9/10

Currents is the fourth album by Norwegian progressive death metal band In Vain. It was released on January 26, 2018 by Indie Recordings. This is the first album to feature bassist Alexander Lebowski Bøe and the only album to feature drummer Baard Kolstad, known for performing with bands like Leprous and Borknagar.

== Track listing ==
All tracks are written by Johnar Håland except where noted.

No.	Title	Writer(s)	Length
1.	"Seekers of the Truth"		5:10
2.	"Soul Adventurer"		5:09
3.	"Blood We Shed"		6:00
4.	"En forgangen tid (Times of Yore Pt. II)"	Sindre Nedland (lyrics)	6:26
5.	"Origin"		5:44
6.	"As the Black Horde Storms"		6:35
7.	"Standing on the Ground of Mammoths"		7:20
Total length:			42:25

== Credits ==
In Vain

- Andreas Frigstad – harsh vocals
- Sindre Nedland – clean vocals, additional harsh vocals, organ, piano
- Johnar Håland – guitars, synths, backing vocals
- Kjetil D. Pedersen – guitars
- Alexander Lebowski Bøe – bass
- Baard Kolstad – drums

Additional musicians

- Simen H. Pedersen – vocals (tracks 1 and 8)
- Kristian Wikstøl – vocals (tracks 2 and 3)
- Matt Heafy – vocals (track 2)
- Audun Barsten Johnsen – B3 Hammond organ, church organ
- Line Falkenberg – saxophone
- Ingeborg Skomedal Torvanger – cello
- Magnhild Skomedal Torvanger – violin, viola

Production

- Jens Bogren – mixing, mastering
- Marius Strand – vocal recording
- Thomas Wang – drum recording
- Costin Chioreanu – cover design
- Jorn Veberg – photography
- Marcelo Vasco – layout
