= Neonism =

- Cover to 2007 reissue and later editions

Studio album by Solefald
- Released: December 7, 1999
- Recorded: Autumn 1998 at Sunlight Studios, Stockholm, Sweden
- Genre: Avant-garde metal, black metal
- Length: 50:11
- Label: Avantgarde Music
- Producer: Solefald

Solefald chronology
The Linear Scaffold (1997)	Neonism (1999)	Pills Against the Ageless Ills (2001)

Professional ratings
Review scores
Source	Rating
AllMusic	4.5/5 stars
Chronicles of Chaos	6/10

Neonism is the second studio album by Norwegian avant-garde metal band Solefald. It was released on 7 December 1999, through Avantgarde Music.

== Background ==
The album takes its name from a synonym for the word "neologism", which means a made-up word which enters everyday use.

The album's recording sessions were marred by a mixing console that caught fire.

=== Sound ===
On the sound of the album, band member Cornelius said, "The hard will be harder, the passion will be more passionate, the ecstatic more ecstatic." The band wanted to utilise a "true black metal production" sound, having it recorded at Sunlight Studios (home to many reputed black metal acts in the mid 90s).

The album expands upon their debut The Linear Scaffold by bringing a concept to the unique sound. It is in theory a black metal album, but contains many sonic elements and themes the genre usually does not touch on. The vocals by Cornelius and Lazare are different on this album than the first; though Lazare retains his clean singing and Cornelius continues his black metal screams/growls, some are delivered in a rap-like cadence and one song, "Omnipolis", is sung in French. Some songs feature keyboards and electronic sounds unlike those typically used in other black metal songs. Indeed, the album was so far from traditional black metal, the band received a death threat.

=== Lyrical content ===
Although there is some thematic continuity between songs, the album is not as strictly a concept album as some of the band's later works. The lyrics to the album focus on consumerism and pop culture, which is a departure from many metal lyrics. American and European consumption seem to be targeted, as there are countless references to many brands and consumer icons throughout the record, including Naomi Campbell, The Marlboro Man, Coco Chanel, Calvin Klein, Disneyland, Prozac, Tom Cruise, Special Agent Dale Cooper, James Bond, Jurassic Park, Visa cards, McDonald's and Michael Jordan. There are also references to philosophers and thinkers such as Charles Darwin, Karl Marx, Plato, Friedrich Nietzsche and Niccolò Machiavelli, as well as references to various religious allusions, such as Gaia, Noah, Sodoma, "Satanistan", etc.

== Track listing ==
1. "Fluorescent (The Total Orchestra)" – 5:20
2. "Speed Increased to Scaffold" – 8:27
3. "CK II Chanel No. 6" – 3:31
4. "Proprietors of Red" – 6:33
5. "A Motion Picture" – 1:55
6. "Omnipolis" – 5:36
7. "Backpacka Baba" – 5:24
8. "Third Person Plural" – 4:03
9. "04.34 PM" – 3:22
10. "The New Timelessness" – 6:00

== Personnel ==
- Cornelius – vocals, guitar, bass guitar
- Lazare – vocals, keyboards, drums
