= Hin vordende sod & sø =

Studio album by Ásmegin
- Released: 2003
- Genre: Black metal, folk metal, viking metal
- Length: 42:13 / 47:43
- Label: Napalm Records
- Producer: Børge Finstad; Marius Olaussen

Ásmegin chronology
Naar Rimkalkene Heves (1999)	Hin vordende sod & sø (2003)	Arv (2008)

Hin vordende sod & sø ("The Coming of Earth and Sea") is the first full-length album by the Norwegian viking/folk metal band Ásmegin. It was released on August 25, 2003 by Napalm Records to widespread acclaim. Album lyrics are written in Old Norwegian, Old Norse, and Latin.

== Track listing ==
No.	Title	Translation	Length
1.	"Af Helvegum"	On the Path to Helheim	2:46
2.	"Bruderov paa Hægstadtun"	Bride-theft at Hægstad-farmstead	3:43
3.	"Huldradans - hin grønnkledde"	Huldra-Dance – The Green-Clad One	4:07
4.	"Til Rondefolkets herskab"	Towards to Household of the Rondes	4:04
5.	"Over Ægirs vidstragte sletter"	Over Ægir’s Vast Plains	3:44
6.	"Slit livets baand"	Breaking Life’s Bonds	1:32
7.	"Efterbyrden"	The Aftermath	5:06
8.	"Op af bisterlitjernet"	Up from the Bisterli Tarn	3:41
9.	"Vargr i véum"	Wolf in the Sanctuaries	3:42
10.	"Blodhevn"	Blood Vengeance	6:19
11.	"Valgalder"	Age of the Slain	3:29
12.	"Efterbyrden II" (bonus track)	The Aftermath II	5:30
Total length:			47:43

== Credits ==
- Bjørn Olav Holter – vocals
- Marius Olaussen – lead and rhythm guitars, accordion
- Raymond Håkenrud – lead and rhythm guitars
- Tommy Brandt – drums and percussion, backing vocals
- Tomas Torgersbråten – basses, backing vocals

=== Additional musicians ===
- Lars A. Nedland – clean vocals
- Anja Hegge Thorsen – harp
- Oddrun Hegge – Langeleik (Norwegian zither)
- Lars Fredrik Frøislie – piano, mellotrons and additional keys
- Sareeta – fiddle, female chants and vocals
- Anne Marie Hveding – "wood-nymph" chants
- Børge "Smuldra Glans" Finstad – percussion on track 3
- Gunhild Førland – country flutes
- Nikolai Brandt – vocals
