= In Vain (band) =

Norwegian band

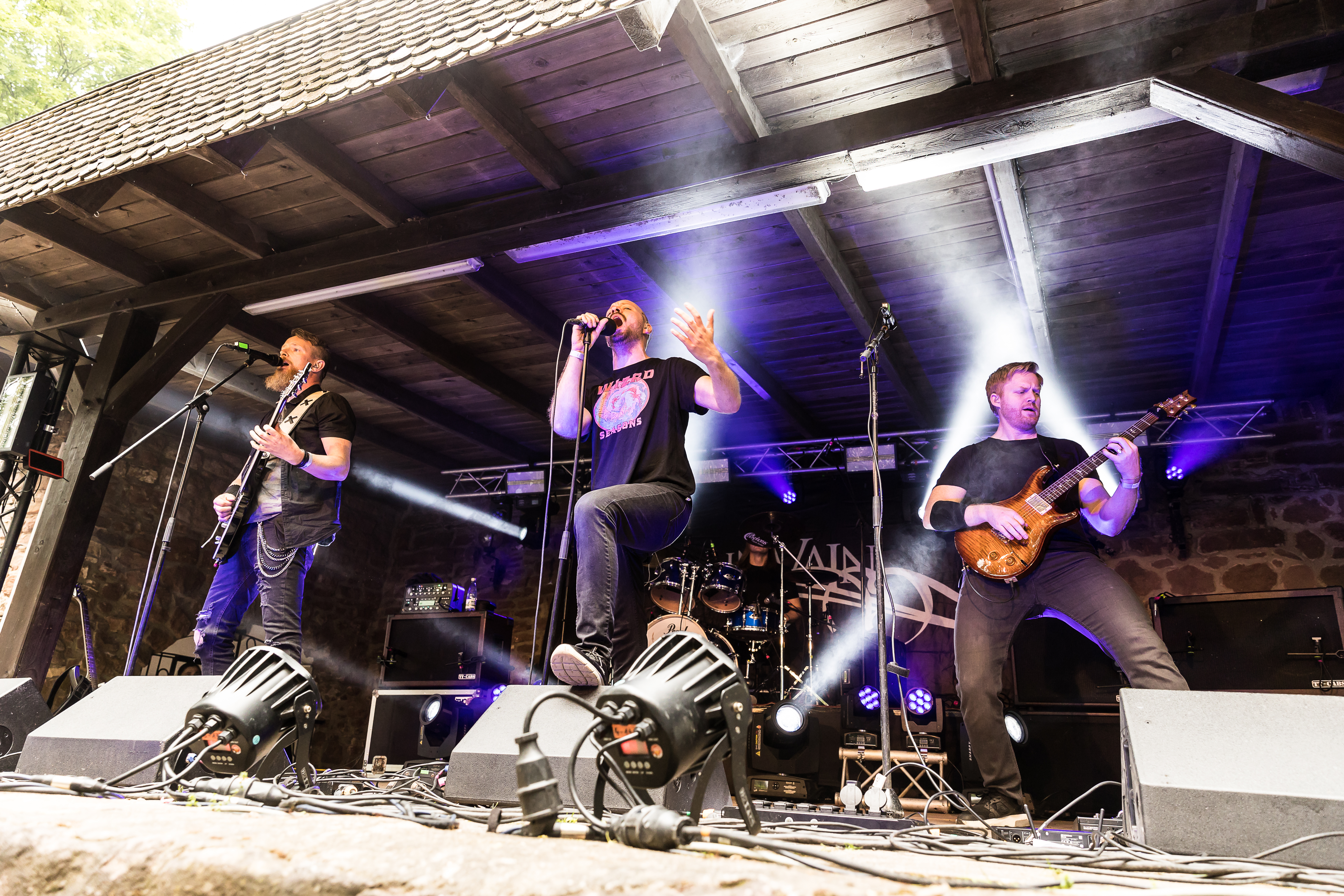
- In Vain at the Dark Troll festival 2025 in Germany.

Background information
- Origin: Kristiansand, Norway
- Genres: Progressive metal, melodic death metal, black metal
- Years active: 2003–present
- Label: Indie Recordings
- Members: Johnar Håland; Tobias Øymo Solbakk; Alexander Bøe; Kjetil D. Pedersen; Kjetil Alver Lund
- Past members: Sindre Nedland; Andreas Frigstad
- Website: www.facebook.com/InVainOfficial/

In Vain is a Norwegian progressive metal band from Kristiansand. The band has released five albums, and toured Europe with Solefald in 2013 and My Silent Wake in 2010. In Vain has also played concerts in Norway, and also played at the Inferno Metal Festival in 2013.

== History ==
=== Will the Sun Ever Rise? and Wounds (2003–2005) ===
The band was formed by guitarist Johnar Haaland and vocalist Andreas Frigstad in 2003. They were shortly joined by keyboardist and vocalist Sindre Nedland. In 2004 they recorded their first release, a three track EP Will the Sun Ever Rise?. The EP featured guest Joakim Sehl on bass guitar, while the drums were sampled. The following year, 2005, they released another EP named Wounds. This EP featured several guests, two of them being bassist/vocalist, Kristian Wikstøl, lending both his bass and vocal skills to this release and drummer Anders Haave. Anders joined the band shortly after the release, but was soon replaced by Stig Reinhardtsen. Their music had then moved in a more diverse and progressive direction.

=== The Latter Rain (2005–2007) ===
In late 2005 the band were then joined by bassist Ole Vistnes and guitarist Magnus Olav Tveiten, and began to write and record their first full-length album. The album The Latter Rain was recorded in DUB studio in 2006. Close to 20 guest musicians participated in the recordings, including vocals by Jan K. Transeth, Kjetil Nordhus and future bassist/vocalist Kristian Wikstøl. Guitarist Even Fuglestad replaced guitarist Magnus Olav Tveiten during the recordings, but were unable to participate on the record. Magnus still contributed on the record. The Latter Rain was released in 2007. Just before the band began playing live gigs they were joined by bassist/vocalist Kristian Wikstøl who replaced former bassist Ole Vistnes. They played live with Battered and Vreid on the Northern Brigade Tour in March–April 2007.

=== Mantra (2008–2012) ===
In the summer of 2008 the band started to record their second full-length album Mantra. Guitarist Even Fuglestad left the band on good terms before the recordings of the album. He still contributed some additional guitars for the album. Future replacement-guitarist, Kjetil D. Pedersen, contributed some lead guitars on this album. He joined the band before the tour for the album. It was released on January 18, 2010. This album saw a more diverse genre than the previous album, with two tracks being more in the vein of blues than metal. Sindre Nedland also utilized more deep growls together with his clean vocals giving more diversity to the music. The blues influence was almost entirely discarded on the next record. In 2012 several members of the band joined the live line-up of the band Solefald. Later that year the band got together to write and record their third full-length album.

=== Ænigma (2012–2014) ===
Ænigma was recorded in 2012 and released on March 11, 2013. The tour for support of Ænigma included three session musicians. The bassist, Kristian, decided to study abroad for two years, taking a break from In Vain, but with the intention to return afterwards. The replacement was Alexander Lebowski Bøe from Solefald. The drummer, Stig, was working in Korea and his replacement was Baard Kolstad from Borknagar, ICS Vortex, Ihsahn and Solefald. The guitarist Kjetil were shortly unavailable due to family commitments, and his replacement were Petter Hallaråker from ICS Vortex and Rendezvous Point.

=== Currents (2014–2018) ===
Currents was recorded in 2017 and was released on January 26, 2018. Two editions were released: the normal edition, with 7 tracks and a running time of around 43 minutes, and the special edition with 9 tracks and a running time of just over an hour. In an announcement on Facebook, In Vain have said "The album title, Currents, reflects on the colossal shifts and changes of our time. The present world is characterized by continental flows of people, traditions and cultures. Migration of people across continents and borders. Cultures merging. Dramatic shifts in lifestyle from one generation to the next. These are all currents - movements that distort old patterns, create tensions as well as new opportunities. These enduring shifts are some of the topics that In Vain addresses on Currents through a series of epic and monumental songs."

=== Solemn (2019–present) ===
Solemn was released on April 19, 2024. Later that year, Andreas Frigstad and Sindre Nedland left the band, the latter having been diagnosed with cancer for the second time. Kjetil Alver Lund started taking over for both vocalists in live shows. Nedland died from cancer on March 2, 2025. In Vain performed their first concert since Nedland's death, at the Dark Troll Festival on May 29, 2025.

== Members ==
=== Current members ===
- Johnar Håland – guitars, backing vocals (2003–present)
- Kjetil Pedersen – guitars, backing vocals (2010–present)
- Tobias Solbakk – drums (2018–present)
- Kjetil Alver Lund – lead vocals, keyboards (2026–present; live member 2024–2026)
- Sander Batuhan Tesdal - bass guitar (2026 - present; live member 2025)

=== Former members ===
- Andreas Frigstad – lead vocals (2003–2024)
- Sindre Nedland – lead vocals, piano, organ, keyboards (2003–2024; died 2025)
- Anders Haave – drums (2004–2005)
- Joakim Sehl – bass guitar (2004–2005)
- Magnus Olav Tveiten – guitars (2005–2006)
- Ole Vistnes – bass guitar (2005–2006)
- Stig Reinhardtsen – drums (2005–2017)
- Even Fuglestad – guitars (2006–2008)
- Kristian Wiktsøl – bass guitar, backing vocals (2006–2013)
- Petter Hallaråker – guitars (2013)
- Baard Kolstad – drums (2017–2018)
- Alexander Bøe – bass guitar, backing vocals (2013–2025)

== Discography ==
=== Studio albums ===
- The Latter Rain (2007)
- Mantra (2010)
- Ænigma (2013)
- Currents (2018)
- Solemn (2024)

=== Demos/EPs ===
- Will the Sun Ever Rise? (2004)
- Wounds (2005)
