= Pills Against the Ageless Ills =

Studio album by Solefald
- Released: 19 September 2001
- Recorded: July–August 2000
- Genre: Avant-garde metal
- Length: 46:09
- Label: Century Media
- Producer: Lar-Erik Westbye and Solefald

Solefald chronology
Neonism (1999)	Pills Against the Ageless Ills (2001)	In Harmonia Universali (2003)

Professional ratings
Review scores
Source	Rating
AllMusic	4/5 stars
Chronicles of Chaos	8/10

Pills Against the Ageless Ills is the third studio album by Norwegian avant-garde metal band Solefald. It was released on 19 September 2001, and is their first album under the Century Media label. It is a concept album, following the story of two brothers, Philosopher Fuck and Pornographer Cain.

== Background ==
=== Style ===
Much of the experimental concepts off their previous album, Neonism, was eschewed for a more straightforward, guitar-heavy metal approach, though still retaining quite a bit of the band's now trademark experimental nature. The style ranges from extreme black metal to jazz arrangements to traditional rock and metal. Vocally, Lazare is again over-the-top with his clean voice, while Cornelius' style can shoot from gravelly narration (a style used again on the In Harmonia Universali album) to black metal growls and screams. AllMusic described the album's sound as "a blend of progressive black metal, art rock and punk elements; kind of like early Cradle of Filth (minus the goth trappings) meets Angel Dust-era Faith No More, meets the Sex Pistols, if one can imagine such a combination actually working.

=== Concept ===
Pornographer Cain (1951-1998) is an American citizen and producer of pornographic films. He was observed at the site of Kurt Cobain's alleged suicide. Pornographer Cain is found guilty of Kurt Cobain's murder, and consequently electrocuted in the state of California in 1998. He is/was the brother of Philosopher Fuck (1943-1999), a former American citizen exiled in Europe, erring between various religious and mental institutions. Half monk and half performance artist, he gave his life to thinking. Exhaled from a French hospital bed in 1999.

== Track listing ==
1. "Hyperhuman" – 4:02
2. "Pornographer Cain" – 6:04
3. "Charge Of Total Affect" – 6:27
4. "Hate Yourself" – 5:26
5. "Fuck Talks" – 5:08
6. "The Death of Father" – 4:45
7. "The U. S. A. Don't Exist" – 4:49
8. "Anti-City Strategy" – 4:32
9. "Hierarch" – 4:56

== Credits ==
- Cornelius – vocals, electric guitar and bass guitar
- Lazare – vocals, synthesizers and drums

=== Session musicians ===
- Silje Ulvevadet Dæhli – violin on "Hyperhuman", "Pornographer Cain" and "The U. S. A. Don't Exist"
