= Über (album) =

Studio album by Sturmgeist
- Released: October 16, 2006
- Recorded: October 2005 – January 2006
- Genre: Experimental metal, black metal, thrash metal
- Length: 46:32
- Label: Season Of Mist
- Producer: Cornelius von Jackhelln

Sturmgeist chronology
Meister Mephisto (2005)	Über (2006)

Über is the second full-length album by Norwegian experimental black/thrash metal band Sturmgeist. The album was released on October 16, 2006 through Season Of Mist. This album introduced two new members to the band, John E. Jacobsen aka Panzer on guitar and bass and Christian Svendsen aka AntiChristian on drums, officially changing the project from a solo band to a full band.

== Track listing ==
1. "Meister" – 1:36
2. "Blood-Axe" – 3:03
3. "Dobermann" – 3:29
4. "Grimanic Guerillas" – 3:03
5. "Iron Hammer" – 2:40
6. "Party Über Alles" – 3:32
7. "Ruger" – 3:44
8. "Mephisto" – 2:20
9. "Triumph" – 3:29
10. "The Unknown Soldier" - 3:55
11. "London" - 3:25
12. "Enigma" - 4:43
13. "Rock Me Amadeus" - 3:09
14. "Hindenburg" - 4:24

== Recording Line-Up ==
- Sturmgeist (Cornelius Jakhelln) (Solefald) - Vocals, Electric Guitar, Bass Guitar, Orchestration, Programming

== Notes ==
- Sample on "Party Über Alles" from Nattefrost's Blood And Vomit.
- The thirteenth track, "Rock Me Amadeus" is a cover of the song by Falco.
