= The Linear Scaffold =

Studio album by Solefald
- Released: 12 July 1997
- Genre: Symphonic black metal, avant-garde metal
- Label: Avantgarde
- Producer: Roald Råsberg

Solefald chronology
Jernlov (1995)	The Linear Scaffold (1997)	Neonism (1999)

The Linear Scaffold is the debut studio album by Norwegian avant-garde metal band Solefald. It was released in 1997, through Avantgarde Records.

The cover art features Odd Nerdrum's 1986 painting Return of the Sun.

== Track listing ==
- All Lyrics by Cornelius Jakhelln, except where noted. All Music by Solefald.
1. "Jernlov" – 3:48 (Jakhelln/Lazare Nedlund)
2. "Philosophical Revolt" – 5:45
3. "Red View" – 5:20 (Jakhelln/Nedlund)
4. "Floating Magenta" – 1:42 (Jakhelln/Nedlund)
5. "The Macho Vehicle" – 5:00
6. "Countryside Bohemians" – 5:33
7. "Tequila Sunrise" – 4:17
8. "When the Moon Is on the Wave" – 7:24 (lyrics from a poem written by Lord Byron)

== Critical reception ==
Professional ratings
Review scores
Source	Rating
AllMusic	4.5/5 stars
Chronicles of Chaos	9/10

AllMusic chose the album as an "album pick" in their retrospective review, commenting that the album "showed right off the bat that they were a band with their own sound and vision." The album was featured on Terrorizer's "The Great Black Metal Albums Of All Time", with a number 30 showing. Reviewer James "Harry" Hinchliffe called it "a bold and wonderfully pretentious re-interpretation of BM, inspired as much by Sartre as Satan and careening dizzyingly between devastatingly concise black metal and poppy, blissed-out choruses."

== Personnel ==
- As noted in liner notes
  - Cornelius: Iron Law Screams, Linear Scaffold Strings, Bass
  - Lazare: Melovoice, Macrocosmic Keys, Tornado Beats

== Production ==
- Arranged by Solefald
- Produced, Recorded & Mixed by Roald Råsberg
- Mastered by Solefald & Morten Lund
