= The Latter Rain =

Studio album by In Vain
- Released: March 29, 2007
- Recorded: June–October 2006
- Genres: Progressive death metal, melodic black metal
- Length: 64:58; 69:11 (with bonus track)
- Label: Indie Recordings
- Producers: Endre Kirkesola, Johnar Håland

In Vain chronology
Wounds (2005)	The Latter Rain (2007)	Mantra (2010)

The Latter Rain is the debut album by Norwegian progressive death metal band In Vain, released on March 29, 2007, in Europe by Indie Recordings. The album was recorded at the Dub Studio, in Kristiansand, between June and October 2006, except from the Organ, recorded in Kristiansand Symfoniorkesters studio in Marvika, Kristiansand.

The album features a lot of guests, including producer Endre Kirkesola on organs, Jan Kenneth Transeth on vocals, and George Wright on spoken words. It gained a small, but positive, fan base and have currently a rating of 4.5/5 stars on allmusic.com and sputnikmusic. Some rare pressings of this record includes a bonus track "Epilogue: Alene" which was first released on their EP, "Wounds". Both bassist/vocalist Kristian Wikstøl and guitarist Even Fuglestad were credited as band members on this record, even though they were not a part of the band when the album was recorded. Kristian Wikstøl sang some hardcore vocals as a guest. This is the last and only album to feature guitarist Magnus Olav Tveiten and bassist Ole Vistnes.

== Track listing ==
From Metal Archives.

All tracks are written by Johnar Håland, arranged by in Vain.

No.	Title	Length
1.	"The Latter Rain" (instrumental)	1:45
2.	"In the Midnight Hour"	9:41
3.	"Det Rakner!"	8:27
4.	"October's Monody"	6:33
5.	"Their Spirits Ride with the Wind"	8:47
6.	"I Total Triumf"	6:04
7.	"The Titan"	7:09
8.	"As I Wither"	7:39
9.	"Morning Sun" (instrumental)	2:20
10.	"Sorgenfri"	6:33
Total length:		01:04:58

== Credits ==
=== Band members ===
- Johnar Håland – guitars, acoustic guitars & backing vocals
- Sindre Nedland – vocals, piano & organ
- Andreas Frigstad – lead vocals
- Stig Reinhardtsen – drums
- Magnus Olav Tveiten – guitars, acoustic guitars
- Ole Vistnes – bass guitars

=== Guest musicians ===
- Endre Kirkesola – B3 Hammond organ, church organ, arrangements
- Jan Kenneth Transeth – vocals, backing vocals (on track 2,4)
- Kjetil Nordhus – vocals, backing vocals (on track 2,3,4,5)
- Kristian Wikstøl – hardcore vocals, backing vocals (on track 2,3,6)
- George Wright – spoken words (on track 2,5)
- Håvard Kittelsen – trombone
- Andres Hofstad Søraas – lap steel
- Glenn Vorhaug – saxophone
- Henning Seldal – orchestral percussion
- Tore Bråthen – trumpet
- Sarah Høigildt – cello
- Ida Marie Sørmo – flute
- Cecilia Wilder – viola
- Hannah Wilder – violin

=== Production ===
- Endre Kirkesola – producer, engineering, mixing, samples
- Johnar Håland – producer, engineering, mixing, samples
- Peter in de Betou – Mastering
- Andreas Frigstad – art direction
- Øyvind Råmunddal – cover art, art direction
- Tor Erik Schrøder – photography
