= Hansel & Gretel: Witch Hunters =

2013 film by Tommy Wirkola

- Theatrical release poster
- Directed by: Tommy Wirkola
- Written by: Tommy Wirkola
- Based on: "Hansel and Gretel"
- Produced by: Will Ferrell; Adam McKay; Kevin Messick; Beau Flynn
- Starring: Jeremy Renner; Gemma Arterton; Famke Janssen; Peter Stormare
- Cinematography: Michael Bonvillain
- Edited by: Jim Page
- Music by: Atli Örvarsson
- Production companies: Metro-Goldwyn-Mayer Pictures; MTV Films; Gary Sanchez Productions; Flynn Picture Company
- Distributed by: Paramount Pictures
- Release date: January 25, 2013 (United States)
- Running time: 88 minutes
- Country: United States
- Language: English
- Budget: $50 million
- Box office: $226.3 million

Hansel & Gretel: Witch Hunters is a 2013 American dark fantasy action horror film starring Jeremy Renner and Gemma Arterton as the siblings from the fairy tale "Hansel and Gretel", who are now grown up and work together to exterminate witches for hire. The supporting cast includes Famke Janssen and Peter Stormare. It was written and directed by Tommy Wirkola.

In late 2010, after being approached by Gary Sanchez Productions, Wirkola pitched the film to Paramount Pictures. Renner was cast as Hansel in September 2010 whilst the role of Gretel was planned for Noomi Rapace before Arterton's casting in January 2011. Principal photography began in March 2011 at Babelsberg Studio in Germany, and concluded in June. Originally scheduled for release in March 2012, the film was delayed to allow additional time to shoot a post-credits scene with Renner.

Hansel and Gretel: Witch Hunters was theatrically released in the United States on January 25, 2013. It received generally negative reviews from critics for its weak script and gratuitous violence. It was a box-office success, grossing $226 million against a production budget of $50 million.

== Plot ==
As in the original fairy tale, Hansel and Gretel as children are abandoned by their father in a forest, where they come across a house made of candy. Upon entering it, they are captured by a cannibalistic witch, who makes Gretel prepare the oven while forcing Hansel to continuously eat sweets to fatten him up. The children outsmart her before she could eat them, incinerating her in the oven.

Over the following years, Hansel and Gretel have become famed witch hunters; although the incident in the gingerbread house has left Hansel with a magic-induced form of diabetes and he needs to inject himself with a shot of insulin every few hours. (Note: In Tommy Wirkola's original treatment, Gretel also developed an eating disorder, but that idea was dropped from script.)

Hansel and Gretel arrive in the town of Augsburg in time to prevent Sheriff Berringer from executing the young woman Mina for witchcraft. Mayor Engleman has hired the siblings to rescue the town's missing children, who are presumed abducted by witches. Berringer hires trackers for the same mission, hoping to disgrace the mayor and cementing his power. Hansel and Gretel capture the horned witch and discover that the witches are preparing for the coming Blood Moon, where they plan to sacrifice twelve children to gain immunity to fire, their greatest weakness. The mayor assigns Jackson, a local resident and tracker, to assist them in navigating the forest but they wait until morning before setting out.

The grand dark witch Muriel attacks the town with her army and abducts the twelfth child. She attacks Gretel who is rescued by Ben, a local teenager and avid fan of theirs who plans to become a witch hunter himself. Jackson is slain in the fight by Muriel after attempting to assist Gretel. Hansel falls from a witch's broomstick and is lost in the forest.

The next morning, Mina finds him stuck in a tree and takes him to a nearby spring, where she heals his wounds and they make love in the healing waters of the spring. Gretel is attacked by Sheriff Berringer and his posse, who beat her before being stopped by Muriel's troll Edward. He kills all of the men and tells Gretel that he helped her because trolls serve witches. Hansel and Gretel discover an abandoned cabin that they learn is a witch's lair and their childhood home. Muriel tells them the truth of their past.

Hansel and Gretel's mother was the great white witch Adrianna who married a farmer. On the night of the last Blood Moon, Muriel planned to complete the fire-protective potion, key to which is the heart of a grand white witch. As Adrianna's white magic was more powerful than Muriel's black magic, Muriel decided to use Gretel's heart instead. To get rid of Adrianna, she revealed to the townspeople that she was a witch. The angry mob burned her alive and hanged Hansel and Gretel's father, who had left them in the forest to protect them. Although Adrianna was a powerful witch, she'd never use her white magic against humans, even in self-defense.

The siblings fight Muriel before she stabs Hansel and abducts Gretel to complete her long-overdue ceremony. Hansel wakes up with Mina, who reveals herself to be a white witch. She heals him again and uses Adrianna's grimoire to bless his arsenal of weapons.

Hansel, Mina, and Ben disrupt the witches' Sabbath. Mina slaughters the witches with a Gatling gun while Hansel frees the children. Edward defies Muriel and releases Gretel. Muriel throws Edward off a cliff. Gretel finds Edward's lifeless body and manages to resuscitate him. Hansel, Ben, and Mina follow Muriel's trail to the original gingerbread house, now dilapidated and run-down. Muriel kills Mina before Hansel shoots her. The siblings engage her in a brutal fight that ends with them decapitating her with a shovel.

Hansel and Gretel burn Muriel's body on a pyre and collect their reward for rescuing the children. They head out on their next witch hunt, now accompanied by Ben and Edward.

== Cast ==
- Jeremy Renner as Hansel, the brother of Gretel and a witch hunter who takes insulin following an incident at a witch's gingerbread house that gave him a magical form of diabetes.
  - Cedric Eich as Young Hansel
- Gemma Arterton as Gretel, the sister of Hansel and a witch hunter.
  - Alea Sophia Boudodimos as Young Gretel
- Famke Janssen as Muriel, an evil grand dark witch who rules over a coven of dark witches. Unlike lesser witches, she has the ability to change her appearance into that of a normal human woman.
- Peter Stormare as Sheriff Berringer, the power-hungry and brutal sheriff of Augsburg who does not trust Hansel and Gretel.
- Thomas Mann as Benjamin "Ben" Walser, a teenage fan of Hansel and Gretel.
- Derek Mears as the in-suit performer of Edward, a troll that is in the services of Muriel. He serves Muriel and her coven, but befriends Gretel by healing her and becomes Hansel and Gretel's ally.
  - Robin Atkin Downes as the voice of Edward
- Pihla Viitala as Mina, a beautiful white witch who befriends Hansel and Gretel.
- Rainer Bock as Mayor Engleman, the mayor of the unnamed town that Sheriff Berringer works for
- Thomas Scarff as Hansel and Gretel's father who was hanged by an angry mob
- Bjørn Sundquist as Jackson, a tracker who is assigned by Mayor Engleman to assist Hansel and Gretel.
- Ingrid Bolsø Berdal as Horned Witch, a member of Muriel's personal coven with many horns on her head.
- Joanna Kulig as Red-Haired Witch, a red-haired member of Muriel's personal coven.
- Zoë Bell as Tall Witch
- Monique Ganderton as:
  - Candy Witch, the witch who lives in the gingerbread house
  - Hansel and Gretel's mother

== Production ==
=== Development ===
Blood and gore and action, all the stuff that I love ... It's definitely an R-rated movie, the first draft has a lot of blood and guts. First and foremost, it's an action movie, I think, with horror elements. And of course some dark humor as well. But the action and horror are the most important feelings I want.

— Tommy Wirkola (writer/director) in 2009

Hansel & Gretel: Witch Hunters is the first English language film and the first big studio production of Norwegian writer and director Wirkola, up to this point best known for his 2009 Nazi zombie-themed, independent, horror, and comedy film Dead Snow. Wirkola said he was contacted by producer Kevin Messick from Gary Sanchez Productions after the screening of Dead Snow at the Sundance Film Festival: "So my first meeting, my first day in Los Angeles] was with those guys and I pitched Hansel and Gretel and they loved it. And they took me to Paramount two days after and we sold it." In 2013, Wirkola said "I'm still surprised that they went for it, because it's a crazy, rock n' roll script. It's full throttle, there's lots of blood and gore and bad language, I often wonder how I got this movie made. It's all across the world now. But people really seem to respond to it, which is what we hoped, that people would enjoy this ride."

An announcement of Hansel & Gretel: Witch Hunters sparked a production of several other "Hansel and Gretel"–based films made by different studios, including The Asylum's mockbuster Hansel & Gretel, Syfy's Witchslayer Gretl, and Lionsgate Home Entertainment's Hansel & Gretel: Warriors of Witchcraft. The film was a part of an overall Hollywood trend of witch-themed films, including Beautiful Creatures (which stars Thomas Mann) and Oz the Great and Powerful, set to be released that same season. The project was given a budget of $50 million, co-financed by Metro-Goldwyn-Mayer (MGM).

=== Concept and design ===
I loved fairy tales growing up. I used to listen to them on tapes and "Hansel & Gretel" scared the hell out of me and it always stayed in the back of my head. I always wondered what happened to those characters.

— Tommy Wirkola in 2013

Wirkola said,

I have a strong memory from my childhood of just how dark and gruesome their tale was and I wondered what would have happened to the two of them when they grew up? They had this dark past and this intense hatred of witches. So as I thought about it, it made sense to me that of course they would be fated to become great witch hunters. We wanted it to feel like this could be happening 300 years ago but at the same time, there is a modern spin on all the action, characters and weaponry. It was a fun way to make a classical world feel fresh.

Wirkola said that he originally came up with that idea in 2007 while studying film and television at Bond University in Australia, when he wanted to make it as just a short film, and that the film school director Simon Hunter advised him: "Tom, don't ever speak of the idea again until you are in front of a Hollywood producer and I guarantee you will sell it."

Gary Sanchez Productions' Adam McKay said in 2010, "The idea is, they've grown up and they hunt witches. It's a hybrid sort of old-timey feeling, yet there's pump-action shotguns. Modern technology but in an old style. We heard it and we were just like, 'That's a freakin' franchise! You could make three of those!'" Dante Harper was hired to rewrite the script, aimed for "having a gory-but-funny Shaun of the Dead vibe." McKay said inspirations included Sam Raimi's early horror comedy films like Army of Darkness but also "John Carpenter's movies, which we all love [and] we're all hugely influenced by the first Matrix—obviously a really big one—also the Bourne Supremacy movies and the way Oliver Wood shot those. You kind of throw in all those, mix 'em up in a pot and that's what you get." Wirkola also credited Quentin Tarantino for influencing him "in many ways" and singled out Peter Jackson's Braindead for having been "a game-changer" for him.

It's got kind of like a steampunk vibe mixed with a little bit of a goth edge and hyper-cartoon violence like Kick-Ass and all set in a very specific world ... It's like a Sam Raimi-type horror movie, like Evil Dead II.

— Adam McKay (co-producer) in 2010

Messick said they designed "a fairy tale, mythological fantasy world" that feels like it happened long time ago but is not set in any particular time period. Marlene Stewart created the film's costumes, using traditional leather and linen but without an antique look. Its steampunk-like, retro-futuristic weapons were created by the weapon designer Simon Boucherie and Wirkola, who said they wanted Hansel and Gretel's weapons to look as if the characters hand-made them. Wirkola stated he "just wanted this crazy, mashed-up world where you can't pinpoint where it is, or when it is" and the modern elements are there to "add to the fun and tone of the film." He said, "We wanted the movie to feel timeless and for the movie to feel like a fairy tale, but still grounded. It was a lot of fun coming up with the different weapon designs and ways of killing witches. We mixed old and new elements. But no matter how modern some of the weapons are, they all have an old-fashioned feel and look like they could fit into this world."

The Stone Circle witches' looks were designed by Twilight Creations (Harry Potter and the Deathly Hallows). According to McKay, "the witches are awesome in it. Nasty, mean witches, and we'll get some great actresses for them as well." Wirkola said he wanted to reinvent witches as villains: "I do love Witches of Eastwick. We wanted to try to avoid the classical witch with the long nose stirring the pot. I really wanted them to be ... dangerous, fast – they're stronger than Hansel and Gretel ... It's a good basis for a villain." He recalled that "the most fun was finding their look and sound. For the main witches, we found one animal to represent all of them, like Muriel is a wolf. It just helped us find the witches. In some ways, it feels like they're the spawn of the dark places of nature. It should feel animalistic." Asked if he was worried about "this perception that it might be interpreted as sexist", Wirkola said, "For me, that's a classical villain from hundreds and hundreds of years ago. Yeah, I never worried about that, to be honest." He added, "People forget how truly dark and twisted those stories are. [The original "Hansel & Gretel"] talks about a witch burning alive in an oven, screaming and scratching." Ulrich Zeidler's concept art for some of the witches was released on the Internet.

=== Casting and characters ===
Jeremy Renner, who played the film's adult Hansel, has stated that his initial attraction came from a one sheet he was given even before seeing the script, showing Hansel and Gretel walking away and a witch burning at a stake in the background, which he found "incredibly interesting" (this scene was included in the finished film). He added, "When I read the script, my first thought was, 'I can't believe this hasn't been done yet.' It's such a great idea with so much potential. That dynamic was definitely a big thing, I loved that what Tommy [Wirkola] wrote left so much room for character." Wirkola said he wanted Renner in the role after seeing him in The Hurt Locker. Wirkola, who described Hansel as the "loose cannon" of the duo, gave him an additional character flaw of diabetes, in addition to the psychological scars that Hansel shares with his sister (in the original idea for the short film, Gretel was also suffering from eating disorder). Renner said it was a great escape for him "as this was a fairytale with no stress like the other action movies I'd done recently. I was having so much fun hanging on a wire like Peter Pan, hanging onto a broom and doing other crazy stuff." He stated, "That was one of the most fun jobs I've ever had because there's something magical about that old world, fantasy thing."

There's a lot of fairy tale stuff, but that fight is really real and bloody and quite brutal. Women are the villains a lot of the time. Not all the time. There are some horrible male villains as well. But I guess Gretel is very feminist. She's quite full on.

— Gemma Arterton (Gretel in the film)

The role of adult Gretel, whom Wirkola wanted to be "a really, really strong and fun female character," was originally planned for Noomi Rapace, who dropped out of consideration for the part prior to early January 2011. Diane Kruger and Eva Green were reported to also be in talks for the role. English actress Gemma Arterton was ultimately cast in the role. She impressed Wirkola with her performance in The Disappearance of Alice Creed, and, after they have met, with her "really filthy sense of humour" as "the humour is essential to this film." Arterton said she was attracted to Wirkola's "strong vision" for the film, calling it "very, very dark, and bloodthirsty and there's a lot of cursing. It's kind of got a Tarantino feel, really." Arterton described her character as "much more in tune with her spiritual side. Hansel is a typical action hero, cheeky, funny, a womanizer. She's much more of a thinker, intense, internal and bit more open-minded than he is." She said that Gretel is "a sexual character but she's not having sex with anybody, which is a change for me because usually in my films I'm sleeping with somebody!" She further explained the characters: "Hansel & Gretel have this unstoppable bond but they're also so different from each other. She's the brains of the operation. He's the brawn. He's the joker and the show-off. She's more the watcher, the researcher, the one who tries to really understand witchcraft." Arterton added, "Jeremy [Renner] and I found within the script moments where we showed the vulnerable side of them. Often in action movies, people are scared to put that in. I think it was important." She said that she "loved every minute" of the production and did not want it to end, also crediting it for helping her overcome her fear of getting hurt.

The role of the chief witch Muriel, described by Arterton as "the queen bee of witches", was given to Dutch actress Famke Janssen. Janssen too described the film as "Tarantino-esque", with "a lot of blood, gore and exploding witches." Wirkola said he had a crush on Janssen since he saw her in GoldenEye as Xenia Onatopp, "an amazing villain," and that in his opinion her being not only a good actress but also a beautiful woman who is "huge" and "menacing somehow" made her "a perfect combination" of "sexy and dangerous". Janssen said that at first the initial appeal was just money, but she quickly took a liking of the script and of Wirkola personally. She also thought the idea of playing an "evil to the core" witch "was appealing and different", saying, "I hadn't done anything like it ... A character like a witch feels like you would have so much freedom, because there are no restrictions as to what you can do." Later, however, she was constantly being distracted by the special effects work and felt that she "really understood the character" only in one part of the film. She found the time-consuming process of applying such makeup (taking three hours to apply and one hour to remove) "very strange" and also felt restricted and afraid of acting over-the-top in her witch role. In the end, she still had "a lot of fun" playing someone who is completely evil, and felt that it was "so empowering" to have "an inner witch to get in touch with once in a while." Janssen said the film might appeal to women and girls, too: "There's a brother and a sister story. And there's a romance in it too - but obviously not with the witch. Nobody falls in love with the witch."

Edward, a morally conflicted troll enslaved by Muriel, was voiced by Robin Atkin Downes and played by Derek Mears (Jason Voorhees in 2009's Friday the 13th). Mears was using an elaborate animatronic suit that he compared to "kind of like NASCAR where I'm piloting it but I'm not doing it by myself ... I think there's like five guys controlling the individual parts of the character. There's one person who does the eye brows, one person does the feet." Janssen, who could not "say enough things about Tommy [Wirkola]", said she was especially impressed at how he stuck to his specific vision and "fought" hard to hire a number of unknown European actors that would otherwise be unlikely to appear in a big studio American film, in effect making it a much more international production.

Several Nordic actors were cast in major roles, including Pihla Viitala, Peter Stormare (who Arterton said had actually inspired her to start acting), Bjørn Sundquist, and Ingrid Bolsø Berdal. In addition, actors from Germany and Poland (including Thomas Mann, Rainer Bock, and Joanna Kulig) and other parts of the world were also cast. Viitala, a self-described "big fan" of Renner, said she was nervous at first, but found him "extremely" easy to approach, made a good connection, and enjoyed working with him. Wirkola said Berdal was chosen for her "piercing" eyes, adding: "There are a lot of Norwegians in the film. Minor parts, but I knew I could get great actors in small parts and Ingrid has a great physicality." Stormare said he was only surprised at "how smart Tom [Wirkola] is, and how broad this fantasy is and the span of his imagination," his favourite aspect being how "some of the witches are so sexy and cool." He compared the film's production to being in Disneyland, saying it felt like a dream to him.

=== Filming ===
Wirkola said, "From day one, I was very clear that I wanted to shoot this thing in Europe. I really wanted that European feel of cold mountains, big forests, that sort of spirit was important to me. Luckily we did get to shoot it in Germany which is the homeland of the fairy tale. Shooting in natural outdoor sets is very important to me, compared to working on a sound stage." It took place in Germany, at the Babelsberg Studio in Potsdam-Babelsberg, in a filming location at an old forest near Berlin (production designer Stephen Scott said that he searched for and found what he believed looked like a "medieval forest" free of human interference) and in the city of Braunschweig in Lower Saxony. After the film was delayed to 2013, the crew did a "couple" of re-shoots, including "a little bit" in the deserts of California (filming the post-ending scene, an extended version of which was also released in a promotional clip "The Desert Witch").

Principal photography began on March 13, 2011, and concluded on June 3, 2011, using digital cinematography. Wirkola said, "Hopefully – you can see what I'm inspired by: Raimi and Jackson. Actually I'm a big fan of Steven Spielberg and the way he shoots action scenes. I think in a lot of modern action movies, it's hard to see what's going on. Shaky cam ... Hopefully what we strived for was to go a little retro in how you shoot action scenes." The film was shot in 3-D and its real 3D shots were done by lead stereographer Florian Maier and his team from Stereotec. Wirkola said: "We shot half of it in real 3D and the other half was post converted. Actually the 3D thing wasn't there in the beginning. It was something the studio suggested later on. We embraced it and I think it actually really helps in getting people into this fairy tale world." The filming process took three months. A 12-minute B-roll footage was later released on the Internet.

Stunt coordinator and second unit director David Leitch compared it to a "Jackie Chan hybrid of comedy and action." Prior to the filming, Leitch organized a month-long boot camp in order to prepare Renner and Arterton (who said she was also glad that at least she could use her prior training that she received while studying at RADA) with extensive weapons, fight and stunt training. Janssen said she enjoyed "flying", something that she always wanted to do, adding that despite her reputation as an action star it was the first film where she really had to do something physical (including suffering a minor accident on the set), because she could not use a double in the close-up scenes where she had the makeup on. During one of the scenes, where Gretel is thrown through a wall and falls down several meters, a stunt double for Arterton was dangerously injured when a nail got lodged in her skull close to the brain; Arterton said she initially wanted to do this stunt herself but Wirkola would not let her. Arterton herself suffered an injury when she sprained her ankle while running through the forest. Stunts for the more aggressive witches were done by New Zealander stuntwoman and actress Zoë Bell, who also portrayed the Tall Witch in the beginning of the film. Renner did practically all of his stunt scenes himself.

=== Visual effects and post-production ===
Most of it is all practical, even the witches flying on the brooms – it was pretty much all practical. They were all on wires, it was awesome! There's a scene [where] I come down around and literally there's 60 witches there. The rock structure was maybe 70 or 50 feet tall, it was massive, and I'd be shooting these witches and they'd just be flying off on wires.

— Jeremy Renner (Hansel in the film)

The film's visual effects were created using mostly practical effects, supplemented by computer-generated imagery (CGI) created by Hammerhead VFX for about 15% of the film's special effects, such as the transformations. Wirkola said: "I'm a big believer in just using CGI to polish what you get on camera. For me that's the ideal use of CGI. We have a troll in the film that is animatronic. I loved him. It took some convincing to get the studio along with the animatronic creature. There have been bad experiences with animatronics throughout various productions but I saw this company Spectral Motion. They did the Hellboy movies and I just loved it." Wirkola added: "I come from Norway where we can't afford CGI. But this is a fantastical world of witches and trolls and I wanted to ground the movie where I could. The blood should look real." Janssen, however, despite Wirkola's warnings, "was not entirely prepared for how involved and long that was going to be" and "actually wanted to burn the prosthetic make-up by the end of the movie." She recalled being "so overwhelmed by what this prosthetic business was all about", saying: "Acting has been so specific for me and what I've learned - eyes, facial expressions, all of that stuff - and with something like this, you're robbed of all of this. Or I could no [longer] rely on things I've done in the past. It was different and frustrating at times because I had this circus of people around me in case something became unglued." Muriel and the other principal witches were prepared by Mike Elizalde's Spectral Motion, who also created and handled the animatronic troll. Jon Farhat was the visual effects supervisor and aerial second unit director.

Conceptual design and production studio Picture Mill collaborated with Wirkola and Messick to create the title and opening credits sequence telling some of the early adventures of Hansel and Gretel as they grew up to become famous witch hunters. It was created with Stereo3D Toolbox through a combination of hand-drawn illustrations, practical fire effects and CGI animation. The digital color correction was supervised by Stefan Sonnenfeld.

Dead Snow is my love letter to [Sam] Raimi and this is kind of its own thing. In the beginning, they said go crazy. But if you go too far with the humor, it becomes spoofy and loses its impact. Too gory and it just takes you out of it.

— Tommy Wirkola in 2013

Janssen said the film is "definitely played with a bit of a wink and doesn't take itself too seriously." Wirkola himself described it as "a little more grounded" and action-centered than Dead Snow. He recalled that he has tried to downplay comedy elements: "If you go too far, it can turn into a spoof almost ... We shot a lot more than what is in the movie of course and it's just balancing it when you're cutting." Speaking of graphic violence, he said that "the first version we tested was for sure the most extreme. Some stuff stayed in, some stuff got cut out." By August 2012, Paramount was reportedly test screening two versions of the film, rated R and PG-13, and the R-rated cut received the positive feedback. Wirkola said, "I was afraid. I actually made sure they could never cut it to PG-13 ... We always knew it was going to be R." McKay said that Paramount's Adam Goodman "was perceptive enough to see the same thing and got behind it as well." Wirkola said, "The pre-production and shooting went very smooth, but the post-production was very new to me and how they do things here with testing and the studio." He said about the test screenings in particular: "I can see why they do it – there's a lot of money involved and they want it to hit as broad as possible. But I think it's a flawed process, I really do." McKay said that Paramount executives might nevertheless regret the film's R rating.

== Music ==
Hans Zimmer worked on Witch Hunters as an executive music producer. Icelandic composer Atli Örvarsson (co-author of Zimmer's score for Pirates of the Caribbean: At World's End) created the film score. Örvarsson had previously scored Season of the Witch so initially he was "a bit apprehensive" to work on another witchcraft film but was "too fond of the story to say no and found Tommy Wirkola's take on the subject matter to be very refreshing." Örvarsson found it easier to collaborate with Wirkola due to their shared Nordic heritage and said that their discussions about the music for the film "might have had some of the most cold and dark humor of any Hollywood music meetings."

The film's soundtrack, Hansel & Gretel Witch Hunters - Music from the Motion Picture, was released in MP3 format by Paramount Music on January 22, 2013. A physical soundtrack album was released on January 29, 2013, from La-La Land Records. The song "Bundy" by Norwegian rock band Animal Alpha is used during the film's end credits, but is not included on the film's soundtrack.

== Release ==
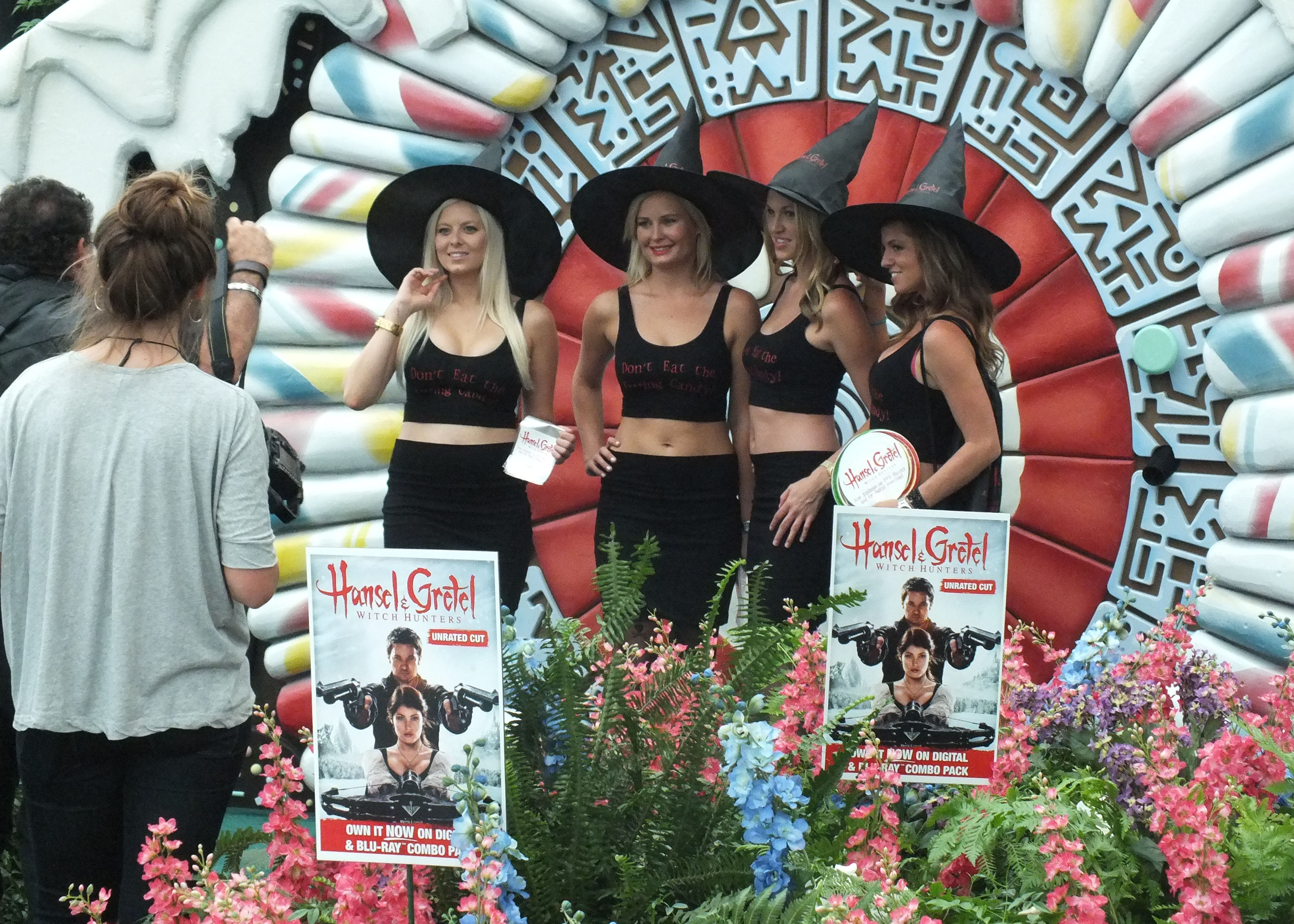
To promote the home release, "a full-size witch's house" was put on display at the Electronic Entertainment Expo 2013

=== Theatrical ===
Initially slated for a March 2, 2012 release, the film was pushed by Paramount Pictures to a ten-month delay for January 11, 2013. Co-producer Kevin Messick later said: "We'd finished it but we were still discussing adding a coda scene, which we were able to shoot. And there was always the consideration that Jeremy [Renner] had Avengers and Bourne coming out. So the studio made a wise strategic move in finding a good release date for us." Wirkola said that "the main reason is because they wanted to wait on Jeremy. He was cast before Mission: Impossible, Bourne and The Avengers. They wanted to wait until after those. I was, of course, disappointed then, but actually it helped because we came in under budget" and so the delay enabled him to re-add and shoot an additional scene that is set in the desert and which was cut from his original screenplay. The first trailer for the film was released on September 5, 2012.

The film was again delayed by two weeks to January 25, 2013, in the United States and Canada. A statement from Paramount suggested that the film was delayed to enable it to be released in IMAX 3D format. In early January 2013, illegal copies of the film were discovered in a major anti-piracy bust. Prior to its North American premiere, Hansel and Gretel: Witch Hunters was first released in Russia on January 17, followed by the releases in Indonesia and the Philippines on January 23, and in several nations across Latin America and South-East Asia on January 24. On the same day (January 25) it was also released in more countries of Latin America, with the other parts of the world following between January 31 and mid-March 2013. The film was also released in the motion effects theaters using 4DX and D-Box motion enhancement technologies. In Mexico, it was the first feature film to be shown in Cinemex's new X4D Motion EFX theater format, provided by MediaMation.

=== Home media ===
Hansel & Gretel: Witch Hunters was released by Paramount Home Media Distribution on June 11, 2013, in its original theatrical cut and an unrated cut with an extra ten minutes of footage.

Aside from additional profanity, gore, and sexual content, and a few extra lines, the extended version features a few extra scenes. In one scene, Berringer blames the Mayor for the witches' attack and murders him in public. The scene where Berringer and his goons assault Gretel is also extended; it occurs in between the scene where Mina heals Hansel and has sex with him, and shows that the men plan to rape Gretel right before Edward kills them.

== Reception ==
=== Box office ===
Los Angeles Times predicted the film would become a "box-office bull's-eye, with pre-release audience surveys indicating an expected $30 million for the opening weekend in the United States. One week prior to the U.S. release, the film opened to a "huge" $8.6 million in Russia (the all-time 50th best opening in Russia/CIS), which made its international prospects look good, according to Yahoo! News. Entertainment Weekly predicted the film would "likely top the chart in its debut weekend" with $17 million; similarly, MovieWeb predicted $17.5 million. Paramount said they counted on $20 million. Speaking on January 31, Wirkola claimed the film had so far "opened in 19 territories and went to number one in 18 of them." The U.S. initial midnight screening at selected theaters made an estimated $500,000, a "so-so result". The film took the top position on its first day's screening at 3,373 locations across the country, earning an estimated $6 million and suggesting a three-day total of $15–17 million, according to various estimates.

The film topped the weekend's North American box office with $19 million, the first day's under performance blamed on bad weather on the U.S. East Coast. In addition, it earned $25 million in several other territories where it had already been released (representing about 40% of the international market). However, it held well during its box office run, dropping only 52% in its second weekend and 39% in its third and fourth. On March 19, Reuters reported that while the film "was no blockbuster in the United States", it was much better received in other countries for a $205.9 million total haul to date, including $24.1 million in Brazil, $19 million in Russia, $14 million in Mexico and $12.8 million in Germany. The film's theatrical run ended on April 25, with a total gross of $225.7 million including $55.7 million domestically.

Hansel and Gretel: Witch Hunters was Paramount's fourth highest-grossing film of 2013, following new graphic novel and franchise entries: World War Z, Star Trek Into Darkness, and G.I. Joe: Retaliation, respectively. It is estimated that, following published production costs, marketing and advertising fees, and the percentage of international revenue that was lost by the domestic studio, similar fantasy reboots such as Snow White and the Huntsman, Mirror, Mirror, Jack the Giant Slayer, Abraham Lincoln: Vampire Hunter, and I, Frankenstein fail to match the total studio winnings for Hansel and Gretel: Witch Hunters, which makes it one of the most financially successful films of the fantasy-reboot genre, despite having the smallest estimated budget and lowest Metacritic score of the recent entries.

=== Critical response ===
If the very title has you rolling your eyes, don't even bother. If, however, it makes you think you'd like to see the further adventures of the fairy tale characters, by all means, take a chance.

— Daniel M. Kimmel

On review aggregator website Rotten Tomatoes, the film holds an approval rating of 17% based on 144 reviews, with an average rating of 4.20/10. The site's critical consensus reads, "Alternately bloody and silly, Hansel & Gretel: Witch Hunters fails as both a fantasy adventure and as a parody of same." On Metacritic, the film has a score of 23 out of 100 based on 25 critics, indicating "generally unfavorable" reviews. Audiences polled by CinemaScore gave the film an average grade of "B" on an A+ to F scale.

Claudia Puig of USA Today wrote "this convoluted hybrid of fairy tale and fantasy/action/comedy/horror aims for campy fun, but comes off tedious and blood-spattered." Andrew Barker of Variety called the film "inconsistently acted, and somehow both underwritten and overplotted," and while the action is "frequent and competently staged," it might feel too repetitive "as yet another witch is ripped apart limb from limb, sending yet another wave of viscera sluicing toward the camera." Similarly, Stephanie Merry of The Washington Post wrote that "after a while it's easy to become numb to the repulsive sights and bored by action that once seemed intense and exciting" in this "rarely funny spoof that's heavy on bone-crushing and blood-gushing," giving it one-and-half star out of four. Steven Farber of The Hollywood Reporter wrote a scathing review, saying that while "Wirkola makes the most of the 3D technology", "the film is too fanciful to be truly revolting" for its gore effects and "despite its few wry jokes, the script is awfully thin." Roger Moore of The Charlotte Observer gave the film one-and-a-half out of four stars, writing that Wirkola "focuses on the fights and flings all manner of viscera at the 3-D camera as limbs are whacked off and heads and torsos explode. Less attention was paid to the story, and the dialogue is a tad over-reliant on the random f-word to land a laugh." Kat Murphy of MSN gave it one star out of four, comparing this "big-budget faux fairy tale about skanky witches" to a "downscale video game for dull-eyed teens happy to lap up lame wisecracks and lots of gore." According to Vulture's Bilge Ebiri, "if the similarly situated Abraham Lincoln: Vampire Hunter took itself too seriously, the problem with Hansel & Gretel is that it doesn't quite take itself seriously enough." Keith Staskiewicz of Entertainment Weekly gave the film a C−, calling it "an intermittently fun, but overexcited and predictable mish-mash." Alicia Malone of IGN rated it a 4.5/10, stating "there are a few funny moments, but overall Hansel and Gretel: Witch Hunters is too similar to many films we've seen before." Calum Marsh of Slant Magazine lambasted the film's "sub-Tim Burton aesthetic" and wrote that "the result suggests A Knight's Tale as penned by Seth MacFarlane," giving it zero out of four stars. Scott A. Gray of Exclaim! praised some elements of the film, such as "lush and colourful art design that recalls a Guillermo del Toro production, sound creature makeup and special effects, decently choreographed action scenes and a pair of leads who do their damnedest to sell the limp script", giving it a score of 4/10. Chris Knight of The Vancouver Sun called it a "mess of a fairy tale", expecting "a wiccan outcry at the film's depiction — nay, endorsement — of the torture of witch-folk." Liam Lacey of The Globe and Mail gave it one star out of four, concerned how it "has an alarming number of females being strung up, burned, shot, decapitated and eviscerated."

Some reception of the film was more positive. Michael Gingold of Fangoria gave it two-and-half out of four skulls, while Jonathan Barkan of Bloody Disgusting gave it four out of five skulls, stating it "isn't a movie meant to scare or make you think but it is one of the most entertaining and enjoyable movies of its kind that I've seen in years." Scott Weinberg of FEARnet wrote that "aside from some very clunky editorial missteps in the film's second half, there's a good deal of wit, enthusiasm, energy, and amusing attitude to be found in the dumb-yet-self-aware Hansel & Gretel: Witch Hunters," all while noting that he is "not the type to act snobbish around a ridiculous film that obviously knows it's ridiculous." According to Ryan Larson of Shock Till You Drop, the film "is a mixed bag" but "fortunately, the lows don't appear as often as you would think," and, "if taken at face value, Hansel & Gretel is well worth the view." William Bibbiani of CraveOnline, who criticized the film's inadequately "limp" marketing campaign, found the movie itself "inherently stupid" but in a good way, "played with humor, ultraviolence and anachronistic fetish." Cinema Blend's Sean O'Connell stated that the film is "often mean and nasty, but that's really its saving grace." Peter Paras of E! recommended this "super violent, pretty funny flick" for how it "revels in the mayhem". Tom Russo of The Boston Globe, giving the film three out of five stars, called it a "splattery fanboy fun. Preposterous, clearly, but fun." Jonathon Natsis of Filmink wrote: "Hansel and Gretel is not a 'film'. It's a 'movie', in all its unabashed, excitable glory ... big on blood-soaked entertainment and low on pretension." Rick Florino of Artistdirect gave it four out of five stars, stating: "This has all the elements of a classic action flick, and it's destined for cult status. Welcome to the most fun movie of 2013." DVD Talk's Jamie S. Rich summed up: "Is Hansel and Gretel: Witch Hunters a good movie? Probably not. At least not in any way that is defensible by regular critical standards. Is it a hell of a good time? Absolutely so. Unabashedly so. That's all it wants to be."

Neil Geinzlinger of The New York Times wrote that "it may not stay in the public eye long because this movie is probably not going to put up Twilight-like numbers," adding that "the script doesn't give them enough of the witty lines that can elevate these types of movies to must-see status, which is odd, since the producers include Will Ferrell." Vince Horiuchi of The Salt Lake Tribune suggested that this film should have been made 30 years ago by Sam Raimi and starring Bruce Campbell, while instead "the Hansel and Gretel we're left with runs out of its magic potion far too early to let us enjoy its wicked possibilities." A more positive comparison to Raimi and Campbell's Army of Darkness was made by Pete Vonder Haar of the Houston Press, who gave it three out of five "witch hazels" and wrote: "I'm not sure if witches are the next vampires/zombies, or if the hinted-at franchise potential has any legs, but this was a perfectly vulgar way to spend 90 minutes." Tim Grierson of Screen International wrote that Hansel and Gretel "works best as an unapologetic B-movie action flick" and "feels like a first film in a franchise that's meant to set up the main characters and conflicts, which can then be fleshed out in sequels" but "the problem is that there isn't enough here to warrant a return trip to this semi-magical land." Richard Corliss of TIME agreed with this sentiment, stating that "one might be enough — too much, for some tastes."

=== Cult status ===
At the conclusion of 2013, Hansel and Gretel: Witch Hunters made multiple annual movie lists dedicated to underappreciated or underrated films. Movies.com opined it "is, hands down, the most underappreciated film of the year ... 'Proper' filmmaking or not, if you've got me cheering at the screening, grinning big and then walking out with a little extra adrenaline, you've done something right." Ryan Doom from JoBlo.com wrote that "while usually that's the thing I mock, [Hansel & Gretel] somehow ended up pretty damn enjoyable ... Why not? It never takes itself serious and it knows exactly what it is: a silly film that isn't afraid to do what the hell it wants." Hansel and Gretel: Witch Hunters has hence been labeled as a cult film by a number of horror-fantasy film fans, as well as by some critics who initially saw no merit in the movie. This significant financial and fan following have led some to question the initial perception of the film in relation to its debut in January, considered to be "a refuge for films that don't have a shot of generating good word of mouth or having a leggy run." While Renner's box office draw and the film's "well-articulated premise" have been listed as major factors behind its theatrical success, its ability to maintain a lasting fan following has also been attributed to its original concept, excellent gore and action sequences, Renner's and Arterton's tongue-in-cheek performances, and the film's ability to not take itself too seriously.

=== Accolades ===
At the 2014 People's Choice Awards the film was nominated in the "Favorite Horror Film" category, but lost to Carrie.

== Possible sequel ==
On March 19, 2013, Paramount announced that a sequel to the film was in the works due to overseas box office numbers. Hansel & Gretel producers Ferrell, McKay, Messick, and Flynn were reported to return. In June 2013, McKay officially confirmed his involvement and said that "everyone feels like as good as the first one is, we can really jack it up a level with the second one. So, fingers crossed everyone will come back". McKay suggested that Paramount might insist on having the sequel rated PG-13. Talking about Wirkola's "pretty insane" ideas for the second film, McKay said this could be one of those instances where the sequel does go further than the first one." Regarding the storyline, he offered one hint: "Think of different kinds of witchcraft." In June 2014, it was reported that the sequel would have a 2016 release date.

In September 2014, Wirkola announced that he would not be returning to direct the sequel, stating "I want to do something a little bit different now and not just do sequels. I did write the script and I hope to be involved in it. But yeah, I won't be directing it." He said "the first film was a learning curve for me working in the studio system and the script I wrote for the original was so different [than the final movie]. We ended up taking a lot out and altering stuff that first time. I tried taking what I learned and still delivered a sequel script that's an R-rated action film." Shortly after, Renner stated that, without Wirkola directing again, he might be less likely to return for the sequel.

On August 7, 2015, it was reported that Bruno Aveillan would make his feature film debut directing the sequel, with Wirkola as a writer and executive producer.

Despite the flurry of media reports from 2013 to 2015, as of November 2025, no sequel has ever been released, and Bruno Aveillan has yet to direct a feature film.

== Abandoned television adaptation ==
Deadline Hollywood reported on October 14, 2015, that Paramount was planning a Hansel & Gretel: Witch Hunters TV series. This never materialized.

== See also ==
- Hansel & Gretel Get Baked
- Legends: The Enchanted
- The Brothers Grimm
- List of films about witchcraft
- List of films featuring diabetes
- List of 3D films
- List of 4DX motion-enhanced films
- List of films shot in digital
