= An Icelandic Odyssey =

Album series by Norwegian avant-garde metal band Solefald

Red for Fire: An Icelandic Odyssey Part I

Studio album by Solefald
- Released: 18 October 2005
- Genre: Avant-garde metal, black metal, Viking metal
- Length: 54:20
- Label: Season of Mist
- Producer: Solefald

Solefald chronology
In Harmonia Universali (2003)	Red for Fire: An Icelandic Odyssey Part I (2005)	Black for Death: An Icelandic Odyssey Part II (2006)

Black for Death: An Icelandic Odyssey Part II

Studio album by Solefald
- Released: 24 November 2006
- Genre: Avant-garde metal, black metal, Viking metal
- Length: 50:42
- Label: Season of Mist
- Producer: Solefald

Solefald chronology
Red for Fire: An Icelandic Odyssey Part I (2005)	Black for Death: An Icelandic Odyssey Part II (2006)	Norrøn Livskunst (2010)

Red for Fire
Review scores
Source	Rating
Blabbermouth.net	6/10

Black for Death
Review scores
Source	Rating
AllMusic	2.5/5 stars

An Icelandic Odyssey is a two-part concept album series by Norwegian avant-garde metal band Solefald. The first part, Red for Fire, was released on 18 October 2005, while the second part, Black for Death, was released on 24 November 2006. The band was quoted as saying "Solefald was experimenting when everybody was being true. Now that things are changing and that we've pushed the experiment quite far already, we wanted Red for Fire plus Black for Death to be our attempts at being 'true'. This will be a true Nordic Viking metal album."

Both albums could be considered a play on how Solefald describe their music, which is as "red music with black edges".

== Track listing ==
=== Red for Fire ===
1. "Sun I Call" – 6:19
2. "Survival of the Outlaw" – 6:37
3. "Where Birds Have Never Been" – 5:5
4. "Bragi (Instrumental)" – 1:18
5. "White Frost Queen" – 6:57
6. "There Is Need" – 5:53
7. "Prayer of a Son (Poem)" – 1:47
8. "Crater of the Valkyries" – 8:21
9. "Sea I Called" – 5:34
10. "Lokasenna" – 5:39

=== Black for Death ===
All tracks written by Cornelius and Lazare.

1. "Red for Fire + Black for Death" – 3:55
2. "Queen in the Bay of Smoke" – 5:34
3. "Silver Dwarf" – 3:23
4. "Underworld (Instrumental)" – 1:15
5. "Necrodyssey" – 3:47
6. "Allfathers" – 5:56
7. "Lokasenna Part 2" – 4:29
8. "Loki Trickster God" – 5:50
9. "Spoken to the End of All (Poem)" – 2:05
10. "Dark Waves Dying (Instrumental)" - 3:55
11. "Lokasenna Part 3" – 4:47
12. "Sagateller" – 5:45

The music in the song "Loki Trickster God" is the same as in "White Frost Queen" from Red for Fire; however, "Loki Trickster God" is shorter, and the music is arranged differently in the second half of the song.

== Personnel ==
=== Solefald ===
- Cornelius – vocals, guitar, samples
- Lazare – vocals, keyboards, drums

=== Guest musicians ===
==== Red for Fire ====
- Aggie Frost Peterson – vocals on "Sun I Call" and "White Frost Queen"
- Sareeta – violin on all tracks except "There Is Need" and "Lokasenna"
- Live Julianne Kostøl – cello on all tracks except "There Is Need", "Prayer of a Son (Poem)" and "Lokasenna"
- Kjetil Selvik – saxophone on "Sun I Call"
- Jörmundur Ingi Hansen – vocals on "Lokasenna"

==== Black for Death ====
- Kristoffer Rygg – vocals on "Loki Trickster God"
- Aggie Frost Peterson – vocals on "Loki Trickster God"
- Sareeta – violin on tracks 1, 2, 6, 8, 9, 10 and 12
- Live Julianne Kostøl – cello on tracks 1, 2, 6, 8, 9 and 12
- Kjetil Selvik – saxophone on "Underworld" and "Dark Waves Dying"
- Jörmundur Ingi Hansen – vocals on "Lokasenna" compositions
