= Pheromones (Animal Alpha album) =

Studio album by Animal Alpha
- Released: 6 September 2005
- Genres: Alternative metal, nu metal
- Length: 42:14
- Label: Racing Junior
- Producer: Sylvia Massy

Animal Alpha chronology
Pheromones (2005)	You Pay for the Whole Seat, but You'll Only Need the Edge (2008)

Professional ratings
Review scores
Source	Rating
Aftenposten	3/6 stars
Bergens Tidende	3/6 stars
Dagbladet	3/6 stars

Pheromones is the first studio album released by the Norwegian rock band Animal Alpha. The track "Bundy" was featured in the video games NHL 06, Burnout Revenge and Burnout Legends. "Bundy" is also included in the end credits of the film Hansel & Gretel: Witch Hunters, but is not included in the film's soundtrack.

== Track listing ==
All songs composed by Animal Alpha

1. "Billy Bob Jackson" – 4:09
2. "I.R.W.Y.T.D" – 2:44
3. "Bundy" – 3:47
4. "Most Wanted Cowboy" – 5:37
5. "Catch Me" – 2:36
6. "101 Ways" – 5:52
7. "Deep In" – 4:23
8. "My Droogies" – 5:44
9. "Bend Over" – 4:35
10. "Remember The Day" – 2:47
