= Livskunst =

Danish and Norwegian lifestyle phrase

Livskunst is a Danish and Norwegian word that could be translated into "Art of Living", in a context meaning "... living a good and simple life".

A person living this way could be called a livskunstner. Typical for a livskunstner is his or her ability to fully enjoy the simple pleasures of life, enjoying the gifts from Mother Nature, the sounds of the birds and the waterfall, the smell of fresh baked bread or similar simple experiences. The expression does not exclude people who enjoy champagne, caviar or posh music, but the term is still focused on the simple way of life.
