= Marlene Stewart (costume designer) =

American costume designer (born 1949)

Marlene Stewart (born August 25, 1949) is an American costume designer born in Boston, Massachusetts.

Stewart began her career designing costumes for singer-songwriter Madonna's concerts. 1991 saw her big breakthrough in film, designing the costumes for JFK and Terminator 2: Judgment Day. From there, her epituare involved mostly action films like Falling Down, True Lies, The X-Files, Enemy of the State and Gone in 60 Seconds. Stewart's more recent work included on Real Steel and Hansel and Gretel: Witch Hunters. In 2012, she received the Costume Designers Guild Career Achievement Award.
