= Sturmgeist =

Norwegian band

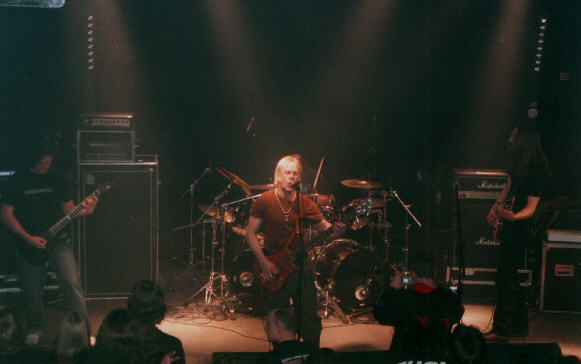

Background information
- Origin: Norway
- Genres: Experimental metal, black metal, thrash metal, industrial metal
- Years active: 2002–present
- Label: Season of Mist
- Members: Cornelius Jakhelln; John "Panzer" Jacobsen; Anti Christian

Sturmgeist is an experimental black/thrash metal band formed by Cornelius Jakhelln in 2002.

== Biography ==
=== Beginnings ===
In 2002, Cornelius Jakhelln began working on Sturmgeist ("Stormspirit" in German), an experimental mix of black/thrash metal with English, Norwegian, and German lyrics about Germanic folklore, war, Goethe's poetry. On 24 January 2005, Sturmgeist released their first album, Meister Mephisto, on Season Of Mist.

=== Tour ===
To support the album, musicians such as Asgeir Mickelson of Borknagar and Spiral Architect joined Jakhelln for a small European tour. The band played six shows in France, Belgium, England and Scotland, supporting black metal band Carpathian Forest.

=== Über ===
Starting in October, Sturmgeist began recording Über, their follow-up to Meister Mephisto in Børge Finstad's Top Room studios. The band featured tour guitarist John "Panzer" Jacobsen as an official member, and drummer Anti Christian of Tsjuder, Grimfist and The Cumshots. Season Of Mist released the album on 16 October 2006 in Europe, and on October 17 in North America.

== Members ==
=== Current line-up ===
- Cornelius Jakhelln (Solefald) - vocals, guitar, bass, keyboards/synthesizers, sampling

=== Live session musicians on the 2005 tour ===
- Panzer - guitar
- Henrik Strømme aka Sturmrik Wilde - guitar
- Asgeir Mickelson (Borknagar, Spiral Architect, Ihsahn, ex-Vintersorg, Scariot) - drums

== Releases ==
- Meister Mephisto (2005), on Season of Mist
- Über (2006), on Season of Mist
- Manifesto Futurista (2009)
