= Monumentum =

Italian band

- Origin: Italy
- Genres: Doom metal, gothic metal
- Years active: 1987–present
- Labels: Cursed Land Entertainment, Deathlike Silence, Misanthropy, Moonfog, Necropolis, Obscure Plasma, Tatra
- Members: Roberto Mammarella
- Website: Monumentum on Myspace Official website

Monumentum (often typeset as MonumentuM) are an Italian gothic metal band formed in 1987 by Roberto Mammarella, founder of Obscure Plasma Records (subsequently Avantgarde Music).

== Biography ==
Monumentum were formed in Milan in mid 1987 by guitarist Roberto Mammarella and bassist Anthony Duman, who recruited vocalist Mark Westfall and drummer Mox Cristadoro. Between December 1988 and April 1989, the band recorded and mixed the five-song demo Musaeum Hermeticum, which was released as a limited edition cassette of 180 copies. Two tracks, "Nostalgia of the Infinite" and a cover of The Dead Relatives' "Nephtali", were selected by Obscure Plasma Records for a split single with the Greek black metal band Rotting Christ in 1991.

Following a brief split, Monumentum were picked up by the predominantly black metal Norwegian label Deathlike Silence Productions. However, before the proposed album could be released, DSP owner Øystein Aarseth was murdered, leaving the band without a label. The album, In Absentia Christi, recorded and mixed between August 1994 and May 1995, finally saw the light of day through the British label Misanthropy Records. The recording line-up featured two vocalists, in the form of Andrea Zanetti (of Italian act Iconoclast) and Francesca Nicoli (of Ataraxia), alongside Mammarella ("strings, keys and vibas"), Mox Cristadoro (drums) and Paolo Mauri ("samples, artistic production and wisdom"). The band claimed the album was influenced by the poets Iginio Ugo Tarchetti and Giacomo Leopardi, and included a cover of "Fade to Grey" by Visage.

In Absentia Christi received a score of 4 out of 6 from Norway's Scream. The reviewer confirmed that the record was indeed "monumental", and should be listened to in a single sitting. The melodies were "strange" and "magical".

Activity from the band became sparse until reuniting to record "The Colour of Compassion" for Misanthropy's anti-censorship compilation Presumed Guilty (1998); the line-up for this consisted of Mammarella, Cristadoro, Federico Simonetta (bass) and Daniele Bovo (keyboards). Further compilation appearances included the Death SS tribute album Beyond the Realm of Death SS, to which Monumentum contributed a cover of "Black & Violet". The line-up for this appearance consisted of Mammarella, Cristadoro, Bovo, Max Vaccaro (bass) and Jesuis Qui (vocals); the latter is Cornelius Jakhelln of Solefald.

Monumentum reunited in 2001 to record Ad Nauseam for Tatra Productions. The line-up had changed again; Ad Nauseam featured Mammarella, Andrea Bellucci on keyboards, Daniele Bovo on guitar and keyboards, Andrea Stefanelli (of Nuvula Neshua) and Alis Francesca Bos on vocals, Diego Danelli on bass and Elisa Carrera on drums, although the latter had to pull out midway through recording after getting pregnant.

== Line-up ==
=== Current line-up ===
- Roberto Mammarella (vocals, guitar)

=== Former members ===
- Andrea Bellucci (keyboards)
- Alis Francesca Bos (session vocals)
- Daniele Bovo (guitar, keyboards)
- Elisa Carrera (drums)
- Mox Cristadoro (drums)
- Diego Danelli (session bass)
- Anthony Duman (bass)
- Cornelius Jakhelln (vocals)
- Paolo Mauri (samples, bass, engineering, mixing and artistic production)
- Francesca Nicoli (of Ataraxia; session vocals)
- Federico Simonetta (bass)
- Andrea Stefanelli (vocals)
- Mark Westfall (vocals)
- Andrea Zanetti (of Iconoclast; session vocals)
- Max Vaccaro (bass)

== Discography ==
- Musaeum Hermeticum (demo, 1989; re-released by Necropolis Records in 1999)
- Rotting Christ / Monumentum (split with Rotting Christ, Obscure Plasma Records, 1991)
- In Absentia Christi (Misanthropy Records, 1995)
- Ad Nauseam (Tatra Productions, 2002)
- Metastasi (compilation, Cursed Land Entertainment, 2004)
