= Solemn (album) =

Studio album by In Vain
- Released: April 19, 2024
- Recorded: 2022–2023
- Genre: Progressive death metal; melodic death metal
- Length: 60:55
- Label: Indie Recordings

In Vain chronology
Currents (2018)	Solemn (2024)

Professional ratings
Review scores
Source	Rating
Metal Revolution	75%
Metal Storm	8.3/10
Powermetal.de	10/10

Solemn is the fifth album by Norwegian progressive death metal band In Vain. It was released on April 19, 2024 by Indie Recordings. This is the first album to feature drummer Tobias Solbakk and the final album to feature vocalists Andreas Frigstad and Sindre Nedland, the latter of whom died from cancer in 2025.

== Track listing ==
All music is composed by Johnar Håland; "Shadows Flap Their Black Wings" and "Where the Winds Meet" co-written by Alexander Bøe.

No.	Title	Lyrics	Length
1.	"Shadows Flap Their Black Wings"	Johnar Håland	7:12
2.	"To the Gallows"	Sindre Nedland	6:37
3.	"Season of Unrest"	Sindre Nedland	7:38
4.	"At the Going Down of the Sun"	Johnar Håland	7:55
5.	"Where the Winds Meet"	Johnar Håland	6:06
6.	"Beyond the Pale"	Sindre Nedland	6:19
7.	"Blood Makes the Grass Grow"	Sindre Nedland	5:42
8.	"Eternal Waves"	Johnar Håland	6:30
9.	"Watch for Me on the Mountain"	Johnar Håland	6:56
Total length:			60:55

== Credits ==
In Vain

- Andreas Frigstad – harsh vocals
- Sindre Nedland – clean vocals, additional harsh vocals, organ, piano
- Johnar Håland – guitars, backing vocals
- Kjetil D. Pedersen – guitars
- Alexander Lebowski Bøe – bass, additional guitars (tracks 1 and 5)
- Tobias Øymo Solbakk – drums, synths, strings

Additional musicians

- Davidavi Dolev – vocals (track 9)
- Pål Gunnar Fiksdal – trumpet
- Sigurd Drågen – trombone
- Jon Henrik Rubach – saxophone
- Ingeborg Skomedal Torvanger – cello
- Madeleine Ossum – violin, viola

Production

- Jens Bogren – mixing, mastering
- Tony Lindgren – mastering
- Petter Tysland – strings recording
- Pål Gunnar Fiksdal – horns recording
- Thomas Wang – drum recording
- Subterranean Prints – cover art
- Jorn Veberg – photography
- Marcelo Vasco – layout
