= Solefald =

Norwegian avant-garde/black metal band

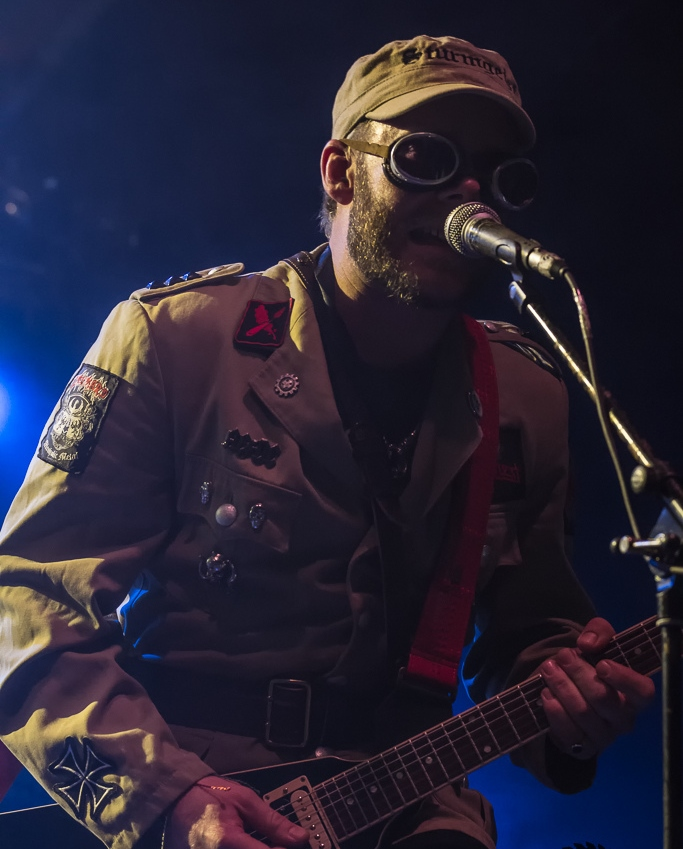
- Cornelius Jakhelln during Solefald's performance at Ragnarök Festival 2013.

Background information
- Origin: Norway
- Genres: Avant-garde metal, black metal, post-metal, industrial metal
- Years active: 1995–present
- Labels: Indie Recordings, Season of Mist, Century Media, Avantgarde Music
- Members: Cornelius Jakhelln; Lazare Nedland
- Website: http://www.solefald.no

Solefald is a Norwegian avant-garde metal/black metal band formed by Lars Are "Lazare" Nedland and Cornelius Jakhelln in August 1995. Nedland sings and plays keyboard/synthesizer/piano and drums. Jakhelln sings and plays guitar and bass. The duo experiment with an array of styles, frequently work on other projects, and rarely perform live as Solefald. They describe themselves as "two stubborn goats pretending to be a band." According to the duo, their name is Old Norse for "sunset," taken from one of Theodor Kittelsen's paintings illustrating a poem of the same name by Theodor Caspari, published in the 1901 book Vintereventyr.

== History ==
Their first official rehearsal together was in 1995 with the song "When The Moon Is On The Wave." They released their first, 5 song demo, entitled Jernlov (translated to Iron Law in English), in 1996. Jernlov was the band's most traditional black metal release, but the band had an experimental edge, incorporating Nedland's clean vocals and piano passages into the black metal formula. They were one of the first bands in the black metal genre to incorporate new elements into the style, including a bag pipe passage in one song.

The band was signed by the Milanese record label, Avantgarde Music, in 1996. In July 1997, the band released a follow-up to their demo. This first full-length release was called, The Linear Scaffold. The album was an expansion of the style on the demo. The album had a better recording quality, and contained 8 songs, two of which had previously been on the demo, but were now re-written and re-recorded. The band incorporated sounds and techniques that had never been heard in black metal before, using hand claps along with choruses in the song "Philosophical Revolt", jazzy clean guitar passages, and shrieked vocals over piano pieces. The album also featured vocals in English and Norwegian. When this album was released, the band coined the term "Red Music With Black Edges" to define themselves.

In 1998 the band began to adventure out of the studio and onto their first and only tour. The band toured through Europe supporting symphonic metal band Haggard with gothic metal band Tristania. Being a two-piece band, they employed the use of John Erik Jacobsen (aka Didrik von PanzerDanzer) on second guitar, who recently toured with, then joined, Jakhelln' new band Sturmgeist. Drummer Tarald Lie and ex-Dimmu Borgir member Jens-Petter Sandvik on the bass completed Solefald's live line-up. A press statement released in July 2012 announced Solefald's return to the stage for two festival dates, first on 15 September 2012 at the Southern Discomfort festival in Kristiansand, Norway and the second at the 2013 Inferno Festival in Oslo. Session instrumental support for both concerts will be handled by Norwegian death metal band, In Vain.

Starting in 1998 the two members started branching out into other musical endeavours, with Nedland performing the drums for the album Black Shining Leather by the Norwegian black metal band Carpathian Forest. Later, in July 1999, Jakhelln did guest vocals for the gothic metal band Monumentum for the songs "Black And Violet", a cover of the Italian band Death SS, and "The Colour of Compassion". These recordings were released in 2004 on the Monumentum compilation album, Metastasi.

In 1999, the band released their second full-length, entitled Neonism on 24 September. The album incorporated black metal, pop, classical music, punk and progressive metal. The album also featured more vocal techniques from each member. Singing in English and French, Nedland brought back his clean vocals, but also introduced a new style, in the form of hollering. Jakhelln still used his high pitched wails and shrieks and his lower grunting, but he also introduced a style of spoken word singing. The lyrics were unconventional for metal in general and black metal especially, dealing with socio-political issues and pop culture criticism. The album received mixed reviews, with some criticizing it for being too adventurous. The band even received a death threat from the USA from someone that considered the album an abomination to black metal. Others denounced it for its thin recording quality. The band stated that they used this quality because of the multi-layered song structures demanding a thinner sound to allow the many facets of the music to shine through. Another reasoning was that they wanted to use the recording style at the famed Sunlight Studios to achieve the "old school black metal" sound. The album's recording was also plagued with problems, including a mixing board that literally started burning. The band coined the term "Radical Designer Rock 'n' Roll", for this release.

Following this album, the Solefald camp grew quiet for a little while. Nedland joined progressive black metal band Borknagar as keyboard player and back-up vocalist. In 2000, Borknagar released their first release with Nedland playing with them, Quintessence.

In 2001, Solefald came together to release their third full-length. The new album, entitled Pills Against the Ageless Ills, was described by the band as "a concept album about a pair of long-lost brothers — one a pornographer, the other a monk." Musically, Pills is more straightforward than Neonism. The album features more prominent guitar, with the keys acting as an accent and background instrument much of the time. Whereas Neonism consisted of songs that would each have a variety of styles and genres within them, Pills has a variety of different style songs, each focusing individually on a certain style. Vocally, the band had made yet another change. Maintaining Nedland's style and getting rid of his hollering style singing, and keeping Jakhelln' lower black metal grunting, "Pills" saw the addition of a less high pitched black metal shriek from Jakhelln, as well as Jakhelln' most common style of singing to date. This new vocal style is a throaty sounding form of vocals, similar to some gothic rock bands. This album, released on 19 September 2001, was Solefald's first album released through the German record label Century Media.

The next Solefald endeavour came in 2003 with the full-length album In Harmonia Universali, released on 24 March 2003. The album contained 10 songs, with each song's lyrics devoted to various artists, philosophers and deities. The lyrics are also sung in four languages on this album, English, Norwegian, French and German. They incorporated a Steinway grand piano, a male choir, authentic Spanish classical acoustic guitar, violin and saxophone. The music was layered, consisting of composite riffs and leads from the guitars and hammond keyboard sections. Vocally this found Jakhelln eschewing his black metal vocal approach, sticking strictly with this throaty spoken word performance. Nedland's vocals stayed primarily the same. This was their last album released on Century Media.

In 2003 Nedland continued expanding his involvement in other bands with his inclusion as clean singer into the Viking/folk/black band Ásmegin. In 2004 he joined the avant-garde metal band Age of Silence as singer and main lyricist, which includes members such as Andy Winter from the band Winds, and Hellhammer from such bands as Arcturus, Mayhem, Winds and many more. Age of Silence released a new three song EP entitled Complications – Trilogy of Intricacy on 11 October 2005 as a lead into their approaching second full-length. Nedland has continued to do guest vocal work, being featured on the Winds album, Prominence and Demise, the Pantheon I album The Wanderer and His Shadow and the Havoc Unit album h.IV+ (Hoarse Industrial Viremia). He is also still with Borknagar, who released Universal in 2010.

In early 2005, Jakhelln released the first full-length album Meister Mephisto, through Season of Mist from his solo band, Sturmgeist, an experimental black/thrash metal band with industrial overtones. Nedland contributed back-up vocals on this release, along with vocalist Fuchs of Weimar's Die Apokalyptischen Reiter. Following shortly after the release of Black For Death, Jakhelln and Nedland continue to release more music from other projects. Jakhelln released his second and third Sturmgeist albums entitled Über and Manifesto Futurista respectively. He also recorded an experimental electronica/metal album under the band name G.U.T. entitled My Only Drug Is Madness. He is also writing the libretto for a contemporary opera telling a story from the pagan times of the North.

Later in the year 2005, the band travelled to Iceland, with funding from the Norwegian Tekstforfatterfondet (Lyricists' Fund), to write their next album. As the trip inspired more material than would fit on a single album, the group ultimately decided to split An Icelandic Odyssey into two albums, Red for Fire and Black for Death, which were released in 2005 and 2006 on the French label Season of Mist. This two-part saga is based on a story written by Jakhelln about a fictional Icelandic skald named Bragi. The band announced via Myspace on 28 March 2007 that they had parted ways with Season of Mist.

In January 2008, a Solefald remix album, entitled The Circular Drain was released through Jakhelln's independent label, Von Jackhelln Inhuman, signed and limited to 1,000 copies. It features remixes by Havoc Unit, James Fogarty project "The Bombs of Enduring Freedom", Zweizz and others. In addition to these remixes, the CD also contains the entire Jernlov demo, marking the first time it has appeared on a digital medium.

The band went on to sign with Norwegian label Indie Recordings. They released their 7th full-length, entitled Norrøn Livskunst ("The Norse art of Life") on 15 November 2010. The album features guest vocals by Agnete Kjølsrud (ex-Animal Alpha, Djerv) who was also featured the album Abrahadabra released by Dimmu Borgir in 2010 as well. It also marks Solefald's first guitar solo, brought in by the guest guitarist Vangelis Labrakis of the band Mencea. The album marked the first time the band recorded an album with nearly entirely Norwegian lyrics. In a press release it was stated that "The lyrics on 'Norrøn livskunst' are written in a 'høgnorsk' style approaching the Norse — the sound ought to cut like a knife!"

Solefald remained with Indie Recordings for their next project, Kosmopolis, which was again split into two releases. The 2014 EP Norrønasongen: Kosmopolis Nord, named for a poem by Olav Aukrust, was described by Nedland as "progressive folk-pop-noise" that "sets the scene for the forthcoming album Kosmopolis Sud by being nothing like it. We’re Solefald after all!" In 2015, the full-length album World Metal: Kosmopolis Sud claimed to merge "raw Norwegian metal and Dutch techno with Norse and African folk rhythms" to create "a true celebration of global culture."

Aside from music, Nedland is a newscaster for TVNorge, and Jakhelln is a writer/poet, with many published writings including a tetralogy of poems entitled Quadra Natura.

== Discography ==
Demo albums

- Jernlov (1995), Self-released

Studio albums

- The Linear Scaffold (1997), Avantgarde Music
- Neonism (1999), Avantgarde Music
- Pills Against the Ageless Ills (2001), Century Media
- In Harmonia Universali (2003), Century Media
- Red for Fire: An Icelandic Odyssey, Pt. 1 (2005), Season of Mist
- Black for Death: An Icelandic Odyssey, Pt. 2 (2006), Season of Mist
- Norrøn Livskunst (2010)
- Norronasongen. Kosmopolis Nord (2014)
- World Metal. Kosmopolis Sud (2015)

Compilation albums

- The Circular Drain (2008), Von Jackhelln Inhuman

== Band members ==
=== Current members ===
- Cornelius Jakhelln (Sturmgeist, G.U.T.) - Vocals, Guitars, Bass, Sampling - (1995-)
- Lars Are "Lazare" Nedland (ex-Ásmegin, Age Of Silence, Borknagar, ex-Carpathian Forest, ex-Grail, Böh, Darling Divine) - Vocals, Piano, Keyboards, Synthesizers, Organs, Drums - (1995-)

=== Current live members ===
- Kjetil D. Pedersen (In Vain) - Guitars (2012-present)
- Johnar Håland (In Vain) - Guitars (2012-present)
- Sindre Nedland (In Vain, Funeral) - Keyboards, Synthesizers, Vocals (backing) (2012-present)
- Alexander Lebowski Bøe (In Vain (live)) - Bass (2013-present)
- Baard Kolstad (Borknagar, ICS Vortex, Ihsahn (live), In Vain (live)) - Drums (2013-present)

=== Former live/session members ===
- John Erik Jacobsen a.k.a. Didrik von PanzerDanzer (Sturmgeist) - live second guitar - (1998)
- Jens-Petter Sandvik - Live bass - (1998)
- Tarald Lie - Live drums - (1998)
- Silje Ulvevadet Dæhli - Violins on Pills - (2001)
- Kjetil Selvik - Saxophone on In Harmonia and Red For Fire - (2003,2005)
- Kristian Krüger, Kjetil Selvik and Sigurd Høye - Choir on In Harmonia - (2003)
- Aggie Frost Peterson - Vocals on Red For Fire - (2005)
- Jörmundur Ingi Hansen - Spoken word on Red For Fire - (2005)
- Sareeta (Ásmegin, Ram-Zet) - Violin on Red For Fire and Black For Death - (2005, 2006)
- Live Julianne Kostøl - Cello on Red For Fire and Black For Death - (2005, 2006)
- Kristoffer Rygg a.k.a. Garm a.k.a. Trickster G (Ulver, Head Control System, ex-Arcturus, ex-Borknagar) - Vocals on Black For Death - (2006)
- Agnete Kjølsrud (ex-Animal Alpha, Djerv) - vocals on Norrøn Livskunst
- Vangelis Labrakis - guitar on Norrøn Livskunst
