= You Pay for the Whole Seat, but You'll Only Need the Edge =

Studio album by Animal Alpha
- Released: January 28, 2008
- Studio: Propeller Recordings
- Genre: Alternative metal
- Length: 36:53
- Producer: Mike Hartung

Animal Alpha chronology
Pheromones (2005)	You Pay for the Whole Seat, but You'll Only Need the Edge (2008)

Professional ratings
Review scores
Source	Rating
Aftenposten	4/6 stars
Bergens Tidende	5/6 stars
Dagbladet	5/6 stars
Verdens Gang	4/6 stars

You Pay for the Whole Seat, but You'll Only Need the Edge is the second and final album released by the Norwegian rock group Animal Alpha. The track "Fire! Fire! Fire!" was used as a soundtrack in the game MotorStorm: Pacific Rift.

== Track listing ==
All songs composed by Animal Alpha.

1. "Pin You All" – 2:55
2. "Master Of Disguise" – 3:34
3. "Fire! Fire! Fire!" – 3:20
4. "Alarm" – 4:10
5. "Breed Again" – 4:12
6. "In The Barn" – 5:40
7. "Even When I'm Wrong, I'm Right" – 3:02
8. "Tricky Threesome" – 4:09
9. "Marilyn Love Doll" (bonus track) – 5:50
