= Animal Alpha =

Norwegian rock band

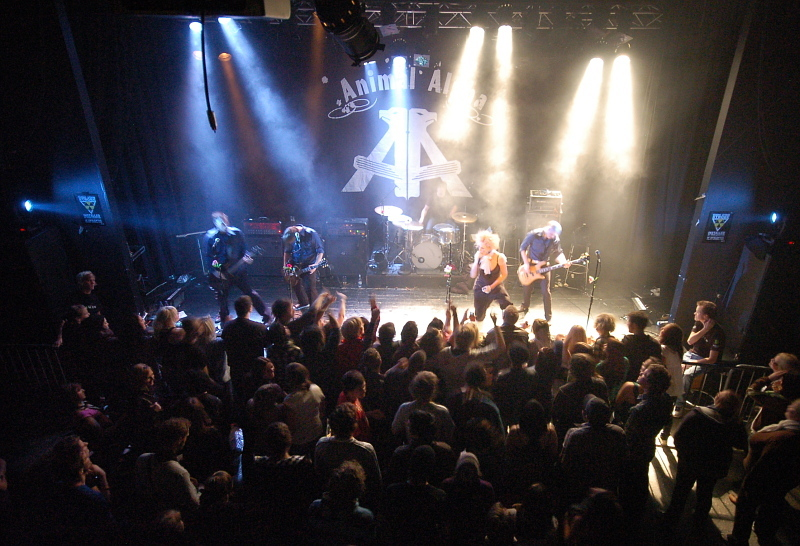
- Animal Alpha concert at Rokken in 2008

Background information
- Origin: Norway
- Genre: Alternative metal
- Years active: 2002–2009
- Label: Racing Junior
- Past members: Agnete Kjølsrud; Christian Wibe; Christer-André Cederberg; Lars Imre Bidtnes; Thomas Emil Jacobsen; Aleksander Ralla Villnes
- Website: www.myspace.com/animalalpha

Animal Alpha was a five-piece Norwegian rock group formed in 2002 and disbanded in 2009.

== History ==
The band was formed in 2002 in Oslo. Their performance at Oslo's Øya Festival received 8 out of 10 points in the British magazine, Metal Hammer, and appeared on the national TV program Lydverket. The band later had two sold-out nights at the 500-crowd-capacity John Dee Live Club & Pub in Oslo. The band then signed with a small independent record label Racing Junior and planned the release of its first EP and album for spring 2005.

The producer Sylvia Massy recorded both the EP, Animal Alpha, and the album, Pheromones, at her studio in Weed, California.

The EP achieved gold status, and charted as high as 6th on VG-lista, spending twelve weeks on the chart. At the Spellemannsprisen awards, the band received nominations for best music video and best debut artist.

A second album, You Pay for the Whole Seat, but You'll Only Need the Edge, was released on January 28, 2008.

The band performed at festivals including Rock am Ring, the Download Festival in England and Pukkelpop.

The song "Bundy" is used in the video games Burnout Revenge, Burnout Legends and NHL 06, all published by EA Games, as well as in the end credits of the action fantasy horror film Hansel & Gretel: Witch Hunters. The track "Fire! Fire! Fire!" was used during the end credits of the Norwegian comedy horror film Dead Snow and in the 2008 videogame MotorStorm: Pacific Rift.

On March 12, 2009, Animal Alpha disbanded. On its website and Myspace page, a press release was posted saying that the band "found themselves in a creative deadlock while preparing for their third album and after evaluating the situation decided to call it quits". At least two of the band members were to pursue solo careers or other projects.

== Discography ==
Singles

- "Bundy"

EPs

- Animal Alpha (2005)

Studio albums

- Pheromones (2005)
- You Pay for the Whole Seat, but You'll Only Need the Edge (2008)

== Personnel ==
- Agnete Kjølsrud - lead vocals
- Christian Wibe - lead guitar, backing vocals
- Christer-André Cederberg - rhythm guitar, backing vocals
- Lars Imre Bidtnes - bass guitar, backing vocals
- Thomas Emil Jacobsen - drums, percussion
- Aleksander Ralla Villnes - drums, percussion
