= Graspop Metal Meeting =

Belgian rock festival

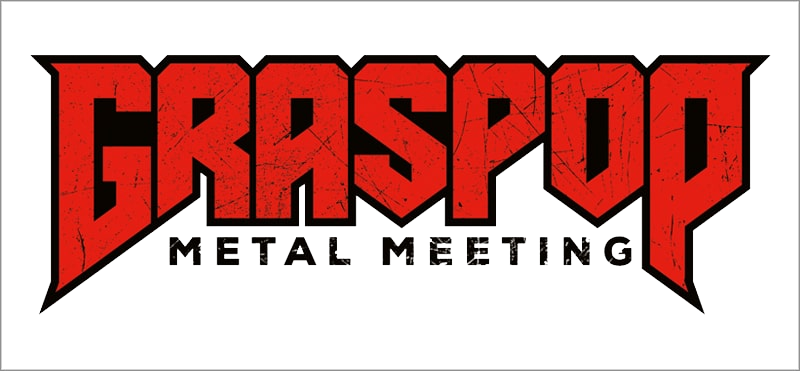

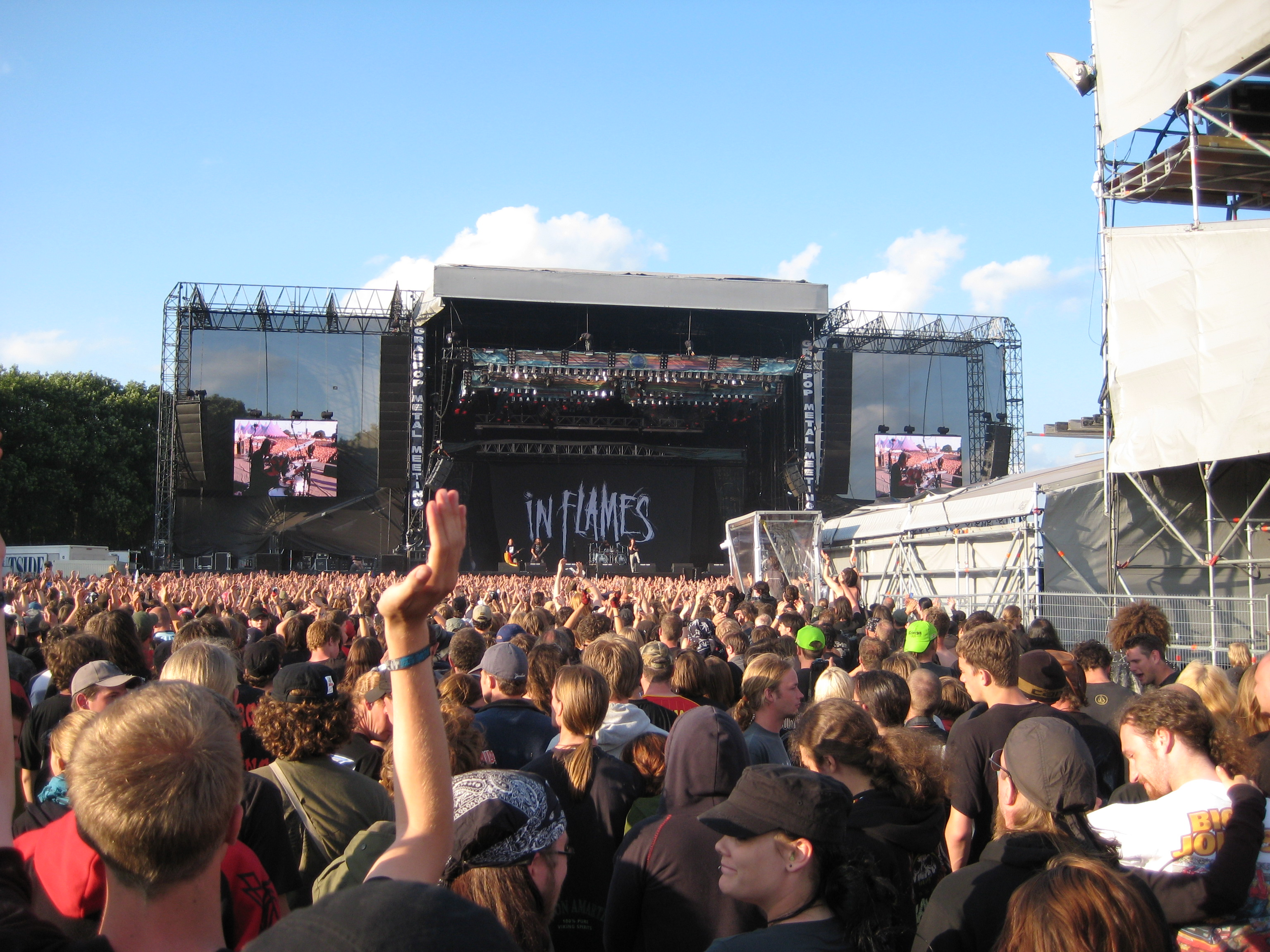
- In Flames performing at Graspop 2008
- Genre: Performing arts festival
- Frequency: Annually
- Locations: Dessel, Antwerp, Flemish Region, Belgium
- Coordinates: 51°13′48.15″N 5°05′2.36″E
- Years active: 1996–2019, 2022–present
- Inaugurated: 30 July 1996
- Founder: Peter Van Geel
- Participants: See lineups
- Attendance: 95,000
- Capacity: 55,000 (45,000 weekend tickets + 10,000 day tickets)
- Area: Festivalterrein Stenehei
- Website: www.graspop.be

Graspop Metal Meeting is a Belgian heavy metal festival held in Dessel each year since 1996, excluding 2020 and 2021 due to covid restrictions. Despite the small size of the festival grounds (upholding a perimeter of only ~4 km) the festival draws a large number of spectators from around the world, many sources overestimate the total number of attendees each year. For 2024, GMM had a capacity of 45,000 weekend tickets plus an additional 10,000 day tickets over the 4 days making a total attendance of 95,000 individual visitors.

A total of 220,000 visitors in 2022 and 2023, up from 200,000 visitors over the course of the 2019 edition, and 152,000 in 2015.

== History ==
Graspop was not originally a heavy metal festival; rather, it was conceived as a local family rock festival, first organised in 1986. In 1995, the headliners were Joe Cocker and Simple Minds. However, due to the public being oversaturated with family festivals, the number of visitors had dropped to an all-time low.

Founder Peter Van Geel realized that mainstream rock music held insufficient appeal to festival visitors. Reflecting on the most memorable acts of the preceding years (Motörhead, Ramones, Paradise Lost, and so forth) and on his own musical preferences, he decided in favour of a drastic reorientation.

After discussions with Werchter festival promoter Herman Schueremans, Van Geel contacted Bob Schoenmaekers, the owner of the Biebob concert venue and metal club in nearby Vosselaar. A couple of years earlier, Schoenmaekers had set up his "Midsummer Metal Meeting" in Vosselaar and because of space limits, he was considering an open-air festival. The initial contact soon led to close collaboration. The duo decided to launch a brand-new metal festival under the name of "Graspop Metal Meeting". The date of choice was to be the last weekend of June.

The new direction proved to be a successful one. The festival has seen a continually rising number of visitors over the years, and has been able to attract the most popular international bands in the genre. Since the festival's inception in 1996, Hatebreed and Iron Maiden have been the most frequently booked bands with 11 appearances each. Other bands which have prominently been featured are Cradle of Filth, Epica, In Flames, Saxon, Sick of It All, Slayer and Within Temptation with 10 appearances, and Behemoth, Judas Priest, Megadeth, Moonspell, My Dying Bride, Sabaton and Slipknot with 9 appearances.

The current stages are :

- Main Stage 1 & 2 : The two main stages, host important bands and headlining acts. Before 2014, there was only one main stage.
- Marquee : A tent stage, which hosts mostly thrash metal, death metal, black metal or even stoner rock bands.
- Metal Dome : Hosts local performances, but is mostly known for the afterparty that closes the festival every year, hosted by house dj, Vj Carl.
- Jupiler Stage : First held in 2014, it is a small open air stage, mostly dedicated to metalcore, hardcore and deathcore music.
- "Classic rock café" : Hosts acoustic sessions and home to VJ Carl (DJ Carl's classic rock gems). Since 2016 he started featuring his gogo dancers which made their daily afterparties gain popularity.

== Location ==
Map showing the location of Graspop Metal Meeting within Belgium.

The festival is located in Kastelsedijk, in Dessel and is situated about 60 km away from Antwerp, 99 km from Brussels and 35 km from Eindhoven in the Netherlands.

Dessel is a municipality with 9103 inhabitants in the province of Antwerp in Belgium. The 27.03 km ² comprehensive community lies in the Flemish Region, also known as Flanders, this is the officially Dutch-speaking part of Belgium. The distance to the Netherlands is less than 10 km. The largest part of the economy of Dessel is determined by different regions of the nuclear power industry. Dessel is the twin town of Hesse-Lichtenau.

== Tickets ==
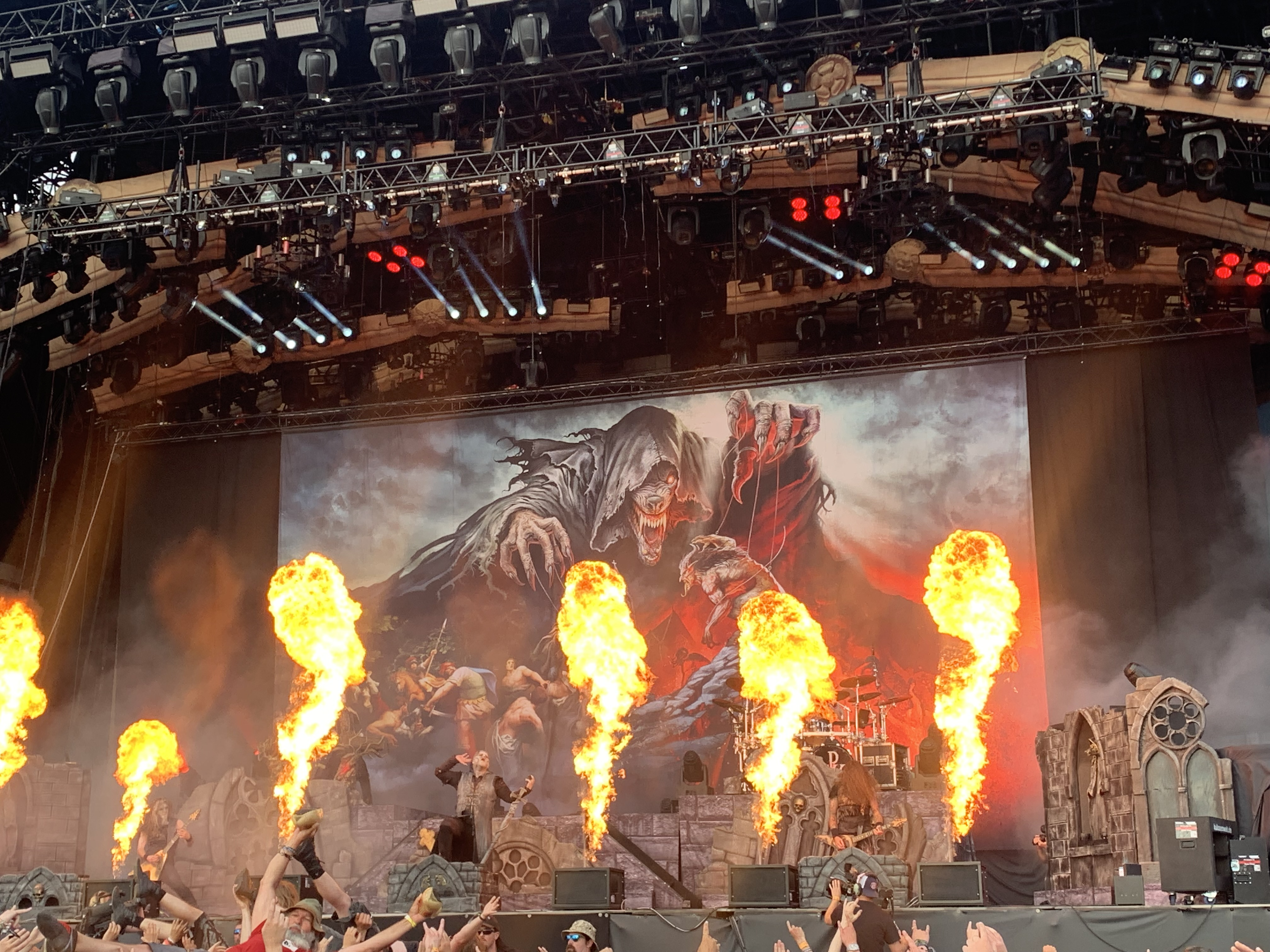
Powerwolf at Graspop in 2022

Combination tickets for the Graspop Metal Meeting include camping from Thursday to Monday, parking for a vehicle (until 2022) and entry to the festival site. Day tickets are available, and before 2013 they did not include camping; camping tickets could be purchased separately. Camping tickets allowed day ticket holders to spend the night on the camping site. A camping ticket was valid on the same day as the festival ticket. From 2013 onwards, a day ticket included admission to the campsite.

In 2009 Graspop Metal Meeting introduced a VIP ticket. The VIP package consists of: parking space in the VIP car park; which is nearer the festival ground, access to the VIP lounge, and separate entrances to the campsite and the festival arena.

Ticket Prices
Year	Combi Ticket	Day Ticket	Camping Ticket
1996; 1997; 1998; 1999; 2000; 2001; 2002; 2003; 2004; 2005; 2006; 2007; 2008; 2009; 2010; 2011; 2023; 2024 2025 2026	€50 €65 €90 €105 €108 €125 €130 €135 €145 €146 €150 €160 €165 €189 €195 €299 €309 €309 €509(VIP) €319 €525(VIP)	€40 (Sat) €35 (Fri) €50 (Sat) €35 (Sat) €50 (Sat & Sun) €50 (Fri & Sat) €55 (Sun) €50 (Fri& Sun) €60 (Sat) €69 €69 (Fri & Sat) €75 (Sun) €69 €75 €76 €80 €80 €85 €89 €95 €119 €125 €129 €229(VIP) €135 €245(VIP)	€15 (First year) €15 €15 €15 included in day ticket €35/d

== Accommodation ==
Most people who stay at Graspop Metal Meeting will camp in a tent. Campsite accommodation is provided in the cost of a combi ticket but festival-goers must bring their own tents.

Caravans and trailer tents are not allowed onto the camp site. However attendees can book a pitch in addition to the main ticket which allows access to Graspop Metal Town.

=== Graspop Metal Town ===
Graspop Metal Town is located at just 1 km from the festival site and is an open air hotel with its sanitary facilities, breakfast tent, bar and reception desk. Attendees can either spend the night in a Festihut or can book a pitch for their motorhome, caravan or tent.

==== Festihuts ====
Introduced in 2008 the Festihut is a wooden cottage equipped with beds or bunk beds and mattresses.

Festihut details:

- Four people per Festihut, equipped with (bunk) beds and mattresses
- Dimensions: 3 m x 2.5 m (7.5 m^{2})
- Lockable door and insulated roof
- One window as a minimum
- Wooden floor at least 10 cm above the ground
- 1 rechargeable lantern per hut (to be charged at the reception desk)
- All huts have electricity (max. 300W)
- Guests must bring their own sheets
- Smoking inside the Festihut is prohibited

Festihut Prices
Year	1 Person	2 People	4 People	6 People
2012; 2013	€525	€550 €550	€575 €600	€600

==== Pitches ====
Metal Town has space for 250 standard pitches and 50 XL pitches, for people who want to bring a caravan, mobile home, or tent.

Pitch details:

- 1 pitch = max. 6 persons
- Pitch standard: 8m x 4m / pitch XL: 12m x 4m
- Every pitch has electricity (max. 300W). Electricity will be available but attendees still need to bring their own extension leads.
- (Folding) caravan owners must return their car to the car park after leaving their caravan at the pitch.
- Each pitch is rented for 4 nights.
- Owners who leave their vehicle behind will be fined €500/vehicle.
- Cars are not allowed to park next to the Festihut or pitch. Guests must return their car to the car park after leaving their belongings in the Festihut or at the pitch (except for mobile homes).

Pitch Prices
Year	1 Person	2 People	3 People	4 People	5 People	6 People
	Standard/XL	Standard/XL	Standard/XL	Standard/XL	Standard/XL	Standard/XL
2012; 2013	€150	€175 €175/€225	€200	€225 €225/€275	€250	€275 €275/€320

== Graspop Metal Meeting 1996 ==
Sunday June 30
Mainstage	Marquee
Iron Maiden; Slayer; Life of Agony; Channel Zero; Sick of It All; Fear Factory; Tiamat; Skin; Gorefest	Type O Negative; Morbid Angel; Downset. Shelter; Drain STH; Manhole; Revoker

- Helloween was announced, but had to cancel and were replaced by Skin

== Graspop Metal Meeting 1997 ==
Sunday June 29
Mainstage	Marquee	Skate Stage
Megadeth; Alice Cooper; Biohazard; Saxon; Napalm Death; Grip Inc. Samael; Entombed; Pist.On	Tiamat; Moonspell; Cradle of Filth; The Gathering; Dimmu Borgir	Madball; Lagwagon; Ryker's; Millencolin; Deviate; Handsome

My Dying Bride was announced as headliner in the Marquee but they had to cancel because of the illness of their drummer.
Obituary was replaced by Napalm Death.

== Graspop Metal Meeting 1998 ==
Sunday June 28
Mainstage	Marquee I	Marquee II
Black Sabbath; Dream Theater; Deftones; Soulfly; Iced Earth; Coal Chamber; Obituary; Spiritual Beggars	Paradise Lost; Moonspell; Dimmu Borgir; In Flames; Within Temptation	Primus; Madball; Pro-Pain; The Misfits; Congress

== Graspop Metal Meeting 1999 ==
Sunday June 27
Main Stage	Marquee I	Marque II
Manowar; Sepultura; Motörhead; Stormtroopers of Death; The Gathering; Kreator; Primal Fear; Darkane; Ancient Rites	Cradle of Filth; Mercyful Fate; Immortal; Anathema; Children of Bodom; Hypocrisy	Danzig; Slapshot; Ryker's; Pitchshifter; Ignite; Out

== Graspop Metal Meeting 2000 ==
Saturday June 24
Mainstage	Marque I	Marque II
Iron Maiden; Slayer; Machine Head; Rollins Band; Saxon; Testament; Gamma Ray; Entombed; Dirty Deeds	My Dying Bride; Anathema; Tristania; Samael; Apocalyptica; Cannibal Corpse; God Dethroned; Oceans of Sadness	Cro-Mags; Madball; Skarhead; No Fun at All; 59 Times the Pain; Liberator; Bombshell Rocks; Voice of a Generation

== Graspop Metal Meeting 2001 ==
Friday June 22
Marquee 1/Campfest

Action in DC
Nevermore
Rose Tattoo
Destruction
Devin Townsend
Ancient Rites
Metalium

Saturday June 23
Main Stage	Marquee I	Marquee II
Judas Priest; Cradle of Filth; Megadeth; Motörhead; Savatage; Primal Fear; Farmer Boys; Kill II This; Pist.On	Marduk; Within Temptation; Six Feet Under; Macabre; The Haunted; Orphanage; Unleashed	Suicidal Tendencies; Dropkick Murphys; Sick of It All; Shelter; Backfire; Awkward Thought

== Graspop Metal Meeting 2002 ==
Friday July 5
Marquee I	Marquee II
Saxon; Anathema; Kreator; Moonspell; Doro; Rage; Manic Movement	Agnostic Front; After Forever; Less Than Jake; In Extremo; Massif; Skarhead; Xeah

Saturday July 6
Main Stage	Marquee I	Marquee II
Slayer; Dream Theater; Machine Head; Bruce Dickinson; Halford; Tristania; Edguy; Calibre; Evergrey	My Dying Bride; Immortal; Cannibal Corpse; Hypocrisy; Arch Enemy; Dismember	Biohazard; Slapshot; The Vandals; D.R.I. Deviate; Subzero

== Graspop Metal Meeting 2003 ==
Friday July 4
Marquee I	Marquee II
Type O Negative; Sepultura; Opeth; Samael; Mastodon; Oceans of Sadness	Stratovarius; Apocalyptica; Overkill; Masterplan; Atreyu; Aborted

Saturday July 5
Main Stage	Marquee I	Marquee II
Iron Maiden; Alice Cooper; Within Temptation; Anthrax; Murderdolls; Arch Enemy; Doro; Pro-Pain; Killer	Ministry; Lacuna Coil; Six Feet Under; Finntroll; The Haunted; Deströyer 666	Stone Sour; Sick of It All; Hatebreed; Prong; Youth of Today; Convict

== Graspop Metal Meeting 2004 ==
Friday June 25
Main Stage	Marquee I
Iced Earth; Anathema; In Extremo; Circle II Circle; Action in DC; Cowboys & Aliens	Exodus; Hypocrisy; After Forever; Suffocation; Dillinger Escape Plan; Epica

Saturday June 26
Main Stage	Marquee I	Marquee II
Alice Cooper; Slipknot; Motörhead; Soulfly; Queensrÿche; Pleymo; Brides of Destruction; Evergrey	Cradle of Filth; My Dying Bride; Anthrax; Morbid Angel; Oomph! Scarve	Agnostic Front; Terror; Blood for Blood; Discipline; Backfire; Do or Die

Sunday June 27
Main Stage	Marquee I	Marquee II
Judas Priest; Life of Agony; Fear Factory; Saxon; Testament; Destruction; Seven Witches	Dimmu Borgir; Children of Bodom; Therion; Death Angel; Dying Fetus; Malevolent Creation	Hatebreed; Ill Niño; Ignite; Chimaira; Killswitch Engage; Shadows Fall

== Graspop Metal Meeting 2005 ==
Friday June 24
Main Stage	Marquee I	Marquee II	Metal Dome
System of a Down; Within Temptation; Papa Roach; Helmet; Alter Bridge; The Ga*Ga*s	Nevermore; Megadeth; Metal Church; Grave Digger; Enslaved; Immolation	Kreator; Dillinger Escape Plan; Madball; H_{2}O; Caliban; The Eighties Matchbox B-Line Disaster	In-Quest; Autumn; Axamenta; Judasville; Cowboys and Aliens; Chimaira; Sengir

Saturday June 25
Main Stage	Marquee I	Marquee II
Slipknot; Slayer; Accept; Hatebreed; Kamelot; Epica; Soilwork; Skitsoy	In Flames; Sirenia; Samael; Amon Amarth; Gorefest; Behemoth	Anthrax; Sick of It All; Mastodon; Rose Tattoo; Pro-Pain; Peter Pan Speedrock

Sunday June 26
Main Stage	Marquee I	Marquee II
Iron Maiden; Dream Theater; Dio; Yngwie Malmsteen; Primal Fear; Axel Rudi Pell; DragonForce	Lacuna Coil; Dark Tranquillity; Nuclear Assault; Aborted; Oceans of Sadness	Terror; Amen; Walls of Jericho; Murphy's Law; Hatesphere

== Graspop Metal Meeting 2006 ==
Friday June 23
Main Stage	Marquee I	Marquee II	Metal Dome
Whitesnake; Lacuna Coil; Michael Schenker Group; Edguy; Trivium; Y&T; Anvil	Satyricon; Moonspell; The Gathering; Stream of Passion; Leaves' Eyes; Sengir	Die Krupps; Evergrey; Soilwork; 36 Crazyfists; Gojira; Darkane	Axamenta; Leng Tch'e; Callenish Circle; Panchrysia; Iconoclasm; Battalion; The Maple Room

Saturday June 24
Main Stage	Marquee I	Marquee II	Metal Dome
Guns N' Roses; Soulfly; Alice in Chains; Stone Sour; Avenged Sevenfold; Bullet for My Valentine; Bloodsimple	Opeth; My Dying Bride; Nile; Obituary; Ancient Rites; Akercocke	Death Angel; Ill Niño; Jon Oliva's 'Pain'; The New York Dolls; The Datsuns; Caliban	Action in Dc; Up the Irons; Ozzy Oz; Purple Strangers; Nutellica

Sunday June 25
Main Stage	Marquee I	Marquee II
Motörhead; Saxon; Helloween; In Flames; Armored Saint; DragonForce; Machine Men	Cradle of Filth; After Forever; Exodus; Enthroned; Ensiferum; In-Quest	Arch Enemy; Agnostic Front; Ignite; DevilDriver; Beyond Fear; As I Lay Dying

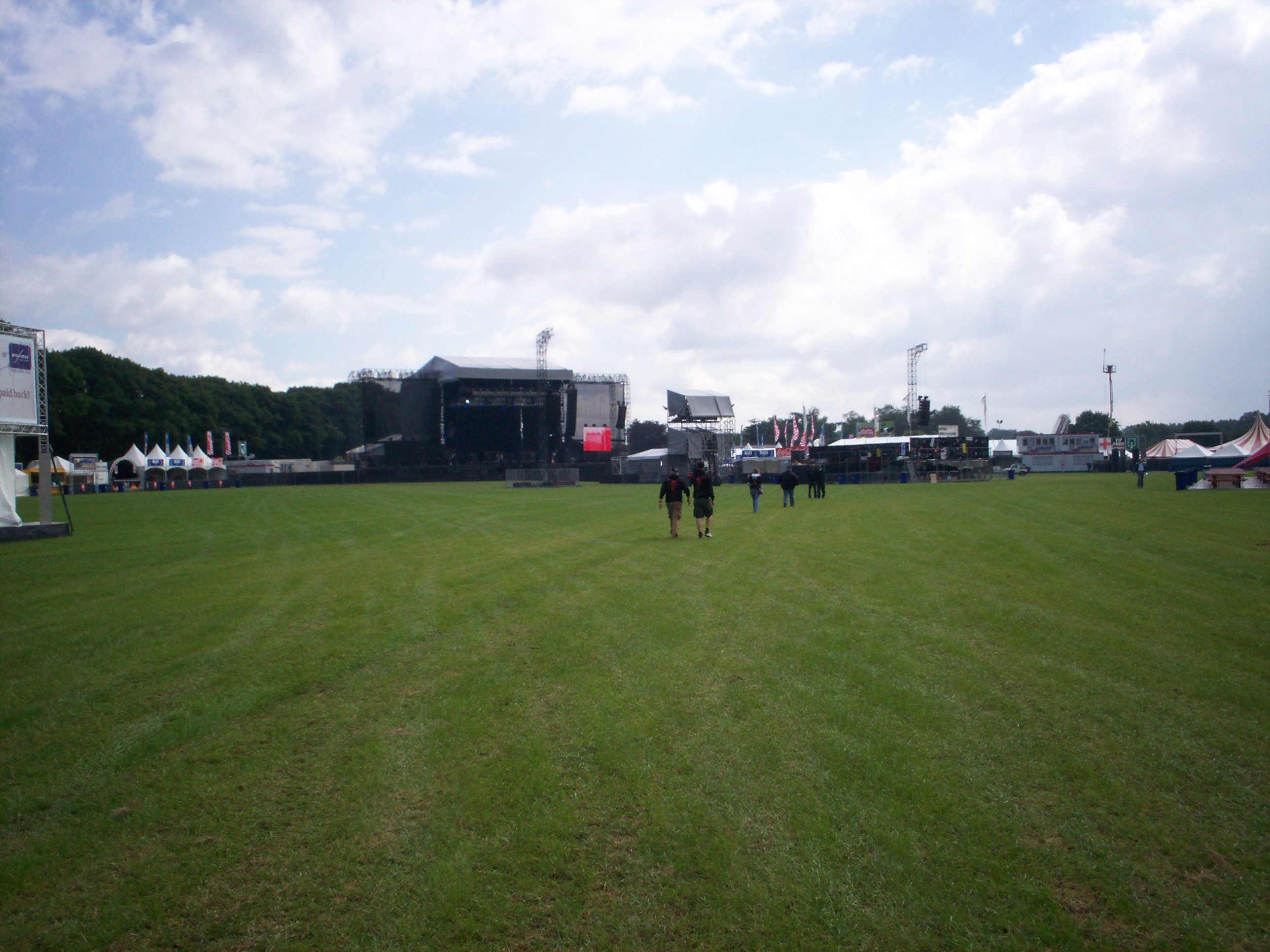
The field of graspop just before the 2008 festival

== Graspop Metal Meeting 2007 ==
Friday June 22
Main Stage	Marquee I	Marquee II	Metal Dome
Aerosmith; Chris Cornell; Within Temptation; Static-X; Thin Lizzy; Fastway	Blind Guardian; Joe Satriani; Pain of Salvation; Grave Digger; Epica; Sabaton	Therion; Type O Negative; Celtic Frost; Amorphis; Vader; 1349	Volbeat; Belphegor; Textures; Crimson Falls; TAB

Saturday June 23
Main Stage	Marquee I	Marquee II	Metal Dome
Iron Maiden; KoЯn; Heaven & Hell; Life of Agony; Stone Sour; Lamb of God; Lauren Harris	Dimmu Borgir; Tiamat; Cannibal Corpse; Atheist; Sirenia; Brutal Truth	Me First and the Gimme Gimmes; Drowning Pool; Less Than Jake; Legion of the Damned; Rose Hill Drive; Spiralarms	Bloodsimple; Scarve; Thurisaz; Suhrim; Spoiler NYC

Sunday June 24
Main Stage	Marquee I	Marquee II	Metal Dome
Ozzy Osbourne; Slayer; Children of Bodom; Papa Roach; HammerFall; Black Label Society; Chimaira; DevilDriver	Amon Amarth; Finntroll; Korpiklaani; Moonsorrow; Turisas; Eluveitie	Mastodon; As I Lay Dying; Unearth; Cynic; Mercenary; In This Moment	Stormrider; Oceans of Sadness; El Guapo Stuntteam; Spoil Engine; Asrai; Welkin

== Graspop Metal Meeting 2008 ==
Friday June 27
Main Stage	Marquee I	Marquee II	Metal Dome
Judas Priest; Whitesnake; Def Leppard; Saxon; Yngwie Malmsteen; Tesla	Ministry; Testament; Symphony X MoonSpell; Black Stone Cherry	Morbid Angel; Nile; Obituary; Deathstars; Behemoth	Firewind; Damn Your Idols; The Lucifer Principle; Steak Number Eight; Dedicted

Saturday June 28
Main Stage	Marquee I	Marquee II	Metal Dome
Kiss; Cavalera Conspiracy; Iced Earth; Sonata Arctica; Forbidden; Sabaton	My Dying Bride; Immortal; Korpiklaani; Dying Fetus; Hollenthon; Novembers Doom	Helmet; Bring Me the Horizon; 36 Crazyfists; Agent Steel; Bleeding Through; Throwdown	Delain; Valient Thorr; Alestorm; Die Mannequin; Hacride

Sunday June 29
Main Stage	Marquee I	Marquee II	Metal Dome
Iron Maiden; In Flames; Avenged Sevenfold; Bullet for My Valentine; Apocalyptica; Rose Tattoo; Lauren Harris	At the Gates; Primordial; Soilwork; Alchemist; Rotting Christ	Arch Enemy; Madball; Converge; Comeback Kid; Skindred; Disfear	Action in DC; Shai Hulud; The Seventh; Witchsmeller Pursuivant; After All; Black Tide

== Graspop Metal Meeting 2009 ==
Friday June 26
Main Stage	Marquee I	Marquee II	Metal Dome
Mötley Crüe; Heaven & Hell; Soulfly; Papa Roach; DragonForce; Buckcherry	Dream Theater; Blind Guardian; W.A.S.P. Jon Oliva's Pain; Firewind	Down; Static-X; Exodus; Pestilence; Lȧȧz Rockit	The Gathering; Samael; Taake; Lauren Harris

Saturday June 27
Main Stage	Marquee I	Marquee II	Metal Dome
Slipknot; KoЯn; Journey; Hatebreed; Mastodon; Black Stone Cherry; In-Quest	Lacuna Coil; Death Angel; Gojira; Legion of the Damned; Kataklysm; Keep of Kalessin	Volbeat; Monster Magnet; Duff McKagan's Loaded; Parkway Drive; No Use for a Name; All Shall Perish	Wolves in the Throne Room; Dagoba; Delain; Negură Bunget; Manic Movement

Sunday June 28
Main Stage	Marquee I	Marquee II	Metal Dome
Marilyn Manson; Nightwish; Disturbed; Chickenfoot; Trivium; Lamb of God; UFO	Children of Bodom; Epica; Sacred Reich; Candlemass; Scar Symmetry; Warbringer	Sick of It All; Anthrax; DevilDriver; Suicidal Tendencies; God Forbid; Flyleaf	Karma to Burn; All That Remains; Eths; August Burns Red; The Reckoning

== Graspop Metal Meeting 2010 ==
Friday June 25
Main Stage	Marquee I	Marquee II	Metal Dome
Aerosmith; Motörhead; Stone Temple Pilots; Slayer; Billy Talent; ReVamp	My Dying Bride; Tarja; Therion; Anathema; Krypteria; Ghost Brigade	Saxon; Doro; U.D.O. The Poodles; Anvil; Raven	Nile; Sepultura; Devin Townsend Project; The Devil's Blood; Bleeding Through; Oceans of Sadness

Saturday June 26
Main Stage	Marquee I	Marquee II	Metal Dome
Soulfly; Channel Zero; Slash; Carcass; Bullet for My Valentine; Sabaton; Killing Machine	Immortal; Paradise Lost; Obituary; Cannibal Corpse; Dark Funeral; Hail of Bullets	Airbourne; Sick of It All; Fear Factory; Walls of Jericho; Death by Stereo; Sylosis	Eluveitie; Tankard; 3 Inches of Blood; Spoil Engine; Dear Superstar; Iron Mask

Sunday June 27
Main Stage	Marquee I	Marquee II	Metal Dome
Kiss; Hatebreed; Killswitch Engage; Jon Oliva's Pain; Exodus; Evergrey; Atreyu	Amon Amarth; Bloodbath; Behemoth; Alestorm; Katatonia; Necrophobic	DevilDriver; Unearth; A Day to Remember; As I Lay Dying; Mucky Pup; Job for a Cowboy	Finntroll; Korpiklaani; 36 Crazyfists; The Faceless; Deadlock; Between the Buried and Me

== Graspop Metal Meeting 2011 ==
Friday June 24
Main Stage	Marquee I	Marquee II	Metal Dome
Scorpions; Volbeat; KoЯn; Journey; Foreigner; Dio Disciples; FM	Iced Earth; Epica; Watain; Corrosion of Conformity; The Black Dahlia Murder; Arkona	Parkway Drive; The Damned Things; Heaven Shall Burn; Sepultura; The Dwarves; Protest the Hero	Duff McKagan's Loaded; Angel Witch; The Rods; Sweet Savage; Endless Dark; Revoker

Saturday June 25
Main Stage	Marquee I	Marquee II	Metal Dome
Judas Priest; Whitesnake; Channel Zero; Black Label Society; Firewind; Lacuna Coil; Diablo Blvd	Cradle of Filth; Arch Enemy; Moonspell; Triptykon; Suicide Silence; Kvelertak	Bullet for My Valentine; Monster Magnet; Times of Grace; Bleed from Within; Kylesa; Adept	Pain; Electric Wizard; Spiritual Beggars; Ghost; Black Spiders; After the Burial

Sunday June 26
Main Stage	Marquee I	Marquee II	Metal Dome
Slipknot; Rob Zombie; Avenged Sevenfold; Mastodon; Kreator; Anvil; Pagan's Mind	Cavalera Conspiracy; Opeth; Legion of the Damned; Moonsorrow; Amorphis; Baptized in Blood	Bring Me the Horizon; Dublin Death Patrol; Terror; Pro-Pain; D.R.I. Rise to Remain	Soilwork; Escape the Fate; Architects; Gwar; While She Sleeps; Steak Number Eight

== Graspop Metal Meeting 2012 ==
Friday June 22
Main Stage	Marquee I	Marquee II	Metal Dome
Ozzy and Friends; Slayer; Sabaton; Slash; Black Label Society; Godsmack; Tracer	Lamb of God; Amon Amarth; Paradise Lost; Sacred Reich; Ensiferum; Skeletonwitch	Kyuss Lives! Sick of It All; DevilDriver; August Burns Red; Unearth; I Killed the Prom Queen	Cannibal Corpse; Obituary; Aborted; Possessed; Winterfylleth; Saille

Saturday June 23
Main Stage	Marquee I	Marquee II	Metal Dome
Limp Bizkit; Twisted Sister; Megadeth; Trivium; Thin Lizzy; Primal Fear; Adrenaline Mob; Powerwolf	Dimmu Borgir; My Dying Bride; Exodus; Eluveitie; Death Angel; Alestorm	Pennywise; Fear Factory; Comeback Kid; All Shall Perish; The Spudmonsters; While She Sleeps	Ihsahn & Leprous; Nasum; Brutal Truth; Suicidal Angels; Dear Superstar; Heidevolk; Kobra and the Lotus

Sunday June 24
Main Stage	Marquee I	Marquee II	Metal Dome
Guns N' Roses; Motörhead; Machine Head; Killswitch Engage; Europe; Sebastian Bach; Six Hour Sundown	Children of Bodom; Behemoth; Jon Oliva's Pain; Gotthard; Ugly Kid Joe; MaYaN	Hatebreed; Gojira; AxeWound; H_{2}O; Emmure; Cancer Bats	Texas in July; Betraying the Martyrs; Rival Sons; Spoil Engine; Black Spiders; The Treatment

== Graspop Metal Meeting 2013 ==
Friday June 28
Main Stage	Marquee I	Marquee II	Metal Dome
Twisted Sister; KoЯn; Coal Chamber; Papa Roach; Helloween; Grave Digger; Heathen; Crucified Barbara	Kreator; Mayhem; Dark Funeral; Korpiklaani; Unleashed; Varg	Soulfly; Heaven Shall Burn; Prong; All That Remains; Asking Alexandria; Veil of Maya	Katatonia; Rotting Christ; Entombed; Love and Death; Bliksem; The Monolith Deathcult; Generation Kill

Saturday June 29
Main Stage	Marquee I	Marquee II	Metal Dome
Slipknot; Saxon; Within Temptation; Bullet for My Valentine; The Devil Wears Prada; Rockstar; Brainstorm; Vanderbuyst	Iced Earth; Hypocrisy; U.D.O. Steak Number Eight; Tankard; Amaranthe	P.O.D. Down; Agnostic Front; Caliban; Thy Art Is Murder; After the Burial	Absu; Lock Up; Aura Noir; Dunderbeist; Between the Buried and Me; Sylosis; Hacktivist

Sunday June 30
Main Stage	Marquee I	Marquee II	Metal Dome
Iron Maiden; In Flames; Stone Sour; Parkway Drive; Hellyeah; Pretty Maids; Voodoo Six	King Diamond; Epica; Ghost; God Seed; Moonspell; Winterfylleth	Testament; Newsted; Unearth; The Ghost Inside; Deez Nuts; Every Time I Die	The Sword; Karma to Burn; Red Fang; Bullet; Heaven's Basement; King Hiss

== Graspop Metal Meeting 2014 ==
Megadeth had to cancel their show. They used to be the headliner on Mainstage 2 on Sunday.

Thursday June 26
Jupiler Stage	Metal Dome
Diablo Blvd; Evil Invaders; Ostrogoth; Dyscordia	Knives to a Gunfight; Temptations for the Weak; Atmospheres

Friday June 27
Main Stage 01	Main Stage 02	Marquee	Metal Dome	Jupiler Stage
Avenged Sevenfold; Slayer; Steel Panther; Ghost; Seether; Jeff Scott Soto	Sabaton; Behemoth; Sepultura; Doro; Annihilator; Lynch Mob; Alestorm	Opeth; Watain; Triptykon; Candlemass; Napalm Death; Solstafir; Novembers Doom	Graveyard; Unida; Orange Goblin; Walking Papers; Of Mice & Men; Miss May I Suicidal Angels; The Treatment; High Voltage	Emmure; Buckcherry; Blessthefall; Huntress; Battlecross

Saturday June 28
Main Stage 01	Main Stage 02	Marquee	Metal Dome	Jupiler Stage
Volbeat; Alter Bridge; Mastodon; Gamma Ray; Skillet; Prime Circle; Civil War	Limp Bizkit; Trivium; W.A.S.P. Gojira; Powerwolf; Dagoba	Carcass; Neurosis; Satyricon; Eluveitie; Legion of the Damned; Nile; Necrophobic; In Solitude	Dark Tranquility; The Dillinger Escape Plan; Cult of Luna; Amplifier; Enslaved; Amenra; Nails; Carach Angren; Stahlzeit	Kylesa; Pro-Pain; Walls of Jericho; Protest the Hero; Skyharbor

Sunday June 29
Main Stage 01	Main Stage 02	Marquee	Metal Dome	Jupiler Stage
Black Sabbath; Soundgarden; Alice in Chains; Anthrax; Black Label Society; The Black Dahlia Murder	"Diablo Radio" (covers by Diablo Blvd); Rob Zombie; Hatebreed; Bring Me the Horizon; Suicide Silence; Comeback Kid; Powerman 5000	Meshuggah; Paradise Lost; Death: DTA; Tiamat; The Church of Pungent Stench; Cynic; Glorior Belli	Metal Church; Sebastian Bach; Vandenberg's Moonkings; Rhapsody of Fire; Gloryhammer; Scorpion Child; Collibus	Architects; We Came as Romans; Thy Art Is Murder letlive Crossfaith

== Graspop Metal Meeting 2015 ==
Thursday June 18
Marquee	Jupiler Stage	Metal Dome
Present Danger; Up the Irons; The Art of Pantera; Diolegacy	Wolves Scream; Age of Torment; Powerstroke	Bliksem; Oceans of Sadness; Your Highness; Hell City

Friday June 19
Main Stage 01	Main Stage 02	Marquee	Metal Dome	Jupiler Stage
KISS; Slash Featuring Myles Kennedy & The Conspirators; Cavalera Conspiracy; Epica; Thunder; H.E.A.T	Marilyn Manson; In Flames; Body Count; Life of Agony; Asking Alexandria; Butcher Babies; The Dead Daisies	My Dying Bride; Marduk; Cannibal Corpse; God Seed; Sigh; Aborted; Der Weg Einer Freiheit	Ihsahn; Samael; Evergrey; Sarke; Ne Obliviscaris; Blues Pills; Avatarium; King Hiss	Stray from the Path; Heidevolk; Set Things Right; Snot; In Hearts Wake

Saturday June 20
Main Stage 01	Main Stage 02	Marquee	Metal Dome	Jupiler Stage
Slipknot; KoЯn; Five Finger Death Punch; Godsmack; A Day to Remember; Hollywood Undead; Lower Than Atlantis	Judas Priest; Alice Cooper; Sonata Arctica; Exodus; Danko Jones; Orchid	At the Gates; Arch Enemy; Korpiklaani; Vallenfyre; Kataklysm; Morgoth; Orphaned Land	Alcest; Primordial; Lacuna Coil; The Ocean; Shining; The Haunted; Hawk Eyes	Every Time I Die; We Are Harlot; Code Orange; Chelsea Grin; Upon a Burning Body

Sunday June 21
Main Stage 01	Main Stage 02	Marquee	Metal Dome	Jupiler Stage
Scorpions; Motörhead; Airbourne; Black Stone Cherry; Tremonti; Pop Evil	Faith No More; Within Temptation; Lamb of God; Papa Roach; Parkway Drive; Betraying the Martyrs; Like a Storm	Cradle of Filth; Children of Bodom; Amorphis; Septicflesh; Sylosis; Winterfylleth; Den Saakaldte	DragonForce; FM; Equilibrium; Devilment; Evil Invaders; Battle Beast; Kobra and the Lotus	Terror; Texas in July; Counterparts; Motionless in White; The Charm The Fury

== Graspop Metal Meeting 2016 ==
Thursday June 16
Marquee	Jupiler Stage	Metal Dome
Dirkschneider; Primal Fear; Trivium	Eurostars Wrestling; Spoil Engine; Killer; Fleddy Melculy; Reject the Sickness	Your Highness; Bark; Knives to a Gunfight

Friday June 17
Main Stage 01	Main Stage 02	Marquee	Metal Dome	Jupiler Stage
Black Sabbath; Megadeth; Foreigner; Bad Religion; The Winery Dogs; Monster Truck	King Diamond; Amon Amarth; Disturbed; Heaven Shall Burn; Sixx:A.M. Soilwork; Firewind	Apocalyptica; Dark Funeral; Moonspell; Arcturus; Fleshgod Apocalypse; Carach Angren; Myrkur	Zakk Wylde; Amaranthe; Loudness; Virgin Steele; Grand Magus; Raven; Bloodbound	August Burns Red; Atreyu; Norma Jean; Turnstile; Monuments

Saturday June 18
Main Stage 01	Main Stage 02	Marquee	Metal Dome	Jupiler Stage
Volbeat; Slayer; Bullet for My Valentine; Testament; Skillet; Halestorm; Bliksem	Nightwish; Ghost; Dropkick Murphys; Killswitch Engage; Pennywise; Municipal Waste	Abbath; Gojira; Satyricon; Obituary; Paradise Lost; Shining; God Dethroned; Secrets of the Moon	Rival Sons; Tesseract; Kadavar; Slaves; Collibus; The Shrine	Anti-Flag; Beartooth; Skindred; Burning Down Alaska

Sunday June 19
Main Stage 01	Main Stage 02	Marquee	Metal Dome	Jupiler Stage
Iron Maiden; Anthrax; Saxon; Tremonti; Shinedown; The Raven Age	Twisted Sister; Trivium; Powerwolf; Sick of It All; Overkill; Delain	Behemoth; Sacred Reich; Steak Number Eight; Legion of the Damned; Moonsorrow; Enthroned; In the Woods... Sikth	La Muerte; Oomph! Obscura; Crobot; The Algorithm; The Midnight Ghost Train	The Amity Affliction; We Came as Romans; Bury Tomorrow; Thy Art Is Murder; Wild Lies

== Graspop Metal Meeting 2017 ==
Thursday June 15
Marquee	Metal Dome	Jupiler Stage
Brides of Lucifer; Slayensemble; The Covering; Pawns of Christ	Thurisaz; King Hiss; Wolves Scream; Hexa Mera	Born from Pain; Off the Cross; Bear; Carnation

Friday June 16
Main Stage 01	Main Stage 02	Marquee	Metal Dome	Jupiler Stage
Rammstein; Europe; Dee Snider; Black Star Riders; Blue Öyster Cult; Battle Beast; Slydigs	Emperor; Epica; Sepultura; Metal Church; Comeback Kid; Evil Invaders	Brides of Lucifer; Tarja; Amenra; Sólstafir; Rotting Christ; Melechesh; Decapitated; Tribulation	The Dillinger Escape Plan; Alcest; Prong; Psychotic Waltz; King's X Sinistro; MaYaN	The Devil Wears Prada; Motionless in White; Northlane; Every Time I Die; As It Is; Shvpes

- Dee Snider replaced W.A.S.P.

Saturday June 17
Main Stage 01	Main Stage 02	Marquee	Metal Dome	Jupiler Stage
Deep Purple; Alter Bridge; Gojira; Danko Jones; Rhapsody; Axel Rudi Pell	In Flames; Five Finger Death Punch; A Day to Remember; Max & Iggor Cavalera: Return to Roots; Architects; DevilDriver; Avatar	Ministry; Amorphis; Mayhem; Devin Townsend Project; Sanctuary; Subrosa	Helmet; Monster Magnet; Clutch; Red Fang; Coheed and Cambria; Baroness; Toseland	Of Mice & Men; While She Sleeps; Code Orange; Crown the Empire; As Lions

Sunday June 18
Main Stage 01	Main Stage 02	Marquee	Metal Dome	Jupiler Stage
Scorpions; Evanescence; Steel Panther; Airbourne; Ugly Kid Joe; The Raven Age	Sabaton; Rob Zombie; Mastodon; Hatebreed; Alestorm; The Charm The Fury	Primus; Opeth; Anathema; Graveyard; Kvelertak; The Black Dahlia Murder; Memoriam; The Monolith Deathcult	Queensrÿche; Gotthard; The Dead Daisies; Hardline; Grave Digger; Like a Storm; Inglorious	Sum 41; Suicidal Tendencies; Suicide Silence; Chelsea Grin; Touché Amoré; Hacktivist

== Graspop Metal Meeting 2018 ==
In 2018 the Festival will have 4 full days and was completely sold out for the first time in its existence.

Thursday June 21
Main Stage 01	Main Stage 02	Marquee	Metal Dome	Jupiler Stage
Guns N' Roses; Jonathan Davis; Black Stone Cherry; The Pink Slips	Ghost; Iced Earth; Doro Pesch	-	Kataklysm; Dool; Heilung; Toxic Shock; Moments; Signs of Algorithm	Madball; Fleddy Melculy; Bury Tomorrow; Cancer Bats; Follow the Cipher

Friday June 22
Main Stage 01	Main Stage 02	Marquee	Metal Dome	Jupiler Stage
Iron Maiden; Killswitch Engage; Powerwolf; Shinedown; Avatar; Tyler Bryant & The Shakedown	Parkway Drive; Avenged Sevenfold; Hollywood Undead; Tremonti; Stick to Your Guns; Diablo Blvd	Ayreon; Watain; Vader; Septicflesh; Carach Angren; Arkona; Akercocke; Galactic Empire	Neurosis; Wolves in the Throne Room; The Darkness; Pist.On; In This Moment; Zeal & Ardor; The Raven Age; Savage Messiah	Less Than Jake; Anti-Flag; L7; Silverstein; Culture Abuse

Saturday June 23
Main Stage 01	Main Stage 02	Marquee	Metal Dome	Jupiler Stage
Volbeat; Rise Against; Arch Enemy; Skillet; Vixen; Backyard Babies	Marilyn Manson; Megadeth; Kreator; Accept; Asking Alexandria; Seether; Stray from the Path	Bloodbath; At the Gates; Marduk; Exodus; Amaranthe; Asphyx; Batushka; Bölzer	Baroness; Sons of Apollo; Kadavar; Planet of Zeus; The Vintage Caravan; Thundermother; Stone Broken	Underoath; Miss May I Crossfaith; Boston Manor; Our Hollow, Our Home*

Sunday June 24
Main Stage 01	Main Stage 02	Marquee	Metal Dome	Jupiler Stage
Ozzy Osbourne; Hollywood Vampires; Limp Bizkit; Billy Talent; Eisbrecher; Vandenberg's Moonkings	A Perfect Circle; Judas Priest; Bullet for My Valentine; Body Count feat. Ice-T; Powerflo; Pro-Pain	Meshuggah; Dead Cross; Corrosion of Conformity; Lacuna Coil; Carnivore A.D. Shining (SE); Týr; Mantar	The Bloody Beetroots; Perturbator; Skindred; Tesseract; The Contortionist; Eskimo Callboy; Ego Kill Talent	Thy Art Is Murder; Emmure; Blessthefall; Knocked Loose; Modern Life Is War; Employed to Serve

(*) Replacing P.O.D.

== Graspop Metal Meeting 2019 ==
Thursday June 20
Marquee	Metal Dome	Jupiler Stage
Philip Anselmo & The Illegals; Sonata Arctica; Aborted; Raven	Off the Cross; Concealed Reality; Hemelbestormer	The Amity Affliction; Beartooth; Nasty; Black Peaks

Friday June 21
Main Stage 01	Main Stage 02	Marquee	Metal Dome	Jupiler Stage
Within Temptation; Lynyrd Skynyrd; Architects; Glenn Hughes; Eisbrecher; Like a Storm	Slayer; Amon Amarth; Anthrax; Testament; Hatebreed; Death Angel	Stone Temple Pilots; Eagles of Death Metal; Children of Bodom; Cult of Luna; Candlemass; Crowbar; Whitechapel; Wiegedood	Mysticum; Starset; Carpenter Brut; Deathstars; Combichrist; Candlebox; The Hu	Discharge; Fever 333; Municipal Waste; Bleed from Within; To the Rats and Wolves

Saturday June 22
Main Stage 01	Main Stage 02	Marquee	Metal Dome	Jupiler Stage
Slipknot; Disturbed; Slash ft. Myles Kennedy and the Conspirators; Behemoth; Three Days Grace; Bad Wolves	Lamb of God; Godsmack; Trivium; Halestorm; HammerFall; Gloryhammer	King Diamond; Ministry; Clutch; Legion of the Damned; Borknagar; Immolation; Ne Obliviscaris; Cellar Darling	Demons and Wizards; Krokus; UFO; Phil Campbell and the Bastard Sons; Grand Magus; Beast in Black; Lovebites	Refused; No Fun at All; Agnostic Front; Taking Back Sunday; State Champs

Sunday June 23
Main Stage 01	Main Stage 02	Marquee	Metal Dome	Jupiler Stage
KISS; Def Leppard; Whitesnake; Gojira; Deadland Ritual; FM	Sabaton; Rob Zombie; In Flames; Delain; Inglorious	Carcass; Cradle of Filth; Eluveitie; Possessed; Insomnium; Fleshgod Apocalypse; Equilibrium; Skálmöld	Hawkwind; Kvelertak; Uncle Acid and the Deadbeats; Living Colour; Nashville Pussy; Orange Goblin; Crisix	Sick of It All; While She Sleeps; Terror; Born from Pain; Power Trip

== Graspop Metal Meeting 2020 (cancellation) ==
In 2020 the festival planned to organise the 25th edition. Therefore, they would have celebrated it as a full 4-day festival. Bands intended to perform included Iron Maiden, Judas Priest, Aerosmith, Mercyful Fate, Disturbed, Faith No More, Killing Joke, The Offspring, Korn, Airbourne and others. On 15 April 2020, the festival announced on its Facebook page that the 2020 edition would be cancelled because of the ongoing COVID-19 pandemic. The festival was rescheduled to 2021, and then again rescheduled to 2022 because of the ongoing pandemic in 2021.

== Graspop Metal Meeting 2022 ==
Thursday June 16
South Stage	North Stage	Marquee	Metal Dome	Jupiler Stage
Iron Maiden; Powerwolf; Tremonti; Battle Beast	Volbeat; Dropkick Murphys; Mastodon; Beartooth; While She Sleeps	Mercyful Fate; Stake; Death To All; In Extremo; Flotsam And Jetsam; Vltimas; MysÞyrming	Baroness; High On Fire; Enthroned; Celeste; Lalma; Toxic Shock; Strains; The Curse Of Millhaven	Suicidal Tendencies; Slapshot; Deez Nuts; Ego Kill Talent; Creeper; Trash Boat; Dana Dentata

Friday June 17
South Stage	North Stage	Marquee	Metal Dome	Jupiler Stage
Scorpions; Whitesnake; A Day To Remember; Bullet For My Valentine; Steel Panther; Beyond The Black	Within Temptation; Megadeth; Heaven Shall Burn; Black Label Society; Gloryhammer; Phil Campbell & The Bastard Sons Plays Motörhead	Heilung; Amenra; Paradise Lost; Alcest; Angelus Apatrida; Gaahls Wyrd; Dool; Disillusion	Perturbator; Zeal & Ardor; Twin Temple; The Vintage Caravan; Sloper; British Lion; Tempt	Stick To Your Guns; Jinjer; Employed To Serve; Our Hollow, Our Home; Ghostkid; As Everything Unfolds

Saturday June 18
South Stage	North Stage	Marquee	Metal Dome	Jupiler Stage
Judas Priest; Saxon; Foreigner; Europe; Michael Schenker; Majestica	Korn; Five Finger Death Punch; Shinedown; Eisbrecher; Blues Pills; Kontrust	Opeth; Devin Townsend; Down; Ihsahn; Decapitated; Dying Fetus; Tribulation; Imminence	Myles Kennedy And Company; Red Fang; Ugly Kid Joe; Fleddy Melculy; Smash Into Pieces; Massive Wagons; Killthelogo	Lagwagon; Good Riddance; Walls Of Jericho; Counterparts; Boston Manor; Cemetery Sun

Sunday June 19
South Stage	North Stage	Marquee	Metal Dome	Jupiler Stage
Sabaton; Deep Purple; Alice Cooper; Skillet; Rival Sons; Thunder	Deftones; The Offspring; Alestorm; Evil Invaders; Crossfaith	Dimmu Borgir; Amorphis; Sepultura; Tiamat; Destruction; The Great Old Ones; Bütcher; Naglfar	Fu Manchu; Kadavar; Me And That Man; Tyler Bryant & The Shakedown; Wayward Sons; Dirty Honey	Dog Eat Dog; Suicide Silence; Bury Tomorrow; Fire From The Gods; Spiritbox; InVisions

== Graspop Metal Meeting 2023 ==
Thursday June 15
South Stage	North Stage	Marquee	Metal Dome	Jupiler Stage
Guns N' Roses; Alter Bridge; Papa Roach; Tom Morello; Mammoth WVH	Ghost; Arch Enemy; Epica; Spiritbox; Beast in Black	Cradle Of Filth; My Dying Bride; At The Gates; Septicflesh; Marduk; Butcher Babies; Orbit Culture	Carpenter Brut; The Winery Dogs; Symphony X Evergrey; The Raven Age; Escape The Fate; Haken; Molybaron	As I Lay Dying; Sick Of It All; Motionless In White; Agnostic Front; Unearth; Stray From The Path; Cancer Bats; End

Friday June 16
South Stage	North Stage	Marquee	Metal Dome	Jupiler Stage
Machine Head; Disturbed; Behemoth; Airbourne; Fever 333; Thundermother	Gojira; Amon Amarth; Hatebreed; Asking Alexandria; Pro-Pain; Blind Channel	Meshuggah; Watain; Delain; Municipal Waste; Finntroll; Heidevolk; Crowbar; Vanaheim	VV; Clutch; Orange Goblin; The Answer; Planet of Zeus; Legion of Doom; Any Given Day; Black Mirrors	Hollywood Undead; Ice Nine Kills; The Amity Affliction; Palaye Royale; Landmvrks; Blackgold; Loathe; Fatal Move

Saturday June 17
South Stage	North Stage	Marquee	Metal Dome	Jupiler Stage
Slipknot; Pantera; Architects; Halestorm; I Prevail; Nothing More	Parkway Drive; Rancid; In Flames; The Ghost Inside; Skindred; Vended	Testament; Korpiklaani; Dark Angel; Legion of the Damned; Suicidal Angels; Cyclone; Schizophrenia; Noctem	Solstafir; Eivor; Soen; Sleep Token; Infected Rain; Antimatter; Heriot; Oceans	Life Of Agony; Less Than Jake; The Chats; Code Orange; Danko Jones; The Menzingers; Cane Hill; Mimi Barks

Sunday June 18
South Stage	North Stage	Marquee	Metal Dome	Jupiler Stage
Def Leppard; Hollywood Vampires; Three Days Grace; Dirkschneider; Elegant Weapons; Eclipse	Mötley Crüe; Generation Sex; Avatar; Skid Row; Kissin' Dynamite	Kreator; Eluveitie; The Halo Effect; Katatonia; Insomnium; Carnation; Dieth; Hippotraktor	Monster Magnet; Lorna Shore; Voivod; Hellmut Lotti Goes Metal; Deathstars; Greg Puciato; Polaris; Paledusk	Billy Talent; Enter Shikari; Anti-Flag; Lionheart; Chelsea Grin; Bloodywood; Stand Atlantic; The Luka State

== Graspop Metal Meeting 2024 ==
Thursday 20 June
South Stage	North Stage	Marquee	Metal Dome	Jupiler Stage
Tool; Megadeth; Kerry King; Stake; Silverstein; Solence	Alice Cooper; Babymetal; Doro; Amaranthe; Dominum	Polyphia +++ (Crosses); Kvelertak; Textures; Asinhell; Shadow of Intent; Dying Wish; Brothers of Metal	All Them Witches; Ne Obliviscaris; Hanabie. Health; Alien Weaponry; Casey; Night Verses	Max & Igorr Cavalera; Underoath; Comeback Kid; Counterparts; Bury Tomorrow; Bleed From Within; Erra

Friday 21 June
South Stage	North Stage	Marquee	Metal Dome	Jupiler Stage
5FDP; Turnstile; Avantasia; Fear Factory; P.O.D. Lansdowne	Judas Priest; Electric Callboy; Bruce Dickinson; Hammerfall; Brian Downey's Alive and Dangerous; Dynazty	Pendulum; Tarja; Nile; Vltimas; Dying Fetus; Borknagar Brand of Sacrifice; Svartsot	Graveyard; Fu Manchu; Kadavar; High on Fire; The Vintage Caravan; Khemmis; Until I Wake	Biohazard; Thursday; Fit for a King; Deez Nuts; The Acacia Strain; Drug Church; GEL

Saturday 22 June
South Stage	North Stage	Marquee	Metal Dome	Jupiler Stage
Bring Me The Horizon; Limp Bizkit; While She Sleeps; Mammoth WVH; Ice Nine Kills; Fleddy Melculy	Avenged Sevenfold; Architects; Mr. Bungle; Steel Panther; Flotsam and Jetsam; Spoil Engine	Abbath; I Am Morbid; Kampfar; Rotting Christ; Batushka; Pestilence; Suffocation; Pest Control	Wolfmother; Brutus; Empire State Bastard; Pain; Vola; DeathbyRomy; Defects	Kamelot; Blind Guardian; Uriah Heep; Glenn Hughes; Frog Leap; Red; Iron Allies

Sunday 23 June
South Stage	North Stage	Marquee	Metal Dome	Jupiler Stage
Scorpions; Corey Taylor; Rival Sons; Extreme; The Last Internationale	Machine Head; Deep Purple; Body Count; Black Stone Cherry; Atreyu; John Coffey	Emperor; Dark Funeral; The Black Dahlia Murder; Ereb Altor; Ihsahn; Crystal Lake; Sanguisugabogg; Wargasm	Igorrr; Karnivool; Crownshift; Vukovi; Dream State; Skynd; Future Palace	Thy Art Is Murder; Slaughter to Prevail; Of Mice & Men; Malevolence; Make Them Suffer; Better Lovers; Zulu

== Graspop Metal Meeting 2025 ==
Thursday June 19
South Stage	North Stage	Marquee	Metal Dome	Jupiler Stage
Iron Maiden; Dream Theater; Motionless In White; Landmvrks; Municipal Waste	Powerwolf; Epica; Alestorm; Beast in Black; Warkings	Hatebreed; Carcass; Orbit Culture; Paradise Lost; Soen; Death Angel; Signs Of The Swarm; Psychonaut	Mass Hysteria; Perturbator; Julie Christmas; Hot Milk; Charlotte Wessels; The Raven Age; Deafheaven	Lagwagon; Stick To Your Guns; Yellowcard; Terror; Alien Ant Farm; Trash Boat; Fleshwater

Friday June 20
South Stage	North Stage	Marquee	Metal Dome	Jupiler Stage
Slipknot; Falling In Reverse; The Ghost Inside; Knocked Loose; Pro-Pain; Dead Poet Society	Behemoth; Skillet; Jerry Cantrell; Gloryhammer; Myles Kennedy; British Lion	Opeth; Blood Incantation; Eagles Of Death Metal; Orange Goblin; Green Lung; Windhand; Bloodhunter; Spectral Wound	Dethklok; Smash Into Pieces; Nova Twins; Kim Dracula; Unprocessed; Villagers of Ioannina City; As Everything Unfolds	Jinjer; Me First & The Gimme Gimmes; Polaris; Northlane; Employed to Serve; House of Protection; Static Dress

Saturday June 21
South Stage	North Stage	Marquee	Metal Dome	Jupiler Stage
Nine Inch Nails; Spiritbox; Brutus; Soulfly; Eisbrecher; Oomph!	Korn; Bullet for My Valentine; Lorna Shore; Poppy; Skindred; Kittie	Amenra; The Hu; Imminence; Carnation; Primordial; Sylosis; Whitechapel; Dødheimsgard	Apocalyptica; Starset; Grandson; Novelists; Unto Others; Self Deception; Vowws	Airbourne; Dragonforce; The Dead Daisies; The Warning; Vandenberg; Dirty Honey; Last Train

Sunday June 22
South Stage	North Stage	Marquee	Metal Dome	Jupiler Stage
Judas Priest; Savatage; Krokus; Beyond the Black; Ugly Kid Joe	Till Lindemann; In Flames; Heaven Shall Burn; Power Trip; Nothing More; Crossfaith	King Diamond; Triptykon; Sacred Reich; Paleface Swiss; Fit for an Autopsy; Massacre; Angelus Apatrida; Amira Elfeky	Alcest; Katatonia; Cobra the Impaler; Dayseeker; Halocene; Creeper; Aviva	Thrice; Stray from the Path; Currents; Speed; Rise of the Northstar; Sim; Seven Hours After Violet

== Graspop Metal Meeting 2026 ==
Thursday June 18
South Stage	North Stage	Marquee	Metal Dome	Jupiler Stage
The Offspring; Within Temptation; A Day to Remember; Accept; Danko Jones; Ego Kill Talent	Limp Bizkit; Megadeth; ~~Tom Morello~~; Wind Rose; Bulls On Parade; Static-X; Mantah	Anthrax; Cult of Luna; Septicflesh; Wolves in the Throne Room; Gatecreeper; Snot; Dying Wish; Distant	President; Bloodywood; Lakeview; Sleep Theory; The Funeral Portrait; Ankor; Magnolia Park	The Dillinger Escape Plan; Pennywise; John Coffey; Grade 2 Thrown; Slay Squad; Blackgold

Friday June 19
South Stage	North Stage	Marquee	Metal Dome	Jupiler Stage
Volbeat; Alter Bridge; Sex Pistols & Frank Carter; Cavalera "Chaos A.D."; Triggerfinger; Quicksand	Knocked Loose; Breaking Benjamin; Trivium; Mammoth; ~~Drowning Pool~~; Infected Rain	Cradle of Filth; Death to All; Possessed; Old Man's Child; Suicidal Angels; Asomvel; Bark; Hulder	Leprous; Kadavar; Elder; Harakiri for the Sky; Oranssi Pazuzu; TX2; Vower	Lionheart; Kublai Khan TX; We Came as Romans; Drain; Guilt Trip; Letlive. Thornhill

Saturday June 20
South Stage	North Stage	Marquee	Metal Dome	Jupiler Stage
Bring Me The Horizon; Architects; Ice Nine Kills; Hollywood Undead; Malevolence; Fleddy Melculy	Bad Omens; Babymetal; Three Days Grace; Sepultura; P.O.D. The Pretty Wild	Six Feet Under; Moonspell; Corrosion of Conformity; Lacuna Coil; Terrorizer; Uada; Sinsaenum; Embryonic Autopsy	Tesseract; Uncle Acid & the Deadbeats; Catch your Breath; Loathe; Rivers of Nihil; Faetooth; Mouth Culture	Avatar; Queensrÿche; Sonata Arctica; Orden Ogan; Primal Fear; Feuerschwanz; Vicious Rumors

Sunday June 21
South Stage	North Stage	Marquee	Metal Dome	Jupiler Stage
Sabaton; Electric Callboy; Black Label Society; Extreme; Life of Agony; Battle Beast	Def Leppard; Alice Cooper; Foreigner; Europe; Evergrey	Mastodon; Venom; The Gathering; Kanonenfieber; Vltimas; Decapitated; Gaerea; Killus	Carpenter Brut; Sólstafir; Periphery; Future Palace; Rain City Drive; Zetra; Return to Dust	The Plot in You; Bury Tomorrow; Lagwagon; Set It Off; Wargasm; King 810; Kuazar

Due to a family emergency, Tom Morello was forced to cancel his performance. He got replaced by Bulls on Parade while Wind Rose moved up a spot. Drowning Pool was also forced to cancel their performance due to severe tour bus breakdowns while en route to the festival, causing massive travel delays. They did not get replaced, Infected Rain moved up a spot.

== Graspop Metal Meeting 2027 ==
Thursday June 17
South Stage	North Stage	Marquee	Metal Dome	Jupiler Stage
Parkway Drive	Helloween	The Sisters Of Mercy	Floor Jansen	Bad Religion

Friday June 18
South Stage	North Stage	Marquee	Metal Dome	Jupiler Stage
Evanescence	Faith No More	Brutus	Clutch	Suicidal Tendencies

Saturday June 19
South Stage	North Stage	Marquee	Metal Dome	Jupiler Stage
Blink-182	Marilyn Manson	Dimmu Borgir	Paradise Lost	

Sunday June 20
South Stage	North Stage	Marquee	Metal Dome	Jupiler Stage
Mötley Crüe	Slash ft. Myles Kennedy and the Conspirators	Children Of Bodom	Ghostemane	Comeback Kid
