= Arnhem Metal Meeting =

- Genre: Extreme metal
- Dates: December
- Locations: Arnhem, Netherlands
- Years active: 2004–2007
- Founders: TMR Music Promotions
- Website: arnhemmetalmeeting.nl

Arnhem Metal Meeting was a heavy metal festival held in Arnhem, Netherlands in 2004 to 2007. It was booked by TMR Music Promotions and took place at the Musis Sacrum in Arnhem.

The 2008 edition did not take place due to the organization costs. No further plans were made to hold the event in Arnhem. However, there was a 2009 follow-up edition in Eindhoven called Eindhoven Metal Meeting, which continued as a 2-day event from 2010 to recent time.

== Lineups ==
=== 2004 ===
Held on 4 December 2004.

- Samael
- Entombed
- Suffocation
- Unleashed
- Primordial
- Impaled Nazarene
- 1349
- Gorerotted
- God Dethroned
- Desaster
- Inhume
- Heidevolk

=== 2005 ===
Held on 26 November 2005.

- Destruction
- Candlemass
- Enslaved
- Dismember
- Ensiferum
- Grave
- Mercenary
- Thyrfing
- Totenmond
- Callenish Circle
- Leng Tch'e
- Officium Triste
- Volbeat
- Fluisterwoud

=== 2006 ===
Held on 9 December 2006.

- Arch Enemy
- Immolation
- Anathema
- Antaeus
- Necrophobic
- Tankard
- Melechesh
- Ancient Rites
- General Surgery
- Aeternus
- Moonsorrow
- Skyforger
- Pungent Stench
- Thronar
- Flesh Made Sin

=== 2007 ===
Held on 1 December 2007.

- Sodom
- Asphyx
- God Dethroned
- Hollenthon
- Marduk
- Unleashed
- Primordial
- Holy Moses
- Nifelheim
- Cruachan
- Haemorrhage
- Vreid
- Cypher
- Severe Torture
- Panchrysia
- Obsidian
