= In-Quest =

Belgian technical death metal band

- Origin: Turnhout, Belgium
- Genre: Progressive death metal
- Years active: 1994–2014
- Labels: Teutonic Existence Records, Shiver Records, Soulreaper Records, Good Life Recordings
- Members: MiQe Löfberg; Douglas Verhoeven; Gert Monden; Korneel Lauwereins; Frederick Peeters
- Past members: Noise Grinder; Sven de Caluwé; Laurent Swaan; Wim Roelants; Manu van Tichelen; Joël Decoster; Jan Geenen; Valéry Bottin
- Website: www.in-quest.be

In-Quest were a Belgian progressive death metal band. Formerly signed to Good Life Recordings, the band were active since the early 1990s, with Sven de Caluwe of Aborted as their singer from 2002 to 2004. He was replaced with Swedish singer Mike Löfberg from Blockhead. They released five albums and two EPs. Their final album, 8: The Odyssey Of Eternity, was released on 8 August 2013. The split up on 12 February 2014.

In-Quest played at a number of festivals in Belgium and the Netherlands, such as Frostrock, Euroblast, Xmass Festival, Flanders Fields of Death, Arnhem Metal Meeting, and (alongside bands like Slipknot, Fear Factory, Nile, Motörhead, Saxon, and Ensiferum) Graspop Metal Meeting in 2005 (Metal Dome), 2006 (Marquee 1) and 2009 (at Mainstage). Also in 2006, In-Quest opened for Fear Factory, on their "Fifteen Years of Fear" tour. They supported Nile in 2005 on their EU tour.

== Members ==
=== Final line-up ===
- Mike "MiQe" Löfberg - vocals (2004-2014)
- Gert Monden - drums (1994-2014)
- Douglas Verhoeven - lead guitar (1999-2014)
- Korneel "Korre" Lauwereins (bass 2007-2010) - rhythm guitar (2010-2014)

=== Previous members ===
Vocals

- NG "Noise Grinder" Ben Adams - vocals (1994–2002)
- Dimitri Janssens - vocals (2002)
- Sven de Caluwé - vocals (2002–2004)

Guitars

- Wim Roelants - guitar (1994-1999)
- Jan Geenen - bass/rhythm guitar (1992-2006)
- Ian van Gemeren - rhythm guitar (session) (2006)
- Valéry Bottin - rhythm guitar (session) (2006-2010)

Bass

- Manu van Tichelen - bass (1997-2005)
- Joël Decoster - bass (2005-2007)
- Jan Geenen - bass (1994-1997), guitar (1997-2006)
- Frederick Peeters - bass (2010-2013)

== "System Shit" line-up (1988–1994) ==
- Originally formed as Color Of Noise (1987) as a one-man-noise band,
- Laurent (Vocals, guitar, drums)

=== Final "System Shit" line-up (1994) ===
- NG "Noise Grinder" Ben Adams - vocals (1992-1994)
- Gert Monden - drums, backing vocals (1992–1994)
- Laurent Swaan - guitar (1988-1994), vocals (1988-1991)
- Jan Geenen - bass (1992-1994), drums (1991-1992)

=== Former "System Shit" members ===
- Peter Smeekens - Bass (1990 - 1991)
- Koen Smits - Bass (1991 - August 1993)
- Mark Nelissen - Drums (1990 - 1991)
- Peter Cornelissen - Guitars (1990)

== Discography ==
Studio albums

- Extrusion: Battlehymns (Teutonic Existence, 1997)
- Operation: Citadel (Shiver Records, 1999)
- Epileptic (Good Life Recordings, 2004)
- The Comatose Quandaries (Dockyard1, Good Life Recordings, 2005)
- Made Out Of Negative Matter (Self-released, 2009)
- CHRONiQLE (The best of...compilation) (Self-released, 2012)
- Chapter IIX - The Odyssey of Eternity (Self-released, 2013)

Extended plays

- Destination: Pyroclasm (Soulreaper Records, 2003)
- The Liquidation Files (Vinyl EP, Self-released, 2010)

Demos

- Xylad Valox (1995)

7inch vinyl

- Rewarded with Ingratitude (1995)
