= Black Mirrors =

Belgian rock band

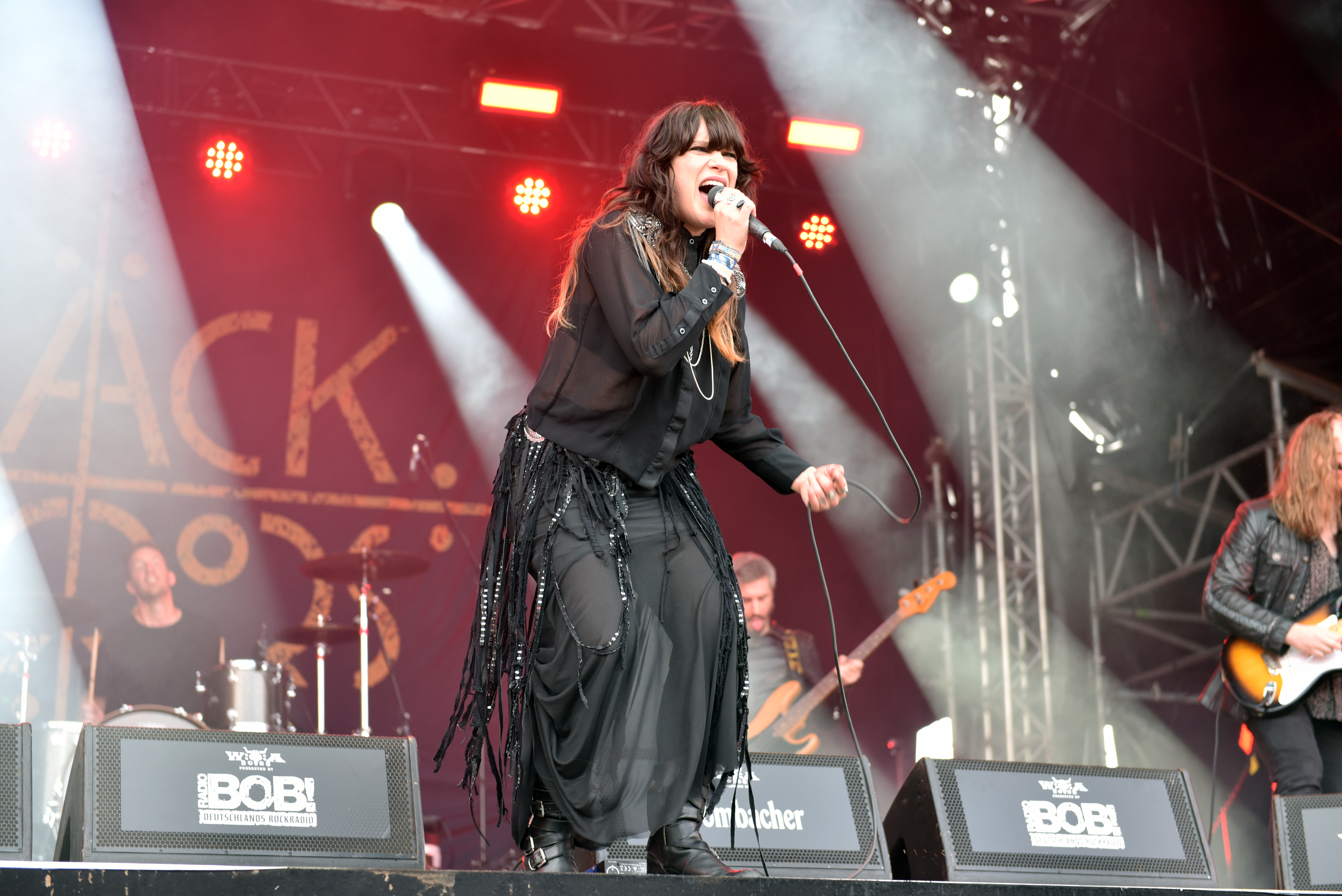
- Black Mirrors at Wacken Open Air 2023

Background information
- Origin: Brussels, Belgium
- Genres: Blues rock; garage rock
- Years active: 2013-present
- Label: Napalm Records
- Members: Marcella Di Troia; Pierre Lateur; Gino Capon; Edouard Cabuy

Black Mirrors is a Belgian rock band formed in Brussels in 2013.

== History ==
In the summer of 2013, singer Marcella Di Troia wanted to start an all-female band. She quickly found a drummer and a bassist, but finding a suitable guitarist turned out to be difficult. After failing to find a suitable candidate, Pierre Lateur joined the band. After a few jam sessions, the band wanted to start investing more time and writing their own songs. The drummer and bassist then left the band due to lack of time. As replacements, the remaining members brought in two musician friends, Gino Capon and Edouard Cabuy. At the end of 2013, the band played their first concerts and recorded their debut EP. The untitled EP was self-released a year later.

In 2015, the Black Mirrors played at the Out and Loud festival. Although Di Troia found the performance to be “pretty shitty”, the Austrian record label Napalm Records became aware of the band. The band and label stayed in contact. A year later, the band recorded their second EP and was signed by Napalm Records and the management of the band Blues Pills. Funky Queen was released on 3 March 2017 and, in addition to three original compositions, also contains a cover version of the MC5 song Kick Out the Jams. The band then went on a European tour supporting Horisont.

In October 2017, the Black Mirrors played at the Crossroads Festival in Bonn. WDR recorded the concert and later broadcast it on the Rockpalast program. The band then recorded their debut album. Look into the Black Mirror was released on 31 August 2018 and debuted at number 114 in the Wallonia and number 186 in the Flemish album charts. In autumn 2018, the band played a European tour as support for The Vintage Caravan and The Night Flight Orchestra.

Black Mirrors announced that their second studio album Tomorrow Will Be Without Us would be released on 4 November 2022.

== Musical style ==
While the band's music on the first EP was still heavily influenced by Radiohead, Black Mirrors has been listed in the blues rock and garage rock genres. Ralfi Ralf from the online magazine Metal-Heads.de described the Black Mirrors' music as a wild mixture of Anouk and Janis Joplin, paired with the music of Nirvana and the Queens of the Stone Age. Marcella Di Troia also names Jack White, Led Zeppelin and Jimi Hendrix as influences.

== Discography ==
=== Studio albums ===
- Look into the Black Mirror (2018)
- Tomorrow Will Be Without Us (2022)

=== EPs ===
- 2014: Black Mirrors
- 2017: Funky Queen

=== Music videos ===
- 2017: Funky Queen
- 2018: Günter Kimmich
- 2018: Moonstone
- 2022: Hateful Hate, I’ll Kill You
