= Diablo Blvd =

Belgian rock band

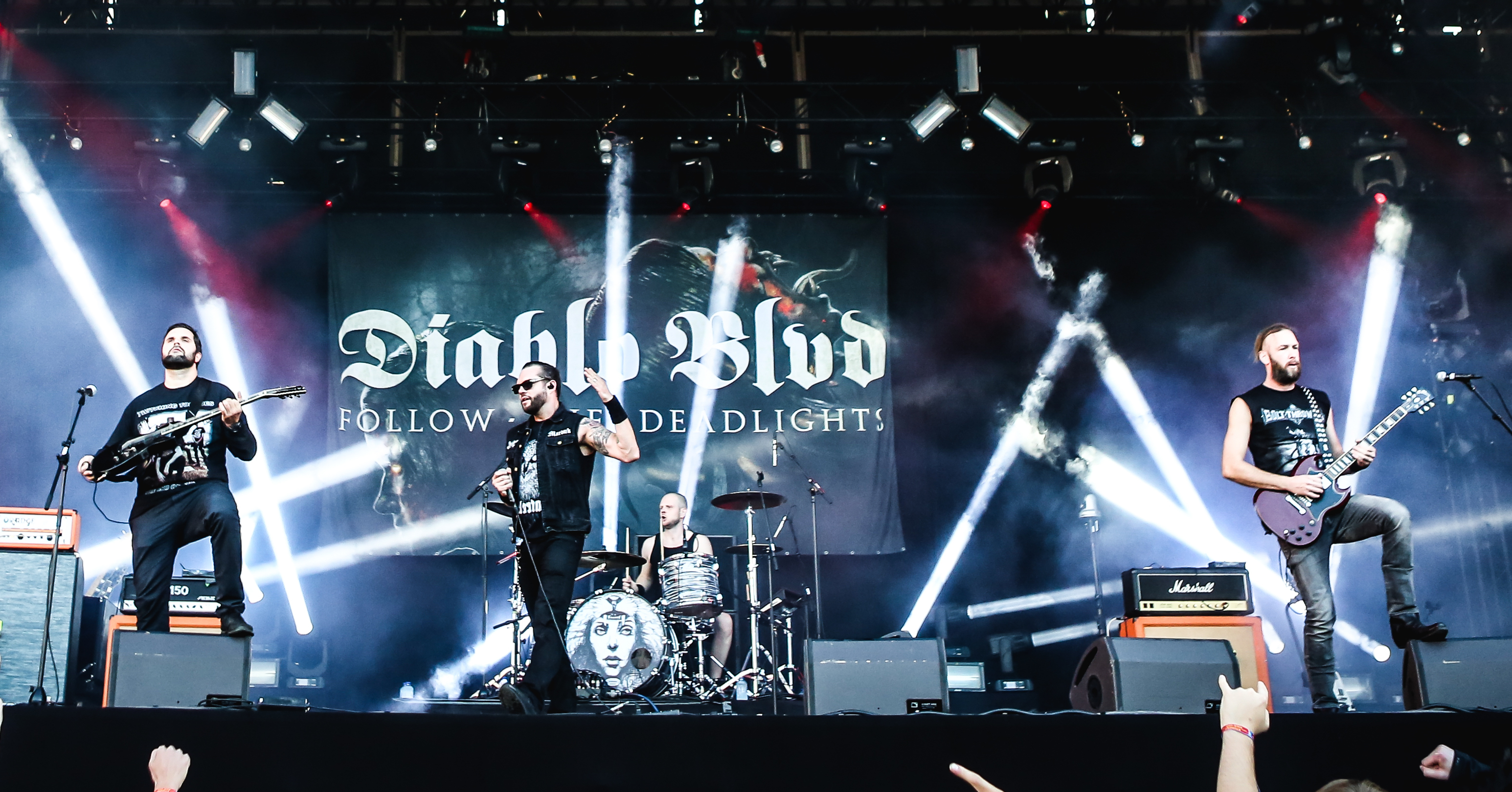
- Diablo Blvd performing in 2015

Background information
- Origin: Antwerp, Belgium
- Genres: Heavy metal, hard rock
- Years active: 2005–2018
- Labels: Sony Music Belgium, Nuclear Blast
- Members: Alex Agnew (vocals); Andries Beckers (guitar); Tim Bekaert (guitar); Kris Martens (drums)
- Past members: Dave Hubrechts
- Website: diabloblvd.be

Diablo Blvd was a Belgian hard rock/heavy metal band founded in 2005.

== History ==
Diablo Blvd was founded in 2005 by vocalist Alex Agnew, known as a successful stand-up comedian in Benelux and guitarist Dave Hubrechts. The band was completed by guitarist and songwriter Andries Beckers from Born from Pain, bassist Tim Bekaert from A Brand and drummer Kris Martens from Tangled Horns.

In 2006, the band released the demo Scarred and Undefeated on cassette and signed a contract with PIAS (Play It Again Sam).

Over a period of two years, Diablo Blvd was working on their debut album The Greater God, which was produced by Ace Zec. The album reached No. 33 in the Belgian album charts in 2009. The band started playing at mainstream festivals in Belgium such as Graspop Metal Meeting and Pukkelpop.

In 2011 they released their second studio album Builders of Empires, mixed by Swedish producer Jens Bogren. The album debuted at #21 in the Belgian album charts. The single "Black Heart Bleed" still builds to almost anthemic proportions at every live show they play. They shot their first music video for the song "Saint of Killers", which is based on a fictional character who appears in the acclaimed comic book series Preacher.

In May 2014, their third studio album Follow the Deadlights was released by Sony Music and went up to No. 3 in the Belgian album charts. The album was recorded in the ICP Studio in Brussels and mixed by Jay Ruston and mastered by Paul Logus who both have previously been behind the sound of Anthrax, Stone Sour, Meat Loaf and Steel Panther.

In November 2014, Diablo Blvd signed a worldwide deal with Nuclear Blast. CEO Markus Staiger was loudly impressed with the song "Rise Like Lions". Follow the Deadlights was released by Nuclear Blast on January 23, 2015. Dave Hubrechts left the band and Tim Bekaert switched to guitar. At the same time, the band played in clubs and festivals during a European promotion tour of 17 months as well as opening act for Epica, Machine Head, Ace Frehley and Life of Agony in the US.

On 28 June 2018, it was announced the band would be breaking up following several shows to take place throughout the rest of the year, with the final show taking place on December 10 at the Ancienne Belgique.

== Discography ==
=== Albums ===
- 2009: The Greater God
- 2011: Builders of Empires
- 2014: Follow the Deadlights
- 2017: Zero Hour

=== Demos ===
- 2006: Scarred and Undefeated

=== Singles ===
- 2011: Black Heart Bleed
- 2013: Rise Like Lions
- 2014: Beyond the Veil, Follow the Deadlights, Son of Cain

=== Music videos ===
- 2011: "Saint of Killers"
- 2014: "Follow the Deadlights"
- 2014: "Son of Cain"
