= Saille =

Black metal band

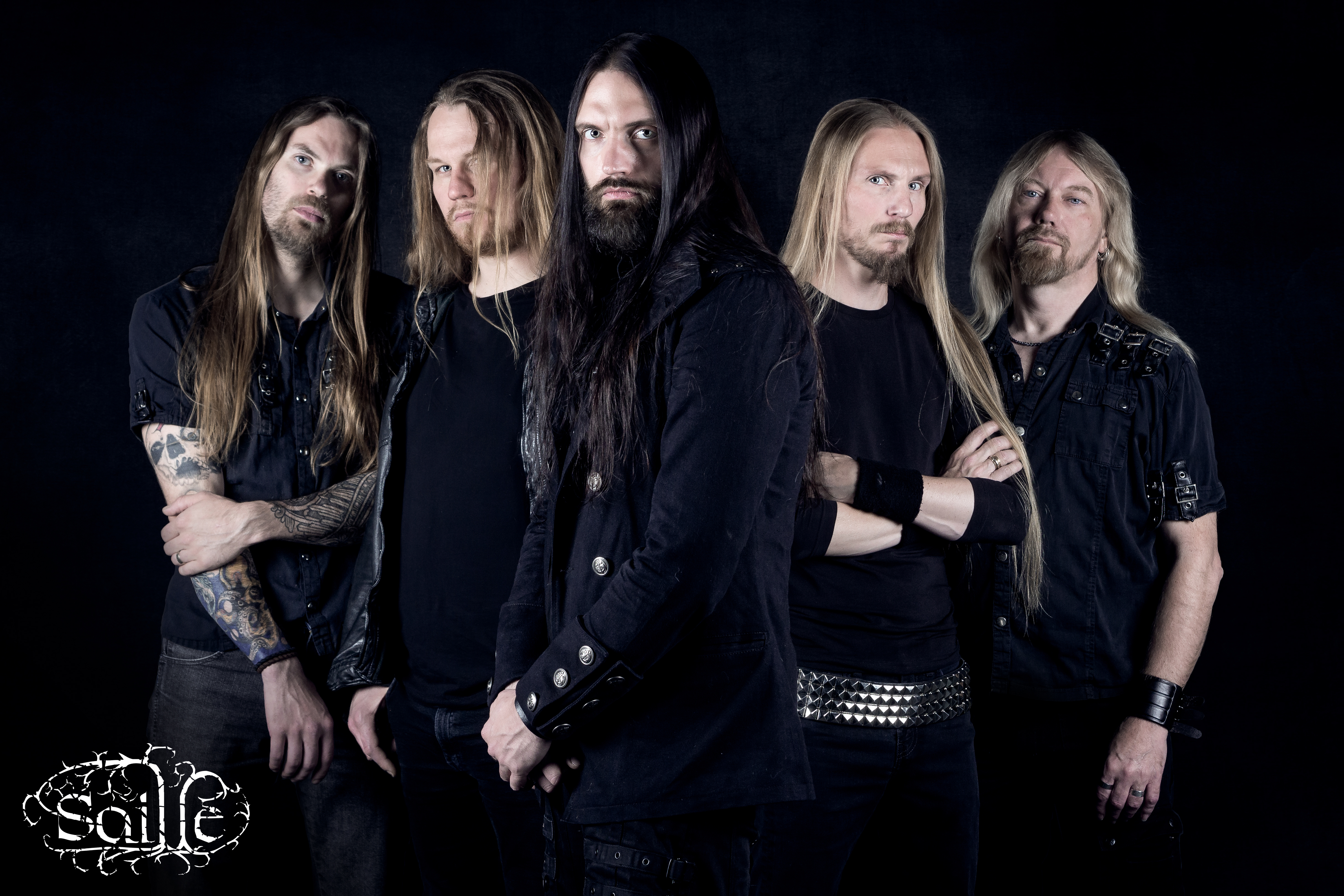
- Saille in 2018 Left to right: Yoeri Gemeen, Guillaume Singer, Xavier De Schuyter, Kristof Van Iseghem and Reinier Schenk.

Background information
- Origin: Spain, Netherlands and Belgium
- Genres: Symphonic black metal
- Years active: 2009–present
- Labels: Code666 Records/Aural Music, Black Lion Records
- Members: Reiner Schenk; Kristof Van Iseghem; Juanjo Pérez; Jesse Peetoom; Tony Van Den Eynde
- Past members: Yves Callaert; Gert Monden; Didier Vancampo; Jonathan Vanderwal; Dries Gaerdelen; Dennie Grondelaers; Kevin De Leener; Collin Boone; Yoeri Gemeen; Xavier De Schuyter; Guillaume Singer
- Website: sailleofficial.com

Saille is a Belgian black metal band formed in 2009. The band uses classical instruments as well as traditional black metal instruments. Saille has released five studio albums till to date.

== History ==
=== Formation (2009-2010) ===
Saille started as a one-person, one-time project by Dries Gaerdelen (keyboards). During the recording of the debut album in 2009–2010, the idea of a live band grew on him, and a complete band was formed in the summer of 2010.

=== Irreversible Decay (2011) ===
Recording for the first album, Irreversible Decay, began in late 2009 at Shumcot Studio, Belgium. The album was completed in September 2010 and released on March 4, 2011, on the Italian label Code666 records.

Live shows for the album concluded with a spot at Belgium's biggest metal festival, Graspop Metal Meeting, in June 2012. In December 2012, Saille appeared at Eindhoven Metal Meeting (EMM).

=== Ritu (2013) ===
In July 2012, the band hit the Shumcot Studio again to record their second album Ritu. With lyrics inspired by death rites in ancient cultures, this album had a much darker setting than the first. Again, classically skilled guest musicians were invited. After two months of intensive recording sessions, the final mix was finished in September 2012 and sent to the Norwegian mastering specialist Tom Kvålsvoll (Strype Audio), who was known for mastering classic black metal bands including Mayhem, Emperor, Arcturus, Limbonic Art, Ulver, and Vreid.

Ritu was released as a digipak edition on 18 January 2013. Saille then faced an intensive year. That month they embarked on their first tour with the Transylvanian black metal band Negura Bunget, which was followed by more gigs in Belgium and the Netherlands, supporting bands like Textures, Von, Winterfylleth and The Monolith Death Cult. A promotional/official video for the opening track of the album Blood Libel was set for release in June 2013. During the summer, Saille was invited to perform at several festivals including Antwerp Metal Fest (with Napalm Death), Vlamrock (with Exhumed, Belphegor, and Rotting Christ) and Metal Méan (with Marduk and Dying Fetus). In September, they went to the UK for some gigs supporting Winterfylleth, a British band they considered friends since they first met at Graspop in 2012. The band then released another official video, a live recording of the track Tephra captured at Metal Méan in November 2013 and went to Denmark for a headlining spot at Black Winter Fest in Copenhagen.

=== Eldritch (2014) ===
Saille continued to play live gigs while they started recording their third album Eldritch in May 2014. These included Tongeren Metal Fest (with Asphyx and Angel Witch), a show supporting Carach Angren in the Netherlands, and the Ancienne Belgique with Mayhem (from Norway). In July, they played in Germany for the first time. The album was recorded in different studios to get a different approach for each group of instruments. Again, classical instruments including a grand piano, a 100-year-old pianola, and small vocal choirs were recorded. Mixing and mastering were handled by Klas Blomgren from Sweden (known for his work for Svart's last CD).

Eldritch was released on 10 November, again by the label Code666, as a digipak edition. To promote the release, a three-day promotion tour with Winterfylleth took place in Belgium and the Netherlands. The band's second performance at Eindhoven Metal Meeting concluded the year.

In 2015, Saille experienced significant growth in terms of important performances. They shared stages with bands including Moonspell, Septicflesh, Eye of Solitude, Impaled Nazarene, Nargaroth, Dødheimsgard, Thulcandra, and Cradle of Filth. In May, they participated in a tour supporting Negura Bunget, visiting France and Spain for the first time. During the summer, they performed at festivals in Molins de Rei/Barcelona, Spain, in June; at the British Bloodstock Open Air; and in Austria in August. An official videoclip for the track "Aklo" was released in August 2015.

This continued throughout 2016 but mainly focused on Germany: Saille played at Dark Easter Metal Meeting (Munich) in March, Ragnarök Festival (Lichtenfels) in April, and Summer Breeze Open Air in August. In between, they also did a show at Incineration Fest in London.

=== Gnosis (2017) ===
During September 2016, Saille announced that they were recording their fourth album, Gnosis. After some significant line-up changes, the band decided to continue as a five-piece. The album was mixed and mastered by the Wiesławscy brothers at Hertz Studio, Poland and released on 17 March 2017.

=== V (2021) ===
Saille's fifth studio album, V, was released on 9 April 2021. It is the band's first release on Black Lion Records.

== Band members ==
=== Current members ===
- Reinier Schenk - guitars (2009 - present)
- Kristof Van Iseghem - bass (2014 - present)
- Juanjo Pérez - guitars (2019 - present)
- Jesse Peetoom - vocals (2019 - present)
- Tony Van Den Eynde - drums (2021 - present)

=== Former members ===
- Yves Callaert - guitars (2010 - 2012)
- Gert Monden - drums (2009 - 2013)
- Didier Vancampo - bass (2010 - 2014)
- Jonathan Vanderwal - guitars (2009 - 2016); vocals (2009 - 2011)
- Dries Gaerdelen - keyboards, theremin (2009 - 2016)
- Dennie Grondelaers - vocals (2012 - 2017)
- Kevin De Leener - drums (2013 - 2017)
- Collin Boone - guitars (2016 - 2018)
- Yoeri Gemeen - drums (2017 - 2019)
- Xavier De Schuyter - vocals (2017 - 2019)
- Guillaume Singer - guitars (2018 - 2019)

== Discography ==
- 2011 - Irreversible Decay - Code666 Records
- 2013 - Ritu - Code666 Records
- 2014 - Eldritch - Code666 Records
- 2017 - Gnosis - Code666 Records
- 2021 - V - Black Lion Records
