= The Midnight Ghost Train =

American rock band

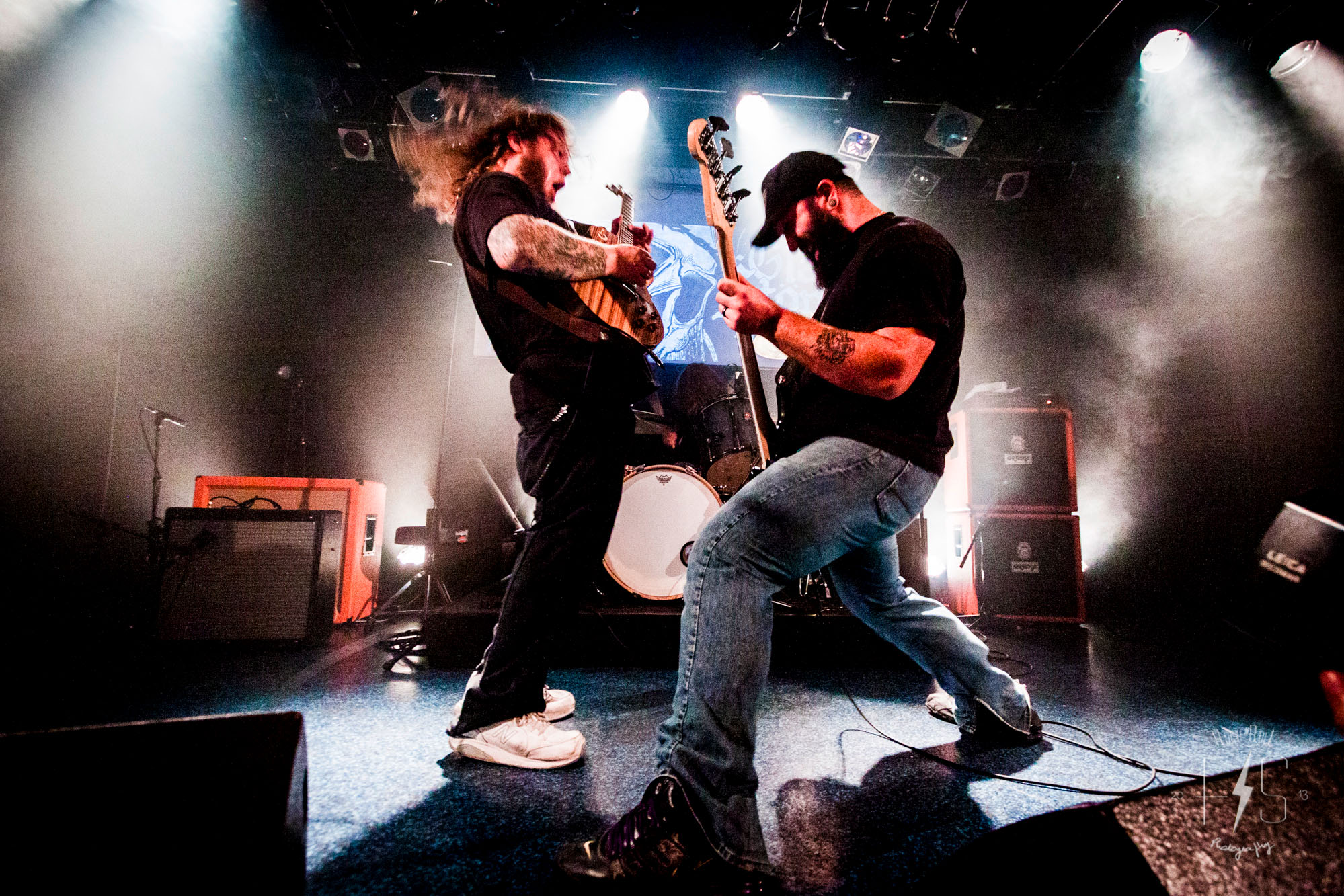
- The Midnight Ghost Train performing in 2013

Background information
- Origin: Buffalo, New York, U.S.
- Genres: Stoner rock, stoner metal, hard rock, blues rock
- Years active: 2008–2018, 2022, 2025-present
- Labels: Napalm, Karate Body
- Members: Steve Moss; Chuy Smit; Jacob Levin
- Past members: Alfred Jordan III; Tyler Harper; David Kimmell; Brandon Burghart; Mike Boyne
- Website: themidnightghosttrain.bandcamp.com

The Midnight Ghost Train is an American rock band from Topeka, Kansas. Its current lineup consists of Steve Moss (guitar/vocals), Chuy Smit (bass), and Jacob Levin (drums). The trio is categorized as stoner rock, hard rock, and heavy blues. TMGT consistently toured the U.S. and Europe from their formation in 2008 to their separation in 2018, with their energetic live show being the staple of the band. They were signed to the Austrian based label Napalm Records. The band reunited in 2025 for a small run of European shows and festivals, with original drummer Jacob Levin and bassist Chuy Smit of Sons of Node (NL).

== History ==
The Midnight Ghost Train was originally formed by Steve Moss in Buffalo, New York. The band's name came partially from a Hank William's song lyric in I'm So Lonesome I Could Cry. TMGT's first release was "Johnny Boy EP" in 2008, and in 2009 they self-released their first full-length album which was self-titled. The album was self-recorded in their home studio after the band relocated to Kansas. They followed up with their 2012 album "Buffalo", released on Karate Body Records. It was recorded entirely analog by Dave Barbe in Athens, Georgia. Displaying the band's delta blues influences, the album features a Lead Belly cover of Cotton Fields done a cappella. In 2013, TMGT performed at the Roadburn Festival in Tilburg, Netherlands, and released "Live at Roadburn 2013" shortly thereafter. After losing their previous bass player, they went through several lineup changes before finding bassist Mike Boyne. In 2014, TMGT signed with the Austrian-based metal label, Napalm Records, which released TMGT's "Cold Was The Ground" on February 28, 2015. The album had a much faster tempo than previous releases, with more emphasis on song construction. The release boosted their popularity allowing them to appear at major festivals such as Hellfest and Graspop Metal Meeting. Napalm released their fourth full-length album "Cypress Ave." on July 28, 2017. Once again progressing into a more mature sound with a wide array of genres, including a hip hop track featuring Sonny Cheeba from Camp Lo. TMGT has been most commonly described as hard rock, and related to bands like Kyuss, Black Sabbath, and Clutch. The band built the majority of their fan base from consistent touring, and exciting live performances. In 2018, TMGT went on an open ended hiatus to focus more on family life. Currently, they are seen playing shows every now and then.

== Members ==
- Steve Moss – vocals, guitar
- Chuy Smit – bass, pure strength
- Jacob Levin – drums, vocals

Former members

- Alfred Jordan III – bass (2012, 2017)
- Tyler Harper – bass (2018)
- David Kimmell – bass (2010–2012)
- Brandon Burghart - drums (2009-2018) bass (2008)
- Mike Boyne - bass (2013-2016)

== Discography ==
- The Johnny Boy EP (2008)
- The Midnight Ghost Train (2009)
- Buffalo (2012)
- Live at Roadburn 2013 (2013)
- Cold Was the Ground (2015)
- Cypress Ave. (2017)
