= Spoil Engine =

Belgian metal band

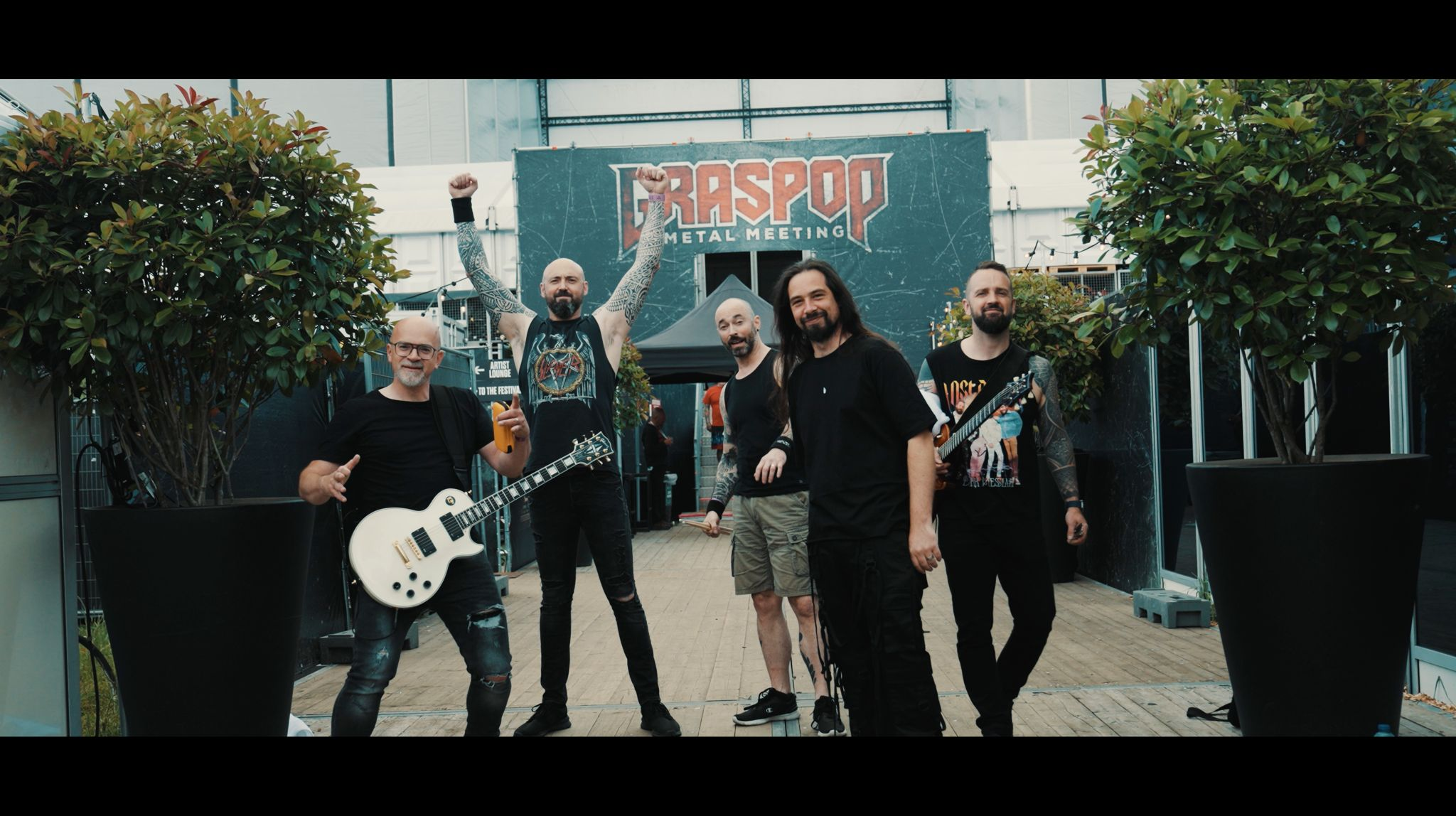
- Graspop Metal Meeting 2024

Background information
- Origin: Roeselare, Belgium
- Genres: Melodic death metal, metalcore
- Years active: 2004–present
- Labels: Nuclear Blast, Roadrunner, Universal, Arising Empire
- Members: Steven 'Gaze' Sanders; Nick Vandenberghe; Niek Tournois; Steven Demey; Dave De Loco
- Past members: Iris Goessens; Bart Vandeportaele; Matthijs Quaars; Kristof Taveirne
- Website: spoilengine.com

Spoil Engine is a heavy metal band from Belgium, formed in 2004. The band plays a mix of melodic thrash metal and groove metal, influenced by bands such as Pantera, In Flames, Lamb of God and Soilwork. They have released one demo and three full albums and were the first Belgian band to sign with Roadrunner Records.

Spoil Engine directly supported bands such as Megadeth, Motörhead, Killswitch Engage, Arch Enemy and Prong. Major festival appearances include Graspop Metal Meeting (5x), Pukkelpop (2x), Masters at Rock (2x) and Suikerrock (2x). 2 singles have appeared in the national charts; videoclips and songs have national airplay.

In 2017 and 2018, the band gained international visibility through tours in Europe and Asia, with tour supports for Prong and Papa Roach. Major appearances included MIDI festival in China and Wacken Open Air. They also performed on the 2020 70000 Tons of Metal festival during that year's cruise to Cozumel.

In June 2024, Spoil Engine was invited to play the Graspop Metal Meeting for the fifth time, this time on the main stage, to celebrate the band's 20th anniversary. Veterans Niek Tournois, Steven Demey, and Nick Vandenberghe joined band members Steven ‘gaze’ Sanders and Davy ‘loco’ Vanlokeren for this unique lineup.

== Members ==
- Steven 'gaze' Sanders - lead guitar (2004-present)
- Nick Vandenberghe - guitar (2004-2010, 2024-present)
- Niek Tournois - vocals (2004-2015, 2024-present)
- Steven Demey - drums (2004-2010, 2024-present)
- Dave De Loco – bass (2017–present)

== Discography ==
=== Albums ===
- Skinnerbox v.07 (2007, Apache Records)
- Antimatter (2009, Roadrunner Records)
- The Art of Imperfection (2012, Universal)
- Stormsleeper (2017, Arising Empire/Nuclear Blast)
- Renaissance Noire (2019, Arising Empire/Nuclear Blast)

=== EPs/Singles ===
- Stormsleeper (2015, Daily Sin Entertainment)
- Unklock and Release (2021)

=== Demos ===
- The Fragile Light Before Ignition (2006, self-released)

== See also ==
- List of Roadrunner Records artists
