= Thronar =

Dutch metal band

- Origin: Arnhem, Gelderland, Netherlands
- Genres: Folk metal, Viking metal, black metal
- Years active: 1998–2009
- Labels: Seven Kingdoms Records; Twilight Records
- Members: Otto van Beusekom; Jarno Olinga; Kevin Olinga; Nathalia Hoogkamer; Bouke Braun
- Past members: Reamon Bloem; Joost Westdijk; Koen de Graaf; Elwin Molenaar; Nick; Marin
- Website: http://www.thronar.net/

Thronar was a Dutch Viking metal/black metal band from Arnhem. They released a discography consisting of three demos, one split album, and two albums.

== History ==
Thronar formed under the name "Cerberus" in 1998 by guitarists Otto van Beusekom and Reamon Bloem, with drummer Joost Westdijk (of Bolthorn). The band got serious when joined by Nathalia Hoogkamer (keyboards) and Marin (vocals). Under the name Cerberus they released two demos, A Journey Must Begin... and One Man's Faith. In 2002, they changed their name to Thronar because there were many bands called Cerberus, and because they started playing a different style, from black metal to Viking metal.

The band have commented on being influenced by the early Norwegian black metal scene; they claim to be atheistic, though they respect certain forms of Satanism. Ideologically, the band hearkens back to old myths and mysticism.

In 2003, Thronar recorded a promo consisting of four tracks, which led to the band getting signed to Seven Kingdoms Records. Shortly afterward, the band made a split with three other bands, Arnhem Trolleymetaal.

In 2005, Thronar's debut album, For Death and Glory, was released through Seven Kingdoms. The album received positive reviews and was reprinted several times. Shortly after in 2006 Reamon decided to fully concentrate on guitar and Koen was brought on for vocal duties. In this lineup the band toured with bands such as Eluveitie, Moonsorrow, Ensiferum, Arch Enemy, Korpiklaani, and In Extremo.

Thronar's second album, Unleash the Fire, was released in 2008 on Twilight Records.

In 2009, Thronar's vocalist, Reamon Bloem, left the band and a replacement was sought. However, following this, Thronar declared that they were split up.

== Discography ==
=== As Cerberus ===
- A Journey Must Begin... (demo, 1999)
- One Man's Fate (demo, 2001)

=== As Thronar ===
- Promo 2003 (demo, 2003)
- Arnhem Trolleymetaal (split album, Seven Kingdoms, 2003)
- For Death and Glory (full-length, Seven Kingdoms, 2005)
- Unleash the Fire (full-length, Twilight, 2008)

== Line-up ==
=== Final members ===
- Otto van Beusekom - guitar, vocals (1998–2009)
- Jarno Olinga - drums (2005–2009)
- Kevin Olinga - guitar (2007–2009)
- Nathalia Hoogkamer - keyboards (1999–2009)
- Bouke Braun - bass (1999–2009)

=== Former members ===
- Reamon Bloem - guitar (1998–2009), vocals (1998–2006, 2008–2009)
- Joost Westdijk - drums (1999–2005)
- Koen de Graaf - vocals (2006–2008)
- Elwin Molenaar - drums (2005)
- Nick - vocals
- Marin - vocals
