= Leng Tch'e =

Belgian grindcore band

- Origin: Ghent, Belgium
- Genres: Grindcore, deathgrind
- Years active: 2001-present
- Labels: The Spew, Willowtip (2001-2004) Relapse (2005-2009) Season of Mist (2010-present)
- Website: www.lengtche.net

Leng Tch'e is a Belgian grindcore band that describes their style as "razorgrind", a combination of grindcore with death metal, stoner rock and metalcore. The band's name is an alternate romanisation of "língchí", a method of torture and execution from Imperial China that is also known as "death by a thousand cuts". Death by a Thousand Cuts is the name of one of the band's albums.

== Biography ==
Leng Tch'e drummer Sven is Aborted frontman Gurgloroth 'Svencho' Sven De Caluwé. The band began as Anal Torture, formed by Sven and Dark Ages guitarist Glen with vocalist Isaac and bass player Kevin in early 2002. Leng Tch'e signed to the Italian Spew label for the 2002 album Death by a Thousand Cuts. After that album, the band released a split 7-inch single with Black Ops.

The band employed Israeli guitarist Nir 'The Goat' Doliner of Lehavoth and played shows in Israel opening for Amon Amarth. Unable to secure a bassist, Nicolas switched from guitar to bass. Geographical distance prevented Doliner from a full-time role. In early 2004, the band recruited Geert as a second guitarist. The band enrolled former Pyaemia bassist Frank Rizzo as guitarist in late 2003. In the meantime, Isaac founded the noise side project Permanent Death whilst vocalist Sven De Caluwé fronted In-Quest for an album.

The band's second album, ManMadePredator, was released in May 2003. Leng Tch'e recorded split releases in 2004 with Fuck...I'm Dead for No Escape Records and a split 7-inch single with Gronibard on Bones Brigade Records. Guitarist Rizzo left in August, replaced in November with Jan of Spleen. In early 2005, the band enlisted Boris of Suppository as new frontman, debuting this line-up at 30 April 'Face Your Underground' festival in Antwerp.

Leng Tch'e signed to Relapse Records in March, scheduling a summer release date for the album The Process of Elimination. The band played May US East Coast dates with Impaled, Malignancy and Aborted. The band partnered with Fuck the Facts and Beneath the Massacre for a Canadian tour in 2006.

On March 9, 2007, the album Marasmus released on Relapse Records. Some commentators noted that the album sound closer to deathcore.

On May 16, 2008, the band announced that Boris had quit the band.

After 4 of the coolest and craziest years of my life, I've decided to quit my activities in Leng Tch'e. A difficult decision, considering the fact that I really loved the shows/touring and hanging out with these guys. However, I came to a point in my life where other things start to matter. I don't have the energy and commitment anymore that I used to have, so the time has come to part ways with Leng Tch'e. For me it feels like ending a long term relationship and I think it will feel really strange knowing they will go on without me. Nevertheless, I know this is a well considered decision and wish them all the best in the future. Leng Tch'e has made me who I am today. Thanks for that! - Boris.

He was replaced with Serge Kasongo, formerly of Ackros, with whom the band toured Canada in 2008 alongside Krisiun. Recording for the followup to Marasmus started in 2009, with a release planned for the spring of 2010 on Season Of Mist. The album was named Hypomanic and mixed and mastered by Russ Russell (Napalm Death, Brujeria, Evile).

The band toured with Origin and Psycroptic in early 2012 in support of Hypomanic.

== Influences ==
The band's Myspace page credits Regurgitate, Hemdale, Nasum and Blood Duster as formative influences for the group. Jan Hallaert has also cited Hateplow, Bury Your Dead, Burnt by the Sun, Yob, The Sword, Converge, Neurosis, Mastodon, Aborted, Ringworm, Morbid Angel, Hatebreed, Torche, Suffocation, Fu Manchu, and Cephalic Carnage.

== Members ==
=== Current members ===
- Nicolas Malfeyt - bass (2002–present)
- Jan Hallaert - guitars (2005–present)
- Serge Kasongo - vocals (2008–present)
- Olivier Coppens - drums (2011–present)

=== Former Members ===
- Kevin Loosveld - bass (2001-2002)
- Glen Herman - guitars (2001-2003)
- Isaac Roelens - vocals (2001-2005)
- Sven de Caluwe - drums, vocals (2001-2007)
- Steven Van Cauwenbergh - bass (2003)
- Nir Doliner - guitars (2003)
- Frank Stijnen - guitars (2003-2004)
- Geert Devenster - guitars (2004-2007)
- Boris Cornelissen - vocals (2005-2008)
- Peter Goemaere - guitars (2007)
- Tony van den Eynde - drums (2007-2011)

Timeline

== Discography ==
- Razorgrind (Split 7-inch EP with Black Ops) (2002)
- Death by a Thousand Cuts (2002)
- ManMadePredator (2003)
- The Process of Elimination (2005)
- Amusical Propaganda for Sociological Warfare (Split 7-inch EP with Warscars) (2006)
- Marasmus (2007)
- Split w/ Fuck the Facts (2008)
- Hypomanic (2010)
- Razorgrind (2017)
