= Collibus =

British progressive metal band

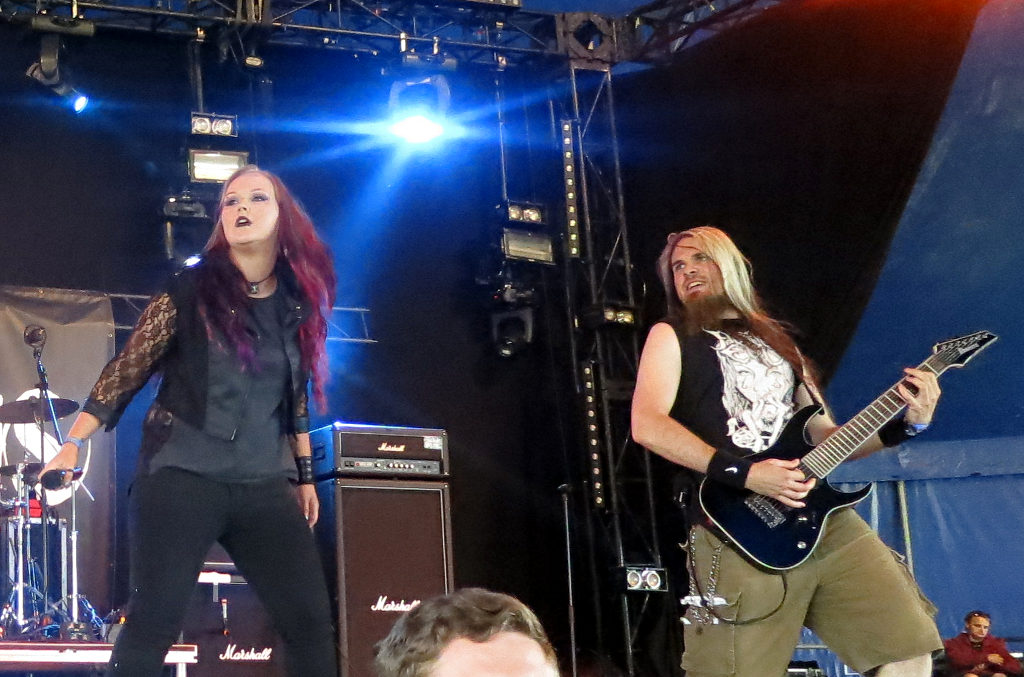
- Collibus performing at Download Festival in 2014

Background information
- Origin: Manchester, England
- Genres: Progressive metal
- Years active: 2004–present
- Members: Gemma Fox; Stephen Platt; Daniel Mucs; RJ Kershaw; Darren Pugh
- Website: www.collibus.com

Collibus is a British five-piece progressive metal band from Manchester. Members include Gemma Fox (lead vocals), Stephen Platt (lead guitar/backing vocals/production), Daniel Mucs (rhythm guitar), RJ Kershaw (bass guitar), and Darren Pugh (drums). In November 2013, Collibus was the first rock band to play a live set in the UK House of Commons.

Collibus won the Mike Weatherley MP discretionary award of the Parliamentary competition Rock the House. Weatherly became the band's manager.

In February 2014, the band released their debut album, The False Awakening. The False Awakening has been met with critical acclaim from music press.

In 2014, the band performed at Download Festival, Bloodstock Open Air, and the UK Sonisphere Festival.
