= Cypher (band) =

Instrumental band from Perth, Western Australia

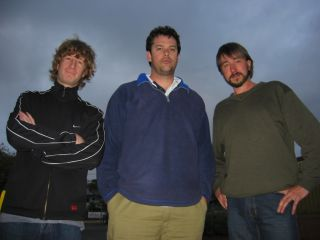

Background information
- Origin: Perth, Western Australia, Australia
- Genres: Post-rock/Instrumental
- Years active: 1998–present
- Labels: Aporia Records; Unit 6 Records
- Members: Sebastian Parsons; Alec Monger; Sam Pugsley
- Past members: Mark Cossom; Rob Agostini; Karli Rob; Ian Roberston
- Website: Official website

Cypher are a three-piece instrumental band from Perth, Western Australia, Australia.

== Music ==
Cypher have been variously classified as Post-rock, Space rock, Noise and Shoegaze. Although their music can contain elements of any of these categories, they don't fall into any specific one.

Their sound is often characterised by multiple delay effects on the guitar, causing a 'wall of sound'. The guitar and bass riffs are often repeated at great length, ebbing and flowing in volume and intensity. The songs can be quite long, sometimes exceeding 15 minutes in length. Live, the band often performs at loud volumes.

== Band history ==
Formed in 1998 as a five-piece, the original line-up included Mark Cossom (guitar) and Rob Agostini (vocals). This line-up played several performances and recorded a single in 1998 before Cossom and Agostini left the band amicably. Their departure caused the style of the music to become focused on longer songs with fewer sections, which gradually built up from quiet beginnings into overpowering crescendos and back down again.

The band (now a three-piece) released their debut album What's a World Without Laughter in September 1999 on the Toronto based Aporia Records label. Some songs on the album utilised keyboards, so to perform the songs live, the band recruited Karli Rob on keyboards.

An album of remixes and some new material was released in 2000. The band performed a small number of performances before Rob left and was replaced on keyboards by Ian Roberston. More performances followed, including a slot on RTRFM's annual fundraiser 'In the Pines', during which the band was noted for their use of a whipper snipper as an instrument and cooking pancakes onstage for the crowd during their set.

From the end of 2003, the band experienced a hiatus until re-emerging as the current three=-piece line-up at the end of 2005. An album of previously recorded material, Life Changing Sunnies, was released in September 2006.

After another period of inactivity, late in 2012 the band played a series of live performances and recorded a new album One Thousand Birds which was released in October 2013.

== Members ==
- Sebastian Parsons – guitar (1998–present)
- Alec Monger – bass (1998–present)
- Sam Pugsley – drums (1998–present)
- Mark Cossom – guitar (1998)
- Rob Agostini – vocals (1998)
- Karli Rob – keyboards (1999–2000)
- Ian Roberston – keyboards (2000–03)

== Discography ==
=== Albums ===
- What's a World Without Laughter – Aporia (1 September 1999)
- Life Changing Sunnies – Unit 6 (23 September 2006)
- One Thousand Birds – Unit 6 (1 October 2013)

=== Singles/EPs ===
- "Hi Monica" / "Aquatic Song" – (1998)
- Remixes – (EP) (2000)
