= Dear Superstar =

- Origin: Manchester, England
- Genre: Hard rock, Heavy Rock, Metalcore,
- Years active: 2004-2012 2023-present
- Label: Demolition/DR2/BMG
- Members: Micky Satiar; Benj Ashmead; Stew Milton; Adam Smethurst; Nicholas Southwood
- Past members: Christopher Bird, Christopher Hodgson, Ben Grimsley, Nic Roe
- Website: http://www.facebook.com/dearsuperstar http://dearsuperstar.co.uk

Dear Superstar are a hard rock band from Manchester, UK.

== Band members ==
The band consists of:

- Micky Satiar - Vocalist.
- Benj Ashmead - Drummer.
- Adam Smethurst - Lead Guitarist.
- Stew Milton - Rhythm Guitarist.
- Nicholas Southwood - Bassist.

== Albums and touring ==
They have released three albums: the first being Confessions of a Twisted Mind (2006), their second Heartless (2008) produced by Romesh Dodangoda and Damned Religion (2012) which was produced by David Jones in Manchester and mixed by Bob Marlette in Los Angeles, a document of years of touring and a graphic confession of the band's lifestyle of unbridled mayhem.

The band sparked a unique relationship with rock independent label DR2 Records who went on to release Heartless, in October 2008. For this album they recruited bassist Chris Hodgson.

Dear Superstar toured in support of Heartless in 2009 supporting Papa Roach on the sold-out tour, were quickly confirmed to appear at the Download Festival 2009 which was swiftly followed by a tour with Buckcherry culminating in an end-of-tour appearance at the Sonisphere festival.

They have also since completed a double-legged tour over winter 2009/2010 with Heavens Basement, a first headline tour during summer 2010, and have supported bands such as Guns N Roses, Motley Crue, Limp Bizkit and Buckcherry.

Their first single was "Live Love Lie" which has been made available on Spotify. "Live Love Lie" featured Bullet for My Valentine's bassist and backing vocalist Jason James, who screamed in the song. Their second single was "Brothers in Blood". Both songs have music videos and have been played on the likes of Scuzz and Kerrang.

They started recording Damned Religion in the summer of 2010, at their own studios (Superstar Studios, Bury) and mixed by legendary rock producer Bob Marlette in Los Angeles. The album was released in February 2012. This album is the follow-up to Heartless.

First single from Damned Religion was Our City Sleeps which featured Buckcherry guitarist Steve Dacanay. The music video was played internationally on all major Rock and Metal TV channels and radio stations, including Kerrang TV, MTV and BBC Radio One.

Original bass player and original drummer left Dear Superstar after the band took a long term hiatus in 2012.

Stephen Kilpatrick and Nic Roe joined the band in 2018.

As of Early 2023 drummer and original founding member, Benj Ashmead, rejoined the band after reconnecting with singer Micky, and playing him some demo's he had been working on.

In September 2023, Dear Superstar announced a 'Reunion Show' in their hometown of Manchester, UK. Opening for American rockers Buckcherry. They also announced the band would be joined by Nicholas Southwood on Bass.

Dear Superstar are currently in the studio with David Radahd-Jones (former Heavens's Basement) and working with Randy Slaugh (additional producer Architects, Sleeping with Sirens, Skillet) on route to creating their 4th Studio Album.
