= The Vintage Caravan =

Icelandic rock band

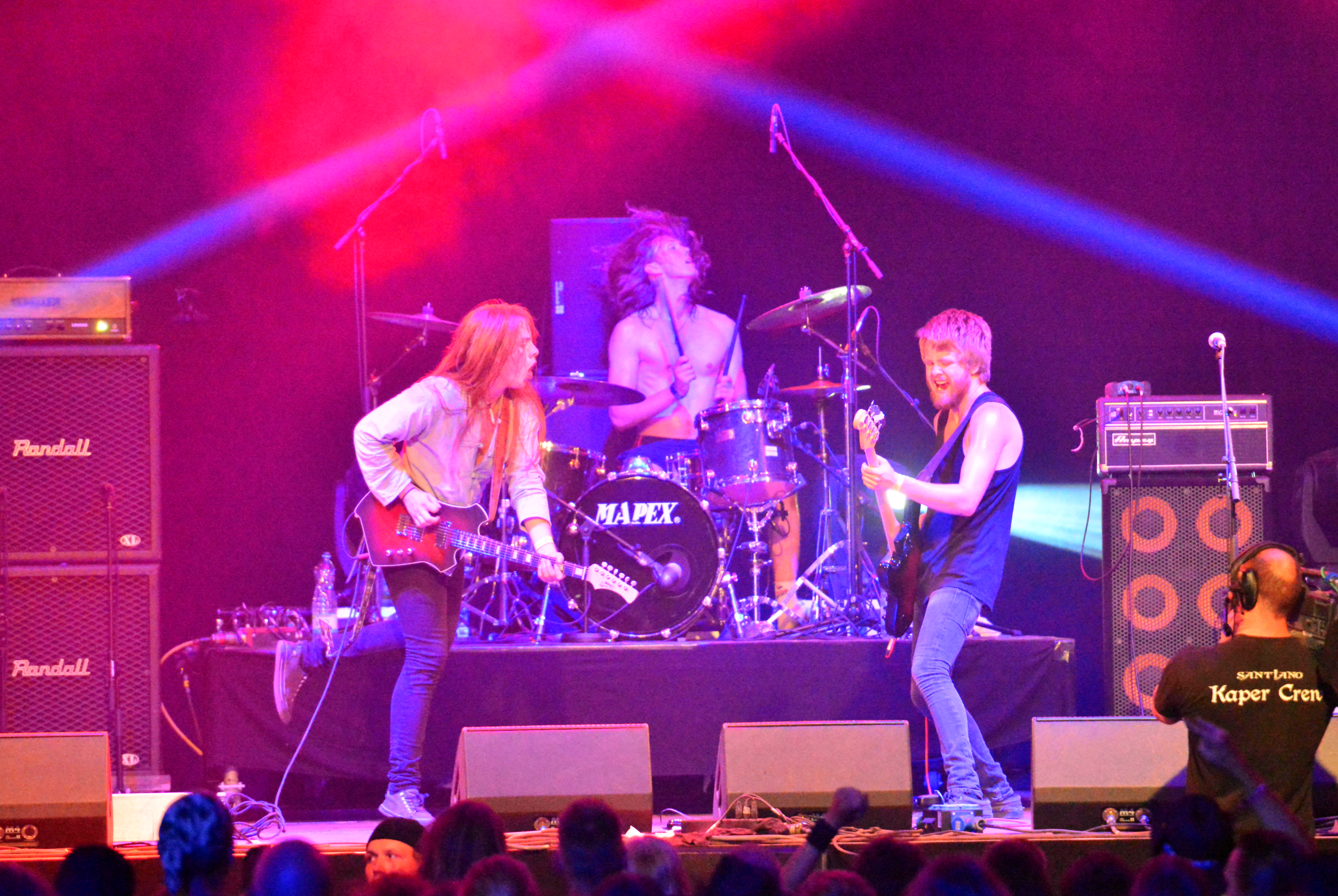
- The Vintage Caravan at Wacken Open Air in 2014.

Background information
- Origin: Álftanes, Iceland
- Genres: Hard rock, blues-rock, stoner rock, psychedelic rock, progressive rock
- Years active: 2006–present
- Labels: Sena, Napalm, Nuclear Blast
- Members: Óskar Logi Ágústsson; Alexander Örn Númason; Stefán Ari Stefánsson
- Past members: Guðjón Reynisson
- Website: https://www.thevintagecaravan.eu/

The Vintage Caravan are a rock band from Álftanes, Iceland. The band was formed in 2006 by Óskar Logi Ágústsson and Guðjón Reynisson before bassist Alexander Örn Númason joined after the first studio album. As of 2025, the band have released six studio albums along with one live album and are currently signed with Napalm Records.

== History ==
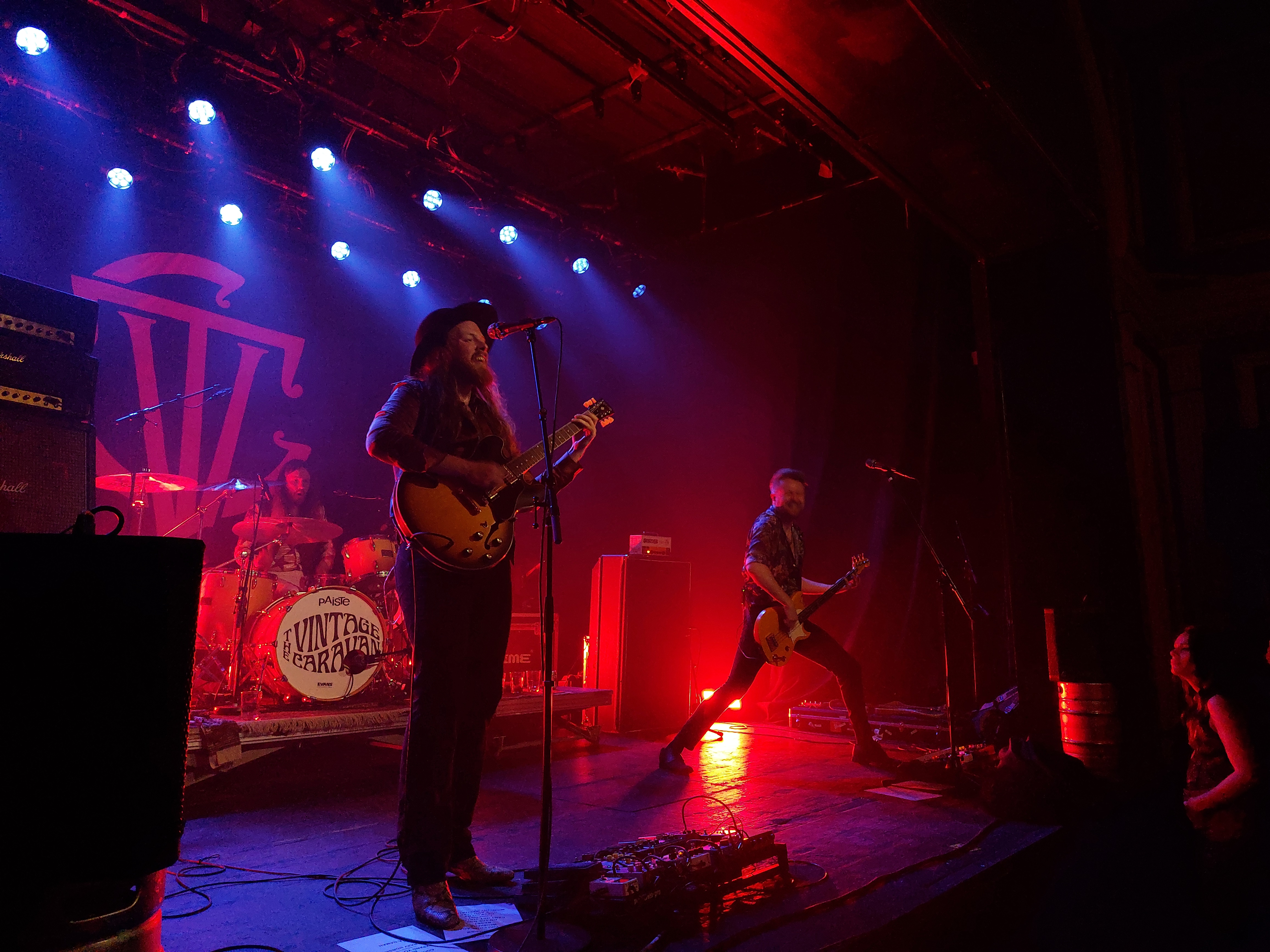
The Vintage Caravan in Reykjavík (2026).

In 2006, 12 year-old school friends Óskar Logi Ágústsson (guitar and vocals) and Guðjón Reynisson (drums) formed the band. They began to work on an album in 2009 and within two years the band self-published their eponymous first album.

In early 2012, the band signed a deal with Icelandic record label Sena ahead of work for their second album. Alexander Örn Númason joined shortly after on bass. A second album Voyage was released in 2014 initially by Sena. The band signed to Nuclear Blast shortly after the release of Voyage. This led to a Expand Your Mind music video produced and released by the German record label. The short film shows the psychedelic 'trips' the three members experience. As of July 2015, the video reached 400,000 hits on YouTube becoming the most viewed online song by the band. Nuclear Blast re-released Voyage to a much wider audience.

In 2014, they were involved in the Rock Revelation Tour with Audrey Horne and Zodiac.

In April 2015, the band announced on Facebook that drummer Guðjón Reynisson had left the band for personal reasons however still remained good friends with the remaining band members. In the same post, Stefán Ari was introduced to fans as the new drummer of the band. On 15 May 2015, Arrival was released with Nuclear Blast as the band's third studio album. This was the first record since the recent line-up change.

The band's fourth studio album Gateways was released in 2018. Two years later the band signed with Napalm Records ahead of the release of the fifth album Monuments. Much like previous albums, Monuments received mostly positive reviews, with Loudersound in particular finishing their 4 out of 5 star review with the sentence 'The Vintage Caravan just get better and better.'

=== Personal life ===
In many interviews, the band have confirmed they are good friends with fellow Nuclear Blast counterparts Blues Pills.

In 2014 following a tour of Europe, the band moved from Reykjavík, Iceland to Sønderborg, Denmark so that they would be nearer to their record label at the time Nuclear Blast.

== Style ==
According to Fred Thomas of AllMusic, the band complied within the genres of classic rock, proto (early) metal and progressive rock. Nuclear Blast however describe them as more psychedelic rock. The band themselves describes their style and sound as 'classic hard rock of the 60's and 70's with a powerful attitude and a modern twist'. The band's influences include Led Zeppelin, Deep Purple, Mastodon, Rush and Cream. The band explain that they love "hard hitting riff fueled music".

== Band members ==
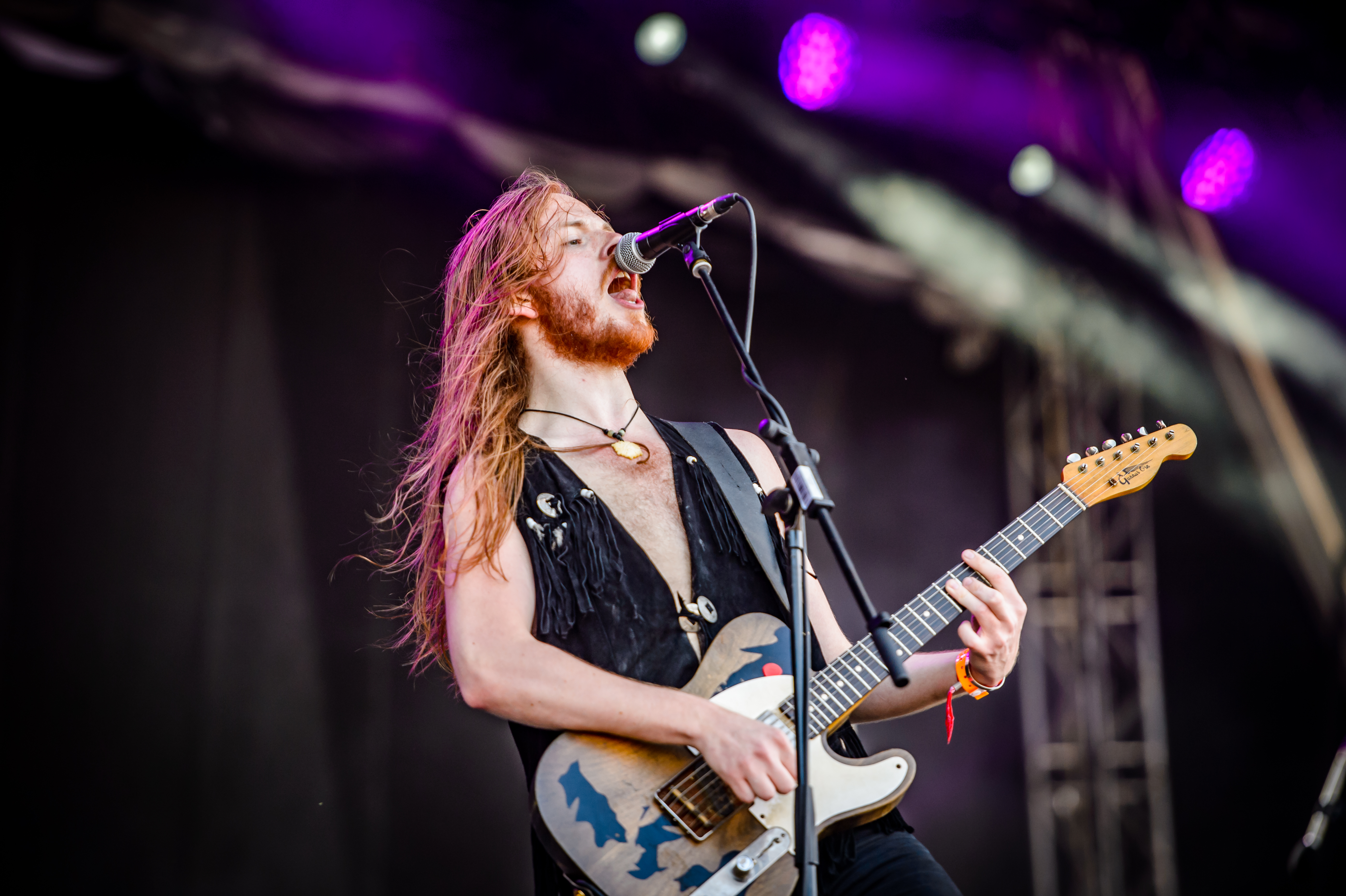
Óskar Logi Ágústsson

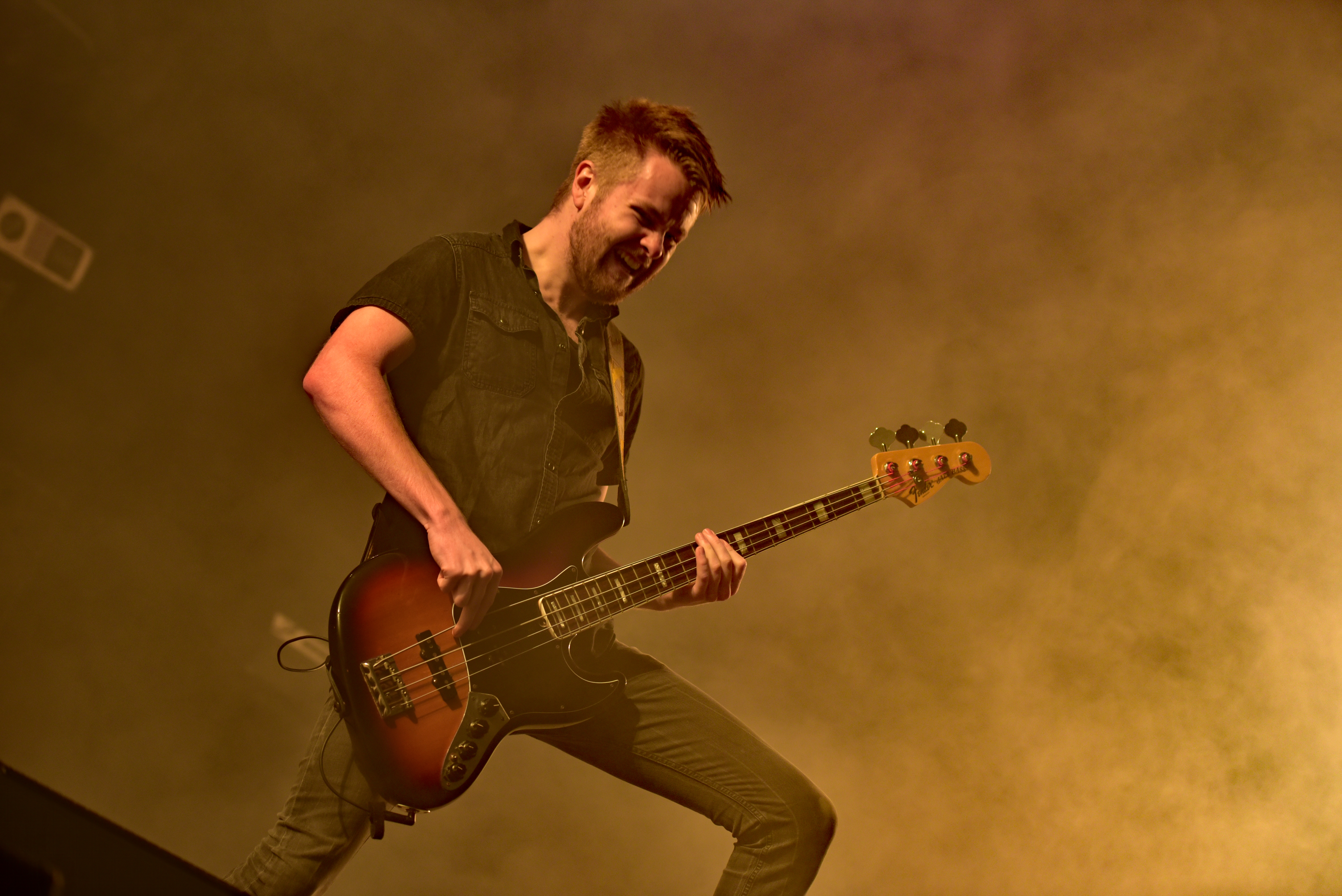
Alexander Örn Númason

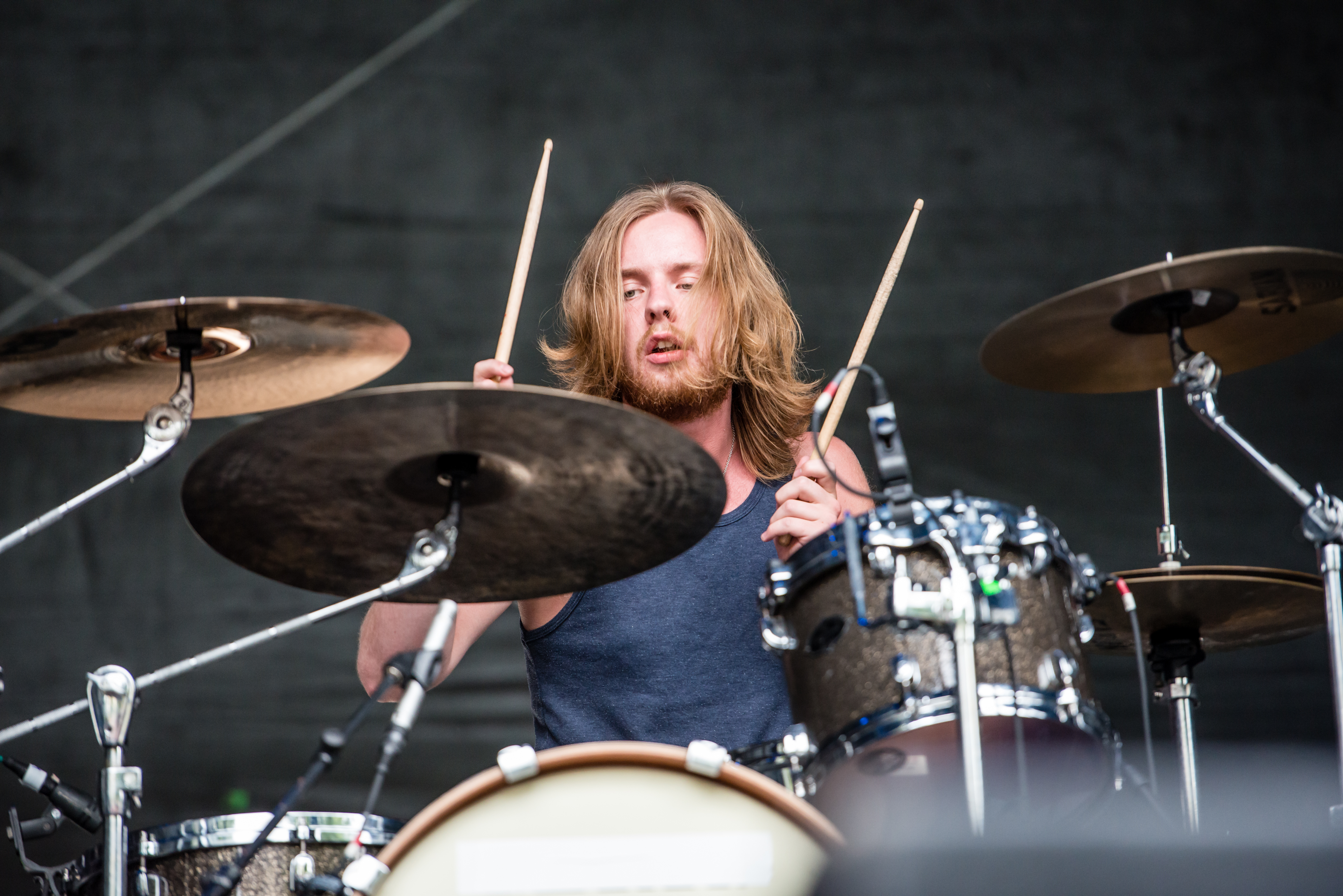
Stefán Ari Stefánsson

Current members

- Óskar Logi Ágústsson – guitars, lead vocals (2006–present)
- Alexander Örn Númason – bass, backing vocals (2012–present)
- Stefán Ari Stefánsson – drums (2015–present)

Former members

- Guðjón Reynisson – drums (2006–2015)
- Halldór Gunnar Pálsson – bass (2006–2010)
- Páll Sólmundur H. Eydal – bass, backing vocals (2010–2012)

== Discography ==
=== Studio Albums ===
- The Vintage Caravan (2011) (self-released)
- Voyage (2014) (Sena)
- Arrival (2015) (Nuclear Blast)
- Gateways (2018) (Nuclear Blast)
- Monuments (2021) (Napalm Records)
- Portals (2025) (Napalm Records)

=== Live Albums ===
- The Monuments Tour (2024) (Napalm Records)
