= Enslaved discography =

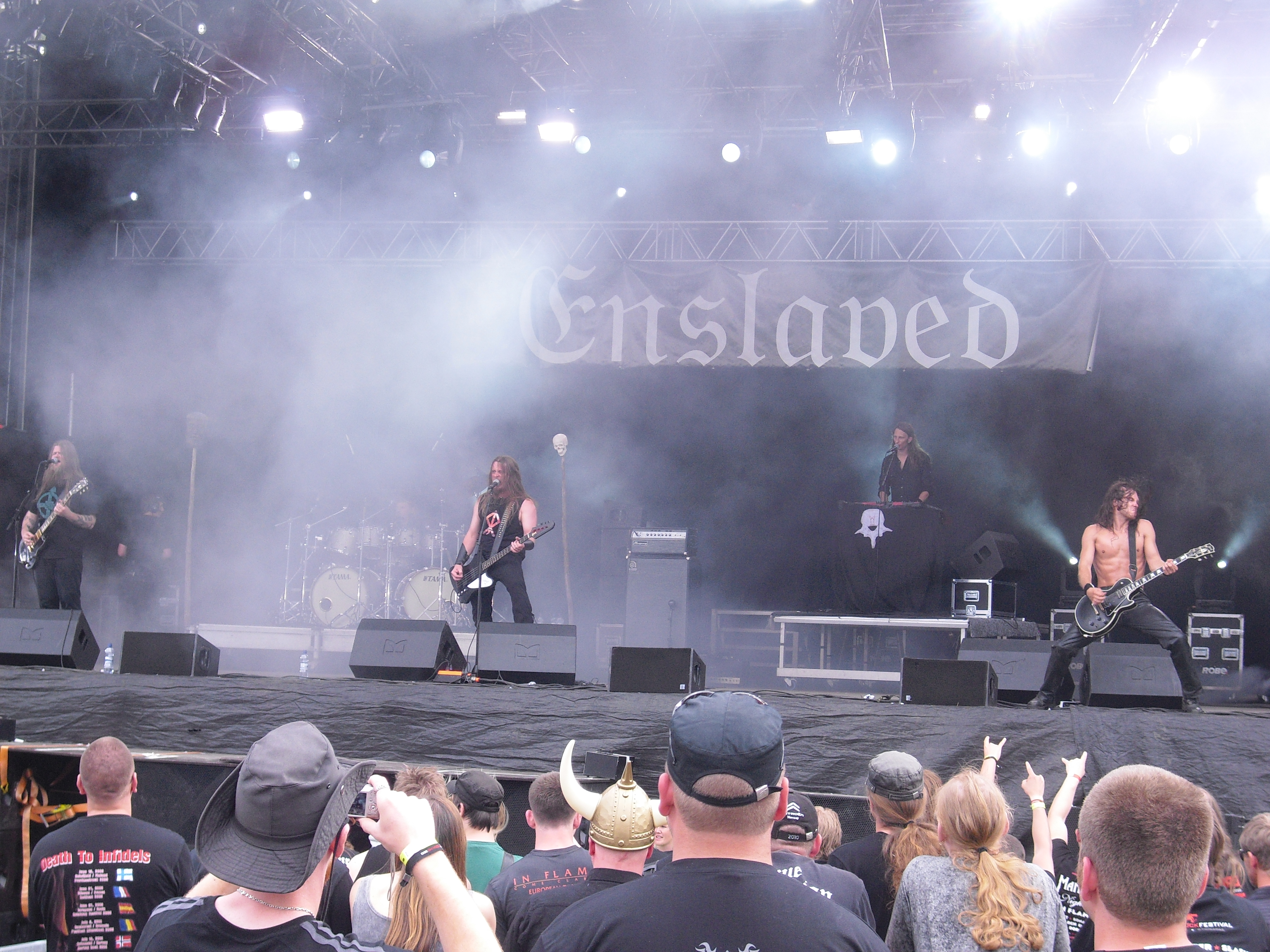
- Enslaved at Norway Rock Festival 2010
- Studio albums: 17
- EPs: 3
- Live albums: 1
- Compilation albums: 3
- Video albums: 2
- Music videos: 23
- Demos: 2
- Split albums: 2

The following is the discography of Enslaved, a Norwegian extreme metal band formed in Haugesund in June 1991. The band has released seventeen studio albums, one live album, three compilation albums, two video albums, twenty-three music videos and three EPs.

== Studio albums ==
Title	Album details	Peak chart positions						
Title	Album details	NOR	AUT	FIN	GER	SWI	UK	US Heat.
Vikingligr Veldi	Released: 28 February 1994; Label: Deathlike Silence; Formats: CD, LP, CS	—	—	—	—	—	—	—
Frost	Released: 26 November 1994; Label: Osmose; Formats: CD, LP, CS, digital download	—	—	—	—	—	—	—
Eld	Released: 7 April 1997; Label: Osmose; Formats: CD, LP, CS, digital download	—	—	—	—	—	—	—
Blodhemn	Released: 1 June 1998; Label: Osmose; Formats: CD, LP, CS, digital download	—	—	—	—	—	—	—
Mardraum – Beyond the Within	Released: 3 October 2000; Label: Osmose; Formats: CD, LP, digital download	—	—	—	—	—	—	—
Monumension	Released: 27 November 2001; Label: Osmose; Formats: CD, LP, digital download	—	—	—	—	—	—	—
Below the Lights	Released: 14 April 2003; Label: Osmose; Formats: CD, LP, digital download	—	—	—	—	—	—	—
Isa	Released: 1 November 2004; Label: Candlelight; Formats: CD, LP, digital download	—	—	—	—	—	—	—
Ruun	Released: 2 May 2006; Label: Candlelight; Formats: CD, HDCD, LP, digital download	23	—	—	—	—	—	—
Vertebrae	Released: 29 September 2008; Label: Nuclear Blast; Formats: CD, LP, digital download	20	—	—	—	—	—	49
Axioma Ethica Odini	Released: 27 September 2010; Label: Nuclear Blast; Formats: CD, LP, digital download	11	—	—	—	—	—	16
RIITIIR	Released: 9 October 2012; Label: Nuclear Blast; Formats: CD, CD+DVD, LP, digital download	15	70	47	72	92	180	8
In Times	Released: 10 March 2015; Label: Nuclear Blast; Formats: CD, CD+DVD, LP, digital download	21	—	39	66	—	—	4
E	Released: 13 October 2017; Label: Nuclear Blast; Formats: CD, LP, digital download	12	—	—	80	55	—	—
Utgard	Released: 2 October 2020; Label: Nuclear Blast; Formats: CD, LP, digital download	—	59	—	30	—	—	—
Heimdal	Released: 3 March 2023; Label: Nuclear Blast; Formats: CD, LP, digital download	—	51	—	26	27	—	—
Mið	Released: 30 October 2026; Nuclear Blast; Formats: CD, LP, digital download	37	31	—	61	48	—	—
"—" denotes a recording that did not chart or was not released in that territory.

== Live albums ==
Title	Album details
Roadburn Live	Released: 19 May 2017; Label: Roadburn Music, By Norse Music; Formats: CD, LP, digital download

== Compilation albums ==
Title	Album details
The Wooden Box	Released: 2009; Label: Viva Hate Records; Formats: LP
The Sleeping Gods – Thorn	Released: November 2016; Label: By Norse Music; Formats: CD, LP, digital download
Army of the North Star	Released: February 2020; Label: Darkness Shall Rise Productions; Formats: CS

== EPs ==
Title	Album details
Hordanes Land	Released: May 1993; Label: Candlelight; Formats: LP
The Sleeping Gods	Released: 10 May 2011 (a CD containing both The Sleeping Gods and Thorn was later released on 11 November 2016); Label: Scion Audio/Visual; Formats: digital download, CD (By Norse Music)
Thorn	Released: 27 August 2011 (a CD containing both The Sleeping Gods and Thorn was later released on 11 November 2016); Label: Soulseller Records; Formats: LP, CD (By Norse Music)
Caravans to the Outer Worlds	Released: 1 October 2021; Label: Nuclear Blast Records; Formats: digital download, CD

== Demos ==
Title	Demo details
Nema	Released: 1991; Label: Self-released; Formats: CS
Yggdrasill	Released: 1992; Label: Self-released; Formats: CS

== Split albums ==
Title	Album details	Notes
Hordanes Land	Released: June 1993; Label: Candlelight; Formats: CD, CS	split with Emperor
Yggdrasill	Released: 1995; Label: Moonfog; Formats: CD, LP, CS, digital download	split with Satyricon

== Videos ==
=== Video albums ===
Title	Video details
Live Retaliation	Released: 1 August 2003; Label: Metal Mind; Formats: DVD
Return to Yggdrasill	Released: 12 September 2005; Label: Tabu; Formats: DVD

=== Other songs ===
- "Jizzlobber" (Faith No More cover) - Metal Hammer Goes 90s covermount CD / Decibel Flexi Series No. 87.
- "Dauden" (Windir cover) - Valfar, ein Windir

=== Music videos ===
Year	Title	Directed	Album
2004	"Isa"	Asle Birkeland	Isa
2005	"Bounded by Allegiance"	—	Return To Yggdrasill
2006	"Path to Vanir"	Asle Birkeland	Ruun
2007	"Essence"	Kamikaze Media	Ruun
2008	"The Watcher"	Patric Ullaeus	Vertebrae
2010	"Ethica Odini"	Luka Bajt	Axioma Ethica Odini
2012	"Veilburner" (Lyric Video)	—	RIITIIR
2012	"Thoughts Like Hammers" (Lyric VIdeo)	Jerome Siegelaer	RIITIIR
2015	"RIITIIR"	Christian Skodjereite	RIITIIR
2015	"Thurisaz Dreaming" (Lyric Video)	—	In Times
2015	"One Thousand Years of Rain" (Lyric Video)	—	In Times
2017	"Storm Son"	---	E
2017	"The River's Mouth"	Josh Graham	E
2019	"What Else Is There?"	---	E
2020	"Homebound"	Gaui H Pic	Utgard
2020	"Jettegryta"	Gaui H Pic	Utgard
2020	"Urjotun"	David Hall	Utgard
2021	"Caravans to the Outer Worlds"	Gaui H Pic	Caravans to the Outer Worlds
2021	"Ruun II - The Epitaph"	Gaui H Pic	Caravans to the Outer Worlds
2022	"Kingdom"	Gaui H Pic	Heimdal
2022	"Congelia"	Marius Marthinussen Søreid	Heimdal
2023	"Forest Dweller"	Gaui H Pic	Heimdal
2023	"The Eternal Sea" (Lyric VIdeo)	Ingo Spörl	Heimdal
