= List of Viking metal bands =

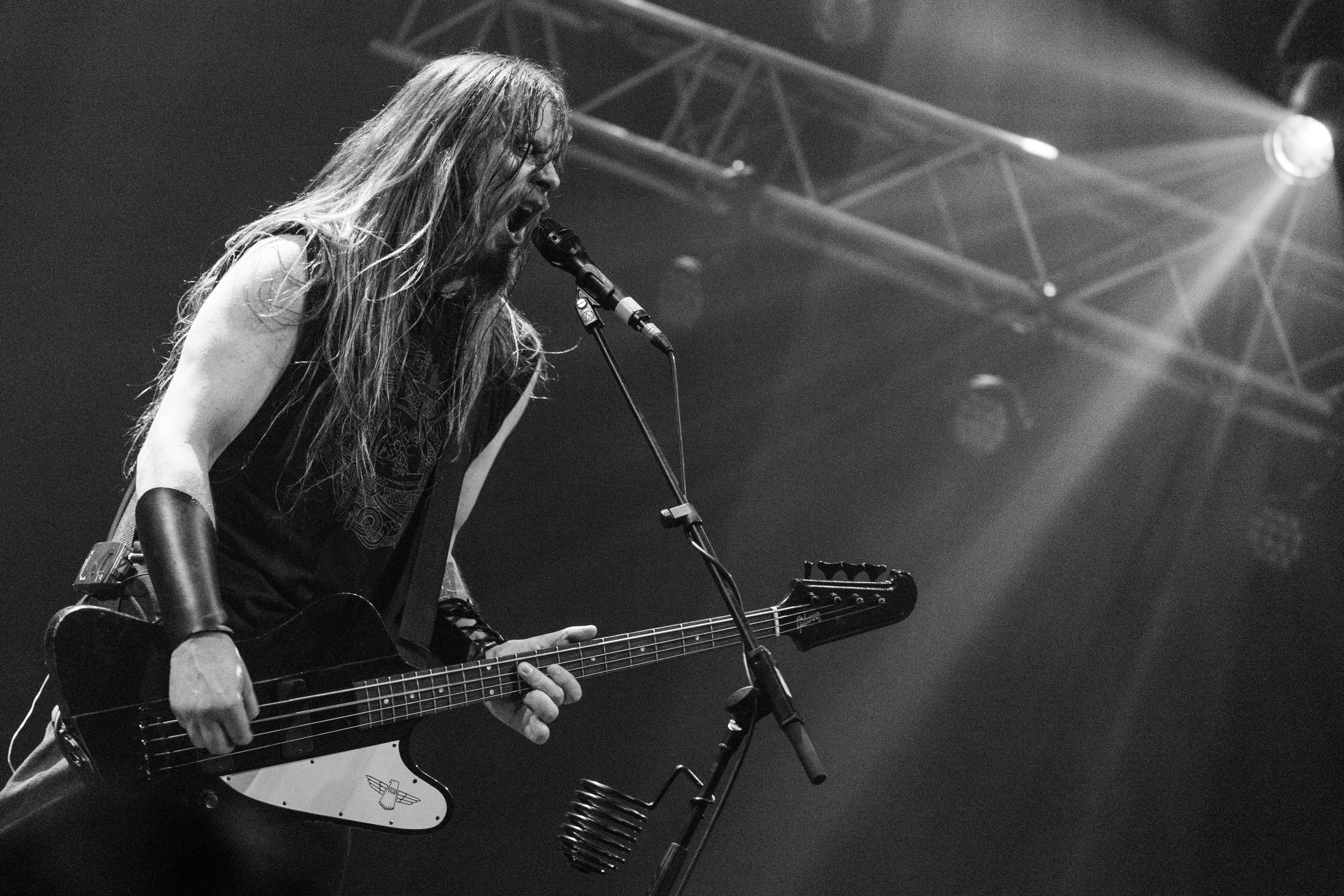
Enslaved performing live at Roadburn Festival, April 2015

This is a list of Viking metal bands. Viking metal is a style of heavy metal music with origins in black metal and Nordic folk music, characterized by a lyrical and thematic focus on Norse mythology, Norse paganism, and the Viking Age. Viking metal is quite diverse as a musical style, to the point where some consider it more a cross-genre term than genre, but it is typically manifested as black metal with influences from Nordic folk music. Common traits include a slow-paced and heavy riffing style, anthemic choruses, use of both clean and harsh vocals, a reliance on folk instrumentation, and often the use of keyboards for atmospheric effect.

Viking metal emerged during the late-1980s through the mid-1990s as a rejection of Satanism and the occult, instead embracing the Vikings and paganism as the leaders of opposition to Christianity. It is similar, in lyrics, sound, and thematic imagery, to pagan metal, but pagan metal has a broader mythological focus and uses folk instrumentation more extensively. Most Viking metal bands originate from the Nordic countries, and nearly all bands claim that their members descend, directly or indirectly, from Vikings.

Though artists such as Led Zeppelin, Yngwie Malmsteen, Heavy Load, and Manowar have previously dealt with Viking themes, Bathory from Sweden is generally credited with pioneering the style with its albums Blood Fire Death (1988) and Hammerheart (1990), which launched a renewed interest in the Viking Age among heavy metal musicians. Enslaved, from Norway, followed up on this burgeoning Viking trend with Hordanes Land (1993) and Vikingligr Veldi (1994). Burzum, Emperor, Einherjer, and Helheim, among others, helped further develop the genre in the early through mid-1990s. Through the work of artists such as the German project Falkenbach, Viking metal soon spread from the Nordic countries to other nations with Viking history or an even broader Germanic heritage, and has since influenced musicians across the globe. The death metal bands Unleashed and Amon Amarth, which emerged in the early 1990s, also adopted Viking themes, broadening the style from its primarily black metal origin.

== List of bands ==
Band	Formed	Origin	Notes	
Adorned Brood	1993	Germany		Ingeborg Anna Baumgärtel of Adorned Brood, 2007
Amon Amarth	1992	Sweden		Ted Lundström of Amon Amarth
Ancient Rites	1988	Belgium		
Ásmegin	1998	Norway		
Barbariön	2007	Australia		Barbariön, 2010
Bathory	1983	Sweden		
Black Messiah	1992	Germany		Black Messiah, 2016
Borknagar	1995	Norway		
Brothers of Metal	2012	Sweden		Brothers of Metal, 2022
Burzum	1988	Norway		Varg Vikernes of Burzum
Claim the Throne	2004	Australia		Claim the Throne
Darkwoods My Betrothed	1992	Finland		
Destroy Destroy Destroy	2003	United States		
Doomsword	1997	Italy		
Drottnar	1996	Norway		Sven-Erik Lind of Drottnar
Einherjer	1993	Norway		Einherjer
Elexorien	2004	Netherlands		
Eluveitie	2002	Switzerland		Eluveitie, 2012
Emperor	1991	Norway		
Ensiferum	1995	Finland		Ensiferum, 2016
Enslaved	1991	Norway		Ivar Bjørnson of Enslaved
Equilibrium	2001	Germany		Jen Majura of Equilibrium
Falkenbach	1989	Germany		
Fejd	2001	Sweden		Fejd, 2013
Finsterforst	2004	Germany		Finsterforst
Folkearth	2003	International		
Folkodia	2007	International		
Forefather	1997	England		
Glittertind	2001	Norway		Torbjørn Sandvik of Glittertind
Grand Magus	1996	Sweden		Janne Christoffersson of Grand Magus
Heidevolk	2002	Netherlands		Heidevolk
Heilung	2014	Germany, Denmark, Norway		Heilung
Hel	1999	Sweden		
Helheim	1992	Norway		Helheim
Holy Blood	1999	Ukraine		
In Battle	1995	Sweden		
Isengard	1989	Norway		Fenriz of Isengard, seen here in 2007
Ithilien	2005	Belgium		Ithilien in 2016
Kampfar	1994	Norway		Kampfar
King of Asgard	2008	Sweden		
Kivimetsän Druidi	2002	Finland		
Korpiklaani	2003	Finland		Tuomas Rounakari of Korpiklaani
Leaves' Eyes	2003	Germany; Norway		Liv Kristine of Leaves' Eyes
Lex Talion	2010	Argentina		
Månegarm	1995	Sweden		Månegarm
Metsatöll	1999	Estonia		Lauri Õunapuu of Metsatöll
Mithotyn	1993	Sweden		
Morgarten	2005	Switzerland		Morgarten in 2019
Myrkgrav	2003	Norway		Lars Jensen of Myrkgrav
Moonsorrow	1995	Finland		Ville Sorvali of Moonsorrow
Obscurity	1997	Germany		Agalaz of Obscurity
Primordial	1987	Ireland		Alan "Nemtheanga" Averill of Primordial
Satyricon	1991	Norway		Sigurd Wongraven "Satyr" of Satyricon, 2008
Skálmöld	2009	Iceland		Björgvin Sigurðsson of Skálmöld
Skeletonwitch	2003	United States		Scott Hendrick of Skeletonwitch
Slechtvalk	1999	Netherlands		Slechtvalk
Solefald	1995	Norway		
Storm	1994	Norway		Kari Rueslåtten of Storm, seen here with The Sirens, 2015
Sólstafir	1995	Iceland		Sólstafir performing live at Eistnaflug 2016
Svartsot	2005	Denmark		Svartsot
The Sword	2003	United States		J. D. Cronise of The Sword
Thronar	1998	Netherlands		
Thyrfing	1995	Sweden		Thyrfing
Trollech	1999	Czech Republic		
Turisas	1997	Finland		Warlord Nygård of Turisas
Twin Obscenity	1990	Norway		
Týr	1998	Faroe Islands		Heri Joensen of Týr
Ulver	1993	Norway		Kristoffer Rygg of Ulver, 2007
Unleashed	1989	Sweden		Johnny Hedlund of Unleashed
Vardøger	1994	Norway		
Varg	2005	Germany		Varg in 2011
Vintersorg	1994	Sweden		
Windir	1994	Norway		
Wintersun	2003	Finland		Wintersun
Wolfchant	2003	Germany		Gvern of Wolfchant

== See also ==
- Viking metal
- List of folk metal bands
- List of heavy metal bands
- Heavy metal subgenres
