= Return to Yggdrasill =

Video by Enslaved
- Released: 12 September 2005
- Recorded: 4 May 2005 at Teatergarasjen
- Genre: Progressive metal, viking metal
- Length: 1:32:11
- Label: Tabu Recordings, Candlelight Records, US
- Producer: Tonje Elisabeth Hansen, Stig Ese Eliassen, Tord Hansen

Enslaved chronology
Isa (2004)	Return to Yggdrasill (2005)	Ruun (2006)

Return to Yggdrasill is the second live DVD by Norwegian extreme metal band Enslaved, consisting primarily of concert footage recorded in Bergen, Norway. The material on this set focuses primarily on songs from the preceding album, Isa.

== Track listing ==
1. "Intro" – 0:29
2. "Bounded by Allegiance" – 6:13
3. "Ascension" – 6:32
4. "The Voices" – 5:59
5. "Lunar Force" – 6:53
6. "Isa" – 3:35
7. "Jotunblod" – 4:16
8. "Return to Yggdrasill" – 6:15
9. "The Crossing" – 9:59

== Reception ==
The DVD was reviewed by powermetal.de, which described it as truly impressive while noting that the concert was too short. A reviewer at heavymetal.dk wrote that the music was delivered with precision and joy, however, he criticized the bonus section, saying that the Norwegian was spoken too fast to be completely understandable, and gave the DVD a 7 out of 10. A reviewer from Vampster praised Enslaved for their good humor, stating that the DVD was a far from ordinary presentation of the band.
