= Caravans to the Outer Worlds =

EP by Enslaved
- Released: 1 October 2021
- Genre: Progressive metal, black metal
- Length: 18:12
- Label: Nuclear Blast
- Producer: Iver Sandøy, Ivar Bjørnson, Grutle Kjellson

Enslaved chronology
Utgard (2020)	Caravans to the Outer Worlds (2021)	Heimdal (2023)

Caravans to the Outer Worlds is the fourth EP by Norwegian extreme metal band Enslaved, released 1 October 2021 by Nuclear Blast.

== Background ==
The EP was constructed as a musical and lyrical bridge between Enslaved's previous studio album, Utgard (2020), and their next studio album in the future. According to lead songwriter Ivar Bjørnson, "After Utgard, the path ahead cleared itself - and we followed; past, present and future melted together in an EP that marks one giant leap for us. Into…" The EP was arranged in the form of a classical suite, with two long compositions and two intermezzos.

The EP's songs were used as the centerpiece for a special concert called The Otherworldly Big Band Experience, in collaboration with progressive rock band Shaman Elephant. The song "Ruun II - The Epitaph" references the band's 2006 album Ruun. The title track "Caravans to the Outer Worlds" reappeared on the band's 2023 studio album Heimdal.

== Critical reception ==
Upon its release, the EP received generally favorable reviews, but with some critiques of its nature as a brief bridge between other albums. Metal Injection concluded that the EP is less adventurous than Enslaved's recent studio albums, and is therefore "a little disappointing", but it is still "yet another successful release in their iconic career." Metal Rules noted that "the EP manages to sound futuristic and ancient simultaneously" and that it "delivers more than many LPs three times its length can." Tounela magazine concluded that the EP "pushes the limits of their highly innovative metal sound even further, making this treat possibly one of their most dynamic and expansive works to date." In the words of Heaviest of Art, "Enslaved have nothing else to prove and yet here they are, continuing to develop towards a grandeur that is ever so present in their output."

== Track listing ==
No.	Title	Length
1.	"Caravans to the Outer Worlds"	6:36
2.	"Intermezzo I: Lonnlig. Gudlig."	3:15
3.	"Ruun II - The Epitaph"	5:37
4.	"Intermezzo II: The Navigator"	2:44

== Personnel ==
- Ivar Bjørnson – electric guitars, acoustic guitars, synthesizers, keyboards, sequencer, FX, backing vocals (track 1)
- Grutle Kjellson – vocals, bass, synthesizer
- Iver Sandøy – vocals, drums, percussion, keyboards, FX
- Håkon Vinje – keyboards, piano, vocals
- Arve Isdal – electric guitars
