= Mið =

Studio album by Enslaved
- Released: 30 October 2026
- Genres: Black metal; progressive metal
- Length: 41:53
- Label: Nuclear Blast
- Producers: Iver Sandøy; Ivar Bjørnson; Grutle Kjellson

Enslaved chronology
Heimdal (2023)	Mið (2026)

Mið is the seventeenth studio album by Norwegian extreme metal band Enslaved, released 30 October 2026 by Nuclear Blast. The album's release was preceded by the singles "Spirit Helper" and "Solar Will".

== Background ==
The album's title is an Old Norse word for "centre" or "middle" which further signifies a departure or a new beginning. The title and lyrics were inspired by Bronze Age artifacts and petroglyphs found in the band's home country of Norway. Bassist Grutle Kjellson explained that the album's lyrics explore conflicts among nature, the cosmos, mythology, and the human mind. The album also continues the explorations of Norse mythology from the band's two previous albums, Utgard (2020) and Heimdal (2023). The song "Parting" includes a stanza from the tenth century Norse poem Völuspá.

The album's recording process differed from that of many previous Enslaved albums. Guitarist Ivar Bjornson explained that the band had considered songwriting ideas that would indicate a progression from the band's previous album Heimdal, but the results were unsatisfactory. Instead, the band recorded Mið with very little prepared material and mostly developed the album organically in the studio.

Sámi musician Johan Sara Jr. contributed throat singing to the song "I Am Ice". The song arose from the band's desire to explore the joik music practiced by Sara and the connections between Sámi musical styles and Enslaved's brand of progressive metal.

Kevin Kicking Woman of the Blackfeet Nation contributed vocals to the song "Spirit Helper". The members of Enslaved met Kicking Woman in 2025 at the Fire in the Mountains music festival, held in Colorado. The band later traveled to Blackfeet lands in Montana, where the band and tribal elders discussed the similarities between Norse and Native American music, leading to a collaboration in the studio. "Spirit Helper" is based on a traditional Blackfeet morning prayer suggested by Kicking Woman. Bjornson noted the similarities between Native American musical traditions and the ancient Norse culture that Enslaved has often explored in its music.

== Critical reception ==
Upon its release, Mið received generally positive reviews in the heavy metal press. Sonic Perspectives described the album as "another golden trophy on their mantle, harnessing all their greatest attributes to deliver their most invigorating, resourceful, and evenly balanced blend of brutality, beauty, and overwhelming catchiness since 2017's E." Invisible Oranges described the album as "slightly floaty" but noted that it succeeds when it finds the common ground between the musical cultures that it explores.

Several reviewers praised the band's continuing musical evolution on Mið. Metal Storm called the album "ambitious, earnest, original and grounded, while simultaneously faithful and loyal to the [band's] past." Distorted Sound noted that "Amazingly, their seventeenth full length album in an expansive career that [sic] has seen them growing from their black metal origins and expanding into possibly the most progressive act in the history of extreme music."

A.N. Grier of Angry Metal Guy gave the album a mixed review, noting that the unconventional writing and recording process resulted in some "jarring" transitions between quieter and heavier passages, and that the album is "strange," but concluded that it can be compared favorably to many of the band's previous albums, "flaws and all". Spectrum Culture found that some of the songs can be incoherent by trying to combine many different musical styles, but concluded that the album is "a refreshing step in another, more chaotic direction, one that displays the band’s formidable range and demonstrates that their vitality is undimmed."

== Track listing ==
All lyrics are written by Kjetil Grutle and Ivar Peersen, except where noted; all music is composed by Peersen, except where noted.

No.	Title	Lyrics	Music	Length
1.	"Non-Being" (instrumental)			1:20
2.	"I Am Ice"	Grutle, Peersen, Johan Sara Jr.		5:02
3.	"Solar Will"			4:39
4.	"Mountain"			5:47
5.	"Spirit Helper"	Peersen, Kevin Kicking Woman	Peersen, Kevin Kicking Woman	4:52
6.	"Parting"	Peersen, Grutle		8:17
7.	"Tales of Trees"			4:44
8.	"I Miðju"			7:16
Total length:				41:53

== Personnel ==
Credits are adapted from the album's liner notes.

=== Enslaved ===
- Iver Sandøy – vocals, percussion, additional effects, percussive effects, synthesizers, engineering, recording
- Ivar Bjørnson – guitars, additional effects, percussive effects, synthesizers, production, engineering, recording, concept, art direction
- Grutle Kjellson – vocals, bass guitar, production, concept, art direction
- Håkon Vinje – keyboards, backing vocals
- Arve "Ice Dale" Isdal – lead guitars, guitars, engineering, recording

=== Additional personnel ===
- Johan Sara Jr. – vocals on "I Am Ice"
- Kevin Kicking Woman – vocals on "Spirit Helper"
- Vegard Lemme – assistant drum engineering
- Jens Bogren – mixing
- Tony Lindgren – mastering
- Arik Roper – cover
- Marcello Vasco – layout
- Sonja Chantik – band photo
- Marlene Gryge – mountain photo
- Sonja Elisabeth Storm Peerson – forest arrangement

== Charts ==
Chart performance for Mið
Chart (2026)	Peak position
Austrian Albums (Ö3 Austria)	31
French Physical Albums (SNEP)	51
French Rock & Metal Albums (SNEP)	19
German Albums (Offizielle Top 100)	61
German Rock & Metal Albums (Offizielle Top 100)	16
Norwegian Albums (IFPI Norge)	37
Norwegian Rock Albums (IFPI Norge)	4
Scottish Albums (Official Charts)	78
Swiss Albums (Schweizer Hitparade)	48
UK Independent Albums (Official Charts)	7
UK Rock & Metal Albums (Official Charts)	15
