= Axioma Ethica Odini =

Studio album by Enslaved
- Released: September 27, 2010
- Recorded: Duper Studios, Earshot Studios, Personal Sound
- Genre: Progressive black metal, Viking metal
- Length: 58:27
- Label: Indie, Nuclear Blast
- Producer: Enslaved

Enslaved chronology
Vertebrae (2008)	Axioma Ethica Odini (2010)	RIITIIR (2012)

Axioma Ethica Odini is the eleventh studio album by Norwegian extreme metal band Enslaved. It was released on September 27, 2010, via Indie Recordings in Europe and on September 28, 2010, via Nuclear Blast in North America. The cover artwork was created by Norwegian painter Truls Espedal who has created all of the band's artwork since 2001's Monumension. The album received very positive reviews from music critics, and sold around 1,400 copies in the United States its first week of release, landing at position no. 16 on the Top New Artist Albums (Heatseekers) chart.

== Background ==
According to Ivar Bjørnson, "The album came on the heels of our 2009 tour with Opeth, which introduced us to a lot of new people who discovered we might actually be something other than what they thought and it was good for us. It was a fresh, energetic album and it presented us to people in a little bit of a new way." The band had toured the United States with Opeth in May 2009.

== Musical style, writing, composition ==
The album title reflects the core concerns of the album's lyrics. It was originally intended to be split into two parts. According to Ivar Bjørnson:

'Axioma' "was from the basic form of Axiom in Latin, meaning self-evident truth. The whole process of natural universal truth, scientific truth contrasting to what Enslaved is doing which is very much about man-made truth. The starting point would be that everything is going on inside our heads." Grutle Kjellson explained that "The words Ethica Odini are the Latin translation of an Old Norse poem called Hávamál (Haavamaal) from 1655 I think, it can be translated into The Ethics Of Odin. It became a 3-word title actually by coincidence, Ethica Odini was supposed to be a sub-title, but the artist painted the words in a row. We saw at it and felt it looked better."

"The poem and Ethica Odini are our biggest axiom. Old ethics, old wisdom, old advice on how to interact oneself with nature and other human beings. The common spirituality, so to speak. It's kind of a fist in the face of monotheistic thinking. We feel that a lot of the old thoughts written down in that poem are very much translatable to modern day life in 2010, and we have lost a lot of that type of reasonable thinking along the way through enduring centuries of monotheism."

Musically the album is much heavier and more intense than band's previous few albums. "“Ethica Odini” simply explodes out of the gates with a ferocity we haven't heard since 2003's landmark Below the Lights, a thunderous, mid-paced gallop with guitars sounding nearly as icy as they did on 1994's Frost. It's enough to take the listener aback after years of comparatively sedate tunes." The album is still highly progressive however, with wide-ranging influences, and unconventional, complex song structures. AllMusic write that "Quieter passages, melodic arpeggios, contrast-giving keyboard parts, and Herbrand Larsen's distinctive clean singing still populate most every track, but largely in secondary roles (the predominantly gentle "Night Sight" being the only notable exception); which doesn't mean they are any less impactful", and that "the "progressive" label still looms tall among the top three or four genre descriptions applicable to Enslaved's ever-complex and unpredictable sound (psychedelics not so much this time around), and the fact that black metal does too is all that longtime acolytes could ask from a band honorable enough to hang onto their musical roots while constantly intriguing and captivating them with new experiments."

== Reception ==
=== Critical reception ===
Professional ratings
Review scores
Source	Rating
Aftenposten (no)	(6/6)
Allmusic	3.5/5 stars
BW&BK	(8/10)
Danger Dog	(3.75/5)
Decibel	(9/10)
Metal Hammer (de)	(7/7)
Sputnikmusic	5/5 stars
PopMatters	8/10 stars

The album received very positive reviews from music critics. AllMusic's Eduardo Rivadavia wrote that "the "progressive" label still looms tall among the top three or four genre descriptions applicable to Enslaved's ever-complex and unpredictable sound (psychedelics not so much this time around), and the fact that black metal does too is all that longtime acolytes could ask from a band honorable enough to hang onto their musical roots while constantly intriguing and captivating them with new experiments." Sputnikmusic's Adam Thomas gave the album a perfect score, describing it as the band's "masterwork". He particularly praised the band's ability to combine their black metal sound with much more diverse influences, writing that "It is truly astounding the way Enslaved continue to find new ways of combining their downright primeval and bestial minimalist metal framework with heavenly leads and progressive flourishes without ever faltering." PopMatters' also praised the band's songwriting, writing that "What's been at the core of Enslaved's music from 2004's Isa and onward is not heaviness and aggression, but rather dynamics. They've been getting better and better at offsetting the chilly atmospherics and pulverizing brutality with contemplative moments that stress melody, but Axioma Ethica Odini is so adept at shifting gears that the band makes it feel effortless." Concluding his review, "Axioma Ethica Odini is less a reinvention by Enslaved than an encapsulation of all of the strongest aspects of their music over the past decade. Theirs remains one of the most distinct sounds in all of metal, and while they've never been short of inspiration on record, they've outdone themselves here with their best album since 2003.

=== Accolades ===
Publication	Award	Rank
About.com	2010 Best Heavy Metal Albums	1
AllMusic	Favorite Metal Albums of 2010	-
Metal Hammer	Album of the month	1
PopMatters	Best Metal Albums of 2010	4
Spellemannprisen	Best Metal Album of 2010	-
Stereogum	Top 50 Metal Albums of 2010	31

== Track listing ==
All music is composed by Ivar Bjørnson

No.	Title	Lyrics	Length
1.	"Ethica Odini"	Grutle Kjellson	7:59
2.	"Raidho"	Bjørnson	6:01
3.	"Waruun"	Bjørnson	6:42
4.	"The Beacon"	Kjellson	5:38
5.	"Axioma"	Kjellson, Bjørnson	2:20
6.	"Giants"	Kjellson	6:37
7.	"Singular"	Bjørnson	7:43
8.	"Night Sight"	Bjørnson	7:36
9.	"Lightening"	Kjellson	7:51
Total length:			58:27

Bonus 7-inch EP
No.	Title	Length
1.	"Jotunblod (Doom)"	5:10
2.	"Migration"	4:56
Total length:		10:06

== Personnel ==
- Grutle Kjellson (K. Grutle) – bass, vocals, additional synthesizer
- Ivar Bjørnson (I. S. Peersen) – lead & rhythm guitars, synthesizer
- Arve Isdal – lead & rhythm guitars
- Herbrand Larsen – keyboards, synthesizers, organ, vocals
- Cato Bekkevold – drums, percussion

== Production ==
- Arranged By Enslaved; Published By Sony/ATV Music Scandinavia
- Produced by Ivar Bjørnson, Grutle Kjellson, Herbrand Larsen (with Iver Sandoy co-producing drums)
- Engineered By Iver Sandoy (at Duper & Solslottet Studios), Ivar Bjørnson, Arve Isdal & Herbrand Larsen
- Mixed by Jens Bogren at Fascination Street Studios in Örebro, Sweden
- Mastered by Chris Sansom at Propeller Music Division in Oslo, Norway
  - (Note: Ivar, Herbrand & Arve handled the engineering at Earshot Studios as a team, while Ivar handled the engineering at Peersen Studios by himself.)

== Charts ==
Chart (2010)	Peak position
German Newcomer Chart	6
Norwegian Albums (VG-lista)	11
US Heatseekers Albums (Billboard)	16
