= Vertebra (disambiguation) =

A vertebra is a bone in the spinal column of a vertebrate animal.

Vertebra may also refer to:

- Vertebra (software), an environment for developing distributed software applications
- Vertebrae (album), the album by Norwegian metal band Enslaved

== See also ==
- Vertebrate, an animal that has vertebrae
