= Hordanes Land =

EP by Enslaved
- Released: May 1993
- Recorded: September–October 1992
- Studios: Lydloftet, Ølen, Norway
- Genre: Black metal
- Length: 30:49
- Language: Norwegian
- Label: Candlelight
- Producers: Enslaved, Kjetil Ulland, Knut Bjarne Bjørkhuag, R. Torsen

Enslaved chronology
Yggdrasill (1992)	Hordanes Land (1993)	Vikingligr Veldi (1994)

Professional ratings
Review scores
Source	Rating
AllMusic	3/5 stars
AllMusic	(re-release with Vikingligr Veldi)
Collector's Guide to Heavy Metal	5/10

Hordanes Land is the debut EP by Norwegian extreme metal band Enslaved. It was released in May 1993, through Candlelight Records, and was also released as a split album a few weeks later with Emperor's self-titled EP. It was a key release in the development of Viking metal. In 2013, Decibel ranked the split release at number 29 on its list of the Top 100 Black Metal Albums of All Time.

== Track listing ==
No.	Title	Writer(s)	Length
1.	"Slaget i skogen bortenfor/Epilog/Slaget" ("The Battle in the Forest Beyond/Epilogue/The Battle")	Ivar Bjørnson, Ivan Pawle	13:10
2.	"Allfǫðr Oðinn" ("All-Father Odin")	Bjørnson	7:50
3.	"Balfǫr (or Balfar)/Andi fara/Prologr" ("Journey by Fire/Departure of the Soul/Prologue")	Bjørnson	9:49
4.	""Enslaved" (picture disc lp bonus track)"		6:10

== Personnel ==
Enslaved

- Grutle Kjellson – bass guitar, vocals, production
- Ivar Bjørnson – guitar, keyboards, synthesizers, special effects, production
- Trym Torson – drums, percussion, production

Production

- Kjetil Ulland, Knut Bjarne Bjørkhuag, R. Torsen – producers, engineers
