= Heimdal (album) =

Studio album by Enslaved
- Released: 3 March 2023
- Recorded: January 2021–April 2022
- Studios: Duper; Crow's Nest; Conclave & Earshot; Overlook Hotel; Fascination Street
- Genres: Black metal, progressive metal
- Length: 48:26
- Label: Nuclear Blast
- Producers: Iver Sandøy; Ivar Bjørnson; Grutle Kjellson

Enslaved chronology
Caravans to the Outer Worlds (2021)	Heimdal (2023)	Mið (2026)

Heimdal is the sixteenth studio album by Norwegian extreme metal band Enslaved, released 3 March 2023 by Nuclear Blast.

== Background ==
The album is titled after a character in Norse mythology, whom the band calls "fascinating" and who has appeared in their lyrics several times throughout their career, starting as early as their second demo tape, Yggdrasill, in 1992. The album contains six new songs, plus "Caravans to the Outer Worlds" which had previously appeared on an EP of the same title in 2021. The band structured that stopgap EP as a bridge between their previous full-length album Utgard (2020) and Heimdal, and determined that the song "Caravans to the Outer Worlds" fit into the new album both lyrically and musically.

== Critical reception ==
Upon its release, Heimdal received positive reviews from heavy metal-oriented publications. Kerrang! called the album "stunning" and described it as "a foundation of black metal at its most vast and Pink Floyd at their most spacious." Blabbermouth praised the album and concluded that Enslaved can "still find a way to remain true to their origins while defining extreme metal progression." Distorted Sound noted that some songs have a "part prog and part white-knuckled black metal" sound.

Rock n' Load, also suggested that Heimdal might be one of Enslaved's best albums, and that it was more engaging than their last several studio albums. MetalSucks called the album "Awe-inspiring, spellbinding, and imaginative," and concluded that "Heimdal reflects total authenticity combined with artistic brilliance." According to Ghost Cult, Heimdal is "a grand vision that Enslaved have executed to perfection, on an album that is up there with their best." A reviewer for No Clean Singing found some of the songwriting to be predictable, but concluded that the album "finds Enslaved once more turning their gaze towards new horizons."

== Track listing ==
No.	Title	Lyrics	Music	Length
1.	"Behind the Mirror"	Ivar Peersen	Peersen; Iver Sandøy; Kjetil Grutle	6:20
2.	"Congelia"	Peersen	Peersen; Sandøy; Grutle	8:01
3.	"Forest Dweller"	Grutle	Peersen; Sandøy	5:56
4.	"Kingdom"	Peersen	Peersen; Sandøy; Grutle	5:52
5.	"The Eternal Sea"	Peersen	Peersen; Sandøy; Grutle	7:25
6.	"Caravans to the Outer Worlds"	Peersen	Peersen; Sandøy; Grutle	6:45
7.	"Heimdal"	Grutle	Peersen; Sandøy	8:07
Total length:				48:26

== Personnel ==
Enslaved

- Grutle Kjellson – vocals, bass guitar, synthesizer
- Ivar Bjørnson – electric guitars, acoustic guitars, synthesizers, keyboards, sequencer, FX
- Arve Isdal – electric guitars
- Håkon Vinje – keyboards, piano, vocals
- Iver Sandøy – drums, percussion, keyboards, FX, vocals

Additional personnel

- Eilif Gundersen – gjallarhorn (track 1)
- Jens Bogren – additional vocals (track 1)

Production

- Ivar Bjørnson, Iver Sandøy – engineering, recording, production
- Arve Isdal – engineering, recording
- Grutle Kjellson – production
- Jens Bogren – mixing
- Tony Lindgren – mastering

== Charts ==
Chart performance for Heimdal
Chart (2023)	Peak position
Austrian Albums (Ö3 Austria)	51
German Albums (Offizielle Top 100)	26
Scottish Albums (Official Charts)	31
Swiss Albums (Schweizer Hitparade)	27
UK Album Downloads (Official Charts)	30
UK Independent Albums (Official Charts)	10
UK Rock & Metal Albums (Official Charts)	6
