= Live Retaliation =

Live DVD by Enslaved

Professional ratings
Review scores
Source	Rating
AllMusic	3/5 stars

Live Retaliation is the first live DVD by Norwegian extreme metal band Enslaved. Some pressings of the DVD included a bonus EP.

== DVD track listing ==
1. "Intro" – 2:03
2. "Convoys to Nothingness" – 8:04
3. "Jotunblod" – 3:52
4. "The Voices" – 5:42
5. "As Fire Swept Clean the Earth" – 6:39
6. "Heimdallr" – 5:20
7. "Loke" – 3:42
8. "Queen of Night" – 5:43
9. "Mardraum" – 5:21
10. "Ridicule Swarm" – 4:48
11. "Wotan 3:38
12. "Retribution for the Dead" – 4:38
13. "Thanking the Band" – 0:39
14. "Slaget I Skogen Bortenfor" – 7:56

== Bonus EP track listing ==
1. "Sleipnr (previously unreleased)" – 4:08
2. "Svarte Vidder (pre-production)" – 8:27
3. "Wotan (pre-production)" – 4:35
4. "Gylfaginning (pre-production)" – 5:19
5. "Jotunblod (pre-production)" – 4:10
6. "Viking Metal (live)" – 5:01
