= In Times =

Studio album by Enslaved
- Released: 6 March 2015
- Recorded: September & October 2014
- Studios: Duper & Solslottet Studios, Earshot & Conclave Studios, Personal Sound (Bergen, Norway), Tveita Lydkokeri (Valevåg, Norway)
- Genres: Progressive metal, black metal
- Length: 53:05
- Label: Nuclear Blast
- Producers: Ivar Bjørnson, Grutle Kjellson, Herbrand Larsen, Iver Sandøy

Enslaved chronology
RIITIIR (2012)	In Times (2015)	E (2017)

In Times is the thirteenth studio album by Norwegian extreme metal band Enslaved. It was released on 6 March 2015 in Europe, 9 March 2015 in the UK and 10 March 2015 in the US, on the Nuclear Blast label. As the title suggests, the album's central theme is that of time, considered philosophically, historically and mythologically. The album sold about 2,950 copies in its first week in the United States, making it their highest sales debut to date. The album charted in some territories in its first week of release, including Norway and Finland. It is also the band's last album with keyboardist/vocalist Herbrand Larsen, who departed the following year.

== Musical style and writing ==
In Times marks a further move to a more progressive sound following similar trends on their last few albums. Some reviewers see Herbrand Larsen as responsible for this change, with Exclaim! stating that "the secret star of the record may be keyboardist Herbrand Larsen, whose role in the band has expanded markedly over the past few albums and really comes to the fore on In Times". Loudwire agree, writing in their review that "with each passing album, keyboardist Herbrand Larsen has become a more integral part of the band utilizing his soothing clean vocals to contrast and compliment Grutle’s uncompromising rasp". Ivar Bjørnson of the band told Blabbermouth in an interview that In Times "is the most consistent body of work we have so far: it incorporates our 'blacker' past with our influences from prog rock, our present sense of absolute freedom, and the joy of being in this band".

According to Bjørnson, the title "reflects the existence of multiple realities across ‘places’ and times; both physically and metaphorically. Every bit of thought or reflection involves a variety of times, unconsciously – the past, the present, the future, mythological times, deep time, psychological timelines and so on. So this album is a meditation on the concept of being aware and working with times actively to achieve new situations according to the will. The title makes me think of life, death, runes, esoteric traditions/magic, mythology, gods, quantum physics… everything and nothing and everything". In a separate interview, he said that "it is about “times" and existing in and across several times, the same way you have in mythological or a mystical perspective of time, creation and the forthcoming, the end of the world. It was interesting enough that we have philosophies and science, not like in mythology, (in this) everything is certain. It was Christianity (and other religions) that first introduced the concept of the world ending, with no more beginnings after that. So that's one perspective."

== Recording and production ==
The album was recorded in Bergen, Norway, and was mixed in Sweden by Jens Bogren at his Fascination Street Studios. The first track to be written for the album was 'Thurisaz Dreaming', following their Australian tour, and according to Bjørnson set the tone for the rest of the album. An article in Terrorizer explains that "some of the album’s weirder textures and sounds were conducted deep in the woods of Valevåg, south of Bergen, in a mobile studio adding that "you can definitely hear the earthy, organic feel this has given the album". Kjellson has said that the band wished to capture a more "organic" sound in the recording of this album, and that "We decided we wanted to have a more live music approach. We decided to record the drums, bass and rhythm guitars live in the studio. I think we were onto something then so we decided to go for that this time as well and this time we decided to rehearse a lot more prior to recording so, it was pretty flawless this time. We were careful so we had a good time, the three of us recording the main themes, bass guitars and drums."

The liner notes for the album include a note that reads "All Hello Kitty-ride playing dedicated to Fenriz". This is in reference to a comment Fenriz made in regard to a ride cymbal pattern often used by Enslaved.

== Critical reception ==
Professional ratings
Aggregate scores
Source	Rating
Metacritic	78/100
Review scores
Source	Rating
About.com	4.5/5 stars
AllMusic	4/5 stars
Blabbermouth	10/10
Exclaim!	8/10
Loudwire	favourable
Metal Hammer	4/5 stars
Pitchfork Media	6.2/10
Sputnikmusic	4/5
Ultimate Guitar	8.3/10

In Times received mostly positive reviews from music critics. On the Metacritic website, which aggregates reviews from critics and assigns a normalised rating out of 100, the album received a score of 78 based on 4 reviews. The German variant of Metal Hammer named In Times as album of the month in its March 2015 issue. Writing for Pitchfork, Andy O'Connor review argued that "there isn't a whole lot differentiating one song from another, and many [songs] feel longer than they are", and states that the album is "competent musically but too timid to go into the depths, emotional, musical or otherwise, that black metal should strive for." Loudwire's Joe DiVita states that "the ever-consistent Enslaved have churned out another album to cement their legendary status in a style they continue to call their own". Thom Jurek's review for AllMusic described the album as "a continuum of the sonic approach they began exploring on 2001's Monumension, mixing black metal with "progressive elements, sonic ambiences, and even psychedelic explorations", and summarises the review by calling the album "vital, bracing music". In her review for Exclaim!, Natalie Zina Walschots states that "Enslaved have hit a sweet spot with In Times, experimenting just enough to keep everything interesting while also offering up pure aggressive pleasure so decadent it seems almost indulgent".

== Track listing ==
All lyrics are written by K Grutle and Ivar Bjørnson; all music is composed by Ivar Bjørnson.

No.	Title	Lyrics	Length
1.	"Thurisaz Dreaming"	Bjørnson	8:13
2.	"Building with Fire"	Grutle	8:49
3.	"One Thousand Years of Rain"	Grutle	8:13
4.	"Nauthir Bleeding"	Grutle/Bjørnson	8:10
5.	"In Times"	Bjørnson	10:44
6.	"Daylight"	Grutle/Bjørnson	8:56
Total length:			53:05

== Personnel ==
Enslaved

- Grutle Kjellson – vocals, basses, double bass, bass pedals, FX
- Ivar Bjørnson – guitars, backing vocals, synthesizer, FX, piano
- Cato Bekkevold – drums
- Herbrand Larsen – vocals, organ, keyboards
- Ice Dale – guitars, backing vocals

Extra personnel

- Iver Sandøy – additional FX, backing vocal
- Einar "Kvitrafn" Selvik – special vocal appearance on "One Thousand Years of Rain"

== Chart performance ==
Chart (2015)	Peak position
Belgian Albums (Ultratop Flanders)	116
Belgian Albums (Ultratop Wallonia)	191
Dutch Albums (Album Top 100)	97
French Albums (SNEP)	122
Finnish Albums (Suomen virallinen lista)	39
German Albums (Offizielle Top 100)	66
Norwegian Albums (VG-lista)	21
UK Rock & Metal Albums Chart	9
US Top Hard Rock Albums (Billboard)	8
US Heatseekers Albums (Billboard)	4
US Independent Albums (Billboard)	16
US Top Rock Albums (Billboard)	25
US Indie Store Album Sales (Billboard)	12
