= Engine Yard =

American company

Engine Yard, Inc.
- Type: Subsidiary
- Industry: Software industry
- Founded: 2006
- Founder: Ezra Zygmuntowicz; Lance Walley; Tom Mornini; Jayson Vantuyl
- Headquarters: San Francisco, United States
- Key people: Beau Vrolyk; Alan Cyron; Dave McAllister
- Products: Engine Yard
- Parent: DevGraph
- Website: www.engineyard.com

Engine Yard is a privately held platform as a service company focused on Ruby on Rails, PHP and Node.js deployment and management. Founded in San Francisco, California, in 2006, it was acquired by Crossover in 2017 and has since been operated as part of DevGraph, a suite of developer tools from DevFactory FZ LLC, an ESW Capital group company.

== History ==
Engine Yard, founded in 2006, offers a cloud application management platform. Engine Yard cofounders include Tom Mornini, Lance Walley and Ezra Zygmuntowicz.

John Dillon joined Engine Yard as CEO in 2009. He previously held the position of CEO at Salesforce.com from 1999 to 2001.

Engine Yard has sponsored a number of open-source projects since 2009.

In August 2011, Engine Yard acquired Orchestra.io to add PHP expertise to the Engine Yard team and platform. In September 2011, the company launched a partner program that includes over 40 cloud technology companies. These partners provide add-on services such as application performance management, email deliverability, load testing and more, within the Engine Yard Platform.

In November 2011, the company added the Node.js server-side framework into its PaaS.

In early 2012, Engine Yard reported that its revenue doubled year over year to $28 million in 2011, and the number of paying customers rose 50 percent to 2,000 in that time. Engine Yard claims that with its $28 million in revenue for 2011 it is the leading open platform as a service.

Early in 2013, under the guidance of Eamon Leonard and PJ Hagerty, Engine Yard began what many recognize as the first Developer Relations team. Bringing together content, events, and other outreach ideas, the team delivered to developers educational and promotional materials. The methods used were shared with GitHub, Twilio, and New Relic in an effort to improve the experience of developers across the board.

In June 2013, Engine Yard formed a strategic alliance with Microsoft and went live on Windows Azure marketplace on July 31, 2013. Developers can use this open source Platform-as-a-Service running on Microsoft cloud infrastructure to deploy web and mobile apps.

In April 2015, Engine Yard announced the acquisition of OpDemand and their container PaaS Deis.

In April 2017, Microsoft acquired container platform Deis from Engine Yard and Engine Yard announced it was being acquired by Crossover, a provider of cloud-based Ruby teams.

Following the acquisition, the company said it intended to refocus on its Ruby on Rails origins. In August 2020, Engine Yard released Engine Yard Kontainers (EYK), a Kubernetes-based container platform that runs on Amazon Web Services. Engine Yard is marketed alongside ScaleArc, CloudFix, CodeFix and DevSpaces as part of the DevGraph product family.

== Funding ==
In January 2008, Engine Yard received an investment of $3.5 million from Benchmark Capital. Some industry commentators interpreted this as an investment in Ruby on Rails.

In July 2008, Engine Yard secured an additional $15 million from a combination of Benchmark Capital, New Enterprise Associates, and Amazon.

In October 2009, Engine Yard received an additional $19 million in funding from a combination of Benchmark Capital, New Enterprise Associates, Amazon, Bay Partners, Presidio Ventures and DAG Ventures, for a total of $37.5 million in funding.

In November 2012, Oracle Corporation announced that it made a strategic minority investment in Engine Yard. Financial details of the investment were not disclosed. Engine Yard remained an independent company until its acquisition by Crossover in 2017.

== See also ==
- FogBugz
- Vertebra (software)
