= Lex Talion =

Argentine metal band

- Origin: La Plata, Buenos Aires, Argentina
- Genres: Viking metal, folk metal, pagan metal
- Years active: 2010–present
- Members: Ramiro J. Pellizzari; Federico Vogliolo; Manuel "Anvil" Luna
- Past members: Elías Gonzalez Bader; Daniela Martinez; Lautaro Rueda
- Website: http://www.lex-talion.com

Lex Talion is a Viking Metal/Folk Metal band founded in La Plata, Argentina.

== Music ==
Including various influences from different subgenres of Metal music and some symphonic passages, they achieved a musical balance with an identity of its own, together with lyrics that range from social protest to paganism and Scandinavian mythology.

== Biography ==
Formed in 2010 as a solo project of Ramiro J. Pellizzari (guitar/vocals), but gradually evolved when Elias Gonzalez Bader (bass) and Federico Vogliolo (guitar/vocals) and its style was shaped and redefined.

In 2012 the band edit their first full length album “Funeral in the Forest” independently, which granted them several interviews and reviews on international magazines such as Metal Hammer (Germany) or Dark City (Russia) among others.

In the year 2013, The band sign their first record deal with the Russian label "Metal Renaissance Records" who distributed the material throughout East Europe. The album was also put in stores in Japan and other Asian countries.

Between 2014 and 2016, the band complete their line-up with Lautaro Rueda (drums) and Daniela Martínez (keyboards) and begin giving a series of live concerts and participating in festivals with great response from the audience.

In 2017, the new bassist, Manuel Luna, joins the band and they release an EP called "Nightwing" promoting their oncoming second studio album with a much more polished production and a completely different and more aggressive sound from its predecessor. A promotional video for the song "King Of Death" is also released in late 2017.

In 2018, following the line of production of "Nightwing", the band releases its second full-length album, "Sons Of Chaos", signing record deals in Japan and Australia and preparing to perform their first international shows.

== Members ==
- Ramiro J. Pellizzari – Guttural Vocals / Guitar / Hurdy-Gurdy
- Federico Vogliolo – Clean Vocals / Guitar
- Manuel "Anvil" Luna – Bass Guitar

== Former Members ==
- Lautaro Rueda - Drums
- Elias Gonzalez Bader - Bass Guitar
- Daniela Martínez - Keyboards

== Discography ==
Year	Format	Title
2012	EP	Blood & Mead
2012	CD	Funeral in the Forest
2013	Single	Death to the King!
2017	EP	Nightwing
2018	CD	Sons Of Chaos

=== Videos ===
- "The Kingdom of the Forgotten" (2013)
- "King of Death" (2017)
- "Sons Of Chaos" (2019)

== See also ==
- List of Viking metal bands
- List of folk metal bands
