= Morgarten (band) =

Swiss band

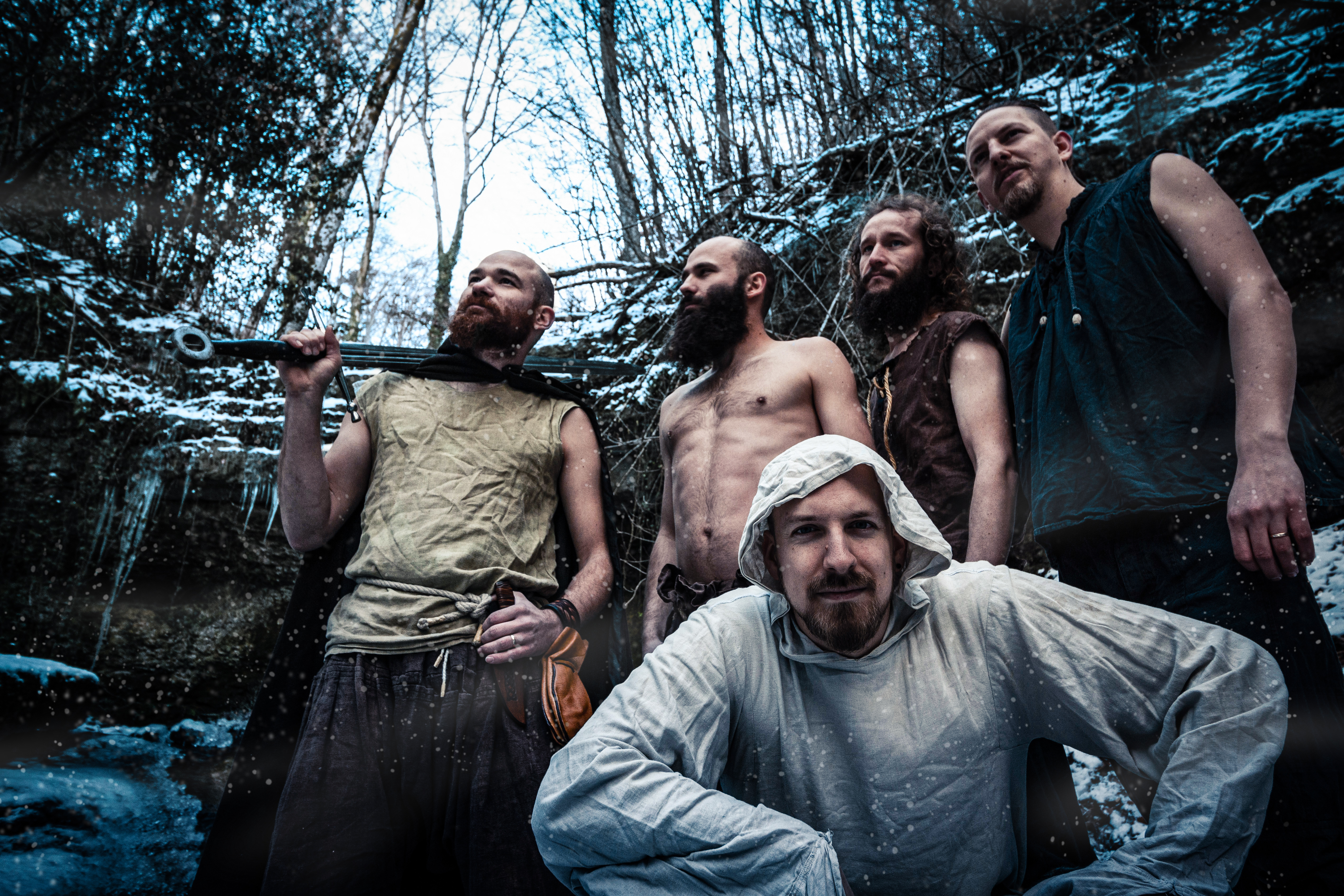

Background information
- Origin: Switzerland
- Genres: Black metal, Folk metal
- Years active: Since 2005
- Label: Inner Wound Recordings
- Members: Pierric Weber; Ilann Porret; Cédric Volet; Maël Porret; Joël Volet
- Website: www.morgarten.net

Morgarten is a band of folk – black metal founded in Neuchâtel, Switzerland in 2005. The band performed in many European countries alongside in particular Finntroll, Wind Rose, Saor, Finsterforst and Kvaen.

== Biography ==
The group's name comes from the legendary Battle of Morgarten, which took place on 15 November south of Zürich. There, a few Swiss Confederates pushed back the Duke Leopold I, Duke of Austria, Lord of Habsburg. The themes of their songs are mainly taken from Swiss history and heroic fantasy.

They released their first self-produced album, "Risen to Fight", in 2015. For their second album, "Cry of the Lost", the band signed a recorddeal with Inner Wound Recordings from Sweden. The album was released in 2021. It is freely inspired by the story of Arnold von Winkelried.

After the release of "Risen to Fight" Morgarten toured all over Europe and played festivals like Dark Troll Festival, Mead & Greed, Heathen Gathering, Cernunnos Pagan Fest, March Into Walhalla and Mahlstrom Open Air. In 2025 the band played their biggest show at Hellfest in France.

The group's keyboardist, Maël Porret, is also Swiss champion of acrobatic paragliding solo in 2020.

== Members ==
- Pierric Weber: Vocals and Guitar
- Ilann Porret: Guitar and Vocals
- Cédric Volet: Bass guitar and Backing vocals
- Maël Porret: Keyboard
- Joël Volet: Drums

== Discography ==
- Risen to Fight (2016)
- Cry of the Lost (2021)

== Videography ==
=== Clips ===
- Wind from the Forest
- To Victory

=== Lyric videos ===
- Tales of My Lands
- The Last Breath
