= Ståle Økland =

Norwegian writer (born 1976)

Ståle Økland (born 21 April 1976) is a Norwegian writer, thinker, trend expert and public speaker. He grew up in Bryne, Leverkusen, and Paris. He currently lives in Oslo, Norway.

== Early life ==
Økland's academic background is studies in sociology, history and German language.

== Career ==
Økland started his career in the advertising industry as a copywriter with an advertising company in Stavanger, Norway. He shortly became a creative director in the agency, and later partner and managing director. In 2007 he founded a Norwegian trend agency called Domene Fem AS.

Økland discusses issues relating to the fields of consumption, technology, trade and society, and current topics of relevance to the business community such as globalization, social and cultural change, innovation, strategic management and retail trends. He has given keynote speeches at many European conferences.

Økland has also had a political career, among others as vice-mayor of Time Municipality, Norway (2003-2005). He is the eldest son of the former Norwegian footballer Arne Larsen Økland.

== Publications ==
- Datakrasj (2015)
- Bykamp (2014), together with Nicolai Strøm Olsen.
- Tenk som en rockestjerne (2013)
- Trendmania (2011) Trendmania
