= RIITIIR =

Studio album by Enslaved
- Released: 28 September 2012
- Recorded: January – March 2012
- Studio: Duper & Solslottet Studios, Earshot & Conclave Studios, Personal Sound in Bergen, Norway
- Genre: Progressive black metal; Viking metal
- Length: 67:19
- Label: Indie, Nuclear Blast
- Producer: Enslaved

Enslaved chronology
| Axioma Ethica Odini (2010) | RIITIIR (2012) | In Times (2015) |

RIITIIR, occasionally typeset as "RIITIIЯ," is the twelfth studio album by Norwegian extreme metal band Enslaved. It was released on September 28, 2012 in Europe and on October 9, 2012 in North America. The name RIITIIR is Ivar Bjørnson's "Norse-ified" take on the words "Rites/Rituals", or "The Rites of Man", and rituals form the central concept of the album. The album received positive reviews from music critics, and sold around 2,300 copies in its first week of release in the United States, which made it their highest debuting album to date in terms of sales.

== Musical style and writing ==
BBC Music described the album as "a complex, schizophrenic work, verging on the overly sensorial at points, leaving the listener feeling as if they’ve been repeatedly bashed over the head with a really clever hammer. It’s marked by sudden shifts in tempo and disposition, propelled by unhinged rhythms: check the title track’s arabesque, Melechesh-like pummel." They also noted that keyboardist Herbrand Larsen's clean vocals "dominate" the album, "imbuing its eight tracks with a sheen of accessibility that may test the tolerance of some."

Lyrically, the songs all draw to some extent on the theme of rituals, which the album title refers to. Some of the songs take a historical perspective on pre-monotheistic religions around the world and their purpose. The opening song 'Thoughts Like Hammers' takes a philosophical perspective on the role of ritual and philosophy as an "engine for change". Others deal with the inner state and psychological side of rituals. Bjørnson has said that "We have all these different angles that are looking at that, because it is evidently quite important. It holds the key to other things. We’re not concluding, we’re more asking, I guess, and exploring through our asking, is the ritual seeking to cause physical change in the world, to alter reality, or is it actually more trying to change the perception?"

== Artwork ==
According to Kjellson, the artwork "deals with certain forces that all human beings share and/or have in common. More relevant in ancient times than in modern times, we’ve moved away from human instincts to a certain extent. We have looked at all the mythology, the Indian, Egyptian and Norse. You can find loads of the same ways of looking at life, approaching life, and taking the first steps so to speak. We shared more or less the same philosophy, the same approach to life. Didn’t matter where it came from, didn’t matter who you talk to. There’s a lot of common deities, the basics of the first primal steps, the first primal rituals of man, of civilizations. And these civilizations didn’t have any contact at all, it’s very interesting how humans come to think the same way, we share some instincts."

== Critical reception ==
Professional ratings
Aggregate scores
| Source | Rating |
|---|---|
| Metacritic | 64/100 |
Review scores
| Source | Rating |
| Blabbermouth | 9/10 |
| Decibel Magazine | 9/10 stars |
| Metalsucks | 4.5/5 stars |
| Pitchfork | 6.4/10 |
| Revolver | 3/5 |

RIITIIR received mostly positive reviews from music critics. Exclaim!'s Natalie Zina Walschots praised the album, describing it as "vast and breathtaking" and "simply stellar". Walschots wrote that "The spiralling, tentacle-like guitar structures are as muscular as there are strange, probing and exploring. The drumming creates a vastness, a sense of space that sounds capable of containing galaxies, but then a startlingly bare acoustic guitar passage, like the one at the end of "Death in the Eyes of Dawn," suddenly becomes intimate and lonely. Grutle Kjellson's trademark harsh vocals find a counterpoint in Herbrand Larson's melodic clean singing, and the two styles often duel one another, caught in each other's inexorable orbit." Pitchfork's Grayson Currin was more critical of the album, describing it as "a restless and sometimes laborious album that attempts to spotlight all of Enslaved's parts in one very overbearing package. For 67 minutes, one shift only gives way to another surprise, enabling an album that's busy enough to be called boring." He did however note that this "doesn't mean that these 67 minutes are without their rewards. Enslaved are still very good at generating ideas, if not sequencing or filtering them on RIITIIR. The ferocious blast that begins "Thoughts Like Hammers", for instance, is rapturous. Several of Larsen's sections are sharp enough to be called catchy, too; indeed, throughout RIITIIR, many of the less claustrophobic moments offer a balmy respite in the midst of the spastic, ceaseless changes."

== Track listing ==
All music is composed by Ivar Bjørnson.

| No. | Title | Lyrics | Length |
|---|---|---|---|
| 1. | "Thoughts Like Hammers" | Ivar Bjørnson | 9:30 |
| 2. | "Death in the Eyes of Dawn" | Grutle Kjellson | 8:17 |
| 3. | "Veilburner" | Bjørnson | 6:46 |
| 4. | "Roots of the Mountain" | Bjørnson | 9:16 |
| 5. | "RIITIIR" | Kjellson | 5:26 |
| 6. | "Materal" | Bjørnson | 7:48 |
| 7. | "Storm of Memories" | Bjørnson | 8:58 |
| 8. | "Forsaken" | Kjellson | 11:15 |
| Total length: | | | 67:19 |

== Personnel ==
- Grutle Kjellson – bass, bass pedals, vocals, production
- Ivar Bjørnson – lead guitar, rhythm guitar, synthesizer, production
- Arve Isdal – lead guitar, rhythm guitar
- Herbrand Larsen – keyboards, synthesizers, clean vocals, production
- Cato Bekkevold – drums, percussion
- Jens Bogren – mixing
- Tony Lindgren – mastering
- Iver Sandøy – production
- Truls Espedal – artwork

== Charts ==
| Chart (2012) | Peak position |
|---|---|
| Austrian Albums (Ö3 Austria) | 70 |
| Belgian Albums (Ultratop Wallonia) | 196 |
| Finnish Albums (Suomen virallinen lista) | 47 |
| French Albums (SNEP) | 118 |
| German Albums (Offizielle Top 100) | 72 |
| Norwegian Albums (VG-lista) | 15 |
| Swiss Albums (Schweizer Hitparade) | 92 |
