= Blodhemn =

Studio album by Enslaved
- Released: 28 October 1998
- Recorded: 1998
- Studio: The Abyss, Pärlby, Sweden
- Genre: Viking metal; black metal
- Length: 39:48
- Language: Norwegian, English
- Label: Osmose
- Producer: Peter Tägtgren

Enslaved chronology
Eld (1997)	Blodhemn (1998)	Mardraum – Beyond the Within (2000)

Blodhemn (Norwegian meaning "blood revenge") is the fourth studio album by Norwegian extreme metal band Enslaved. It was released on 28 October 1998, through Osmose Productions. The album was produced by Peter Tägtgren, and is the first Enslaved album recorded and produced at his Abyss studio, alongside the follow-up.

== Critical reception ==
Professional ratings
Review scores
Source	Rating
AllMusic	3/5 stars
Chronicles of Chaos	9/10
Collector's Guide to Heavy Metal	7/10
Rock Hard	7.5/10

AllMusic says that Blodhemn is Enslaved's "blackest" album, and a step forward in songwriting, due to its shorter, cleaner songs and compressed sound. It also describes the song structure as having rock and roll elements in "Urtical Gods" and "Nidingaslakt".

== Track listing ==
No.	Title	Lyrics	Music	Length
1.	"Intro. 'Audhumla; Birth of the Worlds'"			1:11
2.	"I lenker til Ragnarok (In Chains Until Ragnarok)"	Grutle Kjellson	Ivar Bjørnson	5:39
3.	"Urtical Gods"	Per Husebø	Bjørnson	3:20
4.	"Ansuz Astral"	Bjørnson	Bjørnson, Richard Kronheim	4:55
5.	"Nidingaslakt"	Kjellson	Kronheim	3:23
6.	"Eit auga til Mimir (An Eye for Mimir)"	Husebø, Kjellson, Kronheim	Kjellson	4:25
7.	"Blodhemn (Vengeance in Blood)"	Kjellson	Bjørnson, Kronheim	5:33
8.	"Brisinghamen"	Kjellson	Bjørnson, Kronheim	3:32
9.	"Suttungs mjød (Suttung's Mead)": "Outro 'Perkulator'"	(Traditional)	Kjellson, Bjørnson	7:47
Total length:				39:48

== Personnel ==
Enslaved

- Ivar Bjørnson – guitar, keyboards
- Grutle Kjellson – bass guitar, vocals
- Christian Kronheim – guitar
- Dirge Rep (Per Husebø) – drums
