= Vertebra (software) =

- Developer(s): Engine Yard
- Preview release: 0.3 beta / January 14, 2009
- Written in: Erlang and Ruby
- Operating system: Cross-platform
- Type: Cloud computing framework
- License: LGPL license
- Website: vertebra.engineyard.com

Vertebra is a framework that aims to simplify writing applications in The Cloud written by Engine Yard.

== Release ==
It was released under the GNU Lesser General Public License 3 at the end of 2008.

== Technologies ==
Vertebra is written in a combination of Ruby and Erlang.

== Public reception ==
It has been characterized as a Service-Oriented-Architecture for the cloud, an application deployment platform, and an evolution in the architecture for cloud computing. For its part, Engine Yard simply classifies it as "A Platform for the Cloud."
