= Eld (album) =

Studio album by Enslaved
- Released: 17 March 1997
- Recorded: December 1996 - January 1997
- Studio: Grieghallen, Bergen, Norway
- Genre: Black metal; Viking metal
- Length: 58:46
- Language: Norwegian
- Label: Osmose
- Producer: Pytten, Enslaved

Enslaved chronology
Frost (1994)	Eld (1997)	Blodhemn (1998)

Professional ratings
Review scores
Source	Rating
AllMusic	2.5/5 stars
Chronicles of Chaos	9/10
Collector's Guide to Heavy Metal	3/10
Rock Hard	7.5/10

Eld (English: Fire) is the third studio album by Norwegian extreme metal band Enslaved. It was released on 17 March 1997, through Osmose Productions.

== Background ==
The man featured on the album cover is Enslaved vocalist Grutle Kjellson.

== Track listing ==
All tracks are written by Ivar Bjørnson and Grutle Kjellson, except "Glemt" by Bjørnson.

No.	Title	Length
1.	"793 (Slaget om Lindisfarne)" ("793 (The Battle of Lindisfarne)")	16:10
2.	"Hordalendingen" ("The Man from Hordaland")	5:19
3.	"Alfablot" ("Sacrifice to the Elves")	6:33
4.	"Kvasirs blod" ("The Blood of Kvasir")	7:51
5.	"For lenge siden" ("A Long Time Ago")	8:08
6.	"Glemt" ("Forgotten")	8:04
7.	"Eld" ("Fire")	6:36
Total length:		58:46

== Personnel ==
Enslaved

- Ivar Bjørnson – guitar, keyboards, production
- Grutle Kjellson – bass guitar, vocals, production, sleeve booklet photography
- Harald Helgeson – drums, production

Production

- J.W.H. (Jannicke Wiese-Hansen) – logo designer
- Pytten (Eirik Hundvin) – production, engineering
- J. Traaen (Jørgen Træen) – engineering
- Karl Henrik Nymo – sleeve band photography
- S. Johnsen – sleeve booklet photography
