= Mardraum – Beyond the Within =

Studio album by Enslaved
- Released: 25 September 2000
- Recorded: February 2000
- Studio: The Abyss, Pärlby, Sweden
- Genre: Progressive black metal; black metal; Viking metal
- Length: 58:29
- Language: Norwegian
- Label: Osmose
- Producer: Enslaved

Enslaved chronology
Blodhemn (1998)	Mardraum – Beyond the Within (2000)	Monumension (2001)

Professional ratings
Review scores
Source	Rating
AllMusic	4/5 stars
Chronicles of Chaos	8/10

Mardraum – Beyond the Within is the fifth studio album by Norwegian extreme metal band Enslaved. It was released on 25 September 2000, through Osmose Productions.

== Track listing ==
No.	Title	Writer(s)	Length
1.	"Større enn tid – tyngre enn natt" (Greater than Time – Heavier than Night)	Richard Kronheim, Ivar Bjørnson	10:06
2.	"Daudningekvida" (Deadhymn)	Per Husebø, Kronheim, Bjørnson	3:30
3.	"Entrance-Escape" (Inngang-Flukt)	Kronheim, Bjørnson	7:42
4.	"Ormgard" (The Hive)	Bjørnson	5:28
5.	"Æges draum" (Aege's Dream)	Bjørnson, Kronheim	4:42
6.	"Mardraum" (Nightmare)	Grutle Kjellson, Bjørnson, Kronheim, Husebø	3:39
7.	"Det endelege riket" (The Finite Empire)	Bjørnson	5:19
8.	"Ormgard II: Kvalt i kysk høgsong" (The Hive II: Strangled by Purity)	Kjellson, Bjørnson	3:44
9.	"Krigaren eg ikkje kjende" (Warrior Unknown)	Kjellson	6:31
10.	"Stjerneheimen" (Starhome)	Bjørnson, Kronheim	5:46
11.	"Frøyas smykke" (Freya's Necklace)	Bjørnson	1:54
Total length:			58:29

== Personnel ==
Enslaved

- Grutle Kjellson – bass guitar, electronics, vocals, arrangement, production, mixing
- Ivar Bjørnson – guitar, keyboards, synthesizers, percussion, arrangement, production, mixing
- Christian Kronheim – guitar, arrangement, production, mixing
- Dirge Rep (Per Husebø) – drums, percussion, arrangement, production, mixing

Production

- Lars Szöke – recording, engineering
- Peter Tägtgren – recording, engineering, mixing
