= Frost (album) =

Studio album by Enslaved
- Released: 4 August 1994
- Recorded: June–July 1994
- Studios: Grieghallen, Bergen, Norway
- Genres: Viking metal; black metal
- Length: 50:10
- Language: Norwegian
- Label: Osmose
- Producers: Eirik Hundvin and Enslaved

Enslaved chronology
Vikingligr Veldi (1994)	Frost (1994)	Eld (1997)

Frost is the second studio album by Norwegian extreme metal band Enslaved. It was released in 1994, through Osmose Productions.

This would be the last album to feature drummer Trym Torson before he joined Emperor.

The band announced that they would play Frost in its entirety at the 2019 Decibel Metal & Beer Fest in Philadelphia, Pennsylvania.

== Layout ==
The photo on the front cover was taken by Svein Grønvold and appeared in the book Jotunheimen, published by Gyldendal Forlag in 1991.

== Critical reception ==
Professional ratings
Review scores
Source	Rating
AllMusic	4/5 stars
Collector's Guide to Heavy Metal	5/10
Rock Hard	9.0/10

AllMusic called the album "an important release for the extreme music subgenre of Viking metal", and also a "sizeable creative leap" for the band.

In 2013, Decibel ranked Frost at number 16 on its list of the Top 100 Black Metal Albums of All Time.

== Track listing ==
No.	Title	Writer(s)	Length
1.	"Frost"	Ivar Bjørnson	2:52
2.	"Loke"	Bjornson, Kjellson	4:21
3.	"Fenris"	Bjornson, Kjellson	7:16
4.	"Svarte vidder" ("Black Plains")	Bjornson	8:43
5.	"Yggdrasil"	Bjornson, Havamal	5:23
6.	"Jotunblod" ("Blood of Jotun")	Bjornson, Kjellson	4:07
7.	"Gylfaginning" ("The Tricking of Gylfi")	Bjornson, Kjellson	5:31
8.	"Wotan"	Bjornson, Kjellson	4:12
9.	"Isöders dronning" ("Queen of the Desolate Ice")	Bjornson	7:45
Total length:			50:10

== Personnel ==
Enslaved

- Grutle Kjellson – vocals, bass guitar, harmonica, arrangement, production, mixing
- Ivar Bjørnson – guitar, keyboards, production, mixing
- Trym Torson – drums, arrangement, production, mixing

Additional personnel

- Pytten – fretless bass guitar on "Yggdrasil", production, mixing, recording, engineering
- David Bertolini – recording, engineering
