= E (Enslaved album) =

Studio album by Enslaved
- Released: 13 October 2017
- Recorded: April & May 2017
- Studios: Duper & Solslottet Studios, Earshot & Conclave Studios, Peersonal Sound, Fascination Street Studios
- Genres: Progressive metal; black metal
- Length: 49:45 (standard version); 62:08 (with bonus tracks)
- Label: Nuclear Blast
- Producers: Grutle Kjellson, Ivar Bjørnson, Iver Sandøy

Enslaved chronology
In Times (2015)	E (2017)	Utgard (2020)

E is the fourteenth studio album by Norwegian extreme metal band Enslaved. It was released on October 13, 2017 by Nuclear Blast.

This is the first album recorded after the departure of longtime keyboardist and vocalist Herbrand Larsen, who left the band in late 2016 and was replaced by Håkon Vinje. This would also be the last album with Cato Bekkevold on drums before he departed in 2018.

The album received Norway's 2017 Spellemann Award for best metal album of the year.

== Artwork ==
The title of the album represents the initial letter of the band name but written with the runic character ehwaz (similar to 'M') on a minimalist and dark wooden cover art, created by designer and painter Truls Espedal. The concept of the symbol (which means 'horse'), is treated in a certain way in "Sacred Horse".

Enslaved songwriter and guitarist Ivar Bjørnson said:

[...] They (the Vikings) used an alphabet, the runes, twenty-four different symbols that were used both for writing, normal stuff like'this guy owns this few cows' and stuff, and then it was also used for esoteric works, or magic, as it were, in popular history. I guess behind each of those runes there was a meaning, and this particular one means ‘horse’, in mythology the most famous horse is Sleipnir, Odin’s own horse, the one with the eight legs. So, of course, it has a deeper meaning, like person and horse, it symbolises the whole concept of relationships and positive dependency. [...]

== Musical style and writing ==
The album maintains a musical style quite similar to its predecessor In Times (2015), although perhaps a little more melodic and atmospheric, following the base of progressive metal traditional.

The lyrical themes revolve around Norse mythology, vikings, and especially, around nature and ancient Nordic spirituality.

Bjørnson explains:

Everything we do and create are imitations of nature; as we evolved from nature, that is how it must be — yet modern man thinks he and she is independent of nature, that we somehow are so superior that we do not have to take nature into consideration other than as a backdrop for shitty movies. Or festivals. Losing touch with nature is basically to lose touch with being human.

== Recording and production ==
E was composed and written from April 2016 to March 2017. Subsequently, Iver Sandøy was hired again as the record producer. It was recorded at Duper & Solslottet Studios, Conclave & Earshot, Peersonal Sound in Bergen between April – May 2017 and was mixed and mastered by Jens Bogren at Fascination Street Studios in Örebro, Sweden in June 2017.

As usual in all Enslaved albums, E was once again written by the duo composer of guitarist Ivar Bjørnson (credited with his real name Ivar Peersen) and singer and bassist Grutle Kjellson, and also marks the introduction of their new keyboard master and clean vocalist Håkon Vinje of Seven Impale, a close collaborator of Bjørnson and Einar Selvik in their parallel musical project, called Skuggsjá.

The special edition of the album includes two bonus tracks (something unusual in Enslaved studio albums) recorded simultaneously but with no relation to the style of the rest: a black-doom song composed in Norwegian titled "Djupet" and a cover of the 2005 Röyksopp hit "What Else Is There?", performed mostly by Vinje.

Enslaved made music videos for the singles "Storm Son" and "The River's Mouth", both directed by Josh Graham, who previously worked with Soundgarden and Neurosis among others.

== Track listing ==
All music is composed by Ivar Peersen, except for track 8.

No.	Title	Lyrics	Length
1.	"Storm Son"	Kjetil Grutle / Ivar Peersen	10:54
2.	"The River's Mouth"	Peersen	5:12
3.	"Sacred Horse"	Grutle / Peersen	8:12
4.	"Axis of the Worlds"	Grutle	7:49
5.	"Feathers of Eolh"	Grutle	8:06
6.	"Hiindsiight"	Peersen	9:32
Total length:			49:45

Bonus tracks
No.	Title	Lyrics	Length
7.	"Djupet" (Deep)	Peersen	7:39
8.	"What Else Is There?" (Röyksopp cover)	Karin Dreijer / Röyksopp	4:44
Total length:			12:23

== Personnel ==
Enslaved

- Grutle Kjellson – vocals, basses, double bass, bass pedals, FX
- Ivar Bjørnson – guitars, backing vocals, synthesizer, FX, piano
- Cato Bekkevold – drums
- Håkon Vinje – vocals, organ, keyboards
- Ice Dale – guitars, backing vocals

Extra personnel

- Daniel Måge – flute (track 5)
- Kjetil Møster – saxophone (track 6)
- Einar Kvitrafn Selvik – vocals (track 6)
- Iver Sandøy – effects, drums (track 7)

== Charts ==
Chart (2017)	Peak position
Belgian Albums (Ultratop Flanders)	190
French Albums (SNEP)	155
German Albums (Offizielle Top 100)	80
Norwegian Albums (VG-lista)	12
Scottish Albums (Official Charts)	80
Swiss Albums (Schweizer Hitparade)	55
UK Independent Albums (Official Charts)	18
UK Rock & Metal Albums (Official Charts)	12
