= Below the Lights =

Studio album by Enslaved
- Released: 14 April 2003
- Recorded: September–October 2002, Greighallen Studios in Bergen
- Genres: Black metal; Viking metal; progressive metal
- Length: 46:17
- Label: Osmose
- Producers: Pytten, Jørgen Træen, Ivar Peersen, Grutle Kjellson

Enslaved chronology
Monumension (2001)	Below the Lights (2003)	Isa (2004)

Below the Lights is the seventh studio album by Norwegian extreme metal band Enslaved. It was released on 14 April 2003. Beyond it being their last full-length for production company Osmose (they would move to Candlelight for their next studio album), a few lineup changes would take place. This would be the last album Enslaved recorded with Dirge Rep on drums (he also co-wrote two songs), and the first album featuring Arve Isdal as lead guitarist. They would also enlist a full-time keyboardist in Herbrand Larsen (who helped engineer the record), bringing the band personnel from four to five.

== Critical reception ==
AllMusic's William York wrote a positive review of the album, writing that "for all its variety, this is still a fairly heavy, meat-and-potatoes album with plenty of emotional nuance as well. There are a few spots where Enslaved's ambitions get the better of them, but the experimentation is welcome in any case, and most of it does work. Below the Lights will likely stand out down the road as one of the top black metal releases of 2003." In 2016, About.com named it the best Enslaved album to date, highlighting it for being "everything the band had been slowly building towards was fully realized", fully unleashing the band's potential, and "their crowning achievement."

In 2013, Decibel ranked Below the Lights at number 57 on its list of the Top 100 Black Metal Albums of All Time.

== Track listing ==
No.	Title	Lyrics	Music	Length
1.	"As Fire Swept Clean the Earth"	Peersen / Grutle	Peersen	6:35
2.	"The Dead Stare"	Peersen / Husebø	Peersen	5:37
3.	"The Crossing"	Grutle	Peersen	9:12
4.	"Queen of Night"	Peersen	Peersen	5:59
5.	"Havenless"	Peersen	Peersen	5:35
6.	"Ridicule Swarm"	Husebø	Peersen	6:18
7.	"A Darker Place"	Peersen	Peersen	7:01
Total length:				46:17

"Havenless" contains excerpts from Aksel Sandemose's "Vi pynter oss med horn".

== Personnel ==
=== Enslaved ===
- Grutle Kjellson – bass guitar, vocals
- Arve Isdal – guitar
- Ivar Bjørnson – guitars, keyboards, effectors
- Per Husebø (a.k.a. Dirge Rep) – drums

=== Additional musicians ===
- Gina Torgnes: Flute on "Queen of Night"
- Bjørgvin Tungrock Kor: Choir & Chants on "Havenless"
- Inge Rypdal: Lead Guitar on "A Darker Place"
- Dennis Reksten: Additional Synthesizers & Effects

=== Technical personnel ===
- Arranged By Enslaved
- Produced By Pytten, Jørgen Træen, Ivar Peersen & Grutle Kjellson
- Engineered By Pytten, Herbrand Larsen & Davide Bertolini
- Mixed By Ivar Bjornson, Grutle Kjellson & Jørgen Træen at Duper Studios in Bergen
- Mastered By Nicholas Ramaget, Pierre Dechamps (both at Digipro Studios) & Jørgen Træen (at Duper Studios)
- All Songs Published By Les Editions Hurlantes.
