= Vikingligr Veldi =

Studio album by Enslaved
- Released: 22 February 1994
- Recorded: March–April 1993
- Studio: Grieghallen Studio, Bergen, Norway
- Genre: Viking metal; black metal
- Length: 50:56
- Language: Icelandic, Norwegian
- Label: Deathlike Silence
- Producer: Enslaved; Pytten

Enslaved chronology
Hordanes Land (1993)	Vikingligr Veldi (1994)	Frost (1994)

Vikingligr Veldi (mistaken Old Norse intended to mean roughly Viking-like Dominion or Vikingly Power) is the debut studio album by Norwegian extreme metal band Enslaved. It was released in 1994, through Deathlike Silence Productions, the record label run by Euronymous, who was murdered before the album's release. The album is dedicated to him.

Vikingligr Veldi is an Old Norse concept album with lyrics mainly in Icelandic, with the exception of "Heimdallr" in Old Norwegian. Former Old Funeral bassist Thorlak Sigvaldason helped the band translate the Norwegian lyrics into Icelandic. The album's cover features the Anglo-Saxon helmet uncovered at the Sutton Hoo site in England, widely identified with the 7th-century king Rædwald of East Anglia.

Guitarist and keyboardist Ivar Bjørnson was 15 years old when Vikingligr Veldi was recorded and had co-founded Enslaved with Grutle Kjellson when they were 13 and 17 years old respectively.

== Critical reception ==
Professional ratings
Review scores
Source	Rating
AllMusic	3.5/5 stars

AllMusic wrote, "Vikingligr Veldi [...] proved that [...] Enslaved were ready to carry on the torch of Norwegian black metal beyond the shocking demise of its original ringleader [Euronymous]", calling it "an album that stands the test of time, for the most part, and remains of crucial importance to the black metal genre."

== Track listing ==
All tracks are written by Ivar Bjørnson.

No.	Title	Length
1.	"Lifandi lif undir hamri" ("Living Life Under the Hammer")	11:31
2.	"Vetrarnótt" ("Winternight")	10:58
3.	"Midgards eldar" ("Fires of Midgard")	11:16
4.	"Heimdallr" ("Heimdall")	6:15
5.	"Norvegr" ("Norway")	10:56
Total length:		50:56

== Personnel ==
Enslaved

- Grutle Kjellson – bass guitar, vocals, production, mixing
- Ivar Bjørnson – guitar, keyboards, electronics, piano, production, mixing
- Trym Torson – drums, production, mixing

Production

- Thorlak Sigvaldason – lyric translation
- Pytten (Eirik Hundvin) – production, recording, mixing, engineering
- Davide Bertolini – recording, engineering
- Padden – mixing, drum technician
- Hellhammer – drum technician
