= Vertebrae (album) =

Studio album by Enslaved
- Released: 29 September 2008
- Genres: Progressive black metal, Viking metal
- Length: 49:01
- Labels: Indie, Nuclear Blast
- Producer: Enslaved

Enslaved chronology
Ruun (2006)	Vertebrae (2008)	Axioma Ethica Odini (2010)

Professional ratings
Review scores
Source	Rating
About.com	4.5/5 stars
Allmusic	4/5 stars
Blabbermouth.net	9/10 stars
MetalSucks	4/5 stars

Vertebrae is the tenth studio album by Norwegian extreme metal band Enslaved. It was released on 29 September 2008 by Indie Recordings in Europe and on 28 October 2008 by Nuclear Blast in the US, Enslaved's first album on both labels. It was named as Album of the Year by Terrorizer and was awarded the Norwegian "Spellemannprisen" for best metal album. The album sold approximately 1,100 copies in its first week in the United States, reaching number 49 on the Billboard Top Heatseekers chart.

== Writing and musical style ==
Though Vertebrae's sound is rooted in black metal, AllMusic's Eduardo Rivadavia describes the album's sound as incorporating elements of jazz and art rock, while Blabbermouth wrote that Enslaved incorporate psychedelic influences and "have traveled light-years beyond the chainmail trappings that defined their early attempts at progressive black metal". Rivadavia also notes the "recurring dynamic contrasts between sheer violence and exquisite splendor" of the "multifaceted" and "frequently unpredictable" songs. The lyrics frequently reference Norse imagery and mythology.

Kjellson has said that, "The title symbolizes the building stones in humanity, both physical and mentally, psychologically and biologically. Everything is closely tied together. You can say that the physics are the individual consciousness while the psychics are the outer consciousness. Micro/Macro-cosmos. Explained within mythological terms as the struggle (and also unity) between the Aesir and the giants." The lyrics touch on themes of human potential, as well as human greed, stupidity and hypocrisy. "They describe how extremely fragile we are when it comes to matters such as materialism, religion, propaganda etc. Humans are extremely weak when it comes to individual behaviour, but we yet have a huge potential. This potential is often obscured somehow and the lyrics deals about different aspects of these matters, mine being the metaphorical/mythological while Ivar's the Psycho-surreal ones."

== Artwork ==
According to Kjellson, "On the cover you see the Vertebrae in the center, symbolizing the physical building stone. It stands alone to indicate both pride and that it is yet fragile. The blood veins that form the rune symbol (Mannar/Mannaz/Man) can be seen as the unity between mind and flesh."

== Critical reception ==
Vertebrae received positive reviews from critics upon release. Writing for AllMusic, Eduardo Rivadavia wrote that "Enslaved continue to represent the absolute evolutionary cutting edge of extreme metal, delivering in Vertebrae yet another spectacle of imagination and quality control, matched only by Sweden's equally consistent Opeth." He praised the band's extensive range of influences as well as their complex songwriting. Blabbermouth also praised the diversity and creativity of the album, writing that, "The best thing about Enslaved is that they expanded their sound without discarding anything from their past – black metal, their mid-period doomy vibe, the prog-rock spaciness of the last couple records, all mashed together in an improbable cohesion." They concluded by writing, "It's all in here, it all works, and while it just about defies description, it's the band's most compelling work to date and it's a must-have for any adventurous fan, metal or otherwise."

== Track listing ==
All music is composed by Ivar Bjørnson.

No.	Title	Lyrics	Length
1.	"Clouds"	Kjellson	6:09
2.	"To the Coast"	Bjørnson	6:27
3.	"Ground"	Bjørnson	6:38
4.	"Vertebrae"	Kjellson	5:01
5.	"New Dawn"	Bjørnson	5:23
6.	"Reflection"	Kjellson	7:45
7.	"Center"	Bjørnson	7:33
8.	"The Watcher"	Kjellson	4:11
Total length:			49:01

== Personnel ==
Personnel adapted from AllMusic.

- Grutle Kjellson – bass guitar, vocals, art direction
- Ivar Bjørnson – lead and rhythm guitars, art direction, engineering
- Arve Isdal – lead and rhythm guitars
- Herbrand Larsen – keyboards, synthesizers, vocals, engineering
- Cato Bekkevold – drums, percussion
- Ronnie Le Tekrø – lead guitar on "Clouds"
- George Marino – mastering
- Joe Barresi – mixing
- Truls Espedal – artwork
