= Grutle Kjellson =

Norwegian musician

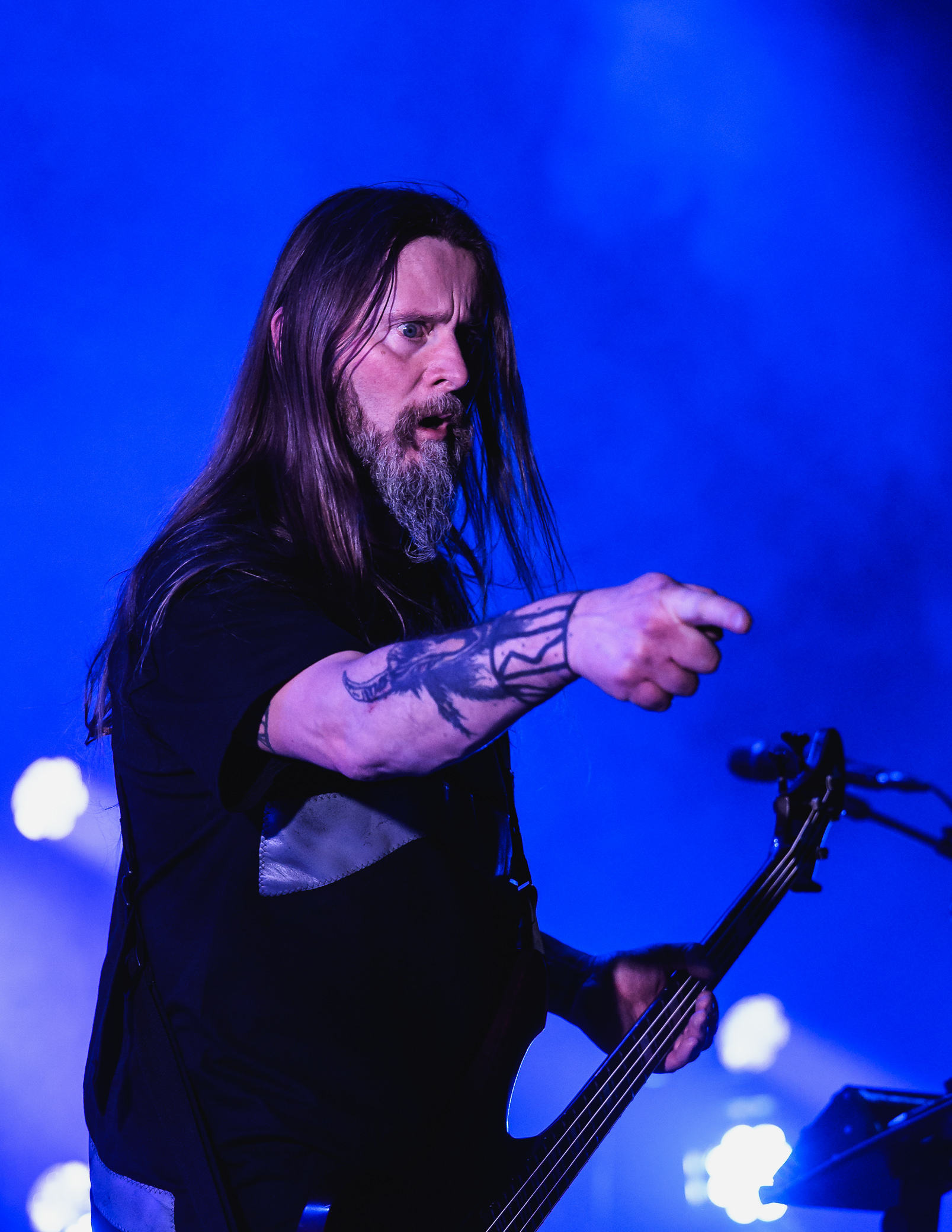
- Kjellson with Enslaved in 2026

Background information
- Born: Kjetil Tvedte Grutle; 24 December 1973 (age 52)
- Origin: Sveio, Norway
- Genres: Viking metal; black metal; progressive metal
- Occupations: Musician; songwriter
- Instruments: Vocals; bass guitar
- Years active: 1989–present
- Member of: Enslaved; Trinacria
- Formerly of: Phobia; Desekrator
- Website: enslaved.no

Kjetil Tvedte Grutle (born December 24, 1973), better known as Grutle Kjellson, is a Norwegian musician, best known as the bassist and vocalist of the extreme metal band Enslaved. Kjellson and guitarist Ivar Bjørnson are the founding and only constant members of the band, as well as the main songwriters. He has released sixteen studio albums with Enslaved and won five Norwegian Spellemann Awards with the band.

== Biography ==
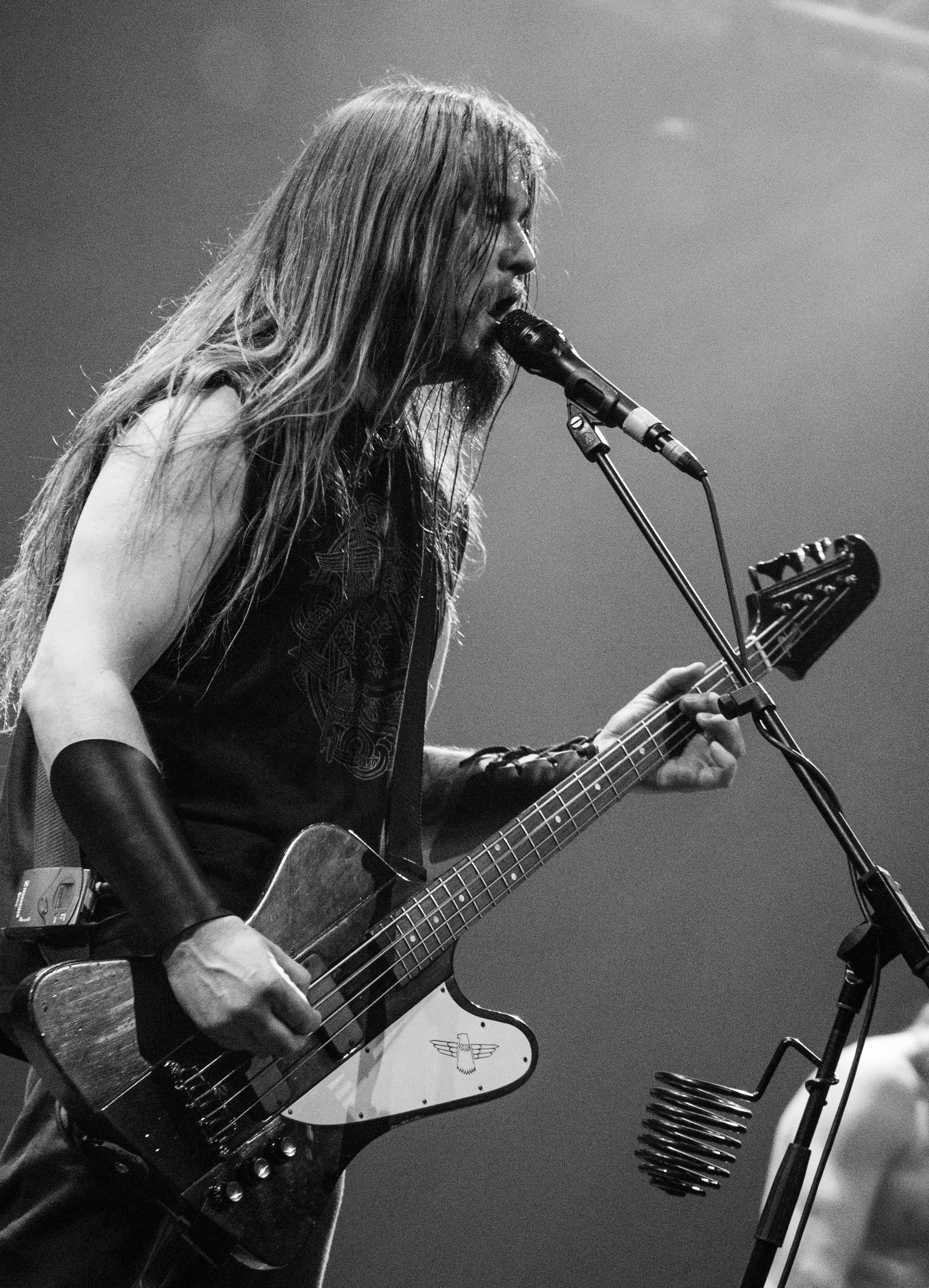
Kjellson with Enslaved in 2015

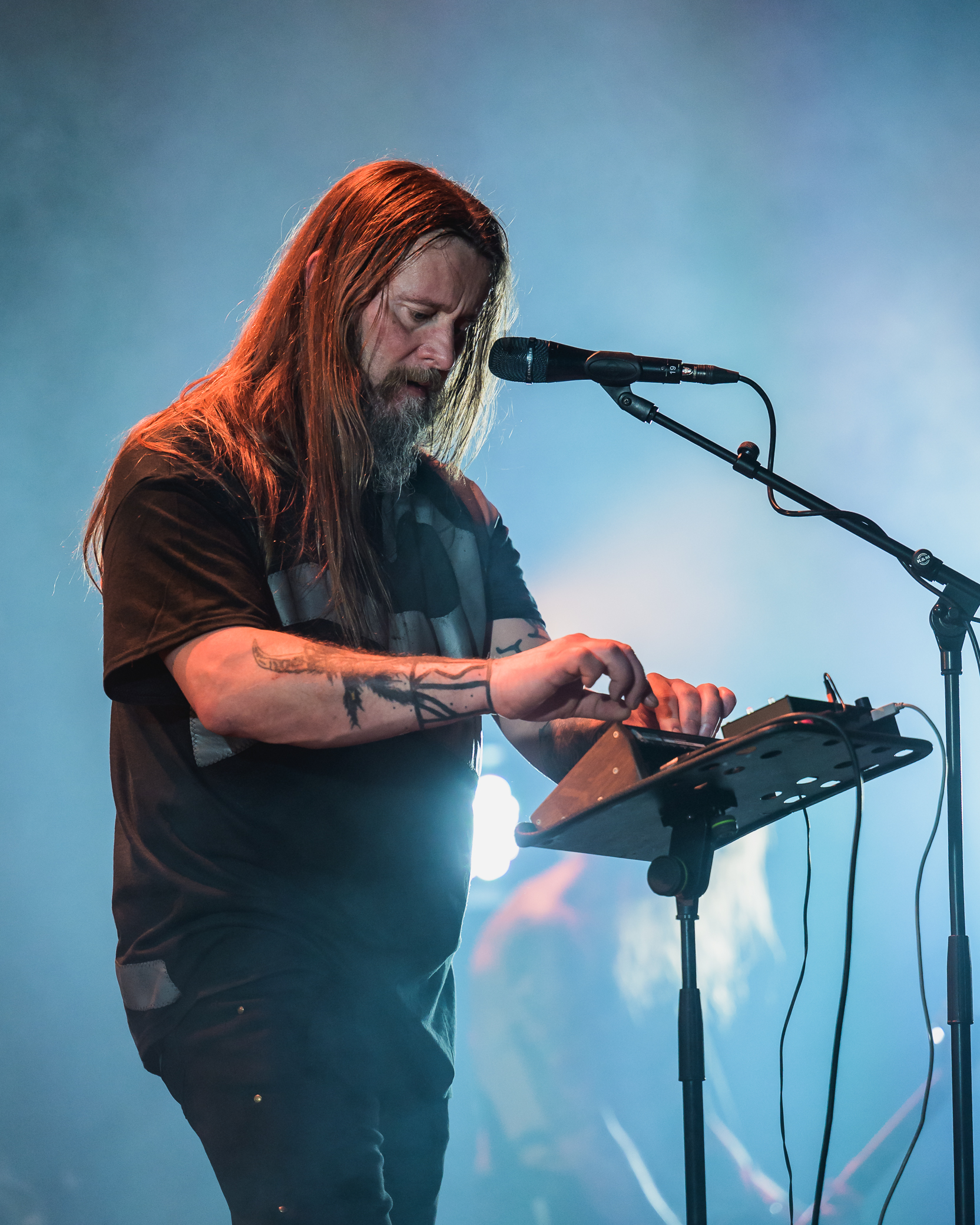
Kjellson with Enslaved at Inferno Metal Festival 2026

In 1990, 16-year-old Kjellson met the 12-year-old guitarist of death metal band Obnoxious, Ivar Bjørnson, during a rehearsal with his own band Phobia in Haugesund. Bjørnson was invited to join Phobia, which later split up in early 1991. In May 1991, Kjellson and Bjørnson founded a new band inspired by Norse mythology called Enslaved together with drummer Trym Torson, a former bandmate of Bjørnson from Obnoxious. Kjellson and Bjørnson are the only permanent members of Enslaved since its inception to date.

In 1996, Kjellson and Bjørnson together with Infernus and Tormentor of Gorgoroth created the short-lived thrash metal band Desekrator, which disbanded in 1999. In 2005, Kjellson along with Bjørnson, Enslaved bandmate Arve Isdal and other musicians formed the band Trinacria. He was a guest performer on the song "High on Cold War" from Darkthrone's 2006 EP, Too Old, Too Cold.

In 2009, Kjellson contributed along with Enslaved colleagues Isdal and Herbrand Larsen, and American actress Laraine Newman, in the animated television series Metalocalypse as one of "The Klokateers". He has also appeared in interviews for the documentaries Showman (2010) and Metal Evolution (2014).

== Views on religion ==
Kjellson is known to be anti-Christian and non-religious. Despite Enslaved's place in the extreme metal and black metal genres, the band has never had Satanical views or lyrics. Kjellson has stated in multiple interviews his opinion on the 1990s church burnings in Norway, mentioning in the documentary film Metal: A Headbanger's Journey that:

Well in a way, I think that Christianity in Norway deserved it, you know? In the beginning, it was not something the Norwegians chose. It was forced upon them. So you can say that "That's a thousand years ago", but — I wasn't sad, I wasn't really happy either — but I mean, in a historical point of view Christianity deserved it.

== Discography ==
=== With Enslaved ===
- Vikingligr Veldi (1994)
- Frost (1994)
- Eld (1997)
- Blodhemn (1998)
- Mardraum – Beyond the Within (2000)
- Monumension (2001)
- Below the Lights (2003)
- Isa (2004)
- Ruun (2006)
- Vertebrae (2008)
- Axioma Ethica Odini (2010)
- RIITIIR (2012)
- In Times (2015)
- E (2017)
- Utgard (2020)
- Heimdal (2023)
- Mið (2026)

=== With Trinacria ===
- Travel Now Journey Infinitely (2008)

=== Writing, vocal and instrumental contributions ===
Year	Artist	Title	Song(s)	Notes
1995	Enslaved	Nordic Metal: A Tribute to Euronymous	"Loke"	
1996	Enslaved	In Memory of Celtic Frost	"Procreation (Of the Wicked)"	
2003	V:28	NonAnthropogenic	"Dead Shining Star", "Purity"	Vocals
2005	Manngard	Circling Buzzards	"Gravgang"	Vocals
2006	Darkthrone	Too Old, Too Cold	"High on Cold War"	Vocals
2007	Syrach	Days of Wrath		Additional vocals
2010	Shining	Blackjazz	"Omen", "21st Century Schizoid Man"	Vocals
2011	Nine Covens	On the Coming of Darkness	"Pt. 2: A New Light for the Earth Shall Shine"	Vocals
2013	Vardlokk	Skraelingjahlaut		Lyrics, vocals, theremin
2014	Doomicus	Doomicus	"Boozehound"	Vocals
2015	Rise of Avernus	Dramatis Personæ	"Acta Est Fabula"	Vocals
2016	Ivar Bjørnson & Einar Selvik	Skuggsjá		Vocals
2017	Stromstad	New Devoted Human	"Reluctant Traveller"	Vocals
2021	Ivar Bjørnson & Einar Selvik	–	"Hardanger"	Writer, lyrics, performer, voice
