= Isa (Enslaved album) =

Studio album by Enslaved
- Released: 20 October 2004 (Norway); 8 November 2004 (Europe); 7 February 2005 (US)
- Recorded: July–August 2004, Grieghallen Studios, Bergen, Norway
- Genre: Progressive black metal; Viking metal; post-black metal
- Length: 51:01
- Label: Candlelight
- Producer: Enslaved; Pytten

Enslaved chronology
Below the Lights (2003)	Isa (2004)	Ruun (2006)

Professional ratings
Review scores
Source	Rating
Allmusic	4.5/5 stars
Blabbermouth	9/10 stars

Isa is the eighth studio album by Norwegian extreme metal band Enslaved. It was released on 20 October 2004 in Norway and 8 November 2004 in Europe by Tabu Recordings and on 7 February 2005 in the US by Candlelight Records. Several tracks segue continuously into one another and the majority of compositions are composed of multiple interlocking movements.

== Track listing ==
All tracks are written by Ivar Bjørnson, except where noted.

No.	Title	Lyrics	Length
1.	"Intro: Green Reflection"		0:51
2.	"Lunar Force"	Grutle Kjellson	7:03
3.	"Isa"		3:46
4.	"Ascension"		6:45
5.	"Bounded by Allegiance"	Kjellson	6:38
6.	"Violet Dawning"		3:49
7.	"Return to Yggdrasill"	Bjørnson; Kjellson	5:39
8.	"Secrets of the Flesh"		3:36
9.	"Neogenesis"		11:58
10.	"Outro: Communion (excerpt)"		0:56
Total length:			51:01

== Personnel ==
=== Enslaved ===
- Grutle Kjellson – harsh vocals, bass
- Ivar Bjørnson – guitar
- Arve Isdal – guitar
- Herbrand Larsen – keyboards; hammond, piano, mellotron, clean vocals
- Cato Bekkevold (from Red Harvest) – drums, percussion

=== Additional personnel ===
- Truls Espedal, Asle Birkeland – cover art
- Abbath Doom Occulta – backing vocals – "Lunar Force"
- Nocturno Culto – additional vocals – "Isa" and "Bounded by Allegiance"
- Dennis Reksten (from El-Regn) – additional synthesizers
- Ofu Khan (from Red Harvest) – vocals on "Ascension"
- Stig Sandbakk – additional vocals on "Ascension" and "Return to Yggdrasill"

=== Production ===
- Production: Pytten and Enslaved
- Engineering: Pytten and Herbrand Larsen
- Mixing: Lars Klokkerhaug
- Mastering: Peter In de Betou
