= Monumension =

Studio album by Enslaved
- Released: 19 November 2001
- Recorded: 2001
- Genre: Black metal; Viking metal; progressive metal
- Length: 52:38
- Label: Osmose
- Producer: Enslaved, Pytten

Enslaved chronology
Mardraum - Beyond the Within (2000)	Monumension (2001)	Below the Lights (2003)

Monumension is the sixth studio album by Norwegian extreme metal band Enslaved. It was released on 19 November 2001, through Osmose Productions. It is Enslaved's first album to feature lyrics sung entirely in English, although some versions of the album include the Old Norse track "Sigmundskvadet" as a bonus.

Monumension was the last Enslaved album to feature guitarist R. Kronheim; Arve Isdal would replace him on Below the Lights.

== Track listing ==
All tracks are written by Ivar Bjørnson, except as noted.

No.	Title	Writer(s)	Length
1.	"Convoys to Nothingness"		7:58
2.	"The Voices"		6:07
3.	"Vision: Sphere of the Elements – A Monument Part II"	Roy Kronheim	4:58
4.	"Hollow Inside"	Bjørnson, Trygve Mathiesen	5:38
5.	"The Cromlech Gate"	Grutle Kjellson	6:55
6.	"Enemy I"		5:16
7.	"Smirr"		4:26
8.	"The Sleep: Floating Diversity – A Monument Part III"	Kronheim	8:12
9.	"Outro: Self-Zero"		3:08
Total length:			52:38

Bonus track
No.	Title	Length
10.	"Sigmundskvadet"	6:59
Total length:		59:37

== Critical reception ==
Professional ratings
Review scores
Source	Rating
AllMusic	3.5/5 stars
Chronicles of Chaos	7.5/10

Monumension has been generally well received.

AllMusic praised the album, calling it "astounding" and "truly daring". Chronicles of Chaos's review was generally favorable, though writing, "Monumension occasionally comes across as too over-the-top in terms of its experimentation, and the album as a whole lacks some focus and consistency."

== Personnel ==
Enslaved

- Ivar Bjørnson – guitar, synthesizers, organ, piano, special effects, choir vocals on "Sigmundskvadet", production, mixing
- Christian Kronheim – guitar, vocals, special effects, choir vocals on "Sigmundskvadet", production, mixing
- Grutle Kjellson – bass guitar, vocals, choir vocals on "Sigmundskvadet", production, mixing
- Dirge Rep (Per Husebø) – drums, percussion, special effects, choir vocals on "Sigmundskvadet", production, mixing

Additional personnel

- Dennis Reksten – minimoog synthesizers, keyboards, vocoder, special effects
- Trygve Mathiesen – lead vocals on "Hollow Inside" and "Sigmundskvadet"
- Trond Veland – backing vocals on "Vision: Sphere of the Elements – A Monument Part II"
- Kai Lie – additional choir vocals on "Sigmundskvadet"

== Production ==
- Pytten (Eirik Hundvin) – production, recording, engineering
- Davide Bertolini – recording, engineering
- Herbrand Larsen – recording, engineering
- Jørgen Træen – mixing
