= Ruun =

Studio album by Enslaved
- Released: 2 May 2006
- Recorded: January 2006
- Genre: Progressive black metal, Viking metal
- Length: 46:03
- Label: Candlelight
- Producer: Enslaved

Enslaved chronology
Isa (2004)	Ruun (2006)	Vertebrae (2008)

Professional ratings
Review scores
Source	Rating
AllMusic	4/5 stars
PopMatters	8/10
Stylus	A−
Terrorizer	9/10

Ruun is the ninth studio album by Norwegian extreme metal band Enslaved. It was released on 2 May 2006 in the US, 8 May 2006 in Norway and 22 May 2006 in Europe. It was given Norway's 2006 Spellemann award for best achievement in the "metal" genre.

== Track listing ==
No.	Title	Length
1.	"Entroper"	6:21
2.	"Path to Vanir"	4:25
3.	"Fusion of Sense and Earth"	5:00
4.	"Ruun"	6:49
5.	"Tides of Chaos"	5:16
6.	"Essence"	6:18
7.	"Api-vat"	6:57
8.	"Heir to the Cosmic Seed"	4:55
Total length:		46:03

== Personnel ==
- Grutle Kjellson - bass guitar, vocals
- Ivar Bjørnson - guitar, effects
- Arve Isdal - guitar
- Herbrand Larsen - keyboards, vocals
- Cato Bekkevold - drums, percussion

== Production ==
- Produced by Enslaved
- Engineered and recorded by Johnny Skallberg
- Vocals recorded by Herbrand Larsen
- Additional keyboards and effects recorded by I. Peersen
- Mixed by Mike Hartung
- Mastered by Bjorn Engeman
