= Utgard (album) =

Studio album by Enslaved
- Released: 2 October 2020
- Recorded: 2019
- Genres: Progressive metal; extreme metal
- Length: 44:46
- Label: Nuclear Blast
- Producers: Iver Sandøy, Ivar Bjørnson, Grutle Kjellson

Enslaved chronology
E (2017)	Utgard (2020)	Caravans to the Outer Worlds (2021)

Utgard is the fifteenth studio album by Norwegian extreme metal band Enslaved, released 2 October 2020 by Nuclear Blast.

== Background ==
Utgard is the first Enslaved studio album to feature drummer Iver Sandøy, who joined the band during the touring cycle for their previous album E, following the departure of longtime drummer Cato Bekkevold. Sandøy, who had previously co-produced several of the band's releases, also contributes clean vocals on the album. Utgard was originally scheduled for release in early 2020, but was delayed until October of that year due to the COVID-19 pandemic.

The album is titled after a location in Norse mythology and includes some Norse lyrics and song titles. A video, filmed in Iceland, was released for the song "Jettegryta". Utgard continues to display some of the band's early black metal roots while continuing their experimentation with 1970s progressive rock.

== Critical reception ==
The album received mostly positive reviews upon its release. Kerrang! noted that "Enslaved take the listener through a frightening landscape in Norse mythology where the gods have no control and chaos reigns" and called the band "masters" and "elder statesmen" of progressive black metal. Blabbermouth noted that the album "feels like the true culmination of Enslaved's ascendancy to the throne of modern prog-metal wizardry." The Prog division of Loudersound concluded that Utgard is the ultimate result of musical experiments that the band had been conducting over their past several albums. In the words of Antihero, "Enslaved deliver their elite brand of Prog/Extreme Metal that they have so meticulously hammered out over the past three decades." Metal Hammer named it as the 9th best metal album of 2020.

== Track listing ==
All tracks are written by Ivar Bjørnson (under the name I. Peersen); except tracks 1, 4, 6, 7 with lyrics by Grutle Kjellson (under the name K. Grutle).

No.	Title	Length
1.	"Fires in the Dark"	6:00
2.	"Jettegryta"	4:56
3.	"Sequence"	6:39
4.	"Homebound"	5:30
5.	"Útgarðr"	1:51
6.	"Urjotun"	4:21
7.	"Flight of Thought and Memory"	6:22
8.	"Storms of Utgard"	4:38
9.	"Distant Seasons"	4:31
Total length:		44:46

== Personnel ==
- Ivar Bjørnson – electric guitars, acoustic guitars, synthesizers, keyboards, sequencer, FX, backing vocals (track 1)
- Grutle Kjellson – vocals, bass, synthesizer
- Iver Sandøy – vocals, drums, percussion, keyboards, FX
- Håkon Vinje – keyboards, piano, vocals
- Arve Isdal – electric guitars, acoustic guitars, backing vocals (track 1)

Additional personnel:

- Martin "Bellhammer" Horntveth – percussion, synthesizers, glockenspiel, tubular bells, rototoms, programming (track 3)
- Inger Sunneva Peersen, Sonja Elisabeth Peersen – backing vocals (track 9)

== Charts ==
Chart performance for Utgard
Chart (2020)	Peak position
Austrian Albums (Ö3 Austria)	59
Belgian Albums (Ultratop Flanders)	162
Belgian Albums (Ultratop Wallonia)	59
Finnish Albums (Suomen virallinen lista)	42
German Albums (Offizielle Top 100)	30
Scottish Albums (Official Charts)	48
