= Enslaved (band) =

Norwegian extreme metal band

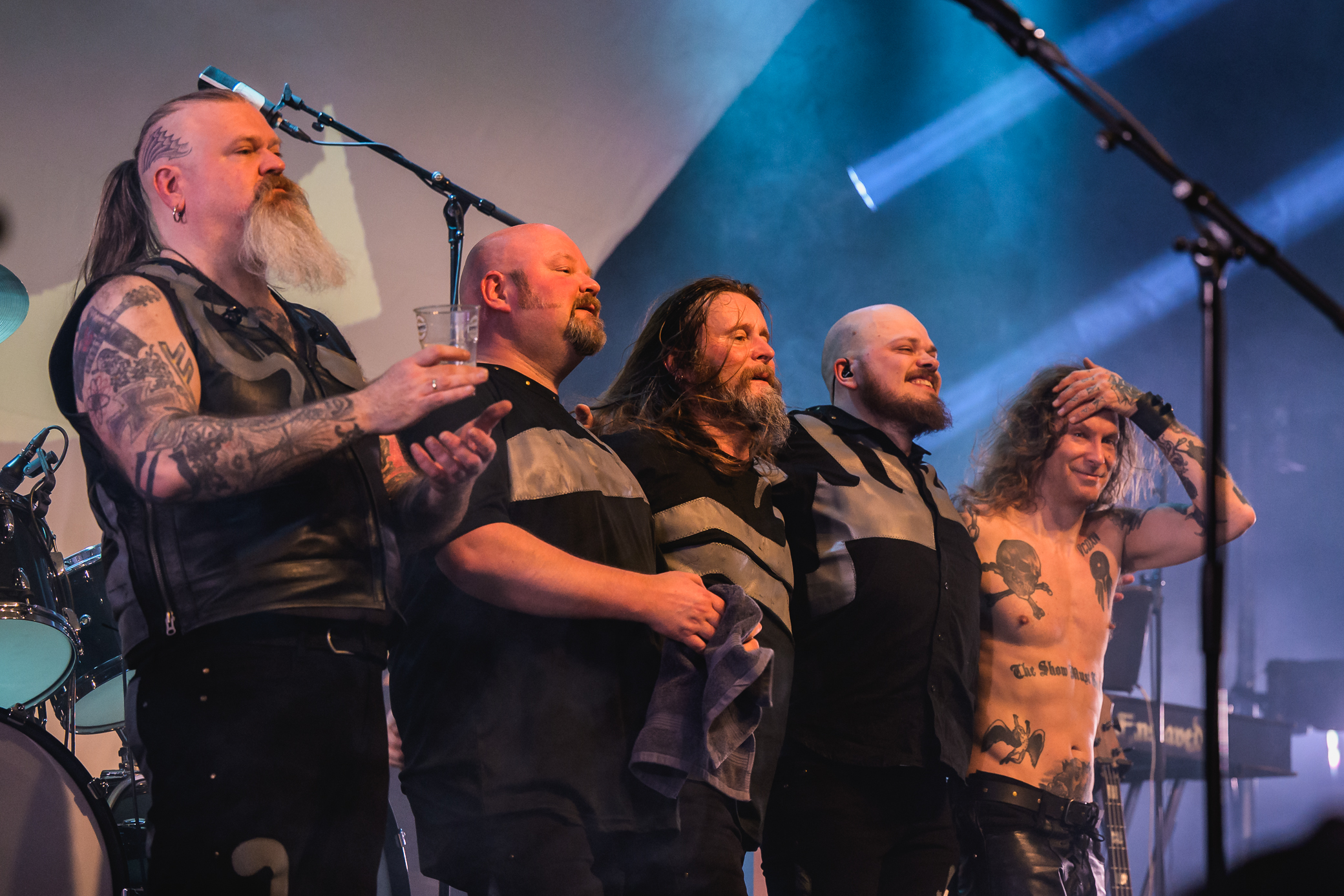
- Enslaved in 2026 (L-R: Ivar Bjørnson, Iver Sandøy, Grutle Kjellson, Håkon Vinje, Arve Isdal)

Background information
- Origin: Haugesund, Norway
- Genres: Progressive metal; Viking metal; black metal
- Years active: 1991–present
- Labels: Deathlike Silence, Voices of Wonder, SPV, Osmose, Tabu, Relapse, The End, Candlelight, Nuclear Blast
- Members: Ivar Bjørnson; Grutle Kjellson; Arve Isdal; Håkon Vinje; Iver Sandøy
- Past members: Trym Torson; Harald Helgeson; Per Håvarstein; Christian Kronheim; Herbrand Larsen; Cato Bekkevold

Enslaved is a Norwegian extreme metal band formed by Ivar Bjørnson and Grutle Kjellson in Haugesund in 1991. They are currently based in Bergen. The band's lineup has changed many times. Bjørnson and Kjellson are the sole constant members. The current lineup also includes lead guitarist Arve Isdal, keyboardist/singer Håkon Vinje, and drummer Iver Sandøy.

The band draws on Norwegian Viking cultural and religious heritage for inspiration. Most lyrics relate to Norse mythology. Though they began as a traditional black metal band, their sound has changed over time, resulting in a progressive sound. In 2014, the Norwegian government commissioned members of Enslaved to create a piece celebrating the 200th anniversary of the Norwegian constitution. This was later released as the studio album Skuggsjá (lit: Shadow watch) in 2016. The band has released seventeen full-length studio albums. The most recent, Mið, was released in October 2026.

== History ==
=== Formation and early history (1991–2007) ===
Enslaved was formed in 1991 by Ivar Bjørnson and Grutle Kjellson (also known as Kjetil Grutle) when they were teenagers. The name was inspired by the Immortal demo track "Enslaved in Rot." Prior to Enslaved, Bjørnson and Kjellson played death metal band Phobia. Like many in the extreme metal movement, they looked for new sources of inspiration and expression. Though Enslaved began as a prototypical Norwegian black metal band in 1991, by 1993 they incorporated song structures unusual for the genre. Several early songs are ten minutes long (their debut album, Vikingligr Veldi, has only one song under ten minutes). The band rejected the black metal label and preferred "extreme metal". After several line-up changes early on, Bjørnson and Kjellson remained the only original founding members. By 2004, the line-up was solidified with guitarist Arve "Ice Dale" Isdal, drummer Cato Bekkevold, and keyboardist/vocalist Herbrand Larsen. The albums Isa (2004) and Ruun (2006) departed from their previous sound, including sharp dynamic shifts. Bjørnson considers the former a turning point. Following Ruun, Bjørnson, Kjellson, and Isdal collaborated with Norwegian noise duo Fe-Mail under the name Trinacria in 2007. Enslaved played at Wacken Open Air in August of that year.

=== International recognition (2008–2015) ===
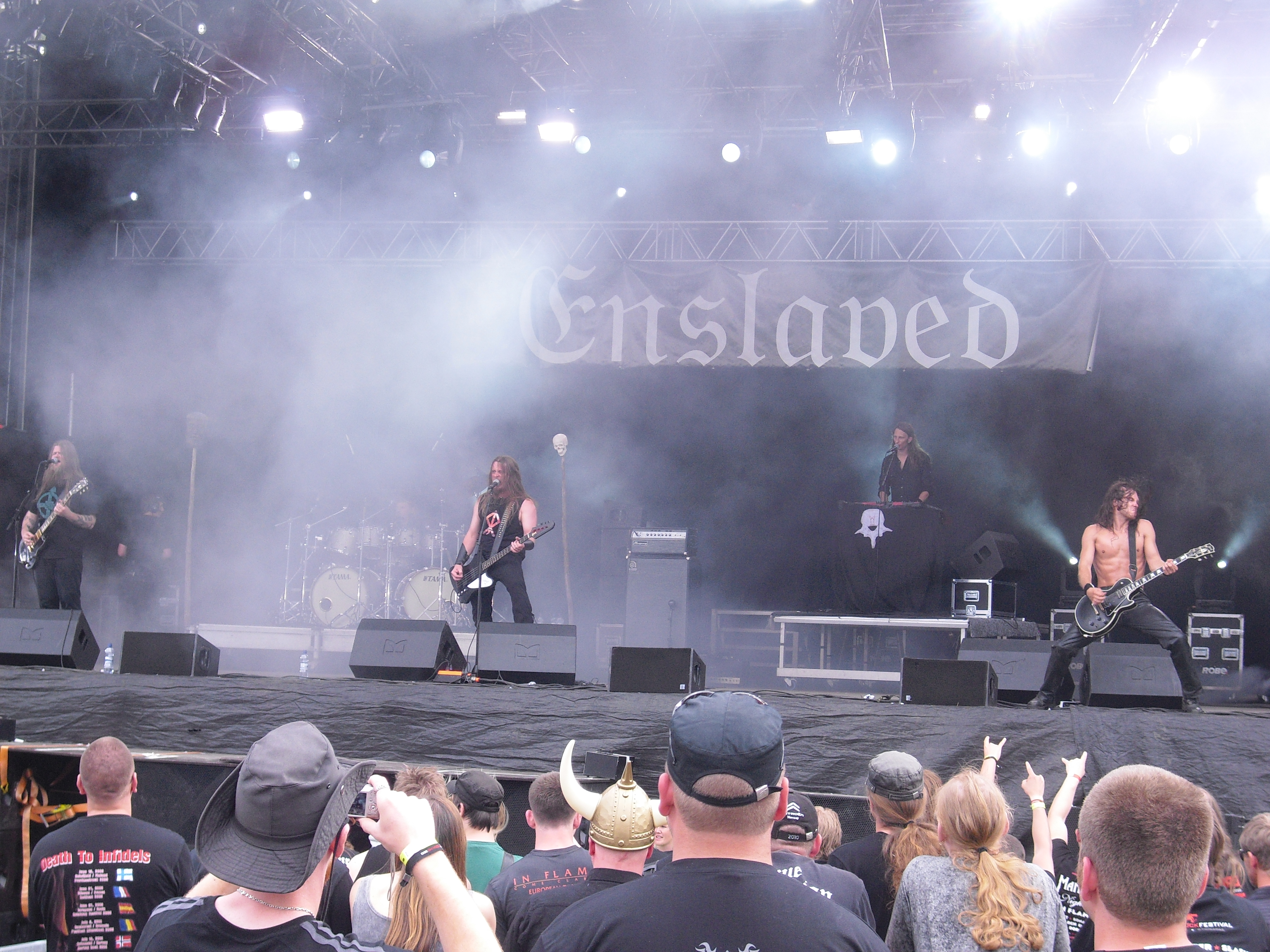
Enslaved performing in 2010

Enslaved released Vertebrae in September 2008, their tenth studio album and first on Nuclear Blast. Terrorizer magazine named it the album of the year in 2008, above Meshuggah's obZen and Opeth's Watershed. After touring Europe extensively, Enslaved embarked on a North American tour with progressive death metal band Opeth in May 2009. The album is noted for its shift in its approach and its diverse sounds. Sammy O'Hagar from MetalSucks.net said that "to call [Vertebrae] black metal would be quite a stretch" because "there's an impressive depth to [it] that surpasses the sour misanthropy so often (and rightfully) associated with the genre", and furthermore described their sound as "heavy and surprisingly soft, focused and curious, true to their roots and longing to forget them". The album's sound has compared to Pink Floyd, as well as other black metal releases in a similar vein.

The band's eleventh studio album, Axioma Ethica Odini, was released on 27 September 2010 in Europe and the following day in North America. In 2011, Enslaved released two new EPs. The first EP, entitled The Sleeping Gods, which was produced in partnership with Scion Audio/Visual, was released on 10 May 2011 and made available as a free download consisting of 5 original tracks. The second EP, entitled Thorn, was released on 27 August 2011 in partnership with Soulseller Records in fulfillment of a decade-old agreement. The Thorn EP, released on seven-inch vinyl, was strictly limited to 1,000 copies and featured a more atmospheric sound than the band is currently known for. Enslaved started their 20th anniversary tour "Circling Above and Within North America Tour Part IV" in September 2011 with Alcest and Junius in the United States and Canada. An official tribute album called Önd – A Tribute was released on Pictonian Records in July 2012. It contains covers from twenty bands (including Dordeduh, Fen, Kraków, Vreid and Wodensthrone) to celebrate the two first decades of Enslaved's career.

After having signed to Nuclear Blast in Europe, Enslaved released their 12th studio album, RIITIIR, on 28 September 2012 in Europe and 9 October in North America. The album received positive reviews from music critics. In 2013, they contributed to the book Tenk som en rockestjerne (Think Like a Rockstar), written by Ståle Økland. Enslaved released their 13th full-length studio album, In Times, on 10 March 2015 through Nuclear Blast. The album received positive reviews from music critics, with AllMusic's Thom Jurek noting that the band are "still pushing at the boundaries of the music that inspired them back in 1991 when guitarist Ivar Bjørnson and vocalist/bassist Grutle Kjellson (13 and 17 years old at the time) first formed the band."

=== Recent history (2016–present) ===
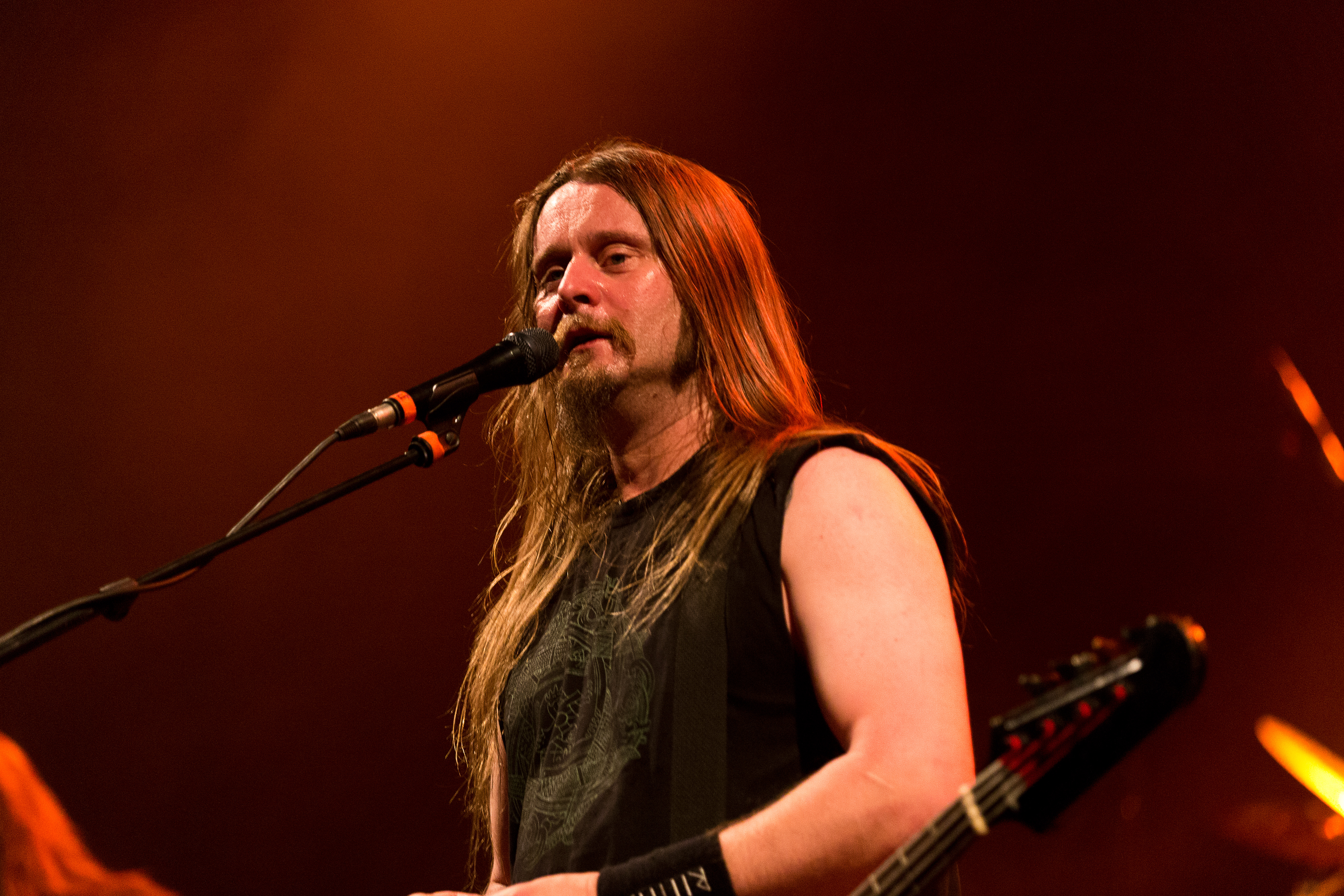
Singer Grutle Kjellson at the Wave-Gotik-Treffen 2016 in Germany

In 2016, the band celebrated their 25th anniversary with a series of exclusive shows and merchandise designs. Their Spinning Wheel Ritual tour across Europe with Ne Obliviscaris and Oceans of Slumber will take place from late September to early November. They also announced their plans to release a new compilation album on 11 November 2016, titled The Sleeping Gods – Thorn. The album compiles rare and experimental material from 2010 to 2011 which were previously available as two separate EPs released in 2011: The Sleeping Gods and Thorn.

In December 2016, keyboardist Herbrand Larsen left the band amicably after 12 years. The band then recruited Håkon Vinje of Seven Impale, a Norwegian band that previously opened for them at a concert in Bergen.

In May 2017, Enslaved released their first live album, Roadburn Live, recorded during their performance at Roadburn Festival in 2015. Enslaved's 14th studio album E was released on 13 October 2017. In June 2018, drummer Cato Bekkevold retired from the band amicably, and was replaced by Iver Sandøy, who had previously played in Bjørnson, Kjellson and Isdal's side project Trinacria and co-produced several recent Enslaved albums.

The band's 15th album Utgard was initially announced for spring 2020, but was delayed due to the COVID-19 pandemic until October 2020. The four-song EP Caravans to the Outer Worlds was released in October 2021; the EP was described by the band as a bridge between Utgard and their next full-length album in the future. Their sixteenth studio album Heimdal was released on March 3, 2023. Later that spring, the band toured with Insomnium and Black Anvil, and they performed at the Hell's Heroes music festival in Houston in March 2026.

Their seventeenth studio album, Mið, was released in October 2026.

== Musical style and influences ==
The band's early music was rooted in traditional black metal and Viking metal, however the band moved away from this sound with 2001's Monumension and 2003's Below the Lights. It was at this point that the band was reduced to its two founding members, Bjørnson and Kjellson. They began to incorporate elements of progressive rock, jazz, and other distinct influences into their sound, and over time have continued this progression. Jillian Drachman of Loudwire said: "Ideologically, Enslaved have always walked a path distinct from black metal, though they were one of the key acts responsible for laying down the blueprint for the genre." The band's music frequently incorporates clean vocals. The band's music also has elements of folk and krautrock. Their lyrics explore topics such as Norse gods.

Kjellson has named Pink Floyd, King Crimson, Rush, Genesis, Darkthrone, early Mayhem, and Bathory as important influences on the band's sound.

== Band members ==
Current

- Grutle Kjellson – unclean vocals, bass, occasional synthesizer (1991–present)
- Ivar Bjørnson – guitar, synthesizer, backing vocals (1991–present), keyboards, occasional clean vocals (1991–2004)
- Arve "Ice Dale" Isdal – guitar (2002–present)
- Håkon Vinje – keyboards, clean vocals (2017–present)
- Iver Sandøy – drums, clean vocals, keyboards (2018–present)

Former

- Trym Torson – drums, percussion (1991–1995)
- Harald Helgeson – drums (1995–1997)
- Dirge Rep (Per Arild Håvarstein Husebø) – drums, percussion (1997–2003)
- Christian "Roy" Kronheim – guitar (1997–2001)
- Herbrand Larsen – keyboards, synthesizer, clean and backing vocals, live guitar (2004–2016)
- Cato Bekkevold – drums, percussion (2003–2018)

Former session musicians

- Inge Joakim Ripdal – additional guitars, effects, backing vocals

Timeline

== Discography ==
Studio albums

- Vikingligr Veldi (1994)
- Frost (1994)
- Eld (1997)
- Blodhemn (1998)
- Mardraum – Beyond the Within (2000)
- Monumension (2001)
- Below the Lights (2003)
- Isa (2004)
- Ruun (2006)
- Vertebrae (2008)
- Axioma Ethica Odini (2010)
- RIITIIR (2012)
- In Times (2015)
- E (2017)
- Utgard (2020)
- Heimdal (2023)
- Mið (2026)
