= Ivar Bjørnson =

Norwegian guitarist

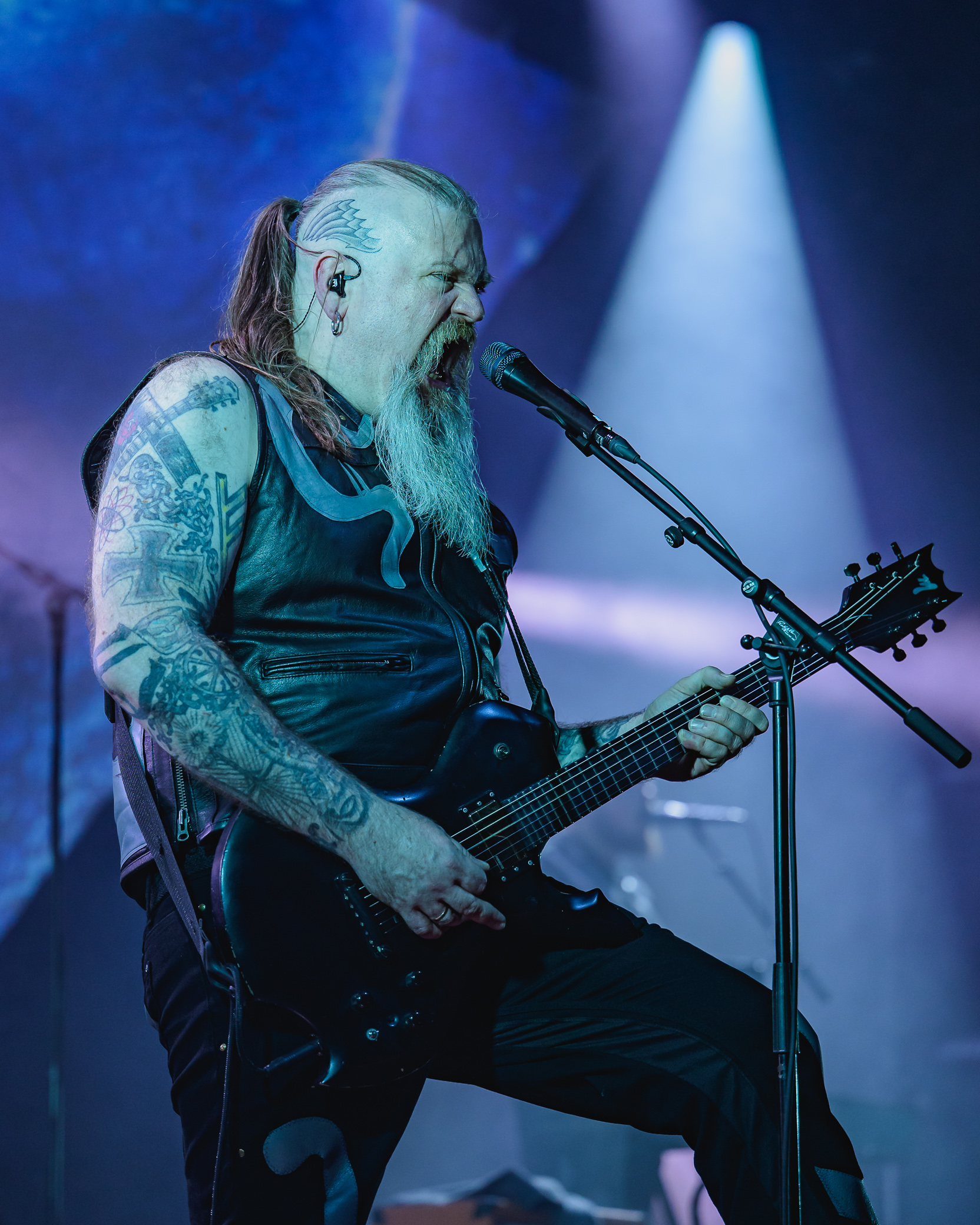
- Bjørnson performing in 2026

Background information
- Also known as: Daimonion
- Born: Ivar Skontorp Peersen; 27 November 1977 (age 48)
- Origin: Etne Municipality, Norway
- Genres: Viking metal; black metal; progressive metal; ambient
- Occupation: Musician
- Instruments: Guitar, bass, drums, keyboards, synthesizer
- Years active: 1989–present
- Member of: Enslaved; BardSpec
- Formerly of: Borknagar; Trinacria; Phobia

Ivar Skontorp Peersen (born 27 November 1977), best known by his stage name Ivar Bjørnson, is a Norwegian musician. He is a founding member and the main songwriter of the extreme metal band Enslaved, and has previously been a member of the metal band Borknagar and collaborated with Einar Selvik on several albums. He has released sixteen studio albums with Enslaved and won five Norwegian Spellemann Awards with the band.

== Biography ==
Bjørnson was born in Etne Municipality. He is, along with Grutle Kjellson, one of only two founding members left in the current line-up of Enslaved, having been only 13 years old at the time of the band's formation in 1991. Bjørnson and Kjellson had previously performed together in a death metal band called Phobia from 1990 to 1991. After Phobia's split, the two formed Enslaved as a band more in the vein of the black metal style and with their shared fascination with Norse mythology as a foundation. In addition to his duties on guitar, Bjørnson writes almost all of the music for Enslaved, as well as much of the lyrics. He stated that "When we started Enslaved we wanted to have the same level of commitment to something spiritual as our contemporaries in black metal [have with] the Satanic side. The dark destructive part of black metal didn't seem right because we didn't have any commitment to any Satanic ideology." Bjørnson contributed keyboards and synths to Borknagar's first three albums, and synths on the Gorgoroth albums Destroyer and Incipit Satan under the name Daimonion, in addition to co-writing the song "Will To Power" on the latter album. He also produced the black metal band Orcustus' first demo.

In 2011, Metalsucks named Bjørnson the 22nd best modern metal guitarist, writing that "Ivar Bjørnson pushed the boundaries of black metal so far that they’re in the blurry distance, only recognizable to those looking for them." He has frequently cited Pink Floyd, Motorpsycho, and progressive rock as major influences on his songwriting, and has called Pink Floyd his favourite band.

In 2014, the Norwegian government commissioned Bjørnson and Einar Selvik of Wardruna to create a musical piece in celebration of the 200th anniversary of the Norwegian constitution. The arrangement was titled 'Skuggsjá', and was performed by Enslaved and Wardruna as a concert piece at the Eidsivablot festival in Eidsvoll, Norway, on 13 September 2014. The music drew on the history, culture, and language of Norway and its Norse tradition, intended to tell the story of Norway, and to contextualise the past in Norway's present. The pair later decided that the project should be expanded upon, and further shows followed, including one at the popular Roadburn festival in 2015. They used the project's name and released the project as a full-length studio album on 11 March 2016. In 2017, Bjørnson released the album Hydrogen under the ambient project BardSpec.

== Discography ==
=== With Enslaved ===
- Vikingligr Veldi (1994)
- Frost (1994)
- Eld (1997)
- Blodhemn (1998)
- Mardraum – Beyond the Within (2000)
- Monumension (2001)
- Below the Lights (2003)
- Isa (2004)
- Ruun (2006)
- Vertebrae (2008)
- Axioma Ethica Odini (2010)
- RIITIIR (2012)
- In Times (2015)
- E (2017)
- Utgard (2020)
- Heimdal (2023)

=== With Borknagar ===
- Borknagar (1996)
- The Olden Domain (1997)
- The Archaic Course (1998)

=== With Trinacria ===
- Travel Now Journey Infinitely (2008)

=== With Ivar Bjørnson and Einar Selvik ===
- Skuggsjá (2016)
- Hugsjá (2018)

=== With BardSpec ===
- Hydrogen (2017)
