= ...En their medh ríki fara... =

Studio album by Falkenbach
- Released: July 27, 1996
- Recorded: December 1995
- Studio: Blue House Studio
- Genre: Viking metal, black metal, folk metal
- Length: 42:36
- Label: No Colours
- Producer: Vratyas Vakyas

Falkenbach chronology
Laeknishendr (1995)	...En their medh ríki fara... (1996)	...Magni blandinn ok megintiri... (1998)

...En their medh ríki fara... (Old Norse, "...And in Glory Will They Go...") is the debut studio album by the German Viking metal band Falkenbach. The album was recorded between 18–21 December 1995 and mixed between 7-9 March 1996 at Blue House Studio. There are two CD versions of this album. The first came with a picture of Vratyas Vakyas in the booklet. Due to the album booklet's poor quality, the booklet was changed for the second version. A microcassette version was limited to 250 copies.

== Track listing ==
No.	Title	Length
1.	"Galdralag"	6:17
2.	"Heathenpride"	8:40
3.	"Læknishendr" ("Healing Hands")	6:15
4.	"Ultima Thule"	3:21
5.	"Ásum ok álfum nær..." ("Near Gods and Elves...")	7:43
6.	"Winternight"	4:20
7.	"...Into the Ardent Awaited Land..."	6:00
8.	"The Heralder" (vinyl edition bonus track)	9:05
Total length:		51:41

- The song "Læknishendr" appeared in early forms on the Læknishendr and Promo 1995 demos. It was re-recorded once more for the Heralding - The Fireblade album in 2005.
- The song "...Into the Ardent Awaited Land..." first appeared on the ...Skínn af sverði sól valtíva... demo, and as an acoustic re-recording for the Ok nefna tysvar Ty album in 2003.
- The song "Galdralag" is a re-recording of the song with the same name from the band's Promo 1995 demo.
- A remake of the song "Ultima Thule" (titled "Return to Ultima Thule") was included as a bonus track on the limited edition of the Falkenbach 2013 Asa album.

== Personnel ==
- Vratyas Vakyas - all instruments, vocals

=== Additional stuff ===
- F. Tümmers - artwork
- P. Tümmers - artwork
- Christophe Szpajdel - logo
