= Far Far North =

EP by Einherjer
- Released: 1997
- Recorded: January, March 1997
- Studio: Grieghallen Studio, Bergen/Norway
- Genre: Viking metal
- Length: 20:20
- Language: Norwegian; English
- Label: Century Media Records
- Producer: Eirik "Pytten" Hundvin; Einherjer

Einherjer chronology
Dragons of the North (1996)	Far Far North (1997)	Odin Owns Ye All (1998)

Far Far North is a three-song EP released by the band Einherjer in 1997. The final two tracks are re-recorded versions of songs from the band's 1995 EP Leve Vikingånden. Those two songs have Norwegian language lyrics, while the title track has English lyrics.

== Track listing ==
1. "Far Far North"
2. "Når Hammeren Heves"
3. "Når Aftensolen Rinner"

Music by Storesund/Glesnes. Lyrics by Glesnes/Storesund/Bjelland.

== Credits ==
- Rune Bjelland – vocals
- Frode Glesnes – guitar
- Audun Wold – guitar
- Stein Sund – bass guitar
- Gerhard Storesund – drums, synthesizer
