= Tiurida =

Studio album by Falkenbach
- Released: January 28, 2011
- Genre: Viking metal, folk metal
- Length: 40:19
- Label: Napalm
- Producer: Vratyas Vakyas

Falkenbach chronology
Heralding - The Fireblade (2005)	Tiurida (2011)	Asa (2013)

Tiurida - vinyl cover

Tiurida (meaning "Glory") is the fifth studio album by the German Viking metal band Falkenbach, released in January 2011 via Napalm Records. It was recorded with the same session musicians as the previous two Falkenbach records, Ok nefna tysvar Ty (2003) and Heralding - The Fireblade (2005). It was released as a jewelcase, digipack, deluxe limited edition (containing the digipack plus a Falkenbach logo pendant), vinyl (in three variants - black, golden and white vinyl - and with different cover artwork) and download.

== Track listing ==
No.	Title	Length
1.	"Intro"	1:38
2.	"...Where His Ravens Fly..."	7:25
3.	"Time Between Dog and Wolf"	6:01
4.	"Tanfana"	5:32
5.	"Runes Shall You Know"	5:59
6.	"In Flames"	7:53
7.	"Sunnavend"	5:51
8.	"Asaland" (bonus track)	4:06
Total length:		44:25

"Asaland" is a re-recording (and re-writing, essentially) of a song originally from the "Laeknishendr" demo released in 1995. The track is present on the digipack, vinyl and deluxe editions.

== Personnel ==
- Vratyas Vakyas - clean vocals, choirs, guitars, keyboards

=== Additional personnel ===
- Hagalaz - guitars, acoustic guitars, keyboards
- Tyrann - screams
- Alboin - bass
- Boltthorn - drums, percussion
- Patrick Damiani - engineering
- Florian - layout
- Christophe Szpajdel - logo

== Notes ==
- – Official Falkenbach forum, announcement
- – Napalm Records artist page
- — Encyclopaedia Metallum entry
