= Norwegian Native Art =

Studio album by Einherjer
- Released: 2000
- Recorded: October–November 1999 at Los Angered Recordings (Gothenburg)
- Genre: Viking metal
- Length: 39:29
- Language: English
- Label: Native North Records; Tabu Recordings
- Producer: Andy LaRocque; Einherjer

Einherjer chronology
| Odin Owns Ye All (1998) | Norwegian Native Art (2000) | Blot (2003) |

Norwegian Native Art - 2005 re-release

Norwegian Native Art is the third full-length album by the Norwegian viking metal band Einherjer. It was released on 11 September 2000 by Native North Records.

== Track listing ==
1. "Wyrd of the Dead" – 4:51
2. "Doomfaring" – 4:45
3. "Hugin's Eyes" – 4:15
4. "Burning Yggdrasil" – 5:23
5. "Crimson Rain" – 5:17
6. "Howl Ravens Come" – 5:05
7. "Draconian Umpire" – 5:30
8. "Regicide" – 4:23

This album was re-released on 23 February 2005 by Tabu Recordings with a new cover artwork, the previously unreleased track "Oskorei" from the Blot session and the "Ironbound" video clip.

== Credits ==
- Ragnar Vikse – vocals
- Frode Glesnes – guitar, vocals
- Aksel Herløe – guitar
- Gerhard Storesund – drums, synthesizer

=== Guest musicians ===
- Stein Sund – bass guitar
- Hanne E. Andersen – Valkyrian vocals
- Andy LaRocque – solo in "Doomfaring"
