= Av oss, for oss =

Av Oss, For Oss

Studio album by Einherjer
- Released: October 27, 2014
- Recorded: 2013–2014
- Studios: Studio Borealis, Haugesund, Norway
- Genre: Viking metal
- Length: 44:09; 47:43 (Limited edition)
- Language: Norwegian
- Label: Indie Recordings
- Producer: Frode Glesnes

Einherjer chronology
Norrøn (2011)	Av Oss, For Oss (2014)

Av Oss, For Oss (By Us, for Us in Norwegian) is the sixth full-length album by the Norwegian Viking metal band Einherjer, released on October 27, 2014 through Indie Recordings.

== Track listing ==
No.	Title	Translation	Length
1.	"Fremad"	Forward	3:01
2.	"Hammer i kors"	Hammer in Cross	4:09
3.	"Nidstong"	Nithing pole	4:05
4.	"Hedensk oppstandelse"	Pagan Resurrection	4:32
5.	"Nord og Ner"	Northwards and Netherwards	5:42
6.	"Nornene"	Norns	7:38
7.	"Trelldom"	Bondage	4:15
8.	"Av oss, for oss"	By Us, for Us	10:47
9.	"Blodsbånd" (limited edition bonus track)	Blood Ties	3:34
Total length:			47:43

== Credits ==
- Gerhard Storesund - Drums, Keyboards, synthesizer
- Frode Glesnes - Guitars, Bass, Vocals
- Aksel Herløe - Guitars
