= Leve Vikingånden =

EP by Einherjer
- Released: May 1995
- Recorded: October, 1994
- Studio: Lydloftet, Ølen, Norway
- Genre: Viking metal
- Language: Norwegian
- Label: Necromantic Gallery/Damnation
- Producer: Einherjer, K.B."Sennep" Bjørkhaug

Einherjer chronology
Leve Vikingånden (1995)	Aurora Borealis (1996)

Leve Vikingånden (Long Live the Viking Spirit) is the first official release by the Norwegian heavy metal band Einherjer, following their 1993 demo Aurora Borealis. It was released on 7 inch vinyl and only 1500 copies were made. Both of its songs have Norwegian language lyrics and were re-recorded for the band's 1997 EP Far Far North. The sleeve features an image of Mjolnir.

== Track listing ==
1. "Når Hammeren Heves" (When the Hammer Heaves)
2. "Når Aftensolen Rinner" (When the Evening Sun Sets)

Music by Storesund/Glesnes. Lyrics by Glesnes/Bjelland.

== Credits ==
- Rune Bjelland – vocals
- Gerhard Storesund – drums, synthesizer
- Frode Glesnes – guitar
- Audun Wold – bass guitar

== Sources ==
- Einherjer.com: discography
