= Laeknishendr =

Demo album by Falkenbach
- Released: 1995
- Recorded: 1995
- Genre: Viking metal Black metal
- Length: 41:51
- Producer: Vratyas Vakyas

Falkenbach chronology
Laeknishendr (1995)	...En their medh ríki fara... (1995)

Laeknishendr or Læknishendr is a 1995 demo by the German Viking metal band Falkenbach. It contains some rerecorded tracks from older Falkenbach demos. According to Aðalbjörn Tryggvason of Sólstafir, this demo was recorded in one of Iceland's national parks, Þingvellir. The original version was limited to 33 units, but it was bootlegged by several labels.

The musical style is different from later Falkenbach albums. Vratyas Vakyas plays a more black/doom metal oriented sound, which is more harsh and aggressive than later works. Some of the tracks were rerecorded for later albums. Vratyas was using a Roland TR-909 drum machine. All lyrics are in Latin and Old Norse.

Laeknishendr was an important release for the development of the German Viking/pagan metal scene.

== Track listing ==
No.	Title	Length
1.	"Skirnir"	4:44
2.	"Laeknishendr"	7:52
3.	"Blond"	11:35
4.	"Wuotan Imposuerunt"	7:25
5.	"Infernum"	7:06
6.	"Asaland"	3:11
Total length:		41:53

== Personnel ==
- Vratyas Vakyas - vocals, all instruments

The bootlegged versions may have different track lengths, resulting in a different velocity.
