= Norrøn =

Studio album by Einherjer
- Released: 9 September 2011
- Studio: Studio Borealis, Haugesund, Norway
- Genre: Viking metal
- Length: 41:22
- Label: Indie Recordings
- Producer: Frode Glesnes

Einherjer chronology
Blot (2003)	Norrøn (2011)	Av oss, for oss (2013)

Norrøn (Norse) is the fifth full-length album by the Norwegian Viking metal band Einherjer and the first after the band reunited. It was released on 9 September 2011 through Indie Recordings.

== Track listing ==
No.	Title	Translation	Length
1.	"Norrøn Kraft"	Norse Power	12:54
2.	"Naglfar"	Nail Ship	5:13
3.	"Alu Alu Laukar" (Ym:Stammen cover)		2:51
4.	"Varden Brenne"	The Beacon Burns	6:21
5.	"Atter På Malmtings Blodige Voll"		8:13
6.	"Balladen Om Bifrost"	Ballad of Bifrost	5:50
Total length:			41:22

== Credits ==
- Gerhard Storesund - Drums, Keyboards, synthesizer
- Frode Glesnes - Guitars, Bass, Vocals
- Aksel Herløe - Guitars
