= ...Magni blandinn ok megintiri... =

Studio album by Falkenbach
- Released: 21 January 1998
- Genre: Viking metal, black metal, folk metal
- Length: 41:09
- Label: Napalm
- Producer: Vratyas Vakyas

Falkenbach chronology
...En their medh ríki fara... (1996)	...Magni blandinn ok megintiri... (1998)	Ok nefna tysvar Ty (2003)

...Magni blandinn ok megintiri... (Old Norse, "...Mixed with might and great fame...", a quote from the poem Sigrdrifumál) is the second studio album by the German Viking metal band Falkenbach. It was recorded at Blue House Studios in Germany. The album was re-released as a limited vinyl LP (1,000 copies) on Skaldic Art Productions in 2002.

== Track listing ==
No.	Title	Length
1.	"...When Gjallarhorn Will Sound"	8:29
2.	"...Where Blood Will Soon Be Shed"	7:15
3.	"Towards the Hall of Bronzen Shields"	6:02
4.	"The Heathenish Foray"	8:00
5.	"Walhall"	5:29
6.	"Baldurs Tod" ("Baldur's Death")	5:54
Total length:		41:09

== Personnel ==
- Vratyas Vakyas - all instruments, vocals, layout
- Christophe Szpajdel - logo
