= Blot (album) =

Studio album by Einherjer
- Released: September 15th, 2003
- Recorded: 2003
- Studio: Sifa Lydstudio, Kopervik, Norway
- Genre: Viking metal
- Length: 60:09
- Language: Norwegian; English
- Label: Tabu Recordings

Einherjer chronology
Norwegian Native Art (2000)	Blot (2003)	Norrøn (2011)

Blot is the fourth full-length album by the Norwegian Viking metal band Einherjer. It was released on 15 September 2003 by Tabu Recordings.

== Track listing ==
1. "Einherjermarsjen" – 1:38
2. "Ironbound" – 3:41
3. "Dead Knight's Rite" – 5:34
4. "Wolf-Age" – 4:44
5. "The Eternally Damned" – 3:01
6. "Ware Her Venom" – 5:57
7. "Hammar Haus" – 8:02
8. "Starkad" – 4:19
9. "Ride the Gallows" – 6:48
10. "Ingen Grid" – 4:06
11. "Berserkergang" – 5:55
12. "Venomtongue" – 6:25

== Credits ==
- Frode Glesnes - vocals, guitar
- Aksel Herløe - guitar, bass guitar
- Gerhard Storesund - drums & keyboard arrangements
