= Odin Owns Ye All =

Studio album by Einherjer
- Released: May 5th, 1998
- Recorded: March, 1998
- Studio: Los Angered Recordings, Sweden
- Genre: Viking metal
- Length: 45:37
- Language: English
- Label: Century Media Records
- Producer: Andy LaRocque, Einherjer

Einherjer chronology
Far Far North (1997)	Odin Owns Ye All (1998)	Norwegian Native Art (2000)

Odin Owns Ye All is the second full-length album by the Norwegian Viking metal band Einherjer. Its songs form a brief, but complete, narrative of the earth based on Norse mythology. The opening tracks tell the story of the giant Ymir, his death at the hands of Odin and his brothers, and the creation of the world. The later tracks tell of the murder of Balder that precipitates Ragnarok, followed by the destruction of the world and its rebirth from the sea. The album cover art is the painting “Odin and His Ravens” by Alan Lee.

== Track listing ==
1. "Leve Vikingeaanden" (Long Live the Viking Spirit) – 1:35
2. "Out of Ginnungagap" – 5:37
3. "Clash of the Elder" – 5:19
4. "Odin Owns Ye All" – 4:34
5. "Remember Tokk" – 5:30
6. "Home" – 7:16
7. "The Pathfinder & The Prophetess" – 3:42
8. "Inferno" – 4:51
9. "A New Earth" – 6:51

All Songs by Glesnes/Storesund except "Leve Vikingeaanden" and "Clash of the Elder" by Storesund

== Credits ==
- Gerhard Storesund – drums, synthesizer, backing vocals
- Frode Glesnes – guitar, backing vocals
- Ragnar Vikse – lead and backing vocals
- Erik Elden – bass guitar, backing vocals
