= Falkenbach =

German viking metal band

- Origin: Island, later Düsseldorf, Germany
- Genres: Viking metal, pagan metal, black metal, folk metal
- Years active: 1989–present
- Labels: Napalm, Prophecy
- Members: Vratyas Vakyas
- Website: falkenbach.de

Falkenbach (German: [ˈfalkənbax], lit. "Falconbrook") is a German viking/pagan metal project. Vratyas Vakyas (real name Markus Tümmers) is the one permanent member. He was born in Germany but lived in Iceland in the late 1980s. Falkenbach is one of the first viking metal bands, starting in 1989, with its first release that year.

== History ==
Falkenbach was one of Island's and Germany's first examples of pagan metal. The band was formed in Iceland in 1989, when it recorded the Hávamál demo, and has recorded seven demos; only five are known. Three more were released by 1995: Skínn af sverði sól valtíva (Old Norse, "The Sun Shines on the Swords of Slaughter-Gods"), Læknishendr (Old Norse, "Healing Hands"), and Ásynja (Old Norse, "Goddess"). Of all of these except Læknishendr, only nine copies were released.

In 1995, recording of the debut album Fireblade began, but due to equipment troubles, production was stopped before mixing. Fireblade was not released, and in December of that year, recording began for ...En their medh ríki fara... (Old Norse, "...And in Glory Will They Go..."). The recording for this debut album was completed in March 1996. The album cover features part of an illustration of the Wild Hunt, made by Friedrich Wilhelm Heine for Wilhelm Wägner's Nordisch-germanische Götter und Helden (1882). With this, Falkenbach joined a tradition connecting metal music to the Wild Hunt motif, since Bathory's Blood Fire Death (1988).

After ...Magni blandinn ok megintiri... (Old Norse, "Mixed with Strength and Pride Glory") was released, Vratyas stopped recording so he could focus on his record label, Skaldic Art Productions.

In 2003, Vratyas returned to the studio with other musicians to record Ok nefna tysvar Ty (Old Norse, "And Name Twice Týr"). The next Falkenbach album, Heralding – The Fireblade, was recorded in August–September 2005 with the session musicians from Ok Nefna Tysvar Ty. It includes material intended for the never released Fireblade album and re-workings of demo tracks.

In 2006, Skaldic Arts Productions released the tribute album An Homage to Falkenbach. It consists of two parts, each limited to 500 units. The work contains 16 covers by bands such as Eluveitie, Folkearth, and Bewitched.

Vratyas Vakyas (whose name roughly translates to "the searching wanderer"), the sole member of Falkenbach, lives in Düsseldorf, Germany.

== Style and lyrical themes ==
The Hávamál demo is allegedly clean folk music, but since then the sound has become more raw and influenced by black metal influence and matured into an epic metal sound.

Most of Falkenbach lyrics are in English. They also write lyrics in Old Norse, Latin, and Old German. Most, if not all of the lyrics in Old Norse are actually taken from heathen literature: for example, the chorus lines in the song "Donar's Oak" are actually verses four and five of Grímnismál, a poem of the Elder Edda. (Hávamál, after which the first demo is named, is another such poem.)

According to Vratyas, one thing that sets Falkenbach apart from a band such Bathory is that his music is underpinned by a pagan religiosity. Vratyas defines his approach to paganism as animistic, through which it rejects the existence of a frontier between a person and the outer world.

== Members ==
=== Current members ===
- Vratyas Vakyas – guitar, acoustic guitar, keyboards, drums, vocals

=== Session members ===
- Hagalaz – guitars on Ok nefna tysvar Ty, Heralding – The Fireblade and Tiurida
- Tyrann – vocals on Ok nefna tysvar Ty, Heralding – The Fireblade and Tiurida
- Boltthorn – drums on Ok nefna tysvar Ty, Heralding – The Fireblade and Tiurida
- Albion – bass on Tiurida

== Discography ==
Studio albums

- ...En their medh ríki fara... (1996)
- ...Magni blandinn ok megintiri... (1998)
- Ok nefna tysvar Ty (2003)
- Heralding – The Fireblade (2005)
- Tiurida (2011)
- Asa (2013)

Demos

- Hávamál (1989)
- Tanfana (1990)
- Towards Solens Golden Light (1991)
- Promo '95 (1995)
- Laeknishendr (1995)
- ...Skínn af sverði sól valtíva... (1996)

== See also ==
- Neopagan music
