= Stein Sund =

- Origin: Karmøy Municipality, Norway
- Genres: Viking metal
- Occupation: Guitarist
- Instrument: Bass guitar

Stein Sund is a bass guitarist from Karmøy Municipality who was a longtime member of the Norwegian viking metal band Einherjer.

He has several projects up and running such as Thundra, Evig Natt, and Dwelling Souls.
