= Asa (album) =

Studio album by Falkenbach
- Released: November 1, 2013
- Genre: Viking metal, black metal, folk metal
- Length: 41:21
- Label: Prophecy Productions
- Producer: Vratyas Vakyas

Falkenbach chronology
Tiurida (2011)	Asa (2013)

Singles from Asa
- 1. "Eweroun" Released: April 26th, 2013

Asa is the sixth studio album by the German Viking metal band Falkenbach. It was released in 2013 on Prophecy Productions. The lyrics are written in Limburgish. Tümmers says he chose to use the language as it is the language of his ancestors.

== Reception ==
Yvonne Duchateau of Sonic Seducer, Markus Endres of Metal.de and Filip Van Muylem of Peek-a-Boo Magazine commented that the album combines stylistic elements from Falkenbach's entire career. Duchateau wrote that what is new is the presence of more quiet songs with clear vocals, such as "Eweroun" and "Bluot fuër bluot", which gives a more immediate impression; Endres wrote that "[i]n this tension between Nordic folklore with acoustic guitars and clear vocals, Pagan / Black Metal with sawing riffs, melodic keyboards and harsh voice, Asa comes alive". Van Muylem called the combination of different expressions a "successful amalgamation of tradition without any clichés and fiery passion".

== Track listing ==
No.	Title	Length
1.	"Vaer stjernar vaerdan" ("Where Stars Become")	4:39
2.	"Wulfarweijd" ("Wolfhunting")	3:52
3.	"Mijn laezt wourd" ("My Last Word(s)")	3:45
4.	"Bronzen Embrace"	4:02
5.	"Eweroun" ("Forever")	5:50
6.	"I nattens stilta" ("In Silence of the Night")	6:24
7.	"Bluot fuër bluot" ("Blood for Blood")	3:58
8.	"Stikke wound" ("Hidden Wound(s)")	2:57
9.	"Ufirstanan folk" ("The Revived Folk")	5:53
Total length:		41:21

Bonus CD
No.	Title	Length
1.	"Beloved Feral Winter"	5:10
2.	"En lintinbluitin faran..." ("And Lime Blossoms Are Falling...")	4:47
3.	"Return to Ultima Thule"	3:26
4.	"I svertar sunna luihtint" ("In/From Swords the Sun Shines/Reflects")	5:59
Total length:		19:22

== Personnel ==
- Vratyas Vakyas - all instrument, vocals

=== Additional personnel ===
- Nikos Mavridis - violin
- Tyrann - vocals
- Hagalaz - guitars
- Boltthorn - drums
- Patrick Damiani - mixing
- Robin Schmidt - mastering
- Albert Bierstadt - artwork
- Costin Chioreanu - layout
- Christophe Szpajdel - logo
