= Ok nefna tysvar Ty =

Studio album by Falkenbach
- Released: November 3, 2003
- Genres: Viking metal, folk metal, black metal
- Length: 40:00
- Label: Napalm
- Producer: Vratyas Vakyas

Falkenbach chronology
...Magni blandinn ok megintiri... (1998)	Ok nefna tysvar Ty (2003)	Heralding – The Fireblade (2005)

Professional ratings
Review scores
Source	Rating
Rock Hard	8.5/10 stars
Metal.de	9/10 stars
Chronicles of Chaos	8/10 stars
Scream Magazine	3/6 stars
Exclaim!	
Powermetal.de	

Ok nefna tysvar Ty (Old Norse, "And Call Týr Twice", from Sigrdrífumál 6) is the third studio album by the German Viking metal band Falkenbach. The digipak version comes in a cover embossed in black and gold, and contains an Internet link to the Edda lines sung in "Donar's Oak". The album was re-released by Hammerheart Records in 2011 on 12" vinyl. Limited to 100 copies on clear vinyl and 400 copies on gold vinyl.

== Track listing ==
No.	Title	Length
1.	"Vanadis"	9:25
2.	"...As Long as Winds Will Blow..."	4:03
3.	"Aduatuza"	4:35
4.	"Donar's Oak"	4:49
5.	"...The Ardent Awaited Land"	3:29
6.	"Homeward Shore"	5:32
7.	"Farewell"	8:07
Total length:		40:00

== Personnel ==
- Vratyas Vakyas - all instruments, vocals

=== Additional personnel ===
- Tyrann - additional vocals
- Hagalaz - acoustic guitar
- Boltthorn - drums
- Christophe Szpajdel - logo
- Patrick Damiani - engineering
