= Frode Glesnes =

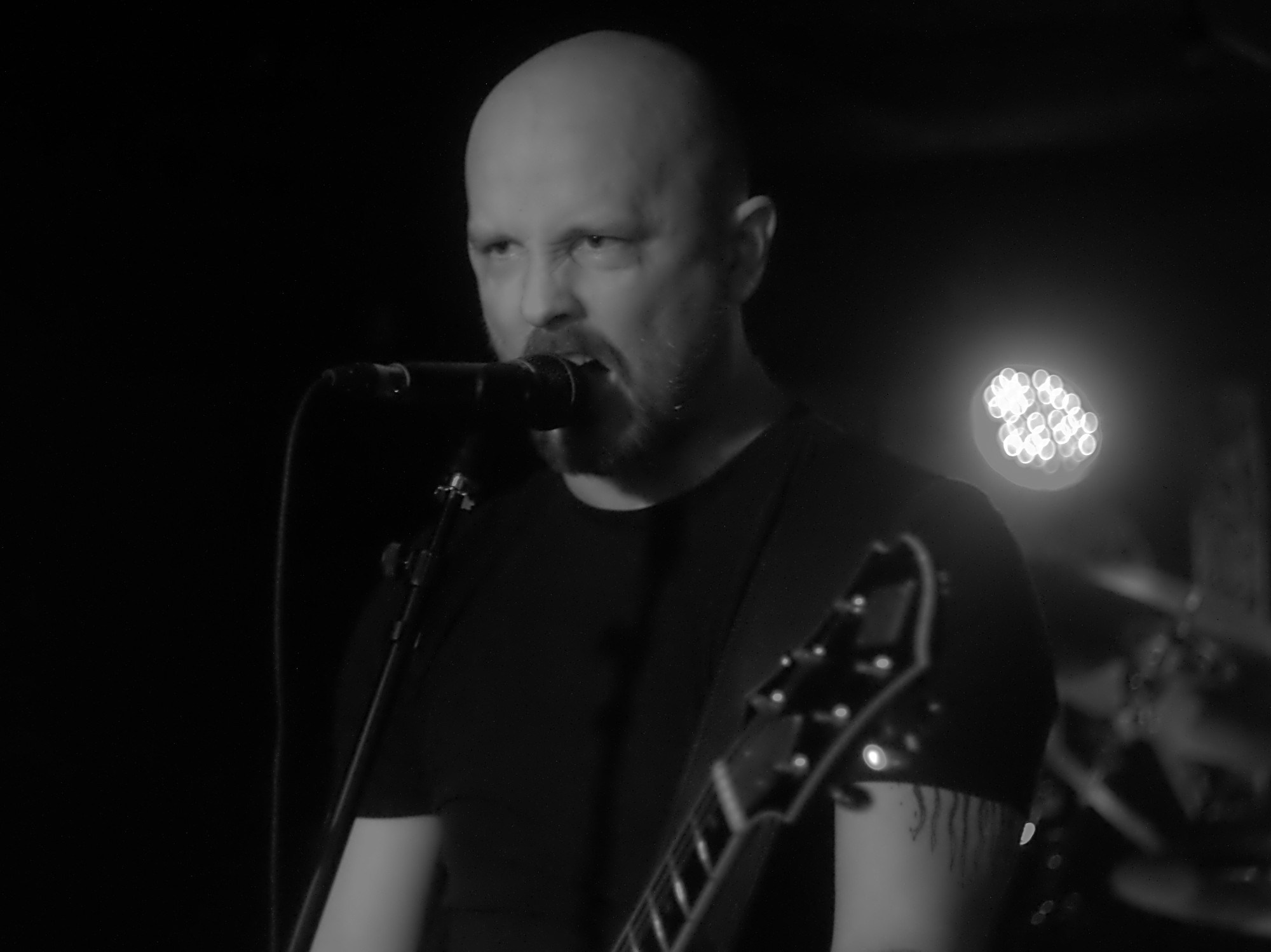
- Frode Glesnes in 2013

Background information
- Also known as: Grimar
- Born: Frode Glesnes
- Genres: Death metal, black metal, Viking metal, thrash metal
- Instruments: Guitar, bass, vocals, keyboards

Frode Glesnes (born 7 October 1974) is one of the founders of the Norwegian Viking metal band Einherjer. He started as guitarist/vocalist, but decided to concentrate on the guitar duties. He did the lead vocals on Einherjer's last album, Blot. He started a new band with the other Einherjer members called Battered. He did the lead vocals on their first demo recording, but they chose a new singer. He also had a couple of projects with Einherjer drummer Gerhard Storesund called Angelgrinder and Beelzebub.

== Major discography ==
=== With Einherjer ===
- Dragons of the North (1996)
- Odin Owns Ye All (1998)
- Norwegian Native Art (2000)
- Blot (2003)
- Norrøn (2011)
- Av oss, for oss (2014)

=== With Battered ===
- Battered (2006)
