= Einherjer =

Norwegian Viking metal band

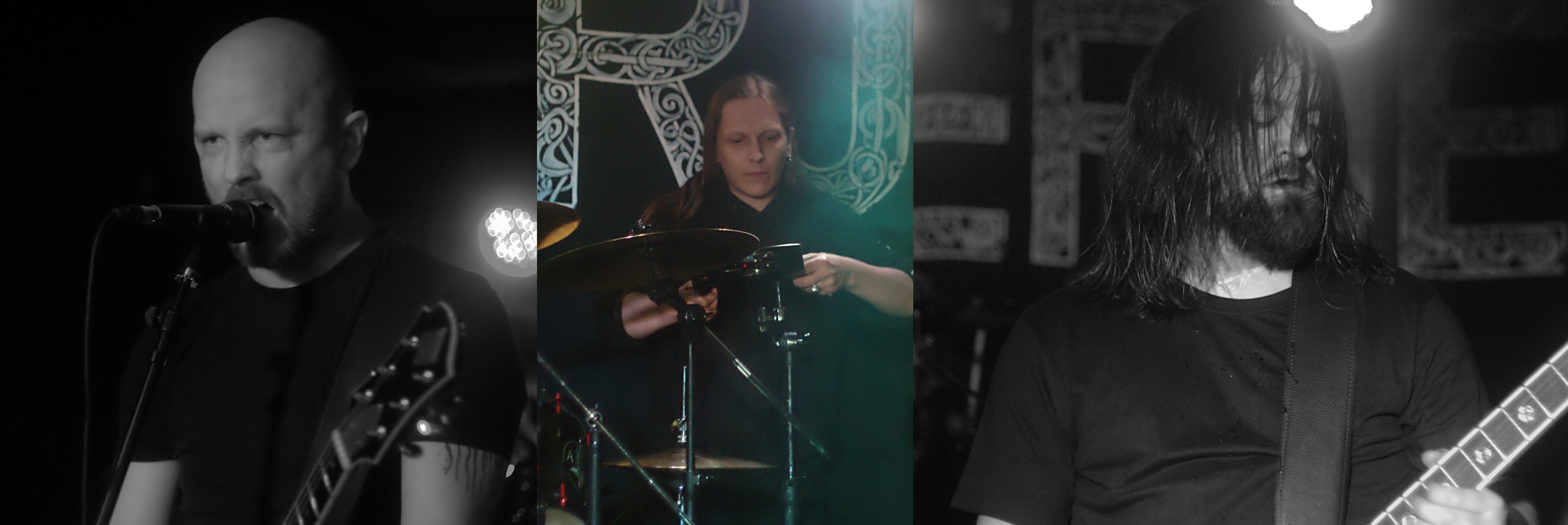
- Einherjer (Frode Glesnes, Gerhard Storesund and Aksel Herløe) in 2013.

Background information
- Origin: Haugesund, Norway
- Genre: Viking metal
- Years active: 1993–2004; 2008–present
- Labels: Napalm Records; Century Media Records; Tabu Recordings; Indie Recordings
- Members: Frode Glesnes; Gerhard Storesund; Ole Sønstabø; Tom Enge
- Website: einherjer.com

Einherjer is a Viking metal band from Haugesund, Norway, founded in 1993. Some of the band's albums are folk-influenced, while others have a traditional symphonic black metal sound. Their lyrics retell Norse legends, and each album has a theme. The band split up in early 2004 after releasing the album Blot in December 2003, but later reformed.

In December 2004, all members of Einherjer's last lineup, including founders Frode Glesnes and Gerhard Storesund, formed thrash metal band Battered with bass guitarist Ole Moldesæther.

In September 2008, Einherjer reunited to play select shows across Europe in 2009, including the Ragnarök, Kaltenbach and Wacken festivals. The band signed with Indie Recordings in December 2010. Their first album in eight years, Norrøn, was released in September 2011. Einherjer has since released four more studio albums. The latest, Lifeblood, was released on June 19, 2026.

== Name ==
The band's name is taken from Norse mythology, where the term Einherjar describes slain warriors who have gone to Valhalla and joined Odin's table.

== Battered ==
The band reformed in 2004 as thrash band Battered, including Glesnes, Storesund, and Herløe. Singer Siggy Olaisen joined them in 2005. The band released one demo, ...Beyond Recognition, and one album, also named Battered, before disbanding. The self-titled debut album was released February 27, 2006, in Norway, and March 13 in the rest of Europe. The American release date for the album was April 4, 2006.

== Personnel ==
=== Current lineup ===
- Frode Glesnes (previously Grimar) - vocals, guitar and bass (1993–2004, 2008–present)
- Gerhard Storesund (previously Ulvar) - drums and keys (1993–2004, 2008–present)
- Ole Sønstabø - Lead guitar (2016–present)
- Tom Enge - Guitar & backing vocals (2020–present)

=== Previous members ===
- Aksel Herløe - guitar (1999–2004, 2008–2020)
- Rune Bjelland (previously Nidhogg) - vocals (1993–1997)
- Audun Wold (previously Thonar) - bass, keyboards, guitar (1993–1997)
- Stein Sund - bass (1995–1997)
- Ragnar Vikse - vocals (1997–2002)
- Erik Elden - bass (1998)

=== Session and touring musicians ===
- Tchort - bass (1998–1999)
- Stein Sund - bass (1999)
- Jon Lind - bass (2000–2001)
- V'Gandr - bass (2001)
- Kjell Håvardsholm - bass (2002)
- Sigve Husebø - bass (2003)
- Eirik Svendsbø - backing vocals and bass (2008–2014)

== Battered band members ==
- Sigurd "Siggy" Olaisen - lead vocals (Headblock)
- Frode Glesnes - guitar and vocals (Einherjer)
- Aksel Herløe - guitar (ex-Einherjer)
- Gerhard Storesund - drums (Einherjer)
- Ole Moldesæther - bass (Headblock)

== Discography ==
=== Studio albums ===
- Dragons of the North (1996)
- Odin Owns Ye All (1998)
- Norwegian Native Art (2000)
- Blot (2003)
- Norrøn (2011)
- Av Oss For Oss (2014)
- Dragons of the North XX (2016)
- Norrøne Spor (2018)
- North Star (2021)
- Lifeblood (2026)

=== EPs ===
- Leve Vikingånden (1995)
- Aurora Borealis (1996)
- Far Far North (1997)

=== Compilation albums ===
- Aurora Borealis / Leve vikingånden (2013)

=== Demos ===
- Aurora Borealis (1994)
- ...Beyond Recognition, (Battered) 2004
