= Viking metal =

Subgenre of heavy metal

- Stylistic origins: Black metal; Nordic folk; sea shanties
- Cultural origins: Late 1980s – mid-1990s; Northern Europe
- Typical instruments: Electric guitar; bass guitar; drums; keyboards; vocals; Nordic folk instruments
- Derivative forms: Pagan metal

Regional scenes
- Nordic countries; Austria; Canada; Germany; Netherlands; Russia; United Kingdom; United States

Other topics
- List of bands; Norse mythology; Norse religion; Viking revival; Viking rock; Heathenry; Völkisch movement; Celtic metal; pirate metal; neo-folk

Viking metal is a subgenre of heavy metal music characterized by a lyrical and thematic focus on Norse mythology, Norse paganism, and the Viking Age. Viking metal is quite diverse as a musical style, to the point where some consider it more a cross-genre term than a genre, but it originated out of black metal with influences from Nordic folk music. Common traits include a slow-paced and heavy riffing style, anthemic choruses, use of both sung and harsh vocals, a reliance on folk instrumentation, and often the use of keyboards for atmospheric effect.

Viking metal emerged from black metal during the late 1980s and early 1990s, sharing with black metal an opposition to Christianity, but rejecting Satanism and occult themes in favor of the Vikings and paganism. It is similar, in lyrics, sound, and thematic imagery, to pagan metal, but pagan metal has a broader mythological focus and uses folk instrumentation more extensively. Most Viking metal bands originate from the Nordic countries, and nearly all bands claim that their members descend, directly or indirectly, from Vikings. Many scholars view Viking metal and the related black, pagan, and folk metal genres as part of the broader modern Pagan movements, as well as part of a global movement of renewed interest in, and celebration of, local and regional ethnicities.

Though artists such as Led Zeppelin, Yngwie Malmsteen, Heavy Load, Manowar, and many others had previously dealt with Viking themes, Bathory from Sweden is generally credited with pioneering the style with its albums Blood Fire Death (1988) and Hammerheart (1990), which launched a renewed interest in the Viking Age among heavy metal musicians. Enslaved, from Norway, followed up on this burgeoning Viking trend with Hordanes Land (1993) and Vikingligr Veldi (1994). Burzum, Emperor, Einherjer, and Helheim, among others, helped further develop the genre in the early and mid-1990s. As early as 1989 with the founding of the German band Falkenbach, Viking metal began spreading from the Nordic countries to other nations with Viking history or an even broader Germanic heritage and has since influenced musicians across the globe. The death metal bands Unleashed, Amon Amarth, and Ensiferum, which emerged in the early 1990s, also adopted Viking themes, broadening the style from its primarily black metal origin.

== Background ==
=== Vikings ===
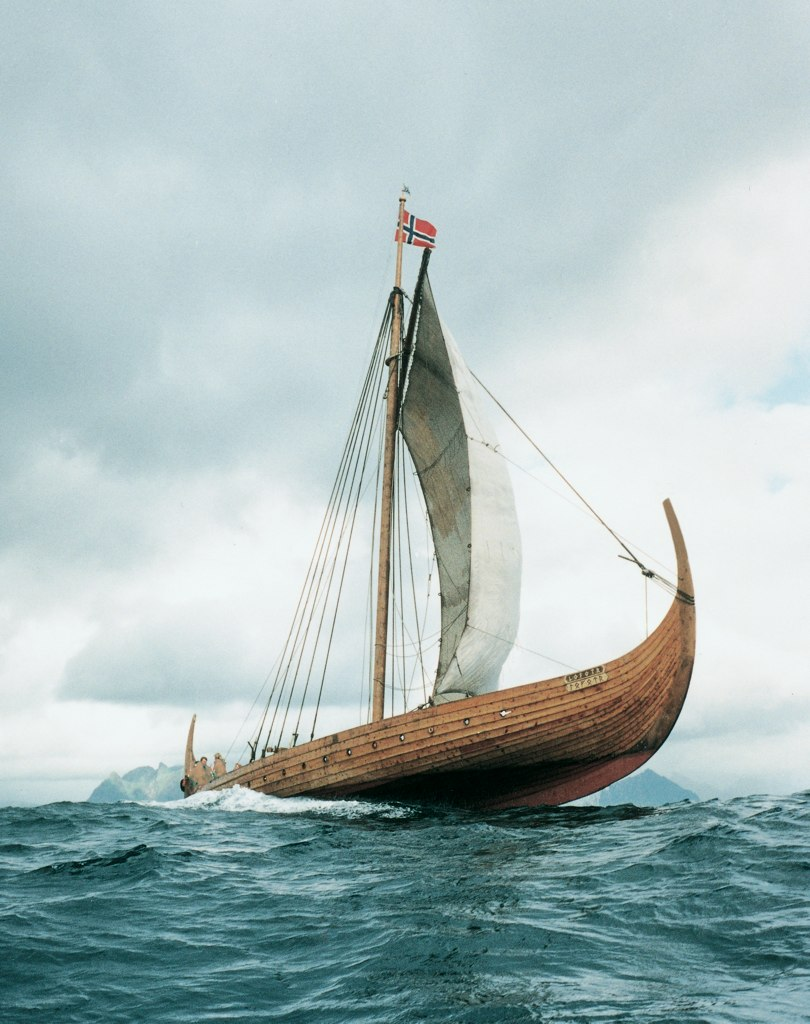
A replica longship, Lofotr

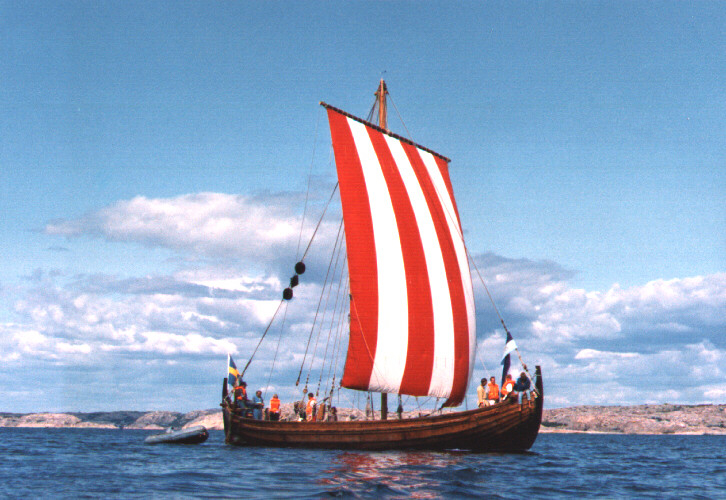
The Vindfamne, a replica knarr

The longship and knarr enabled Vikings to embark on far-reaching military and trading expeditions.

Viking metal features the Vikings as its subject matter and for evocative imagery. The Vikings were Northern European seafarers and adventurers who, during the Middle Ages, relied on sailing vessels such as longships, knerrir, and karvi to explore, raid, pirate, trade, and settle along the North Atlantic, Baltic, Mediterranean, Black Sea, and Caspian coasts and Eastern European river systems. The Viking Age is generally cited as beginning in 793, when a Viking raid struck Lindisfarne, and concluding in 1066, with the death of Harald Hardrada and the Norman conquest of England. During this two-hundred-year period, the Vikings ventured west as far as Ireland and Iceland in the North Atlantic and Greenland and what is now Newfoundland in North America, south as far as the Kingdom of Nekor (Morocco), Italy, Sicily, and Constantinople in the Mediterranean, and southeast as far as what are now Belarus, Russia, and Ukraine in Eastern Europe, Georgia in the Caucasus, and Baghdad in the Middle East.

The Vikings originated from the Nordic countries and the Baltic states, and consisted mostly of Scandinavians, though Finns, Estonians, and Curonians, went on voyages as well. Sámi people also closely interacted with the Scandinavian Norse and engaged in widespread trade expeditions. While otherwise disparate peoples, they shared some commonalities in that they were not considered "civilized" and were not, at first, adherents to Christianity, instead following their indigenous Nordic and Finnic religions. They often adopted Christianity upon settling in an area, intermixing the faith with their own pagan traditions, and by the end of the Viking Age, all Scandinavian kingdoms were Christianized and what remained of Viking cultures was absorbed into Christian Europe.

=== Nordic folk music ===
Nordic folk music encompasses traditions from Denmark, Norway, Sweden, Finland, Iceland and the dependent countries Åland, Faroe Islands, and Greenland, and nearby regions. Specific instruments vary between countries and regions, but some common instruments include the lur, säckpipa, Hardanger fiddle, keyed fiddle, willow flute, harp, mouth harp, and animal horns. Common genres in Nordic folk include ballads, herding music, and dance music, genres which trace back to the medieval era. Often, Nordic melodies will contain the phrase C^{2}-B-G.

In Swedish folk music, songs are monophonic, unemotional, and solemn in character, though working and festive songs might be more lively and rhythmic. Danish songs melodies tend to lean toward the major. In Icelandic folk music, the rímur, a form of epic poem dating back to the medieval era and Viking Age, is prominent. Faroese music contains dances directly descended from medieval ballad and epic poems, particularly from literature in the Icelandic tradition, and often follows unusual time signatures. Many Norwegian folk ballads follow a four-stanza structure known as stev. Stev alternate a trochaic tetrameter with a trimeter, and lines typically rhyme following an ABCB scheme, though stev are not standardized. Finnish folk music tends to be based on Karelian traditions and the meter and thematic material found in the Kalevala. These themes include magic, mysticism, shamanism, Viking sea voyages, Christian legends, and ballads and dance songs. The older runo song tradition follows meters such as 5/4, 5/8, or 2/4. Under Swedish and German influence, a newer, round-dance tradition based on the runo emerged – the rekilaulu – and these usually follow a 2/4 or 4/4 time. Sámi music traditions (music from the Sámi people throughout Fennoscandia) historically were rather insular, exerting little influence on the music of surrounding cultures. Sámi music is known for joiking, improvised singing particular to the performer. These songs are often sung accompanied by a drum.

=== Black metal ===
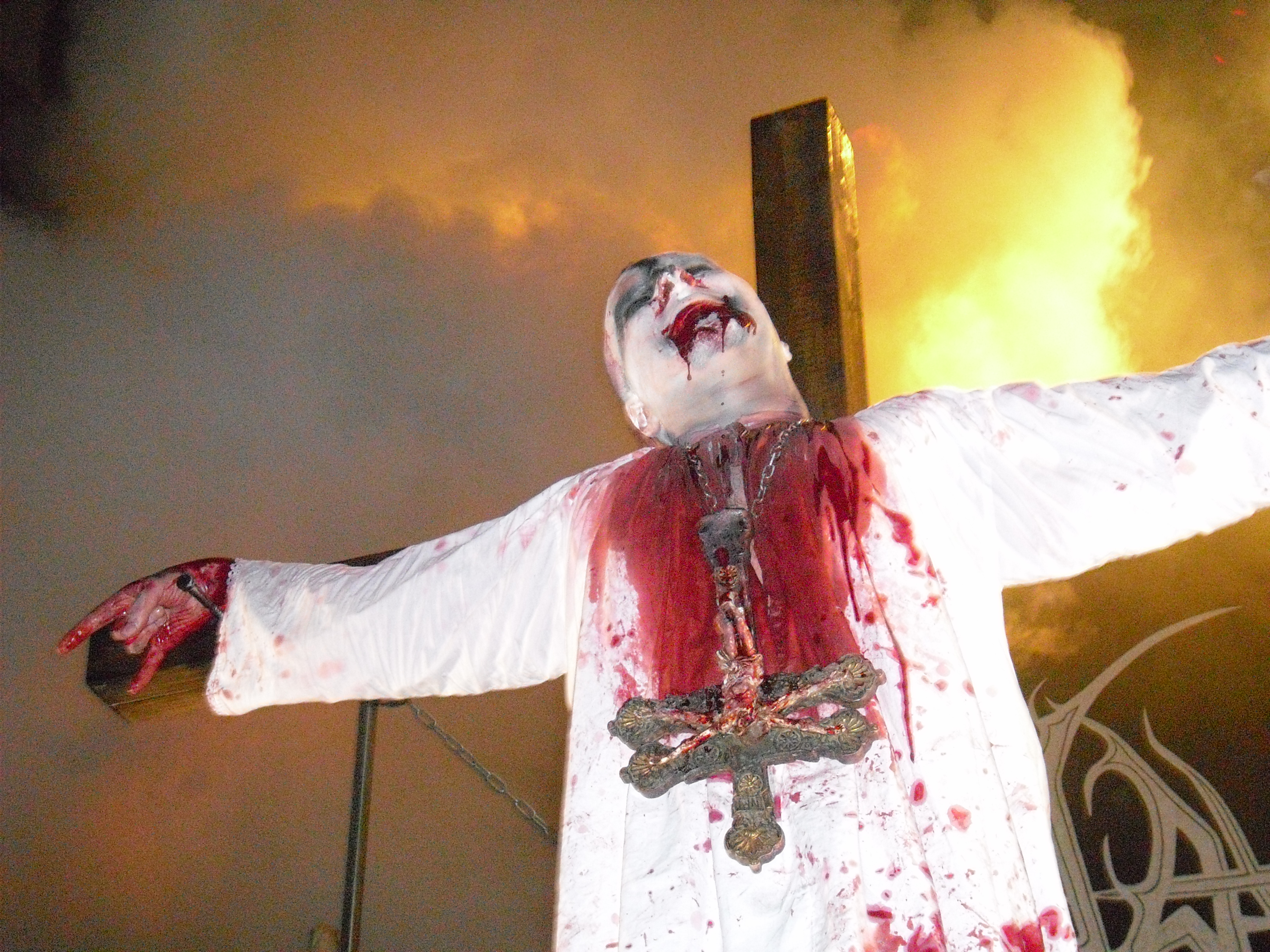
Attila Csihar of Mayhem, a formative band in the second wave of black metal

Black metal is an extreme subgenre of heavy metal music that, mostly in Europe, emerged from speed metal and thrash metal in the 1980s. A "first wave" began in the early to mid-1980s, through the work of bands such as Venom, Hellhammer, Celtic Frost, Mercyful Fate, and Bathory. The name black metal is taken from the 1982 album of the same name by Venom, while Bathory's 1984 self-titled release is generally regarded as the first true black metal record. A "second wave" developed in part as a reaction to the burgeoning death metal genre, and in part inspired by the Teutonic thrash metal scene. It was headed by the early Norwegian black metal scene, through artists such as Mayhem, Darkthrone, Burzum, Immortal, Emperor, Satyricon, Thorns, Ulver, and Gorgoroth. The early Norwegian scene became infamous for murders, assaults, and numerous church arsons committed by members of the scene. Black metal lyrical themes are focused on Satan and Satanism, which many first-wave bands used with a tongue-in-cheek approach, contrary to the more serious beliefs and vehement anti-Christian sentiment of many second-wave bands.

Musically, the first wave of bands were just considered to be playing heavier forms of metal – Venom was part of the new wave of British heavy metal, Celtic Frost was variously described as thrash metal or death metal, and Quorthon of Bathory simply labeled his music "heavy metal". It was not until the second wave that black metal was more clearly defined. A key development during that period was a guitar playing style featuring fast, un-muted tremolo picking or "buzz picking", introduced by Euronymous of Mayhem and Snorre Ruch ("Blackthorn") of Thorns. Other common traits for guitar playing include a high-pitched or treble guitar tone and heavy distortion. Solos and dropped tunings are rare. Overall, the guitar sound tends to be "thin and brittle" compared to other heavy metal genres, with the idea of "heaviness" conveyed through harshness and timbral density rather than low frequency. The bass guitar tends to be buried under the guitar tones, even non-existent. Drums and even vocals are likewise often mixed low, with these production techniques resulting in a blurred "wash" of sound. Vocals are usually high-pitched and raspy shrieks, screams, and snarls, and rarely gutturals and death growls are also employed. The use of keyboards is also frequent.

The influence of Scandinavian folk music within Norwegian black metal is apparent in the use by some guitarists belonging to that scene of drones and modal melodies reminiscent of the folk tradition. Terje Bakken of Windir explained that ancient Nordic folk is easily integrated into metal idiom due to the "sad atmosphere" the two genres have in common. Production values within black metal are often raw and lo-fidelity. Originally, this was merely because many early second-wave bands lacked the resources to record properly, but the practice was continued by successful bands in order to identify with their genre's underground origins. Though featuring these common traits, black metal spawned diverse musical approaches and subgenres, with some bands taking more experimental and avant-garde directions. Other bands, such as Cradle of Filth and Dimmu Borgir, embraced a more commercial sound and production aesthetic instead.

=== Precursors ===
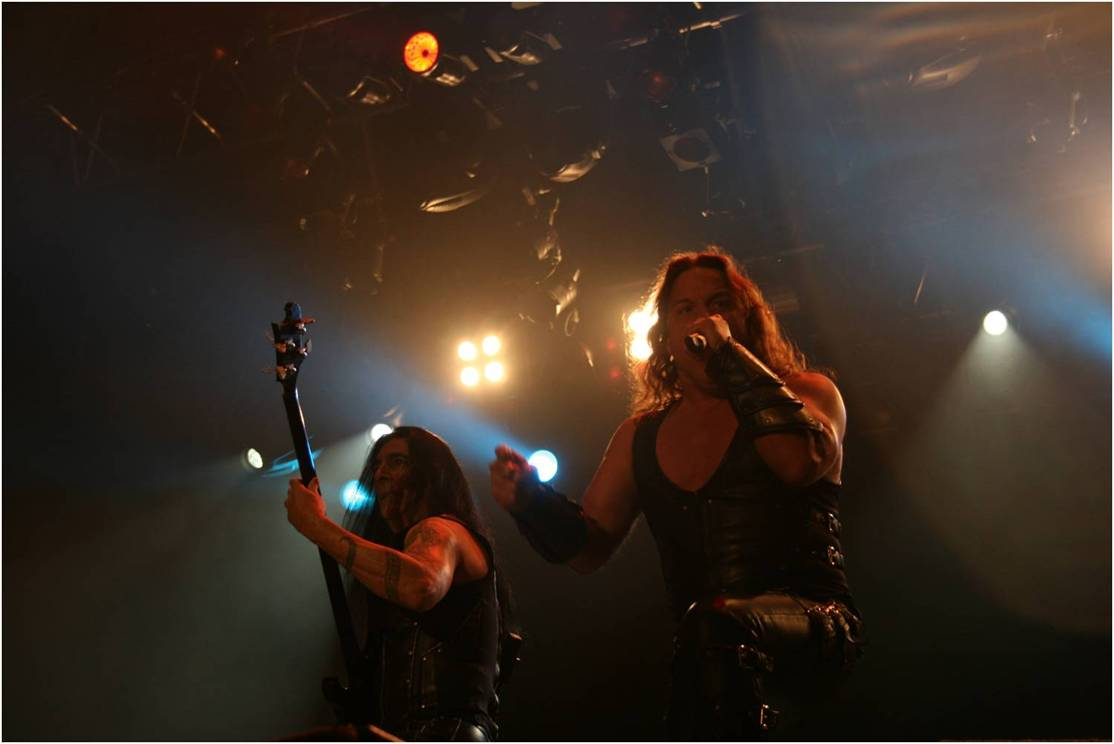
Manowar (seen here in 2009) is an early example of a band that made use of Viking themes.

The use of Viking themes and imagery in hard rock and heavy metal music predates the advent of Viking metal. For instance, the lyrics to Led Zeppelin's "Immigrant Song" (1970) and "No Quarter" (1973) feature allusions to Viking voyages, violence, and exploration. The music journalist Martin Popoff credits "Immigrant Song" as "the first Viking metal song ever". The Swedish band Heavy Load often wrote Viking-themed songs, such as the 1978 song "Son of the Northern Light" and the 1983 songs "Singing Swords" and "Stronger than Evil" from their album Stronger Than Evil (which features an imagined Norse warrior on the cover art), the latter song which music journalist Eduardo Rivadavia claims establishes a case for Heavy Load as the first Viking metal group. Silver Mountain, another Swedish group, according to Rivadavia possessed better "Viking metal credentials" than any other predecessors to the genre; they released the song "Vikings" in 1983 on their album Shakin' Brains.

Many other bands in the early and mid-1980s featured Viking-themed music. Two British groups released Viking-themed songs: Iron Maiden released "Invaders", a song about Norse marauders from their album The Number of the Beast, and A II Z released "Valhalla Force" on their extended play No Fun After Midnight. In 1985, the American group Pantera released the song "Valhalla" on their album I Am the Night, and the American band Crimson Glory released a song of the same name a year later on their self-titled debut. Swedish neoclassical metal guitarist Yngwie Malmsteen sometimes featured themes of hyper-masculinity, heroic warriors, and Vikings; for example, on his 1985 album Marching Out. The British band Blitzkrieg's 1985 album A Time of Changes frequently references Viking themes with songs such as "Ragnorak" and "Vikings". Elixir, also from Britain, titled their 1986 debut The Son of Odin, an album which includes a song of the same name that urges listeners to put their faith in Odin.

The German band Grave Digger and American band Manowar, both of which formed in 1980, drew upon Norse myth as envisioned in Richard Wagner's Der Ring des Nibelungen. Faithful Breath – which wore fur and horned helmet costumes – and TNT also experimented with Viking themes. Manowar adopted Viking imagery much more heavily than other bands, turning out copious amounts of songs devoted to Viking lore, and became known as the "champions of the furry loincloth"; they met with ridicule even within the metal community but attracted a cult following. Unlike the later Viking metal bands, Manowar did not bother with the historicity of popular Viking image, and did not in any way identify with the Vikings, religiously or racially. Trafford and Pluskowski explain that "the Manowar version of the Vikings owes as much to Conan the Barbarian as it does to history, saga, or Edda: What matters to Manowar is untamed masculinity, and the Vikings are for them merely the archetypal barbarian males." Similarly, Vlad Nichols of Ultimate Guitar states that on Heavy Load's Stronger Than Evil, which might be the earliest contribution to the idea of Viking metal, most of the songs have as much to do with historical Vikings as the 1958 The Vikings film; that is, the portrayal of Norsemen is of warmongering invaders at best, and more so uses the Vikings as a means to sing about macho, loin-cloth wearing barbarians.

== Characteristics ==
=== Musical traits ===
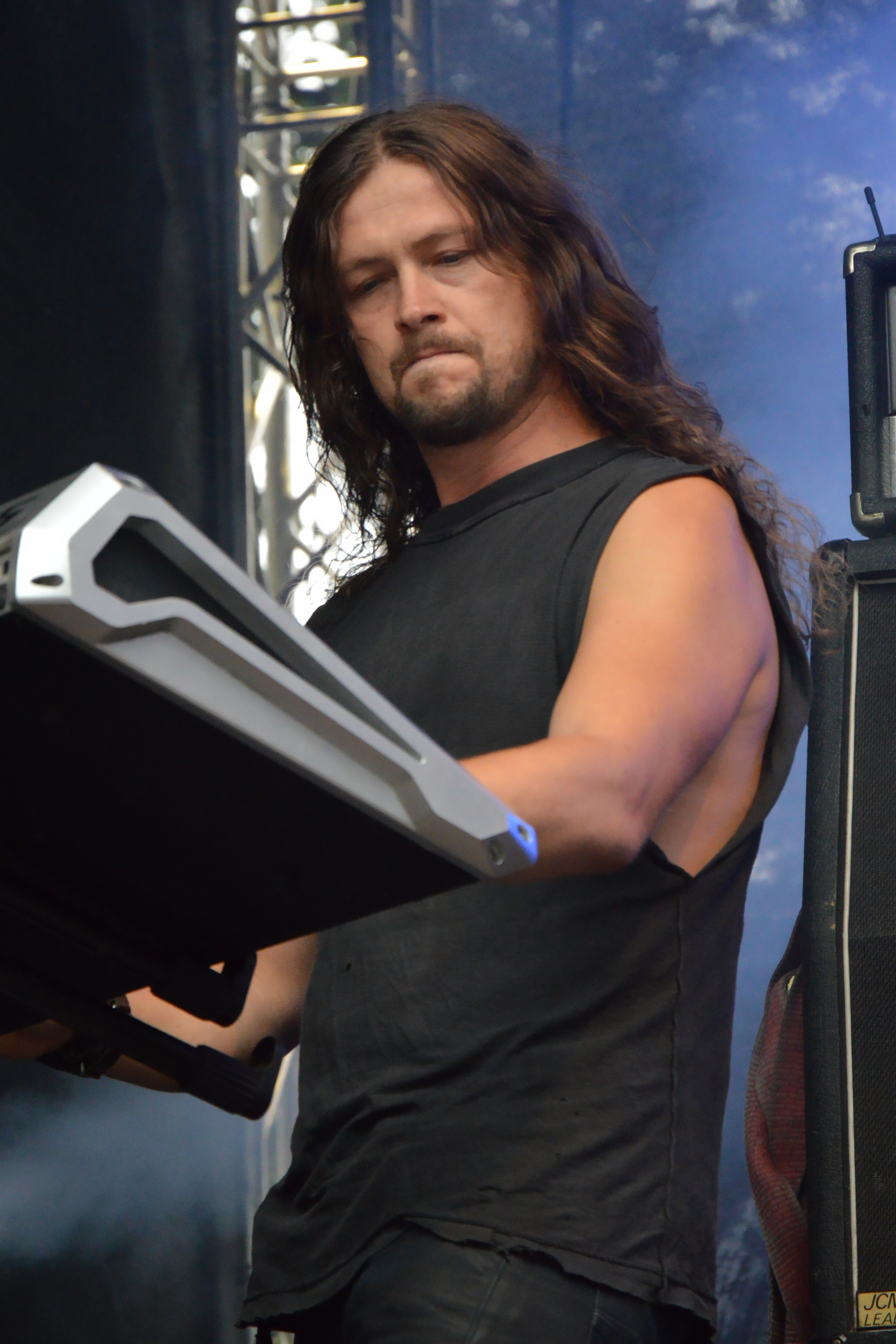
Govern of Wolfchant. Keyboards are commonly used by Viking metal artists, and are often played at a "swift, galloping pace".

Overall, Viking metal is hard to define since, apart from certain elements like anthem-like choruses, it is not based entirely on musical features and overlaps with other metal genres, with origins in black and death metal. Some bands, such as Unleashed and Amon Amarth, play death metal, but incorporate Viking themes and thus are labeled as part of the genre. Generally, Viking metal is defined more by its thematic material and imagery than musical qualities. Rather than being a mock-up of medieval music, "it is in the band names, album titles, artwork of album covers and, especially, in the song lyrics that Viking themes are so evident." Viking metal, and the closely related style pagan metal, is more of a term or "etiquette" than a musical style. Since they are defined chiefly by lyrical focus, any musical categorizations of these two styles is controversial. Thus, Viking metal is more of a cross-genre term than a descriptor of a certain sound. Ashby and Schofield write that "The term 'Viking metal' is one of many that falls within a complex web of genres and subgenres, the precise form of which is constantly shifting, as trends and fads emerge and fade." From its origins in black metal, Viking metal "has diversified (at least in aural terms), and now covers a range of styles that run the gamut between black metal and what one might justifiably term classic rock". Imke von Helden states that Viking metal is one of a few metal styles defined by song content and visual elements rather than sonic components, which could be folk, black, or death metal. Christopher McIntosh writes that Viking metal, Viking rock, pagan metal, folk metal, neofolk, and more could all fall under a broader genre term of "neo-Nordic." The term "Viking metal" has sometimes been used as a nickname for the 1990s Norwegian black metal scene, which was "noisy, chaotic, and often augmented by sorrowful keyboard melodies". It has also been variously described as a subgenre of black metal, albeit one that abandoned black metal's Satanic imagery, "slow black metal" with influences from Nordic folk music, straddling black metal and folk metal almost equally, or running the gamut from "folk to black to death metal". Typically, Viking metal artists rely extensively on keyboards, which are often played at a "swift, galloping pace". These artists often add "local cultural flourishes" such as traditional instruments and ethnic melodies. It is similar to folk metal, and is sometimes categorized as such, but it uses folk instruments less extensively. For vocals, Viking metal incorporates both singing and the typical black metal screams and growls.

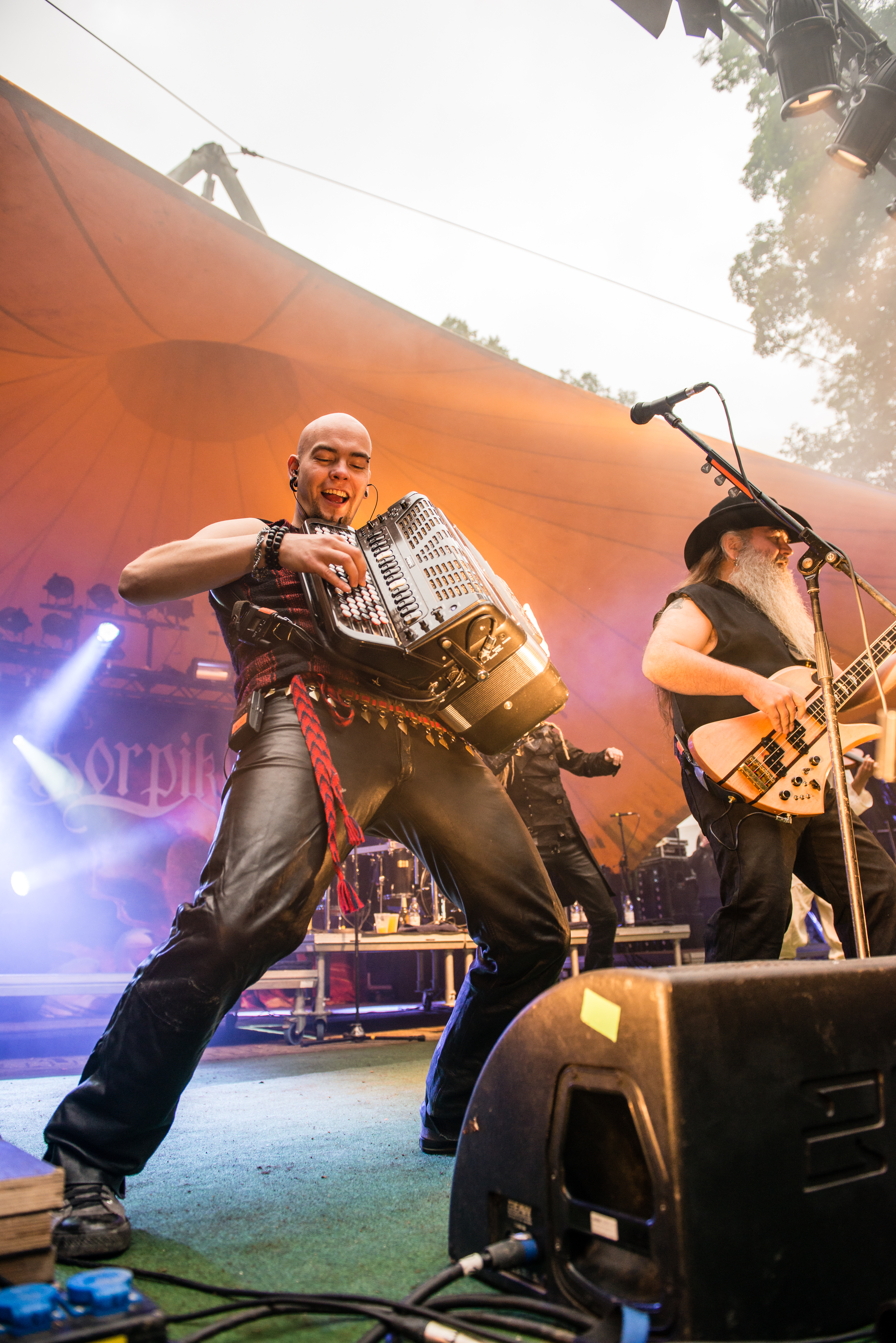
Sámi Perttula of Korpiklaani. Viking metal often uses folk instruments, though not as extensively as the related genre of folk metal.

"Shores in Flames" by Bathory
"Shores in Flames" by Bathory, from the album Hammerheart (1990), describes a Viking raid and features the sound of waves and prayerful singing.

"793 (Slaget Om Lindisfarne)" by Enslaved
"793 (Slaget Om Lindisfarne)" by Enslaved, from the album Eld (1997), features "Viking themes, razor sharp guitars, blastbeat drums, and an ear for orchestration resulting in complex structures, bountiful harmonies and time changes".

Starting with the album Blood Fire Death, one of the first definitive Viking metal releases, Bathory incorporated a diverse range of musical elements. While retaining the noise and chaos of previous recordings, the band took a more sorrowful and melodic approach, working in ballads based on Germanic and Norse folklore, shanty-like melodies, ambience, choral intros, acoustic instruments, anthemic sections, and folk music elements such as bourdon sounds, Jew's harps, and fifes. Bathory added natural found sounds, such as ocean waves, thunder, and wild animal noises, in a style similar to that of musique concrète. Instruments were sometimes used to create onomatopoeic effects such as drum sounds imitating thunder or a sledgehammer. The songs typically featured multi-sectional formal structures, following a pattern of three instrumental sections – introduction, bridge, and finale – and two vocal sections – stanza and refrain.

Enslaved, a formative band in Viking metal, performs primarily a black metal style, but has over time become more progressive. Eduardo Rivadavia described the hallmarks of Enslaved as "Viking themes, razor sharp guitars, blastbeat drums, and an ear for orchestration resulting in complex structures, bountiful harmonies and time changes." The band evolved significantly with every album since Mardraum – Beyond the Within (2000).

The Faroese band Týr has a standard rock band lineup with electric instruments, but makes extensive use of traditional Faroese music in its songs. Faroese ballads typically involve unusual time signatures, most commonly 7/4 or the alternative rhythms 12/8 or 9/8. In an attempt to replicate these uneven signatures, Týr often places the accent on the weak beat of the bar. In songs based on old Faroese ballads, Týr usually play in harmonic or melodic minor scale or else in mixolydian mode.

==== Influence from sea shanties and popular media ====
Mulvany states that "Viking metal ... is much less concerned with traditional aural materials like instruments and melodies. Instead, Viking bands limit themselves mainly to the use of Norse mythology as a textual source, which they often augment with stylized shanty-like melodies that are meant to evoke apropos images". He elaborates:

Although the majority of Viking metal bands ... limit themselves primarily to textual borrowings, many others can be additionally classified as musically evocative of the Vikings. Unlike folk metal bands drawing from other mythologies, bands using Norse mythology as text have no musical-historical examples to augment their illusion. This has led to the creation of an ahistorical 'Viking music' that is used in tandem with the metal style to conjure up appropriate images.

According to Mulvany, Viking metal draws heavily on sea shanties and media images of pirates and Vikings, an influence evident in two basic forms of the genre. The first type "is largely stepwise in motion with many repeated note figures", is frequently in minor key, and is primarily sung in unison. The second type uses an "arching ascent-descent structure" and is less dependent on lyrics, making it "more evocative of rolling waves on the open sea". As examples of the first type, Mulvany examined the structures of sea shanties such as "Drunken Sailor", the 1934 and 1996 film soundtrack versions of "Dead Man's Chest", Mario Nascimbene's "Viking" song for the 1958 film The Vikings, and the chant from Monty Python's "Spam" sketch, and found similar structures in compositions by Viking and black metal bands such as Einherjer, Mithotyn, Naglfar, and Vargevinter. The second type, that of arching ascent and descent, Mulvany noticed in compositions by Einherjer and Borknagar.

The shanty influence results from stereotyping in which certain aural associations are equated with "images of sailors, sea-borne marauders, and Vikings", and "though rooted in traditional sea shanties, these aural images have been perpetuated through the media of pirate movies and television shows, and they have been extended – by association – to Vikings". Ashby and Schofield agree with Mulvany that musically, Viking metal bands generally are unconnected with a real Viking past, but instead connote a broader sense of the maritime, presuming that "this conflation of maritime contexts is a knowing one, but one nonetheless felt to be somehow evocative."

Keith Fay of the folk metal band Cruachan has also noted the influence of sea shanties on Viking metal, although disparagingly. In an interview with British magazine Terrorizer, he said that there is "no real defined 'Viking music', so all these Nordic bands use 'sea shanty' type tunes to match their music. A lot of these bands, especially the bigger ones, are called folk metal but they don't really understand what real folk music is; though I know this is not true for all of them."

=== Thematic and lyrical focus ===
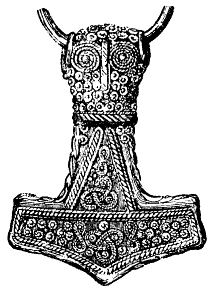
Viking metal makes extensive use of Viking iconography, such as this Mjölnir pendant.

While heavy metal throughout its history has referenced the occult, Viking metal bands use a very specific mythology, which informs their textual choices, album imagery, and, frequently, musical compositions. Thematically, Viking metal draws extensively on elements of black metal, but the lyrics and imagery are pagan and Norse rather than anti-Christian or Satanic. It combines the exaltation of violence and virility through weapons and battlefields, which is common to many death and black metal bands, with an interest in ancestral roots, particularly a pre-Christian heritage, which is expressed through Viking mythology and imagery of northern landscapes. Some bands such as Sorhin keep the Satanic elements of black metal but musically are influenced by more recent folk tunes.

==== Visuals ====
Visuals such as album art, band photos, website design, and merchandise all highlight the dark and violent outlook of Viking metal lyrics and themes. Seascapes and Viking ships are commonly invoked by Viking metal artists. For example, the cover to Blodhemn (1998) by Enslaved, which features the band as Viking warriors with their boat anchored behind them, or the cover to Dödsfärd (2003) by Månegarm, which features a stereotypical Viking funeral. The art on albums by Viking metal artists frequently depicts Viking Age archeological finds: Thor's hammers are especially common, but other artifacts such as Oseberg posts, runestones, and even the Sutton Hoo helmet have appeared (though this last artifact is neither Viking nor from the Viking age). (Note: The Sutton Hoo burial site technically is not Viking. It belongs to the East Angles, and dates to a century before the Viking Age. The site is often misconstrued to be a Viking one.) Some bands incorporate far more ancient, pre-medieval imagery, such as the Finnish band Moonsorrow's use of prehistoric rock carvings and megaliths. Other Finnish bands, such as Ensiferum, Turisas, and Korpiklaani, focus on Sámi traditions and shamanism, further stretching the definition of Viking metal. Not all bands rely on Viking-related visuals or other ancestral images to aid their musical character: for instance, the members of Týr do not wear Viking costumes on stage, and only their folk-influenced music and lyrical themes distinguish them from other heavy metal bands.

==== Lyrics ====
Despite a whole pantheon of Norse gods to choose from, Viking metal bands typically focus on Odin, the god of war, and on Thor and his hammer. Alcohol, particularly mead, is also a common lyrical focus. Viking metal bands tend to follow one of two approaches. The first is one of romanticism and escapist ideas, where bands cultivate an image of strength and barbarism and quote passages from various poems and sagas. For example, English professor Heather Lusty writes that the lyrical content of Amon Amarth is historically inaccurate and is misappropriated to glorify drinking and pillaging. The second approach emphasizes historical accuracy, typically relying on Norse mythology as the sole focus of lyricism and identity. The multi-national group Heilung include excerpts of texts from the Viking Age and broader Germanic Iron Age in their song lyrics. Many Viking metal bands identify first with local roots – for instance, Moonsorrow with Finland, Einherjer with Norway, Skálmöld with Iceland – with a wider northern European identity coming second.

Many songs are composed in English, but Viking metal bands often write lyrics in other languages, usually of the North Germanic family – Norwegian, Old Norse, Swedish, Danish and, less commonly, Icelandic and Faroese – and also in Finnish, which is non-Germanic and of the Finno-Ugric family. Other historic and contemporary European languages, such as the Germanic languages Old English, German, Old High German, Proto-Norse, Dutch, Gothic, and West Frisian, as well as Latin, Sámi languages, or Gaulish are sometimes used. (Note: For example, the German project Falkenbach, in addition to English and Old Norse, has written in German, Old High German, and Latin (this last being an Italic language. The German band Obscurity also writes lyrics in German. The lyrics of Heilung include text in Gothic, Old High German, Old English, and Proto-Norse. The Dutch band Heidevolk writes entirely in Dutch, and Fenris and Slechtvalk, also Dutch projects, have, in addition to English, written in Dutch. Slechtvalk has also recorded a song in Latin. Baldrs Draumar, from the West Frisian area of the Netherlands, write lyrics exclusively in their native West Frisian. The Finnish band Korpiklaani, when it recorded under the previous name Shaman, wrote in Sami languages, but dropped the use of these languages when it changed its name and style. The Swiss band Eluveitie writes much of its music in reconstructed Gaulish, a Celtic language.) Heavy metal fans around the world sometimes learn languages such as Norwegian or Finnish in order to understand the lyrics of their favorite bands and improve their appreciation of the music. Irina-Maria Manea considers this preference to sing in a native language, along with the imagery of album covers, and stage performances which often involve warrior costumes, weapons, and sometimes reenactments, a demonstration of a völkisch aspect to Viking metal. Specifically, the thematic focus of Viking metal bands conceptualizes ethnicity as uniform, unchanged history from "time immemorial," which is, state Manea, "precisely in the völkisch framework."

==== Paganism and opposition to Christianity ====
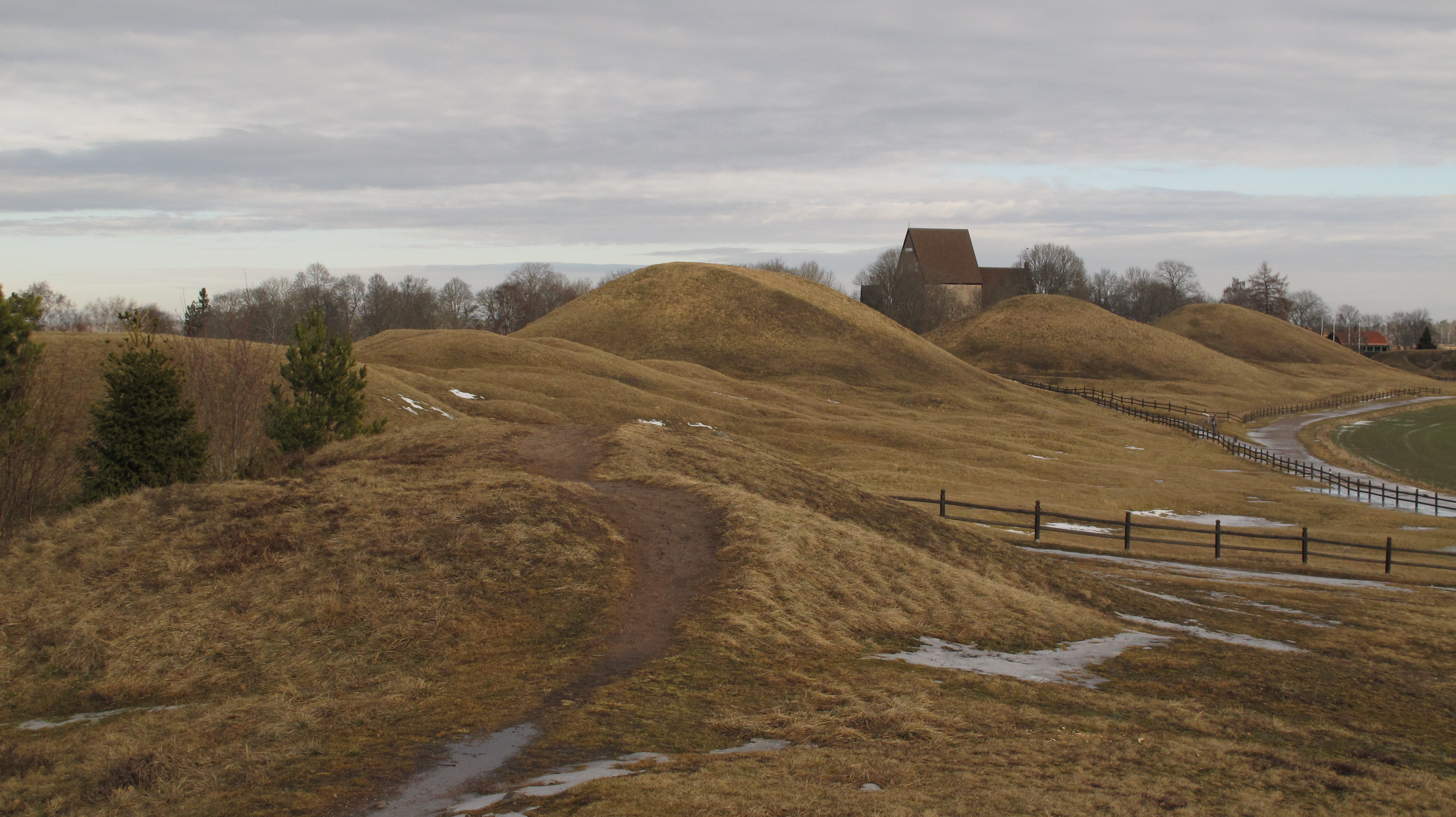
Burial mounds at Gamla Uppsala, the center of religious worship in Sweden until the destruction of its temple in the late 11th century.

The imagery in Viking metal draws upon the material culture created during the Viking Age, but — according to Trafford and Pluskowski — it also "encompasses the broad semiotic system favored by many black and death metal bands, not least of all the exultation of violence and hyper-masculinity expressed through weapons and battlefields". In Viking metal this semiotic system is melded with an interest in ancestral roots, specifically a pre-Christian heritage, "expressed visually through Viking mythology and the aesthetics of northern landscapes". Extreme and obsessive loathing of Christianity had long been the norm for black and death metal bands, but in the 1990s Bathory and many other bands began turning away from Satanism as the primary opposition to Christianity, instead placing their faith in the Vikings, Norse pantheon figures such Odin, Thor, and Loki, and trolls and beasts. Many artists claim affiliation to the modern Pagan religion of Heathenry, treating Christianity as a foreign influence that was forcibly imposed, and therefore as a wrong to be righted.

Some members of the Norwegian black metal scene were motivated to take violent action against this influence – for instance, the church burnings by black metal musicians Varg Vikernes, Samoth, Faust, and Jørn Inge Tunsberg, among others. While most bands or individuals did not go that far, an undercurrent of racism, nationalism, and anti-Semitism continues to permeate parts of the black metal scene. Many Viking metal artists, including bands such as Enslaved and Einherjer, simply express interest in Vikings and Norse mythology and entirely reject the Satanic inclination of black metal, writing almost exclusively on Norse themes, without any racist or anti-Semitic undertones. Whereas black metal during the 1990s took a militant and destructive stance toward the status quo, Viking metal looked to the past and took a populist, anti-system approach which eschewed violence. Viking metal is both pre-Christian and post-apocalyptic – it looks to a pre-Christian past and imagines a post-Christian future. While opposition to Christianity drove the formation of Viking metal, some bands that play, or have played, Viking metal, such as Slechtvalk, Drottnar, Vardøger, and Holy Blood, subscribe to Christian beliefs.

David Keevill argues that the explicitly anti-Christian attitude of most Viking metal artists is an anachronistic view of the Viking Age. Keevill explains that "while bands have used [Viking mythology] as the basis for their musical existence ... the historical reality of the Viking Age (late 8th century to the 11th century) is a chequered backdrop of a multitude of belief systems and disparate political mechanisms". As an historical example, he cites the raid on Lindisfarne in 793, an event considered the beginning of the Viking Age and celebrated by Enslaved in its song "793 (Slaget Om Lindisfarne)". He contends that this attack was merely an opportunistic raid, not a concerted attack on the growing power of Christianity, and that the terms "heathen" and "pagan" historically did not necessarily mean "anti-Christian", but that the people in question did not fit under a denominational label. Furthermore, Norse religion and Christianity intermingled and influenced each other throughout the era, and Christianity was often imposed through monarchical regimes such as Harald Klak and Harald Bluetooth or conversion movements such as those initiated by Ansgar. Keevill concludes that, "It's not that bands like Amon Amarth shouldn't flout their Norse heritage, the bellicose nature of the ancestors or the kind of practices that would have taken place in far flung tribal societies, it's just that ruling out the presence of an overbearing Christian influence on the Viking Age is incredibly close-minded."

==== Relationship to pagan metal ====
Viking metal has been considered the progenitor of the pagan metal genre, with Bathory's Hammerheart as the first pagan metal recording. Weinstein writes that "it is fitting that pagan metal began with Viking metal, given that the Vikings were Europe's last Pagans, converted slowly and with reluctance to Christianity". Imke von Helden explains some key differences: "[Pagan metal] deals mainly with Pagan religions and lies in a broader context where not only Old Norse mythology is dealt with, but also Celtic myths and history, fairy tales and other elements of folklore. Traditional instruments like the violin or flute are used more often in pagan than in Viking metal music." The idea of incorporating and revering exclusively national or regional myths, stories, and tales first took root in the work of artists such as Adorned Brood, Falkenbach, Black Messiah, Enslaved or Einherjer, but, as a musical phenomenon, has grown far beyond Europe into a global trend in which artists express their affinity with an ethnic heritage. Viking metal, along with pagan and folk metal, forms part of a trend within cultural heritage movements toward wider acceptance of the heritage of ordinary and the everyday life, not just nationally significant and the iconic imagery, and also a trend to explore the outer reaches of heritage, where the definitions of heritage and heritage communities are stretched and contested. Baldrs Drauma, a West Frisian band, stated in an interview that they "find it important that people in general (so, not only Frisians but everyone around the world) know where they come from, what their history is, who they are and what led to this point in history. We find that during this digital age, people are searching for their identity, and what better way to research that than with the awesome tunes that we provide?"

==== Masculinity, heroism, and racial identity ====
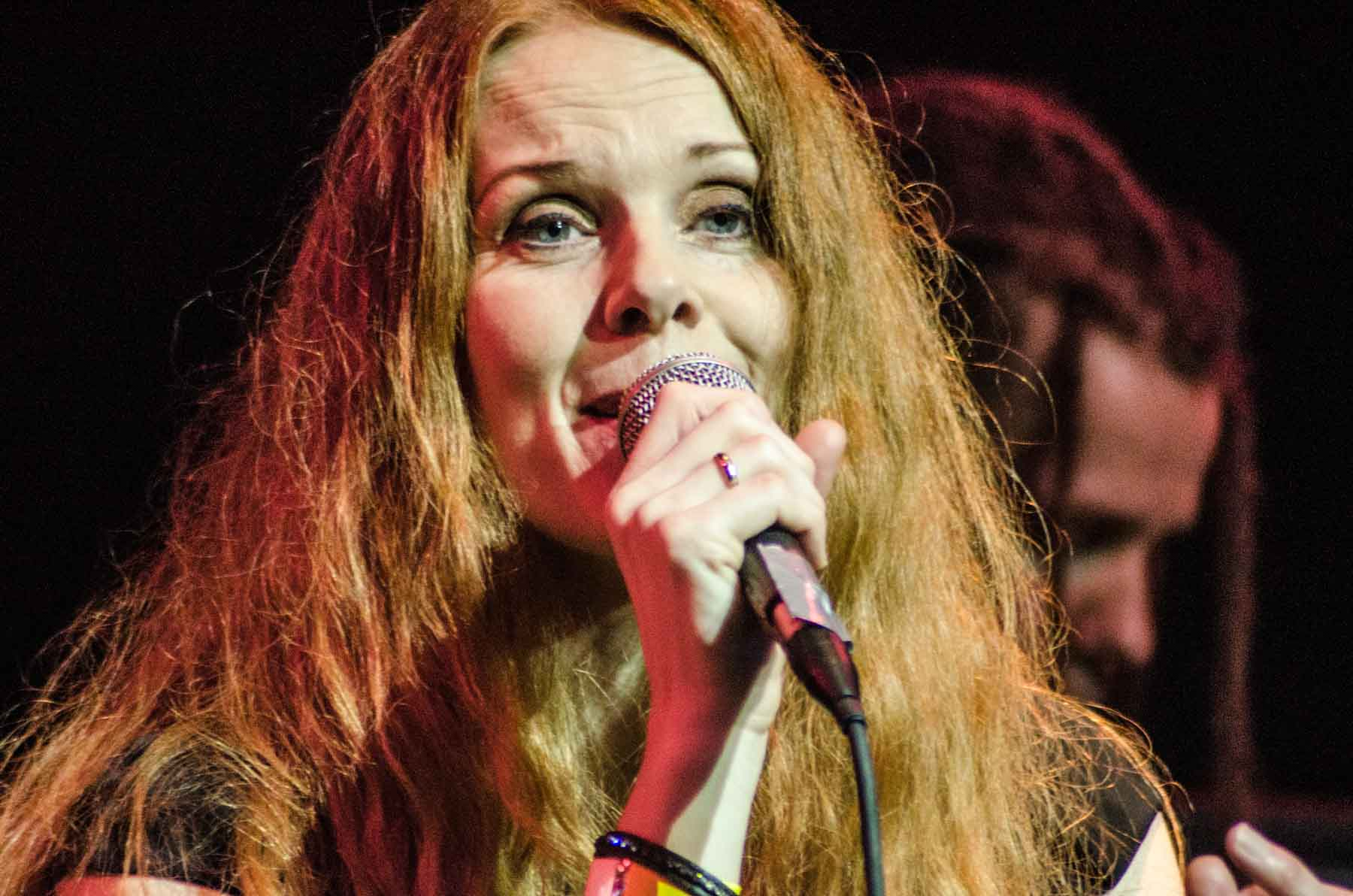
Kari Rueslåtten, formerly of Storm, and seen here with The Sirens. Women musicians are not common among Viking metal bands.

According to the music studies scholar Catherine Hoad, the Viking image in popular understanding is that of hypermasculinity, and thus Viking metal is inherently patriarchal. While some bands, such as Kivimetsän Druidi, Storm, and Irminsul, have included female members, and female fans comprise a substantial part of Viking metal's audience, it is argued that women are subordinated within the Viking metal scene, and are rarely present in the production of Viking metal music, which can be seen as a form of "nation-building": while women may participate in the nation building process, it is still controlled by men. Within Viking metal, themes of war and masculinity predominate.

Hoad also contends that black and Viking metal express whiteness through a confluence of notions of nation, nature, monstrosity, and masculinity. Per Hoad, constructions of "authentic" nationhood continue to be directly informed by conceptions of race. The ethnoromantic fantasy of Vikings and pagans as premodern people subsisting off of the land is informed by the confluence of nationalism, racialism, and masculinity. "Unknowable" land is valorized, econationalism is fiercely advocated, and wilderness is prized as simultaneously impermeable to, yet under threat, from globalization. "Authentic" Nordic whiteness is contested against what is perceived as the colonizing force of Christianity and the weakening of society via modernism. Hoad argues that "the ethnonationalism of Norwegian metal then emerges through textual representations of Norway, and Norwegian whiteness, as terrifying and discomforting; yet ancient, pure, elite and unique." Whiteness, writes Hoad, is embedded within a wider national effort of "maintaining Norwegianness in an increasingly globalised context." Hoad does not believe that this understanding of Norwegian metal means that these scenes are inherently racist or fascist, but rather acknowledges that representations of Nordic history within both metal music and broader nationalist discussions exist within a dominant structure of power which can and has been used to support the cultural hegemony of whiteness. Conversely, the ethnomusicologist Ryan Koons stresses that Viking metal has no racist connections, unlike the similarly named Viking rock that is part of a white nationalist music scene.

Some artists, such as Burzum, link manliness with Norse tradition and gender ideals, and thus see the Viking male as representing traditional masculinity. Most of the Norse references in black metal are heroic, masculine, and militaristic in theme – Mjölnir, Odin, the Iron Cross, and berserkers and einherjar. Conversely, Jesus, though a male figure, is seen in songs such as "Jesu død" by Burzum as cold, dark, and life-extinguishing. Christianity is viewed as stigmatizing and suppressing the natural "dark" sides of men, and so, from the perspective of black metal, true masculinity is achieved through exploring the dark sides of man's nature – warfare and killing. Sociologist Karl Spracklen notes that the folk music band Wardruna does not play black metal at al yet was nonetheless immediately accepted by black metal fans both because some black metal artists had transitioned from black metal to neofolk, drone, or ambient music and because Wardruna is "heroic, masculine and associated with the well-worn epic trope of Viking metal".

Cultural historian Nina Witoszec found that within Norway, images of nature are often symbolic with cultural affiliation to Norway. Witoszec traces the roots of this ideal to Tacitus's German-heathen identity narrative which romanticized the Germanic people as superior through their connection with nature, and whose brutality and belligerence opposed the apathetic and decadent Roman elite. Within black metal, Norse imagery is used to build a view of natural and authentic masculinity to counter the oppressive force of the Judeo-Christian tradition.

== History ==
=== Bathory ===
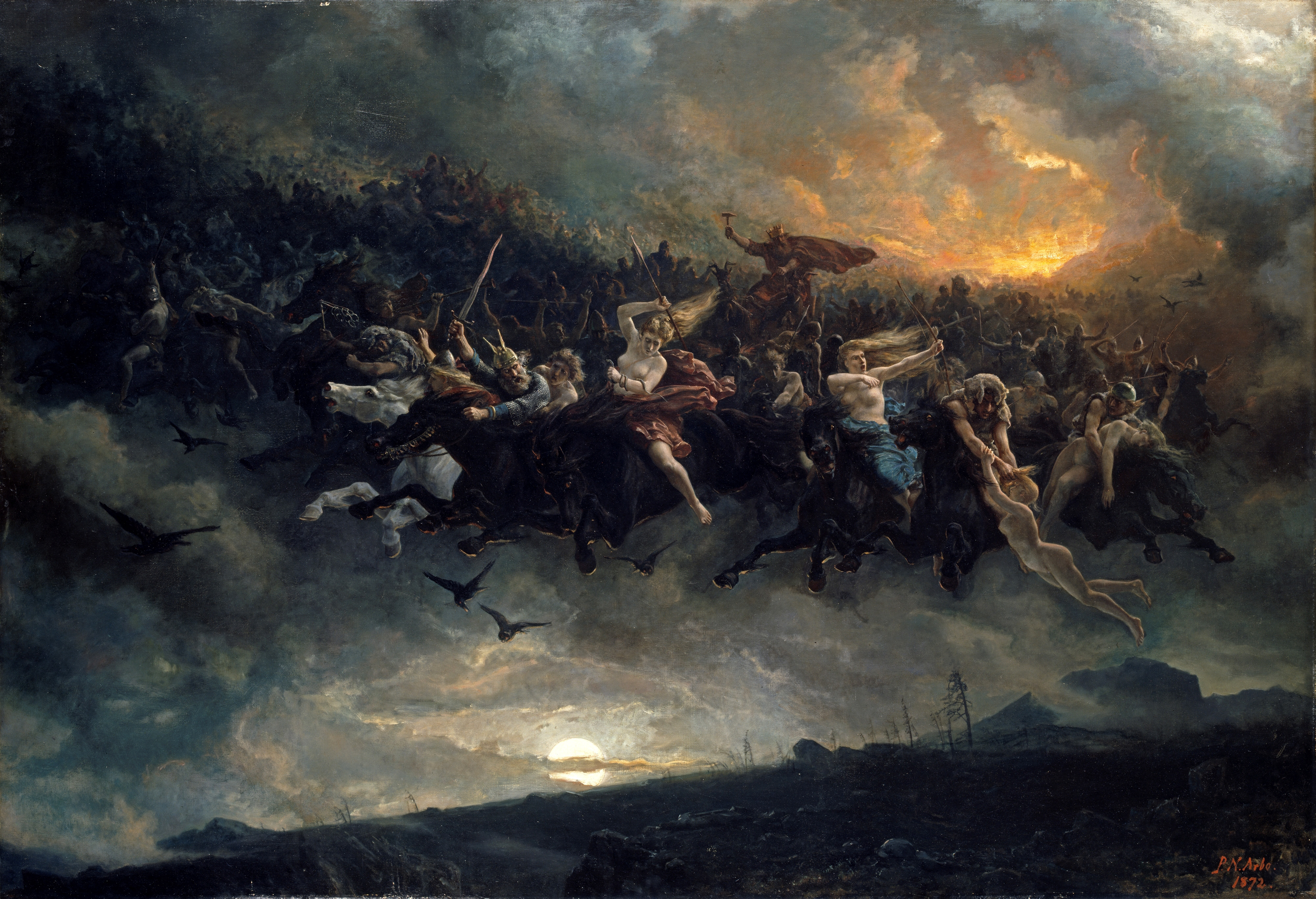
The Wild Hunt of Odin by Peter Nicolai Arbo was used as the cover for Bathory's Blood Fire Death album, considered the first example of Viking metal.

The roots of Viking metal are generally found in Scandinavian metal, particularly the death and black metal scenes of the late 1980s. Inspired by the Viking themes used by Manowar, some bands identified with the Vikings far more completely than Manowar. At the forefront of this movement stood the Swedish band Bathory, which influenced the emergence not only of Viking metal but also of folk metal, medieval folk, and neofolk. The band's fourth album Blood Fire Death, released in 1988, includes two early examples of Viking metal – the songs "A Fine Day to Die" and "Blood Fire Death". The cover to Blood Fire Death even features The Wild Hunt of Odin, a painting by Norwegian artist Peter Nicolai Arbo which depicts the Norse god Odin on a Wild Hunt. Vlad Nichols writes that while the parts of the album that were dedicated to Viking themes had more in common with Wagnerian imagination than Nordic music, the album "came closer to an intuited essence of a 'Viking feel' in music than any before". Bathory followed up on this Viking theme in 1990 with the release of Hammerheart, a concept album fully devoted to Vikings. Like its predecessor, this album features a Viking-themed painting, this time The Funeral of a Viking by Sir Frank Dicksee. Following up this release were 1991's Twilight of the Gods, titled after Wagner's opera of the same name, and Blood on Ice, recorded in 1988–1989 but released in 1996. Hammerheart is considered a landmark that introduced the metal world to the Viking metal archetype. With this album, Quorthon, the band's founder, inspired a generation of Nordic teens, and seeded a deep anti-Christian sentiment which culminated in the violence and hate crimes committed by members of the Norwegian black metal community in the early 1990s. The artistic choices by Quorthon contain völkisch elements which emphasize a return to heathen Europe rather than a "destructive" Christianity. Quorthon later explained, in the liner notes to Blood on Ice, that his shift to Viking themes was an intentional move away from Satanism:

I came to the personal conclusion that this whole Satanic bit was a fake: a hoax created by another hoax – the Christian church, the very institution they were attempting to attack using Satanic lyrics in the first place. Since I am an avid fan of history, the natural step would be to find something in history that could replace a thing like the dark side of life. And what could be more simple and natural than to pick up on the Viking era? Being Swedish and all, having a personal relation to, and linked by blood to, that era at the same time as it was an internationally infamous moment in history, I sensed that here I might just have something. Especially well suited was it since it was an era that reached its peak just before the Christian circus came around northern Europe and Sweden in the tenth century, establishing itself as the dictatorial way of life and death. And so that Satan and hell type of soup was changed for proud and strong nordsmen, shiny blades of broadswords, dragon ships and party-'til-you-puke type of living up there in the great halls.

— Quorthon, Liner notes of Blood on Ice

Bathory's Viking metal features Wagnerian-style epics, ostentatious arrangements, choruses, and ambient keyboards. Mulvany notes that Bathory's 1990s work marks the beginning of a Viking-themed trend initially slow, even confusing, in formation. For example, the Austrian black metal band Abigor incorporated Viking themes and Germanic paganism in "Unleashed Axe-Age", the first track on its 1994 album Nachthymnen, but said it "should not be seen as a part of the upcoming Viking trend". According to Mulvany, "The Viking trend presaged by Abigor was actually taking place around them, and it remains more 'true' to how black metal is often defined than the folk influenced metal that followed. Its folk elements are predominantly textual or musically evocative rather than musically-historically accurate."

=== Enslaved ===
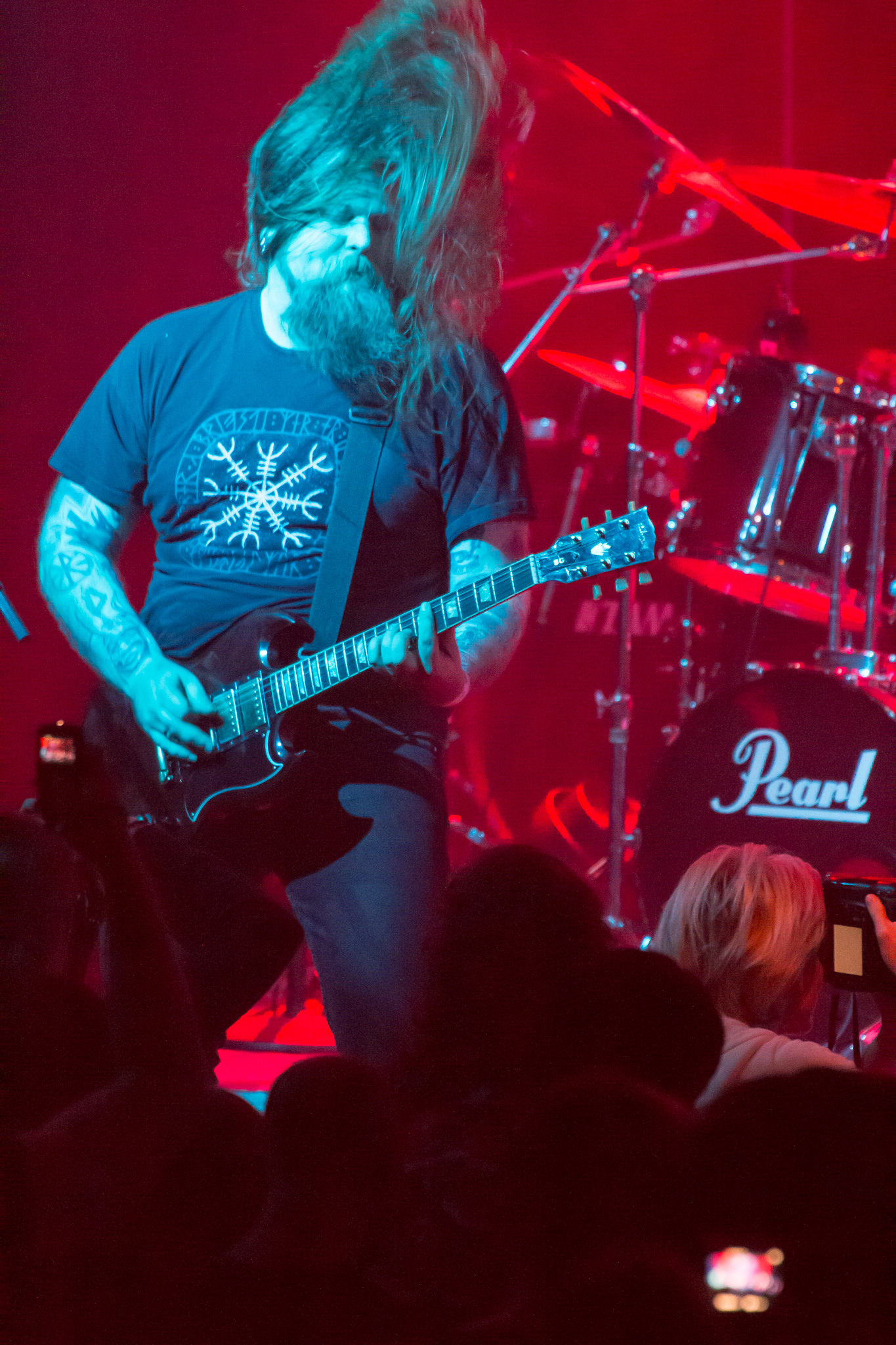
Ivar Bjørnson of Enslaved at Barge to Hell, December 2012

Enslaved, formed in Norway in 1991, has also been cited as the first truly Viking metal band, with the 1993 EP by the band, Hordanes Land, named as the first true Viking metal release. A review of Eld (1997) noted that "Among the countless bands who were inspired by Bathory's seminal Viking metal, arguably none were as true to its gospel as Norway's Enslaved, whose utmost commitment even extended to donning vintage Norse armor and outfits on-stage". The band's 1994 debut album Vikingligr Veldi had "many melodies being borrowed from ethnic Scandinavian folk music to lend additional authenticity to the vicious, fast-paced black metal". Inspired by Bathory, Enslaved set out to "create Viking metal devoted to retelling Norway's legends and traditions of old – not attacking Christianity by means of its own creation: Satan." Its second album Frost, also released in 1994, served as "an important release for the extreme music subgenre of Viking metal". Though the previous recordings by Enslaved all featured the same thematic material, Frost was the first album that Enslaved described as Viking metal. This album also defined the band's lyrical approach. Decibel explains that on Frost, bassist and vocalist Grutle Kjellson "knew it was time to reclaim the gods and goddesses of his ancestors, especially if it meant his version of things would inevitably clash with the Christianized fairytales so often associated with Nordic myth."

=== Burzum ===
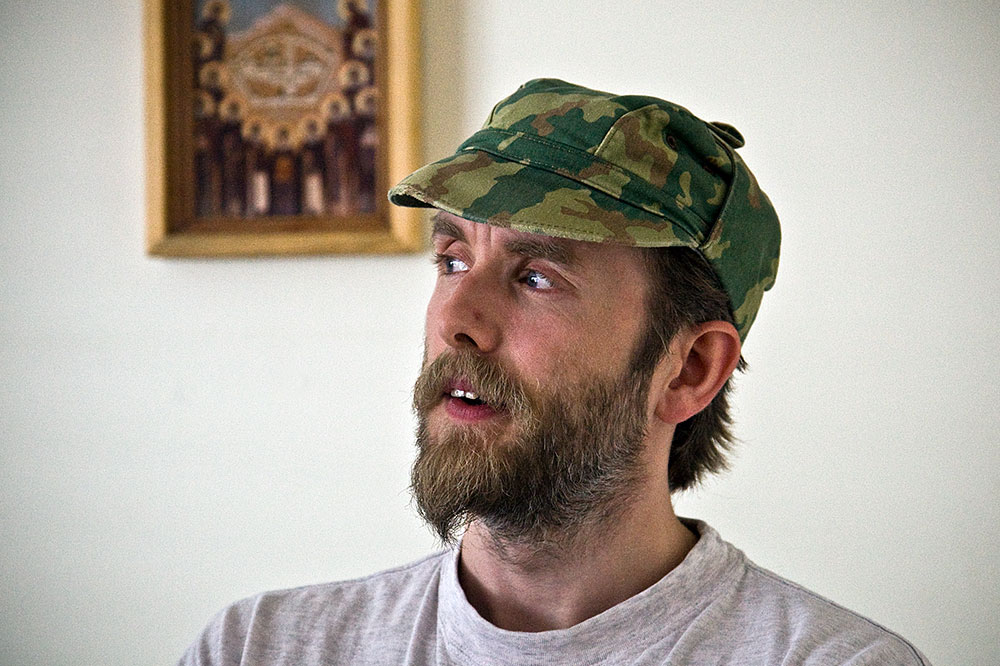
Varg Vikernes, 2009

Ideologically, Varg Vikernes's one-man project Burzum helped inspire the Viking metal scene through his strongly held racist, nationalistic, and anti-Judeo-Christian beliefs, and his longing for a return to paganism. In Trafford and Pluskowski's opinion, Vikernes' beliefs, which had culminated in the burning of several churches, including the twelfth-century Fantoft Stave Church in Bergen, reveal the confused nature of ideas about Vikings in the Norwegian black metal scene. They note, "His tastes seem originally not for the unmediated medieval itself as for J. R. R. Tolkien: he adopted the name 'Count Grishnackh', based upon an orc in The Lord of the Rings, and named Burzum after a Tolkienian word for 'darkness'." They postulate that only in retrospect did Vikernes "cloak his actions in an Oðinic garb and claim the motivation of an attempt to restore Norse paganism for his church burning". While in prison, Vikernes released the book Vargsmål, which Trafford and Pluskowski call an echoing of the Hávamál, though with "an eye on Mein Kampf". According to Trafford and Pluskowski, "proving both that it is not just the early medieval past to which he looks for inspiration, and that he will use any historical weapon at his disposal to offend Norwegian liberal opinion, it is notable that he has recently added the name Quisling to his own, and is even attempting to claim some sort of kinship to the wartime collaborator".

Vikernes himself has connected the church burnings to an idea of resurgent Viking paganism. The first such burning, that of Fantoft Church on June 6, 1992, was thought by many to be related to Satanism, since the burning occurred on the sixth day of the week, on day six of the sixth month and was thus a reference to the Number of the Beast. Vikernes contends that the date June 6 was really picked because the first recorded Viking raid (upon Lindisfarne) occurred, according to Vikernes, on June 6, 793. (Note: The raid actually occurred on June 8, 793, not June 6. The annals of the Anglo-Saxon Chronicle state that the raid occurred the six days before the ides of June, which were on the 13th, which would place the date at June 8 rather than 6. Vikernes did state, "According to other sources it was the 8th of June ...") Quorthon acknowledged that nationalist elements had always been present in the Viking metal scene, and, in the early 1990s, these elements hardened into explicit racism and anti-Semitism, particularly among Heathen adherents. By the late 1990s, Viking metal pulled back from the neo-Nazi direction toward which it was headed, once many musicians from the Oslo scene died or were jailed.

=== Other pioneers ===
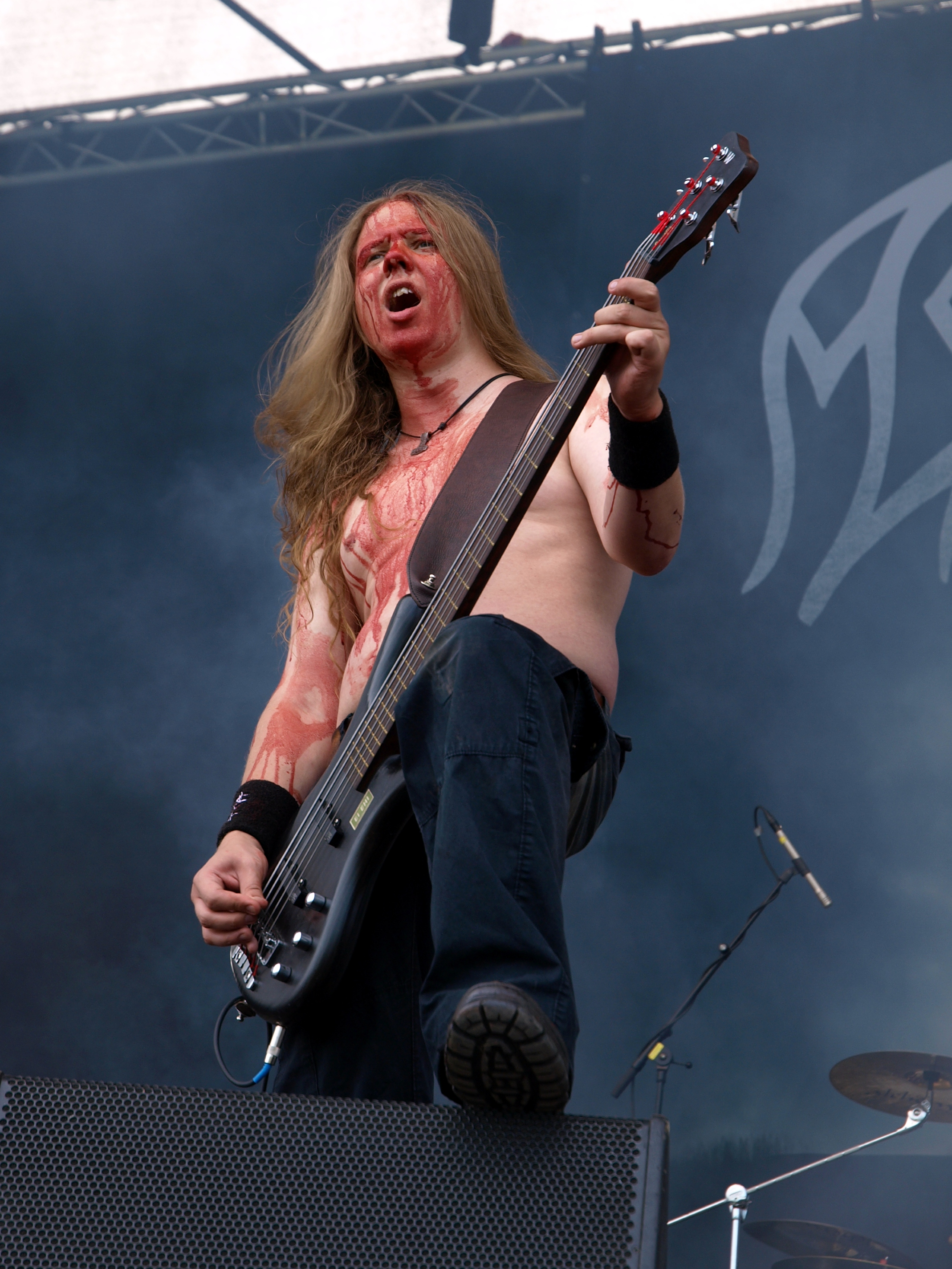
Ville Sorvali, co-founder of the Viking metal band Moonsorrow

Besides Bathory, Enslaved, and Burzum, several other artists are credited as pioneers of the style. The original bassist for Emperor, Håvard Ellefsen, also known as Mortiis, was "an indispensable force in the genesis of Norway's epic Viking metal sound." Despite Ellefsen's short tenure in the band, it was his musical interests that catalyzed the band to mix chaotic black metal with synthesizer melodies based on Norwegian folk music.

Helheim was another major pioneer in the early scene. Helheim emerged on the scene before other bands such as Einherjer and Thyrfing, when even Enslaved was in its infancy. Not only was Helheim one of the first bands to meld black metal with Viking themed-music, but one of the first to include stylistically unconventional instruments such as horns and violins. Robert Müller of Metal Hammer Germany argues that Viking metal never solidified as a genre, and attributes this to Jormundgand, Helheim's 1995 debut album. Jormundgand included an ambitious track – "Galder" – but that song was considered incompatible with metal, and audiences, looking for a specific musical style, merged with the pagan metal scene, which had no particular "Viking" identity.

Other highly influential Viking metal bands are Borknagar, Darkwoods My Betrothed, Einherjer, Ensiferum, Moonsorrow, Thyrfing, and Windir. Trafford and Pluskowski regard Einherjer, Moonsorrow, Thyrfing, and Windir as the "most influential" Viking metal bands, with Einherjer's album covers, which include many images of Viking artifacts, giving Einherjer the most Viking feel of all bands except Enslaved. Einherjer's artwork spans the full chronology of Viking art: 8th- and 9th-century Oseberg to 11th- and 12th-century Urnes. (Note: Specifically, the EPs Leve Vikingånden and Far Far North use a Mjölnir pendant, Dragons of the North depicts a carved post from the Oseberg ship burial, and Blot includes part of a harness bow in the Jelling Style. More complex is the artwork for Odin Owns Ye All, which, in the style of a fire-lit wooden carving, portrays a representation of the one-eyed god and his two watchful ravens, surrounded by ornamentation similar to the tendrils and animals found on the Urnes stave church carvings.)

=== Amon Amarth and Unleashed ===
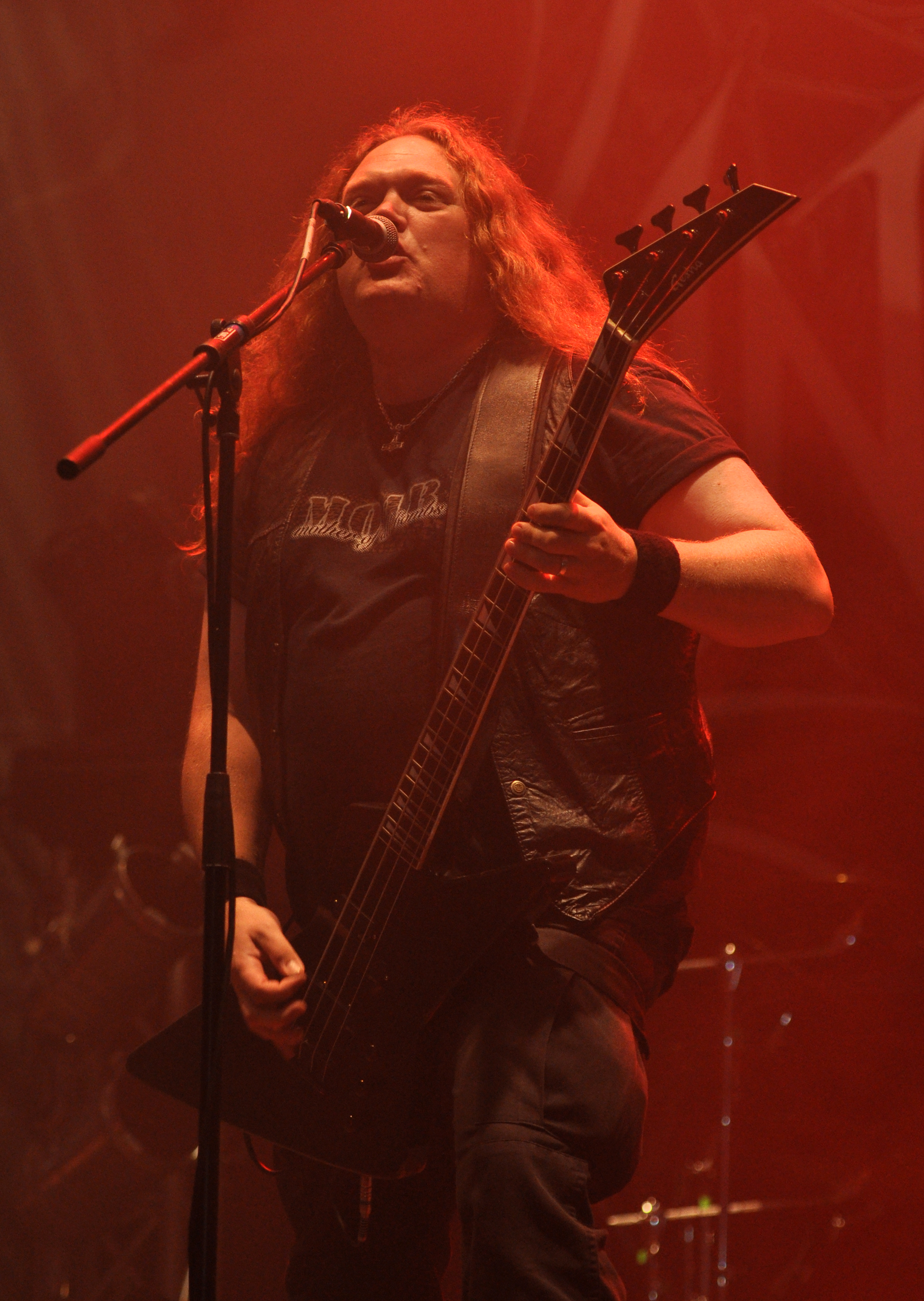
Johnny Hedlund of Unleashed, performing at Party.San Metal Open Air, 2013

Amon Amarth and Unleashed's music could be described as death metal, but it incorporates Viking lyrical themes and thus the bands are considered to have broadened the scope of Viking metal. While Norse myths were mostly important for black metal, especially the early 1990s Norwegian scene, as well as for the younger pagan metal genre, bands as the Swedish Unleashed started fitting these myths into death metal even before Amon Amarth appeared. Unleashed set a precedent for many of the coming black metal bands by shying away from the common death metal theme of gore and instead focusing on pre-Christian Swedish heathenism, particularly the Viking Age and old Norse religion. Amon Amarth and Unleashed resist the Viking metal label. Amon Amarth claims that they are merely a melodic death metal band with Viking-inspired lyrics. Johan Hegg from that band stated, "It's weird to label a band after the lyrical content because, in that case, Iron Maiden is a Viking metal band, Black Sabbath is a Viking metal band, Led Zeppelin is a Viking metal band." Johnny Hedlund of Unleashed maintains that the band has always played and always will play death metal, commenting, "The Viking lyrics you will find on about three to five songs on every Unleashed album from 1991 and on. I don't think that fact alone re-defines our style in some way."

=== Spread outside the Nordic countries ===
Some members of the Viking metal scene believe that it is impossible for someone to be a Viking unless they themselves are of northern European descent. According to Trafford and Pluskowski, the members of practically all Viking metal bands claim Viking ancestry, and after its inception in Scandinavia, Viking metal spread to areas historically settled by Vikings, including England, Russia, and Normandy. Viking metal bands have even formed in the United States and Canada, with their members claiming Viking descent either directly from Scandinavia or through England. The scene also spread to other parts of Northern Europe in areas united by a common Germanic heritage, such as Austria, Germany, and the Netherlands. For instance, the Austrian band Valhalla makes extensive use of Viking iconography, including horned helmets. Another Austrian example is Amestigon, which on the cover of its promotional album Remembering Ancient Origins depicts a wood carved scene of Sigurd killing Regin, an image taken from a panel held in Hylestad Stave Church.

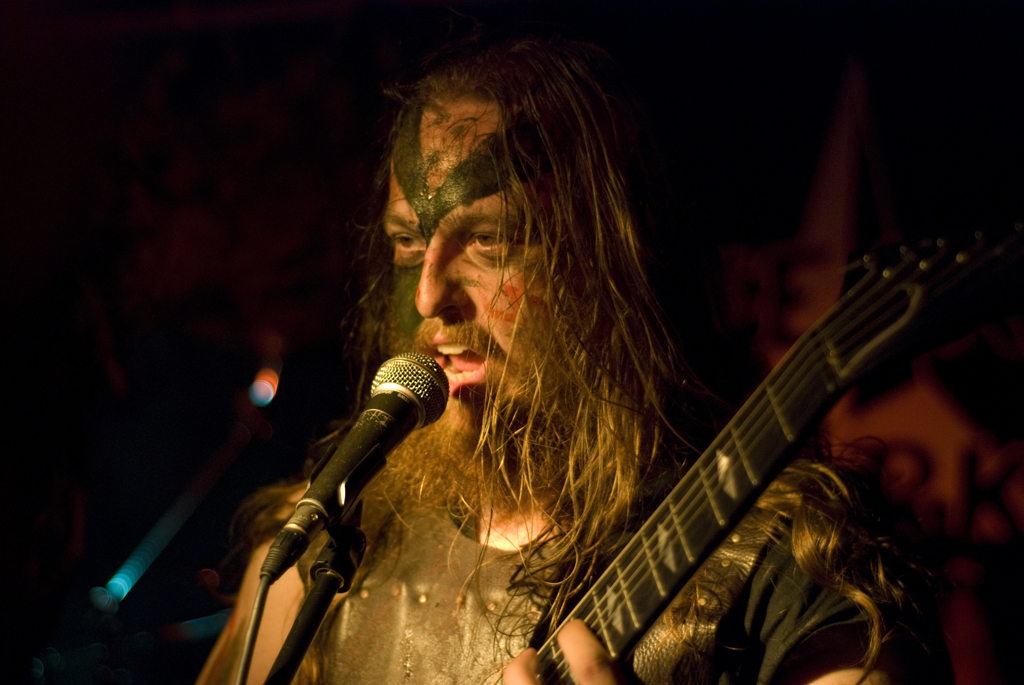
Shamgar of the Dutch band Slechtvalk, 2008

One of the first non-Nordic Viking metal bands was the German project Falkenbach. Formed in 1989 and primarily the work of front-man Vratyas Vakyas, Falkenbach performs a mixture of black metal and folk music, with lyrics drawing from Western and Northern European mythologies, religions, and folk traditions. The Dutch bands Heidevolk, Slechtvalk, and Fenris have also been labeled as Viking metal, though Heidevolk's former vocalist Joris Boghtdrincker claims that Heidevolk has never tried to "play the Viking card or the Pan-Germanic card", instead choosing to write about local Dutch history. The Swiss band Eluveitie has been referred to as "Celtic Viking metal" and the band itself jokingly calls its music "the new wave of folk metal". Vocalist Chrigel Glanzmann explains was because the "whole folk metal thing was still quite new back then, and the scene and the music press was looking for new labels for that kind of music, so they came up with Forest Metal, Viking Metal, Heathen Metal, Pagan Metal, blah blah blah, and we just felt like it was really really ridiculous."

Catherine Hoad finds the issue of national and racial identity central to Viking metal. For instance, she writes that when Trafford and Pluskowski claim that Manowar could not claim religious or racial identity with the Vikings when the band had a bandleader with the "'less than wholly Scandinavian name of Joey di Maio', [Trafford and Pluskowski] are approaching a more complex and racially-charged issue than their offhandedness would suggest." While Viking imagery may be readily appropriated, according to Hoad the definition of a "true" Viking is quite rigid, a rigidity which non-Nordic, and especially non-White, musicians must contend with. As an example, she cites the Brazilian band Viking Throne, which claims legitimacy through European ancestry and historical references to explorations of South America by Nordic countries, and quotes their front-man, Count Nidhogg: "Some people understand perfectly that it doesn't matter where you live, what's really important is your heritage and ancestry. Even living in a South American country as Brazil we all have European blood." Hoad argues that Viking Throne illustrates the cultural importance of claiming Viking ancestry, a culture that operates on largely geographic lines. In contrast to Viking Throne, she cites the band Slechtvalk, which is well known for its brand of Christian Viking metal, but is rarely criticized as inauthentic by the scene. (Note: However, in 2010, an appearance by Slechtvalk was canceled after Enslaved, which was also scheduled for the same show, told the venue that it refused to play with a band with religious or political intentions. Slechtvalk later claimed that this was a misunderstanding on Enslaved's part, and that Enslaved told Slechtvalk that it did not know about the cancellation.) Hoad speculates that the European ethnicity of the band is enough to compensate for its otherwise counter-intuitive music.

=== Influence on pagan metal and modern pagan movements ===
The German literary scholar Stefanie von Schnurbein list Viking metal as one of the many influences on Heathenry and popular images of Nordic myth and religion, influences that have even shaped academic discourse on Nordic myth. According to Weinstein, "Viking metal has travelled further than any Viking ship. Self-defined pagan metal bands who describe their music as Viking metal can be found in the United States, Brazil and Uruguay, among other places." The sensationalism of the early Norwegian black metal scene might be responsible for some of this popularity, but Weinstein considers the genre's greatest influence to be "the inspiration it has given to others to explore their own roots". This impact was particularly strong in the Baltic states, where Viking metal influenced the development of a distinct pagan metal scene known as "Baltic war metal". The Lithuanian band Obtest, formed as a black metal band in 1993 with Lithuanian lyrics, birthed the war metal scene with the 1997 album Tūkstantmetis. Michael F. Strmiska comments that despite the claim that Scandinavia was home to the last pagans in Europe, within the scene: "A point of particular pride is the knowledge that Lithuania was the last country in all of Europe to officially abandon its native Pagan traditions and convert to Christianity in 1387." Another Baltic band influenced by Viking metal is the Latvian project Skyforger, which composes its lyrics in the Latvian language. A third example of the influence of Viking metal on pagan metal is the national socialist black metal band Graveland from Poland, which on its second album, Thousand Swords, released in 1995, featured a variety of folk styles mixed in with the band's black metal sound, and introduced lyrics about Polish history and Slavic gods. Viking metal has also influenced the Russian Rodnoverie movement, particularly the texts of Varg Vikernes, many of which have been translated into Russian. Though some of his readers within Rodnoverie distance themselves from the racism and political statements within Vikernes' work, other followers have embraced racist and National Socialist ideas. More broadly, metal music, especially, pagan and Viking metal have helped introduce the movement to new followers. Contemporaneous to the rise of Viking metal has been the emergence of Celtic metal in Ireland, France, and even Germany, a style which sounds essentially like Viking metal, apart from the addition of harps, but with lyrics celebrating Celtic gods and myths.

== See also ==
- List of Viking metal bands
- Viking rock
- Medieval metal
- Neo-Medieval music
- Norse mythology in popular culture
- Neo-medievalism

== Notes and references ==
=== References ===
- Aitamurto, Kaarina (2011). "Modern Pagan Warriors: Violence and Justice in Rodnoverie". In Lewis, James R. (ed.). Violence and New Religious Movements. Oxford: Oxford University Press. pp. 231–248. ISBN 978-0-19-973563-1.
- Aitamurto, Kaarina (2016). Paganism, Traditionalism, Nationalism: Narratives of Russian Rodnoverie. Milton Park and New York: Routledge. ISBN 978-1-317-08443-3.
- "Scandinavian Metal Overview". AllMusic.
- Anderson, Jason. "Frost". AllMusic.
- Andrew, J. (September 1, 2015). "Origins of Evil: The Birth of Extreme Metal". Metal Injection.net.
- Angelique (February 13, 2005). "Korpiklaani Interview". Metal Storm. Ivan Suslin.
- Anttonen, Veikko (2012). "Literary Representation of Oral Religion: Organizing Principles in Mikael Agricola's List of Mythological Agents in Late Medieval Finland". In Raudvere, Catharina; Schjødt, Jens Peter (eds.). More Than Mythology: Narratives, Ritual Practices and Regional Distribution in Pre-Christian Scandinavian Religions. Lund: Nordic Academic Press. pp. 185–224. ISBN 978-91-85509-71-3.
- Armstrong, Marian, ed. (2002). Peoples of Europe. Singapore: Marshall Cavendish. ISBN 978-0-7614-7378-7.
- Ashby, Steven P.; Schofield, John (2015). Smith, Laurajane (ed.). "'Hold the Heathen Hammer High': representation, re-enactment and the construction of 'Pagan' heritage". International Journal of Heritage Studies. 21 (5): 493–511. doi:10.1080/13527258.2014.960441. ISSN 1470-3610. S2CID 162335765 – via Academia.edu.
- Beyazoğlu, Ïbrahim (2009). "Prismatics of Music and Culture: The Equivocation of Nordic Metal". In Wall, John (ed.). Music, Metamorphosis and Capitalism: Self, Poetics and Politics. Newcastle: Cambridge Scholars Publishing. pp. 50–63. ISBN 978-1-4438-0799-9.
- Bowar, Chad (February 12, 2011). "Falkenbach Interview – A Conversation with Vratyas Vakyas". About Entertainment. IAC. Archived from the original on May 27, 2011.
- Bowar, Chad (August 5, 2014). "Falkenbach – Heralding: The Fireblade". About Entertainment. IAC. Archived from the original on January 11, 2016.
- Bowar, Chad (October 8, 2015). "Falkenbach Interview". About Entertainment. IAC. Archived from the original on June 23, 2009.
- Campbell, Sophie (July 28, 2009). "Sutton Hoo, Suffolk: On the trail of the Anglo-Saxons". The Daily Telegraph.
- Carver, Martin (1998). Sutton Hoo: Burial Ground of Kings?. Philadelphia: University of Pennsylvania. ISBN 978-0-8122-3455-8.
- Campion, Chris (February 20, 2005). "In the Face of Death". The Guardian.
- Combe, James (2022-10-26). "Highway to...Valhalla? The contemporary sound of Viking music". The Viking Herald.
- Couper, Alastair (2015). The Geography of Sea Transport. Abingdon-on-Thames: Routledge. ISBN 978-1-317-35150-4.
- Dare, Tom (December 28, 2014). "There's more to folk metal than warpaint and the hurdy gurdy". Metal Hammer. Teamrock.
- DaRonco, Mike. "Einherjer". AllMusic.
- "Enslaved – "Frost"". Decibel. Red Flag Media. February 13, 2010.
- Dieters, Frank (July–August 2006). "Eluveitie - Spirit". Lords of Metal (61). Archived from the original on 4 January 2017.
- Dome, Michael (2007). Murder Music: Black Metal (motion picture). Rockworld TV.
- Ekeroth, Daniel (2009). Swedish Death Metal (2nd ed.). Brooklyn: Bazillion Points Books. ISBN 978-0-9796163-1-0.
- Ferrier, Rob. "Bathory". AllMusic.
- Freeborn, Robert (June 2010). Anderson, Rick (ed.). "A Selective Discography of Scandinavian Heavy Metal Music". Notes. 66 (4): 840–850. doi:10.1353/not.0.0340. S2CID 192140924. Archived version available (archived on March 31, 2012) – via A-R Editions.
- Harris, Craig. "Darkwoods My Betrothed". AllMusic.
- Heesch, Florian (2010). "'Metal for Nordic Men': Amon Amarth's Representations of Vikings". In Scott, Niall W. R. (ed.). The Metal Void (PDF). Oxford. pp. 71–80. ISBN 978-1-904710-87-5. Archived from the original (PDF) on 2014-10-28.
- Gjerde, Hege Skalleberg; Bergstøl, Jostein (2021). "Sami Vikings?". In Aannestad, Hanne Lovise; Pedersen, Unn; Moen, Marianne; Naumann, Elise; Berg, Heidi Lund (eds.). Vikings Across Boundaries: Viking-Age Transformations – Volume II. Abingdon and New York: Routledge. pp. 2108–2120. ISBN 978-1-000-20472-8.
- Gustin, Ingrid; Wessman, Anna (2021). "Western Finland in the Viking World". In Aannestad, Hanne Lovise; Pedersen, Unn; Moen, Marianne; Naumann, Elise; Berg, Heidi Lund (eds.). Vikings Across Boundaries: Viking-Age Transformations – Volume II. Abingdon and New York: Routledge. pp. 2003–2021. ISBN 978-1-000-20472-8.
- Hagen, Russ (December 27, 2011). "Black Metal". In Wallach, Jeremy; Berger, Harris B.; Greene, Paul D. (eds.). Metal Rules the Globe: Heavy Metal Music Around the World. Durham, North Carolina: Duke University Press. pp. 180–199. ISBN 978-0-8223-4733-0.
- von Helden, Imke (2010). "Barbarians and Literature: Viking Metal and its Links to Old Norse Mythology". In Scott, Niall W.R. (ed.). The Metal Void (PDF). Oxford. pp. 257–263. ISBN 978-1-904710-87-5. Archived from the original (PDF) on 2014-10-28.
- von Helden, Imke (2023). "9: Viking Metal: Obsessed with the Past?". In Herbst, Jan-Peter (ed.). The Cambridge Companion to Metal Music. Cambridge: Cambridge University Press. pp. 114–127. ISBN 9781108997911.
- Hoad, Catherine (2013). "'Hold the Heathen Hammer High': Viking Metal from the Local to the Global". In Wilson, Oli; Attfield, Sarah (eds.). Shifting Sounds: Musical Flow – A Collection of Papers from the 2012 IASPM Australia/New Zealand Conference. Dunedin. pp. 62–70. ISBN 978-0-9757747-9-3 – via Academia.edu.
- Hoad, Catherine (2021-10-25). Heavy Metal Music, Texts, and Nationhood: (Re)sounding Whiteness. Cham, Switzerland: Springer Nature. ISBN 978-3-030-67619-3.
- Hofstra, Tette; Samplonius, Kees (1995). "Viking Expansion Northwards: Mediaeval Sources" (PDF). Arctic. 48 (3): 235–247. doi:10.14430/arctic1245. ISSN 0004-0843 – via University of Groningen.
- Hopkins, Pandora (2013a). "Iceland". The Concise Garland Encyclopedia of World Music, Volume 1. Abingdon-on-Thames: Routledge. pp. 507–510. ISBN 978-1-136-09562-7.
- Hopkins, Pandora (2013b). "Norway". The Concise Garland Encyclopedia of World Music, Volume 1. Abingdon-on-Thames: Routledge. pp. 511–515. ISBN 978-1-136-09562-7.
- Huey, Steve. "Marching Out". AllMusic.
- Huey, Steve. "Enslaved". AllMusic.
- Huey, Steve. "Burzum". AllMusic.
- Huey, Steve. "Mortiis". AllMusic.
- Jakobsen, Hanne (July 17, 2013). "Old Arabic texts describe dirty Vikings". ScienceNordic. Archived from the original on August 26, 2019.
- James, Edward (March 29, 2011). "Overview: The Vikings, 800 to 1066". BBC.
- Jensma, Goffe (2018). "10: Remystifying Frisia: The 'experience economy' along the Wadden Sea coast". In Egberts, Linde; Schroor, Meindert (eds.). Waddenland Outstanding: History, Landscape and Cultural Heritage of the Wadden Sea Region. pp. 162–163. doi:10.2307/j.ctv7xbrmk.13 – via ResearchGate.
- Jonsson, Johannes (November 13, 2011). "Vardoger – Whitefrozen". Metal For Jesus!. Johannes Jonsson.
- Kahn-Harris, Keith (December 1, 2007). Extreme Metal: Music and Culture on the Edge. Oxford: Berg Publishers. ISBN 978-1-84520-399-3.
- Kahn-Harris, Keith (December 27, 2011). "'You Are from Israel and That Is Enough to Hate You Forever': Racism, Globalization, and Play within the Global Extreme Metal Scene". In Wallach, Jeremy; Berger, Harris B.; Greene, Paul D. (eds.). Metal Rules the Globe: Heavy Metal Music Around the World. Durham, North Carolina: Duke University Press. pp. 200–226. ISBN 978-0-8223-4733-0.
- Kalis, Quentin (August 31, 2004). "CoC : Rant : Black Metal: A Brief Guide". Chronicles of Chaos. Archived from the original on August 31, 2011.
- Kasekamp, Andres (2010). A History of the Baltic States. London: Palgrave Macmillan. ISBN 978-0-230-36451-6.
- Keevill, David (March 8, 2012). "Viking Metal and Christianity: A Most Misunderstood Relationship". Thrash Hits. Archived from the original on December 17, 2015.
- Kendrick, T. D. (2012). A History of the Vikings. Mineola: Dover Publications. ISBN 978-0-486-12342-4.
- Koons, Ryan (2019-02-26). "Sweden: Modern and Contemporary Performance Practice". In Sturman, Janet (ed.). The SAGE International Encyclopedia of Music and Culture. Thousand Oaks, California, United States: SAGE Publications. pp. 2114–2119. ISBN 978-1-4833-1774-8.
- Krgin, Borivoj (October 30, 2006). "Unleashed Frontman: 'We Have Always Been a Death Metal Band'". Blabbermouth.net.
- Lach, Stef (December 4, 2014). "Amon Amarth: Don't call us viking metal". Metal Hammer. TeamRock.
- "Helheim". Laut.de (in German). Seitenbau.
- Lee, Cosmo (November 8, 2006). "Amon Amarth – With Oden on Our Side". Stylus Magazine. Todd Burns. Archived from the original on November 12, 2006.
- Lee, Cosmo; Voegtlin, Stewart (January 9, 2006). "Into the Void: Stylus Magazine's Beginner's Guide to Metal". Stylus Magazine. Archived from the original on September 9, 2006.
- Leistö, Timo (2013). "Finland". The Concise Garland Encyclopedia of World Music, Volume 1. Abingdon-on-Thames: Routledge. p. 523. ISBN 978-1-136-09562-7.
- Ling, Jan (1997). A History of European Folk Music. Rochester: University of Rochester Press. ISBN 978-1-878822-77-2.
- Ling, Jan; Kjellberg, Erik; Ronström, Owe (2013). "Sweden". The Concise Garland Encyclopedia of World Music, Volume 1. Abingdon-on-Thames: Routledge. pp. 516–518. ISBN 978-1-136-09562-7.
- Nichols, Vlad (September 26, 2019). "The Beginner's Guide to Evolution of Viking Metal". Ultimate Guitar.
- Lovgren, Stefan (February 17, 2004). "Vikings' Barbaric Bad Rap Beginning to Fade". National Geographic News. Archived from the original on 2 April 2004.
- Lusty, Heather (2020-01-23). "Heavy Metal Microgenres". In Stevens, Anne H.; O’Donnell, Molly C. (eds.). The Microgenre: A Quick Look at Small Culture. New York: Bloomsbury Publishing USA. pp. 163–169. ISBN 978-1-5013-4583-8.
- Manea, Irina-Maria (April 16, 2015). "Primal Roots: Ancestry and Race in Extreme Music Discourses". Proceedings of IAC-SSaH 2015: International Academic Conference on Social Sciences and Humanities in Prague 2015. Czech Institute of Academic Education z.s. pp. 185–193. ISBN 978-80-905791-2-5.
- McIntosh, Christopher (2019-05-01). Beyond the North Wind: The Fall and Rise of the Mystic North. Newburyport: Weiser Books. ISBN 978-1-63341-090-9.
- Metal Marc; Flex187; xRTx; Heidendoder (November 13, 2002). "An interview with... Slechtvalk". Art for the Ears. MPO.
- Moberg, Marcus (2015). Christian Metal: History, Ideology, Scene. London: Bloomsbury Publishing. ISBN 978-1-4725-7986-7.
- Mørk, Gry (2011). "Why Didn't the Churches Begin to Burn a Thousand Years Earlier?". In Thomas Bossius, Thomas; Häger, Andreas; Kahn-Harris, Keith (eds.). Religion and Popular Music in Europe: New Expressions of Sacred and Secular Identity. Studier av Inter-Religiösa Relationer. London: I.B. Tauris. pp. 124–144. ISBN 978-1-84885-809-1. ISSN 1650-8718.
- Moynihan, Michael; Søderlind, Didrik (2003). Lords of Chaos: The Bloody Rise of the Satanic Metal Underground (revised ed.). Port Townsend, Washington: Feral House. ISBN 978-0-922915-94-1.
- Mulch, Nathan (December 17, 2014). "Chrigel Glanzmann | Eluveitie". KUOI-FM. University of Idaho.
- Müller, Robert (April 2011). "Das Phantom mit dem Hörnerhelm". Metal Hammer Germany (in German). Axel Springer Mediahouse Berlin. p. 39. Archived from the original on November 17, 2015.
- Mulvany, Aaron Patrick (May 2000). 'Reawakening Pride Once Lost': Indigeneity and European Folk Metal (MA dissertation). Wesleyan University. OCLC 49197642.
- Neithan (September 2010). Vonberg, Horst (ed.). "Interview – Slechtvalk". Lords of Metal (106).
- Nordberg, Andreas (2012). "Continuity, Change and Regional Variation in Old Norse Religion". In Raudvere, Catharina; Schjødt, Jens Peter (eds.). More Than Mythology: Narratives, Ritual Practices and Regional Distribution in Pre-Christian Scandinavian Religions. Lund: Nordic Academic Press. pp. 119–152. ISBN 978-91-85509-71-3.
- Norden Folk (n.d.). "The Music and Musical Instruments of Scandinavia". VisitNordenFolk.org. Archived from the original on November 24, 2020.
- O'Donoghue, Heather (September 30, 2008). From Asgard to Valhalla: The Remarkable History of the Norse Myths. New York: I.B. Tauris. ISBN 978-0-85773-043-5.
- Patterson, Dayal (2013). Black Metal: Evolution of the Cult. Port Townsend: Feral House. ISBN 978-1-936239-76-4.
- Peterson, Gary Dean (2016). Vikings and Goths: A History of Ancient and Medieval Sweden. Jefferson: McFarland & Company. ISBN 978-1-4766-2434-1.
- Piotrowska, Anna G. (2015). "Scandinavian Heavy Metal as an Intertextual Play with Norse Mythology". In Wilson, Scott A. (ed.). Music at the Extremes: Essays on Sounds Outside the Mainstream. Jefferson: McFarland & Company. pp. 101–114. ISBN 978-1-4766-2006-0.
- Ponton, Jared (December 24, 2010). "Review: Obscurity – Tenkterra". Sputnikmusic. Jeremy Ferwerda.
- Popoff, Martin (2003). "Immigrant Song". The Top 500 Heavy Metal Songs of All Time. ECW Press. ISBN 978-1-55022-530-3.
- Pugh, Tison; Weisl, Angela (2012). Medievalisms: Making the Past in the Present. Routledge. ISBN 978-1-136-26540-2.
- Randel, Don Michael (2003). Harvard Dictionary of Music. Cambridge, Massachusetts: Harvard University Press. ISBN 978-0-674-01163-2.
- Rivadavia, Eduardo (2018-08-03). "10 Songs That Led to Viking Metal". Loudwire.
- Rivadavia, Eduardo. "Stronger Than Evil". AllMusic.
- Rivadavia, Eduardo. "Blood Fire Death". AllMusic.
- Rivadavia, Eduardo. "Hammerheart". AllMusic.
- Rivadavia, Eduardo. "Requiem". AllMusic.
- Rivadavia, Eduardo. "Vikingligr Veldi". AllMusic.
- Rivadavia, Eduardo. "Eld". AllMusic.
- Rivadavia, Eduardo. "Blodhemn". AllMusic.
- Rossi, Juhana; Jervell, Ellen (June 4, 2013). "To Understand Hevibändi, It Helps to Know the Language: Heavy-Metal Fans Inspired to Study Finnish, Norwegian; 'Poetic and Obscure'". The Wall Street Journal.
- S., Mike. "Interview: Falkenbach". Deadtide.com. Archived from the original on 2008-01-11.
- Schnurbein, Stefanie von (2016-01-12). Norse Revival: Transformations of Germanic Neopaganism. Leiden: BRILL. ISBN 978-90-04-30951-7.
- Seigfried, Karl E. H. (June 5, 2013). "Interview With Joris Boghtdrincker of Heidevolk, Part One". The Norse Mythology.
- Sharpe-Young, Garry (2007). Metal: The Definitive Guide. London: Jawbone Press. ISBN 978-1-906002-01-5.
- Sherry, James; Aldis, Neil (2006). Heavy Metal Thunder: Kick-Ass Cover Art from Kick-Ass Albums. San Francisco: Chronicle Books. ISBN 978-0-8118-5353-8.
- Sjåvik, Jan (2010). The A to Z of Norway. Lanham and Plymouth: Scarecrow Press. ISBN 978-1-4616-7206-7.
- Slechtvalk (2000). De Verdrongen Tekenen (musical song) (in Dutch). Netherlands: Fear Dark Records.
- Spracklen, Karl (2020-05-11). Metal Music and the Re-imagining of Masculinity, Place, Race and Nation. Bingley: Emerald Group Publishing. ISBN 978-1-83867-445-8.
- Stöver, Frank (1997). "Falkenbach". Voices from the Darkside (10).
- Strmiska, Michael; Dundzila, Vilius Rudra (2005). "Romuva: Lithuanian Paganism in Lithuania and America". In Strmiska, Michael F. (ed.). Modern Paganism in World Cultures. Santa Barbara: ABC-CLIO. p. 241. ISBN 978-1-85109-608-4.
- Sulaiman, Ann; Yardley, Miranda (December 13, 2010). "Ann S. Presents – An Interview with Keith Fay (Cruachan)". Terrorizer. Dark Arts.
- Swanton, Michael (1998). The Anglo-Saxon Chronicle. New York: Psychology Press. ISBN 978-0-415-92129-9.
- Thrashboy (February 18, 2014). "Interview with 'Fedor Buzilevich' of 'Holy Blood'". Mauce.nl. The Metal Resource.
- Trafford, Simon; Pluskowski, Aleks (2007). "Antichrist Superstars: The Vikings in Hard Rock and Heavy Metal". In Marshall, David W. (ed.). Mass Market Medieval: Essays on the Middle Ages in Popular Culture. McFarland & Company. pp. 57–73. ISBN 978-0-7864-2922-6. Archived from the original on 2022-01-03 – via Academia.edu.
- Trafford, Simon (2013). "Blood, Fire, Death: Bathory and the Birth of Viking Metal". In Goodall, Mark (ed.). Gathering of the Tribe: Music and Heavy Conscious Creation. London: Headpress. pp. 302–308. ISBN 978-1-900486-85-9.
- Ulrika (March 1, 2014). "Fenris". SwedenMetal.nu (in Dutch). Christer Holm. Archived from the original on March 4, 2016.
- Unger, Matthew Peter (2016a). "Contingency and the Symbolic Experience of Christian Extreme Metal". In Reily, Suzel Ana; Dueck, Jonathan (eds.). The Oxford Handbook of Music and World Christianities. Oxford: Oxford University Press. ISBN 978-0-19-985999-3.
- Unger, Matthew Peter (2016b). Sound, Symbol, Sociality: The Aesthetic Experience of Extreme Metal Music. London: Springer Nature. ISBN 978-1-137-47835-1.
- Weinstein, Deena (December 27, 2011). "The Globalization of Metal". In Wallach, Jeremy; Berger, Harris B.; Greene, Paul D. (eds.). Metal Rules the Globe: Heavy Metal Music Around the World. Durham, North Carolina: Duke University Press. pp. 34–62. ISBN 978-0-8223-4733-0.
- Weinstein, Deena (October 20, 2014). "Pagan metal". In Weston, Donna; Bennet, Andy (eds.). Pop Pagans: Paganism and Popular Music. London: Routledge. pp. 58–75. ISBN 978-1-317-54665-8.
- Williams, Gareth (February 17, 2011). "Viking Religion". BBC.
- Yoell, John H. (1974). The Nordic Sound: Explorations Into the Music of Denmark, Norway, Sweden. Boston: Crescendo Publishing Company. ISBN 978-0-87597-090-5.
- Zed, Natalie (2012). "Heidevolk – Batavi Review". About Entertainment. IAC. Archived from the original on September 24, 2015.
