= Old Mornings Dawn =

Studio album by Summoning
- Released: June 5, 2013
- Recorded: 2012–2013
- Studio: Nachtschattenstudio
- Genre: Atmospheric black metal
- Length: 64:27
- Label: Napalm
- Producer: Summoning

Summoning chronology
Oath Bound (2006)	Old Mornings Dawn (2013)	With Doom We Come (2018)

Old Mornings Dawn is the seventh full-length album by the Austrian atmospheric black metal band Summoning. The album was released on June 5, 2013, through Napalm Records. The cover art is based on George Hetzel's painting, Rocky Gorge. Silenius commented on the album's title: "Old Mornings Dawn is no concept album, but this time we mostly experienced the stories and legends of Eärendil the mariner: half man half eldar, ancestor of the kings of Númenor, with the Silmaril of his forehead he became an immortal star. 4 songs are dealing with this topic. The lyrics of another two songs come from the poems City of Present Sorrow and Town of Dreams, two very old poems by J. R. R. Tolkien written at a time when the first world war was raging. The rest of the lyrics came from unknown writers or are written by myself and as ever are closely woven to the Tolkien universe".

== Background ==
Old Mornings Dawn was released seven years after their previous full-length album Oath Bound, which is the longest gap between any Summoning albums. Silenius explained that the delay was because "for many years I simply was completely empty and had no ideas at all for Summoning. Somehow I thought everything was said and I could not find any new aspects for this band. Later I concentrated on working on the third Kreuzweg Ost CD, that cost me another year, and after that a [heart attack] knocked me out for another half a year, but somehow all this brought me to a point where I got hungry again and since then I concentrated again on making riffs."

== Musical style, writing, composition ==
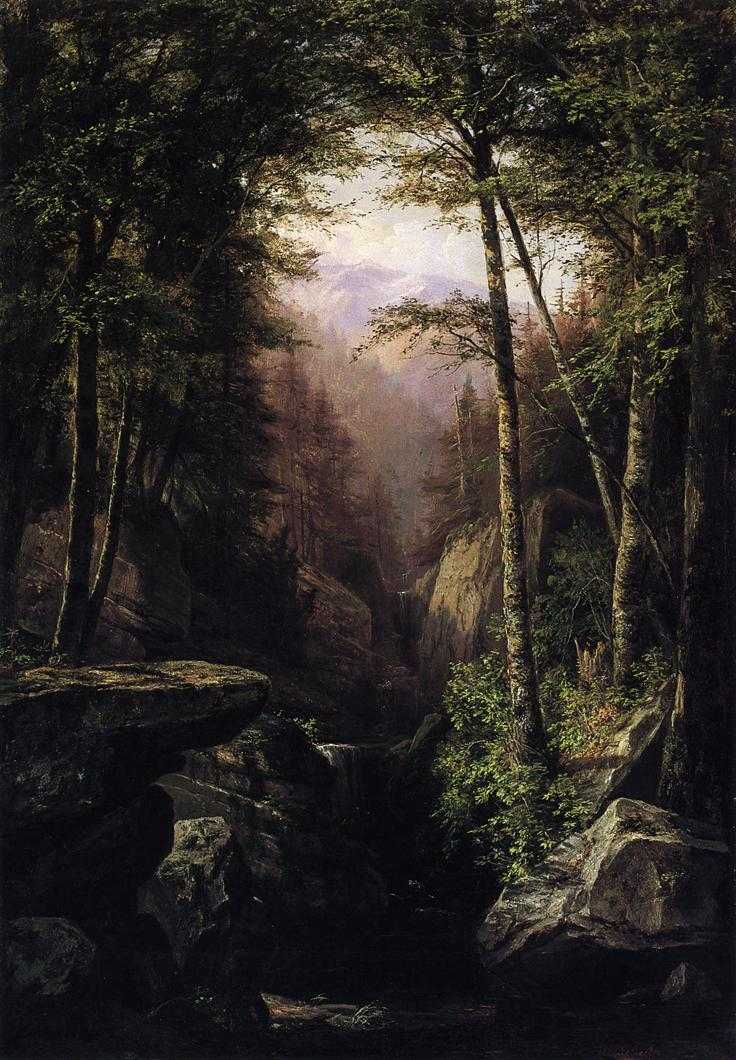
George Hetzel's Rocky Gorge (1869), used in the album's cover art

With two bonus tracks contained by the box-set and vinyl versions, this album is Summoning's longest album to date. According to band-member Protector, "I also think the new album is much darker than the ones before. I think the greater darkness comes from the deeper and more direct guitar-sound which is also more black metal styled than on the albums before. But it's also more polyphonic with more details (specially in the rhythm), due to that higher complexity we also reduced the reverb in order to make the sound more clear compared to Oath Bound." Silenius explained that the writing process differed to previous albums, and that "while Protector already made songs and riffs a short time after Oath Bound was released, it took me many years until I got motivated again, and the turning point definitely was my heart attack." Silenius believes that the heart attack he suffered caused him to reassess his priorities in life, and regained his creative inspiration. The writing was also different compared to previous albums, with Protector saying that "while in the past (since Stronghold) each song was started by Silenius while I added additional melodies to it and let it grow into one big song, this time there are songs that I started (like the title track that I created during the long time of inactivity of Silenius), while Silenius later continued to work on it."

Silenius explained in an interview that the lyrics play no role in the overall composition of Summoning's music, and are the last stage in their creative process. He added that this is less of a problem for Summoning than for other bands, due to the fact that "all our songs have to fit to the Tolkien universe and so we know how the atmosphere of a song has to sound. of course for other bands with different lyrical concepts it's a lot harder to compose fitting music for their concepts." He also explained that the band write very little of the lyrics themselves aside from the choir vocals, and that most are drawn from Tolkien's literature, or the poems of other authors which the band feel will suit the overall concept.

== Recording, mixing, production ==
The entire album was produced, mixed, and mastered by band-members Silenius and Protector. Protector explained that the band do this to maintain total creative control over their music, and to reduce financial dependence on their record label, adding that "we like to have our music totally under control and don't want that it gets manipulated by some external mixer who rather would give our albums a more mainstream metal sound. The sound of the album takes for us as long as the composing and we always try to sound different." The mixing of the album happened in several stages, as Silenius was unhappy with the original mix, so the band adjusted the mix to make the "guitars deeper and changed other things. so this time the mixing took longer than normal and we thought more about the sound than ever before." The band have criticised the production styles of other black metal records as being "over-the-top produced Hollywood black metal", and Protector added that "For some while I was mixing alone on a song, and the sound became more like this above-mentioned “hollywood” sound – more clean and sterile. But because of Silenius’ disgusted reaction, I reverted the sound back to a rougher sound!"

== Critical reception ==
Professional ratings
Review scores
Source	Rating
Exclaim!	8/10 stars
Metal Storm	9/10
Pitchfork Media	6.9/10
Ultimate Guitar	6.3/10

The album received positive reviews from music critics. Writing for Pitchfork, Kim Kelly gave a positive assessment of the album. She wrote that "There’s a sweeping cinematic feel to the proceedings" and that "the diverse and beautifully orchestrated songwriting on this album speaks for itself. Old Mornings Dawn is a more than worthy addition to their canon, and a wholly satisfying treat for fans who’ve been waiting nearly a decade for the next adventure." Exclaim's Tyler Munro likewise gave a positive assessment of the album, describing it as "their grandest accomplishment yet." He praised the band's use of keyboards and synthesized instruments as well as the album's production, writing that the album "matches grandiosity with poise, groove and the occasional emotional gut-punch." Ultimate Guitar were more critical of the album. In particular, they criticised the production in a number of areas, including the guitar and drum tones, as well as the lack of prominence given to the bass in the album's mix, and the use of programmed drums. They also criticised the album as "tedious", writing that "The songs written are like large jigsaws, but all the pieces are the same colour with slightly different shades and all the pieces are perfect squares." LA Weekly named it the 10th best metal album of 2013, writing that "The duo's Tolkien-inspired musings take dark, musical journeys to Middle Earth."

== Track listing ==
All music is composed by Summoning.

No.	Title	Length
1.	"Evernight" (instrumental)	2:48
2.	"Flammifer"	7:07
3.	"Old Mornings Dawn"	9:29
4.	"The White Tower"	9:35
5.	"Caradhras"	9:31
6.	"Of Pale White Morns and Darkened Eves"	8:22
7.	"The Wandering Fire"	8:02
8.	"Earthshine"	9:33
Total length:		64:27

Bonus tracks
No.	Title	Length
9.	"The Darkening of Valinor" (instrumental)	4:04
10.	"With Fire and Sword"	6:46
Total length:		75:17

== Personnel ==
- Protector – guitars, keyboards, drum programming, vocals on 4, 7, 8 and 10, backing vocals on 3
- Silenius – keyboards, bass, vocals on 2, 3, 5 and 6
- Erika Szűcs – backing vocals on 1 and 4
- David Says – spoken words on 3 and 8

== Chart positions ==
Chart (2013)	Peak position
Belgian Albums (Ultratop Wallonia)	193
Finnish Albums (Suomen virallinen lista)	24
German Albums (Offizielle Top 100)	98
Swedish Albums (Sverigetopplistan)	51
Swiss Albums (Schweizer Hitparade)	99
