= With Doom We Come =

Studio album by Summoning
- Released: 5 January 2018
- Studio: Nachtschattenstudio
- Genre: Atmospheric black metal
- Length: 64:58
- Label: Napalm
- Producer: Summoning

Summoning chronology
Old Mornings Dawn (2013)	With Doom We Come (2018)

With Doom We Come is the eighth full-length album by the Austrian atmospheric black metal band Summoning. The album was released on 5 January 2018, through Napalm Records. The cover art is based on Georg Janny's painting, The Dragon's cave (1917). The songs are inspired by the literature of J. R. R. Tolkien, with the title of the album being spoken by Treebeard as the Ents march on Isengard in The Two Towers.

== Track listing ==
All music is composed by Summoning.

No.	Title	Length
1.	"Tar-Calion"	7:15
2.	"Silvertine"	8:53
3.	"Carcharoth"	9:19
4.	"Herumor"	7:08
5.	"Barrow-downs" (instrumental)	2:47
6.	"Night Fell Behind"	7:20
7.	"Mirklands"	10:59
8.	"With Doom I Come"	11:17
Total length:		64:58

== Personnel ==
- Protector – guitars, drum programming, vocals on 3, 6 and 8, backing vocals on 4 and 8
- Silenius – keyboards, vocals on 2, 4, and 7, backing vocals on 4 and 8
- Erika Szűcs – backing vocals on 4 and 8

== Lyrical references ==
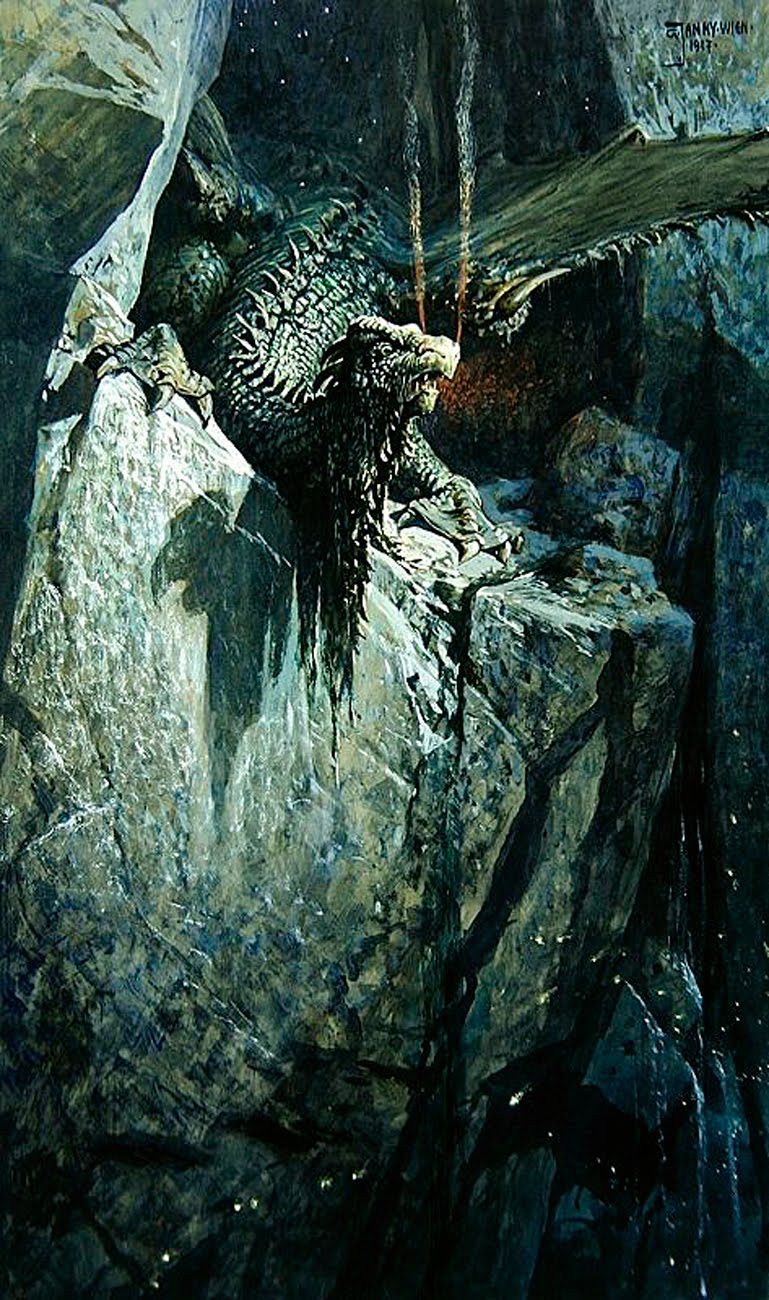
Georg Janny's The Dragon's Cave (1917), used in the album's cover art

- "Tar-Calion" uses vocal samples from the first episode of the animated series Thor & Loki: Blood Brothers (2011).
- "Silvertine" is the modified version of William Wordsworth's poem "The Thorn".
- "Carcharoth" and "With Doom I Come" both are taken from J. R. R. Tolkien's poem "The Lay of Leithian".
- "Herumor" is taken from Edgar Allan Poe's poem "Alone" and the poem "Into the Unknown" by Kim Jones.
- "Night Fell Behind" is taken from William Motherwell's poem "The Cavalier's Song".
- "Mirklands" is taken from Ralph Waldo Emerson's poem "Good-bye".

== Charts ==
Chart (2018)	Peak position
Austrian Albums (Ö3 Austria)	36
Finnish Albums (Suomen virallinen lista)	29
German Albums (Offizielle Top 100)	17
Swiss Albums (Schweizer Hitparade)	61
