= Oath Bound =

Studio album by Summoning
- Released: March 31, 2006
- Genre: Atmospheric black metal
- Length: 69:08
- Languages: English, Black Speech
- Label: Napalm
- Producer: Summoning

Summoning chronology
Let Mortal Heroes Sing Your Fame (2001)	Oath Bound (2006)	Old Mornings Dawn (2013)

Professional ratings
Review scores
Source	Rating
AllMusic	3.5/5 stars
Exclaim!	Positive
Chronicles of Chaos	9/10
Metal.de	10/10
Scream Magazine	4/6 stars

Oath Bound is the sixth full-length album by Summoning. Not counting certain pieces from the soundtrack of The Lord of the Rings, "Mirdautas Vras" is the first song ever to be written entirely in the Black Speech of Mordor. The songs "Might and Glory" and "Land of the Dead" both feature a self-sung choir chorus similar to that which was used on the Let Mortal Heroes Sing Your Fame song "Farewell". Being 21 seconds longer than Dol Guldur, this album was Summoning's longest release before the release of the version of Old Mornings Dawn containing bonus tracks. It also contains the band's longest song, Land of the Dead.

== Track listing ==
All songs written by Protector and Silenius, except where noted.

No.	Title	Length
1.	"Bauglir"	2:58
2.	"Across the Streaming Tide"	10:20
3.	"Mirdautas Vras" ("A Good Day to Kill") (Protector, Silenius, Stefan Huber)	8:13
4.	"Might and Glory"	8:26
5.	"Beleriand"	9:27
6.	"Northward"	8:39
7.	"Menegroth"	8:12
8.	"Land of the Dead"	12:50
Total length:		69:08

== Notes ==
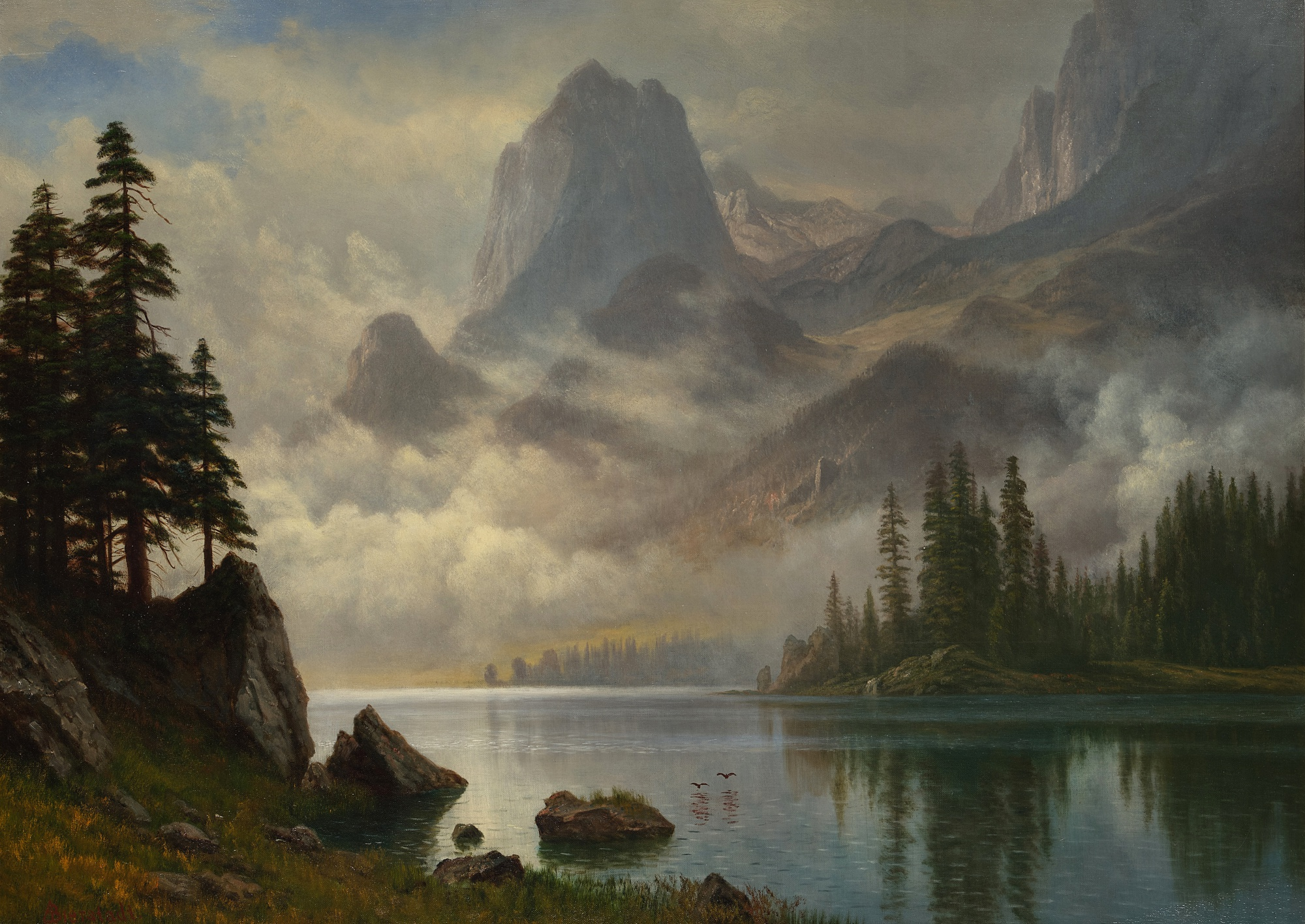
Mountain Out of the Mist by Albert Bierstadt, depicted in the album cover.

- The name Oath Bound refers to the Oath of Fëanor, in keeping with the album's Silmarillion theme.
- The album cover, as well as pages in the booklet, were made from paintings by German-American painter Albert Bierstadt.
- A mini-CD was supposed to be released in 2007 containing at least one song that was cut from Oath Bound to keep the album length under 70 minutes.

== Credits ==
- Protector - guitars, drum sounds, vocals on 2, 4 and 8
- Silenius - keyboards, vocals on 3, 5, 6 and 7

== Production ==
- Arranged & Produced By Summoning
- Recorded & Engineered By Protector
