= Amestigon =

Austrian black metal band

Amestigon is one of Austria's oldest black metal bands. It was founded in 1993 by Tharen (also of Dargaard and Dominion III) and Thurisaz. Both were part of black metal band Abigor, members of which contribute as guest musicians on Amestigon releases.

== History ==
The band recorded the demos Mysterious Realms and Through The Ages We Preserve.... onto cassette format. They signed to Napalm Records and released a split CD, also titled Mysterious Realms, with folk metal band Angizia in 1996.

The band experienced difficulties maintaining a constant line-up. After releasing the mini-CD Höllentanz in 1997, the band split, ending their relationship with Napalm Records as well.

Tharen formed neoclassical band Dargaard and industrial band Dominion III. In 1998, he reformed Amestigon. Guitarist Herr Wolf agreed to join the band in winter 1998. Silenius (vocals) and Lanz (guitar and bass) completed the line-up with Tharen on drums and keyboards. Thurisaz left the band to take over vocals and bass for Abigor.

The band released the promotional CD Remembering Ancient Origins in 2000. It collected previously unreleased songs from 1995 to 1999. It was limited to 100 copies and was self-released. The album is out of print.

The band's most recent release was the Nebelung, 1384 split CD with Hellbound in 2002, through Millennium Metal Music. At that time, there were no news on future releases, except a piece on their official site that mentioned two new mini-CD projects.

Tharen commented that the band might end. He claimed that the band had not had contact in a while, and were not working on new material. He claimed to be in communication with Thurisaz, and a new line-up might be announced.

In 2009, the full-length Sun of all Suns was released.

== Members ==
=== Current line-up ===
- Tharen – drums, keyboard, vocals (1993-)
- Silenius – vocals (1998-)
- Lanz – bass, guitar (1998-)
- Herr Wolf – guitar (1998-)

=== Past members ===
- Thurisaz – bass, guitar (1993–1997)

== Discography ==
=== Demos ===
- Mysterious Realms – 1993 – demo
- Through the Ages We Preserve... – 1993 – demo

=== Splits ===
- Mysterious Realms (split with Angizia) – 1996
- Nebelung, 1384 (split with Hellbound) – 2002

=== EPs ===
- Höllentanz – 1997
- Remembering Ancient Origins – 2000

=== Album ===
- Sun of All Suns – 2009
- Thier – 2015
