= Formosa (band) =

German hard rock band

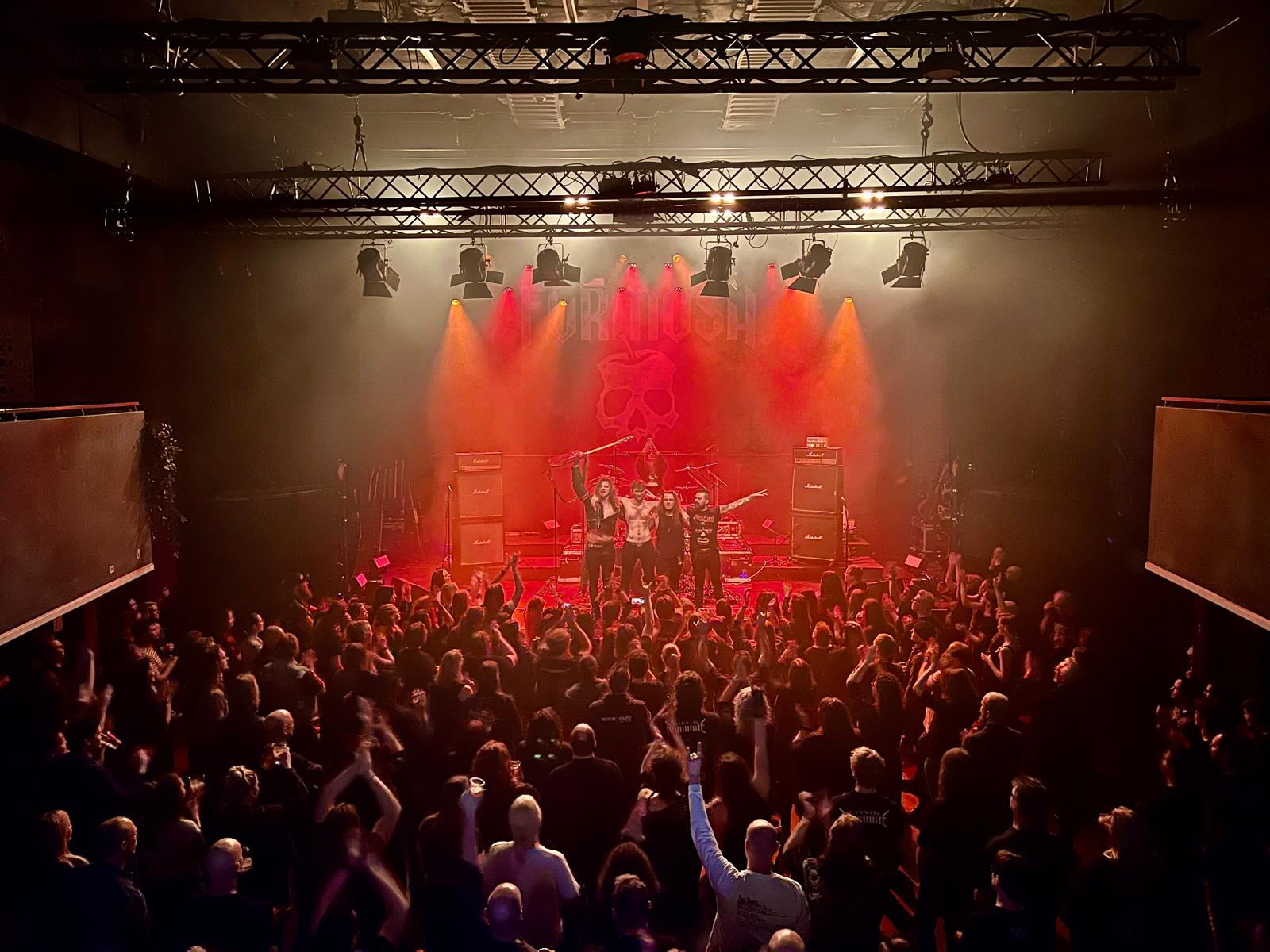
- Formosa in Enschede 2023

Background information
- Origin: Essen, Germany
- Genre: Hard rock
- Years active: 2015–present
- Labels: Sweepland Records; Metalville Records
- Members: Nik Beer; Nik Bird; Paris Jay; Lukas Bierbrauer
- Website: formosaband.com

Formosa is a German hard rock band, formed in 2015.

== History ==
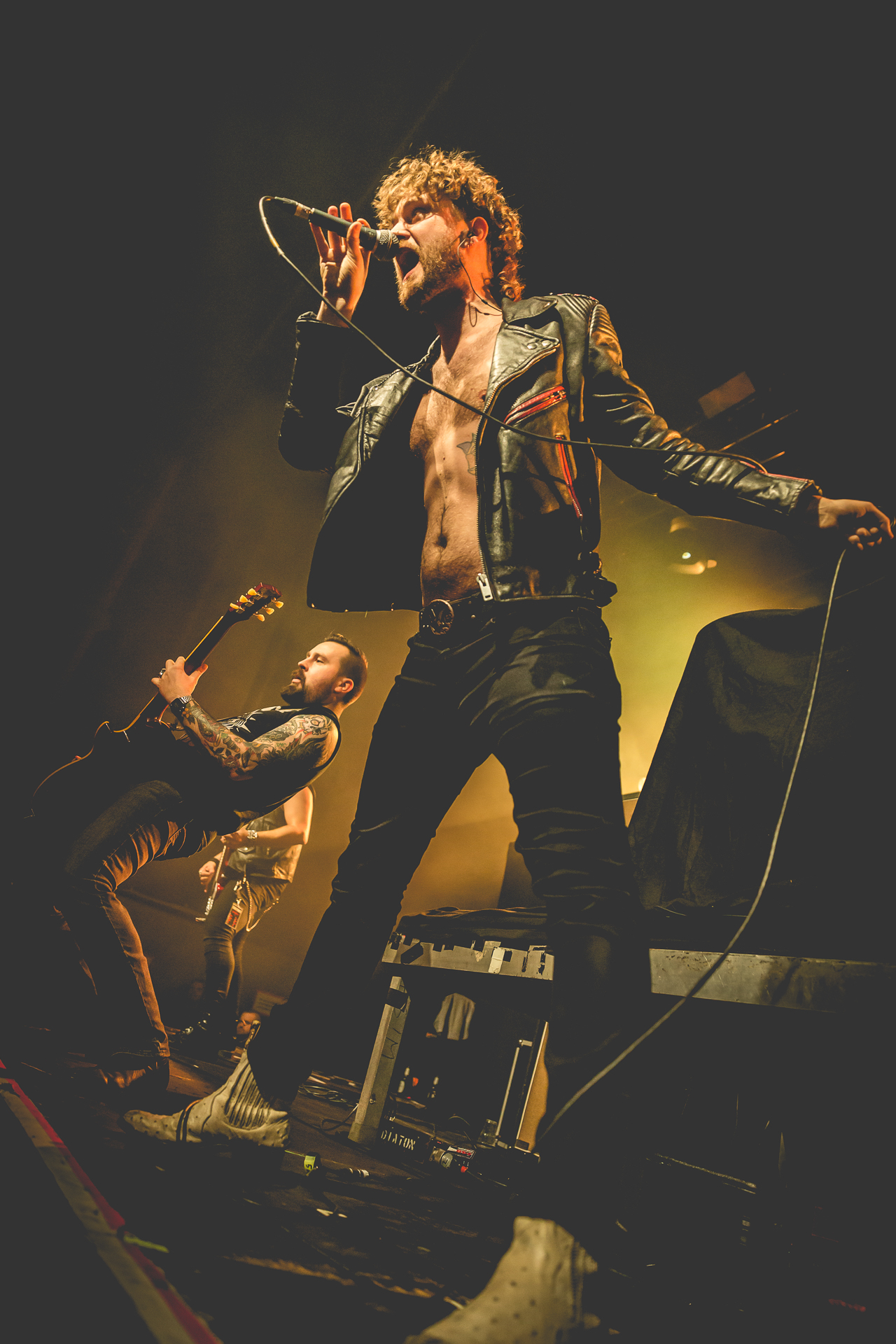

=== Foundation ===
The bandmembers Nik Bird (vocals, bass), Nik Beer (electric guitar) and Paris Jay (drums) have known each other since they were in kindergarten and grew up in the direct neighborhood in Wahlwies next to the Lake Constance. They have been performing and writing songs together since they were teenagers. At the end of 2014 they moved together to the Ruhr area to start Formosa as a power trio in 2015.

=== Tight & Sexy and Sorry for being sexy (2015–2018) ===
In 2015, the band members began working on their debut album and released Tight & Sexy on May 13, 2016 via the label Sweepland Records. This was followed by a Germany-wide album tour and numerous additional concerts in well-known club venues across the country.

As early as summer 2017, Formosa began recording their second studio album Sorry for Being Sexy. They performed as a support act for Battle Beast and Ignite and embarked on their first international tour through the Balkan states in the autumn. On March 2, 2018, the album Sorry for Being Sexy was released via Sweepland Records. The album reached number 9 in the official German Metal Rock Charts. Formosa played over 140 concerts across Europe between 2017 and 2018 and shared the stage with bands such as Thundermother, The New Roses, and Bonfire.

On January 6, 2017, singer Nik Bird dislocated his arm during a fall on stage. He nevertheless finished the concert and then entered the waiting ambulance. Andy Brings, who was present at the concert, commented on the accident and Nik Bird’s fearless continuation of the show as “a defining moment of rock ’n’ roll.”

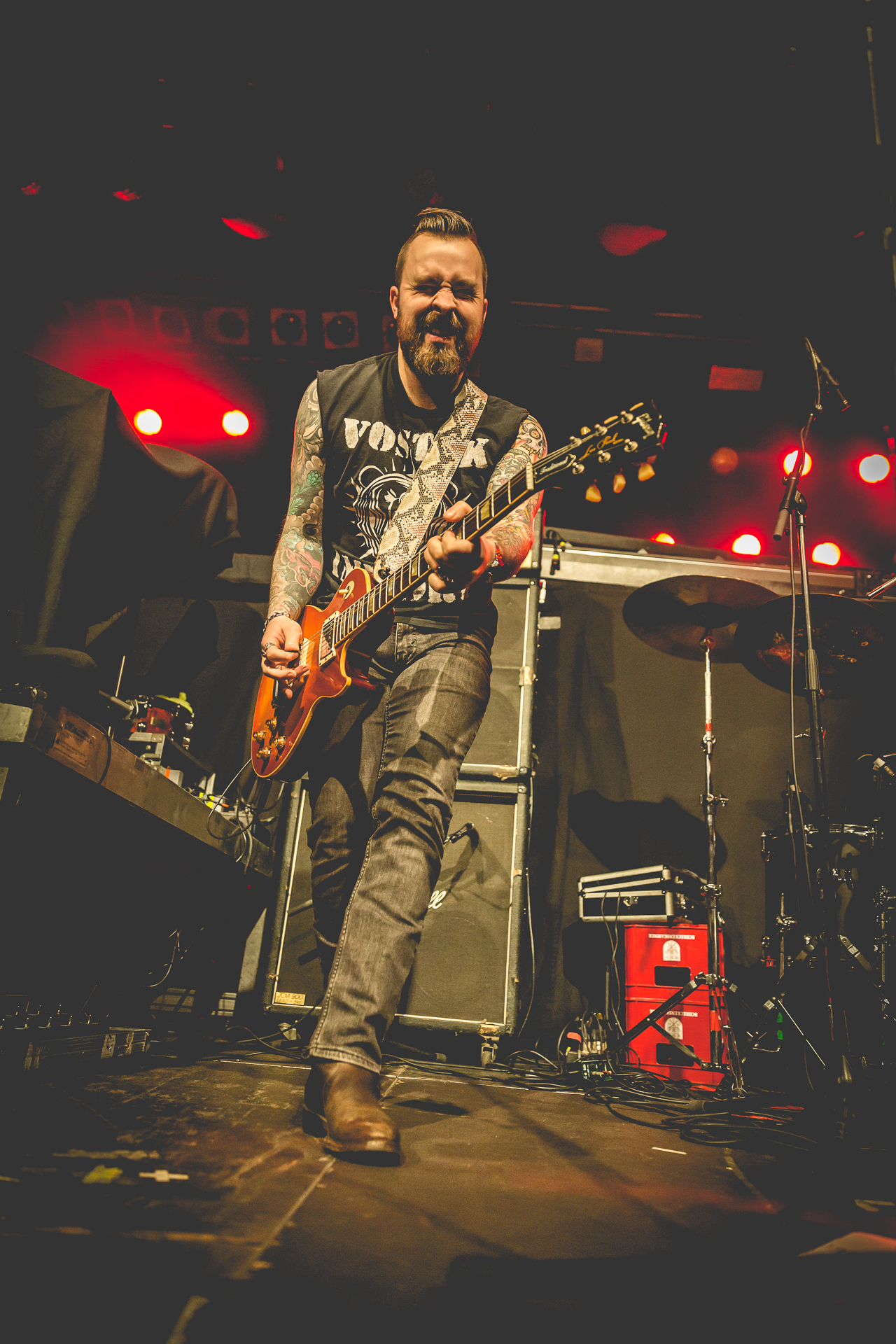

On 6 January 2017, singer Nik Bird dislocated his arm in a stage accident. He nevertheless played the concert to the end and then got into the already waiting ambulance. Andy Brings, who was present at the concert, commented on the accident and Nik Bird's fearless continuation of playing as "a great hour for rock 'n' roll".

=== Danger Zone and Bones EP (2019–2022) ===
In early 2019, Formosa recorded their third album Danger Zone in Antwerp. As producers, the band hired Martin Furia (eg. Destruction and Nervosa). After the recording sessions Formosa went on a support tour with Nazareth.

Formosa parted ways with their music label Sweepland Records and signed a label deal with Metalville. On 13 March 2020, Formosa released their third album Danger Zone – simultaneously, however, on the same day, the ongoing tour with Audrey Horne was canceled due to the COVID-19 pandemic.

In 2022, Formosa released several singles, which together appeared on the Bones EP. On the song Her Mama, guitarist Ande Braun from Kissin' Dynamite plays the guitar solo and can also be seen in the accompanying video. The acoustic version of the song Dynamite features a hammered dulcimer played by drummer Paris Jay.

=== Bittersweet and PYRITE (2023–2026) ===
At the beginning of 2023, the band announced their new studio album Bittersweet for release on April 21, 2023. In March, Formosa went on a European tour with Kissin’ Dynamite and Dynazty. During the tour, the band released the first two singles, Living on a Blade and Horns Up. After the band and the label Metalville parted ways in February, Formosa self-released the album in April under their own label Metalmosa and subsequently played a successful headlining tour, including several sold-out shows.

On January 31, 2025, Formosa released their fifth studio album Pyrite and played release shows in Düsseldorf and Paris. In April and May, they supported Massive Wagons on tour. In Summer the band played support for Takida on various open air shows. Following this, Formosa did a European tour with H.E.A.T for October 2025.

== Musical style and influence ==
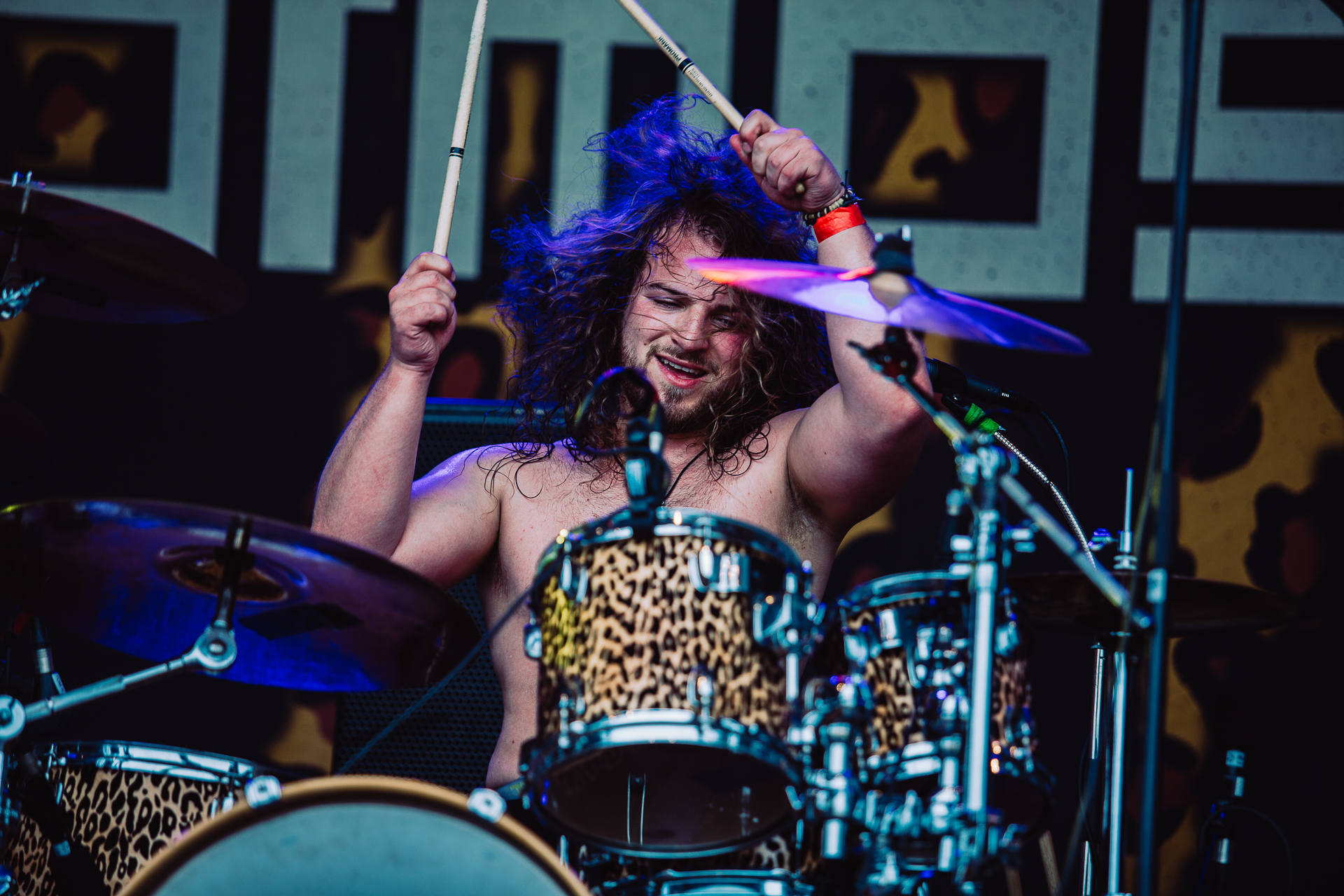
Drummer Paris Jay headbanging

Formosa are playing riff based melodic hard rock.

In addition to classic hard rock, Formosa's music also contains influences from heavy metal and southern rock. Notable band influences include Kiss, Judas Priest and AC/DC. Sometimes Formosa are compared with Whitesnake.

The band's lyrics are in English and are often characterized by striking phrases in the chorus. Examples here are songs like Fuck up your Liver and Sold my Soul. Often, the voice of Nik Bird is compared to the voice of the young Geddy Lee (Rush) or Vince Neil (Mötley Crüe).

The influences from southern rock, especially Lynyrd Skynyrd and ZZ Top are evident in the solo of Leader of the Pack and with Manic Lover Formosa have a power ballad in their repertoire.

Typical movements are the "Judas Priest moves" of Nik Bird and Nik Beer and the intense headbanging of drummer Paris Jay.

== Formosa Bierfest ==
=== Concept and History ===
Formosa host their own annual festival in the Ruhr area called the “Formosa Bierfest.” A unique feature of the festival is that the band’s guitarist, Nik Beer, personally creates and brews the beer for it each year. Nik Beer is a trained master brewer. In 2022, the beer festival was held in Essen for the first time. Due to growing demand, the festival had to be moved to a larger venue and was relocated to Oberhausen in 2023. In 2024, the festival returned to Essen, this time to an even larger venue.

=== Line-Up and Visitors ===
Formosa Bierfest'25 (Zeche Carl, Essen, Visitors: 600, sold out): Formosa, Hammer King, Snakebite, Ablaze, Crossplane

Formosa Bierfest'24 (Zeche Carl, Essen, Visitors: 600, sold out): Motorjesus, Formosa, Spiders, Vulvarine und Sweet Electric

Formosa Bierfest'23 (Druckluft, Oberhausen, Visitors: 300): Formosa, Hardbone, Harsh und Violet

Formosa Bierfest'22 (Café Nova, Essen, Visitors: 200, sold out): Splinter, Formosa, Fighter V und the Pighounds

== Discography ==
=== Albums ===
- 2016: Tight & Sexy (Sweepland Records)
- 2018: Sorry for Being Sexy (Sweepland Records)
- 2020: Danger Zone (Metalville)
- 2023: Bittersweet (Metalmosa Records)
- 2025: PYRITE (Metalmosa Records)
