= Dol Guldur (album) =

Studio album by Summoning
- Released: January 1997
- Recorded: October 1996 at Hörnix Studio
- Genre: Atmospheric black metal
- Length: 68:50
- Label: Napalm

Summoning chronology
Minas Morgul (1995)	Dol Guldur (1997)	Nightshade Forests (1997)

Professional ratings
Review scores
Source	Rating
Chronicles of Chaos	10/10

Dol Guldur is the third studio album by the Austrian black metal band Summoning. It was released in 1997, through Napalm Records.

== Background ==
All lyrics are written by P. K. of the black metal band Abigor apart from those by J. R. R. Tolkien, who is even credited in the album booklet.

The final track, "Over Old Hills", is based on the song "Trapped and Scared" from Protector's solo project, Ice Ages' debut album "Strike the Ground".

The album's cover was adapted from 'Middle Earth', a painting by Roger Garland, and from a picture of the Ottenstein reservoir in the Austrian Waldviertel, showing the ruins of Lichtenfels Castle.

== Track listing ==
No.	Title	Length
1.	"Angbands Schmieden" ("Forges of Angband")	3:30
2.	"Nightshade Forests"	10:49
3.	"Elfstone"	10:51
4.	"Khazad Dûm"	10:58
5.	"Kôr"	11:00
6.	"Wyrmvater Glaurung"	3:05
7.	"Unto a Long Glory..."	9:37
8.	"Over Old Hills"	8:58
Total length:		68:50

== Credits ==
- Protector – vocals, guitar, keyboards
- Silenius – vocals, keyboards
- P. K. – lyrics
