= CVLT =

CVLT or Cvlt may refer to:

- California Verbal Learning Test, a neuropsychological test in North America
- CVLT (organization), defunct online child exploitation organization
- CVLT Nation, an international online magazine
- Cvlt Ov The Svn, Finnish metal band
