= Ice Ages (band) =

Ice Ages is an Austrian dark electro/industrial darkwave band signed to Napalm Records. The band is a one-man band consisting of Richard Lederer from Summoning and Die Verbannten Kinder Evas.

== Biography ==
Richard Lederer began Ice Ages in 1997 with his debut album Strike the Ground. Since the release of Ice Ages' first album, there were significant delays before the three follow-up albums were released. After a three-year delay, The Killing Emptiness was released through Napalm Records in 2000 and, after eight more years, Buried Silence was released in 2008. In 2019, Nullify was released.

== Line-up ==
- Richard Lederer - all instruments

== Discography ==
=== Studio albums ===
- Strike the Ground (1997)
- This Killing Emptiness (2000)
- Buried Silence (2008)
- Nullify (2019)
- Vibe of Scorn (2021)
- Coma (2023)
- Parasiting Dreams (2024)
