= Let Mortal Heroes Sing Your Fame =

Studio album by Summoning
- Released: October 31, 2001
- Genre: Atmospheric black metal
- Length: 56:23
- Label: Napalm

Summoning chronology
Stronghold (1999)	Let Mortal Heroes Sing Your Fame (2001)	Oath Bound (2006)

Professional ratings
Review scores
Source	Rating
Chronicles of Chaos	8.5/10

Let Mortal Heroes Sing Your Fame is the fifth studio album by the Austrian black metal band Summoning. It was released on 31 October 2001, through Napalm Records. It is the first of their releases to feature clean male vocals, on the chorus of "Farewell". It is also their first album to make extensive use of audio samples (taken from radio productions of The Lord of the Rings), giving the album a slight dramaturgic bent. The cover art is based on Mark Harrison's painting, Draco Niger Grandis (1999), surrounded by a frame coming from Akseli Gallen-Kallela's The Aino Myth (1891).

== Track listing ==
No.	Title	Length
1.	"A New Power Is Rising"	4:08
2.	"South Away"	6:04
3.	"In Hollow Halls Beneath the Fells"	8:56
4.	"Our Foes Shall Fall"	7:01
5.	"The Mountain King's Return"	8:53
6.	"Runes of Power"	5:51
7.	"Ashen Cold"	6:16
8.	"Farewell"	9:19
Total length:		56:23

== Credits ==
- Protector – guitar, keyboards, drum programming, vocals on "In Hollow Halls Beneath the Fells", "Our Foes Shall Fall", "Runes of Power", "Ashen Cold"
- Silenius – keyboards, vocals on tracks "South Away", "The Mountain King's Return", "Farewell"
