= Minas Morgul (album) =

Studio album by Summoning
- Released: October 16, 1995
- Studio: Tonstudio Hornix
- Genre: Atmospheric black metal
- Length: 67:52
- Label: Napalm
- Producer: Summoning, Georg Hrauda

Summoning chronology
Lugburz (1995)	Minas Morgul (1995)	Dol Guldur (1996)

Minas Morgul is the second full-length album by the Austrian black metal band Summoning. The band and many of their fans consider this album to be their debut album as it developed the "Summoning sound" and brought the band to a larger audience due to its lyrics involving J. R. R. Tolkien's themes.

== Reception ==
Professional ratings
Review scores
Source	Rating
Metal1Info	3/5 stars
Medienkonverter	5/5 stars
Sputnik Music	4.5/5 stars
Metal Storm	10/10 stars
Blood Chamber	7.5/10 stars

The album received dominantly positive reviews. It was criticized for the vocals and Kraftwerk-esque drum sound, but was praised for its context referencing Tolkien. Sputnik describes the band's sound as bombastic and unique because the synths provide medieval sounds, giving it an amazing result when fused with guitars. Metal Storm considers the album as one of the most appreciated black metal releases.

== Track listing ==
No.	Title	Length
1.	"Soul Wandering" (Instrumental)	2:33
2.	"Lugburz"	7:14
3.	"The Passing of the Grey Company"	9:16
4.	"Morthond"	6:44
5.	"Marching Homewards"	8:11
6.	"Orthanc" (Instrumental)	1:40
7.	"Ungolianth"	6:36
8.	"Dagor Bragollach"	5:06
9.	"Through the Forest of Dol Guldur"	4:46
10.	"The Legend of the Master-Ring"	5:28
11.	"Dor Daedeloth"	10:16
Total length:		67:52

== Credits ==
- Protector – vocals, guitar, keyboards
- Silenius – bass, keyboards, vocals

== Illustration ==
The front illustration of the album comes from Mark Harrison's painting, The Call of the Sword, originally done in 1988 to illustrate the Roger Taylor's novel of the same name.

== See also ==
- Minas Morgul (Middle-earth)
