= Channeling the Quintessence of Satan =

Studio album by Abigor
- Released: 31 December 1999
- Recorded: Winter 1999
- Studio: Georg Hrauda's Hoernix Studio, Ziersdorf, Austria
- Genre: Black metal, avant-garde metal
- Length: 41:20
- Label: Napalm
- Producer: Abigor

Abigor chronology
Supreme Immortal Art (1998)	Channeling the Quintessence of Satan (1999)	Satanized (A Journey Through Cosmic Infinity) (2001)

Professional ratings
Review scores
Source	Rating
Collector's Guide to Heavy Metal	5/10
Rock Hard	7.5/10

Channeling the Quintessence of Satan is the fifth studio album release by Austrian black metal band Abigor. It was released in 1999.

== Track listing ==
1. "Dawn of Human Dust" – 5:49
2. "Pandemonic Revelation" – 4:56
3. "Equilibrium Pass By" – 6:18
4. "Wildfire and Desire" – 4:12
5. "Utopia Consumed" – 4:36
6. "Demon's Vortex" – 6:04
7. "Towards Beyond" 5:05
8. "Pandora's Miasmic Breath" – 4:20

== Credits ==
- Thurisaz – vocals, bass
- Peter Kubik – guitar
- Thomas Tannenberger – drums, guitar
