= WeltenBrand =

Music band from Liechtenstein

- Origin: Vaduz, Liechtenstein
- Genres: Darkwave; Neoclassical
- Years active: 1995–present
- Labels: M.O.S Records Ltd. Napalm Records
- Members: Dina Falk (vocals); Manja Wagner (vocals); Oliver Falk (keyboards); Daniela Nipp (violin); Christian Sele (bass); Patrick Margadant (drums)
- Past members: Mario Jahnke; Ritchie Wenaweser; Simone Villamar; Stefan Villamar; Adrian Büchel; Corinna Beck; Daniel Hähne; Rino Vetsch
- Website: weltenbrand.li

Weltenbrand is a darkwave band from Liechtenstein formed in 1995 by Oliver Falk. Ritchie Wenaweser and Simone Steiner joined for vocals. In the same year, the band secured a record deal with Witchhunt Records and subsequently released their first album, Das Rabenland. a romantically inclined darkwave album that immediately found acceptance within the genre.

A year later, WeltenBrand signed to Falks' own M.O.S. Records Ltd. to record their second album, Das Nachtvolk, released in 1997. This featured the violinist Daniela Nipp for the first time and remained true to the band's sound, while improving upon both the musical and vocal arrangements. Additionally, Richard Lederer of Summoning done guest vocals for this album.

The band's third album, Der Untergang Von Trisona, was released in 1999 and received praise from the media for its bombastic appeal and relentless energy apparent on each track. Its neodark classic style, boasting of medieval influences, also caught the attention of Liv Kristine (Leaves Eyes, ex Theatre of Tragedy) and Alexander Krull (Atrocity), whose enthusiasm can be heard on the album, as both of them contributed vocally to this work.

WeltenBrand released In Gottes Oder Des Teufels Namen in 2002. The album concentrated on clear vocal arrangements and straightforward compositions without losing the band's uniqueness. While each WeltenBrand album presents a different perspective of their sound, they do share a common thread. The lyrics always stem from Liechtensteins myths and legends as told by Dr. Otto Seger.

Following the disbandment of M.O.S. Records Ltd., WeltenBrand signed to Napalm Records in fall 2002 and began working on their fifth album, The End of the Wizard, released in February 2006. The album received an eight out of ten rating from Chronicles of Chaos. The tracks on this work continued to draw upon the magical uniqueness of songwriter Oliver Falks' compositions, while becoming more appealing to the masses. The End Of The Wizard promises to deliver an enchanting journey into the mythical world of Liechtenstein's myriad legends and sagas.

In spring 2005 two new members joined the band, Adrian Büchel (drums) and Christian Sele (bass guitar). At the end of 2005, Steiner left the band and was replaced by the female vocalist Dina Falk (former of Zambelli). Weltenbrand's fifth album The End of the Wizard, was released in August 2006.

In July 2007, male vocalist Wenaweser was replaced by the female vocalist Manja Wagner (former of Gückel). Currently, the band is working on a sixth album.

== Discography ==
- 1995 Das Rabenland (Witchhunt Records)
- 1997 Das Nachtvolk (M.O.S. Records)
- 1999 Der Untergang Von Trisona (M.O.S. Records)
- 2001 In Gottes Oder Des Teufels Namen (M.O.S. Records)
- 2006 The End Of the Wizard (Napalm Records)
