= Nightshade Forests =

EP by Summoning
- Released: June 3, 1997
- Studio: Switzerland
- Genre: Atmospheric black metal
- Length: 33:44
- Label: Napalm
- Producer: Summoning

Summoning chronology
Dol Guldur (1997)	Nightshade Forests (1997)	Stronghold (1999)

Professional ratings
Review scores
Source	Rating
Chronicles of Chaos	8.5/10

Nightshade Forests is the first EP by the Austrian black metal band Summoning. It consists of three songs left over from the writing sessions for their 1996 album Dol Guldur, as well as the newly written song "Habbanan Beneath the Stars". It was released on 3 June 1997, through Napalm Records.

== Track listing ==
No.	Title	Length
1.	"Mirkwood"	9:45
2.	"Kortirion Among the Trees"	8:51
3.	"Flesh and Blood"	7:55
4.	"Habbanan Beneath the Stars"	7:13
Total length:		33:44

== Credits ==
- Protector – vocals, guitars, keyboards
- Silenius – vocals, keyboards
