= Stronghold (Summoning album) =

Studio album by Summoning
- Released: May 11, 1999
- Genre: Atmospheric black metal
- Length: 64:21
- Label: Napalm
- Producer: Summoning

Summoning chronology
Nightshade Forests (1997)	Stronghold (1999)	Let Mortal Heroes Sing Your Fame (2001)

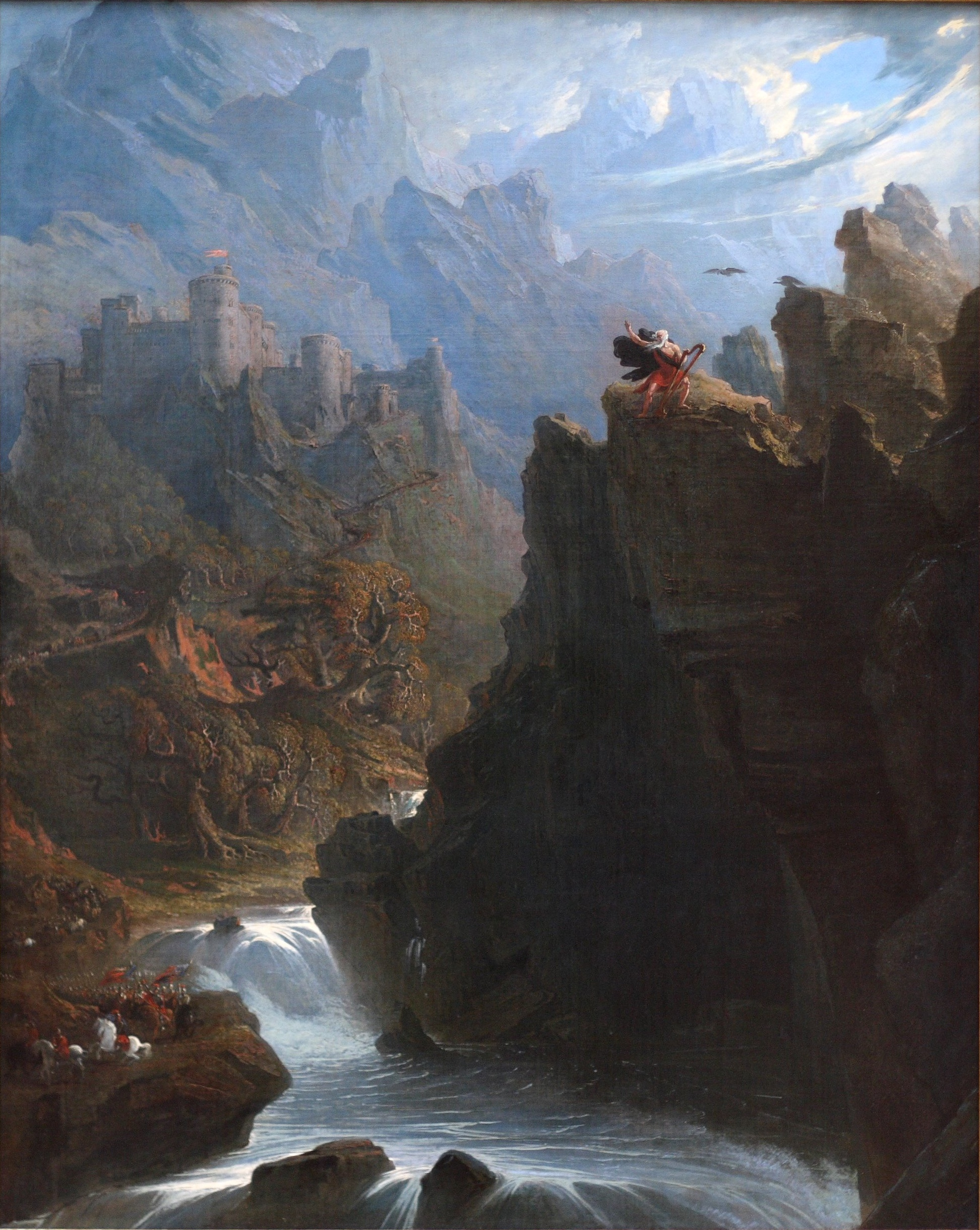
The Bard by John Martin, source of the album artwork.

Stronghold is the fourth full-length album by the Austrian black metal band Summoning. This album marked a change in the sound of Summoning as it was much more "guitar orientated with more compact keyboard-melodies". "Where Hope and Daylight Die" features Tania Borsky, Protector's ex-girlfriend and a former member of Die Verbannten Kinder Evas, on lead vocals. The album's cover was adapted from 'The Bard', an 1817 painting by John Martin.

This album is the first by Summoning to feature audio-clips; the clips used on this album were from the movies Braveheart and Legend.

== Track listing ==
No.	Title	Length
1.	"Rhûn"	3:25
2.	"Long Lost to Where No Pathway Goes"	7:23
3.	"The Glory Disappears"	7:49
4.	"Like Some Snow-White Marble Eyes"	7:19
5.	"Where Hope and Daylight Die"	6:28
6.	"The Rotting Horse on the Deadly Ground"	8:25
7.	"The Shadow Lies Frozen on the Hills"	7:01
8.	"The Loud Music of the Sky"	6:47
9.	"A Distant Flame Before the Sun"	9:43
Total length:		64:21

== Credits ==
- Protector - vocals, guitars, keyboards
- Silenius - vocals, keyboards
- Tania Borsky - vocals on 'Where Hope and Daylight Die'
