= Michael Gregor (musician) =

Austrian musician

- Also known as: Silenius
- Origin: Austria
- Genres: Dark ambient, black metal, darkwave, electronic music, industrial metal, martial industrial, dungeon synth
- Occupations: Musician, composer
- Instruments: Vocals, keyboard, bass, programming
- Years active: 1991–present
- Label: Napalm Records
- Member of: Amestigon; Summoning; Kreuzweg Ost; Abigor
- Formerly of: Die Verbannten Kinder Evas; Pazuzu

Michael Gregor (also known as Silenius) is an Austrian musician who is currently in the bands Amestigon (since 1998) as vocalist, Kreuzweg Ost as programmer, and Summoning as vocalist, keyboardist, and bassist; the two latter bands are bands that he is a founding member of. He supplied vocals for Abigor from 1994 to 1999, rejoined as a session musician in 2014 and became a full member again in 2020. Silenius was vocalist and keyboardist for Pazuzu and played on the band's split album and debut album. Along with fellow Summoning bandmate Richard Lederer, Silenius also used to be a member of Die Verbannten Kinder Evas, serving as a vocalist and a keyboardist. Silenius has recorded music for a project called "Mirkwood", of which no material has yet been released.

== Personal life ==
Considering the fantasy-related lyrical content of Summoning, Michael Gregor has explained that he has been interested in the works of J. R. R. Tolkien since age 16 or 17, but was interested in fantasy literature since his childhood.

== Discography ==
=== With Abigor ===
- In Hate & Sin (demo, 1994)
- Verwüstung – Invoke The Dark Age (full-length, 1994)
- Orkblut – the Retaliation (EP, 1995)
- Nachthymnen (From the Twilight Kingdom) (full-length, 1995)
- Opus IV (full-length, 1996)
- Apokalypse (EP, 1997)
- Supreme Immortal Art (full-length, 1998)
- Leymotif Luzifer (full-length, 2014)
- Höllenzwang (Chronicles of Perdition) (full-length, 2018)
- Black Icarus / Metamorphosis (EP, 2018)
- Totschläger (A Saintslayer's Songbook) (full-length, 2020)
- Taphonomia Aeternitatis - Gesänge im Leichenlicht der Welt (full-length, 2023)

=== With Amestigon ===
- Remembering Ancient Origins (EP, 2000)
- Fatal Illumination / Nebelung, 1384 (split, 2002)
- Sun of All Suns (full-length, 2009)
- Thier (full-length, 2015)
- SamaelLilith: A Conjunction of the Fireborn (split, 2021)

=== With Kreuzweg Ost ===
- Iron Avantgarde (full-length, 2000)
- Edelrost (full-length, 2005)
- Gott Mit Uns (full-length, 2012)

=== With Pazuzu ===
- The Urilla Text (split, 1994)
- ...And All Was Silent (full-length, 1994)

=== With Summoning ===
- Upon the Viking Stallion (demo, 1993)
- The Urilla Text (split, 1994)
- Anno Mortiri Domini (demo, 1994)
- Promo Tape (demo, 1994)
- Lugburz (full-length, 1995)
- Minas Morgul (demo, 1995)
- Minas Morgul (full-length, 1995)
- Dol Guldur (full-length, 1996)
- Nightshade Forests (EP, 1997)
- Stronghold (full-length, 1999)
- Let Mortal Heroes Sing Your Fame (full-length, 2001)
- Lost Tales (EP, 2003)
- Oath Bound (full-length, 2006)
- Old Mornings Dawn (full-length, 2013)
- With Doom We Come (full-length, 2018)
