= Shylmagoghnar =

Metal band from the Netherlands

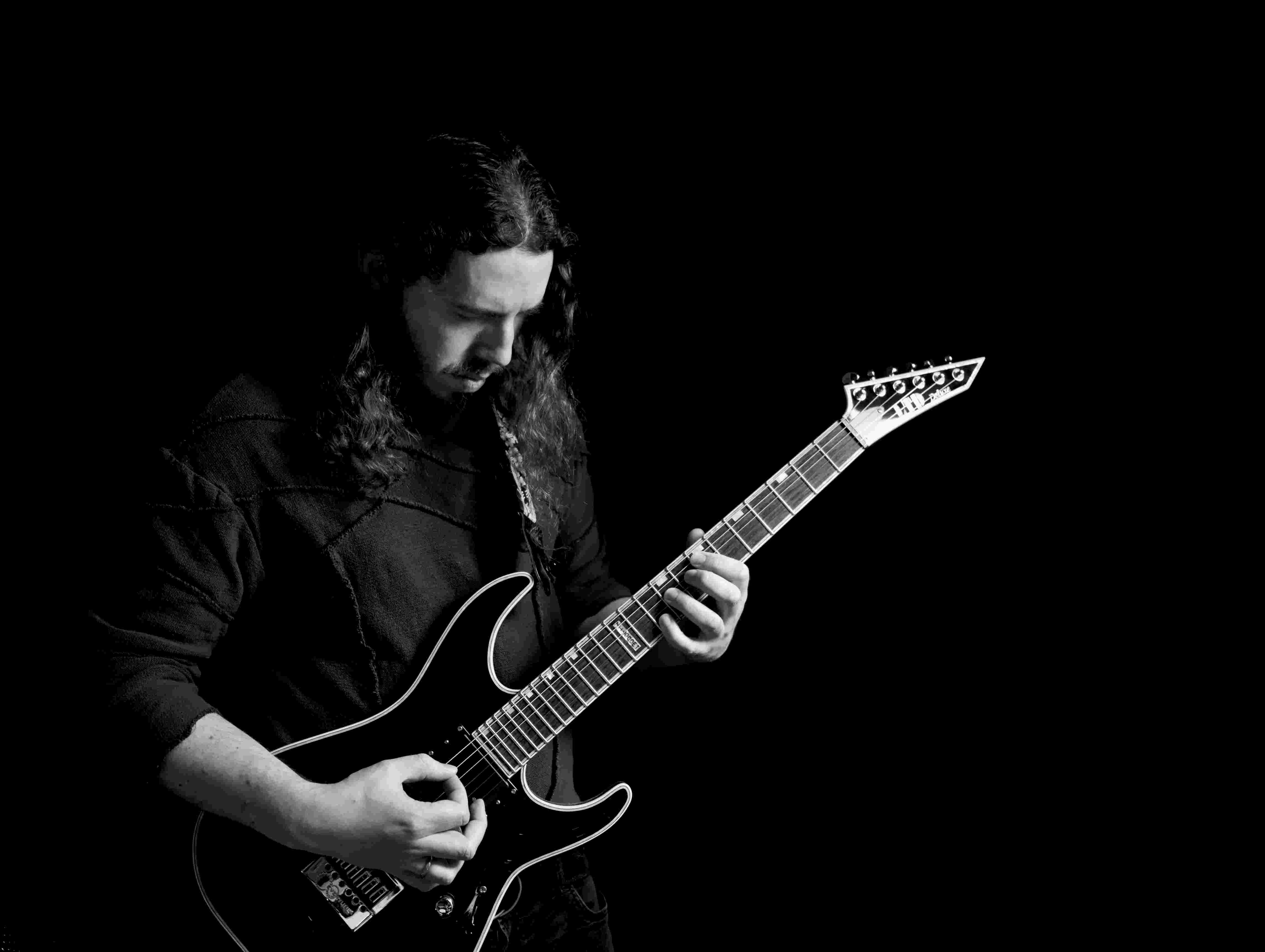
- Nimblkorg playing guitar 2023

Background information
- Origin: South Limburg, The Netherlands
- Genres: Melodic black metal; melodic death metal; progressive metal
- Years active: 2004–present
- Label: Napalm Records
- Members: Nimblkorg
- Past members: Skirge
- Website: shylmagoghnar.com

Shylmagoghnar (/ʃilməɡɒxnɑːr/) is a Dutch melodic black metal and death metal band from Zuid-Limburg.

The name is a collection of syllables, which founding members Nimblkorg and Skirge selected because they had personal resonance with them. They wanted to create a name which sounds otherworldly to match the music. The exact meaning of the name is kept a secret.

== History ==
The band was formed by Nimblkorg (born: Kevin Bertrand) and Skirge (born: Coen van der Weerden) in 2004, as a high school project between friends. Nimblkorg started out as a guitarist and Skirge as a lyricist/vocalist, but over time they both starting taking on multiple instruments and musical roles. Nimblkorg also felt drawn to the production side of music, which led to the band's body of work being fully home-produced.

After a decade of practice and rewriting their demos, they would create and self-release their debut Emergence in 2014. This album garnered attention from the label Napalm Records, with which they signed a worldwide contract in 2016. This was followed by the second album release, Transience in 2018, together with a vinyl re-release of the debut album Emergence.

After this release, Skirge would leave the band due to personal life issues and Nimblkorg continued as a solo artist. He produced the album Convergence, which was released through Napalm Records in 2023. The album received favorable reviews. Metal Hammer Germany reviewed in their December issue of 2023 that "Convergence is euphorically jubilant at first, lost in thought later, followed by it shimmering like a mathematical puzzle, only to get raunchy shortly after", ranking it within the issue's top 10.

The band has stated to not have any interest in live performance, nor see it as an end goal. According to Nimblkorg, this is because he does not enjoy being in public and instead sees music as an introspective journey. He prefers to experiment with finding ways to create music which connects to the listener on a personal level.

== Genre and influences ==
Early influences for the band were a mix between death and black metal musicians (for example Immortal, Dimmu Borgir, Summoning, Death, Morbid Angel, Satyricon.), but a part of the inspiration came from video game soundtracks (Commodore 64 soundtracks, Blood, The Settlers). There have also been influences by musicians outside of the metal genre, like Kate Bush, Jean-Michel Jarre, Basil Poledouris, Tom Waits, Edvard Grieg, Claude Debussy and Smetana

The band expresses that they do not intend to be part of any specific genre – instead using whichever style they feel fit the current song.

Nimblkorg also mentions that many musical ideas are inspired by melodies or lyrics heard in dreams or during episodes of mental illness. Nimblkorg has schizoaffective disorder.

== Members ==
=== Current members ===
Nimblkorg – Guitars, bass, drums, synthesizers, piano, flute, violin, vocals (2004–present), lead vocals (2018–present)

=== Past members ===
Skirge – Lead vocals, synthesizers on "The Sun No Longer" (2004–2018)

== Discography ==
- Emergence (2014)
- Transience (2018)
- Convergence (2023)
