= Hiraes =

German melodic death metal band

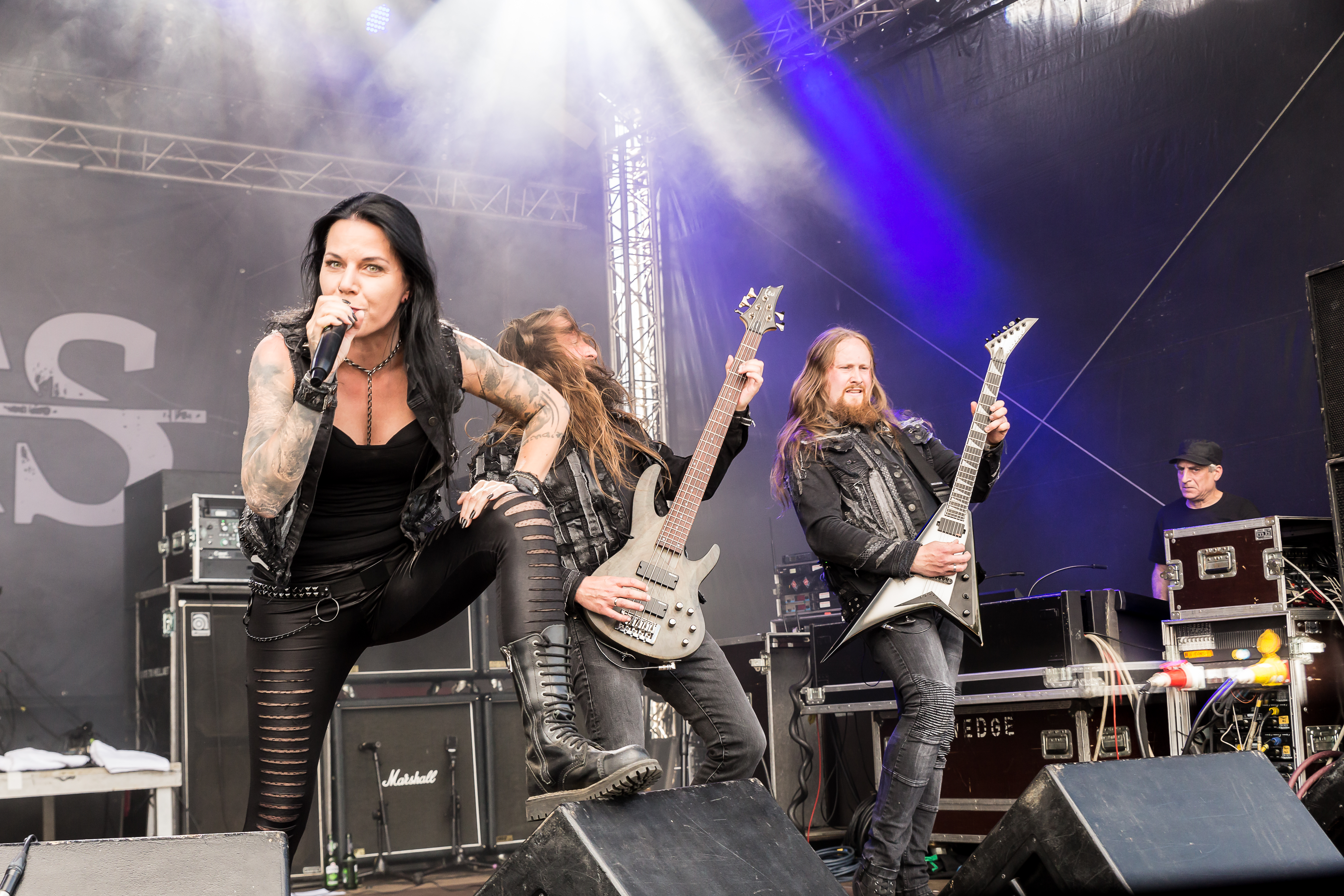
- Hiraes at Metal Frenzy Open Air 2022

Background information
- Origin: Osnabrück, Germany
- Genres: Melodic death metal
- Years active: 2020–present
- Label: Napalm Records
- Members: Britta Görtz; Lukas Kerk; Oliver Kirchner; Christian Wösten; Mathias Blässe

Hiraes is a German melodic death metal band from Osnabrück, which consists of former members of Dawn of Disease and Britta Görtz, the former singer of Critical Mess.

== History ==
In 2020, the former Dawn of Disease bandmates teamed up with singer Britta Görtz of Critical Mess under the name Hiraes. Dawn of Disease disbanded following the departure of singer Tomasz Wisniewski who began to fully focus on Nyktophobia in 2020. Up to this point the band had released five studio albums. Singer Britta Görtz also released a total of five studio albums with her former band Cripper and then two more studio albums with her successor band Critical Mess.

On 25 June 2021, Hiraes released their debut album Solitary on Napalm Records. In an interview with the music magazine Rock Hard, Görtz reports that all of the songs on the album were written when the band was still nameless but already complete. The band name comes from the Welsh word Hiraeth, which stands for nostalgia, melancholy and holding on to places of the past that never existed and the longing for them. "Our music reflects this very well", explains Görtz.

In an interview with the music magazine Metal Hammer, the band reports how much the pandemic has shaped their musical work. While the album Solitary deals thematically with the experiences of being alone during the pandemic, Dormant deals with the search for one's own path, for resilience and inner strength.

Hiraes' second album Dormant was released on 24 January 2024, again by Napalm Records and reached number 36 in the German album charts.

== Musical style ==
Musically, Hiraes is described as a mixture of Arch Enemy and The Halo Effect and compared to the genre greats Dark Tranquility, Insomnium, In Flames and Soilwork. The pounding rhythm in combination with the noble lead guitar harmonies is also said to be reminiscent of Amon Amarth.

The debut album Solitary is an anachronistic and at the same time modern melodic death metal album with a classic, Scandinavian influence. Hiraes rely on drama, melody and gripping guitars, the songs are mostly in the medium tempo range, and short brutal outbursts like the title song Solitary seem all the more intense.

The second album Dormant is described as brutal, but still very melody-driven. The focus is on multi-faceted guitar motifs and varied drumming, which are stylishly underpinned with harmoniously crafted electronic sounds. Singer Britta Görtz is credited with having the strongest performance of her career to date and can even impress with her atmospheric clear singing in the song Undercurrent.

== Band members ==
Hiraes, band members at Rockharz 2026

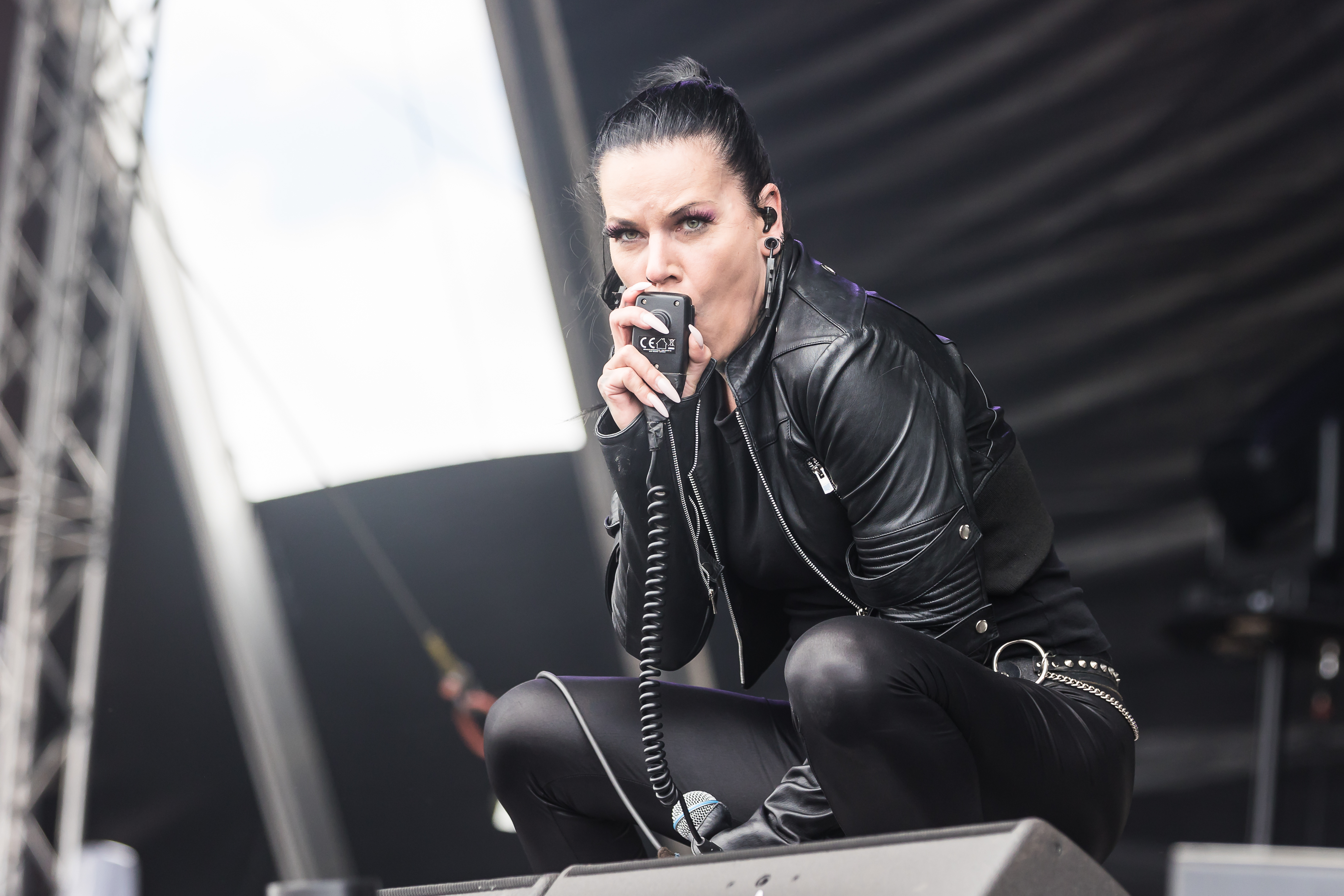
Britta Görtz, vocals

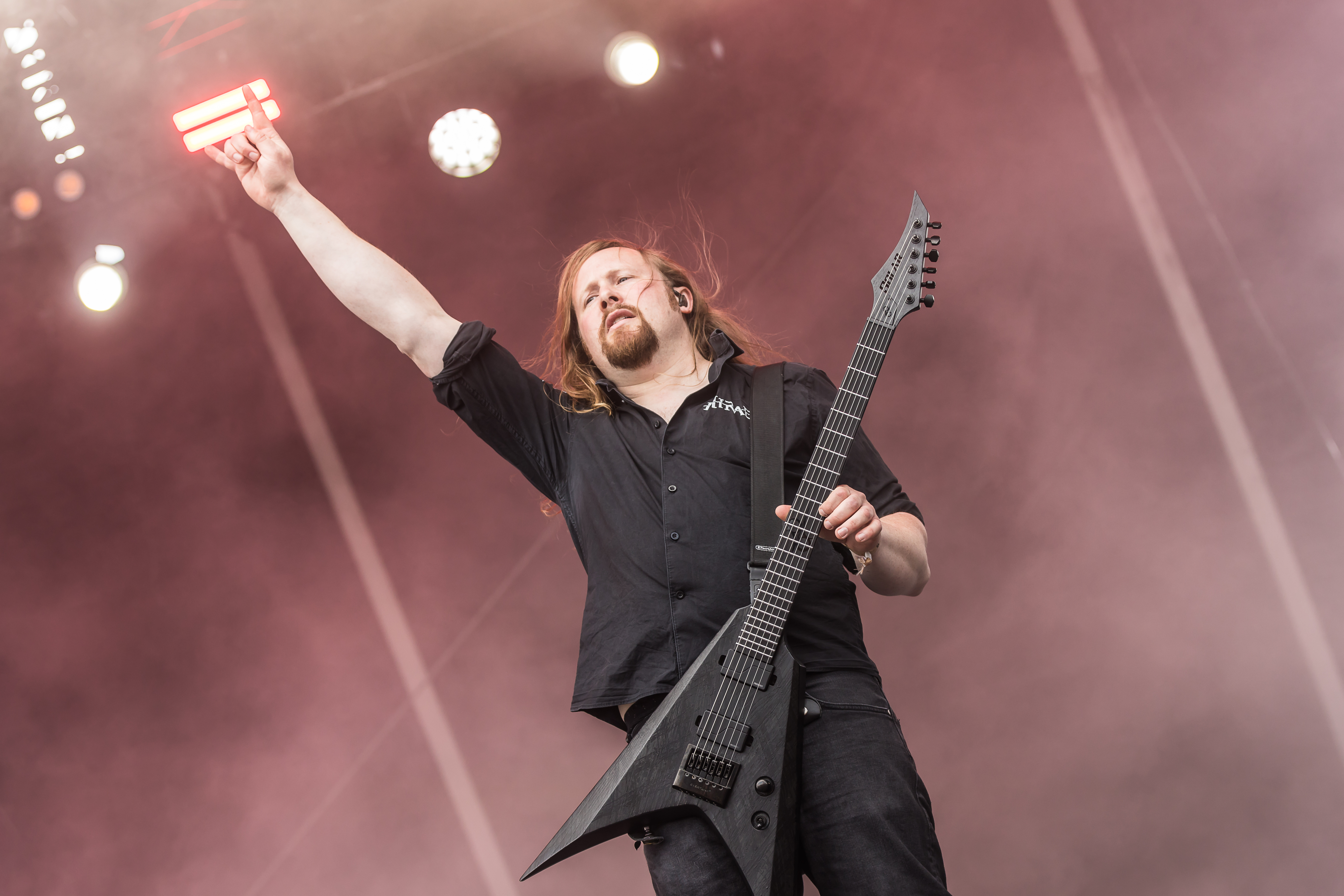
Lukas Kerk, guitars

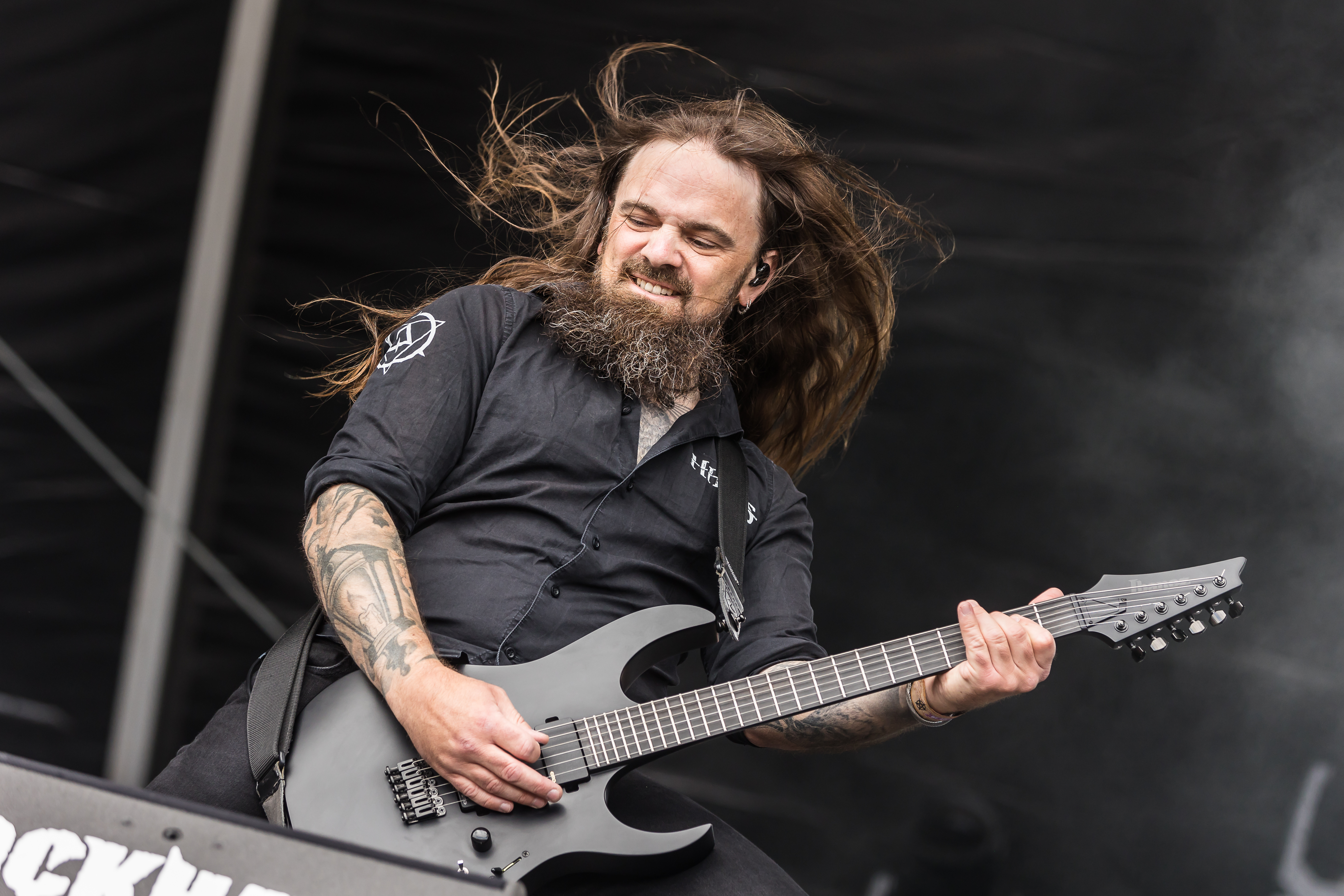
Oliver Kirchner, guitars

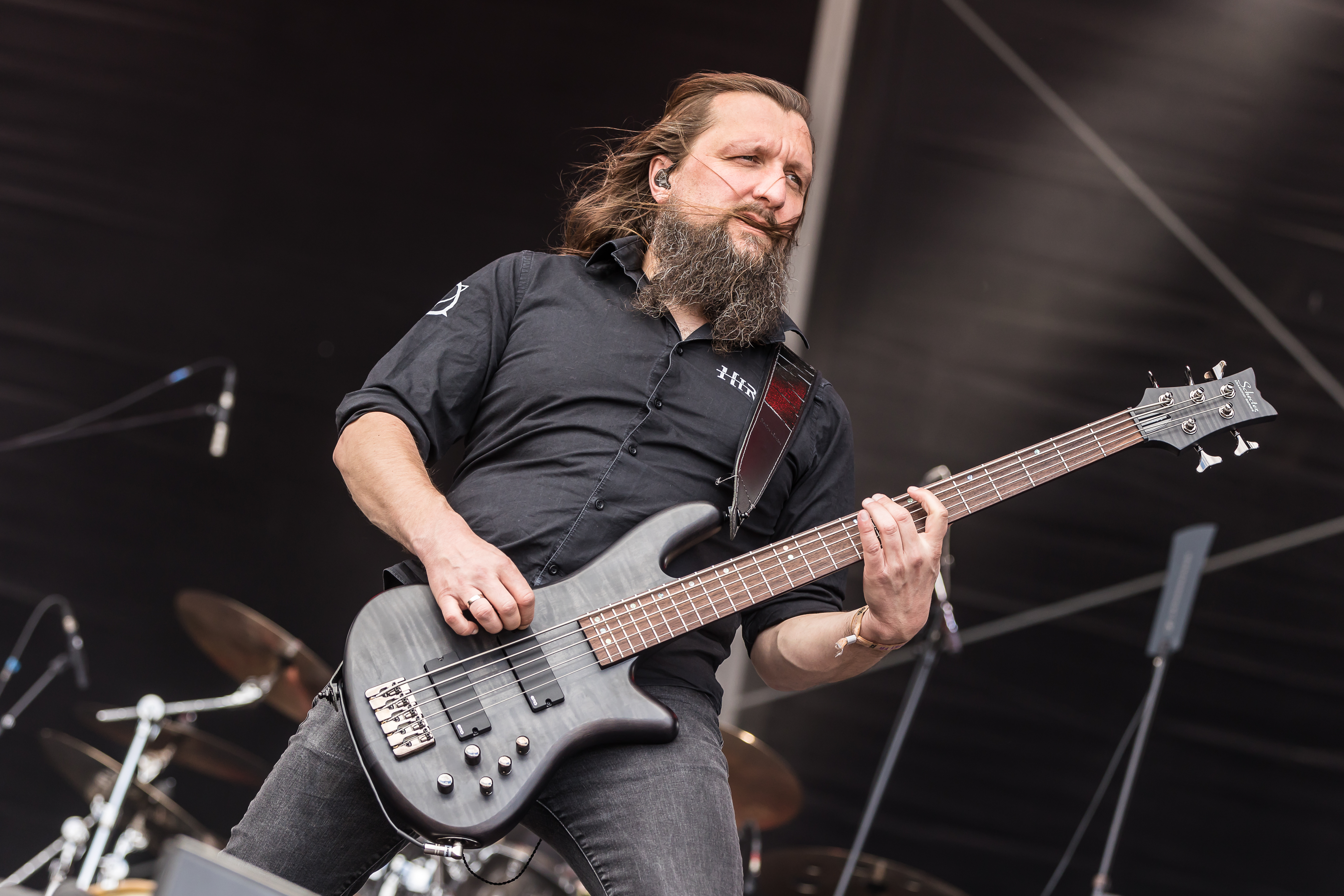
Christian Wösten, bass

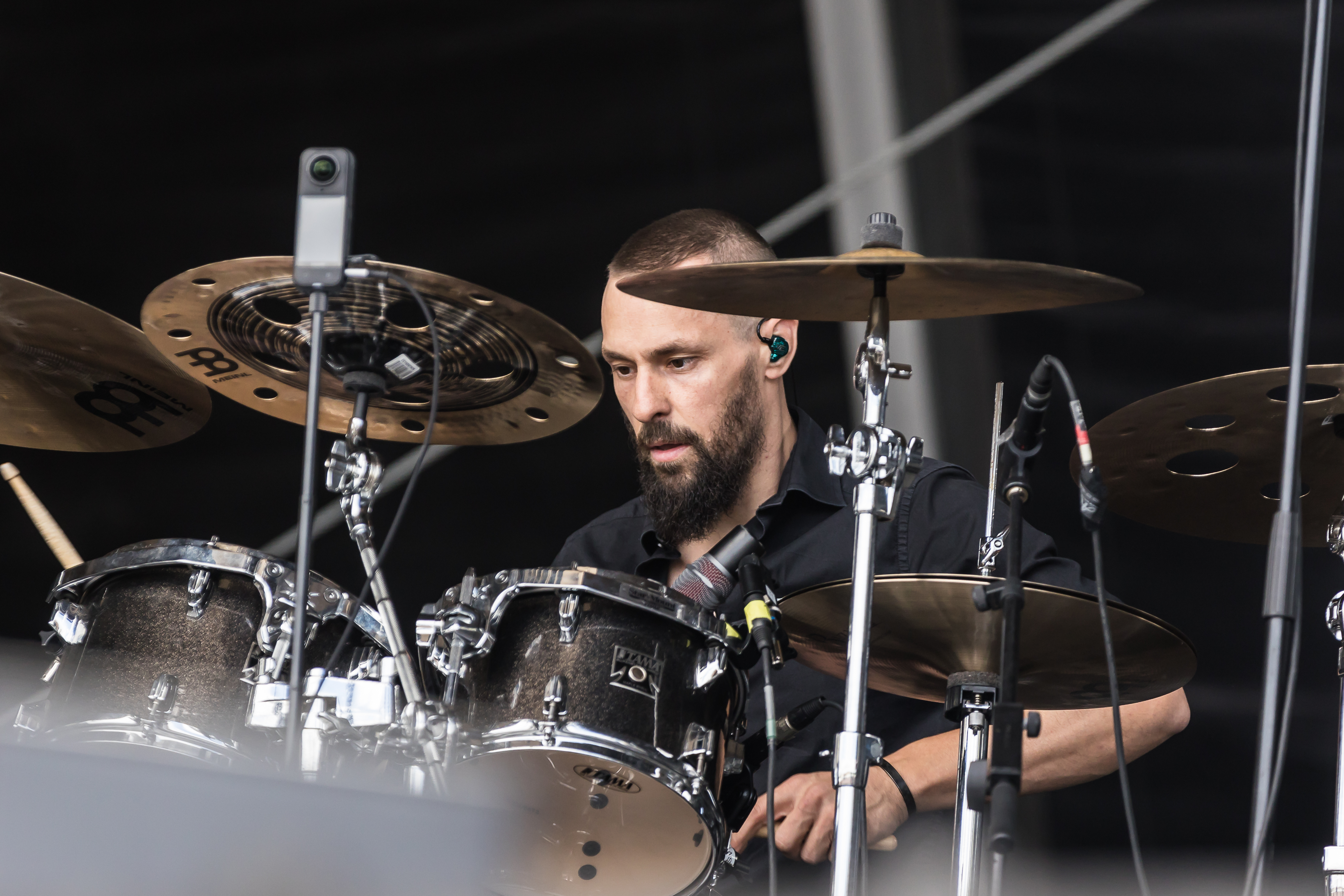
Mathias Blässe, drums

== Discography ==
=== Studio albums ===
List of studio albums, with selected details
Title	Album details	Peak chart positions
Title	Album details	GER
Solitary	Released: 7 July 2021; Label: Napalm Records; Formats: CD, digital download, streaming	—
Dormant	Released: 26 January 2024; Label: Napalm Records; Formats: CD, digital download, streaming	36
