= The Bulletmonks =

Bulletmonks
- Origin: Erlangen, Germany
- Genres: Alternative rock Hard rock Heavy metal
- Years active: 2008-present
- Labels: Napalm Records (AUT); Deaf Shepherd
- Members: Tilman Brunke (as Tyler Voxx); Daniel Brunke (as Dangerous Dan); Markus Schuster (as Shark Shooster); Bristle Brush Johnson; Chick Mendoza
- Past members: Tim Pintkiller; Spreace Jackson; M.Dogg; Boris Golembiewski
- Website: BulletMonks.com

The Bulletmonks are a hard rock band based in Nuremberg, Germany. Formed in 2008, the band is currently signed to Deaf Shepherd. The current lineup consists of brothers Tilman "Tyler Voxx" Brunke (vocals and guitar), 'Dangerous' Dan (lead guitar), Chick Mendoza (bass), Shark Shooster (lead guitar) and 'Bristle Brush Johnson' (drums).

The musical style of The Bulletmonks has been described as rock and metal mixed with blues. The press has referred to their music as "Mosh 'n' Roll" and they have been compared to Led Zeppelin, The Answer, Airbourne and AC/DC. Andy Powell from Wishbone Ash features as a guest guitarist in the song Under the Black Sun.

The band received encouraging reviews for their debut album Weapons of Mass Destruction which was released on March 30, 2009.

The Bulletmonks toured throughout 2010 and have supported bands like WASP, UFO, D-A-D and Volbeat and co-headlined Hamburgs Welt Astra Tag Festival in 2010 in front of an estimated crowd of 48,000. On January 20, 2012, they released their second studio album Royal Flush on the Titanic.

In winter 2012/2013 guitarist Shark Shooster joined the band, while Tyler Voxx decided to concentrate on singing. In summer 2013 the Bulletmonks recorded their 3rd album which was released in September 2014. In the middle of the recording, the band parted ways with their drummer M.Dogg, and replaced him by L.A. Music Academy Student Bristle Brush Johnson, who played with Shark Shooster in Nürnbergs Willie Tanner before they split. The band went on extensive touring with the new material in the second half of 2014.

Although the band never officially split, they haven't been active since their last tour in 2016. It was rumored that they are working on new material in 2020. They officially started working on material for their 4th album in December 2024, with a new album set for 2026, according to their socials.

== Discography ==
- Weapons of Mass Destruction (2009)
- Royal Flush on the Titanic (2012)
- No More Warnings (2014)
