= Angizia =

- Origin: Austria
- Genres: Avant-garde metal, Dark Cabaret, folk metal, black metal, gothic metal, symphonic metal, classical music
- Years active: 1994–present
- Labels: Napalm Records; Black Rose Productions
- Website: www.angizia.com

Angizia is an Austrian avant-garde gothic/folk metal band, formed in Austria in 1994 by Michael Haas (also known as Engelke).

== Discography ==
=== Studio albums ===
- Die Kemenaten scharlachroter Lichter (Napalm Records, 1997)
- Das Tagebuch der Hanna Anikin (Napalm Records, 1997)
- Das Schachbrett des Trommelbuben Zacharias (Black Rose Productions, 1998)
- 39 Jahre für den Leierkastenmann (Napalm Records, 2001)
- Ein Toter fährt gern Ringelspiel (2004)
- kokon. Ein schaurig-schönes Schachtelstück (2011)
- Des Winters finsterer Gesell (2013)

=== Split albums and collaborations ===
- Heidebilder (split with Amestigon) (1996)

=== Compilations ===
- With Us or Against Us - Volume 2 (contributed the track Der Kirschgarten oder Memoiren an die Stirn der Kindeszeit) (1997)
- Kenotaph (contributed the track Ithzak Kaufmann und das Bindfadencello) (2005)
