= Summoning (band) =

Austrian black metal band

- Origin: Vienna, Austria
- Genre: Atmospheric black metal
- Years active: 1993–present
- Label: Napalm
- Members: Protector; Silenius
- Past members: Trifixion; Pazuzu

Summoning is an Austrian atmospheric black metal band based in Vienna. Since their formation in 1993, they have released eight full-length albums and two EPs via Napalm Records. Their lyrics use J. R. R. Tolkien's Middle-earth writings and mythology. Since 1995, they have had a consistent lineup of Richard Lederer as "Protector" and Michael Gregor as "Silenius". The band is adamant about never performing live. They released their latest album, With Doom We Come, on 5 January 2018.

== History ==
=== Early years (1993–1995) ===
Silenius (Michael Gregor), Protector (Richard Lederer), and Trifixion (Alexander Trondl) formed Summoning in 1993. Before that, Protector drummed in thrash/death metal band Marlignom, and studied drums in music school for four years. At 16, Silenius was in doom metal band Shadow Vale, and studied piano for a few years in music school. He played in Cromm with Pazuzu (Ray Wells). Trifixion was a member of Pervertum.

Summoning recorded the demos Upon the Viking's Stallion and Anno Mortiri Domini), a split with Austrian band Pazuzu (The Urilia Text), and a five-track promo tape for Lugburz. Nearly all of demo songs were never released or were recomposed for future albums.

The demos sold well in Vienna record shop "Why not". Silenius founded Abigor with Thomas Tannenberger. Silenius sang on all Abigor releases (except demos) as a permanent member until 1999. Abigor recorded their first album for Napalm Records, which led to Napalm signing Summoning for their debut Lugburz album in 1995. At that time, the members of Summoning were Silenius (vocals, keyboards, bass), Protector (vocals, keyboards, guitar), and Trifixion (drums). Pazuzu did additional vocals and wrote some lyrics. Lugburz, Trifixion's last release with Summoning, was a traditional black metal album, unlike the band's subsequent releases.

=== Active years (1995–2003) ===
The band continued as a duo after Trifixion left. They released Minas Morgul in 1995, the band's first release with an atmospheric style that pushed guitars to the background and used synth almost as a lead on re-recorded early songs. Dol Guldur, released in 1997, continued this style, influenced by Protector's dark wave project Ice Ages. It credits J. R. R. Tolkien for the lyrics. Later in 1997, they released the Nightshade Forests EP. Following this, the band and related music projects ceased all work for nearly two years. In 1999, Summoning returned with Stronghold, which focused on guitar work to create melodic lines rather than keyboards and synthesizers like previous releases.

In 2001, they released follow-up album Let Mortal Heroes Sing Your Fame. This release combined Summoning's old and new styles, with polyphonic keyboard lines and rock-esque guitars that bore a similarity to Stronghold. The band used more spoken-word samples for dramatic flair. For the first time, the band included clear vocal choirs, on the song "Farewell". The lyrics were based on Tolkien's Middle-earth, especially The Hobbit, but for the first time they took inspiration from Michael Moorcock's fantasy writings. In 2003, they released the Lost Tales EP, which consisted of leftovers from the Dol Guldur sessions.

=== Oath Bound and inactivity (2006–2011) ===
2006 saw the release of Oath Bound, which consisted of entirely new material, largely based on The Silmarillion. The five year long break between the releases of Let Mortal Heroes Sing Your Fame and Oath Bound was due to struggles in the band members' personal lives, along with lack of ideas. Oath Bound featured a "relaxed arpeggio style" guitar sound, which gave a more epic feeling to the sound of the album. The band also had higher-quality equipment available to them for the recording of the album and were able to create greater choir vocals than they had done before. A 4-song mini CD was suggested for release in 2007 containing at least one song which did not make it onto Oath Bound due to size issues, however, this idea was abandoned and Protector instead began work on music for a full-length release while waiting for Silenius to finish recording the next Kreuzweg Ost album.

Following the release of Oath Bound, Summoning entered a period of inactivity. Silenius experienced a creative block and lacked inspiration for creating new music for Summoning. He also suffered a heart attack. In an interview for IsolationGrind, he is quoted saying: "a heart-infarct knocked me out for another half a year, but somehow all this brought me to a point where I got hungry again and since then I concentrated again on making riffs. Everything started in small steps. but after a while I knew in which direction the music was going and the more I knew this, the easier it was to compose and the result is what you hear now."

=== Old Mornings Dawn (2012–2017) ===
In February 2012, the band announced on their website that they were in the process of writing new songs, and hoped to have most of the songs complete by the end of the year. In December 2012 it was announced that all the guitars and Protector's vocal parts for the new album were complete and that the upcoming album would be entitled Old Mornings Dawn. The album was released in June 2013 via Napalm Records and lyrically focused mostly on nature themes, as well as J.R.R. Tolkien's Valinor.

In 2015 the band confirmed that they had already begun working on creating a new album, and were focused on rewriting some of the leftover material from Old Mornings Dawn.

On 15 December 2016, a compilation tribute album titled In Mordor Where The Shadows Are - Homage to Summoning was released by Wolfspell Records. The album features covers of 21 different Summoning songs by artists such as Caladan Brood and Emyn Muil.

=== With Doom We Come (2018) ===
On 12 August 2017, Summoning posted an update on their official Facebook page saying that, despite troubles, setbacks and disputes, the band's new album would be released in January 2018 by Napalm Records. The band posted a teaser of the new music, although they did not disclose the name of the forthcoming album.

On 1 October 2017, Summoning posted an update on their Facebook page announcing the title of the album as With Doom We Come. The album was subsequently released on 5 January 2018.

== Musical style and influences ==
The band's debut album Lugburz was a traditional black metal album, with a raw, lo-fi production style. On their following album Minas Morgul the band's sound changed significantly, and has been characterised as "a departure from straight black metal in favor of bold atmospheric experimentation which retains a definite blackened feel." The band's sound has remained relatively consistent since then. It was frequently described as "epic", "hypnotic", and "atmospheric", and makes extensive use of keyboards, choir vocals, clean singing, synthesized instruments, and programmed drums. Though the drums are programmed, they are played using a keyboard rather than with a drum machine. Their sound has been described as "a particularly widescreen version of progressive black metal, a style that more recently has been infused with an almost medieval strain of twiddly folk music of the lutes 'n' flutes variety." The band's music is deeply influenced by the literature of J. R. R. Tolkien, particularly The Lord of the Rings. Most of the band's lyrics are derived from Tolkien's own works. Silenius claimed to be influenced by dark wave and ritualistic music as well as fantasy literature.

The band stated that they consider themselves to be composers rather than musicians and do not practice together before recording. Guitarist Protector does not own a guitar and, until at least 2013, has used a different borrowed guitar for every recording since Dol Guldur.

== Discography ==
=== Studio albums ===
- Lugburz (1995)
- Minas Morgul (1995)
- Dol Guldur (1997)
- Stronghold (1999)
- Let Mortal Heroes Sing Your Fame (2001)
- Oath Bound (2006)
- Old Mornings Dawn (2013)
- With Doom We Come (2018)

=== EPs ===
- Nightshade Forests (1997)
- Lost Tales (2003)

=== Singles ===
- "With Doom I Come" (2017)

=== Compilation albums ===
- Sounds of Middle-Earth (2007)

=== Split albums ===
- The Urilia Text (1994, with Pazuzu)
- Creation of a Dark Age (1994, with Abigor, Pazuzu and Cromm)

=== Demos ===
- Upon the Viking Stallion (1993)
- Anno Mortui Domini (1994)
- Promo Tape (1994)

== Members ==
=== Current members ===
- Protector – guitars, vocals, keyboards, drum machine
- Silenius – bass, vocals, keyboards

=== Past members ===
- Trifixion – drums, vocals (1993-1995)
- Pazuzu – vocals (1993-1995)

== Related bands ==
Protector (Richard Lederer) is also a member of Die Verbannten Kinder Evas, a dark wave project, and Ice Ages, a kind of melodic EBM.

Silenius (Michael Gregor) is the creator and sole member of Kreuzweg Ost. He is also an active member of Amestigon, a pagan black metal band, as well as Shadow Vale and Mirkwood, both of which are darkwave ambient projects. He served as the vocalist for black metal band Abigor between 1994 and 1999.
