= Dawn of Disease =

German death metal band

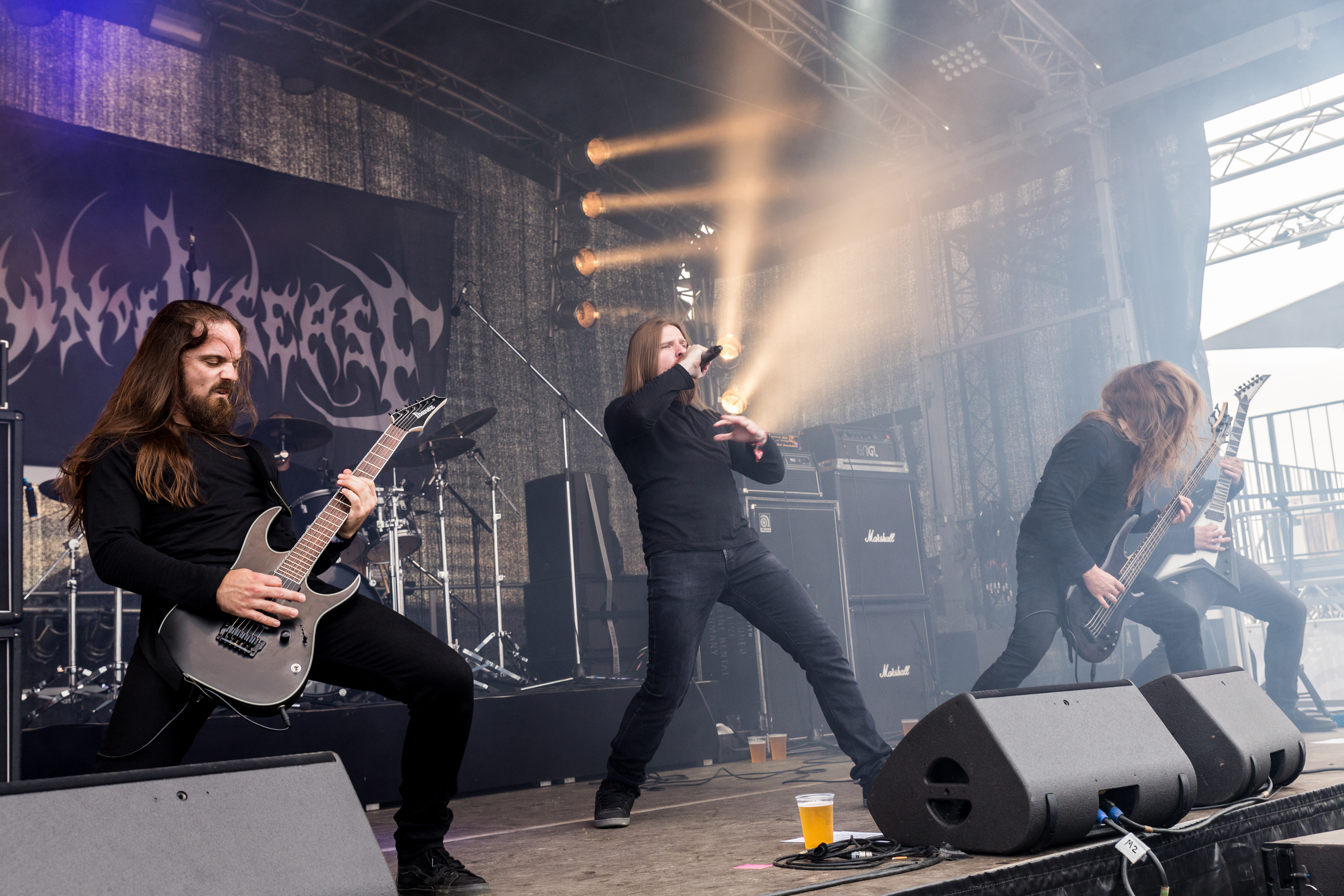
- Dawn of Disease at the Summer Breeze Open Air 2017

Background information
- Origin: Osnabrück, Germany
- Genres: Death metal; melodic death metal
- Years active: 2003–2007; 2009–2020
- Labels: Unstoppable Media; NoiseArt Records; Napalm Records
- Past members: See below

Dawn of Disease was a German death metal band from Osnabrück that was active between 2003 and 2007 and again from 2009 to 2020. Throughout their career, the band had released five studio albums, one compilation album and one EP.

== History ==
Dawn of Disease was formed in 2003 in Osnabrück, Lower Saxony, with singer Tomasz Wisniewski, guitarist Alex Miletic, bassist Sven Surendorf and drummer Sebastian Timper. A year later, they released their first EP, entitled Through Bloodstained Eyes. After touring with bands such as Fragments of Unbecoming, Vader or Suffocation, the group disbanded in 2007 undergoing several lineup changes.

In spring 2009, Wisniewski and drummer Mathias Blässe reformed Dawn of Disease. They were joined shortly after by guitarists Lukas Kerk and Oliver Kirchner. Shortly before the band recorded a four-song demo in November 2009, bassist Michael Wächter joined. In June 2010, they recorded their first studio album Legends of Brutality. Six months later, the band was signed by NoiseArt Records, which published the album. In January 2012, they recorded Crypts of the Unrotten at SoundLodge Studios which was released in April by NoiseArt.

In April 2016, Dawn of Disease released their song "Through Nameless Ages", from their third album, entitled Worship the Grave, released on 24 June on the label Napalm Records. In August 2017, they released their fourth studio album, entitled Ascension Gate. In November 2019, they released their fifth and final studio album, entitled Procession of Ghosts.

Dawn of Disease disbanded in 2020, following the departure of singer Tomasz Wisniewski who began to fully focus on Nyktophobia. The rest of Dawn of Disease bandmates then teamed up with singer Britta Görtz of Critical Mess under the name Hiraes.

== Musical style ==
Dawn of Disease played an aggressive form of death metal that can be described as a mixture of Entombed and Dew-Scented.

== Members ==
=== Final lineup ===
- Tomasz Wisniewski – vocals (2003–2007, 2009–2020)
- Mathias Blässe – drums (2006–2007, 2009–2014, 2017–2020)
- Lukas Kerk – guitar (2009–2020)
- Oliver Kirchner – guitar (2009–2020)
- Christian Wösten – bass (2016–2020)

=== Former members ===
- Sebastian Timper – drums (2003–2005)
- Sebastian Preuin – guitar (2006)
- Sven Surendorf – bass (2003–2007)
- Alex Miletic – guitar (2003–2007)
- Stephan "Stedi" Dittrich - guitar (2007)
- Christian Timmer – drums (2015–2017)
- Michael Wächter – bass (2009–2016)

== Discography ==
- 2004 : Through Bloodstained Eyes (EP)
- 2011 : Legends of Brutality (album)
- 2012 : Crypts of the Unrotten (album)
- 2016 : Worship the Grave (album)
- 2016 : Legends of the Unrotten (compilation)
- 2017 : Ascension Gate (album)
- 2019 : Procession of Ghosts (album)
