= Fractal Possession =

Studio album by Abigor
- Released: 2 May 2007 (EU); 5 June 2007 (United States)
- Genre: Black metal, avant-garde metal, industrial metal
- Length: 52:44
- Label: End All Life Productions (EU); Season Of Mist (United States)

Abigor chronology
Satanized (A Journey Through Cosmic Infinity) (2001)	Fractal Possession (2007)	Time Is the Sulphur in the Veins of the Saint (2010)

Professional ratings
Review scores
Source	Rating
Chronicles of Chaos	6.5/10 stars
Metal Temple	5/10 stars

Fractal Possession is the seventh studio album by Austrian black metal band Abigor. It was released worldwide in 2007.

== Track listing ==
All lyrics are written by AR, PK; all music is composed by PK, TT.

No.	Title	Length
1.	"Warning"	1:53
2.	"Project: Shadow"	5:38
3.	"Cold Void Choir"	6:13
4.	"Lair of Infinite Desperation"	6:07
5.	"3D Blasphemy"	5:43
6.	"The Fire Syndrome"	5:51
7.	"Injection Satan"	4:25
8.	"Liberty Rises a Diagonal Flame"	5:05
9.	"Vapourized Tears"	5:10
10.	"Heaven Unveiled"	6:39

== Credits ==
- A.R. (Arthur Rosar) - Vocals
- P.K. (Virus 666, Peter Kubik) - Guitars, Bass
- T.T. (Thomas Tannenberger) - Drums, Guitars
