= Kreuzweg Ost =

Austrian band

Kreuzweg Ost is an Austrian darkwave/martial industrial project founded by Michael Gregor and Martin Schirenc. The music is a blend of world war-related samples and loops with booming sounds and instrumental pieces. There are no vocals; instead, the predominant samples are arranged so that they take the role of vocals, sometimes telling short stories similar to radio play snippets. Martin Schirenc, of Austrian death metal band Pungent Stench, left the group shortly after the release of the Iron Avantgarde album and was replaced by programmer Ronald Albrecht and producer/sound engineer Oliver Stummer. Michael Gregor is a member of the Austrian black metal band Summoning and is also known as Silenius. Oliver Stummer has also released as Tomoroh Hidari and his Namelessness Is Legion.

== Motives ==
Kreuzweg Ost's concept is about making musical translations of various movies dealing with military or religious topics. The selection of films includes literature adaptations, along with other films.

== Discography ==
- Iron Avantgarde (album, 2000, Napalm Records)
- Edelrost (album, 2005, Cold Spring Records)
- Gott Mit Uns (album, 2012, Cold Spring Records)

== Notes ==
- Track 5 on Edelrost, entitled "Eiserne Menschen" (English: "Iron Men") uses spoken word samples from the German film Mädchen in Uniform from 1931.
- There are two (known) unreleased tracks from Edelrost, "Geierwally" and "Ein Neuer Krieg". "Ein Neuer Krieg" was used on a compilation CD for Cold Spring.
