= Richard Lederer (musician) =

- Also known as: Protector
- Born: 10 June 1971 (age 54)
- Origin: Austria
- Genres: Dark ambient, black metal, darkwave, electronic music, industrial metal, dungeon synth
- Occupations: Musician, composer
- Instruments: Vocals, guitar, keyboard, darbuka, bass guitar
- Years active: 1993–present
- Labels: Napalm Records

Richard Lederer (born 10 June 1971), who often performs as Protector, is an Austrian metal musician most notable for being a member in the bands Summoning, Die Verbannten Kinder Evas, and Ice Ages. He also does the artwork for some of the albums that he plays music in.

== Discography ==
=== With Summoning ===
- Lugburz (full-length, 1995)
- Minas Morgul (full-length, 1995)
- Dol Guldur (full-length, 1996)
- Nightshade Forests (EP, 1997)
- Stronghold (full-length, 1999)
- Let Mortal Heroes Sing Your Fame (full-length, 2001)
- Lost Tales (EP, 2003)
- Oath Bound (full-length, 2006)
- Old Mornings Dawn (full-length, 2013)
- With Doom We Come (full-length, 2018)

=== With Die Verbannten Kinder Evas ===
- Die Verbannten Kinder Evas (full-length, 1995)
- Come Heavy Sleep (full-length, 1997)
- In Darkness Let Me Dwell (full-length, 1999)
- Dusk and Void Became Alive (full-length, 2006)

=== With Ice Ages ===
- Strike the Ground (full-length, 1997)
- This Killing Emptiness (full-length, 2000)
- Buried Silence (full-length, 2008)
- Nullify (full-length, 2019)
- Vibe of Scorn (full-length, 2021)
- Coma (full-length, 2023)
- Parasiting Dreams (full-length, 2024)

=== With WeltenBrand ===
- Das Nachtvolk (full-length, 1997)

=== With Whispers in the Shadow ===
- Laudanum (full-length, 1997)
- November (full-length, 1999)

=== With Sanguis et Cinis ===
- Schicksal (full-length, 1996)
- Unfreiwillig Abstrakt (EP, 1997)
