= Fighter V =

Swiss melodic rock band

- Also known as: FIGHTER V
- Origin: Hergiswil, Switzerland
- Genres: Melodic rock; Arena rock; Hard rock
- Years active: 2019–present
- Labels: Rock Attack Records / Cargo Records; Avalon Marquee (Japan)
- Members: Emmo Acar; Felix Commerell; Lucien Egloff; Roman Stalder; Thomy Gunn
- Past members: Dave Niederberger; Marco Troxler; Luca Troxler; Andreas Grob
- Website: fighter-v.com

Fighter V is a Swiss melodic rock band, formed in 2019 in Hergiswil. Their sound is influenced by the 80s hard rock and arena rock with bands like Whitesnake, Journey, Survivor and Bon Jovi. The band has played several headliner shows across Central Europe and performed as the support act for various rock bands like The Dead Daisies, Fozzy, Bonfire, Shakra, The New Roses, John Diva & the Rockets of Love and Kissin' Dynamite. Their current album Fighter was released in October 2019 via Rock Attack Records and Avalon Marquee (Japan).

== History ==
In 2019 the group was founded by the former members of the hair rock band Haïrdrÿer (Luca Troxler, Dave Niederberger, Felix Commerell, Lucien Egloff, Marco Troxler).

Their debut album Fighter was released on October 11, 2019 on the label Rock Attack Records with worldwide distribution by Cargo Records. It was recorded in Sweden with producer Jona Tee, keyboardist of the Swedish hard rock band H.E.A.T, in spring 2019. The album was positively reviewed by various magazines and webzine such as Metal Planet Music, Stormbringer.at and Classic Rock. The release was followed by an extensive tour through Central Europe from October 2019 to May 2020, among others as the support act for The New Roses and Kissin' Dynamite. Their announced support tour with Axel Rudi Pell in spring 2020, as well as several festival shows have been postponed to 2022 due to the COVID-19 pandemic.

Music videos were produced for the single releases City Of Sinners, Dangerous, Fighter and Can't Stop The Rock.

On 22 January 2020, the band released a special edition of their album Fighter for the Japanese market on the label Marquee Avalon. The Japan edition contains an exclusive acoustic version of their song Dangerous as a bonus track.

Due to ongoing voice problems (sulcus vocalis), front singer Dave Niederberger announced his departure from the band in spring 2021. The situation then led to the departure of guitar player Marco Troxler and bass player Luca Troxler. The remaining members Felix Commerell and Lucien Egloff decided to continue the band with Emmo Acar as their new lead singer. He was introduced in August 2021 with an acoustic video of their song Save your love for me. In September 2021, the band announced Andreas Grob on guitar and Roman Stalder on bass as their new members. However, Andreas Grob left the band after half a year due to work-related circumstances. According to his statement, the enormous time and effort that comes along with the band were the reason for his resignation. He was replaced by Thomy Gunn, who played his first shows with Fighter V in spring 2022.

With the new lineup, Fighter V played several headliner shows starting in October 2021 and was part of the UrRock Music Festival 2021 together with bands like Nazareth and Girish and The Chronicles. The planned support tours with The New Roses in autumn 2021 and with Axel Rudi Pell in spring 2022 was canceled / postponed due to corona restrictions.

== Discography ==
=== Studio albums ===
Year	Album details
2019	FIGHTER: Release date: October 11, 2019; Producer: Jona Tee; Label: Rock Attack Records / Cargo Records; Tracks: 12; Format: CD, Vinyl
2020	FIGHTER (Japan Edition): Release date: January 22, 2020; Producer: Jona Tee; Label: Avalon / Marquee Inc.; Tracks: 12 + Bonus track; Format: CD
2024	HEART OF THE YOUNG: Release date: September 20, 2024; Producer: Thomas "Plec" Johansson; Label: Rock Attack Records / Cargo Records; Tracks: 12; Format: CD, Vinyl
2024	HEART OF THE YOUNG (Japan Edition): Release date: October 23, 2024; Producer: Thomas "Plec" Johansson; Label: Avalon / Marquee Inc.; Tracks: 12 + Bonus track; Format: CD
2026	DEJA VU: Release date: April 10, 2026; Label: Frontiers Music; Tracks: 11; Format: CD
2026	DEJA VU (Japan Edition): Release date: April 10, 2026; Label: Ward Records; Tracks: 11 + Bonus track; Format: CD

=== Singles ===
Year	Title	Album
2019	City of Sinners	FIGHTER
2019	Dangerous	FIGHTER
2020	Fighter	FIGHTER
2021	Can't Stop The Rock	FIGHTER
2023	Eye To Eye	HEART OF THE YOUNG
2023	Heart Of The Young	HEART OF THE YOUNG
2024	Power (feat. JOHN DIVA)	HEART OF THE YOUNG
2024	Radio Tokyo	HEART OF THE YOUNG

== Videography ==
=== Music videos ===
Year	Song	Album
2019	City Of Sinners	FIGHTER
2019	Dangerous	FIGHTER
2020	Fighter	FIGHTER
2021	Can't Stop The Rock	FIGHTER
2021	Into The Night	FIGHTER
2023	Eye To Eye	HEART OF THE YOUNG
2023	Heart Of The Young	HEART OF THE YOUNG
2024	Power (feat. JOHN DIVA)	HEART OF THE YOUNG
2024	Radio Tokyo	HEART OF THE YOUNG

=== Live videos ===
Year	Song	Album
2020	Frontline	FIGHTER
2021	Save Your Love For Me (Acoustic version)	FIGHTER

== Members ==
Current

- Felix Commerell - synthesizer, keyboards (2019–present)
- Lucien Egloff - drums (2019–present)
- Emmo Acar - vocals (2021–present)
- Roman Stalder - bass (2021–present)
- Thomy Gunn - guitar (2022–present)

Former

- Dave Niederberger - vocals (2019 - 2021)
- Marco Troxler - guitar (2019 - 2021)
- Luca Troxler - bass (2019 - 2021)
- Andreas Grob - guitar (2021 - 2022)
