= Vulvarine =

Austrian rock band

Vulvarine is an Austrian retro-rock band. They have released two albums, one of which on Napalm Records.

The band was formed in Vienna in 2019, and released their first record Unleashed on a small label in 2020. Following with the EP Witches Brew in 2024, the group was signed to Napalm Records for their second full-length album.

Their first release on Napalm Records was 2025's Fast Lane. It included a cover version of "Cheri, Cheri Lady". Metal Temple gave Fast Lane a perfect 10 score. In the German-speaking world, the record both received strong reviews such as a 5 ouf of 7 from Metal Hammer Germany and moderately good reviews such as 6.5 from Powermetal.de and 7.5 from Rock Hard. Fast Lane spent one week in the Austrian charts, at #10, and similarly one week in the Offizielle Deutsche Charts, at #59.

In 2025 the band toured with Thundermother. Festival gigs include Summer Breeze Open Air 2026 In 2026, the band was also nominated for best "hard & heavy" group as a part of the Amadeus Austrian Music Awards, and won the award.

The band should not be confused with an earlier Finnish band of the same name.
