= Cvlt Ov The Svn =

Finnish metal band

- Origin: Finland
- Genres: occult rock, gothic rock, black metal
- Years active: 2018-present
- Website: https://label.napalmrecords.com/cvlt-ov-the-svn

Cvlt Ov The Svn (also known as COTS or the more conventional spelling Cult of the Sun) is a Finnish metal band combining black metal with pop-music and supernatural themes, often described as occult rock.

== Biography ==
Cvlt Ov The Svn call their music genre "Occult Murder Pop" and have remained anonymous due to being "musicians of renown in Finland". Cvlt Ov The Svn are signed with Napalm Records and debuted with the single The Murderer in 2018 followed by another single Whore Of Babylon in the same year. They released their debut full-length album in 2021 titled We Are The Dragon, which obtained 4 out of 5 star reviews from both Soundi and Inferno.

The nameless leader of the band has mentioned thematic influence by movies such as The Exorcist and The Ninth Gate, as well musical inspiration by bands such as Type O Negative, Marilyn Manson, Turbonegro, Ghost, Pantera, Backyard Babies, and even Roxette, and that his musical background stems from being a black metal drummer.

== Discography ==
Adapted from Bandcamp, and Spotify.

=== Albums ===
- We Are The Dragon (May 2021, Napalm Records)

=== Singles ===
- The Murderer (October 2018)
- Whore Of Babylon (December 2018)
- You Could Be Mine (April 2023)
- Square Hammer (October 2023)

=== Music videos ===
- The Pit (May 2019)
- Luna in the Sky Forever (September 2019)
- My Venom (March 2021)
- A Possessione Diabolica (September 2025)
