= Dominion III =

Austrian band

Dominion³
- Origin: Austria
- Genres: Industrial music
- Years active: 1998–present
- Label: Napalm
- Members: Tharen; Elizabeth Toriser; Lanz

Dominion III is an Austrian industrial music band created in 1998.

== History ==
The band was started by Tharen (real name Alexander Opitz) in 1998 shortly after his other band, Dargaard, released their debut. Dominion III (also known as Dominion³ but this name is no longer used) was his expression into heavier industrial music to express his feelings. As with Dargaard, it also features the vocals of Elisabeth Toriser.

Tharen dubbed the music "apocalyptic electronic music" with their debut release The Hand and the Sword. The music was expressive and heavy, and dealt with dark and angry themes. Tharen's music often displays traits of this, coming from a black metal background. The band was signed to Napalm Records as were Tharen's other musical projects.

Their second release, Life Has Ended Here, came two years after The Hand and the Sword. The music displayed a more industrial edge and was far more guitar-driven. This was because of the addition to the line-up of Jörg Lanz, who was in Tharen's black metal band Amestigon. The music continued to display an aggressive nature combined with sinister soundscapes.

Tharen has spoken of moving Dominion III to another record label, one more centered on industrial music. In 2006, Dominion III left Napalm Records.

== Current line-up ==
- Tharen – composer, vocals
- Elisabeth Toriser – vocals
- Jörg Lanz – guitar/bass (on Life Has Ended Here)

== Discography ==
- The Hand and the Sword (2000)
- Life Has Ended Here (2002)
