= Die Verbannten Kinder Evas =

- Origin: Vienna, Austria
- Genres: Darkwave, neoclassical dark wave, dungeon synth
- Years active: 1993 - present
- Labels: Napalm Records
- Spinoff of: Summoning
- Members: Richard Lederer (Protector); Christina Kroustali (Lady of Carnage)
- Past members: Michael Gregor (Silenius); Tania Borsky; Julia Lederer
- Website: http://www.dvke.info/

Die Verbannten Kinder Evas is an Austrian darkwave music project founded in 1993 by Richard Lederer and Michael Gregor, signed to Napalm Records.

== Biography ==
The band originally consisted of Protector and Silenius, members of the black metal band Summoning. Michael Gregor later left the band to focus on Summoning. The music is slow and melancholic, with clear female and male vocals, and with lyrics inspired by John Dowland and Percy Bysshe Shelley. In 2006 the band released their fourth album, Dusk and Void Became Alive, featuring a new lead singer, Christina Kroustali.

"Die Verbannten Kinder Evas" means "The Banished Children of Eve" (Latin: "Ad te clamamus exsules filii Hevæ"; English: To you do we cry, exiled children of Eve), from the hymn Salve Regina.

== Discography ==
- 1995: Die Verbannten Kinder Evas
- 1997: Come Heavy Sleep
- 1999: In Darkness Let Me Dwell
- 2006: Dusk and Void Became Alive

== Line-up ==
Current line-up

- Richard Lederer — synthesizer and vocals
- Christina Kroustali (Lady of Carnage) — vocals

Former members

- Michael Gregor — synthesizer and vocals
- Julia Lederer — vocals
- Tania Borsky — vocals
