= Abigor =

Austrian black metal band

- Origin: Vienna, Austria
- Genres: Black metal; avant-garde metal; industrial metal
- Years active: 1993–2003, 2006–present
- Labels: End All Life; Chaos Sacrum; Napalm
- Members: T.T. (Thomas Tannenberger); Silenius
- Past members: Tharen; Thurisaz; Stefan Fiori; A.R. (Arthur Rosar); P.K. (Peter Kubik)
- Website: abigor.at

Abigor is an Austrian black metal band formed in 1993. They are named after an upper demon of war in Christian demonology.

== History ==
Peter Kubik and Thomas Tannenberger formed the band in 1993. After releasing several demos, original vocalist Tharen (Alexander Opitz) left the band and was replaced with Silenius (Michael Gregor), who recorded vocals for all Abigor releases, but left in 1998 while they were recording their fifth album, Channeling the Quintessence of Satan. Thurisaz, who had been in thrash metal band Lost Victim with Tannenberger in the 1980s, replaced Silenius on the album. In late 1999, Tannenberger left the band because of personal problems and frustration with "the scene". After his departure, Abigor released two more albums before breaking up in 2003.

In April 2006, Kubik and Tannenberger reformed the band and released Fractal Possession a year later. The band was scheduled to release a split EP in 2008 with French black metal group Blacklodge, supposedly cooperating with Norwegian experimental artist Zweizz.

The band's earlier works were loosely inspired by J. R. R. Tolkien's The Lord of the Rings. The album cover on Orkblut – The Retaliation is a collage of two paintings by Lord of the Rings fantasy artist Ian Miller, while the album cover on Channeling the Quintessence of Satan was made by German printmaker/artist Albrecht Dürer. (The Knight, Death and the Devil, 1514)

Most of Abigor recordings were released by Napalm Records.

In a 2007 interview, Kubik explained the band's songwriting process:

"T.T. [Tannenberger] and I are responsible for the music, A.R. [Arthur Rosar] will do the lyrics and vocals, that's how it works. I create riffs and record it, T.T. too, we send us files, create rough song-structures till we're satisfied with the result of a song/album "concept" then we start the recordings at T.T.'s Hell-Lab Studio."

In 2014, Silenius rejoined as a session musician, and then permanently in 2020.

On September 2, 2024, the band announced Kubik had died of suicide at 49 years old. The band said: "immortal in his legacy – blood (family), soil (home) and monuments of Black Metal art. walked through the gate by his own hand, through his own will".

== Personnel ==
- Thomas Tannenberger – bass, drums, guitar (1993–1999, 2006–present)
- Michael Gregor – vocals (1994–1999, session musician 2014–2020, 2020–present)

=== Former members ===
- Alexander Opitz – vocals (1993–1994), keyboards (1993–1998)
- Thurisaz – vocals (1999–2001)
- Moritz Neuner – drums (1999–2003)
- Stefano Fiori – vocals (2001–2003)
- Lukas Lindenburger – drums (2006)
- Sethnacht Eligor – vocals (2006)
- Arthur Rosar – vocals (2006–2014)
- Peter Kubik – guitar, bass (1993–2003, 2006–2024; his death)

== Discography ==
=== Albums ===
- Verwüstung – Invoke the Dark Age (1994)
- Nachthymnen (From the Twilight Kingdom) (1995)
- Opus IV (album)|Opus IV (1996)
- Supreme Immortal Art (1998)
- Channeling the Quintessence of Satan (1999)
- Satanized (A Journey Through Cosmic Infinity) (2001)
- Fractal Possession (2007)
- Time Is the Sulphur in the Veins of the Saint – An Excursion on Satan's Fragmenting Principle (2010)
- Leytmotif Luzifer (The 7 Temptations of Man) (2014)
- Höllenzwang (Chronicles of Perdition) (2018)
- Four Keys to a Foul Reich (2019)
- Totschläger – (A Saintslayer's Songbook) (2020)
- Taphonomia Aeternitatis (Gesänge im Leichenlicht der Welt) (2023)

=== EPs ===
- Orkblut – The Retaliation (1995, re-released 2006)
- Apokalypse (1997)
- Structures of Immortality (7" vinyl, 1998)
- In Memory... (2000)
- Shockwave 666 (Dark Horizon Records, 2004)

=== Demos ===
- Ash Nazg... (1993)
- Lux Devicta Est (1993)
- In Hate and Sin (1994)
- Promo Tape II/94 (1994)
- Moonrise (1994)

=== Re-issues ===
- Origo Regium 1993–1994 (demos re-release, 1998)
- Nachthymnen + Orkblut (remastered two albums on one CD, 2004)
- Verwüstung + Opus IV (remastered double CD, 2004)
