= Napalm Records =

Austrian record label

- Founded: 1992
- Founder: Markus Riedler
- Distributor: The Orchard
- Genre: Heavy metal; hard rock
- Country of origin: Austria
- Location: Eisenerz, Styria
- Official website: label.napalmrecords.com

Napalm Records is an Austrian independent record label focused on heavy metal, hard rock and folk/folk rock/folk metal. Originally, Napalm focused on black metal bands, such as Abigor and Summoning, and folk metal bands, such as Falkenbach and Vintersorg. The label later expanded its roster by adding gothic metal, symphonic metal, power metal, doom metal, metalcore and nu metal bands, as well as stoner rock acts Monster Magnet, Karma to Burn and Brant Bjork, thrash metal bands Exodus, Destruction and Flotsam and Jetsam, and even folk bands like Ye Banished Privateers. Napalm has its own publishing house named Iron Avantgarde Publishing.

In November 2020, Napalm acquired the German record label SPV GmbH.

== Roster ==
- 1914
- Æther Realm
- Accept
- Ad Infinitum
- Adept
- Agathodaimon
- Ahab
- Alestorm
- Alien Weaponry
- Alter Bridge
- Amberian Dawn
- Ambush
- Angus McSix
- Arkona
- As I Lay Dying
- Audrey Horne
- Be'lakor
- Before the Dawn
- Black Mirrors
- Bloodbath
- Bodom After Midnight
- Bomber
- Bornholm
- BPMD
- The Brew
- Brymir
- Burning Witches
- Candlemass
- Civil War
- Coal Chamber
- Cold
- Conan
- Cradle of Filth
- Crimson Shadows
- Crypta
- The Dark Side of the Moon
- Darkwoods My Betrothed
- Dawn of Disease
- Defacing God
- Dagoba
- Deadlock
- Delain
- Destruction
- DevilDriver
- Diabulus in Musica
- Dieth
- Dominum
- Draconian
- DragonForce
- Edge of Paradise
- Ektomorf
- Elvellon
- End of Green
- Evergrey
- Evile
- Evil Invaders
- Exit Eden
- Exodus
- Feuerschwanz
- Flotsam and Jetsam
- Frozen Crown
- John Garcia
- Gloryhammer
- Glowsun
- God Is an Astronaut
- Green Lung
- Grima
- Hällas
- Heidevolk
- The Hellfreaks
- Hinayana
- Hiraes
- IGNEA
- Infected Rain
- Jinjer
- Kamelot
- Katatonia
- Myles Kennedy
- Kissin' Dynamite
- Knife
- Kontrust
- Konvent
- League of Distortion
- Legion of the Damned
- Livlos
- Lord of the Lost
- Månegarm
- Manntra
- Me and That Man
- Megaherz
- Midnattsol
- Monkey3
- Monster Magnet
- Motanka
- Moonspell
- Mushroomhead
- My Sleeping Karma
- Nachtblut
- Nanowar of Steel
- Nervosa
- Nestor
- The New Roses
- Nile
- Nytt Land
- Oh Hiroshima
- Oomph!
- Paddy and the Rats
- Patriarkh
- Persefone
- Powerwolf
- Roadwolf
- Rumahoy
- Ryujin
- Samael
- Karl Sanders
- Satyricon
- Schandmaul
- Scott Stapp
- Self Deception
- Serenity
- Serum 114
- SETYØURSAILS
- Sevendust
- Shining
- Ryoji Shinomoto
- Shylmagoghnar
- Sirenia
- Skálmöld
- Dee Snider
- Space of Variations
- Stälker
- Stoned Jesus
- Stormruler
- Subway to Sally
- Suldusk
- Summoning
- Tailgunner
- Takida
- Temperance
- Tetrarch
- Therion
- Thulcandra
- Tiamat
- Tortuga
- Toxpack
- Tragedy
- Tremonti
- Trollfest
- The Night Flight Orchestra
- The Unguided
- Twilight Force
- Unleash the Archers
- Unleashed
- Untamed Land
- Uuhai
- Van Canto
- Varg
- Victorius
- Villagers of Ioannina City
- The Vintage Caravan
- Vintersorg
- Visions of Atlantis
- Vulvarine
- Andrew W.K.
- Warbringer
- Warfect
- Warfield
- Warkings
- W.A.S.P.
- Wednesday 13
- Charlotte Wessels
- Wizardthrone
- Alissa White-Gluz
- Wind Rose
- Wolftooth
- Xandria
- Ye Banished Privateers
- Year of the Goat

== Former artists ==
- 8kids
- Abigor
- Alunah
- American Head Charge
- Angizia
- The Answer
- The Agonist
- Ásmegin
- Atrocity
- Battlelore
- Belphegor
- Beseech
- Beyond the Black
- Bloody Hammers
- Bokassa
- Brant Bjork
- The Bulletmonks
- Cavalera Conspiracy
- Cobra Spell
- Cvlt Ov The Svn
- Dargaard
- Dark Sarah
- Darkwell
- Deadlock
- Death Dealer Union
- Die Kreatur
- Diemonds
- Die Verbannten Kinder Evas
- Dominion III
- Dragony
- Dropout Kings
- Dust Bolt
- Edenbridge
- Einherjer
- Elis
- Enthroned
- Ex Deo
- Fairyland
- Falkenbach
- Fejd
- Finsterforst
- F.K.Ü.
- Glittertind
- Gormathon
- HammerFall
- Grave Digger
- Hammer King
- Greenleaf
- Hate
- Hatesphere
- Heavatar
- Hoobastank
- Hollenthon
- Huntress
- Ice Ages
- In Battle
- Imperium Dekadenz
- Iron Fire
- Isole
- Jaldaboath
- Jungle Rot
- Kampfar
- Karma to Burn
- Katra
- Kobra and the Lotus
- Korpiklaani
- Lacrimas Profundere
- Leaves' Eyes
- Life of Agony
- Lunatica
- Majesty
- Mammoth Mammoth
- Marianas Rest
- Mehida
- The Midnight Ghost Train
- Mortemia
- Myriads
- Nemesea
- Nightmare
- Otep
- Otyg
- Paragon
- Power Quest
- Product of Hate
- Revolution Renaissance
- Russkaja
- Scar of the Sun
- Seven Kingdoms
- Siebenbürgen
- Silent Skies
- Seventh Void
- The Sins of Thy Beloved
- Skindred
- Skyblood
- The Smashing Pumpkins
- Sojourner
- Stream of Passion
- Stuck Mojo
- Sumo Cyco
- Svartsot
- There's A Light
- The Ugly Kings
- The Sword
- Trail of Tears
- Tristania
- Týr
- Valient Thorr
- Vesania
- Vexed
- Visceral Evisceration
- Vista Chino
- Walls of Jericho
- WeltenBrand
- Wolfheart
- Zodiac

== Distribution ==
- Universal Music Group (Germany, Austria, Switzerland)
- Warner Music Group (on behalf of ADA) (US)
- The Orchard (Canada, UK, Nordics)
