= List of folk metal bands =

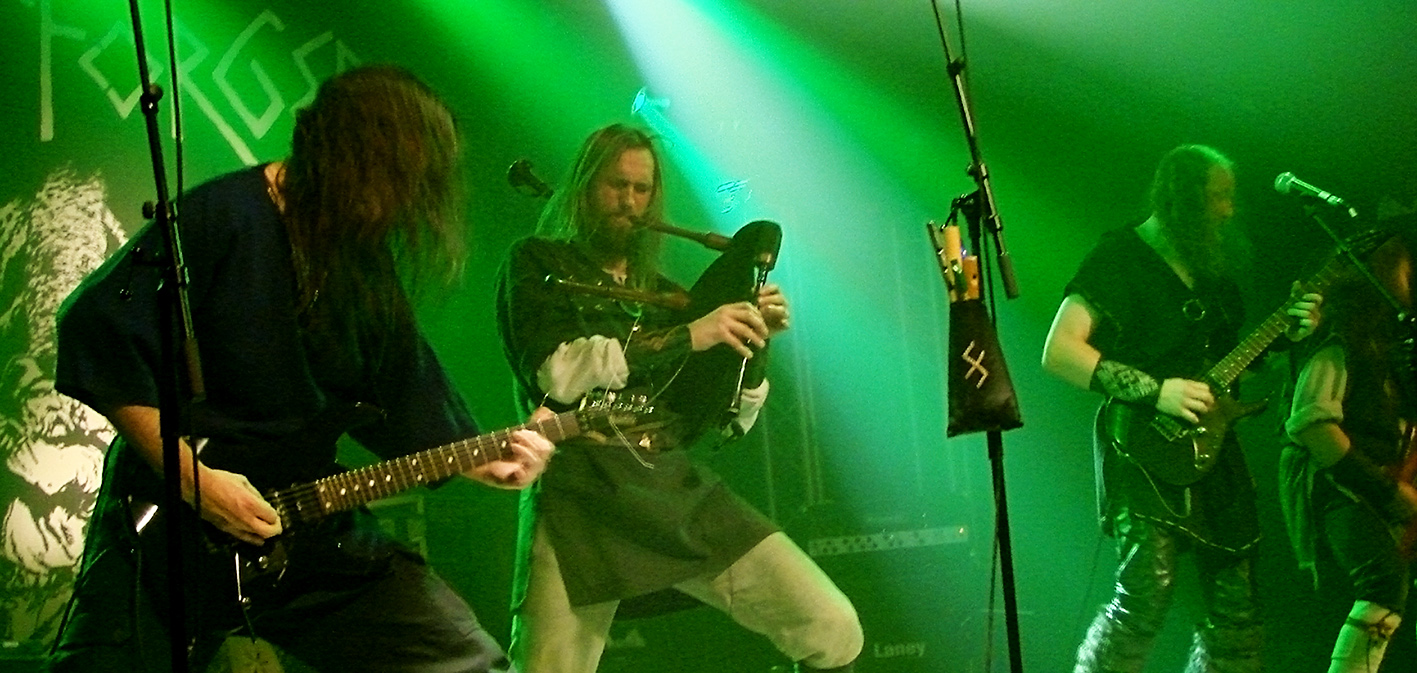
With a bagpiper in their lineup, Skyforger is an example of a folk metal band that performs with traditional folk instruments.

This is a list of notable folk metal bands. Folk metal is a fusion of heavy metal music and folk music that features widespread use of folk instruments and to a lesser extent traditional singing styles. The music of folk metal is characterised by its diversity with bands known to perform different styles of heavy metal music and folk music.

== List of bands ==
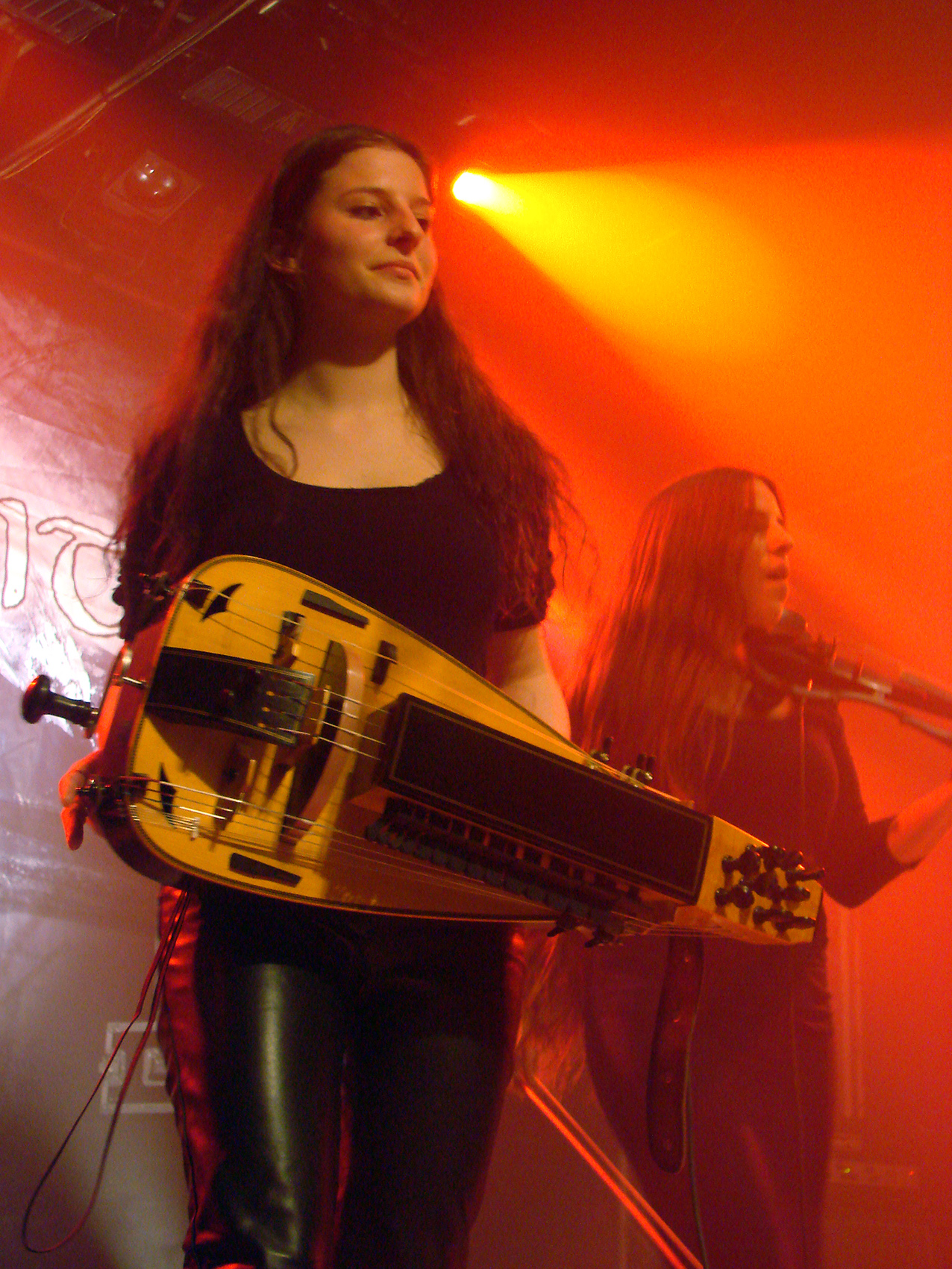
Anna Murphy (ex-Eluveitie; Cellar Darling) with a hurdy-gurdy

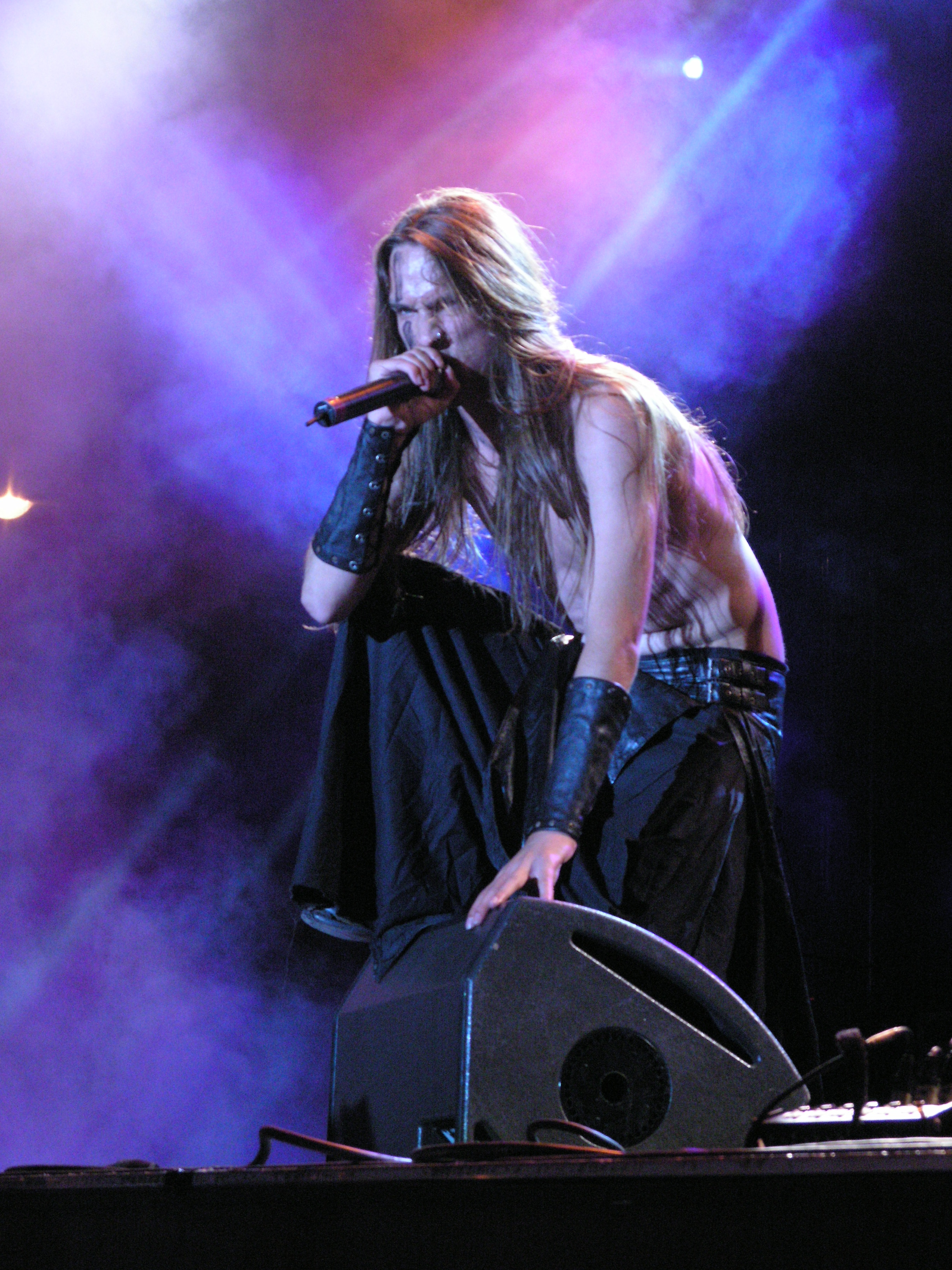
Vocalist Mathias Lillmåns of Finntroll

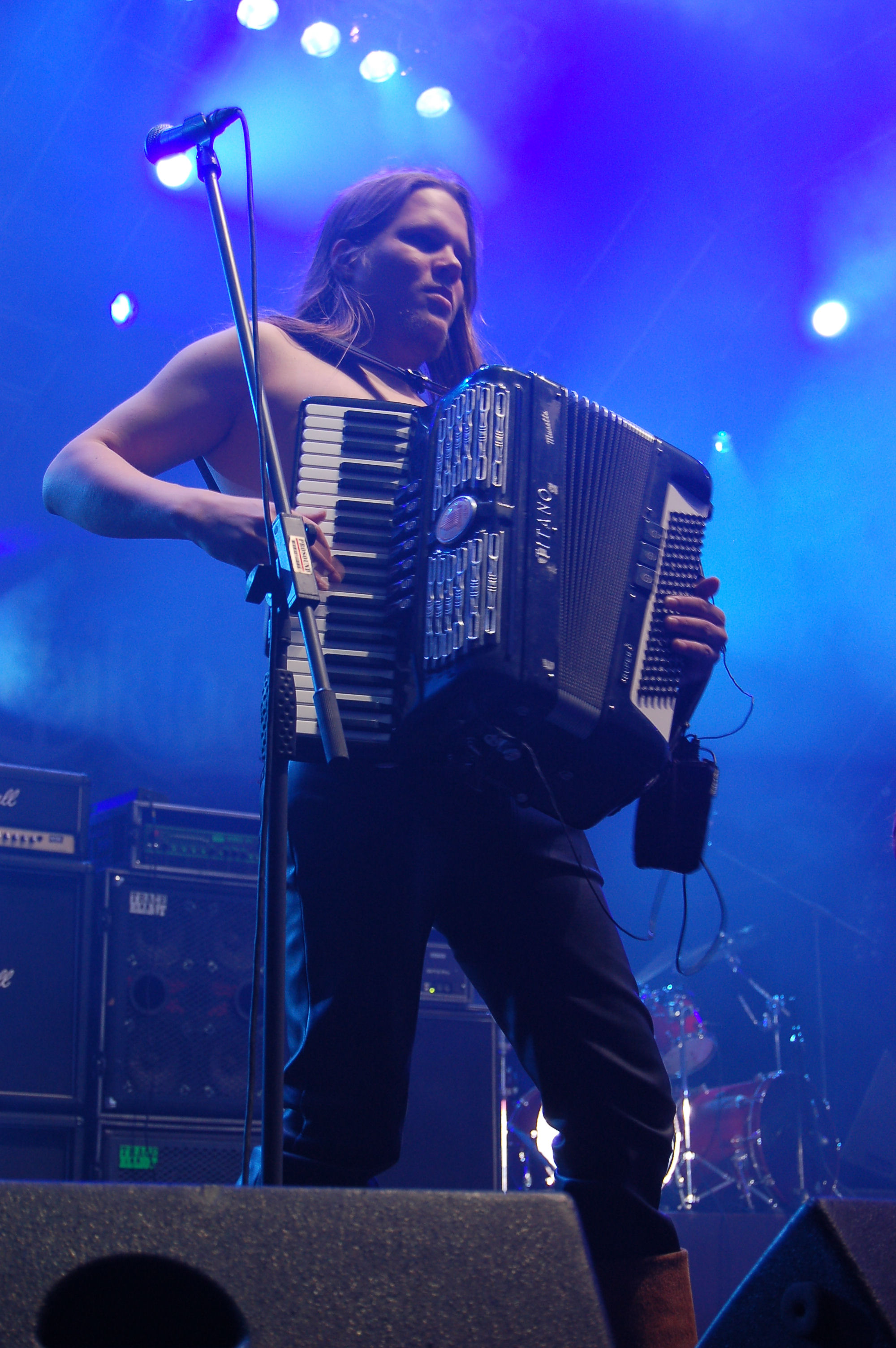
Juho Kauppinen of Korpiklaani on the accordion

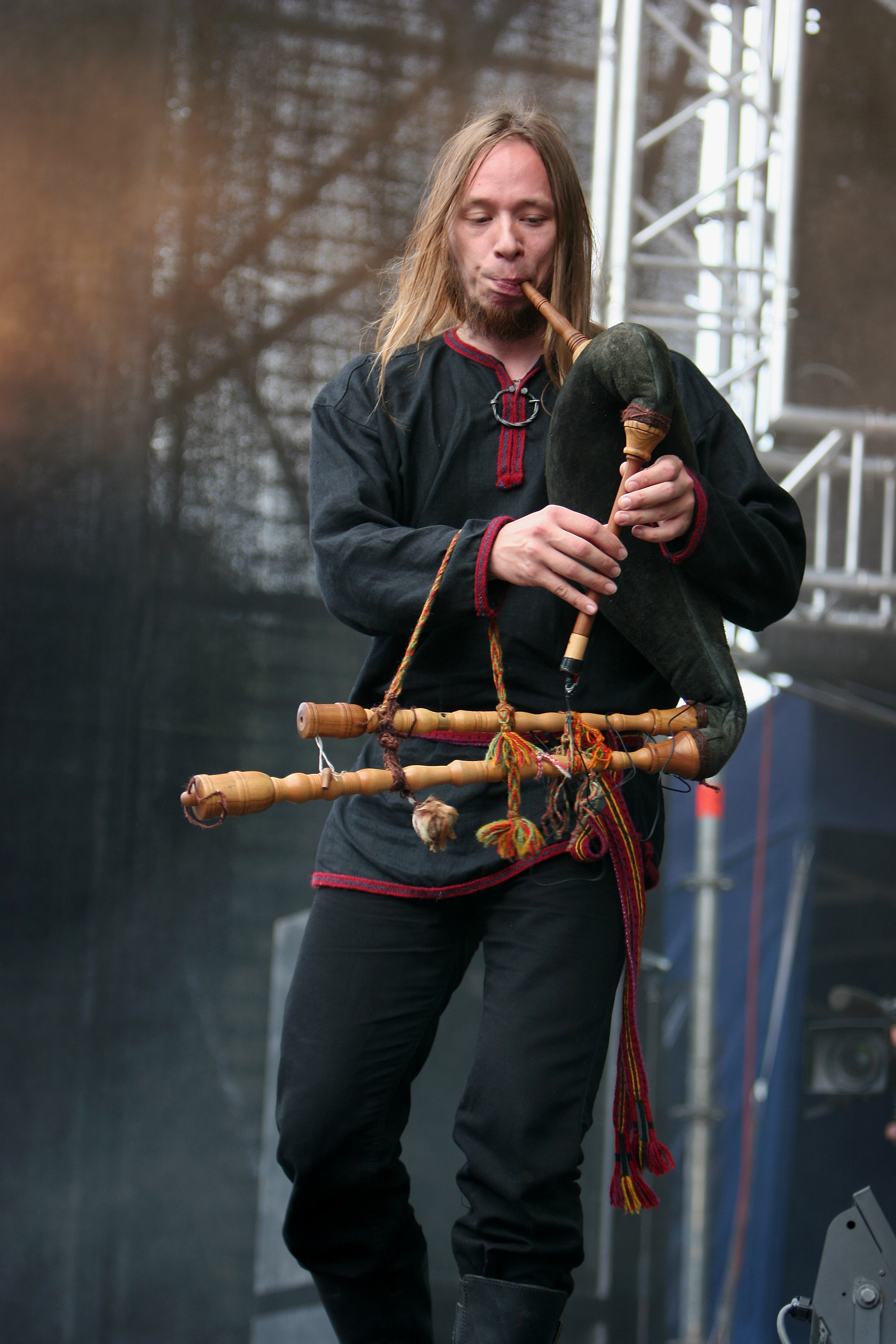
Lauri Õunapuu of Metsatöll with the torupill

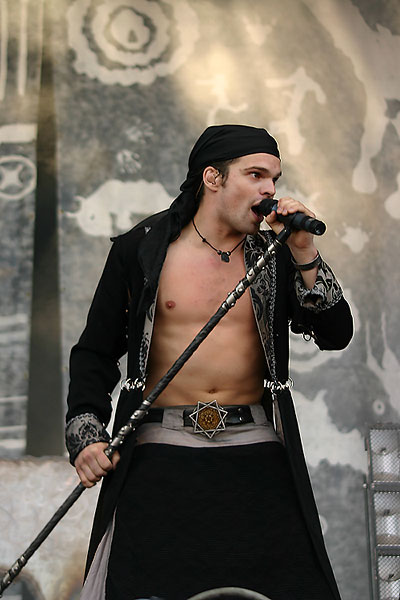
Alea der Bescheidene of Saltatio Mortis

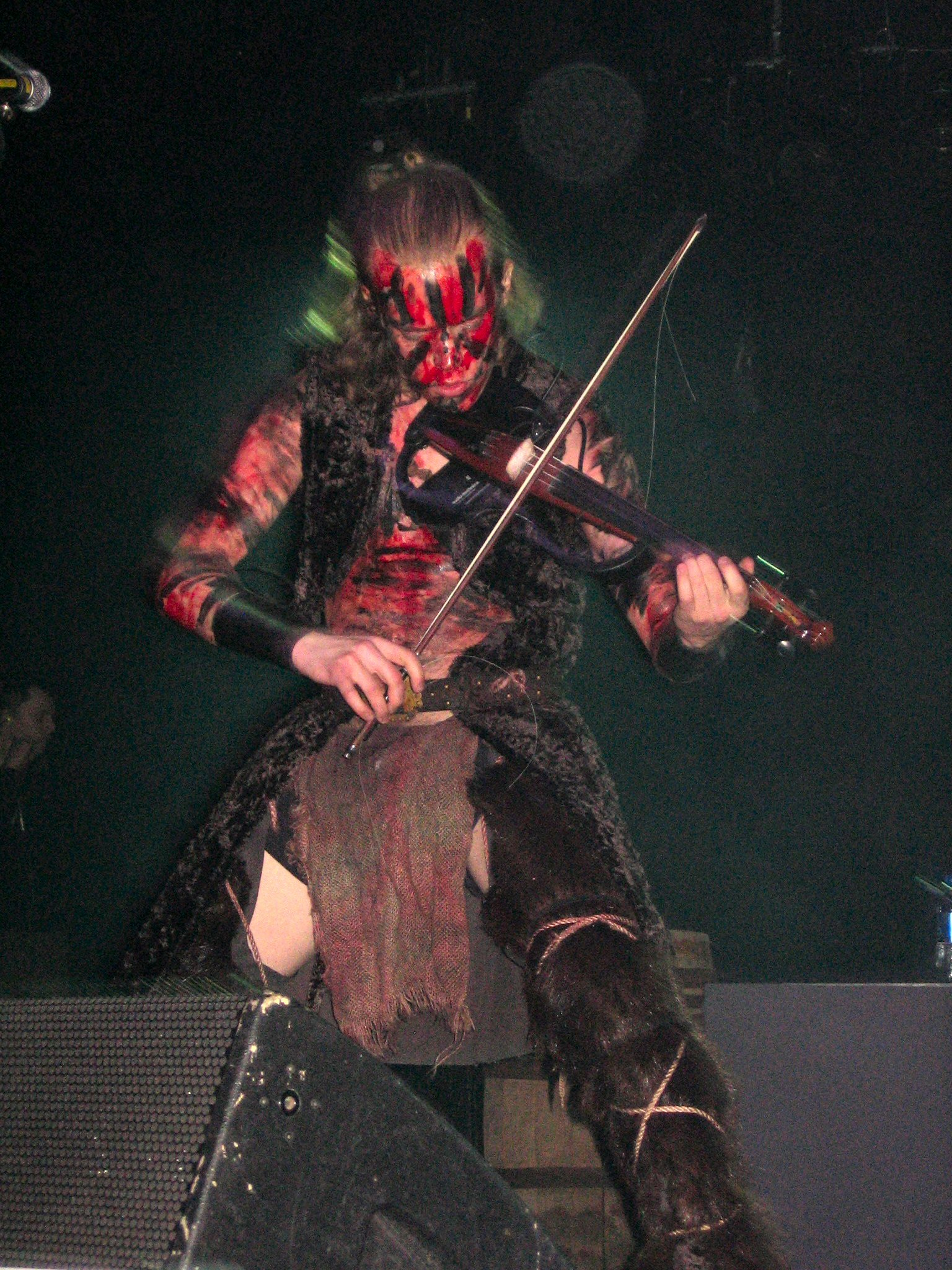
Olli Vänskä of Turisas

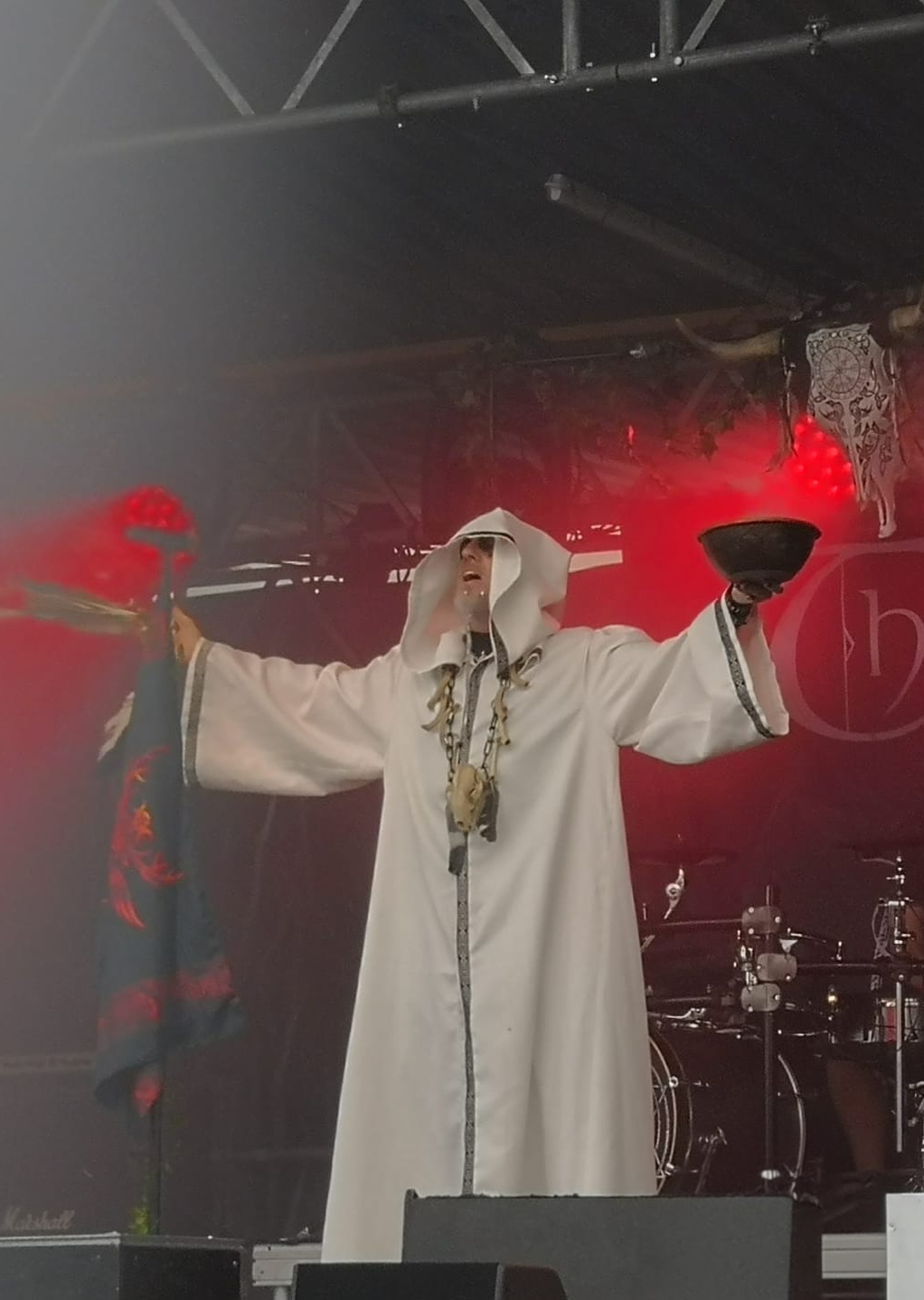
Ben Richter of Thanateros at the opening ritual

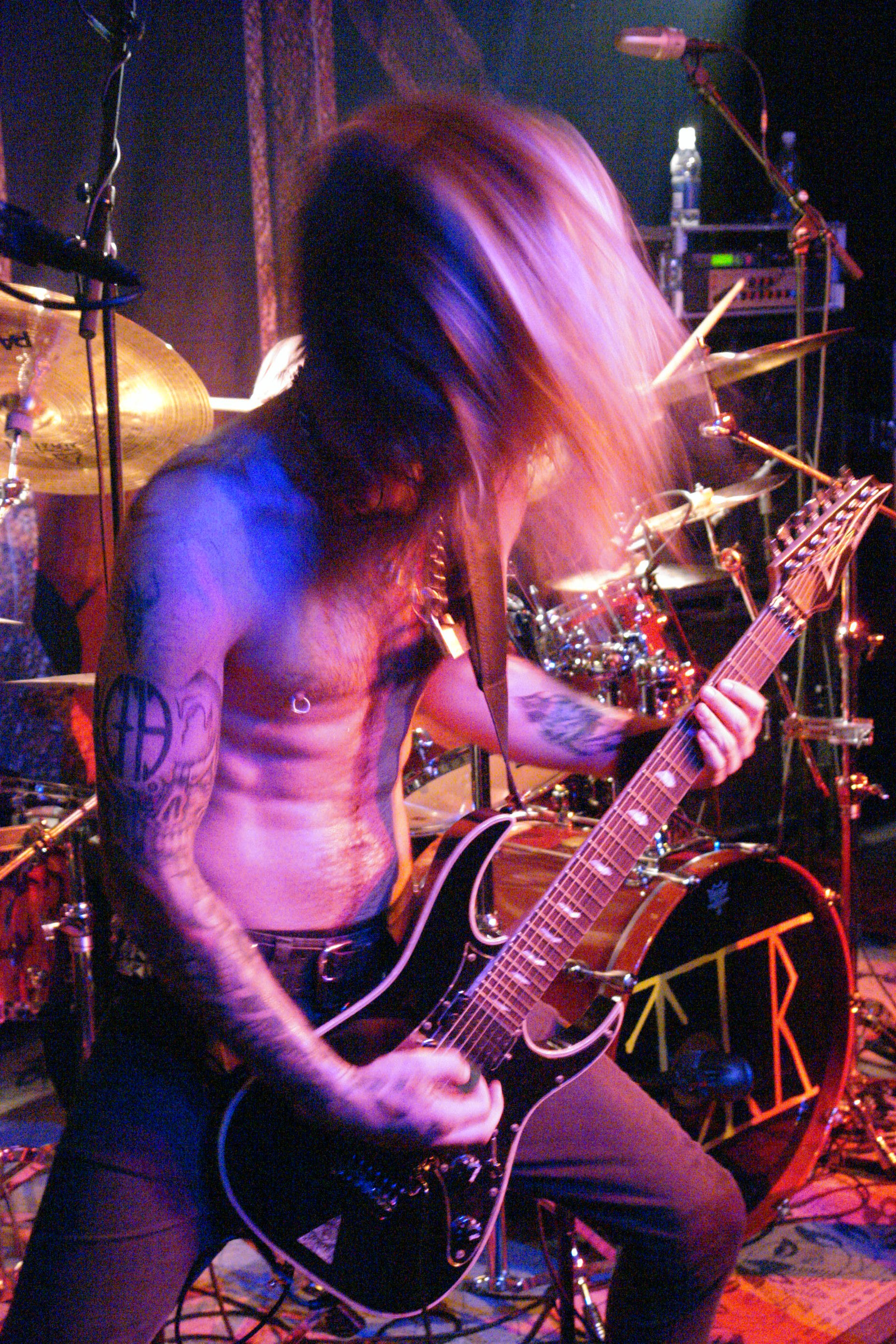
Terji Skibenæs of Týr

Band	Country	Formed	Notes
Agalloch	United States	1995	
Æther Realm	United States	2010	
Alestorm	Scotland	2004	
Al-Namrood	Saudi Arabia	2008	
Amorphis	Finland	1990	
Angizia	Austria	1994	
Arandu Arakuaa	Brazil	2008	
Аркона	Russia	2002	
Balkandji	Bulgaria	1999	
Bathory	Sweden	1983	
Battlelore	Finland	1999	
Blackguard	Canada	2001	
Bloodywood	India	2016	
Bucovina	Romania	2000	
Cadacross	Finland	1997	
Cellar Darling	Switzerland	2016	
Chthonic	Taiwan	1995	
Cruachan	Ireland	1992	
Dalriada	Hungary	1998	
Eluveitie	Switzerland	2002	
Elvenking	Italy	1997	
Empyrium	Germany	1994	
Ensiferum	Finland	1995	
Falconer	Sweden	1999	
Falkenbach	Germany	1989	
Finntroll	Finland	1997	
Finsterforst	Germany	2004	
Folkearth	International	2003	
Forefather	England	1997	
Geasa	Ireland	1994	
Glittertind	Norway	2001	
Heidevolk	Netherlands	2002	
Holy Blood	Ukraine	1999	
Huldre	Denmark	2009	
In Extremo	Germany	1996	
Ithilien	Belgium	2005	
Kampfar	Norway	1994	
Kivimetsän Druidi	Finland	2002	
Korpiklaani	Finland	1993	
Leah	Canada	2011	
Letzte Instanz	Germany	1996	
Lumsk	Norway	1999	
Lyriel	Germany	2003	
Mael Mórdha	Ireland	1998	
Mägo de Oz	Spain	1989	
Metsatöll	Estonia	1998	
Midnattsol	Germany	2003	
Mithotyn	Sweden	1992	
Moonsorrow	Finland	1995	
Myrath	Tunisia	2001	
Nine Treasures	China	2010	
Obtest	Lithuania	1992	
Onmyo-Za	Japan	1999	
Orphaned Land	Israel	1991	
Percival Schuttenbach	Poland	1999	
Saltatio Mortis	Germany	2000	
Saurom	Spain	1996	
Schandmaul	Germany	1998	
Scythia	Canada	2010	
Skálmöld	Iceland	2009	
Skiltron	Argentina	2004	
Skyclad	England	1990	
Skyforger	Latvia	1995	
Slough Feg	United States	1990	
Storm	Norway	1994	
Storm Seeker	Germany	2013	
Subway to Sally	Germany	1992	
Suidakra	Germany	1994	
Summoning	Austria	1993	
Svartsot	Denmark	2005	
Tanzwut	Germany	1998	
Tengger Cavalry	United States	2010	
Thanateros	Germany	1999	
The HU	Mongolia	2016	
Thyrfing	Sweden	1995	
Trollfest	Norway	2003	
Tuatha de Danann	Brazil	1995	
Tumulus	Russia	1997	
Turisas	Finland	1997	
Týr	Faroe Islands	1998	
Varang Nord	Latvia	2014	
Vardøger	Norway	1994	
Vintersorg	Sweden	1994	
Waylander	Northern Ireland	1993	
Windir	Norway	1994	
Wind Rose	Italy	2009	
Wintersun	Finland	2004	
Wolfchant	Germany	2003	
Wuthering Heights	Denmark	1989	
Ymyrgar	Tunisia	2012	

== See also ==
- List of Celtic metal bands
- List of Viking metal bands
- List of heavy metal bands
- Heavy metal subgenres
