= Scythia (band) =

Canadian folk/progressive metal band

- Origin: Vancouver, British Columbia, Canada (2010–2013); Calgary, Alberta, Canada (2013–2018)
- Genre: Folk metal
- Years active: 2010–2018
- Members: Dave Khan; Terry Savage; Morgan Zentner; Celine Derval
- Website: www.scythia.ca

Scythia is a Canadian folk/progressive metal band. In 2008, lead singer and guitarist Dave Khan formed a group based in Vancouver called Thorgen Hellhammer's Orc Rampage. Bassist Terry Savage joined the band at an open mic night. The group toured and recorded an album before breaking up. Scythia was formed soon afterwards. Savage was the only British Columbia native in the group. Khan grew up in Ontario and moved to British Columbia to attend university. Drummer Celine Derval was born in France, grew up in Montreal and came west with her family. Oboist Morgan Zentner was born in the United States and lived in Montreal for a while before moving west to attend school.

The band relocated to Calgary in 2013. Zentner left the group at that time. AJ "Ireheart" Bergin joined the group as a second guitarist in 2013. Keyboardist Jeff Black became the fifth member of the group.

Scythia was nominated for a SiriusXM Indie Award for Metal Group of the Year in 2013.

The group's 2013 video "Bear Claw Tavern" premiered on the Guitar World web site.

They have disbanded as of 2018.

== Members ==
- Dave Khan – lead vocals, guitar, songwriting
- Terry Savage – bass, vocals
- Celine Derval – drums, vocals

== Discography ==
- ... Of War (2010)
- ... Of Exile (2011)
- ... Of Conquest (2014)
- Lineage (2016)
