= Finsterforst =

German folk metal band

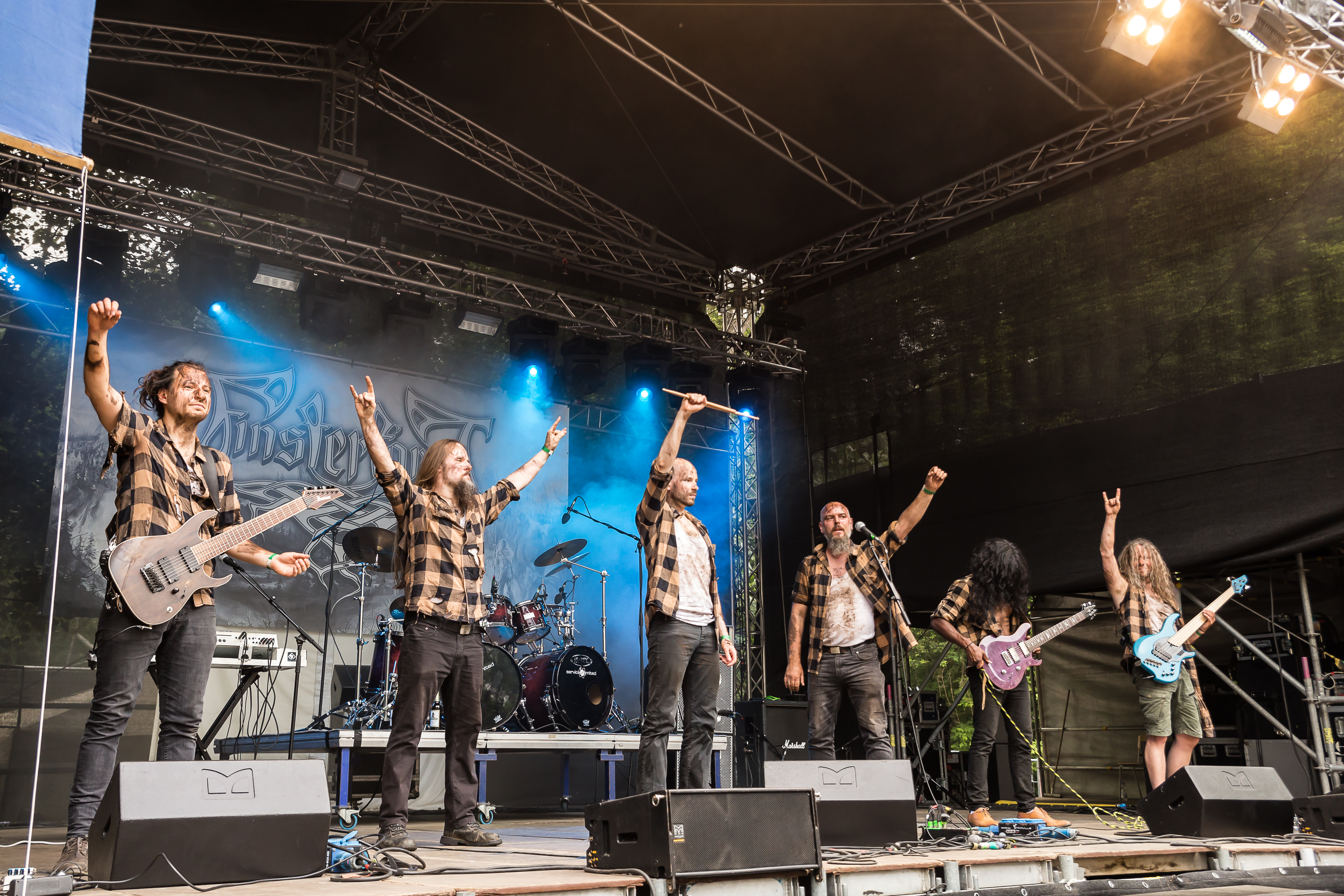
- Finsterforst at Wave-Gotik-Treffen 2022

Background information
- Origin: Schwarzwald, Germany
- Genres: Folk metal, pagan metal, black metal
- Years active: 2004–present
- Label: Napalm Records
- Members: Oliver Berlin; Tobias Weinreich; Cornelius "Wombo" Heck; Sebastian "AlleyJazz" Scherrer; David Schuldis; Simon Schillinger; Peter Hamm (live)
- Past members: Johannes Joseph; Marco Schomas; Stephan Stahl (live)
- Website: finsterforst.de

Finsterforst is a German folk metal band from Schwarzwald, Baden-Württemberg, whose lyrical themes deal with nature, German myths, and fantasy worlds. Formed in 2004, the group has released five studio albums, one extended play and one compilation album. Finsterforst means "dark forest" and it is a reference to "Schwarzwald" ("black forest"), a wooded mountain range in the band's home state.

Besides the usual line-up of instruments used in metal (guitar, bass, drums), the band's sound relies heavily on accordion melodies, with the occasional use of instruments such as the tin whistle and the oboe. The band's genre is often dubbed pagan metal because of its use of harsh vocals.

Several Finsterforst members also play in Cryptic Forest, a black metal band from Schwarzwald.

== History ==
=== Formation and Wiege der Finsternis (2004–2006) ===
The band was formed at the end of the year 2004 by Tobias Weinreich, Sebastian "AlleyJazz" Scherrer, Simon Schillinger and Marco Schomas. Because the line-up was not complete, the group decided to focus on songwriting.

Since the band felt it needed a real accordion-player, Johannes Joseph joined the line-up in the spring of 2005, followed by rhythm guitarist David Schuldis in October the same year.

In spite of missing a drummer, the band booked Iguana Studios in Buchheim, Baden-Württemberg, and, at the end of December 2005, three songs were recorded with the help of a drum machine. The songs were released as the Wiege der Finsternis EP in March 2006.

=== New drummer and Weltenkraft (2006–2008) ===
In October 2006, drummer Cornelius "Wombo" Heck joined the line-up, enabling the band to prepare for live shows.

In February and March 2007, the band re-entered Iguana Studios to record its debut album, Weltenkraft, which was released in July through World Chaos Productions.

=== ...zum Tode hin, new vocalist and Urwerk (2008–2011) ===
The band's second album, ...zum Tode hin, was recorded in July 2008 at Iguana Studios and was released through the German label Einheit Produktionen on 27 February 2009.

At the end of November 2009, the band announced the departure of Schomas and that they were searching for a new singer, a position which was filled by Oliver Berlin in 2010.

In May 2010, the band released Urwerk, a two-disc re-release of their first EP (with a bonus track) and their debut album.

=== Rastlos and record deal with Napalm Records (2012–2015) ===
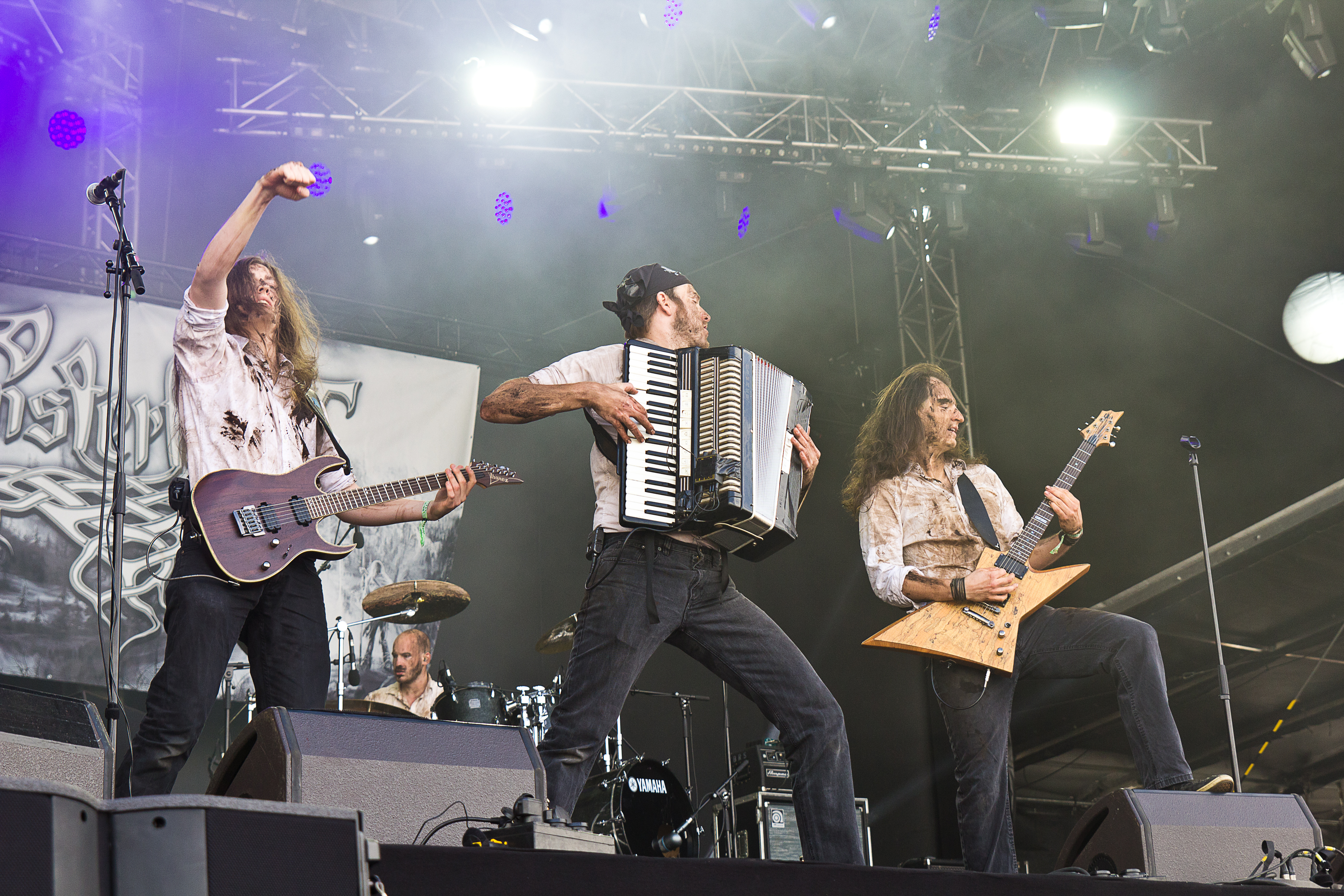
Finsterforst at Rockharz Open Air 2015

In September 2012, the band signed a new record deal with the Austrian record label Napalm Records. On 26 November 2012, the album Rastlos was released worldwide to positive reviews and it received various "album of the month" awards. For 2014, there was an announcement for a European Tour called "Trolls in the Forest bring Kaos over Europe", together with Trollfest and Cryptic Forest.

=== Mach dich frei, #YØLØ, Zerfall and Still (2015–present) ===
In early 2015, Finsterforst released their new studio album Mach dich frei. It was released on 23 January in Germany/Austria/Switzerland, 30 January in the rest of Europe, and on 10 February in North America. Also in 2015, vocalist and accordionist Johannes Joseph left the band.

In 2016, they released #YØLØ, which they refer to as an EP although they recognise some would call it an album.

On 2 August 2019, they released the album Zerfall. It has only five songs, ranging from 8 to 36 minutes – the latter being their longest track to date, "Ecce Homo". A lyric video for a shortened version of it was released in July 2019.

On July 31, 2026, the band released their sixth album, Still.

== Band members ==
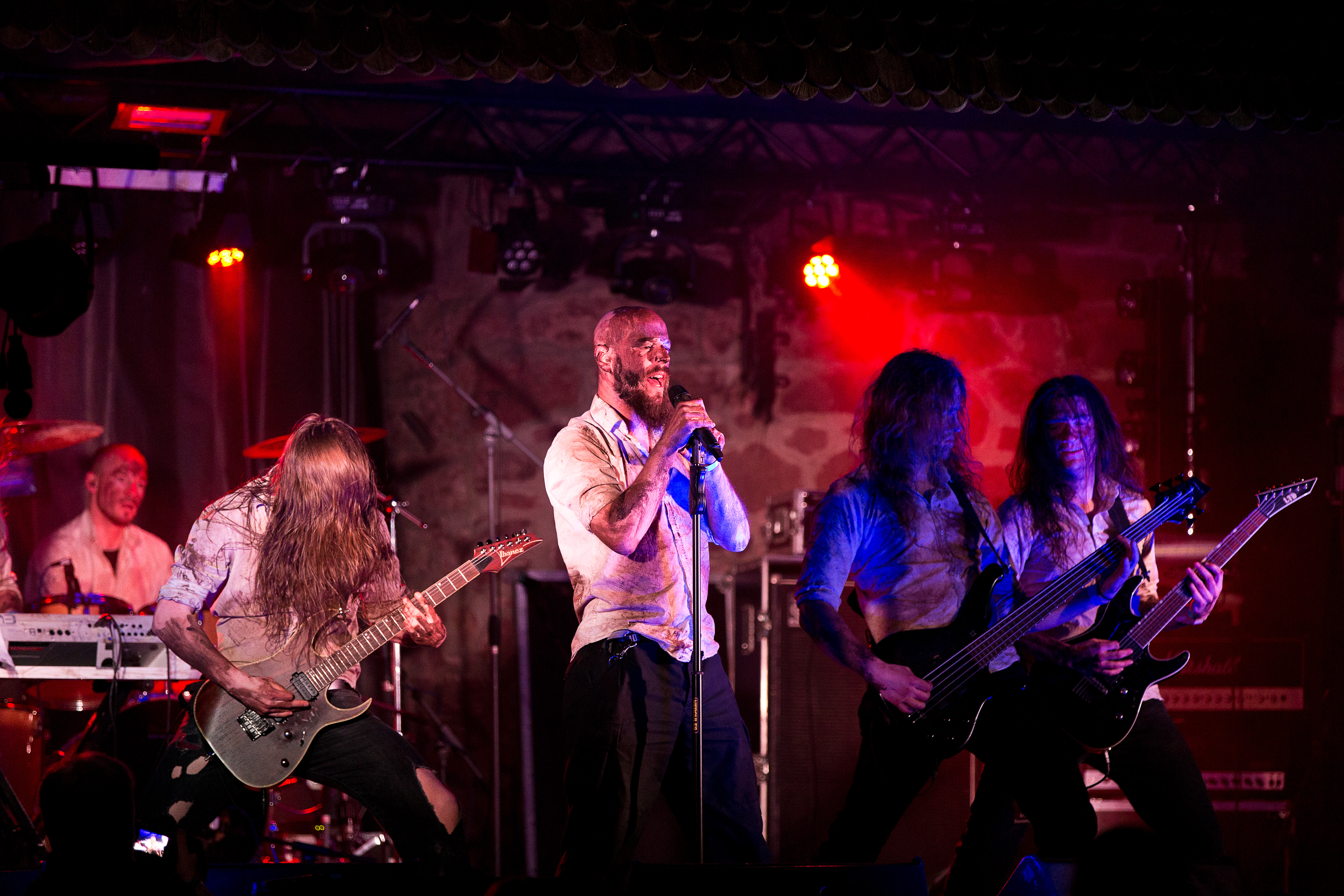
Finsterforst at Dark Troll Open Air 2016

Current

- Simon Schillinger – guitars (lead, rhythm, acoustic), keyboards, orchestrations, programming, vocals (choirs) (2004–present)
- Tobias Weinreich – bass (2004–present)
- Sebastian "AlleyJazz" Scherrer – keyboards (2004–present)
- David Schuldis – guitars (rhythm), bagpipes (2005–present)
- Cornelius "Wombo" Heck – drums, vocals (choirs) (2006–present)
- Oliver Berlin – lead and choir vocals (2010–present)

Former

- Marco Schomas – lead vocals, acoustic guitar (2004–2009)
- Johannes Joseph – accordion, vocals (lead, choirs) (2005–2015)

Timeline

== Discography ==
=== Studio albums ===
- Weltenkraft (2007)
- ...zum Tode hin (2009)
- Rastlos (2012)
- Mach dich frei (2015)
- Zerfall (2019)
- Still (2026)

=== EPs ===
- Wiege der Finsternis (2006)
- #YØLØ (2016)
- Jenseits (2023)

=== Compilation albums ===
- Urwerk (2010)

== Cryptic Forest (2003–2014) ==
In the beginning, in 2003, the band was only a one-man project by composer Simon Schillinger. A couple of songs came to life, but the project was later put on ice because Schillinger's writing focus was resting on his other band Finsterforst at the time. Although Cryptic Forest was officially not active, from time to time he wrote some music unrelated to Finsterforst and shared it with a couple of his friends, who should later encourage him to found a band and to record a short EP. The EP called Dawn of the Eclipse was released in 2011, which can be seen as the band's official founding. In August 2013, the debut album Ystyr was released on the German label Einheit Produktionen and a European Tour together with Trollfest and Finsterforst was announced for 2014.

=== Discography ===
- Dawn of the Eclipse (EP, 2011)
- Ystyr (2013)

== Concert tours ==
Date	Country/Region	City	Venue	Guest
Zerfall China Tour 2019
14 November 2019		Beijing	Mao Live House Beijing	Frozen Moon
15 November 2019		Nanjing	Ola Art Space	None
16 November 2019		Shanghai	YYT Live House	None
17 November 2019		Hangzhou	Mao Live House Hangzhou	None
18 November 2019		Suzhou	Hill House	None
20 November 2019		Shenzhen	B10 Live	None
21 November 2019		Guangzhou	Tu Space	None
23 November 2019		xi'an	Aperture Club	None

== See also ==
- List of folk metal bands
- List of Napalm Records artists
- Music of Germany
