= Tumulus (band) =

Russian folk metal band

- Origin: Yaroslavl, Russia
- Genres: Progressive metal, folk metal
- Years active: 1997–present
- Labels: Ygghdrassil Productions; 2S Productions; Wroth Emitter Productions
- Members: Kuchma; Velingor; Kurbat; Yish; Ottar
- Website: tumulus.ru

Tumulus is a Russian progressive folk metal band from Yaroslavl, Russia. They were formed from the ashes of cult doom metal/viking metal band Scald, after the death of Scald's frontman Agyl. From the beginning, Tumulus moved away from Scald's doom metal roots and played folk metal, combining metal music with traditional Russian folk and incorporated instruments as flute, tambourine and balalaika.

== History ==
Russian Tumulus (not to be confused with the German viking/pagan/black metal band Tumulus) was founded in the fall of 1997 in Yaroslavl, Russia by ex-members of cult doom metal/viking metal band Scald that split up due to the death of the singer and leader of the band Agyl. The name of the new band – Tumulus – is a tribute to his memory and also a title of one of the songs from “Will of the Gods is Great Power” album. Lyrics are written in Russian, ancient Slavonic and English. The lyrics is based on Slavonic spell formulas, rites and everyday magic (that mostly are traditions of northern regions of Russia). After recording two demos - “Krada” (1999) and “Vo Luzeh” (2000), Tumulus started co-operation with a Russian label Wroth Emitter Productions that released their studio albums “Winter Wood” (2004) and “Sredokresie” (2005). Guest vocals on both albums were performed by Marina Sokolova of a folk band Sedmaya Voda – a Russian folk songstresses. At the end of 2006, Tumulus went on their “Folk Art Path” tour and performed live in Russia, Ukraine, Romania and Bulgaria.

In early 2013, Tumulus has provided a free download three song single "Skomrah" (which includes a cover version of the cult Yugoslav folk rock band Bijelo Dugme). On official band page "V Kontakte" was officially announced that, from 2013, Tumulus is a studio project.

== Line up ==
=== Current members ===
- Kuchma – lead vocals, flute
- Velingor – bass, tambourine, percussion, backing vocals
- Kurbat – guitars, backing vocal
- Yish – guitars
- Ottar – drums & percussion
- Masha Chirkova – studio & concerts session female vocals & flutes

=== Former members ===
- Harald – guitars
- Igreny – guitars, balalaika
- Zus Obmorokh – guitars
- Karry – guitars
- Vigdis – keyboards
- Vechernica (Lilith) – keyboards
- Al'virius – keyboards, balalaika, back vocal

== Discography ==
- Hymns And Dirges (EP 1995)
- Wodureid (EP 1998)
- Krada (demo, 1999)
- Vo Luzeh (demo, 2000)
- Winter Wood (full-length, 2004, Wroth Emitter)
- Sredokresie (full-length, 2005, Wroth Emitter)
- Live Balkan Path (live album, 2006, Wroth Emitter)
- Kochevonov Plyas (EP, 2008, Wroth Emitter)
- Vedai (full-length, 2010, 2S Prod; limited edition for Russia only)
- Vedai - Sacred knowledge of the Bearland (full-length, 2011, Ygghdrassil Production)
- Skomrah (single, 2013, independent)
