= Metsatöll =

Estonian musical group

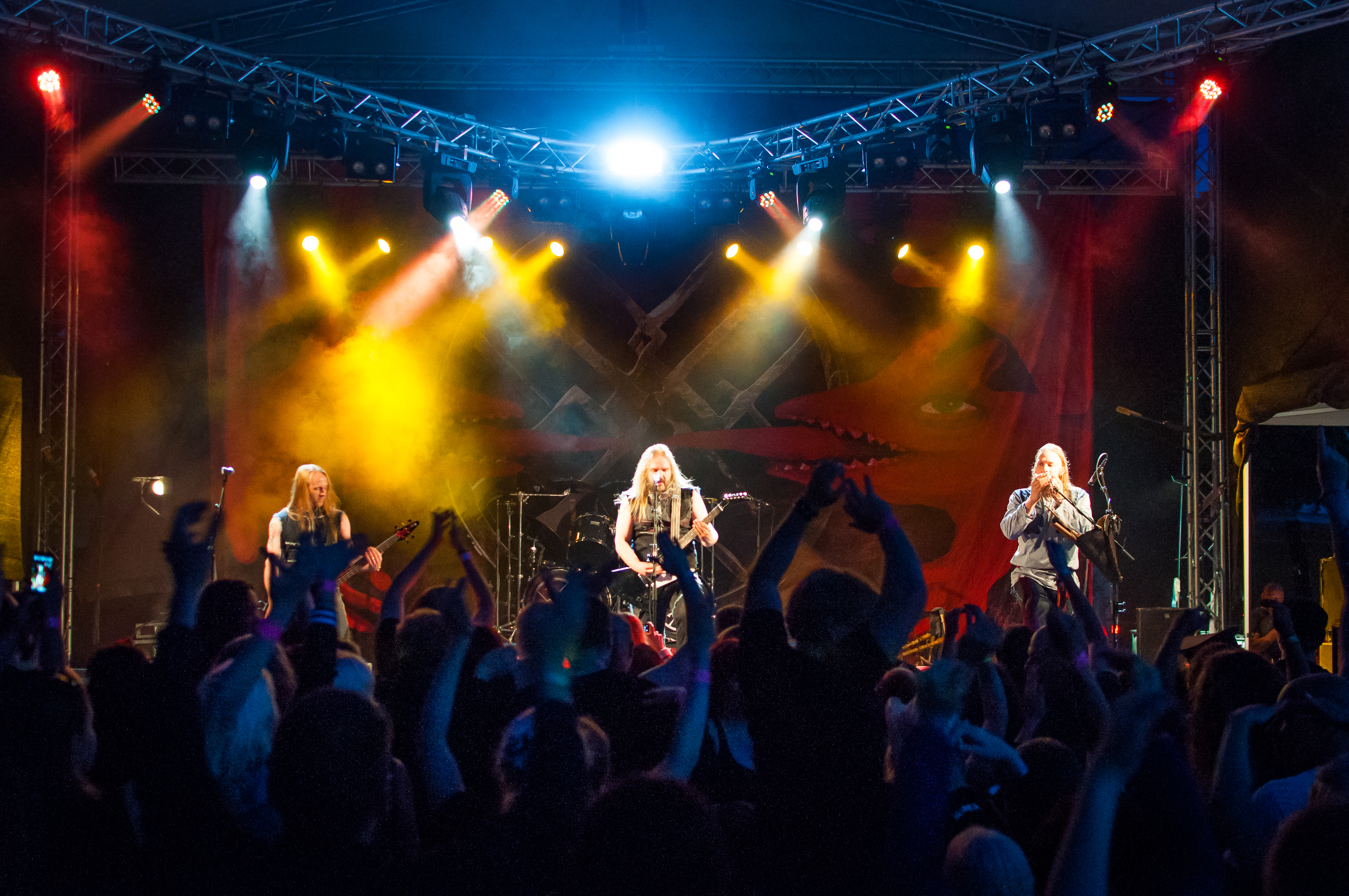
- Metsatöll in Lappeenranta, Finland in 2014.

Background information
- Origin: Tallinn, Estonia
- Genres: Folk metal, thrash metal
- Years active: 1999–present
- Label: Universal Records
- Members: Markus "Rabapagan" Teeäär; Lauri "Varulven" Õunapuu; Raivo "KuriRaivo" Piirsalu; Tõnis Noevere
- Past members: Silver "Factor" Rattasepp; Andrus Tins; Marko Atso
- Website: www.metsatoll.ee

Metsatöll (from mets – 'forest' and töll – 'four-legged being', used in Western Estonia as a euphemism for "wolf" or "werewolf") is an Estonian heavy metal band formed in 1999. The band has been influenced by multiple musical groups along with folk units Garmarna, Stille Volk and Estonian folk/classical music composer Veljo Tormis. Much of their material, featuring flutes and other traditional Estonian instruments, is based on the wars for independence of the 13th and 14th centuries.

== History ==
Metsatöll started playing together on 24 February 1999 as a three-piece (Markus – vocals and guitar, Factor – drums, Andrus – bass), playing epic heavy metal with small influences from ancient Estonian folklore. The debut album called "Terast mis hangund me hinge" ("Steel frozen in our souls") was released at that time.

In the end of 1999, a good friend Varulven joined the band. So far he had observed the activities of the band and had from time to time joined them on stage. Varulven had self-taught himself a number of ancient Estonian folk instruments and together it was realized that metal and old Estonian folk fit together perfectly. Since then, the music of Metsatöll has intertwined more and more with old Estonian runo-singing and traditional melodies.

2001 was a difficult year for the band, since their bass player Andrus left the band, deciding to attend more to his personal affairs, and considering the band too much of a burden. A new bass player, KuriRaivo, was found after a couple of months.

In 2002 Metsatöll released the single "Hundi loomine" ('The Creation of the Wolf'), for which a video was also shot (directed by Liina Paakspuu). Hundi loomine received a number of positive reviews and commentaries in the local media, there was talk of the true mind of the Estonians, the destruction of the negative effects of the English language and the rebirth of folklore through contemporary means and people.

In the beginning of 2004 drummer Factor dedicated himself completely to science and he was replaced by Atso.

In late 2004, Metsatöll released their second album, called Hiiekoda (My Home, My Sacred Grove), which was critically acclaimed by both metal and non-metal fans from all over Estonia. It is a heavy metal album strongly combined with old Estonian traditional instruments.

In 2005, Metsatöll released a remake of their old album Terast mis hangund me hinge called Terast mis hangunud me hinge 10218. The number stands for the world's age according to Estonian chronology. It is much more influenced by folk music and done in a much more professional way in general. They have also released a live album called Lahinguväljal näeme, raisk! (See you on the battlefield, sod/bastard!).

In 2009, Metsatöll signed the Finnish record label Spinefarm Records. A new album, titled Äio was released on 3 March in Estonia and Finland. An Internet single, along with the video to a song from the album, called "Vaid Vaprust" was released on 13 January. The video used fragments of the 1980 animated film Suur Tõll by Jüri Arrak.

In 2011, Metsatöll released another album called Ulg. The first song released was Kivine Maa and a video was made for Küü. The album was nominated for the Estonian Music Awards in the "Metal Album of the Year" category.

In 2012, Metsatöll played on the main stage of the Tuska Open Air Metal Festival in Helsinki. They later released a concert album called Tuska from the same performance.

== Band members ==
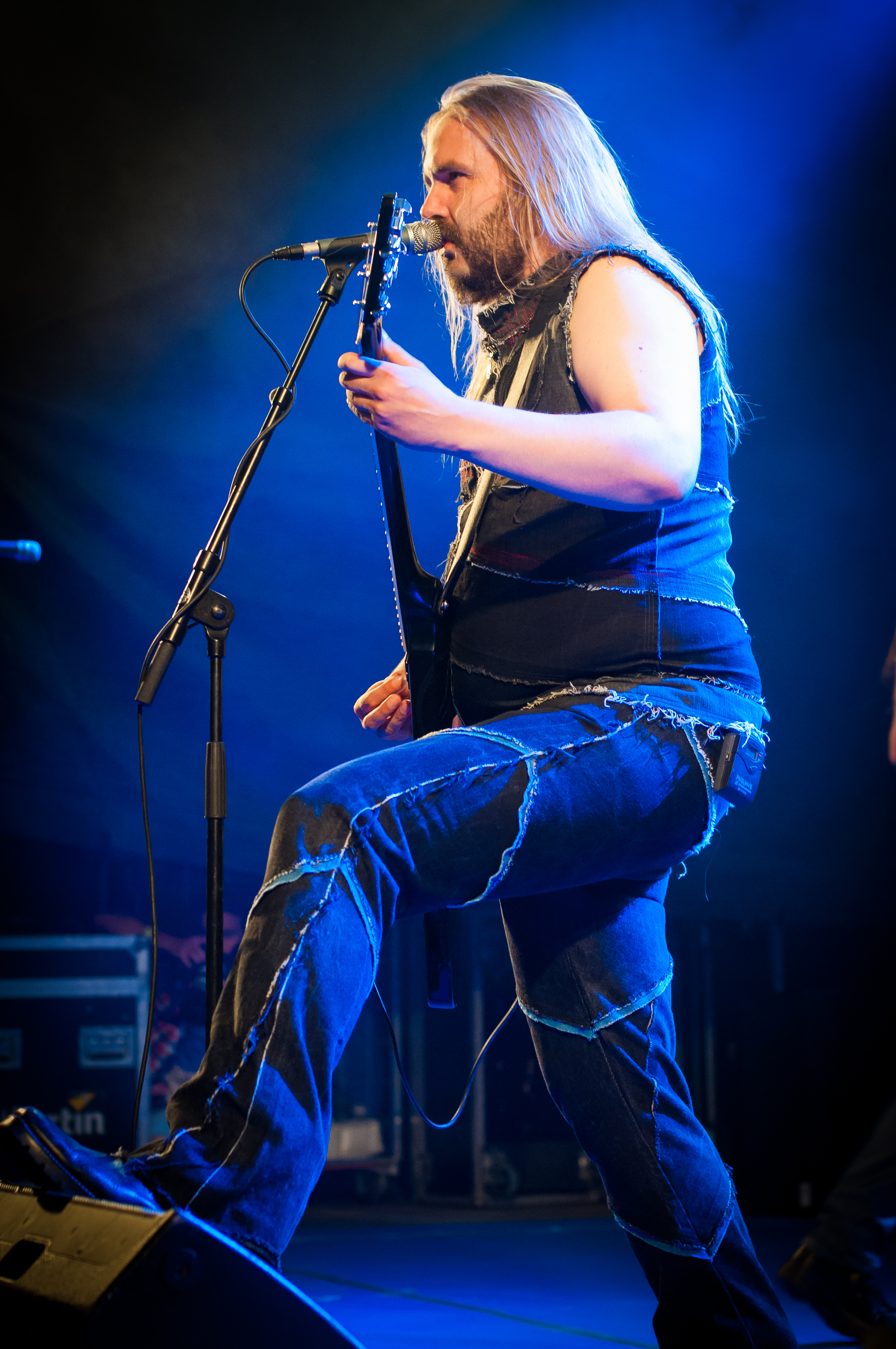
Markus Teeäär performing with Metsatöll in 2014.

Current

- Markus "Rabapagan" Teeäär – lead vocals, rhythm guitar (1999–present)
- Lauri "Varulven" Õunapuu – lead guitar, lead vocals, traditional instruments (1999–present)
- Raivo "KuriRaivo" Piirsalu – bass, backing vocals, contrabass (2000–present)
- Tõnis Noevere – drums, backing vocals (2017–present)

Former

- Silver "Factor" Rattasepp – drums, backing vocals (1999–2004)
- Andrus Tins – bass, backing vocals (1999–2000)
- Marko Atso – drums, backing vocals (2004–2017)

== Discography ==
=== Studio albums ===
- Hiiekoda (2004)
- Terast Mis Hangund Me Hinge 10218 (2005)
- Iivakivi (2008)
- Äio (2010)
- Ulg (2011)
- Karjajuht (2014)
- Katk Kutsariks (2019)

=== Live albums ===
- Raua Needmine (with the Estonian National Male Choir) (2006)
- Tuska (Live at Tuska Open Air Festival) (2012)
- Töri (with the Tallinn Police Orchestra) (2025)

=== Compilation album ===
- Vana Jutuvestja Laulud (2016)

Notes on translation

Metsatöll's titling and lyrics make heavy use of archaic Estonian language and imagery, which often do not have clear English translations. For example, a Hiiekoda is a type of (usually wooden) sacral building constructed near or in a forest considered holy in the pre-Christianisation customs of Estonians. While the word Sutekskäija does mean werewolf, the Estonian werewolf legends are considerably different from those known in Anglophone countries, and this particular word has an emphasis on the human aspect of the person involved, so a better (although not as catchy) translation might be One who regularly engages in werewolf business.

The name Raua needmine is a reference to a work of the same name by Veljo Tormis. The latter's name is sometimes translated as Curse Upon Iron in English.
