= Ymyrgar =

Pagan metal band in Tunisia

Ymyrgar is a pagan/folk metal band from Tunisia, founded in 2012 as the first folk metal band in Africa. Their name is inspired by the primordial giant Ymir who is the ancestor of all Jötnar according to the poetic and prose Edda.

== Foundation ==
Founded in 2012, Ymyrgar is the original idea of the band's Tin whistler Rami Khezami. The band started off as a group of friends enjoying a musical activity together while they were still in high school. In 2014, the band released its debut full-length album “The Tale as far” and in 2015 they performed in Tunisia and Germany. The band is independent and did not sign with any Record label.

== Characteristics ==
The band mixes several music genres like Nordic folk and Metal music. They incorporate the tin whistle and fiddle while creating their music along with more regular instruments like guitars and drums. The band is largely influenced by Norse Mythology, their songs revolve around Ragnarök, Cosmology and the war between the Æsir and Vanir.

== Members ==
The band is composed of seven members:

- Rami Khezami (Tin/Low Whistle) founder
- Belhassen Dahmen (Fiddle)
- Habib Rekik (Lead Vocal)
- Hakim Fezzani (Guitar)
- Mohamed Sléma (Guitar)
- Ahmed Zaier (Bass)
- Nader Ben Hadj Salem (Drums)

== Discography ==
Ymyrgar recorded a demo in 2013 but their first full-length album “The Tale as far” was produced by the band itself in 2014 and it included 7 songs:

1. Einu sinni var
2. Dawn of Time
3. Ode to Mighty Deeds
4. Hall of the Slain
5. The Last Sip
6. Under the Sign of the Path
7. Echoes of a Fallen Era

== Shows ==
Ymyrgar planned a tour in Europe with Asgaardian events for August 2017. The band toured Germany, Poland, Switzerland, Austria, Slovakia, Hungary and the Czech Republic with Bucovina and Lagerstein.
