= Varang Nord =

Heavy metal band from Latvia

- Origin: Daugavpils, Latvia
- Genres: Folk metal Viking metal
- Years active: 2014–present
- Labels: Svietņeica; Sliptrick Records; Metal Scrap Records
- Members: Jeļena Kaļniša; Maksims Popovs; Ņikita Kobcevs; Vjačeslavs Janens; Aigars Zeiza; Valērijs Solovjovs
- Past members: Artjoms Kuricins; Jaroslavs Sokolovs; Edvīns Lazarevičs; Daņila Lopuha; Rinalds Stivriņš; Edgars Jurkjans

Varang Nord is a heavy metal band from Latvia formed in 2014. The band cites Turisas, Amon Amarth and Finntroll as their biggest influences.

== History ==
In 2019, Varang Nord won the Wacken Metal Battle competition.

Their fourth studio album Pārķiuņa uomurs ("Hammer of Pērkons") was released on 23 February 2021, and is fully sung in Latgalian. The album's orchestral arrangements were done by composer Yuri Borin, while Sergey Karshev wrote the bass parts and Alyona Fomina plays the bagpipes and talharpa.

In the end of 2020, Varang Nord announced a 2021 Heathen Heroes Tour in September with concerts in Czech Republic, Poland, Lithuania, Latvia, Estonia and Finland, featuring Týr, Arkona, Dalriada and Varmia.

In 2021 their album "Pārķiuņa Uomurs" was nominated as 'Global Metal Release Of The Year', it finished joint 7th with the album "A Legacy Of Vengeance" by the Falkland Islands death metal band Bloodrust. The band themselves were nominated 'Breakthrough European Band' and finished 10th.

In September 2023, embarked on the Black Pilgrimage Tour with Batushka, Arkona, and Aeternam in which they played 17 concerts in 13 European countries. The tour commenced on September 29 in Romania and concluded on October 15 in Helsinki.

In October 2023, we released an Veļi EP featuring 7 acoustic interpretations of previously released hits.

=== (2024) The accordionist incident and "10 Years of Battles" tour ===
In April 2024, Varang Nord released the single "Latgola" as tribute to the band's native Latgale region.

On June 1, 2024, the band's accordionist, Jeļena Kaļniša, was involved in a serious traffic accident in Daugavpils. She sustained severe injuries, was placed in a medically induced coma, and later transferred to Riga, where she underwent facial surgery. By mid-July, Jeļena reported positive progress in her recovery and expressed gratitude to the medical team and fans for their support.

In support of Jeļena, the band released the single "Nuoves Guņs", featuring a vocal track that, according to the band, she had recorded just days before the accident. The song became a symbol of her return — a new fire igniting within the band, marking a rebirth of strength and spirit.

Jeļena made her return to the stage with Varang Nord on July 20, during a performance in Pāvilosta, where the band introduced several new tracks and prepared for their journey to Germany.

On July 30, 2024, Varang Nord performed at the Wacken Open Air festival in Germany on the LGH Clubstage, as part of the 20th anniversary celebration of the Metal Battle. This performance also marked the beginning of the band's 10-year anniversary program.

The band officially announced their autumn tour, "10 Years of Battles" with planned shows in Latvia, Lithuania, Estonia, Czecch Republic and Poland. The shows in Poland were later canceled due to illness of band members.

== Members ==
Current members

- Jeļena Kaļniša — accordion, vocals (2014–present)
- Maksims Popovs — solo guitar, vocals (2014–present)
- Vjačeslavs Janens — percussions, drums (2017–2023, 2024–present)
- Ņikita Kobcevs — percussions (2023–present)
- Aigars Zeiza — drums (2015–present)
- Valērijs Solovjovs — rhythm guitar (2024–present)

Former members

- Artjoms Kuricins — bass guitar (2014–2016)
- Jaroslavs Sokolovs — electric guitar (2014–2017)
- Daņila Lopuha — bass guitar (2017–2023)
- Edgars Jurkjans — bass guitar (2023–2024)
- Rinalds Stivriņš — rhythm guitar (2022–2023)

== Discography ==
- Fire of the North (2014; EP)
- Master of the Forest (2015)
- Call of Battle (2016; EP)
- Call of Battle (2017)
- Pārķiuņa uomurs (2021)
- Veļi EP (2023)
