= Folkearth =

Multinational folk metal band

- Origin: International
- Genres: Folk metal, Viking metal
- Years active: 2003–present
- Label: Stygian Crypt
- Website: Folkearth on Facebook

Folkearth was an international metal music project created in 2003 by musicians playing folk and Viking metal. The name (folk + earth) symbolizes musicians from all over the world playing folk music. The project was led by Metfolvik of Lithuania. A total of twelve full-length albums have been released, with the most recent being Balder's Lament.

== History ==
The group began in February 2003, when the idea of creating a project which could unite musicians from different countries who play folk and pagan metal originated from some musicians. Their debut album, A Nordic Poem, was released in 2004. Because of what the band perceived as the poor quality of this record, Folkearth later decided to remaster and reissue the album. On 1 August, 2006, shortly after the reissue of A Nordic Poem, the second album, titled By the Sword of My Father, was released. Many bands, such as Van Langen, Thiasos Dionysos, Hildr Valkyrie, Death Army, and The Soil Bleeds Black joined Folkearth in the production of this album: the total line-up consisted of 31 musicians from 8 different countries. Drakkars in the Mist was released on 28 May, 2007, and included the biggest lineup to date. More than 30 musicians worked on the fourth album. However, a token performance on a single track led to a musician being listed on the booklet as a full-fledged member. The band members also do not make money out of the project, and do not promote it, probably because of the lack of funds.

In 2007, Ruslan Danisevskis founded an offshoot project, Folkodia, joined by musicians playing folk and Viking metal.

On June 18, 2008, the band released their fifth album Songs of Yore. It is Folkearth's first acoustic album. Instruments used included acoustic guitars, cellos, Celtic harps, violins, accordions, whistles, flutes, bodhrans, mandolins, banjos, clarinets, Galician bagpipes, soprano recorders, and recorders.

Because of the musical project's complex structure, Folkearth has not performed live, and it is unlikely they would perform live in the future.

On 30 June, 2013, Ruslanas Danisevskis (Metfolvik), the founder and leader of the band, passed away after battling melanoma. The twelfth and last album was produced in honor of him.

== Musical style ==
Folkearth was self-described as a musical forum representing several established folk and metal musicians joined together from all parts of the world.

Because of the structure of Folkearth, the recording process is also different from that of most bands. Each song begins with an individual or band which volunteered to collaborate with Folkearth, and later other members add their touch to it. Sometimes the work on a single song is based on a single riff or melody; other times, an artist writes a song entirely on their own and other musicians simply orchestrate minor details on it. The band members also do not work all together, but rather in small groups, exchanging material they record with others. The music Folkearth makes is regular folk and Viking metal, which incorporates a diverse selection of folk instruments, such as the lute, nyckelharpa, shawm, saz and many others. The extent to which traditional instruments and elements are used varies greatly between songs.

=== Lyrics ===
The lyrics are all written in English, with the exception of "Gryningssång". The main topic of Folkearth's lyrics is ancient history, beliefs, and mythology, especially Norse mythology. Celtic mythology and Greek mythology are also present in Folkearth's lyrics. Folkearth's songs tell stories and their purpose is to entertain, not to carry a symbolic or personal message.

== Band members ==
=== Current members ===
Greece

- Marios "Prince Imrahil" Koutsoukos (Dol Amroth, Folkodia)
- Hildr Valkyrie (Hildr Valkyrie, Folkodia)

Argentina

- Juan Churruarin (Juskko/Zrymgöll, Folkodia)

Monaco

- Saga (Black Knight Symfonia, Folkodia)
- Anaïs Chevallier (Black Knight Symfonia, Folkodia)

Germany

- Nostarion (Dämmerfarben, Dystertid, Throndt, Funeral Procession, Falkenbach, Folkodia)
- Dennis Schwachhofer (Vroudenspil, Folkodia)

United States

- Kyle Freese (Anno Domine)

Italy

- Gianluca Tamburini (Folkodia)

France

- Emily Cooper

Russia

- Yanina Zelenskaya

=== Former members ===
Lithuania

- Metfolvik (Ravenclaw)

Greece

- Polydeykis (Sacred Blood, Athlos, Zion)
- Faethon
- Stefanos Koutsoukos (Dol Amroth)
- Nikos Nezeritis (Dol Amroth)
- Thanasis Karapanos (Winters Dawn)

Austria

- Alex "Hugin" Wieser (Uruk-Hai, Hrossharsgrani)

United Kingdom

- Athelstan (Forefather)
- Wulfstan (Forefather)
- Owain ap Arawn (Annwn)

Switzerland

- Chrigel Glanzmann (Eluveitie)

Sweden

- Magnus Wohlfart (Yggdrasil, Nae'blis)
- William Ekeberg (Broken Dagger)
- Simon Frodeberg
- Jeremy Child (Yggdrasil)
- Jonas Fröberg (Trymheim)
- Kristofer Janiec
- Michelle Maas
- Niklas Olausson (Broken Dagger)
- Daniel Fredriksson (Otyg)
- Daniel Pettersson (Pettersson & Fredriksson)

Germany

- Tobias Andrelang
- Achim Eberle
- Ralf Gruber
- Bernd Intveen (Van Langen)
- Sabine Stelzer (Van Langen)
- Marcus Van Langen (Van Langen)
- André Groschopp (Thiasos Dionysos)
- Morten Basse (Thulr)

United States

- Dreogan (Peordh)
- Shea Martinsson (Mag Mell)
- Billy Knockenhauer (Folkodia)
- Mark Riddick (The Soil Bleeds Black)

Italy

- Becky (Furor Gallico)
- Alessandro Caruso (Hysterya)
- Francesca Crotti
- Igor Saviola
- Fabio Drovandi (Furor Gallico)
- Axel (Death Army)
- Raven
- Ulven (Draugen)

Belgium

- Roman Samonin (Morituri)
- Ralf Goossens (Morituri)

Croatia

- Vojan Koceic (Koziak)
- Filip Vučković

Poland

- Shav (USOP)
- Yode (USOP)
- Raju (USOP)

Norway

- Haavard Tveito (Vetter)

Russia

- Orey (Pagan Reign)
- Vetrodar (Pagan Reign)

Spain

- Autumn (Hordak)
- Winter (Hordak)
- Antonio Mansilla (Last Deception)
- Jesus Sierra (Last Deception)
- Jose Luis Frias
- A. Pangin
- GG Karman

Australia

- Matthew Bell (Troldhaugen, Seventh Sword, Folkodia, Menelvagor, KnightQueste)
- Sean "Forneus" Falconer (Forneus, KnightQueste, Troldhaugen, Folkodia)
- Simon Batley (KnightQueste, Troldhaugen, Seventh Sword, Folkodia)

== Discography ==
- A Nordic Poem (2004)
- By the Sword of My Father (2006)
- Drakkars in the Mist (2007)
- Father of Victory (2008)
- Songs of Yore (2008)
- Fatherland (2008)
- Rulers of the Sea (2009)
- Viking's Anthem (2010)
- Sons of the North (2011)
- Minstrels by the River (2011)
- Valhalla Ascendant (2012)
- Balder's Lament (2014)
