= Thanateros (band) =

German medieval metal band

- Origin: Berlin, Germany
- Genre: folk metal
- Years active: 1999–2010; 2019–present
- Label: Echozone
- Members: Ben Richter; Christian Lang; Christof Uhlmann; MarT Møller
- Past members: Jens Busch; Mario Ulrich; Jens Riediger; Christoph Maaß; Pascal Wojtkow; Karsten Kennert; Oliver Bienert; Cornel Otto; Max Raith; Tobias Herzfeld; Pit Vinandy; Simon Rippin; Daniel Lechner; Marcus Hotz; Markus Felber; Chrys Ryll
- Website: thanateros.net

Thanateros is a German folk metal band founded in 1999 with Irish-Celtic influences. The name Thanateros is a combination of the names of the Greek gods of death (Thanatos) and love/sexuality (Eros). Though it refers to the chaos-magical order of the “Illuminates of Thanateros” (IOT), Thanateros is not bound to the IOT but an independent and separate band. Nevertheless, sometimes Thanateros draws on magical and pagan motives including Celtic mythology and shamanism.

== History ==
=== 2000–2010 ===
Thanateros was founded in 1999 as a solo project by Ben Richter after he left the dark metal band Evereve. In 2000, he put together his first line-up. Their debut album, The First Rite, was released in 2001, followed by a support tour with In Extremo. In 2002, the band played individual concerts and festival appearances.

In 2003, the second album Circle of Life was released, produced by guitarist Jens Busch, with traditional instruments emphasizing the Irish-Celtic folk aspect more strongly. The release of Circle of Life was accompanied by the band's first headlining club tour through Germany and Austria. Festival appearances followed in the summer and fall of that year, including with bands such as Subway to Sally, Letzte Instanz, Tanzwut, L'Âme Immortelle, and Schandmaul.

In 2005, Into the Otherworld, the third Thanateros album, also produced by Jens Busch, was released. It included the first single release, the classic Dirty Old Town, made famous by The Pogues, whose video clip was produced by Dietrich Brüggemann (Oomph!, Rammstein). This was followed by tours with Umbra et Imago and Fields of the Nephilim's successor band NFD, as well as various headlining concerts and festival appearances (including with Saltatio Mortis, Subway to Sally, ASP, and Clan of Xymox).

In 2008, the band produced its fourth album, Liber Lux, with a new lineup, which was released on April 3, 2009. Further festival appearances followed, including with Fiddler's Green (band), Tristania, Pothead, and Finntroll. Despite their success, Ben Richter disbanded the band in early 2010.

=== From 2019 ===
After Ben Richter released two albums (Raum/Zeit and Weltenbrand) with the German metal band Phosphor, which he founded in 2015, he decided to revive Thanateros in 2018. Together with Phosphor guitarist Chris Lang, he created a new line-up in early 2019. The album Insomnia was released in September 2019.

In mid-2020, the group signed a contract with Echozone, and in November of that year, Insomnia was released as a special edition. In addition to the complete album, Insomnia S.E. includes selected songs as purely instrumental versions. In September 2021, the album On Fragile Wings was recorded together with producer Simon Rippin. On February 11, 2022, the first single, Coven of the Drowned, was released, followed by the second single, Fading, on March 11, and the album on March 24. Festival appearances followed in the summer.

In December 2023, the band began recording another album, once again with Simon Rippin as producer and this time also as drummer. In January 2024, guitars, violins, vocals, and other audio tracks were recorded. In the meantime, bassist Chrys Ryll had to leave the band for personal reasons and was replaced by MarT Møller.

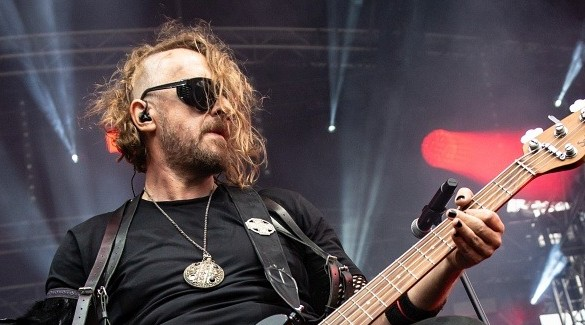
MarT Møller performing with THANATEROS at Castle Party Festival 2025, Bolków, Poland

Three advance tracks were released: I Am All, The Horned One, a tribute to the Horned God, and I Hold You. The album Tranceforming was released on October 11, 2024 and was presented at festivals with Lacrimas Profundere, Eden weint im Grab , and Megaherz, among others.

=== Albums ===
- 2001: The First Rite (CD, Andromeda / Vielklang Musikproduktion)
- 2003: Circle of Life (CD, Andromeda / Vielklang Musikproduktion)
- 2005: Into the Otherworld (CD, Rabazco Records)
- 2009: Liber Lux (CD, New Crusade Records)
- 2019: Insomnia (CD, Calygram Records / Calyra)
- 2022: On Fragile Wings (CD, Echozone)
- 2024: Tranceforming (CD, Echozone)

=== Singles ===
- 2005: Dirty Old Town (CD/7”-Vinyl, Rabazco Records)
- 2023: Burn (Acoustic Version) (CD, Echozone)
- 2024: We Are The Ravens (Radio Edit) (CD, Echozone)
- 2024: I Am All (CD, Echozone)
- 2024: The Horned One (CD, Echozone)
- 2024: I Hold You (CD, Echozone)

=== Music videos ===
- So High (2003, directed by Blackstage Video Postproduction)
- Calling Llyr (2004, directed by Blackstage Video Postproduction)
- Dirty Old Town (2005, directed by Dietrich Brügmann)
- The Lost King (2019, directed by David Hennen)
- Cthulhu Rising (2020, directed by Markus Felber and Ben Richter)
- Fading (2022, directed by Ben Richter)
- Coven of the Drowned (2022, directed by Hannes Mühlenbruch)
- We Are The Ravens (2024, directed by Ben Richter)
- I Am All (2024, directed by BOB-MEDIA)
- The Horned One (2024, directed by Chris M.)
- I Hold You (2024, directed by Hannes Mühlenbruch)
