= Folk metal =

Music fusion genre

- Stylistic origins: Heavy metal; folk; world
- Cultural origins: Early 1990s, Europe
- Derivative forms: Viking metal; Pagan metal; Pirate metal; Oriental metal

Subgenres
- Celtic metal; medieval metal

Other topics
- Folk punk; Latin metal; list of folk metal bands

Folk metal is a fusion genre of heavy metal music and traditional folk music that developed in Europe during the 1990s. It is characterised by the widespread use of folk instruments and, to a lesser extent, traditional singing styles (for example, Dutch Heidevolk, Danish Sylvatica and Spanish Stone of Erech). It also sometimes features soft instrumentation influenced by folk rock.

The earliest folk metal bands were Skyclad from England and Cruachan from Ireland. Skyclad's debut album The Wayward Sons of Mother Earth was released in 1991 and would be considered a thrash metal album with some folk influences, unlike Cruachan’s early work which embraced the folk element as a defining part of their sound. It was not until 1994 and 1995 that other early contributors in the genre began to emerge from different regions of Europe and beyond. Among these early groups, the German band Subway to Sally spearheaded a different regional variation that over time became known as medieval metal. Despite their contributions, folk metal remained little known with few representatives during the 1990s. It was not until the early 2000s when the genre exploded into prominence, particularly in Finland with the efforts of such groups as Finntroll, Ensiferum, Korpiklaani, Turisas, and Moonsorrow.

The music of folk metal is characterised by its diversity with bands known to perform different styles of both heavy metal music and folk music. A large variety of folk instruments are used in the genre with many bands consequently featuring six or more members in their regular line-ups. A few bands are also known to rely on keyboards to simulate the sound of folk instruments. Lyrics in the genre commonly deal with fantasy, mythology, paganism, history and nature.

== History ==
=== Origins ===
It was always my heartfelt dream to see the energy of Metal music mixed with elements from more traditional styles.

— Martin Walkyier, former vocalist for Skyclad

Skyclad's "The Widdershins Jig" (1991)
This 21 second sample from Skyclad's debut album The Wayward Sons of Mother Earth is an early instance of folk metal.

The English band Skyclad was formed in 1990 after vocalist Martin Walkyier left his previous band, the thrash metal group Sabbat. Skyclad began as a thrash metal band but added violins from session musician Mike Evans on several tracks from their debut album, The Wayward Sons of Mother Earth, an effort described by Eduardo Rivadavia of AllMusic as "ambitious" and "groundbreaking." The song "The Widdershins Jig" from the debut album has been acclaimed as "particularly significant" and "a certain first in the realms of Metal". With a full-time fiddler in their lineup, the band's second album featured a "now legendary folky jig style" and "more prominent inclusion of the fiddle playing lead lines and melodies normally associated with the lead guitar parts of most other rock bands."

Even with the departure of Martin Walkyier in 2001, Skyclad remains an active folk metal group today after nearly two decades since their formation. In contrast, the Portuguese band Moonspell had a brief tenure in the genre. Their first release was the 1994 Under the Moonspell EP with music that featured Lusitanian folk and Medieval influences. With the release of their debut album Wolfheart in the following year, the band made a transition into gothic metal and within a matter of years "quickly evolved into one of the major players of the European goth-metal scene."

Cruachan were formed in 1992 in Dublin, Ireland. From the outset their intention was to mix the native Irish folk music of their home country with the more extreme side of metal music. Their debut album Tuatha Na Gael was released in 1995 and was a full folk metal album from start to finish. In the Italian book Folk Metal, Dalle origini al Ragnarök, a comprehensive history of the genre, author Fabrizio Giosuè credits Cruachan as being the very first real folk metal band. He acknowledges that Skyclad did have some folk parts in some songs before Cruachan however he goes on to say Cruachan used folk music as much as they used heavy metal music. Cruachan also used arrangements of known folk songs and melodies, Skyclad wrote folk "sounding" parts.

Spanish band Mägo de Oz was among early folk metal artists that were influenced by the Celtic folk music. The band introduced folk elements and instruments in their power metal-based music from their 1994 debut album. Another early developer of folk metal is the Finnish group Amorphis. They formed in 1990 with their debut album, The Karelian Isthmus, following two years later. Their sophomore effort Tales from the Thousand Lakes was released in 1994 with "plenty of fascinating melodies and song structures that drew heavily from the traditional folk music of their native country." The album received a favorable reception from fans with "its content quickly being exalted across the metal underground as perhaps the very pinnacle of atmospheric death metal achievement."

=== Regional variations ===
==== Medieval metal ====
Subway to Sally's "Krähenfrass" (1995)
This 18 second sample is an early example of medieval rock from Subway to Sally's second album MCMXCV.

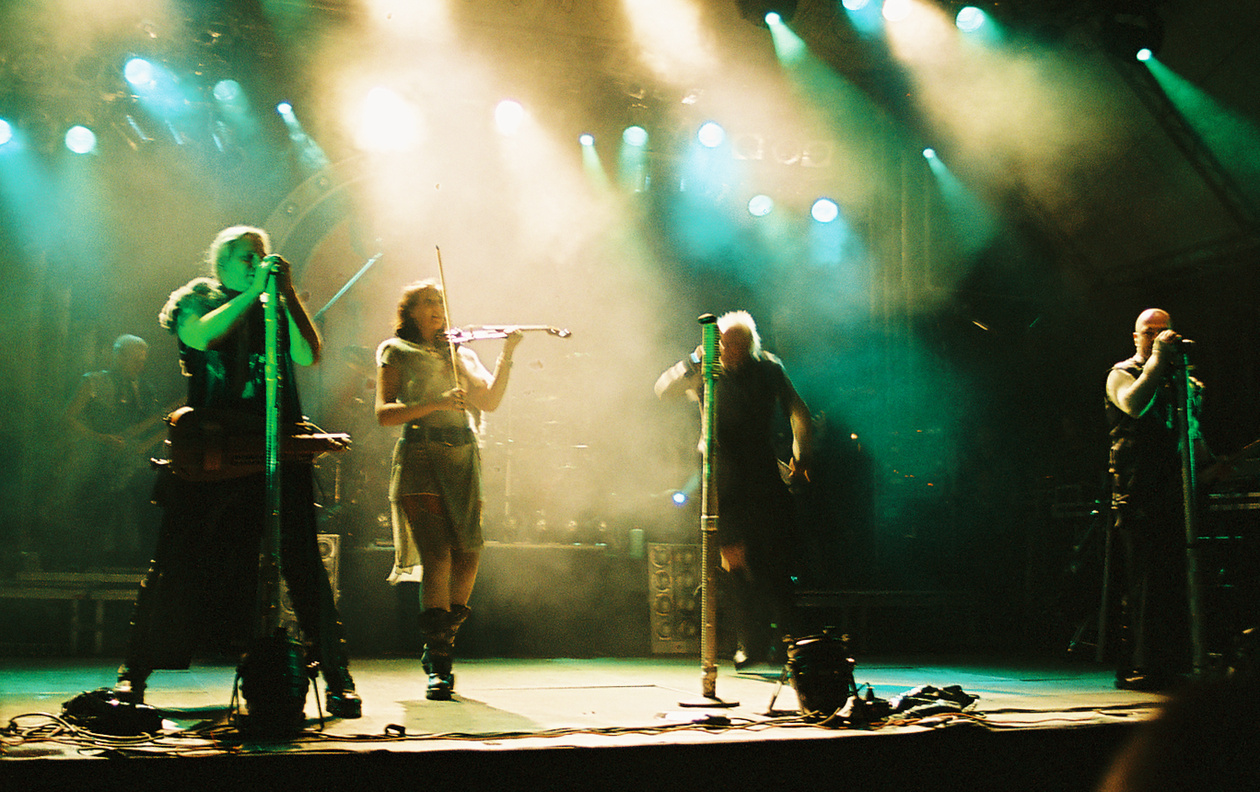
Subway to Sally, seen here performing live at the 2005 Sundstock Openair, has been credited as setting off medieval metal.

The German band Subway to Sally was formed in 1992 as a folk rock band, singing in English and incorporating Irish and Scottish influences in their music. With their second album MCMXCV released in 1995, the band adopted a "more traditional approach" and started singing in German. Taking Skyclad as an influence, Subway to Sally performs a blend of hard rock and heavy metal "enriched with medieval melodies enmeshed in the songs via bagpipes, hurdy-gurdy, lute, mandoline, shalm [sic], fiddle and flute" and combined with "romantic-symbolic German-speaking poetry" in their lyrics. With chart success in their native Germany, they have since been credited as the band "that set off the wave of what is known as medieval rock."

This distinctly German phenomenon has been continued and expanded further by subsequent bands. Formed in 1996, the Berlin based In Extremo has also found chart success with their "medieval style stage garb and unashamed usage of such bizarre, sometimes hand made, instruments as the Scottish bagpipes." Another band that has experienced commercial success in Germany is the Bavarian outfit Schandmaul. Describing themselves as the "minstrels of today," the band employs a musical arsenal that includes the bagpipes, hurdy-gurdy, shawm, violin and mandolin.

==== Celtic metal ====
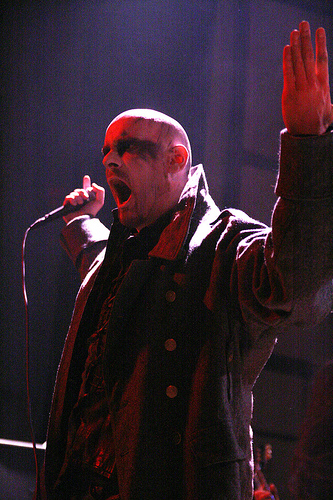
A.A. Nemtheanga fronts the Irish Celtic black metal act Primordial.

The Irish band Cruachan was formed in 1992 by guitarist Keith Fay with their first demo recording distributed in 1993. Drawing inspiration from Skyclad's first album, Fay set out to combine black metal with the folk music of Ireland. Their debut album Tuatha Na Gael was released in 1995 and the band has since been acclaimed as having "gone the greatest lengths of anyone in their attempts to expand" the genre of folk metal. Cruachan's combination of Celtic music and heavy metal is known today as Celtic metal.

Parallel to Cruachan, the black metal act Primordial also released a demo recording in 1993 and "found themselves heralded as frontrunners in the burgeoning second-wave black metal movement." Irish music plays "a very big role" in Primordial but in "a dark and subtle way" through the chords and timings. The band has since "established themselves as one of the most unique sounding bands in the folk-meets-black metal field." Other early representatives of Celtic metal include the bands Geasa, Mägo de Oz and Waylander with both groups releasing a demo recording in 1995.

In later years, the genre expanded beyond Ireland, with bands from continental Europe incorporating Celtic influences into various forms of gothic, folk, and metal music. The German band Thanateros has been described as combining gothic rock and metal with Celtic and medieval folk elements. Their music has been characterized as a mixture of folk, gothic, and metal styles.

==== Oriental metal ====
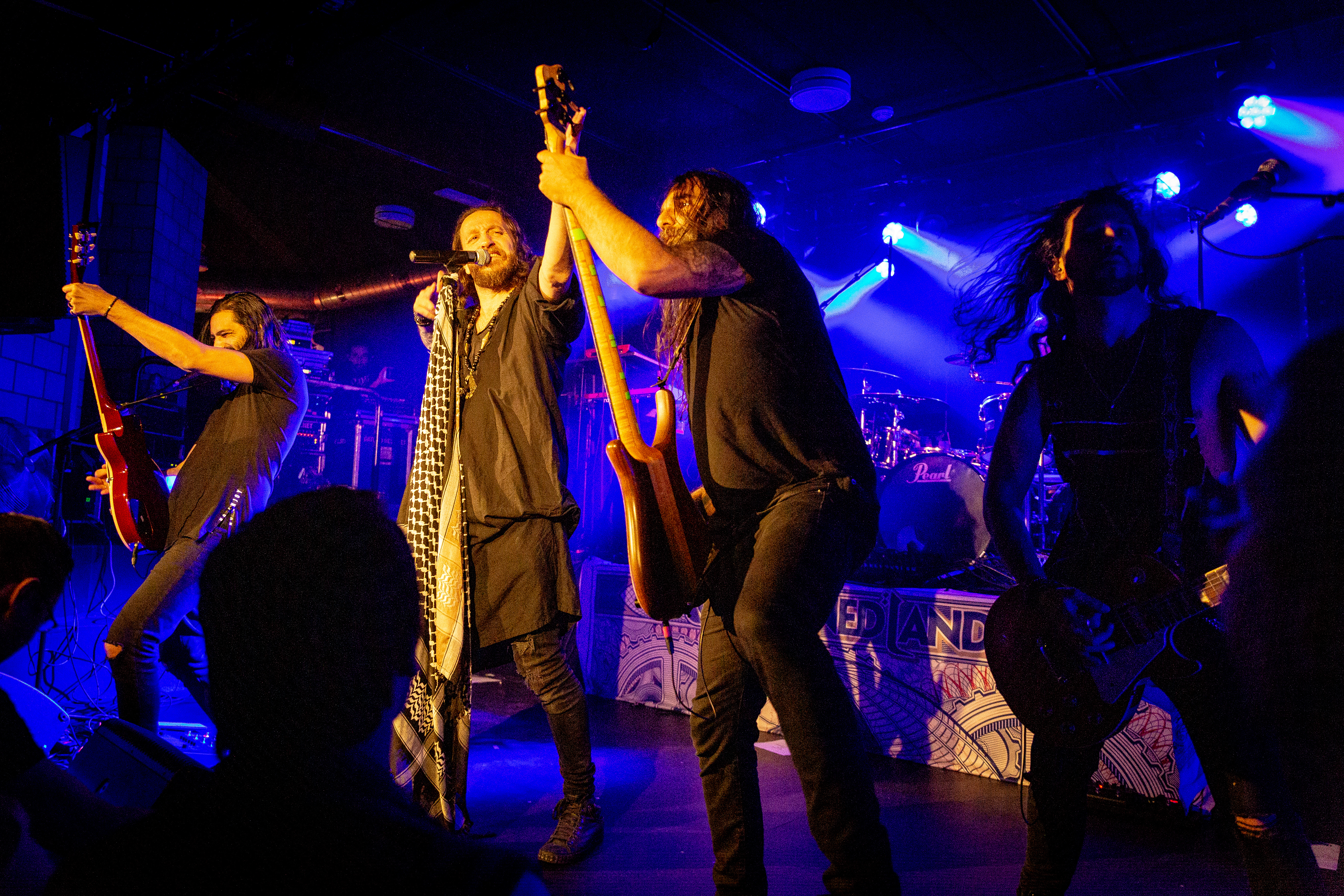
Orphaned Land is a leading performer of oriental metal.

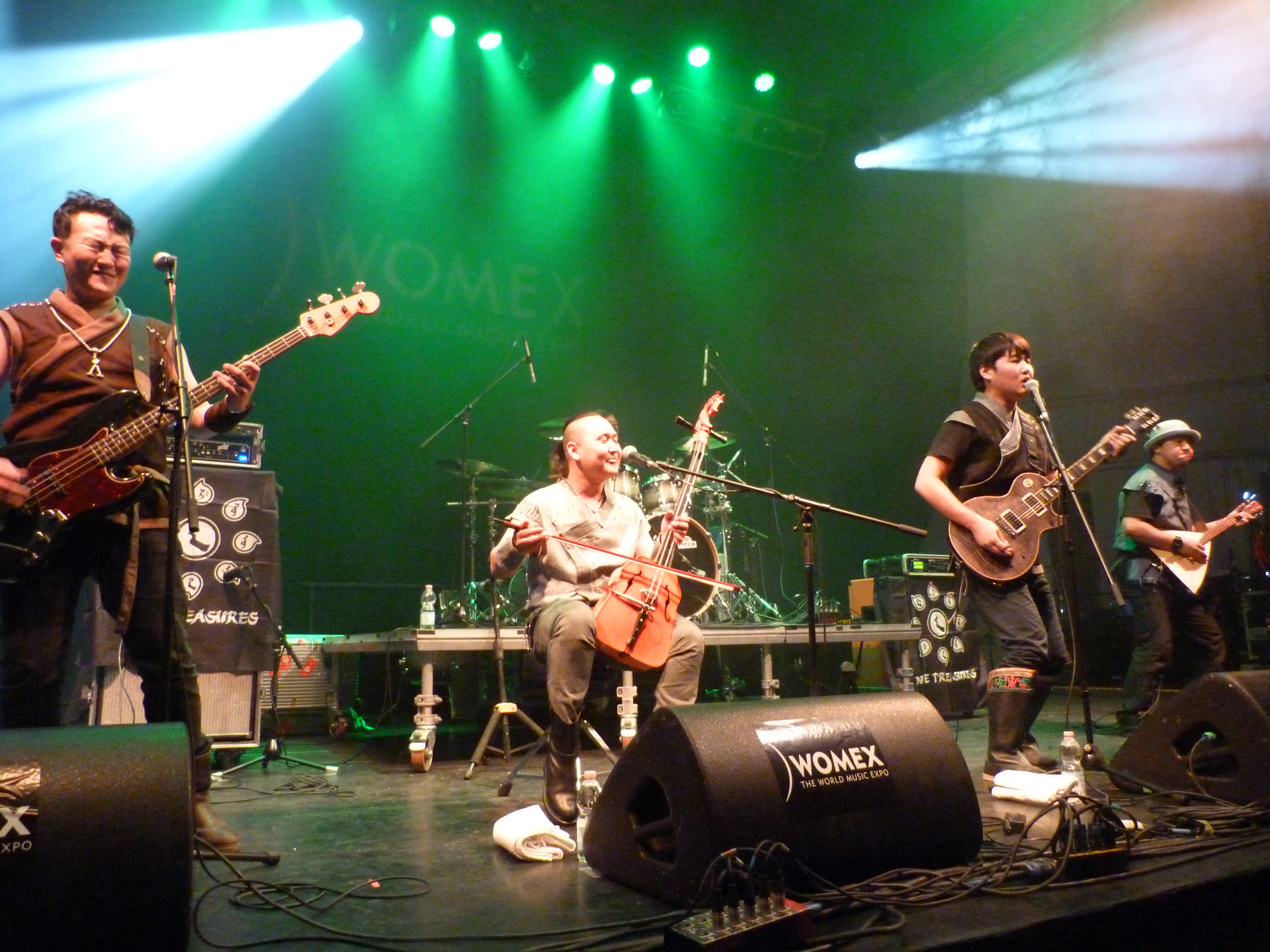
Nine Treasures performing at WOMEX 15, Budapest

The Israeli progressive metal band Orphaned Land was formed in 1991 and released the demo The Beloved's Cry in 1993, "immediately creating a media stir" that "quickly drew attention to their unorthodox style." The music of Orphaned Land "borrow[s] heavily from Middle Eastern music styles" with traditional elements coming from both Jewish and Arabic folk music. Acclaimed as "one of the world's most unique and trailblazing heavy metal bands," Orphaned Land's style of music has since been dubbed oriental metal.

Melechesh formed in Jerusalem in 1995, becoming "undoubtedly the first overtly anti-Christian band to exist in one of the holiest cities in the world." Melechesh began as a straightforward black metal act with their first foray into folk metal occurring on the title track of their 1996 EP The Siege of Lachish. Their subsequent albums saw the group straddling the boundaries between black, death, and thrash metal, with "impressive, tastefully rendered epics chock-full of superb riffs, Middle Eastern melodies, and vocal exchanges varying from a throaty midrange screech to chanting." Other oriental metal acts emerged thereafter with the band Distorted emerging in 1996 as the first female-fronted metal act from Israel.

Additional oriental metal bands emerged form the Middle East in the 2000s, such as Myrath from Tunisia, who mix Middle Eastern and Arabic melodies with power metal and progressive rock. The Kordz from Lebanon combine Middle Eastern instrumentation with politicized lyrics. and Andaz Uzzal from Algeria combine that region's traditional music forms with heavy metal. Egypt's Massive Scar Era includes several female members, who have reported harassment due to their participation in heavy metal music.

=== Development ===
From the middle of the 1990s, other bands gradually emerged to combine heavy metal with folk music. Storm was a short lived Norwegian supergroup with Fenriz, Satyr and Kari Rueslåtten from the black metal groups Darkthrone, Satyricon and the doom metal band The 3rd and the Mortal respectively. Their only album Nordavind was released in 1995 with the use of keyboards to imitate the sound of folk instruments. The Germans Empyrium also relied on synthesizers and guitars to deliver their "dark folklore" black metal music with the release of their 1996 debut album A Wintersunset...

The year 1996 also saw the debut album of the "one-man black metal project of multi-instrumentalist Vratyas Vakyas" from Germany known as Falkenbach. Even though Falkenbach was formed as early as 1989, the band didn't get much attention until the debut, that includes epic music that is "rife with keyboards, Viking themes, and folk music tendencies," Falkenbach was effectively a merge of Viking metal with folk metal. They were joined in the next two years by other bands combining the two genres including Windir, Månegarm and Thyrfing.

Predating most folk metal groups, the Spanish band Mägo de Oz was formed as far back as 1989 with a self-titled debut album, released in 1994. With nine members in their lineup, including a violinist and flutist, the band has evolved over the years into a combination of power metal and Celtic flavored folk metal. They have experienced strong chart success in their native Spain as well as in South America and Mexico.

Slough Feg from Pennsylvania, United States also had an early formation dating back to 1990. Their self-titled debut album was released in 1996 and the band has pursued a "unique style of combining traditional/power metal with folk metal."

The Czech band Silent Stream of Godless Elegy had formed in 1995 as a doom metal band "laced with Pagan imagery and adventurous enough to include violins and cellos alongside the expected modern day arsenal." With the release of their second album Behind the Shadows in 1998, the band began to use "folklore influences" in their music.

=== Explosion ===
During the nineties and even at the end of the nineties, there were very few bands. We had Waylander from Ireland. And one or two in Europe, but it was very rare to get a real folk metal band. Nowadays it is a bit of an explosion all over the place. - Keith Fay of Cruachan in 2006

Finntroll's "Slaget vid Blodsälv" (2001)
The use of humppa rhythms and keyboards are evident in this 20 second sample from Finntroll's second album Jaktens tid.

Korpiklaani's "Wooden Pints" (2003)
This 21 second sample from Korpiklaani's first album Spirit of the Forest features the prominent use of violins.

Balkandji's "Diavolska shterka" (2001)
A longer example of folk metal from Balkandji's first album Probuzhdane.

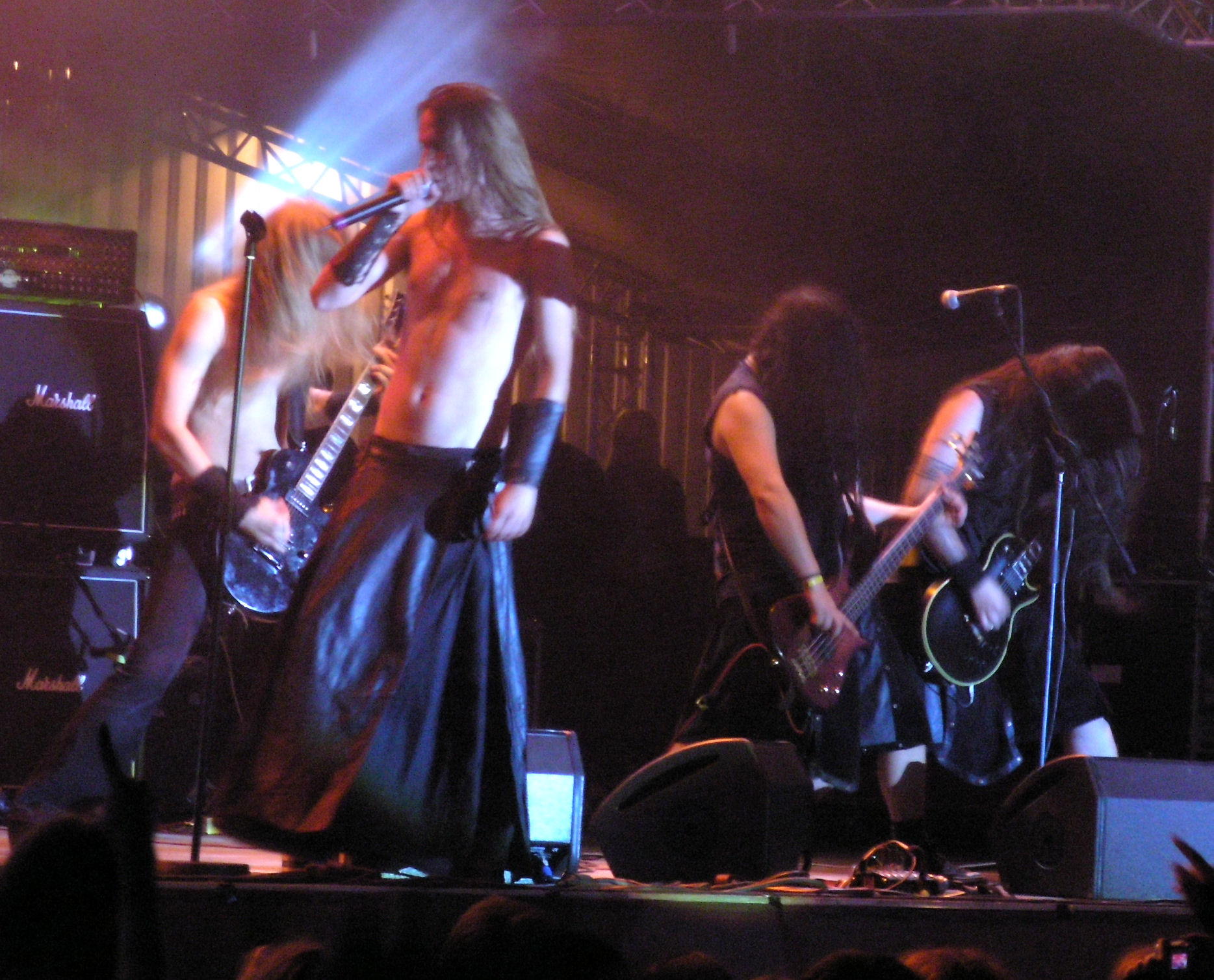
Finntroll is a prominent folk metal band with a specific interest in trolls and humppa.

The folk metal genre has dramatically expanded with the turn of the new millennium. At the forefront of this explosion, with a "revolutionary clash of tradition and amplification that set them apart", is a group from Finland known as Finntroll. The band was formed in 1997 with a demo recorded the following year and a debut album Midnattens widunder released in 1999. They have since developed a reputation for being "obsessed with all things trollish." Their lyrics are sung exclusively in Swedish instead of the Finnish language "apparently because this language was better to evoke the trollish spirit", even though the real reason for this lies in the band's original vocalist belonging to the Swedish-speaking minority. The music of Finntroll features a "real innovation" in the marriage of black metal music with a style of Finnish polka called humppa. Specifically, the band took from humppa "the alternate picking bass lines accompanied with the drumbeat, and the use of accordion." This unlikely mix of polka and extreme metal has received a mixed reception from critics. Andy Hinds of AllMusic laments the polka influence as undermining "the intended threat of a death metal band" while his colleague Alex Henderson praises the band for their "solid, consistently likable effort," declaring that Finntroll has set themselves apart from their peers "because of their emphasis on Finnish humppa" and "the humor and irony they bring to the table."

Finntroll's second album Jaktens tid was released in 2001 and became a chart success in their native Finland. Some of the songs on the album feature vocals performed by Jonne Järvelä of Korpiklaani, another band from Finland. While other folk metal bands began with metal before adding folk music, Korpiklaani started with folk music before turning metal. The roots of Korpiklaani can be traced back to a Sami folk music group under the name of Shamaani Duo, an "in house restaurant band" created in 1993. An album of folk music was released under this name before Jonne Järvelä relocated and formed a new band, Shaman. The folk metal act Shaman was based on the folk music of Shamaani Duo. Two albums were released in 1999 and 2001 before Shaman changed their name to Korpiklaani. The change in name was accompanied by a change in the music. The traditional yoik vocals and the use of the Northern Sámi language were dropped while the synthesizer was replaced with real folk instruments. Jonne Järvelä credits his work with Finntroll as the catalyst for the shift in emphasis from folk to metal.

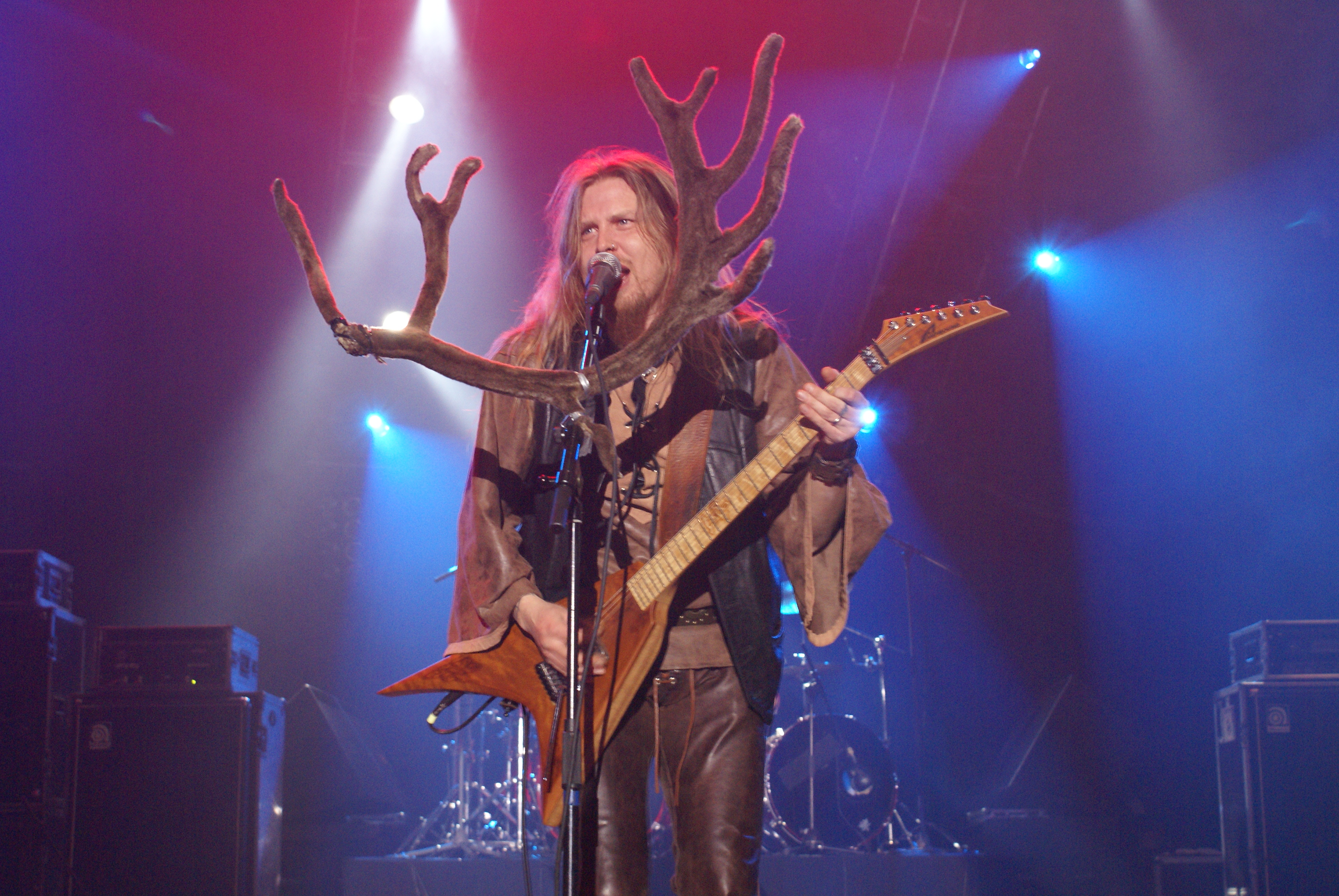
Jonne Järvelä of Korpiklaani played acoustic folk music for five years before turning his attention to folk metal.

While Korpiklaani used an assortment of traditional instruments to deliver their folk metal, Finntroll relies on keyboards for Finnish folk melodies played in the humppa style. The keyboards in Finntroll are performed by Henri Sorvali who also performs in Moonsorrow, another folk metal band from Finland that he formed with his cousin Ville Sorvali in 1995. They released two demos, the first in 1997 and another in 1999, before the 2001 debut album Suden Uni. Moonsorrow blends folk metal with Viking metal by incorporating "Finland's traditional folk music forms into elaborate symphonic arrangements typical of Viking metal outfits such as Bathory and Enslaved." The adoption of folk elements was "becoming all the rage" in Finland by this point and other folk metal bands from Finland that began to emerge in the early 2000s included Cadacross, Ensiferum and later on Turisas and Wintersun. Ensiferum notably found themselves at the top of the Finnish charts with their 2007 single "One More Magic Potion". Finntroll, Korpiklaani, Moonsorrow and Turisas have all experienced chart success in their native Finland as well.

There are also folk metal acts from the other Nordic countries. Icelandic group Skálmöld is a notable example. The Norwegian act Glittertind was A-listed and played with the highest playing frequency on Norway's most popular radio channel NRK P1 with the song "Kvilelaus" (eng. Restless)" and performed the song on Lindmo when they released their first full-length as a full band. Other Norwegian acts include the aforementioned Storm and Windir as well as more recent groups such as Kampfar, Lumsk, Ásmegin and Trollfest. Bands from Sweden include the aforementioned Thyrfing and Månegarm along with other acts such as Otyg and Vintersorg. Folk metal bands from Denmark include Wuthering Heights, Svartsot, Huldre and the Faroe Islanders Týr.

Outside Scandinavia, other European nations have contributed to the growing genre. Groups from the Baltic states of Estonia, Latvia and Lithuania includes Metsatöll, Raud-Ants, Skyforger and Varang Nord while representatives from Russia include Alkonost, Arkona and Butterfly Temple. More isolated examples across Europe include Dimmi Argus and Balkandji from Bulgaria, Equilibrium and Finsterforst from Germany, Dalriada from Hungary, Ithilien from Belgium, Cruadalach from the Czech Republic, Litvintroll from Belarus, Nightcreepers from France, Zaria from Slovenia, Mägo de Oz and Saurom from Spain, Elvenking from Italy and Eluveitie from Switzerland.

Folkearth is an international folk metal project with members from several different European countries. At its inception, the project consisted of 14 musicians from separate backgrounds in folk and metal music. With their second album By the Sword of My Father released in 2006, the project boasted the participation of 31 musicians.

Beyond the European continent, folk metal is relatively rare with only a few known acts including the aforementioned The Lord Weird Slough Feg and their fellow Americans Agalloch. The latter's music "made for a stark geographical anomaly, since its eclectic, avant-garde folk-metal was the sort of thing one would expect to emerge from Scandinavia - not Portland, Oregon." Tuatha de Danann is another geographical anomaly with their Celtic metal from Brazil.

== Characteristics ==
=== Music ===
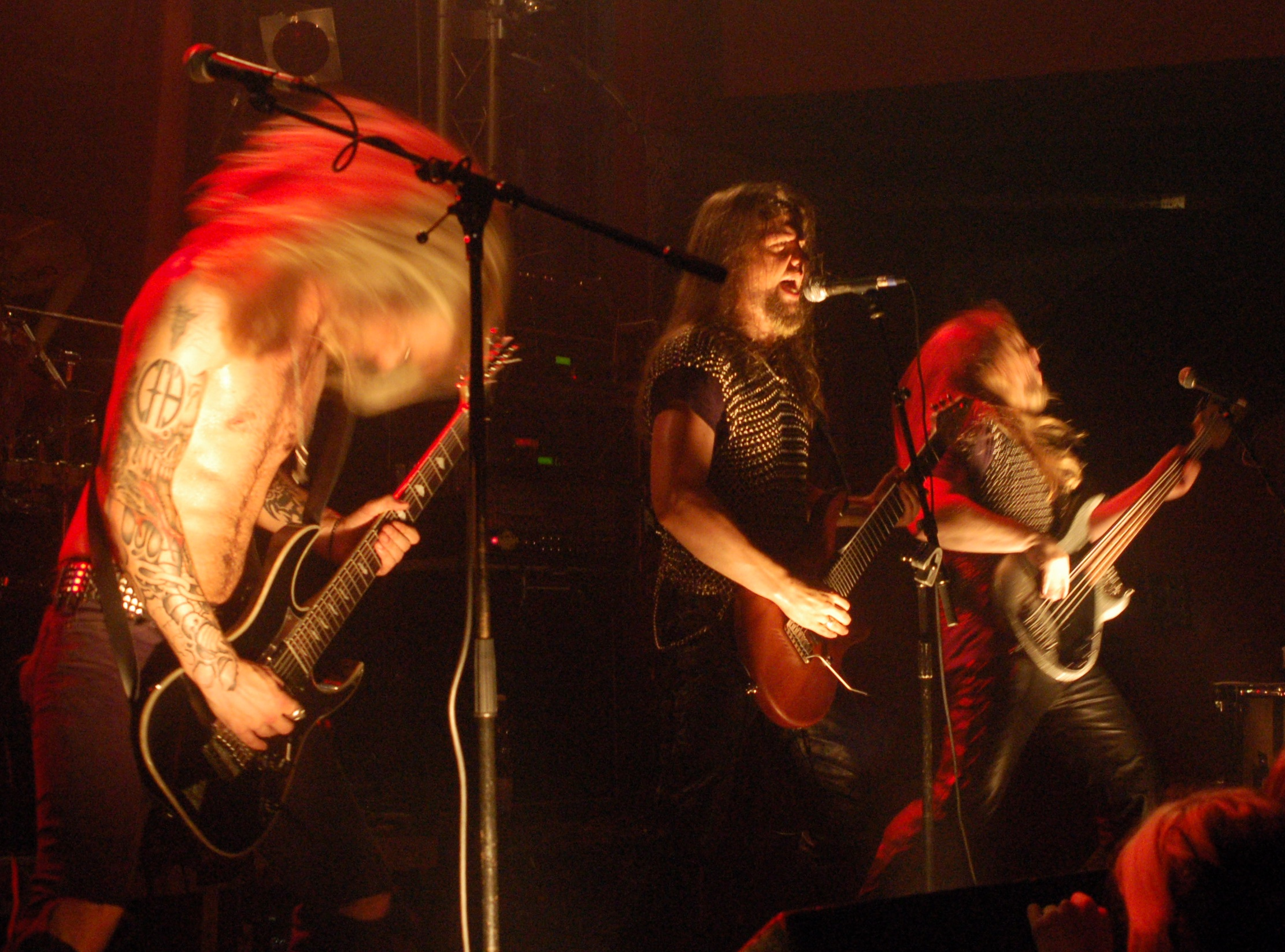
With influences that include Dream Theater, the Faroe Islanders Týr blend progressive metal with folk music.

The music of folk metal is a diverse collection with bands pursuing different subgenres of heavy metal music. While bands like Primordial and Finntroll perform black metal, other groups such as The Lord Weird Slough Feg ply their trade with a more traditional or power metal base. The German-Norwegian group Midnattsol blends the genre with gothic metal. Progressive tendencies can be found among some bands including Elvenking, Lumsk and Týr. Some bands are known to adopt more than one different styles of heavy metal. Orphaned Land combines folk metal with progressive and doom/death metal. The band formed in 1991, also combining Jewish, Arabic, and other West Asian influences while Ensiferum mix folk music on top of a power and death metal hybrid. A few groups are also known to incorporate the styles of other music genres outside of heavy metal. Examples include the punk rock in the music of Glittertind and the neofolk and post-rock tendencies of Agalloch.

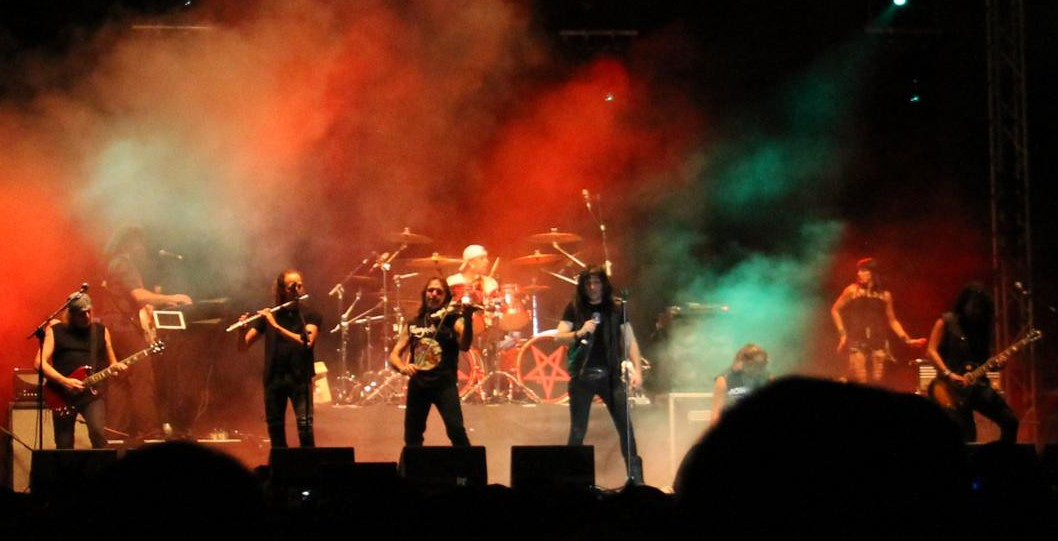
Mägo de Oz in 2013

The folk elements in the genre often reflect the ethnic background of the musicians as is the case for the Finnic folk music in Finntroll, Korpiklaani, and Metsatöll, the Baltic folk music in Skyforger, East Asian influences such as Chthonic's use of Taiwanese folk music or Tengger Cavalry's incorporation of Mongolian throat singing, or the Middle Eastern background of Orphaned Land. However, some bands defy the geographical and ethnical background, like Ymyrgar, who hail from Tunisia but chose to focus on Norse mythology.

Celtic music can be found among such Irish groups as Cruachan and Waylander as well as bands outside Ireland like Ithilien from Belgium, Eluveitie (although Switzerland can be considered a country with a Celtic history), and Tuatha de Danann (from Brazil, a country that has no cultural ties with the Celts whatsoever, despite the similarity of the country's name to an island in Irish myth). Folk music from multiple regions are employed by some groups like Elvenking, Ithilien and Ensiferum.

The genre also offers a variety of atmosphere and moods. A fun and cheerful nature is characteristic of groups like Finntroll and Korpiklaani. Both bands are also noted for playing music that one can dance to. In contrast, other acts such as Thyrfing and Primordial are known for their contemplative atmosphere. Lumsk offers a more mellow style while Agalloch are known for their "depressive ambient" sound.

An epic atmosphere is characteristic of some folk metal bands like Primordial, Moonsorrow, Turisas and the music project Folkearth. Groups like Ensiferum and Wintersun are known to have a melodious side while bands that favor a more blistering or brutal approach can be found in groups like Finntroll and Månegarm.

=== Instruments ===
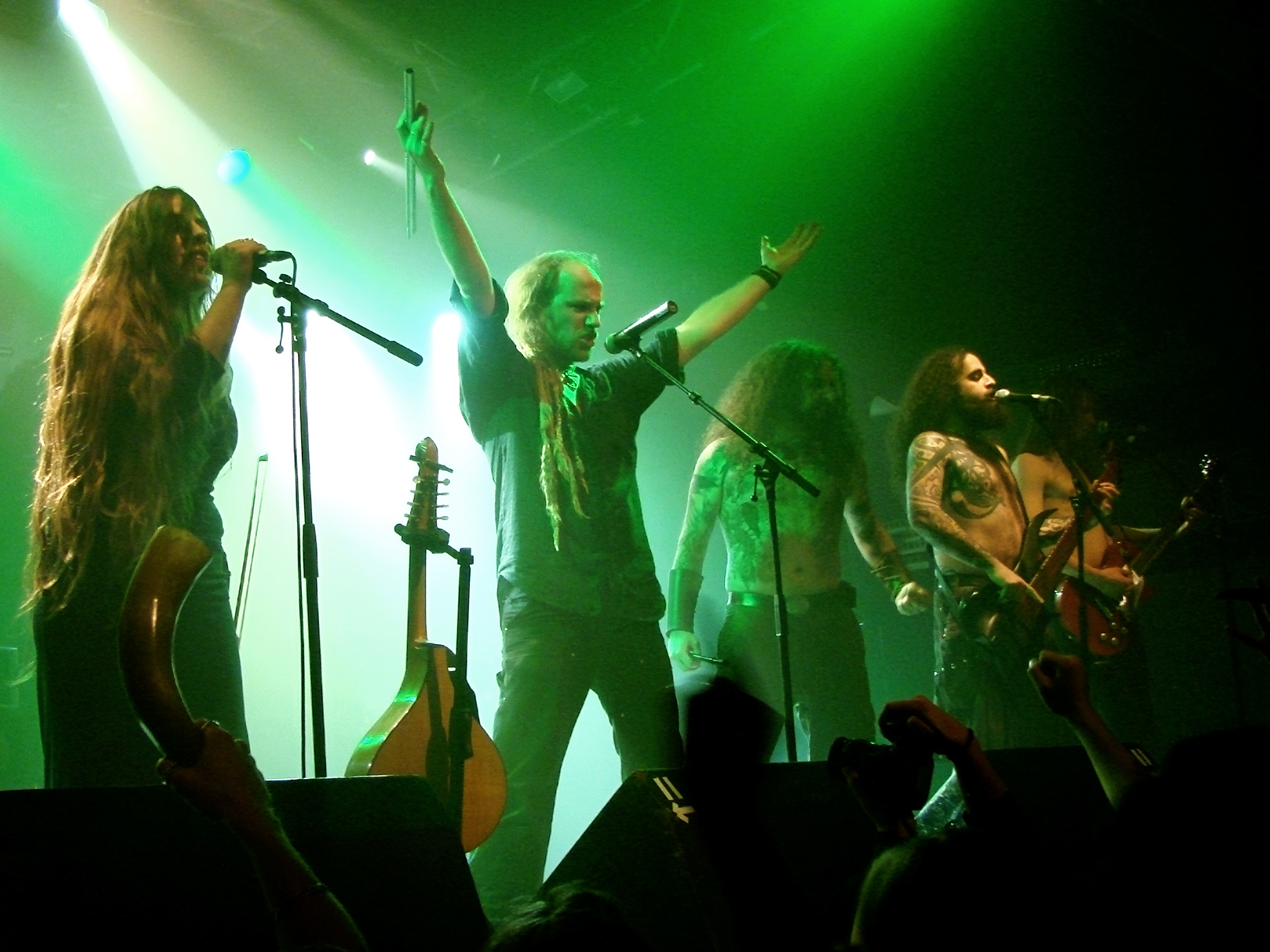
Eluveitie are seen here performing at the 2007 Cernunnos Fest in Paris, France, with a mandola, tin whistle and violin.

Folk metal feature the same typical instruments found in heavy metal music: guitars, bass, drums and vocalist. While a few folk metal groups like Tharaphita discard "any notion of utilising folk instrumentation" and "rely solely on traditional metal instruments," bands in the genre generally rely on folk instruments that range from the common to the exotic. Numerous folk metal acts include a dedicated violinist in their line up. This includes Skyclad, Subway to Sally, Schandmaul, Mägo de Oz, Ithilien, Silent Stream of Godless Elegy, Korpiklaani, Lumsk, Elvenking, Eluveitie and Tuatha de Danann. The tin whistle and flute can be found in such Celtic metal bands as Cruachan, Waylander, Ithilien and Eluveitie. The flute can also be found in other bands such as Metsatöll, Schandmaul and Morgenstern. Medieval bagpipes are used in bands like Folkstone and In Extremo. Some bands are also known to highlight more exotic instruments from their ethnic background or country, including Skyforger's use of the Latvian kokles, Metsatöll's use of the Estonian torupill, Korpiklaani's use of the Finnish kantele, Eluveitie and Ithilien's use of the hurdy-gurdy, and Orphaned Land's use of the oud and saz.

In the absence of folk instruments, other bands in the genre resort to using keyboards to replicate the sound of folk instruments. This includes the aforementioned Storm, Empyrium and Finntroll as well as other acts like Midnattsol. Bands that supplement a folk instrument like the violin with keyboards include Skyclad, Mägo de Oz, and Tuatha de Danann.

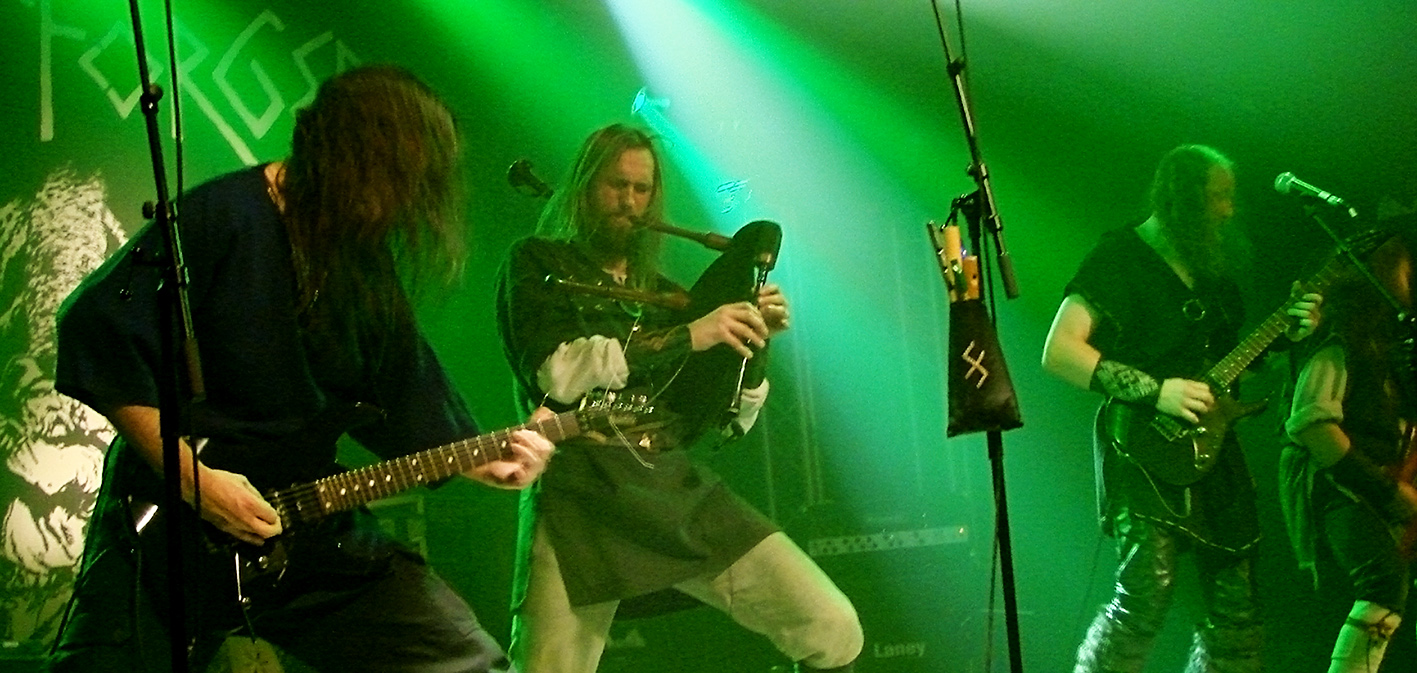
Skyforger, seen here performing with bagpipes at the 2007 Cernunnos Fest in Paris, France, initially mostly relied on a guest musician to perform folk instruments before inviting him to be a fully fledged member of the band.

The large number of instruments that some bands rely on in recording their studio albums can be a hindrance for live performances. While Orphaned Land are able to perform onstage with twenty musicians in their homeland of Israel, they have to rely on a computer to replicate the roles of the guest musicians for concerts elsewhere. Some folk metal acts confine themselves to studio recordings and are not known to perform any live concerts. This includes Folkearth, and Falkenbach. Other folk metal bands expand their regular roster to include more musicians and consequently, it is not uncommon to find bands in the genre featuring six or more members in their line-up. Some of the sextets in the genre are Schandmaul, Cruachan, Korpiklaani, Turisas, and Midnattsol, while septets include Ithilien, Subway to Sally, In Extremo, and Lumsk. Both Silent Stream of Godless Elegy and Eluveitie boast eight members each while the line up of Mägo de Oz totals nine performers. Even when a band includes members dedicated to folk instruments, they might still rely on guest musicians to further enhance their sound. As an example, Lumsk added thirteen guest musicians to the band's seven members on their debut album Åsmund Frægdegjevar. At times, guest musicians are known to become full-fledged members of the band, as was the case in Skyforger and Turisas.

=== Vocals ===
Shaman's "Il Lea Voibmi" (2002)
Regular heavy metal singing is followed by traditional yoik vocals in this 21 second sample from Shaman's second album Shamániac.

Orphaned Land's "The Kiss Of Babylon (The Sins)" (2004)
Jewish singing performed by Shlomit Levi followed by Kobi Farhi in this 30 second sample from Orphaned Land's third album Mabool.

Khepri's "The Fangs of Apep" (2019)
An example of middle eastern vocals often heard in oriental metal in this 15 second sample from "BellyMetal 2" by Khepri, an ancient Egyptian-themed instrumental oriental metal act from the United Kingdom.

The diverse range of music styles and instruments is matched by a variety of vocal styles in the genre. From the "spine-chilling death shrieks" in Finntroll to the black metal rasps of Skyforger or Moonsorrow, there is no shortage of extreme vocals in folk metal. Other bands to feature extreme vocals include Cadacross, Ensiferum, Ithilien and Equilibrium. In contrast, bands like Mägo de Oz and Metsatöll are known to feature "clean" singing in line with their more traditional metal approach. Numerous other bands in the genre are known to feature both extreme vocals and clean singing. This includes Primordial, Turisas, Windir and Wintersun.

Traditional folk singing can also be found among some folk metal bands. The yoik vocals of Jonne Järvelä have been featured in varying degrees in the music of Shaman, Finntroll and Korpiklaani. Folk singing or folk-inspired singing can also be heard in the music of Equilibrium, Metsatöll, Skyforger and Orphaned Land. The music of Orphaned Land also features the use of chants and choirs, commonly encountered in the genre of folk metal. Bands that are known to use a choir include Arkona, Turisas, Lumsk and Eluveitie, while chants can be found in the music of Týr and Windir. Some bands like Falconer and Thyrfing are also known to feature "yo-ho-ho folk melodies" in their vocals to suit their Viking metal style.

Orphaned Land mostly uses English lyrics, but they are known to feature other languages as they "go well with the music and also sound more exotic and unique." Týr has also been known to use multiple languages in their music. Other bands in the genre are known to sing exclusively or almost entirely in their native language, including Mägo de Oz in Spanish, Moonsorrow in Finnish, Metsatöll in Estonian and Lumsk in Norwegian. Bands in the medieval metal subgenre also tend to sing largely or entirely in their German language, including Subway to Sally, Morgenstern and Letzte Instanz.

Lead female singers are not uncommon in the genre and can be found in Cruachan, Otyg, Lumsk, Arkona, Celtian and Midnattsol. Other groups like Orphaned Land and Elvenking have employed guest female vocalists in their music.

=== Lyrics ===
Popular subjects in folk metal include paganism, nature, fantasy, mythology and history.

Folk metal has been associated with paganism ever since its inception, when Martin Walkyier left his former band Sabbat to form Skyclad, in part because the band "wasn't going to go far enough down the pagan, British way that we wanted to do it." Consequently, the lyrics of Skyclad have been known to deal with pagan matters. The band Cruachan was also founded by a self-described pagan, Keith Fay. For Ville Sorvali of Moonsorrow, the label "pagan metal" is preferred "because that describes the ideological points in the music, but doesn’t say anything about the music itself." Other bands that also prefer to use the term "pagan metal" as a self-description include Cruachan, Eluveitie, Obtest and Skyforger. In contrast to bands with pagan themes, some folk metal bands such as Orphaned Land have themes of Abrahamic religion.

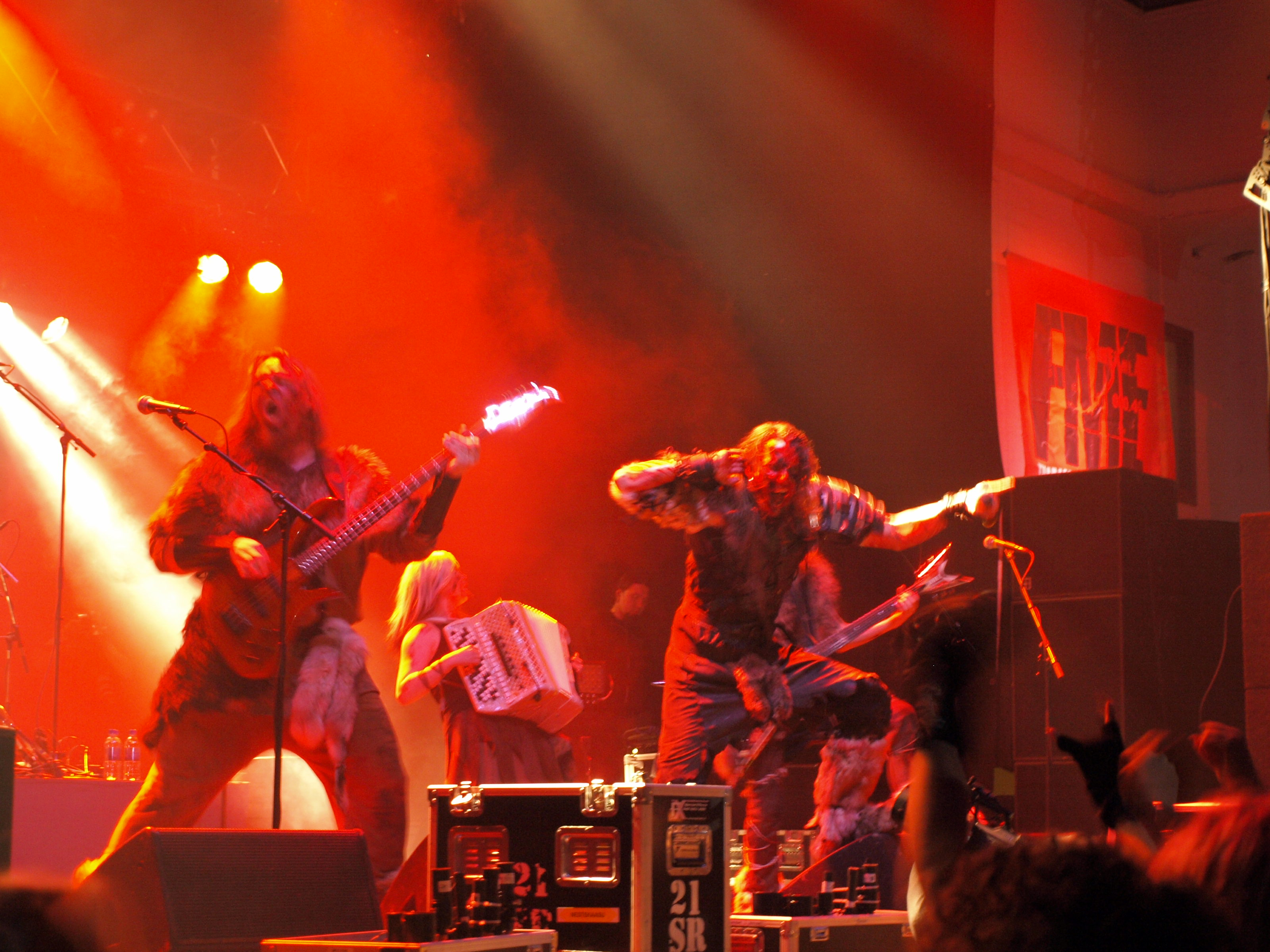
Turisas, seen here performing in 2008, have tackled such issues as the glorification of war through the use of fantasy-themed lyrics.

Nature is a strong influence to many folk metal bands. Groups such as Korpiklaani, Elvenking, Midnattsol and Vintersorg have all based lyrics on the subject. For the band Agalloch, nature is an embraced theme "because we are siding with what is essentially the victim in a relationship where humankind is a disease." All the members of Skyclad are supporters of "organisations like Greenpeace and others, for those are the ones who stand up and take on the battle" between "people who want to save the planet, and people who want to destroy it."

The pioneers of the genre Skyclad avoided fantasy lyrics because "there was already enough fantasy in the world, told to us by our politicians every day." Nonetheless, other folk metal bands have been known to feature fantasy themes in their lyrics including Ensiferum, Midnattsol and Cruachan. For Elvenking, fantasy themes are used "as a metaphor to cover deeper meanings." Similarly, the fantasy themes in Turisas belie the coverage of issues "that are deeper and have greater significance."

The Celtic metal subgenre is known to feature lyrics based on Celtic mythology. The history of the Celts is another popular source for the lyrics of Celtic metal bands like Cruachan, Eluveitie, Primordial and Mael Mórdha. Norse mythology can be found in the lyrics of such Scandinavian bands as Falkenbach, Týr, Finntroll and Mithotyn. Skyforger is known for featuring lyrics based on both the history and mythology of their Latvian culture. Other bands that have treated history to song include Falconer and Slechtvalk.

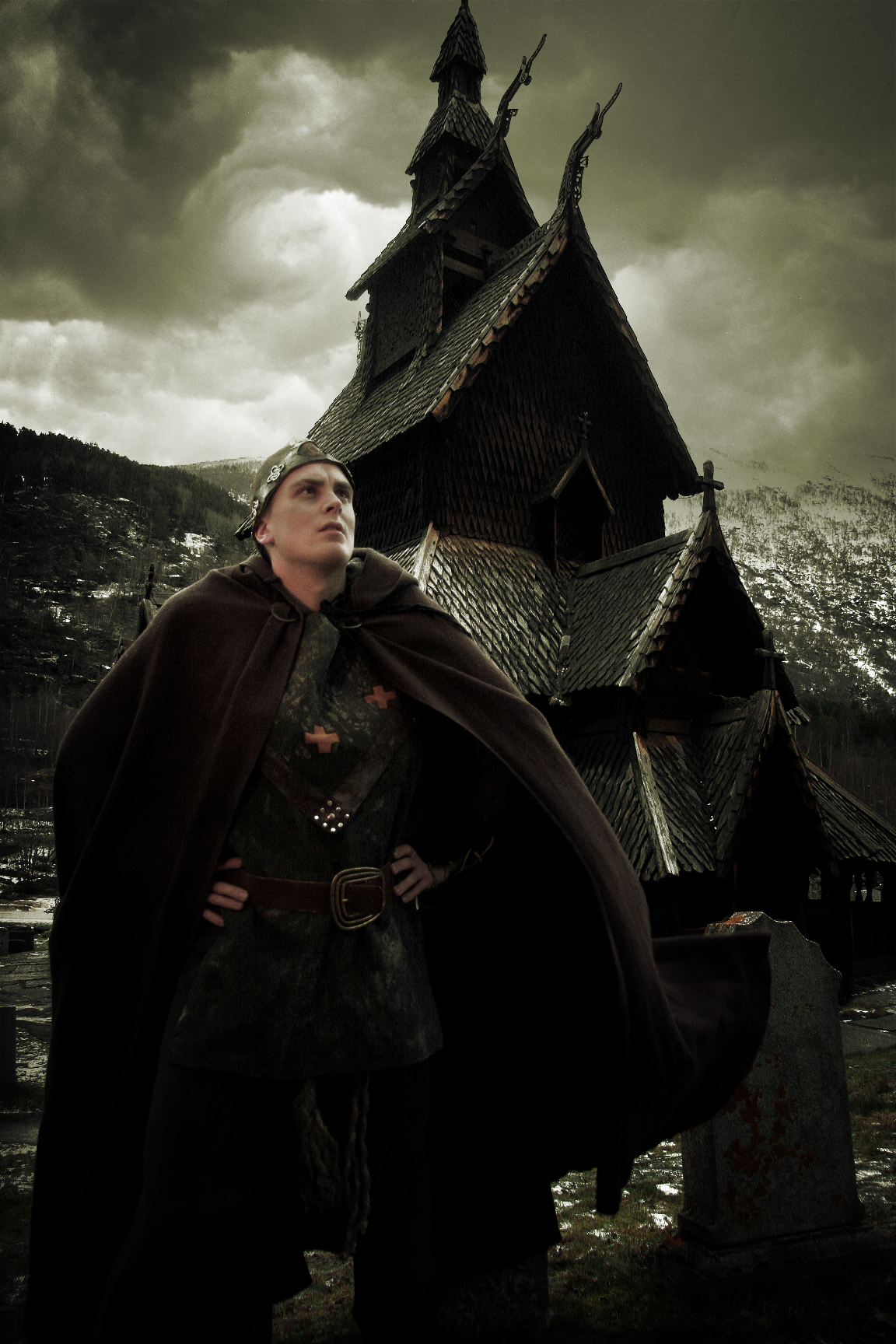
Some bands, like Torbjørn Sandvik in Glittertind, have uttered socialist sentiments in statements explaining album concepts. Picture from Borgund Stave Church in Sogn og Fjordane (2009).

Many black metal bands have been known to cross into folk metal, with examples including Drudkh, Peste Noire, Gris, Panopticon, and Primordial, as well as many National Socialist black metal (NSBM) bands like Nokturnal Mortum, or Russia's Forest, Temnozor, and Kroda. On the other side of the political landscape, some folk metal bands have uttered explicit socialist sentiments. For example the aforementioned Glittertind made a leftist statement against neoliberalism in their album booklet when re-releasing the record Til Dovre Faller on Napalm Records in May 2009.

The original folk metal band Skyclad was also known to deal with serious political subjects but through lyrics that were littered with puns and humor. Other bands have continued to feature fun and humorous lyrics. This includes Finntroll with their obsession on trolls. The lyrics of Korpiklaani also "focused on having a good time, drinking [and] partying." In a review of Turisas' The Varangian Way album, James Christopher Monger of Allmusic commented that some listeners might be put off by "the concept of grown men in pelts" singing such lyrics as "come with us to the south, write your name on our roll." Heri Joensen of Týr contends that a listener needs to be confident in his masculinity to listen to such traditional Faeroese lyrics as his own "young lads, happy lads, step upon the floor, dance merrily."

Unlike any other, the Belgian folk metal band Ithilien preferred to focus their lyrics on very personal subjects such as loss, perseverance or grief. The album Shaping the Soul is for example constructed based on Elisabeth Kubler-Ross model of the mourning process.

== See also ==
- Pagan metal
- Viking metal
- List of folk metal bands
