= List of Celtic metal bands =

This is a list of artists who play Celtic metal, a form of folk metal that combines Celtic rock with various styles of heavy metal music.

Band	Country	Started	Notes
Cruachan	Ireland	1992	
Eluveitie	Switzerland	2002	
Geasa	Ireland	1994	
Gun Ghaol	Scotland	2023	
Hyubris	Portugal	1998	
Leah	Canada	2011	
Mael Mórdha	Ireland	1998	
Mägo de Oz	Spain	1988	
Primordial	Ireland	1991	
Skiltron	Argentina	2004	
Suidakra	Germany	1994	
Thanateros	Germany	1999	
Tuatha de Danann	Brazil	1995	
Waylander	Northern Ireland	1993	
