= Storm Before Calm =

Studio album by Primordial
- Released: 24 June 2002
- Recorded: January 2002
- Studio: Academy Studios (Dewsbury, West Yorkshire)
- Genre: Pagan metal, black metal, folk metal
- Length: 46:18
- Label: Hammerheart
- Producer: Mags

Primordial chronology
Spirit the Earth Aflame (2000)	Storm Before Calm (2002)	The Gathering Wilderness (2005)

Storm Before Calm is the fourth studio album by Irish extreme metal band Primordial. It was released in 2002.

== Track listing ==
All lyrics are written by A.A. Nemtheanga, except "Hosting of the Sidhe" by W. B. Yeats; all music is composed by Ciáran MacUiliam, except "Sons of the Morrigan" by MacUiliam and Pól MacAmlaigh.

No.	Title	Length
1.	"The Heretics Age"	6:16
2.	"Fallen to Ruin"	9:29
3.	"Cast to the Pyre"	7:06
4.	"What Sleeps Within"	4:57
5.	"Sun's First Rays"	3:12
6.	"Sons of the Morrigan"	8:09
7.	"Hosting of the Sidhe"	7:09
Total length:		46:18

The UK edition of the album has an 8th track titled "The Burning Season" – 8:45

== Credits ==
- Alan Averill – vocals
- Ciáran MacUiliam – guitar
- Feargal Flannery – guitar
- Pól "Paul" MacAmlaigh – bass
- Simon O'Laoghaire – drums
