= Honour Amongst Chaos =

Studio album by Waylander
- Released: June 8, 2008
- Genre: Celtic metal, folk metal, pagan metal
- Length: 66:06
- Label: Listenable
- Producer: Dave Briggs

Waylander chronology
The Light, the Dark and the Endless Knot (2001)	Honour Amongst Chaos (2008)	Kindred Spirits (2012)

Professional ratings
Review scores
Source	Rating
Metal.de	8/10
Rock Hard	7/10

Honour Amongst Chaos is the third studio album by the Northern Irish Celtic metal band Waylander. It was released in 2008 through Listenable Records, and was the band's first album for seven years. Some versions of the album feature a re-recording of the song Born to the Fight with new lyrics as a bonus track.

Blabbermouth rated the album seven out of ten, describing it as "a fine example of the good things that can happen when the world of folk and metal are brought together."

== Track listing ==
No.	Title	Length
1.	"As the Deities Clash"	7:45
2.	"Walk with Honour"	5:00
3.	"Beyond the Ninth Wave"	7:56
4.	"Galloping Gaels"	6:17
5.	"To Dine in the Otherworld"	10:16
6.	"Usurpers of Our Legacy"	8:24
7.	"Taker of Heads"	6:02
8.	"Elemental Chaos"	8:44
9.	"Brú na Bóinne"	5:42
10.	"Born to the Fight" (bonus track on some versions)	3:42
Total length:		69:48

== Band line-up ==
- Ard Chieftain O'Hagan - vocals
- Saul McMichael - guitars
- Michael Proctor - bass, backing vocals
- Den Ferran - drums, percussion, backing vocals
- Dave Briggs - whistle, mandolin, backing vocals

== Guest musicians ==
- Gareth Murdock - additional guitars, backing vocals
- Mairtin McCormaic - additional whistle on tracks 2,3, 6, 7, 8
- Neil Speers - uilleann pipes
- Aidan McGillian - bodhrán
- Sarah McGoldrick - flute
- Barry Connolly - fiddle
