= Folk-Lore =

Studio album by Cruachan
- Released: February 4, 2002
- Genre: Celtic metal
- Length: 45:41
- Label: Hammerheart
- Producer: Denis Buckley, Shane MacGowan

Cruachan chronology
| The Middle Kingdom (2000) | Folk-Lore (2002) | Pagan (2004) |

Singles from Folk-Lore
- 1. "Ride On" Released: 2001

Folk-Lore is the third studio album by Irish folk metal band Cruachan released in 2002 on Hammerheart Records.

It received a 9.5 out of ten rating from Chronicles of Chaos.

== Track listing ==
| No. | Title | Length |
|---|---|---|
| 1. | "Bloody Sunday" | 4:15 |
| 2. | "The Victory Reel" (instrumental) | 1:21 |
| 3. | "Death of a Gael" | 5:38 |
| 4. | "The Rocky Road to Dublin" (traditional) | 3:07 |
| 5. | "Ossian's Return" | 4:44 |
| 6. | "Spancill Hill" (traditional) | 6:00 |
| 7. | "The Children of Lir" | 5:08 |
| 8. | "Ride On" | 4:41 |
| 9. | "Susie Moran" | 4:11 |
| 10. | "Exiles" | 6:36 |
| 11. | "To Invoke the Horned God" (digipack version bonus track) | 6:02 |
| Total length: | | 51:43 |

== Personnel ==
- Keith Fay - lead and acoustic guitars, vocals, keyboards, bouzouki, mandolin, banjo, bodhrán, percussion
- Karen Gilligan - vocals, percussion
- Joe Farrell - drums, percussion
- John Clohessy - bass, vocals (backing)
- John O'Fathaigh - Irish flute, tin whistle, low whistle, recorder, cover art

=== Additional personnel ===
- Shane MacGowan - vocals on "Spancill Hill" and "Ride On", producer
- Louise Fay - spoken on "Ossian's Return"
- Liz Keller - fiddle, violin
- Diane O'Keefe - cello
- Denis Buckley - producer, engineering
- Marco Jeurissen - artwork, layout
