= Alan Averill =

Irish heavy metal vocalist

A.A. Nemtheanga
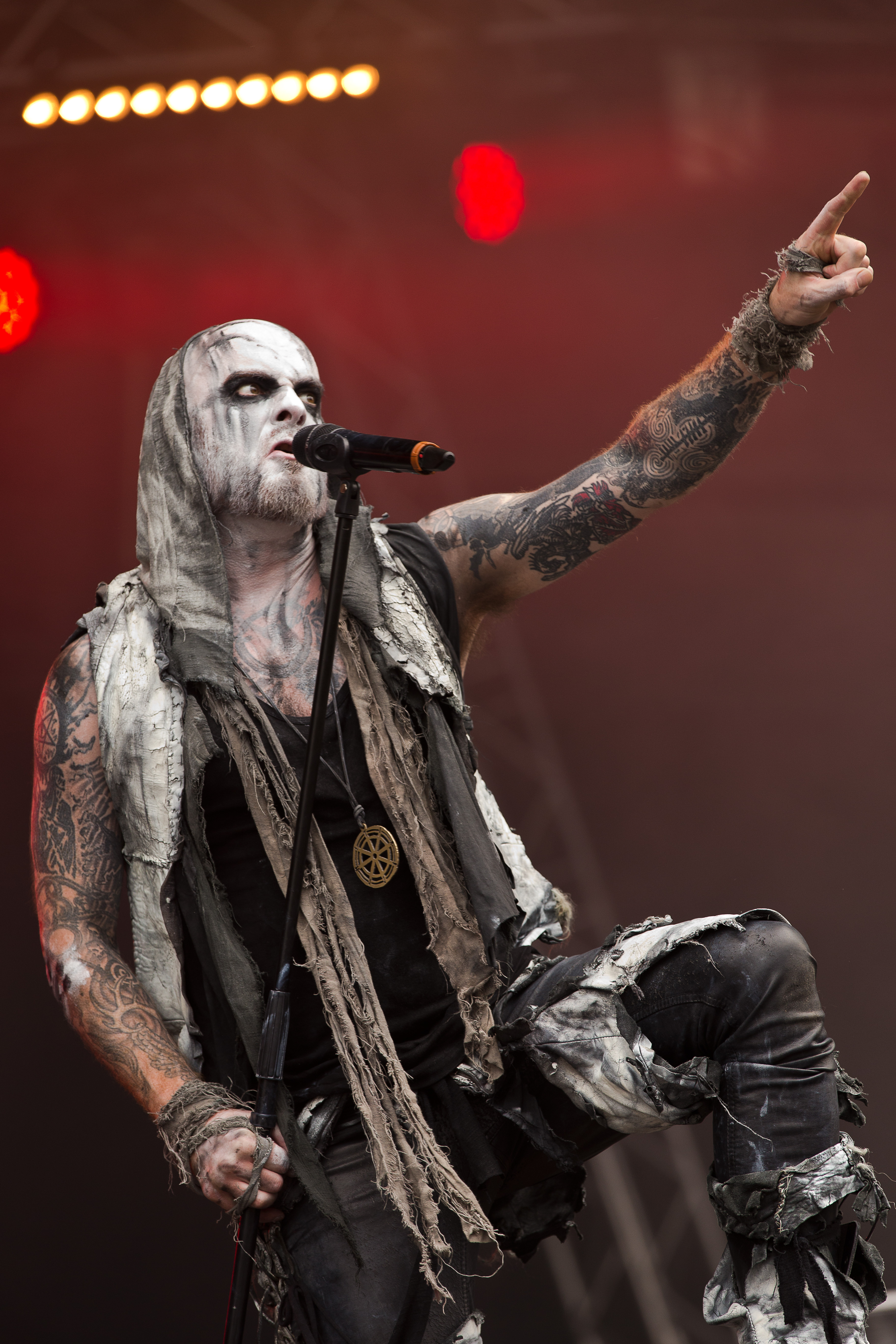
- Averill with Primordial in 2016

Background information
- Also known as: Alan Nemtheanga
- Born: Alan Maurice Averill; 26 August 1975 (age 51)
- Origin: Ireland
- Genres: Pagan metal; black metal; folk metal; doom metal
- Occupations: Singer; musician; songwriter
- Instruments: Vocals; bass guitar
- Years active: 1991–present
- Member of: Primordial; Dread Sovereign; Twilight of the Gods
- Formerly of: Blood Revolt; Plagued; Void of Silence; The Nest

Alan Maurice Averill (born 26 August 1975), also known as A.A. Nemtheanga, is an Irish musician best known as the lead singer of the pagan black metal band Primordial. He has also participated in several side projects, including Dread Sovereign (doom metal), Blood Revolt (war metal), and Twilight of the Gods (heavy metal).

== Life and career ==
Averill was raised in Sutton on Dublin's Northside and attended Mount Temple Comprehensive School. Averill joined Primordial in August 1991 after seeing an advertisement posted by the band in a local music store.

He was the vocalist for the doom metal band Void of Silence and sung on the band's third album, Human Antithesis, before departing in 2009.

Averill traveled to Canada early to record vocals for Indoctrine, the debut album from Blood Revolt with Vermin and J. Read (Axis of Advance, Conqueror). The album was released by Profound Lore and Invictus in late 2010.

He also fronts Twilight of the Gods, a supergroup, originally intended as a live-only Bathory tribute, that includes drummer Nick Barker (ex-Cradle of Filth, ex-Dimmu Borgir, ex-Testament, ex-Exodus), guitarist Rune Eriksen (Aura Noir, ex-Mayhem), guitarist Patrik Lindgren (Thyrfing), and bassist Frode Glesnes (Einherjer). The band released its debut, Fire on the Mountain, on 27 September 2013 on Season of Mist.

Averill also contributes to other aspects of the music industry. In 2008, he received a journalism degree from Dublin City University and is a staff writer for Zero Tolerance magazine. In 2010, he started working as an A&R representative for Metal Blade Records and formed the Poison Tongue Records imprint.

== Discography ==
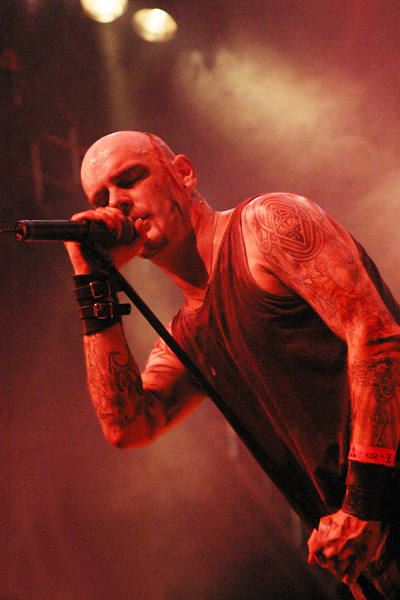
Averill in 2007

=== With Primordial ===
- Imrama (full-length, 1995)
- Primordial / Katatonia (split, 1997)
- A Journey's End (full-length, 1998)
- The Burning Season (EP, 1999)
- Spirit the Earth Aflame (full-length, 2000)
- Storm Before Calm (full-length, 2002)
- The Gathering Wilderness (full-length, 2005)
- Primordial / Mael Mórdha (split, 2005)
- To the Nameless Dead (full-length, 2007)
- Redemption at the Puritan's Hand (full-length, 2011)
- Where Greater Men Have Fallen (full-length, 2014)
- Exile Amongst the Ruins (full-length, 2018)
- How It Ends (full-length, 2023)

=== With Blood Revolt ===
- Indoctrine (full-length, 2010)

=== With Dread Sovereign ===
- All Hell's Martyrs (full-length, 2013)
- For Doom the Bell Tolls (full-length, 2017)
- Alchemical Warfare (full length, 2021)

=== With Plagued ===
- Plagued / Trimonium (split, 2007)

=== With Twilight of the Gods ===
- Fire on the Mountain (full-length, 2013)

=== With Void of Silence ===
- Human Antithesis (full-length, 2004)

=== As a guest or session musician ===
- Rom 5:12 – Marduk (full-length, 2007)
- Evocation I – The Arcane Dominion – Eluveitie (full-length, 2009)
- Rise of the Bastard Deities – Morphosis (full-length, 2009)
- Aealo – Rotting Christ (full-length, 2010)
- Vuur van Verzet – Heidevolk (full-length, 2018)
- Ächtung, Baby! – Rome
- Mother Bury Your Sons – Me and that Man
- The Imperious Horizon (2024) – Winterfylleth – vocals on the song "In Silent Grace"
- Ascension - Paradise Lost - vocals on the song "Salvation"
