= How It Ends (Primordial album) =

Studio album by Primordial
- Released: 29 September 2023
- Genre: Pagan metal; black metal; folk metal
- Length: 65:54
- Label: Metal Blade
- Producer: Chris Fielding

Primordial chronology
Exile Amongst the Ruins (2018)	How It Ends (2023)

Singles from How It Ends
- 1. "Victory Has 1000 Fathers, Defeat Is an Orphan" Released: 16 August 2023; 2. "Pilgrimage to the World's End" Released: 5 September 2023

How It Ends is the tenth studio album by Irish extreme metal band Primordial. It was released on 29 September 2023 through Metal Blade Records and was produced by Chris Fielding.

== Reception ==
Professional ratings
Review scores
Source	Rating
Distorted Sound	8/10
Metal Storm	7/10
New Noise Magazine	4/5 stars

The album received generally positive reviews from critics. Gavin Brown of Distorted Sound scored the album 8 out of 10 and called the album "that not only celebrates Primordial as a band from start to finish, as well as their history and their legacy, but it also salutes everything that they stand for, and the fact that they are still here doing this after all these years must be appreciated and applauded in equal measure." New Noise Magazine rated the album 4 out of 5 and said: "The first half of How It Ends exemplifies exactly what makes Primordial so revered. It makes the unlikely combination of black metal and Irish folk not only work, but seem like an extremely natural combination. Primordial was the first band to reach that conclusion, as they have demonstrated over nine albums. Here, their rebellious attitude truly shines. Nemtheanga has stated that this might be the beginning of the end for the band. If that is the case, How It Ends can hold its head high with The Gathering Wilderness and To the Nameless Dead as being amongst the band's best releases."

== Track listing ==
How It Ends track listing
No.	Title	Length
1.	"How It Ends"	7:50
2.	"Ploughs to Rust, Swords to Dust"	7:35
3.	"We Shall Not Serve"	7:18
4.	"Traidisiúnta"	2:12
5.	"Pilgrimage to the World's End"	7:07
6.	"Nothing New Under the Sun"	7:11
7.	"Call to Cernunnos"	5:59
8.	"All Against All"	8:48
9.	"Death Holy Death"	5:40
10.	"Victory Has 1000 Fathers, Defeat Is an Orphan"	6:14
Total length:		65:54

== Personnel ==
Primordial

- Alan Averill "Nemtheanga" – vocals
- Ciáran MacUiliam – guitars
- Pól MacAmhlaigh – bass
- Simon Ó Laoghaire – drums

Additional personnel

- Chris Fielding – production, engineering, mixing
- James Plotkin – mastering
- Paul McCarroll – artwork, design
- Ray Keenaghan and Feargal Flannery – photography
