= The Morrigan's Call =

Studio album by Cruachan
- Released: November 17, 2006
- Recorded: January/February 2006
- Studios: Sun Studios, Dublin
- Genres: Celtic metal, folk metal, black metal
- Length: 47:08
- Languages: English, Irish
- Label: Karmageddon Media
- Producer: Gail Liebling

Cruachan chronology
Pagan (album) (2004)	The Morrigan's Call (2006)	Blood on the Black Robe (2011)

Singles from The Morrigan's Call
- 1. "The Very Wild Rover" Released: May 2006

The Morrigan's Call is the fifth studio album by Irish folk metal band Cruachan released in 2006.

Scream Magazine gave a 4 out of 6 rating, asking rhetorically: "The Morrigan's Call does not exactly present anything new from the band, but what does that matter as long as the melodies are beautiful and the sound consequent?".

== Track listing ==
No.	Title	Length
1.	"Shelob"	3:05
2.	"The Brown Bull of Cooley"	5:26
3.	"Coffin Ships" (instrumental)	1:50
4.	"The Great Hunger"	6:10
5.	"The Old Woman in the Woods"	1:52
6.	"Ungoliant"	3:56
7.	"The Morrigan's Call"	1:52
8.	"Téir Abhaile Riú"	4:16
9.	"Wolfe Tone"	2:58
10.	"The Very Wild Rover"	4:04
11.	"Cuchulainn"	6:24
12.	"Diarmuid and Grainne"	5:15
Total length:		47:08

== Personnel ==
- Keith Fay - guitars, vocals, keyboards, bouzouki, mandolin, banjo, bodhrán, percussion
- Karen Gilligan - vocals
- Joe Farrell - drums, percussion
- John Ryan - fiddle, violin, mandocello, bowed bass, banjo, death grunts
- John Clohessy - bass, aldotrube

=== Additional personnel ===
- Aine O'Dwyer - Celtic harp
- John O'Fathaigh - Irish flute, tin whistle, low whistle, recorder, cover art
- Gail Liebling - producer, recording, mixing
- Matthias Zimmer - layout
