= Blood Revolt =

Irish extreme metal band

Background information
- Genres: War metal
- Years active: 2010–2012
- Labels: Profound Lore Records
- Members: A.A. Nemtheanga; James Read; Chris Ross (aka Vermin)

Blood Revolt were an Irish war metal band featuring A.A. Nemtheanga of Primordial along with J. Read and Vermin, who previously played together in Axis of Advance and Revenge. They released one album, 2010's Indoctrine.

== Indoctrine (2010) ==
Described as "intensely militaristic", Blood Revolt attracted controversy with their 2010 debut album, Indoctrine, due to lyrical content that assumed the perspective of a suicide bomber. Nemtheanga explained that the violence of the lyrics was based in realistic subject matter rather than "cartoon imagery or fantastical pseudo religious hocus pocus". For Nemtheanga, the subject matter is more effective owing to its realism:

this is the sniper filing down the pin before picking off innocents, this is the suicide bomber's sweaty greasy hand on the ignition, dead bodies piled in the politics of the mass grave. Unforgiving and unrelenting elitism.

The concept of Indoctrine describes "a man's descent from alienation to martyrdom in eight chapters through religious indoctrination, madness, to bomb making, serial killing and ultimately revenge. It could be set anywhere throughout this world; all you need to do is turn on the news and you can see the inspiration".

While some have interpreted the lyrics as cautioning against religious fanaticism, Nemtheanga clarified that this was incorrect: "There's absolutely no caution whatsoever, in fact if anything, it praises the dedication and sacrifice of the character. The album doesn't judge, that's not the point".

== Members ==
- A.A. Nemtheanga – vocals
- James Read – drums
- Chris Ross (aka Vermin) – guitars

== Discography ==
- Indoctrine (Profound Lore, 2010)
