= Tuatha na Gael =

Studio album by Cruachan
- Released: April 30, 1995
- Recorded: 8–12 February 1995
- Genre: Celtic metal, black metal
- Length: 56:51
- Label: Nazgul's Eyrie Productions
- Producer: Paul Thomas

Cruachan chronology
Tuatha na Gael (1995)	The Middle Kingdom (2000)

Tuatha na Gael is the debut studio album by Irish folk metal band Cruachan released in 1995. In 2001, Hammerheart Records reissued the album with three bonus tracks.

== Track listing ==
No.	Title	Length
1.	"I Am Tuan" (instrumental)	2:23
2.	"The First Battle of Moytura"	7:45
3.	"Maeve's March"	3:32
4.	"Fall of Gondolin"	8:04
5.	"Cúchulainn"	7:05
6.	"Táin Bó Cuailgne"	8:45
7.	"To Invoke the Horned God"	6:13
8.	"Brian Boru"	4:40
9.	"To Moytura We Return"	8:24
Total length:		56:51

2001 reissue bonus tracks
No.	Title	Length
10.	"Return"	6:33
11.	"Erinsong"	4:54
12.	"Óró sé do bheatha abhaile" (traditional)	3:44
Total length:		72:02

- "I Am Tuan" also appears on the band's eighth album Nine Years of Blood.
- "Erinsong" also appears on the band's fourth album Pagan.
- "Óró sé do bheatha abhaile" also appears on the band's second album The Middle Kingdom.

== Personnel ==
- Keith Fay - vocals, guitars, mandolin, bodhrán
- Leon Bias - guitars, mandolin, bouzouki
- John Clohessy - bass
- Collete O'Fathaigh - keyboards
- John O' Fathaigh - Irish flute, tin whistle, low whistle
- Jay O'Niell - drums, percussion

=== Additional personnel ===
- Paul Kerns - backing vocals on "The First Battle of Moytura" and "Cúchulainn"
- Niamh Hanlon - uilleann pipes
