= Imrama =

Studio album by Primordial
- Released: September 20, 1995
- Recorded: November 1994
- Studio: Skerrieshell Studio
- Genre: Black metal, pagan metal, folk metal
- Length: 45:46; 58:33 (2001 reissue)
- Label: Cacophonous Records

Primordial chronology
Dark Romanticism (1993)	Imrama (1995)	A Journey's End (1998)

Professional ratings
Review scores
Source	Rating
AllMusic	3.5/5 stars

Imrama is the debut studio album by Irish extreme metal band Primordial. It was originally released in 1995. In 2001, it was re-issued by Hammerheart Records with two bonus tracks. It was reissued again, this time by Metal Blade Records in 2009 as CD/DVD digipack in slipcase. It is a part of collector series of the first 4 albums reissues.

Immrama, meaning 'voyages' or literally 'rowings about' refers to a category of medieval Irish Christian literature in which a protagonist sets about voyaging in penance for sins committed. Medieval catalogues of literature see this genre as contrasting with Eachtra, 'expeditions' or 'adventures' in which the protagonist visits the Otherworld of Irish traditional lore.

In Ireland, an overwhelmingly English speaking country, usage of the Irish language is an outward expression of Irish identity, which is a central theme of Primordial's aesthetic and appeal.

== Track listing ==
All lyrics are written by Alan Averill; all music is composed by Primordial.

No.	Title	Length
1.	"Fuil Ársa"	4:44
2.	"Infernal Summer"	6:11
3.	"Here I Am King"	4:24
4.	"The Darkest Flame"	5:18
5.	"The Fires..."	5:23
6.	"Mealltach"	1:27
7.	"Let the Sun Set on Life Forever"	4:26
8.	"To the Ends of the Earth"	5:29
9.	"Beneath a Bronze Sky"	3:26
10.	"Awaiting the Dawn"	5:00
11.	"The Calling" (2001 reissue bonus track)	4:54
12.	"Among the Lazarae" (2001 reissue bonus track)	7:53
Total length:		58:33

Note: The "Dark Romanticism" demo tracks are part of the 2009 reissue

DVD

Live Cork City, Ireland, February 1994:

1. Among the Lazarae
2. Let the Sun Set on Life Forever
3. To Enter Pagan
4. The Darkest Flame
5. The Fires

== Credits ==
- Alan Averill – vocals
- Ciáran MacUiliam – guitars, bodhrán, tin-whistle, keyboards
- Pól "Paul" MacAmlaigh – bass
- Derek "D." MacAmlaigh – drums, percussion
- Andrew Radley – engineering, mixing
- Mags – mixing
