= The Light, the Dark and the Endless Knot =

Studio album by Waylander
- Released: 22 October 2001
- Recorded: 2001 at No Sweat Studios
- Genre: Celtic metal, pagan metal
- Length: 58:22
- Label: Blackend

Waylander chronology
Reawakening Pride Once Lost (1998)	The Light, the Dark and the Endless Knot (2001)	Honour Amongst Chaos (2008)

The Light, the Dark and the Endless Knot is the second studio album by the Northern Irish Celtic metal band Waylander. It was released in 2001.

== Critical reception ==
The album was reviewed by Metalitalia.com, MetalReviews.com, Rock Hard, Teeth of the Divine, and Vampster.

== Track listing ==
No.	Title	Length
1.	"Balor of the Evil Eye"	7:42
2.	"Anu's Retribution"	6:05
3.	"The Light, the Dark and the Endless Knot"	7:52
4.	"To Rule Was Preordained"	5:26
5.	"Morrigan's Domain"	9:25
6.	"After the Fall"	6:50
7.	"Release the Spirit Within"	9:01
8.	"Plague of Ages"	6:01
Total length:		58:22

== Band line-up ==
- Ciaran O'Hagan - vocals
- Dermot O'Hagan - guitars
- Peter Boylan - guitars
- Mairtin MacCormaic - tin whistle
- Michael Proctor - bass
- Bo Murphy - drums
