= Axis of Advance =

Canadian death metal band

- Origin: Edmonton, Alberta
- Genres: Black metal, death metal, war metal
- Years active: 1998–2008
- Labels: Osmose Productions, Catharsis Records, Fifth Division
- Past members: Jason McLeod; Chris Ross; James Read; Paulus Kressman

Axis of Advance was a Canadian death metal band from Edmonton, Alberta, active from 1998 to 2008. Their music was described as "freaked-out, hyper and evil metal...not for the weak and not really for most rational human beings, but it will sound great to those looking for a slice of evil black metal the way it should be done."

== History ==
The band began as Sacramentary Abolishment, which was formed in 1993 by guitarist/vocalist Wör (Jason McLeod), bassist/vocalist Vermina, aka Verminaard (Chris Ross) and drummer Paulus Kressman, who came up with the name. In 1997, Kressman left the band to start the solo project Rites of Thy Degringolade. Wör and Vermin recruited drummer James Read and renamed the band Axis of Advance.

On Halloween 1997, Sacramentary Abolishment released their album The Distracting Stone at Area 51 in Edmonton. Vermin brought a pig's head onto the stage, ripped into it with a battleaxe, then pitched it into the crowd.

In a 1998 interview with Russian Metal, Vermin revealed that the name Sacramentary Abolishment stood for the abolishment of all religious sacrament, and that he believed that "Black metal is strictly a white man's realm." In 1999, the trio was banned from performing at a show in Edmonton for alleged Nazi leanings and symbolism. In 2002, prior to the released of the band's album The List, they issued a press release denying affiliation with the white supremacist movement.

The band toured Europe in 2004, then traveled to Malmö Sweden, where they recorded their album Obey at Berno Studio.

Axis of Advance dissolved in 2008.

Verminaard plays session guitars in Read's main band Revenge, and was involved in Weapon for a short period. Vermin and J. Read play in Blood Revolt with Primordial's A.A. Nemtheanga.

== Discography ==
=== Albums ===
As Sacramentary Abolishment:

- Misanthropy (Cassette Demo), Independent 1994
- Nebulous (Cassette Demo), Independent 1995
- River of Corticone (CD), Catharsis Records 1996 (re-released by Fifth Division, 2006)
- The Distracting Stone (CD), Catharsis Records 1997

As Axis of Advance:

- Strike (CD/LP), Death to Mankind 2001
- The List (CD/LP), Osmose Productions 2002
- Obey (CD/LP), Osmose Productions

=== Singles and EPs ===
- Landline, Catharsis Records 1999
- Purify (mCD/mLP), Osmose Productions 2006

=== Compilation inclusions ===
- Awaiting The Glorious Damnation Of Mankind (vinyl 7-inch EP), Demonion Productions 2001
- The World Domination IV: The 10 Years of Osmose Productions (CD), Osmose Productions 2002
- Apokalyptik Warfare Vol. 1 (CD), Osmose Productions 2003
- Rising of Yog-Sothoth: Tribute to Thergothon (CD), Solitude Records 2009
- Sonic Cathedrals Vol. XXXVIII, 2012
- Death Hammer Vol. 1 digital release 2013
- Cvlt Nation 7th Anniversary Mixtape digital release 2018
