= Dawning of a New Age =

Demo album by Waylander
- Released: March 1996
- Recorded: No Sweat Productions, Coleraine, February 1996
- Genre: Celtic metal, folk metal
- Length: 21:11
- Label: Self-released
- Producer: Clive 'Cosmic' Culbertson; Waylander

Waylander chronology
Once Upon an Era (1994)	Dawning of a New Age (1996)	Reawakening Pride Once Lost (1998)

Dawning of a New Age is the second demo by the Northern Irish Celtic metal band Waylander, released in 1996.

== Track listing ==
No.	Title	Length
1.	"Sunrise"	03:22
2.	"Dawning of a New Age"	03:33
3.	"A Hero's Lament"	07:22
4.	"Emain Macha"	06:54
Total length:		21:11

== Band line-up ==
- Den Ferran - drums
- Ciaran O'Hagan - vocals
- Dermot O'Hagan - guitars
- Michael Proctor - bass
- Clive Culbertson - keyboards
