= Exile Amongst the Ruins =

2018 studio album by Primordial

Studio album by Primordial
- Released: 30 March 2018
- Recorded: September – November 2017
- Studio: Camelot Studios (Dublin)
- Genre: Pagan metal, black metal, folk metal
- Length: 65:33
- Label: Metal Blade
- Producer: Ola Ersfjord

Primordial chronology
Where Greater Men Have Fallen (2014)	Exile Amongst the Ruins (2018)	How It Ends (2023)

Exile Amongst the Ruins is the ninth studio album by Irish extreme metal band Primordial. It was released on 30 March 2018 through Metal Blade Records, and is the last album with Michael O'Floinn as the group's second guitarist.

== Track listing ==
All lyrics are written by A.A. Nemtheanga.

No.	Title	Music	Length
1.	"Nail Their Tongues"	Ciáran MacUiliam	9:00
2.	"To Hell or the Hangman"	MacUiliam	7:16
3.	"Where Lie the Gods"	Micheál O'Floinn	9:11
4.	"Exile Amongst the Ruins"	MacUiliam	7:59
5.	"Upon Our Spiritual Deathbed"	O'Floinn	8:28
6.	"Stolen Years"	MacUiliam	5:15
7.	"Sunken Lungs"	MacUiliam	7:52
8.	"Last Call"	MacUiliam	10:32
Total length:			65:33

== Personnel ==
Primordial

- A.A. Nemtheanga – vocals, lyrics
- Ciáran MacUiliam – guitars
- Michael O'Floinn – guitars
- Pól MacAmlaigh – bass
- Simon O'Laoghaire – drums

Production and art

- Ola Ersfjord – producer, engineer, mixing
- Costin Chioreanu – artwork, layout
- Chris Common – mastering
- Mihai Anghel – photography
- Gareth Averill – photography

== Charts ==
Chart (2018)	Peak position
Austrian Albums (Ö3 Austria)	26
Belgian Albums (Ultratop Wallonia)	197
Hungarian Albums (MAHASZ)	35
German Albums (Offizielle Top 100)	9
Swiss Albums (Schweizer Hitparade)	27
