= The Living and the Dead (Cruachan album) =

Studio album by Cruachan
- Released: 24 March 2023
- Genre: Celtic metal; black metal; folk metal
- Length: 51:55
- Language: English; Irish
- Label: Despotz

Cruachan chronology
Nine Years of Blood (2018)	The Living and the Dead (2023)

Singles from The Living and the Dead
- 1. "The Hawthorn" Released: 2 October 2020; 2. "The Crow" Released: 25 November 2022; 3. "The Reaper" Released: 27 January 2023; 4. "The Witch" Released: 24 February 2023

The Living and the Dead is the ninth studio album by Irish folk metal band Cruachan. The album was released on 24 March 2023 through Despotz Records.

== Critical reception ==
Professional ratings
Review scores
Source	Rating
Rock 'N' Load	8/10

Rock 'N' Load praised the album saying, "In all, The Living and the Dead is a fitting way for Cruachan to celebrate the legacy of both the band and folk-metal as a whole. The blend of folk and metal instruments and styles is exceptional, even for a band that have been engaged with this style for three decades. While it is true that at times there seems to be imagination lacking when it comes to certain guitar riffs, the sheer creativity and intuition displayed elsewhere more than make up for this. The compositions and arrangements are at times absolutely masterful, invoking the talents of classical composers, and the range of emotions evoked throughout the record is certainly something for the band to be proud of. They are set to headline the revered Siege of Limerick festival on Easter Sunday, or, the Ēostre celebration of the Spring Equinox, if you're that way inclined."

== Track listing ==
All tracks are written by Cruachan

The Living and the Dead track listing
No.	Title	Length
1.	"The Living"	2:57
2.	"The Queen"	6:50
3.	"The Hawthorn"	5:04
4.	"The Harvest"	5:21
5.	"The Festival" (featuring Camillus Hiney)	2:50
6.	"The Ghost" (featuring Mathias Lillmåns)	4:22
7.	"The Crow"	5:26
8.	"The Reaper"	4:29
9.	"The Children"	3:35
10.	"The Changeling" (featuring Nella and Jon Campling)	3:31
11.	"The Witch" (featuring John Stuart Dixon)	4:57
12.	"The Dead"	2:33
Total length:		51:55

== Personnel ==
Credits adapted from Discogs.

Cruachan

- Keith Fay – vocals, guitar, banjo, keyboards, bodhrán, mandolin, percussion, Irish bouzouki
- David Quinn – guitar
- Audrey Trainor – violin, viola, cello
- Joe Farrell – bass
- Tom Woodlock – drums, percussion

Additional musicians

- Camillus Hiney – guest accordion on track 5
- Mathias Lillmåns – guest vocals on track 6
- Nella and Jon Campling – guest vocals on track 10
- John Stuart Dixon – guest guitar on track 11
- Kim Dylla – backing vocals
- Geoffroy Dell'Aria – bagpipes, tin whistle, low whistle
- Sinead Richards – euphonium
- John Fay – tin whistle
