= Redemption at the Puritan's Hand =

Studio album by Primordial
- Released: April 26, 2011
- Recorded: November–December 2010
- Studio: Foel Studio (Llanfair Caereinion, Wales)
- Genre: Pagan metal, black metal, folk metal
- Length: 63:56
- Label: Metal Blade
- Producer: Chris Fielding

Primordial chronology
To the Nameless Dead (2007)	Redemption at the Puritan's Hand (2011)	Where Greater Men Have Fallen (2014)

Professional ratings
Review scores
Source	Rating
About.com	4/5 stars
Allmusic	3.5/5 stars
Exclaim.ca	Favorable
Popmatters	9/10
Sputnik Music	3.5/5 stars
Metal Storm	9/10

Redemption at the Puritan's Hand is the seventh studio album by Irish extreme metal band Primordial, recorded at Foel Studio, Wales, with producer Chris Fielding and released on April 26, 2011. The album charted in Finland (#23), Germany (#31), Sweden (#54) and Switzerland (#90).

== Theme ==
When asked to describe the album, vocalist A.A. Nemtheanga remarked "this is the 'death' album. Plain and simple." Averill explained that, while Redemption At The Puritan's Hand is not a concept album, "many of the themes deal with mortality [and] how we deal with it. The spiritual structures we place around us to make sense of it. Sex, death, procreation and god. As we get older our relationship to our lives changes, the realization you will not live forever, the grand plan you hoped to uncover never materializes, food for worms and nothing more."

Averill used this theme to mount a critique of religious belief, and particularly the notion of spiritual redemption:

We all seek redemption in one way or another, from lies or from truth. Those of us who are godless or faithless often envy the man of faith for his life seems to have an extra purpose, despite the fact that logic, pragmatism, science and realism should crush any sign of faith, we still persist in lying to ourselves. Perhaps the alternative is too much to bear. So the themes of religion, mortality and death occur over and over again, along with continuing themes of alienation, martyrdom, sacrifice, violence and retribution.

== Track listing ==
All lyrics are written by A.A. Nemtheanga.

No.	Title	Music	Length
1.	"No Grave Deep Enough"	Ciáran MacUiliam	7:10
2.	"Lain with the Wolf"	MacUiliam	8:25
3.	"Bloodied Yet Unbowed"	Micheál O'Floinn	8:47
4.	"God's Old Snake"	MacUiliam	6:25
5.	"The Mouth of Judas"	MacUiliam	8:53
6.	"The Black Hundred"	MacUiliam	6:19
7.	"The Puritan's Hand"	Pól MacAmlaigh	8:36
8.	"Death of the Gods"	O'Floinn, MacUiliam	9:21
Total length:			63:56

== Personnel ==
- A.A. Nemtheanga – vocals
- Ciáran MacUiliam – guitars
- Michael Ó Floinn – guitars
- Pól MacAmlaigh – bass
- Simon Ó Laoghaire – drums
