= Blood for the Blood God =

Studio album by Cruachan
- Released: December 5, 2014
- Studio: Trackmix Studios, Dublin, Ireland
- Genre: Celtic metal, black metal, folk metal
- Length: 53:30
- Language: English, Irish
- Label: Trollzorn Records

Cruachan chronology
Blood on the Black Robe (2011)	Blood for the Blood God (2014)	Nine Years of Blood (2018)

Blood for the Blood God is the seventh studio album by Irish folk metal band Cruachan. It was released in 2014 on Trollzorn Records.

== Track listing ==
No.	Title	Length
1.	"Crom Cruach" (instrumental)	1:06
2.	"Blood for the Blood God"	5:49
3.	"The Arrival of the Fir Bolg"	6:27
4.	"Beren and Luthien"	5:47
5.	"The Marching Song of Fiach Mac Hugh"	3:22
6.	"Prophecy"	4:52
7.	"Gae Bolga" (instrumental)	4:04
8.	"The Sea Queen of Connaught"	7:26
9.	"Born for War (The Rise of Brian Boru)"	5:52
10.	"Perversion, Corruption and Sanctity, Pt. 1"	5:51
11.	"Perversion, Corruption and Sanctity, Pt. 2" (instrumental)	4:31
Total length:		53:30

"Bonus CD" bonus tracks
No.	Title	Length
12.	"Pagan"	4:22
13.	"Prophecy" (demo)	4:52
14.	"The Sea Queen of Connaught" (demo)	6:31
15.	"The Marching Song of Feach Mac Hugh" (demo)	3:30
16.	"I Am Warrior" (demo)	5:13
17.	"Pagan Hate" (demo)	5:13
18.	"Voyage of Bran" (demo)	4:18
Total length:		87:29

== Personnel ==
- Keith Fay - vocals, guitars, acoustic guitar, keyboards, piano, bouzouki, mandolin, bodhrán, percussion
- Kieran Ball - guitars, acoustic guitar
- Erin Fletcher - bass guitar
- Mauro Frison - drums, percussion
- John Ryan - violin, cello, bowed bass
- John Fay - tin whistle, low whistle, percussion, artwork

Additional personnel

- Barbara Allen - vocals
- Alex Shkuroparsky - Galician bagpipe
- Karen Gilligan - vocals on "The Voyage of Bran" (demo)
- Peter Rees - artwork
- Michael Richards - producer, recording
