= Middle Empire =

Middle Empire may refer to:

- Middle Empire, see names of China
- Middle Eastern empires have existed in the Middle East at various periods between 5000 BCE and 1924 CE
- Middle Assyrian Empire, a period in the history of Assyria after the fall of the Old Assyrian Empire in the 1300s BC

== See also ==
- Middle Kingdom (disambiguation)
- Middle power
- Middle-earth
- Central African Empire
- List of medieval great powers
