= Where Greater Men Have Fallen =

Studio album by Primordial
- Released: 25 November 2014
- Recorded: June 2014
- Studio: Grouse Lodge studios (Westmeath, Ireland)
- Genre: Pagan metal, black metal, folk metal
- Length: 58:45
- Label: Metal Blade Records
- Producer: Jaime Gomez Arellano

Primordial chronology
Redemption at the Puritan's Hand (2011)	Where Greater Men Have Fallen (2014)	Exile Amongst the Ruins (2018)

Where Greater Men Have Fallen is the eighth studio album by Irish extreme metal band Primordial. It was released on 25 November 2014, through Metal Blade Records. A music video for the track "Babel's Tower" was released on 24 November 2014.

The album reached #24 on the Top Heatseekers chart, #24 on Billboard's Top New Artist Chart and #43 on Billboard's Hard Music Chart, and #104 on Billboard's Independent Albums Chart.

== Track listing ==
All lyrics are written by A.A. Nemtheanga

No.	Title	Music	Length
1.	"Where Greater Men Have Fallen"	Micheál O'Floinn	8:06
2.	"Babel's Tower"	Ciáran MacUiliam	8:15
3.	"Come the Flood"	MacUiliam	7:16
4.	"The Seed of Tyrants"	MacUiliam	5:32
5.	"Ghosts of the Charnel House"	Pól MacAmlaigh	7:29
6.	"The Alchemist's Head"	MacUiliam	6:08
7.	"Born to Night"	MacUiliam	8:55
8.	"Wield Lightning to Split the Sun"	MacUiliam	7:04

== Critical reception ==
Professional ratings
Review scores
Source	Rating
About.com	4.5/5 stars
Metal Injection	Very positive
Pitchfork	7.9/10
Rolling Stone	3.5/5 stars

The album was generally well received by critics. Pitchfork wrote that "Compared to Primordial's past successes, the stripped-and-centered approach might seem simplistic, but the hour-long result is more immediate because of it. From beginning to end, Fallen feels like a compulsory listen." About.com's Dan Drago also praised the album, concluding in his review that Where Greater Men Have Fallen is "more proof of their ability to grow and maintain such a high level of songwriting. Equal in stature to their last two releases, they seem to be reaching new heights and very few bands can match their passion. They have once again released a sure candidate for album of the year."

Many critics were particularly complimentary towards A.A. Nemtheanga's vocals on the album. Writing for Rolling Stone, Kim Kelly wrote that "Alan Averill is a vocal powerhouse, soaring atop melodic black/folk metal compositions that channel doom and gloom as well as triumph. [...] When Averill howls "The heart of your motherland will be ripped from her chest," a million ghosts cry out with him."

== Personnel ==
Credits adapted from AllMusic.

=== Primordial ===
- A.A. Nemtheanga – vocals, lyrics
- Ciáran MacUiliam – guitars
- Michael O'Floinn – guitars
- Pól MacAmlaigh – bass
- Simon O'Laoghaire – drums

=== Production and art ===
- Jaime Gomez Arellano – producer, engineer
- Costin Chioreanu – artwork, layout
- Jesko Mägle – photography
- Marco Manzi – photography
- John Gallardo – photography
- Miluta Flueras – back cover photo, cover photo

== Charts ==
Chart (2014)	Peak position
Finnish Albums (Suomen virallinen lista)	45
German Albums (Offizielle Top 100)	34
Swiss Albums (Schweizer Hitparade)	97
US Heatseekers Albums (Billboard)	24
