= The Middle Kingdom (album) =

Studio album by Cruachan
- Released: 1 June 2000
- Recorded: November 1999
- Genre: Celtic metal
- Length: 44:38
- Language: English, Irish
- Label: Hammerheart
- Producer: Dennis Buckley

Cruachan chronology
Tuatha na Gael (1995)	The Middle Kingdom (2000)	Folk-Lore (2002)

The Middle Kingdom is the second studio album by Irish folk metal band Cruachan released in 2000 on Hammerheart Records. According to Ryan Dyer of MetalSucks, the album saw the band take a more traditional approach.

== Track listing ==
No.	Title	Length
1.	"A Celtic Mourning" (instrumental)	4:01
2.	"Celtica (Voice of the Morrigan)"	5:38
3.	"The Fianna"	4:53
4.	"A Druid's Passing"	3:22
5.	"Is Fuair an Chroí"	4:51
6.	"Cattle Raid of Cooley (Táin Bó Cuailnge)"	4:46
7.	"The Middle Kingdom"	4:38
8.	"Óró sé do bheatha abhaile" (traditional)	4:17
9.	"Unstabled (Steeds of Macha)"	4:26
10.	"The Butterfly"	3:46
11.	"To Hell or to Connaught" (limited edition bonus track)	3:52
Total length:		48:30

== Personnel ==
- Keith Fay – vocals, guitars, mandolin, bodhrán, bones
- Karen Gilligan – vocals, percussion
- Joe Farrell – drums, percussion
- John O'Fathaigh – Irish flute, tin whistle, low whistle, recorder, uilleann pipes, artwork
- John Clohessy – bass, vocals (backing)

=== Additional personnel ===
- Andy Kelligan – Great Highland bagpipe
- John Munnelly – vocals on "Is Fuair an Chroí" and "To Hell or to Connaught"
- Marco Jeurissen – layout
- Dennis Buckley – engineering, producer
