= Spirit the Earth Aflame =

Studio album by Primordial
- Released: 22 May 2000
- Recorded: January 2000
- Studio: Sun Studios (Dublin)
- Genre: Pagan metal, black metal, folk metal
- Length: 51:04
- Label: Hammerheart

Primordial chronology
The Burning Season (1999)	Spirit the Earth Aflame (2000)	Storm Before Calm (2002)

Spirit the Earth Aflame is the third studio album by Irish extreme metal band Primordial. It was originally released in 2000.

Professional ratings
Review scores
Source	Rating
Allmusic	4/5 stars
Metal Reviews	9.3/10 stars
Metal Underground	4.5/5 stars
Metal Crypt	5/5 stars

== Track listing ==
All tracks are written by Primordial.

No.	Title	Length
1.	"Spirit the Earth Aflame"	2:23
2.	"Gods to the Godless"	7:47
3.	"The Soul Must Sleep"	6:37
4.	"The Burning Season"	8:42
5.	"Glorious Dawn"	7:22
6.	"The Cruel Sea"	4:03
7.	"Children of the Harvest"	8:29
Total length:		45:23

Bonus hidden live track
No.	Title	Length
8.	"To Enter Pagan"	5:41
Total length:		51:04

== Credits ==
- Alan Averill – vocals
- Ciáran MacUiliam – guitar
- Feargal Flannery – guitar
- Pól "Paul" MacAmlaigh – bass
- Simon O'Laoghaire – drums
