= Blood on the Black Robe =

Studio album by Cruachan
- Released: 18 April 2011
- Recorded: 2011
- Studio: Trackmix Studios, Dublin, Ireland
- Genre: Celtic metal, black metal
- Length: 58:01
- Label: Candlelight
- Producer: Michael Richards

Cruachan chronology
| The Morrigan's Call (2006) | Blood on the Black Robe (2011) | Blood for the Blood God (2014) |

Blood on the Black Robe is the sixth studio album by Irish folk metal band Cruachan. It was released in 2011 on Candlelight Records.

== Track listing ==
| No. | Title | Length |
|---|---|---|
| 1. | "To War" (instrumental) | 0:55 |
| 2. | "I Am Warrior" | 5:19 |
| 3. | "The Column" | 7:12 |
| 4. | "Thy Kingdom Gone" | 4:26 |
| 5. | "An Bean Sidhe" | 5:50 |
| 6. | "Blood on the Black Robe" | 6:39 |
| 7. | "Primeval Odium" | 7:18 |
| 8. | "The Voyage of Bran" | 4:20 |
| 9. | "Brian Boru's March" (instrumental) | 3:29 |
| 10. | "Pagan Hate" | 5:12 |
| 11. | "The Nine Year War" | 7:21 |
| Total length: | | 58:01 |

== Personnel ==
- Keith Fay – vocals, guitars, keyboards, bouzouki, mandolin, bodhrán, percussion
- John Clohessy – bass guitar
- Colin Purcell – drums, percussion
- John Ryan – violin, mandocello, bouzouki
- John Fay – tin whistle, low whistle, percussion, cover art

Additional personnel

- Alex Shkuroparsky – Galician bagpipe
- Karen Gilligan – vocals on "An Bean Sidhe" and "The Voyage of Bran"
- Peter Rees – artwork
- Michael Richards – producer, recording
