= The Burning Season (EP) =

EP by Primordial
- Released: 4 October 1999
- Recorded: March 1999
- Studio: Sun Studios (Dublin)
- Genre: Pagan metal, black metal, folk metal
- Length: 30:48
- Label: Hammerheart

Primordial chronology
A Journey's End (1998)	The Burning Season (1999)	Spirit the Earth Aflame (2000)

The Burning Season is the first EP by Irish extreme metal band Primordial, released in 1999. The title track would be featured on their follow-up full-length Spirit the Earth Aflame as well.

== Track listing ==
All tracks are written by Primordial.

No.	Title	Length
1.	"The Calling"	4:54
2.	"Among the Lazarae"	7:53
3.	"The Burning Season"	8:45
4.	"...And the Sun Set on Life Forever"	9:17
Total length:		30:48

== Credits ==
- A.A. Nemtheanga – vocals
- Ciáran MacUiliam – guitars
- Pól MacAmlaigh – bass
- Simon O'Laoghaire – drums
