= Baarhus =

Swedish band

Background information
- Origin: Sundsvall, Sweden
- Genres: Gothic Rock, Darkwave
- Years active: 2024–present
- Label: Hammerheart Records
- Members: Jimmy Storsleth; Mats Söderberg; Malin Jönsson
- Website: baarhus.com

Baarhus (English: Mortuary or Morgue) is a Gothic rock/Dark wave band from Sundsvall, Sweden, formed in 2024. The band consists of three members: Jimmy Storsleth (vocals, acoustic guitar, synthesizer), Malin Jönsson (piano, synthesizer, programming and Mats Söderberg (electric guitar, bass guitar, programming).

The music moves between guitar-driven intensity and cinematic, orchestral arrangements, shaped by baritone vocals and a strong sense of atmosphere.

Since their debut in 2024, they have released six singles on streaming services, a physical EP on CD and an album Songs Under a Darkened Sky which was released on limited vinyl, CD and streaming services. The physical releases also include the bonus track Stigmata Martyr, a cover of Bauhaus' classic goth anthem. Baarhus has received positive mentions and reviews in blogs and music magazines around the world such as Sweden Rock Magazine, Hymn, Rocknytt, The Moshville Times, Medienkonverter, Sound & Vision, Goth News, Luminous Dash and many more. According to reports, it was through Sweden Rock Magazine that the record label Hammerheart Records first heard the band and then offered them a contract. The label will reissue Songs Under a Darkened Sky in 2027.

== Discography ==
=== LPs ===
- Songs Under a Darkened Sky 2026. Limited edition. Includes a bonus track

=== CDs ===
- Baarhus (EP) 2025
- Songs Under a Darkened Sky (Album) 2026. Limited edition. Includes a bonus track

=== Digital ===
- "The Buzzard" (Single) 2024
- "Humanity Termination" (Single) 2024
- "The Sirens Yell" (Single) 2025
- "When You Lied" (Single) 2025
- "Late Is The Hour" (Single) 2025
- "City Of Fear" (Single) 2026
- Songs Under A Darkened Sky (Album) 2026. No bonus track.
