= How It Ends =

How It Ends may refer to:

- How It Ends (DeVotchKa album), 2004, or the title track
- How It Ends (Primordial album), 2023
- How It Ends (2018 film), an action film
- How It Ends (2021 film), a drama film
- "How It Ends", a song by Finneas from his 2021 album Optimist
- "How It Ends", a song by Oliver Tree from his 2026 album Love You Madly Hate You Badly
