= The Burning Season =

The Burning Season may refer to:

- The Burning Season (1993 film), a 1993 film directed by Harvey Crossland
- The Burning Season (1994 film), a 1994 television movie directed by John Frankenheimer
- The Burning Season (2008 film), a documentary about the burning of rainforests in Indonesia
- The Burning Season (2023 film), a drama film directed by Sean Garrity
- The Burning Season (album), by Faith and the Muse
- The Burning Season (EP), a 1999 EP by Primordial
