= Once Upon an Era =

Demo album by Waylander
- Released: 1995
- Genre: Celtic metal, folk metal
- Length: 24:06
- Label: Self-released

Waylander chronology
Once Upon an Era (1995)	Dawning of a New Age (1996)

Once Upon an Era is the first demo album by the Northern Irish Celtic metal band Waylander, recorded at Hillcrest Studios Lurgan, County Armagh. It was released in 1995. It is notable for being the only Waylander recording to feature original bassist Jason Barriskill.

== Track listing ==
No.	Title	Length
1.	"Born to the Fight"	03:52
2.	"Ashes to Ashes"	04:21
3.	"This Can Not Be"	05:14
4.	"Once Upon an Era"	06:08
5.	"Blood Lust"	04:31
Total length:		24:06

== Band line-up ==
- Ciaran O'Hagan - vocals
- Dermot O'Hagan - guitars
- Jason Barriskill - bass
- Den Ferran - drums
