= Sammath =

Dutch black metal band

Sammath is a Dutch black metal band. They have released seven studio albums.

The band signed with Hammerheart Records in 2013.

== Discography ==
- Strijd (1999)
- Verwoesting/Devastation (2002)
- Dodengang (2006)
- Triumph in Hatred (2009)
- Godless Arrogance (2014)
- Live Arrogance (live album, 2018)
- Across the Rhine Is Only Death (2019)
- Grebbeberg (2023)
