= Kindred Spirits (Waylander album) =

Studio album by Waylander
- Released: July 16, 2012
- Genre: Celtic metal, folk metal, black metal
- Length: 53:48
- Label: Listenable
- Producer: Dave Briggs

Waylander chronology
Honour Amongst Chaos (2008)	Kindred Spirits (2012)

Professional ratings
Review scores
Source	Rating
AllMusic	2.5/5
Metal.de	7/10
Rock Hard	6/10

Kindred Spirits is the fourth studio album by the Northern Irish Celtic metal band Waylander. It was released in 2012 on Listenable Records.

== Track listing ==
No.	Title	Length
1.	"Echoes of the Sidhe"	6:09
2.	"Lámh Dearg"	7:00
3.	"Twin Fires of Beltíne"	5:49
4.	"Of Fear and Fury"	6:48
5.	"Grave of Giants"	2:14
6.	"A Path Well Trodden"	6:07
7.	"Quest for Immortality"	5:38
8.	"Erdath"	7:26
9.	"Kindred Spirits"	6:37
Total length:		53:48

== Personnel ==
- Ard Chieftain O'Hagan - vocals
- Tor Dennison - guitars
- Michael Procter - bass, backing vocals
- Den Ferran - drums
- Saul McMichael - guitars
- Dave Briggs - whistles, Irish bouzouki, mandolin, bodhrán, backing vocals

== Additional personnel ==
- Mika Jussila - mastering
- Matt Vickerstaff - design, layout
