= Hyubris =

Portuguese folk and heavy metal band

- Origin: Tramagal, Portugal
- Genres: Folk Metal, Celtic Metal, Heavy Metal
- Years active: 2001–present
- Members: Filipa Mota - Vocals/Flute; Jorge Cardoso - Guitar; Panda - Bass/Portuguese guitar João David - Keyboards; Lulla - Drums

Hyubris is a Portuguese folk and heavy metal band, with Celtic roots from Tramagal, Portugal. Initially called "Lupakajojo", after the first letters of Lulla, Panda, Kaiser, Jorge and João. The name ‘Hyubris’ derives from the Greek word ’Hybris’, which means ’Challenge to the Gods’.

The band was renamed to Hyubris, in 2001, when Filipa Mota joined in for the vocals, and where they started to play continuously, without any hiatus. Before the end of 2002, Hyubris recorded their demo CD called Desafio (which means ’Challenge’). Desafio presenting four songs of the many they had written that far. In 2005 they released their self-titled album Hyubris. All of the 12 songs were recorded in Porto, Portugal in the studio ‘Rec’ N’ Roll’, and mastered by Tommy Newton at ‘Area 51 Recording Studios’ in Germany. In 2009, the album Forja was released.

== Discography ==
- Desafio (2001)
- Hyubris (2005)
- Forja (2009)
- Tormentos (2025)
