= Waylander (band) =

Northern Irish folk metal band

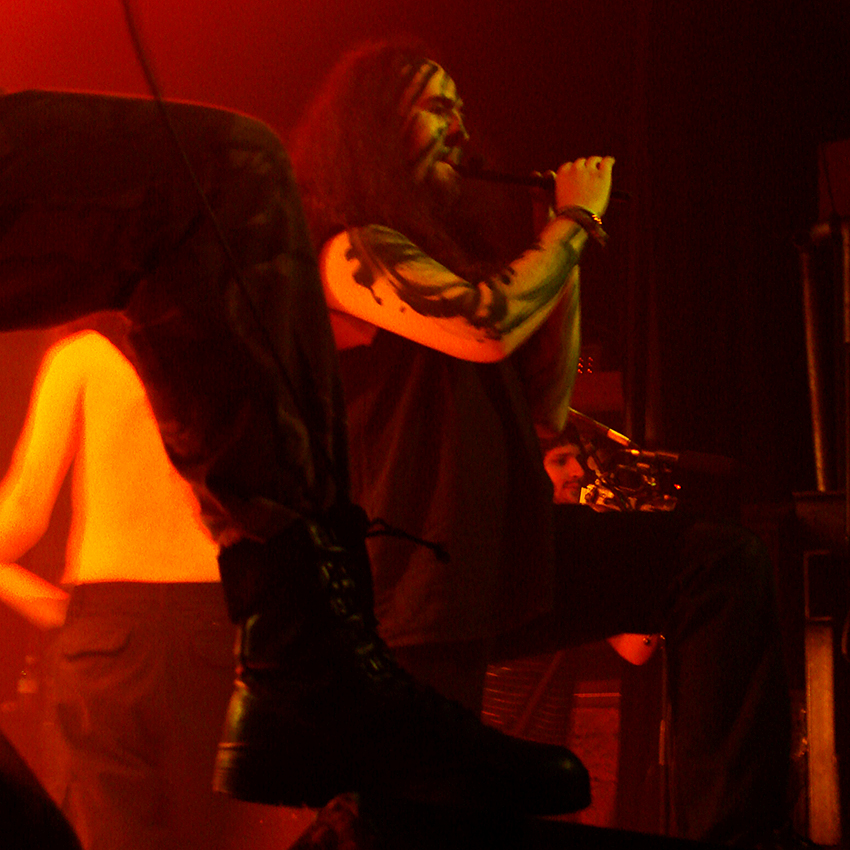
- Waylander at Cernunnos Pagan Fest

Background information
- Origin: Armagh, Northern Ireland
- Genres: Folk metal Black metal Celtic metal
- Years active: 1993–present
- Label: Listenable
- Members: Ciaran O'Hagan; Saul McMichael; Tor Dennison; Steve Reynolds; Lee McCartney; Dave Briggs
- Past members: Jason Barriskill; Nick Shannon; Bo Murphy; Mairtin McCormaic; Fearghal Duffy; Peter Boylan; Owen Boden; Dermot O'Hagan; Kevin Canavan; Gareth Murdock; Ade Mulgrew; Michael Proctor

Waylander are an Irish folk metal band influential in the realms of Celtic metal. Formed in 1993, the band blends traditional Irish folk with 1990s heavy metal.

== History ==
Formed in 1993, Waylander released their debut demo, Once Upon an Era, in early 1995, mixing Irish folk music with extreme metal. Waylander were soon dubbed folk, Celtic and pagan metal. In 1996, with the addition of a full-time tin whistle player, Waylander released their second demo, Dawning of a New Age, which soon gained the band a prominent position in the folk metal scene. This was cemented when Waylander signed to Century Media Records, and in 1998 their debut album was released, entitled Reawakening Pride Once Lost. A handful of gigs were undertaken to promote this album but label problems and internal strife blunted the potential somewhat. After overcoming some line-up changes, Waylander signed with Blackend Records and released their The Light, the Dark and the Endless Knot album in early 2001. Again internal strife reared up, culminating in numerous line-up changes for several years. Despite this Waylander managed to perform some notable gigs, including the Bloodstock and Day of Darkness festivals, as well as gigs with Ancient Rites, Cathedral, Sabbat and Skyforger. In 2005, joining original members ArdChieftain O' Hagan, Michael Proctor, and Den Ferran were Saul McMichael and Gareth Murdock on guitars.

Waylander have signed a deal with Listenable Records and Waylander's new third album, entitled Honour Amongst Chaos, is "more powerful and beautiful than ever, using a vast array of Irish folk instruments and armed with their passion for metal in its truest form", according to a press release. "Blending epic atmospheres and relentless brutality, Honour Amongst Chaos reflects the heart and soul of pagan warriors worldwide." Waylander's debut album, Reawakening Pride Once Lost, has been re-released by Midhir Records on CD and vinyl.

In 2009, Gareth Murdock left the band to be the new bassist for Alestorm.

== Discography ==
=== Studio albums ===
- Reawakening Pride Once Lost (1998)
- The Light, the Dark and the Endless Knot (2001)
- Honour Amongst Chaos (2008)
- Kindred Spirits (2012)
- Ériú's Wheel (2019)
- Mac Tíre: Son of the Land (2026)

=== Demo albums ===
- Once Upon an Era (1994)
- Dawning of a New Age (1996)

== Members ==
=== Current members ===
- Ciaran O'Hagan – vocals (1993–present)
- Saul McMichael – guitars (2004–present)
- Dave Briggs – tin whistle, Irish bouzouki, mandolin, bodhrán (2006–present)
- Tor Dennison – guitars (2011–present)
- Lee McCartney – drums (2013–present)
- Connor Murray – bass (2022–present)

=== Former members ===
- Den Ferren – drums (1993–2000, 2003–2013)
- Jason Barriskill – bass (1993–1995) (died 2010)
- Baylers – guitars (1993)
- Peter Boylan – guitars (1993, 1999–2001)
- Dermot O'Hagan – guitars (1993–2003)
- Michael Proctor – bass (1995–2018)
- Máirtín Mac Cormaic – tin whistle, bodhrán (1996–2002)
- Bo Murphy – drums (2000–2001)
- Owen Bowden – guitars (2001–2003)
- Nick Shannon – drums (2001–2003)
- Kevin Canavan – guitars (2003)
- Fearghal Duffy – guitars (2003–2004)
- Alan Connolly – guitars (2005)
- Gareth Murdock – guitars (2005–2008, 2008–2009)
- Ade Mulgrew – guitars (2008)
- Hugh O'Neill – guitars (2009–2011)
- Steve Reynolds – bass (2018–2019, 2021–2022)

Timeline
