= Nine Years of Blood =

Studio album by Cruachan
- Released: April 27, 2018
- Studio: Trackmix Studios, Dublin, Ireland
- Genre: Celtic metal, black metal, folk metal
- Length: 48:26
- Language: English, Irish
- Label: Trollzorn Records

Cruachan chronology
Blood for the Blood God (2014)	Nine Years of Blood (2018)	The Living and the Dead (2023)

Nine Years of Blood is the eighth studio album by Irish folk metal band Cruachan. It was released in 2018 on Trollzorn Records.

== Track listing ==
No.	Title	Length
1.	"I Am Tuan" (instrumental)	2:37
2.	"Hugh O'Neil - The Earl of Tyrone"	4:37
3.	"Blood and Victory"	4:43
4.	"Queen of War"	6:16
5.	"The Battle of the Yellow Ford"	4:50
6.	"Cath na Brioscaí"	5:47
7.	"The Harp, the Lion, the Dragon and the Sword"	5:28
8.	"An Ale Before Battle" (instrumental)	0:28
9.	"Nine Years of Blood" (instrumental)	1:35
10.	"The Siege of Kinsale"	5:01
11.	"The Flight of the Earls"	4:06
12.	"Back Home in Derry" (Christy Moore cover)	2:58
Total length:		48:26

== Personnel ==
- Keith Fay - vocals, guitars, acoustic guitar, keyboards, tin whistle, bouzouki, mandolin, bodhrán, percussion
- Kieran Ball - guitars, acoustic guitar
- Erin Fletcher - bass guitar
- Mauro Frison - drums, percussion
- John Ryan - violin, cello, bowed bass

Additional personnel

- Daniel Durbeck - artwork, design and layout
- Michael Richards - producer, recording
