= A Journey's End =

Studio album by Primordial
- Released: 15 June 1998
- Recorded: February 1998
- Studio: Academy Studio (Dewsbury, West Yorkshire)
- Genre: Pagan metal, black metal, folk metal
- Length: 47:16; 56:33 (2005 reissue)
- Label: Misanthropy

Primordial chronology
Imrama (1995)	A Journey's End (1998)	The Burning Season (1999)

A Journey's End is the second studio album by Irish extreme metal band Primordial. It was originally released in 1998.

It was first re-released in 2005 by Candlelight Records with Imrama as a two-disc set. Metal Blade Records re-released the album on 1 September 2009 in Europe (29 August in Germany, Switzerland and Austria) with updated graphics and liner notes.

== Track listing ==
All tracks are written by Primordial.

No.	Title	Length
1.	"Graven Idol"	8:05
2.	"Dark Song"	5:04
3.	"Autumn's Ablaze"	8:16
4.	"Journey's End"	8:00
5.	"Solitary Mourner"	2:53
6.	"Bitter Harvest"	10:33
7.	"On Aistear Deirneach"	4:25
Total length:		47:16

2005 reissue bonus track
No.	Title	Length
8.	"And the Sun Set on Life Forever"	9:17
Total length:		56:33

Note: On the 2005 reissue, track 7 is listed as "An Aistear Deirneach".

Bonus CD – Live at the Ritz, Lisbon, Portugal, 9 December 1999

1. "Infernal Summer"
2. "The Calling"
3. "Journey's End"
4. "Children of the Harvest"
5. "The Burning Season"
6. "The Purging Fire (Gods to the Godless)"
7. "Autumns Ablaze"
8. "Let the Sun Set on Life Forever"
9. "Graven Idol"
10. "To Enter Pagan"

== Personnel ==
- Alan Averill – vocals
- Ciáran MacUiliam – guitar, mandolin, whistles
- Pól "Paul" MacAmlaigh – bass
- Simon Ó Laoghaire – drums, bodhrán
