= To the Nameless Dead =

Studio album by Primordial
- Released: 27 November 2007
- Recorded: July–August 2007
- Studio: Foel Studio (Llanfair Caereinion, Wales)
- Genre: Pagan metal, black metal, folk metal
- Length: 54:49
- Label: Metal Blade
- Producer: Chris Fielding

Primordial chronology
| The Gathering Wilderness (2005) | To the Nameless Dead (2007) | Redemption at the Puritan's Hand (2011) |

Professional ratings
Review scores
| Source | Rating |
|---|---|
| About.com | 4.5/5 stars |
| AllMusic | 4/5 stars |
| Sputnik Music | 4.5/5 stars |
| Chronicles of Chaos | 5/5 stars |

To the Nameless Dead is the sixth studio album by Irish extreme metal band Primordial, released in 2007. It is also available in a limited edition as a digibook, featuring a different cover design, a 40-page booklet, and a bonus DVD. The album was recorded at Foel Studio, Wales, with producer Chris Fielding. It was recorded using all analog equipment and using mostly first or second takes for the final recording, making for a more raw and spontaneous sound.

To the Nameless Dead received overwhelming praise, rising to such accolades as being named 2008's Metal Album of the Year by Chronicles of Chaos (continuing an unprecedented back-to-back honouring for Primordial by the webzine).

== Track listing ==
All lyrics are written by A.A. Nemtheanga.

| No. | Title | Music | Length |
|---|---|---|---|
| 1. | "Empire Falls" | Ciáran MacUiliam | 8:12 |
| 2. | "Gallows Hymn" | Micheál O'Floinn | 5:54 |
| 3. | "As Rome Burns" | MacUiliam, Pól MacAmlaigh | 9:16 |
| 4. | "Failures Burden" | O'Floinn | 6:38 |
| 5. | "Heathen Tribes" | MacUiliam | 8:18 |
| 6. | "The Rising Tide" (instrumental) | Primordial | 1:32 |
| 7. | "Traitors Gate" | MacUiliam | 6:48 |
| 8. | "No Nation on This Earth" | MacAmlaigh, MacUiliam | 8:11 |
| Total length: | | | 54:49 |

Bonus DVD tracks (recorded at the 2006 Rock Hard Festival)
| No. | Title | Length |
|---|---|---|
| 1. | "The Golden Spiral" |
| 2. | "The Gathering Wilderness" |
| 3. | "Sons of the Morrigan" |
| 4. | "The Coffin Ships" |
| 5. | "Song of the Tomb" |
| 6. | "Gods to the Godless" |

== Credits ==
- A.A. Nemtheanga – vocals, mastering, mixing
- Ciáran MacUiliam – guitars
- Michael O'Floinn – guitars
- Pól MacAmlaigh – bass
- Simon O'Laoghaire – drums
