= Middle Kingdom =

Middle Kingdom may refer to:

== Nation ==
- The Middle Kingdom, a name for China, from the translation of its native Chinese name, Zhongguo
- Madhyadesha (Middle country), a sub-division of ancient India
- Middle Kingdom of Egypt, designation of The Period of Reunification (c. 2000 – c. 1700 BC)
- Middle kingdoms of India, political entities from the 3rd century BC to the 1200s
- The Hittite Middle Kingdom, a transitional period in the 15th century BC with few surviving records
- Pushyabhuti dynasty, under Harsha referred to itself as Madhyadesha (Middle country)

== Other ==
- A former attraction of Ocean Park Hong Kong
- A region of the Society for Creative Anachronism, consisting several states in the Midwestern U.S.
- The Middle Kingdom (album), of 2000 by Celtic metal band Cruachan
- The Middle Kingdoms series of novels by Diane Duane
