= Reawakening Pride Once Lost =

Studio album by Waylander
- Released: 1998
- Genre: Celtic metal, black metal
- Length: 48:08
- Label: Century Media
- Producer: Andy Classen

Waylander chronology
Reawakening Pride Once Lost (1998)	The Light, the Dark and the Endless Knot (2001)

Professional ratings
Review scores
Source	Rating
Metal.de	5/10
Rock Hard	8/10

Reawakening Pride Once Lost is the debut studio album by the Northern Irish Celtic metal band Waylander, released in 1998 by Century Media. The album was re-released in 2006 by the Irish label, Midhir Records. This pressing came with two bonus tracks - A Hero's Lament and Sunrise - both taken from the Dawning of a New Age demo.

It was rated a seven out of ten by Chronicles of Chaos.

== Track listing ==
No.	Title	Length
1.	"Sunrise"	2:28
2.	"Born to the Fight"	3:02
3.	"With Veins Afire"	4:42
4.	"Emain Macha"	5:56
5.	"Gaelic Dawn"	2:27
6.	"Once Upon an Era"	3:49
7.	"A Hero's Lament"	6:11
8.	"King of the Fairies"	6:08
9.	"Keen of Knowledge"	4:07
10.	"Victory Feast"	2:55
11.	"Awakening"	6:23
Total length:		48:08

2006 reissue bonus tracks
No.	Title	Length
12.	"A Hero's Lament" (demo version)	7:29
13.	"Sunrise" (demo version)	3:24
Total length:		59:01

== Band line-up ==
- Ciaran O'Hagan - vocals
- Dermot O'Hagan - guitars, backing vocals
- Michael Proctor - bass
- Den Ferran - drums, percussion, bodhrán, tambourine
- Mairtin Mac Cormaic - tin whistle, bodhrán, backing vocals
