= The Gathering Wilderness =

Studio album by Primordial
- Released: February 7, 2005 (Europe); February 22, 2005 (US)
- Recorded: October 2004
- Studio: Cauldron Studios (Dublin)
- Genre: Pagan metal, black metal, folk metal
- Length: 59:30
- Label: Metal Blade

Primordial chronology
Storm Before Calm (2002)	The Gathering Wilderness (2005)	To the Nameless Dead (2007)

Professional ratings
Review scores
Source	Rating
AllMusic	4.5/5 stars

The Gathering Wilderness is the fifth studio album by Irish extreme metal band Primordial, released in 2005. It was their debut for the Metal Blade label. The digipak comes with a bonus DVD featuring a documentary detailing the making of the album. The album is in part dedicated to Quorthon, who had died the year prior.

== Track listing ==
All lyrics are written by A.A. Nemtheanga.

No.	Title	Music	Length
1.	"The Golden Spiral"	MacUiliam	8:03
2.	"The Gathering Wilderness"	MacAmlaigh	9:13
3.	"The Song of the Tomb"	MacUiliam	7:56
4.	"End of All Times (Martyrs Fire)"	O'Floinn, MacUiliam	7:42
5.	"The Coffin Ships"	MacUiliam	9:58
6.	"Tragedy's Birth"	O'Floinn, MacUiliam	8:31
7.	"Cities Carved in Stone"	MacUiliam	8:07
Total length:			59:30

== Credits ==
- A.A. Nemtheanga – vocals
- Ciáran MacUiliam – guitars
- Michael O'Floinn – guitars
- Pól MacAmlaigh – bass
- Simon Ó Laoghaire – drums
