= Revenge (Canadian band) =

Canadian extreme metal band

- Origin: Edmonton, Alberta, Canada
- Genre: War metal
- Years active: 2000–present
- Labels: Dark Horizon, Osmose, War Hammer, Nuclear War Now!, Season of Mist
- Members: James Read; Vermin; Hassiophis
- Past members: Pete Helmkamp; Attacker; Dehumanizer

Revenge is a Canadian war metal band formed in 2000 by James Read, following the collapse of his previous group, Conqueror. Revenge's black metal continues Read's previous band's direction. The band has rejected the term "war metal", instead calling themselves black metal or black death metal. They have released seven full-length albums. The band's lyrics explore anti-religion, misanthropy, self-ascension, and the collapse and rebuilding of mankind.

== History ==
Following the breakup of Canadian war metal band Conqueror, James Read formed Revenge in 2000 in Edmonton, Alberta, with Ryan Förster (of Conqueror, Blasphemy, and Domini Inferi) and Vermin (of Sacramentary Abolishment and Axis of Advance). Using session musicians Attacker and Dehumanizer, the band recorded the Attack.Blood.Revenge 10-inch EP, which featured a cover of Bathory's "War". Dark Horizon Records released the EP in 2001. That year, Read joined French band Arkhon Infaustus for European touring and played session drums for Axis of Advance.

In June 2002, Pete Helmkamp of Order from Chaos and Angelcorpse joined Revenge on bass and backing vocals. The band signed to French label Osmose, who released Revenge's first full-length album, Triumph.Genocide.Antichrist, in 2003. Revenge contributed the track "Deathless Will" to a split 7-inch single with Arkhon Infaustus, also through Osmose. Osmose released two further albums in 2004 and 2008, similar to previous Revenge and Conqueror releases. In 2011, Helmkamp left the band and was replaced with session member Haasiophis (Timothy Grieco, who plays in "Antediluvian" and "Black Death Cult").

In January 2015, Revenge played with Mayhem and Watain on the "Black Metal Warfare" tour in the United States.

== Band members ==
=== Current ===
- James Read (drums, studio vocals 2000–present)
- Vermin (studio guitars and bass, live vocals 2002–present)
- Haasiophis (live vocals and bass 2011–present)

=== Former ===
- Pete Helmkamp (bass, live vocals 2002–2011)
- Attacker (session bass 2001–2002)
- Dehumanizer (session guitar 2001–2002)

R. Förster (Conqueror) is credited as a songwriter on a few Revenge songs that were created from unused Conqueror material, but he was never a member of Revenge nor played in any records.

== Discography ==
=== Studio albums ===
- Triumph.Genocide.Antichrist (Osmose, 2003)
- Victory.Intolerance.Mastery (Osmose, 2004)
- Infiltration.Downfall.Death (Osmose, 2008)
- Scum.Collapse.Eradication (Nuclear War Now!, OSMOSE 2012)
- Behold.Total.Rejection (Season of Mist, 2015)
- Strike.Smother.Dehumanize (Season of Mist, 2020)
- Violation.Strife.Abominate (Season of Mist, 2025)

=== EPs ===
- Attack.Blood.Revenge (Dark Horizon, 2001)
- Superion.Command.Destroy (War Hammer, 2002)
- Split 7-inch with Arkhon Infaustus (Osmose, 2003)
- Retaliation.Doom.Eradication (Nuclear War Now!, 2012)
- Split 7-inch with Black Witchery (Nuclear War Now!, 2015)
- Deceiver.Diseased.Miasmic (Season of Mist, 2018)
