= Cailean Stone =

Scottish broadcaster and musician

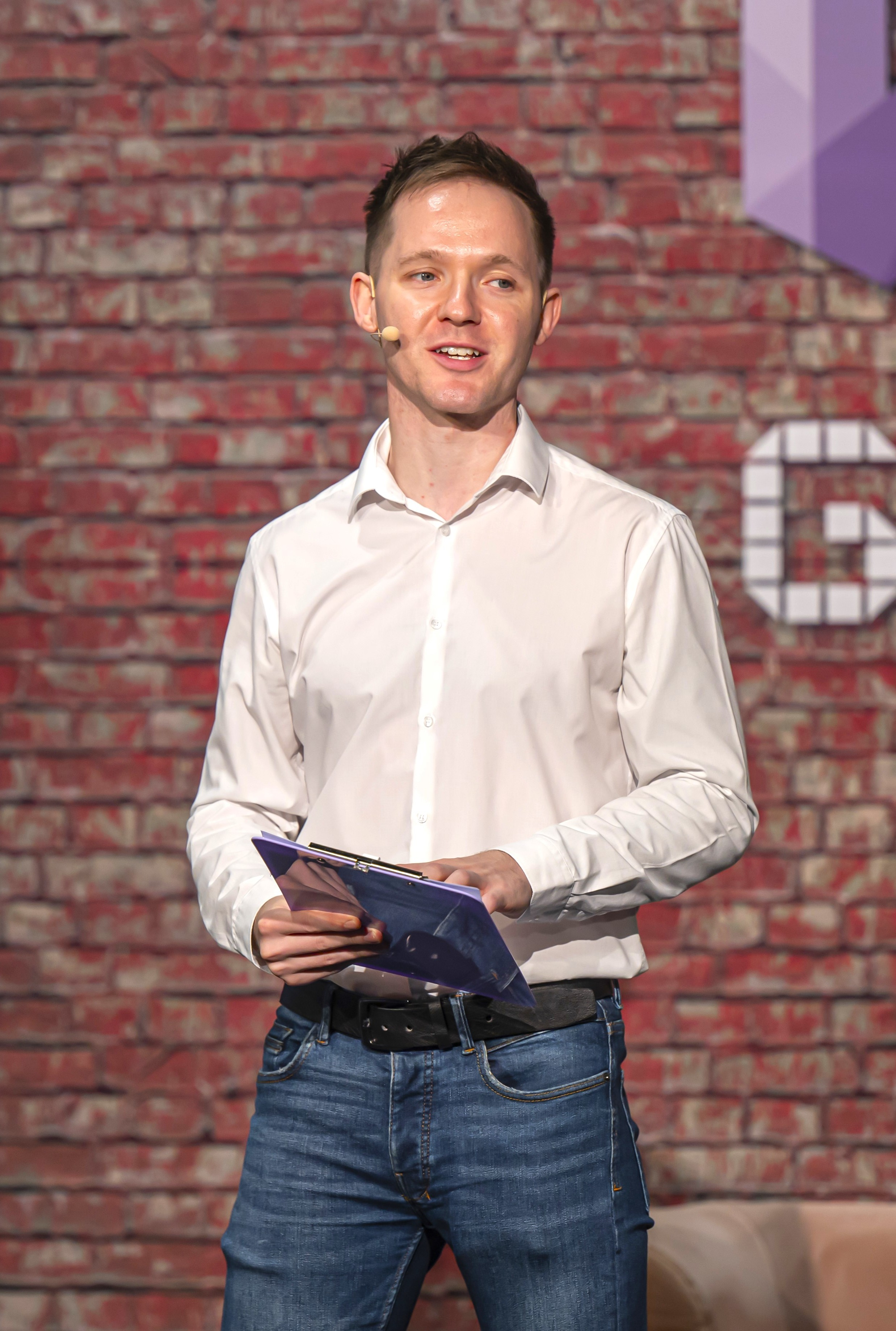
- Stone in 2023
- Born: Edinburgh, Scotland
- Education: Glasgow Caledonian University
- Occupations: Broadcaster, musician
- Years active: 2013–present
- Employer(s): STV (2014–2017); Radio Clyde (2017–2019)
- Website: colin-stone.com

Cailean Stone or Colin Stone is a Scottish broadcaster and musician best known for his work in Scottish Gaelic metalcore band Gun Ghaol.

== Biography ==
Stone grew up in Castletown and attended Thurso High School.

He studied multimedia journalism at Glasgow Caledonian University, graduating from a class which included Amy Irons, Aoife Moore, and Sky Sports News producer Sahil Jaidka. In 2011, Stone won an NCTJ award for his shorthand accuracy. In 2013, he became the manager of the university's student radio station Radio Caley and began working for YOUR Radio in Dumbarton.

Stone joined STV Glasgow in 2014 as the channel's roving reporter on flagship programme The Riverside Show.

In January 2016, Stone moved to STV News as a reporter and news anchor.

Stone joined Radio Clyde as Senior Reporter in 2017. He later started the Week In The Weeg podcast with colleague Natalie Crawford.

In 2020, Stone began leading media training courses for Pink Elephant Communications. In 2024, a Freedom of Information request found Stone had led a series of training sessions with Scottish Greens co-leader Lorna Slater.

== Gun Ghaol ==
Stone founded Gun Ghaol, the world's first Scottish Gaelic metalcore band, in 2023 after posting a Celtic metal-inspired TikTok that went viral.

The band's debut album Leum, which came out in October 2024, was streamed in more than 50 countries in the first week. It features a cover of Òran na Cloiche, which celebrates the return of the Stone of Destiny to Scotland.

Stone credits his Gaelic-speaking mother for sparking his interest in starting the project.

In May 2026, the band released the "first Gaelic World Cup song" ahead of Scotland's return to the tournament.

== Discography ==
=== Studio albums ===
- Leum - 2024
- Eadar Bàs is Bruadaran - 2027

=== Singles ===
- "Suidh Sìos" - 2025
- "Marbhtach" - 2024
- "Bha Thu Ceàrr" - 2023

== Personal life ==
Colin is the younger brother of comedian ML Stone, who played the role of Maggie LaBeau on BBC Scotland comedy series Scot Squad. He is the son of Royal National Mod Gold medalist Christine Stone and Free Church of Scotland minister Howard Stone.
