= Geasa (band) =

Irish Celtic metal band

- Origin: Dublin, Ireland
- Genres: Celtic metal, black metal
- Years active: 1994–present
- Labels: Season of Mist, DMP Productions
- Members: Draighean – Vocals, Bass, Keyboards; Philip White – Guitar, Keyboards; Cory Sloan – Guitar; Simon Ó Laoghaire – Drums
- Past members: Brian O'Connor (1994–1998) – Vocals; Fergal Purcell (1994–1996) – Guitar/song writer Steve Maher (1996–2007) – Guitar; Antoine Arrighi "Denosdrakkh" (–2008) – Guitar

Geasa are a Celtic metal band originating from Dublin, Ireland. Formed by Fergal Purcell and John Kavanagh in 1993 the band combines traditional Celtic music with black metal to form Celtic black metal. They have released one demo album, one EP, and three albums. They came onto the scene in 1994 with the Starside demo. The demo was widely traded in the underground and attributed to the band's later record deal. The demo itself comprises two distinct sounds; from the epic black metal sounding "Empyrean" and "Warrior" penned by Purcell to the more Celtic sounding "Starside" and "Rite of passage" written mainly by Kavanagh. This black metal sound was lost when Purcell quit the band in 1996, resulting in the band's major and sometimes-lamented change in sound style post Starside.

== Etymology ==
The band derived its name from geis (plural: geasa), which in Irish mythology and folklore, is an idiosyncratic taboo, whether of obligation or prohibition, similar to being under a vow or spell. A geis can be compared with a curse or, paradoxically, a gift. If someone under a geis violates the associated taboo, the infractor will suffer dishonor or even death. On the other hand, the observing of one's geasa is believed to bring power. Often it is women who place geasa upon men. In some cases, the woman turns out to be a goddess or other sovereignty figure.

== Discography ==
=== Studio albums ===
- Angel's Cry (1999)
- Fate's Lost Son (2003)
- Godslaughter (2005)

=== Demo albums ===
- Starside (1996)

=== Extended plays ===
- Murder (2004)
