= Leah (musician) =

Canadian musician

Leah McHenry
- Also known as: Leah McHenry
- Born: November 4, 1984 (age 41)
- Origin: Vancouver, British Columbia, Canada
- Genres: Folk metal, symphonic metal, world music
- Occupation: Musician
- Instruments: Voice, keyboard, piano
- Years active: 2011–present
- Member of: Dragonlord
- Formerly of: Project Aegis
- Website: leahmchenrymusic.com

Leah McHenry, mononymously known as Leah (pronounced /liːɑː/ LEE-a) (born November 4, 1984), is a Canadian heavy metal musician who records both as a solo artist and, since around 2015, as a member of Dragonlord. Sometimes called the "Enya of heavy metal", she performs a mixture of symphonic and Celtic metal with folk and world music. As a solo artist, she has released five full-length albums Of Earth & Angels in 2012, Kings & Queens in 2015, The Quest in 2018, Ancient Winter in 2019, and The Glory and the Fallen in 2024; two EPs, Let All Mortal Flesh Keep Silence in 2012 and Otherworld in 2013; and twenty singles, both as part of album releases and as stand-alone recordings. She is a frequent artistic collaborator with Eric Peterson of Testament and Dragonlord, Timo Somers from Delain and Vengeance, Sander Zoer from Delain, Barend Courbois from Blind Guardian and Vengeance, and Troy Donockley of Nightwish. McHenry and Peterson released a collaborative single, "Winter Sun", in 2015. She joined Dragonlord for its 2018 studio album Dominion. She also has participated in the charity group Project Aegis.

== Biography ==
McHenry is from the Vancouver area of British Columbia, Canada, and has English, Irish, and Scottish ancestry. Around age 10 or 11, she started singing in her home. According to McHenry, she mimicked the singing of others — Jim Morrison, Mariah Carey, Tori Amos, it did not matter — until she developed her own style. She eventually taught herself piano and joined the band Ashur, which toured locally and released an EP. She also taught herself a limited amount of guitar.

She released her first solo album, Of Earth & Angels, in June 2012, and Leah performed her first live show in December. She also released a three-track Christmas EP that December. In 2013, she released the EP Otherworld. Eric Peterson contributed to the single "Dreamland" from the EP. In January 2015, she released her second studio album, Kings & Queens. Contributing to the album were Timo Somers of Delain and Vengeance, Sander Zoer of Delain, and Barend Courbois of Blind Guardian and Vengeance. In December of the same year, she and Peterson collaborated on the single "Winter Sun", enlisting the help of the rest of the Dragonlord band line-up and some touring members of Testament to round-out the recording. In 2017, she released "The Dragonborn Comes", a cover version of Jeremy Soule's "Dragonborn" from The Elder Scrolls V: Skyrim – Dragonborn video game expansion. Her third studio album, The Quest, was released on October 5, 2018. The recording featured previous collaborators Somers, Courbois, and Zoer, along with Troy Donockley of Nightwish and Chen Balbus of Orphaned Land. On November 15, 2019, she released Ancient Winter, a Christmas album and her fourth album overall. The album featured more instrumentation from McHenry herself and included contributions from Donockley, Anna Murphy of Cellar Darling and Eluveitie, Shar-Ran Yinon of Eluveitie and Epica, and Rupert Gillett. She also participated in two charity singles by Project Aegis, a charity project organized by Matt Smith of Theocracy: The first, "Angel in the Ashes", was released in 2016, and featured contributions from McHenry, Smith, Rob Rock, Daísa Munhoz of Vandroya and Soulspell, and Vasilis Georgiou and Gus Drax of Sunburst and Black Fate. The second, "And the Rest is a Mystery" was released in 2020, and featured McHenry, Smith, Daniel Heiman of Lost Horizon, Harmony, and Heed, Neal Morse of Spock's Beard and Transatlantic, and Ernie Topran and Val Allen Wood of Theocracy. On February 16, 2024, Leah released her fifth studio album, The Glory and the Fallen, which featured contributions from Somers, Zoer, Mark Jansen of After Forever, Epica, and Mayan, and Dagda of Celtibeerian.

In addition to singing, McHenry plays the piano, keyboards, and some guitar, and teaches herself Celtic harp. McHenry is married and has five children whom she homeschools. She fits her music career around her family commitments, which is partly why she has not yet gone on a concert tour. In addition to her recording career, she also founded a music instruction and marketing company, Savvy Musician Academy, in 2015, and is the CEO and product developer of fantasy and folklore inspired candles at Mythologie Candles.

She now sells online courses for starting businesses and marketing books. It is unclear what experience she has with writing and marketing books.

== Musical style and influences ==
Sometimes referred to as "the metal Enya", McHenry has, in addition to Enya, been compared to Loreena McKennitt, Hayley Westenra, Liv Kristine and Kristine's band Leaves' Eyes, Sharon Den Adel, Moya Brennan (a sister of Enya), Tori Amos, and Blackmore's Night. Her genre is described as symphonic and Celtic metal mixed with folk and world music, as well as folk metal, world music, gothic metal, gothic rock, symphonic gothic metal, power metal, and symphonic power metal, with progressive metal, New Age, and Middle Eastern influences. On Ancient Winter, she shifted away from symphonic metal further into folk rock and world music, including medieval music. During her childhood, she listened to gospel and choir music as well as blues and rock music, such as Jimi Hendrix and The Doors. In her teens she discovered metal music, starting with Dream Theater and then bands such as Symphony X and Nightwish. She considers her discovery of Celtic music and then European symphonic metal to be when she musically found where she belonged. She credits her focus on Celtic music and music of the Middle East evoking the Roman and Persian eras to listening to Loreena McKennitt and Enya, as well as her Celtic ancestry, specifically Irish and Scottish. Other influences on McHenry include Jesse Cook, Enya, early Lacuna Coil, early Within Temptation, "old school" After Forever, Devin Townsend, Nightwish, and Clannad.

== Lyrical themes and ideology ==
McHenry's lyrics and thematic imagery mostly involve fantasy, folklore, and mythology with a medieval European and Insular Celtic focus. Many of her songs include water and ocean themes, and she sometimes sings in other languages such as Irish Gaelic and Latin. McHenry is a Christian but does not consider her music a ministry or associate with the Christian music market and does not explicitly write Christian themes in her music.

== Discography ==
=== Studio albums ===
- Of Earth & Angels - 2012
- Kings & Queens - 2015
- The Quest - 2018
- Ancient Winter - 2019
- The Glory and the Fallen - 2024

=== Extended plays ===
- Let All Mortal Flesh Keep Silence - 2012
- Otherworld - 2013

=== Singles ===
- "Veni Veni Emmanuel (O Come, O Come, Emmanuel)" - 2011
- "Remember (radio edge mix)" - 2012
- "Silent Night" - 2012
- "Matters of the Heart" - 2012
- "We Will Go Home" (cover, from King Arthur) - 2013
- "Here's a Health to the Company" - 2013
- "Dreamland" (featuring Eric Peterson) - 2013
- "Enter the Highlands" - 2014
- "This Present Darkness" - 2015
- "Unbreakable" (Stratovarius cover) - 2015
- "While Your Lips Are Still Red" (Nightwish cover) - 2015
- "Red (Remembrance for the Brave)" (Ten cover) - 2015
- "Winter Sun" (with Eric Peterson) - 2015
- "The Dragonborn Comes" (Jeremy Soule cover, from The Elder Scrolls V: Skyrim) - 2017
- "Elixir of Life" - 2017
- "Edge of Your Sword" - 2018
- "Lion Arises" - 2018
- "Redemption" - 2019
- "Light of the World" - 2019
- "Sanctuary" - 2020
- "Sleeping Giant" (featuring Mark Jansen) - 2022
- "Sleeping Giant (Folk Version)" - 2022
- "Before This War Is Over" - 2023
- "Archangel" - 2024

==== As featured artist ====
- "Light" (Eye of Melian featuring Leah) - 2022
