= Cruachan (band) =

Irish folk metal band

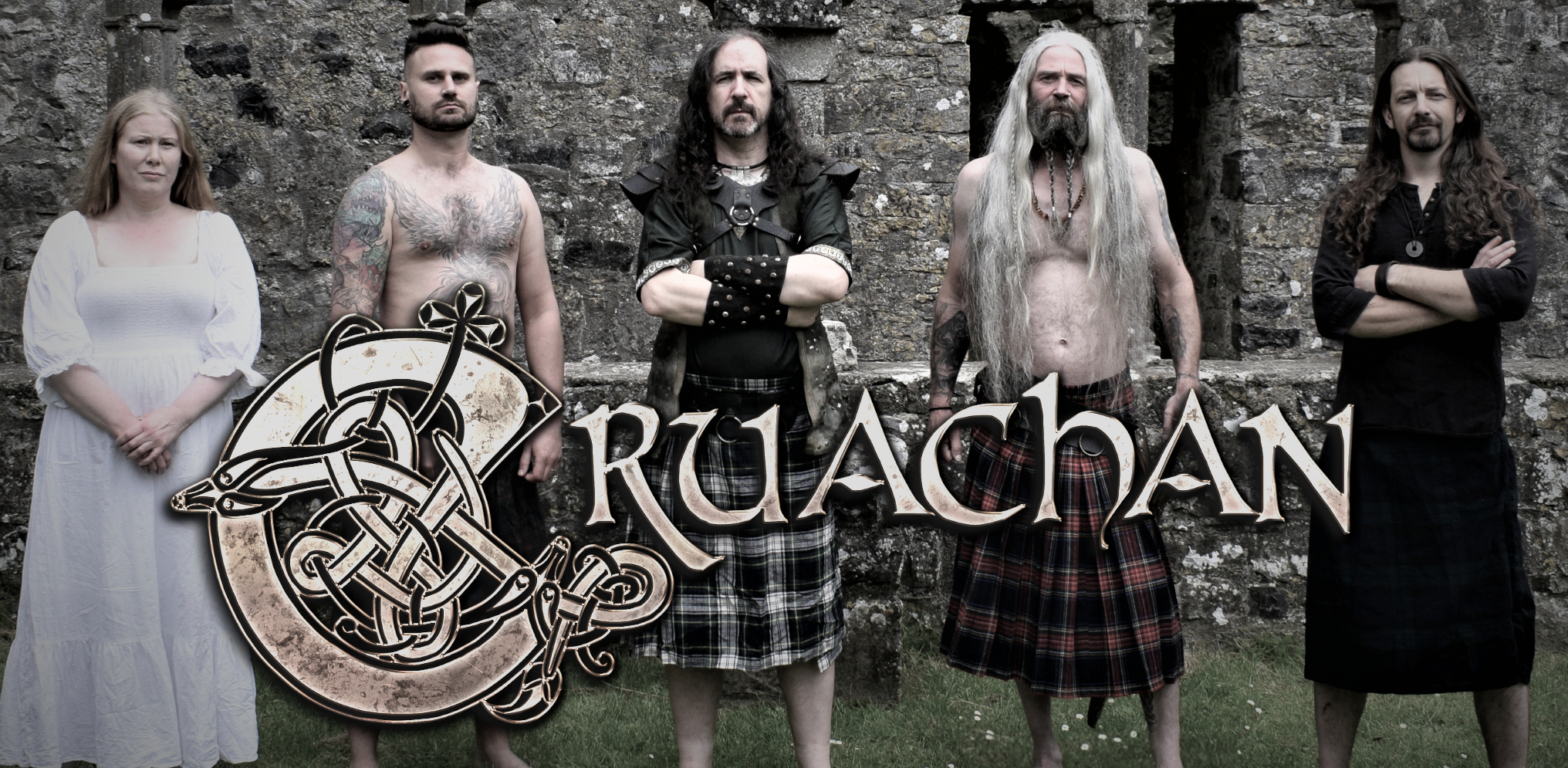
- Cruachan

Background information
- Origin: Dublin, Ireland
- Genres: Folk metal; Celtic metal; black metal
- Years active: 1992–1997, 1998–present
- Labels: Trollzorn; Candlelight; AFM; Karmageddon Media; Hammerheart; Nazgul's Eyrie Productions
- Members: Keith Fay; Joe Farrell; David Quinn; Audrey Trainor; Sterling Paterson
- Website: www.cruachanireland.com

Cruachan (pronounced [ˈkɾˠuəxən̪ˠ]) is an Irish folk metal band formed in Dublin in 1992 by multi-instrumentalist Keith Fay. Focusing on Celtic music and Celtic mythology in its lyrics, Cruachan plays Celtic metal. The band, named after the ancient capital of the kingdom of Connacht, has released nine studio albums, has been recognised as a founder of folk metal, and has been acclaimed as having "gone the greatest lengths of anyone in their attempts to expand" the genre. As of 2026, the lineup features Keith Fay on vocals, guitars, and various folk instruments; bassist Joe Farrell; David Quinn on guitar; Audrey Trainor on violin; and drummer Sterling Paterson.

== History ==
Keith Fay had formed a Tolkien-inspired black metal band named after Minas Tirith in 1991. Around that time, he began listening to more folk music and picked up Skyclad debut album The Wayward Sons of Mother Earth. Released in 1990, this "ambitious" and "groundbreaking" album made an impact on Fay, and he set out to combine black metal with the folk music of Ireland. In 1992, Fay formed Cruachan with a demo recording distributed in 1993. Fay credits Irish rock band Horslips as a "huge influence on Cruachan," further noting that "what they were doing in the 70's is the equivalent of what we do now."

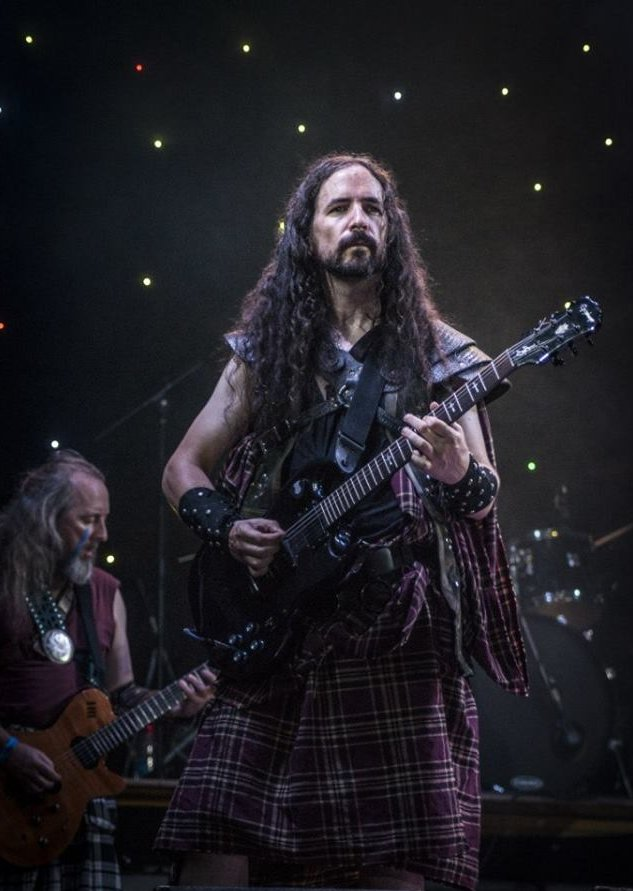
Keith Fay, Ukraine 2014

Cruachan released debut album Tuatha na Gael in 1995, an album that "suffered under poor production." The band received attention from "big label" Century Media Records, though the band were dismayed at the terms and conditions offered. They refused to sign a "very poor contract" that would give the label "the rights to change every aspect of our music." After "lengthy negotiations failed to yield a deal with Century Media Records", the band disbanded in 1997.

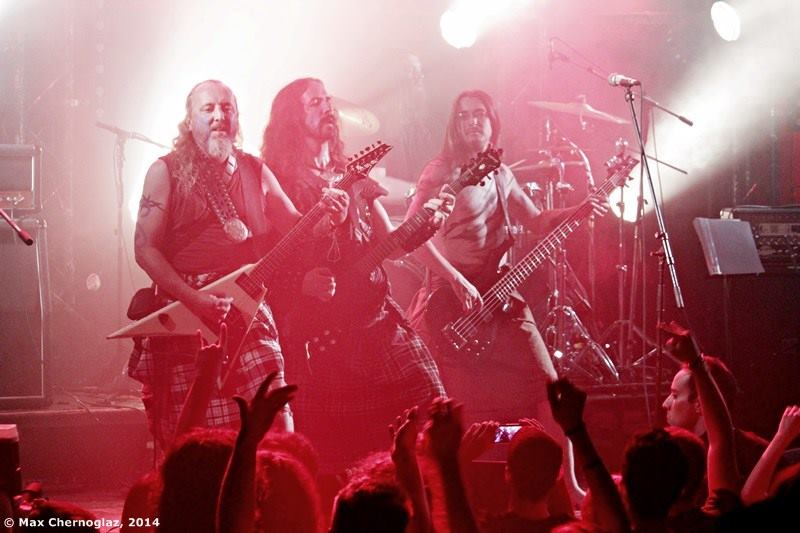
Kieran, Keith and Eric, Russia 2014

Cruachan reformed in January 1999, and after signing with Hammerheart Records, they released second album The Middle Kingdom in 2000. By this time, the band dropped black metal for a traditional metal sound. They invited guest vocalist Karen Gilligan to join permanently. Their subsequent album, Folk-Lore, was co-produced by Shane MacGowan of The Pogues. MacGowan contributed vocals to two covers of traditional Irish songs, "Spancill Hill" and "Ride On". The latter was released as a single, and the band experienced commercial success when it entered the Irish charts.

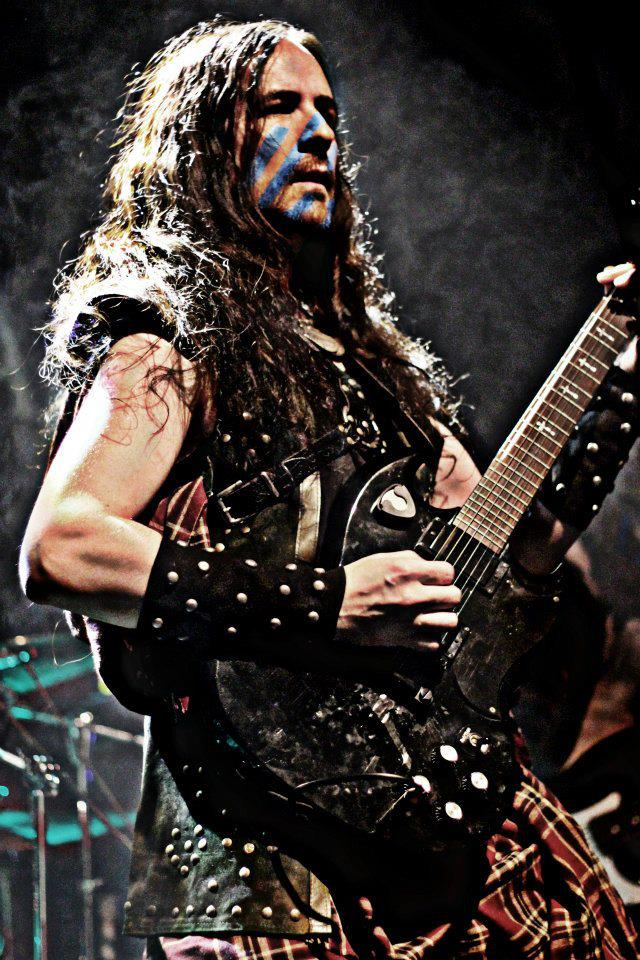
Keith Fay, Dublin, Ireland 2012

The band released their fourth studio album, Pagan, in 2004, with cover artwork by John Howe. Fay criticized the production on the album as "terrible". In 2005, the band left Karmageddon Media "on good terms." For the band's fifth album, Cruachan returned to Sun Studios, where they had recorded their first three albums. The result was The Morrigan's Call, which Fay described as their "best work to date, in every aspect." The album was released in November 2006 through AFM Records. Drummer Joe Farrell left the band shortly thereafter due to "personal reasons", and Colin Purcell replaced him.

In December 2008, vocalist Karen Gilligan left the band "on good terms for various reasons." Fay announced that he would "take over full-time vocal duties while John Ryan and John O' Fathaigh will take on backing vocal roles."

A demo recorded in 2010 showed the band returning to a harder, black metal style. This demo was sent to record labels, and Candlelight Records UK signed them in June 2010. Blood on the Black Robe, the first of the "Trilogy of Blood" albums, was released in 2011.

On 20 February 2011, Fay was assaulted by several men after leaving a nightclub in Dublin. Fay survived the attack with a broken rib, a knife-wound, and extensive bruising.

Cruachan left Candlelight Records and signed with Trollzorn Records in 2014. This was the band's busiest year, with vhigh-profile shows including a Russian tour in March and headline shows in Germany, Ireland, Ukraine and Israel, as well as appearances at Ostrov festival (Russia), Bandershtat festival (Ukraine), HoernerFest (Germany), Brutal Assault (Czech Rep.), Rock for Roots (Germany), Halloween Fest (Italy) and Eindhoven Metal Meeting (The Netherlands). In between these shows, they recorded their next studio album, Blood for the Blood God, released on 5 December 2014. Due to their recording commitments, they turned down Paganfest USA 2014.

John Fay announced his second departure from Cruachan on 24 June 2016. He left after Folk-Lore and appeared on Pagan and The Morrigan's Call as a guest.

On 27 April 2018, Cruachan released their eighth studio album, Nine Years of Blood, a concept album about the Nine Years' War. It was the third and final album of the "Blood Trilogy". This was bassist Eric Fletcher's last album with the band. He left in September 2018 Rustam Shakirzianov replaced him.

On 14 January 2020, Shakirzianov hdeparted the band following their performance on 70000 Tons of Metal earlier that month. On 10 February 2020, former drummer Joe Farrell rejoined the band as Shakirzianov's replacement. On 8 July, drummer Mauro Frison departed the band, though not before playing on the single "The Hawthorn". It was announced on 28 July that fiddle player John Ryan and guitarist Kieran Ball would leave the band. During this period, Fay recruited drummer Tom Woodlock, Audrey Trainor on violin and Dave Quinn on guitar.

In early 2020, Cruachan left Trollzorn Records and signed a multi-album deal with Despotz Records. Their ninth studio album was slated for a late 2022 release.

On 1 October 2022, Cruachan submitted a song to the Eurovision Song Contest 2023 for Ireland. The band was not amongst the final six shortlisted entries to compete in the Irish selection. In late 2023, the band submitted another song to represent Ireland in the Eurovision Song Contest 2024.

On 17 January 2023, the band announced that their ninth studio album, The Living and the Dead, would be released on 24 March 2023.

== Members ==
Current

- Keith Fay – vocals, guitar, keyboards, bodhrán, mandolin, percussion, bouzouki (1992–present)
- Joe Farrell – bass (2020–present); drums (1999–2007)
- Audrey Trainor – violin (2020–present)
- David Quinn – guitar (2020–present)
- Sterling Paterson – drums (2026 –present)

Former

- John Clohessy – bass (1992–2012)
- John (O'Fathaigh) Fay – tin whistles, Irish flute, keyboards, percussion (1993–1997, 1999–2002, 2003, 2008–2016)
- Jay O'Neill – drums, percussion (1993–1997)
- Steven Anderson – guitar, vocals (1993–1994)
- Darryl Conlan – guitar (1992–1993)
- Leon Bias – guitar, mandolin, bouzouki (1994–1995)
- Collette Uí Fathaigh – keyboards (1994–1995)
- Jay Brennan – guitar (1997)
- Aisling Hanrahan – vocals (1997)
- Karen Gilligan – vocals, percussion (1999–2008)
- Edward Gilbert – banjo, guitar, keyboards, tin whistle (2001–2003)
- Colin Purcell – drums, percussion (2007–2012)
- Kieran Ball – guitar (2012–2020)
- Mauro Frison – drums, percussion (2012–2020)
- Eric Fletcher – bass (2012–2018)
- Rustam Shakirzianov – bass (2018–2020)
- John Ryan – violin, banjo, bouzouki (2004–2020); tin whistle (2004–2008)
- Tom Woodlock - drums (2020–2025)

Timeline

== Discography ==
=== Studio albums ===
- Tuatha na Gael (1995)
- The Middle Kingdom (2000)
- Folk-Lore (2002)
- Pagan (2004)
- The Morrigan's Call (2006)
- Blood on the Black Robe (2011)
- Blood for the Blood God (2014)
- Nine Years of Blood (2018)
- The Living and the Dead (2023)

=== Singles ===
- "Ride On" (2001)
- "The Hawthorn" (2020)

=== Demos ===
- Celtica (1994)
- Promo '97 (1997) – also included with 2001 bootleg of Tuatha na Gael
- Untitled (2010) – led to new record deal with Candlelight Records

=== Compilations ===
- A Celtic Trilogy (2002) – boxed set of Tuatha na Gael, The Middle Kingdom and Folk-Lore in picture LP format; limited to 500 copies
- A Celtic Legacy (2007)
