= Primordial (band) =

Irish extreme metal band

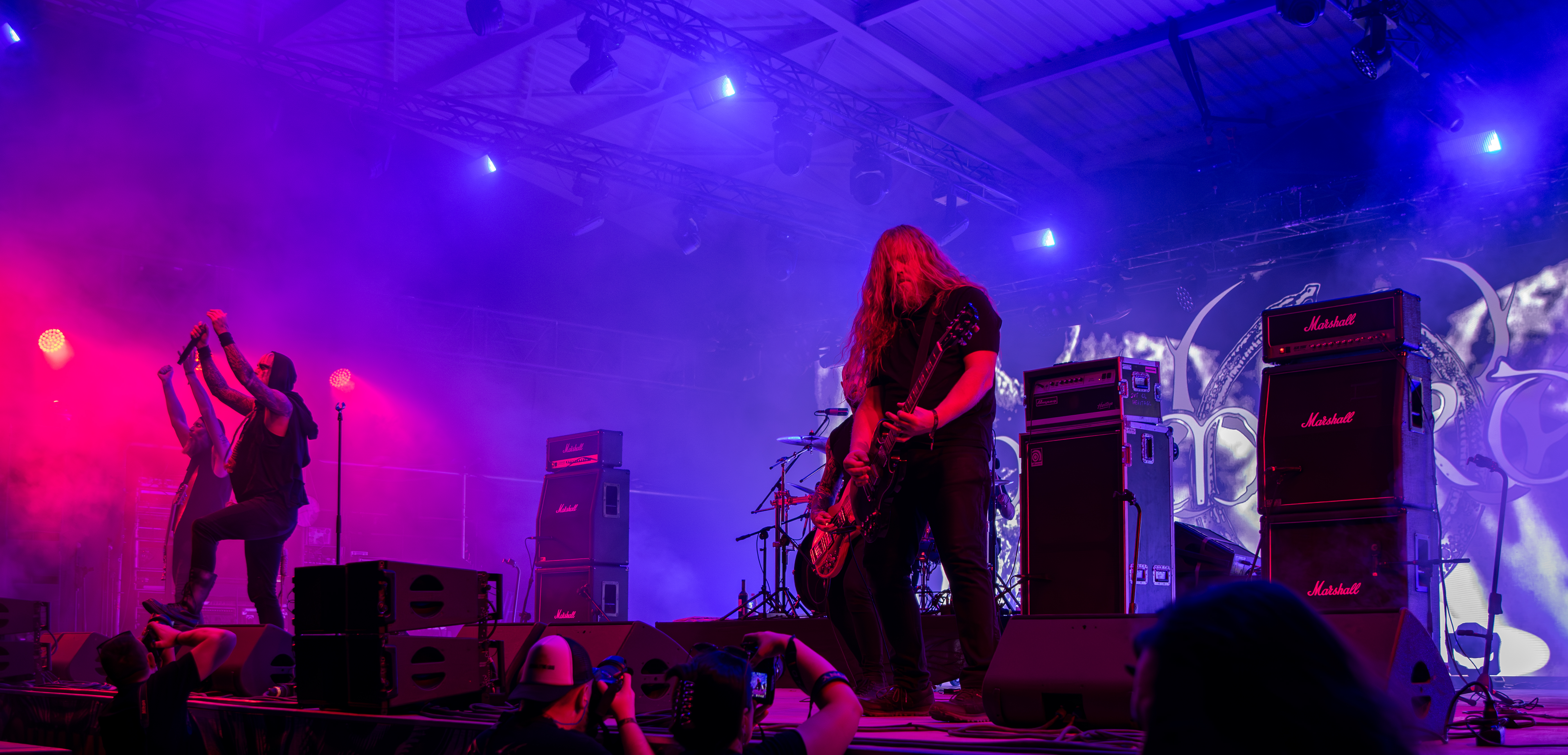
- Primordial, 2024

Background information
- Origin: Skerries, County Dublin, Ireland
- Genres: Pagan metal; black metal; folk metal
- Years active: 1993–present
- Labels: Metal Blade; Hammerheart; Misanthropy; Cacophonous
- Members: Alan Averill "Nemtheanga"; Ciáran MacUiliam; Pól MacAmhlaigh; Simon O'Laoghaire
- Past members: Micheál O'Floinn; Feargal Flannery; Derek MacAmhlaigh
- Website: primordialofficial.com

Primordial are an Irish extreme metal band from Skerries, County Dublin. The band was formed in 1993 by bassist Pól MacAmhlaigh and guitarist Ciarán MacUiliam. Their sound blends black metal with Celtic music.

== History ==
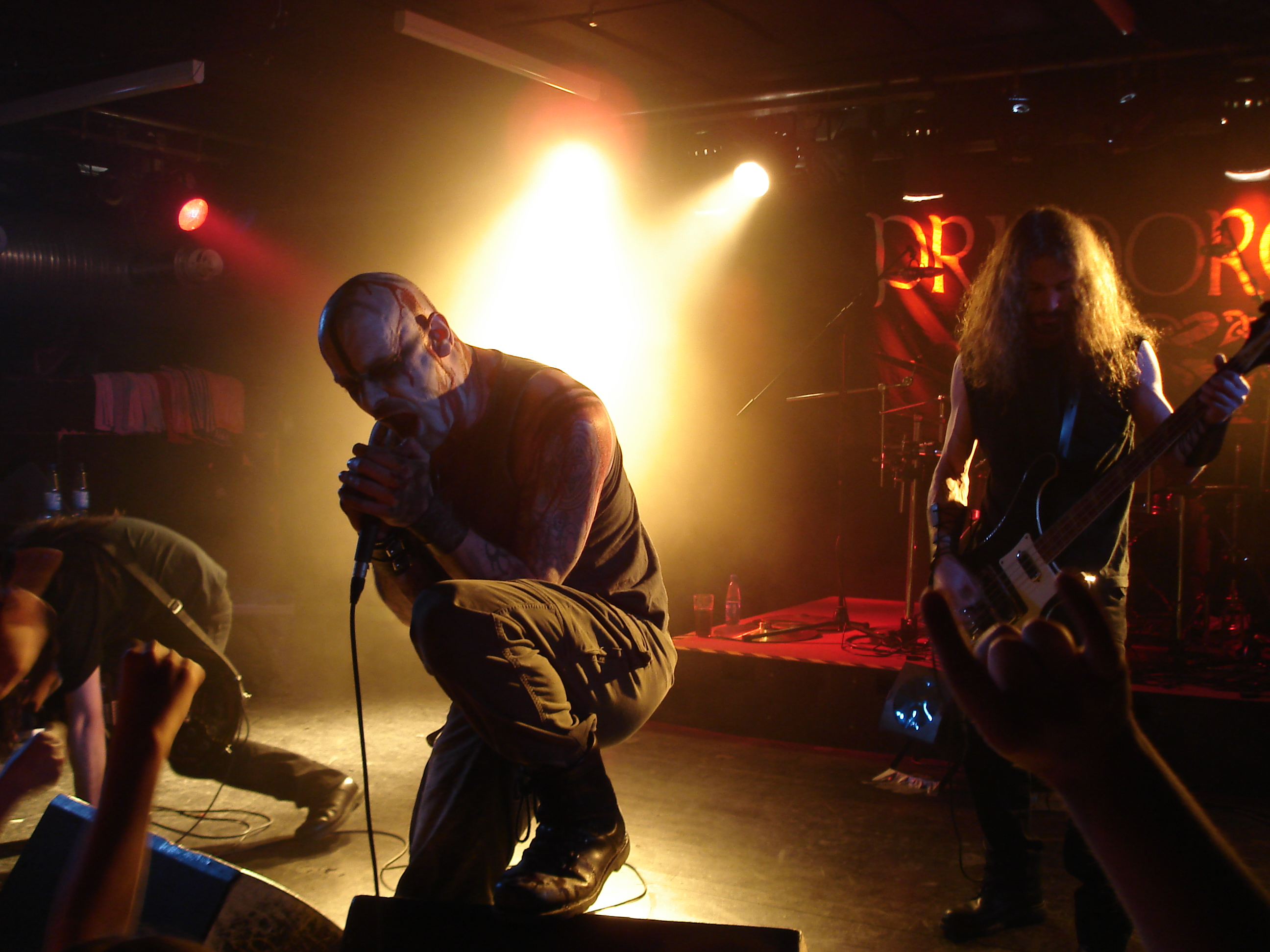
Primordial in 2007

In 1987, MacAmhlaigh and MacUiliam began playing with MacAmhlaigh's brother, Derek. Their band, which they called Forsaken for a brief period band, was a hybrid of early thrash and death metal that played covers of Death, Sepultura and the like.

Vocalist Nemtheanga saw an advertisement for a singer in Dublin metal store The Sound Cellar and joined the band in 1991. The ad was supposedly pasted over less than two hours after it was put up.

After Nemtheanga joined, the band pursued a direction influenced by Bathory, Celtic Frost and the Greek and Norwegian black metal scenes.

Primordial was one of the first Irish black metal bands (Cruachan were active at this time combining black metal with folk music). They released the Dark Romanticism demo in the early summer of 1993. Lee Barrett from the UK label Candlelight Records was interested but failed to signed the band. They sent a live soundboard recording to Cacophonous Records (Cradle of Filth, Bal-Sagoth, etc.), which signed the band for the release of their debut album, Imrama.

Imrama was a melodic black metal record. They refined their sound with A Journey's End, including mandolins and whistles. Subsequent releases The Burning Season and Spirit the Earth Aflame blended black, Celtic, and folk metal. They have toured with various metal bands, including Immortal.

They released their fourth album, Storm Before Calm, in 2002. Fifth album The Gathering Wilderness was darker, bleaker, and rawer than their previous work.Terrorizer magazine name it album of the month, and it made many top lists of the year 2005. In January 2006, the band played their first US show alongside Thyrfing and Moonsorrow at the Heathen Crusade metalfest in Columbia Heights, Minnesota.

The band released their sixth album, To the Nameless Dead, on 16 November 2007. Its raw sound earned praise. In November and December 2010, the band entered Foel Studio in Wales with producer Chris Fielding. Metal Blade released Redemption at the Puritan's Hand on 22 April 2011. In July 2014, Primordial announced their eighth studio album, Where Greater Men Have Fallen. It was released 25 November 2014 in the US and 24 November elsewhere. On 18 April 2018, they released their ninth studio album, Exile Amongst the Ruins. After five years, the band announced their tenth album, How It Ends, would be released on 29 September 2023.

== Members ==
=== Current ===
- Alan Averill "Nemtheanga" – vocals (1993–present)
- Ciáran MacUiliam – guitar (1993–present)
- Pól MacAmhlaigh – bass (1993–present)
- Simon Ó Laoghaire – drums (1997–present)

=== Former ===
- Micheál Ó Floinn – guitar (2001–2022)
- Feargal Flannery – guitar (1997–2001)
- Derek MacAmhlaigh – drums (1993–1997)

=== Session members ===
- Gerry Clince (Mael Mórdha, Death the Leveller) – guitar, bass
- Shauny Cadogan – guitar, bass
- Feargal Flannery – guitar, bass
- Steve Hughes (Slaughter Lord, Nazxul, Apocalypse Command) – drums
- Dave Murphy – bass
- Dave McMahon – bass
- Gareth Averill – drums
- Cathal Murphy – drums

== Gallery ==
Band members at Rock unter den Eichen 2024

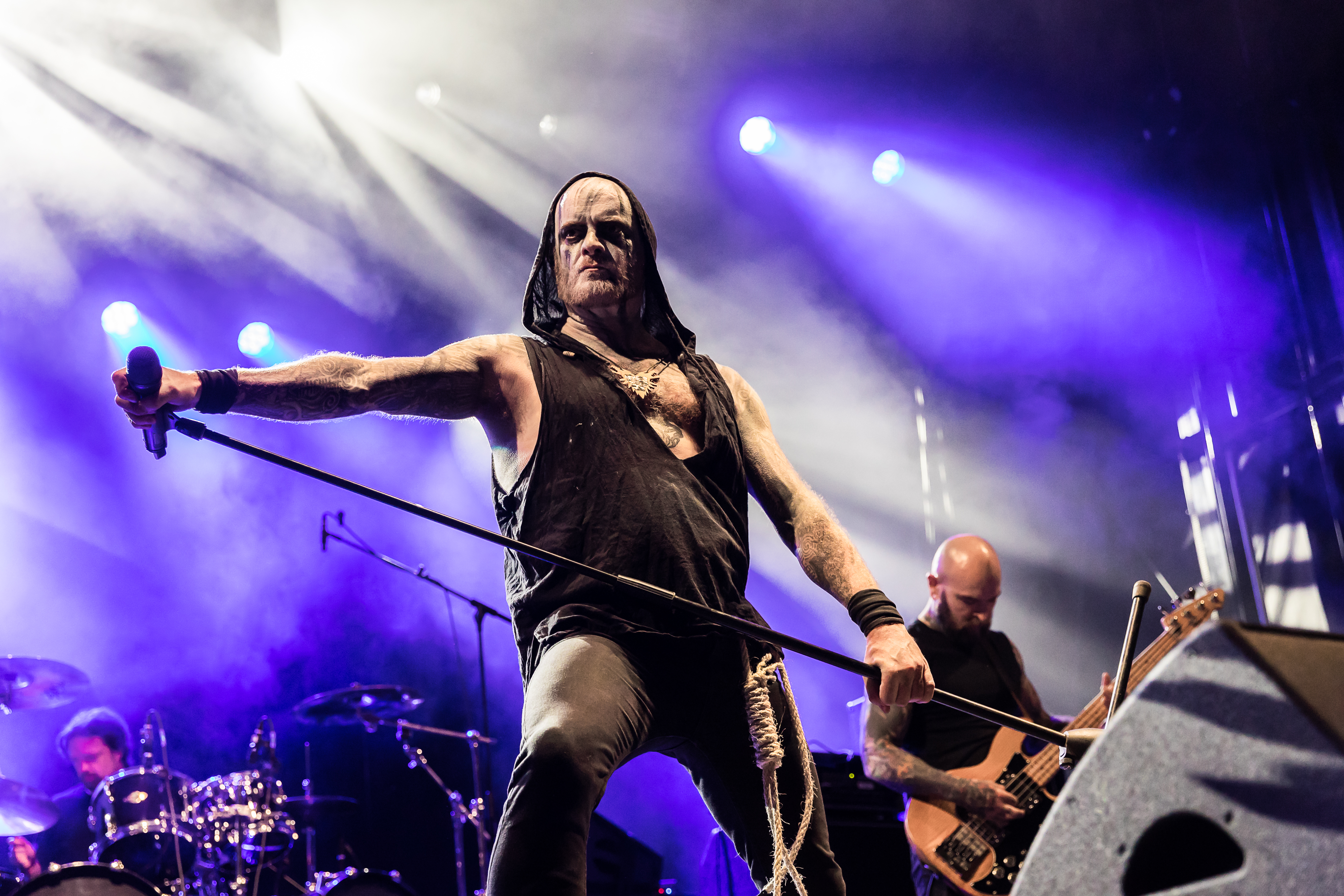
Alan Averill "Nemtheanga", vocals

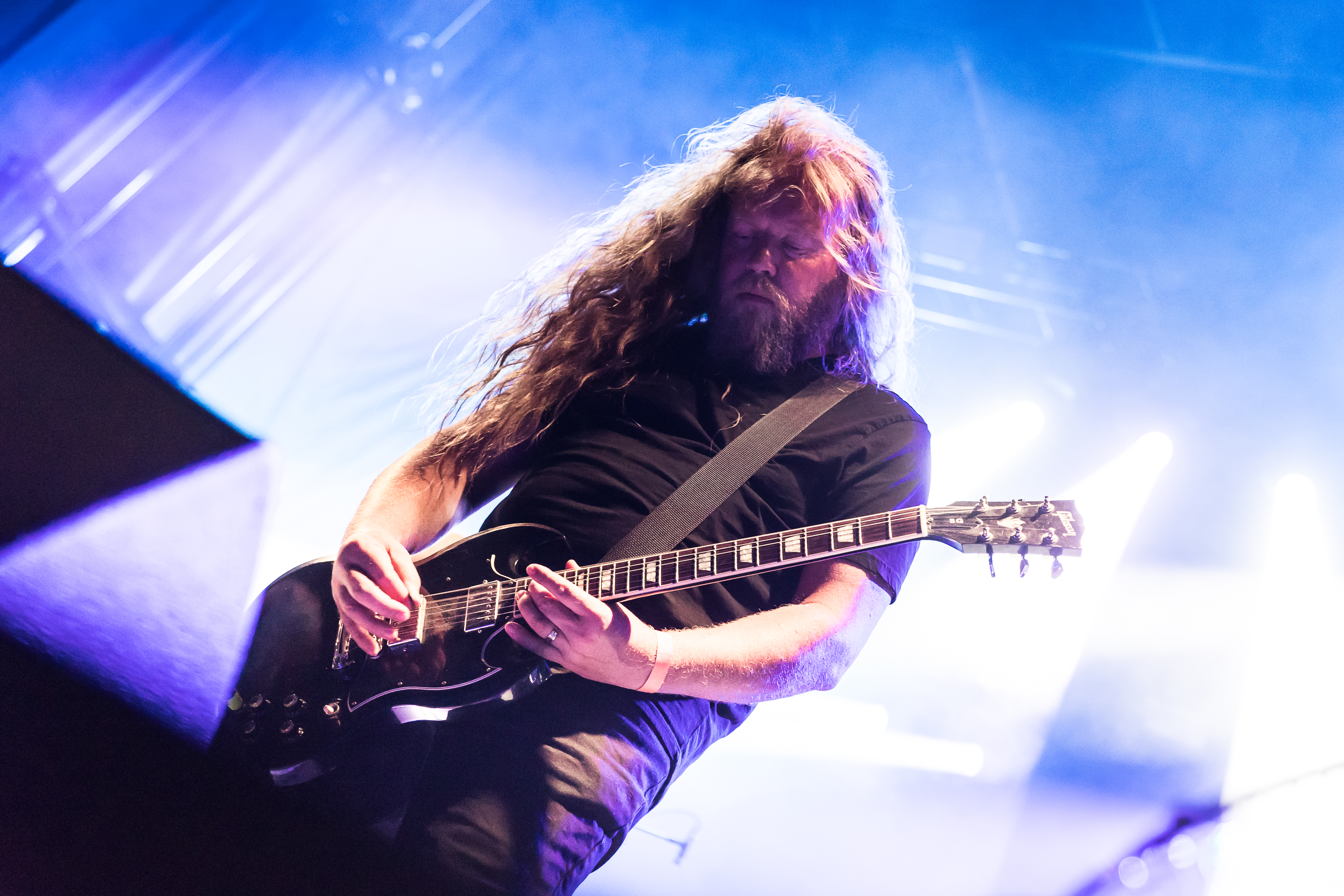
Ciáran MacUiliam, guitar

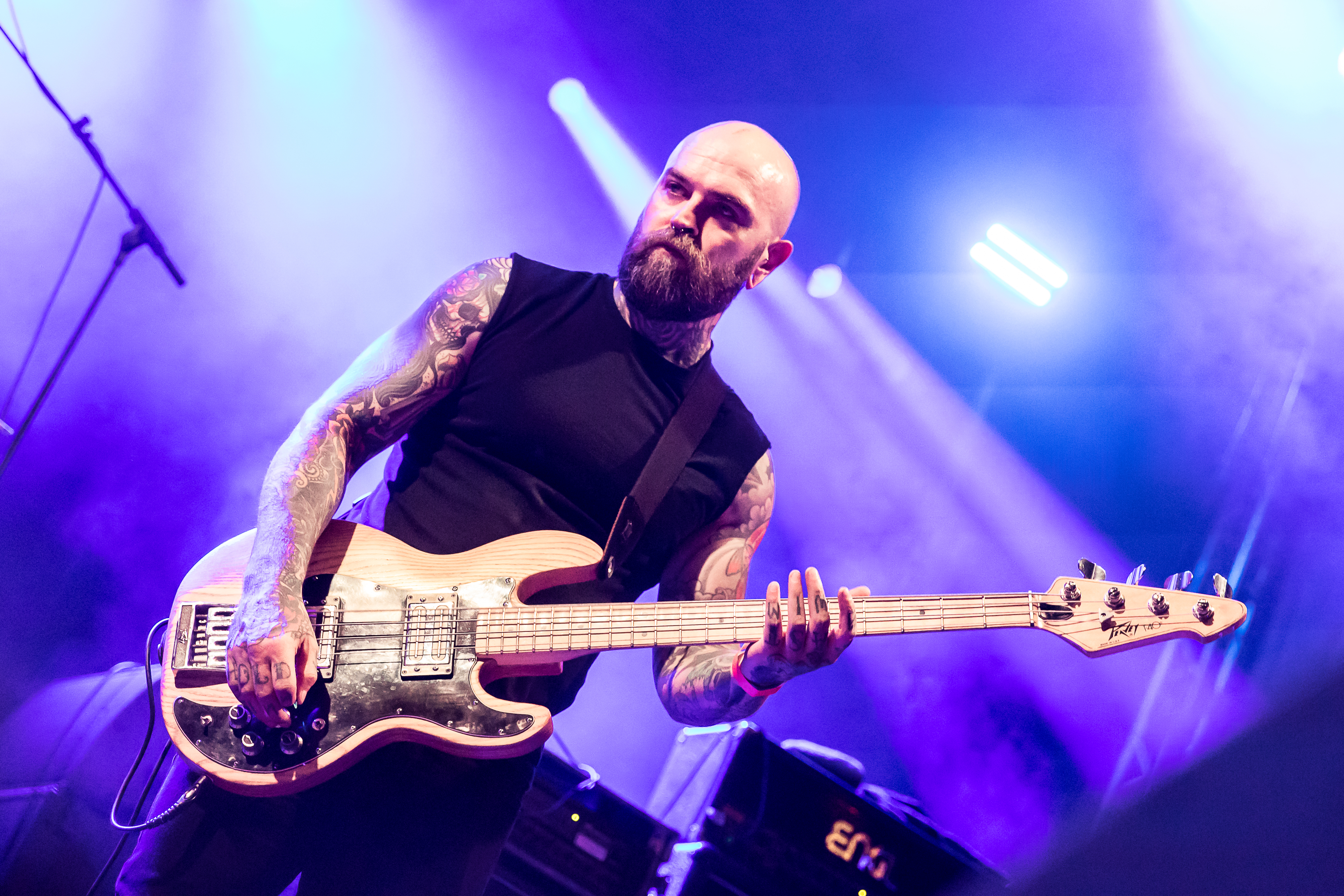
Shauny Cadogan, bass (live)

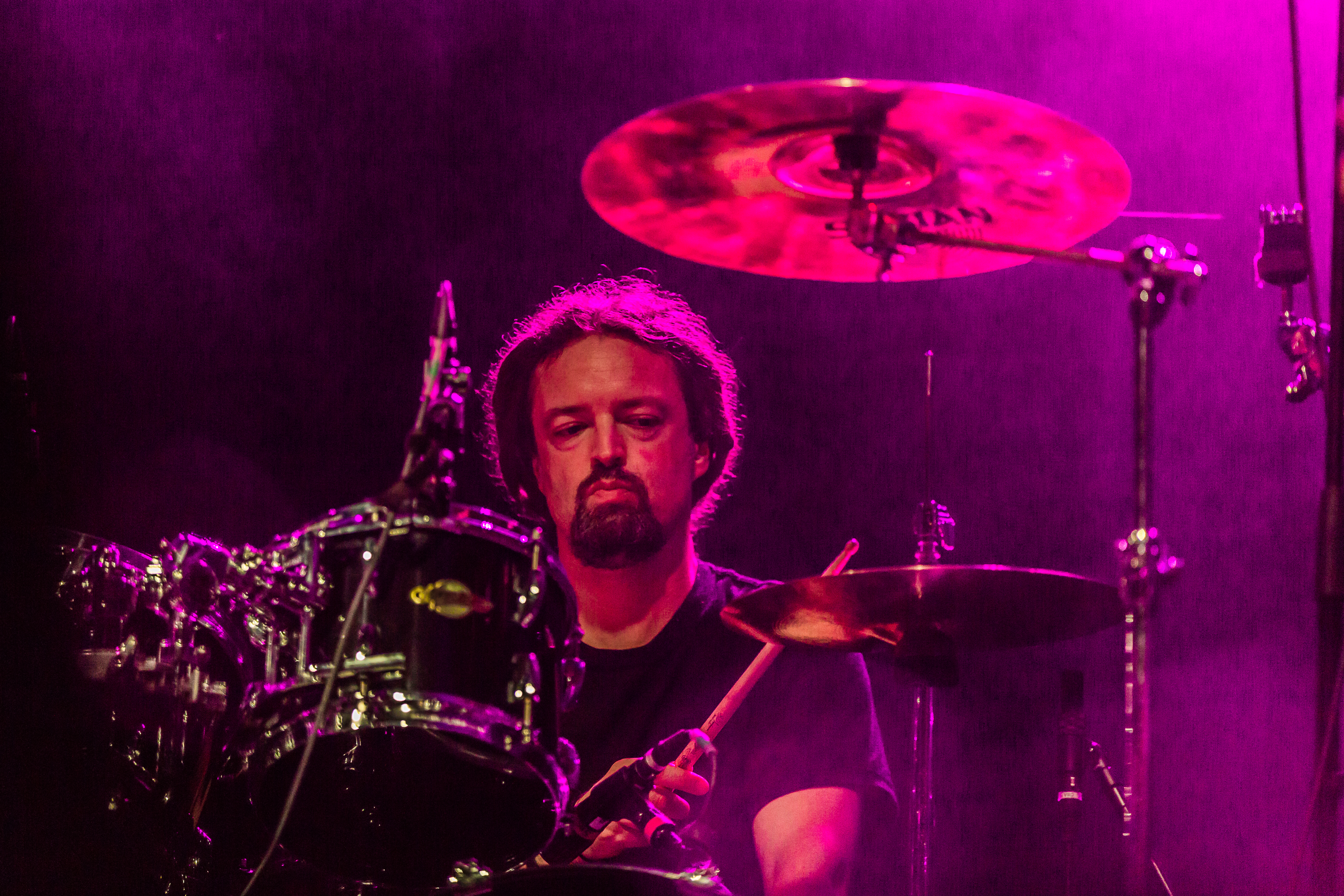
Simon Ó Laoghaire, drums

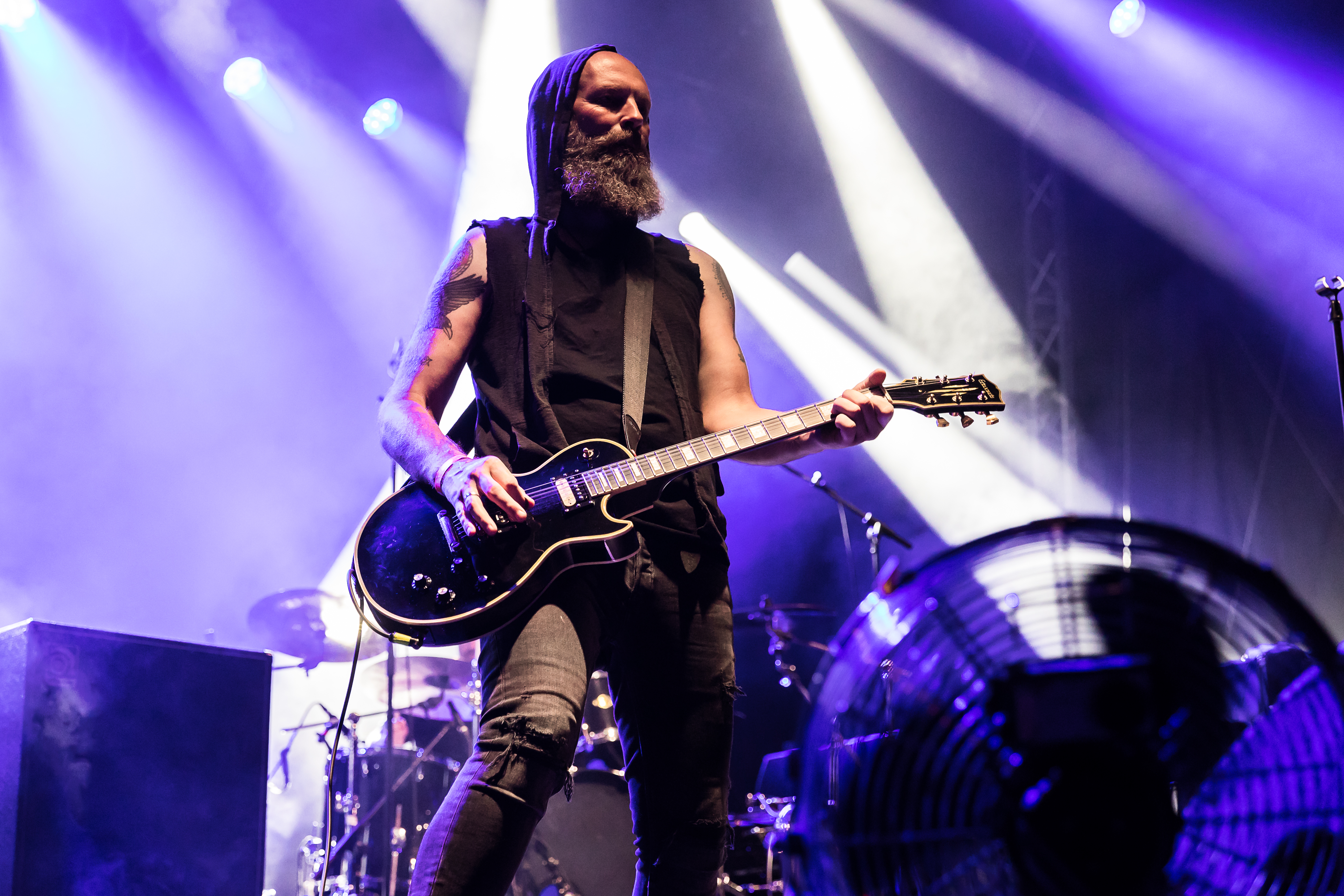
Gerry Clince, guitar (live)

== Discography ==
=== Studio albums ===
- Imrama (1995)
- A Journey's End (1998)
- Spirit the Earth Aflame (2000)
- Storm Before Calm (2002)
- The Gathering Wilderness (2005)
- To the Nameless Dead (2007)
- Redemption at the Puritan's Hand (2011)
- Where Greater Men Have Fallen (2014)
- Exile Amongst the Ruins (2018)
- How It Ends (2023)

=== Live albums ===
- All Empires Fall (2010)
- Gods to the Godless - Live at Bang Your Head Festival Germany 2015 (2016)
- Live in New York City (2026)

=== EPs ===
- The Burning Season (1999)

=== Demos ===
- Dark Romanticism (1993)

=== Split releases ===
- Primordial / Katatonia Split 10" (1996)
- Primordial / Mael Mórdha (2006)
