= Hammerheart Records =

Dutch extreme metal record label

Hammerheart Records (known as Karmageddon Media between 2004 and 2010) is a Dutch independent record label specializing in death metal, black metal, doom metal and folk metal bands from around the world. The label was founded in 1995 and is currently located in Valkenburg aan de Geul. It is incorporated in the Netherlands as Hammerheart Holdings B.V. In 2010, the label changed its name back to Hammerheart Records again and started signing new bands.

== Former artists ==
- Aeternus (currently signed to Dark Essence Records)
- Ancient Rites (currently signed to Season of Mist)
- Carpe Tenebrum
- Cruachan (currently signed to Candlelight Records)
- Dismember (currently signed to Regain Records)
- Forefather (currently signed to Seven Kingdoms)
- Glittertind (currently signed to Napalm Records)
- Ishtar (Broken up)
- Mael Mórdha (currently signed to Candlelight Records)
- Mercenary (currently signed to Century Media Records)
- Mithotyn
- Necrophobic (currently signed to Century Media Records)
- Primordial (currently signed to Metal Blade Records)
- Project: Failing Flesh (currently signed to Burning Star Records)
- Ribspreader (currently signed to Xtreem Music)
- Septic Flesh (currently signed to Nuclear Blast Records)
- Severe Torture (currently signed to Season of Mist)
- Skyfire (currently signed to Pivotal Rockordings)
- Thyrfing (currently signed to Regain Records)
- Torture Killer (currently signed to Dynamic Arts Records)

== See also ==
- List of record labels
