= Pagan metal =

Subgenre of metal music

- Stylistic origins: Extreme metal; black metal; pagan folk; folk metal; Viking metal
- Cultural origins: Early 1990s, Northern Europe

Other topics
- Celtic metal; pagan rock; folk religion; modern paganism; Polytheistic reconstructionism; neofolk

Pagan metal is a genre of heavy metal music which fuses extreme metal with "the pre-Christian traditions of a specific culture or region" through thematic concept, rustic melodies, unusual instruments or archaic languages, usually referring to folk metal or black metal. The Norwegian band In the Woods... was one of the first bands commonly viewed as pagan metal. Metal Hammer author Marc Halupczok wrote that Primordial's song "To Enter Pagan" from the band's demo "Dark Romanticism" contributed to defining the genre.

== Characteristics ==
Pagan metal is "more of an idea than a genre" and consequently bands tend to be "wildly different" from one another. Bassist Jarkko Aaltonen of the band Korpiklaani notes that bands singing about "Vikings or other ancient tribes of people are all labelled as pagan", regardless of whether they use folk instruments. Heri Joensen expressed a similar description of pagan metal as bands that sing about "pre-Christian, European traditions, be they historical or mythological" and notes that it is "musically extremely diverse because it is more about the lyrics than the music". Some bands are known to be "sprightly and spirited" while others are "bleak and doomy". Vocal styles range from "melodic chanting to unearthly growling" and while some acts sing in their native language, others sing in English.

Pagan metal bands are often associated with Viking metal and folk metal. Bands such as Moonsorrow and Kampfar have been identified as fitting within all three of those genres.

== History ==
Led Zeppelin and Manowar had already explored pagan themes in the 1970s and 1980s though pagan metal bands share few if any similarities, preferring instead to credit the influence of bands such as Bathory, Enslaved, Amorphis, and Skyclad. Bathory and Enslaved are also known as Viking metal bands while Amorphis and Skyclad are also known as folk metal bands.

Jarkko Aaltonen notes that Black Sabbath "was quite pagan" as well but of "the current metal scene", he credits Skyclad as starting "the mix of traditional folk-rock music with mythology-concentrated lyrics". Chrigel Glanzmann of Eluveitie similarly credits Skyclad as the first pagan metal band, remarking that the band had mixed heavy metal music with Celtic folk music "in a way that was really inspiring". The author Ian Christe has also identify Skyclad as the pioneers of pagan metal. In contrast, Heri Joensen credits Bathory as the first pagan metal act instead, noting that Bathory had gotten "tired of the childishness of satanic lyrics, so they added some cultural weight by going to Nordic mythology". Alan A. Nemtheanga of Primordial remarks that one "can see the formation of pagan metal" in Bathory's 1988 album Blood Fire Death. He also contends that Bathory "were copying Manowar, which most people don't like to admit". Mathias Nygård of Turisas identified Amorphis as the first pagan metal band for playing "a huge role in guiding us in the direction we are now".

In April 2008, performers on the folk and pagan metal festival Paganfest were subject to accusations of being neo-Nazis and fascists from the Berliner Institut für Faschismusforschung. Ville Sorvali of Moonsorrow and Heri Joensen of Týr issued a joint video statement to refute these accusations, noting that "one of the biggest issues seems to be that we use ancient Scandinavian symbols in our imagery like the S in the Moonsorrow logo and the T in the Týr logo [even though] that is how the S and the T runes have been written for thousands of years". Moonsorrow has also issued a written statement in response to the controversy while Týr notes on their official website that they "got the idea for the rune logo" from the Black Sabbath album of the same name. Other pagan metal bands such as Skyforger have also disassociated themselves from Nazism, fascism or racism. Skyforger went as far as to add the words 'No Nazi Stuff Here!' on the back of their album covers.

As of 2009, the genre has become something of a phenomenon. Mikael Karlbom of Finntroll feels that pagan metal has become something of a trend. Jarkko Aaltonen of Korpiklaani expresses a similar opinion and laments the number of people "jumping on a bandwagon". Johan Hegg of Amon Amarth has distanced his band from the trend, stating that "We don’t really see ourselves as one of those bands doing pagan folklore music."

== See also ==
- Folk metal
- Viking metal
- Ambient black metal
- Neopagan music
