= Celtic metal =

Subgenre of folk metal that fuses heavy metal with Celtic rock

- Stylistic origins: Celtic music; folk metal; black metal; heavy metal
- Cultural origins: Mid-1990s, Ireland
- Typical instruments: Vocals; Electric guitar; electric bass guitar; electronic musical keyboard; drum kit; violin; bagpipes; uilleann pipes; tin whistle; accordion; flute; harp; bodhrán; fiddle; banjo; mandolin

Regional scenes
- Ireland, Scotland, Wales, Brittany

Other topics
- List of bands; Celtic fusion; Celtic neopaganism; Celtic punk; Celtic Revival

Celtic metal is a subgenre of folk metal that emerged in Ireland during the early 1990s. It fuses the intensity of heavy metal with traditional Celtic music, incorporating instruments such as the tin whistle, bodhrán, and uilleann pipes. The genre is characterised by its blending of metal's aggressive elements with the melodic and rhythmic structures of Celtic folk, often drawing on themes from Irish mythology and history.

The genesis of Celtic metal is closely linked to the Irish band Cruachan, formed in 1992 by Keith Fay. Inspired by the English band Skyclad and the Irish rock group Horslips, Cruachan sought to merge black metal with Irish folk music. Their debut album, Tuatha na Gael (1995), is considered a seminal work in the genre. Around the same time, other Irish bands like Primordial and Waylander also began exploring similar musical territories, each bringing their unique interpretations to the fusion of metal and Celtic music. These bands laid the foundation for what would become a vibrant subgenre within the metal community.

Over the years, Celtic metal has expanded beyond Ireland, with bands from various countries incorporating Celtic elements into their music. Swiss band Eluveitie, for example, combines melodic death metal with Celtic melodies and instruments, even using lyrics in the ancient Gaulish language. Other notable bands include Spain's Mägo de Oz, Germany's Suidakra, and Canada's Leah, each bringing their cultural perspectives to the genre.

== History ==
Skyclad were the original Folk Metal band I suppose and they certainly influenced both Waylander and Cruachan, but coming from Ireland I'm sure both Keith [Fay of Cruachan] and myself thought we had a divine right to play Folk Metal, especially as we're both influenced by the Horslips as well.

— Ciaran O'Hagan of Waylander

The origins of Celtic metal can be traced to the earliest known exponent of folk metal, the English band Skyclad. Their "ambitious" and "groundbreaking" debut album The Wayward Sons of Mother Earth was released in 1990 with the song "The Widdershins Jig" acclaimed as "particularly significant" and "a certain first in the realms of Metal". This debut album made an impact on a young Keith Fay who had formed a Tolkien-inspired black metal band by the name of Minas Tirith.

Inspired by the music of Skyclad and Horslips, Keith Fay set out to combine black metal with the folk music of Ireland. He formed the Irish band Cruachan in 1992 with a demo recording released in 1993. Like Waylander, Keith Fay also credits the Irish rock band Horslips as a "huge influence on Cruachan," further noting that "what they were doing in the 70s is the equivalent of what we do now." Cruachan's debut album Tuatha na Gael was released in 1995 and the band has since been acclaimed as having "gone the greatest lengths of anyone in their attempts to expand" the genre of folk metal. With a specific focus on Celtic music and the use of Celtic mythology in their lyrics, Cruachan's style of folk metal is known today as Celtic metal.

Parallel to Cruachan, the black metal act Primordial also released a demo recording in 1993 and "found themselves heralded as frontrunners in the burgeoning second-wave black metal movement." Irish music plays "a very big role" in Primordial but in "a dark and subtle way" through the chords and timings.

The year 1993 also saw the formation of Waylander. With vocalist Ciaran O'Hagan fronting the group, they released a demo recording in 1995. A debut album Reawakening Pride Once Lost was unveiled in 1998. O'Hagan notes that it was a coincidence that "Primordial, Cruachan and Waylander sprang up within little more than a year of each other." Since then a few other bands from Ireland have emerged to perform Celtic metal including Geasa and Mael Mórdha.

Since the turn of the millennium, the genre has expanded and many bands beyond the shores of Ireland can be found today performing Celtic metal. This includes Eluveitie from Switzerland, Ithilien from Belgium, Mägo de Oz from Spain, Suidakra from Germany, Leah from Canada, Skiltron from Argentina, and Gun Ghaol - who perform entirely in Scottish Gaelic - from Scotland.

Despite the Irish origins of the genre, Celtic metal is not known to be popular in Ireland. Ciaran O'Hagan of Waylander notes that while "Primordial are Ireland's biggest Metal band in terms of sales and international profile" the band would be "lucky to sell much more than 500 copies of their albums in their own country or pull more than 300 punters to a gig." Bands in the genre have experienced a more enthusiastic reception elsewhere with Mägo de Oz notably experiencing strong chart success in Latin America and their native Spain.

== Characteristics ==
Similar to its parent genre of folk metal, the music of Celtic metal is a diverse collection with bands pursuing different subgenres of heavy metal music. While bands such as Suidakra ply their trade with the more extreme subgenres of black or death metal, other groups like Mägo de Oz and Skiltron prefer a more traditional or power metal sound, Leah performs a symphonic metal sound with world music influences, and Gun Ghaol perform modern metalcore.

Many bands in the genre enhance their sound with the use of a folk instrument. Bagpipes are used by bands such as Skiltron and Ithilien. The fiddle is used by such bands as Mägo de Oz, Ithilien and Eluveitie. The tin whistle and flute can be found in such bands as Cruachan, Ithilien, Waylander and Eluveitie, while the Irish bands of the genre make use of native instruments such as the uilleann pipe and bodhrán.

== See also ==
- List of Celtic metal bands
