= List of shipwrecks in December 1873 =

The list of shipwrecks in December 1873 includes ships sunk, foundered, grounded, or otherwise lost during December 1873.

== 1 December ==
List of shipwrecks: 1 December 1873
Ship	State	Description
Burlington	United Kingdom	The steamship collided with the steamship Haken Adelstein (Norway) and sank in the River Thames at Greenwich, Kent. Her crew were rescued. Burlington was on a voyage from Königsberg, Germany to London.
Carl Herman	Germany	The collier was wrecked in the Rottum Islands, Groningen, Netherlands with the loss of all hands.
Dart	United Kingdom	The ship was driven ashore and wrecked at Methil, Fife. Her crew were rescued.
Dr. Petermann	Germany	The barque was driven ashore at Stornoway, Isle of Lewis, United Kingdom. She was on a voyage from Newcastle upon Tyne, Northumberland, United Kingdom to Rio de Janeiro, Brazil. She was refloated on 23 December, and placed under repair in January 1874.
Euphrates	Norway	The barque was driven ashore on Texel, North Holland, Netherlands with the loss of her captain. She was on a voyage from Dieppe, Seine-Inférieure to Tønsberg.
Jubilee	United Kingdom	The ship ran aground on the Horse Bank, in the Irish Sea off the coast of Lancashire. She was on a voyage from Newry, County Antrim to Preston, Lancashire.
Unnamed	Flag unknown	The barque was driven ashore on the coast of Somerset.

== 2 December ==
List of shipwrecks: 2 December 1873
Ship	State	Description
Angostura	United Kingdom	The ship ran aground in the River Lune. She was on a voyage from Greenock, Renfrewshire to the River Lune. She was refloated.
Eroe	United Kingdom	The brig was wrecked on Scroby Sands, Norfolk. Her crew survived. She was on a voyage from Sunderland, County Durham to Rochester, Kent.
Euphrates	Norway	The barque was driven ashore on Texel, North Holland, Netherlands with the loss of her captain. She was on a voyage.
Jacob Kjelland	Norway	The crewless barque was driven ashore at Blokhus, Denmark. She subsequently broke up.
Norfolk Hero	United Kingdom	The ship ran aground. She was on a voyage from South Shields, County Durham to Tarragona, Spain. She was refloated and taken in to Ramsgate, Kent in a leaky condition.
Sir George Grey	United Kingdom	The paddle tug suffered a boiler explosion and sank in the Crosby Channel, off the coast of Lancashire with the loss of one of her six crew. Survivors were rescued by the barque Lamartine (France).
Telegraph	United Kingdom	The tug sank at Grimsby, Lincolnshire. She was refloated.

== 3 December ==
List of shipwrecks: 3 December 1873
Ship	State	Description
Celerity	United Kingdom	The steamship departed from Riga, Russia for Stettin, Germany. Subsequently foundered in the Baltic Sea with the loss of all 21 crew; a boat with a dead body on board washed up at Ventava, Courland Governorate.
Lochnagar	United Kingdom	The schooner ran aground off the Nakkehoved Lighthouse, Denmark. She was on a voyage from Danzig to Newcastle upon Tyne, Northumberland. She was refloated and towed in to Helsingør, Denmark in a leaky condition.
Surbiton	United Kingdom	The ship departed from Riga for Stettin. No further trace, presumed foundered with the loss of all hands.
St. Kevin	United Kingdom	The ship caught fire at Quebec City, Canada. Arson was suspected as the cause.
Westella	United Kingdom	The steamship ran aground in the River Thames. She was on a voyage from Patras, Greece to London. She was refloated and completed her voyage.
Unnamed	Flag unknown	The schooner ran aground on the East Hoyle Bank, in Liverpool Bay.

== 4 December ==
List of shipwrecks: 4 December 1873
Ship	State	Description
Economist	United Kingdom	The ship ran aground off Barry Island, Glamorgan. She was on a voyage from Quebec City, Canada to Llanelly, Glamorgan.
Johanna Margaretha	Norway	The brig ran aground on the Kish Bank, in the Irish Sea. She was refloated and put back to Dublin, United Kingdom in a leaky condition.
Julia	Canada	The ship departed from Savanna, Georgia for Liverpool, Lancashire. No further trace, presumed foundered with all hands.
Liffey	United Kingdom	The steamship ran aground at Hayle, Cornwall.
Nautilus	Sweden	The barque was wrecked on the Horn Reef, in the Baltic Sea. She was on a voyage from Gävle to London.
Problem	United Kingdom	The brigantine struck the Swan Rock, in the Farne Islands, Northumberland and sank. Her crew survived.

== 5 December ==
List of shipwrecks: 5 December 1873
Ship	State	Description
Lizzie	United Kingdom	The steamship ran aground in the Daugava at "Muhlgraben", Russia.
Mary Celeste	United States	The brigantine was discovered abandoned in the Atlantic Ocean (38°20′N 17°15′W) by the brigantine Dei Gratia ( Canada), which put three of her crew aboard. Mary Celeste was taken in to Gibraltar.

== 6 December ==
List of shipwrecks: 6 December 1873
Ship	State	Description
Ardgowan	United Kingdom	The paddle steamer collided with the steamship Clara (United Kingdom) and sank in the Clyde at Greenock, Renfrewshire. All on board, more than 50 people, were rescued by Clara. Ardgowan was on a voyage from Greenock to Lochgilphead, Argyllshire.
Cairo	Italy	The steamship collided with the steamship Cramlington (United Kingdom) and was beached at Winterton-on-Sea, Norfolk, United Kingdom. She was on a voyage from London to Newcastle upon Tyne, Northumberland, United Kingdom. She was refloated on 10 December and towed in to Lowestoft, Suffolk.
Karl der Grosse	Germany	The ship was wrecked at Thisted, Denmark with the loss of all hands.
Paladin	United Kingdom	The steamship collided with HMS Serapis (Royal Navy) at Malta. Paladin was on a voyage from Taganrog, Russia to a British port. She was severely damaged and beached. She was later refloated and taken in to Malta.

== 7 December ==
List of shipwrecks: 7 December 1873
Ship	State	Description
Alicia	United Kingdom	The ship was driven ashore and wrecked in Loch Don. Her crew were rescued.
Daar	Russia	The ship was wrecked at Poti.
Jessy	United Kingdom	The barque foundered at sea. Her crew were rescued by Tyro ( Canada).

== 8 December ==
List of shipwrecks: 8 December 1873
Ship	State	Description
Amphion	Canada	The brig was driven ashore at Belfast, County Antrim, United Kingdom. She was refloated.
Colombo	United Kingdom	The steamship ran aground on the Barnard Sand, in the North Sea off the coast of Suffolk. She was on a voyage from Alexandria, Egypt to Hull, Yorkshire. She was refloated and resumed her voyage.
Consolation	United Kingdom	The fishing lugger collided with the steamship Vaderland (Belgium) off South Foreland, Kent and sank.
Elizabeth	United Kingdom	The schooner was beached in Cloghy Bay. She was on a voyage from Liverpool, Lancashire to Belfast.
Fredericke Sophie	Denmark	The schooner was driven ashore on Manø.
Orion	Sweden	The ship was driven ashore on Manø. She was on a voyage from Hartlepool, County Durham, United Kingdom to Kiel, Germany.

== 9 December ==
List of shipwrecks: 9 December 1873
Ship	State	Description
Thornhill	United States	The barque was wrecked at Point de Mots, Quebec, Canada. She was on a voyage from Quebec City, Canada to Liverpool, Lancashire, United Kingdom.
William Shaw	(United Kingdom of Great Britain and Ireland) Cape Colony	The schooner was wrecked at the mouth of the Mzimvubu River.
Unnamed	United Kingdom	The Thames barge was run down and sunk by a tug in the River Thames with the loss of both crew.

== 10 December ==
List of shipwrecks: 10 December 1873
Ship	State	Description
Star	United Kingdom	The steamship was driven ashore near New Brighton, Cheshire. She was on a voyage from Liverpool, Lancashire to Dublin. She was refloated and resumed her voyage.

== 11 December ==
List of shipwrecks: 11 December 1873
Ship	State	Description
Amanda	Germany	The ship was driven ashore on Amrum. Her crew were rescued. She was on a voyage from the Elbe to the Eider.
Amy	United Kingdom	The brig ran aground at the Pigeon House Fort, Dublin and caught fire. The fire was extinguished. She was refloated on 23 December and taken in to Dublin.
Ernst Moritz Arndt	Germany	The steamship ran aground at Gilleleje, Denmark and was severely damaged. She was on a voyage from New York, United States to Stettin.
Galatea	Trinity House	The steamship was driven ashore at Dungeness, Kent. She was refloated.
Iron King	United Kingdom	The steamship was wrecked in the Gulf of Saint Vincent. All on board were rescued.
Max Dinse	Germany	The ship was driven ashore on Spiekeroog. Her crew were rescued. She was on a voyage from New York to Hamburg.
Ouse	United Kingdom	The steamship ran aground in the Danube.
Sportsman	United Kingdom	The ship was wrecked near Cape Pappas, Greece.
Swansea	United Kingdom	The ship collided with the schooner Princess Helena (United Kingdom) and sank at Gibraltar.

== 12 December ==
List of shipwrecks: 12 December 1873
Ship	State	Description
Meteor	United Kingdom	The steamship was driven ashore at Dungeness, Kent. She was on a voyage from Antwerp, Belgium to Dublin.
Preston	United Kingdom	The ship caught fire at Havre de Grâce, Seine-Inférieure, France. She was on a voyage from New Orleans, Louisiana, United States to Havre de Grâce. The fire was later extinguished.

== 13 December ==
List of shipwrecks: 13 December 1873
Ship	State	Description
Eugene and André	France	The ship was driven ashore near Minden. She was on a voyage from Trinidad to Saint-Nazaire, Ille-et-Vilaine.
Greece	United States	The steamship ran aground in the Hudson River. She was refloated.
Iron King	United Kingdom	The ship was wrecked on the Troubridge Shoals. All on board were rescued.
Magdala	United Kingdom	The brig ran aground in the James River. She was on a voyage from Liverpool, Lancashire to Norfolk, Virginia, United States.
Mongol	United Kingdom	The steamship was wrecked on a reef 14 nautical miles (26 km) off Hong Kong with the loss of sixteen of her crew. She was on a voyage from Hong Kong to Yokohama, Japan.

== 14 December ==
List of shipwrecks: 14 December 1873
Ship	State	Description
Caroline	United Kingdom	The ship was driven onto the Garrec Rocks, on the coast of Finistère, France. She was on a voyage from Cardiff, Glamorgan to Beauvoir, Manche.
Charger	United States	The clipper ran aground on a reef 10 nautical miles (19 km) off Cebu, Spanish East Indies. She broke up on 21 December. She was on a voyage from Manila to Cebu.
John	United Kingdom	The Mersey Flat foundered in the Irish Sea. Her crew were rescued. She was on a voyage from Whitehaven, Cumberland to Liverpool, Lancashire.

== 15 December ==
List of shipwrecks: 15 December 1873
Ship	State	Description
Active	United Kingdom	The schooner was wrecked on the Meadulse Skerries, in the Firth of Forth. Her crew were rescued. She was on a voyage from Leith, Lothian to Alloa, Clackmannanshire.
Alexandrine	Germany	The brig was driven ashore at Halskov, Denmark. She was on a voyage from Wismar to Hartlepool, County Durham, United Kingdom.
Arendine, or Arentina	Germany	The galiot ran into a steamship and sank off Leith. Her five crew were rescued.
Nebraska	United Kingdom	The steamship was driven ashore at South Shields, County Durham. She was refloated.
South Western	United Kingdom	The steamship was driven ashore at Ardrossan, Ayrshire. All on board were rescued. She was on a voyage from Belfast, County Antrim to Ardrossan. She was refloated on 22 December and taken in to Ardrossan.

== 16 December ==
List of shipwrecks: 16 December 1873
Ship	State	Description
Ada Berendina	Netherlands	The ship was driven ashore at Bremen, Germany.
Balaclava	United Kingdom	The schooner sprang a leak and was abandoned off Aberdeen. Her five crew were rescued by a schooner. She was on a voyage from Runcorn, Cheshire to Newcastle upon Tyne, Northumberland.
Brunswick	United Kingdom	The ship was driven ashore and wrecked at Orlock Point, County Down. She was on a voyage from Liverpool, Lancashire to Dublin.
David	Germany	The schooner was assisted in to Lowestoft, Suffolk, United Kingdom in a sinking condition. She was on a voyage from Burghead, Lothian to London, United Kingdom.
Elba	United Kingdom	The steamship foundered in the North Sea with the loss of all 32 crew. She was on a voyage from London to Hamburg, Germany.
Ernst and Julie	Germany	The ship was driven ashore at "Goos-on-Wiltow". Her crew were rescued. She was on a voyage from Newcastle upon Tyne, Northumberland, United Kingdom to Lübeck.
Frans	Norway	The brig was wrecked on Colonsay, Inner Hebrides, United Kingdom. Her crew were rescued.
Ivar	Russia	The schooner was abandoned in the North Sea. Her crew were rescued by the steamship German Empire (United Kingdom). Ivar was on a voyage from Schiedam, South Holland, Netherlands to Grimsby, Lincolnshire, United Kingdom.
John Slater	United Kingdom	The brig foundered off Corsewall Point, Wigtownshire. Her sixteen crew were rescued by the steamship Garland (United Kingdom). John Garland was on a voyage from Belfast, County Antrim to Ardrossan, Ayrshire.
Mosquito	United Kingdom	The ship sank in the River Tyne. She had been refloated by 12 January 1874 and placed under repair.
Ocean Bride	United Kingdom	The schooner was wrecked on the Swadman Reef off the coast of Northumberland. Her crew took to a boat; they were rescued two days later by a Danish schooner. She was on a voyage from Dundee, Forfarshire to Sunderland, County Durham.
Robert and Paul	Flag unknown	The ship was driven ashore at Höganäs, Sweden. Her crew were rescued. She was later refloated and was towed in to Helsingør, Denmark by the steamship Hertha (Flag unknown).
Vine	United Kingdom	The schooner was driven ashore at Fraserburgh, Aberdeenshire. She was refloated on 20 February 1874.

== 17 December ==
List of shipwrecks: 17 December 1873
Ship	State	Description
Acorn	United Kingdom	The schooner collided with the steamship Caledonia (United Kingdom) and sank in the Clyde.
Æolus	Germany	The schooner was driven ashore at Tornby, Sweden. Her crew were rescued. She was on a voyage from Antwerp, Belgium to Danzig.
Ann, and Annie Brocklebank	United Kingdom	The schooner Ann collided with Annie Brocklebank and was driven ashore at Whitehouse, County Antrim. One of the vessels had to be beached.
Lucie	Norway	The barque was wrecked near Lemvig. Her crew were rescued.
Portia	United Kingdom	The brig foundered in the North Sea. Her crew were rescued by the smack Cambria (United Kingdom). Portia was on a voyage from Helsingborg, Sweden to London.
Regina	Norway	The barque was driven ashore at Hirtshals, Denmark. Her crew were rescued. She was on a voyage from Geestemünde, Germany to Kragerø.
Urania	Germany	The steamship was wrecked off Norderney. Her crew were rescued by the Norderney Lifeboat.
William Scott Walker	United Kingdom	The schooner ran aground at North Sunderland, County Durham. She was on a voyage from the River Tyne to Montrose, Forfarshire. She was refloated and resumed her voyage, but was consequently beached at Ross, Northumberland.

== 18 December ==
List of shipwrecks: 18 December 1873
Ship	State	Description
Caroline	Denmark	The barque was wrecked at Thisted. Her crew were rescued. She was on a voyage from the Nieuwe Diep to Fredrikstad.
Drago Annetta	Italy	The ship was wrecked at Cagliari, Sardinia. She was on a voyage from Carloforte, Sardinia to Marseille, Bouches-du-Rhône, France.
Enrico	Flag unknown	The brig was wrecked at Benghazi, Ottoman Tripolitania.
Gronau	Germany	The ship foundered in the North Sea with the loss of two of her four crew. She was on a voyage from Fedderwardersiel to Leith, Lothian, United Kingdom.
Maria	Germany	The schooner foundered in the North Sea. Her crew were rescued. She was on a voyage from Burntisland, Fife, United Kingdom to Hamburg.
Nestor	United Kingdom	The steamship was driven ashore at Whitby, Yorkshire. She was refloated and towed in to Whitby but struck the quayside and developed a severe leak.
Pembroke	United Kingdom	The barque was abandoned off Hanstholm, Denmark. Her twelve crew were rescued by the steamships North Star and Rosetta (both United Kingdom). Pembroke was on a voyage from Söderhamn, Sweden to South Shields, County Durham. She subsequently came ashore at Thisted, Denmark.
Sultan	United Kingdom	The barque was wrecked on Coll, Inner Hebrides with the loss of all twelve crew. She was on a voyage from Liverpool, Lancashire to Havana, Cuba.

== 19 December ==
List of shipwrecks: 19 December 1873
Ship	State	Description
Mary Brilliard	New Zealand	The 13-ton cutter (boat) was driven ashore and wrecked on Ruapuke Island in a gale.
Mozambique	Germany	The schooner was wrecked on the Europa Rocks, off Zanzibar.
Wenvoe	United Kingdom	The steamship was wrecked at Saint-Nazaire, Ille-et-Vilaine, France. Her crew were rescued. She was on a voyage from Cardiff, Glamorgan to Saint-Nazaire.

== 20 December ==
List of shipwrecks: 20 December 1873
Ship	State	Description
Aborigine	New Zealand	The 132-ton brigantine was driven ashore and wrecked inside the mouth of the Hokitika River in a severe gale.
Ægean	United States	The ship departred from Philadelphia, Pennsylvania for Trieste. No further trace, presumed foundered with the loss of all hands.
Arcuturus	United Kingdom	The steamship heeled over and sank at Galle, Ceylon.
Carl	Sweden	The schooner ran aground off Åhus. She was later refloated and taken in to Cimbritshamn in a severely leaky condition and was placed under repair.
John and Thomas	United Kingdom	The ship struck a rock near Port Glasgow, Renfrewshire and was beached. She was on a voyage from Fraserburg, Aberdeenshire to the Clyde.
Obotvit	Russia	The steamship was wrecked at Domesnes, Courland Governorate. Her crew were rescued. She was on a voyage from Riga to Lübeck, Germany.
Redcliffe	New Zealand	The 22-ton ketch dragged her anchor and struck a reef at All Day Bay during a heavy sea. One crewman was drowned.
Skerryvore	United Kingdom	The steamship ran aground in the Clyde. She was on a voyage from Plymouth, Devon to the Clyde.
Volante	United Kingdom	The ship was driven ashore at Domesnes.
Unnamed	Flag unknown	The barque sank on the Engelbrake Sand in the North Sea off the German coast.

== 21 December ==
List of shipwrecks: 21 December 1873
Ship	State	Description
Carl	Germany	The barque capsized at Cardiff, Glamorgan, United Kingdom.
Emu	United Kingdom	The dandy was driven ashore at Bexhill-on-Sea, Sussex. She was refloated.
Marchioness of Londonderry	United Kingdom	The ship struck a floating wreck and was damaged. She was on a voyage from Whitstable, Kent to Seaham, County Durham. She was assisted in to Bridlington, Yorkshire the next day.

== 22 December ==
List of shipwrecks: 22 December 1873
Ship	State	Description
Flossie	(United Kingdom of Great Britain and Ireland) Guernsey	The brig ran aground on the Goodwin Sands, Kent. She was on a voyage from Guernsey to London. She was refloated and towed to Ramsgate, Kent.
Marquis Ross	United Kingdom	The ship was driven ashore at Løkken, Denmark. She was on a voyage from Hartlepool, County Durham to Lübeck, Germany.
Modesta	United Kingdom	The barque caught fire in the Capana River at Paraná and was scuttled.
T. A. Darrell	(United Kingdom of Great Britain and Ireland) Bermuda	The brigantine sprang a leak and was beached on the Chico Bank, in the River Plate.
Tees	United Kingdom	The steamship ran aground at the mouth of the River Tees. She was on a voyage from Antwerp, Belgium to Middlesbrough, Yorkshire.
Walo	(Russian Empire) Grand Duchy of Finland	The barque ran aground on the Cannon Rock, in Cloughty Bay. She was on a voyage from Baltimore, Maryland, United States to Londonderry, United Kingdom. She floated off on 29 December, drove ashore on Burial Island and was wrecked.
William Owen	United Kingdom	The schooner was driven ashore at Ottendorf, Germany. She was on a voyage from Hamburg, Germany to an English port.
No. 24	United Kingdom	The pilot cutter collided with the steamship Jones Brothers and foundered off Cardiff, Glamorgan.

== 23 December ==
List of shipwrecks: 23 December 1873
Ship	State	Description
Harmonie	United Kingdom	The brigantine was driven ashore on Falster, Sweden. She was on a voyage from Grangemouth, Stirlingshire to Rostock, Germany.
Patriotto	United Kingdom	The brig ran aground and sank at Shadwell, Middlesex. She was on a voyage from Hartlepool, County Durham to London.
Rio Grande	United Kingdom	The schooner was wrecked on the Burbo Bank, in Liverpool Bay. Her six crew were rescued by a gig and the tug Dandy (United Kingdom. Rio Grande was on a voyage from the Rio Grande to Liverpool, Lancashire.
Sarah	United Kingdom	The ship foundered in the Bristol Channel off Porthcawl, Glamorgan. Her crew survived.
Spey	United Kingdom	The ship foundered in the North Sea. Her crew were rescued.
Viscountess Arbuthnot	United Kingdom	The ship foundered in the North Sea 170 nautical miles (310 km) off Spurn Point, Yorkshire. Her crew were rescued by the smack Edward and Sophia (United Kingdom). She was on a voyage from Sunderland, County Durham to Leith, Lothian.

== 24 December ==
List of shipwrecks: 24 December 1873
Ship	State	Description
Adelaide	United Kingdom	The steamship ran aground at "Glenarnie" and became waterlogged. She was on a voyage from Glasgow, Renfrewshire to Glenarnie.
Emma	Germany	The brig was driven ashore at Warnemünde. She was on a voyage from Newcastle upon Tyne, Northumberland, United Kingdom to Wismar.
F. Chester	United Kingdom	The schooner ran aground on The Shingles, off the Isle of Wight. She was refloated.

== 25 December ==
List of shipwrecks: 25 December 1873
Ship	State	Description
Eureka	United Kingdom	The barque was abandoned in the North Sea. Her crew were rescued. She was on a voyage from Ghent, East Flanders, Belgium to Hull, Yorkshire.
R. P. Reynard	United States	The ship was wrecked on the Gingerbread Grounds. She was on a voyage from Boston, Massachusetts to New Orleans, Louisiana.
Thorwaldsen	United Kingdom	The ship was abandoned in the Atlantic Ocean 260 nautical miles (480 km) west of Bermuda. Her crew were rescued by Annie Torrey (United States). Thorwaldsen was on a voyage from Sapelo Island, Georgia, United States to Liverpool, Lancashire.

== 26 December ==
List of shipwrecks: 26 December 1873
Ship	State	Description
Gipsy Queen	United Kingdom	The tug ran onto the wreck of a hopper and sank in the River Tyne with the loss of eighteen of the 46 people on board.
Virginius	United States	The sidewheel paddle steamer sank in the Atlantic Ocean off Cape Hatteras, North Carolina, while under tow from the Caribbean to New York by the screw sloop-of-war USS Ossipee (United States Navy).

== 27 December ==
List of shipwrecks: 27 December 1873
Ship	State	Description
Berling	United Kingdom	The steamship was driven ashore in the Zuyder Zee. She was on a voyage from Harlingen, Friesland, Netherlands to Newcastle upon Tyne, Northumberland. She was refloated and continued her voyage, but consequently put in to Whitby, Yorkshire in a leaky condition.
Confidence	United Kingdom	The barque collided with the full-rigged ship Craigs (United Kingdom and was beached at King's Cross, Arran. She was refloated the next day with the assistance of a tug.
Tempo	Canada	The schooner was abandoned in the Atlantic Ocean. Her crew were rescued by Edith Rose (United States). Tempo was on a voyage from Sagua La Grande, Cuba to Saint John, New Brunswick.

== 28 December ==
List of shipwrecks: 28 December 1873
Ship	State	Description
Ancilla	United Kingdom	The full-rigged ship struck the South Rock, in the Belfast Lough and sank. Her crew survived. She was on a voyage from the Clyde to Trinidad.
Fulix	United Kingdom	The brig was wrecked. She was on a voyage from Cardiff, Glamorgan to Port Said, Egypt.
Goteborg	Sweden	The steamship was driven ashore at "Nedjau". She was on a voyage form Stockholm to London, United Kingdom. She was refloated the next day and assisted in to Ystad in a leaky condition.
Iron Cross	United Kingdom	The ship was driven ashore south of Dunany Point, County Louth. She was on a voyage from Liverpool, Lancashire to the Southwest Pass.
Jonas Gabrielson	Sweden	The brig was driven ashore at Snogebæk, Denmark. Her crew were rescued. She was on a voyage from Sundsvall to Liverpool.
Remembrance	United Kingdom	The brig ran aground on the Goodwin Sands, Kent. Her crew were rescued by a lifeboat. She was on a voyage from South Shields, County Durham to Dunkirk, Nord, France. She was refloated and taken in to Ramsgate, Kent in a waterlogged condition.
Vivandiere	United Kingdom	The brigantine was driven ashore on Burr Island, Connecticut, United States. She was on a voyage from Greenock, Renfrewshire to Barbados. She was refloated and resumed her voyage.
Wiggo	Sweden	The schooner was wrecked south of Cimbritshamn. Her crew were rescued.

== 29 December ==
List of shipwrecks: 29 December 1873
Ship	State	Description
Arcturus	United Kingdom	The steamship ran aground on the Gindurah Rock, off Galle, Ceylon. She was refloated but consequently sank. All on board were rescued. She was on a voyage from Calcutta, India to London.
Clio	Norway	The barque was driven ashore at Ballaugh, Isle of Man. Her twelve crew were rescued. She was on a voyage from Barrow-in-Furness, Cumberland, United Kingdom to Lisbon, Portugal.
Dryade	France	The lugger was driven ashore at Flamborough Head, Yorkshire, United Kingdom. She was on a voyage from Antwerp, Belgium to Sunderland, County Durham, United Kingdom. She was refloated and resumed her voyage.
Exile	United Kingdom	The schooner ran aground at Waterford. She was on a voyage from Newry, County Antrim to Mazagan, Morocco. She was refloated.
Gertrude	United Kingdom	The schooner sank off the Calf of Man, Isle of Man with the loss of five of the seven people on board.
Isabella	United Kingdom	The brig was wrecked off Greenore, County Wexford. Her crew were rescued.
Johanne Catherina	Germany	The ship was wrecked at Safi, Morocco.
Ocean Belle	United Kingdom	The schooner ran aground on the Spit Sand, in the Bristol Channel. She was on a voyage from Greenock, Renfrewshire to Newport, Monmouthshire. She was refloated with the assistance of a tug and towed in to Newport.
Sarah Horn	United Kingdom	The ship was wrecked in the Farne Islands, Northumberland. Her crew were rescued.
Spy	United Kingdom	The smack was abandoned in the North Sea. She was towed in to Grimsby, Lincolnshire.
Tapageur	United Kingdom	The ship was driven ashore at Swansea, Glamorgan. She was on a voyage from Madras India to Swansea.

== 30 December ==
List of shipwrecks: 30 December 1873
Ship	State	Description
Brownfield	United Kingdom	The schooner sank off Douglas Head, Isle of Man. Her five crew were rescued. She was on a voyage from Teignmouth, Devon to Runcorn, Cheshire.
Canute	United Kingdom	The ship collided with the barque Pauchita (Italy) and ran aground off Spike Island, County Cork. She was refloated.
Charles Bal	Canada	The ship ran aground at Queenstown, County Cork. She was on a voyage from Bassein, India to Queenstown. She was refloated.
Lizzy	United Kingdom	The ship was beached at Ballycrovane, County Cork. She was on a voyage from Morocco to Queenstown.
Nymphen	Norway	The barque ran aground at Waterford, United Kingdom. She was refloated and beached.
Polly	United Kingdom	The barque was abandoned in the Atlantic Ocean with the loss of nine of her crew. Survivors were rescued by Rosa B. Barbagalette (United States). Polly was on a voyage from Pensacola, Florida to Liverpool, Lancashire.
Robert Henderson	United Kingdom	The brig ran aground off Hveen, Sweden. She was on a voyage from Landskrona, Sweden to Hull, Yorkshire. She was refloated and taken in to Helsingør, Denmark.
Tetuán	Cantonalist Rebels	Third Carlist War, Cantonal rebellion: The broadside ironclad burned and sank, perhaps due to sabotage, while undergoing repairs at Cartagena.
Travancore	United Kingdom	The barque was damaged by fire at Liverpool, Lancashire.

== 31 December ==
List of shipwrecks: 31 December 1873
Ship	State	Description
Cleo	Flag unknown	The barque was driven ashore at Ballaugh, Isle of Man.
Gertrude	United Kingdom	The schooner sank off the Calf of Man, Isle of Man with the loss of three of her crew.
Kong Oscar II	Norway	The steamship ran aground off Hellevoetsluis, Zeeland, Netherlands. She was on a voyage from Riga, Russia to Amsterdam, North Holland, Netherlands. She was refloated on 3 January 1874.
Pallas	United Kingdom	The schooner capsized in the Dogger Bank. Her crew were rescued by a smack. She was on a voyage from Bremerhaven, Germany to Plymouth, Devon.
Two Friends	United Kingdom	The ship departed from London for Middlesbrough, Yorkshire. No further trace, presumed foundered with the loss of all hands.

== Unknown date ==
List of shipwrecks: Unknown date in December 1873
Ship	State	Description
Absolon	United Kingdom	The steamship ran aground at Stubben, Germany. She was refloated.
Acadia, and Arethusa	Canada; United Kingdom	Acadia collided with the barque Arethusa in Lower Cove, near Halifax, Nova Scotia. Both vessels were consequently scuttled.
Alkle	(Russian Empire) Grand Duchy of Finland.	The ship ran aground on the Gross Kahlegrundet, in the Baltic Sea. She was on a voyage from Pori to Bristol, Gloucestershire United Kingdom. She was refloated and found to be waterlogged.
Alpha	Germany	The steamship ran aground on "Carlos". She was refloated and taken in to Reval, Russia, where she arrived on 22 December in a leaky condition.
Alwine	Germany	The ship sank in the Elbe. She was on a voyage from Hamburg to Rio de Janeiro, Brazil.
Ancilla	United Kingdom	The full-rigged ship ran aground on the Cannon Rock, in Cloughty Bay and was abandoned by her crew. She was on a voyage from Glasgow, Renfrewshire to Trinidad. She subsequently sank.
Arabia	United Kingdom	The steamship foundered in the Atlantic Ocean with the loss of thirteen of her 26 crew. Survivors were rescued by Tropic (United Kingdom). Arabia was on a voyage from Calcutta, India to Boston, Lincolnshire.
Bjorg	Denmark	The schooner was driven ashore and wrecked on Skagen. Her crew were rescued. She was on a voyage from Sunderland, County Durham, United Kingdom to Bandholm.
Britannia	(Dominion of Newfoundland) Newfoundland Colony	The schooner was abandoned at sea. She was on a voyage from Tilt Cove to Saint John's. She was subsequently taken in to Catalina.
British Lion	United Kingdom	The ship was driven ashore on "Wolfs Island", Nova Scotia, Canada.
Canessa Madre	Flag unknown	The ship was driven ashore at the mouth of the Shark River. She was on a voyage from London, United Kingdom to New York, United States.
Carl Steinorth	Germany	The barque was wrecked at the mouth of the Elbe. Her crew were rescued by the Cuxhaven Lifeboat. She was on a voyage from Hamburg to Rio de Janeiro.
Cassini	United Kingdom	The steamship ran aground at "Teke". She was on a voyage from Liverpool, Lancashire to Galaţi, Ottoman Empire She was refloated on 19 December and resumed her voyage.
Cerdic	United Kingdom	The steamship was driven ashore on Perim, Aden Governorate. She was on a voyage from Bombay, India to Liverpool. She was later refloated with assistance from the steamship Kwangtung (United Kingdom).
Christine Brockleman	Germany	The barque was driven ashore on Læsø, Denmark. She was on a voyage from Hull, Yorkshire to Copenhagen, Denmark. She subsequently broke up.
Clutha	United Kingdom	The steamship was driven ashore at Broadness Point. She was later refloated and resumed her voyage.
Comet	United Kingdom	The ship was driven ashore at "Davis Point". She was on a voyage from Prince Edward Island, Canada to a British port.
Cornwall	United Kingdom	The ship was wrecked on the Ajax Reef. She was on a voyage from Belize City, British Honduras to London.
Ebenezer	Norway	The schooner was abandoned off "Wadero".
Eftichia	Ottoman Empire	The barque ran aground in the Sea of Marmara.
Elizabeth Cann	United Kingdom	The ship was abandoned in the Atlantic Ocean. She on a voyage from Miramichi, New Brunswick, Canada to Belfast, County Antrim.
Far West	United Kingdom	The schooner was wrecked at Louisbourg, Nova Scotia.
Fortuna	Spain	The brig was wrecked near Cape Spartel, Morocco. She was on a voyage from Buenos Aires Argentina to Barcelona.
Franz Ludwig	Germany	The ship was driven ashore. She was refloated and taken in to Stolpemünde.
Ganger Rolf	Norway	The ship was driven ashore at Sandefjord. She was on a voyage from Cherbourg, Seine-Inférieure to Sandefjord.
Ghiorgios	Greece	The ship was wrecked at Bourgas, Ottoman Empire.
Giovanni Battista	Italy	The brig was driven ashore near Lusinpicolo, Austria-Hungary. She was later refloated.
Isabella	United Kingdom	The brig was driven ashore and wrecked near Greenore Point, County Wexford. Her crew were rescued. She was on a voyage from Troon, Ayrshire to Waterford.
Jane Henry	United Kingdom	The ship was driven ashore at Cape Henry, Virginia, United States. She was on a voyage from Dublin to Providence, British Guiana.
Janet Forbes	United Kingdom	The ship was driven ashore at "Davis Point". She was on a voyage from Prince Edward Island, Canada to a British port.
Jerome	United Kingdom	The schooner was driven ashore near Ayr. She was refloated on 26 December and taken in to Ayr in a sinking condition.
Jeune Leonie	France	The lugger was driven ashore and sank at Nieuwpoort, West Flanders, Belgium. Her crew were rescued.
John	United Kingdom	The ship was driven ashore. She was on a voyage from Riga to a British port. She was refloated and taken in to Visby, Sweden, where she was condemned.
Juan Emilio	Spain	The brig was wrecked east of Nuevitas, Captaincy General of Cuba. She was on a voyage from Cuba to Liverpool.
Kelice	United Kingdom	The steamship collided with the steamships Ajax and Holmside (both United Kingdom and was beached.
Lady Havelock	United Kingdom	The steamship ran aground on the Corton Sand, in the North Sea off the coast of Suffolk. She was refloated and taken in to Great Yarmouth, Norfolk.
Lalour	United Kingdom	The ship was wrecked at Louisbourg. She was on a voyage from an Irish port to Glace Bay, Nova Scotia.
Leander	United States	The derelict ship was towed in to Sisal, Mexico. She was on a voyage from Buenos Aires to Pensacola, Florida.
Lehaute	Spain	The brig collided with the barque Constantia (Spain) and sank at New Orleans, Louisiana, United States.
Maria	Flag unknown	The crewless schooner drove ashore on Juist, Germany.
Maria Rividi	Flag unknown	The ship was wrecked at the entrance to the Black Sea.
Marie	Sweden	The ship was driven ashore on Gotland. She was refloated and towed in to Stockholm.
Martha Cobb	United Kingdom	The ship ran aground on the South Breaker. She was on a voyage from Galway to New York.
Mary	Germany	The ship was driven ashore on Skagen, Denmark. She was on a voyage from Africa to Flensburg. She broke up on 5 December.
Mary Rice	United States	The ship was driven ashore at Cape Henry, Virginia on or before 22 December. She was on a voyage from Rio de Janeiro to Baltimore, Maryland.
Mary Spencer	United Kingdom	The ship ran aground on the Kentish Knock. She was on a voyage from Newcastle upon Tyne, Northumberland to Livorno, Italy. She was refloated and put back to Newcastle upon Tyne in a leaky condition.
Matchless	United Kingdom	The schooner ran aground at Larache, Morocco before 11 December. She was on a voyage from Larache to an English port. She was declared a total loss.
Michelino	Flag unknown	The ship ran aground in the Hudson River.
Moyune	China	The steamship was destroyed by fire at Shanghai.
Neptun	Denmark	The steamship caught fire at Reval and was severely damaged. she was on a voyage from Reval to Lübeck, Germany.
Ocean Wave	United Kingdom	The ship was driven ashore at Poplar Point. She was refloated and towed in to Montreal, Quebec, Canada in a leaky condition.
Polly and Emily	United Kingdom	The ship sank off Sully Island, Glamorgan. She was later raised and taken in to Penarth, Glamorgan.
Remo	Italy	The ship was lost whilst on a voyage from Marseille, Bouches-du-Rhône, France to New Orleans.
Rimac	Russia	The ship ran aground on the Merse Reef, in the Baltic Sea between 20 and 23 December. She was refloated and taken in to Riga.
Sadney	Sweden	The ship ran aground at Marstrand. She was on a voyage from Gävle to an English port.
Saint Severe	United Kingdom	The ship was wrecked at Progresso. She was on a voyage from Marseille to "Lagoon".
Saxon	United Kingdom	The barque was wrecked in the Orkney Islands with the loss of all fourteen crew.
Sir George Grey	United Kingdom	The tugboat exploded and sank in the River Mersey off Waterloo, Lancashire with the loss of a crew member.
Stephens	United Kingdom	The sloop ran aground and sank in the River Ouse between Goole and Selby, Yorkshire. She was on a voyage from Saint Andrews, Fife to Selby.
St. Helens	United Kingdom	The steamship was presumed to have exploded and sank in the North Sea with the loss of all 21 crew. She was on a voyage from South Shields to London.
Stork	United Kingdom	The steamship was driven ashore at Flamborough Head, Yorkshire. She was on a voyage from London to Granton, Lothian. She was refloated.
St. Peter	United Kingdom	The barque ran aground in the Kattegat. She was on a voyage from Westervik, Sweden to Hartlepool, County Durham. She was refloated and taken in to Copenhagen in a leaky condition.
Stradella	Germany	The ship was wrecked at Lemvig, Norway with some loss of life. She was on a voyage from Nantes, Loire-Inférieure to Christiania, Norway.
Sytende Mai	Norway	The barque was abandoned in the Atlantic Ocean west of Ireland before 25 December.
Texas	United Kingdom	The steamship ran aground on the Stonewall Shoal. She was on a voyage from Liverpool to New Orleans, Louisiana, United States. She was refloated and taken in to Port Royal, Jamaica.
Titania	United Kingdom	The ship was driven ashore at "Lusure". She was on a voyage from Cephalonia, Greece to Antwerp, Belgium.
Triton	United Kingdom	The brig was driven ashore "below Bosch".
Ulisse	Italy	The brig collided with the steamship Lufra (Flag unknown) and sank. Her crew were rescued. Ulisse was on a voyage from Galaţi, Ottoman Empire to Genoa.
Uniao	Portugal	The ship was abandoned at sea. She was on a voyage from Pernambuco, Brazil to Porto.
Union	United Kingdom	The ship was wrecked on the Horn Reef, in the North Sea. Her crew were rescued. She was on a voyage from Plymouth, Devon to Harburg, Germany.
Vallhall	Sweden	The steamship was driven ashore near Thisted. Her crew were rescued. She was on a voyage from Liverpool to Gothenburg. She was declared a total loss.
Willie Coe	Canada	The schooner was destroyed by fire in the Atlantic Ocean before 30 December.
W. R. Rickett	United Kingdom	The steamship was driven ashore at Constantinople Ottoman Empire. She was refloated.
Unnamed	Flag unknown	A full-rigged ship was wrecked on the Seven Stones Reef, between the Isles of Scilly and Cornwall.
