= Limbo of the Lost =

2008 video game

- Developer: Majestic Studios
- Publishers: EU: G2 Games; NA: Tri Synergy
- Designers: Tim Croucher; Laurence Francis
- Programmer: Steve Bovis
- Artist: Steve Bovis
- Composers: Laurence Francis, Marko Hautamäki
- Engine: Wintermute Engine
- Platform: Microsoft Windows
- Release: EU: 29 February 2008; RU: 14 March 2008; NA: 2 June 2008
- Genre: Graphic adventure
- Mode: Single-player

Limbo of the Lost is a 2008 point-and-click adventure game developed by Majestic Studios for the PC. The game follows Benjamin Briggs, the real-life captain of the Mary Celeste, as he explores Limbo. Players act as an omnipresent guide for Briggs during his adventure.

Development on Limbo of the Lost began in the early 1990s as a graphical text adventure for the Atari ST and Amiga 500. Due to lessening demand of these platforms, the game was initially shelved, but later redeveloped for the PC during the 2000s. A few days after its North American release in 2008, Limbo of the Lost was withdrawn from sale when it was discovered the game plagiarized content from other titles.

== Gameplay ==
Limbo of the Lost is a point-and-click graphic adventure game. Players direct the controllable character around the game world by clicking with the computer mouse to interact with objects and characters in the game world.

== Plot ==
Limbo of the Lost follows Benjamin Briggs, the historic captain of the Mary Celeste. In 1872, the Mary Celeste was discovered empty; the fate of Briggs and the rest of the crew remains a mystery. The game puts Briggs in Limbo, where he has to aid Destiny in a war against Fate.

Captain Briggs is portrayed as entomophobic, having a fear of insects. Throughout the game, he must confront his fear in order to complete puzzles and progress further. The existence of the player is acknowledged by the game's characters (described as a "spirit guide"), and during the final sequence the player, rather than Briggs, becomes the puzzle-solving protagonist. Briggs complains to the player from time to time regarding his feelings of the surroundings and what he has been asked to do. If the player does not move the mouse for a period of time, Briggs will let the player know about it.

The game ends with the characters throwing a surprise party for Briggs, declaring him "King of Limbo", and performing a doo-wop/Tin Pan Alley styled musical number praising him, in which he joins.

== Development ==
In the early 1990s, Steve Bovis and Tim Croucher developed the initial idea for the game, Limbo of the Lost. Bovis and Croucher created a demo of a graphical text adventure game for the Atari ST. The duo showed the demo to publishers, who were interested only if the game was finished. After unsuccessfully trying to expand the development team, the pair shelved the project because publishers were no longer interested in making games for the Atari ST. In 1995, Bovis, Croucher and new team member Laurence Francis began working on the game again, this time as a point-and-click adventure for the Amiga 500. Grandslam Entertainment-owned publisher Rasputin Software agreed to publish the game, and Limbo of the Lost was ported to the Amiga 1200 and Amiga CD32. Limbo of the Lost was never published, since demand had fallen for games for the Amiga 1200 and CD32.

In 2003, after learning PC and 3D development tools, Bovis returned to Limbo of the Lost. With Croucher and Francis, he redesigned the game, keeping only the concept and certain character designs from the original game. The partners arranged publication of the game in Europe in late 2007 by G2 Games. In 2008, Tri Synergy announced it would give Limbo of the Lost widespread release in North America. By June 2008, copies of the release could be found only on eBay and at a small Asian retailer.

== Plagiarism ==
On 11 June 2008, GamePlasma posted an article showing certain places in Limbo of the Lost were identical to the game The Elder Scrolls IV: Oblivion.

After this revelation, other investigations into the game discovered environments and assets taken from numerous other games, including Sea Dogs and World of Warcraft.

Certain places in Limbo of the Lost also resembled portions of Thief: Deadly Shadows. The game depicts its lead character walking near the gates of "Famine", "Drought" and "Disease", which is identical to Thief's "Keeper Library".

On 12 June 2008, publisher Tri Synergy announced they had stopped distribution of Limbo of the Lost while investigating allegations of plagiarism. Tri Synergy said they had no knowledge Majestic Studios used other games' work without permission and said they had contacted Majestic Studios for a response.

On 24 June 2008, Majestic Studios were quoted as saying:

In response to the shocking notification that some alleged unauthorized copyrighted materials submitted by sources external to the development team have been found within the PC game Limbo of the Lost, we [the development team] have given our consent and full cooperation to both publishers who are recalling all units from all territories immediately. [...] To the best of our knowledge, no one at Majestic, [European publisher] G2Games or [North American publisher] Tri Synergy, Inc. knew about this infringement and knowingly played any part in it.

On 30 July 2008, Tim Croucher and Laurence Francis announced their departure from Majestic Studios with the following statement:

Due to the behaviour of certain members of the Majestic Studios team, Mr. T. Croucher and Mr. L. Francis would like to announce their departure from Majestic Studios; and would like it known that they have severed all connections, ties and links with the remaining members of the Majestic team.

Mr. Croucher would like it known that his input responsibility for Limbo of the Lost was: research, some vocal acting and puzzle design.

Mr. Francis would like it known that his input responsibility for Limbo of the Lost was: original opening theme and intro music, character scriptwriting for Darkmere, puzzle design and voice acting, particularly that of B. S. Briggs.

Neither Mr. Croucher nor Mr. Francis had any say or control over: graphics, rendering, coding or game screen design.

As far as both Mr. Croucher and Mr. Francis were aware, all submitted material was to be original; both Mr. Croucher and Mr. Francis adhered to this contractual clause.

In a 2011 interview with Swedish magazine Fienden, both Croucher and Francis blamed Bovis for the game's failure, as the plagiarism completely blindsided them. Both maintained that they had no idea Bovis would do such a thing and described him as "power-mad, so obsessed with being in control and with the Limbo of the Lost being his that he tried to play his friends off against each other". Ultimately, Croucher and Francis ended their relationship with Bovis.

== Reception ==
The game received extremely negative reviews, according to the Metacritic website.

In 2010, UGO included the game in the article "The 11 Weirdest Game Endings", commenting: "One thing that sure as hell wasn't stolen was the game's batcrap crazy ending, which must be seen to be believed."

== Community projects ==
In December 2025, Limbo of the Lost: Enhanced Edition was released. It is a community-made version of the game that addresses a number of issues and adds new features.
