= J. Habakuk Jephson's Statement =

1884 short story by Arthur Conan Doyle

- Short story by Arthur Conan Doyle
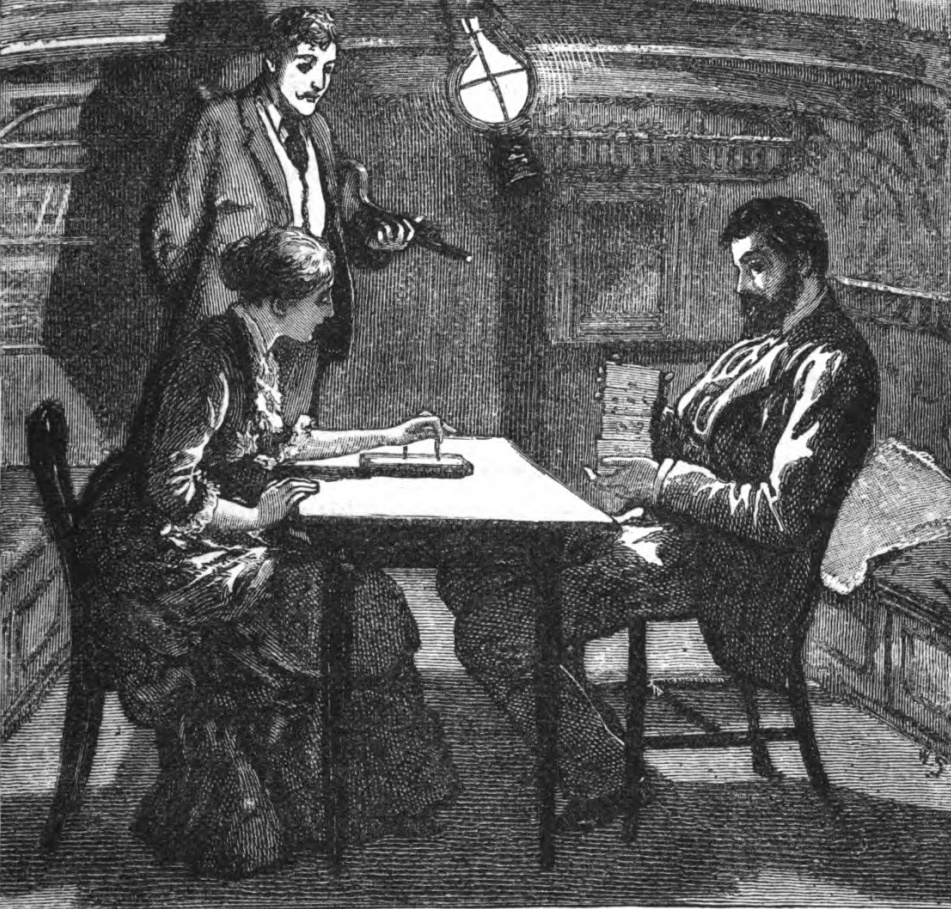
- Illustration by William Small from the first publication of the story in The Cornhill Magazine, January 1884.

Text available at Wikisource
- Country: United Kingdom
- Language: English
- Genre: Short story

Publication
- Published in: The Cornhill Magazine
- Media type: Print, magazine
- Publication date: January 1884

"J. Habakuk Jephson's Statement" is an 1884 short story by Arthur Conan Doyle. It is in the form of a first-person testimony by a survivor of the Marie Celeste, a fictionalised version of the Mary Celeste, a ship found mysteriously abandoned and adrift in the Atlantic Ocean in 1872. Doyle's story was published anonymously in the January 1884 issue of The Cornhill Magazine.

== Influence ==
The story popularised the mystery of the Mary Celeste. Doyle drew heavily on the original incident, but some of the fictional elements that he introduced have come to replace the real events in the popular imagination. Doyle changes a number of details, including the names of the captain, crew, and passengers, and also the name of the vessel, from Mary Celeste to Marie Celeste. In the story, the ship is in an almost perfect state when discovered, and the lifeboats are still present, whereas the Mary Celeste had been in heavy weather and was waterlogged, and her one boat was missing.

The fictional story reached a much wider audience than the original story of the Mary Celeste, which has led to the widespread belief that Marie Celeste was the name of the real ship. The change to the ship's name possibly was accidental, since Doyle did not change the name of the Dei Gratia, the ship that salvaged the Mary Celeste.

== Synopsis ==
The protagonist, Jephson, is an American doctor. He explains that he was wounded while fighting for the Union during the American Civil War and was nursed back to health by an elderly Black woman, who was aware of his abolitionist work before the war. As a way of thanks, she gave him a small, carved, black stone, which she claimed was a lucky charm that had been in her family for many generations, and that it would keep him from harm.

Eleven years later, Jephson develops a severe cough and is advised by a specialist to visit Europe, where the clear air might cure him. In Boston, he books passage to Lisbon on the merchant ship Marie Celeste. Seven crew and three passengers (Jephson, an accountant named Harton, and a man of mixed race named Septimius Goring), as well as the captain's wife and child, are listed on the ship's manifest.

The account then takes the form of Jephson's diary.

As the ship prepares to depart, two experienced crew members fail to return from shore leave, and the captain has to recruit two Black sailors who happen to be on the quay to replace them. Jephson notes that the ship's cook is Black, and that Goring employs a Black servant who is not listed on the manifest.

Six days into the voyage, the captain's family disappears without a trace. The following day, the captain is found dead of a gunshot wound, which Jephson suspects was an act of suicide. His first mate, Hyson, takes charge as the new captain. These tragedies are followed by a series of unusual incidents, and Jephson and Harton become increasingly suspicious of Goring. Goring and the two Black sailors learn of Jephson's lucky charm and take a great interest in it.

Eventually, the ship approaches land. Jephson, Harton, and Hyson expect it to be the coast of Portugal, but soon realise that they have instead travelled to the coast of Africa. Hyson believes his navigational instruments have been tampered with and decides to turn around and sail north to Lisbon. When night falls, Goring, his servant, the cook, and the two Black crewmen seize Jephson and tie him up, having already killed Harton. After Goring sends signals to the shore, a large canoe manned by Black Africans approaches the ship. They climb aboard and overpower the remaining crew members.

Then, further discussion occurs of the stone that Jephson is carrying, after which Goring tells Jephson that his life will be spared because the Africans believe the stone to have magical powers. While Jephson is taken ashore, the rest of the white crew are murdered, and their bodies dumped into the sea. The ship - the Marie Celeste - is left to drift out to sea, where it is eventually discovered by another merchantman, the Dei Gratia.

Jephson is taken to a temple, where the lucky charm is revealed to be an ear from a giant stone idol. This causes the Africans to worship Jephson as the bearer of the missing ear, and he is treated with reverence, although he clearly remains a prisoner. During the night, he is visited by Goring, who explains the history and significance of the statue and the stone ear. He also tells Jephson that he has a hatred of the white race, and in revenge for the ill treatment of himself and his family by white slave owners, he carried out a series of murders of white people in the United States. He explains that on the Marie Celeste, he killed the captain and the captain's wife and child, and tampered with the navigation instruments so that Hyson would unwittingly steer for Africa. Now, he finds he cannot bear the presence of white people and intends to become the head of the tribe of Africans, whom he considers to have a purity he cannot find anywhere else. The passengers and crew of the Marie Celeste were to be his last victims, but the stone ear complicated matters.

Goring then announces that he has come to help Jephson escape. Jephson has become a rival for the tribe's devotion, and stands in the way of Goring becoming the chief. Goring would like to kill Jephson, but that would antagonise the tribe. The safe alternative is to help Jephson escape and have the tribe believe that he has returned to heaven. The condition is that Jephson reveal Goring to be the mass murderer who outwitted the white race for 20 years.

Goring provides a boat in which Jephson is pushed out to sea by the two Black crewmen from the Marie Celeste. After a few days, Jephson is picked up by a passing steamer and returns to his home and family.

== Publication ==
The story was first printed anonymously in The Cornhill Magazine in January 1884 under the title "J. Habakuk Jephson's Statement", illustrated by William Small. It has been reprinted a number of times. The Boston Herald reprinted it on 3 April 1885, and it was anthologised in Dreamland and Ghostland (1887), The Captain of the Polestar and Other Tales (1890) and Tales of Pirates and Blue Water (1922).

== Reception ==
The story was first published anonymously, and one reviewer attributed it to Robert Louis Stevenson, while critics compared it to Edgar Allan Poe's work. Though fiction, it was presented as an eyewitness account of the end met by those on the mysterious "ghost ship". Much to Doyle's astonishment, some mistook the story to be a true account, including the Boston Herald, which reprinted the tale.

== See also ==
- Abel Fosdyk papers
