= Gealtacht Mael Mórdha =

Studio album by Mael Mórdha
- Released: 19 March 2007
- Genre: Celtic metal, doom metal
- Length: 44:42
- Label: Grau Records

Mael Mórdha chronology
Cluain Tarbh (2005)	Gealtacht Mael Mórdha (2007)	Manannán (2010)

Gealtacht Mael Mórdha is the second full-length studio album by the Celtic doom metal band Mael Mórdha.

== Track listing ==
1. "Atlas of Sorrow" – 10:37
2. "Godless Commune of Sodom" – 6:01
3. "A Window of Madness" – 5:50
4. "Curse of the Bard" – 4:47
5. "The Struggle Eternal" – 7:22
6. "Gealtacht Mael Mórdha" – 5:23
7. "Minions of Manannan" – 4:32

== Personnel ==
- Roibéard Ó Bogail – Vocals, piano, whistle
- Gerry Clince – Guitars
- Anthony Lindsay – Guitars
- Dave Murphy – Bass
- Shane Cahill – Drums
