= Abel Fosdyk papers =

Apocryphal account of the Mary Celeste

The Abel Fosdyk papers (or "Abel Fosdyk's Story") is an apocryphal explanation of the fate of the Mary Celeste, which was presented on its original publication in 1913 as true but which is most likely a literary hoax.

== Publication ==
In 1913, the highly successful monthly fiction magazine the Strand Magazine invited its contributors and readers to suggest possible solutions to the mystery of the Mary Celeste. Among the many responses was an account from an apparently impeccable source which claimed to be true. A letter from Mr. A. Howard Linford MA, of Magdalen College, Oxford, the headmaster of Peterborough Lodge, Hampstead's largest prep school, claimed to have found an account of the Mary Celeste among papers given to him by an old servant, Abel Fosdyk, on his deathbed. In addition to Fosdyk's supposed manuscript, Linford included as support a photograph of a little girl plus some drawings made by Linford's son. The account appeared in the November 1913 edition of The Strand Magazine under the title "Abel Fosdyk's Story".

== Fosdyk's account ==
Fosdyk's papers say that he had to leave the United States quickly due to some misfortunes, and being a friend to Captain Benjamin Briggs, he convinced the captain to allow him on board. While at sea, Captain Briggs had a carpenter build a high special deck on the quarterdeck for his young daughter and wife, that would allow them a better view while at sea.

According to Fosdyk's account, which is set down in the manner of a diary, one day Captain Briggs engaged in a lighthearted dispute with the mate about how well a man could swim with his clothes on. Captain Briggs and the mate then exchanged clothes, jumped overboard, and began swimming around the vessel. Captain Briggs's wife and child, Fosdyk, and some other members of the crew stepped up onto the specially built deck for a better view of the fun.

Suddenly, one swimming crew member screamed in agony. Looking around, they saw that he was being attacked by a shark, and he quickly disappeared under the water. The remaining members of the crew also ran up onto the specially built deck to better see what was happening, and it promptly collapsed, tossing them all into the sea and leaving no one on board the Mary Celeste.

What followed, by Fosdyk's account, was a splashing confusion, with sharks attacking all those in the water, with the exception of Fosdyk, who by accident had landed on top of the shattered piece of deck. The Mary Celeste floated away from their location and by the time the shark attack was over, Fosdyk was the only survivor, and he was unable to reach the ship. He floated for several days, thirsting for water and suffering from exposure, finally washing ashore on the coast of Africa. Fearful of retribution due to the outlandish details of his story, he never revealed the incident to anyone. It only came to light after his death because Linford went public with it.

== Debunking ==
- While Fosdyk claims to have been one of the Mary Celeste's company, none of the names in his account appear on the official records.
- Fosdyk says that the Mary Celeste was a ship of 600 tons, when in fact it was less than a third of that.
- Fosdyk's writings also say that the crew were English, when in fact they were mostly German and American: this detail would be very unlikely to have been overlooked given that Fosdyk would have had a daily interaction with the entire crew (of which there were only seven).
- Fosdyk's story fails to explain the missing boat, papers and navigation instruments.
- There was no evidence that a special deck was ever built on the Mary Celeste, let alone that it collapsed.

== See also ==
- J. Habakuk Jephson's Statement
