= One Lonely Path =

Studio album by Longing for Dawn
- Released: February 2005
- Recorded: May–August 2004
- Studio: P.R.I.M. and Cyclic Law Headquarters in Montreal, Canada
- Genre: Funeral doom, death metal
- Length: 53:44
- Label: Twilight Foundation

Longing for Dawn chronology
One Lonely Path (2005)	A Treacherous Ascension (2007)

One Lonely Path is the debut album by Canadian funeral doom band Longing for Dawn. It was released through Twilight Foundation, which is a sister label of a label that is owned by Longing for Dawn's guitarist Frédéric Arbour, Cyclic Law Records. The first edition came in 1,000 copies worth of middlemount six-panel digipaks.

== Track listing ==
All music by Frédéric Arbour. All lyrics by Stefan Laroche.

1. "Access to Deliverance" – 10:22
2. "Lethal" – 13:07
3. "Total Absence of Light" – 11:31
4. "Ashes of Innocence" – 13:54
5. "One Lonely Path" – 4:48

== Personnel ==
- Frédéric Arbour - lead guitar, acoustic guitar, sound manipulations, artwork, mastering, engineering
- Stefan Laroche - vocals, artwork
- Stian Weideborg - rhythm guitar
- Étienne Lepage - bass guitar
- Sylvian Marquette - drums
- Kevin Jones - bass guitar
- Martin Gagnon - drums
- Jean-Simon Rancourt - engineering
- Pierre Rémillard - mixing
- Virginie Turcotte - photography
