= Mandrake (German band) =

German gothic metal band

- Origin: Emden, Germany
- Genres: Gothic metal, death metal, doom metal
- Years active: 1996–present
- Members: Lutz de Putter; Birgit Lau; Garvin Bösch; Julius Martinek
- Past members: Henni Franzbecker; Jörg Röttger; Bernd Ammermann
- Website: www.mandrake.de

Mandrake is a German gothic metal band from Emden, Ostfriesland, formed by Lutz de Putter in 1996.

== History ==
Lutz de Putter founded Mandrake in 1996. The band's name derives from the Latin name of the Mandragora officinarum mandrake, which are said to give eternal life. The band recorded their first demo Mandragora Officialis in 1997. Their debut album Forever came out in 1998 and was produced with the help of some guest musicians. Birgit Lau joined the band in 1999 as a background singer, slowly getting more and more share of the vocals. Being unsigned, after various line-ups, the band recorded a promo titled Entwine in 2002. The following year, Mandrake signed a contract with the German independent label Prophecy Productions and released Calm the Seas, followed by The Balance of Blue (2005) and Mary Celeste (2007). All the lyrics and music were written by Lutz de Putter and Jörg Uken.

== Style and reviews ==
Mandrake's second album Calm the Seas received a positive review from the German Sonic Seducer magazine, noting a mix of powerful, sometimes brutal Death Metal, gothic sounds and minimalistic electronical music. The band was compared to the early Theatre of Tragedy sound and to The Gathering and Moonspell.

The Balance of Blue was reviewed as an improvement compared to the previous release. The band had grown and now played dark, emotional Gothic Rock with a distinct identity. The guitar parts and string arrangements were lauded as very powerful.

The fourth album Mary Celeste references the 19th century abandoned ship of the same name. It features epic, energetic and partially fragile Gothic Metal.

The fifth album Innocence Weakness has a topic shift in the lyrics of its songs. Instead of writing songs about the sea or water, Lutz focused more on the topic of inner loneliness.

Lutz de Putter describes Mandrake's style as Gothic metal with elements from electronic music. Lutz has often stated in interviews that he does not like the German language, which explains why all their songs are in English. Lutz has also stated that Mandrake's music is influenced by such bands as Kreator, Lake of Tears, Katatonia, My Dying Bride, Skepticism, Hypocrisy, Bathory, Dead Can Dance, Mourning Beloveth, Decoryah, Let Me Dream, On Thorns I Lay, Rotting Christ, The Cure, Sisters of Mercy, Die Form, Tiamat, Alas, The Vision Bleak, Sopor Aeturnus, Diary of Dreams, The Gathering and Deinonychus.

== Side projects ==
Aside from Mandrake, Lutz writes songs for the black metal band Von Branden. He also started working as a teacher. Garvin Bösch also plays in the nu-metal band Nayled. Julius Martinek plays in Noiseome Paste. Jörg Röttger plays drums in the German death metal band Weak Aside.

== Discography ==
=== Studio albums ===
- Forever, DynaLex/Self-Production (1998)
- Calm The Seas, GreyFall/Prophecy Productions (2003)
- The Balance of Blue, GreyFall/Prophecy Productions (2005)
- Mary Celeste, GreyFall/Prophecy Productions (2007)
- Innocence Weakness, Promedia (Soulfood Music) (2010)
