= Grau Records =

- Genre: Death/doom metal, folk metal, funeral doom metal, gothic metal, death metal
- Country of origin: Germany
- Official website: www.grau.cd

Grau Records is a record label based in Germany. The label specializes in underground metal music.

== Bands ==
=== Current bands ===
- Fall of Empyrean
- Longing for Dawn
- Mael Mórdha
- Mandrake
- Mourning Beloveth

=== Former bands ===
- Agalloch
- The Blue Season
- Gardens of Gehenna
- Keen of the Crow
- Saturnus
- Von Branden
