= Cluain Tarbh =

Studio album by Mael Mórdha
- Released: September 2005
- Recorded: 2005, Dublin
- Genre: Doom metal, Celtic metal
- Length: 46:50
- Label: Karmageddon Media
- Producer: Mael Mórdha and Mick Richards

Mael Mórdha chronology
Cluain Tarbh EP (2003)	Cluain Tarbh (2005)	Gaeltacht Mael Mórdha (2007)

Cluain Tarbh is also the name of an Irish town from which the album takes its name.

Cluain Tarbh (Irish for Meadow of Bulls) is the Irish Celtic metal band Mael Mórdha's debut studio album. It was released in September 2005. The album name, along with the band name, can be written as the cover suggests, using Traditional Irish typography. The name would then be, "Cluain Tarḃ."

The album contains eight tracks, the shortest being An Tús at 0:56 long, and the longest being I Am the Wench's Bane at 10:15 long. The album is a collection of popular and newly written material spanning several years in the band's history.

The cover art depicts the Battle of Clontarf or Cath Chluain Tarbh and this is the primary theme of the album's art and title track. The man on the left is a native Irish Gael, presumably fighting on the side of Brian Bóruma mac Cennétig, High King of Ireland. The man on the right appears to be a Viking, fighting on the side of the King of Leinster, Mael Mórdha mac Murchada. Both men are engaged in one-on-one combat against one another.

The album contains lyrics in both English and Irish.

== Track listing ==
1. "An Tús" (The Beginning) – 0:56
2. "Winds of One Thousand Winters" – 5:51
3. "The Serpent and the Black Lake" – 6:55
4. "Cluain Tarbh" (Meadow of Bulls) – 6:45
5. "I Am the Wench's Bane" – 10:15
6. "The Man All Hate to Love" – 4:21
7. "Pauper of Souls" – 5:02
8. "Realms of Insanity" – 6:41

== Song information ==
=== An Tús ===
"An Tús" is the introduction to the album. It fades in (and out) and is what sounds like a war tune with pipes. This is possibly mimicking what could be the lead-up the Battle of Clontarf, used as a metaphor for the entire album.

=== Winds of One Thousand Winters ===
This song is the beginning of Mael Mórdha's signature Ceol Breatha Gaelach on the album. This is one of the sample tracks which can be heard on their website. As explained by the band:

A complex mix of orchestration, layered guitars and drums, this tune expresses the misery felt by the ignorance expressed towards our past and the hope of a time when a king will rise to unite the clanns and revive our dying culture. The music is more textured than Cluain Tarbh as the theme deals with more subtle, deeper feelings.

Composed: 2003

=== The Serpent and the Black Lake ===
This song is stated by the band to be about the "Lure of Love".

Composed: 1997

=== Cluain Tarbh ===
The title track. This song tells the story of the Battle of Clontarf and can be considered the centrepiece of the album.

From the band's website: This is about the lead up and aftermath of that most famous of battles fought in the Meadow of Bulls (Cluain Tarbh - Clontarf) on Good Friday 1014 between the then high king of Éire, Brian Boru and the king of Leinster, Mael Mórdha. The pace is fast and furious (for Mael Mórdha I mean) with pounding guitars and drums, whistle and bellowing vocals.

Composed: 2003

=== I Am the Wench's Bane ===
This is the longest song on the album. It is said to be "on the relationship between the Wench and Her Bane".

Composed: 2001

=== The Man All Hate to Love ===
From the band's website: If Cluain Tarbh is fast then this song is misery incarnate. Slow with lots of backing vocals, orchestration and miserable guitars. The title pretty much explains the theme of this little ditty. If you ever feel down listening to this song will make you realise that nothing could be as terrible as what is expressed here.

Composed: 2003

=== Pauper of Souls ===
This song is stated to be about "the merits of belief over non-belief".

Composed: 2001

=== Realms of Insanity ===
This song is apparently "open to interpretation". No further information is given.

Composed: 1996
