= Longing for Dawn =

Canadian funeral doom metal band

- Origin: Montreal, Quebec, Canada
- Genres: Funeral doom metal
- Years active: 2002–2011 (indefinite hiatus)
- Labels: Grau Records, Twilight Foundation
- Members: Frederic Arbour; Stefan Laroche; Simon Carignan; Etienne Lepage; Francois C. Fortin
- Past members: Stian Weideborg; Sylvian Marquette
- Website: longingfordawn.ca

Longing for Dawn is a Canadian funeral doom metal band based in Montreal signed to Grau Records. The band has released three albums, the most recent of which is Between Elation and Despair, which was released in March 2009.

== Band members ==
=== Current ===
- Frederic Arbour – lead guitar, sound manipulation
- Stefan Laroche – vocals
- Simon Carignan – rhythm guitar
- Etienne Lepage – bass guitar
- Francois C. Fortin – drums

=== Former ===
- Stian Weideborg – rhythm guitar
- Sylvain Marquette – drums
- Martin Gagnon – drums

== Discography ==
- One Lonely Path (album, 2005, Twilight Foundation)
- A Treacherous Ascension (album, 2007, Grau Records)
- Between Elation and Despair (album, 2009, Grau Records)
