= Mael Mórdha =

Irish metal band

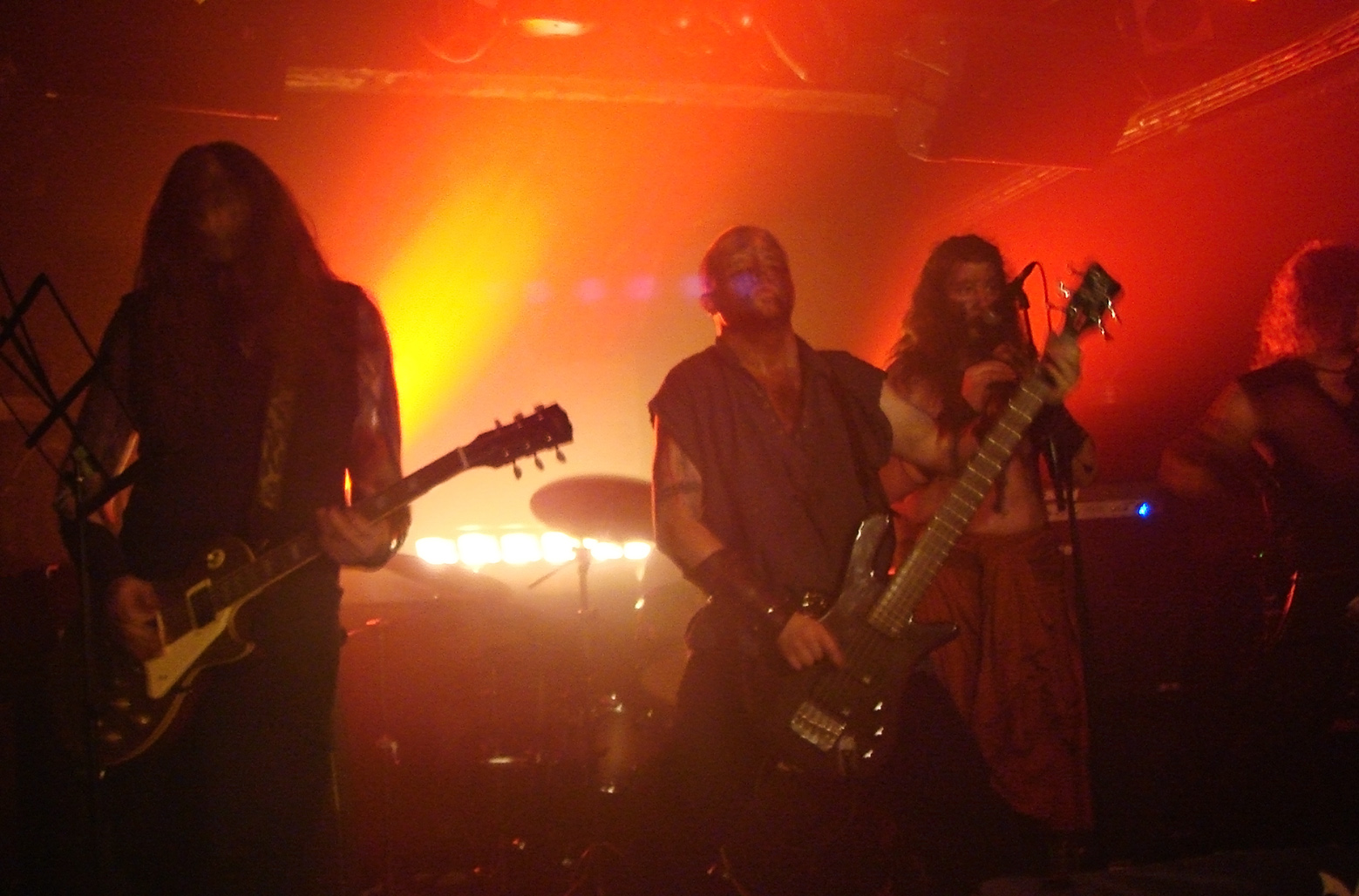
- Mael Mórdha in 2008

Background information
- Origin: Dublin, Ireland
- Genres: Doom metal, Celtic metal
- Years active: 1998–2015, 2018
- Labels: Candlelight, Grau, Karmageddon, Deasmumhan
- Members: Stíofáin De Roiste; Gerry Clince; Dave Murphy; Shane Cahill

Mael Mórdha (/ˌmeɪl ˈmɔːrə/ mayl MOR-ə, Irish: [ˌmˠeːlˠ ˈmˠoːɾˠə]) are an Irish doom and Celtic metal band from Dublin. Its name can also be written in traditional Irish typography, as Mael Mórḋa. The band's music melds doom metal with Irish folk music to create what has been referred to as "Gaelic doom metal".

== History ==
Mael Mórdha was formed in January 1998 by Roibéard Ó Bogail (formerly the vocalist of the band Dreamsfear). On the strength of the band's last two EPs, Caoineadh na nGael and Cluain Tarbh, the band was signed to Dutch label Karmageddon Media which released the band's first album, Cluain Tarbh on 12 September 2005. An alternative recording of the album title track was released on a limited edition 7 inch vinyl split with their fellow Irishmen Primordial, through Sentinel Records in the winter of 2005.

Due to severe internal problems within Karmageddon and a lack of availability of the album, the band left the label and signed to Grau Records in Germany in February 2006. Gealtacht Mael Mórdha is the band's first album to be released through Grau Records, on 19 March 2007. In 2008, their debut album was re-released by Grau Records with two additional tracks previously recorded on the band's first EP, The Path to Insanity.

The band has played the Abbeyleix Metalfest (Ireland, 1999), Day of Darkness (Ireland, 2003, 2004, 2007), Bloodstock Open Air (England, 2006, 2013), Heathen Crusade II (Saint Paul, Minnesota, United States, 2007), Doom Shall Rise, (Göppingen, Germany, 2007) and Dutch Doom Days (Rotterdam, Netherlands, 2007).

The band entered the Irish leg of the Eurovision Song Contest 2005 in late 2004, with the aim of entering the finals held in Kyiv, Ukraine in 2005.

Mael Mórdha's third album, entitled Manannán, was released on 14 May 2010 by Grau Records.

Between November 2011 and January 2012, Mael Mórdha recorded their fourth album at Foel Studio in Wales with producer Chris Fielding. Entitled Damned When Dead, the album was released by Candlelight Records in September 2013. In January 2014, Roibéard Ó Bogail left the band. He was replaced by Celtachor vocalist/whistle player Stíofán De Roiste in October of that year.

The band went on hiatus in November 2015, returning for one concert in 2018.

In 2016 Murphy, Cahill, and Clince formed Death the Leveller alongside former Cursed Earth vocalist, Denis Dowling.

== Members ==
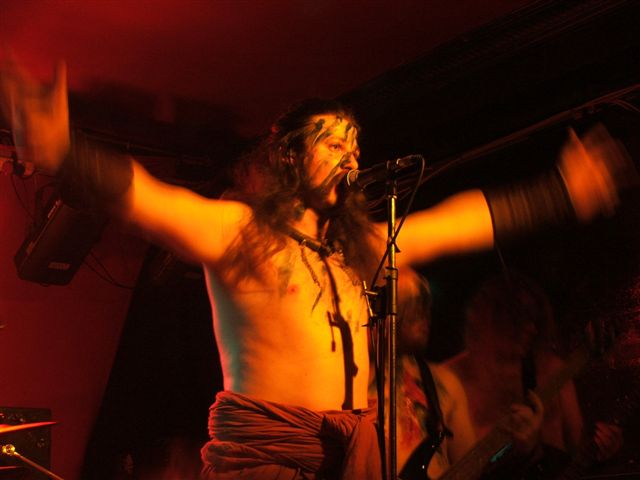
Mael Mórdha performing in 2007

=== Current ===
- Stíofán De Roiste – vocals, whistle
- Gerry Clince – guitars
- Dave Murphy – bass
- Shane Cahill – drums

=== Former ===
- Roibéard Ó Bogail – vocals
- Anthony Lindsay – guitars

== Discography ==
=== Albums ===
| Year | Album |
|---|---|
| 2005 | Cluain Tarbh |
| 2007 | Gealtacht Mael Mórdha |
| 2010 | Manannán |
| 2013 | Damned When Dead |

=== EPs/splits ===
| Year | EP |
|---|---|
| 1999 | The Path to Insanity |
| 2000 | The Inferno Spreads |
| 2003 | Caoineadh na nGael |
| 2004 | Cluain Tarbh E.P. |
| 2005 | Primordial / Mael Mórdha |
