= Benjamin Briggs =

American sailor (1835–1872)

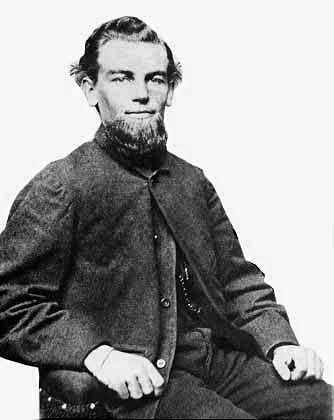
- Born: April 24, 1835; Massachusetts, U.S.
- Died: Unknown, likely November 1872 (aged 37); Atlantic Ocean
- Occupations: Seaman, master mariner
- Spouse: Sarah Elizabeth Briggs (1862–1872)
- Children: 2

Benjamin Spooner Briggs (April 24, 1835 – died likely November 1872) was an experienced American seaman and master mariner. He was the captain of the merchant ship Mary Celeste, which was discovered unmanned and drifting in the Atlantic Ocean midway between the Azores and the coast of Portugal on December 4, 1872. The lifeboat was missing, yet the Mary Celeste was still under sail. Briggs, his wife Sarah and their two-year-old daughter Sophia Matilda were never found and were presumed lost, along with the crew of Mary Celeste.

== Maritime career ==
The Briggs family of Massachusetts had a long maritime connection, and Benjamin Briggs himself spent most of his life at sea. He was an experienced, hardy, and able seaman. He reportedly was respected by those who served under him because of his fairness and ability. He worked his way to eventually become a master mariner. Briggs captained the brigantine Sea Foam, and in 1862 became master of the three-masted schooner Forest King. When he took command of the bark Arthur in 1865, he turned over command of the Forest King to his brother, Oliver Briggs. Oliver Briggs was a frequent business partner.

== Family ==
Briggs was devoutly religious and a believer in abstinence. In 1862, he married Sarah Elizabeth Cobb, daughter of the reverend Leander Cobb. The newlyweds sailed to Europe in Briggs' schooner Forest King. Their son Arthur S. Briggs was born in 1865 at the family home at Rose Cottage, Marion, Massachusetts. The following year, the family travelled to Marseille, France, returning in time for the birth of their daughter Sophia Matilda on October 31, 1870.

== Mary Celeste ==
Lap desk of Captain Benjamin Briggs from the Mary Celeste (Salem, Peabody Essex Museum)

In 1871 Briggs and his brother considered purchasing a hardware store in New Bedford. However, in 1872, he purchased a share in the brigantine Mary Celeste, owned by James Winchester, and modified the cabin to house his family. In late 1872, his wife and daughter accompanied him on the ill-fated voyage from Staten Island, New York to Genoa, Italy. Briggs' son Arthur stayed with his grandmother at Rose Cottage in Marion, Massachusetts in order to attend school.

The following month, Briggs' ship was found abandoned in the Atlantic Ocean near the Straits of Gibraltar. Briggs, his wife, his daughter and the crew of the Mary Celeste were never found and their fate remains a mystery.

== Legacy ==
A cenotaph memorializing the family stands in the Evergreen Cemetery in Marion, Massachusetts. The inscription reads: "Capt. Benj S. Briggs born Apr 24, 1835, Sarah E Cobb his wife born Apr 20 1841, Sophia M, their daughter, born Oct 31, 1870. Lost in Brig Mary Celeste Nov 1872".

== See also ==
- List of people who disappeared mysteriously at sea
