= Dei Gratia (brigantine) =

Canadian ship

History

Canada
- Name: Dei Gratia
- Owner: George F. Miller, Bear River, Nova Scotia
- Port of registry: Digby, Nova Scotia, Official No. 69014
- Laid down: 1871
- Launched: Bear River, Nova Scotia
- Fate: Wrecked at Dale, Pembrokeshire, 27 December 1907

General characteristics
- Tonnage: 295 GRT; 237 NT
- Length: 111 ft (34 m)
- Beam: 28 ft (8.5 m)
- Depth: 13 ft (4.0 m)
- Propulsion: Sail
- Sail plan: brigantine

Dei Gratia was a Canadian brigantine built in Bear River, Nova Scotia, in 1871. She was named after the Latin phrase for "By the Grace of God". She became famous in 1872, when under the command of David Reed Morehouse, she discovered the ghost ship Mary Celeste without any crew near the Azores. They were 400 miles (640 km) east of the Azores on 5 December 1872. Morehouse and his crew took the derelict Mary Celeste to Gibraltar and claimed the brigantine as salvage. They were at first subjected to suspicion by Gibraltar's attorney general, but the Vice Admiralty Court later approved their salvage prize and commended the crew for their resourcefulness and courage. The hefty court expenses of the extensive probe reduced the salvage compensation, which was originally set at roughly $8,300. Only a sixth of the money was really paid.

Dei Gratia was sold to Irish owners in 1881 and wrecked at Black Rock, Dale, Pembrokeshire, after breaking her moorings in a storm on 27 December 1907. Her original ship portrait is preserved at the Maritime Museum of the Atlantic in Halifax, Nova Scotia.
