= Mary Celeste =

Ship found abandoned in the Atlantic Ocean in 1872

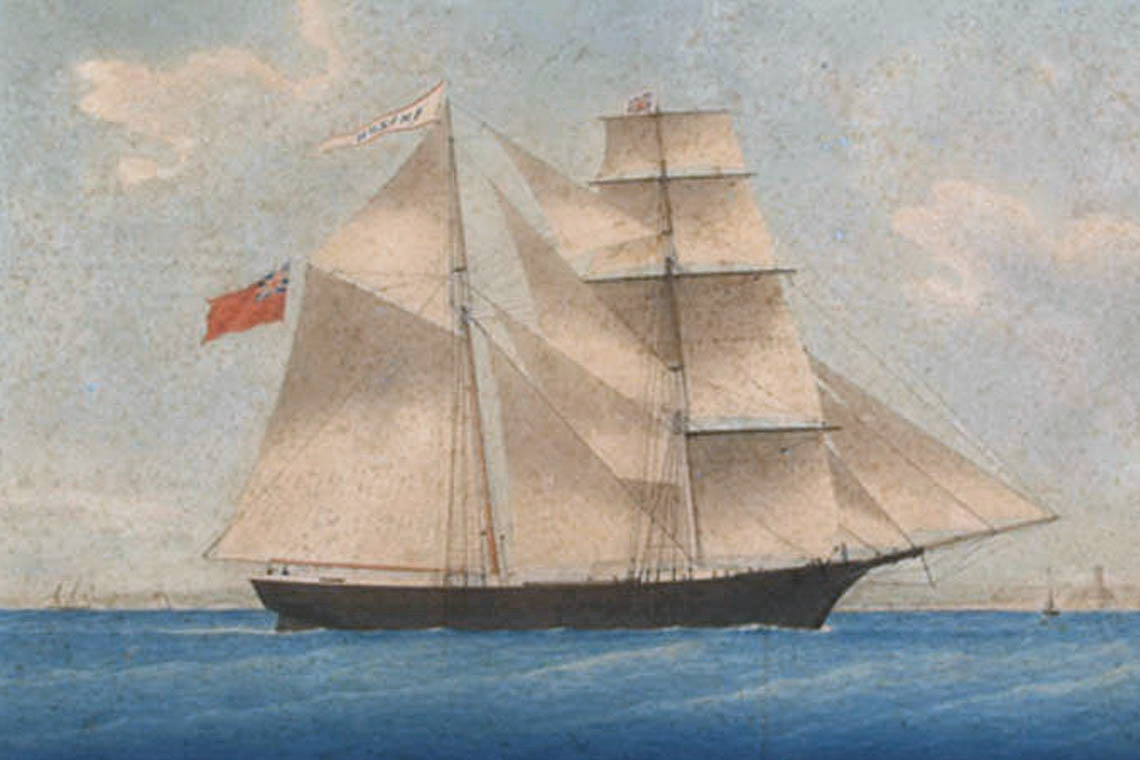
- 1861 painting of Amazon

History

Canada
- Name: Amazon
- Port of registry: Parrsboro, Nova Scotia
- Builder: Joshua Dewis, Spencers Island, Nova Scotia
- Launched: May 18, 1861
- Fate: Ran aground Glace Bay, Nova Scotia, 1867, salvaged and given to American owners

United States
- Name: Amazon (1861–1868); Mary Celeste (1869–1885)
- Port of registry: Principally New York or Boston
- Builder: Rebuilt 1872, New York (yard not named)
- Fate: Deliberately wrecked off the coast of Haiti, 1885

General characteristics
- Tonnage: 198.42 gross tons as built 1861; 282.28 gross tons after rebuild 1872
- Length: 99.3 ft (30.3 m) as built, 103 ft (31 m) after rebuild
- Beam: 22.5 ft (6.9 m) as built, 25.7 ft (7.8 m) after rebuild
- Depth: 11.7 ft (3.6 m) as built, 16.2 ft (4.9 m) after rebuild
- Decks: 1, as built, 2 after rebuild
- Sail plan: Brigantine

Mary Celeste (/sə.ˈlɛst/, often erroneously referred to as Marie Celeste) was a Canadian-built, American-registered, merchant brigantine that was discovered adrift and deserted in the Atlantic Ocean off the Azores on December 4, 1872.

The Canadian brigantine Dei Gratia found the Mary Celeste in a dishevelled but seaworthy condition under partial sail and with the lifeboat missing. The last entry in the log was dated 10 days earlier. The ship had left New York City for Genoa on November 7 and was still amply provisioned when found. The cargo of alcohol was intact, and the captain's and crew's personal belongings were undisturbed. None of those who had been on board were ever seen or heard from again.

Mary Celeste was built in Spencers Island, Nova Scotia, and launched under British registration as Amazon in 1861. The ship was transferred to American ownership and registration in 1868, when given a new name. Thereafter, Mary Celeste sailed uneventfully until the 1872 voyage. At the salvage hearings in Gibraltar following the ship's recovery, the court's officers considered various possibilities of foul play, including mutiny by Mary Celeste's crew, piracy by the Dei Gratia crew or others, and conspiracy to carry out insurance or salvage fraud. No convincing evidence supported these theories, but unresolved suspicions led to a relatively low salvage award.

The inconclusive nature of the hearings fostered continued speculation as to what had happened to the ship's occupants, and the story has repeatedly been complicated by false detail and fantasy. Hypotheses that have been advanced include the effects on the crew of alcohol fumes rising from the cargo, submarine earthquakes, waterspouts, attack by a giant squid, and paranormal intervention.

After the Gibraltar hearings, Mary Celeste continued in service under new owners. In 1885, the captain deliberately wrecked her off the coast of Haiti as part of an attempted insurance fraud. The story of the ship's 1872 abandonment has been recounted and dramatized many times in documentaries, novels, plays, and films, and the name of the ship has become a byword for unexplained desertion. In 1884, Arthur Conan Doyle wrote "J. Habakuk Jephson's Statement", a short story based on the mystery. The story's popularity led to the "Marie Celeste" spelling becoming more common than the original in everyday use.

== Early history ==
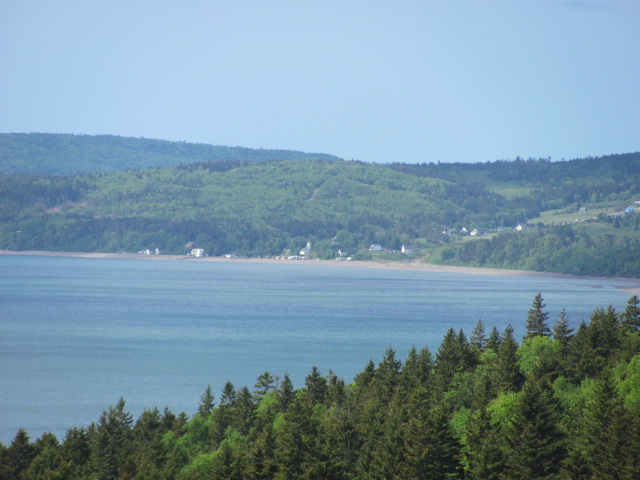
Spencers Island, photographed in 2011

The keel of the future Mary Celeste was laid in late 1860 at the shipyard of Joshua Dewis in the village of Spencers Island, on the shores of the Bay of Fundy in Nova Scotia. The ship was constructed of locally felled timber, with two masts, and was rigged as a brigantine; the ship was carvel-built, the hull planking flush rather than overlapping. The ship was launched on May 18, 1861, given the name Amazon, and registered at nearby Parrsboro on June 10, 1861. The registration documents described the ship as 99.3 feet (30.3 m) in length, 25.5 feet (7.8 m) broad, 11.7 feet (3.6 m) in depth, and of 198.42 gross tonnage. The ship was owned by a local consortium of nine people, headed by Dewis; among the co-owners was Robert McLellan, the ship's first captain.

For the maiden voyage in June 1861, Amazon sailed to Five Islands, Nova Scotia, to take on a cargo of timber for passage across the Atlantic to London. (Note: The historian Charles Edey Fay gives different details of the first voyage. In his account, the trip took Amazon first to the port of Windsor, Nova Scotia, where she was loaded with plaster for transport to New York.) After supervising the ship's loading, Captain McLellan fell ill; his condition worsened. The Amazon returned to Spencers Island, where McLellan died on June 19. John Nutting Parker took over as captain and resumed the voyage to London, in the course of which Amazon encountered further misadventures. The ship collided with fishing equipment in the narrows off Eastport, Maine, and after leaving London, ran into and sank a brig in the English Channel.

Parker remained in command for two years, during which Amazon worked mainly in the West Indies trade. The ship crossed the Atlantic to France in November 1861, and in Marseille was the subject of a painting, possibly by Honoré de Pellegrin, a well-known maritime artist of the Marseilles School. In 1863, Parker was succeeded by William Thompson, who remained in command until 1867. These were quiet years; Amazon's mate later recalled, "We went to the West Indies, England, and the Mediterranean—what we call the foreign trade. Not a thing unusual happened." In October 1867, at Cape Breton Island, Amazon was driven ashore in a storm and was so badly damaged that her owners abandoned her as a wreck. On October 15, the ship was acquired as a derelict by Alexander McBean, of Glace Bay, Nova Scotia.

=== Ownership reassignment and name change ===
Within a month, McBean sold the wreck to a local businessman, who in November 1868 sold it to Richard W. Haines, an American mariner from New York. Haines paid US$1,750 for the wreck and then spent $8,825 restoring it. He made himself her captain, and in December 1868, registered her with the Collector of the Port of New York as an American vessel, under a new name, Mary Celeste. (Note: The reason for the choice of name is unclear; Begg points out that Maria Celeste was an illegitimate daughter of the astronomer Galileo Galilei and was also the name of a well-known nun, either of which might have influenced Haines.)

In October 1869, the ship was seized by Haines' creditors and sold to a New York consortium headed by James H. Winchester. During the next three years, the composition of this consortium changed several times, although Winchester retained at least a half-share throughout. No records of Mary Celeste's trading activities during this period have been found. Early in 1872, the ship underwent a major refitting, costing $10,000, which enlarged her considerably. Her length was increased to 103 feet (31 m), her breadth to 25.7 feet (7.8 m) and her depth to 16.2 feet (4.9 m). Among the structural changes, a second deck was added; an inspector's report refers to extensions to the poop deck, new transoms, and the replacement of many timbers. The work increased the ship's displacement to 282.28 tonnes. On October 29, 1872, the consortium was made up of Winchester with six shares and two minor investors with one share apiece; the remaining four of twelve shares were held by the ship's new captain, Benjamin Spooner Briggs.

=== Captain Briggs and crew ===
Lap desk of Captain Benjamin Briggs, recovered from the Mary Celeste in 1872 (Salem, Peabody Essex Museum)

Benjamin Briggs was born in Wareham, Massachusetts, on April 24, 1835, one of five sons of sea captain Nathan Briggs. All but one of the sons went to sea, two becoming captains. Benjamin was an observant Christian who read the Bible regularly and often bore witness to his faith at prayer meetings. In 1862, he married his cousin Sarah Elizabeth Cobb, and enjoyed a Mediterranean honeymoon on board his schooner Forest King. Two children were born: Arthur in September 1865 and Sophia Matilda in October 1870.

By the time of Sophia's birth, Briggs had achieved a high standing within his profession. He considered retiring from the sea to go into business with his seafaring brother Oliver, who had also grown tired of the wandering life. They did not proceed with this project, but each invested his savings in a share of a ship: Oliver invested in Julia A. Hallock and Benjamin in Mary Celeste. (Note: Julia A. Hallock sank during a storm in the Bay of Biscay on January 8, 1873, while the Mary Celeste mystery was under discussion in Gibraltar. Captain Oliver Briggs went down with the ship, from which only one person survived.) In October 1872, Benjamin took command of Mary Celeste for her first voyage following her extensive New York refitting, which was to take her to Genoa in Italy. He arranged for his wife and infant daughter to accompany him, while his school-aged son was left at home in the care of his grandmother.

Briggs chose the crew for this voyage with care. First mate Albert G. Richardson was married to a niece of Winchester's and had sailed under Briggs before. Second mate Andrew Gilling, aged about 25, was born in New York, and was of Danish extraction. The steward, newly married Edward William Head, was signed on with a personal recommendation from Winchester. The four general seamen were Germans from the Frisian Islands (brothers Volkert and Boz Lorenzen), Arian Martens, and Gottlieb Goudschaal. A later testimonial described them as "peaceable and first-class sailors." In a letter to his mother shortly before the voyage, Briggs declared himself eminently satisfied with ship and crew. Sarah Briggs informed her mother that the crew appeared to be quietly capable "... if they continue as they have begun."

== Abandonment ==
=== New York ===
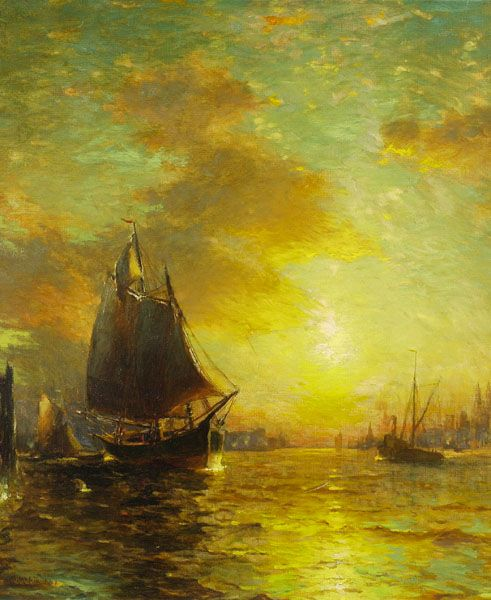
A painting by George McCord of New York Harbor in the 19th century

On October 20, 1872, Briggs arrived at Pier 50 on the East River in New York City to supervise the loading of the ship's cargo of 1,701 barrels of alcohol; his wife and infant daughter joined him a week later. On Sunday, November 3, Briggs wrote to his mother to say that he intended to leave on Tuesday, adding, "our vessel is in beautiful trim and I hope we shall have a fine passage."

On the morning of Tuesday, November 5, Mary Celeste left Pier 50 with Briggs, his wife and daughter, and seven crew members, and moved into New York Harbor. The weather was uncertain, and Briggs decided to wait for better conditions. He anchored the ship just off Staten Island, where Sarah used the delay to send a final letter to her mother-in-law. "Tell Arthur," she wrote, "I make great dependence on the letters I shall get from him, and will try to remember anything that happens on the voyage which he would be pleased to hear." The weather eased two days later, and Mary Celeste left the harbor and entered the Atlantic.

While Mary Celeste prepared to sail, the Canadian brigantine Dei Gratia lay nearby in Hoboken, New Jersey, awaiting a cargo of petroleum destined for Genoa via Gibraltar. Captain David Morehouse and first mate Oliver Deveau were Nova Scotians, both highly experienced and respected seamen. Captains Briggs and Morehouse shared common interests, and some writers think they likely knew each other, if only casually. Some accounts assert that they were close friends who dined together on the evening before Mary Celeste's departure, but the evidence for this is limited to a recollection by Morehouse's widow 50 years after the event. (Note: Lionel and Patricia Fanthorpe report the friendship and the farewell dinner as facts, while other writers are dubious, notably Paul Begg: "One should not doubt the authority of Mrs. Morehouse, but in this case it seems almost inconceivable that such a friendship, had it existed, would not have been mentioned during the salvage hearings or have afterwards been independently confirmed by Captain Briggs' family.") Dei Gratia departed for Gibraltar on November 15, following the same general route eight days after Mary Celeste.

=== Derelict ===
Location map

Dei Gratia reached a position of 38°20′N 17°15′W, midway between the Azores and the coast of mainland Portugal about 1 pm on Wednesday, December 4, 1872, land time (Thursday, December 5, sea time). (Note: "Sea time" in the 19th century was 12 hours ahead of land time, thus the new day started at noon in sea time.) Captain Morehouse came on deck, and the helmsman reported a vessel heading unsteadily towards Dei Gratia at a distance around six miles (9.7 km). The ship's erratic movements and the odd set of sails led Morehouse to suspect something was wrong. As the vessel drew close, he could see nobody on deck and received no reply to his signals, so he sent Deveau and second mate John Wright in a ship's boat to investigate. The pair established that this was the Mary Celeste by the name on the ship's stern; they then climbed aboard and found the ship deserted. The sails were partly set and in poor condition, some missing altogether, and much of the rigging was damaged, with ropes hanging loosely over the sides. The main hatch cover was secure, but the fore and lazarette hatches were open, their covers beside them on the deck. The ship's single lifeboat was a small yawl that had apparently been stowed across the main hatch, but it was missing, while the binnacle housing the ship's compass had shifted from its place and its glass cover was broken. About three and a half feet (1.1 m) of water were in the hold, a significant but not alarming amount for a ship of this size. A makeshift sounding rod (a device for measuring the amount of water in the hold) was found abandoned on the deck.

They found the ship's daily log in the mate's cabin, and its final entry was dated at 8 am on November 25, nine days earlier. It recorded Mary Celeste's position then as 37°1′N 25°1′W off Santa Maria Island in the Azores, nearly 400 nautical miles (740 km) from the point where Dei Gratia encountered the ship. Deveau saw that the cabin interiors were wet and untidy from water that entered through doorways and skylights, but were otherwise in reasonable order. He found personal items scattered about Briggs' cabin, including a sheathed sword under the bed, but most of the ship's papers were missing, along with the captain's navigational instruments. No signs of fire or violence were obvious; the evidence indicated an orderly departure from the ship by means of the missing lifeboat.

Briggs' cousin Oliver Cobb suggested that the transfer of personnel to the yawl may have been intended as a temporary safety measure in the wake of anticipated danger. He speculated from Deveau's report on the state of the rigging and ropes that the ship's main halyard may have been used to attach the yawl to the ship, enabling the company to return to Mary Celeste when the danger had passed. However, Mary Celeste would have sailed away empty if the line had parted, leaving the yawl adrift with its occupants. Begg notes that attaching the yawl to a vessel that the crew thought was about to explode or sink would be illogical. Macdonald Hastings argues that Briggs was an experienced captain who would not have led a panicked abandonment, writing: "If Mary Celeste had blown her timbers, she would still have been a better bet for survival than the ship's boat." According to Hastings, if Briggs had relied on the ship's boat for survival rather than on Mary Celeste, he would have "behaved like a fool; worse, a frightened one."

Deveau returned to report his findings to Morehouse, who decided to bring the derelict into Gibraltar 600 nautical miles (1,100 km) away. Under maritime law, a salvor could expect a substantial share of the combined value of rescued vessel and cargo, the exact award depending on the degree of danger inherent in the salvaging. Morehouse divided Dei Gratia's crew of eight between the two vessels, sending Deveau and two experienced seamen to Mary Celeste, while four others and he remained on Dei Gratia. The weather was relatively calm for most of the way to Gibraltar, but each ship was seriously undermanned and progress was slow. Dei Gratia reached Gibraltar on December 12; Mary Celeste had encountered fog and arrived on the following morning. The ship was immediately impounded by the vice admiralty court to prepare for salvage hearings. Deveau wrote to his wife that the ordeal of bringing the ship in was such that "I can hardly tell what I am made of, but I do not care so long as I got in safe. I shall be well paid for the Mary Celeste."

== Gibraltar salvage hearings ==
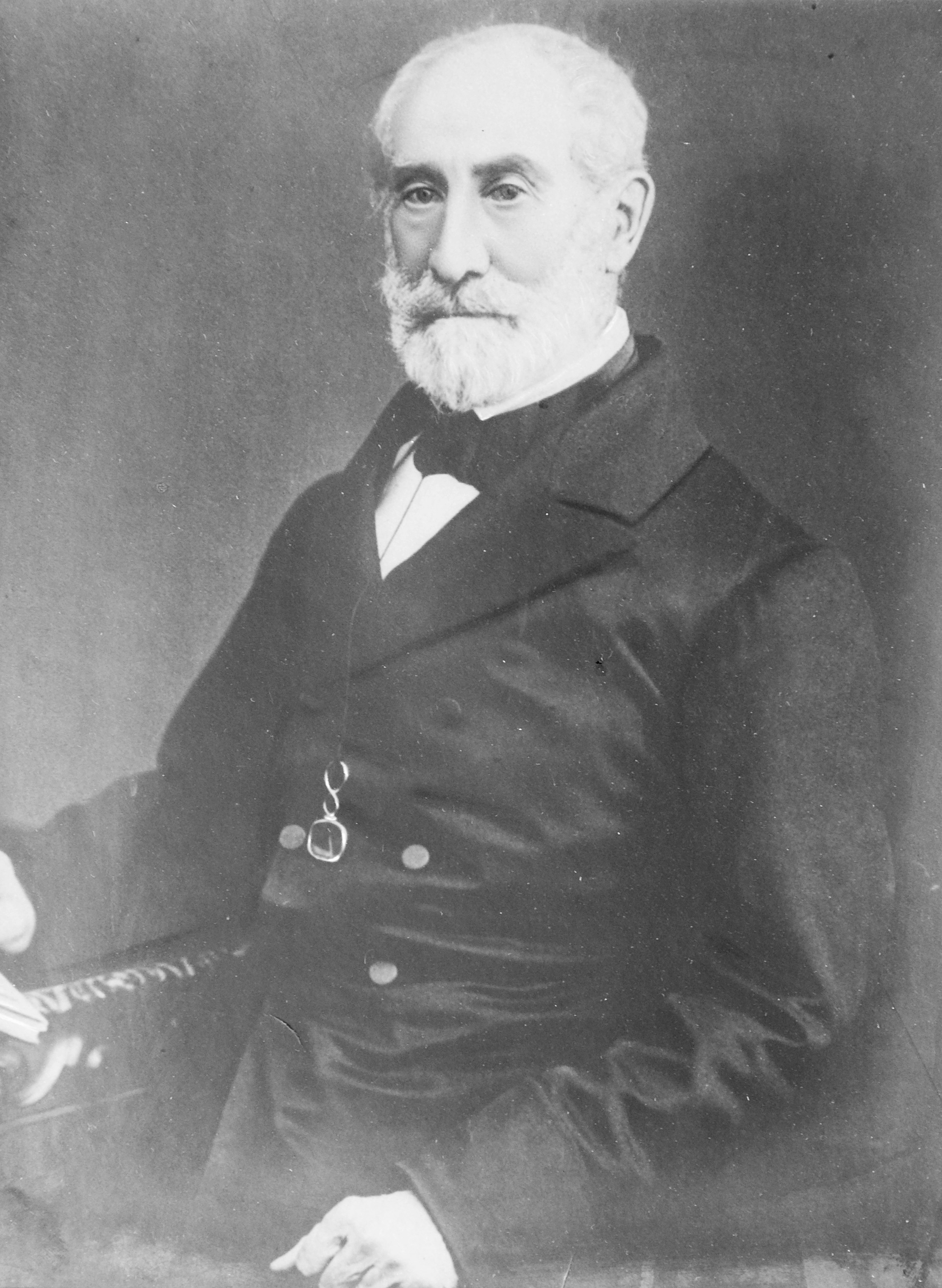
Sir James Cochrane, who oversaw the salvage court hearings

The salvage court hearings began in Gibraltar on December 17, 1872, under Sir James Cochrane, the chief justice of Gibraltar. The hearing was conducted by Frederick Solly-Flood, Attorney General of Gibraltar, who was also Advocate-General and Proctor for the Queen in Her Office of Admiralty. Flood was described by a historian of the Mary Celeste affair as a man "whose arrogance and pomposity were inversely proportional to his IQ", and as "... the sort of man who, once he had made up his mind about something, couldn't be shifted". The testimonies of Deveau and Wright convinced Flood unalterably that a crime had been committed, a belief picked up by the New York Shipping and Commercial List on December 21: "The inference is that there has been foul play somewhere, and that alcohol is at the bottom of it."

On December 23, Flood ordered an examination of Mary Celeste, which was carried out by John Austin, Surveyor of Shipping, with the assistance of a diver, Ricardo Portunato. Austin noted cuts on each side of the bow, caused, he thought, by a sharp instrument, and found possible traces of blood on the captain's sword. His report emphasized that the ship did not appear to have been struck by heavy weather, citing a vial of sewing machine oil found upright in its place. Austin did not acknowledge that the vial might have been replaced since the abandonment, nor did the court raise this point. Portunato's report on the hull concluded that the ship had not been involved in a collision or run aground.

A further inspection by a group of Royal Navy captains endorsed Austin's opinion that the cuts on the bow had been caused deliberately. They also discovered stains on one of the ship's rails that might have been blood, together with a deep mark possibly caused by an axe. These findings strengthened Flood's suspicions that human wrongdoing rather than natural disaster lay behind the mystery. On January 22, 1873, he sent the reports to the Board of Trade in London, adding his own conclusion that the crew had gotten at the alcohol and murdered the Briggs family and the ship's officers in a drunken frenzy. They had cut the bows to simulate a collision, then fled in the yawl to suffer an unknown fate. Flood thought that Morehouse and his men were hiding something, specifically that Mary Celeste had been abandoned in a more easterly location, and that the log had been doctored. He could not accept that Mary Celeste could have traveled so far while uncrewed. (Note: In disputing Flood's theory, Fay draws attention to the case of the William L. White, which in 1888–89 drifted unmanned for more than 5,000 nautical miles (9,300 km) over a period of 10 months, during which it was observed by 45 other vessels.)

James Winchester arrived in Gibraltar on January 15, to enquire when Mary Celeste might be released to deliver cargo. Flood demanded a surety of $15,000, money Winchester did not have. Winchester became aware that Flood thought Winchester might have deliberately engaged a crew that would kill Briggs and his officers as part of some conspiracy. On January 29, during a series of sharp exchanges with Flood, Winchester testified to Briggs' high character, and insisted that Briggs would not have abandoned the ship except in extremity. Flood's theories of mutiny and murder received significant setbacks when scientific analysis of the stains found on the sword and elsewhere on the ship showed that they were not blood. (Note: Although these conclusions were made known to Cochrane and Flood, their publication was withheld for 14 years, enabling stories of likely bloodshed and violence to linger in the public mind.) A second blow to Flood followed in a report commissioned by Horatio Sprague, the American consul in Gibraltar, from Captain Robert W. Shufeldt of the US Navy. In Shufeldt's view, the marks on the bow were not man-made, but came from the natural actions of the sea on the ship's timbers.

With nothing concrete to support his suspicions, Flood reluctantly released Mary Celeste from the court's jurisdiction on February 25. Two weeks later, with a locally raised crew headed by Captain George Blatchford from Massachusetts, the ship left Gibraltar for Genoa. The question of the salvage payment was decided on April 8, when Cochrane announced the award: £1,700, or about one-fifth of the total value of ship and cargo. This was far lower than the general expectation; one authority thought that the award should have been twice or even three times that amount, given the level of hazard in bringing the derelict into port. Cochrane's final words were harshly critical of Morehouse for his decision, earlier in the hearing, to send Dei Gratia under Deveau to deliver cargo of petroleum, although Morehouse had remained in Gibraltar at the disposal of the court. In his 2005 book, Ghost Ship: The Mysterious True Story of the Mary Celeste and Her Missing Crew, writer Brian Hicks said Cochrane's tone carried an implication of wrongdoing, which ensured that Morehouse and his crew "...would be under suspicion in the court of public opinion forever."

== Proposed explanations ==
Commentators generally agree that some extraordinary and alarming circumstance must have arisen to cause the entire crew to abandon a sound and seaworthy ship with ample provisions.

=== Foul play ===
The evidence in Gibraltar failed to support Flood's theories of murder and conspiracy, yet suspicion of foul play lingered. Flood, and some newspaper reports, briefly suspected insurance fraud by Winchester on the basis that Mary Celeste was heavily overinsured. Winchester refuted these allegations, and no inquiry was instituted by the insurers that issued the policies. In 1931, an article in the Quarterly Review suggested that Morehouse could have lain in wait for Mary Celeste, then lured Briggs and his crew aboard Dei Gratia and killed them there. Paul Begg argues that this theory ignores the fact that Dei Gratia was the slower ship, having left New York eight days after Mary Celeste departed and would not have caught Mary Celeste before the ship reached Gibraltar.

Another theory posits that Briggs and Morehouse were partners in a conspiracy to share the salvage proceeds, although no evidence exists of a friendship between the two captains. Hicks comments, "[I]f Morehouse and Briggs had been planning such a scam, they would not have devised such an attention-drawing mystery." He also asks why Briggs abandoned his son Arthur if he had intended to disappear permanently.

Although Riffian pirates were active off the coast of Morocco in the 1870s, Charles Edey Fay observes that pirates would have looted the ship, but the personal possessions, some of significant value, of the captain and crew were undisturbed. In 1925, historian John Gilbert Lockhart surmised that Briggs slaughtered all on board and then killed himself in a fit of religious mania. Lockhart later spoke to Briggs' descendants, and he apologized and withdrew this theory in a later edition of his book.

=== Natural phenomena ===
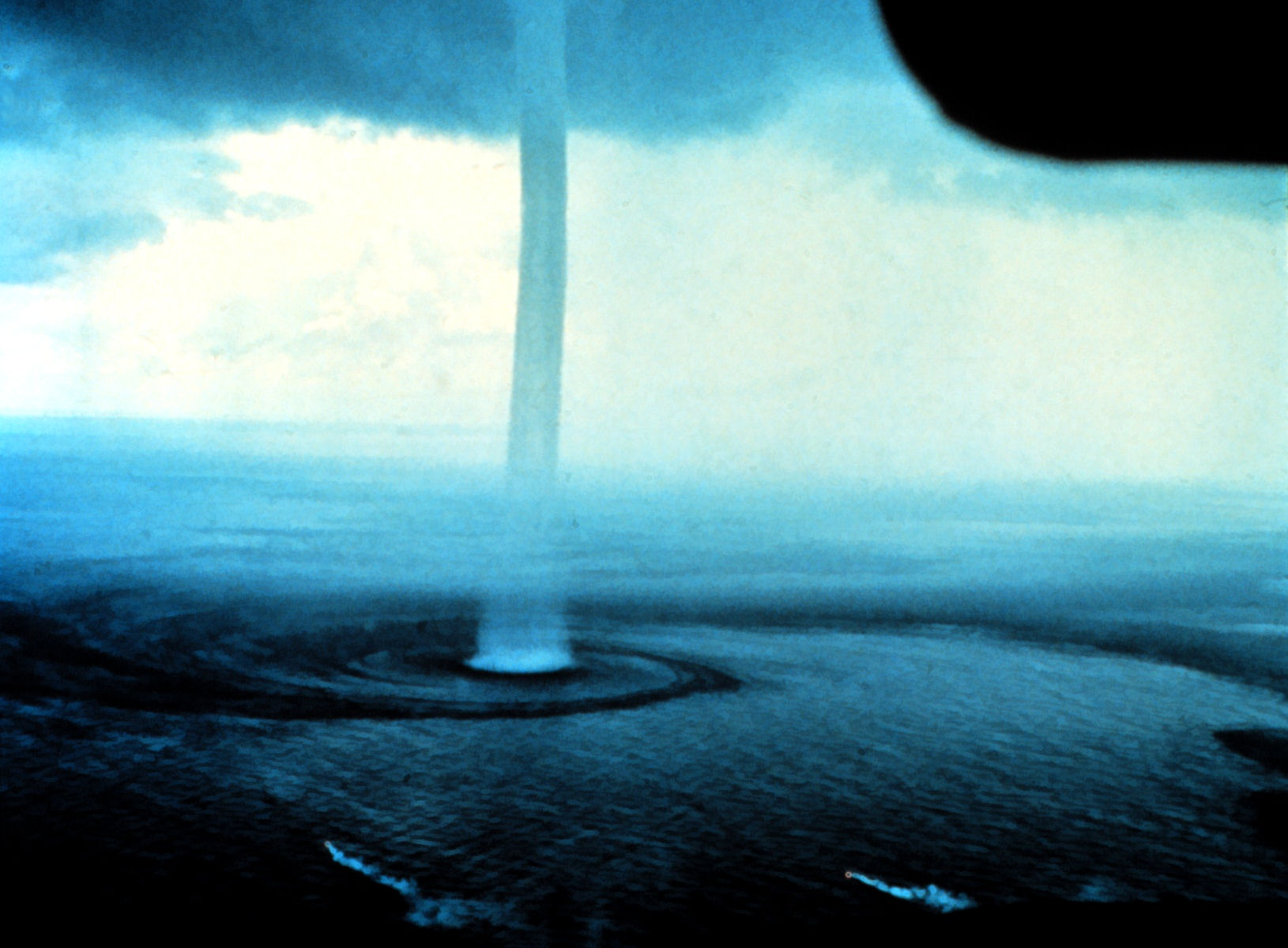
A waterspout, photographed off Florida (1969): A waterspout strike has been offered as a possible solution to the Mary Celeste mystery.

Deveau ventured an explanation based on the sounding rod found on deck. He suggested that Briggs abandoned ship after a false sounding because of a malfunction, perhaps of the pumps, that created a false impression that the vessel was rapidly accumulating water. A severe waterspout strike before the abandonment could explain the amount of water in the ship and the ragged state of the rigging and sails. The low barometric pressure generated by the spout could have driven water from the bilges up into the pumps, leading the crew to overestimate the amount of water on Mary Celeste and believe that the ship was in danger of sinking.

Other explanations include the possible appearance of a displaced iceberg, the fear of running aground while becalmed, and a sudden submarine earthquake. Hydrographical evidence suggests that an iceberg drifting so far south was improbable and other ships would have seen it. Begg gives more consideration to a theory that Mary Celeste began drifting towards the Dollabarat reef off Santa Maria Island when the ship was becalmed. The theory supposes that Briggs feared his ship would run aground and launched the yawl in the hope of reaching land. The wind could then have lifted and blown the ship away from the reef while the rising seas swamped and sank the yawl. However, if the ship had been becalmed, all sails would have been set to catch any available breeze, and Mary Celeste was found with many sails furled.

=== Explosion ===
Arthur N. Putman, a New York insurance appraiser, investigated the records of the event in 1910. He noted that the ship's log contained several mentions of ominous rumbling and small explosion sounds from the hold. He posited that a more intense explosion had then occurred, and in response, a sailor ventured below deck with an open flame or lit cigar that ignited the fumes, causing an explosion violent enough to dislodge the top of the hatch, which had been found in an unusual position. Putman further postulated that in a panicked terror, the captain, his family, and the crew boarded the lone lifeboat, cut the rope, and abandoned Mary Celeste.

A sequence of events considered by Begg begins with damage caused to parts of Mary Celeste's cargo, followed by the release of gaseous fumes. Rising fears of an imminent explosion could have led Briggs to order the ship's abandonment; the displaced hatches suggest that an inspection, or an attempted airing, had taken place. The New York World of January 24 1886 had drawn attention to a case in which a vessel carrying alcohol had exploded. The same newspaper's issue of February 9 1913 cited a seepage of alcohol through a few porous barrels as the source of gases that may have caused or threatened an explosion in Mary Celeste's hold. Briggs' cousin Oliver Cobb was a strong proponent of this theory, in which a sufficiently alarming scenario—rumblings from the hold, the smell of escaping fumes, and possibly an explosion—could have caused Briggs to have ordered the evacuation of the ship. In his haste to leave the ship before it exploded, Briggs may have failed to properly secure the yawl to the tow line. A sudden breeze could have blown the ship away from the occupants of the yawl, leaving them to succumb to the elements. (Note: In Genoa, 9 of the 1,701 barrels of alcohol were found empty, through seepage or minor damage. The remainder of the barrels were intact. This was considered an acceptable loss for a cargo of this kind.)

Though plausible, an explosion as the explanation has tended to be discounted because there was no sign of fire, or damage such that an explosion might have caused. In 2006, an experiment was performed for Channel Five television by chemist Andrea Sella, and the results helped to revive the explosion theory. Sella built a model of the hold, with paper cartons representing the barrels. Using butane gas, he created an explosion that caused a considerable blast and ball of flame, but contrary to expectation, no fire damage occurred within the replica hold. He said: "What we created was a pressure-wave type of explosion. There was a spectacular wave of flame, but behind it was relatively cool air. No soot was left behind and there was no burning or scorching." Channel Five screened another documentary in 2026 in which two chemists at the University of Manchester refined Sella's theories in an experiment with a model ship, using wood and ethanol in place of Sella's paper and butane in order to obtain a closer representation of the situation onboard the Mary Celeste. Their conclusion was that a rapid explosion of ethanol vapours, leaving no signs of damage, may have caused the crew to flee the ship in fear.

== Retellings and false histories ==
Fact and fiction became intertwined in the decades that followed. The Los Angeles Times retold the Mary Celeste story in June 1883 with invented detail. "Every sail was set, the tiller was lashed fast, not a rope was out of place. ... The fire was burning in the galley. The dinner was standing untasted and scarcely cold … the log written up to the hour of her discovery." The November 1906 Overland Monthly and Out West Magazine reported that Mary Celeste drifted off the Cape Verde Islands, some 1,400 nautical miles (2,600 km) south of the actual location. Among many inaccuracies, the first mate was "a man named Briggs", and live chickens were on board.

The most influential retelling, according to many commentators, was a story in the January 1884 issue of the Cornhill Magazine which ensured that the Mary Celeste affair would never be forgotten. This was an early work of Arthur Conan Doyle, a 25-year-old ship's surgeon at the time. Doyle's story "J. Habakuk Jephson's Statement" did not adhere to the facts. He renamed the ship Marie Celeste, the captain's name was J. W. Tibbs, the fatal voyage took place in 1873, and it was from Boston to Lisbon. The vessel carried passengers, among them the titular Jephson. In the story, a fanatic named Septimius Goring with a hatred of the white race has suborned members of the crew to murder Tibbs and take the vessel to the shores of Western Africa. The rest of the ship's company is killed, save for Jephson, who is spared because he possesses a magical charm that is venerated by Goring and his accomplices. (Note: The full text of Doyle's story is at "J. Habakuk Jephson's Statement". The Cornhill Magazine: 1–32. January 1884.) Doyle had not expected his story to be taken seriously, but Sprague was still serving as the U.S. consul in Gibraltar (Note: Sprague served in Gibraltar from 1848 to 1901; the report of his death in The New York Times of October 19, 1901, described him as the "oldest US consul".) and was sufficiently intrigued to inquire if any part of the story might be true.

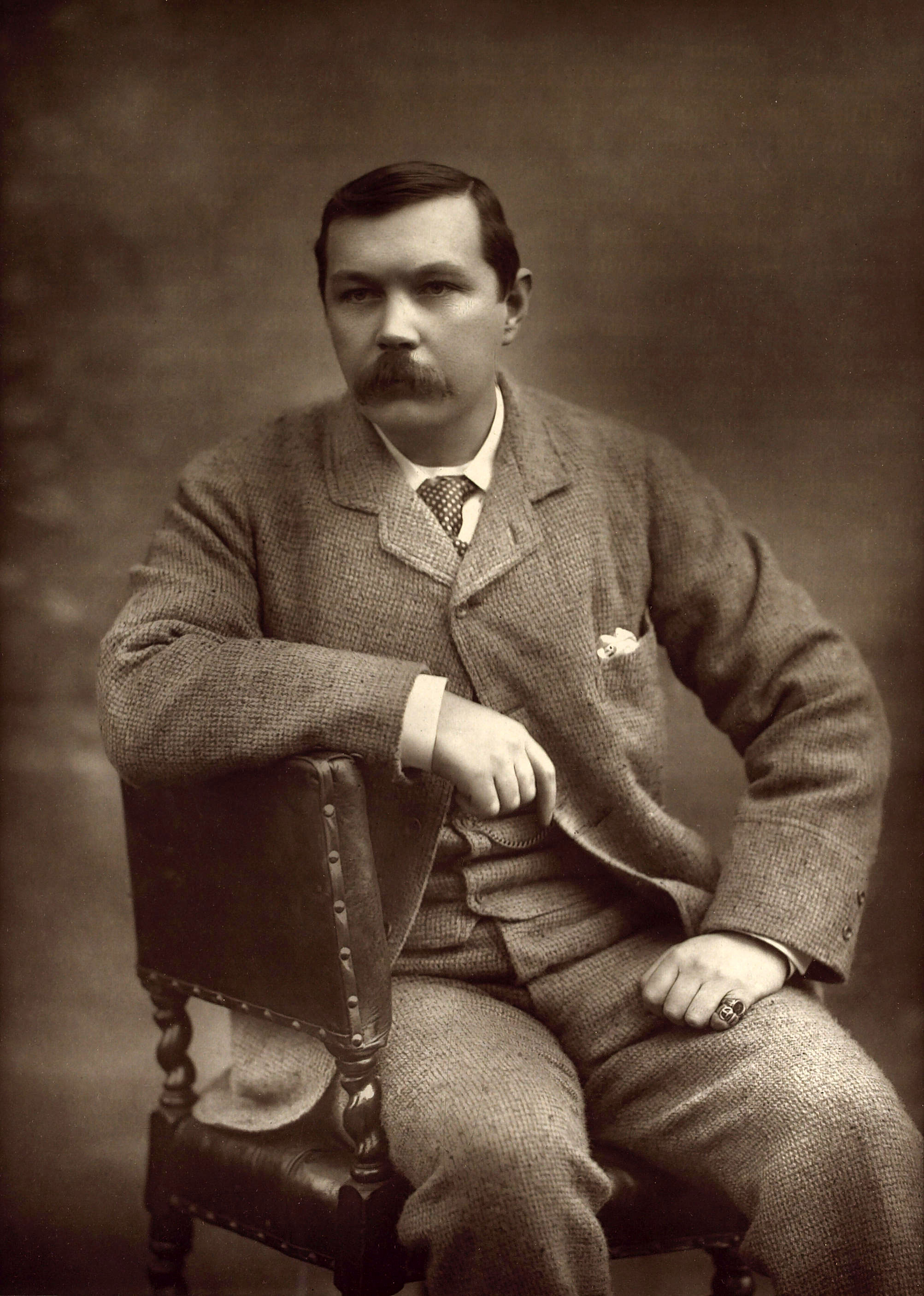
Arthur Conan Doyle, whose 1884 short story did much to disseminate Mary Celeste stories

Chambers' Journal of September 17, 1904, suggests that the entire complement of Mary Celeste was plucked off one by one by a giant octopus or squid. According to the Natural History Museum, giant squid (Architeuthis dux) can reach 15 m (49 ft) in length and have been known to attack ships. Begg remarks that such a creature could conceivably have picked off a crew member, but it could hardly have taken the yawl and the captain's navigation instruments.

In 1913, The Strand Magazine provided an alleged survivor's account from one Abel Fosdyk, supposedly Mary Celeste's steward. In this version, the crew had gathered on a temporary swimming platform to watch a swimming contest, when the platform suddenly collapsed. All except Fosdyk were drowned or eaten by sharks. Unlike Doyle's story, the magazine proposed this as a serious solution to the enigma, but it contained many simple mistakes, including "Griggs" for Briggs, "Boyce" for Morehouse, Briggs' daughter as a seven-year-old child rather than a two-year-old, a crew of 13, and an ignorance of nautical language. Many more people were convinced by a plausible literary hoax of the 1920s perpetrated by Irish writer Laurence J. Keating, again presented as a survivor's story of one John Pemberton. This one told a complex tale of murder, madness, and collusion with the Dei Gratia. It included basic errors, such as using Doyle's name (Marie Celeste) and misnaming key personnel. Nevertheless, the story was so convincingly told that the New York Herald Tribune of July 26, 1926, believed its truth to be beyond dispute. Hastings describes Keating's hoax as "an impudent trick by a man not without imaginative ability."

In 1924, the Daily Express published a story by Captain R. Lucy, whose alleged informant was Mary Celeste's former boatswain, although no such person is recorded in the registered crew list. In this tale, Briggs and his crew are cast in the role of predators; they see a derelict steamer, which they board and find deserted with £3,500 of gold and silver in the safe. They decide to split the money, abandon Mary Celeste, and seek new lives in Spain, which they reach by using the steamer's lifeboats. Hastings finds such an unlikely story being widely believed for a time to be astonishing; readers, he says, "were fooled by the magic of print."

Other explanations have suggested paranormal intervention; an undated edition of the British Journal of Astrology describes the Mary Celeste story as "a mystical experience", connecting it "with the Great Pyramid of Gizeh, the lost continent of Atlantis, and the British Israel Movement". The Bermuda Triangle has been invoked, though Mary Celeste was abandoned in a completely different part of the Atlantic. Similar fantasies have considered theories of abduction by aliens in flying saucers.

== Later career and final voyage ==
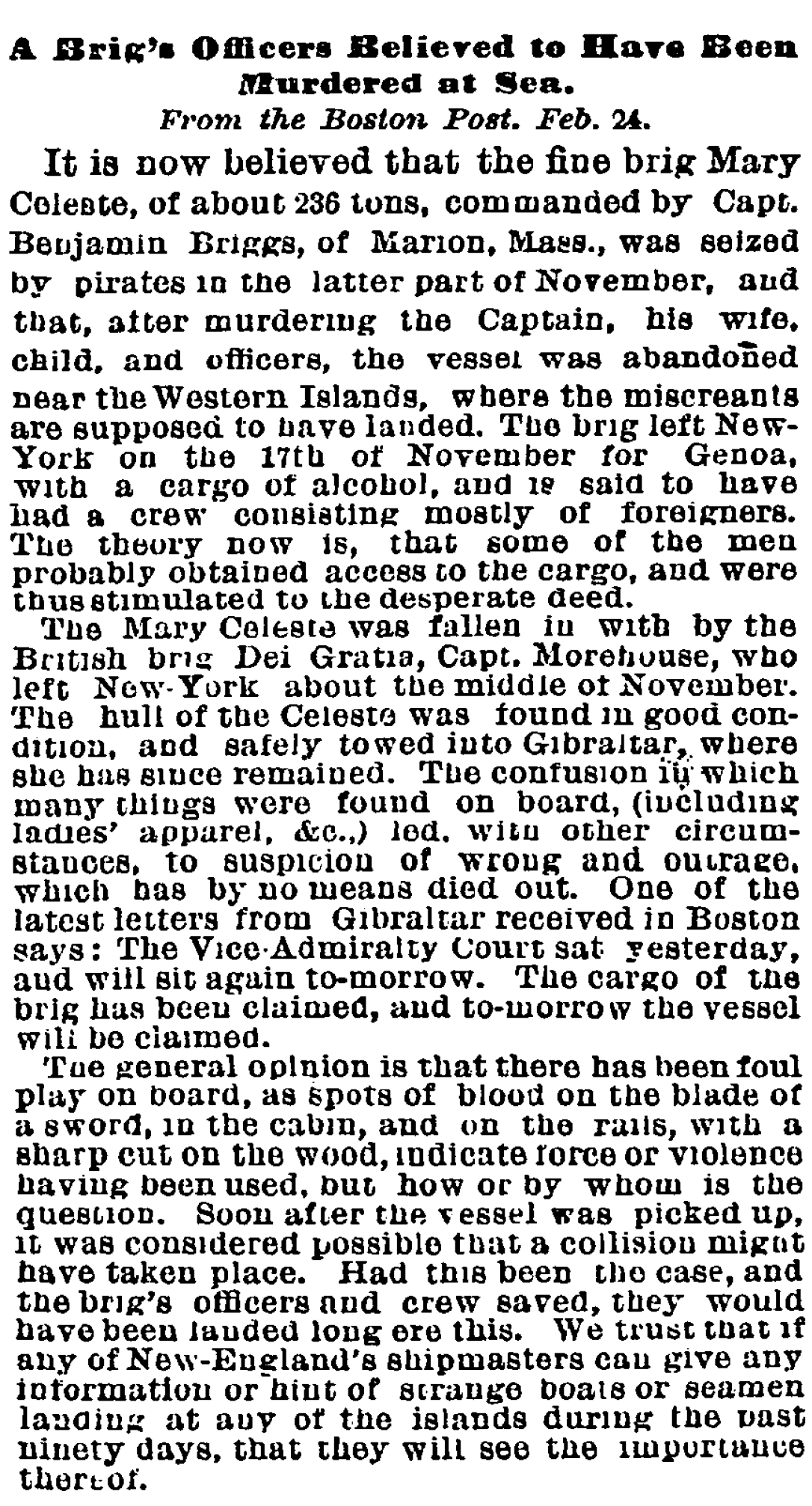
Newspaper article titled "A Brig's Officers Believed to Have Been Murdered at Sea"

Mary Celeste left Genoa on June 26, 1873, and arrived in New York on September 19. The Gibraltar hearings, with newspaper stories of bloodshed and murder, had made Mary Celeste an unpopular ship; Hastings records that the ship "... rotted on wharves where nobody wanted her." (Note: Two British newspapers, The Times and The Manchester Guardian, carried reports in February 1873 that mentioned the supposed bloodstains and the appearance of violence. The Boston Post of February 24 expressed the view that the crew, "mostly of foreigners", had gotten at the alcohol and subsequently murdered Briggs, his wife, his child, and the officers, before escaping to the "Western Islands". On March 24, the United States Department of the Treasury wrote in a circular of "grave suspicions" of murder by the crew in a drunken fury.) In February 1874, the consortium sold the ship, at a considerable loss, to a partnership of New York businessmen.

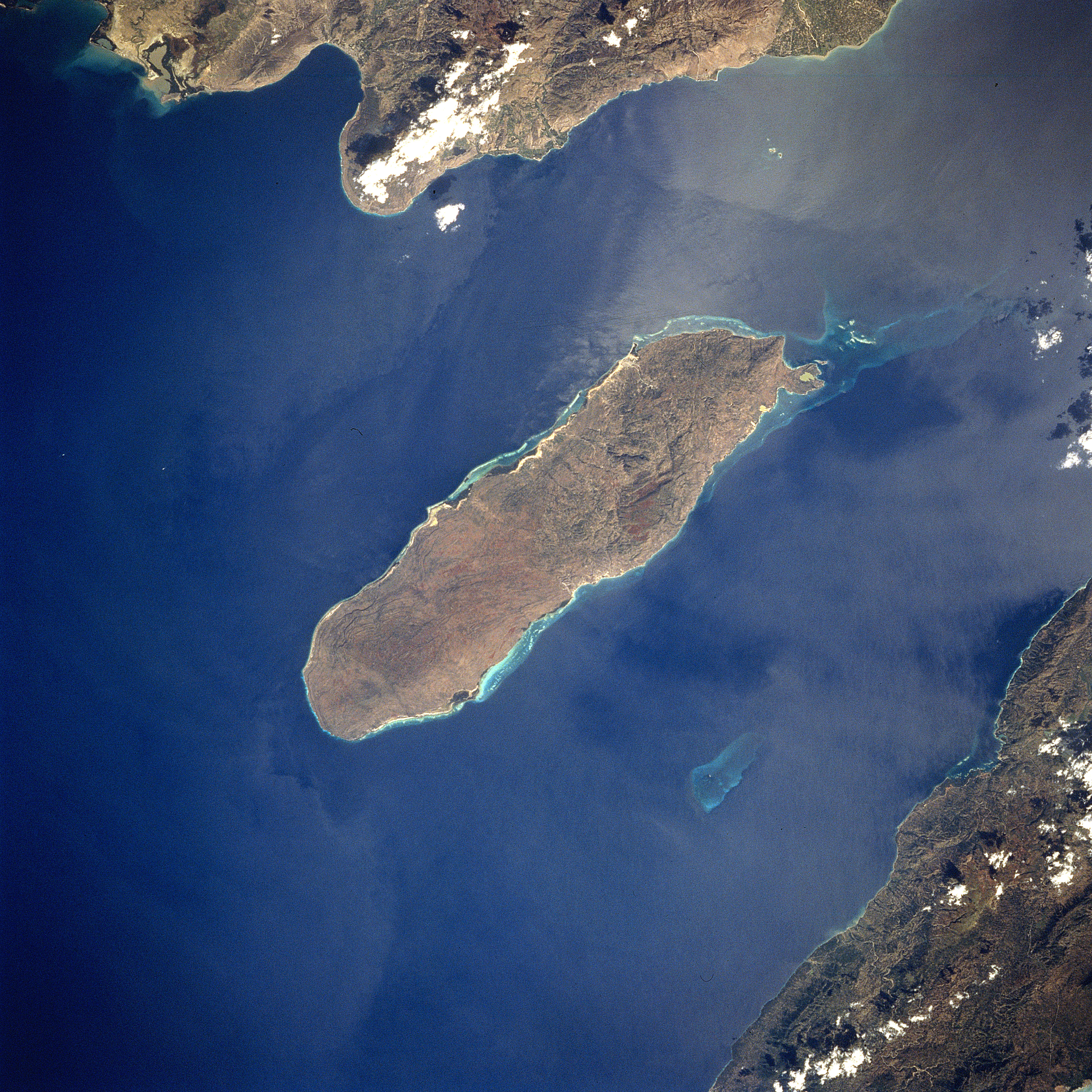
Gonâve Island, in the Gulf of Gonâve, Haiti. The Rochelois Bank is faintly discernible in the southerly channel between the island and the mainland.

Under this new ownership, Mary Celeste sailed mainly in the West Indian and Indian Ocean routes, regularly losing money. Details of the ship's movements occasionally appeared in the shipping news; in February 1879, the ship was reported at the island of St. Helena, having called to seek medical assistance for Captain Edgar Tuthill, who had fallen ill. Tuthill died on the island, encouraging the idea that the ship was cursed—he was the third captain to die prematurely. In February 1880, the owners sold Mary Celeste to a partnership of Bostonians headed by Wesley Gove. A new captain, Thomas L. Fleming, remained in the post until August 1884, when he was replaced by Gilman C. Parker. During these years, the ship's port of registry changed several times, before reverting to Boston. No records of voyages during this time are known, although Brian Hicks, in his study of the affair, asserts that Gove tried hard to make a success.

In November 1884, Parker conspired with a group of Boston shippers, who filled Mary Celeste with a largely worthless cargo, misrepresented on the ship's manifest as valuable goods, and insured the ship for US$30,000 ($1,070,000 today). On December 16, Parker set out for Port-au-Prince, the capital and chief port of Haiti. On January 3, 1885, Mary Celeste approached the port via the channel between Gonâve Island and the mainland, in which lay a large and well-charted coral reef, the Rochelois Bank. Parker deliberately ran the ship on to this reef, ripping out the bottom and wrecking the ship beyond repair. The crew and he then rowed themselves ashore, where Parker sold the salvageable cargo for $500 to the American consul, and instituted insurance claims for the alleged value.

When the consul reported that what he had bought was almost worthless, the ship's insurers began a thorough investigation, which soon revealed the truth of the over-insured cargo. In July 1885, Parker and the shippers were tried in Boston for conspiracy to commit insurance fraud. Parker was additionally charged with "wilfully cast[ing] away the ship," a crime known as barratry, which at the time carried the death penalty. The conspiracy case was heard first, but on August 15, the jury announced that they could not agree on a verdict. Some jurors were unwilling to risk prejudicing Parker's forthcoming capital trial by finding him guilty on the conspiracy charge. Rather than ordering an expensive retrial, the judge negotiated an arrangement whereby the defendants withdrew their insurance claims and repaid all they had received. The barratry charge against Parker was deferred, and he was allowed to go free. Nevertheless, his professional reputation was ruined, and he died in poverty three months later. One of his co-defendants went mad, and another killed himself. Begg observes, "{I}f the court of man could not punish these men ... the curse that had devilled the ship since first skipper Robert McLellan had died on the maiden voyage could reach beyond the vessel's watery grave and exact its own terrible retribution."

In August 2001, an expedition headed by marine archaeologist and author Clive Cussler announced that they had found the remains of a ship embedded in the Rochelois reef. Only a few pieces of timber and some metal artifacts could be salvaged, the remainder of the wreckage being lost within the coral. Initial tests on the wood indicated that it was the type extensively used in New York shipyards at the time of Mary Celeste's 1872 refitting, and it seemed the remains of Mary Celeste had been found. However, dendrochronological tests carried out by Scott St George of the Geological Survey of Canada showed that the wood came from trees, most probably from the US state of Georgia, that would still have been growing in 1894, about 10 years after Mary Celeste's demise.

== Legacy and commemorations ==
Mary Celeste was not the first reported case of a ship being found strangely deserted on the high seas. Rupert Gould, a naval officer and investigator of maritime mysteries, lists other such occurrences between 1840 and 1855. (Note: Begg describes Gould as "... an able, intelligent and reliable researcher," but contends that, "It is not always easy to verify such stories ... because the facts and details get changed as the story passes through numerous tellings and retellings.") Whatever the truth of these stories, it is the Mary Celeste that is remembered; the ship's name, or the misspelled Marie Celeste, has become fixed in people's minds as synonymous with inexplicable desertion.

In October 1955, MV Joyita, a 70-ton motor vessel, disappeared in the South Pacific while traveling between Samoa and Tokelau, with 25 people on board. The vessel was found a month later, deserted and drifting north of Vanua Levu, 600 miles (970 km) from its route. None of those aboard was seen again, and a commission of inquiry failed to establish an explanation. David Wright, the affair's principal historian, has described the case as "... a classic marine mystery of Mary Celeste proportions."

The Mary Celeste story inspired two well-received radio plays in the 1930s, by L. Du Garde Peach and Tim Healey, and a stage version of Peach's play in 1949. Several novels have been published, generally offering natural rather than fantastic explanations. (Note: Among recent fact-based novels are: Richard Rees: The Shadow of the Mary Celeste. Published by Robert Hale, London 1995. ISBN 0-709-05745-8.; Brian Freemantle: The Mary Celeste. Published by Severn House Publishers, Sutton, Surrey 1999. ISBN 0-727-85411-9 (first published as The "Mary Celeste" under the pseudonym John Maxwell at Cape, 1979, ISBN 0-224-01671-7). Valerie Martin: The Ghost of the Mary Celeste. Published by Nan A. Talese/Doubleday, New York 2014. ISBN 978-0-3855-3350-8.) In 1935, the British film company Hammer Film Productions issued The Mystery of the Mary Celeste (retitled Phantom Ship for American audiences), starring Bela Lugosi as a deranged sailor. It was not a commercial success, although Begg considers it "a period piece well worth watching". A 1938 short film titled The Ship That Died presents dramatizations of a range of theories to explain the abandonment - mutiny, fear of explosion due to alcohol fumes, and the supernatural.

In November 2007, the Smithsonian Channel screened a documentary, The True Story of the Mary Celeste , which investigated many aspects of the case without offering any definite solution. One theory proposed pump congestion and instrument malfunction. The Mary Celeste had been used for transporting coal, which is known for its dust, before it was loaded with alcohol. The pump was found disassembled on deck, so the crew may have been attempting to repair it. The hull was packed full, and the captain would have no way of judging how much water had been taken on while navigating rough seas. The filmmakers postulated that the chronometer was faulty, meaning that Briggs could have ordered abandonment thinking that they were close to Santa Maria, when they were 120 miles (190 km) farther west.

On Spencers Island, Mary Celeste and the lost crew are commemorated by a monument at the site of the brigantine's construction and by a memorial outdoor cinema built in the shape of the vessel's hull. Postage stamps commemorating the incident have been issued by Gibraltar (twice) and by the Maldives (twice, once with the name of the ship misspelt as Marie Celeste).

== See also ==
- Ghost ship
- List of people who disappeared mysteriously at sea

== Sources ==
- Begg, Paul (2007). Mary Celeste: The Greatest Mystery of the Sea. Harlow, Essex: Pearson Education Ltd. ISBN 978-1-4058-3621-0.
- Fanthorpe, Lionel; Fanthorpe, Patricia (1997). The World's Greatest Unsolved Mysteries. Toronto: Hounslow Press. ISBN 978-0-88882-194-2.
- Fay, Charles Edey (1988). The Story of the Mary Celeste. New York: Dover Publications. ISBN 978-0-486-25730-3. Revised edition of book originally published by Peabody Museum, Salem, Massachusetts in 1942.
- Fujiwara, Chris (1998). Jacques Tourneur: The Cinema of Nightfall. Jefferson, North Carolina: McFarland. ISBN 978-1-4766-0811-2.
- Gould, Rupert (1946). The Stargazer Talks. London: Geoffrey Bles. OCLC 4904905.
- Hastings, Macdonald (1972). Mary Celeste. London: Michael Joseph. ISBN 978-0-7181-1024-6.
- Hicks, Brian (2004). Ghost Ship: The Mysterious True Story of the Mary Celeste and her Missing Crew. New York: Random House. ISBN 978-0-345-46665-5.
- Wright, David G (2002). Joyita: Solving the Mystery. Auckland: Auckland University Press. ISBN 978-1-86940-725-4.
