= Eluveitie discography =

- Studio albums: 9
- EPs: 1
- Live albums: 2
- Compilation albums: 3
- Singles: 19
- Music videos: 21
- Demo albums: 1

Eluveitie (/ɛlˈveɪti/ el-VAY-ti) is a Swiss folk metal band from Winterthur, Zürich founded by Chrigel Glanzmann. The band has released 9 studio albums, 2 live albums, 3 compilation albums, 1 extended play, 21 music videos, 19 singles and 1 demo album.

== Albums ==
=== Studio albums ===
| Title | Album details | Peak chart positions | | | | | | | | | | | Sale |
| Title | Album details | SWI | AUT | CAN | BEL (FL) | BEL (WA) | FIN | FRA | GER | UK | US | US Heat | Sale |
|---|---|---|---|---|---|---|---|---|---|---|---|---|---|
| Spirit | Released: 1 June 2006; Label: Fear Dark; Formats: CD, LP, digital download | — | — | — | — | — | — | — | — | — | — | — | |
| Slania | Released: 15 February 2008; Label: Nuclear Blast; Formats: CD, 2CD, CD+DVD, LP, digital download | 35 | — | — | — | — | — | — | 72 | — | — | — | |
| Evocation I: The Arcane Dominion | Released: 17 April 2009; Label: Nuclear Blast; Formats: CD, CD+DVD, LP, digital download | 20 | — | — | — | — | — | 195 | 60 | — | — | — | |
| Everything Remains (As It Never Was) | Released: 19 February 2010; Label: Nuclear Blast; Formats: CD, CD+DVD, LP, digital download | 8 | 22 | — | — | — | 31 | 110 | 19 | — | — | 23 | US: 1,300+ |
| Helvetios | Released: 10 February 2012; Label: Nuclear Blast; Formats: CD, CD+DVD, LP, digital download | 4 | 34 | 73 | — | — | 47 | 115 | 27 | — | 143 | 3 | US: 4,200+ |
| Origins | Released: 4 August 2014; Label: Nuclear Blast; Formats: CD, CD+DVD, LP, digital download | 1 | 22 | 60 | 89 | 115 | 37 | 70 | 6 | 163 | 104 | 1 | |
| Evocation II: Pantheon | Released: 18 August 2017; Label: Nuclear Blast; Formats: CD, LP, digital download | 2 | 18 | — | 74 | 42 | — | 64 | 11 | — | — | 6 | |
| Ategnatos | Released: 5 April 2019; Label: Nuclear Blast; Formats: CD, LP, digital download | 3 | 12 | — | 159 | — | — | 73 | 11 | — | — | — | |
| Ànv | Released: 25 April 2025; Label: Nuclear Blast; Formats: CD, LP, digital download | 5 | 6 | — | 88 | — | — | 153 | 16 | — | — | — | |
"—" denotes a recording that did not chart or was not released in that territory.

=== Live albums ===
| Title | Album details | Peak chart positions |
| Title | Album details | SWI |
|---|---|---|
| Live on Tour | Released: 9 July 2012; Label: Concert Live; Formats: CD | 78 |
| Live at Masters of Rock | Released: 1 November 2019; Label: Nuclear Blast; Formats: CD, LP | — |

=== Compilation albums ===
| Title | Album details | Peak chart positions | | |
| Title | Album details | SWI | BEL (WA) | GER |
|---|---|---|---|---|
| Slania/Evocation I – The Arcane Metal Hammer Edition | Released: 15 April 2009; Label: Nuclear Blast; Formats: CD, digital download | — | — | — |
| The Early Years | Released: 17 August 2012; Label: Nuclear Blast; Formats: CD, digital download | 18 | 134 | 67 |
| Best Of | Released: 13 August 2013; Label: Nuclear Blast; Formats: Digital download | — | — | — |
"—" denotes a recording that did not chart or was not released in that territory.

=== Demo albums ===
| Title | Album details |
|---|---|
| Vên | Released: 18 October 2003; Label: Twilight Records; Formats: CD, digital download |

== Extended plays ==
| Title | Album details |
|---|---|
| Vên | Released: 1 August 2004; Label: Fear Dark Records; Formats: CD, digital download |

== Singles ==
| Title | Year | Album |
|---|---|---|
| "Inis Mona" | 2008 | Slania |
| "Omnos" | 2009 | Evocation I: The Arcane Dominion |
| "Thousandfold" | 2010 | Everything Remains (As It Never Was) |
| "Meet the Enemy" | 2012 | Helvetios |
| "Divico" | 2012 | The Early Years |
| "King" | 2014 | Origins |
| "The Call of the Mountains" | 2014 | Origins |
| "Epona" | 2017 | Evocation II: Pantheon |
| "Lvgvs" | 2017 | Evocation II: Pantheon |
| "Rebirth" | 2017 | Ategnatos |
| "Ategnatos" | 2019 | Ategnatos |
| "Ambiramus" | 2019 | Ategnatos |
| "The Slumber" | 2019 | Ategnatos |
| "Worship" | 2019 | Ategnatos |
| "Aidus" | 2022 | Ànv |
| "Exile of the Gods" | 2022 | Ànv |
| "Premonition" | 2024 | Ànv |
| "The Prodigal Ones" | 2025 | Ànv |
| "Awen" | 2025 | Ànv |

== Music videos ==
| Song | Year | Director | Album |
|---|---|---|---|
| "Of Fire, Wind & Wisdom" | 2006 | — | Spirit |
| "Inis Mona" | 2008 | — | Slania |
| "Omnos" | 2009 | — | Evocation I: The Arcane Dominion |
| "Thousandfold" | 2009 | Grupa 13 | Everything Remains (As It Never Was) |
| "A Rose for Epona" | 2012 | Grupa 13 | Helvetios |
| "Havoc" | 2012 | Grupa 13 | Helvetios |
| "King" | 2014 | — | Origins |
| "The Call of the Mountains" | 2014 | — | Origins |
| "Epona" | 2017 | Jason Sereftug-Borruso | Evocation II: Pantheon |
| "Lvgvs" | 2017 | Jason Sereftug-Borruso | Evocation II: Pantheon |
| "Catvrix" | 2017 | Jason Sereftug-Borruso | Evocation II: Pantheon |
| "Rebirth" | 2017 | — | Ategnatos |
| "Ategnatos" | 2019 | — | Ategnatos |
| "Ambiramus" | 2019 | Grupa13 | Ategnatos |
| "The Slumber" | 2019 | Chrigel Glanzmann | Ategnatos |
| "Worship" | 2019 | Chrigel Glanzmann | Ategnatos |
| "Aidus" | 2022 | Marcus Overbeck and Michael Jörg | Ànv |
| "Exile of the Gods" | 2022 | Marcus Overbeck and Michael Jörg | Ànv |
| "Premonition" | 2024 | Mirko Witzki | Ànv |
| "The Prodigal Ones" | 2025 | Sebastian Pielnik | Ànv |
| "Awen" | 2025 | Mirko Witzki | Ànv |
