= Kirder =

Kirder is a surname. Notable people with the surname include:

- Rafi Kirder (born 1980), Swiss musician
- Sevan Kirder (born 1980), Swiss musician
