= Fräkmündt =

Swiss music project

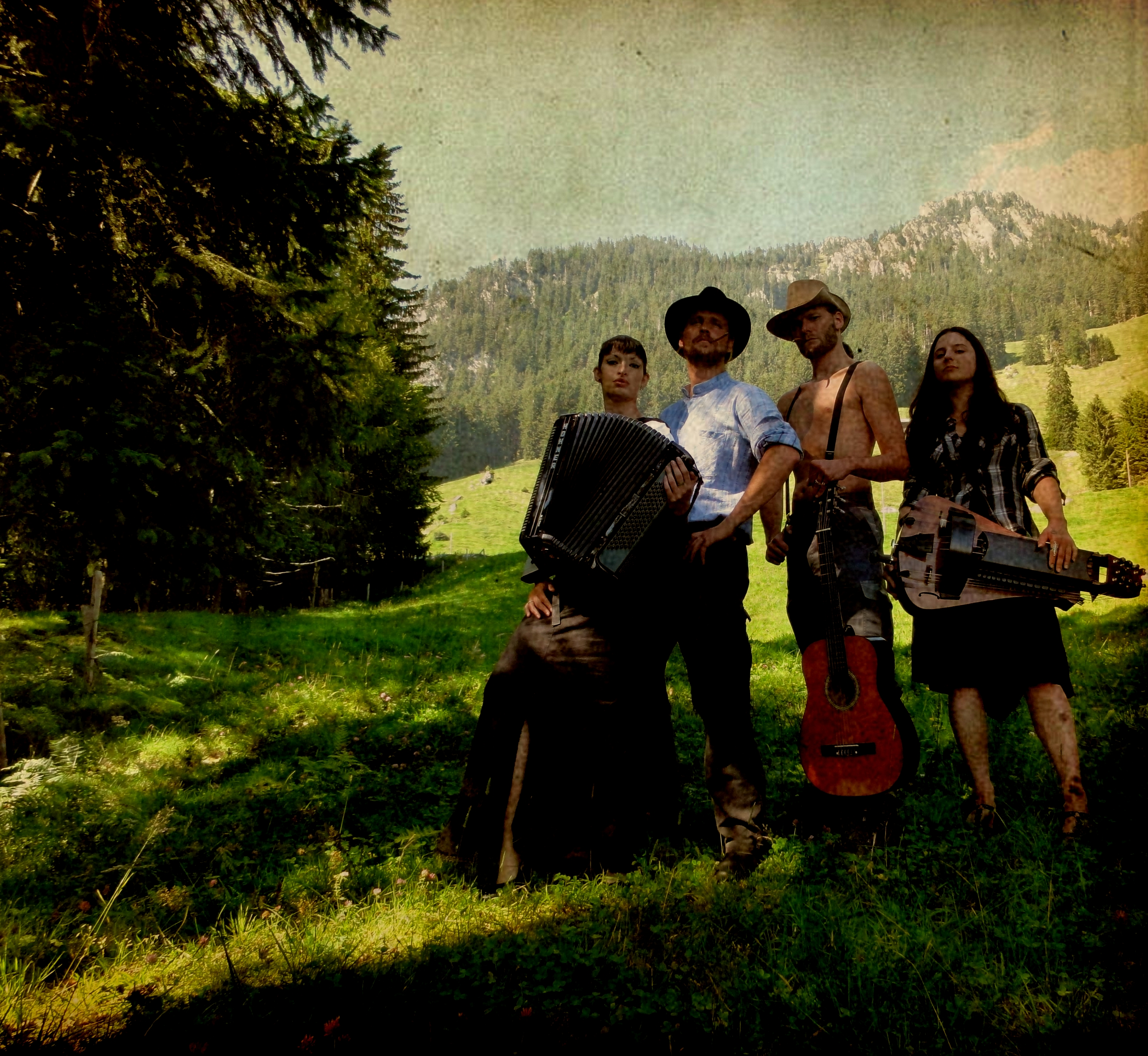

Background information
- Origin: Lucerne, Switzerland
- Genres: Folk
- Years active: 2009–present
- Labels: Auerbach / Prophecy Productions
- Members: Anneli, Käthi, Guschti, Res, Hans Hagu, Ursula Schälle
- Website: fraekmuendt.wordpress.com

Fräkmündt is a folk music project from Central Switzerland. The band calls its musical style "Ur-Folk". They re-interpret old folk songs of their region and create new songs based on legends, stories and the iconic landscape of central Switzerland. The music consists of elements of traditional Volksmusik from Switzerland as well as folk music from other regions, but also many other different styles of music. The project thus follows the old spirit of Swiss folk music, that has always been a constantly changing and growing mixture of different influences paired with local folklore. The lyrics are written and performed in the local High Alemannic German dialect. Since their formation in 2009, Fräkmündt have managed to get the attention of an international audience and their albums were positively reviewed in several countries.

The denomination Fräkmündt was the old name of Mount Pilatus, a mysterious mountain range near Lucerne.

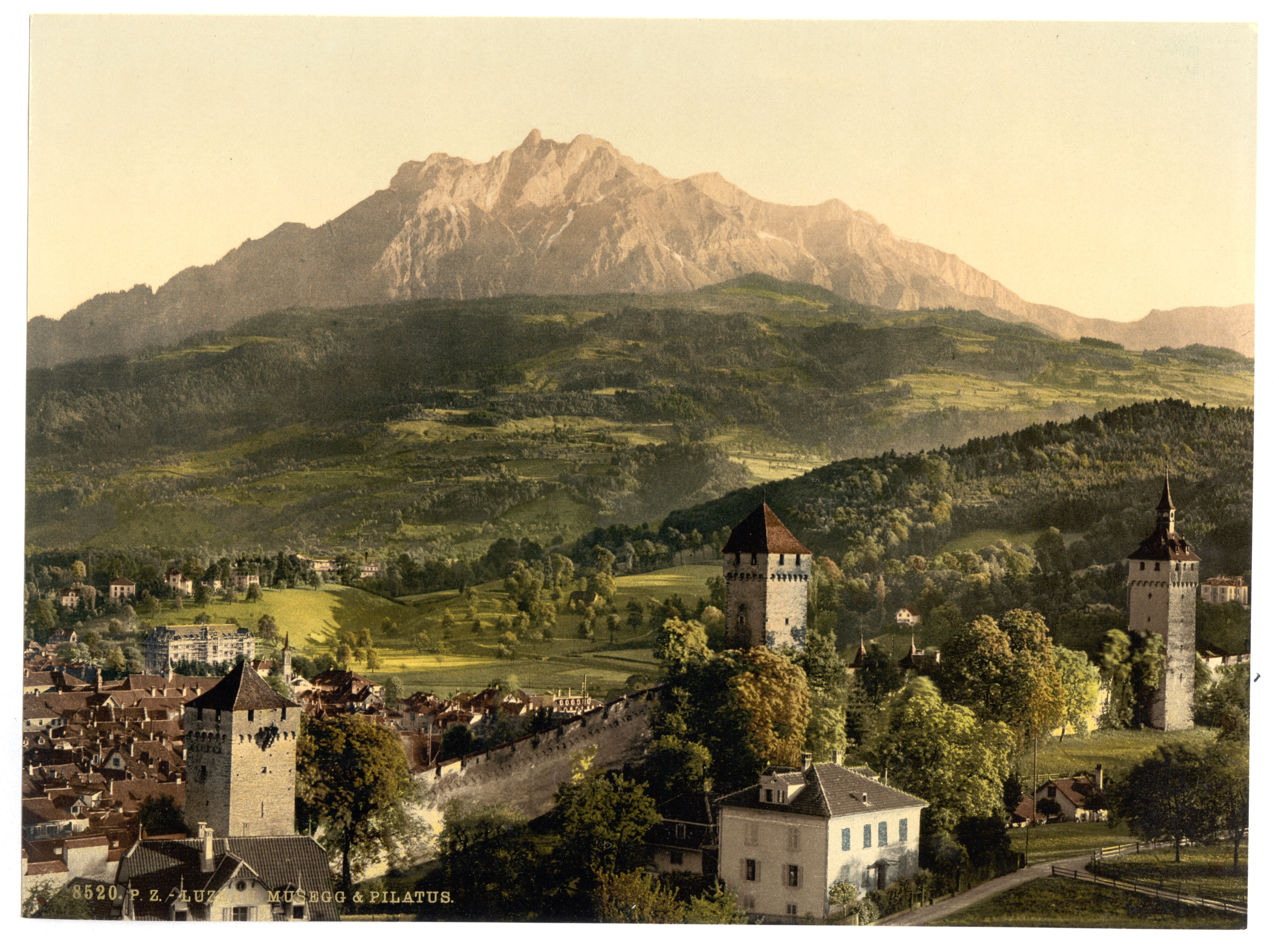
Mount Pilatus seen from Lucerne, c. 1895

== History ==
Fräkmündt was founded in 2009 by Käthi, Chregu and Res. In 2010, they released a demo tape called Losid vo Bärge ond Tal, as well as their debut album: Urbärglieder. The same year, hurdy-gurdy player Anneli (Anna Murphy) became a member of the band.

With the song "D'Draachejongfer", Fräkmündt took part in the 2010 pre-selection for the Eurovision Song Contest 2011, but did not make it to the finals. Soon thereafter, they released the conceptual EP Uufwärts e d'Föuse, bärgwärts e d'Rueh. In 2011 Guschti, who was previously a session guitar player, became a permanent member of the band. At the end of the same year the second full length Heiwehland, which translates to Land of Nostalgia was released. Merlin Sutter (Eluveitie) recorded the drums for the entire album and guest vocals were provided by Chrigel Glanzmann (Eluveitie) and the opera singer Christiane Boesiger.

In 2012, Chregu left the band, while in 2013 Hans Hagu (drums) and Ursula Schälle (cowbells) joined. In 2013, Fräkmündt changed labels and signed with Auerbach Tonträger, a sub-label of Prophecy Productions, where their newest album, Landlieder & Frömdländler, was released as a digi-CD, vinyl version with poster and a limited book version with a bonus CD.

Fräkmündt logotype

== Discography ==
- 2010: Losid vo Bärge ond Tal (self released)
- 2010: Urbärglieder (Steinklang/Percht, re-released on Auerbach/Prophecy)
- 2010: Uufwärts e d'Föuse, bärgwärts e d'Rueh (Steinklang/Percht, re-released on Auerbach/Prophecy)
- 2011: Heiwehland (Steinklang/Percht, re-released on Auerbach/Prophecy)
- 2014: Landlieder & Frömdländler (Auerbach/Prophecy)

== Contributions for compilations ==
- 2010: Oak Folk (Steinklang/Ahnstern, with the song Eiche, Tüüfu, Geissebueb)
- 2011: Mit fester Hand - Allerseelenlieder (Steinklang/Ahnstern, with the song Firnföuskamerad)

== Members ==
- Res – vocals, jaw harp, harmonica, percussion
- Anneli – hurdy-gurdy, whistles, bass, vocals
- Käthi – accordion
- Guschti – guitar
- Hans Hagu – drums
- Ursula Schälle – cowbells
