= Cellar Darling =

Swiss progressive metal band

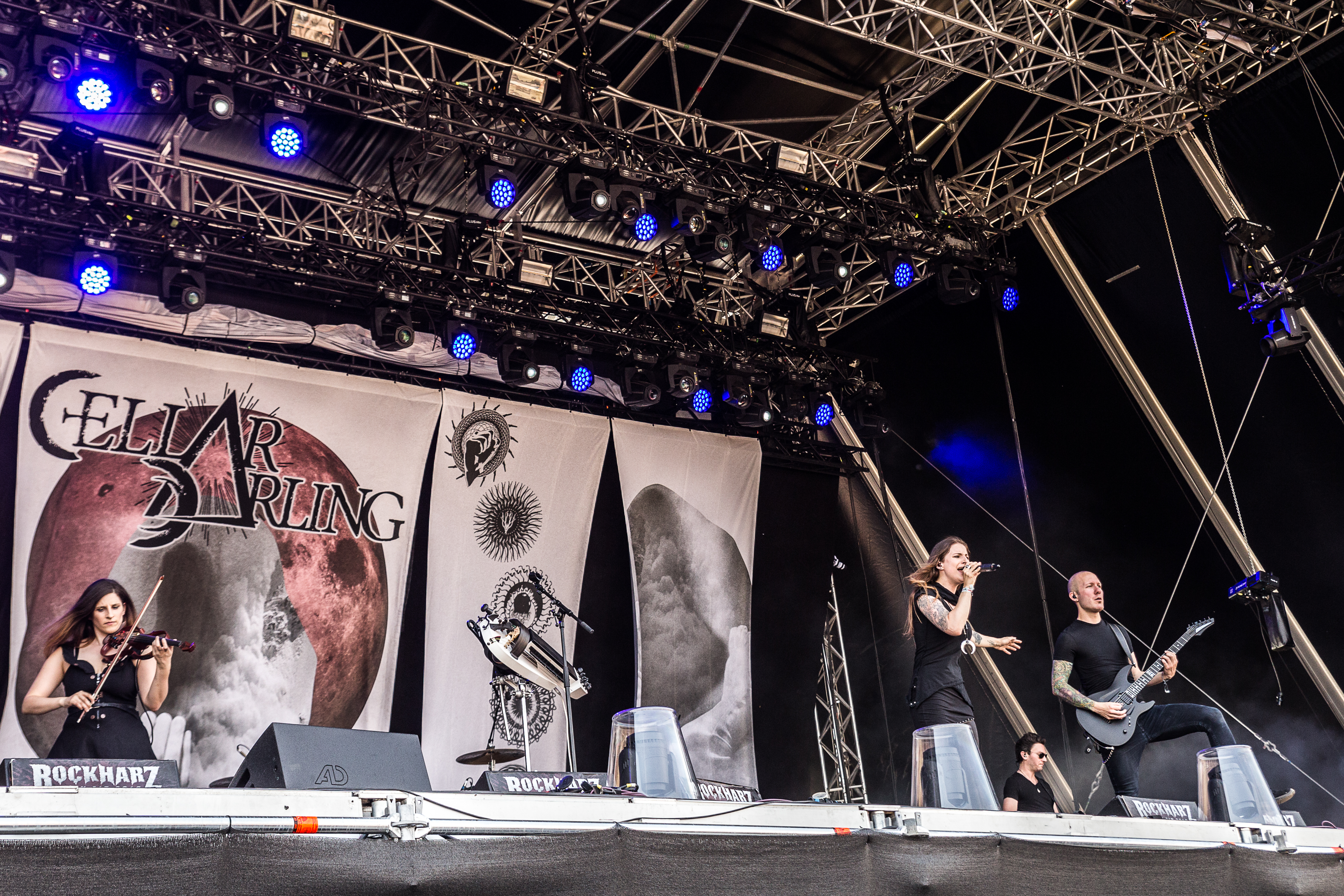
- Cellar Darling performing at Rockharz Open Air 2018

Background information
- Origin: Winterthur and Lucerne, Switzerland
- Genres: Progressive metal, folk metal
- Years active: 2016–present
- Label: Nuclear Blast
- Members: Merlin Sutter; Ivo Henzi; Anna Murphy
- Website: cellardarling.com

Cellar Darling are a three-piece Swiss progressive metal band from Winterthur and Lucerne, founded in 2016. The group was formed by Anna Murphy (vocals, hurdy-gurdy, flute), Merlin Sutter (drums) and Ivo Henzi (guitars and bass). Cellar Darling incorporates heavy metal, folk, classical, and progressive influences. Notably, the band uses a hurdy-gurdy and a transverse flute. The trio were previously part of the Swiss metal band Eluveitie.

== History ==
=== Formation ===
In May 2016, three longtime members of Eluveitie announced their departure from the band. Anna Murphy (singer and hurdy-gurdy player), Ivo Henzi (guitarist), and Merlin Sutter (drummer) parted ways with Eluveitie in a highly publicised split. The details of the split were not cited in the press, but speculation ensued among fans. In June 2016 the trio announced the creation of Cellar Darling. The band quickly began working on new music for their debut release.

On 23 September 2016, Cellar Darling launched a single called "Challenge" along with the B-side track "Fire, Wind & Earth". The single was self released and the video was created and directed by the band themselves. The musical style of the initial release was a concrete departure from the folk metal genre of their previous band. Cellar Darling played their first shows in December 2016, supporting Amorphis in Zurich, Switzerland and The Gentle Storm in Amsterdam, the Netherlands.

=== This Is The Sound and signing to Nuclear Blast ===
In January 2017, the trio announced their signing to German independent metal label Nuclear Blast Records, and that their debut album would be released through the label the following summer.

In May, it was announced that Cellar Darling's first album would be titled This Is the Sound and was to be released on 30 June 2017. A track list of the album was introduced.

Cellar Darling released their second single, "Black Moon", on 19 May 2017, along with a music video. This was followed on 17 June 2017 with a third single, "Avalanche". Both videos were shot in Tenerife.

The debut album was released on 30 June 2017 to widespread critical acclaim.

=== The Spell ===
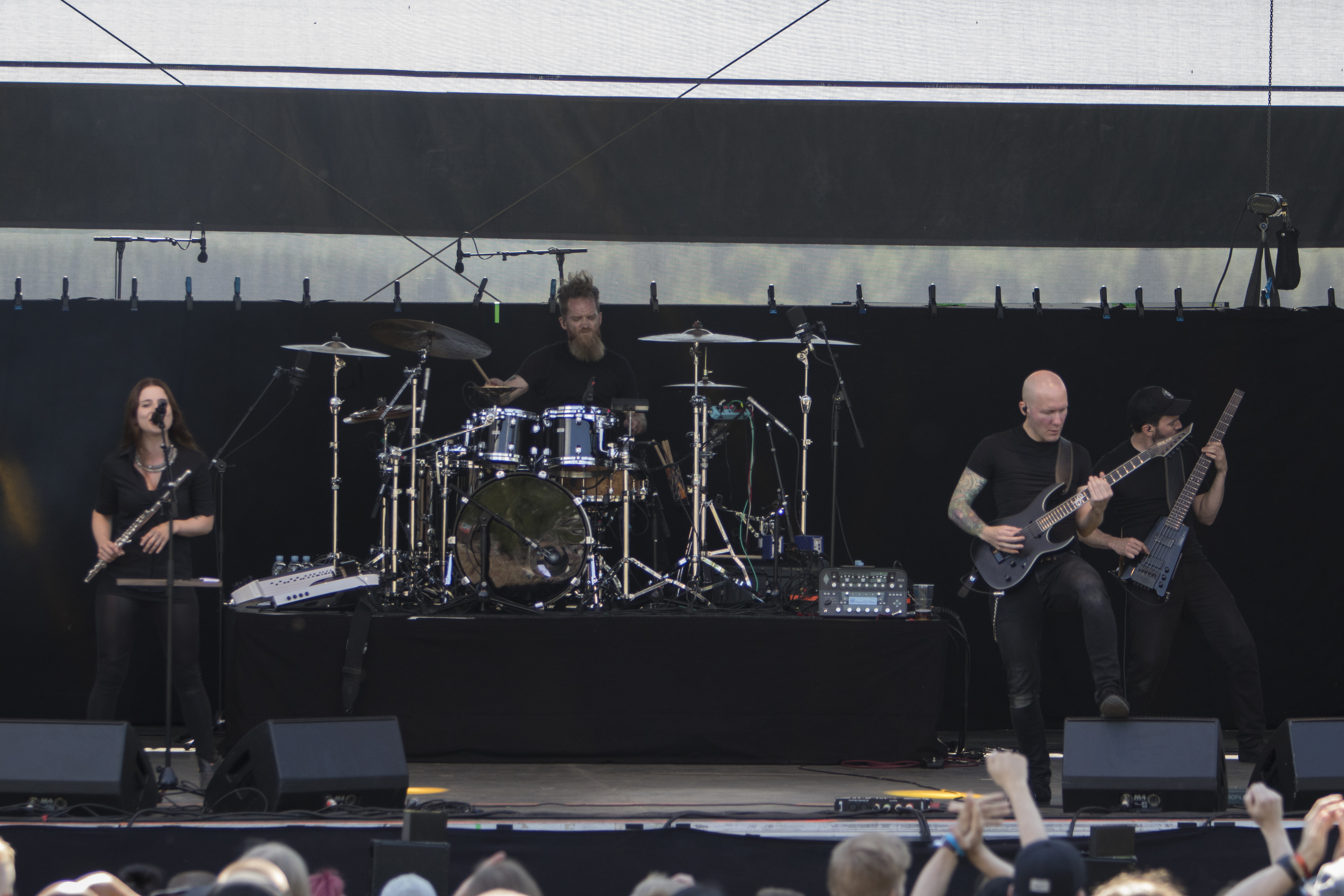
Cellar Darling performing in 2019

On 2 November 2018, "Insomnia" was released, accompanied by a music video created by Costin Chioreanu.

Cellar Darling's second album, The Spell, was released on 22 March 2019 on Nuclear Blast Records. The Spell is a concept album telling a story of "an unnamed girl who is birthed into a world that is full of pain, damaged and debilitated by the human beings that inhabit it".

=== "Dance" ===
On 23 March 2021, the single and music video for "Dance" was released. Although it was originally meant to be part of The Spell, the song was rewritten in 2020 and released alongside a music video.

"Inspiration came from two sources: the dancing plague of 1518, which is a fascinating story in itself, and an engagement with our contemporary world: doesn't it sometimes feel like we're in the process of dancing ourselves to death?"

== Members ==
- Anna Murphy – lead vocals, hurdy-gurdy, flute, keyboards (2016–present)
- Ivo Henzi – guitars, bass (2016–present)
- Merlin Sutter – drums (2016–present)

=== Live musicians ===
- Nicolas Winter – bass (2017–present)
- Rafi Kirder – bass (2016)
- Rachel G – bass (U.S. tour 2022)

=== Guest musicians ===
- Shir-Ran Yinon – violin (2016–2018)
- Brendan Wade – uilleann pipes (2016–2017)
- Fredy Schnyder – piano (2016–2017)

== Discography ==
=== Albums ===
- This Is the Sound (2017)
- The Spell (2019)

=== Singles ===
- "Challenge" (2016)
- "Avalanche" (2017)
- "Black Moon" (2017)
- "Insomnia" (2018)
- "Dance" (2021)

=== Music videos ===
- Challenge
- Black Moon
- Avalanche
- Six days
- Insomnia
- The Spell
- Death
- Drown
- Dance
