= ANV =

ANV may refer to:

- Acción Nacionalista Vasca (a historical Basque nationalist party)
- Anticipatory nausea and vomiting, a common consequence of cancer treatment (see: Cancer and nausea § Anticipatory)
- Army of Northern Virginia
- Anvik Airport in Anvik, Alaska (IATA Code: ANV)
- Ànv, a 2025 album by Swiss folk metal band Eluveitie
