= Sevan Kirder =

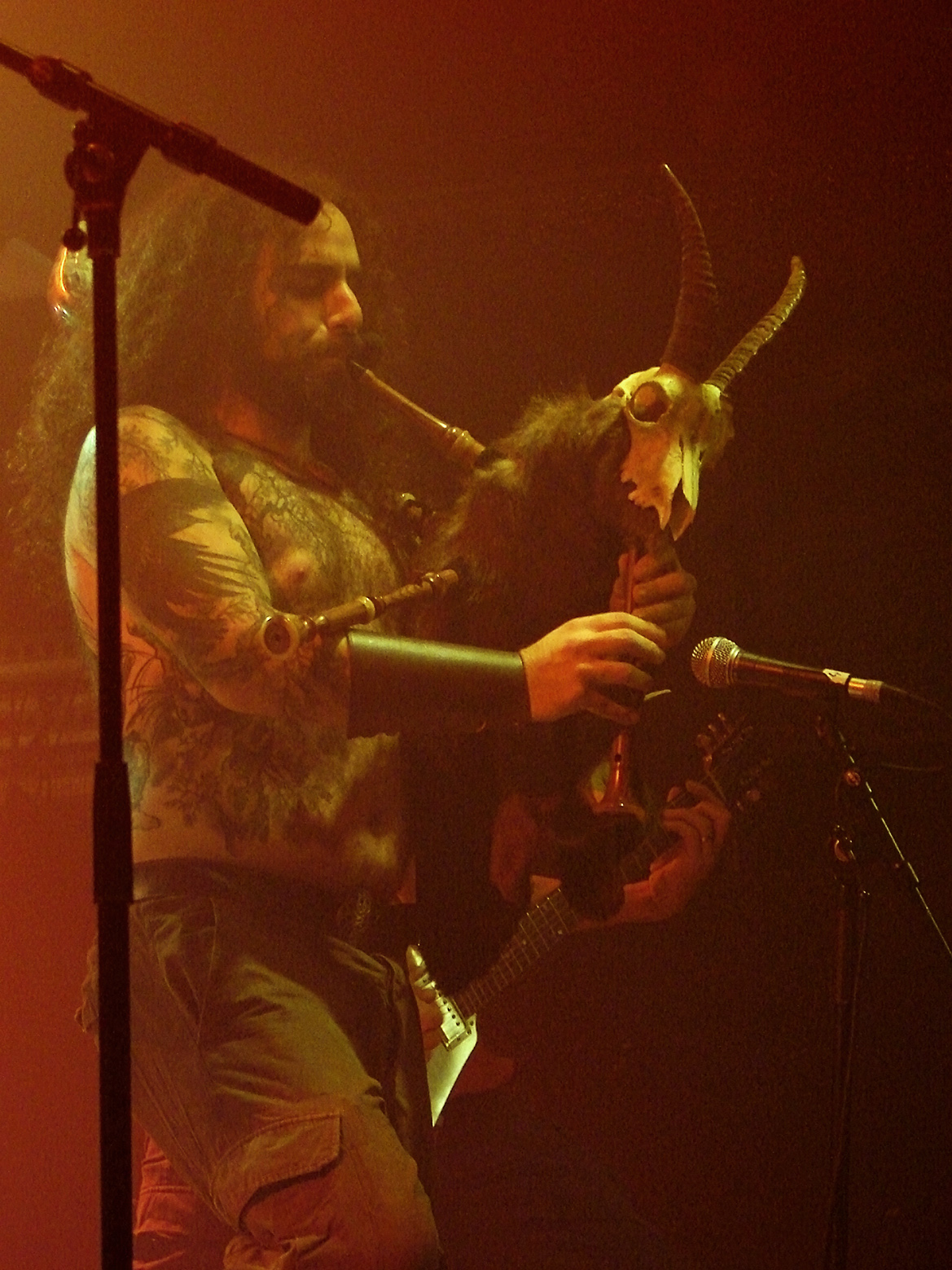
- Kirder in 2007

Background information
- Born: 9 February 1980 (age 46)
- Origin: Baden, Switzerland
- Genres: Folk metal Celtic Folk
- Instruments: flute, tinwhistle, bagpipes,
- Labels: Zytglogge, Nuclear Blast
- Website: Red Shamrock's Website; Eluveitie's Website

Sevan Kirder (born 9 February 1980) is the flutist/bagpiper for the Swiss band Red Shamrock (Celtic Folk). He hosts a Boardgame Podcast since April 2019 "Der Brettspiele Podcast, den die Welt nicht braucht".

== Career ==
He is best known for his work with folk metal band Eluveitie which he left on 4 June 2008.

== Privates ==
Sevan played a long time in Eluveitie with his twinbrother Rafi and he is of Armenian descent.

== Equipment ==
- Flute Pearl PF-501
- Irish Flute by Thomas Aebi
- Tin/Lowwhistle by Susato
- Galician Bagpipe by Seivane
- E-Pipe by redpipes

== Discography ==
=== With Eluveitie ===
- Vên (2003) – EP
- Spirit (2006) – CD
- Slania (2008) – CD
- Live at Metalcamp – (2008) – CD
- Slania / Evocation I – The Arcane Metal Hammer Edition – (2009) – CD
- The Early Years – (2012) – CD

=== With Red Shamrock ===
- Mosaic / Mirror (2003) – EP
- as hot as irish... (2004) – CD
- from the ashes (2006) – CD
- desert snow (2008) – CD
- deman's playground (2012) – CD
- Thunder Sails the Sea (2016) – CD

=== With Inish ===
- the calm before the storm (2008) – CD

=== With Finsterforst ===
- Weltenkraft (2007) – CD
- ...zum Tode hin (2008) – CD
- Rastlos (2012) – CD
- Mach Dich Frei (2015) – CD
- #YØLØ (2016) – EP
- Zerfall (2019) – CD
- Jenseits (2023) – EP

=== With Bulwark ===
- Variance (2009) – CD

=== With Minhyriath ===
- Grohnd (2009) – CD

=== With Windfærer ===
- Tribus (2010) – CD

In addition to his work with traditional bands, Sevan Kirder is also active in several concept-based AI music projects. These include the glam rock act Rozee Kyler, the 80s-inspired heavy metal band Shadowfront, and the progressive metal project Thalassor. All feature AI-generated vocals and compositions, co-created with artificial intelligence tools and released via YouTube.

=== With Rozee Kyler ===
- The Amok Diaries (2024) (Crowman Saga pt. I)
- The Severed Veil (2024) (Crowman Saga pt. II)
- The Unseen Witness (2024) (Crowman Saga pt. III)
- The Rize and Fall (2025) (Crowman Saga pt. IV)

=== With Shadowfront ===
- The Dark Decade (2024) (about 80's geopolitics)
- Aeons of Glory (2025) (about Wonders of the World)
- Spectral Horizons (2025) (about Spirit_(supernatural_entity) of the World)
- Of Fire and Flood (2025) (about Disasters of the World)
- Forbidden Gates (2025) (about Hidden/Forbidden/Sacred Places of the World)
- Primordial Spawn (2025) (about Legendary Monsters of the World)
- Unsealed Relics (2025) (about Legendary Relics of the World)
- Codex Paradox (2025) (about Legendary Scriptures of the World)
- The Dark Decade II (2025) (about 90's geopolitics)
- The Dark Decade III (2025) (about 00's geopolitics)

=== With Thalassor ===
- Eidolon of the Sea (2024) (based on Twenty_Thousand_Leagues_Under_the_Seas)
- Ethereal Descent (2025) (based on Inferno_(Dante))
- The Infinite Cycle Pt. I (2025) (based on The_Neverending_Story)
- The Infinite Cycle Pt. II (2025) (based on The_Neverending_Story)
- Eternal Now (2025) (based on Momo_(novel))
- Universal Bio-Interference Kit (2025) (based on Ubik)
- Corpus Ex Nihilo (2025) (based on Solaris (novel))
- empathy.exe (2025) (based on Do_Androids_Dream_of_Electric_Sheep)
- The End Is Nigh (2025) (based on Watchmen)
- Vermillion Verdict (2025) (based on V for Vendetta)
- Ethereal Descent - Revisited - (2025) (based on Inferno_(Dante))
- Eidolon of the Sea - Revisited - (2025) (based on Twenty_Thousand_Leagues_Under_the_Seas)
- The Infinite Cycle - Revisited - (2026) (based on The_Neverending_Story)

=== With Սեփ-Սեւ ===
- Andrashkharh (2026) (based on Armenian Folklore)
