= Slania/Evocation I – The Arcane Metal Hammer Edition =

Compilation album by Eluveitie
- Released: 15 April 2009
- Recorded: 2008–2009
- Genre: Folk metal, melodic death metal, Celtic metal
- Length: 73:37
- Label: Nuclear Blast

Eluveitie compilation album chronology
Slania/Evocation I – The Arcane Metal Hammer Edition (2009)	The Early Years (2012)

Slania/Evocation I – The Arcane Metal Hammer Edition is the first compilation album by Swiss folk metal band Eluveitie.

== History ==
It was released in Germany on 15 April 2009 through Nuclear Blast as bonus of the May Edition from the Metal Hammer magazine. The release is an exclusive release for Metal Hammer magazine and is not easy to find in record stores, but it is possible.

== Track listing ==
1. "The Arcane Dominion" - 5:41
2. "Gray Sublime Archon" - 4:22
3. "Brictom" - 4:22
4. "Inis Mona (including live intro)" - 4:42
5. "Memento" - 3:20
6. "Bloodstained Ground" - 3:20
7. "Within the Grove" - 1:52
8. "The Cauldron of Renascence" - 2:02
9. "The Somber Lay" - 3:59
10. "Omnos" - 3:48
11. "Slania's Song" - 5:41
12. "Voveso in Mori" - 4:07
13. "Slania (Folk Medley)" - 1:52

== Credits ==
- Anna Murphy – hurdy-gurdy
- Chrigel Glanzmann – tin and low whistles, uilleann pipes, acoustic guitar, bodhràn, vocals
- Ivo Henzi – guitar
- Simeon Koch – guitar, vocals
- Meri Tadic – violin, vocals
- Kay Brem – bass
- Merlin Sutter – drums
- Päde Kistler - tin and low whistles, gaita and other bagpipes
- Rafi Kirder – bass
- Sevan Kirder – tin and low whistles, gaita

All music arranged by Eluveitie
