= This Is the Sound =

Studio album by Cellar Darling
- Released: 30 June 2017
- Recorded: New Sound Studio in Pfäffikon, Zürich, Switzerland
- Genre: Progressive metal, folk metal
- Length: 59:52
- Label: Nuclear Blast
- Producer: Tommy Vetterli

Cellar Darling chronology
This Is the Sound (2017)	The Spell (2019)

Singles from This Is the Sound
- 1. "Challenge" Released: 23 September 2016; 2. "Black Moon" Released: 19 May 2017; 3. "Avalanche" Released: 17 June 2017

This Is the Sound is the first studio album by the Swiss progressive metal band Cellar Darling. It was released on 30 June 2017 by Nuclear Blast.

== Reception ==
This Is the Sound received positive reviews by critics upon release.

Writing for Heavy, Dave Griffiths wrote, "This Is the Sound is a modern day work of art. The three talented musicians behind Cellar Darling have just raised the bar in the Celtic/Folk Metal world to a whole new level." Charlotte Ekin from Distorted Sound magazine also gave a positive review writing, "This Is the Sound is a great example of what can be made when certain elements from genres collide and risks are taken."

== Track listing ==
All lyrics written by Anna Murphy. All music by Anna Murphy, Ivo Henzi & Merlin Sutter.

No.	Title	Length
1.	"Avalanche"	4:08
2.	"Black Moon"	4:12
3.	"Challenge"	3:38
4.	"Hullaballoo"	3:35
5.	"Six Days"	5:49
6.	"The Hermit"	3:16
7.	"Water"	1:54
8.	"Fire, Wind & Earth"	4:41
9.	"Rebels"	5:34
10.	"Under the Oak Tree..."	4:13
11.	"...High Above These Crowns"	2:45
12.	"Starcrusher"	3:20
13.	"Hedonia"	7:28
14.	"Redemption"	5:19
Total length:		59:52

Limited edition bonus tracks
No.	Title	Writer(s)	Length
15.	"The Cold Song"	John Dryden, Henry Purcell	4:06
16.	"Mad World"	Roland Orzabal	3:23
17.	"The Prophet's Song"	Brian May	7:25
Total length:			74:43

== Personnel ==
=== Musicians ===
- Anna Murphy – vocals, hurdy-gurdy, flute, keyboards
- Ivo Henzi – guitars, bass guitar
- Merlin Sutter – drums

== Chart performance ==
Chart (2017)	Peak; position
German Albums (Offizielle Top 100)	88
Swiss Albums (Schweizer Hitparade)	16
UK Rock & Metal Albums (OCC)	19
UK Independent Albums (OCC)	47
