= Rafi Kirder =

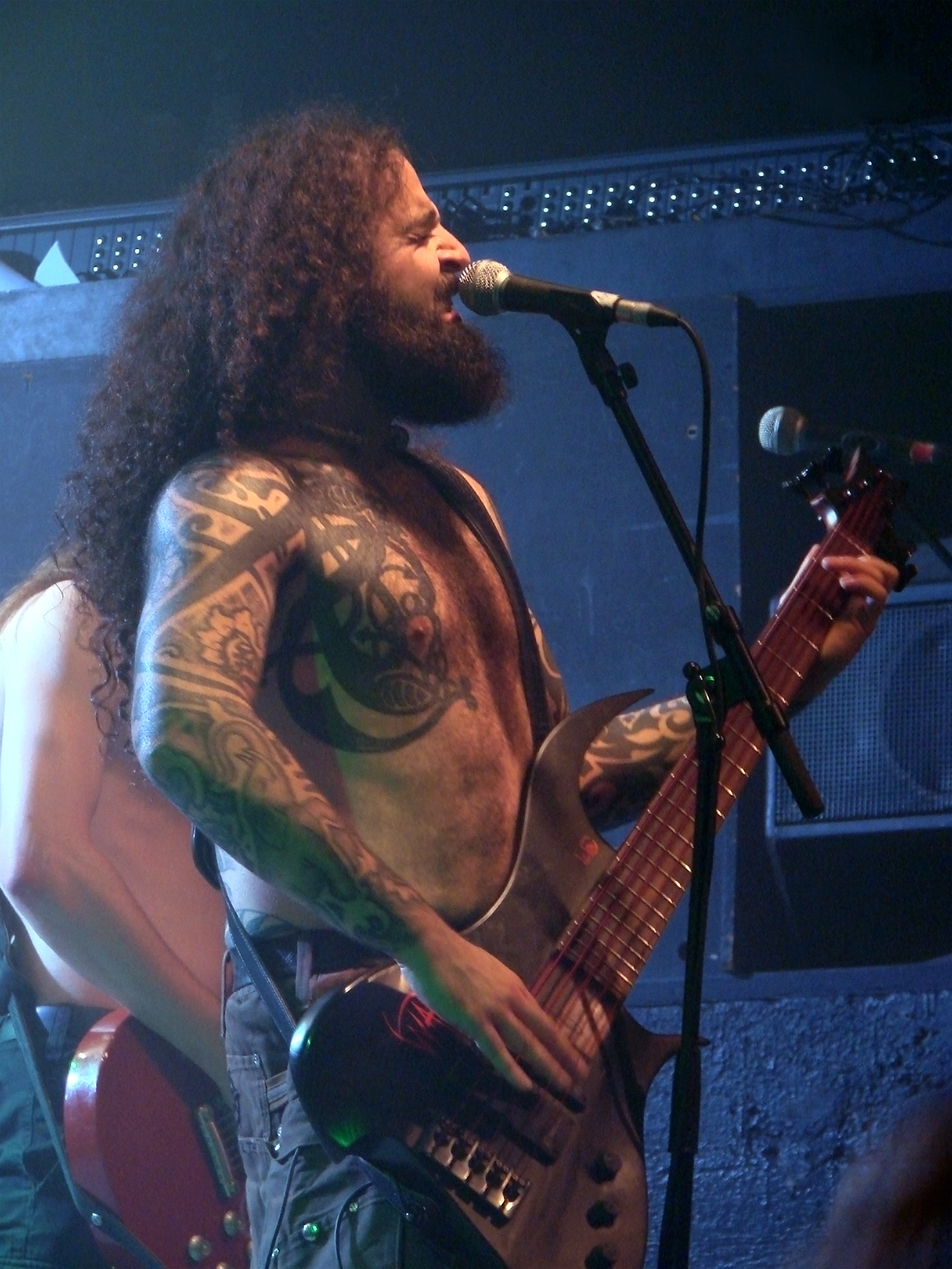
- Kirder in 2007

Background information
- Born: 9 February 1980 (age 45)
- Origin: Baden, Switzerland
- Genres: Folk metal Celtic Folk; Rock Music; Americana
- Instrument(s): bass guitar, drums, double bass, irish bouzouki
- Labels: Zytglogge, Nuclear Blast
- Website: Deathrope's Website; Red Shamrock's Website; Eluveitie's Website

Rafi Kirder is the bassist and vocalist for the Swiss band Deathrope under his alter persona Richland K. Harper.

== Career ==
Kirder is best known for having been the bassist for the Swiss folk metal band Eluveitie, which he left on 4 June 2008.

== Family ==
Rafi Kirder played a long time in Eluveitie and Red Shamrock with his twin brother Sevan and is of Armenian descent.

== Discography ==
=== With Eluveitie ===
- Vên (2003) – EP
- Spirit (2006) – CD
- Slania (2008) – CD
- Live at Metalcamp – (2008) – CD
- Slania / Evocation I – The Arcane Metal Hammer Edition – (2009) – CD
- The Early Years – (2012) – CD
- Slania – 10 Years (2018) – CD

=== With Red Shamrock ===
- Mosaic / Mirror (2003) – EP
- …as hot as irish (2004) – CD
- from the ashes (2006) – CD
- desert snow (2008) – CD
- deman's playground (2012) – CD

=== With Deathrope ===
- Bloody Tales (2009) – EP
- Hang 'em High (2010) – CD
- GO! (2014) – CD
- Love Hz (2017) – CD
- Rams & Roaches (2020) – CD

=== With Inish ===
- jewels of the ocean (2006) – CD
- the calm before the storm (2008) – CD
- welcome home (2018) – CD
