= Anna Murphy (musician) =

Swiss musician and audio engineer

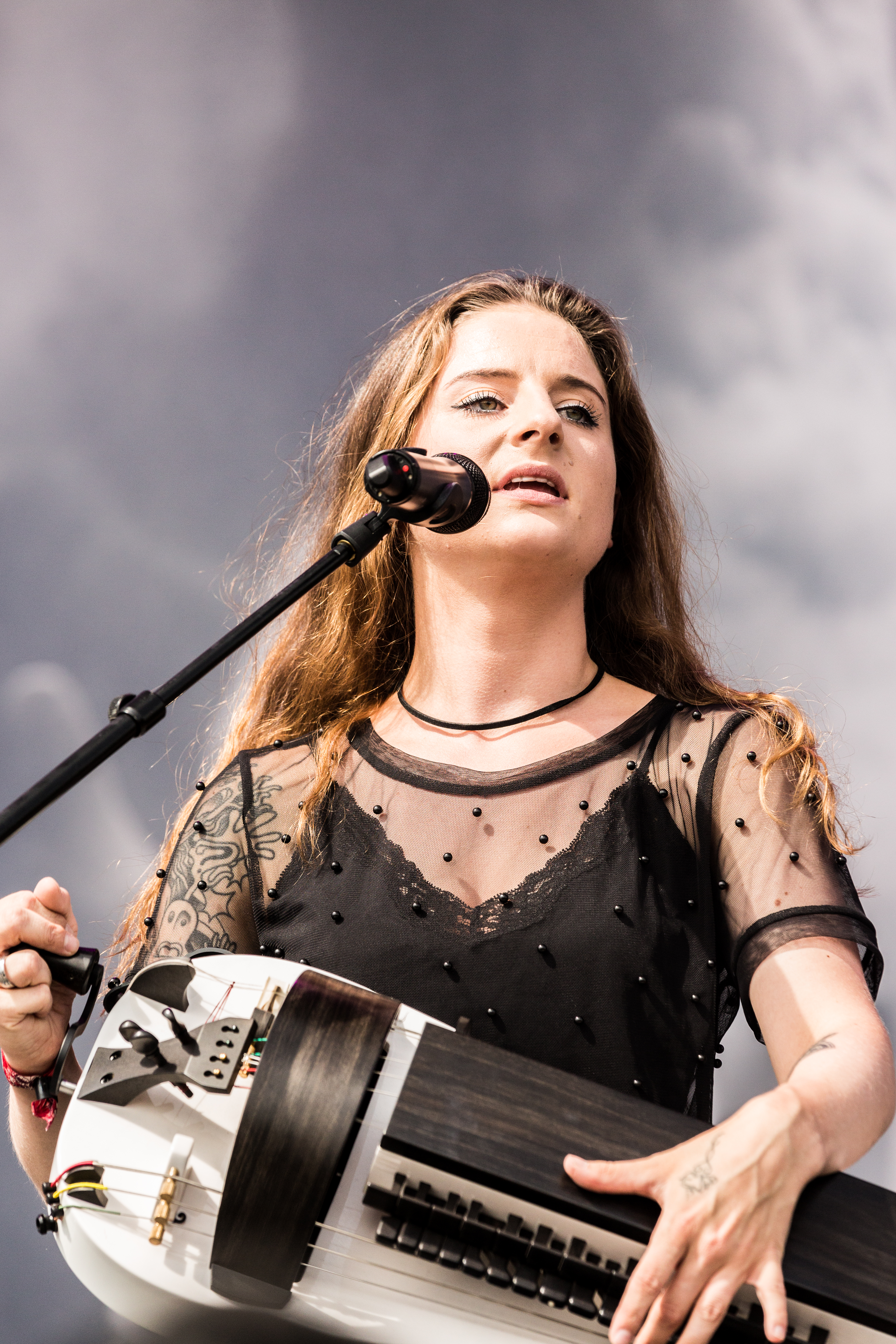
- Murphy at Summer Breeze Open Air on 18 August 2017

Background information
- Born: Anna Maria Murphy; 10 August 1989 (age 36); Lucerne, Switzerland
- Genres: Folk metal; melodic death metal; Celtic metal; progressive metal
- Occupations: Musician; singer; songwriter; audio engineer
- Instruments: Hurdy-gurdy; vocals; flute; keyboards; bass
- Years active: 2005–present
- Label: Nuclear Blast
- Member of: Cellar Darling; Fräkmündt; Maer
- Formerly of: Eluveitie; Nucleus Torn
- Website: https://annamurphy.ch

Anna Maria Murphy (born 10 August 1989) is a Swiss musician, singer, songwriter and audio engineer. She is best known as the female lead vocalist of Swiss folk metal band Eluveitie from 2006 until 2016, in which she also played hurdy-gurdy and flute. Since her departure from Eluveitie, she has been the lead vocalist of Swiss progressive metal band Cellar Darling.

== Early life ==
Anna Murphy was born 10 August 1989 in Lucerne, Switzerland. Her father, Andrew Murphy, is a Dublin-born Irishman and her mother, Christiane Boesiger, is a native Swiss. Because both of her parents work in Switzerland as professional opera singers, she came in contact with music in her early childhood years.

== Music career ==
In 2006, at the age of 16, she became the hurdy-gurdy player of the Swiss folk metal band Eluveitie. It provided a certain Celtic feel to the band.

In early 2010, Murphy formed, together with fellow Eluveitie member Meri Tadic, the ambient project godnr.universe!. By the end of the year, she also joined the folk group Fräkmündt (named after the ancient name of Mount Pilatus), which was one of the national contestants of the Eurovision Song Contest in 2011. In the end, their song D'Draachejongfer could not beat In Love for a While (a song by Anna Rossinelli). Since the spring of 2011, Murphy worked as an audio engineer at the Obernauer Soundfarm Studios in Lucerne. In that same year, she also became a permanent member of the band Nucleus Torn.

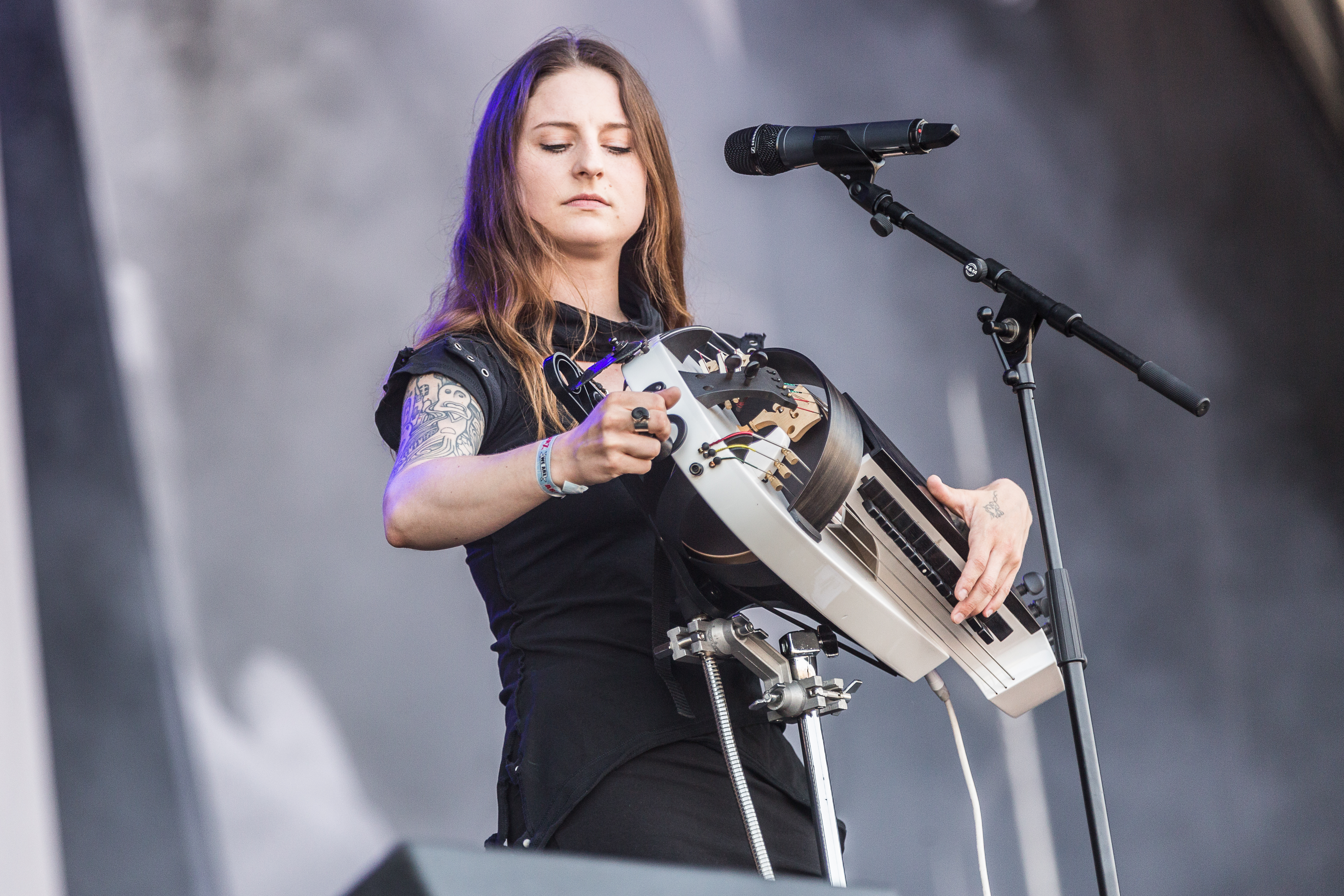
Anna Murphy performing with Cellar Darling at Rockharz festival 2018.

She left Eluveitie on 5 May 2016, following Ivo Henzi and Merlin Sutter and starting a new band with them. This band is called Cellar Darling after her solo album.

In August 2022, Maer, a side project formed by Murphy and Marjana Semkina of Iamthemorning was announced.

== Discography ==
=== With Eluveitie ===
==== Studio albums ====
- Slania (2008)
- Evocation I: The Arcane Dominion (2009)
- Everything Remains (As It Never Was) (2010)
- Helvetios (2012)
- Origins (2014)

=== With godnr.universe! ===
- godnr.universe! (2010)

=== With Fräkmündt ===
- Uufwärts e d'Föuse, bärgwärts e d'Rueh (2010)
- Heiwehland (2011)
- Landlieder & Frömdländler (2014)

=== With Nucleus Torn ===
- Golden Age (2011)
- Street Lights Fail (2014)

=== With Lethe ===
- When Dreams Become Nightmares (2014)
- The First Corpse on the Moon (2017)
- Alienation (2022)

=== With Cellar Darling ===
- This Is the Sound (2017)
- The Spell (2019)

=== With Maer ===
- Sister (2022)

=== Solo work ===
==== Studio albums ====
- Cellar Darling (2013)

=== Guest appearances ===
- Holy Grail – Crisis in Utopia (2010)
- Swashbuckle – Crime Always Pays (2010)
- Varg – Wolfskult (2011)
- Status Minor – Ouroboros (2011)
- Blutmond – Revolution Is Dead (2012)
- Haïrdrÿer – Off to Haïradise (2014)
- Varg – Rotkäppchen (2015)
- Back to Life – A Tribute to Goodbye to Gravity (2016)
- Evenmore – Last Ride (2016)
- Varg – Das Ende aller Lügen (2016)
- Folkestone – Ossidiana (2017)
- Leah – Ancient Winter (2018)
- Appearance of Nothing – In Times of Darkness (2019)
- Wear Your Sins – Orpheus Omega (2019)
- Paydretz – Chroniques de l'insurrection (2021)
- Valhalore - Beyond the Stars (2025)
