= The Spell (Cellar Darling album) =

Studio album by Cellar Darling
- Released: 22 March 2019
- Studio: New Sound Studio in Pfäffikon, Zürich, Switzerland
- Genre: Progressive metal, folk metal
- Length: 63:17
- Label: Nuclear Blast
- Producer: Tommy Vetterli

Cellar Darling chronology
This Is the Sound (2017)	The Spell (2019)

Singles from The Spell
- 1. "Insomnia" Released: 2 November 2018

The Spell is the second studio album by the Swiss progressive metal band Cellar Darling. It was released on 22 March 2019 by Nuclear Blast.

== Track listing ==
No.	Title	Length
1.	"Pain"	4:27
2.	"Death"	7:14
3.	"Love"	5:11
4.	"The Spell"	4:41
5.	"Burn"	5:08
6.	"Hang"	4:33
7.	"Sleep"	3:48
8.	"Insomnia"	6:52
9.	"Freeze"	3:37
10.	"Fall"	0:59
11.	"Drown"	7:11
12.	"Love, Pt. II"	5:01
13.	"Death, Pt. II"	4:35
Total length:		1:03:17

Stories (Limited Edition Bonus Tracks)
No.	Title	Length
1.	"Pain"	2:06
2.	"Death"	1:06
3.	"Love"	1:23
4.	"The Spell"	0:48
5.	"Burn"	1:37
6.	"Hang"	1:45
7.	"Sleep"	1:30
8.	"Insomnia"	1:46
9.	"Freeze"	1:14
10.	"Fall"	0:51
11.	"Drown"	1:40
12.	"Love, Pt. II"	2:16
13.	"Death, Pt. II"	1:16
Total length:		19:13

== Personnel ==
=== Musicians ===
- Anna Murphy – vocals, hurdy-gurdy, flute, keyboards
- Ivo Henzi – guitars, bass
- Merlin Sutter – drums

== Charts ==
Chart (2019)	Peak position
German Albums (Offizielle Top 100)	66
Swiss Albums (Schweizer Hitparade)	20
