= Evocation I: The Arcane Dominion =

Studio album by Eluveitie
- Released: 17 April 2009
- Recorded: December 2008
- Genre: Acoustic rock, folk rock, Celtic rock
- Length: 50:24
- Language: Gaulish
- Label: Nuclear Blast

Eluveitie studio album chronology
| Slania (2008) | Evocation I: The Arcane Dominion (2009) | Everything Remains (As It Never Was) (2010) |

Singles from Evocation I: The Arcane Dominion
- 1. "Omnos" Released: 28 April 2009

Professional ratings
Review scores
| Source | Rating |
|---|---|
| AllMusic | 4/5 stars |
| Metal Hammer | 6/7 stars |
| Metal Temple | 8/10 stars |

Evocation I: The Arcane Dominion is the third studio album by Swiss folk metal band Eluveitie. It was released on 17 April 2009 through Nuclear Blast. Contrary to their previous works, this album is almost entirely acoustic. The vocals are primarily handled by hurdy-gurdy player Anna Murphy. The album cover represents Cernunnos, a Celtic deity of nature. The lyrics are partly based on Gaulish inscriptions, e.g. "A Girl's Oath" uses the text of the Larzac tablet, and "Dessumiis Luge" that of the Chamalières tablet.

== Background ==
Vocalist Chrigel Glanzmann has said about the album:

"As Evocation I - The Arcane Dominion is a concept album setting pure gaulish mythology into music, we also wanted the artwork to be in the same line. Kernunnos is one of the most important and central characters in celtic mythology, so we conceived a topical portrayal of that figure, representing the ancient mythological content of Evocation I: The Arcane Dominion, as well as its musical character."

== Track listing ==
| No. | Title | Writer(s) | Length |
|---|---|---|---|
| 1. | "Sacrapos - At First Glance" | Anna Murphy | 2:01 |
| 2. | "Brictom" | Chrigel Glanzmann; Jonathan Shorland | 4:22 |
| 3. | "A Girl's Oath" | Murphy | 1:18 |
| 4. | "The Arcane Dominion" | trad. | 5:43 |
| 5. | "Within the Grove" | trad. | 1:52 |
| 6. | "The Cauldron of Renascence" | Glanzmann | 2:05 |
| 7. | "Nata" | trad.; Glanzmann | 4:02 |
| 8. | "Omnos" | Glanzmann | 3:48 |
| 9. | "Carnutian Forest" | trad.; Glanzmann | 3:17 |
| 10. | "Dessumiis Luge" | Murphy; Meri Tadić | 3:28 |
| 11. | "Gobanno" | trad. | 3:15 |
| 12. | "Voveso in Mori" | Glanzmann; Murphy | 4:09 |
| 13. | "Memento" | Efrén López; Päde Kistler | 3:20 |
| 14. | "Ne Regv Na" | Glanzmann; Murphy | 5:07 |
| 15. | "Sacrapos - The Disparaging Last Gaze" | Murphy | 2:43 |
| Total length: | | | 50:24 |

Limited edition bonus tracks
| No. | Title | Length |
|---|---|---|
| 16. | "Slania" (Folk medley) | 1:53 |
| 17. | "Omnos" (Early metal version) | 3:49 |
| Total length: | | 56:06 |

Live at Summer Breeze 2008 DVD
| No. | Title | Length |
|---|---|---|
| 1. | "Inis Mona" |
| 2. | "Grey Sublime Archon" |
| 3. | "Of Fire, Wind & Wisdom" |
| 4. | "Bloodstained Ground" |
| 5. | "Slania's Song" |
| 6. | "The Somber Lay" |
| 7. | "Your Gaulish War" |
| 8. | "AnDro" |
| 9. | "Tegernakô" |
| Total length: | | 47:09 |

== Credits ==
- Chrigel Glanzmann – tin and low whistles, mandola, mandolin, uilleann pipes, bodhrán, vocals
- Anna Murphy – hurdy-gurdy, flute, lead vocals
- Ivo Henzi – acoustic guitars
- Päde Kistler – tin and low whistles, Scottish highland pipe, redpipe
- Meri Tadić – fiddle, vocals
- Kay Brem – acoustic and fretless bass
- Sime Koch – acoustic guitars
- Merlin Sutter – drums, percussion

Guest musicians

- Freddy Schnyder - hammered dulcimer on "Within the Grove" and "Gobanno"
- Mina The Fiddler - 5-stringed viola on "Within the Grove" and "Gobanno"
- Oliver s. Tyr - longnecked lute on "The Arcane Dominion"
- Alan Nemtheanga - additional voice and vocals "Sacrapos- At First Glance" and "Nata"
- Sarah Wauquiez - zugerörgeli on "Gobanno"

Production

- Arranged by Eluveitie
- Engineered by Chrigel Glanzmann and Merlin Sutter
- Mixed in January 2009 at Finnvox Studios, Helsinki, Finland by Arto Tuunela of Major Label
- Mastered in January 2009 at Finnvox Studios, Helsinki, Finland by Mika Jussila
- Produced by Arto Tuunela and Eluveitie

The drums, guitars, bass, bagpipes, fiddle, hurdy-gurdy, flute, percussion, and vocals were recorded in December 2008 at Devils Studio, Vaduz/Liechtenstein. These recordings were engineered by Merlin Sutter. The tin whistles, low whistles, mandola, mandolin, bodhran, hammered dulcimer, 5-stringed viola, zugerörgeli, and sound effects were recorded in December 2008 in Illnau Switzerland. These recordings were engineered by Chrigel Glanzmann.

== Chart performance ==
| Chart | Peak; position |
|---|---|
| German Albums (Offizielle Top 100) | 60 |
| Swiss Albums (Schweizer Hitparade) | 20 |
| French Albums (SNEP) | 195 |
