= Origins (Eluveitie album) =

Studio album by Eluveitie
- Released: 1 August 2014
- Recorded: March – April 2014
- Studio: New Sound Studio in Freienbach, Switzerland
- Genre: Folk metal, melodic death metal, Celtic metal
- Length: 57:19
- Label: Nuclear Blast
- Producer: Chrigel Glanzmann & Eluveitie with Tommy Vetterli

Eluveitie studio album chronology
Helvetios (2012)	Origins (2014)	Evocation II: Pantheon (2017)

Singles from Origins
- 1. "King" Released: 17 June 2014; 2. "The Call of the Mountains" Released: 30 July 2014

Origins is the sixth studio album by Swiss folk metal band Eluveitie. The album was released on 1 August 2014 through Nuclear Blast. It was the last album to include longtime members Anna Murphy, Ivo Henzi, Merlin Sutter and Patrick "Päde" Kistler as band members.

== Concept ==
Origins deals with the Celtic mythology, "or to be more precise, with aetiological tales from Gaul", commented vocalist and front man Chrigel Glanzmann. Glanzmann also created the album artwork for this new offering and goes on to explain: "The album cover of Origins is designed after the hammer/club-shaped 'halo' of Sucellos, as seen on a statue that was found in a shrine of a Gallo-Roman household in today's France. It was created under the scientific supervision of experts from the University of Zürich".

== Reception ==
Professional ratings
Review scores
Source	Rating
Metal Hammer (Germany)	5/7
Metal Storm	8.2/10
Revolver (magazine)	4/5 stars
RockRevolt Magazine	4.5/5 stars

Upon its release, Origins received generally positive reviews from music critics. Björn Springorum of Metal Hammer said that Origins was "their strongest album to date". Glenn Butler of Powerplay continued the praise saying "Quite simply this album is a magnificent creation from the concept through to the delivery".

== Track listing ==
All lyrics are written by Chrigel Glanzmann.

No.	Title	Music	Length
1.	"Origins" (intro)	Glanzmann	2:13
2.	"The Nameless"	Glanzmann; Ivo Henzi	4:12
3.	"From Darkness"	Glanzmann	4:11
4.	"Celtos"	Glanzmann	3:57
5.	"Virunus"	Glanzmann; Henzi	4:51
6.	"Nothing" (intermezzo)	Glanzmann	0:57
7.	"The Call of the Mountains"	Glanzmann; Henzi; Anna Murphy	4:14
8.	"Sucellos"	Glanzmann; Henzi	5:05
9.	"Inception"	Glanzmann; Henzi	3:49
10.	"Vianna"	Henzi; Murphy	3:36
11.	"The Silver Sister"	Henzi	4:15
12.	"King"	Glanzmann; Henzi	4:33
13.	"The Day of Strife"	Glanzmann; Henzi	3:49
14.	"Ogmios" (intermezzo)	Glanzmann	0:29
15.	"Carry the Torch"	Henzi	4:37
16.	"Eternity" (outro)	Glanzmann	2:34
Total length:			57:19

The Call of the Mountains – Limited mailorder edition bonus CD
No.	Title	Length
1.	"L'Appel des montagnes" (French version of "The Call of the Mountains")	4:15
2.	"Il richiamo dei monti" (Italian version of "The Call of the Mountains")	4:15
3.	"Il clom dallas muntognas" (Romansh version of "The Call of the Mountains")	4:15
4.	"De Ruef vo de Bärge" (Swiss German version of "The Call of the Mountains")	4:15
Total length:		17:00

Limited digipak and mailorder edition bonus DVD
No.	Title	Length
1.	"The Call of the Mountains" (music video)	4:15
2.	"King" (music video)	4:33
3.	"Interview"	10:00
4.	"The Uprising" (Live @ Feuertanz Festival 2013)	3:42
5.	"Uxellodunon" (Live @ Feuertanz Festival 2013)	4:01
6.	"Havoc" (Live @ Feuertanz Festival 2013)	4:39
Total length:		31:10

== Personnel ==
=== Eluveitie ===
- Chrigel Glanzmann – harsh vocals, bard harp, whistles, uilleann pipes, mandola, bodhrán
- Ivo Henzi – rhythm guitar
- Merlin Sutter – drums
- Anna Murphy – hurdy-gurdy, clean vocals
- Kay Brem – bass
- Patrick "Päde" Kistler – tin & low whistles, bagpipes
- Rafael Salzmann – lead guitar
- Nicole Ansperger – fiddle, cello

=== Guests musicians ===
- Alexander Morton – male narration on No. 01, 05, 09 & 16
- Karen Bartke – female narration on No. 06
- Emily Clays – child narration on No. 01, 02 & 14
- Maria Körndorfer – violins
- Christian Krebs – cellos
- Fredy Schnyder – hammered dulcimer on No. 05
- Christine Lauterburg – jodel on No. 04
- Konan Mevel – binou kozh, pybgorn, additional whistles on No. 04
- Fabian Hey – gaulish rebel choir on No. 13
- Michael Müller – gaulish rebel choir on No. 13
- Samuel Stamm – gaulish rebel choir on No. 13
- David Horstmann – gaulish rebel choir on No. 13
- Severin Caluori – gaulish rebel choir on No. 13
- Sileno Püntener – gaulish rebel choir on No. 13
- Fabian Agner – gaulish rebel choir on No. 13
- Marc Betschart – gaulish rebel choir on No. 13
- Farhad Ahmadi – gaulish rebel choir on No. 13
- Raphael Knuser – gaulish rebel choir on No. 13
- Kinderchor des Konservatoriums – children choir on No. 07
- Christoph Bachmann – children's choir conductor on No. 07

== Chart performance ==
For the first time in Eluveitie's twelve-year history their album reached number one in Switzerland. On hearing the news the band commented "That is just unbelievable. We are proud, happy, and most of all thankful to you, our fans. Together with you we've achieved the impossible and put metal where it belongs: at the top!". In addition to this, Origins reached number one on Billboard's Heatseekers Albums chart and broke the German top ten; peaking at number six.

Chart (2014)	Peak; position
Austrian Albums (Ö3 Austria)	22
Belgian Albums (Ultratop Wallonia)	115
Finnish Albums (Suomen virallinen lista)	37
French Albums (SNEP)	52
German Albums (Offizielle Top 100)	6
Swiss Albums (Schweizer Hitparade)	1
UK Independent Albums (OCC)	21
UK Independent Albums Breaker (OCC)	6
UK Rock & Metal Albums (OCC)	13
U.S. Billboard 200	104
U.S. Hard Rock Albums	12
U.S. Heatseekers Albums	1
U.S. Independent Albums	12
U.S. Top Rock Albums	30
