= Ategnatos =

Studio album by Eluveitie
- Released: 5 April 2019
- Studio: Newsound Studios, Pfäffikon, Switzerland
- Genre: Folk metal, melodic death metal, Celtic metal
- Length: 60:20
- Label: Nuclear Blast
- Producer: Eluveitie & Jonas Wolf

Eluveitie studio album chronology
Evocation II: Pantheon (2017)	Ategnatos (2019)	Ànv (2025)

Singles from Ategnatos
- 1. "Rebirth" Released: 27 October 2017; 2. "Ategnatos" Released: 1 February 2019; 3. "Ambiramus" Released: 15 March 2019; 4. "The Slumber" Released: 11 April 2019; 5. "Worship" Released: 25 April 2019

Ategnatos is the eighth studio album by Swiss folk metal band Eluveitie. The album was released on 5 April 2019 through Nuclear Blast. It is their longest studio album to date.

== Reception ==
Professional ratings
Review scores
Source	Rating
Folk N' Metal	10/10
Metal Hammer Germany	5.5/7
New Noise	3.5/5 stars
Rock Hard	8.5/10

The album received positive reviews wherein the writers praised the musical quality and diversity of the band. It was also noted that songs like "Mine is the Fury" were harder and heavier than many previous releases of the band. with Metal Hammer calling it the first "true" Eluveitie album after five years. The reviewer for New Noise concluded, however, that "Ategnatos is a good album, though after Eluveitie’s long history and extensive discography, it’s an offering that doesn’t quite stand out from the rest of their catalog."

== Track listing ==
All lyrics are written by Chrigel Glanzmann, except track 8 by Glanzmann and Jonas Wolf.

No.	Title	Music	Length
1.	"Ategnatos"	Glanzmann; Wolf; Matteo Sisti; Rafael Salzmann	4:54
2.	"Ancus"	Glanzmann	0:12
3.	"Deathwalker"	Wolf; Glanzmann	4:54
4.	"Black Water Dawn"	Wolf; Glanzmann	4:18
5.	"A Cry in the Wilderness"	Wolf; Glanzmann	5:25
6.	"The Raven Hill"	Wolf; Glanzmann	4:12
7.	"The Silvern Glow"	Glanzmann	1:10
8.	"Ambiramus"	Glanzmann; Wolf; Fabienne Erni; Tommy Vetterli	2:53
9.	"Mine Is the Fury"	Glanzmann; Wolf	3:34
10.	"The Slumber"	Wolf; Glanzmann	4:57
11.	"Worship" (featuring Randy Blythe)	Glanzmann; Wolf	5:35
12.	"Trinoxtion"	Glanzmann	1:18
13.	"Threefold Death"	Wolf; Glanzmann; Vetterli	3:31
14.	"Breathe"	Wolf; Glanzmann	5:28
15.	"Rebirth"	Glanzmann; Wolf; Salzmann; Erni	4:58
16.	"Eclipse"	Glanzmann	3:01
Total length:			60:20

Ategnatos – Digipack bonus tracks
No.	Title	Length
17.	"Ategnatos" (Acoustic Version)	3:50
18.	"Ambiramus" (Acoustic Version)	3:09
19.	"Threefold Rebirth" (Acoustic Folk Medley)	2:57
Total length:		70:17

== Personnel ==
=== Eluveitie ===
- Chrigel Glanzmann – vocals, mandola, whistles
- Fabienne Erni – vocals, Celtic harp
- Matteo Sisti – bagpipes, Uilleann pipes, whistles, bodhrán
- Michalina Malisz – hurdy-gurdy
- Nicole Ansperger – fiddles
- Kay Brem – bass
- Jonas Wolf – Lead guitar, resonator guitar
- Rafael Salzmann – lead guitar
- Alain Ackermann – drums, percussion

=== Guests ===
- Coen Strouken - viola
- Rebecca Thies - violin
- Sandrine Kindler-Chanson - violin
- Anne Jeger - cello
- Alexander Morton - narration (track 1, 3, and 14)
- Randy Blythe - additional vocals/narration (track 11)
- Meri Tadić - narration (track 12)

== Charts ==
Chart (2019)	Peak position
Austrian Albums (Ö3 Austria)	12
Belgian Albums (Ultratop Flanders)	159
French Albums (SNEP)	73
German Albums (Offizielle Top 100)	11
Scottish Albums (OCC)	85
Spanish Albums (PROMUSICAE)	56
Swiss Albums (Schweizer Hitparade)	3
