= Helvetios =

Studio album by Eluveitie
- Released: 10 February 2012
- Recorded: 2011
- Studios: New Sound Studio, Pfäffikon
- Genres: Folk metal, melodic death metal, Celtic metal
- Length: 59:12
- Label: Nuclear Blast
- Producers: Tommy Vetterli, Eluveitie

Eluveitie studio album chronology
| Everything Remains (As It Never Was) (2010) | Helvetios (2012) | Origins (2014) |

Singles from Helvetios
- 1. "Meet the Enemy" Released: 17 January 2012

Helvetios is the fifth studio album by Swiss folk metal band Eluveitie. The album was released 10 February 2012 through Nuclear Blast. The CD was recorded at New Sound Studio in Pfäffikon, a municipality in the canton of Schwyz in Switzerland, with producer Tommy Vetterli. It was the last album to include violinist Meri Tadić and guitarist Simeon Koch.

== Concept ==
Being the band's first concept album, it focuses on the Gallic Wars from a perspective of the ancient Helvetians.

== Style ==
The album features melodic death metal combined with Celtic folk music instruments like fiddle, hurdy-gurdy, flutes, whistles, bagpipes, mandola, bodhran, and hammered dulcimer. Band member Anna Murphy has been more involved in songwriting and has been given more vocal parts than on previous releases.

== Reception ==
Professional ratings
Review scores
| Source | Rating |
|---|---|
| AllMusic | 3.5/5 stars |
| Der Metal Krieger | 9/10 stars |
| Metal Hammer (Germany) | 6/7 |
| Sonic Seducer | very favourable |
| Stormbringer | 4.5/5 stars |
| Lambgoat | 8/10 stars |
| Peek from the Pit | 10/10 stars |

Helvetios received favourable professional reviews in Germany with the Sonic Seducer magazine calling the album "pure efficiency (pure Effizienz)." The German edition of Metal Hammer lauded the tracks "Meet The Enemy", "Neverland" and "The Siege" for their aggressive Metal style and concluded that Eluveitie's musical virtues were being continued on this album. A review by the Austrian Stormbringer compared the track "The Siege" to Sepultura's style and called the album a "piece of art."

== Chart performance ==
The album reached the top ten on the albums chart in Switzerland and the Top Heatseekers chart in the United States.

| Chart | Peak position |
|---|---|
| Swiss Music Charts | 4 |
| Canadian Albums Chart | 73 |
| Finland's Official List | 47 |
| French SNEP | 81 |
| German Media Control Charts | 27 |
| US Billboard 200 | 143 |
| US Heatseeker Albums | 3 |

== Track listing ==
All lyrics are written by Chrigel Glanzmann, except "Home" co-written by Anna Murphy.

| No. | Title | Music | Length |
|---|---|---|---|
| 1. | "Prologue" | Glanzmann | 1:24 |
| 2. | "Helvetios" | Glanzmann; Ivo Henzi; Murphy | 4:00 |
| 3. | "Luxtos" | Glanzmann; Henzi; Meri Tadić | 3:56 |
| 4. | "Home" | Glanzmann | 5:16 |
| 5. | "Santonian Shores" | Glanzmann; Henzi; Murphy | 3:58 |
| 6. | "Scorched Earth" | Glanzmann | 4:18 |
| 7. | "Meet the Enemy" | Glanzmann; Henzi | 3:46 |
| 8. | "Neverland" | Glanzmann; Henzi; Murphy; Tadić | 3:42 |
| 9. | "A Rose for Epona" | Glanzmann; Henzi; Murphy | 4:26 |
| 10. | "Havoc" | Glanzmann; Henzi; Murphy | 4:05 |
| 11. | "The Uprising" | Glanzmann; Henzi | 3:41 |
| 12. | "Hope" | Glanzmann | 2:27 |
| 13. | "The Siege" | Glanzmann; Henzi; Murphy | 2:44 |
| 14. | "Alesia" | Glanzmann; Henzi; Murphy | 3:58 |
| 15. | "Tullianum" | Glanzmann | 0:24 |
| 16. | "Uxellodunon" | Henzi; Murphy; Tadić | 3:51 |
| 17. | "Epilogue" | Glanzmann | 3:16 |
| Total length: | | | 59:12 |

Limited edition bonus track
| No. | Title | Music | Length |
|---|---|---|---|
| 18. | "A Rose for Epona" (acoustic version) | Glanzmann; Henzi; Murphy | 3:49 |
| Total length: | | | 63:01 |

Limited Edition Bonus DVD
| No. | Title | Length |
|---|---|---|
| 1. | "A Rose for Epona" (Video Clip) |
| 2. | "Havoc" (Video Clip) |
| 3. | "A Rose for Epona" (Making Of) |
| 4. | "Havoc" (Making Of) |
| 5. | "A Closer Look at the Lyrics" (...In Conversation with a Scientist) |
| 6. | "Live at Feuertanz Festival 2010" (4 Songs Live) |
| Total length: | | 93:00 |

== Personnel ==
=== Eluveitie ===
- Chrigel Glanzmann – harsh vocals, harp, tin & low whistle, uilleann pipes, mandola, bodhrán
- Anna Murphy – clean vocals, harsh vocals in "The Siege" and "Meet the Enemy", hurdy-gurdy
- Kay Brem – bass guitar, Caesar's voice in "Havoc"
- Ivo Henzi – rhythm guitar
- Simeon Koch – lead guitar, mandola
- Patrick "Päde" Kistler – bagpipes, whistles
- Merlin Sutter – drums
- Meri Tadić – fiddles

=== Guests ===
- Alexander Morton – voice in the narrations of tracks 1, 11 & 17
- Nina Macchi – recorder in track 12
- Christoph Pelgen – gwerz vocals in track 6
- Fredy Schnyder – hammered dulcimer in tracks 4 & 7
- Sarah Wauquiez – zugerörgeli (helvetic accordion) in track 3
