= Ànv =

Studio album by Eluveitie
- Released: 25 April 2025
- Recorded: 2022–2024
- Genre: Folk metal, melodic death metal, Celtic metal
- Label: Nuclear Blast

Eluveitie studio album chronology
Ategnatos (2019)	Ànv (2025)

Singles from Ànv
- 1. "Aidus" Released: 2 June 2022; 2. "Exile of the Gods" Released: 14 October 2022; 3. "Premonition" Released: 5 December 2024; 4. "The Prodigal Ones" Released: 21 January 2025; 5. "Awen" Released: 7 March 2025; 6. "Taranoías" Released: 25 April 2025

Ànv is the ninth studio album by Swiss folk metal band Eluveitie. The album was announced on 21 January 2025 and was released on 25 April 2025 through Nuclear Blast Records. It is Eluveitie's first studio album to feature hurdy-gurdy player and violinist Lea-Sophie Fischer, following the departures of Annie Riediger and Nicole Ansperger from the band in 2024.

== Background ==
In 2022, Eluveitie released two standalone singles "Aidus" and "Exile of the Gods". These tracks have been omitted from the standard track listing of Ànv, but will be included as bonus tracks on the deluxe version of the album, along with a metal version of "Epona", originally from 2017's Evocation II: Pantheon.

Upon releasing "The Prodigal Ones" and announcing Ànv, Eluveitie frontman Chrigel Glanzmann commented, "Hard to express how excited we are to share this one with you all! Musically combining the heavy pounding Elu classics like 'Luxtos', 'Inis Mona' or even 'King' with some new, maybe unexpected ideas, we feel that this song most of all comes like a punch in the face and we hope you'll enjoy it as much as we do! Lyrically it actually opens the big theme of Ànv - these ancient words, several thousands of years old, our upcoming album is based on...".

== Promotion ==
On 3 December 2024, Eluveitie announced their new single "Premonition" via their social media profiles. The song was released two days later, alongside a music video.

Ànv was officially announced on 21 January 2025, coinciding with the release of the album's second single "The Prodigal Ones".

The band embarked on their "Ànv Rising - Europe Part I" tour in January and February 2025 with support acts Infected Rain and Ad Infinitum, and will support Arch Enemy on their European Blood Dynasty 2025 Tour in October and November 2025, alongside Amorphis and Gatecreeper.

== Track listing ==
No.	Title	Length
1.	"Emerge"	1:11
2.	"Taranoías"	3:26
3.	"The Prodigal Ones"	3:44
4.	"Ànv"	2:33
5.	"Premonition"	5:13
6.	"Awen"	4:22
7.	"Anamcara"	1:37
8.	"The Harvest"	3:38
9.	"Memories of Innocence"	2:25
10.	"All Is One"	3:42
11.	"Aeon of the Crescent Moon"	4:22
12.	"The Prophecy"	5:11
Total length:		41:13

Bonus tracks
No.	Title	Length
13.	"Aidus"	5:32
14.	"Exile of the Gods"	4:08
15.	"Epona (Metal Version)"	3:57

== Personnel ==
=== Eluveitie ===
- Chrigel Glanzmann – lead vocals, acoustic guitars, mandolin, Uilleann pipes, bodhrán, whistles, harp
- Fabienne Erni – lead vocals, mandola, Celtic harp
- Rafael Salzmann – lead guitars
- Jonas Wolf – rhythm guitars
- Lea-Sophie Fischer – violin, hurdy-gurdy
- Matteo Sisti – bagpipes, whistles, acoustic guitars, mandolin, Uilleann pipes, bodhrán, hurdy-gurdy
- Kay Brem – bass guitars
- Alain Ackermann – drums, percussion

=== Additional personnel ===
- Jens Bogren – production, engineering, mixing, mastering
- Jonas Wolf – co-production
- Tommy Vetterli – co-production
- Michalina Malisz – hurdy-gurdy on tracks 1–6, 8–10
- Annie Riediger – hurdy-gurdy on tracks 11 and 12
- Adrienne Cowan – additional vocals on track 12
- Jack Kosto – recording of additional vocals on track 12
- Mirjam Skal – orchestration, soundscapes and choir arrangements & recordings
- Noemi von Felten - performed and recorded the harp on the album
- Dannii Young – spoken words on track 7
- Mirko Witzki – music video direction on "Premonition"

== Charts ==
Chart performance for Ànv
Chart (2025)	Peak position
Austrian Albums (Ö3 Austria)	6
Belgian Albums (Ultratop Flanders)	88
German Albums (Offizielle Top 100)	16
Swiss Albums (Schweizer Hitparade)	5
UK Album Downloads (OCC)	48
