= Everything Remains (As It Never Was) =

Studio album by Eluveitie
- Released: 19 February 2010
- Recorded: September–October 2009
- Studio: Newsound studios, Pfäffikon, Switzerland
- Genre: Folk metal, melodic death metal, Celtic metal
- Length: 47:03
- Label: Nuclear Blast
- Producer: Colin Richardson

Eluveitie studio album chronology
Evocation I: The Arcane Dominion (2009)	Everything Remains (As It Never Was) (2010)	Helvetios (2012)

Singles from Everything Remains (As It Never Was)
- 1. "Thousandfold" Released: 24 January 2010

Professional ratings
Review scores
Source	Rating
AllMusic	4/5 stars
PopMatters	6/10 stars
Sputnikmusic	3/5

Everything Remains (As It Never Was) is the fourth studio album by Swiss folk metal band Eluveitie. The album was produced by Colin Richardson, and released on 19 February 2010 through Nuclear Blast.

The album spawned one single, "Thousandfold", which has gained over 14,600,000 views on YouTube.

== Sound ==
Unlike Eluveitie's previous release Evocation I: The Arcane Dominion which was primarily a folk rock/acoustic folk album, Everything Remains returns to the band's roots and is a straight folk metal album.

== Reception ==
Everything Remains generally received highly positive reviews. Pascal Stieler, writing for Metal1.info wrote that Everything Remains was "in all matters outstanding, varied album that simply has no weaknesses" and gave the album 9/10. Metal.de also gave the album 9/10.

The fanbase's reaction was generally positive, with songs like Thousandfold being played frequently on tour.

== Track listing ==
All lyrics are written by Chrigel Glanzmann.

No.	Title	Music	Length
1.	"Otherworld"	Glanzmann	1:57
2.	"Everything Remains as It Never Was"	Glanzmann	4:25
3.	"Thousandfold"	Glanzmann; Ivo Henzi	3:20
4.	"Nil"	Glanzmann	3:43
5.	"The Essence of Ashes"	Glanzmann; Henzi	3:59
6.	"Isara"	Glanzmann	2:44
7.	"Kingdom Come Undone"	Glanzmann	3:22
8.	"Quoth the Raven"	Glanzmann; Henzi; Anna Murphy; Meri Tadić	4:42
9.	"(Do)minion"	Glanzmann	5:07
10.	"Setlon"	Glanzmann	2:36
11.	"Sempiternal Embers"	Glanzmann	4:52
12.	"Lugdūnon"	Glanzmann	4:01
13.	"The Liminal Passage"	Glanzmann	2:15
Total length:			47:03

Limited Edition bonus tracks
No.	Title	Length
14.	"Otherworld Set"	2:34
15.	"The Liminal Passage Set"	2:49

DVD
No.	Title	Length
1.	"Video clip of "Thousandfold""
2.	"Making of the video clip of "Thousandfold""
3.	"A closer look at the lyrics"
4.	"Making of the album"
5.	"Recording of "Thousandfold""
6.	"Recording of "(Do)minion""
7.	"Recording of "Quoth the Raven""

== Credits ==
- Chrigel Glanzmann - vocals, acoustic guitars, mandolin, uilleann pipes, bodhràn, tin and low whistles, gaita
- Anna Murphy – hurdy gurdy, flute, vocals
- Meri Tadić – violin, vocals
- Päde Kistler – bagpipes, tin and low whistles
- Kay Brem – bass
- Merlin Sutter – drums
- Sime Koch – guitars
- Ivo Henzi – guitars
- Torbjörn "Thebon" Schei - additional vocals on "(Do)minion"
- Brendan Wade - uilleann pipes on "Otherworld", "Setlon" and "The Liminal Passage"
- Dannii Young - spoken voice on "Otherworld" and "The Liminal Passage"
- Arranged by Eluveitie
- Drums, guitars (electric and acoustic), bass and vocals were recorded at Newsound Studio, Pfäffikon SZ, Switzerland. These recordings were engineered by Tommy Vetterli.
- Fiddle and hurdy gurdy were recorded at Devil's Studios, Vaduz/Liechtenstein. These recordings were engineered by Ivo Henzi and Olli Frank-Zambelli. Fiddle was engineered by Freddy Schnyder.
- Bagpipes, whistles, uilleann pipes, mandola, mandolin and bodhrán were recorded at C Studio, Switzerland. These recordings were engineered by Chrigel Glanzmann. Microphones by Ballhorn Studios, Winterhur, Switzerland.
- Mixed by Colin Richardson and Martin "Ginge" Ford for Real Productions and Management at Not-In-Pill Studios, Newport, Wales
- Mastered by John Davis
- Produced by Eluveitie and Tommy Vetterli.

== Chart performance ==
Chart (2010)	Peak; position
German Albums (Offizielle Top 100)	19
Swiss Albums (Schweizer Hitparade)	8
French Albums (SNEP)	110
Austrian Albums (Ö3 Austria)	22
Finnish Albums (Suomen virallinen lista)	31
Greek Albums (IFPI)	23
US Heatseekers Albums (Billboard)	23
