= The Early Years (Eluveitie album) =

Compilation album by Eluveitie
- Released: 17 August 2012
- Recorded: 2003–2012
- Genre: Folk metal, melodic death metal, Celtic metal, Pagan metal
- Length: 73:37
- Label: Nuclear Blast
- Producer: Tommy Vetterli

Eluveitie compilation album chronology
Slania/Evocation I – The Arcane Metal Hammer Edition (2009)	The Early Years (2012)	Best Of (2013)

The Early Years is the second compilation album by Swiss folk metal band Eluveitie. It was released to mark the 10th anniversary of the band and the compilation contains both re-recorded songs from their EP and demo Vên and also all the tracks from their first studio album Spirit.

== Track listing ==
No.	Title	Length
1.	"Verja Urit An Bitus" (Re-recorded from Vên)	2:17
2.	"Uis Elveti" (Re-recorded from Vên)	4:00
3.	"Ôrô" (Re-recorded from Vên)	1:27
4.	"Lament" (Re-recorded from Vên)	4:06
5.	"Druid" (Re-recorded from Vên)	6:06
6.	"Jêzaïg" (Re-recorded from Vên)	4:54
7.	"Spirit" (From Spirit)	2:32
8.	"Uis Elveti" (From Spirit)	4:24
9.	"Your Gaulish War" (From Spirit)	5:11
10.	"Of Fire, Wind & Wisdom" (From Spirit)	3:05
11.	"Aidû" (From Spirit)	3:10
12.	"The Song of Life" (From Spirit)	3:58
13.	"Tegernakô" (From Spirit)	6:42
14.	"Siraxta" (From Spirit)	5:39
15.	"The Dance of Victory" (From Spirit)	5:23
16.	"The Endless Knot" (From Spirit)	6:59
17.	"AnDro" (From Spirit)	3:42

== Chart performance ==
Chart (2012)	Peak; position
German Albums (Offizielle Top 100)	67
Swiss Albums (Schweizer Hitparade)	18
