= Slania =

Studio album by Eluveitie
- Released: 15 February 2008
- Studios: Fascination Street Studios (Örebro, Sweden)
- Genres: Folk metal, melodic death metal, Celtic metal
- Length: 48:42
- Label: Nuclear Blast
- Producer: Jens Bogren

Eluveitie studio album chronology
Spirit (2006)	Slania (2008)	Evocation I: The Arcane Dominion (2009)

Alternative cover
- 10th anniversary edition cover

Professional ratings
Review scores
Source	Rating
Allmusic	3.5/5 stars
Blabbermouth.net	8/10 stars
About.com	4/5 stars
Lords of Metal	9.5/10 stars

Slania is the second studio album by Swiss folk metal band Eluveitie. It is the first one to include Anna Murphy as part of the band. It was released on 15 February 2008 through Nuclear Blast.

== Reception ==
Slania has received very positive reviews from both critics and the fanbase.

In a highly positive review, Vera of Lords Of Metal gave the album 94/100 and said that "with "Slania" Eluveitie will promote [themselves] from the second tier to the top of the pagan metal scene!"

Chad Bowar of AllMusic gave the album 4/5 and said "A lot of hooks, plenty of punch, and the unique instruments make Slania an excellent folk metal CD"

Scott Alisogu of Blabbermouth.net gave the album 8/10 and said "As a matter of fact, there is nothing here that warrants any kind of negative criticism"

The album brought Eluveitie in to the mainstream of Folk Metal and they remain to this day as one of the most popular folk metal bands, largely due to the help of the very popular song "Inis Mona" which has gone viral on YouTube and is played at all of their concerts. The song uses the musical air of the Breton traditional song Tri Martolod.

== Track listing ==
All tracks are written by Chrigel Glanzmann, except "Primordial Breath" co-written by Sevan Kirder and "Slanias Song" co-written by David Stifter.

No.	Title	Length
1.	"Samon"	1:49
2.	"Primordial Breath"	4:19
3.	"Inis Mona"	4:09
4.	"Gray Sublime Archon"	4:21
5.	"Anagantios"	3:25
6.	"Bloodstained Ground"	3:20
7.	"The Somber Lay"	4:00
8.	"Slanias Song"	5:40
9.	"Giamonios"	1:23
10.	"Tarvos"	4:39
11.	"Calling the Rain"	5:06
12.	"Elembivos"	6:31
Total length:		48:42

Japanese edition bonus track
No.	Title	Length
13.	"Samon" (acoustic version)	1:26
Total length:		50:08

Slania: 10 Years - 10th anniversary edition bonus tracks
No.	Title	Length
13.	"Samon" (acoustic version)	1:26
14.	"Interview with Slania"	6:00
15.	"Samon" (demo)	1:46
16.	"Primordial Breath" (demo)	4:39
17.	"Inis Mona" (demo)	4:30
18.	"Bloodstained Ground" (demo)	3:13
19.	"Tarvos" (demo)	5:00
Total length:		74:56

== Credits ==
=== Eluveitie ===
- Chrigel Glanzmann - vocals (harsh), acoustic guitar, uilleann pipes, mandolin, bodhrán, tin and low whistles
- Anna Murphy – hurdy-gurdy, vocals (clean)
- Simeon Koch – lead guitar, backing vocals
- Ivo Henzi – rhythm guitar
- Rafi Kirder – bass
- Merlin Sutter – drums
- Meri Tadic – violin, backing vocals
- Sevan Kirder – Irish flute, tin whistles, bagpipes

=== Guest musicians ===
- Simon Solomon - guitar on track 12
- Max Rutschmann - children choir on track 8
- Leo Rutschmann - children choir on track 8
- Marlo Boesiger - children choir on track 8
- Jil Boesiger - children choir on track 8
- Ariana Schürmann - children choir on track 8
- Tatjana Jud - children choir on track 8

== Chart performance ==
Chart	Peak; position
German Albums (Offizielle Top 100)	72
Swiss Albums (Schweizer Hitparade)	35
