= Chrigel Glanzmann =

Swiss musician

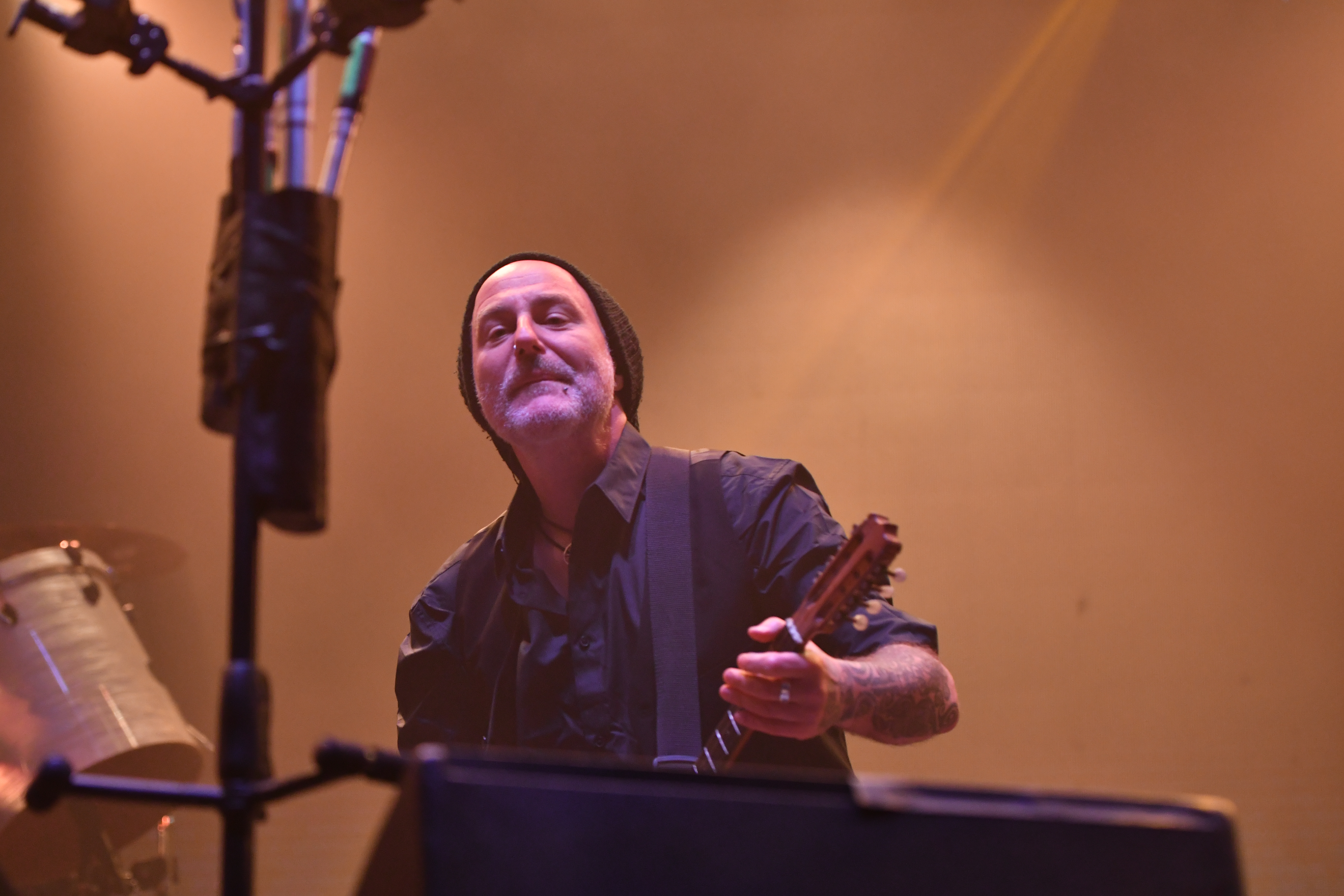
- Glanzmann, 2023

Background information
- Born: Christian Oliver Ivan Glanzmann; 26 May 1975 (age 50); Basel, Basel-Stadt, Switzerland
- Origin: Winterthur, Zürich, Switzerland
- Genres: Folk metal; melodic death metal; Celtic metal
- Occupations: Musician; singer; songwriter; record producer
- Instruments: Vocals; mandola; whistles; pipes; gaita; acoustic guitar; bodhrán; harp; sitar
- Years active: 2000–present
- Labels: Nuclear Blast; Fear Dark
- Member of: Eluveitie
- Website: Eluveitie's website Branâ Keternâ's website

Christian Oliver Ivan Glanzmann (born 26 May 1975) is a Swiss musician, singer, songwriter and record producer, best known as the male lead vocalist of Swiss folk metal band Eluveitie. He also plays mandola, whistles, and bagpipes in Branâ Keternâ.

== Early life ==
Glanzmann was born on 26 May 1975 in Basel, Switzerland.

== Equipment ==
- Throat/Shure SM58
- Mandola (Koch)
- Tin & low whistles (Karavev & Burkes)
- Electric bagpipes (Redpipes)
- Gaita
- Acoustic guitar
- Bodhrán
- Audix Microphones

== Discography ==
=== With Eluveitie ===
==== Studio albums ====
- Spirit (2006)
- Slania (2008)
- Evocation I: The Arcane Dominion (2009)
- Everything Remains (As It Never Was) (2010)
- Helvetios (2012)
- Origins (2014)
- Evocation II: Pantheon (2017)
- Ategnatos (2019)
- Ànv (2025)

=== With Branâ Keternâ ===
- vJod

=== With Môr Cylch ===
- Craic

=== Guest appearances ===
- Folkearth – I
- Roy – Anthems
- Amorphis – Under the Red Cloud
- Amorphis – Queen of Time
- Illumishade – Tales of Time
- Ad Infinitum – "Legends" from the album Chapter III: Downfall (2023)
