= Evocation II: Pantheon =

Studio album by Eluveitie
- Released: 18 August 2017
- Recorded: March–April 2017
- Studio: New Sound Studio in Freienbach, Switzerland Hurdy-gurdy in Recpublica Studios in Lubrza, Poland
- Genre: Acoustic rock, folk rock, Celtic rock
- Length: 53:06
- Language: Gaulish
- Label: Nuclear Blast
- Producer: Chrigel Glanzmann & Eluveitie with Tommy Vetterli

Eluveitie studio album chronology
Origins (2014)	Evocation II: Pantheon (2017)	Ategnatos (2019)

Singles from Evocation II: Pantheon
- 1. "Epona" Released: 4 July 2017; 2. "Lvgvs" Released: 28 July 2017

Professional ratings
Review scores
Source	Rating
Metal Injection	6.5/10 stars
Bravewords.com	7.5/10 stars

Evocation II: Pantheon is the seventh studio album by Swiss folk metal band Eluveitie. The album was released on 18 August 2017 on the Nuclear Blast record label. It was the first album to include Matteo Sisti, Michalina Malisz, Alain Ackermann, Jonas Wolf and Fabienne Erni as band members.

== Track listing ==
All lyrics are written by Chrigel Glanzmann.

No.	Title	Music	Length
1.	"Dvreððv"	Glanzmann	1:23
2.	"Epona"	Glanzmann; Rafael Salzmann; Michalina Malisz	3:47
3.	"Svcellos II (Seqvel)"	Glanzmann; Eoin Duignan	1:28
4.	"Nantosvelta"	Glanzmann; Salzmann; Nicole Ansperger	2:45
5.	"Tovtatis"	Glanzmann	1:05
6.	"Lvgvs" ("Son ar chistr")	Glanzmann; Fabienne Erni	4:16
7.	"Grannos"	Glanzmann; Salzmann; Ansperger; Jonas Wolf; Margit Bazilewski	3:23
8.	"Cernvnnos"	Glanzmann; Malisz; Erni; Ansperger; Wolf; Matteo Sisti	2:54
9.	"Catvrix"	Glanzmann; Erni; Alain Ackermann	2:44
10.	"Artio"	Glanzmann; Erni	5:11
11.	"Aventia"	Glanzmann; Malisz; Wolf	3:30
12.	"Ogmios" ("Tri Martolod")	trad.	3:13
13.	"Esvs" ("Pelot d'Hennebont")	Glanzmann; Salzmann; Erni; Wolf	3:48
14.	"Antvmnos" ("Scarborough Fair")	trad.; Glanzmann	3:43
15.	"Tarvos II (Seqvel)"	Glanzmann; Salzmann; Wolf; Sisti	2:43
16.	"Belenos"	Glanzmann; Wolf; Sisti	3:09
17.	"Taranis"	Glanzmann; Ackermann	2:41
18.	"Nemeton"	Glanzmann	1:23
Total length:			53:06

== Personnel ==
=== Eluveitie ===
- Chrigel Glanzmann – vocals, mandola, whistles
- Fabienne Erni – vocals, celtic harp
- Matteo Sisti – bagpipes, uilleann pipes, whistles, bodhrán
- Michalina Malisz – hurdy-gurdy
- Nicole Ansperger – fiddles, vocals on track 4
- Kay Brem – bass guitar
- Jonas Wolf – acoustic guitars, resonator guitars
- Rafael Salzmann – acoustic guitars
- Alain Ackermann – drums, percussion

=== Guests musicians ===
- Oliver s. Tyr – nyckelharpa, irish bouzouki on track 2 & 8
- Brendan Wade – uilleann pipes on track 7 & 12
- Netta Skog – accordion on track 6

Choirs in track 1 & 9 by Chrigel Glanzmann, Jonas Wolf, Kay Brem & Fabienne Erni

Linguistic consulting by Edward Hatfield

== Charts ==
Chart (2017)	Peak position
Austrian Albums (Ö3 Austria)	18
French Albums (SNEP)	64
Belgian Albums (Ultratop Flanders)	72
Belgian Albums (Ultratop Wallonia)	42
German Albums (Offizielle Top 100)	11
Swiss Albums (Schweizer Hitparade)	2
US Heatseekers Albums (Billboard)	6
US Independent Albums (Billboard)	25
