= Eluveitie =

Swiss folk metal band

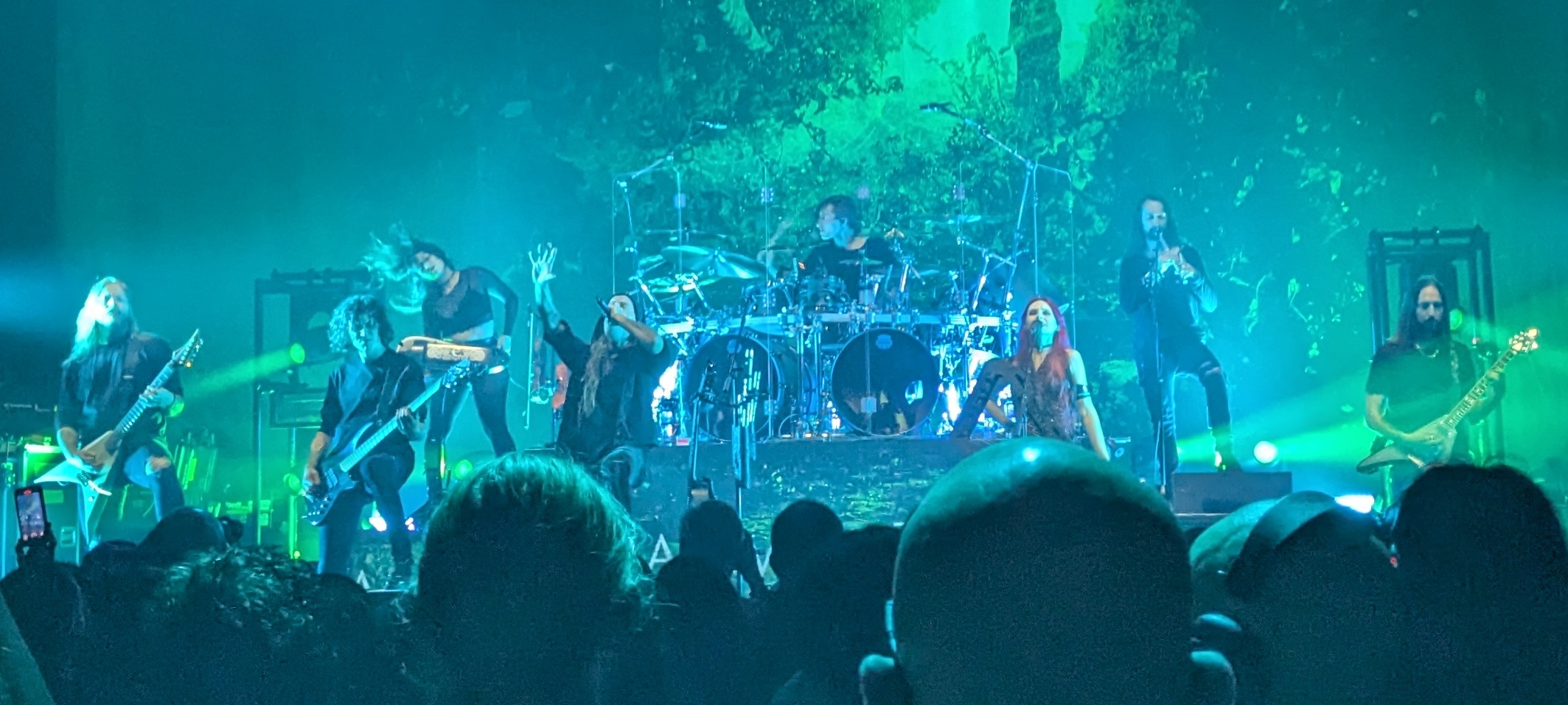
- Eluveitie performing in 2025

Background information
- Origin: Winterthur, Zürich, Switzerland
- Genres: Folk metal; melodic death metal; Celtic metal
- Years active: 2002–present
- Labels: Nuclear Blast; Fear Dark
- Members: Chrigel Glanzmann; Kay Brem; Rafael Salzmann; Jonas Wolf; Alain Ackermann; Fabienne Erni; Lea-Sophie Fischer
- Past members: See members
- Website: www.eluveitie.ch

Eluveitie (/ɛlˈveɪti/ el-VAY-tee; German: [ɛlˈfaɪ̯tiː]) is a Swiss folk metal band from Winterthur, Zürich, founded in 2002 by Chrigel Glanzmann. The project's first demo, Vên, was released in 2003. Vên was a studio project of Glanzmann's, but its success led to the recruitment of a full band, and the re-release of Vên as an EP in 2004. The band then released a full-length album, Spirit, in June 2006. In November 2007, Eluveitie was signed by Nuclear Blast. The group rose to fame following the release of their first major-label album, Slania, in February 2008. The album peaked at number 35 in the Swiss charts and number 72 in the German charts.

The band's style incorporates characteristics of melodic death metal combined with the melodies of traditional Celtic music. They use traditional European instruments, including the hurdy-gurdy and bagpipes, amidst guitars and both clean and harsh vocals. Their lyrics include references to Celtic mythology, particularly of Celtic Gaul. The lyrics are often in a reconstructed form of the extinct ancient language Gaulish. The name of the band comes from graffiti on a vessel from Mantua (c. 300 BC). The inscription in Etruscan letters reads eluveitie, which has been interpreted as the Etruscan form of the Celtic *(h)elvetios (“the Helvetian”), presumably referring to a man of Helvetian descent living in Mantua.

== History ==
=== Formation, early releases and Spirit (2002–2007) ===
After failing numerous attempts to form an actual band, Christian "Chrigel" Glanzmann created Eluveitie in the winter of 2002 as a studio project featuring various musicians on each track. The musicians had no obligations to the group but to record their parts in the studio. The name of the band comes from graffiti found in Mantua around 300 B.C.E. In Etruscan letters, the inscription read "eluveitie", interpreted in the Etruscan language as "elvetios" ("The Swiss"). The inscription was probably a reference to the Helvetii people who lived in Mantua.

October the following year saw the publication of the MCD Vên (Helvetian Gaulish for "wild joy"). After Chrigel decided to make Eluveitie a real band instead of a studio project, he assembled nine other musicians, making it a full ten-piece band.

Shortly afterwards, the group performed its first shows, one including the Swiss metal festival Elements of Rock, and Eluveitie signed a contract with the Dutch record label Fear Dark, which released a re-recorded Vên in 2004. Other live performances were played, such as on some events of "Fear Dark Festivals", and even as support for the established international pagan–folk metal acts such as Korpiklaani and Cruachan. (Chrigel sent the first MCD to Keith from Cruachan at this time for his opinion.) At this point, the band became full-time, and 6 of the 10 members left for various reasons, leaving Chrigel Glanzmann, Sevan Kirder, Meri Tadić and Dide Marfurt to carry on with new members. They recruited six others, including Sevan Kirder's brother Rafi to play bass.

A limited edition tribute album to the German–Icelandic band Falkenbach was published in 2006 to celebrate their 15th anniversary. The album included Eluveitie's cover song "Vanadis". In the second quarter of 2006, the album entitled Spirit was published on Fear Dark. Although the official release date was 1 June 2006, it was made available on their first official 'tour' in a series of 'Fear Dark Festivals' in May 2006, playing alongside label mates Morphia (HOL) & Royal Anguish (USA), as well as Taketh (SWE). In 2006, After the release of the Spirit album, there was another change in the band's line-up. Sarah Wauquiez was replaced by Anna Murphy to play hurdy-gurdy and Linda Suter was removed, trimming the band down to eight members.

=== Slania, Evocation I and Everything Remains (2007–2012) ===
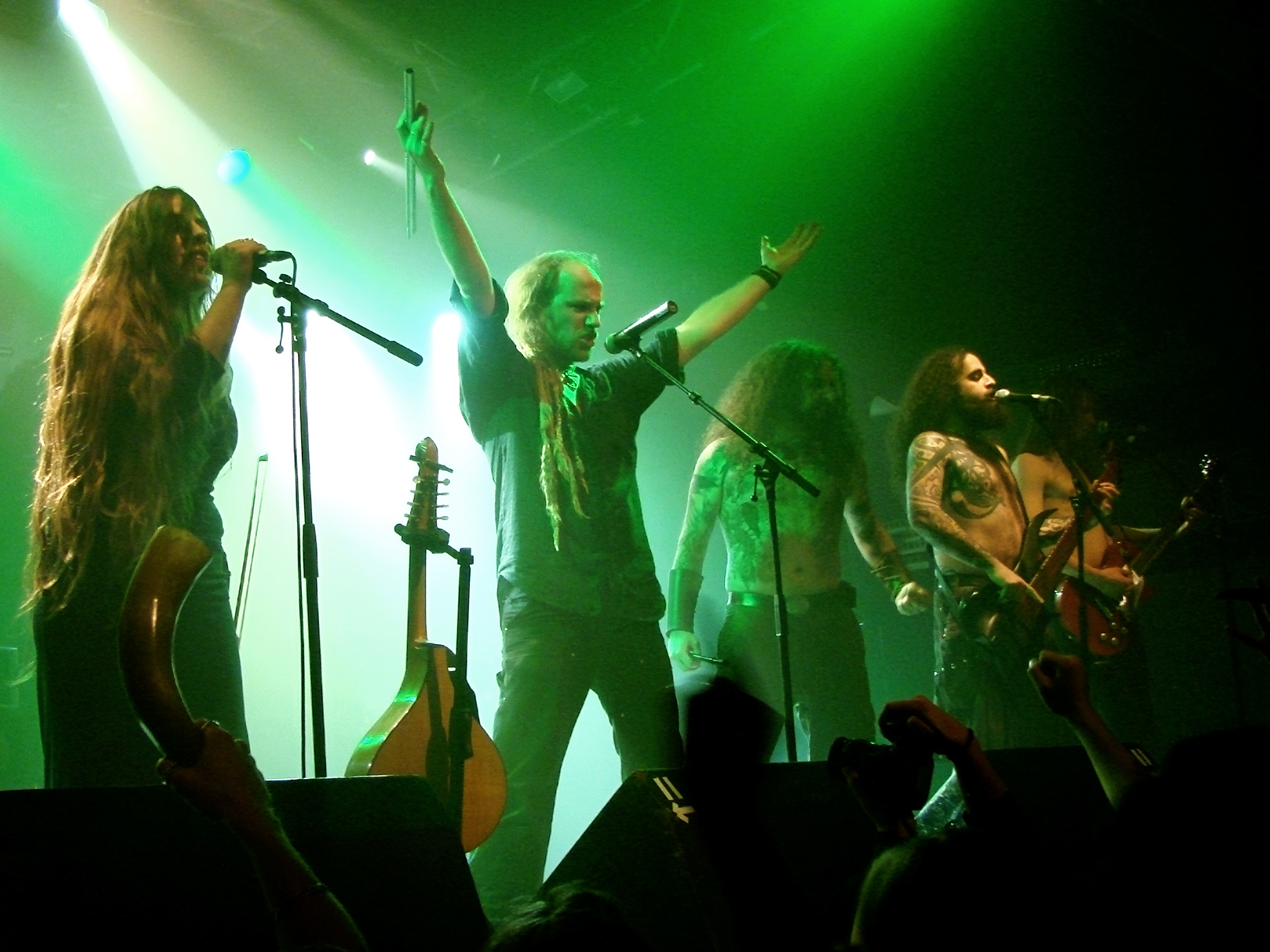
Eluveitie at Cernunnos Fest in 2007

In November 2007, Eluveitie signed a contract with label Nuclear Blast. The new studio album Slania (a girl's name that Chrigel saw on a 2500-year-old tombstone) was released on 15 February 2008. On 4 June 2008, brothers Rafi and Sevan Kirder (bassist and bagpipe player, respectively) announced on their MySpace pages that they would leave Eluveitie following their concert at the Metal Camp Open Air in Slovenia on 8 July 2008.

Eluveitie's next project, Evocation, was announced in 2008. The first part of the album, Evocation I: The Arcane Dominion, was released in April 2009. The band released an official special edition of this new album as Slania/Evocation I – The Arcane Metal Hammer Edition on the May Edition from the Metal Hammer, the magazine was released on 15 April 2009 with eight songs from Evocation I: The Arcane Dominion and five from Slania.

Eluveitie announced via their website on 17 September 2009 that they were working on a new album titled Everything Remains (As It Never Was). The entire album was made available for "full prelistening" through the band's MySpace page on 12 February, to remain available until the album's European release. The album was released on 19 February 2010. Eluveitie toured Europe and North America extensively in 2010. In August 2010, they were awarded the Metal Hammer "Up and Coming 2010" title at the Wacken Open Air.

=== Helvetios and Origins (2012–2015) ===
Eluveitie released Helvetios, another metal album, in 2012, which received very favorable reviews. In an interview with Metal Blast magazine, Chrigel Glanzmann revealed that he had already started writing new material for Evocation II, the follow-up to their 2009 acoustic album, as well as some new metal songs.

During their tour in South America, Anna Murphy, the hurdy-gurdy player and clean vocalist, was reported to be sick on 26 January 2013, and had to take a flight to Switzerland on short notice. Despite this, however, the band continued their tour without her.

On 29 August 2013, it was revealed that Eluveitie had been working on a new album, and that their Helvetios World Tour will be the last of their time playing live (apart from their Eluveitie & Friends Festival) before fully working on the new album. On the 11th of December, it was revealed that Nicole Ansperger will be the successor of longtime member Meri Tadić on the violin.

In March 2014, Eluveitie won the Swiss Music Awards' Best Live Act National award. In April the same year, the band announced a headlining European tour, with support acts Arkona and Skálmöld. On 14 May, the band announced a new album scheduled for release on 1 August 2014, titled Origins. Original artwork created by Chrigel Glanzmann was released as well, along with the theme of the album, which revolves mainly around Gaulish mythology.

In early June, the band announced on their Facebook page that they will be releasing their lead single for Origins, titled "King", on 13, the same month. Eluveitie released the official music video for the song on 3 July. In November, in the middle of a European headliner tour, Patrick "Päde" Kistler was replaced by Matteo Sisti. After a week of silence he released a statement on his official Facebook profile explaining his point of view about the leave.

=== Line-up changes and Evocation II (2015–2017) ===
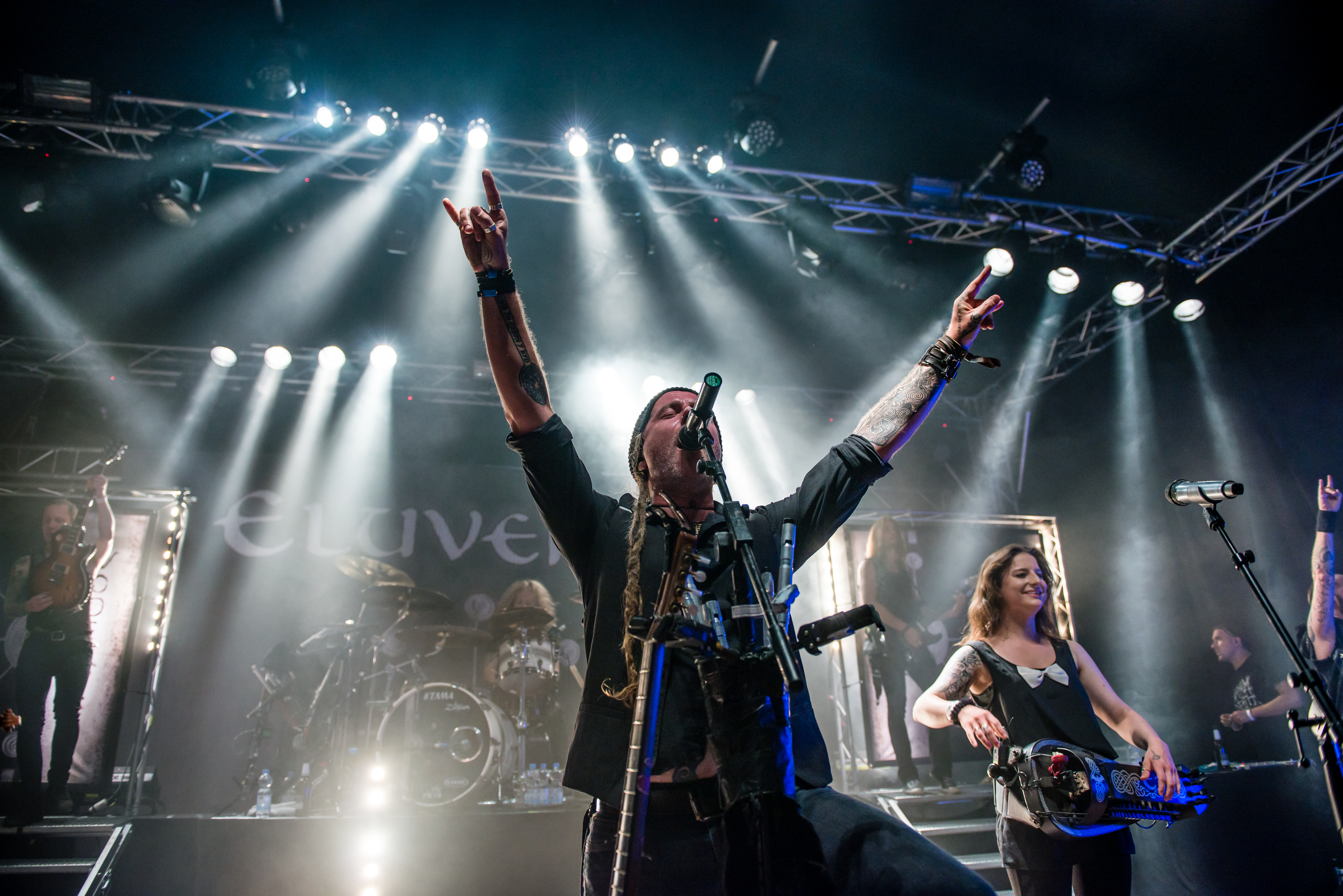
Eluveitie at Dong Open Air in 2015

On 3 August 2015, the band announced the departure of violinist Nicole Ansperger because her family situation, as she described, "...makes it impossible for me to be on the road with my band constantly." Israeli violinist Shir-Ran Yinon joined the group on tour as her replacement, having been selected through an open audition to which she had submitted a video.

On 5 May 2016, Merlin Sutter was replaced by Alain Ackermann, Anna Murphy was replaced by Michalina Malisz and Ivo Henzi was replaced by Jonas Wolf. Statements by the band and the three musicians indicated that Sutter had been expelled from the group, with Murphy and Henzi choosing to leave with him. The three stated that they would start producing new songs together while still making touring commitments with Eluveitie until their last concerts scheduled in June. They eventually started the band Cellar Darling.

In July 2016, the departure of Shir-Ran Yinon was announced, claiming that her contract had expired, and Nicole Ansperger returning to the band. In September, Eluveitie announced on Facebook that they started working on the second part of Evocation I: The Arcane Dominion. The album, entitled Evocation II: Pantheon, was released on 18 August 2017. In January 2017, the band unveiled their new line-up, with Fabienne Erni. Erni had been introduced to the band by Jonas Wolf, the two having met while attending a musical college in Denmark. Upon joining the band, Erni started learning to play the Celtic harp to compliment Eluveitie's assortment of folk and metal instruments and has taken on a position as frontwoman for the band.

=== Ategnatos and Ànv (2017–present) ===
On 14 October 2017, the band announced via social media that they were working on a new album, and were due to start recording after their Maximum Evocation tour. The band also revealed that they had recorded a single in advance of the tour, at Tommy Vetterli's New Sound Studio, entitled "Rebirth". The single was released on 27 October 2017, along with a music video produced by Oliver Sommer. "Rebirth" marked the first non-acoustic record produced by the new line-up. On the band's official Instagram account, it was announced the new album is called Ategnatos. It was released on 5 April 2019.

On 2 June 2022, the band released a brand new single "Aidus" along with a music video. On 5 July, the band announced that Michalina Malisz left the band on good terms. On 14 October, the band unveiled another single "Exile of the Gods" and its corresponding music video.

On 7 April 2023, Nicole Ansperger announced via social media that she was planning to leave Eluveitie. Despite this, on 25 January 2024, Ansperger confirmed she was still a member of the band, though five months later on 22 May, she revealed prior to that she had written a letter to the band informing of her wish to resign which they allegedly did not acknowledge and stated her reasons to leave following a dispute of her finance within the band. However, a week later on 29 May, Eluveitie confirmed Ansperger's departure and the arrival of her replacement Lea-Sophie Fischer.

== Musical style ==
Eluveitie infuses traditional Celtic folk melodies with Gothenburg-styled melodic death metal. Eluveitie uses traditional folk instruments in their music, such as fiddles, tin whistles and flutes, bagpipes and hurdy-gurdies. The traditional folk tunes in their songs have been drawn from various sources, including traditional Irish reels. While many of their lyrics are in English, some are in the ancient extinct Gaulish language. In some instances, the two languages are intertwined throughout a song. All of the lyrics on their 2009 release Evocation I: The Arcane Dominion are in Gaulish (except the first song "Sacrapos – At First Glance"). Their lyrics are based on texts written in Gaulish such as prayers, invocations of the gods and other spirits.

== Band members ==
Current

- Chrigel Glanzmann – unclean vocals, mandola, whistles, flutes, pipes, gaita, acoustic guitar, bodhrán, harp (2002–present); sitar (2018–present)
- Kay Brem – bass (2008–present)
- Rafael Salzmann – lead guitar (2012–present)
- Jonas Wolf – rhythm guitar (2016–present)
- Alain Ackermann – drums (2016–present)
- Fabienne Erni – clean vocals, celtic harp (2017–present)
- Lea-Sophie Fischer – violin, hurdy-gurdy (2024–present; touring musician 2023)

Former

- Philipp Reinmann – Irish bouzouki (2003–2004)
- Mättu Ackermann – violin (2003–2004)
- Yves Tribelhorn – lead guitar (2003–2004)
- Dani Fürer – rhythm guitar (2003–2004)
- Gian Albertin – bass, sound effects, backing vocals (2003–2004)
- Dario Hofstetter – drums (2003–2004)
- Dide Marfurt – hurdy-gurdy, bagpipes (2003–2005)
- Severin Binder – bagpipes, flutes, whistles, backing vocals (2004–2005)
- Linda Suter – violin, backing vocals (2004–2006)
- Sarah Wauquiez – hurdy-gurdy, crumhorn, accordion, backing vocals (2005–2006; guest 2009)
- Sevan Kirder – bagpipes, flutes, whistles, backing vocals (2003–2008)
- Rafi Kirder – bass, backing vocals (2004–2008)
- Siméon Koch – lead guitar, backing vocals (2004–2012)
- Meri Tadić – violin, backing vocals (2003–2013)
- Patrick "Päde" Kistler – bagpipes, whistles, backing vocals (2008–2014)
- Ivo Henzi – rhythm guitar (2004–2016)
- Merlin Sutter – drums (2004–2016)
- Anna Murphy – hurdy-gurdy, flutes, clean vocals, occasional unclean vocals (2006–2016)
- Shir-Ran Yinon – violin, backing vocals (2015–2016)
- Michalina Malisz – hurdy-gurdy (2016–2022)
- Nicole Ansperger – violin, backing vocals (2013–2015, 2016–2024)
- Annie Riediger – hurdy-gurdy (2022–2024)
- Matteo Sisti – bagpipes, tin whistles (2014–2025), hurdy-gurdy (2024–2025)

Former guest musicians

- Mina the Fiddler – 5-string viola (2009)
- Oliver s. Tyr – Irish bouzouki (2009)
- Alan Averill – vocals (2009)
- Torbjørn "Thebon" Schei – vocals (2010)
- Brendan Wade – uilleann pipes (2010)
- Dannii Young – spoken word (2010)
- Fredy Schnyder – hammered dulcimer (2009, 2011)

Live guest musicians

- Nicolas Winter – bass (2015–2016)
- Liv Kristine – vocals (2016)
- Martina Lory – vocals (2016)
- Laura Fella – vocals (2016)
- César Gonin – bass (2018)
- Carmen Busch – violin (2019–2022)
- Julie Bélanger Roy – violin (2019, 2023)
- Jukka Pelkonen – unclean vocals (2023)
- Adrienne Cowan – unclean vocals (2023)
- Yannick Urbanczik – bass (2023, 2025–present)
- Nils Fischer – bagpipes, whistle (2025–present)

Timeline

== Discography ==
- Spirit (2006)
- Slania (2008)
- Evocation I: The Arcane Dominion (2009)
- Everything Remains (As It Never Was) (2010)
- Helvetios (2012)
- Origins (2014)
- Evocation II: Pantheon (2017)
- Ategnatos (2019)
- Ànv (2025)
