= Spirit (Eluveitie album) =

Studio album by Eluveitie
- Released: 1 June 2006
- Recorded: December 2005
- Studios: Klangschmiede Studio E Ballhorn Studio (Kyburg, Zürich, Switzerland)
- Genres: Folk metal, melodic death metal, Celtic metal
- Length: 50:50
- Label: Fear Dark
- Producers: Eluveitie, Markus Stock and Tobias Schönemann

Eluveitie chronology
Vên (2004)	Spirit (2006)	Slania (2008)

Professional ratings
Review scores
Source	Rating
Chronicles of Chaos	7/10 stars
Ultimate Guitar	8/10 stars
Sputnikmusic	4.5/5 stars

Spirit is the debut studio album by Swiss folk metal band Eluveitie. It was released on June 1, 2006, by Fear Dark Records and re-released by Twilight Records in 2007.

== Track listing ==
All lyrics are written by Chrigel Glanzmann; all music is composed by Glanzmann, except "Of Fire, Wind & Wisdom" and "The Endless Knot" composed by Glanzmann and Ivo Henzi.

No.	Title	Length
1.	"Spirit"	2:32
2.	"Uis Elveti"	4:24
3.	"Your Gaulish War"	5:11
4.	"Of Fire, Wind & Wisdom"	3:05
5.	"Aidû"	3:10
6.	"The Song of Life"	4:01
7.	"Tegernakô"	6:42
8.	"Siraxta"	5:39
9.	"The Dance of Victory"	5:24
10.	"The Endless Knot"	7:00
11.	"AnDro"	3:35
Total length:		50:50

== Personnel ==
=== Eluveitie ===
- Chrigel Glanzmann - lead vocals, acoustic guitar, mandolin, tin Whistle, low whistle, bagpipes, Uilleann pipes
- Sarah Wauquiez - accordion, crumhorn, hurdy-gurdy, bass-shalm, clean vocals
- Simeon Koch - lead guitar
- Ivo Henzi - rhythm guitar
- Rafi Kirder - bass
- Merlin Sutter - drums
- Sevan Kirder - bagpipes, tin whistle, low whistle, Irish flute, backing vocals
- Meri Tadic - fiddle, backing vocals
- Linda Suter - fiddle, backing vocals

=== Guest musicians ===
- Toby Roth - accordion
- Guido Rieger - spoken words (track 1)
- Selina Wagner - children's voices (track 6)
- Adrian Wagner - children's voices (track 6)

=== Production ===
- Eluveitie - production
- Markus Stock - co-production, mixing, engineering
- Tobias Schönemann - co-production
- Martijn van Groeneveldt - mastering
- Klaus Grimmer - engineering
- Travis Smith - cover art, photography
- Ghislaine Ayer - photography
- Christoph Oeschger - photography
