= Alestorm discography =

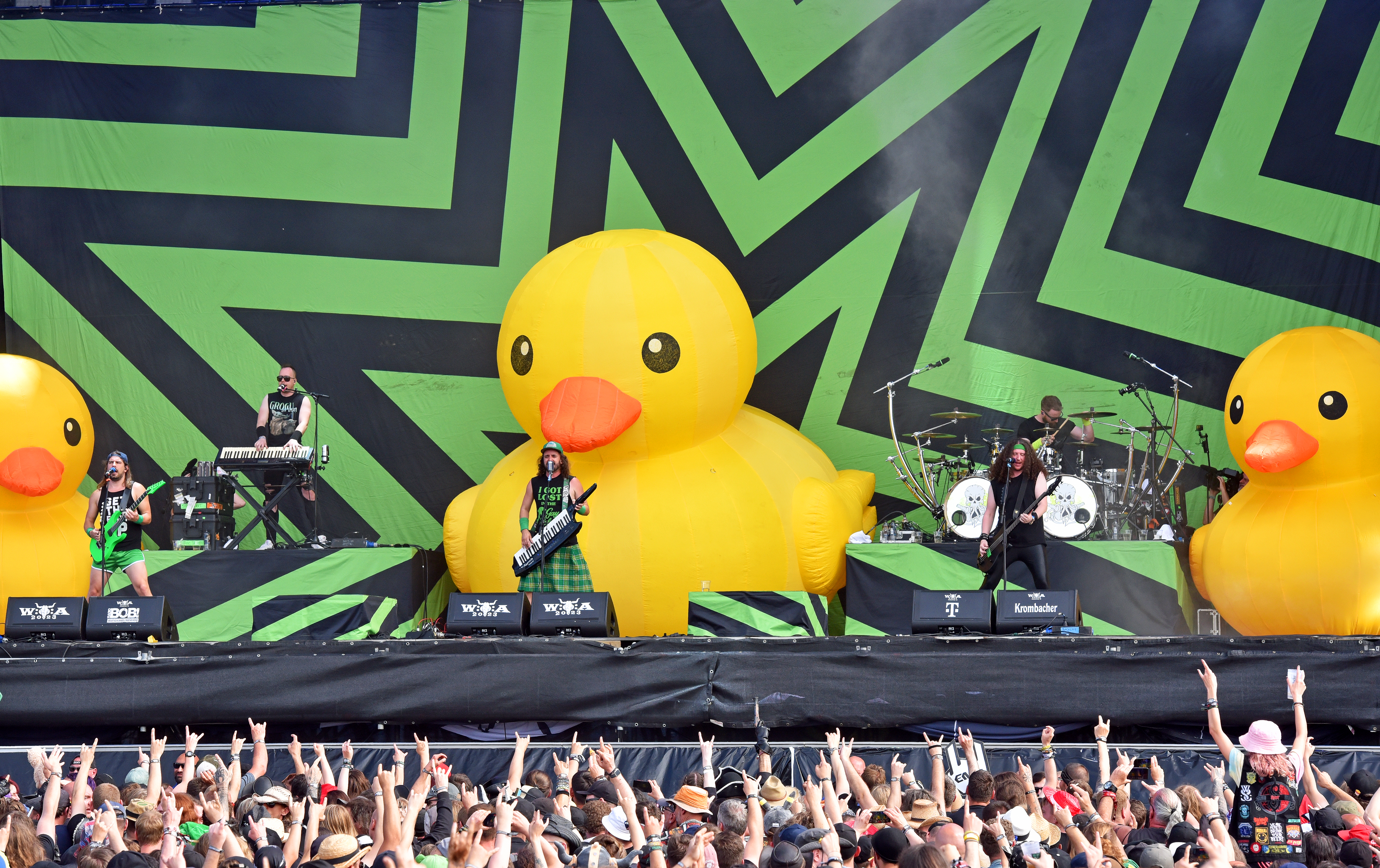
- Alestorm performing in 2023.
- Studio albums: 8
- EPs: 6
- Live albums: 2
- Singles: 20
- Music videos: 28

The Scottish heavy metal band Alestorm has released eight studio albums, six EPs, nineteen singles, two live albums, and twenty-seven music videos.

== Albums ==
=== Studio albums ===
Title	Details	Charts							Certifications
Title	Details	UK	AUT	GER	US Heat.	US Hard Rock	US Independent	HUN	Certifications
Captain Morgan's Revenge	Released: 25 January 2008; Label: Napalm; Formats: CD, LP, download	—	—	—	—	—	—	—	
Black Sails at Midnight	Released: 27 May 2009; Label: Napalm; Formats: CD, LP, download	—	—	60	87	—	—	—	
Back Through Time	Released: 3 June 2011; Label: Napalm; Formats: CD, LP, download	200	—	42	23	—	—	—	
Sunset on the Golden Age	Released: 1 August 2014; Label: Napalm; Formats: CD, LP, download	68	39	26	7	20	32	—	
No Grave But the Sea	Released: 26 May 2017; Label: Napalm; Formats: CD, LP, CS, download	50	15	14	1	14	5	—	
Curse of the Crystal Coconut	Released: 29 May 2020; Label: Napalm; Formats: CD, LP, CS, download, streaming	68	15	12	—	—	—	—	
Seventh Rum of a Seventh Rum	Released: 24 June 2022; Label: Napalm; Formats: CD, LP, CS, download, streaming	—	48	7	—	—	—	1	MAHASZ: Gold
The Thunderfist Chronicles	Released: 20 June 2025; Label: Napalm; Label: Napalm; Formats: CD, LP, CS, download, streaming	—	13	15	—	—	—	1	
Infinite Seas of Stellar Damnation	Scheduled: 2027; Label: Napalm; Label: Napalm; Formats: CD, LP, CS, download, streaming	—	—	—	—	—	—	—	

=== Live albums ===
Title	Details
Live at the End of the World	Released: 18 November 2013; Label: Napalm; Formats: DVD, CD, download
Live in Tilburg	Released: 28 May 2021; Label: Napalm; Formats: Blu-ray, DVD, CD, LP, download, streaming

== EPs ==
Title	Details
Battleheart	Released: 2006; Label: Self-released; Formats: Download
Terror on the High Seas	Released: 2007; Label: Self-released; Formats: Download
Leviathan	Released: 27 January 2009; Label: Napalm; Formats: CD, download
Skalstorm (split 7-inch with Skalmold)	Released: 30 September 2016; Label: Napalm; Formats: Download, LP
The Treasure Chest EP	Released: 30 April 2020; Label: Napalm; Formats: CD, download, streaming
Voyage of the Dead Marauder	Released: 22 March 2024; Label: Napalm; Formats: CD, download, streaming

== Singles ==
Title	Album	Details
"P Is for Pirate"	Black Sails at Midnight (iTunes exclusive)	Released: 29 May 2009; Label: Napalm Records; Formats: Download
"You Are a Pirate"	Back Through Time (limited edition exclusive); You Are a Pirate	Released: 3 June 2011; Label: Napalm Records; Formats: Download
"In the Navy" (The Village People cover)	Non-album single	Released:18 November 2013; Label: Napalm Records; Formats: Download, LP
"Kvaðning"	Skálstorm	Released: 9 September 2016; Label: Napalm Records; Formats: Download
"Alestorm"	No Grave But the Sea	Released: 21 April 2017; Label: Napalm Records; Formats: Download
"Mexico"	No Grave But the Sea	Released: 5 May 2017; Label: Napalm Records; Formats: Download
"Flipped with a Sausage" / "Pirate Pizza Party"	Non-album single	Released: 26 May 2017; Label: Napalm Records; Formats: Download
"Treasure Chest Party Quest"	Curse of the Crystal Coconut	Released: 2 April 2020; Label: Napalm Records; Formats: Download
"Tortuga"	Curse of the Crystal Coconut	Released: 23 April 2020; Label: Napalm Records; Formats: Download
"Fannybaws"	Curse of the Crystal Coconut	Released:14 May 2020; Label: Napalm Records; Formats: Download
"Big Ship Little Ship" / "Bassline Junkie" (Dizzee Rascal cover)	Non-album singles	Released: 29 May 2020; Label: Napalm Records; Formats: Download
"Chicken on a Raft"	Non-album singles	Released: 28 May 2020; Label: Napalm Records; Formats: Download
"The Wellerman"	Non-album singles	Released: 28 May 2020; Label: Napalm Records; Formats: Download
"Magellan's Expedition"	Seventh Rum of a Seventh Rum	Released: 6 April 2022; Label: Napalm Records; Formats: Download
"P.A.R.T.Y."	Seventh Rum of a Seventh Rum	Released: 4 May 2022; Label: Napalm Records; Formats: Download
"The Battle of Cape Fear River"	Seventh Rum of a Seventh Rum	Released: 1 June 2022; Label: Napalm Records; Formats: Download
"Seventh Rum of a Seventh Rum"	Seventh Rum of a Seventh Rum	Released: 22 June 2022; Label: Napalm Records; Formats: Download
"Frozen Piss 2"	The Thunderfist Chronicles	Released: 29 April 2025; Label: Napalm Records; Formats: Download
"Killed to Death by Piracy"	The Thunderfist Chronicles	Released: 20 May 2025; Label: Napalm Records; Formats: Download
"The Storm"	The Thunderfist Chronicles	Released: 18 June 2025; Label: Napalm Records; Formats: Download

== Music videos ==
Year	Song	Album	Director	Ref
2009	"Nancy the Tavern Wench"	Captain Morgan's Revenge	Unknown	
2009	"Keelhauled"	Black Sails at Midnight	Silvan Büge	
2011	"Shipwrecked"	Back Through Time	Ivan Colic	
2012	"Death Throes of the Terrorsquid"	Back Through Time	Ivan Colic	
2013	"In the Navy" (The Village People cover)	In the Navy	Tommy Jones	
2014	"Drink"	Sunset on the Golden Age	Oliver Sommer	
2015	"Magnetic North"	Sunset on the Golden Age	Ivan Colic	
2017	"Alestorm"	No Grave But The Sea	Ivan Colic	
2017	"Mexico"	No Grave But The Sea	Ivan Colic	
2017	"Fucked with an Anchor"	No Grave But The Sea	Elliot Vernon	
2020	"Treasure Chest Party Quest"	Curse of the Crystal Coconut	Ivan Colic	
2020	"Tortuga" feat. Captain Yarrface	Curse of the Crystal Coconut	Elliot Vernon	
2020	"Fannybaws"	Curse of the Crystal Coconut	Ivan Colic	
2020	"Pirate Metal Drinking Crew"	Curse of the Crystal Coconut	Elliot Vernon	
2020	"Shit Boat (No Fans)"	Curse of the Crystal Coconut	Simon Norton	
2020	"Big Ship Little Ship"	Non-album single	Elliot Vernon	
2022	"Zombies Ate My Pirate Ship"	Curse of the Crystal Coconut	Péter Lerch	
2022	"Magellan's Expedition"	Seventh Rum of a Seventh Rum	Unknown	
2022	"P.A.R.T.Y."	Seventh Rum of a Seventh Rum	Alex Henderson	
2022	"Battle of Cape Fear River"	Seventh Rum of a Seventh Rum	Viktor Nagy	
2022	"Seventh Rum of a Seventh Rum"	Seventh Rum of a Seventh Rum	Elliot Vernon	
2022	"Come to Brazil"	Seventh Rum of a Seventh Rum	Elliot Vernon	
2024	"Voyage of the Dead Marauder"	Voyage of the Dead Marauder	Mirko Witzki	
2024	"Uzbekistan"	Voyage of the Dead Marauder	Elliot Vernon	
2024	"The Last Saskatchewan Pirate"	Voyage of the Dead Marauder	Niek van de Vondervoort	
2025	"Frozen Piss 2"	The Thunderfist Chronicles	Niek van de Vondervoort	
2025	"Killed to Death by Piracy"	The Thunderfist Chronicles	Alex Henderson	
2025	"The Storm"	The Thunderfist Chronicles	Sebastian Pielnik	
