= Black Sails at Midnight =

Studio album by Alestorm
- Released: 27 May 2009
- Genre: Power metal; folk metal; pirate metal; heavy metal
- Length: 46:19
- Label: Napalm
- Producer: Lasse Lammert

Alestorm chronology
Captain Morgan's Revenge (2008)	Black Sails at Midnight (2009)	Back Through Time (2011)

Professional ratings
Review scores
Source	Rating
About.com	4/5 stars
Allmusic	3.5/5 stars
Rock Sound	8/10 stars

Black Sails at Midnight is the second studio album by Scottish heavy metal band Alestorm. As with their first album, all the drums tracks were recorded by session drummer Migo Wagner but touring drummer Ian Wilson added additional percussion. The album features string and brass arrangements and folk instruments as opposed to the more heavy metal instrumentation of Captain Morgan's Revenge. The special edition of the album included a live DVD of the band's performance at the 2008 Wacken Festival.

== Track listing ==
No.	Title	Writer(s)	Length
1.	"The Quest"	Christopher Bowes	4:59
2.	"Leviathan"	Bowes	6:00
3.	"That Famous Ol' Spiced"	Bowes, Joe McQuade	4:45
4.	"Keelhauled"	Bowes	3:44
5.	"To the End of Our Days"	Bowes, Tim Shaw, McQuade	6:25
6.	"Black Sails at Midnight"	Bowes, Shaw	3:31
7.	"No Quarter"	Bowes	3:02
8.	"Pirate Song"	Bowes, McQuade	4:01
9.	"Chronicles of Vengeance"	Bowes, Shaw, McQuade	6:30
10.	"Wolves of the Sea" (Pirates of the Sea cover)	Jonas Liberg, Johan Sahlen, Claes Andreasson, Torbjörn Wassenius	3:33
Total length:			46:19

iTunes exclusive bonus track
No.	Title	Writer(s)	Length
11.	"P Is for Pirate"	Bowes	0:50
Total length:			47:09

== Song information ==
"No Quarter" was previously a demo recording by Battleheart, Alestorm's name before signing with Napalm Records. The signing with Napalm necessitated a name change to avoid confusion with Battlelore. A part of the song contains Alestorm's rendition of the Pirates of the Caribbean theme. "Wolves of the Sea" and "Leviathan" are re-recorded tracks which previously appeared on the Leviathan EP. "P is for Pirate" is a comedy a capella track based on the Sesame Street song C Is For Cookie that is only available on the iTunes version of the album. It features the band singing about how much they love being pirates and their belief that pirates are much better than ninjas.

On 27 March 2009, a split album titled "Black Sails Over Europe" was released on Napalm Records, which features "That Famous Ol' Spiced", "Keelhauled", and "Wolves of the Sea", alongside recordings by Týr and Heidevolk. It was limited to 1000 copies.

On 26 June 2009, a video was released for the song "Keelhauled". Alestorm's first music video. The beginning of the video depicts Christopher Bowes standing up in front of the rest of the crew urging them to allow guitarist Dani Evans to be keelhauled, following a theft. He is promptly keelhauled in a rather realistic manner. As he is keelhauled scenes of the band drinking, gambling and engaging in sexual activity aboard the pirate ship are shown. It became one of Alestorm's most successful music videos and has 27 million views on YouTube (2024).

== Release history ==
Country	Date
Finland	27 May 2009
Spain	27 May 2009
Germany	29 May 2009
Italy
Europe	1 June 2009
United States	2 June 2009

== Personnel ==
- Christopher Bowes - vocals, keyboards, tin whistle
- Ian Wilson - percussion, vibraslap, backing vocals
- Dani Evans - bass, guitars, backing vocals

=== Additional personnel and staff ===
- Justus Twele - bagpipes
- Bee Bloodpunch - backing vocals
- Heinrich Gimpel - bass trombone
- Carsten Petersen - trumpet, cornet
- Tobias Hain - trumpet
- Mirjam Beyer - violin
- Lasse Lammert - guitars, backing vocals, producer, mixing, recording
- Tim Shaw - backing vocals
- Brendan Casey - backing vocals
- Migo Wagner - drums
- James Murphy - mastering
- Gordon Krei - brass arrangements
- Ingo Römling - cover art

== Bonus DVD - Live at Wacken 2008 ==
- Intro (Bowes)
- Over the Seas (Bowes)
- The Huntmaster (Bowes)
- Death Before the Mast (Bowes/Harper/McQuade)
- Nancy the Tavern Wench (Bowes)
- Set Sail and Conquer (Bowes/Harper)
- Wenches and Mead (Bowes)
- Captain Morgan's Revenge (Bowes)

=== Wacken 2008 line-up ===
- Christopher Bowes - Lead Vocals; Keyboards
- Gavin Harper - Lead Guitars; Backing Vocals
- Dani Evans - Bass Guitars; Backing Vocals
- Alex Tabisz - Drums

== Charts ==
Chart (2009)	Peak position
German Albums (Offizielle Top 100)	60
UK Independent Albums (OCC)	14
UK Rock & Metal Albums (OCC)	17
US Heatseekers Albums (Billboard)	87
