= Claim the Throne =

Australian metal band

- Origin: Perth, Western Australia, Australia
- Genres: Folk metal, melodic death metal
- Years active: 2004–present
- Label: Prime Cuts
- Members: Brendon Capriotti; Glen Dyson; Jesse Millea; Ashley Large; Jim Parker
- Website: www.claimthethrone.com

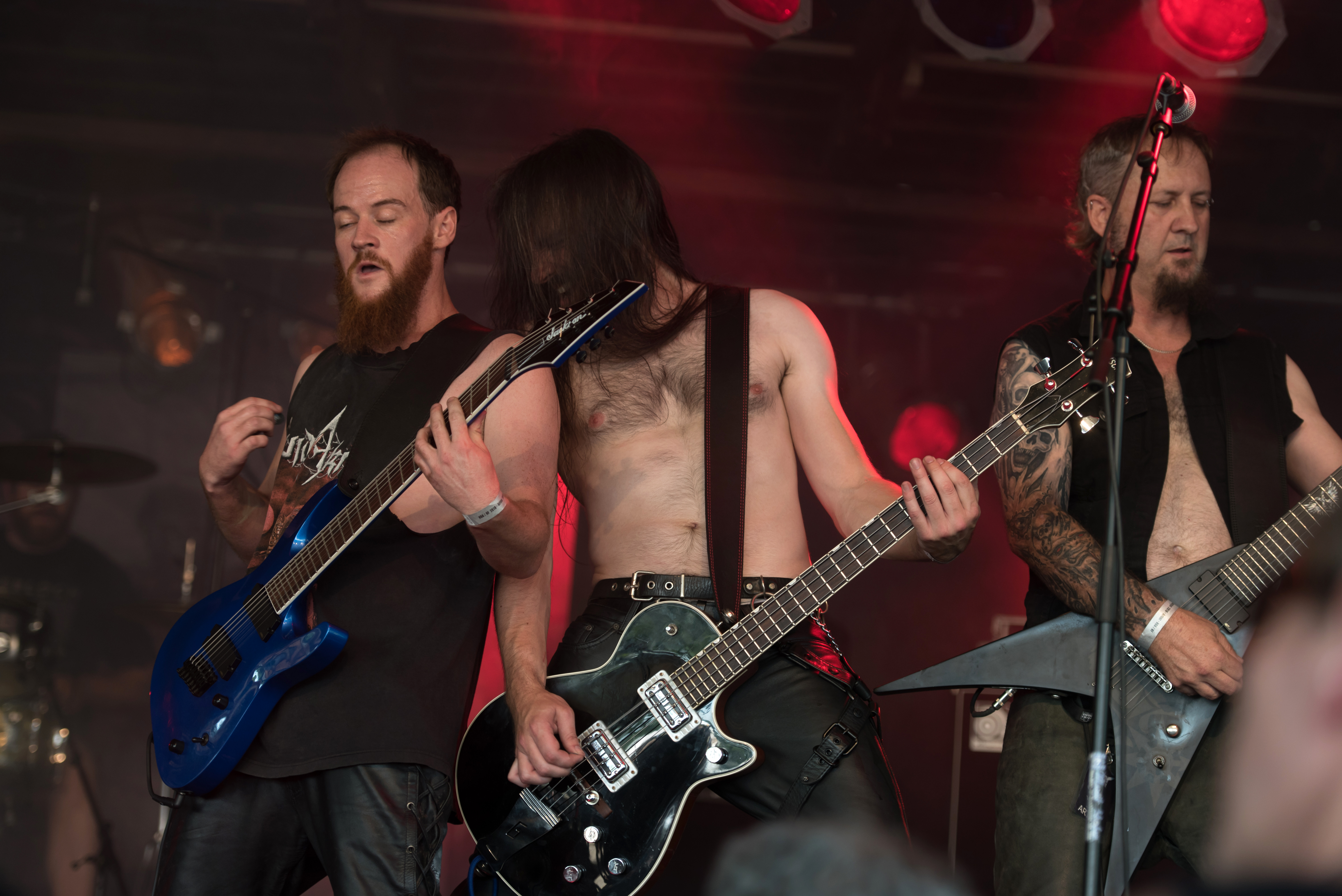
Claim the Throne 2018

Claim the Throne are a melodic death band with strong folk metal influence, from Perth, Western Australia. In 2008 they released their debut album Only the Brave Return that also included a matching fantasy novel written by the band members.

2009 saw the release of their EP Ale Tales through Prime Cuts Music, which also featured a DVD including a music video and behind the scenes footage the Only the Brave Return release party. The music took a change in direction with fast up-beat songs short in length. The track 'Set Sail on Ale' was used for the band's first music video, and was nominated for the WAM Song of the Year in the Heavy category. In June 2010 they embarked on an Australian national tour as the main support for Scottish pirate metal band Alestorm, and in March 2011 they were the main support for Finnish folk metal band Finntroll. They also played local support slots with bands such as Arch Enemy and Suffocation.

In December 2010, the second full-length album was released, called Triumph and Beyond. This music style was described as a combination of the first 2 releases, but with far better production, and took the band on further extensive tours of Australia, New Zealand, and a UK tour with Alestorm in 2012.

In September 2013, Claim The Throne released their highly regarded Forged In Flame album. With 14 tracks and 70 minute running time, and a music video for the song "Zephyrus", this album received rave reviews worldwide and the band continued their heavy touring of Australia to support its release, including a tour with fellow Australian melodic death band Belakor. Since then they have performed at a number of festivals, including Hammmersonic, Fanatik, Hell On The Bay, and were the first Australian band to appear on the 70000 Tons of Metal Cruise. They toured through South Korea and Japan with bands such as Catamenia, Dark Lunacy and Mercenary, and in January 2015 they undertook a headlining tour of USA and Canada. Back in Australia, they played local support slots for Cradle Of Filth, Moonsorrow, Fleshgod Apocalypse and Septic Flesh.

In 2013 the band started their own podcast, with topics based on DIY musician help and interviewing prominent figures of the music industry. There are already over 50 episodes.

Claim The Throne released their fourth full-length album On Desolate Plains in October 2017, and toured for its release through Australia and Japan.

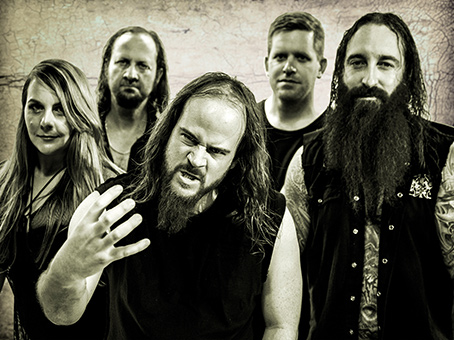
Claim The Throne (2017)

== Members ==
=== Current members ===
- Brendon Capriotti - vocals, guitars (2004–present) (member of Red Descending)
- Glen Dyson - guitars, vocals (2010–present) (Choke Ex-Member, Member of bands Cuntscrape, Chainsaw Charlie And The Chocolate Cha Cha Factory)
- Jim Parker - bass, vocals (2004–present) (ex-member of Disentomb, Earth Rot, member of Entrails Eradicated, and Chainsaw Charlie And The Chocolate Cha Cha Factory)
- Jesse Millea - keyboards, vocals (2009–present)
- Ashley Large - drums (2010–present) (Dyscord ex-member)

=== Former members ===
- Oliver Soos - guitar (2004–2010)
- Brenton Pedler - drums (2004–2010)
- Nicole Capriotti - keyboards (2004–2008)

Timeline

== Discography ==
- 2008 – Only The Brave Return (Album)
- 2008 – Only The Brave Return (Book)
- 2009 – Aletales(EP/DVD)
- 2010 – Triumph and Beyond (Album)
- 2012 – Cabba Sings Claim The Throne (Online Only)
- 2013 – Forged In Flame (Album)
- 2014 – Aletales / Triumph & Beyond (Double album re-release)
- 2017 – On Desolate Plains (Album)
