= Donkey Kong Country (TV series) =

Animated television series

- Based on: Donkey Kong by Nintendo; Donkey Kong Country by Nintendo and Rare
- Developed by: Jacques Goldstein; Philippe Percebois
- Directed by: Mike Fallows
- Voices of: Richard Yearwood; Andrew Sabiston; Joy Tanner; Aron Tager; Ben Campbell; Adrian Truss; Stevie Vallance; Donald Burda; Len Carlson; Damon D'Oliveira; Lawrence Bayne; Rick Jones
- Theme music composer: Pure West
- Opening theme: "Donkey Kong Country"
- Ending theme: "Donkey Kong Country" (instrumental)
- Composer: Pure West
- Countries of origin: Canada; France (season 1); Taiwan (season 2)
- Original language: English
- No. of seasons: 2
- No. of episodes: 40 (list of episodes)

Production
- Executive producers: Dale A. Andrews; Patrick Loubert; Michael Hirsh; Clive A. Smith; Gérard Mital (Season 1); Jacques Peyrache (Season 1)
- Producers: Maia Tubiana (Season 1); Stephen Hodgins (Season 2); Patricia R. Burns (Season 1); Pam Lehn (Season 2)
- Editor: Samuel Lajus
- Running time: 30 minutes (per episode)
- Production companies: Nelvana Limited; Medialab (Season 1); Hong Guang Animation (Su Zhou) Co., Ltd. (CGCG) (Season 2); WIC Entertainment Ltd.

Original release
- Network: Teletoon (Canada); France 2 and Canal+ (France)
- Release: August 15, 1997 – July 7, 2000

Donkey Kong Country is a 1996 animated television series based on the video game Donkey Kong Country from Nintendo and Rare, co-produced by Nelvana Limited, Medialab Studio L.A. (Season 1) and Hong Guang Animation (Su Zhou) (Season 2), in association with WIC Entertainment, with the participation of Teletoon—for Season 1, it was produced in co-production with France 2, Canal+, and produced in association with Valor 4.

The show first premiered in France on September 4, 1996, on France 2, on a hybrid live-action and performance-capture-animated block titled La Planète de Donkey Kong. It was later broadcast in Canada from August 15, 1997, to July 7, 2000 on Teletoon.

Donkey Kong Country is the first television series to be primarily animated using performance capture technology. Several elements of the series, such as the Crystal Coconut, appeared in later Donkey Kong video games like Donkey Kong 64 (itself released three years after the show began airing on television). The second season was produced by Taiwanese CG studio CGCG (which featured updated character models, silkier lighting and key framing as opposed to performance capture), and was first announced in May 1999.

== Plot ==
Taking place on Kongo Bongo Island, it focuses on Donkey Kong, the island's resident hero. Before the events of the series, he was chosen as the island's future ruler by a mystical artifact known as the Crystal Coconut, which is connected to a spiritual temple known as Inka Dinka Doo. In the present, Donkey Kong must prove he deserves the role through his heroics and by guarding the Crystal Coconut.

Alongside allies such as his friend and sidekick Diddy Kong and his mentor Cranky Kong, he must protect the Crystal Coconut from threats, most notably King K. Rool who tries to steal it in order to rule Kongo Bongo Island. Donkey Kong has to juggle his guardian duties with his social life and his relationship with Candy Kong.

Each episode features two songs performed by the characters.

== Cast and characters ==
Season 1 of the French version was recorded in Quebec, with the exception of Donkey Kong, Diddy Kong and Funky Kong's voice actors who are from France. Season 2 was not given a French version until its DVD release several years later, which mostly features a new French voice cast with the exception of Donkey Kong and Funky Kong's voice actors. Hervé Grull never returned as Diddy Kong, as he had long since hit puberty, and was replaced by Lucile Boulanger as a result.

=== Game characters ===
Donkey Kong
Voiced by: Franck Capillery (French); Richard Yearwood (English); Sterling Jarvis (English singing voice)
The strong yet steady future ruler of Kongo Bongo Island, who is tasked with guarding the Crystal Coconut. His catchphrase is "Banana Slamma" when he fights.
Diddy Kong
Voiced by: Hervé Grull (French, Season 1); Lucile Boulanger (French, Season 2); Donald Reignoux (French singing voice, Season 2); Andrew Sabiston (English)
Donkey Kong's sidekick and buddy, who is a fan of shows. He and Donkey Kong take turns acting as the voice of reason for one another.
Cranky Kong
Voiced by: Yves Massicotte (French, Season 1); Yves Barsacq (French, Season 2); Aron Tager (English)
Donkey Kong and Diddy's wise mentor. He enjoys playing the organ and making potions to solve the heroes' problems. The Crystal Coconut is stored in a globe inside his tree house cabin.
Funky Kong
Voiced by: Emmanuel Curtil (French); Damon D'Oliveira (English)
The eccentric friend of Donkey Kong, who enjoys surfing and believes in the spiritual. He owns Funky's Flights and flies the others around the island in order to help them get around.
Candy Kong
Voiced by: Camille Cyr-Desmarais (French, Season 1); Odile Schmitt (French, Season 2); Joy Tanner (English)
Donkey Kong's headstrong yet short-tempered girlfriend, who works at the Barrelworks factory as its only employee. She frequently pines for a promotion from her boss and has even fantasized about owning the factory. She is usually Donkey Kong's motivation to do the right thing.
Dixie Kong
Voiced by: Violette Chauveau (French, Season 1); Annie Barclay (French, Season 2); Stevie Vallance (English)
Diddy's sweet yet naive girlfriend, and Candy's friend.
King K. Rool
Voiced by: Éric Gaudry (French, Season 1); Daniel Beretta (French, Season 2); Benedict Campbell (English)
The leader of the Kremling army, who attempts to try to steal the Crystal Coconut and take over the island. He lives in a cave resembling a reptilian skull.
Krusha
Voiced by: Pierre Auger (French, Season 1); Daniel Beretta (French, Season 2); Len Carlson (English)
King K. Rool's bodyguard.
General Klump
Voiced by: Jean Brousseau (French, Season 1); Jacques Bouanich (French, Season 2); Adrian Truss (English)
King K. Rool's general.
Kritters
Voiced by: Michel Tugot-Doris (French, Season 2); Lawrence Bayne (English)
King K. Rool's soldiers.
Klap Traps
Small crocodiles who like to eat wooden surfaces in a manner similar to termites. They are fired out of Klap-Blasters by the Kritters.

=== Show-original characters ===
Bluster Kong
Voiced by: Daniel Lesourd (French, Season 1); Patrice Dozier (French, Season 2); Donald Burda (English)
The wealthy, morally ambiguous boss of the Barrelworks factory, who is jealous of Donkey Kong on occasion and makes unsuccessful attempts to impress his employee, Candy. He has an ego, but is cowardly. A running gag involves him calling his disapproving mother, from whom he will soon inherit the factory, to bail him out.
Kaptain Skurvy
Voiced by: Ron Rubin (English)
A pirate captain and Klump's long-lost brother. He persists in chasing the Crystal Coconut, claiming it to be the right of one of his ancestors.
Kutlass and Green Kroc
Voiced by: John Stocker and Richard Newman (English)
Kaptain Skurvy's minions. Green Kroc is a Kritter, while Kutlass resembles King K. Rool with a light scale tone.
Polly Roger
Voiced by: Rick Jones (English)
A pet parrot of Kaptain Skurvy.
Jr. Klap Trap
Voiced by: Ron Rubin (English)
A large Klaptrap who frequently has his dentures stolen, and will do a favor for anyone who retrieves them for him.
Eddie the Mean Old Yeti
Voiced by: Patrice Dozier (French, Season 2); Len Carlson (English)
A yeti who lives in the snowy White Mountains of Kongo Bongo Island.
Kong Fu
Voiced by: Richard Newman (English)
A kung fu fighter who is hired by King K. Rool to defeat Donkey Kong in a contest.
Baby Kong
Voiced by: Bryn McAuley (English)
A baby seen under the care of Candy Kong and Dixie Kong in "Baby Kong Blues".
Inka Dinka Doo
Voiced by: Lawrence Bayne (English)
The spiritual temple idol from where the Crystal Coconut came. It was he who selected Donkey Kong to be the future ruler. He appears as a stone column on which expressions are carved. One stone block turns around to show the appropriate expression for his mood.

== Episodes ==
Season	Episodes	Originally released	
Season	Episodes	First released	Last released
1	26	August 15, 1997	December 29, 1998
2	14	December 2, 1999	July 7, 2000

== Production ==
Medialab acquired the rights from Nintendo to produce an animated series based on the Donkey Kong Country video game series. 13 episodes were written, but the original scripts for said episodes contained "racist/sexist jokes" that were considered inappropriate for the show. Medialab fired the original writers and asked Nelvana for assistance. As the storyboards for 10 of the scripts had already been produced, Nelvana decided to write new stories based around the storyboards to save money. When the writers had finalized the characters' roles and personalities, artist Phil Mendez drew the concept sketches and character designs, keeping their appearances simple and geometric to make them easier to convert into three-dimensional models. The 3D modellers grouped the Kong and Kremling characters (who shared similar bodies) into "families" and used them as a base to create the individual models in Alias/Wavefront, where they also built the skeletons. Clay maquettes of the characters' heads were made, before they were then digitized. Writer Erika Strobel stated that she enjoyed writing dialogue for the characters Funky Kong, King K. Rool, General Klump and Kaptain Skurvy, but disliked Candy Kong's design, likening it to a "burn victim".

Over seventy percent of the character animation in the series was produced using performance capture. (Note: Attributed to multiple references:) Two performers were required for each character; one performed the character's body movements, while the other used hand movements to control the character's face. The limitations of the technology used meant that actions like picking an object up could not be produced with this method and had to be keyframed. Producer Maia Tubiana stated that making the character models required "experimentation, discipline, and the ability to live with a few compromises", with one example being to shorten King K. Rool's cape. This process allowed the character animation of one episode to be completed in two weeks, as compared to the six to eight weeks keyframed animation was estimated to require for the same length.

The show's background music, including the theme song and the songs in the episodes, were written by Pure West Music (Paul Koffman and Timothy Foy).

Former Rare developer Steve Mayles stated that the development team for the Donkey Kong Country games was not involved in the show's production. Developer Gregg Mayles disliked King K. Rool's depiction in the show, and Kevin Bayliss called Donkey Kong's design in the show "hideous".

== Telecast and home media ==
Donkey Kong Country was first introduced in France on September 4, 1996, on France 2, on a block titled La Planète de Donkey Kong (The Planet of Donkey Kong). The French-language version of the show later premiered in Canada on Télétoon on September 8, 1997, making the series one of the channel's launch programs, while the English version premiered on its English counterpart on October 17, also as a launch program. In the U.S., it was one of the first series to be shown on Fox Family (now Freeform), in which the series was broadcast in its entirety from August 15, 1998 (the same day that Fox Family was launched) until 2000. It was also seen on Fox Kids from 1998 until 1999 for a short time airing two episodes as specials on December 19, 1998, and aired a few more episodes during the summer of 1999 before being taken off. 40 episodes were produced. In Japan, the series aired with a Japanese dub and took over TV Tokyo's 6:30 p.m. time-slot from Gokudo the Adventurer airing on October 1, 1999, and was later replaced with Hamtaro after ending on June 30, 2000.

Over the years, the show has been released throughout many VHS and DVDs in many countries. In total, 13 DVDs around the world were released with English audio.

For North America, four episodes of Donkey Kong Country that feature Kaptain Skurvy were edited together into a videocassette release titled Donkey Kong Country: The Legend of the Crystal Coconut and was marketed as a feature-length anthology film. However, these episodes are not in chronological order, as a flashback shown in the third episode actually occurs in the fourth episode of the tape. It was released in Canada November 9, 1999 with both English and French dub tapes separately with distribution handled by Seville Pictures and Nelvana themselves as the secondary distributor. The US version of the tape was distributed by Paramount Home Video and was released in the country on November 9, 1999, marking this the only time that the U.S. had a VHS release of this series. France has gotten a release of this tape as well under the title Donkey Kong Le Film!

In the PAL regions, Donkey Kong Country Vol. 1 (released in Australia) and Donkey Kong Country - Bad Hair Day (released in the United Kingdom) were released on DVD. The other two DVDs, Donkey Kong Country: Hooray for Holly Kongo Bongo and Donkey Kong Country: The Kongo Bongo Festival of Lights (both released in Australia) only held one episode. After over three years of no new English DVD, I Spy With My Hairy Eye was released in the United Kingdom in 2008.

In 2013, Phase 4 Films, a small Canadian low-budget film company, officially purchased the rights to license and distribute the series for a DVD release in Region 1 along with Sony Pictures Home Entertainment and started releasing episodes beginning with the He Came, He Saw, He Kong-quered DVD that was released on August 20. The Complete First Season was then released on DVD in Region 1 on May 12, 2015.

In 2017, Pidax Film has gotten the distribution rights in Germany to release all 14 episodes of Season 2 on DVD with English and German dubbing audio included.

As of 2023, the show is now added on the Tubi streaming service as well with Pluto TV, but the first two seasons are available on Freevee and on Amazon Video with advertisements.

In 2024, the show began broadcasting on Kartoon Studio's channel Video Game Heroes through the FAST service Samsung TV Plus.

The episodes of the show are all available for subscription on iTunes and on the Amazon Prime's Ameba channel.

Thirty-nine out of 40 episodes are available on Nelvana's Retro Rerun YouTube channel.

Name	Release date	Episodes	Region	Additional information
The Legend of the Crystal Coconut (English); Donkey Kong Country: La Légende de la noix de coco en cristal (French)	1999 (Canada); November 9, 1999 (USA)	4	VHS	Includes Legend of the Crystal Coconut, Bug a Boogie, Ape-Nesia, and Booty and the Beast edited together in a feature-length format. A French dub release for Canada was also released.
Donkey Kong Le Film!	TBA	4	VHS	French dubbed version of the Legend of the Crystal Coconut compilation feature, release for France.
ドンキーコング Vol. 1 (Donkey Kong Vol. 1)	June 21, 2000	3	VHS	Includes Japanese dubbed versions of Episodes 1-3 (Bad Hair Day, Ape Foo Young and Booty and the Beast).
ドンキーコング Vol. 2 (Donkey Kong Vol. 2)	June 21, 2000	3	VHS	Includes Japanese dubbed versions of Episodes 4-6 (Barrel, Barrel... Who's Got the Barrel, Kong for a Day and Raiders of the Lost Banana).
ドンキーコング Vol. 3 (Donkey Kong Vol. 3)	June 21, 2000	3	VHS	Includes Japanese dubbed versions of Episodes 7-9 (From Zero to Hero, Buried Treasure and Cranky's Tickle Tonic).
ドンキーコング Vol. 4 (Donkey Kong Vol. 4)	August 19, 2000	3	VHS	Includes Japanese dubbed versions of Episodes 10-12 (Orangutango, Double Date Trouble and The Curse of Kongo Bongo).
ドンキーコング Vol.5 (Donkey Kong Vol. 5)	August 19, 2000	3	VHS	Includes Japanese dubbed versions of Episodes 13-15 (Speed, Get a Life, Don't Save One and The Big Chill Out).
ドンキーコング Vol.6 (Donkey Kong Vol. 6)	August 19, 2000	3	VHS	Includes Japanese dubbed versions of Episodes 16-18 (To the Moon Baboon, I Spy with My Hairy Eye and Klump's Lumps).
ドンキーコング Vol.7 (Donkey Kong Vol. 7)	October 21, 2000	3	VHS	Includes Japanese dubbed versions of Episodes 19-21 (Kong Fu, Bluster's Sale Ape-Stravaganza and Legend of the Crystal Coconut).
ドンキーコング Vol.8 (Donkey Kong Vol. 8)	October 21, 2000	3	VHS	Includes Japanese dubbed versions of Episodes 22-24 (Watch the Skies, Bug a Boogie and Baby Kong Blues).
ドンキーコング Vol.9 (Donkey Kong Vol. 9)	October 21, 2000	3	VHS	Includes Japanese dubbed versions of Episodes 25-27 (Ape-Nesia, A Thin Line Between Love & Ape and The Day the Island Stood Still).
ドンキーコング Vol.10 (Donkey Kong Vol. 10)	December 21, 2000	3	VHS	Includes Japanese dubbed versions of Episodes 28-30 (Hooray for Holly-Kongo Bongo, The Kongo Bongo Festival of Lights and Speak No Evil, Dude).
ドンキーコング Vol.11 (Donkey Kong Vol. 11)	December 21, 2000	3	VHS	Includes Japanese dubbed versions of Episodes 31-33 (Monkey Seer, Monkey Do, Four Weddings and a Coconut and Vote of Kong-Fidence).
ドンキーコング Vol.12 (Donkey Kong Vol. 12)	December 21, 2000	3	VHS	Includes Japanese dubbed versions of Episodes 34-36 (Follow That Coconut, The Big Switch-A-Roo and Hunka Hunka Burnin' Bluster).
ドンキーコング Vol.13 (Donkey Kong Vol. 13)	December 21, 2000	3	VHS	Includes Japanese dubbed versions of Episodes 37-39 (Best of Enemies, Just Kidding and It's a Wonderful Life).
Donkey Kong Country - Vol. 1	TBA	4	4	Includes Hooray for Holly-Kongo Bongo, The Kongo Bongo Festival of Lights, Speak No Evil, Dude and The Day the Island Stood Still.
The Kongo Bongo Festival of Lights	TBA	2	4	Includes The Kongo Bongo Festival of Lights and Hooray for Holly-Kongo Bongo.
Speak No Evil, Dude	TBA	2	4	Includes Speak No Evil, Dude and The Day the Island Stood Still.
Monkey Seer, Monkey Do	TBA	2	4	Includes Monkey Seer, Monkey Do and Four Weddings and a Coconut.
Bad Hair Day	June 20, 2005	4	2	Includes Bad Hair Day, Ape Foo Young, Booty and the Beast and Barrel, Barrel... Who's Got the Barrel.
I Spy with My Hairy Eye	June 9, 2008	3	2	Includes I Spy with My Hairy Eye, Baby Kong Blues and The Kongo Bongo Festival of Lights.
Raiders of the Lost Banana	August 3, 2009	5	2	Includes Raiders of the Lost Banana, Barrel, Barrel... Who's Got the Barrel, Kong for a Day, From Zero to Hero and Buried Treasure.
He Came, He Saw, He Kong-quered	August 20, 2013	4	1	Includes Bad Hair Day, Ape Foo Young, Booty and the Beast and Barrel, Barrel... Who's Got the Barrel.
Raiders of the Lost Banana	October 1, 2013	4	1	Includes Raiders of the Lost Banana, Kong for a Day, From Zero to Hero and Buried Treasure.
Kong Fu	January 21, 2014	4	1	Includes Kong Fu, Get a Life, Don't Save One, Cranky's Tickle Tonic and Orangutango.
The Legend of the Crystal Coconut	March 11, 2014	4	1	Includes Legend of the Crystal Coconut, Bluster's Sale Ape-Stravaganza, Klump's Lumps and Speed.
The Complete First Season	May 12, 2015	26	1	Includes all 26 episodes from season 1.
The Complete Second Season	TBA	14	1	Includes all 14 episodes from season 2.

== Legacy ==
The show had a large line of merchandise in Japan, including a manga, playsets, and a collectible card game featuring drawings of characters—some of which never appeared in the series. The card game was later adapted to be based on Donkey Kong 64.

"Pirate's Scorn", a song from the episode "Booty and the Beast", was covered by Scottish heavy metal band Alestorm in their Curse of the Crystal Coconut album, the album artwork of which contains several nods to the Donkey Kong video game franchise. This cover of Pirate's Scorn was also included in DKC: Curse of the Crystal Coconut, an animated fan tribute to the show.

Benedict Campbell, Adrian Truss, Ron Rubin, and Richard Yearwood—the English voices of King K. Rool, General Klump, Kaptain Skurvy, and Donkey Kong, respectively—reprised their roles in DKC: Return to Krocodile Isle, an animated short made by fans of the series.

In the Nintendo Switch version of Donkey Kong Country: Tropical Freeze, Donkey Kong's "Banana Slamma" catchphrase from the television series is used in one of Tawks' lines when visiting Funky's Fly 'n Buy while playing as Funky Kong.
