= List of Donkey Kong Country episodes =

The following is a list of episodes for the cartoon Donkey Kong Country. The series aired from August 15, 1997, to July 7, 2000, on Teletoon, France 2 and KidsCo.

It has been reported that there are two season numbering schemes that exist for the series that conflict with one another. Nelvana themselves have considered the series to not be made as two seasons, but rather they were set up as three cycles (13x13x14). This was used for the iTunes and Tubi streaming service releases, but when the series was officially released on DVD in North America, they were identified as two seasons, the first being made up of 26 episodes produced by MediaLab and the second season being made up of the 14 episodes produced by Hong Guang Animation. The following list presents the episodes in the order they were aired in United States.

== Series overview ==
Season	Episodes	Originally released	
Season	Episodes	First released	Last released
1	26	August 15, 1997	December 29, 1997
2	14	December 2, 1999	July 7, 2000

== Episodes ==
=== Season 1 (1997) ===
No. overall	No. in season	Title	Written by	Original release date	Prod. code
1	1	"I Spy with My Hairy Eye"	Erika Strobel	August 15, 1997	19
Diddy wishes to be invisible and the Crystal Coconut grants his wish. Diddy uses his newfound power to play pranks on everyone and Donkey Kong ends up getting the blame when Diddy frames him. Songs: Doing What I Want (Ya Can't See Me!), Me Like You
2	2	"The Big Chill Out"	Dale Schott	August 16, 1997	24
Donkey Kong and Diddy accidentally create a drink made of coconut water and snow, which turns out to be a great source of money. Songs: On the Road to Success, Over the Hill
3	3	"Bad Hair Day"	Nadine Van der Velde	August 23, 1997	1
King K. Rool finds out that someone can get weak by having its hair cut and creates the Candy Clone robot in order to cut Donkey Kong's hair and remove his strength. Songs: 'Cause I'm Cranky, Candy Clone
4	4	"Raiders of the Lost Banana"	Nadine Van der Velde	August 30, 1997	6
Donkey Kong finds a golden banana inside Inka Dinka Doo's temple and gives it to Candy, but the banana contains a curse that causes havoc for whosoever keeps it and brings bad luck to the island. Songs: The Curse of the Golden Banana, Our Love is Stronger Than a Golden Banana
5	5	"Ape Foo Young"	Nadine Van der Velde	September 9, 1997	2
Cranky creates a youth potion, so he can take care of the Crystal Coconut himself. Donkey Kong accidentally drinks it, making him become a baby ape. Songs: Cranky's Gonna Show Ya, Diddy to the Rescue
6	6	"Booty and the Beast"	Nadine Van der Velde	September 1, 1997	3
Kaptain Skurvy and his crew invade Kongo Bongo Island and keep Donkey Kong and Diddy in their ship and tries to steal the Crystal Coconut. Songs: Pirate's Scorn, I Gotta Eat!
7	7	"Kong for a Day"	Nadine Van der Velde	September 20, 1997	5
When King K. Rool and his cronies framed Donkey Kong for wrongdoing with his friends, it works even better than they expected; Cranky banishes Donkey Kong to the White Mountains and Diddy replaces him to become the future ruler. Songs: I'm Nobody's Hero, Second Banana
8	8	"From Zero to Hero"	Nadine Van der Velde	September 27, 1997	7
After Cranky's exam, Bluster believes he is going to die soon, so he tries to act nicely in order to be remembered well. Songs: Bluster the Benevolent, My Finest Hour
9	9	"Buried Treasure"	Story by : Erika Strobel; Teleplay by : Bob Ardiel	October 4, 1997	8
Donkey Kong, Diddy and Funky find a map and soon, everyone wants to get the implied treasure. They all go on a treasure hunt and fight to get it. Songs: Riches Galore (Let's Go!), All I Want
10	10	"Cranky's Tickle Tonic"	Story by : Erika Strobel; Teleplay by : Nadine Van der Velde	October 11, 1997	9
Cranky tries to stop Eddie the Mean Old Yeti's constant noisy groaning. Meanwhile, Donkey Kong and Diddy follow the runaway Crystal Coconut, that floated out of Cranky's house due to a magic spell. Songs: Mixing Your Cares Away
11	11	"Get a Life, Don't Save One"	Story by : Erika Strobel; Teleplay by : Peter Sauder	October 18, 1997	10
Donkey Kong saves Bluster's life, causing him to think he owes Donkey Kong a favor. He tries to protect Donkey Kong from everything, while Diddy and Funky try to stop him from doing it. Songs: No One's Going to Make a Monkey Out of Me, Listen to Funky
12	12	"The Curse of Kongo Bongo"	Erika Strobel	October 25, 1997	13
Everyone in the island receives a mysterious letter. Donkey Kong and Diddy discovers that Kongo Bongo Island is coming to an end which these letters contain a curse that causes the Crystal Coconut to stop working, and could eventually destroy the island. Songs: Bluebeard Baboon's Curse of the Double Doubloon, Spellbound
13	13	"Orangutango"	Story by : Erika Strobel; Teleplay by : Peter Sauder	November 1, 1997	11
Donkey Kong and Candy train to compete in a dance contest against King K. Rool and Krusha. Because Donkey Kong can't dance, he wants some help from Funky. Songs: Anyone Can Dance (with reprise)
14	14	"Speed"	Nadine Van der Velde	November 8, 1997	14
Krusha gets highly intelligent after being run over by a minecart and turns into the leader of the Kremlings. When Diddy and Dixie are trapped in a runaway mine cart with no brakes, it's up to Donkey Kong and Candy to rescue them. Songs: I Like Evil, Why'd I Have to Fall for a Hero?
15	15	"Klump's Lumps"	Nadine Van der Velde	November 15, 1997	15
After General Klump fails again, King K. Rool fires him. He befriends Dixie and goes to live with the Kongs, who are suspicious that he is trying to steal the Crystal Coconut. Songs: Haven't Got a Friend in the World, Is There Someone...?
16	16	"Bluster's Sale Ape-Stravaganza"	Erika Strobel	November 15, 1997	16
Bluster is making a TV commercial and Candy calls Cranky to be in it, but Donkey Kong accidentally gives him a sleeping tonic, preventing him from doing the commercial. Songs: Look Out, World ('Cause Here I Come!), Just Remember Who You Are
17	17	"Kong Fu"	Nadine Van der Velde	November 22, 1997	18
Donkey Kong prepares to fight Kong Fu, who is a professional kung fu fighter, and challenges him to a contest. Songs: I'm the Kong Fu Master, Don't Lose Heart
18	18	"Bug a Boogie"	Erika Strobel	November 29, 1997	20
Cranky sends Donkey Kong and Diddy to the Forbidden Forest as punishment for the practical joke, but both King K. Rool and Kaptain Skurvy plan to get the Crystal Coconut while they are out. Songs: The Booty Boogie, The Big Bog Monster
19	19	"Watch the Skies"	Dale Schott	November 29, 1997	21
Donkey Kong and Diddy try to discover Inka Dinka Doo's origins, without success. Funky and they see a UFO and believe that there are aliens on the island. Meanwhile, the others prepare a surprise party for Diddy. Songs: Interplanetary Visitor Dudes, Watch the Skies
20	20	"Baby Kong Blues"	Erika Strobel	December 6, 1997	22
Donkey Kong must take care of his nephew, a baby ape called Baby Kong. Donkey Kong eventually loses him and the baby gets in King K. Rool's hideout. Songs: Look Out, Baby Kong!, My Wittle Evil One
21	21	"To the Moon Baboon"	Erika Strobel	December 6, 1997	25
Donkey Kong thinks of making a time capsule full of the islanders' items to the Moon. Everyone likes the idea and Bluster gets in charge of it. Meanwhile, Donkey Kong can't think of something important to put in it. Songs: What Do You Love the Most?, The Island of Kongo Bongo
22	22	"Double Date Trouble"	Story by : Erika Strobel; Teleplay by : Bob Ardiel	December 1, 1997	12
Donkey Kong tries have lunch with Candy on her day off and watch a movie with Diddy at the same time. He also has to get Bluster to replace some of the booby traps around the Crystal Coconut. Songs: That's Why He'd Rather Be With Me, Holograms
23	23	"Ape-Nesia"	Ian James Corlett	December 1, 1997	23
Donkey Kong has lost his memory after falling and hitting his head. Kaptain Skurvy takes advantage of it and tells Donkey Kong that he is his first mate. Later, K. Rool does the same. Songs: The Mirror Never Lies, One of Us
24	24	"A Thin Line Between Love & Ape"	Ian James Corlett	December 20, 1997	26
Bluster creates a love potion to make Candy fall in love with him, but King K. Rool steals the potion and uses it to make Candy and Donkey Kong do everything for him. Songs: Being Together Forever, I've Got It All!
25	25	"Barrel, Barrel... Who's Got the Barrel"	Nadine Van der Velde	December 28, 1997	4
Bluster tries to impress Candy by getting a ridiculous toupee, but when that doesn't work, he tries to steal the Crystal Coconut. Meanwhile, King K. Rool tries to build a spy satellite. Songs: Creeping, Have We Got a Deal?
26	26	"Legend of the Crystal Coconut"	Erika Strobel	December 29, 1997	17
Donkey Kong tries to know the Crystal Coconut's secrets and ends up giving it to the Kremlings. He must rescue it from both them and Skurvy's crew. Songs: Tell Me Everything, Gotta Get it Back

=== Season 2 (1999–2000) ===
No. overall	No. in season	Title	Written by	Original release date	Prod. code
27	1	"The Kongo Bongo Festival of Lights"	Erika Strobel	December 2, 1999	28
It's the Festival of Lights on the island and everyone goes to spend the holiday with their families, but General Klump is the only one who has no family to spend the day with. Meanwhile, Donkey Kong tries to find his friends good presents and Kaptain Skurvy's crew invade the island to steal the Crystal Coconut and the presents. Songs: No Family Tree, Just Remember Me
28	2	"Hooray for Holly-Kongo Bongo"	Terry Saltsman	January 7, 2000	27
Bluster thinks of an idea to make a movie and invites some of the islanders to be on it. Donkey Kong gets the villain role and, due to that, King K. Rool and his cronies frames Donkey Kong for stealing the Crystal Coconut and the gang thinks that he stole it when it disappears. Songs: I'm Gonna Be a Star!, Be Bad!
29	3	"Speak No Evil, Dude"	Erika Strobel	January 12, 2000	29
Cranky is vaccinating everyone in the island to prevent a disease called "Kongo Bongo Gone Wrongo", but Diddy is reluctant to be vaccinated and fools Cranky. He gets the disease and affects Krusha, who affects King K. Rool. Donkey Kong looks for a Tin Banana Tu to cure Diddy. Songs: Kongo Bongo Gone Wrongo Disease, Charades
30	4	"The Day the Island Stood Still"	Ian James Corlett	January 19, 2000	30
Donkey Kong and Diddy are guarding the Crystal Coconut, and they eventually get tired. Donkey Kong wishes he could sleep forever, and the Crystal Coconut grants his wish, causing all of time to stop. Candy, Diddy and Cranky try to wake Donkey Kong while King K. Rool, Klump and Krusha try to take advantage of their situation and steal the Coconut. Songs: Feel the Power, Wake Up!
31	5	"Message in a Bottle Show"	Terry Saltsman	January 21, 2000	40
While Donkey Kong and Diddy are fishing, Donkey Kong finds a bottle with a message in it. Donkey Kong believes it is for him and says he is the "Future Ruler of Future Rulers Federation" and must leave the island for five years. The gang discover it and prepare a party for Donkey Kong, where each one tells the moments they were together.
32	6	"Monkey Seer, Monkey Do"	Erika Strobel	January 1, 2000	31
Donkey Kong and Diddy are at Funky's place, where they find a lamp. Funky tells them that the lamp can predict the future, but Donkey Kong doesn't believe it. The predictions happen that Klump and Krusha steals the lamp for K. Rool in order to know his future. Songs: Mystic Oracle Summoning Chant (with six variations and a reprisal of the first one)
33	7	"Four Weddings and a Coconut"	Terry Saltsman	March 1, 2000	32
Candy asks Donkey Kong if he would marry her, while making a bet with Bluster. Donkey Kong accepts to make Candy happy, but he must ask Inka Dinka Doo's permission to do it. Once he arrives in the temple, he gets trapped inside. Songs: Yes Means No, The Banana Do-si-do
34	8	"Vote of Kong-Fidence"	Terry Saltsman	April 7, 2000	34
The Kremlings and the Kongs make an election campaign and try to get votes from everyone on the island. Meanwhile, King K. Rool plans to steal the Crystal Coconut while Cranky's out of his cabin. Songs: Vote for Me, Donkey Kong the Politician
35	9	"Follow That Coconut"	Caroline Commisso	April 14, 2000	33
It's one day before the annual soccer game with the Kremlings and the Kongs. The ball used in the game is similar to the Crystal Coconut, which causes Donkey Kong to lose it. Songs: Do You Know What This Means?, The Diddy Drop Rap
36	10	"The Big Switch-A-Roo"	Danial Campbell	May 5, 2000	35
After Cranky invents brain switching helmets, King K. Rool plans to get more powerful by letting the Crystal Coconut's power in his brain. Donkey Kong accidentally switches brains with Cranky's new robot (which he made for Bluster). Later, General Klump also switches brains with Candy. Songs: Metal Head, Head Games
37	11	"Hunka Hunka Burnin' Bluster"	Bruce Robb	June 2, 2000	36
Bluster finds out that he is losing hair and mixes lots of hair tonics to solve this. The formula he accidentally uses turns him into a tough and smooth monkey, by whom Candy falls in love, making Donkey Kong jealous. Songs: I'm Leo Luster, Baby, I'm Back!
38	12	"Best of Enemies"	Simon Racioppa and Richard Elliott	June 9, 2000	37
Donkey Kong and Diddy find a photo showing Cranky and King K. Rool as friends and plan to make them like each other, but their friendship causes trouble in the island and Donkey Kong and Diddy join General Klump and Krusha to make Cranky and King K. Rool be enemies again. Songs: We'll Always Be Friends, This Friendship is Wrong
39	13	"It's a Wonderful Life"	Terry Saltsman	June 16, 2000	38
Donkey Kong causes some trouble for his friends and runs away from Kongo Bongo, since he thinks they are better without him. He hits his head on a tree and sleeps, dreaming of how the island would be if he had never existed, and finds that without him, Diddy has become an evil tyrant with Cranky and Funky as his minions, Bluster has easily won Candy's heart, and King K. Rool is destined to rule the island with a paper mâché lilypad. Songs: If I Wasn't Around, Let Me Go Back to My Home
40	14	"Just Kidding"	Bruce Robb	July 7, 2000	39
It's All Fools Day and Cranky plays pranks on Donkey Kong, Diddy and Candy. They plan a big prank involving the Crystal Coconut to fool him and Donkey Kong disguises as a fake King K. Rool to steal it, but then Candy mistook him and accidentally gives the Crystal Coconut to a real King K. Rool. Songs: Can You Ever Forgive Me?, The Coconut is Cursed!
