= Back Through Time =

Studio album by Alestorm
- Released: 3 June 2011
- Recorded: January–March 2011
- Studios: LSD Studios, Lübeck, Germany
- Genres: Power metal; heavy metal; folk metal; pirate metal; thrash metal
- Length: 40:07
- Label: Napalm
- Producer: Lasse Lammert

Alestorm chronology
Black Sails at Midnight (2009)	Back Through Time (2011)	Sunset on the Golden Age (2014)

Professional ratings
Review scores
Source	Rating
About.com	3/5 stars
AllMusic	4/5 stars
Dangerdog Music Reviews	3.5/5 stars
EspyRock	6/10 stars
Hardrock Haven	7.5/10 stars
Jukebox Metal	2/5 stars
Metal Review	(8.3/10)
Reflections of Darkness	8.5/10 stars
Revolver	3/5 stars
Rock Sound	7/10 stars

Back Through Time is the third studio album by Scottish heavy metal band Alestorm. It was released on 3 June 2011 by Napalm Records and is the first Alestorm recording to feature Gareth Murdock on bass and Peter Alcorn on drums. The album is available in jewelcase, digipack, LP and special edition boxset formats which includes two bonus cover songs. Alestorm did a Back Through Time World Tour starting in Australia and New Zealand. The album reached number 42 on the German albums chart.

== Track listing ==
No.	Title	Lyrics	Music	Length
1.	"Back Through Time"	Christopher Bowes	Christopher Bowes	5:03
2.	"Shipwrecked"	Christopher Bowes	Christopher Bowes	3:31
3.	"The Sunk'n Norwegian"	Christopher Bowes	Christopher Bowes	4:07
4.	"Midget Saw"	Christopher Bowes & Alan Carr	Christopher Bowes & Peter Alcorn	3:18
5.	"Buckfast Powersmash"	Christopher Bowes & Tim Shaw	Christopher Bowes	2:33
6.	"Scraping the Barrel"	Christopher Bowes	Christopher Bowes	4:40
7.	"Rum"	Christopher Bowes	Christopher Bowes	3:29
8.	"Swashbuckled"	Christopher Bowes	Christopher Bowes	3:53
9.	"Rumpelkombo"	Chris Boltendahl	Christopher Bowes	0:07
10.	"Barrett's Privateers" (Stan Rogers cover)	Stan Rogers	Stan Rogers	4:41
11.	"Death Throes of the Terrorsquid"	Christopher Bowes	Christopher Bowes	7:45
Total length:				40:07

LTD edition bonus tracks
No.	Title	Lyrics	Music	Length
12.	"I Am a Cider Drinker" (The Wurzels cover)	Tommy Banner, Pete Budd	Johannes Bouwens	2:58
13.	"You Are a Pirate" (LazyTown cover)	Mark Valenti, Ken Pontac	Mark Valenti, Ken Pontac	1:33
Total length:				44:38

== Personnel ==
- Christopher Bowes – lead vocals, keyboards
- Dani Evans – guitars, backing vocals
- Gareth Murdock – bass, backing vocals
- Peter Alcorn – drums

With:

- Lord Jaldaboath – narration (track 1)
- Ken Sorceron (Abigail Williams) – co-lead vocals (track 11)
- Lasse Lammert – guitar solo (track 6), vibraslap
- Heri Joensen (Týr) – guitar solo (track 10)
- Chris Jones – accordion
- Maria Odvody – violin
- Tobias Hain – trumpet
- Florian Frambach – trumpet
- Derek Fobaire – trombone
- Hans-Jørgen Martinus Hansen (Svartsot) – whistles
- Brenden Casey – backing vocals
- Gordon Krei – orchestral arrangements, programming

== Charts ==
Chart (2011)	Peak position
German Albums (Offizielle Top 100)	42
UK Independent Albums (Official Charts)	29
UK Rock & Metal Albums (Official Charts)	12
US Heatseekers Albums (Billboard	23
