= Sunset on the Golden Age =

Studio album by Alestorm
- Released: 1 August 2014
- Recorded: 4 February to 26 February 2014 at LSD Studios in Lübeck, Germany
- Genre: Power metal; folk metal; pirate metal
- Length: 48:39 (CD1)
- Label: Napalm
- Producer: Lasse Lammert

Alestorm chronology
Back Through Time (2011)	Sunset on the Golden Age (2014)	No Grave But the Sea (2017)

Singles from Sunset on the Golden Age
- 1. "Drink" Released: 12 June 2014

Professional ratings
Review scores
Source	Rating
About.com	3.5/5 stars
Sputnik Music	3.5/5 stars

Sunset on the Golden Age is the fourth studio album by Scottish heavy metal band Alestorm. It was released on 1 August 2014 by Napalm Records. It is the band's first album to feature new permanent band member, Elliot Vernon, on keyboards and the last one to feature guitarist Dani Evans before his departure in 2015.

== Track listing ==
No.	Title	Lyrics	Music	Length
1.	"Walk the Plank"	Christopher Bowes, Elliot Vernon	Bowes	4:07
2.	"Drink"	Bowes	Bowes	3:23
3.	"Magnetic North"	Bowes	Bowes	3:47
4.	"1741 (The Battle of Cartagena)"	Bowes	Bowes	7:18
5.	"Mead from Hell"	Bowes	Bowes	3:41
6.	"Surf Squid Warfare"	Bowes	Bowes, Dani Evans	3:59
7.	"Quest for Ships"	Vernon	Bowes, Vernon	4:34
8.	"Wooden Leg!"	Bowes	Bowes, Gareth Murdock	2:45
9.	"Hangover" (Taio Cruz cover)	Taio Cruz, Tramar Dillard, Lukasz Gottwald, Henry Walter	Cruz, Dillard, Gottwald, Walter	3:41
10.	"Sunset on the Golden Age"	Bowes	Bowes, Peter Alcorn	11:26
Total length:				48:39

Japanese edition bonus tracks
No.	Title	Length
11.	"Oceans of Treasure" (Rumahoy cover)	4:57
12.	"Rumpelkombo (Part III)"	0:06
Total length:		53:42

Rumplugged (Limited Digipak Edition bonus disc)
No.	Title	Length
1.	"Over the Seas" (acoustic version)	4:03
2.	"Nancy the Tavern Wench" (acoustic version)	4:52
3.	"Keelhauled" (acoustic version)	3:58
4.	"The Sunk'n Norwegian" (acoustic)	4:06
5.	"Shipwrecked" (acoustic version)	3:31
6.	"Questing Upon the Poop Deck" (Bonus Track)	3:12
Total length:		23:45

== Personnel ==
Alestorm

- Christopher Bowes - lead vocals, keytar
- Dani Evans - guitars
- Gareth Murdock - bass
- Peter Alcorn - drums
- Elliot Vernon - keyboards, unclean vocals

Additional

- Hildegard Niebuhr - violin
- Tobias Hain - trumpet
- Jonas Dieckmann - trumpet
- Gordon Krei - programming
- Myk Barber (Prostitute Disfigurement) - guitar solo on "Walk the Plank"
- Lasse Lammert - guitar solo & vibraslap on "Mead from Hell"
- Luke Philp (Lagerstein) - lead vocals on "Hangover"
- Bren Casey - backing vocals

Production

- Lasse Lammert - producer, mixing, mastering
- Ingo Römling - artwork, layout

== Charts ==
Chart (2014)	Peak position
Austrian Albums (Ö3 Austria)	39
Belgian Albums (Ultratop Flanders)	109
Belgian Albums (Ultratop Wallonia)	186
German Albums (Offizielle Top 100)	26
Scottish Albums (OCC)	63
Swiss Albums (Schweizer Hitparade)	58
UK Albums (OCC)	68
UK Independent Albums (OCC)	7
UK Rock & Metal Albums (OCC)	1
US Heatseekers Albums (Billboard)	7
US Independent Albums (Billboard)	32
US Top Hard Rock Albums (Billboard)	20
