= No Grave but the Sea =

No Grave But the Sea

Studio album by Alestorm
- Released: 26 May 2017
- Genres: Folk metal; power metal; pirate metal
- Length: 45:37
- Label: Napalm
- Producer: Lasse Lammert

Alestorm chronology
| Sunset on the Golden Age (2014) | No Grave But the Sea (2017) | Curse of the Crystal Coconut (2020) |

Singles from No Grave But the Sea
- 1. "Alestorm" Released: 21 April 2017; 2. "Mexico" Released: 5 May 2017

Professional ratings
Review scores
| Source | Rating |
|---|---|
| Blabbermouth.net | 7/10 stars |
| Metal Hammer | 3.5/5 stars |

No Grave But the Sea is the fifth studio album by Scottish heavy metal band Alestorm, released on 26 May 2017. It is the band's first album to feature guitarist Máté Bodor since the departure of Dani Evans in 2015.

== Track listing ==
| No. | Title | Lyrics | Music | Length |
|---|---|---|---|---|
| 1. | "No Grave But the Sea" | Christopher Bowes, Lasse Lammert | Christopher Bowes | 3:30 |
| 2. | "Mexico" | Bowes, Lammert | Bowes | 3:10 |
| 3. | "To the End of the World" | Bowes, Lammert, Elliot Vernon, Máté Bodor | Elliot Vernon, Bowes, Máté Bodor | 6:43 |
| 4. | "Alestorm" | Bowes, Lammert, Vernon | Bowes, Vernon | 3:56 |
| 5. | "Bar ünd Imbiss" | Bowes, Lammert, Bodor | Bowes, Bodor | 4:11 |
| 6. | "Fucked with an Anchor" | Bowes, Lammert, Bodor | Bowes, Bodor | 3:27 |
| 7. | "Pegleg Potion" | Lammert, Vernon | Vernon | 3:54 |
| 8. | "Man the Pumps" | Bowes, Lammert, Vernon | Bowes, Vernon | 5:51 |
| 9. | "Rage of the Pentahook" | Bowes, Lammert, Vernon | Vernon | 3:07 |
| 10. | "Treasure Island" | Bowes, Lammert, Bodor | Bowes, Bodor | 7:48 |
| Total length: | | | | 45:37 |

A bonus disc in limited and digital deluxe edition versions of the album consist of remixes of each track "for Dogs", replacing the vocals with autotuned barking.

== Personnel ==
Credits for No Grave But the Sea adapted from AllMusic

Alestorm

- Christopher Bowes – lead vocals, keytar
- Máté Bodor – guitars
- Gareth Murdock – bass
- Elliot Vernon – keyboards, unclean vocals, tin whistle
- Peter Alcorn – drums

Additional

- Tobias Hain – brass arrangement, trumpet
- Jan Philipp Jacobs – brass arrangement, trombone
- Tobias Waslowski – violin
- Betsy Neal – backing vocals
- Kane Neal – backing vocals
- Chris Short – backing vocals

Production

- Lasse Lammert – producer, mixing, mastering, vibraslap
- Dan Goldsworthy – artwork, layout
- Adam Opris – photography
- Chris Stropoli – drum technician

== Charts ==
| Chart (2017) | Peak position |
|---|---|
| Austrian Albums (Ö3 Austria) | 15 |
| Belgian Albums (Ultratop Flanders) | 19 |
| Belgian Albums (Ultratop Wallonia) | 47 |
| French Albums (SNEP) | 132 |
| German Albums (Offizielle Top 100) | 14 |
| New Zealand Heatseekers Albums (RMNZ) | 10 |
| Scottish Albums (Official Charts) | 27 |
| Swiss Albums (Schweizer Hitparade) | 17 |
| UK Albums (Official Charts) | 50 |
| UK Independent Albums (Official Charts) | 4 |
| UK Rock & Metal Albums (Official Charts) | 1 |
| US Heatseekers Albums (Billboard) | 1 |
| US Independent Albums (Billboard) | 5 |
| US Top Hard Rock Albums (Billboard) | 14 |
| US Indie Store Album Sales (Billboard) | 19 |
