= Captain Morgan's Revenge =

Studio album by Alestorm
- Released: 25 January 2008
- Recorded: Lübeck, Germany, July - October 2007
- Genres: Power metal; folk metal; heavy metal; pirate metal
- Length: 41:31
- Label: Napalm
- Producer: Lasse Lammert

Alestorm chronology
| Captain Morgan's Revenge (2008) | Black Sails at Midnight (2009) |

10th anniversary edition artwork

Professional ratings
Review scores
| Source | Rating |
|---|---|
| About.com | 3.5/5 stars |
| Allmusic | 3.5/5 stars |

Captain Morgan's Revenge is the debut studio album by Scottish heavy metal band Alestorm, released in 2008 by Napalm Records.

Drums were recorded by Migo Wagner, a session drummer, because Ian Wilson could not travel to Germany for the recordings, although he did make minor contributions to the album by recording some additional percussion. "Heavy Metal Pirates" was re-recorded during the same sessions but left off the album and later released as a digital download and on the Leviathan EP.

== Track listing ==
All tracks are written by Christopher Bowes, except where noted.

| No. | Title | Lyrics | Music | Length |
|---|---|---|---|---|
| 1. | "Over the Seas" | | | 3:55 |
| 2. | "Captain Morgan's Revenge" | | | 6:42 |
| 3. | "The Huntmaster" | | | 4:59 |
| 4. | "Nancy the Tavern Wench" | | | 4:52 |
| 5. | "Death Before the Mast" | Joe McQuade | Bowes, Gavin Harper | 3:17 |
| 6. | "Terror on the High Seas" | | Bowes, Harper | 3:51 |
| 7. | "Set Sail and Conquer" | | Bowes, Harper | 4:38 |
| 8. | "Of Treasure" | McQuade | | 2:58 |
| 9. | "Wenches & Mead" | | | 3:42 |
| 10. | "Flower of Scotland" (The Corries cover) | Roy Williamson | Williamson | 2:37 |
| Total length: | | | | 41:31 |

10th Anniversary Edition (Live At Summer Breeze 2015 - Bonus CD)
| No. | Title | Length |
|---|---|---|
| 1. | "Actual Human Intro" | 1:36 |
| 2. | "Walk The Plank" | 4:02 |
| 3. | "The Sunk'n Norwegian" | 4:38 |
| 4. | "Shipwrecked" | 4:13 |
| 5. | "Magnetic North" | 4:35 |
| 6. | "That Famous Ol' Spiced" | 5:32 |
| 7. | "Nancy The Tavern Wench" | 5:27 |
| 8. | "Keelhauled" | 3:52 |
| 9. | "Rumpelkombo" | 1:15 |
| 10. | "Drink" | 4:01 |
| 11. | "Captain Morgan's Revenge" | 7:13 |

== Personnel ==
- Christopher Bowes - vocals, keyboards, tin whistle
- Ian Wilson - percussion
- Dani Evans - bass
- Gavin Harper - guitars, backing vocals, jew's harp, tambourine, additional drums

=== Additional personnel and staff ===
- Lasse Lammert - vibraslap, tambourine, producer, mixing, mastering, engineering
- Brendan Casey - backing vocals, additional bass
- Migo Wagner - drums, backing vocals
- Chris Mummelthey - backing vocals
- Steve Brown - photography
- Ingo Römling - cover art
