= Alestorm =

Scottish pirate-themed heavy metal band

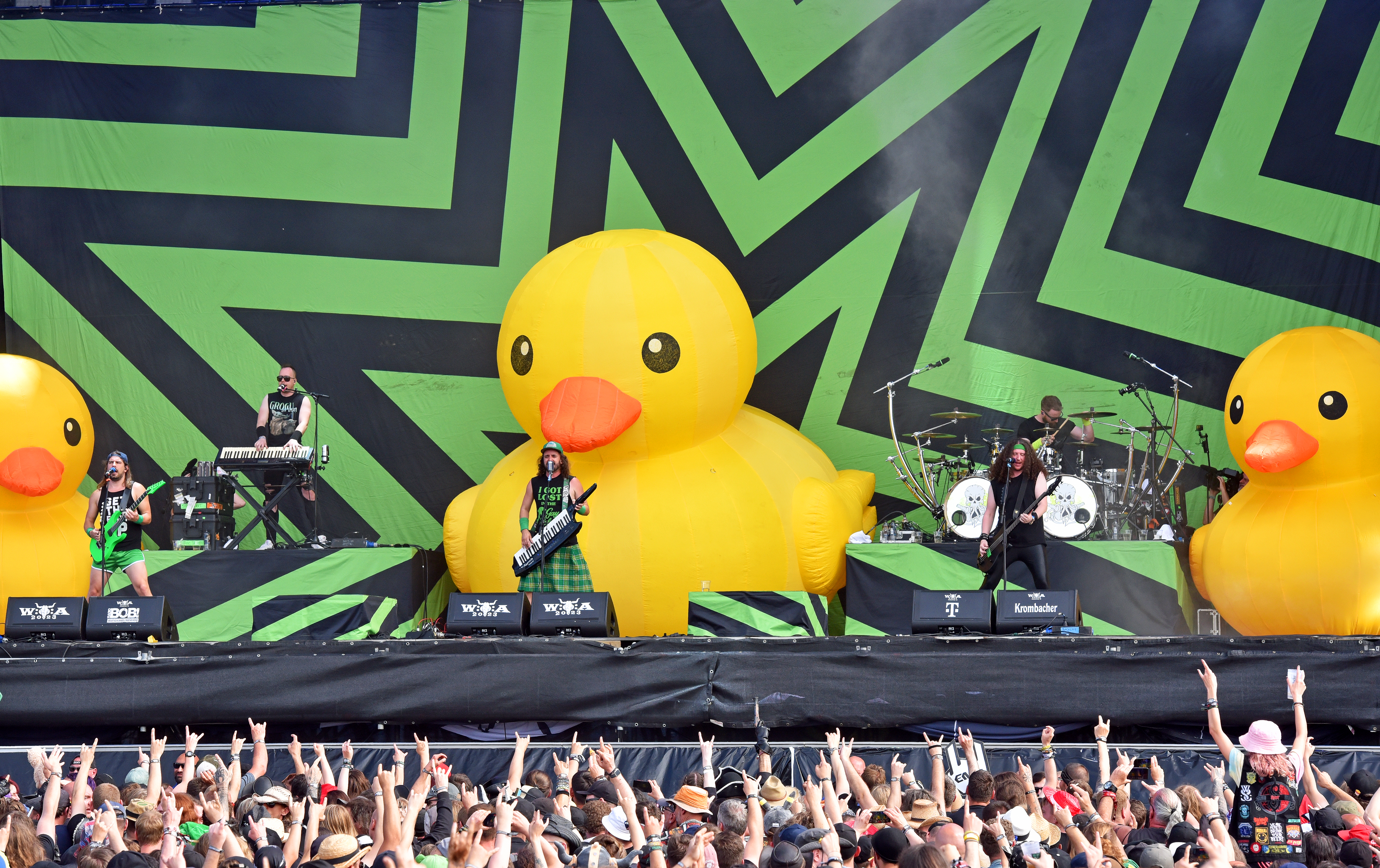
- Alestorm performing in 2023

Background information
- Also known as: Battleheart (2004–2007)
- Origin: Perth, Scotland
- Genres: Pirate metal; folk metal; power metal; heavy metal
- Works: Alestorm discography
- Years active: 2004–present
- Label: Napalm
- Members: Christopher Bowes; Gareth Murdock; Peter Alcorn; Elliot Vernon; Máté Bodor
- Past members: Gavin Harper; Dani Evans; Doug Swierczek; Ian Wilson; Alex Tabisz; Tim Shaw
- Website: alestorm.net

Logo

Alestorm, formerly Battleheart, are a Scottish heavy metal band formed in Perth in 2004. As a result of their pirate theme, critics and fans have been dubbed them a "pirate metal" band. The group currently consists of lead vocalist/keytarist Christopher Bowes, bassist Gareth Murdock, drummer Peter Alcorn, keyboardist/harsh vocalist Elliot Vernon and guitarist Máté "Bobo" Bodor.

They signed to Napalm Records in 2007, and released their debut album, Captain Morgan's Revenge, on 25 January 2008. The band released their second album, Black Sails at Midnight, on 27 May 2009. The band's third album, Back Through Time, was released on 3 June 2011. Their fourth album, Sunset on the Golden Age, was released in August 2014. Fifth album No Grave But the Sea was released on 26 May 2017. Their sixth album, Curse of the Crystal Coconut, was released on 29 May 2020. Their seventh album, Seventh Rum of a Seventh Rum, was released on 24 June 2022. Their eighth album, The Thunderfist Chronicles, was released on 20 June 2025.

The band has released two live albums and six EPs. Lead vocalist Christopher Bowes provides the announcer voice for the Pirate team in the video game Pirates, Vikings and Knights II.

== History ==
=== Battleheart and origins (2004–2007) ===
The band was founded in 2004 in Perth, Scotland as Battleheart, a studio project by Christopher Bowes and Gavin Harper. Originally intended as a standard power metal band, the success of song "Heavy Metal Pirates" convinced the band to permanently adopt a pirate theme and incorporate folk metal elements into their music. Gavin and Christopher recorded and released two demos in 2006, which were received well by the local metal community. The band began to perform live in 2006, with a lineup consisting of Bowes (vocals and keytar), Harper (guitars), Dani Evans (bass) and Doug Swierczek (drums). Doug Swierczek eventually left the band later that year and was replaced by Ian Wilson. After a period of inactivity, in late 2007 Battleheart sent the aforementioned demos to Napalm Records. The band was quickly offered a record deal.

=== Captain Morgan's Revenge (2007–2009) ===
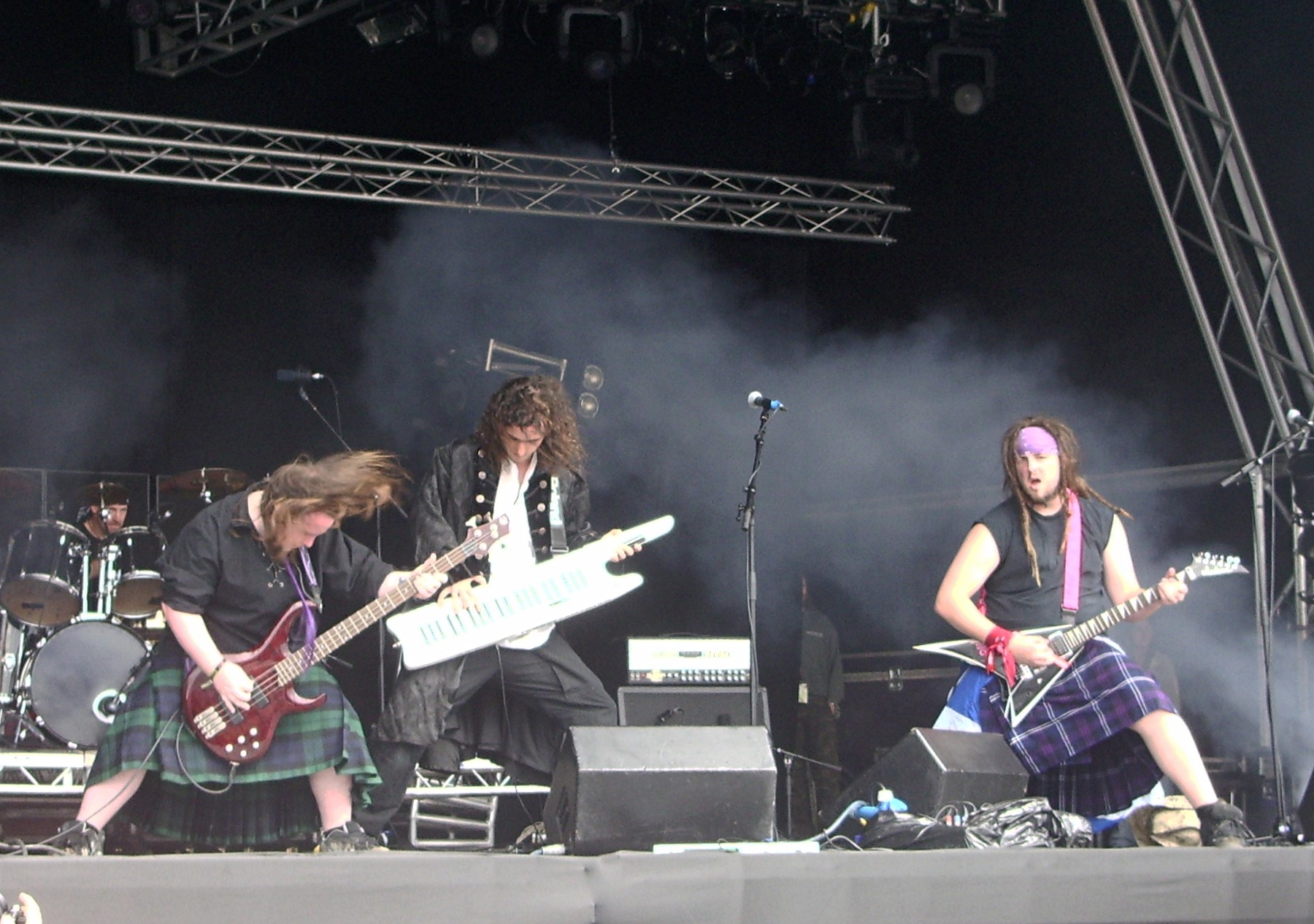
Alestorm performing in 2008

After being signed by Napalm Records, the band changed their name from Battleheart to Alestorm. Their debut studio album, Captain Morgan's Revenge, was released in early 2008. The album featured the drummer of the band Incubator, Migo Wagner as the session drummer. The album was also produced by Incubator guitarist Lasse Lammert.

In April 2008, the band released the single "Heavy Metal Pirates". They also played the UK festival Bloodstock, alongside headliners Nightwish and Dimmu Borgir. Drummer Ian Wilson left in June 2008 and later rejoined in August of the same year. By September 2008, original guitarist Gavin Harper had left the band. Tim Shaw was Harper's replacement, but after a brief period of touring, was fired from the band. To fill the guitarist position, Dani Evans switched instruments from bass to guitar, and Gareth Murdock of Waylander joined as the replacement bassist.

=== Black Sails at Midnight and Back Through Time (2009–2011) ===
The band's second studio album Black Sails at Midnight was released in May 2009. The album peaked at #60 on the GfK Entertainment charts. In March 2010, Ian Wilson left the band and was replaced with a new drummer named Peter Alcorn. Alestorm's third album, Back Through Time, was Alcorn's first appearance on an Alestorm album.

On June 3, 2011 Alestorm went on a Back Through Time World Tour starting in Australia and New Zealand. The album reached #42 on the German Albums Chart. In October 2011, Elliot Vernon joined the band as keyboard player and also performed screamed / death metal vocals.

=== Sunset on the Golden Age and No Grave But the Sea (2012–2019) ===
The band released their fourth record entitled "Sunset on the Golden Age" on 1 August 2014, reaching the #1 position in the UK Rock Chart.

Dani Evans retired from the band in April 2015, and was replaced by Hungarian guitarist Máté Bodor of the band Wisdom, who is also a part of Leander Kills.

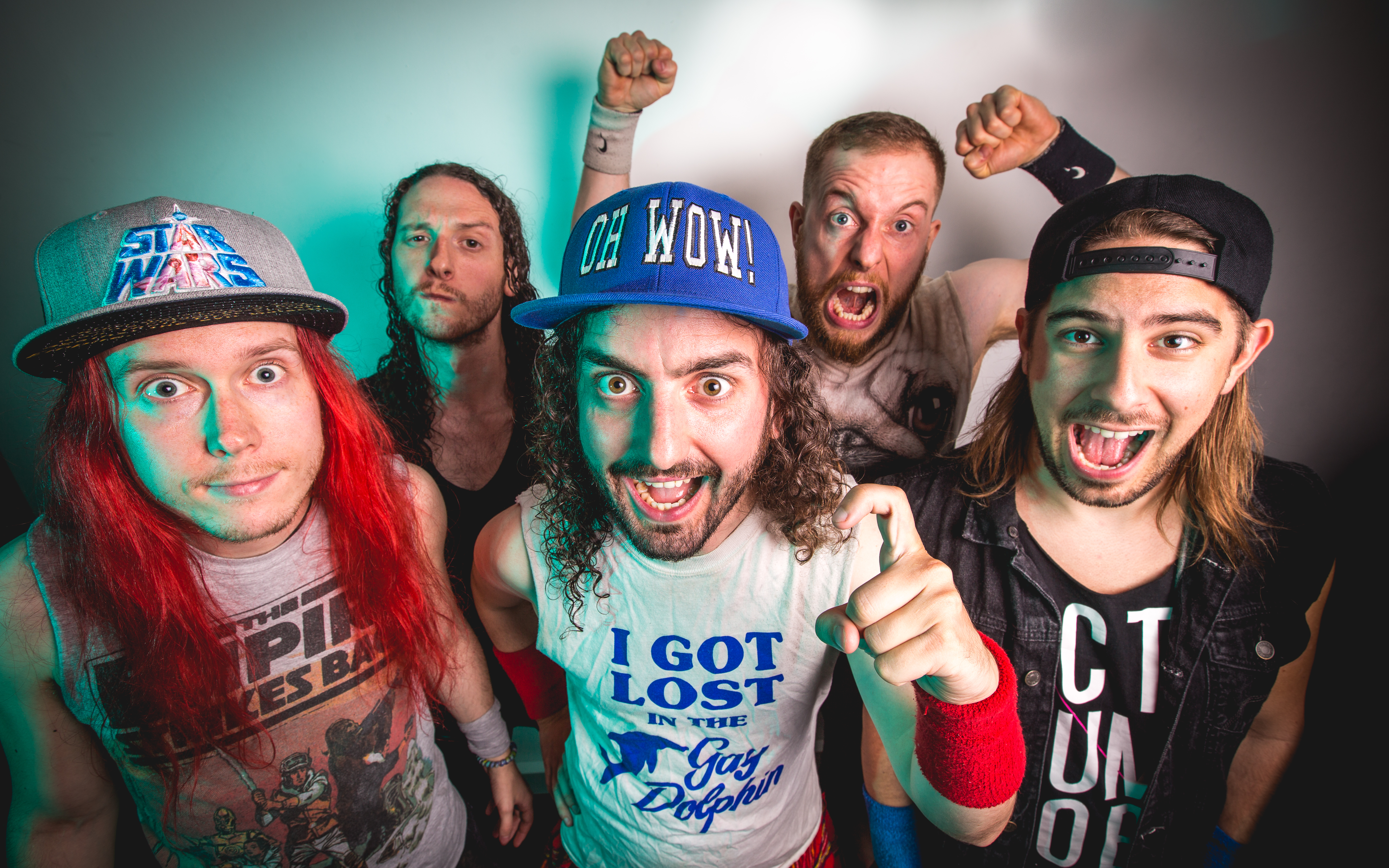
Alestorm in 2017

In October 2016, Christopher Bowes announced during a concert on the Super Smashed Turbo Tour that the band planned to begin recording a fifth studio album in January 2017. The fifth record, entitled "No Grave But the Sea", was released on 26 May 2017. The album peaked at #1 on Billboard's Top Heatseekers Albums chart.

=== Curse of the Crystal Coconut and Seventh Rum of a Seventh Rum (2020–2022) ===
On 8 January 2020, the band announced the title of their sixth studio album, "Curse of the Crystal Coconut". This was released on 29 May 2020. On 30 April, the band released an EP titled, "The Treasure Chest EP". Prior to the album's release, Alestorm released the singles "Treasure Chest Party Quest" on 2 April 2020, "Tortuga" (feat. Captain Yarrface of Rumahoy) on 23 April 2020, and "Fannybaws" on 14 May 2020. The fourth single for the album titled, "Pirate Metal Drinking Crew" was released on 29 May 2020. The album peaked at #68 on the Official Albums Chart. A deluxe version of the album includes the normal track listing, along with what is referred to as "16th Century Version" editions of each track was released. On 6 August, The Wooden Box was released and it included two bonus tracks on a 7-inch Single which are "Big Ship Little Ship" and "Bassline Junkie". On 28 May 2021, the band released their second live album, "Live in Tilburg".

In August 2021, a Twitter account named "GloryhammerC" posted screenshots of what appeared to be an internal chat from 2017 between the members of the band Gloryhammer, of whom vocalist Chris Bowes was a keyboardist and founding member, that showed misogynist and racist humour along with several racial slurs. Bassist Vincent Jackson Jones of Aether Realm, who formerly collaborated with Bowes in the band Wizardthrone, released a statement on 26 August 2021, in which he distanced himself professionally from Bowes and urged Bowes to make his own statement; at the time, none of Gloryhammer's members had made public comments on the issue. Subsequently, Aether Realm, who were due to tour with both bands, were replaced with the Bootyard Bandits. On 5 September 2021, Bowes and the rest of the band released statements, admitting the leaked chat was true and apologizing for the remarks.

On 16 January 2022, the band announced that they entered the studio to record their seventh studio album, Seventh Rum of a Seventh Rum. On 31 January 2022, the band released a music video for the song "Zombies Ate My Pirate Ship", a song from their sixth album, "Curse of the Crystal Coconut". On 13 March 2022, the band announced that their seventh studio album will be released on 24 June 2022. On 6 April 2022, the band released the lead single, "Magellan's Expedition". On 4 May 2022, the band released the second single, "P.A.R.T.Y.". On 1 June 2022, the band released the third single, "The Battle of Cape Fear River. On 22 June 2022, the band released the fourth single, "Seventh Rum of a Seventh Rum".

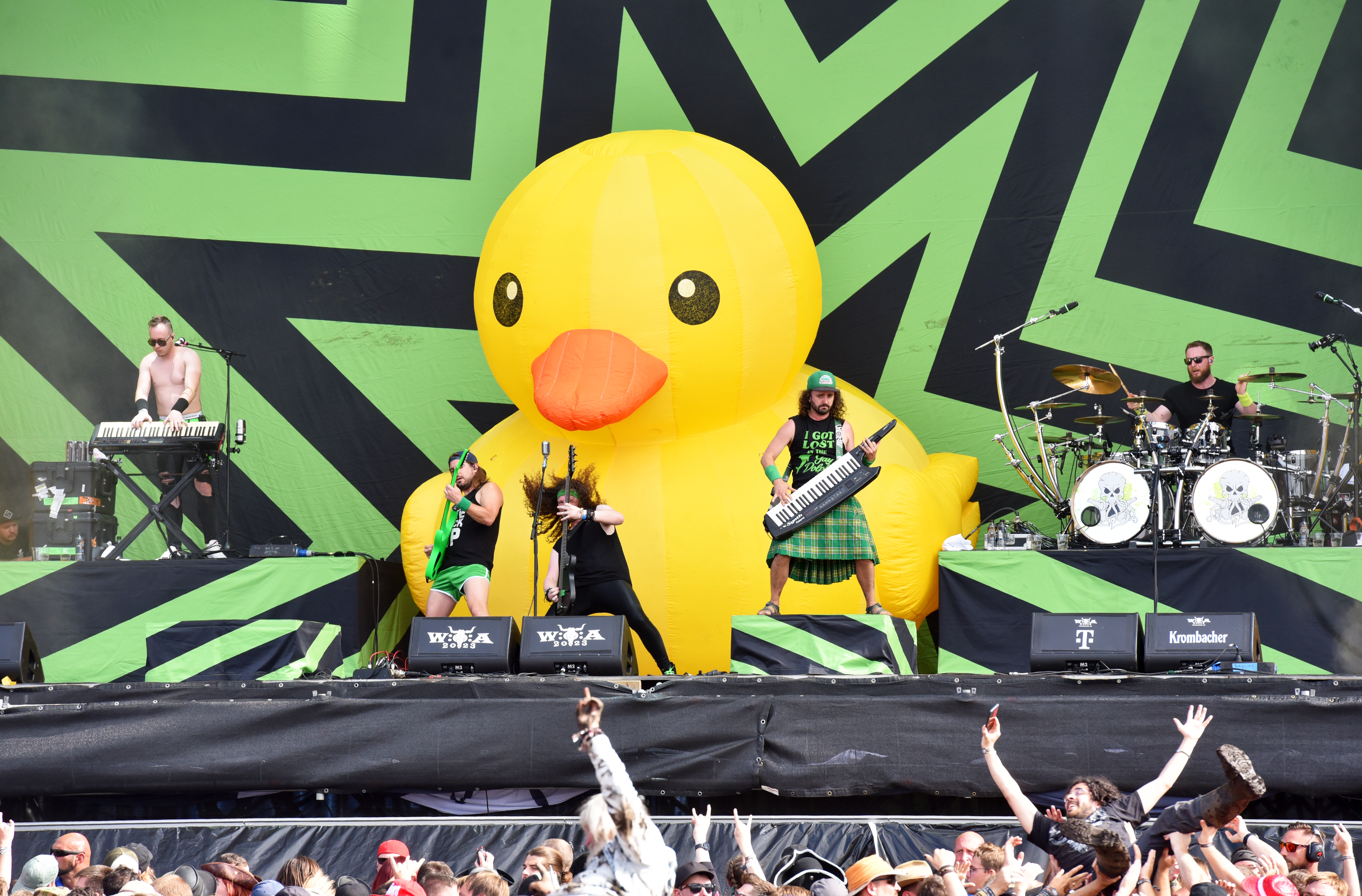
Alestorm on Wacken Open Air 2023

=== Voyage of the Dead Marauder EP and The Thunderfist Chronicles (2023–present) ===
On 17 September 2023, the band announced an upcoming EP titled "Voyage of the Dead Marauder", set to be released in 2024. On 14 November 2023, the band announced the release date for the EP, setting the release for 22 March 2024. On 14 February 2024, the band released a new song, "Voyage of the Dead Marauder", the lead single from the EP. The EP featured two cover versions. On 21 March 2024, the band released a new song, "Uzbekistan", the second single from the EP.

On 4 March 2025, the band announced their eighth studio album, The Thunderfist Chronicles, which was later released on 20 June 2025. On 23 April 2025, the band released the album's first single, "Frozen Piss 2". On 20 May 2025, the album's second single, "Killed to Death by Piracy", was released. On 18 June 2025, the album's third single, "The Storm", was released. On 2 November 2026, the band announced their upcoming ninth studio album, Infinite Seas of Stellar Damnation, set to be released in 2027.

== Musical style ==
Alestorm – Keelhauled
A clip from Keelhauled illustrates Alestorm's style of play.

Alestorm is generally classified as pirate metal, folk metal, power metal and heavy metal. (Note: Musical styles: pirate metal; folk metal; power metal; heavy metal) Alestorm has also included elements of pop, rap metal, nu metal, progressive metal, thrash metal, symphonic metal, death metal, symphonic black metal, metalcore, black metal, extreme metal, and Finnish folk music in their music.

The band refer to themselves as "True Scottish Pirate Metal" and are identifiable by the pirate-themed lyrics in their songs. Alestorm's music utilizes the upbeat epic style of Scottish folk metal and power metal. Album recordings feature heavy use of real trumpets, trombones, accordions synths, fiddle and tin whistle, violins, vibraslaps, brass, keytars, and singalong choruses to convey a pirate sea shanty feel. Alestorm's lyrical themes focus on pirates themes including sailing, pillaging, and drinking.

The band's later albums incorporate screaming and death growls performed by keyboard player Elliot Vernon, as well from guest vocalists such as Ken Sorceron and Mathias Lillmåns.

== Band members ==
Alestorm at Luppolo In Rock 2024

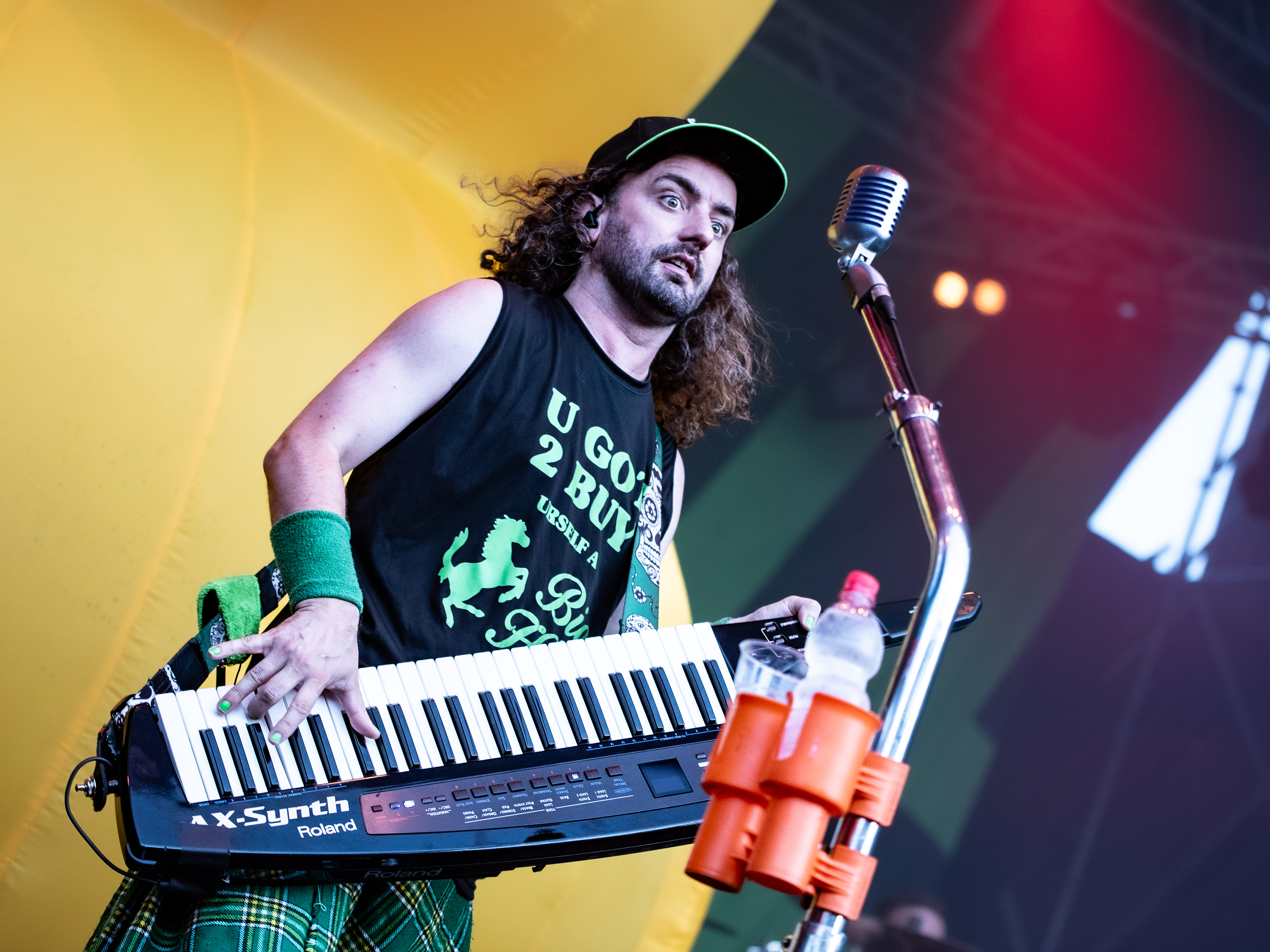
Christopher Bowes

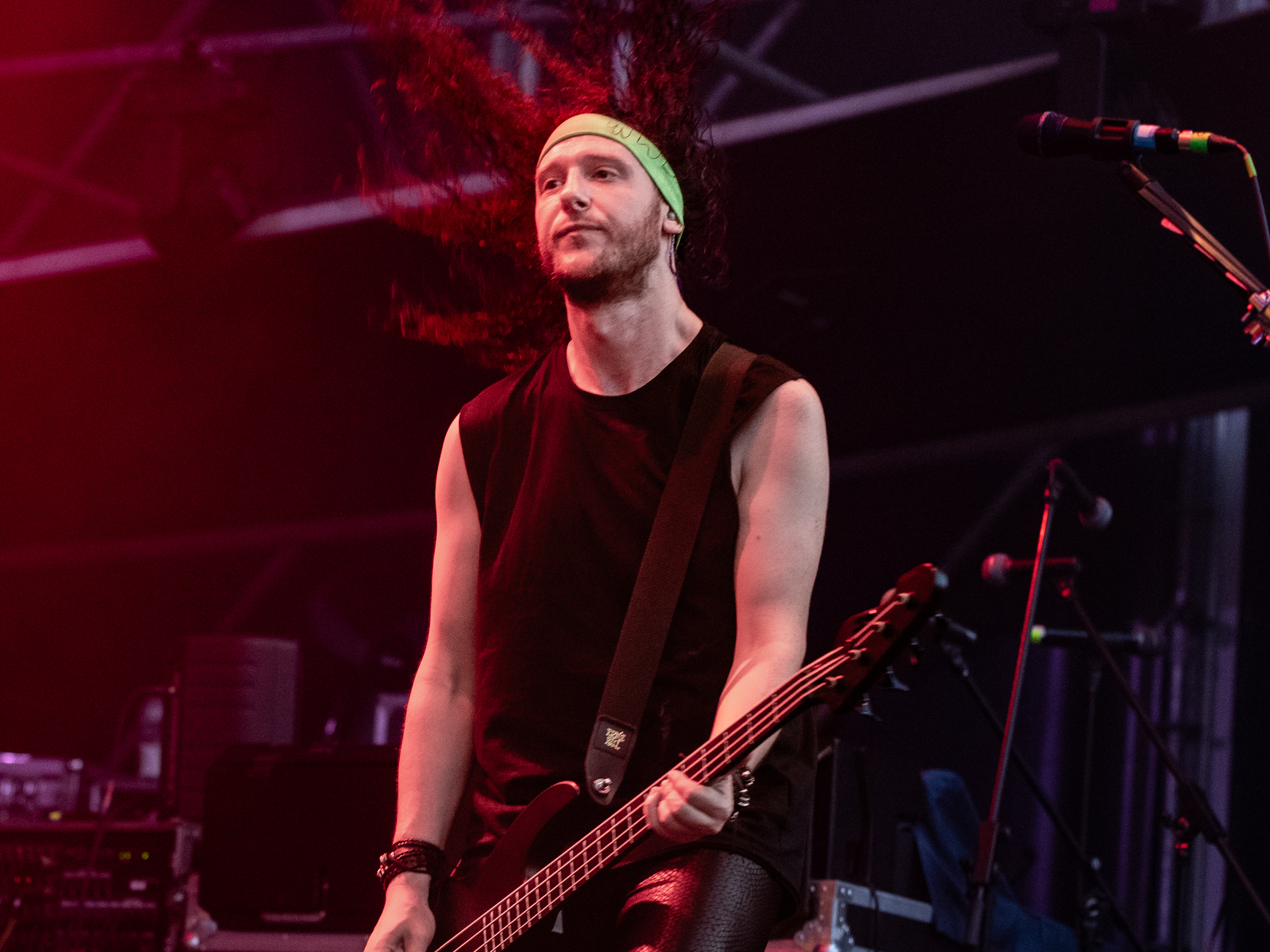
Gareth Murdock

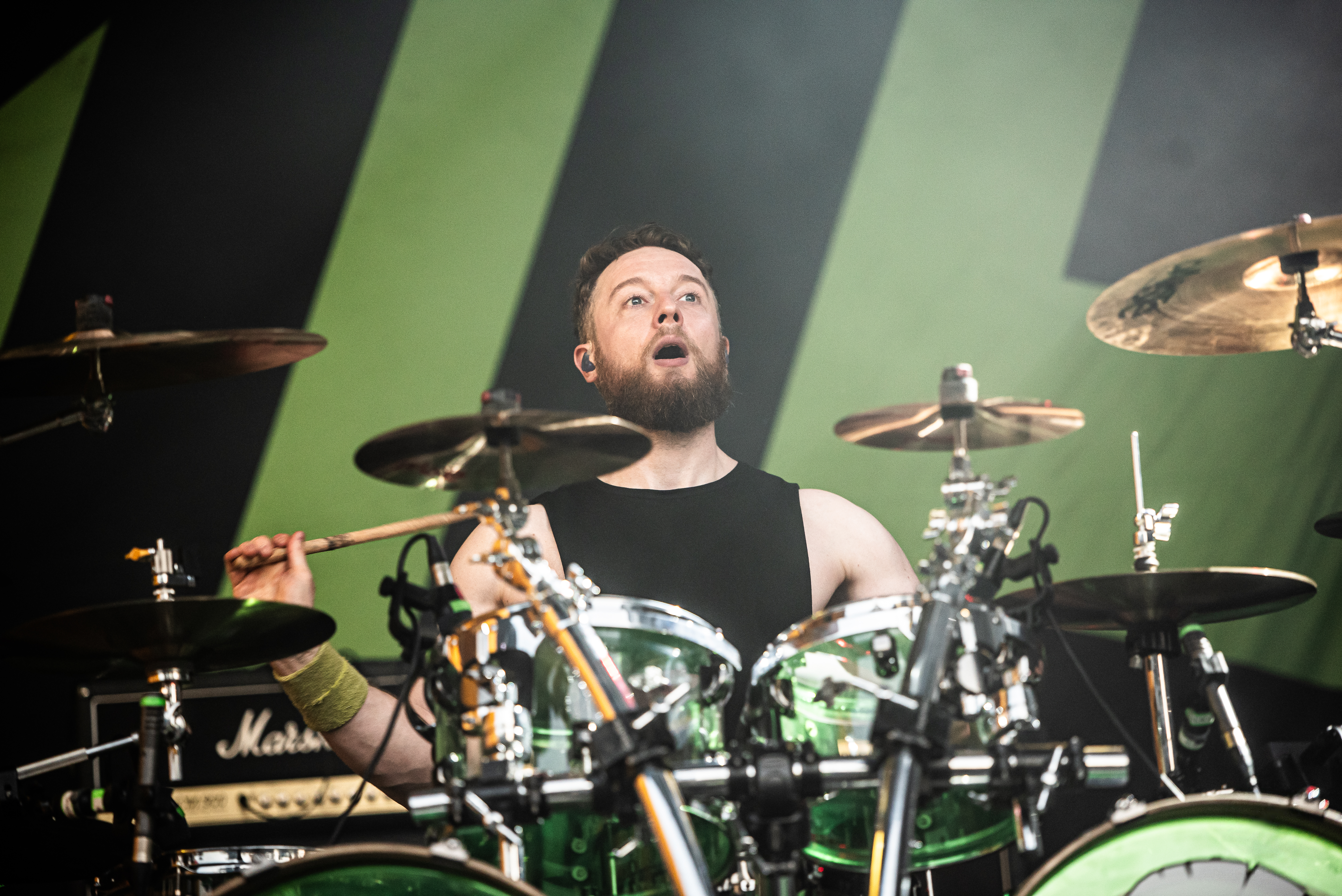
Peter Alcorn

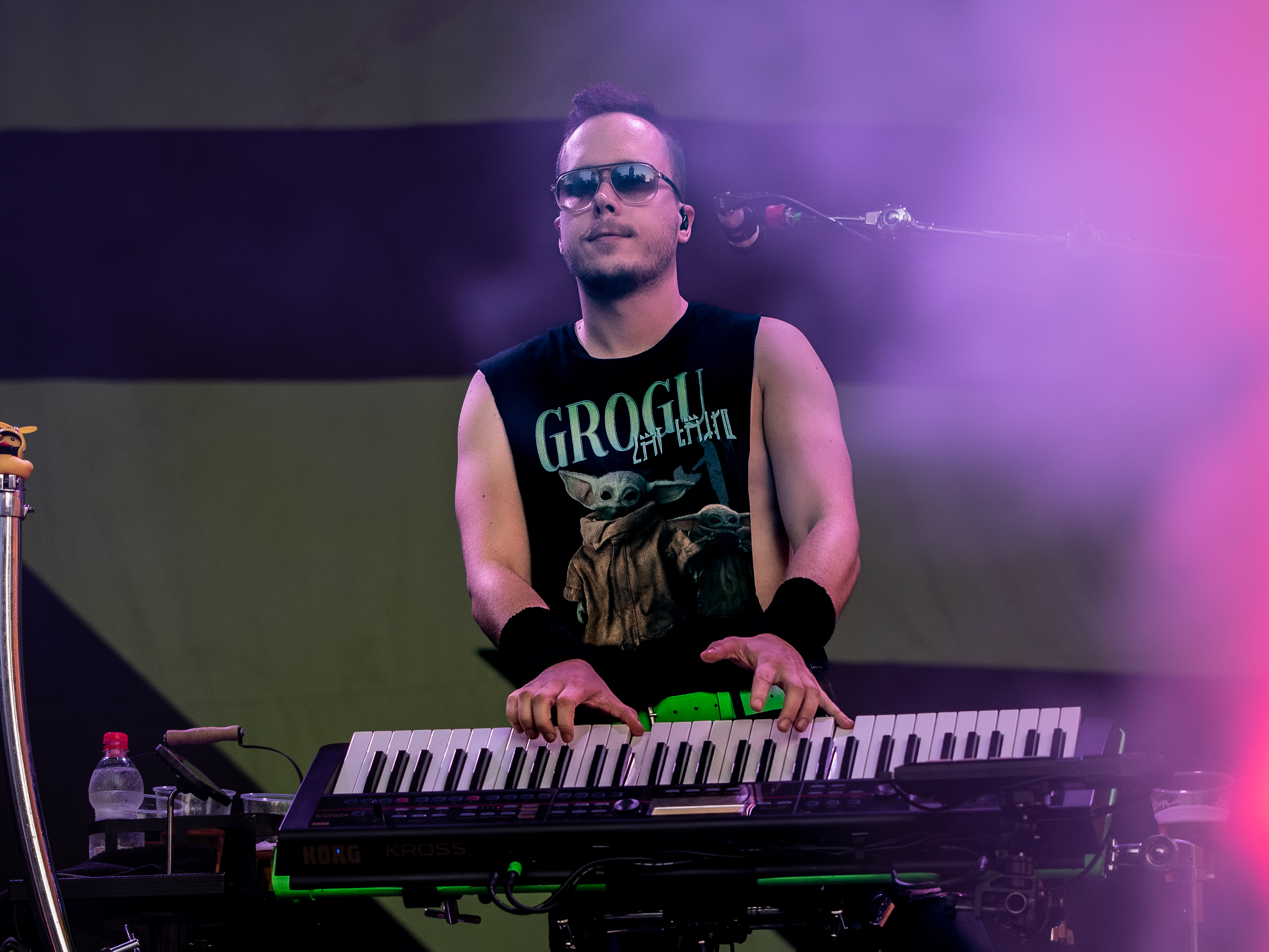
Elliot Vernon

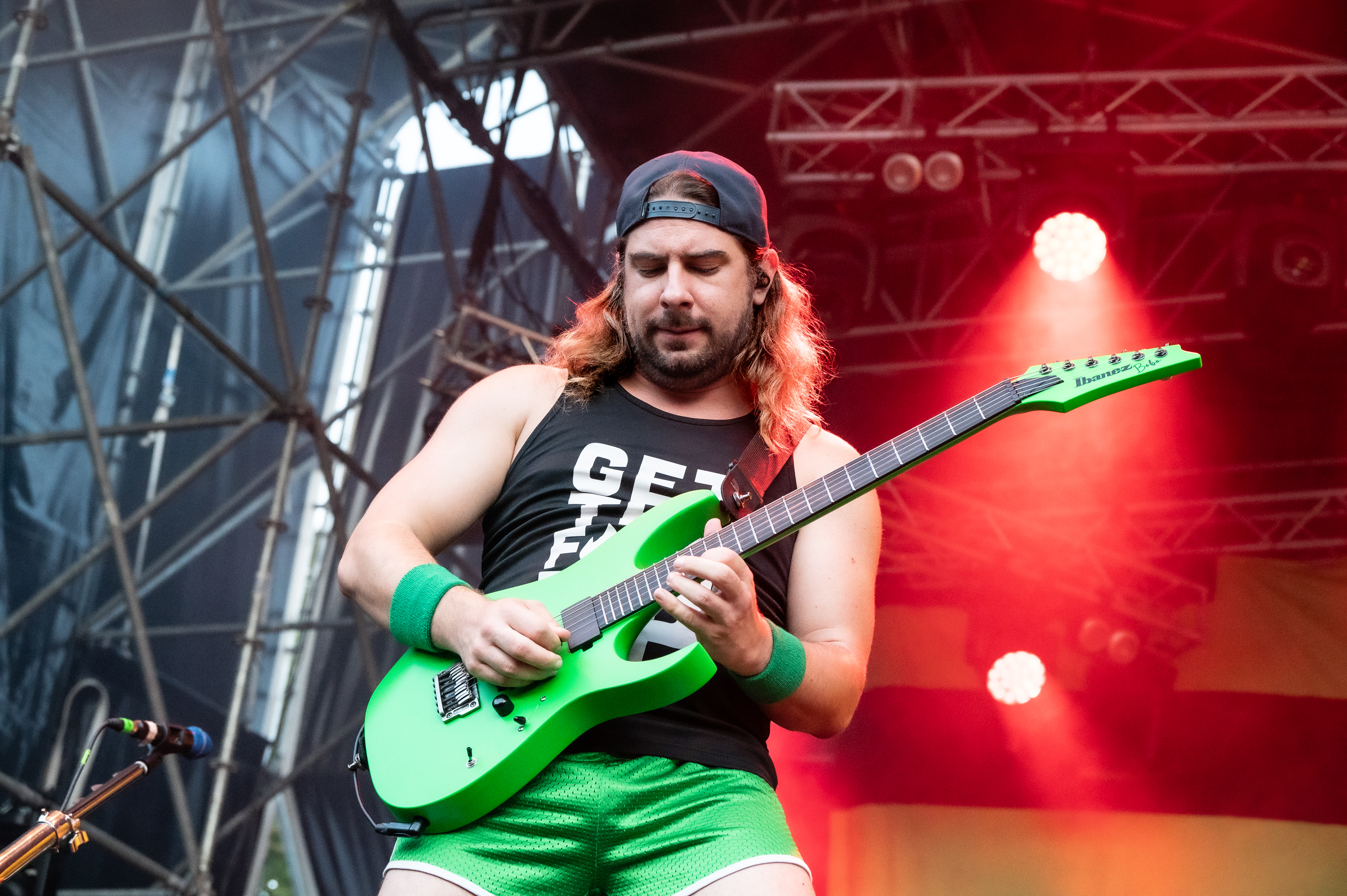
Máté Bodor

Current

- Christopher Bowes – lead vocals, keytar (2004–present), keyboards, tin whistle (2004–2011)
- Gareth Murdock – bass, backing vocals (2008–present)
- Peter Alcorn – drums, percussion (2010–present)
- Elliot Vernon – keyboards, unclean vocals, tin whistle (2011–present)
- Máté Bodor – guitars, backing vocals (2015–present)

Former

- Gavin Harper – guitars, drums, percussion, backing vocals (2004–2008)
- Dani Evans – bass (2006–2008), guitars (2008–2015), backing vocals (2006–2015)
- Doug Swierczek – drums (2006)
- Ian Wilson – drums, percussion, backing vocals (2007–2008, 2008–2010)
- Alex Tabisz – drums (2008)
- Tim Shaw – guitars, backing vocals (2008)

Session

- Tobias Hain – trumpet (2009–present, studio only)
- Heri Joensen – vocals (2009)
- Jan Philipp Jacobs – trombone (2017–2020)
- Gordon Krei – programming, brass and orchestral arrangements (2009–2014)
- Brendan Casey – bass (2008), backing vocals (2008–2014)
- Migo "Oger Mampf" Wagner – drums, backing vocals (2008–2009)
- Chris Mummelthey – backing vocals (2008)
- Bee Bloodpunch – backing vocals (2009)
- Austus Twele – great highland bagpipes (2009)
- Heinrich Gimpel – bass trombone (2009)
- Carsten Petersen – trumpet, cornet (2009)
- Mirjam Beyer – violin (2009)
- Florian Frambach – trumpet (2011)
- Derek Fobaire – trombone (2011)
- Hans-Jørgen Martinus Hansen – whistles (2011)
- Maria Odvody – violin (2011)
- Chris Jones (II) – accordion (2011)
- Hildegard Niebuhr – violin (2014)
- Patty Gurdy – hurdy gurdy, vocals (2020–present, studio and live)
- Ally Storch – violin, viola (2020–present, studio only)

== Discography ==
Studio albums

- Captain Morgan's Revenge (2008)
- Black Sails at Midnight (2009)
- Back Through Time (2011)
- Sunset on the Golden Age (2014)
- No Grave But the Sea (2017)
- Curse of the Crystal Coconut (2020)
- Seventh Rum of a Seventh Rum (2022)
- The Thunderfist Chronicles (2025)
- Infinite Seas of Stellar Damnation (2027)

== Tours ==
- March 2008 – UK Tour supporting Turisas and Norther
- October 2008 – "Ragnarok Aaskereia" European tour with Tyr, Hollenthon, Svartsot and Gwydion
- February – March 2009 – "Pagan Knights" North American tour with Týr and Suidakra
- April – May 2009 – "Black Sails Over Europe" European tour supported by Tyr, Heidevolk and Adorned Brood
- September 2009 – "Paganfest" European tour with Korpiklaani, Moonsorrow, Unleashed, Die Apokalyptischen Reiter, Einherjer, Ex Deo and Swashbuckle
- November 2009 – "Heathenfest" North American tour Eluveitie, Belphegor, Vreid, and Kivimetsan Druidi
- December 2009 - UK tour with Eden's Curse and The Rotted.
- February – March 2010 – "Paganfest" European tour with Finntroll, Eluveitie, Dornenreich, Varg and Arkona
- June 2010 – "Plunder Down Under" Australian Tour supported by Claim the Throne
- August – December 2010 – "World War Tour" European Tour supporting Sabaton
- May 2011 – "Back Through Time" Australian Tour supported by Voyager
- August 2011 – "Pandemonium Over North America" North American tour supporting Kamelot
- September – October 2011 – "Heidenfest" European tour with Turisas, Wintersun, Finntroll, Arkona, and Trollfest
- February 2012 – "Useless Drunken Bastards" UK Tour supported by Claim the Throne and Darkest Era
- April 2012 – "Paganfest" North American tour with Turisas and Arkona
- September 2012 – "The Power Within" UK tour supporting DragonForce with the Defiled
- October 2012 – "The North American Enigma" North American tour with Epica and Insomnium
- January 2013 – "Live at the End of the World" Australia and New Zealand tour
- November – December 2013 – North American tour supported by Trollfest and Gypsyhawk
- September 2014 – "Storming Across Europe" European Tour supported by Brainstorm, Crimson Shadows and Troldhaugen
- October 2014 – "Piratefest" UK tour supported by Lagerstein, Red Rum, and Rainbowdragoneyes
- January 2015 – "Piratefest" North American tour supported by Swashbuckle and the Dread Crew of Oddwood
- November 2015 – "Piratefest" Australia and New Zealand tour supported by Lagerstein and Troldhaugen
- February – March 2016 – "Heroes on Tour" Europe and UK co-headlining tour with Sabaton
- October 2016 – "Super Smashed Turbo Tour" North American tour supported by Nekrogoblikon and Æther Realm
- June – August 2017 – Vans Warped Tour North American tour
- September – October 2017 – "No Grave But the Sea" headline European tour supported by Æther Realm and Troldhaugen
- February 2018 – "Piratefest 2018" UK and Ireland tour supported by Rumahoy and the Dread Crew of Oddwood
- August 2018 - Bloodstock Open Air Festival Saturday main stage
- September 2018 - North American Tour supported by Gloryhammer
- November - December 2018 - "Skälstorm European Tour" supported by Skálmöld
- February 2019 - Australian Tour supported by Rumahoy
- November 2021 - UK and Ireland Tour supported by Gloryhammer and Bootyard Bandits
- June 2022 - Download Festival Sunday Main Stage
- November - December 2023 - Europe tour
- February - March 2024 - Sausage, Bean and Cheesin’ around the UK Tour. Supported by Korpiklaani and Heidevolk
- March - April 2024 - Tour of the Dead Marauder USA and Canada with Elvenking and Glyph
- February - March 2025 - Australian Tour with Nekrogoblikon
