= Dyscord =

Australian metalcore band

- Origin: Perth, Western Australia, Australia
- Genres: Metalcore
- Years active: 2002–2010
- Labels: Prime Cuts / MGM
- Past members: see Members list below

Dyscord were an Australian metalcore band from Perth. In 2006 they released their debut extended play, Arming Within, through independent label Prime Cuts and toured Australia supporting international bands, God Forbid and The Black Dahlia Murder.

In 2008 they released their debut full-length album, Dakota, produced by Adam Spark (of Birds of Tokyo) at Wing Command Studios. Dakota was positively received in critical reviews and was toured nationally both on an independent headlining tour and alongside Tennessee's Whitechapel and Tasmania's Psycroptic.

They have supported international groups, Machine Head, Carcass, Arch Enemy, Trivium, Killswitch Engage, Unearth, As I Lay Dying, the Haunted, Mudvayne, Ill Niño, Static-X, Darkest Hour, as well as Australian bands, Parkway Drive, I Killed the Prom Queen, Double Dragon and Truth Corroded. They released their second album, Tirades, in February 2010 via Stomp Entertainment and followed with a tour into March. Anna Denejkina of VoltageMedia opined, "[it] is without doubt the album that is going to bring [the group] worldwide recognition. With a sound that is all their own, [they] fuse elements of Death Metal, Thrash, Grind and even Melodic metal into one brutal metal melting pot to pull out a sound that is uniquely 'Dyscord'." Soon after the tour, Dyscord disbanded to focus on other projects.

== Members ==
- James Herbert - vocals
- Matthew Herbert - guitars
- Owen Thomas - guitars
- Raffe Houston - bass
- Ashley Large - drums
- Tim Madden - drums
- John Chuah - guitar
- John Blythman - drums
- Ben Hesketh - drums

== Discography ==
=== Albums ===
- Dakota (7 April 2008): – Independent/MGM Distribution (PC020)
- Tirades (9 February 2010): – Stomp Records (STMPCD043)

=== Extended plays ===
- Arming Within (2006): – Independent

=== Compilations ===
- 2007 - A Blaze in the Southern Skies
