= Seventh Rum of a Seventh Rum =

Studio album by Alestorm
- Released: 24 June 2022
- Studio: Middle Farm Studios in Devon, England
- Genre: Pirate metal; power metal; folk metal; symphonic metal
- Length: 42:58
- Label: Napalm
- Producer: Lasse Lammert

Alestorm chronology
Curse of the Crystal Coconut (2020)	Seventh Rum of a Seventh Rum (2022)	The Thunderfist Chronicles (2025)

Singles from Seventh Rum of a Seventh Rum
- 1. "Magellan's Expedition" Released: 6 April 2022; 2. "P.A.R.T.Y." Released: 4 May 2022; 3. "The Battle of Cape Fear River" Released: 1 June 2022; 4. "Seventh Rum of a Seventh Rum" Released: 22 June 2022

Seventh Rum of a Seventh Rum is the seventh studio album by Scottish heavy metal band Alestorm. It was released on 24 June 2022 via Napalm Records. The album title is a reference to Iron Maiden's 1988 album Seventh Son of a Seventh Son. The album was produced by the band's long-time producer Lasse Lammert. It was preceded by four singles: "Magellan's Expedition", "P.A.R.T.Y.", "The Battle of Cape Fear River", and "Seventh Rum of a Seventh Rum".

== Recording ==
The album was recorded with the band's long-time producer Lasse Lammert at Middle Farm Studios in Devon, England. Seventh Rum of a Seventh Rum features some of the same guest musicians from the band's previous album, Curse of the Crystal Coconut.

According to lead vocalist Christopher Bowes:

The whole thing is once again produced by the legendary wizard Lasse Lammert, and there’s guest appearances from all our favorite friends, including Captain Yarrface on vocals, Patty Gurdy on hurdygurdy, Ally Storch on violin, Matt Cockram on egg, and even an entire choir singing in badly translated Latin courtesy of the guys and girls from Hellscore.

== Composition ==
Seventh Rum of a Seventh Rum has been described as pirate metal, power metal, folk metal, and symphonic metal. According to Dom Lawson of Blabbermouth.net, the song "Come to Brazil" is a "snotty, punk-metal two-minuter," and "Cannonball" is obscenity-filled whereas "Wooden Leg (Part III)" "is as sweetly melancholy as it is preposterous." The song "Under Blackened Banners" starts off with an electronic introduction.

== Release ==
On 16 January 2022, the band announced that they started recording for their seventh studio album, Seventh Rum of a Seventh Rum. On 31 January 2022, the band released a music video for the song "Zombies Ate My Pirate Ship", a song from their sixth album, "Curse of the Crystal Coconut". On 13 March 2022, the band announced that their seventh studio album will be released on 24 June 2022. On 6 April 2022, the band released the lead single, "Magellan's Expedition". On 4 May 2022, the band released the second single, "P.A.R.T.Y.". On 1 June 2022, the band released the third single, "The Battle of Cape Fear River". On 22 June 2022, the band released the fourth single, "Seventh Rum of a Seventh Rum". The album was released on 24 June 2022.

== Reception ==
Professional ratings
Review scores
Source	Rating
Blabbermouth.net	7.5/10
Metal Hammer	0.5/5 stars
Sonic Perspectives	7.8/10

According to Dom Lawson of Blabbermouth.net, "Seventh Rum of a Seventh Rum delivers plenty of the glories expected, with stupidity and sophistication playing equal roles throughout. Drink up, the party's starting again." In a negative review of the album, Dave Everley of Metal Hammer, stated that "Alestorm prove the joke is wearing thin for [their] seventh album..." and "their ‘I’m a pirate!’ shtick was once mildly amusing...but 15 years of cheeseball folk/power metal... and general yo-ho-ho-ing twattery have flogged any vestiges of entertainment out of it."

== Track listing ==
All tracks written by Christopher Bowes and Lasse Lammert except where noted.

Seventh Rum of a Seventh Rum track listing
No.	Title	Writer(s)	Length
1.	"Magellan's Expedition"		4:38
2.	"The Battle of Cape Fear River"	Bowes, Lammert, Michael Barber	3:06
3.	"Cannonball"		3:57
4.	"P.A.R.T.Y."		3:23
5.	"Under Blackened Banners"		4:39
6.	"Magyarország"	Bowes, Máté Bodor, Lammert	3:58
7.	"Seventh Rum of a Seventh Rum"		3:21
8.	"Bite the Hook Hand that Feeds"		4:09
9.	"Return to Tortuga"		3:54
10.	"Come to Brazil"		2:09
11.	"Wooden Leg (Part III)"	Bowes, Gareth Murdock, Lammert	5:44
Total length:			42:58

Each song also has an Acoustic version and “For Dogs” version in the deluxe edition of the album. The Acoustic version was arranged by the band's keyboardist, Elliot Vernon, and the “For Dogs” version has the vocals replaced by MIDI sampled dog barks.

== Personnel ==
Alestorm

- Christopher Bowes – lead vocals, keytar
- Máté Bodor – guitars
- Gareth Murdock – bass
- Elliot Vernon – keyboard, unclean vocals
- Peter Alcorn – drums

Additional

- Captain Yarrface – vocals
- Jamie Burton - backing vocals
- Matt Cockram - egg, backing vocals
- Paul White - backing vocals
- Ally Storch – violins
- Patty Gurdy – hurdy gurdy
- Tobias Hain – trumpets
- Helge Tischler – trombones
- Hellscore Choir – choir vocals

Production

- Lasse Lammert – production, mixing, mastering
- Jamie Burton - assistant egg engineer

== Charts ==
Chart performance for Seventh Rum of a Seventh Rum
Chart (2022)	Peak position
Australian Digital Albums (ARIA)	32
Australian Hitseekers Albums (ARIA)	15
Austrian Albums (Ö3 Austria)	48
Belgian Albums (Ultratop Flanders)	31
Belgian Albums (Ultratop Wallonia)	99
German Albums (Offizielle Top 100)	7
Hungarian Albums (MAHASZ)	1
Scottish Albums (OCC)	31
Swiss Albums (Schweizer Hitparade)	16
UK Album Downloads (OCC)	24
UK Independent Albums (OCC)	7
UK Rock & Metal Albums (OCC)	5

== Certifications ==
Region	Certification	Certified units/sales
Hungary (MAHASZ)	Gold	2,000^{‡}
^{‡} Sales+streaming figures based on certification alone.
