= The Thunderfist Chronicles =

Studio album by Alestorm
- Released: 20 June 2025
- Genres: Power metal; folk metal; pirate metal
- Length: 45:26
- Label: Napalm
- Producer: Lasse Lammert

Alestorm chronology
Seventh Rum of a Seventh Rum (2022)	The Thunderfist Chronicles (2025)	Infinite Seas of Stellar Damnation (2027)

Singles from The Thunderfist Chronicles
- 1. "Frozen Piss 2" Released: 23 April 2025; 2. "Killed to Death by Piracy" Released: 20 May 2025; 3. "The Storm" Released: 18 June 2025

The Thunderfist Chronicles is the eighth studio album by Scottish heavy metal band Alestorm. It was released on 20 June 2025 via Napalm Records. The album is produced by the band's long-time producer Lasse Lammert. The eighth and final song on the album, "Mega-Supreme Treasure of the Eternal Thunderfist", is Alestorm's longest song to date, at over 17 minutes, featuring guest vocals by hurdy-gurdy musician Patty Gurdy and Symphony X vocalist Russell Allen.

== Release ==
On 4 March 2025, the band announced their eighth studio album, The Thunderfist Chronicles, set to be released on 20 June 2025. On 23 April 2025, the band released the album's first single, "Frozen Piss 2". On 20 May 2025, the album's second single, "Killed to Death by Piracy", was released. The album's third single, "The Storm", was released on 18 June 2025.

== Track listing ==
The Thunderfist Chronicles track listing
No.	Title	Length
1.	"Hyperion Omniriff"	5:30
2.	"Killed to Death by Piracy"	3:20
3.	"Banana"	3:44
4.	"Frozen Piss 2"	4:38
5.	"The Storm"	4:23
6.	"Mountains of the Deep"	2:38
7.	"Goblins Ahoy!" (Nekrogoblikon cover)	4:09
8.	"Mega-Supreme Treasure of the Eternal Thunderfist"	17:04
Total length:		45:26

== Personnel ==
Alestorm

- Christopher Bowes – lead vocals, keytar
- Máté Bodor – guitars
- Gareth Murdock – bass
- Elliot Vernon – keyboards, unclean vocals
- Peter Alcorn – drums

Additional

- Patty Gurdy – hurdy gurdy, vocals on track 8
- Russell Allen – vocals on track 8
- Tobias Hain – trumpets
- Helge Tischler – trombones
- Jamie Burton - backing vocals
- Kane Neal - backing vocals
- Jakub Malášek - backing vocals

Production

- Lasse Lammert – production, mixing, mastering
- Jakub Malášek - editing

== Charts ==
Chart performance for The Thunderfist Chronicles
Chart (2025)	Peak position
Austrian Albums (Ö3 Austria)	13
Belgian Albums (Ultratop Flanders)	127
French Rock & Metal Albums (SNEP)	33
German Albums (Offizielle Top 100)	15
Hungarian Albums (MAHASZ)	1
Scottish Albums (Official Charts)	71
Swiss Albums (Schweizer Hitparade)	70
UK Album Downloads (Official Charts)	22
UK Rock & Metal Albums (Official Charts)	5
