= Curse of the Crystal Coconut =

Studio album by Alestorm
- Released: 29 May 2020
- Recorded: 8 January – 18 February 2020
- Studio: Krabi Road (Thailand) (recording); LSD Studios in Lübeck, Germany (mixing and mastering)
- Genre: Pirate metal; power metal; folk metal; heavy metal; hard rock
- Length: 44:02
- Label: Napalm
- Producer: Lasse Lammert

Alestorm chronology
No Grave But the Sea (2017)	Curse of the Crystal Coconut (2020)	Seventh Rum of a Seventh Rum (2022)

Singles from Curse of the Crystal Coconut
- 1. "Treasure Chest Party Quest" Released: 2 April 2020; 2. "Tortuga" Released: 23 April 2020; 3. "Fannybaws" Released: 14 May 2020; 4. "Pirate Metal Drinking Crew" Released: 29 May 2020

Curse of the Crystal Coconut is the sixth studio album by Scottish heavy metal band Alestorm. It was released on 29 May 2020 via Napalm Records. The album was recorded at Krabi Road, Thailand with the band's long-time producer Lasse Lammert. It was preceded by four singles: "Treasure Chest Party Quest", "Tortuga", "Fannybaws" and "Pirate Metal Drinking Crew".

== Background and recording ==
The album was recorded at Krabi Road, Thailand with producer Lasse Lammert in January 2020. The album was mixed and mastered in the LSD Studios in Lübeck, Germany in February 2020. The music videos for the singles were filmed alongside the album in Thailand in January. The band had seventeen shows in the summer that had to be cancelled due to the COVID-19 pandemic.

Speaking with Metal Injection about the lyrics in the album, lead vocalist Christopher Bowes stated:

I think on this album it comes across pretty clearly in a lot of lyrics that we don't care what people think. We know there's loads of people out there who love what we're doing. So if you hate it, we really do not care because we do what we want to do and it's working for us.

== Composition ==
Like previous Alestorm albums, Curse of the Crystal Coconut has been described as pirate metal, power metal, folk metal, heavy metal, and hard rock. In a review of the album, Exclaim! considered "Treasure Chest Party Quest", "Fannybaws" and "Pirate's Scorn" "[to have] some of the hookiest choruses in the band's catalogue." While describing the song "Treasure Chest Party Quest", Outburn stated, "the fact that the song emerges from behind a veil of 80s cock rock with the usual folk metal adjunct and a bellowing metalcore vocal staccato is an indication from the off that Alestorm is flirting with reinvention and doing it as absurdly as imaginable." Outburn also described the song "Wooden Leg Part 2 (The Woodening)" as "an eight minute, multi-faceted take on prog metal storytelling accented by mournful thrash, symphonic blackness à la Bal-Sagoth and even smidges of death metal. They described "Call of the Waves" as "the band's most serious moment of its career". Metal Injection notes thrash-like riffs on the songs "Chomp Chomp" and "Zombies Ate My Pirate Ship". The song "Tortuga" has been described as pop, nu metal, and rap metal because of the rap verse by Captain Yarrface. The song "Pirate's Scorn" is a version of a song that appeared in the Donkey Kong Country animated series, from the episode "Booty and the Beast".

== Release ==
On 8 January 2020, the band announced the title of their sixth studio album, Curse of the Crystal Coconut, to be released in the summer of 2020. The band later announced that the album would be released on 29 May 2020. On 2 April 2020, the band released the first single from the album, "Treasure Chest Party Quest", along with a music video. On 23 April 2020, the band released the second single from the album, "Tortuga" featuring Captain Yarrface, along with a music video. On 30 April 2020, the band released an EP titled The Treasure Chest EP. The EP features two songs that are on this album and three live versions of songs from their previous albums. On 14 May 2020, the band released the third single from the album, "Fannybaws", along with a music video. On 29 May 2020, the band released the fourth single from the album, "Pirate Metal Drinking Crew", along with a music video. The band also did a giveaway for people who preordered the album. With the giveaway, the winner would get an Alestorm-branded Nintendo 64 along with a copy of Donkey Kong 64. On 6 July 2020, the band released an animated music video for the song "Shit Boat (No Fans)". The video was animated by people at RMIT University in Melbourne. A deluxe version of the album includes the normal track listing, along with "16th Century Version" editions of each track. On 6 August, a wooden box edition was released, which includes two bonus tracks on a 7″ single, "Big Ship Little Ship" and "Bassline Junkie". The song "Big Ship Little Ship" got a music video. On 31 January 2022, the band released a music video for the song "Zombies Ate My Pirate Ship".

== Reception ==
Professional ratings
Review scores
Source	Rating
Blabbermouth.net	8/10
Brave Words	8.5/10
Deadpress	3/10 stars
Distorted Sound	8/10
Exclaim!	7/10
Ghost Cult Magazine	5/10
Metal Hammer	3.5/5 stars
Metal Injection	9/10
Metal Storm	8.4/10
Punknews	4/5 stars

Curse of the Crystal Coconut received generally positive reviews from critics. Jason Roche of Blabbermouth.net called the album "another indicator that the secret behind the band's longevity is their stellar knack for never letting the overall themes drown out the catchiness of their song-craft." In a positive review, Alan Faulkner of Distorted Sound stated, "the lyrics may be silly and some of the songs are a bit out there, but that is what Alestorm are about – having fun and enjoying the music."

Manus Hopkins of Exclaim! gave the album a positive review stating, "it's incredible that Alestorm haven't run out of pirate riffs and lyrics about drinking, pillaging and sailing the seas, but this record is packed with all those and even more." Holly Wrigh of Metal Hammer called the album "another gem in the Scots' steadily improving repertoire of jolly, foul-mouthed metal shanties that go far beyond the confines of gimmickry."

Max Morin, writing for Metal Injection, was also positive, calling "[the album] another killer addition to a packed roster and is dying to be played lived." Mike Elfers of Punknews called the album "eleven tracks of their signature pirate metal" and recommended it to "anyone that likes drinking and/or fun."

Metal Storm called the album an improvement "on the uneven songwriting that made No Grave But the Sea a modest disappointment". Nick Balazs of Brave Words praised the album calling it "more consistent than past efforts." He also stated that since the band has "continued to embrace their silliness, it has resulted in stronger song development and even short tracks, like the foul-mouthed, but musically elegant 1-minute "Shit Boat (No Fans)" and the under 3-minute, accordion led, "Pirate's Scorn" retain credibility and better yet, flow brilliantly within the context of the album."

Deadpress and Ghost Cult Magazine were less positive. Carlos Zelaya of Deadpress described the album "[as] one of many examples of hollow, empty vessels having the most loudest, unbearable resonations." Gary Alcock of Ghost Cult Magazine was slightly more positive stating, "... Curse of the Crystal Coconut does feature some gloriously stupid moments and a few seriously catchy hooks, but like the Indiana Jones movie with a similar title, the lack of ideas apparent on certain tracks suggests the joke might finally [be] wearing thin, even with the band themselves."

== Track listing ==
Curse of the Crystal Coconut track listing
No.	Title	Lyrics	Music	Length
1.	"Treasure Chest Party Quest"	Christopher Bowes	Christopher Bowes, Máté Bodor	4:16
2.	"Fannybaws"	Bowes	Bowes	4:15
3.	"Chomp Chomp" (featuring Mathias "Vreth" Lillmåns)	Elliot Vernon, Bowes, Matthew Bell, Mathias Lillmåns	Matthew Bell	3:33
4.	"Tortuga" (featuring Captain Yarrface)	Bowes	Bell, Peter Stefanovic	3:23
5.	"Zombies Ate My Pirate Ship" (featuring Patty Gurdy)	Bowes	Elliot Vernon	5:05
6.	"Call of the Waves"	Bowes, Vincent Jackson Jones	Bowes, Vincent Jackson Jones	5:05
7.	"Pirate's Scorn"	Timothy William Foy, Paul Koffmann	Timothy William Foy, Paul Koffmann	2:48
8.	"Shit Boat (No Fans)"	Bowes, Peter Alcorn	Bowes	1:15
9.	"Pirate Metal Drinking Crew"	Bowes, Bell	Bowes, Bell, Bodor	3:45
10.	"Wooden Leg Pt. 2 (The Woodening)" (featuring Daiki Tatsuguchi, Kaelhakase and Fernando Rey)	Bowes	Bowes, Vernon	8:07
11.	"Henry Martin"	Traditional	Traditional	2:30
Total length:				44:02

Japanese bonus tracks
No.	Title	Lyrics	Music	Length
12.	"Treasure Chest Party Quest" (16th Century Version)	Christopher Bowes	Christopher Bowes, Máté Bodor	4:18
13.	"Chomp Chomp" (16th Century Version)	Elliot Vernon, Bowes, Matthew Bell, Mathias Lillmåns	Matthew Bell	3:34
14.	"Tortuga" (16th Century Version)	Bowes	Bell, Peter Stefanovic	3:18

Notes

- All production, mixing, and mastering by Lasse Lammert.
- Track listing and credits from the CD Booklet.
- "Pirate's Scorn" is a cover of a song from the Donkey Kong Country animated series.
- "Henry Martin" is the band's cover of a traditional Scottish folk song of the same name.

=== Deluxe version ===
The deluxe version of the album includes the normal track listing, along with what is referred to as "16th Century Version" editions of each track afterwards. These are 8-bit styled recreations of the tracks with bitcrushed vocals.

=== Wooden box set ===
The wooden box set included two bonus tracks on a 7" single, which are "Big Ship Little Ship" and "Bassline Junkie". Singer Christopher Bowes said on a livestream listening party on Napalm Records' YouTube channel that these two songs along with other bonus tracks from past Alestorm albums would be released on Spotify some point in the future.

== Personnel ==
Credits for Curse of the Crystal Coconut

Alestorm

- Christopher Bowes – lead vocals, keytar
- Máté Bodor – guitars
- Gareth Murdock – bass
- Elliot Vernon – keyboards, unclean vocals
- Peter Alcorn – drums

Additional

- Captain Yarrface – rap vocals on "Tortuga"
- Mathias "Vreth" Lillmåns – unclean vocals on "Chomp Chomp"
- Fernando Rey – vocals on "Wooden Leg Pt. 2 (The Woodening)"
- Kaelhakase & Tatsuguchi – vocals on "Wooden Leg Pt. 2 (The Woodening)"
- Ally Storch – violins
- Patty Gurdy – vocals on "Zombies Ate My Pirate Ship" and hurdy gurdy on "Chomp Chomp", "Zombies Ate My Pirate Ship", "Call of the Waves", "Henry Martin", and "Big Ship Little Ship"
- Tobias Hain – trumpet, flugelhorn
- Jan Philipp Jacobs – trombone
- Phil Philp & Emma Phillips – backing vocals
- Joe Carter-Hawkins – backing vocals on "Tortuga"
- Matthew Bell – synthesizer on "Tortuga"
- Ben Turk – additional synthesizers & vocal tuning on "Tortuga"

Production

- Lasse Lammert – production, mixing, mastering
- Dan Goldsworthy – artwork

== Charts ==
Chart performance for Curse of the Crystal Coconut
Chart (2020)	Peak position
Austrian Albums (Ö3 Austria)	15
Belgian Albums (Ultratop Flanders)	15
Belgian Albums (Ultratop Wallonia)	32
Dutch Albums (Album Top 100)	51
French Albums (SNEP)	197
German Albums (Offizielle Top 100)	12
Hungarian Albums (MAHASZ)	23
Scottish Albums (OCC)	10
Swiss Albums (Schweizer Hitparade)	9
UK Albums (OCC)	68
UK Independent Albums (OCC)	4
UK Rock & Metal Albums (OCC)	2
