= Vibraslap =

Percussion instrument

- A vibraslap manufactured by Latin Percussion

Latin Percussion vibraslap showing metal teeth

The vibraslap is a percussion instrument consisting of a piece of stiff wire (bent into a U-shape) connecting a wooden ball to a hollow box of wood with metal “teeth” inside. The percussionist holds the metal wire in one hand and strikes the ball (usually against the palm of their other hand). The box acts as a resonating body for a metal mechanism placed inside with a number of loosely fastened pins or rivets that vibrate and rattle against the box. The instrument is a modern version of the jawbone.

== Invention ==
The vibraslap was the first patent granted to the instrument manufacturing company Latin Percussion.

The vibraslap was invented by Martin Cohen in 1967. Cohen was told by percussionist Bobby Rosengarden, "If you want to make some money, make a jawbone that doesn't break." About the inventing process, Cohen remembers, "I had never seen a jawbone before, but I had heard one on a Cal Tjader album. I found out that it was an animal skull that you would strike, and the sound would come from the teeth-rattling in the loose sockets. So I took that concept and invented the Vibraslap, which was my first patent."

== Origins ==
The vibraslap descended from the African "jawbone". This is the lower jawbone of a donkey or a zebra which has loose teeth that rattle when the instrument is struck. The instrument was carried by enslaved people to South America where it became known as the Quijada.

== Differing names ==
The vibraslap comes in a variety of sizes and materials and is sometimes marketed under the name "Donkey Call", "Donkey Rattle", "Chatterbox" or "Rattleslap."

== Examples in well-known music ==
The vibraslap can be heard clearly on the 1967 US No. 1 hit single "Green Tambourine" by the Lemon Pipers.

Sound of a vibraslap
Sound of LP Vibraslap

Another play
Sound of LP Vibraslap

While recording "Sweet Emotion", Steven Tyler broke the vibraslap on the third attempt at using it. The break can be heard on the recording.

Tally Hall often used a vibraslap named Henry at live shows.
