= List of Running Wild band members =

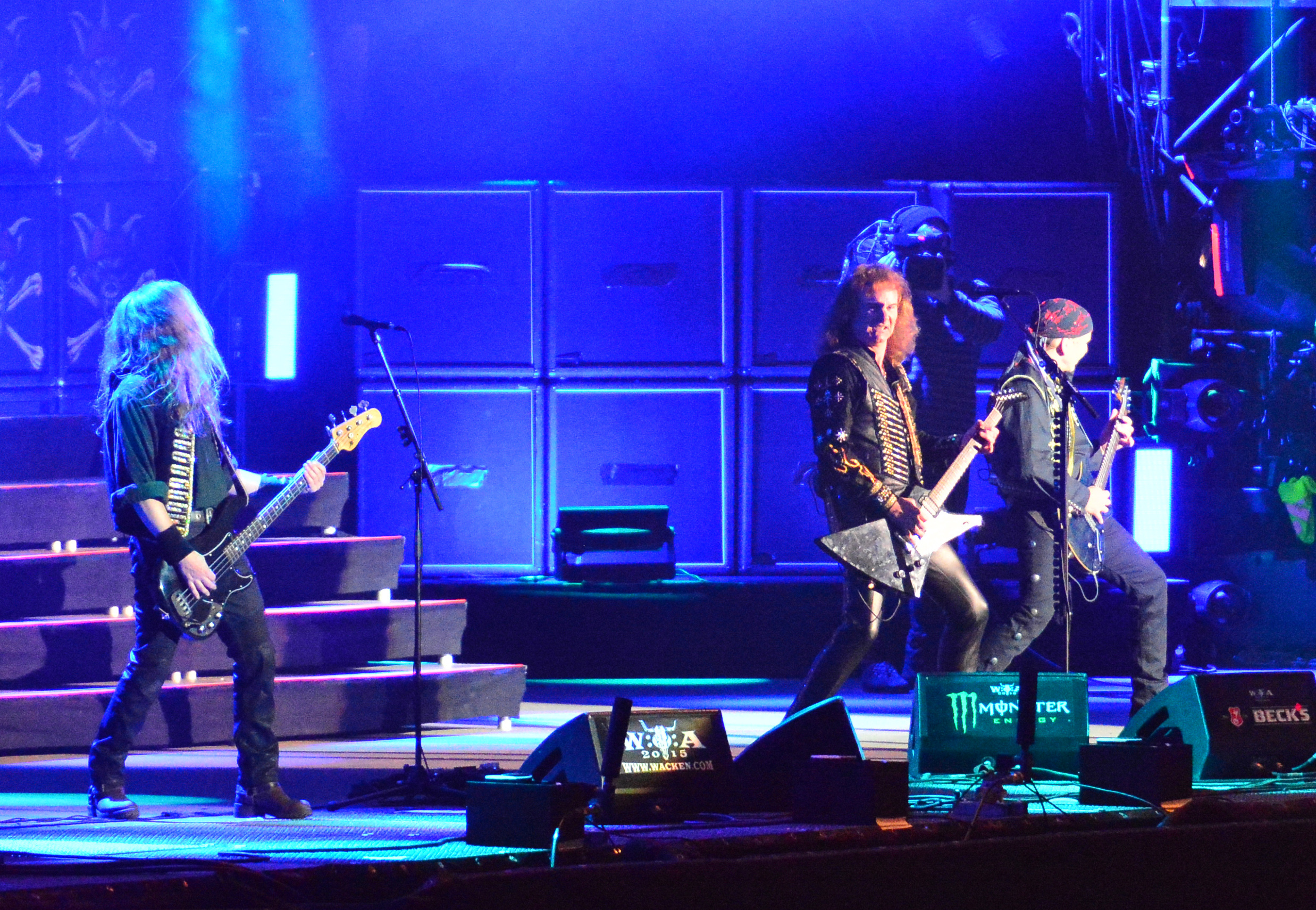
Running Wild performing live in 2015

Running Wild is a German heavy metal band from Hamburg. Formed in 1976 as Granite Heart, the group originally consisted of vocalist and guitarist Rolf "Rock 'n' Rolf" Kasparek, guitarist Uwe Bendig, bassist Jörg Schwarz, and drummer Michael Hoffmann. Kasparek remains the only original member of the band, which now features guitarist Peter J. Jordan (since 2005), bassist Ole Hempelmann and drummer Michael Wolpers (both since 2015).

== History ==
=== 1976–1990 ===
Running Wild was initially founded as Granite Heart in 1976 by Rolf Kasparek with guitarist Uwe Bendig, bassist Jörg Schwarz and drummer Michael Hoffmann. Schwarz was quickly replaced by Carsten Davis, although by 1979 both he and Hoffmann had left the group, which was then renamed Running Wild. With new bassist Matthias Kaufmann and drummer Wolfgang "Hasche" Hagemann, the band released its first demo Rock from Hell in 1981, before temporarily disbanding in the summer of 1982 after just five shows in two years. Kasparek and Hagemann reformed Running Wild in the autumn with new guitarist Gerald "Preacher" Warnecke and bassist Stephan Boriss, releasing a string of demos during 1983 and 1984. The band's debut full-length album Gates to Purgatory was issued later in 1984.

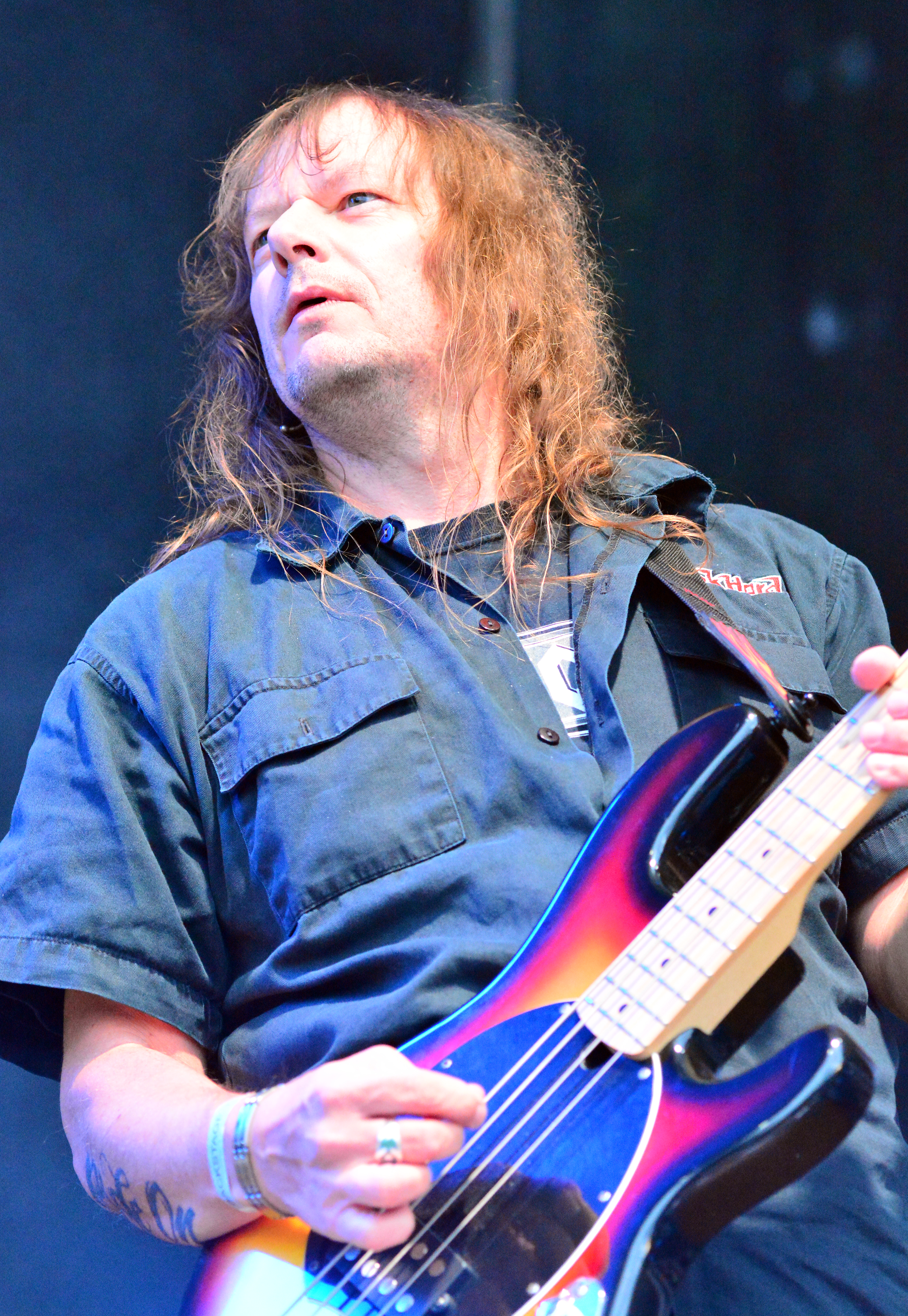
Jens Becker played bass for Running Wild between summer 1987 and spring 1992.

After touring in promotion of Gates to Purgatory ended in the summer of 1985, Warnecke left Running Wild. Kasparek recorded the majority of guitars on the band's second album Branded and Exiled, before Michael "Majk Moti" Kupper arrived in place of Warnecke, adding three guitar solos. The new lineup released Under Jolly Roger in 1987, before Boriss and Hagemann were replaced around July or August by Jens Becker and Stefan Schwarzmann, respectively. Live album Ready for Boarding and studio follow-up Port Royal followed in 1988, after which Iain Finlay replaced Schwarzmann, who left to join U.D.O. Finlay himself left shortly after the release of Death or Glory at the end of 1989, with former stand-in Jörg Michael temporarily taking his place for live shows during 1990. Kupper left towards the end of the year for "personal reasons".

=== 1990–2002 ===
At the end of 1990, Kasparek and Becker recorded Blazon Stone with new guitarist Axel Morgan and drummer Rudiger "AC" Dreiffen. This was followed later in 1991 by The First Years of Piracy, a collection of re-recordings of previous songs. This was the last album to feature Becker on bass and AC on drums, both of whom were fired after touring into the early months of 1992. They were replaced by Thomas "Bodo" Smuszynski and the returning Stefan Schwarzmann, respectively, who debuted together on Pile of Skulls later that year. In 1993, Morgan and Schwarzmann were fired, later joining with fellow alumnus Jens Becker to form X-Wild.

Running Wild released Black Hand Inn in 1994 with new guitarist Thilo Hermann and drummer Jörg Michael. This was followed by Masquerade in 1995 and The Rivalry in 1998, after which Michael left to focus on his other band, Stratovarius. He was replaced on tour by former Rage drummer Chris Efthimiadis, while Angelo Sasso was brought in for the recording of the band's next album, Victory. In January 2001, Kasparek announced that Smuszynski had been let go from the band. His replacement, Peter Pichl, was confirmed in August. The following month, it was announced that Hermann had also left the group, reportedly to "focus on his family life".

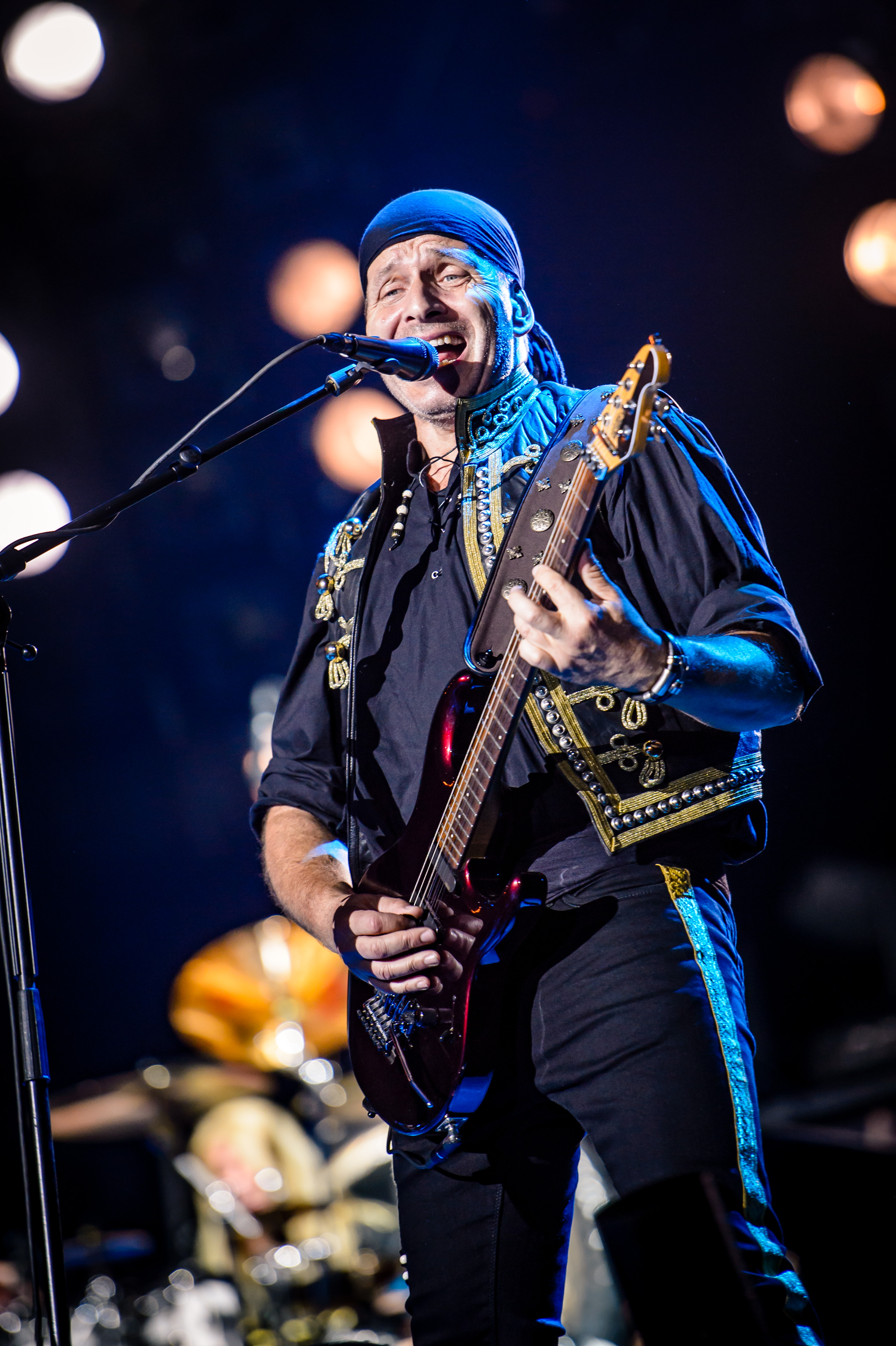
Peter J. Jordan has been Running Wild's second guitarist since summer/fall 2005.

=== Since 2002 ===
The band's next album, The Brotherhood, was released in February 2002 and featured a reduced lineup of Rolf Kasparek on vocals and all guitars, Peter Pichl on bass, and Angelo Sasso on drums. For the tour in promotion of the album, Kasparek and Pichl were joined by new guitarist Bernd Aufermann and drummer Matthias Liebetruth. Aufermann later revealed that he was "nothing more or less than the live guitarist" for the band, with all guitars on 2005's Rogues en Vogue performed by Kasparek. By March 2005, Aufermann had left the band, with Kasparek stating he was "not sure" who would take his place for future tour dates. For shows later that year, Peter J. Jordan took over as live guitarist. Running Wild remained inactive from 2006 to 2009, before it was announced in April 2009 that the band would play a final show on 30 July at Wacken Open Air before disbanding. Jan-Sören Eckert played bass at the show, which was released in 2011 as The Final Jolly Roger.

In October 2011, Kasparek announced that he was reforming Running Wild to record a new album, Shadowmaker. The album was released in April 2012 and featured Jordan playing guitar solos on four tracks, with Kasparek dubbing the album "a solo project". The pair continued to collaborate, releasing Resilient in October 2013. After a year off due to an injury, Kasparek returned in 2015 with a full lineup of Running Wild for its first shows since reforming, adding Ole Hempelmann on bass and Michael Wolpers on drums. This lineup has remained intact to date, releasing Rapid Foray in 2016 and Blood on Blood in 2021.

== Members ==
=== Current ===
Image	Name	Years active	Instruments	Release contributions
	Rolf "Rock 'n' Rolf" Kasparek	1976–1982; 1982–2009; 2011–present	lead vocals; guitar; bass (studio, 2011–2015)	all Running Wild releases
	Peter J. Jordan	2005–2009; 2011–present	guitar; backing vocals	all Running Wild releases from The Final Jolly Roger (2011) onwards
	Ole Hempelmann	2015–present	bass; backing vocals	all Running Wild releases from Rapid Foray (2016) onwards
	Michael Wolpers	2015–present	drums	all Running Wild releases from Rapid Foray (2016) onwards

=== Former ===
Image	Name	Years active	Instruments	Release contributions
	Uwe Bendig	1976–1982	guitar; backing vocals	Rock from Hell demo (1981)
	Michael Hoffmann	1976–1979	drums	none
	Jörg Schwarz	1976	bass	none
	Carsten Davis	1976–1979	bass	none
	Wolfgang "Hasche" Hagemann	1979–1982; 1983–1987	drums; occasional backing vocals	all Running Wild releases from the Rock from Hell demo (1981) to Under Jolly Roger (1987)
	Matthias Kaufmann	1979–1982	bass	Rock from Hell demo (1981)
	Stephan Boriss	1982–1987	bass; backing vocals	all Running Wild releases from the 1982 demo to Under Jolly Roger (1987)
	Gerald "Preacher" Warnecke	1982–1985	guitar; backing vocals	all Running Wild releases from the 1982 demo to Gates to Purgatory (1984)
	Michael "Majk Moti" Kupper	1985–1990 (died 2023)	guitar; backing vocals	all Running Wild releases from Branded and Exiled (1985) to Death or Glory Tour Live (1990)
	Jens Becker	1987–1992	bass; backing vocals	all Running Wild releases from Ready for Boarding (1988) to The First Years of Piracy (1991)
	Stefan Schwarzmann	1987–1988; 1992–1993	drums; backing vocals	Ready for Boarding (1988); Port Royal (1988); Pile of Skulls (1992)
	Iain Finlay	1988–1990	drums	Death or Glory (1989); Wild Animal EP (1990); Death or Glory Tour Live (1990)
	Axel Morgan	1990–1993	guitar; backing vocals	Blazon Stone (1991); The First Years of Piracy (1991); Pile of Skulls (1992)
	Rudiger "AC" Dreffein	1990–1992	drums; backing vocals	Blazon Stone (1991); The First Years of Piracy (1991)
	Thomas "Bodo" Smuszynski	1992–2001	bass; backing vocals	all Running Wild releases from Pile of Skulls (1992) to Victory (2000)
	Thilo Hermann	1993–2001	guitar	Black Hand Inn (1994); Masquerade (1995); The Rivalry (1998); Victory (2000)
	Jörg Michael	1993–1998 (Note: Michael also featured as a temporary stand-in during the summer of 1988 and throughout 1990, either side of Iain Finlay's tenure.)	drums	Black Hand Inn (1994); Masquerade (1995); The Rivalry (1998)
	Chris "Efti" Efthimiadis	1998–2000 (touring only)	drums	none
	Angelo Sasso	1999–2001 (session only)	drums	Victory (2000); The Brotherhood (2002)
	Peter Pichl	2001–2009	bass; backing vocals	The Brotherhood (2002); Live (2002); 20 Years in History (2003); Rogues en Vogue (2005)
	Matthias Liebetruth	2002–2009	drums; backing vocals	Live (2002); 20 Years in History (2003); Rogues en Vogue (2005); The Final Jolly Roger (2011)
	Bernd Aufermann	2002–2004 (touring only)	guitar; backing vocals	Live (2002)
	Jan-Sören Eckert	2009 (touring only)	bass; backing vocals	The Final Jolly Roger (2011)

== Lineups ==
Period	Members	Releases
1976 (as Granite Heart)	Rock 'n' Rolf Kasparek — lead vocals, guitar; Uwe Bendig — guitar, backing vocals; Jörg Schwarz — bass; Michael Hoffmann — drums	none
1976–1979 (as Granite Heart)	Rock 'n' Rolf Kasparek — lead vocals, guitar; Uwe Bendig — guitar, backing vocals; Carsten Davis — bass; Michael Hoffmann — drums	none
1979–summer 1982	Rock 'n' Rolf Kasparek — lead vocals, guitar; Uwe Bendig — guitar, backing vocals; Matthias Kaufmann — bass; Wolfgang Hagemann — drums	Rock from Hell demo (1981)
Band inactive summer–fall 1982
Fall 1982–summer 1985	Rock 'n' Rolf Kasparek — lead vocals, guitar; Gerald Warnecke — guitar, backing vocals; Stephan Boriss — bass, backing vocals; Wolfgang Hagemann — drums	1983 and 1984 demos; Victim of States Power (1984); Gates to Purgatory (1984)
Summer 1985–summer 1987	Rock 'n' Rolf Kasparek — lead vocals, guitar; Majk Moti — guitar, backing vocals; Stephan Boriss — bass, backing vocals; Wolfgang Hagemann — drums	Branded and Exiled (1985) (Note: Moti appears on three tracks only on Branded and Exiled, as Kasparek had recorded the majority of guitar parts before his arrival.); Under Jolly Roger (1987)
July 1987–summer 1988	Rock 'n' Rolf Kasparek — lead vocals, guitar; Majk Moti — guitar, backing vocals; Jens Becker — bass, backing vocals; Stefan Schwarzmann — drums, backing vocals	Ready for Boarding (1988); Port Royal (1988)
Summer 1988	Rock 'n' Rolf Kasparek — lead vocals, guitar; Majk Moti — guitar, backing vocals; Jens Becker — bass, backing vocals; Jörg Michael — drums (temporary)	none — live performances only
Summer 1988–January 1990	Rock 'n' Rolf Kasparek — lead vocals, guitar; Majk Moti — guitar, backing vocals; Jens Becker — bass, backing vocals; Iain Finlay — drums	Death or Glory (1989); Wild Animal EP (1990); Death or Glory Tour Live (1990)
Early–late 1990	Rock 'n' Rolf Kasparek — lead vocals, guitar; Majk Moti — guitar, backing vocals; Jens Becker — bass, backing vocals; Jörg Michael — drums (temporary)	none — live performances only
Late 1990–spring 1992	Rock 'n' Rolf Kasparek — lead vocals, guitar; Axel Morgan — guitar, backing vocals; Jens Becker — bass, backing vocals; AC Dreffein — drums, backing vocals	Blazon Stone (1991); The First Years of Piracy (1991)
1992–1993	Rock 'n' Rolf Kasparek — lead vocals, guitar; Axel Morgan — guitar, backing vocals; Thomas Smuszynski — bass, backing vocals; Stefan Schwarzmann — drums, backing vocals	Pile of Skulls (1992)
1993–1998	Rock 'n' Rolf Kasparek — lead vocals, guitar; Thilo Hermann — guitar; Thomas Smuszynski — bass, backing vocals; Jörg Michael — drums	Black Hand Inn (1994); Masquerade (1995); The Rivalry (1998)
Spring 1998–January 2001	Rock 'n' Rolf Kasparek — lead vocals, guitar; Thilo Hermann — guitar; Thomas Smuszynski — bass, backing vocals; Chris Efthimiadis — drums (touring only); Angelo Sasso — drums (session only)	Victory (2000)
August 2001–January 2002	Rock 'n' Rolf Kasparek — lead vocals, guitar; Peter Pichl — bass, backing vocals; Angelo Sasso — drums (session only)	The Brotherhood (2002)
January 2002–summer 2004	Rock 'n' Rolf Kasparek — lead vocals, guitar; Bernd Aufermann — guitar (touring only); Peter Pichl — bass, backing vocals; Matthias Liebetruth — drums, backing vocals	Live (2002); 20 Years in History (2003)
Late 2004–summer 2005	Rock 'n' Rolf Kasparek — lead vocals, guitar; Peter Pichl — bass, backing vocals; Matthias Liebetruth — drums, backing vocals	Rogues en Vogue (2005)
Summer 2005–June 2009	Rock 'n' Rolf Kasparek — lead vocals, guitar; Peter J. Jordan — guitar (touring only); Peter Pichl — bass, backing vocals; Matthias Liebetruth — drums, backing vocals	none — live performances only
June–July 2009	Rock 'n' Rolf Kasparek — lead vocals, guitar; Peter J. Jordan — guitar (touring only); Jan-Sören Eckert — bass (touring only); Matthias Liebetruth — drums, backing vocals	The Final Jolly Roger (2011)
Band inactive August 2009–October 2011
October 2011–June 2015	Rock 'n' Rolf Kasparek — lead vocals, guitar; Peter J. Jordan — guitar, backing vocals	Shadowmaker (2012); Resilient (2013)
June 2015–present	Rock 'n' Rolf Kasparek — lead vocals, guitar; Peter J. Jordan — guitar, backing vocals; Ole Hempelmann — bass, backing vocals; Michael Wolpers — drums	Rapid Foray (2016); Crossing the Blades (2019); New Gems and Live Treasures (2021); Blood on Blood (2021)
