= The Final Jolly Roger =

2011 live album by Running Wild

Live album by Running Wild
- Released: 24 June 2011
- Recorded: 30 July 2009 at Wacken Open Air in Wacken, Schleswig-Holstein
- Genre: Heavy metal
- Length: 93:35
- Label: Golden Core Records

Running Wild chronology
Live (2002)	The Final Jolly Roger (2011)

The Final Jolly Roger is a live album by German heavy metal band Running Wild, released on 24 June 2011 via Golden Core Records. It was recorded and filmed at Wacken Open Air on 30 July 2009 for a CD and DVD release. This was known at the time as the "final" show when Rolf Kasparek announced the band's split on 17 April 2009 before reuniting in 2011.

== CD track listing ==
Disc 1
No.	Title	Length
1.	"Intro"	1:45
2.	"Port Royal"	4:43
3.	"Bad to the Bone"	5:47
4.	"Riding the Storm"	5:17
5.	"Soulless"	6:23
6.	"Prisoner of Our Time"	5:26
7.	"Black Hand Inn"	5:27
8.	"Purgatory"	5:42
9.	"The Battle of Waterloo"	8:27
10.	"Der Kaltverformer" (Intro)	3:28
11.	"Raging Fire"	4:08
Total length:		56:33

Disc 2
No.	Title	Length
1.	"Whirlwind"	5:46
2.	"Tortuga Bay"	4:09
3.	"Branded and Exiled"	8:04
4.	"Raise Your Fist"	7:07
5.	"Conquistadores"	6:05
6.	"Under Jolly Roger"	5:51
Total length:		37:02

== DVD track listing ==
The Final Jolly Roger

Video by Running Wild
- Released: 24 June 2011
- Recorded: 30 July 2009
- Venue: Wacken Open Air in Wacken, Schleswig-Holstein
- Genre: Heavy metal
- Label: Golden Core Records

Running Wild chronology
Live (2002)	The Final Jolly Roger (2011)

Professional ratings
Review scores
Source	Rating
Terrorverlag	9/10 stars

No.	Title	Length
1.	"Intro"
2.	"Port Royal"
3.	"Bad to the Bone"
4.	"Riding the Storm"
5.	"Soulless"
6.	"Prisoner of Our Time"
7.	"Black Hand Inn"
8.	"Purgatory"
9.	"The Battle of Waterloo"
10.	"Der Kaltverformer" (Intro)
11.	"Raging Fire"
12.	"Whirlwind"
13.	"Tortuga Bay"
14.	"Branded and Exiled"
15.	"Raise Your Fist"
16.	"Conquistadores"
17.	"Under Jolly Roger"

Extras

- Tour report 1994–1996
- Studio report – "Masquerade" album
- Keep Smiling
- Interviews: April 2009 Part I / Part II / Part III / Wacken 2009

== Notes ==
- "The Brotherhood" and "Draw the Line" were performed at the event, played one after the other between "Raging Fire" and "Whirlwind", but is not included on neither release.
- Released as a double CD, separate DVD, deluxe edition with both formats packaged together and on vinyl.

== Personnel ==
- Rolf Kasparek – vocals, guitars
- Peter Jordan – guitars
- Matthias Liebetruth – drums

Guest musician

- Jan-Sören Eckert – bass

Production

- Rolf Kasparek – producer, mixing
- Katharina Nowy – assistant producer
- Thomas Jensen – executive producer
- Marcel Schleiff – producer
- Herwig Meyszner – producer
- Dirk Illing – cover art
- Nicky Nowy – mastering

== Charts ==
Chart (2011)	Peak position
German Albums (Offizielle Top 100)	52
