= Port Royal (album) =

Studio album by Running Wild
- Released: 26 September 1988
- Recorded: June 1988
- Studios: Sky Trak Studio, Berlin, Germany
- Genres: Heavy metal; power metal; pirate metal
- Length: 44:15
- Label: Noise
- Producers: Running Wild, Karl-Ulrich Walterbach

Running Wild chronology
Ready for Boarding (1988)	Port Royal (1988)	Death or Glory (1989)

Professional ratings
Review scores
Source	Rating
AllMusic	4/5 stars
Collector's Guide to Heavy Metal	8/10
Rock Hard	7.5/10

Port Royal is the fourth album by German heavy metal band Running Wild. It expanded on the pirate themes introduced in their album Under Jolly Roger (1987) and established them as "pirate metal" in the metal community. The album takes its name from the location of pirate John Rackham's death.

In 2017, Loudwire ranked Port Royal as the 23rd-best power metal album of all time.

== Songs ==
"Uaschitschun" tells about the pollution of nature through a Native American's perspective. "Uaschitschun" (wašíču) is a Lakota word meaning "a non-native person", especially "white people" . The ending words were originally spoken by filmmaker Alanis Obomsawin in 1972 and were probably inspired by a famous speech made by Chief Seattle to the whites when they came to buy the lands of Seattle.

A music video was made for "Conquistadores" which had some air play on MTV's Headbangers Ball. It is also the first to use a 5-string bass in a metal context.

"Warchild" is not the same song that appeared in the band's early demos.

"Calico Jack" is about an English pirate of the 18th century. He designed the skull-and-bones pirate flag that was later named the Jolly Roger, which gave the title to the previous album.

== Track listing ==
All tracks are written by Rolf Kasparek, except where noted.

Side A
No.	Title	Writer(s)	Length
1.	"Intro"		0:50
2.	"Port Royal"		4:12
3.	"Raging Fire"	Kasparek, Schwarzmann, Moti	3:28
4.	"Into the Arena"	Moti	3:59
5.	"Uaschitschun"		4:53
6.	"Final Gates" (instrumental)	Becker	3:00

Side B
No.	Title	Writer(s)	Length
7.	"Conquistadores"		4:50
8.	"Blown to Kingdom Come"	Moti	3:19
9.	"Warchild"	Kasparek, Schwarzmann	3:01
10.	"Mutiny"	Kasparek, Schwarzmann	4:28
11.	"Calico Jack"	Kasparek, Moti, Schwarzmann	8:15
Total length:			44:15

2017 remastered bonus tracks
No.	Title	Length
1.	"Uaschitschun" (1992 alternate version)	5:04
2.	"Port Royal" (2003 re-recorded version)	4:13
3.	"Conquistadors" (2003 re-recorded version)	4:48
Total length:		58:20

== Notes ==
- The 1st press CD release has no barcode. There were two variants of the backcover, one with yellow and one with white Noise logo. SID codes refer to the French press which has the white Noise logo
- The Japanese CD release contains the 1987 album Under Jolly Roger

== Personnel ==
- Rolf Kasparek – vocals, guitars
- Majk Moti – guitars
- Jens Becker – bass
- Stefan Schwarzmann – drums

Production

- Karl-Ulrich Walterbach – executive producer
- Tom Steeler – engineering, mixing
- Sebastian Krüger – artwork
- Becker Derouet – artwork

== Charts ==
Chart (1988)	Peak position
Finnish Albums (The Official Finnish Charts)	36
