= Death or Glory (album) =

Studio album by Running Wild
- Released: 8 November 1989
- Recorded: July–August 1989
- Studios: Studio M, Hanover
- Genres: Heavy metal, power metal, pirate metal
- Length: 50:06
- Label: Noise/EMI
- Producers: Rolf Kasparek, Karl-Ulrich Walterbach

Running Wild chronology
Port Royal (1988)	Death or Glory (1989)	Blazon Stone (1991)

Singles from Death or Glory
- 1. "Bad to the Bone" Released: 8 November 1989

Death or Glory is the fifth studio album by German heavy metal band Running Wild, released 8 November 1989 through Noise Records. It is the band's last album with both guitarist Majk Moti and drummer Ian Finlay. Being one of their most successful releases, it contains the concert favourites "Riding the Storm" and "Bad to the Bone". The final track, "March On", was not included on the vinyl release due to space constraints.

The CD version (both the original and remastered) of the album contains 1991's Wild Animal EP, albeit with a different running order than that of the original. However, despite the presence of Wild Animal on the original pressing CD, neither the booklet nor back insert tray mention these songs. But the CD non-playing side (of the original pressing), however, does list the 4 songs from this EP. The booklet on the remastered version has the full info on including of the EP.

Running Wild filmed a live video to the song "Bad to the Bone", recorded in Düsseldorf. The song had some airtime at MTVs Headbangers Ball. "Riding the Storm" also had a live video that was also shot in Düsseldorf with a crowd of nearly 9,000 attendees.

The track "Bad to the Bone" was recorded by a cappella band Van Canto and was released on their fourth studio album Break the Silence.

== Critical reception ==
Professional ratings
Review scores
Source	Rating
AllMusic	3/5 stars
Rock Hard	8/10

Death or Glory was ranked number 285 in Rock Hard magazine's 2005 book The 500 Greatest Rock & Metal Albums of All Time and number 17 on Metal Hammer's list of the 25 best power metal albums of all time.

== Death or Glory Tour ==
A live VHS tape of the band playing a live concert at Düsseldorf during the Death or Glory Tour was released by Fotodisk and later by Bonsai Music.

The videotape features 11 tracks including a live version of three songs from Death or Glory ("Riding the Storm", "Bad to the Bone" and "Tortuga Bay").

== Track listing ==
Side A
No.	Title	Lyrics	Music	Length
1.	"Riding the Storm"	Rolf Kasparek	Kasparek	6:30
2.	"Renegade"	Iain Finlay	Kasparek	4:29
3.	"Evilution"	Finlay	Kasparek, Jens Becker	4:43
4.	"Running Blood"	Kasparek	Kasparek	4:30
5.	"Highland Glory (The Eternal Fight)" (instrumental)		Becker, Finlay	4:52

Side B
No.	Title	Lyrics	Music	Length
6.	"Marooned"	Kasparek, Finlay	Kasparek	5:13
7.	"Bad to the Bone"	Kasparek, Finlay	Kasparek	4:46
8.	"Tortuga Bay"	Kasparek, Finlay	Kasparek	3:17
9.	"Death or Glory"	Majk Moti, Finlay	Moti	4:00
10.	"Battle of Waterloo"	Kasparek	Kasparek	7:46
Total length:				50:06

CD bonus track
No.	Title	Lyrics	Music	Length
1.	"March On" (from the Bad to the Bone EP)	Moti	Moti	4:12
Total length:				54:18

1990 re-issue bonus tracks
No.	Title	Lyrics	Music	Length
1.	"March On" (from the Bad to the Bone EP)	Moti	Moti	4:12
2.	"Wild Animal" (from the Wild Animal EP)	Kasparek	Kasparek	4:11
3.	"Chains & Leather" (from the Wild Animal EP)	Moti	Moti	5:46
4.	"Tear Down the Walls" (from the Wild Animal EP)	Moti	Kasparek	4:17
5.	"Störtebeker" (from the Wild Animal EP)	Kasparek	Kasparek	4:05
Total length:				72:38

The 2017 remastered version contains a second disc, featuring the following songs

No.	Title	Lyrics	Music	Length
1.	"March On" (from the Bad to the Bone EP)	Moti	Moti	4:12
2.	"Wild Animal" (from the Wild Animal EP)	Kasparek	Kasparek	4:11
3.	"Chains & Leather" (from the Wild Animal EP)	Moti	Moti	5:46
4.	"Tear Down the Walls" (from the Wild Animal EP)	Moti	Kasparek	4:17
5.	"Störtebeker" (from the Wild Animal EP)	Kasparek	Kasparek	4:05
6.	"Riding the Storm" (2003 re-recorded version)	Kasparek	Kasparek	6:30
7.	"Bad to the Bone" (2003 re-recorded version)	Kasparek, Finlay	Kasparek	4:46

== Personnel ==
- Rolf Kasparek – vocals, guitars
- Majk Moti – guitars
- Jens Becker – bass
- Iain Finlay – drums

Additional Musician

- Ladislav Křížek – backing vocals

Production

- Jan Němec – engineering, mixing
- Martin Becker – photography
- Sebastian Krüger – artwork
- Rock 'n' Rolf – producer
- Karl-U. Walterbach – executive producer

== Charts ==
Chart (1989)	Peak position
German Albums (Offizielle Top 100)	45
