= The Dread Crew of Oddwood =

American pirate-themed band

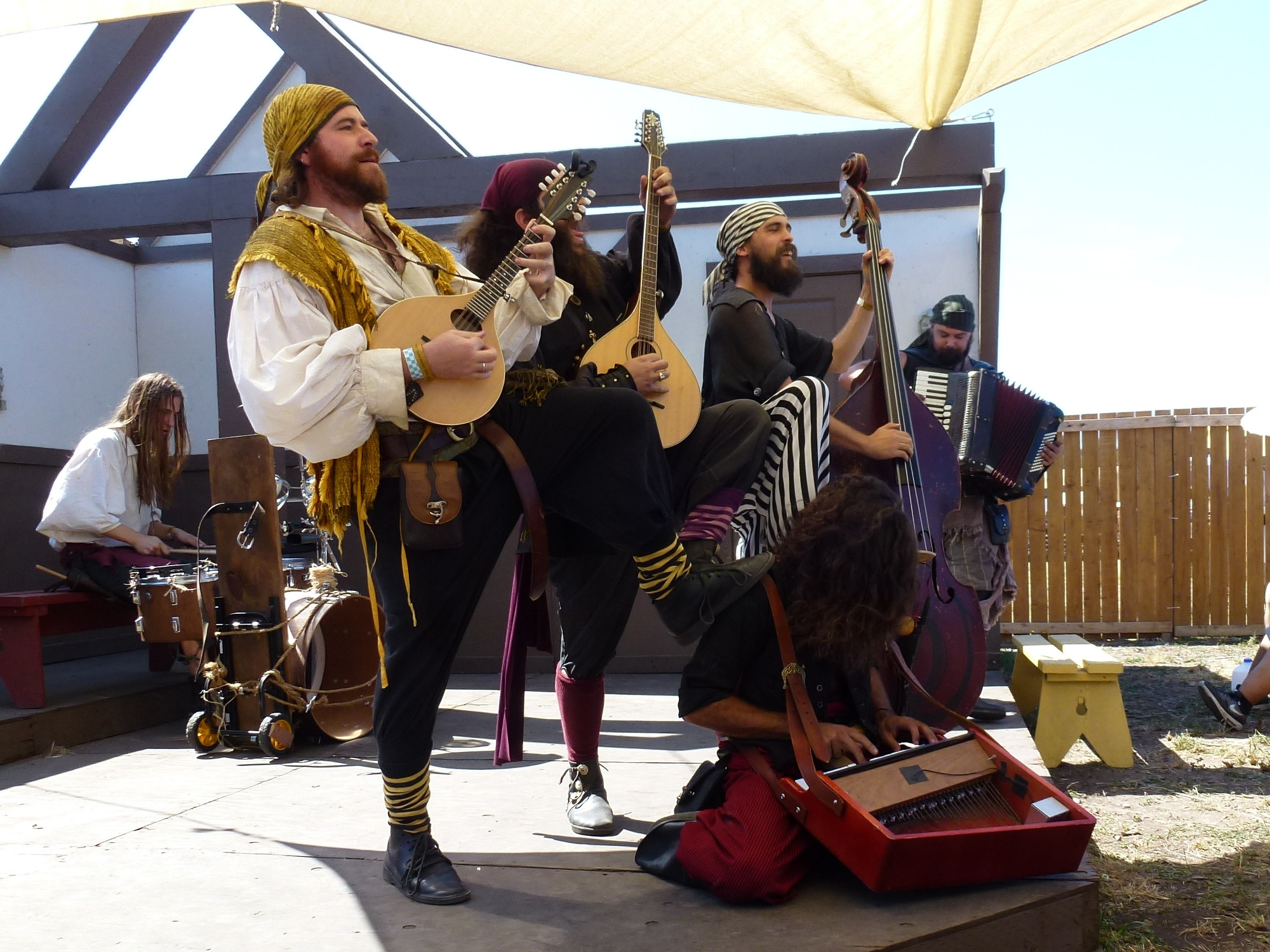
- The Dread Crew of Oddwood performing at the Washington Midsummer Renaissance Faire.

Background information
- Origin: San Diego, California
- Genres: Acoustic, pirate metal, folk metal
- Years active: 2008–present
- Members: Wolfbeard O'Brady; Riven Rahl; Smithy Crow; Stark Cordwain; Deckard Cordwain; T-Bone
- Past members: Elvil Rumsik; Victor Crow; Finwe Theodore; Nathaniel Grizzlejaw; Rouba Juba; Castle
- Website: thedreadcrewofoddwood.com

The Dread Crew of Oddwood is an acoustic pirate band from San Diego, California. Their music, referred to by the band as "Heavy Mahogany", is characterized by a pirate theme and heavy use of acoustic instruments.

== Biography ==
The Dread Crew of Oddwood formed as an eight-piece in 2008 after Wolfbeard O'Brady organized a meeting at San Diego Comic Con for fans of the Sega Genesis game Ecco the Dolphin. Only eight people showed up to the meeting, and the group formed the band's original lineup. A year later, The Dread Crew of Oddwood released their debut album, Reign the Helm, featuring a lineup of Elvil Rumsik (Anthony Montemarano), Wolfbeard O'Brady (Reece Miller), Riven Rahl (Mike Montemarano), Finwe Theodore (Nick Montemarano), Nathaniel Grizzlejaw (Ian Luckey), F.R.A.N.C.I.S. (later known as Rouba Juba), Castle (Drew Peters), and Victor Crow.

The band quickly gathered a following performing at various Renaissance faires around the United States. Soon after the release of Reign the Helm, however, members Elvil Rumsik and Victor Crow left the band, and Smithy Crow joined.

In 2010, The Dread Crew of Oddwood released their sophomore album, Rocktopus, as well as their first music video, filmed for the lead single from Rocktopus, "Queen's Decree". Between the release of Rocktopus and their third album, members Finwe Theodore and Nathaniel Grizzlejaw also left the band, while brothers Stark and Deckard Cordwain joined the group.

The band's third album, entitled Heavy Mahogany, was released in early 2012 after a successful crowdfunding campaign.

In early 2015, the band embarked on Piratefest, a tour featuring Alestorm as the headlining act and Swashbuckle as direct support. Soon after the tour, long-time drummer Castle announced his departure from the band, shortly followed by Rouba Juba, leaving Wolfbeard O'Brady and Riven Rahl as the only remaining original members. The band quickly announced their new drummer, Legendary Pirate King Eric "The" Brown, who is also a member of Swashbuckle, also known as Chiptune artist Rainbowdragoneyes.

In late 2015, The Dread Crew of Oddwood entered the studio to begin recording their fourth album, Lawful Evil, which was released in 2016.

In 2018, they announced that Legendary Pirate King Eric "The" Brown was departing from 'the crew', being replaced by drummer Vicky C.

They released their fifth album, Rust and Glory, on March 15, 2024. Following the albums release they began their first tour since 2019, supporting the Faroese folk metal band Týr along with Aether Realm from the United States and TrollfesT from Norway.

== Musical style ==
The Dread Crew of Oddwood play a combination of folk music, heavy metal and traditional Celtic music. The band performs using only traditional and acoustic instruments, including the accordion, mandolin, tin whistle, bouzouki, toy piano, and stand-up bass.

== Band members ==
Current

- Wolfbeard O'Brady – accordion, whistles, vocals (2008–present)
- Smithy Crow – bass, orchestral strings, vocals (2009–present)
- Stark Cordwain – Irish bouzouki, whistles, vocals (2011–present)
- Deckard Cordwain – mandolin, ukulele, vocals (2011–present)
- Pete – drums (2019–present)
- Dagna(sty) Silesia – upright bass (2025–present)

Former

- Elvil Rumsik – guitar, vocals (2008–2009)
- Victor Crow – bass, vocals (2008–2009), drums (2018–2019)
- Finwe Theodore – tenor ukulele, vocals (2008-2010)
- Nathaniel Grizzlejaw – concertina, vocals (2008–2011)
- Castle – drums, vocals (2008-2015)
- Rouba Juba (Formerly known as F.R.A.N.C.I.S.) – guitar, mandolin, vocals (2008–2015)
- Riven Rahl – toy piano, vocals (2008–2019)
- T-Bone – drums (2015–2018)

Timeline

== Discography ==
The Dread Crew of Oddwood discography
- Studio albums: 5
- Music videos: 6
- Compilation appearances: 1

=== Studio albums ===
- Reign the Helm (2009)
- Rocktopus (2010)
- Heavy Mahogany (2012)
- Lawful Evil (2016)
- Rust & Glory (2024)

=== Music videos ===
| Year | Song | Album | Director | Type | Link |
|---|---|---|---|---|---|
| 2011 | "Queen's Decree" | Rocktopus | Grant Olin | Narrative | |
| 2014 | "Battle Metal" (Turisas Cover) | N/A | Unknown | Performance | |
| 2014 | "Wooden Pints" (Korpiklaani Cover) | N/A | Unknown | Performance | |
| 2016 | "Sulfur" | Lawful Evil | Michael Sasso | Performance | |
| 2016 | "Dead Man's Medley" | Lawful Evil | Unknown | Performance | [5] |
| 2023 | "Leather Ship" | Rust & Glory | Kyle Cooper | Performance | [6] |

=== Singles ===
- The Ballad of Edward Kenway (2013) – commissioned by Ubisoft to promote Assassin's Creed IV: Black Flag
- Battle Metal (2014) – Turisas cover
- Wooden Pints (2014) – Korpiklaani cover
