= Gates to Purgatory =

Studio album by Running Wild
- Released: 1984
- Recorded: 1984
- Studio: Caet Studio, Berlin
- Genre: Speed metal, heavy metal
- Length: 33:41
- Label: Noise (Germany); Combat (US)
- Producer: Running Wild, Horst Müller

Running Wild chronology
Gates to Purgatory (1984)	Branded and Exiled (1985)

Professional ratings
Review scores
Source	Rating
Collector's Guide to Heavy Metal	4/10
metal.de	8/10
Rock Hard	9/10

Gates to Purgatory is the debut studio album by German heavy metal band Running Wild, released in 1984. Predating their pirate themes, the album features mostly satanically-influenced lyrics, alongside songs with anarchic and libertarian (in the sense of European libertarianism) themes. The lyrical content was partly influenced by Gerald "Preacher" Warnecke's studies in theology. He left the band shortly after the album's release to become a vicar.

Despite not being actively promoted, the album sold over 20,000 copies within the first three months, and influenced several other bands worldwide.

It was reissued in 2012 by Lemon Records and in 2017 by Noise Records.

== Track listing ==
All tracks are written by Rolf Kasparek except where noted.

Side A
No.	Title	Writer(s)	Length
1.	"Victim of States Power"	Warnecke	3:39
2.	"Black Demon"		4:29
3.	"Preacher"	Kasparek, Warnecke	4:26
4.	"Soldiers of Hell"		3:30

Side B
No.	Title	Writer(s)	Length
5.	"Diabolic Force"	Kasparek, Warnecke	5:04
6.	"Adrian S.O.S."		2:54
7.	"Genghis Khan"		4:13
8.	"Prisoner of Our Time"	Warnecke	5:26
Total length:			33:41

US and Canadian CD bonus tracks
No.	Title	Writer(s)	Length
1.	"Walpurgis Night"	Warnecke	4:41
2.	"Satan"		4:08
Total length:			42:30

2017 remastered bonus tracks
No.	Title	Length
1.	"Chains & Leather" (from the 1983 Rock From Hell – German Metal Attack compilation)	5:10
2.	"Adrian" (from the 1983 Rock From Hell – German Metal Attack compilation)	2:44
3.	"Walpurgis Night" (from The First Years of Piracy)	5:19
4.	"Satan" (from the 1984 Victim of States Power EP)	4:08
5.	"Iron Heads" (from the 1984 Death Metal split album)	3:38
6.	"Bones to Ashes" (from the 1984 Death Metal split album)	5:17
7.	"Soldiers of Hell" (re-recorded)	3:22
8.	"Prisoner of Our Time" (re-recorded)	4:34
Total length:		67:53

- The bonus track "Walpurgis Night" cuts off near the end on most releases due to the condition of the master tape.
- The 1991 Japanese release contains the 1985 album Branded and Exiled.

== Personnel ==
- Rolf Kasparek – guitar, vocals
- Gerald "Preacher" Warnecke – guitar
- Stephan Boriss – bass
- Wolfgang "Hasche" Hagemann – drums

Production

- Running Wild – producer, artwork
- Horst Müller – producer, recording
- D. Magnussen – photography

== Cover versions ==
- The sludge metal band Kingdom of Sorrow covered the song "Soldiers of Hell" on their album Behind the Blackest Tears.
