= Blood on Blood =

Studio album by Running Wild
- Released: 29 October 2021
- Recorded: 2020
- Genres: Heavy metal; power metal; pirate metal
- Length: 55:40
- Label: Steamhammer
- Producer: Rolf Kasparek

Running Wild chronology
Rapid Foray (2016)	Blood on Blood (2021)

Singles from Blood on Blood
- 1. "Crossing the Blades" Released: 6 December 2019; 2. "Diamonds & Pearls" Released: 13 August 2021; 3. "The Shellback" Released: 24 September 2021

Blood on Blood is the seventeenth studio album by the German heavy metal band Running Wild, their first album in five years since 2016's Rapid Foray. It was released by Steamhammer Records on 29 October 2021.

In December 2019, an EP titled Crossing the Blades was released as an early hint for a new album. Two more singles were released in advance, closer to the album's release date: "Diamonds & Pearls" on 13 August 2021 and "The Shellback" on 24 September 2021.

== Critical reception ==
Professional ratings
Review scores
Source	Rating
Blabbermouth	7/10
laut.de	2/5
Powermetal.de	9.5/10

Rock Hard magazine praised Blood on Blood, saying that the album "should really stir up the German album charts soon. Every bet!". That promise is fulfilled with the album reaching number 8 on the German album charts.

Metal Hammer has noted highlight tracks from the album including "the solid rock ballad 'One Night One Day' as well as the ten-minute bouncer 'The Iron Times 1618-1648', in which Rolf [Kasparek] epically addresses the Thirty Years' War."

Vampster called it a strong and varied album.

== Track listing ==
No.	Title	Length
1.	"Blood on Blood"	4:07
2.	"Wings of Fire"	3:57
3.	"Say Your Prayers"	5:08
4.	"Diamonds & Pearls"	4:47
5.	"Wild & Free"	5:27
6.	"Crossing the Blades"	6:00
7.	"One Night, One Day"	4:59
8.	"The Shellback"	6:11
9.	"Wild, Wild Nights"	4:34
10.	"The Iron Times (1618–1648)"	10:30
Total length:		55:40

Japan edition bonus tracks
No.	Title	Length
11.	"Stargazed"	3:43
12.	"Strutter" (Kiss cover)	3:08
13.	"Ride on the Wild Side"	4:06
Total length:		67:11

Crossing the Blades promotional EP contains an earlier recording of the EP's title track and the bonus tracks of the Japan edition of Blood on Blood.

New Gems and Live Treasures promotional EP
No.	Title	Length
1.	"Wings of Fire"	4:01
2.	"Crossing the Blades"	6:00
3.	"Fistful of Dynamite" (Live in Wacken Open Air 2018)	4:59
4.	"Bad to the Bone" (Live in Wacken Open Air 2018)	5:03
5.	"Rapid Foray" (Live in Wacken Open Air 2018)	4:56
6.	"Uaschitschun" (Live in Wacken Open Air 2018)	4:56
Total length:		29:55

== Personnel ==
- Rolf Kasparek – vocals, lead and rhythm guitars, additional bass
- Peter Jordan – lead guitars
- Ole Hempelmann – bass
- Michael Wolpers – drums

Production

- Rolf Kasparek – producer, recording, mixing, photography
- Timetools Mastering – mastering
- Jens Reinhold – artwork, layout

== Charts ==
Chart performance for Blood on Blood
Chart (2021)	Peak position
Austrian Albums (Ö3 Austria)	27
German Albums (Offizielle Top 100)	8
Swiss Albums (Schweizer Hitparade)	18
