= Thilo Hermann =

German guitarist

Thilo Herrmann
- Born: 19 September 1964 (age 62); Mühlhausen, East Germany
- Genres: Heavy metal, power metal
- Occupations: Guitarist
- Years active: 1985–present

Thilo Herrmann (born 19 September 1964) is a German guitarist who worked with the heavy metal bands Running Wild (1994–2001) and Grave Digger (2008–2009).

== History ==
Prior to joining his latest band Grave Digger in 2007, Herrmann has played with a lot of other different kinds of metal bands. One of the first bigger bands he played with in his career was the heavy metal/hard rock band Faithful Breath (earlier a progressive rock band) , which he joined in 1985. That band changed their name to Risk some years after he joined the band. He did not record anything on their first album as Risk, which is called The Daily Horror News. He did come back however in 1989, and during this time in the band he recorded one EP and two albums and then left them again.

In 1994 Thilo was recruited as guitarist for the famous German heavy metal band Running Wild, where he played on their album Black Hand Inn, as well as three other albums. He left the band in 2001 about a year after their album Victory was released.

Several years later, Grave Digger was planning to add a second guitarist for the first time ever during their existence. A competition was held at the official Grave Digger homepage where the fans could guess who the new second guitarist would be. On 8 October 2007 it was revealed that it was Thilo. He played his first gig with the band on 31 October in Zeche Bochum. Thilo left Grave Digger in February 2009.

Apart from those bands, he has also played with Steel Dragon, Höllenhunde, Glenmore, and Holy Moses during a period in 1988. He did not record anything with any of these bands, though.

== Discography ==
=== Faithful Breath ===
- Skol (1985)
- Live (1986)

=== Risk ===
- Ratman [EP] (1989)
- Hell's Animals (1989)
- Dirty Surfaces (1990)

=== Running Wild ===
- The Privateer [EP] (1994)
- Black Hand Inn (1994)
- Masquerade (1995)
- The Rivalry (1998)
- Victory (2000)

=== Grave Digger ===
- Pray [EP] (2008)
- Ballads of a Hangman (2009)
