= Stormspell Records =

American record label

Stormspell Records is an independent record label from California, United States, founded in San Jose in 2006.

== Policy ==
Stormspell specializes in 1980's classic heavy metal/speed metal/thrash metal limited re-issues, although they represent all rock and metal genres as well.

The label works with bands from around the world but mainly in the US. Their selling coverage is also worldwide.

== Artists ==
- Anacrusis (US)
- Blazon Stone (Sweden)
- Blood Curse (US)
- Captain Trips (Australia)
- Claymorean (Serbia)
- Cloven Altar (US)
- DarkBlack (US)
- Deadlyforce (Portugal)
- Diamond Plate (US)
- Fallen Order (New Zealand)
- Fischel's Beast (US)
- Forgotten Legacy (US)
- Grave Cross (Mexico)
- Hessian (US)
- Leather Heart (Spain)
- Narval (Puerto Rico)
- Owl (US)
- Rocka Rollas (Sweden)
- Sacred Guardian (Puerto Rico)
- Steel Aggressor (US)
- Sylent Storm (US)
- Skull & Bones (Argentina)
- Terminus (United Kingdom)
- Timeless Haunt (US)
- Outer Limits (Japan)
- Wolfshead (Finland)
