= Skull & Bones (band) =

Argentinian power metal band

- Origin: Buenos Aires, Argentina
- Genres: Power metal, Folk metal, Pirate metal
- Years active: 2011−present
- Label: Stormspell Records
- Members: Franco Tempesta; Tomás Vega; Alan Puyol; Fernando Bonino; Franco Schiavone
- Website: www.skullandbonespirates.com

Skull & Bones is an Argentinian power metal band from Buenos Aires. The band takes on themes based on the Golden Age of Piracy, with references from both real historical characters of the period as well as fiction from the genre. They were formed in 2011 playing demos centered on piratical themes, and subsequently released their debut album The Cursed Island in 2014. They signed with Stormspell Records in June 2014.

== The Cursed Island ==
The Cursed Island was independently released on February 1, 2014. Lyrically, it is based upon Robert Louis Stevenson's classic pirate novel Treasure Island. It was recorded at Virtual Studio in Buenos Aires, Argentina and produced by the band themselves along with Nicolás Rodriguez.

The album garnered some attention and favorable reviews, praising the uniqueness and the production of the album. Other, more critical, reviewers noted Skull & Bones' style as "limited" and based on clichées.

On June 24, 2014, the band announced that they had signed with Stormspell Records who would release its own edition of the album. A music video for the song "The Chest Of Billy Bones" was released on YouTube on September 21, 2014.

Track list

All tracks are written by Franco Tempesta, Tomás Vega & Alan Puyol, all lyrics written by Franco Tempesta.

No.	Title	Length
1.	"Admiral Benbow Inn" (Instrumental)	1:56
2.	"The Chest of Billy Bones"	3:43
3.	"The Hispaniola" (Instrumental)	1:27
4.	"Ready for Quest"	2:56
5.	"Set Sail!" (Instrumental)	1:51
6.	"Rum for the Crew"	5:24
7.	"Anthem for the Buccaneer" (Instrumental)	0:50
8.	"Long John Silver"	4:35
9.	"Skeleton Island" (Instrumental)	0:57
10.	"Powder & Guns"	3:21
11.	"Death & Treasure"	3:44
12.	"Treachery March"	3:51
13.	"Captain Flint's Booty"	4:11
Total length:		38:46

== Members ==
Current members

- Franco Tempesta – lead vocals (2011−present)
- Tomás Vega – guitars and backing vocals (2011−present)
- Alan Puyol – keyboards, orchestration and flutes (2011−present)
- Fernando Bonino – drums (2011−present)
- Franco Schiavone - bass and backing vocals (2011–present)

Guest musicians

- Santiago Molina - bagpipes (2014)
- Agustín Santangelo - backing vocals (2014)
