= Death Metal (split album) =

1984 split album by Helloween, Hellhammer, Running Wild, and Dark Avenger

Compilation album by Helloween, Hellhammer, Running Wild, and Dark Avenger
- Released: May 1984
- Recorded: February–March 1984 at Caet Studio, Berlin
- Genre: Heavy metal; speed metal; thrash metal; power metal; black metal
- Length: 32:29
- Label: Noise

Professional ratings
Review scores
Source	Rating
Rock Hard	7.5/10

Death Metal is a 1984 split album by the heavy metal bands Helloween, Hellhammer, Running Wild, and Dark Avenger. It contains the only recorded material by the German group Dark Avenger besides their 1985 demo tape. Despite its name, the musical style is not actually death metal.

The album offers a snapshot of the Central European metal scene during the end of the early 1980s. At that time, Running Wild were still in their "satanic" lyrical phase and had yet to develop their "pirate metal" focus. Helloween had more of a thrash or speed metal sound compared to the more melodic power metal style they would soon develop. Hellhammer were the darkest and heaviest band of the foursome and would later evolve into the group Celtic Frost.

Running Wild's songs appear as Japanese bonus tracks on their 1995 album, Masquerade; Helloween's tracks appear on the second disc of the 2006 remastered and expanded edition of their 1985 album, Walls of Jericho; and Hellhammer's tracks appear on the 1990 re-issue of their 1984 EP, Apocalyptic Raids.

== Track listing ==
Running Wild
No.	Title	Length
1.	"Iron Heads"	3:38
2.	"Bones to Ashes"	5:07

Hellhammer
No.	Title	Length
3.	"Revelations of Doom"	2:46
4.	"Messiah"	4:30

Dark Avenger
No.	Title	Length
5.	"Black Fairies"	3:33
6.	"Lords of the Night"	3:47

Helloween
No.	Title	Length
7.	"Oernst of Life"	4:41
8.	"Metal Invaders"	4:27

== Credits ==
Running Wild

- Rock 'n' Rolf Kasparek – vocals, guitars
- Gerald "Preacher" Warnecke – guitars
- Stephan Boriss – bass
- Wolfgang "Hasche" Hagemann – drums

Hellhammer

- Tom "Satanic Slaughter" Warrior – vocals, guitars
- Martin "Slayed Necros" Ain – bass
- Bruce "Denial Fiend" Day – drums

Dark Avenger

- Siegfried Kohmann – vocals
- Bernd Piontek – guitars
- Claus Johannson – guitars
- Uwe Neff – bass
- Andreas Breindl – drums

Helloween

- Kai Hansen – vocals, guitars
- Michael Weikath – guitars
- Markus Grosskopf – bass
- Ingo Schwichtenberg – drums
