= Blazon Stone =

Studio album by Running Wild
- Released: 4 April 1991
- Recorded: December 1990 – January 1991
- Studio: Studio M, Hanover
- Genre: Heavy metal, power metal
- Length: 49:27
- Label: Noise
- Producer: Rolf Kasparek, Karl-Ulrich Walterbach

Running Wild chronology
Death or Glory (1989)	Blazon Stone (1991)	The First Years of Piracy (1991)

Singles from Blazon Stone
- 1. "Little Big Horn" Released: 28 February 1991

Professional ratings
Review scores
Source	Rating
AllMusic	2.5/5 stars
Collector's Guide to Heavy Metal	7/10
Rock Hard	9.0/10

Blazon Stone is the sixth album by German heavy metal band Running Wild, released in 1991. According to Rolf Kasparek in an interview to a Brazilian heavy metal/hard rock magazine (Roadie Crew, ed. #41, June 2002), Blazon Stone is the best-selling album by the band, in the 1990s. It is also their first album with both guitarist Axel Morgan and drummer AC.

== Track listing ==
All tracks written by Rolf Kasparek except where noted

Side A
No.	Title	Writer(s)	Length
1.	"Blazon Stone"		6:30
2.	"Lonewolf"		4:49
3.	"Slavery"		5:15
4.	"Fire & Ice"	AC	4:09
5.	"Little Big Horn"		5:00

Side B
No.	Title	Writer(s)	Length
6.	"White Masque"		4:17
7.	"Rolling Wheels"	Becker	5:33
8.	"Bloody Red Rose"		5:06
9.	"Straight to Hell"	Becker	3:50
10.	"Heads or Tails"		4:58
Total length:			49:27

CD bonus tracks
No.	Title	Writer(s)	Length
11.	"Over the Rainbow" (instrumental)	Becker	1:55
12.	"Billy the Kid"	Kasparek, Dreffein	4:47
13.	"Genocide (The Killing of the Buffalo)" (Thin Lizzy cover)	Phil Lynott	4:47
Total length:			60:56

1995 bonus track
No.	Title	Length
14.	"Dancing on a Minefield"	4:59
Total length:		65:55

== Notes ==
- 1st press CD release and Polish pressings features the three bonus tracks "Over the Rainbow", "Billy the Kid" and a cover version of the Thin Lizzy song "Genocide". Later CD releases feature one or two bonus tracks
- The 1995 re-release includes the song "Dancing on a Minefield", which is also featured as a bonus track on the 1994 album Black Hand Inn
- The 2017 remastered release features all bonus tracks (excluding "Dancing on a Minefield"), plus the 2003 re-recorded versions of "Blazon Stone" and "Little Big Horn"

== Personnel ==
- Rolf Kasparek – vocals, guitar
- Axel Morgan – guitars
- Jens Becker – bass
- Rüdiger "AC" Dreffein – drums

Additional Musicians

- Kalle Bösel – backing vocals
- Jan Olav, Martina Wiegendt, Sven Pöschmann, Michael Herwig, Jens Butterwick, Raymond Kana, Oliver Losshagen and Ladislav Křížek – backing vocals on "Little Big Horn" and "Heads or Tails"

Production

- Jan Němec – engineer, mixing
- Karl-Ulrich Walterbach – executive producer
- Thorsten Herbig – photography
- Rock 'n' Rolf – producer
- Andreas Marschall – pover art (front and back covers)
- Horst Herrndorff – pover art (back cover)

== Charts ==
Chart (1991)	Peak position
Finnish Albums (The Official Finnish Charts)	24
German Albums (Offizielle Top 100)	22
Swiss Albums (Schweizer Hitparade)	16
