= Rumahoy =

Scottish pirate-themed heavy metal band

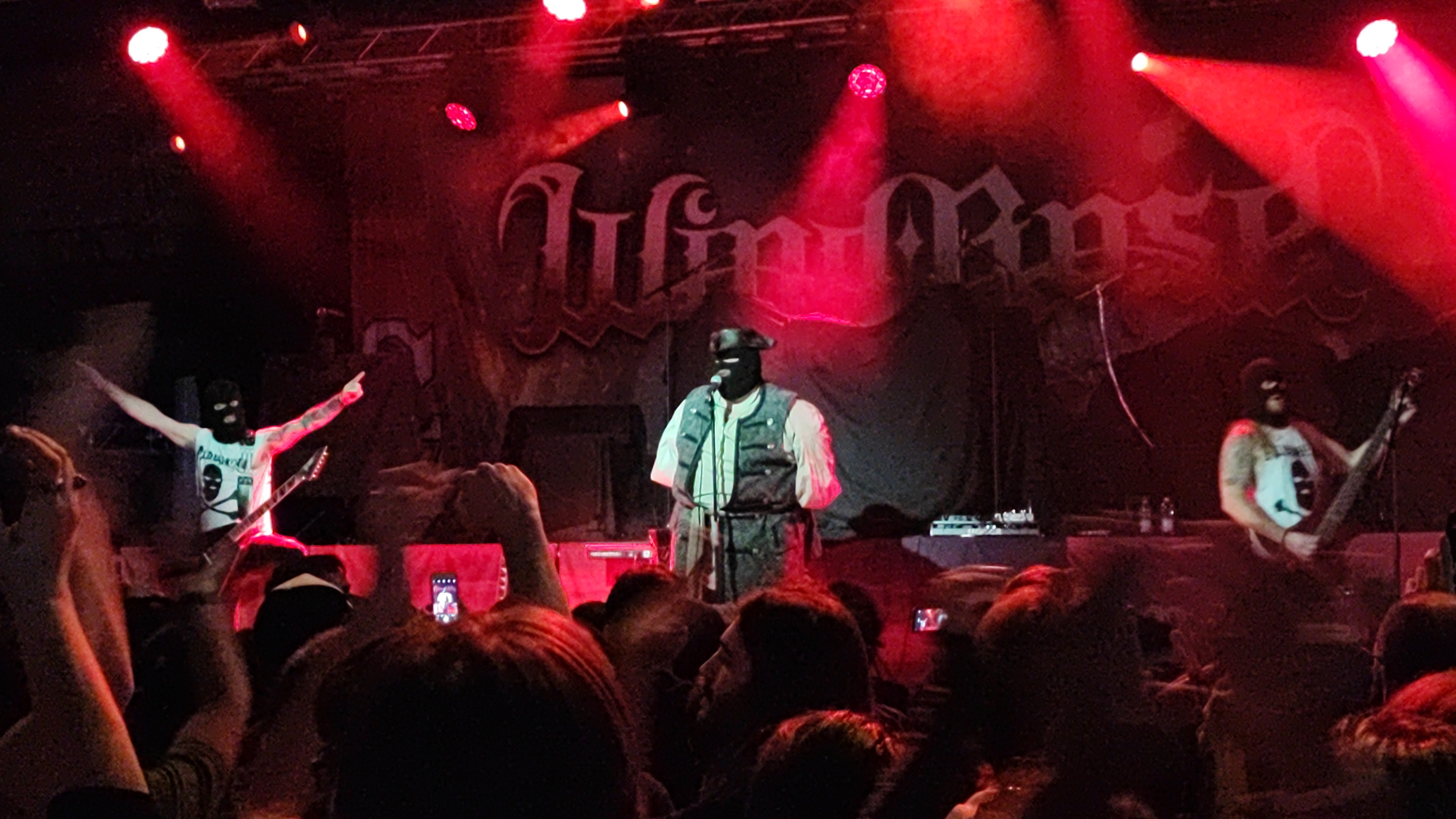
- Rumahoy in 2023

Background information
- Origin: Auchtermuchty, Scotland
- Genres: Pirate metal; folk metal; power metal
- Years active: 2011–present
- Label: Napalm
- Members: Captain Yarrface; Bootsman Walktheplank; Swashbuckling Pete; Cabin Boy Treasurequest

Rumahoy are a Scottish heavy metal band formed in Auchtermuchty in 2011. They are currently based in Ocracoke, North Carolina and signed to Napalm Records. Since its formation, the band has released two studio albums and one single.

== History ==
Rumahoy was formed in Auchtermuchty, Scotland in 2011. They are associated with the band Alestorm, with whom they frequently perform. Christopher Bowes even co-wrote several of their songs. In February 2018, the band released their debut album, The Triumph of Piracy. Shortly afterward, they released their second studio album, Time II: Party in October 2019. In the meantime, they packed their bags and moved to Ocracoke, North Carolina.

== Musical style ==
Rumahoy plays a musical style that blends elements of pirate metal, folk metal, and power metal. Their lyrics and stage presence are entirely dedicated to pirate themes. Aside from their music, Rumahoy's defining element is their visual style and stage presence. The band members wear balaclavas and pirate costumes. They are known for their ability to blend heavy metal with the lightness and humor of pirate themes.

== Band members ==
- Captain Yarrface – vocals (2011–present)
- Bootsman Walktheplank – guitar (2011–present)
- Swashbuckling Pete – drums (2011–present)
- Cabin Boy Treasurequest – bass guitar (2011–present)

== Discography ==
=== Demos ===
- Yarr Demo 2012 (2012)

=== Compilation albums ===
- Heritage Tales: The Very Best of Rumahoy (2013)

=== Studio albums ===
- The Triumph of Piracy (2018)
- Time II: Party (2019)

=== Singles ===
- Not Looking for Love (2022)
