= Leather Heart =

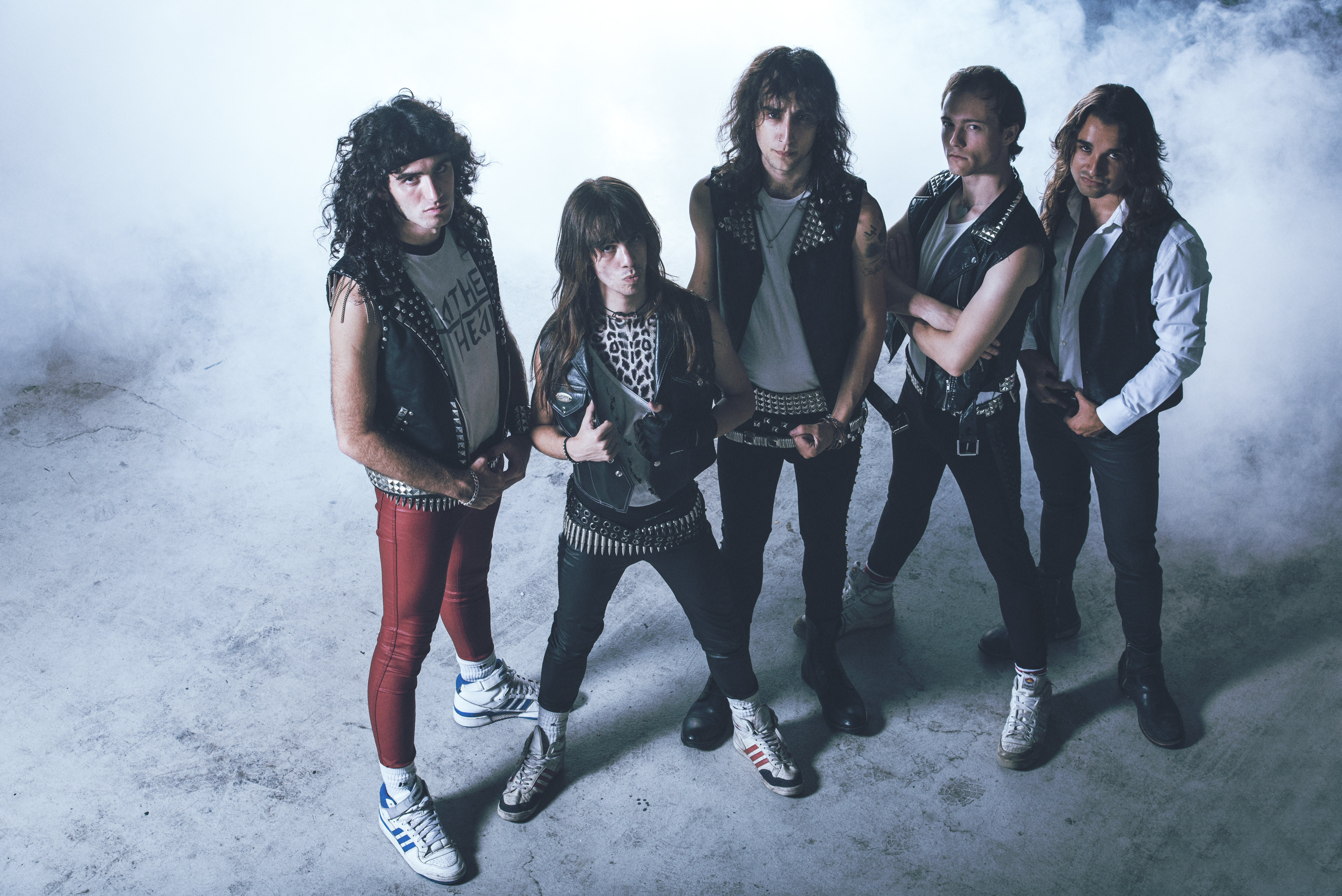
- Left to right: Alejandro Gabasa, Manuel Rueda, Adrian Gonzalez, Jorge Piñero, Sergi Alvarado

Background information
- Origin: Madrid, Spain.
- Genres: Heavy metal, Hard rock, Traditional heavy metal
- Years active: 2009-present
- Labels: es:The Fish Factory Music; Stormspell Records (USA); Diabolic Might Records (GER); Spiritual Beast (JAP)
- Website: leatherheartband.com

Leather Heart is a Spanish heavy metal/hard rock band from Madrid, Spain, founded in 2009.

== History ==
Leather Heart was founded in 2009 in Alameda de Osuna, Madrid (Spain) when all the members were underage. The band has two albums, an EP from 2014 of five songs and a LP, which was funded by a successful crowdfunding, from 2015 called Comeback of 10 songs, including a Black Sabbath cover. The EP was edited in Spain and Europe by the record labels Metal Crusaders and Iberia Metallica, the long play was edited worldwide by The Fish Factory, (Spain and Europe) and Stormspell Records (United States and South America), in CD format, and in vinyl by Diabolic Might Records from Germany. The album was lately re-edited in 2017 in China, Korea and Japan by Spiritual Beast Records with a Japanese artwork.

They are known for their youthfulness compared with their career and for a style based in an organic sound like the classic heavy metal from the 1980s. Leather Heart's Comeback sold more than 1500 copies the very first months and it was rated by the Spanish heavy/rock media as one of the best Spanish albums of 2015, as well as between the best 50 Spanish/Latin American metal albums of 2015, although the main language of the band is English.

Leather Heart is considered part of the new wave of traditional heavy metal or traditional metal scene for their sound and lyrics, and for their heavy-style appearance and their albums' art work.

== Current members ==
- Adrian Gonzalez - Vocals
- Alejandro Gabasa - Guitars
- Jorge Piñero - Guitars
- Sergio Alvarado - Bass guitar
- Manuel Rueda - Drums

== Discography ==
- 2014: Leather Heart (EP)
  - Nightmares town (videoclip)
  - Don't you go (live studio recording)
- 2015: Comeback (LP)
  - Depth's of space (videoclip)

== See also ==
- Heavy metal fashion
