= Shadowmaker (Running Wild album) =

Studio album by Running Wild
- Released: 20 April 2012
- Genre: Heavy metal, power metal
- Label: Steamhammer Records
- Producer: Rolf Kasparek

Running Wild chronology
| Rogues en Vogue (2005) | Shadowmaker (2012) | Resilient (2013) |

Professional ratings
Review scores
| Source | Rating |
|---|---|
| Metal Underground | 4/5 stars |
| Dangerdog | 3.5/5 stars |
| Rock Hard | 6.0/10 |

Shadowmaker is the fourteenth studio album by German heavy metal band Running Wild, released on 20 April 2012. It is the band's first studio album since 2005's Rogues en Vogue and the first since the band's return after breaking up in 2009.

== Background ==
Since the band's return to the scene, Rolf wrote 10 new tracks for Shadowmaker, among them are the midtempo opener "Piece of the Action", the uptempo number "Shadowmaker" (roughly the same pace as "Angel of Mercy" from Rogues en Vogue) and the monumental eight-minute track "Dracula", based on Bram Stoker's novel and the Christopher Lee movies. In an interview, he talks about the album:

"To me, Shadowmaker is a very special album because there was no pressure, time wise or otherwise. I feel it's clearly audible that this relaxed attitude helped me to write one of the strongest Running Wild recordings of all time."

== Songs ==
"Me & the Boys" was originally composed for Rolf Kasparek's side project Toxic Taste.

== Track listing ==
All songs written and composed by Rolf Kasparek.

| No. | Title | Length |
|---|---|---|
| 1. | "Piece of the Action" | 4:25 |
| 2. | "Riding on the Tide" | 4:18 |
| 3. | "I Am Who I Am" | 4:51 |
| 4. | "Black Shadow" | 5:13 |
| 5. | "Locomotive" | 4:35 |
| 6. | "Me & the Boys" | 5:00 |
| 7. | "Shadowmaker" | 4:25 |
| 8. | "Sailing Fire" | 4:15 |
| 9. | "Into the Black" | 4:57 |
| 10. | "Dracula" | 7:29 |
| Total length: | | 49:27 |

== Release ==
- The slipcase release contains a DVD with a track-by-track commentary session by Rolf Kasparek
- The 2x limited edition 12" vinyl release (showing the album cover with a dark silver coloured image than the original shown above) comes with the original CD, a DVD in a black jewel case containing the above features and also includes a postcard, stickers, a poster and a 30-page LP format book with the history of the band packaged in a cardboard box, limited to 1,000 copies worldwide

== Personnel ==
- Rock 'n' Rolf – vocals, guitars
- Peter Jordan – lead guitar, vocals (choirs)
- (The bass and drums were recorded by anonymous guests that did not want to be identified.)

Production

- Jens Reinhold – cover art, artwork
- Niki Nowy – engineering, mastering
- Peter Jordan – engineering
- Rock 'n' Rolf – producer
- Katharina Nowy – additional producing
- Markus "Max" Chemnitz – photography

== Charts ==
| Chart (2012) | Peak position |
|---|---|
| Austrian Albums (Ö3 Austria) | 63 |
| German Albums (Offizielle Top 100) | 12 |
| Swedish Albums (Sverigetopplistan) | 43 |
