= Pile of Skulls =

Studio album by Running Wild
- Released: 21 October 1992
- Recorded: June – August 1992
- Studios: Studio M, Hannover, Germany
- Genres: Heavy metal, power metal
- Length: 50:35
- Label: Electrola
- Producers: Rolf Kasparek, Karl-Ulrich Walterbach

Running Wild chronology
The First Years of Piracy (1991)	Pile of Skulls (1992)	Black Hand Inn (1994)

Singles from Pile of Skulls
- 1. "Lead or Gold" Released: 7 September 1992

Pile of Skulls is the seventh studio album by Running Wild, released in 1992. It is their last album with guitarist Axel Morgan.

The song "Jennings' Revenge" tells about the exploits of pirate Henry Jennings.

The lyrics of "Treasure Island" are based on the book of the same title by 19th century author Robert Louis Stevenson.

== Critical reception ==
Professional ratings
Review scores
Source	Rating
AllMusic	4/5 stars
Collector's Guide to Heavy Metal	7/10
Rock Hard	9.0/10

Pile of Skulls was met with mostly positive reviews from critics. Steve Huey of All Music Guide called it one of Running Wild's strongest efforts. While calling it too ambitious, he thought Pile of Skulls combined the group's trademark pirate subject matter with a unifying concept about corruption and abuse of power throughout history.

In a 2013 interview, Rolf Kasparek spoke about the song "Bloody Island" from the 2013 album Resilient and explained that the demo version of the song would've been a great fit on the album.

== Track listing ==
Music and lyrics written by Rolf Kasparek, except "Pile of Skulls" by Kasparek and Axel Morgan and "Win or Be Drowned" by Kasparek and Piotr Smuszynski.

Side A
No.	Title	Length
1.	"Whirlwind"	4:52
2.	"Sinister Eyes"	5:06
3.	"Black Wings of Death"	5:17
4.	"Fistful of Dynamite"	4:06
5.	"Roaring Thunder"	5:56

Side B
No.	Title	Length
6.	"Pile of Skulls"	4:39
7.	"Lead or Gold"	5:06
8.	"Jennings' Revenge"	4:17
9.	"Treasure Island"	11:14
Total length:		50:35

CD Edition
No.	Title	Length
1.	"Chamber of Lies" (Intro)	2:21
2.	"Whirlwind"	4:52
3.	"Sinister Eyes"	5:06
4.	"Black Wings of Death"	5:17
5.	"Fistful of Dynamite"	4:06
6.	"Roaring Thunder"	5:56
7.	"Pile of Skulls"	4:39
8.	"Lead or Gold"	5:06
9.	"White Buffalo"	5:17
10.	"Jennings' Revenge"	4:17
11.	"Treasure Island"	11:14
Total length:		58:13

Japanese CD Bonus Track
No.	Title	Length
12.	"Beggar's Night '92"	5:00
Total length:		63:13

1999 Bonus Tracks
No.	Title	Length
13.	"Hanged, Drawn and Quartered"	4:38
14.	"Win or Be Drowned"	4:17
15.	"Uaschitschun '92"	4:53
Total length:		67:02

The 2017 Remastered version contains a second disc, featuring the following songs

No.	Title	Length
1.	"Beggars' Night" (1992 Alternate version)	5:01
2.	"Hanged, Drawn and Quartered" (From the Lead or Gold EP)	4:38
3.	"Win or Be Drowned" (From the Lead or Gold EP)	4:17
4.	"Uaschitschum '92" (1992 Updated version)	4:53
5.	"Whirlwind" (2003 Re-recorded version)	4:54
6.	"Treasure Island" (2003 Re-recorded version)	11:16

== Personnel ==
- Rolf Kasparek – vocals, guitar
- Axel Morgan – guitar
- Thomas Smuszynski – bass
- Stefan Schwarzmann – drums

Additional Musician

- Ralf Nowy – keyboards on "Chamber of Lies", effects on "Sinister Eyes"

Production

- Jan Němec – engineer, mixing
- Thomas Körge – engineer
- Karl-U. Walterbach – executive producer
- Rock 'n' Rolf – producer
- Andreas Marschall – cover art

== Charts ==
Chart (1992)	Peak position
German Albums (Offizielle Top 100)	54
