= Rogues en Vogue =

Studio album by Running Wild
- Released: 21 February 2005
- Recorded: 2004
- Genre: Heavy metal, power metal
- Label: GUN Records
- Producer: Running Wild

Running Wild chronology
Live (2002)	Rogues en Vogue (2005)	Shadowmaker (2012)

Rogues en Vogue is the thirteenth studio album by German heavy metal band Running Wild, released in 2005.

== Track listing ==
All songs written by Rolf Kasparek

No.	Title	Length
1.	"Draw the Line"	4:11
2.	"Angel of Mercy"	4:44
3.	"Skeleton Dance"	4:25
4.	"Skull & Bones"	6:23
5.	"Born Bad, Dying Worse"	4:17
6.	"Black Gold"	4:16
7.	"Soul Vampires"	3:53
8.	"Rogues en Vogue"	4:45
9.	"Winged & Feathered"	5:14
10.	"Dead Man's Road"	3:34
11.	"The War"	10:38
Total length:		56:20

Limited edition bonus tracks
No.	Title	Length
1.	"Cannonball Tongue"	4:01
2.	"Libertalia"	3:47
Total length:		64:08

== Personnel ==
- Rolf Kasparek – vocals, all guitars, some bass
- Peter Pichl – bass
- Mattias Liebetruth – drums

=== Production ===
- Peter Pichl – engineering (bass)
- Katharina Nowy – producer (additional)
- Matthias Liebetruth – engineering (drums)
- Niki Nowy – engineering (vocals), mixing (vocals)
- Rolf Kasparek – producer, engineering, mixing, music, lyrics
- Rainer Holst – mastering
- Rudolf Wintzer – cover art

== Charts ==
Chart (2005)	Peak position
German Albums (Offizielle Top 100)	39
Swedish Albums (Sverigetopplistan)	49
