= Masquerade (Running Wild album) =

Studio album by Running Wild
- Released: 30 October 1995
- Recorded: July–August 1995
- Studio: Horus-Sound-Studio, Hannover, Germany
- Genre: Heavy metal, power metal
- Length: 50:49
- Label: Noise
- Producer: Rolf Kasparek, Karl-Ulrich Walterbach

Running Wild chronology
Black Hand Inn (1994)	Masquerade (1995)	The Rivalry (1998)

Professional ratings
Review scores
Source	Rating
Collector's Guide to Heavy Metal	6/10
Rock Hard	9.0/10

Masquerade is the ninth album by German band Running Wild. It is the first in a trilogy of a theme of good versus evil, continued with The Rivalry and concluded with Victory.

== Track listing ==
All tracks written by Rolf Kasparek except where noted

Side A
No.	Title	Length
1.	"The Contract / The Crypts of Hades"	2:20
2.	"Masquerade"	4:20
3.	"Demonized"	4:41
4.	"Black Soul"	5:18
5.	"Lions of the Sea"	5:49
6.	"Rebel at Heart"	5:45

Side B
No.	Title	Length
7.	"Wheel of Doom"	4:02
8.	"Metalhead"	4:56
9.	"Soleil Royal"	4:44
10.	"Men in Black"	4:35
11.	"Underworld"	6:19
Total length:		50:49

Japanese bonus tracks
No.	Title	Writer(s)	Length
1.	"Iron Heads" (From the Death Metal compilation album)	Kasparek, Warnecke	3:45
2.	"Bones to Ashes" (From the Death Metal compilation album)		5:17
Total length:			61:51

2017 Remastered Edition bonus tracks
No.	Title	Length
1.	"Lions of the Sea" (2003 Re-recorded version)	3:45
2.	"Black Soul" (2003 Re-recorded version)	5:17
Total length:		61:51

== Release ==
Two different limited edition releases exist; a wooden box containing a poster and a big box treasure chest that comes with the Death or Glory Tour - Live VHS, the adrian bandana, a 26-page booklet and the original album

== Personnel ==
- Rolf Kasparek – vocals, guitar
- Thilo Hermann – guitars
- Thomas Smuszynski – bass guitar
- Jörg Michael – drums

Additional musician

- Ralf Nowy – effects on "The Contract / The Crypts of Hades" and "Underworld"

Production

- Rock 'n' Rolf – producer
- Karl-Ulrich Walterbach – executive producer
- Gerhard Woelfe – engineer, mixing
- Marisa Jacobi – layout, typography
- Andreas Marschall – cover art

== Charts ==
Chart (1995)	Peak position
German Albums (Offizielle Top 100)	54
