= Branded and Exiled =

Studio album by Running Wild
- Released: 1985
- Recorded: 1985
- Studio: Casablanca Studios, Berlin
- Genre: Speed metal, heavy metal
- Length: 35:45
- Label: Noise (Germany); Combat (US)
- Producer: Running Wild and Horst Müller

Running Wild chronology
| Gates to Purgatory (1984) | Branded and Exiled (1985) | Under Jolly Roger (1987) |

Professional ratings
Review scores
| Source | Rating |
|---|---|
| AllMusic | 3/5 stars |
| Collector's Guide to Heavy Metal | 5/10 |
| Rock Hard | 8.0/10 |

Branded and Exiled is the second studio album by German heavy metal band Running Wild, released in 1985.

== Track listing ==
All music and lyrics by Rolf Kasparek except where noted

Side A
| No. | Title | Writer(s) | Length |
|---|---|---|---|
| 1. | "Branded and Exiled" | | 3:54 |
| 2. | "Gods of Iron" | | 4:00 |
| 3. | "Realm of Shades" | Kasparek, Stephan Boriss | 4:28 |
| 4. | "Mordor" | | 4:49 |

Side B
| No. | Title | Writer(s) | Length |
|---|---|---|---|
| 5. | "Fight the Oppression" | | 4:55 |
| 6. | "Evil Spirit" | Boriss | 3:19 |
| 7. | "Marching to Die" | | 4:35 |
| 8. | "Chains and Leather" | | 5:45 |
| Total length: | | | 35:45 |

2017 remastered edition bonus tracks
| No. | Title | Length |
|---|---|---|
| 1. | "Branded and Exiled" (1991 re-recorded version) | 3:50 |
| 2. | "Fight the Oppression" (1991 re-recorded version) | 4:53 |
| 3. | "Marching to Die" (1991 re-recorded version) | 4:37 |
| 4. | "Branded and Exiled" (2003 re-recorded version) | 3:54 |
| 5. | "Mordor" (2003 re-recorded version) | 4:49 |
| Total length: | | 57:48 |

== Note ==
- Some CD versions feature a different version of "Chains and Leather" with notably different vocals

== Personnel ==
- Rolf Kasparek – guitar, vocals
- Michael Kupper – guitars, backing vocals
- Stephan Boriss – bass, backing vocals
- Wolfgang Hagemann – drums, backing vocals

Production

- Horst Müller – co-producer, recording, mixing
- Karl-U. Walterbach – executive producer
- Thomas Stiegler – mixing
- Running Wild – artwork
- D. Magnussen – photography
- Thotsten Hanl – management
