= Ready for Boarding =

Live album by Running Wild
- Released: 22 February 1988
- Recorded: 9–10 November 1987
- Venue: Munich, Germany
- Genre: Speed metal, heavy metal
- Length: 42:48
- Label: Noise

Running Wild chronology
| Under Jolly Roger (1987) | Ready for Boarding (1988) | Port Royal (1988) |

Professional ratings
Review scores
| Source | Rating |
|---|---|
| Collector's Guide to Heavy Metal | 6/10 |
| Ever Metal | 9/10 |

Ready for Boarding is a live album by German heavy metal band Running Wild. It was recorded at a concert in Munich. The song "Purgatory" has never been recorded for a studio album and is dedicated to the Parents Music Resource Center.

In 2022, the album was re-issued along with The First Years of Piracy.

== Track listing ==
Side A – Running Side
| No. | Title | Length |
|---|---|---|
| 1. | "Hymn of Long John Silver" (Intro) | 2:36 |
| 2. | "Under Jolly Roger" | 4:17 |
| 3. | "Genghis Khan" | 4:15 |
| 4. | "Raise Your Fist" | 5:16 |
| 5. | "Purgatory" | 5:35 |

Side B – Wild Side
| No. | Title | Length |
|---|---|---|
| 6. | "Mordor" | 4:24 |
| 7. | "Diabolic Force" | 4:38 |
| 8. | "Raw Ride" | 4:38 |
| 9. | "Adrian (S.O.S.)" | 2:35 |
| 10. | "Prisoner of Our Time" | 4:34 |
| Total length: | | 42:48 |

== Personnel ==
- Rolf Kasparek – guitar, vocals
- Majk Moti – guitar, backing vocals
- Jens Becker – bass, backing vocals
- Stefan Schwarzmann – drums

Production

- Irene Vögeli – photography

== Charts ==
2022 chart performance for Ready for Boarding
| Chart (2022) | Peak position |
|---|---|
| German Albums (Offizielle Top 100) | 54 |
