= The Brotherhood (Running Wild album) =

Studio album by Running Wild
- Released: 25 February 2002
- Recorded: July–November 2001
- Genre: Heavy metal, power metal
- Length: 64:20
- Label: GUN/BMG

Running Wild chronology
Victory (2000)	The Brotherhood (2002)	Live (2002)

Professional ratings
Review scores
Source	Rating
Rock Hard	6.0/10
Laut.de	2/5

The Brotherhood is the twelfth studio album by German heavy metal band Running Wild.

A live/video album, titled Live, was released in 2002 that was filmed during the supporting tour for The Brotherhood.

== Songs ==
"The Ghost" is about Thomas Edward Lawrence, who was a British liaison officer during the Arab Revolt of 1916 to 1918.

== Track listing ==
All songs written by Rolf Kasparek.

No.	Title	Length
1.	"Welcome to Hell"	4:34
2.	"Soulstrippers"	4:48
3.	"The Brotherhood"	6:49
4.	"Crossfire"	4:26
5.	"Siberian Winter" (Instrumental)	6:27
6.	"Detonator"	3:51
7.	"Pirate Song"	3:17
8.	"Unation"	5:48
9.	"Dr. Horror"	4:53
10.	"The Ghost"	10:23
Total length:		55:16

Limited edition bonus tracks
No.	Title	Length
1.	"Powerride"	4:26
2.	"Faceless"	4:27
Total length:		64:09

== Personnel ==
- Rolf Kasparek – vocals, guitars
- Peter Pichl – bass guitar
- Angelo Sasso – drums

Additional musicians

- Ralf Nowy – backing vocals on "Pirate Song" and "Unation"
- Oni Logan – vocals on "Doctor Horror"

Production

- Gerhard Woelfe – engineering (vocals), mixing (vocals)
- Rainer Holst – mastering
- Katharina Nowy – producer (additional), engineering, mixing
- Ralf Nowy – engineering, mixing
- Ralf Steiner – photography
- Gabi Steiner – photography
- Rolf Kasparek – producer, engineering, mixing

== Charts ==
Chart (2002)	Peak position
German Albums (Offizielle Top 100)	23
