= Victory (Running Wild album) =

Studio album by Running Wild
- Released: 10 January 2000
- Recorded: 1999
- Genres: Heavy metal, power metal
- Length: 55:20
- Label: GUN Records

Running Wild chronology
The Rivalry (1998)	Victory (2000)	The Brotherhood (2002)

Singles from Victory
- 1. "Revolution" Released: 2000

Professional ratings
Review scores
Source	Rating
Rock Hard	8.5/10

Victory is the eleventh studio album by German heavy metal band Running Wild. It is the third and final album in a trilogy of a theme of good versus evil, started with Masquerade and continued with The Rivalry.

== Songs ==
"Tsar" is about the Russian Emperor Nikolai II.

== Track listing ==
All tracks written by Rolf Kasparek, except where noted.

No.	Title	Writer(s)	Length
1.	"Fall of Dorkas"		5:16
2.	"When Time Runs Out"		5:17
3.	"Timeriders"		4:24
4.	"Into the Fire"		4:57
5.	"Revolution" (The Beatles cover)	John Lennon, Paul McCartney	2:59
6.	"The Final Waltz" (instrumental)	Hermann	1:19
7.	"Tsar"		7:08
8.	"The Hussar"		4:05
9.	"The Guardian"		5:09
10.	"Return of the Gods"	Kasparek, Hermann	5:31
11.	"Silent Killer"		4:44
12.	"Victory"		4:49
Total length:			55:39

== Personnel ==
- Rolf Kasparek – vocals, guitar
- Thilo Hermann – guitars
- Thomas Smuszynski – bass guitar
- Angelo Sasso – drums

Additional musicians

- Ralf Nowy – keyboards on "The Final Waltz"
- Matthias Liebetruth – hi-hat overdubs

Production

- Gerhard Woelfe – mixing
- Thorsten Herbig – photography
- Rock 'n' Rolf – producer
- Peter Dell – artwork, layout
- Rainer Holst – mastering
- Katharina Nowy – producer (additional)

== Charts ==
Chart (2000)	Peak position
German Albums (Offizielle Top 100)	26
Swedish Albums (Sverigetopplistan)	52
