= Rapid Foray =

Studio album by Running Wild
- Released: 26 August 2016
- Recorded: 2016
- Genres: Heavy metal, power metal
- Label: Steamhammer Records
- Producer: Rolf Kasparek

Running Wild chronology
Resilient (2013)	Rapid Foray (2016)	Blood on Blood (2021)

Rapid Foray is the sixteenth studio album by the German heavy metal band Running Wild. It was released by Steamhammer Records on 26 August 2016. The album release was delayed due to Rolf Kasparek's shoulder injury, and their subsequent show at Wacken in 2015. A lyric video was made for "Black Bart".

== Recordings ==
According to Kasparek, he recorded the vocals and guitars at his personal studio while Peter Jordan recorded guitar solos, drums and choruses. Three studios were involved in the recording process. He also mentioned that only three musicians took part on the album

== Release ==
An enhanced limited edition digipak edition, available only on the EMP.de website, includes a double-sided poster and an exclusive Running Wild compass.

== Reception ==
Professional ratings
Review scores
Source	Rating
Blabbermouth	8/10
Brave Words & Bloody Knuckles	9.0/10
Rock Hard	8.0/10
Metal Hammer	5/7

New Noise Magazine called it a "full length full of sweet speed metal riffs, German rhythms, and fun righteous anthems" and said that "the band really does feel as true to the vintage sounds off of their classic material". It gave a rating of five stars.

== Track listing ==
No.	Title	Length
1.	"Black Skies, Red Flag"	4:44
2.	"Warmongers"	4:29
3.	"Stick to Your Guns"	5:08
4.	"Rapid Foray"	4:47
5.	"By the Blood in Your Heart"	5:27
6.	"The Depth of the Sea (Nautilus)" (Instrumental)	3:53
7.	"Black Bart"	5:06
8.	"Hellectrified"	4:22
9.	"Blood Moon Rising"	4:20
10.	"Into the West"	4:34
11.	"Last of the Mohicans"	11:11
Total length:		58:01

== Personnel ==
- Rolf Kasparek – vocals, guitars, bass guitar
- Peter Jordan – guitars

Additional musicians

- Ole Hempelmann – bass guitar
- Michael Wolpers – drums

Production

- Rolf Kasparek – producer
- Niki Nowy – recording
- Peter Jordan – recording
- Michael Wolpers – recording
- Jens Reinhold – artwork, layout

== Charts ==
Chart (2016)	Peak position
Austrian Albums (Ö3 Austria)	35
Belgian Albums (Ultratop Wallonia)	166
German Albums (Offizielle Top 100)	2
Swedish Albums (Sverigetopplistan)	43
Swiss Albums (Schweizer Hitparade)	30
