= Resilient (Running Wild album) =

Studio album by Running Wild
- Released: 4 October 2013
- Recorded: 2013
- Genre: Heavy metal, power metal
- Label: Steamhammer Records
- Producer: Rolf Kasparek

Running Wild chronology
Shadowmaker (2012)	Resilient (2013)	Rapid Foray (2016)

Resilient is the fifteenth studio album by German heavy metal band Running Wild, released on 4 October 2013 via Steamhammer Records.

== Track listing ==
No.	Title	Length
1.	"Soldiers of Fortune"	4:26
2.	"Resilient"	4:42
3.	"Adventure Highway"	4:17
4.	"The Drift"	4:46
5.	"Desert Rose"	5:18
6.	"Fireheart"	4:40
7.	"Run Riot"	4:33
8.	"Down to the Wire"	4:03
9.	"Crystal Gold"	4:27
10.	"Bloody Island"	9:56
Total length:		51:08

Limited and Japanese edition bonus tracks
No.	Title	Length
1.	"Payola & Shenanigans"	4:41
2.	"Premonition"	4:18
Total length:		60:10

== Album information ==
In a 2013 interview, Rolf Kasparek described the album as audibly tougher and more compact than the previous album Shadowmaker. He then went on to talk about the song "Bloody Island" in which he explained that the demo version of the song would have been a great fit on the band's Pile of Skulls album.

A limited edition boxed set, released exclusively on the German Amazon website, features a poster flag, a patch, two posters, two stickers and a photo card.

== Personnel ==
- Rolf Kasparek – vocals, guitars, bass
- Peter Jordan – guitars
- (As with the previous album, the bass and drums were once again recorded by guests that wanted to remain anonymous.)

Production

- Rolf Kasparek – producer
- Niki Nowy – mixing, mastering
- Jens Reinhold – cover art

== Charts ==
Chart (2013)	Peak position
German Albums (Offizielle Top 100)	25
Swedish Albums (Sverigetopplistan)	54
