= The Rivalry (album) =

Studio album by Running Wild
- Released: 9 February 1998
- Recorded: 1997
- Genre: Heavy metal, power metal
- Label: GUN
- Producer: Rolf Kasparek

Running Wild chronology
Masquerade (1995)	The Rivalry (1998)	Victory (2000)

Professional ratings
Review scores
Source	Rating
AllMusic	2/5 stars
Rock Hard	8.5/10

The Rivalry is the tenth album by German heavy metal band Running Wild. It is the second in a trilogy of a theme of good versus evil, which began with Masquerade and concluded with Victory. It is also their last album with drummer Jörg Michael.

== Track listing ==
All songs by written by Rolf Kasparek, except where noted.

Side A
No.	Title	Length
1.	"March of the Final Battle (The End of All Evil)" (Intro)	2:00
2.	"The Rivalry"	5:34
3.	"Kiss of Death"	3:36
4.	"Firebreather"	4:04
5.	"Return of the Dragon"	6:47
6.	"Resurrection"	4:45
7.	"Ballad of William Kidd"	8:43

Side B
No.	Title	Writer(s)	Length
8.	"Agents of Black"		3:57
9.	"Fire & Thunder"		7:33
10.	"The Poison"		4:40
11.	"Adventure Galley"	Kasparek, Hermann	4:20
12.	"Man on the Moon"		4:49
13.	"War & Peace"		7:42
Total length:			68:27

== Note ==
- The limited edition CD release features the album's cover in 3D.

== Personnel ==
- Rolf Kasparek – vocals, guitar
- Thilo Hermann – guitars
- Thomas Smuszynski – bass guitar
- Jörg Michael – drums

=== Production ===
- Peter Lohde – graphic design
- Gerhard Woelfe – engineering, mixing
- Rainer Holst – mastering
- Rock 'n' Rolf – producer
- Andreas Marschall – cover art

== Charts ==
Chart (1998)	Peak position
German Albums (Offizielle Top 100)	19
