= Under Jolly Roger =

Studio album by Running Wild
- Released: 1 April 1987
- Recorded: 1986
- Studios: Soundhouse Studios, Hamburg
- Genres: Heavy metal; pirate metal
- Length: 36:35
- Label: Noise
- Producers: Dirk Steffens; Rolf Kasparek

Running Wild chronology
Branded and Exiled (1985)	Under Jolly Roger (1987)	Ready for Boarding (1988)

Professional ratings
Review scores
Source	Rating
Collector's Guide to Heavy Metal	8/10
Kerrang!	2/5 stars
Rock Hard	5.0/10

Under Jolly Roger is the third album by the German heavy metal band Running Wild. It marked a stylistic turning point in which the group dropped the Satanic imagery they had previously used and adopted the pirate theme they would become known for, creating the pirate metal subgenre of heavy metal in the 2000s in the process. The album's title comes from the famous Jolly Roger, the flag used by pirates to identify their ships.

== Track listing ==
All music written by Rolf Kasparek; all lyrics by Kasparek except where noted

Side A
No.	Title	Length
1.	"Under Jolly Roger"	4:42
2.	"War in the Gutter"	3:19
3.	"Raw Ride"	4:39
4.	"Beggar's Night"	5:05

Side B
No.	Title	Writer(s)	Length
5.	"Raise Your Fist"	Kasparek, Majk Moti	5:30
6.	"Land of Ice"	Kasparek, Moti	4:56
7.	"Diamonds of the Black Chest"		4:39
8.	"Merciless Game"	Moti	3:45
Total length:			36:35

The 2017 remastered version contains a second disc, featuring the following songs

No.	Title	Length
1.	"Under Jolly Roger" (1991 re-recorded version)	4:07
2.	"Raw Ride" (1991 re-recorded version)	4:16
3.	"Raise Your Fist" (1991 re-recorded version)	4:43
4.	"Diamonds of the Black Chest" (1991 re-recorded version)	2:50
5.	"Beggar's Night" (1992 re-recorded version)	5:01
6.	"Apocalyptic Horsemen" (previously unreleased)	4:39
7.	"Under Jolly Roger" (2003 re-recorded version)	4:45
8.	"Raise Your Fist" (2003 re-recorded version)	5:32

== Note ==
- The CD and Japanese cassette version feature a different track listing.

== Personnel ==
- Rolf Kasparek – guitars, vocals
- Majk Moti – guitars
- Stephan Boriss – bass
- Wolfgang "Hasche" Hagemann – drums

Production

- Dirk Steffens – producer
- Ertuğrul Edirne – artwork
- Rock 'n' Rolf – co-producer
