= The First Years of Piracy =

Compilation album by Running Wild
- Released: 11 November 1991
- Recorded: July–August 1991
- Studio: Studio W. Machtsum
- Genre: Heavy metal, power metal
- Length: 42:34
- Label: Noise
- Producer: Rock'n Rolf

Running Wild chronology
Blazon Stone (1991)	The First Years of Piracy (1991)	Pile of Skulls (1992)

Professional ratings
Review scores
Source	Rating
Metal.de	8/10
Rock Hard	9/10

The First Years of Piracy is an album by German heavy metal band Running Wild. It is their last album with both bassist Jens Becker and drummer AC. It contains re-recorded versions of songs from the first three albums.

A promo video was made for this version of "Branded and Exiled".

In 2018, the album was included on a box set titled Pieces of Eight: The Singles, Live and Rare 1984 - 1994. In 2022, the album was re-issued along with Ready for Boarding.

== Critical reception ==
Metal.de reviewed the re-release and compared the re-recordings to the originals and said they are "significantly more homogenous, polished, crisper, and faster [...]". They called the song selection good, although they noted that two important tracks were missing: "Genghis Khan" and "Adrian SOS". Powermetal.de also reviewed the re-release and said the album has "a more venomous, crisp, and contemporary sound. They said the ten tracks are the strongest tracks of the band's early years. In a Pieces of Eight review, Inferno said the album sounds too clean and rushed, and ruins the feel of the originals.

== Track listing ==
Side A – Running
No.	Title	Length
1.	"Under Jolly Roger"	4:04
2.	"Branded and Exiled"	3:50
3.	"Soldiers of Hell"	3:22
4.	"Raise Your Fist"	4:51
5.	"Walpurgis Night"	5:20

Side B – Wild
No.	Title	Length
6.	"Fight the Oppression"	4:53
7.	"Marching to Die"	4:37
8.	"Raw Ride"	4:14
9.	"Diamonds of the Black Chest"	2:49
10.	"Prisoner of Our Time"	4:34
Total length:		42:34

== Personnel ==
- Rolf Kasparek – vocals, guitar, producer
- Axel Morgan – guitars
- Jens Becker – bass guitar
- AC – drums
- Jan Nemec – mixing
