= Live (Running Wild album) =

Live album by Running Wild
- Released: 18 November 2002
- Recorded: 30 March 2002
- Genre: Heavy metal, power metal, speed metal
- Length: 102:23
- Label: GUN Records
- Producer: Rolf Kasparek

Running Wild chronology
The Brotherhood (2002)	Live (2002)	Rogues en Vogue (2005)

Live is a 2002 live album by German heavy metal band Running Wild, released on 18 November. It was recorded live at Halle Gartlage in Osnabrück during their support tour for The Brotherhood. The album was released on CD and DVD.

== Critical reception ==
Powermetal.de praised the production quality and the song selection. The booklet was noted as poorly designed. Overall, the album was called terrific.

== Track listing ==
Disc 1
No.	Title	Length
1.	"March of the Final Battle (The End of All Evil)" (Intro)	2:16
2.	"Welcome to Hell"	4:38
3.	"Bad to the Bone"	5:33
4.	"Lead or Gold"	6:04
5.	"Riding the Storm"	5:15
6.	"When Time Runs Out"	6:07
7.	"The Brotherhood"	7:21
8.	"Soulless"	5:43
9.	"Blazon Stone"	5:21
Total length:		48:18

Disc 2
No.	Title	Length
1.	"Crossfire"	4:58
2.	"Metalmachine Solo"	3:02
3.	"Kiss of Death"	4:15
4.	"Uaschitschun"	5:32
5.	"Unation"	6:20
6.	"Victory"	6:25
7.	"Prisoners of Our Time"	5:10
8.	"Purgatory"	6:23
9.	"Soulstrippers"	5:19
10.	"Under Jolly Roger"	4:41
Total length:		52:05

== Personnel ==
- Rolf Kasparek – vocals, guitar
- Bernd Aufermann – guitar
- Peter Pichl – bass guitar
- Matthias Liebetruth – drums

Production

- Rolf Kasparek – production
- Rainer Holst – mixing, mastering

== Charts ==
Chart (2002)	Peak position
German Albums (Offizielle Top 100)	100
