= Black Hand Inn =

Studio album by Running Wild
- Released: 24 March 1994
- Recorded: 1993–1994
- Studio: Horus-Sound-Studio, Hanover and Vox Klangstudio, Bendestorf
- Genre: Heavy metal, power metal
- Length: 65:46
- Label: Electrola
- Producer: Rolf Kasparek, Karl-Ulrich Walterbach

Running Wild chronology
Pile of Skulls (1992)	Black Hand Inn (1994)	Masquerade (1995)

Singles from Black Hand Inn
- 1. "The Privateer" Released: 10 March 1994

Professional ratings
Review scores
Source	Rating
AllMusic	1.5/5 stars
Rock Hard	9/10

Black Hand Inn is the eighth studio album by German heavy metal band Running Wild, released on 24 March 1994 through Noise Records. It is a loose concept album about a resurrected man, against a backdrop of piracy, foreseeing Armageddon.

== Content ==
The narrative begins with the first song "The Curse", in which a man named John Xenir (voiced by Rolf Kasparek) has been condemned to death for using forbidden powers and is burned at the stake to save his soul. After the fire burns out, all that is left is a blackened and charred hand. In the title track, John is alive and creates his own inn in a grove with the sign of a black hand on the front door. He shows to his patrons his powers by predicting their futures. A priest happens to see his powers and threatens him, calling him a devil. However, John is unfazed and tells the man that long ago he was burned away and that the priest is really the evil one.

The lyrics of the song "Genesis" are based on the book "The 12th Planet" by Zecharia Sitchin.

== Reception ==
In 2005, Black Hand Inn was ranked number 394 in Rock Hard magazine's book The 500 Greatest Rock & Metal Albums of All Time.

== Track listing ==
All songs written by Rolf Kasparek

Side A
No.	Title	Length
1.	"The Curse"	3:15
2.	"Black Hand Inn"	4:32
3.	"Mr. Deadhead"	4:02
4.	"Soulless"	4:57
5.	"The Privateer"	4:21
6.	"Fight the Fire of Hate"	6:38

Side B
No.	Title	Length
7.	"The Phantom of Black Hand Hill"	6:25
8.	"Freewind Rider"	5:15
9.	"Powder & Iron"	5:18
10.	"Dragonmen"	5:42
11.	"Genesis (The Making and the Fall of Man)"	15:18
Total length:		65:43

Japanese bonus tracks
No.	Title	Length
12.	"Poisoned Blood" (From The Privateer EP)	3:42
13.	"Dancing on a Minefield" (From The Privateer EP)	5:00
Total length:		74:25

== Personnel ==
- Rolf Kasparek – vocals, guitar
- Thilo Hermann – guitar
- Thomas Smuszynsky – bass guitar
- Jörg Michael – drums

Additional Musicians

- Ralf Nowy – flute on "Dragonmen"
- Thomas Rettke – backing vocals

Production

- Rock 'n' Rolf – producer
- Charlie Bauerfeind – engineering, mixing, mastering
- Sascha Paeth – engineering (additional), programming
- Marisa Jacobi – layout, typography
- Karl-Ulrich Walterbach – executive producer
- Andreas Marschall – cover art

== Charts ==
Chart (1994)	Peak position
German Albums (Offizielle Top 100)	54
Swiss Albums (Schweizer Hitparade)	50
