= Pirate metal =

Genre of heavy metal music

- Stylistic origins: Speed metal; power metal; folk metal; sea shanties
- Cultural origins: Late-1980s Germany, mid-2000s United Kingdom, United States
- Typical instruments: Electric guitar; bass guitar; drums; keyboards; folk instruments

Other topics
- Golden Age of Piracy; Viking metal

Pirate metal is a style of heavy metal music characterized by its incorporation of pirate mythology within the music and sometimes in stage performances. Lyrics often use piratical jargon and various musical genres, such as thrash metal, speed metal, and folk metal, may be combined with traditional-sounding songs like sea shanties. Folk instruments, such as the concertina, accordion, tin whistle, or steel drums, can be incorporated or emulated with synthesizers. Band members often dress up in period costume during performances, and concert attendees may do so as well. Pirate metal is sometimes referred to by the media as a music scene.

== History ==
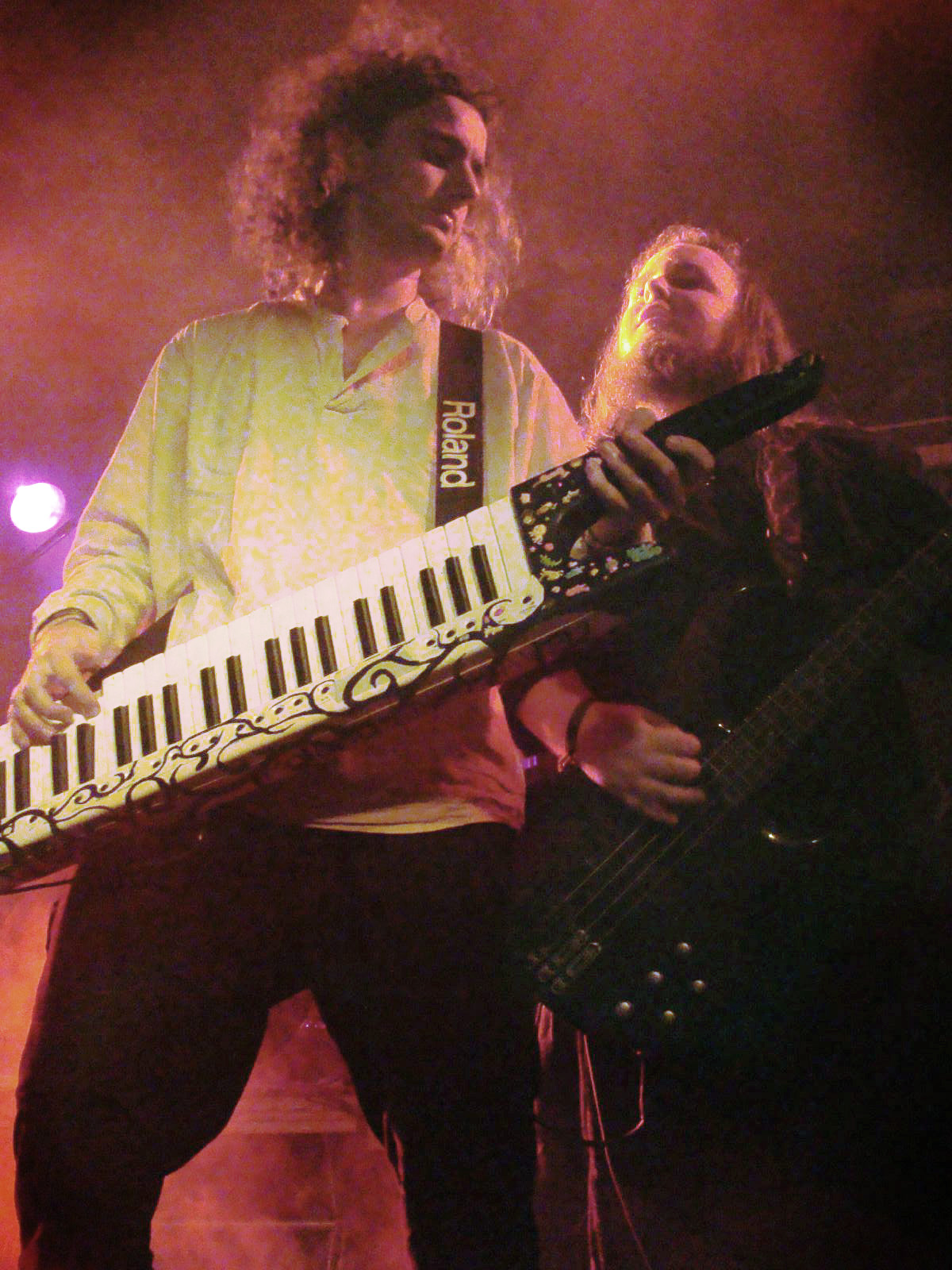
Christopher Bowes and Dani Evans of Alestorm

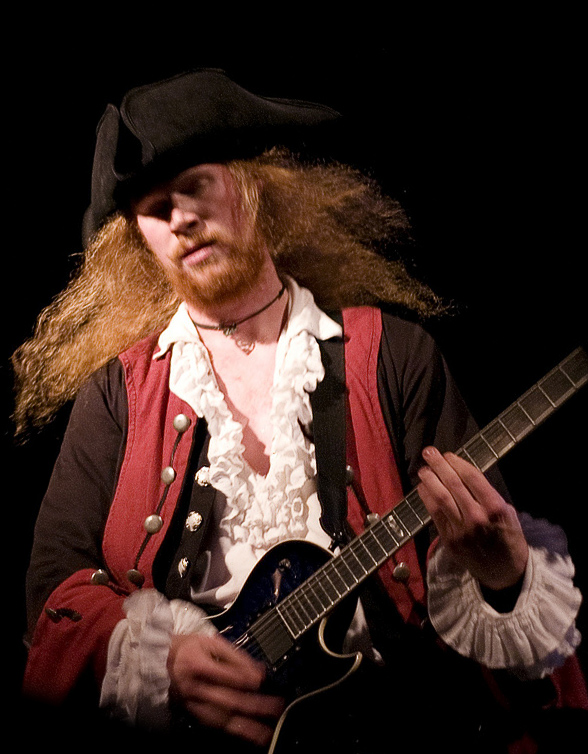
Commodore Redrum of Swashbuckle

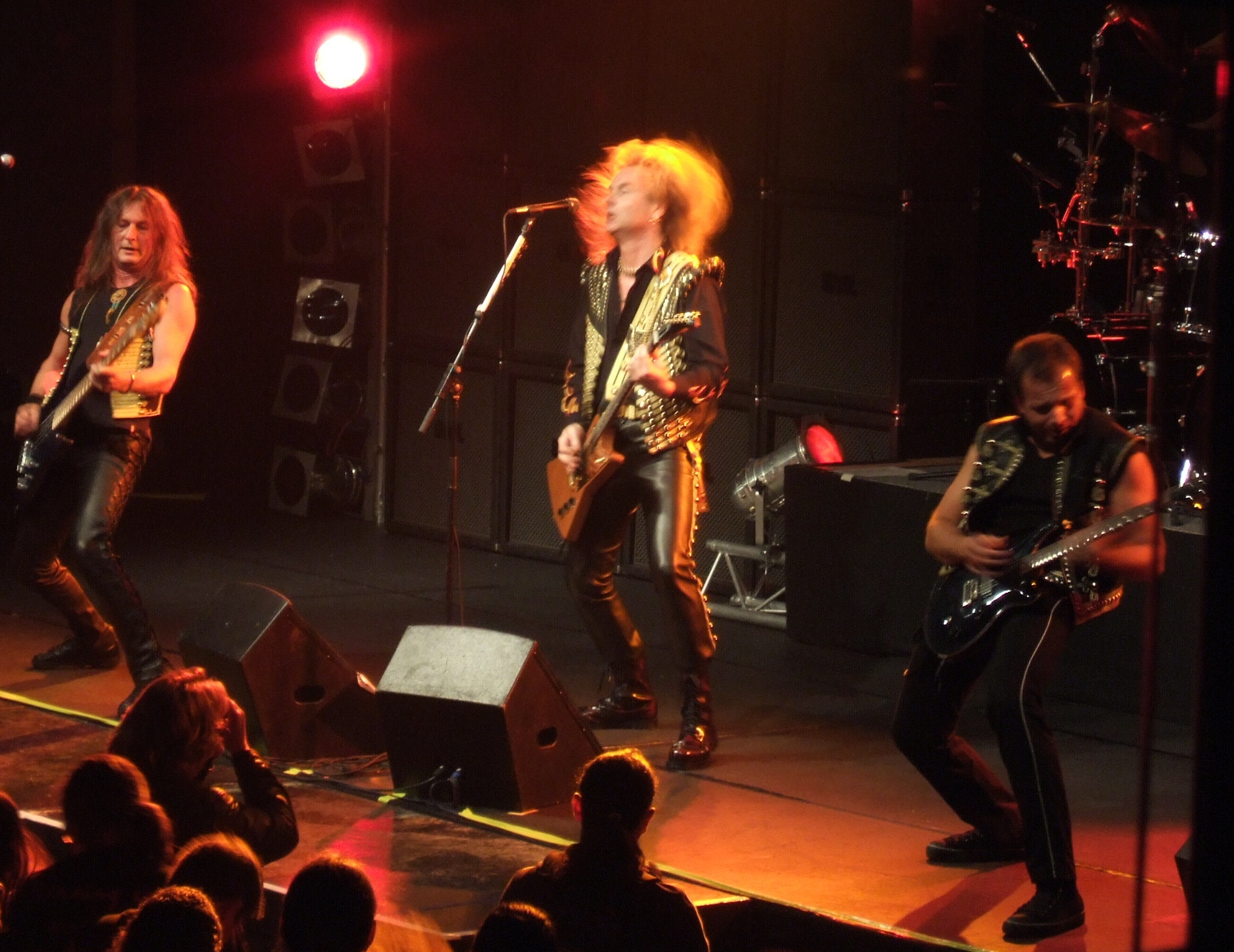
Running Wild

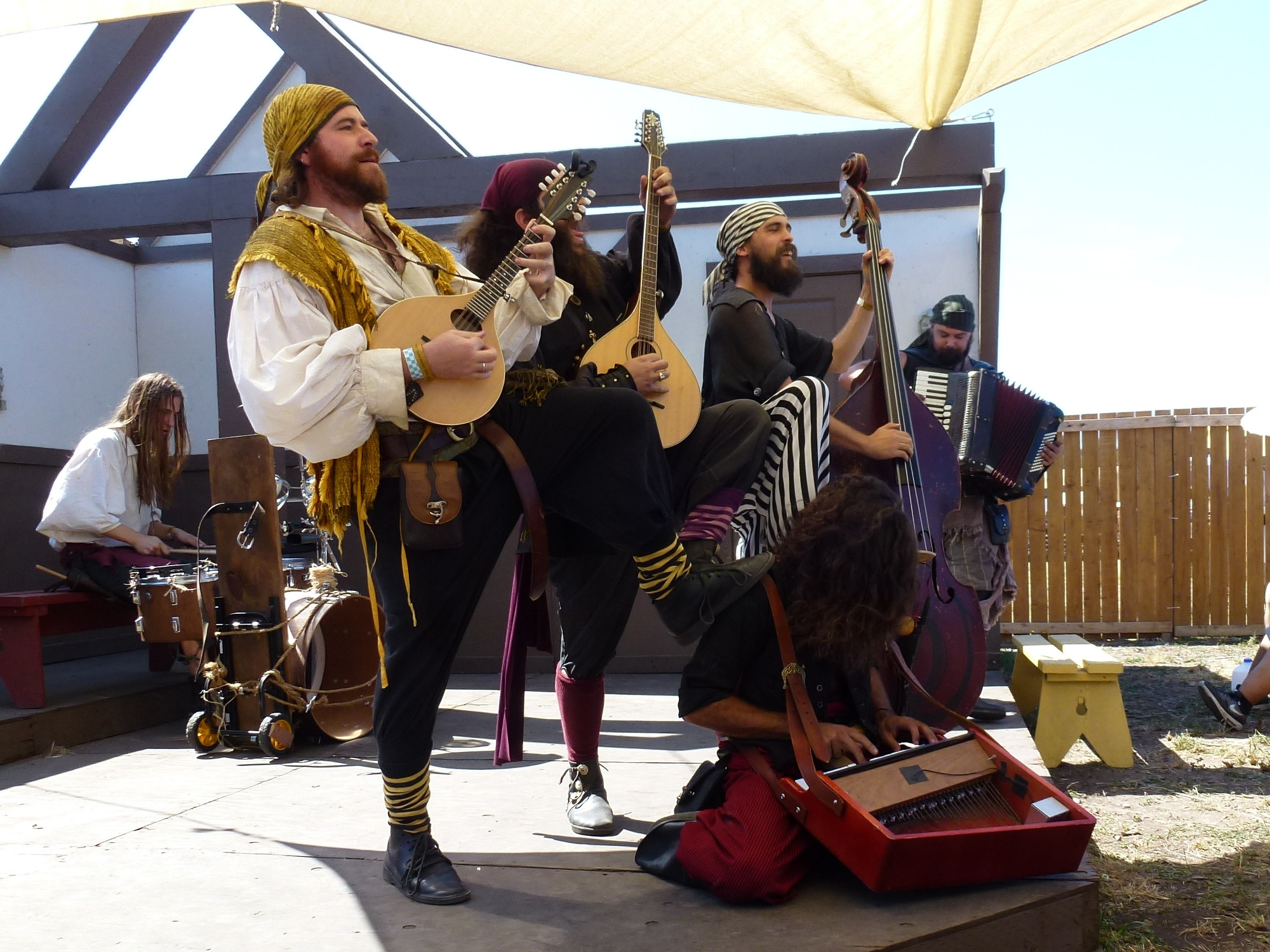
The Dread Crew of Oddwood

=== Origins and early history ===
The earliest example of pirate metal most likely appeared when Australian heavy metal band Black Jack released their 1979 and 1983 demos, and their later 1985 vinyl EP, Five Pieces O' Eight. Their pirate themes, lyrics, stage shows and imagery were a precursor to later, more mainstream pirate metal. Black Jack's stage show featured costumes, sets, props and mock hangings. Additionally, on their 1984 album, Walpurgis Night, German band Stormwitch included a song titled "Skull and Crossbones."

Pirate metal was more widely established and popularized by German heavy metal band Running Wild. They released their third album, Under Jolly Roger in 1987, and according to Rolf Kasparek, lead singer and guitarist for the band, the album's pirate theme was not planned. Instead, it grew from the album's title song. Eventually, the album's artwork was changed to match the title, and set decorations and costumes for future concerts were designed. The piratical lyrics also became a way to convey the band's political message, since their use of the devil as a symbolic figure was being misunderstood on their first album Gates to Purgatory. Kasparek began reading about pirates and, after finding "everything very interesting", he incorporated the motifs into their music. The subject matter was expanded during rehearsals for the fourth release, Port Royal, and their trademark style was solidified.

Although Kasparek was more interested in the true histories of the Golden Age of Piracy, pirate metal would eventually be inspired, to a greater extent, by the inaccuracies as invented or portrayed in novels and Hollywood films.

Another band that adopted a pirate motif before the official coining of “Pirate Metal” is Detritus from the UK. They were founded in 1989. Their music combines thrash metal, Christian metal and pirate motifs They continue to release music, with their most recent album coming out in 2020.

Visions of Atlantis, an Austrian symphonic metal band, was founded in 2000. Their original concept was focused around the mythical lost city of Atlantis and adventuring on the sea in general, but their more recent work is directly about pirates. In 2019 the symphonic power metal band Visions of Atlantis released the album Wanderers, which touched on some nautical and piratical themes. With the release of their next album, Pirates, in 2022 they had embraced the pirate theme changing into a mix of symphonic power metal to more power pirate metal. This trend would continue with their latest album, Pirates II – Armada, released on July 5, 2024.

=== Alestorm and the revival of pirate metal ===
After a two-year hiatus, Christopher Bowes and Gavin Harper reformed their band, Battleheart in 2006. Napalm Records signed them to the label, and they were told to change their name; Bowes and Harper easily agreed and settled on Alestorm. Since then, the band is responsible for reviving the popularity of pirate metal with their pirate image and humor in their albums and performances.

=== Post-Alestorm ===
Following the success of Alestorm, further bands have adopted the pirate metal style in their own ways. Not all of them are power metal like Alestorm, they range from Folk to death metal.

Swashbuckle is another band labelled pirate metal, known for its pirate image and humorous stage performances. They were founded in 2005, with their first album releasing a year later.

The Dread Crew of Oddwood is a San Diego–based band founded in 2008 that does acoustic folk metal with a pirate theme. They describe their style as “Heavy Mahogany”. They have released five albums so far, with the latest in 2024.

Alestorm's second studio album, Black Sails at Midnight, was released May 27, 2009.

The folk metal band Red Rum are from the East Midlands in the United Kingdom known for their cover of They're Taking the Hobbits to Isengard. They have toured with Skiltron, Lagerstein, and Iron Seawolf.

Rumahoy was also founded in 2011. Each of the members wears a ski mask while performing. Their lead singer, Captain Yarrface, has guest starred on several Alestorm albums and the two bands are frequent collaborators. They have released two full-length albums, The Triumph of Piracy and Time II: Party in 2018 and 2019, respectively in addition to several singles and a demo. It was later revealed that Rumahoy was founded by Christopher Bowes as a side project.

Alestorm's third studio album, Back Through Time, was released June 3, 2011.

Storm Seeker is a German pirate-folk-metal band from Düsseldorf and Neuss.

Skull and Bones is another pirate metal band from Argentina with their main theme centered around the golden age of piracy.

Alestorm's fourth studio album, Sunset on the Golden Age, was released on August 1, 2014. Alestorm released their fifth studio album, No Grave But The Sea, on May 26, 2017.

Alestorm released their sixth studio album, Curse of the Crystal Coconut, on May 29, 2020. Alestorm released their seventh studio album, Seventh Rum of a Seventh Rum, on June 24, 2022.

Pirate Queen was formed in 2023. The British/Spanish band is the first all-female pirate metal band.

== List of bands ==
Band name	Year founded	Country of origin	Genre	Band website
Alestorm	2006	Scotland	Power metal	
Anchorsmashed	2018	Scotland	Folk/pirate metal	
Running Wild	1979	Germany	Heavy metal	
Swashbuckle	2005	United States	Thrash metal	
The Dread Crew of Oddwood	2008	United States	Acoustic folk metal	
Red Rum	2011	England	Neoclassical pirate metal	
Ye Banished Privateers	2008	Sweden	Folk rock	
Calarook	2019	Switzerland	Folk/death metal	
Rumahoy	2011	United States	Power metal	
Visions of Atlantis	2000	Austria	Symphonic metal	
Iron Seawolf	2009	England	Folk metal	
Lagerstein	2010	Australia	Folk metal	
Stormfrun	2013	Sweden	Folk metal	
Storm Seeker (band)	2013	Germany	Folk metal	
Skull and Bones	2011	Argentina	Folk metal	
Detritus (band)	1989	England	Christian metal/thrash metal	
Pyrates!	2005	England	Folk Rock	
Shtack	2008	The Netherlands	Melodic death metal	
Entoria	2013	Germany	Melodic death metal	
