= Running Wild (band) =

German heavy metal band

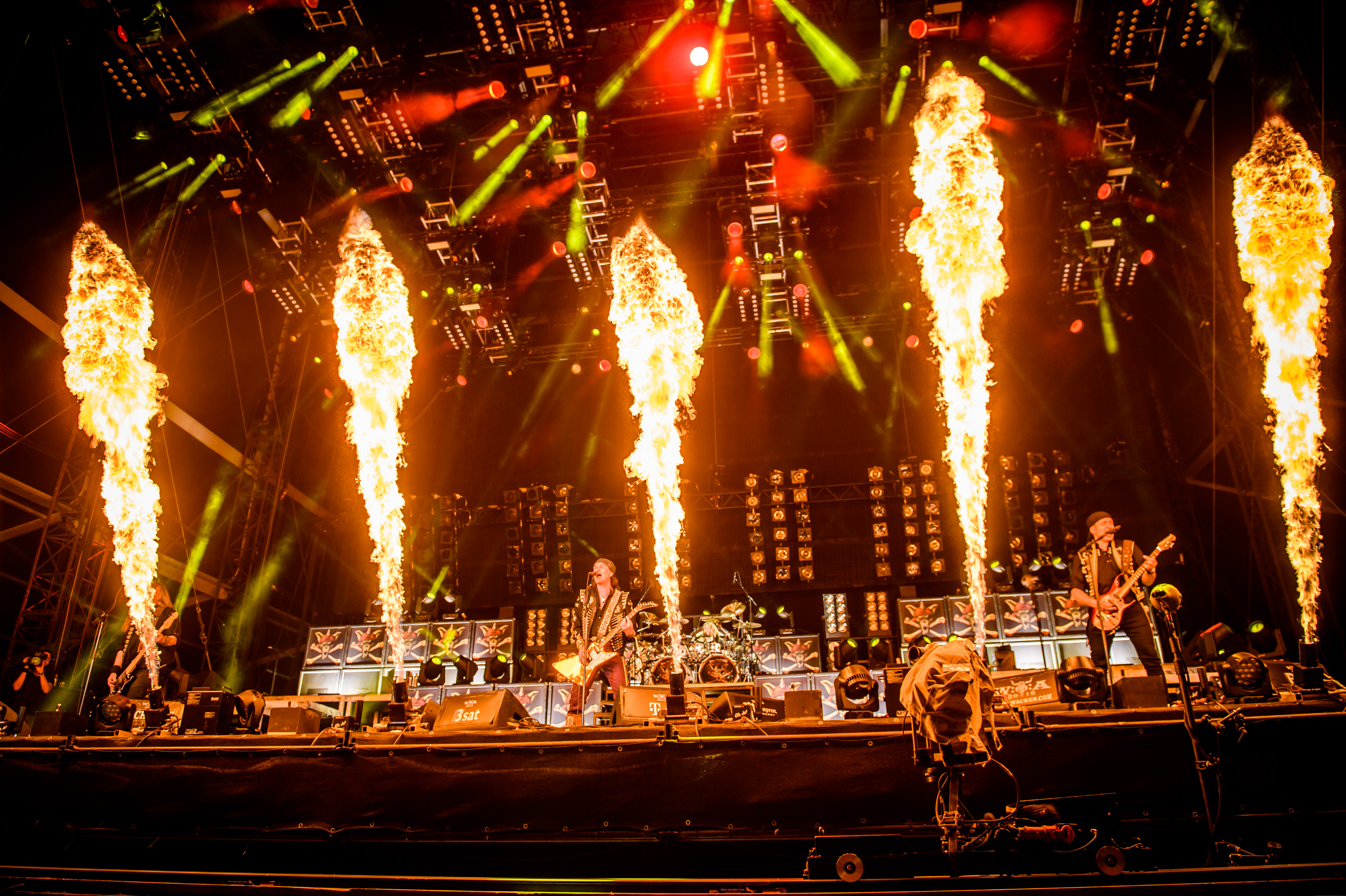
- Running Wild at Wacken Open Air 2018

Background information
- Also known as: Granite Heart (1976–1979)
- Origin: Hamburg, Germany
- Genres: Heavy metal; power metal; speed metal; pirate metal
- Years active: 1979–2009; 2011–present
- Labels: GUN; Noise; SPV/Steamhammer
- Members: Rolf Kasparek; Peter Jordan; Ole Hempelmann; Michael Wolpers
- Past members: See below
- Logo
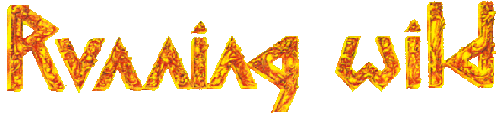

Running Wild is a German heavy metal band formed in Hamburg in 1976. They were part of the German heavy metal scene to emerge in the early to mid-1980s and are considered part of the scene's "big four" alongside Grave Digger, Helloween and Rage. Over the course of their career, they have released 17 studio albums, three live albums, five compilation albums, and six singles/EPs.

Although their earlier releases contained Satanic themes and imagery, from the third album on, the band's primary subject matter was pirates, sailing and other historical events. In 1987, the band released the album Under Jolly Roger, which was a switch to pirate-based and historical themes, creating and influencing the later named pirate metal subgenre of heavy metal in the 2000s in the process. While the historical lyrics were superficial at first, the lyrics for later albums were intensively researched, by frontman Rolf Kasparek in particular.

After Under Jolly Roger, from 1988 to 1992 (for the albums Port Royal, Death or Glory, Blazon Stone and Pile of Skulls), Running Wild mainly wrote historically based lyrics. In addition to lyrics about pirates, the band also addressed subjects like the Wars of the Roses, the Battle of Waterloo, or the colonization of the New World by the Conquistadors.

In April 2009, Kasparek announced that Running Wild had split up. Their intended last show was at Wacken Open Air in July that year. It was recorded for CD and DVD release and appeared as The Final Jolly Roger in 2011. The split proved temporary as they reunited in 2012. Running Wild played live for the Wacken Open Air festival in 2015. As of 2021, the band has released 17 studio albums, with their most recent being Blood on Blood.

== History ==
=== Early years and first albums ===
The band formed in 1976 under the name Granite Heart, but they changed their name in 1979 to Running Wild after the Judas Priest song of the same name. The band recorded their first demo in 1981 and featured the songs "Hallow the Hell", "War Child" and "King of the Midnight Fire". The first two of these tracks appeared on the compilation album "Debüt №1" on the Raubbau Label. In June 1984, the band started work on their debut album, Gates to Purgatory, which was released by Noise Records, featuring satanic lyrics. The album was a success, and the band quickly gained a cult following. Guitarist Gerald "Preacher" Warnecke left the band soon after the album's release. (Warnecke was studying theology at the time and is now a pastor in Cologne.) The band soon recruited Majk Moti to take his place, and soon recorded their follow-up Branded and Exiled in 1985. This album was the final release of the band with satanic imagery in their music.

=== Rise in popularity, success and later albums ===
For the following release, the band shifted their sound and image and adopted a pirate theme. The band released Under Jolly Roger in 1987. This would prove a significant change because the band would be more known as a "pirate metal" band, with lyrics dealing with pirates and historical events. With this album, the band found their identity, and the pirate theme would be prominent on their future releases. Their 1988 follow-up release Port Royal featured a more mature style of songwriting and expanded on the pirate theme explored on their previous album. The album featured one of the band's first epics, "Calico Jack". In 1989, the band's fifth studio recording, Death or Glory, was the band's most successful album to date. The tour was also a success and a concert during the tour was filmed and was released as Death or Glory Tour. This album and tour were the last to feature guitarist Majk Moti and drummer Ian Finlay.

Upon the departure of Moti and Finlay, Kasparek recruited guitarist Axel Morgan and drummer Rudiger Dreffein (better known as "AC") to record the band's first album in two years, Blazon Stone, released in 1991. The album continued the band's trend of writing about historical themes, and according to band leader Rolf Kasparek, it was the band's best-selling album of the 1990s. With this album, the band brought a more speed-metal approach to their songs, which would be prevalent throughout their releases during the decade. In 1992, the band began work on Pile of Skulls, which many regarded as one of the band's strongest efforts. Around this time, Kasparek started becoming more interested in conspiracy theories, becoming the basis of the next album, 1994's Black Hand Inn.

1995's Masquerade was the first in a trilogy of albums dealing with a specific theme. The album was one of Running Wild's worst-selling albums up to that point. The second installment was the 1998 album The Rivalry under their new label GUN Records, with the conclusion of the trilogy being 2000's Victory. It would be the final album featuring drummer Jörg Michael. With so many line-up changes, Running Wild was considered a solo project due to the fact that guitarist and main songwriter Rolf Kasparek remained the sole constant member of the band. The album The Brotherhood was released in 2002. It was another three years before Running Wild released another album, Rogues en Vogue in 2005. Two tribute albums, The Revivalry and Rough Diamonds, were also released in 2005. Rough Diamonds was a free download on the band's official website. A third tribute album, ReUnation, was released in 2009.

=== The Final Jolly Roger, hiatus and reunion ===
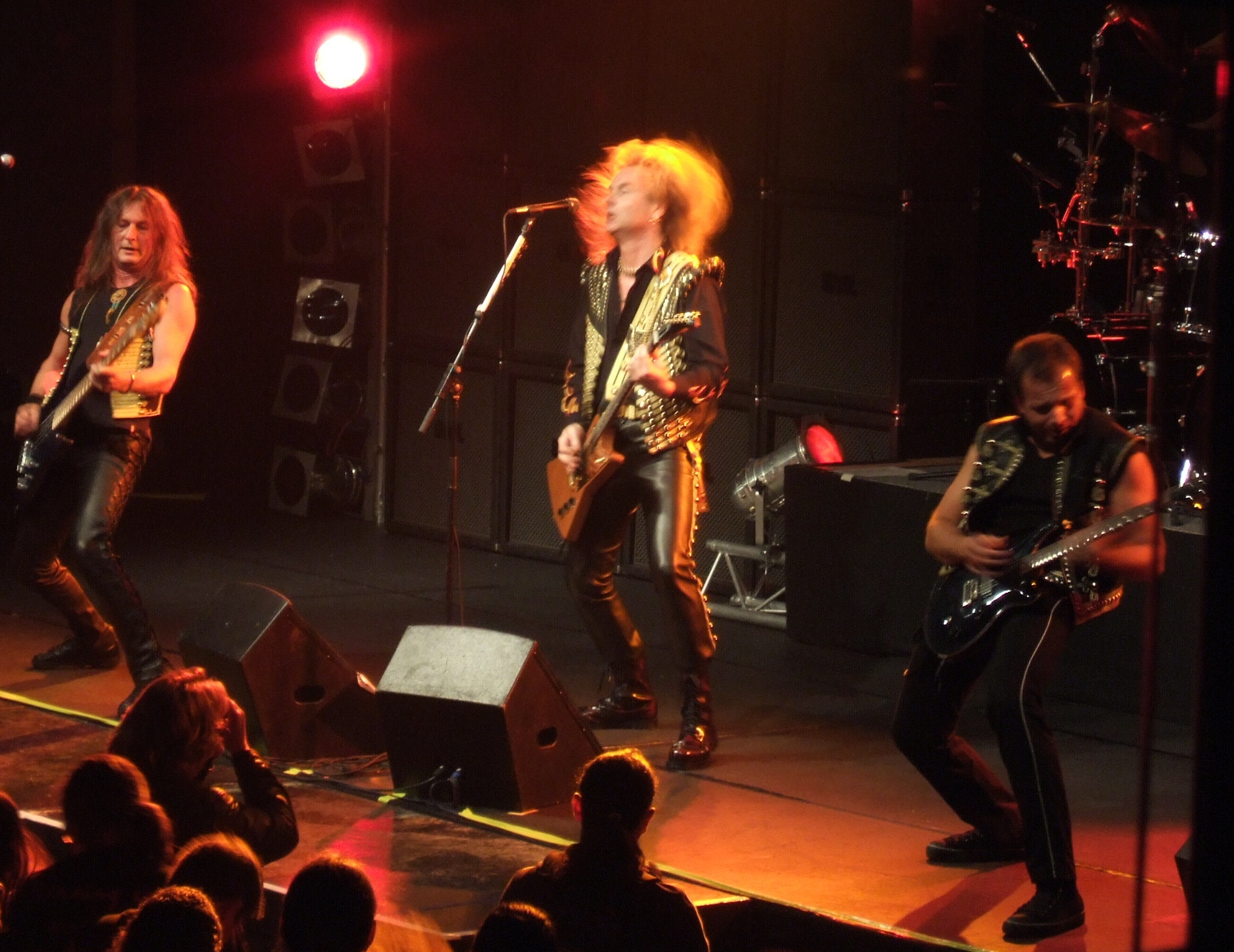
Running Wild in 2005

On 17 April 2009, Rolf Kasparek announced the disbandment of Running Wild. The band performed their final show at Wacken Open Air on 30 July 2009, which would be recorded for a future DVD release. The resulting effort, The Final Jolly Roger, was released on 24 June 2011 on CD and DVD format. In May 2011, Kasparek explained that he did not want the band to return due to other desires of his own. A biography, titled Death and Glory: The Story of a Heavy Metal Legend, was announced in June 2011 that was tentatively scheduled for release in 2013 or 2014, but no more information was given since then. In October 2011, Running Wild reformed and announced that they would record a new album, titled Shadowmaker, which was released on 20 April 2012 via SPV/Steamhammer. In November 2012, Kasparek and guitarist Peter Jordan formed a side project called Giant X, releasing an album titled I in January 2013.

The next album, Resilient, was released on 4 October 2013. The band made their return appearance at the 2015 edition of Wacken and included a new song from an upcoming album.

The sixteenth album, Rapid Foray, was released on 26 August 2016.

On 6 December 2019, an EP titled Crossing the Blades was released as an early hint for a new album.

Running Wild's seventeenth album, Blood on Blood, was released on 29 October 2021. Their song "Diamonds and Pearls" was elected by Loudwire as the 31st best metal song of 2021.

On 16 February 2023, former guitarist Michael "Majk Moti" Kupper died at the age of 65.

Running Wild is set to play their final show at Wacken Open Air in 2026 with a final album to be released prior.

== Band members ==
Current

- Rolf "Rock 'n' Rolf" Kasparek — lead vocals, guitar (1976–1982, 1982–2009, 2011–present)
- Peter J. Jordan — guitar, backing vocals (2005–2009, 2011–present)
- Ole Hempelmann — bass, backing vocals (2015–present)
- Michael Wolpers — drums (2015–present)

== Discography ==
Studio albums

- Gates to Purgatory (1984)
- Branded and Exiled (1985)
- Under Jolly Roger (1987)
- Port Royal (1988)
- Death or Glory (1989)
- Blazon Stone (1991)
- Pile of Skulls (1992)
- Black Hand Inn (1994)
- Masquerade (1995)
- The Rivalry (1998)
- Victory (2000)
- The Brotherhood (2002)
- Rogues en Vogue (2005)
- Shadowmaker (2012)
- Resilient (2013)
- Rapid Foray (2016)
- Blood on Blood (2021)

Live albums

- Ready for Boarding (1988)
- Live (2002)
- The Final Jolly Roger (2011)

Compilation albums

- The First Years of Piracy (1991)
- The Story of Jolly Roger (1998)
- The Legendary Tales (2002)
- 20 Years in History (2003)
- Best of Adrian (2006)
- Black Demons on Stage (2010)
- Greatest Hits (2011)
- Riding the Storm: Very Best of the Noise Years 1983–1995 (2016)
- Pieces of Eight: The Singles, Live and Rare 1984–1994 (2018)

Singles and EPs

- "Victim of States Power" (1984)
- "Bad to the Bone" (1989)
- "Wild Animal" (1990)
- "Little Big Horn" (1991)
- "Lead or Gold" (1992)
- "The Privateer" (1994)
- "The Rivalry" (1998)
- "Revolution" (2000)
- "Crossing the Blades" (2019)

Video albums

- Death or Glory Tour – Live (1989, VHS)
- Live (2002, DVD)
- The Final Jolly Roger (2011, DVD)

Split releases

- Rock From Hell: German Metal Attack (1983)
- Death Metal (1984)
- Metal Attack Vol. 1 (1985)

Tribute albums

- The Revivalry – A Tribute to Running Wild (2005)
- Rough Diamonds – A Tribute to Running Wild (2005)
- ReUnation – A Tribute to Running Wild (2009)
