= 70000 Tons of Metal =

Annual heavy metal music festival at sea

70000TONS OF METAL
- Genre: Heavy metal
- Dates: Yearly in January or February
- Locations: Ft. Lauderdale / Miami, Florida
- Years active: 2011–present
- Founders: Andy Piller
- Attendance: 3,000
- Organiser: UMCruises
- Website: 70000tons.com

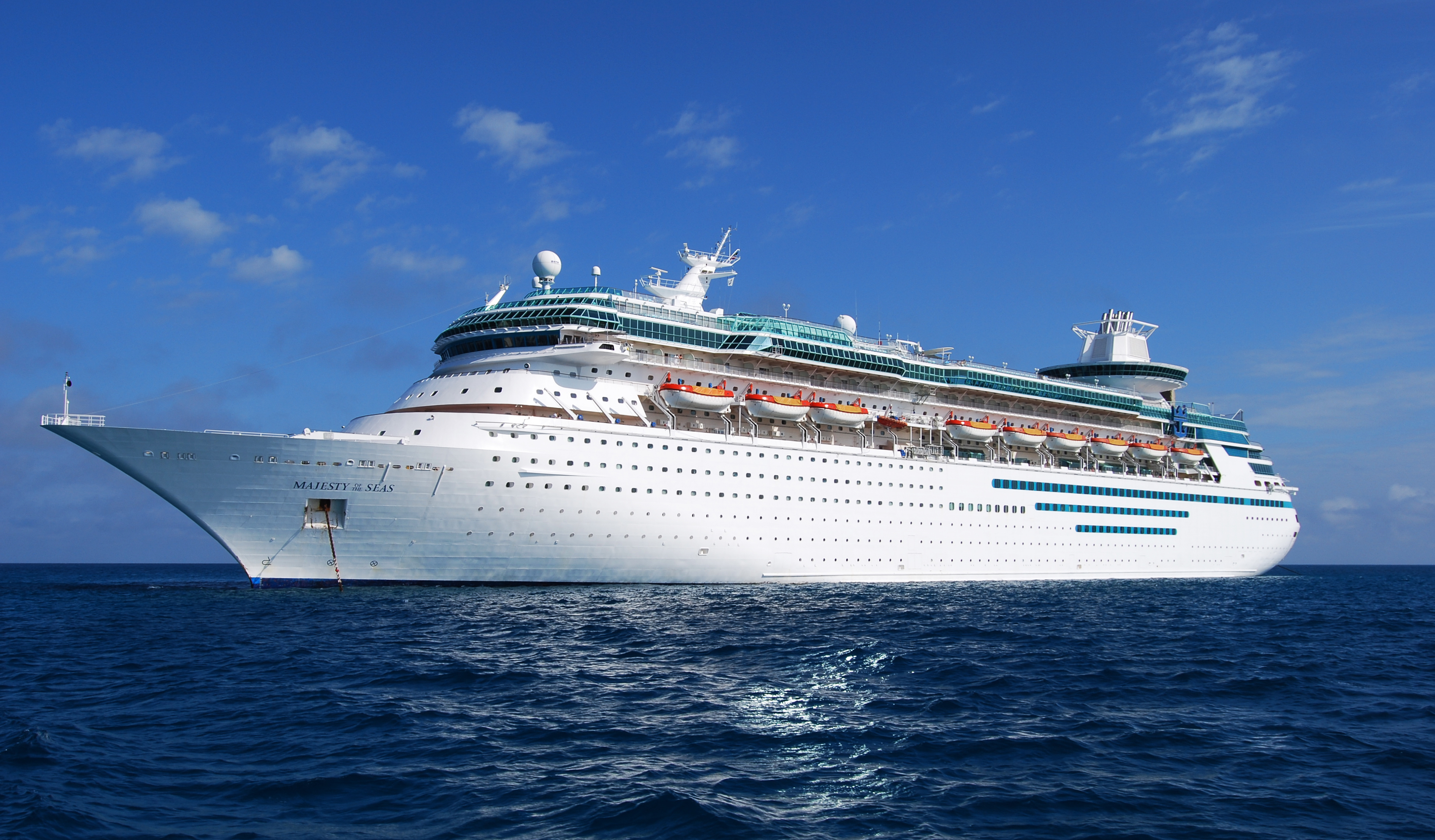
Majesty of the Seas (2011–2014)

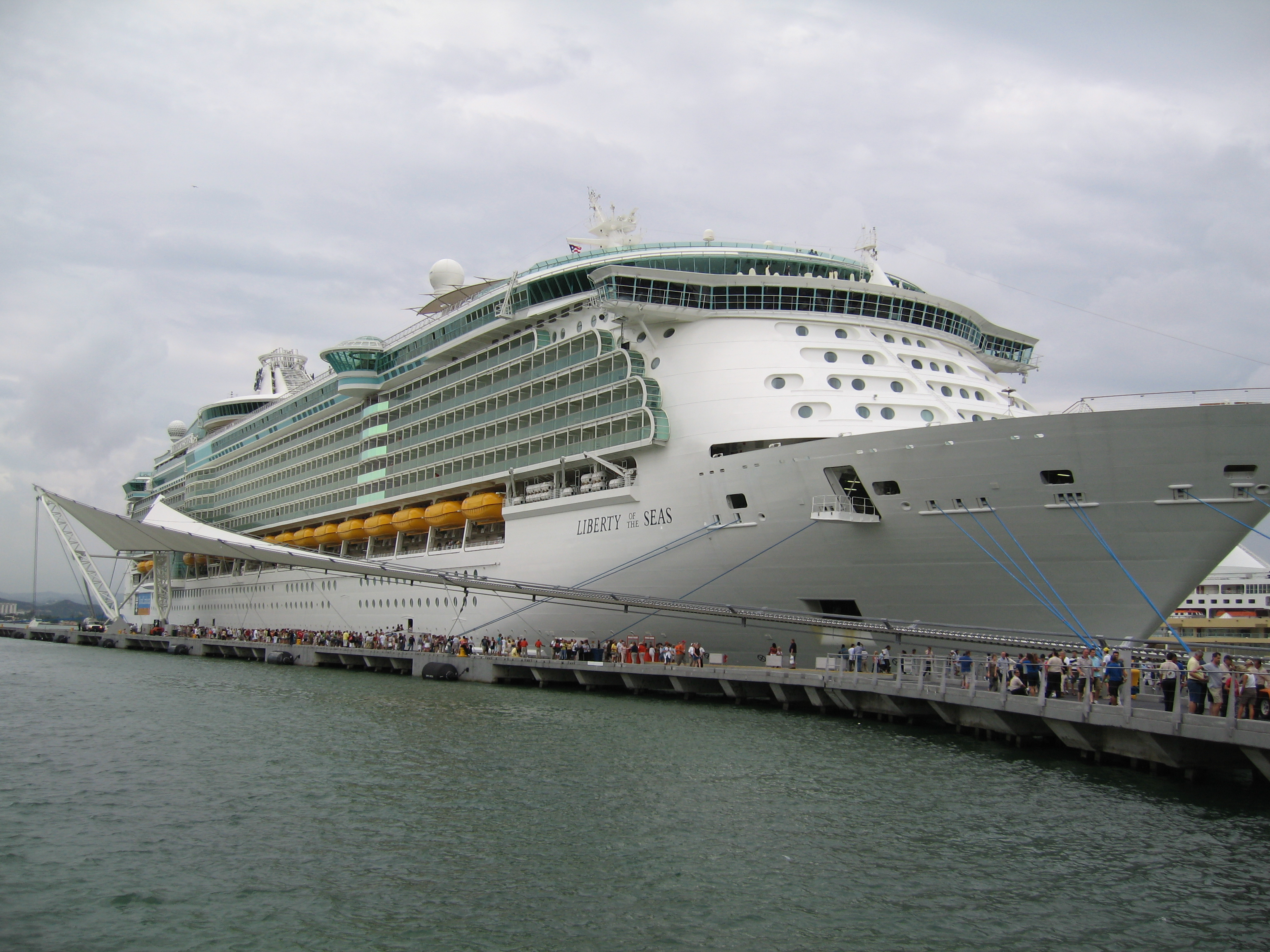
Liberty of the Seas (2015)

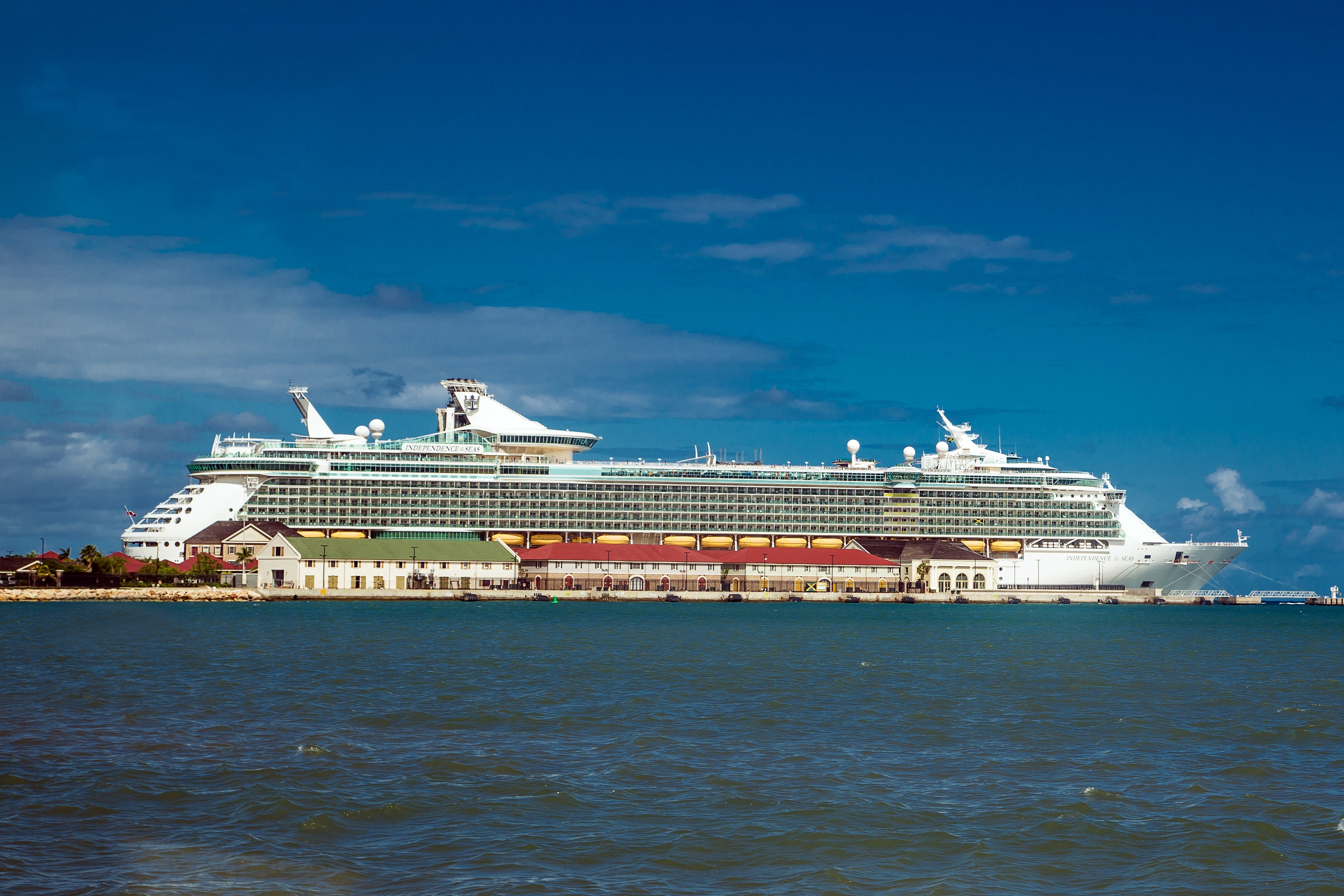
Independence of the Seas (2016–2020)

70000 Tons of Metal (officially stylized as 70000TONS OF METAL) is an annual heavy metal music festival that takes place on board a cruise ship. The event is a five-day festival, including one shore day at a select Caribbean destination.

== History ==
The first 70000 Tons of Metal was held in 2011, and until 2014, 70000 Tons of Metal took place on board the cruise liner Majesty of the Seas. In 2015, the festival moved to the cruise liner Liberty of the Seas and then to Independence of the Seas in 2016. From 2011 to 2014 and again in 2023 and 2024 the festival took place between Monday and Friday, from Thursday to Monday in 2015 to 2019, and Tuesday to Saturday in 2020. From 2011 to 2014, the cruise departed from PortMiami in Miami, Florida. For the years 2015 to 2020 it departed from Port Everglades in Fort Lauderdale, Florida, returning to Miami in 2023 after a hiatus due to the COVID-19 pandemic. The cruise sails to varying Caribbean tourist destinations and back. On each voyage, from 2011 to 2014 there were 40+ metal bands on board, each performing twice. From 2015 onward, there have been 60+ bands from different metal genres performing on board, also each performing twice. (With the exception of Swallow the Sun performing three shows on board in 2018.) Since 2011, there have been between 3500 and 5500 people on board each year, including the ship's crew.

In August 2011, the organizers of 70000 Tons of Metal announced an additional festival on a cruise ship, named "Barge to Hell", scheduled for December 3 to 7, 2012. Unlike the 70000 Tons of Metal cruises, Barge to Hell was only booked to approximately 60% capacity. The route went from Miami to Nassau in the Bahamas. The musical focus was on extreme metal genres like thrash, death and black metal.

== Background ==
Swiss concert promoter Andy Piller is the initiator and organizer of 70000 Tons of Metal. As a young adult, he began to organize concerts in his hometown of Flums, Switzerland, which later became his profession. Piller had the idea to hold a metal festival on a ship in 2006, when he observed passing cruise ships from his balcony. In the approximately four-year preparatory phase Piller went on several regular cruises, found investors who supported the project with grants in the millions and founded the company Ultimate Music Cruises, of which he is managing director (CEO).

There was a rumor in 2010 that 70000 Tons of Metal was planned to take place only once. Piller responded that "[he had] not invested four years to make this a one-time-thing" and that "there will be a next edition and almost certainly many more afterwards."

== Line-up and stage situation ==
Up to 60 bands from all genres of heavy metal perform at each edition of the festival. The main stage on the Majesty of the Seas was situated in the ship's theater "A Chorus Line" on Decks 5–7. On Deck 8 there was a smaller stage in the "Spectrum" lounge and on Deck 12 there was the open air "Pool Deck stage". For the Pool Deck stage, a separate pool was drained and covered to make room for the audience. Since 2012, the Pool Deck stage has become much larger and more professional. Since 2015, the festival has had four stages: the pool deck stage, a stage in the ship's main theater, the Ice Rink "Studio B" stage, and the smallest location, the ship's show-lounge.

== Accommodation and pricing ==
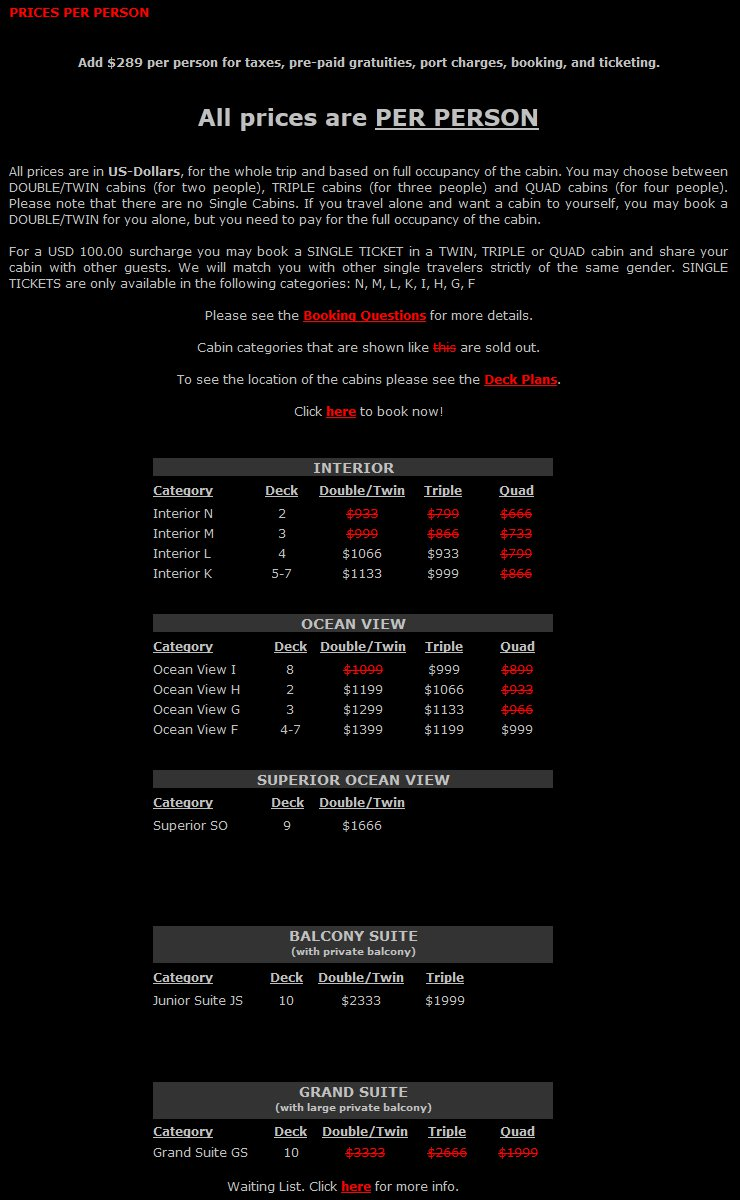
Pricing, 70000 Tons, 2012

To visit the festival, it is only necessary to book a cabin, this includes meals, non-alcoholic and non-carbonated drinks, and entry to all performances. The cheapest tickets (4-passenger cabin, deck 2) are always available for US$766 per person, the most expensive (2-passenger Grand Suite with large balcony, deck 10) are $2999 (2017), $3333 (2012 and 2013), also per person. Additional costs per passenger vary each year; these are for taxes, port fees, "booking fees," nonrefundable onboard gratuities, and other administrative costs. In addition to the concerts, there are the usual amenities on board a cruise ship: a gym, a spa, a casino, several fee-included restaurants, pools, hot-tubs (some very close to the pool-deck stage), plus a basketball court, body-slides and a climbing wall for recreation.

== Reception ==
At first the cruise company and the ship's crew were skeptical about their unusual traveling party; however, due to the unexpectedly friendly and well-behaved guests and the economic success of the entire festival, their opinion changed fundamentally. In 2011, 70000 Tons of Metal received national and international press coverage. Metal Hammer magazine, Stern magazine and German TV stations RTL, NDR and ZDF featured the event. In 2012, documentaries about the festival were produced by CNN, Sat.1 and WDR. The most prestigious media to report on the cruise in 2013 were Aardschok, Blick.ch, CNN, Lingener Tagespost, Metal Hammer, Rock Hard, Spiegel Online and Süddeutsche Zeitung. Since 2013, Full Metal Cruise takes place in the Baltic Sea following a similar concept. To what extent the organizers were inspired by 70000 Tons of Metal is unclear.

== 2011 ==
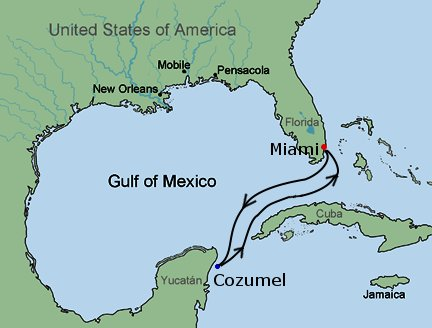
Route of 70000 Tons of Metal 2011

In 2011, the inaugural voyage of 70000 Tons of Metal set sail on January 24 from PortMiami, Miami, Florida toward Cozumel, Mexico and returned on January 28. The festival took place on board the Royal Caribbean Majesty of the Seas. The line-up included 42 international heavy metal bands, each band performed twice during the 5-day cruise.

=== Line-up ===
Artists: Agent Steel, Amon Amarth, Arsis, Blackguard, Blind Guardian, Circle II Circle, Cripper, Dark Tranquility, Death Angel, Destruction, Dusk Machine, Ensiferum, Epica, Exodus, Fear Factory, Finntroll, Forbidden, Gamma Ray, Iced Earth, Korpiklaani, Malevolent Creation, Marduk, Moonspell, Nevermore, Obituary, Rage, Raven, Sabaton, Sanctuary, Saxon, Sodom, Sonata Arctica, Swashbuckle, Testament, Trouble, Twilight of the Gods (Performing Bathory Masterpieces), Týr, Uli Jon Roth, Unleashed, Voivod, Witchburner.

=== Visitors and statistics ===
The festival was attended by 2,038 visitors from 49 countries. The largest group of visitors, at roughly 30% were from the United States. The second largest group of visitors came from Germany with a share of approximately 17%. Visitors from Canada (12%) and Australia (7%) were also strongly represented. In addition, around 100 journalists, the technical crews of the bands, and over 900 members of the ship's crew were on board, so that the total number of people on the ship amounted to 3571.

- Ship: Majesty of the Seas
- Sailing dates: January 24–28, 2011
- Route: PortMiami, Miami, Florida — Cozumel, Mexico — Miami, Florida
- Number of guests on board: 2038 (48 countries represented)
- Musicians and crew: 422
- Ship crew members: 900
- Total number of persons on board: 3360

Countries represented: Argentina, Australia, Austria, Belgium, Bolivia, Bosnia, Brazil and Herzegovina, Canada, Chile, China, Colombia, Costa Rica, Czech Republic, Denmark, Dominican Republic, Estonia, Faroe Islands, Finland, France, Germany, Greece, Hong Kong, Hungary, Ireland, Israel, Italy, Japan, Luxembourg, Mexico, Netherlands, New Zealand, Norway, Peru, Philippines, Poland, Portugal, Romania, Russia, Saudi Arabia, Slovakia, Slovenia, South Africa, Spain, Sweden, Switzerland, Turkey, United Kingdom, United States

=== Reception ===
The 70,000 Tons of Metal received a great deal of national and international press coverage. In total, around 100 journalists from all over the world were on board. In addition to scene-related print and online media, also the general press reported, many from German-speaking-countries, for example Stern magazine and TV broadcasters RTL, NDR and ZDF.

=== Documentaries ===
- "Heavy Metal auf dem Traumschiff", Peter Theisen, Harald Hamm, ZDF 2011, 29:52 minutes (German)
- "Das Alptraumschiff" (radio report), NDR 2011, 7:30 minutes (German)

== 2012 ==
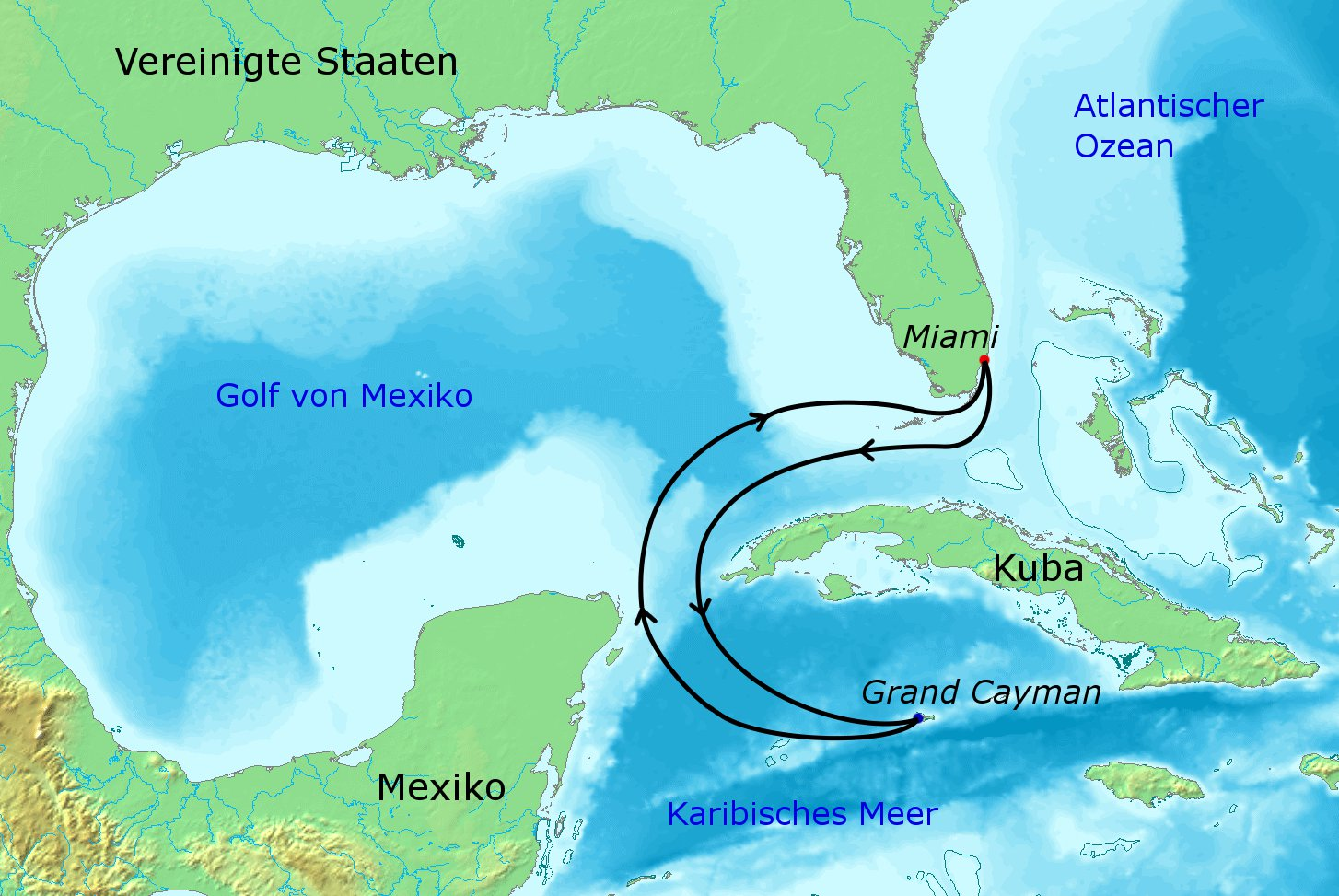
Route of 70000 Tons of Metal 2012

The second voyage of 70000 Tons of Metal departed from Miami, Florida on January 23, sailing toward George Town on Grand Cayman island of the Cayman Islands, and returning to Miami on January 27. The festival took place on board the Royal Caribbean Majesty of the Seas. 42 heavy metal acts performed on board in 2012. 2051 guests attended 70000 Tons of Metal in 2012, 51% of which had attended the festival the previous year. Of the 2051 guests, 55 nationalities were represented, surpassing the previous year.

=== Line-up ===
Artists: Alestorm, Amorphis, Annihilator, Atheist, Candlemass, Cannibal Corpse, Channel Zero, Children of Bodom, Coroner, Crowbar, Dark Funeral, Diamond Plate, Edguy, Eluveitie, Exciter, God Dethroned, Grave Digger, HammerFall, In Extremo, Kamelot, Kataklysm, Massacre, Megora, Moonsorrow, My Dying Bride, Nightwish, Orphaned Land, Overkill, Pestilence, Pretty Maids, Riot, Samael, Sapiency, Stratovarius, Suffocation, Tankard, Therion, Tristania, Venom, Vicious Rumors, Virgin Steele, Whiplash.

=== Visitors and statistics ===
The number of German citizens increased from 17% to 25%; the Americans fell from 30% to 25%, United States and German citizens made up for 50% of the guests, alone. The third-biggest number of visitors behind Germany and the United States came from Canada. In fourth place, measured by the absolute number of visitors, was Switzerland; followed by the Netherlands, Finland, Australia, Sweden, Mexico and in tenth place Belgium. The age range of the guests was 13 to 63 years (not taking into consideration Anette Olzon's one-year-old child).

Furthermore, about 100 journalists, 452 people from the bands' entourages, and 879 members of the ship's crew were on board, making the total number of persons on board approximately 3500.

- Ship: Majesty of the Seas
- Dates: January 23–27, 2012
- Route: PortMiami, Miami, Florida — George Town, Cayman Islands — Miami, FL
- Number of guests: 2051 (55 countries represented)
- Musicians and crew: 452
- Ship crew members: 879
- Total number of persons on board: 3352

Countries represented: Andorra, Argentina, Australia, Austria, Belgium, Bolivia, Bosnia and Herzegovina, Brazil, Bulgaria, Canada, Chile, Colombia, Costa Rica, Cuba, Czech Republic, Denmark, Ecuador, Egypt, Finland, France, Germany, Greece, Hungary, Iceland, Ireland, Israel, Italy, Japan, Kyrgyzstan, Lebanon, Luxembourg, Mexico, Netherlands, New Zealand, Norway, Panama, Peru, Poland, Portugal, Romania, Russia, Saudi Arabia, Sierra Leone, Slovakia, Slovenia, South Africa, South Korea, Spain, Sweden, Switzerland, Trinidad and Tobago, Turkey, Ukraine, United Kingdom, United States, Venezuela

=== Reception ===
As in 2011, numerous journalists, both from scene magazines and general press, attended 70000 Tons of Metal in 2012 to cover the event. The most prestigious media in 2012 were Aardschok, CNN, WDR 1LIVE, Het Laatste Nieuws, IMusic1, Kieler Nachrichten, Metal Hammer, Rock Hard and Sat.1. Some of these reports were print or video reports.

=== Documentaries ===
- "70,000 Tons of Heavy Metal", Percy von Lipinski, CNN 2012, 4:32 minutes (English)
- "70.000 Tons of Metal: Ein Boot, 40 Bands, 2000 Fans", Janine Horsch, Till Haase, Marion Quandt, WDR 1LIVE 2012, 38:02 minutes (German)
- "Metal-Kreuzfahrt", Sat.1, 2012, 5:29 minuten (German)

== 2013 ==
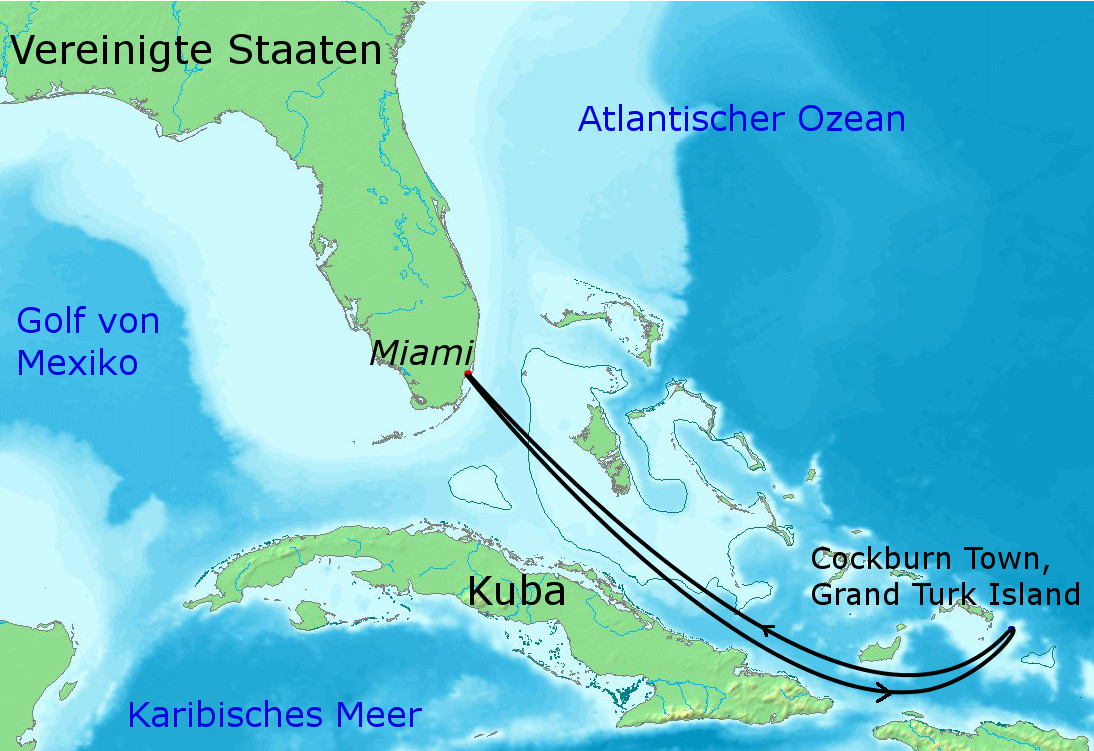
Route of 70000 Tons of Metal 2013

The third voyage of 70000 Tons of Metal embarked from Miami, Florida on January 28, sailing toward Cockburn Town, Turks and Caicos Islands, to return on February 1. The festival took place on board the Royal Caribbean Majesty of the Seas. 42 international heavy metal acts performed on board in 2013.

=== Line-up ===
Artists: 3 Inches of Blood, Anaal Nathrakh, Anacrusis, Angra, Arkona, Cryptopsy, Delain, Die Apokalyptischen Reiter, Doro, DragonForce, Ektomorf, Ensiferum, ETECC, Evergrey, Fatal Smile, Flotsam and Jetsam, Gotthard, Heidevolk, Helloween, Helstar, Holy Grail, Immolation, In Flames, Inquisition, Kreator, Lacuna Coil, Lizzy Borden, Metal Church, Nightmare, Nile, Onslaught, Rage and Lingua Mortis Orchestra, Sabaton, Sinister, Steel Engraved, Subway to Sally, Threat Signal, Tiamat, Turisas, Týr, Unexpect.

=== Visitors and statistics ===
2037 visitors from 55 countries or autonomous regions took part in the festival. Of these, 36% were female and 64% were male with an age range from 1 to 71 years.

Additionally, there were 466 people who belonged to the bands' entourages, as well as the 892 belonging to the ship's crew, so that the total number of people on board amounted to 3395.

In addition to the 42 heavy metal acts that performed in 2013, the guitarist and founder of heavy metal band Annihilator, Jeff Waters, organized an "All-Star Jam". The All-Star Jam included artists such as Petri Lindroos (Ensiferum), Cristina Scabbia (Lacuna Coil), Doro Pesch (Warlock, Doro), and Mille Petrozza (Kreator). The classical Ukrainian pianist, Vika Yermolyeva (aka "vkgoeswild"), was also featured in 2013, performing popular heavy metal piano covers such as "Raining Blood" by Slayer and "Nothing Else Matters" by Metallica. Also initiated in 2013 was the 70000 Tons of Metal Pool Girls, a team of brand ambassadors.

- Ship: Majesty of the Seas
- Dates: January 28 – February 1, 2013
- Route: PortMiami, Miami, Florida — Cockburn Town, Turks and Caicos Islands — Miami, Florida
- Number of Guests: 2037 (55 countries represented)
- Musicians and crew: 466
- Ship crew members: 892
- Total number of persons on board: 3395

Countries represented: Andorra, Argentina, Aruba, Australia, Austria, Belgium, Bolivia, Bosnia and Herzegovina, Brazil, Bulgaria, Canada, Chile, China, Colombia, Costa Rica, Czech Republic, Denmark, Finland, France, Germany, Greece, Honduras, Hungary, India, Ireland, Italy, Japan, South Korea, Liechtenstein, Luxembourg, Mexico, Netherlands, Norway, Panama, Peru, Poland, Portugal, Romania, Russia, Saudi Arabia, Slovakia, Slovenia, South Africa, Spain, Suriname, Sweden, Switzerland, Trinidad and Tobago, Ukraine, United Arab Emirates, United Kingdom, United States

=== Reception ===
As in previous years, numerous journalists from scene magazines and regular press attended 70000 Tons of Metal. The most prestigious press coverage this year came from Aardschok, Blick.ch, CNN, Lingener Tagespost, Metal Hammer, Rock Hard, Spiegel Online and Süddeutsche Zeitung. Other than the contribution of CNN, which is a short video documentary, the majority of press coverages was made in the form of written reports and photo galleries for print magazines or webzines.

=== Documentaries ===
- "70,000 Tons of Heavy Metal", Percy von Lipinski, CNN (2013), 4:33 minutes (English)
- "Heavy Metal 2013", Word Press Media, February 2, 2013 (English)
- "70000 Tons of Metal 2013", Sweden Rock, 2013 (Swedish)
- "Sonnenbrand im Kettenhemd", Metal Hammer Germany, April 2013 (German)

== 2014 ==
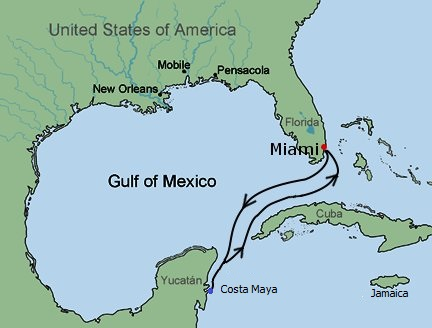
Route of 70000 Tons of Metal 2014

The fourth voyage of 70000 Tons of Metal departed from Miami, Florida on January 27 toward Costa Maya, Mexico, and returned on January 31. The destination for 2014 was selected through a voting process open to fully ticketed passengers on the official 70000 Tons of Metal website. The vote consisted of 5 potential Caribbean destinations: Cozumel, Mexico; Freeport, Bahamas; Cockburn Town, Turks and Caicos Islands; Nassau, Bahamas; and Costa Maya, Mexico. Costa Maya was announced as the destination winner with 40% of the votes, followed by Cockburn Town with 38%. The festival took place on board the Royal Caribbean Majesty of the Seas. 41 international heavy metal acts performed on board the event in 2014.

=== Line-up ===
Artists: Atrocity, Bonfire, Carcass, Cripper, Cynic, Dark Tranquility, Death Angel, Death, D.R.I., Fear Factory, Finntroll, Freedom Call, Gloryhammer, Haggard, Hatesphere, Izegrim, Keep of Kalessin, Leaves' Eyes, Massacre, Nekrogoblikon, Novembers Doom, Obituary, Orphaned Land, Overkill, Poltergeist, Raven, Rising Storm, Satyricon, Septicflesh, Soilwork, Swallow the Sun, Swashbuckle, Symphony X, Terrorizer, Pungent Stench, The Haunted, Twilight of the Gods, Unearth, Vicious Rumors, Victory, Xandria.

=== Visitors and statistics ===
- Ship: Majesty of the Seas
- Dates: January 27–31, 2014
- Route: PortMiami, Miami, Florida — Costa Maya, Mexico — Miami, Florida
- Number of guests: 2051 (61 countries represented)
- Musicians and crew: 458
- Ship crew members: 869
- Total number of persons on board: 3378

Countries represented: Andorra, Argentina, Australia, Austria, Belarus, Belgium, Bolivia, Bosnia and Herzegovina, Brazil, Bulgaria, Canada, Chile, Colombia, Costa Rica, Czech Republic, Denmark, Ecuador, Egypt, Estonia Finland, France, Germany, Greece, Honduras, Hong Kong, Hungary, India, Ireland, Israel, Italy, Japan, Kuwait, Kyrgyzstan, Luxembourg, Macedonia, Mexico, Netherlands, New Zealand, Norway, Panama, Peru, Poland, Portugal, Romania, Russia, Saudi Arabia, Sierra Leone, Slovakia, Slovenia, South Africa, South Korea, Spain, Sweden, Switzerland, Trinidad and Tobago, Turkey, Ukraine, United Kingdom, United States, Venezuela

=== Reception ===
Numerous journalists from all around the world reported on the cruise, for example: Aardschok (Netherlands), Abort (Canada), Bild (Germany), Bravewords (Canada), La Presse (Canada), Metallian (France), Metal Hammer (Spain, Germany, United Kingdom), MetalSucks (United States), Rock Hard (Germany), Terrorizer (United Kingdom).

=== Documentaries ===
- "70000 Tons of Metal", Terrorizer #246, 2014 (English)
- "Populaires, les Croisières Heavy Metal!", La Presse, February 10, 2014 (French)
- "The MetalSucks Podcast #37: 70,000 Tons of Metal Special Edition", MetalSucks, February 10, 2014 (English)
- "70000 Tons of Metal – Miami to Mexico and Back", Joe Daly, Metal Hammer UK, 2014 (English)
- "70000 Tons of Metal 2014", Arto Lehtinen, Metal Rules March 10, 2014 (English)
- "Die irre Reise auf dem Metal-Kutter", Enrico Ahlig, Bild, February 8, 2014 (German)

== 2015 ==
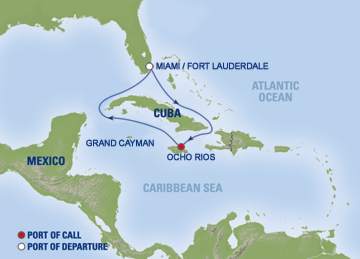
Route of 70000 Tons of Metal 2015

The fifth edition of 70000 Tons of Metal took place on January 22–26, 2015, sailing from Port Everglades, Fort Lauderdale, Florida to Ocho Rios, Jamaica on board the Royal Caribbean Liberty of the Seas. 3000 tickets were available to the public and 60 artists performed on board, each band playing two sets. Four stages were constructed for the event to accommodate the additional 20 artists, which included stages in the Platinum Theatre, the Sphinx Lounge, Studio B, and the Pool Deck which hosts the "Biggest Open Air Stage to Sail the Seas". Over 70 countries were represented by the fans on board in 2015, making 70000 Tons of Metal, according to the "Skipper", Andy Piller, the "United Nations of Metal at Sea".

=== Line-up ===
70000 Tons of Metal hosted an array of special on board events 2015. The fifth edition of 70000 Tons of Metal saw the return of the Jamming in International Waters with Jeff Waters All-Star Jam. The All-Star Jam included a hard-hitting lineup with featured on board artists including members of 1349, Annihilator, Behemoth, Blind Guardian, D-A-D, Destruction, Ensiferum, Grave Digger, Heathen, In Extremo, Michael Schenker, Napalm Death, Primal Fear, Soulfly, Therion, Threshold, and Venom.

70000 Tons of Metal 2015 also hosted Exclusive World Album Premieres for Apocalyptica's Shadowmaker; Blind Guardian's, Beyond the Red Mirror; Korpiklaani's Noita; and Venom's From the Very Depths.

An array of clinics were hosted by on board artists which included guitar, bass, drums & blast beats, tambourine and a folk and Pagan seminar.

Artists: 1349, Alestorm, Amorphis, Annihilator, Anvil, Apocalyptica, Arch Enemy, Artillery, Behemoth, Blind Guardian, Cannibal Corpse, Chimaira, Crucified Barbara, D-A-D, Dark Sermon, Divided Multitude Einherjer, Ensiferum, Equilibrium, Gama Bomb, God Dethroned, Grave Digger, Heathen, In Extremo, Jungle Rot, Kataklysm, Korpiklaani, Lake of Tears, Michael Schenker's Temple of Rock, Monstrosity, Municipal Waste, Napalm Death, Origin, Pretty Maids, Primal Fear, Refuge, Riot V, Soulfly, Tank, Therion, Threshold, Triosphere, Trollfest, Trouble, Venom, Whiplash, Wintersun

=== Visitors and statistics ===
- Ship: Liberty of the Seas
- Dates: January 22–26, 2015
- Route: Port Everglades, Fort Lauderdale, Florida — Ocho Rios, Jamaica — Fort Lauderdale, Florida
- Number of guests: 3014 (70 countries represented)
- Musicians and crew: 944
- Ship crew members: 1312
- Total number of persons on board: 5270

Countries represented: Andorra, Argentina, Australia, Austria, Belgium, Bolivia, Brazil, Bulgaria, Canada, Chile, Colombia, Costa Rica, Croatia, Czech Republic, Denmark, Ecuador, Egypt, El Salvador, Estonia, Finland, France, Germany, Greece, Guatemala, Hong Kong, Hungary, India, Ireland, Israel, Italy, Japan, Kuwait, Kyrgyzstan, Liechtenstein, Lithuania, Luxembourg, Macedonia, Mexico, Moldova, Netherlands, New Zealand, Nicaragua, Norway, Panama, Peru, Philippines, Poland, Portugal, Romania, Russia, Saudi Arabia, Singapore, Serbia, Slovakia, Slovenia, South Africa, Spain, Sri Lanka, Sweden, Switzerland, Thailand, Trinidad and Tobago, Turkey, Ukraine, United Kingdom, United Arab Emirates, United States, Uzbekistan, Venezuela

=== Reception ===
Again, a huge number of journalists from all around the world were on board, for example Age of Metal (US), Aardschok (Netherlands), Abort (Canada), Bravewords (Canada), Metallian (France), Metal Hammer (Spain, Germany, UK), MetalSucks (US), Rock Hard (Germany, Italy), Terrorizer (UK).

=== Documentaries ===
- "70000 Tons of Metal Recap", Cat Hedlund, Age of Metal, March 2015 (English)
- "70000 Tons of Metal", Aardschok, March 2015 (Dutch)
- "Heavy Metal Wedding on the High Seas for Saint John Couple", Megan MacAlpine, CBC News Canada, 2015 (English)
- "Krach der Karibik", Dorian Gorr, Manuel Liebler, Metal Hammer Deutschland (German)
- "Casi el Doble – 70000 Tons of Metal", Darkana Kat, Metal Hammer Espagna (Spanish)
- "70,000 Tons of Podcast, Featuring Corrosion of Conformity + Max and Gloria Cavalera", MetalSucks (English)
- "70000 Tons of Metal – Mit 70 Nationen durch die Karibik", Conny Schiffbauer, Rock Hard, March 2015 (German)
- "70,000 Tons of Metal", Terrorizer #257, 2015 (English)

== 2016 ==
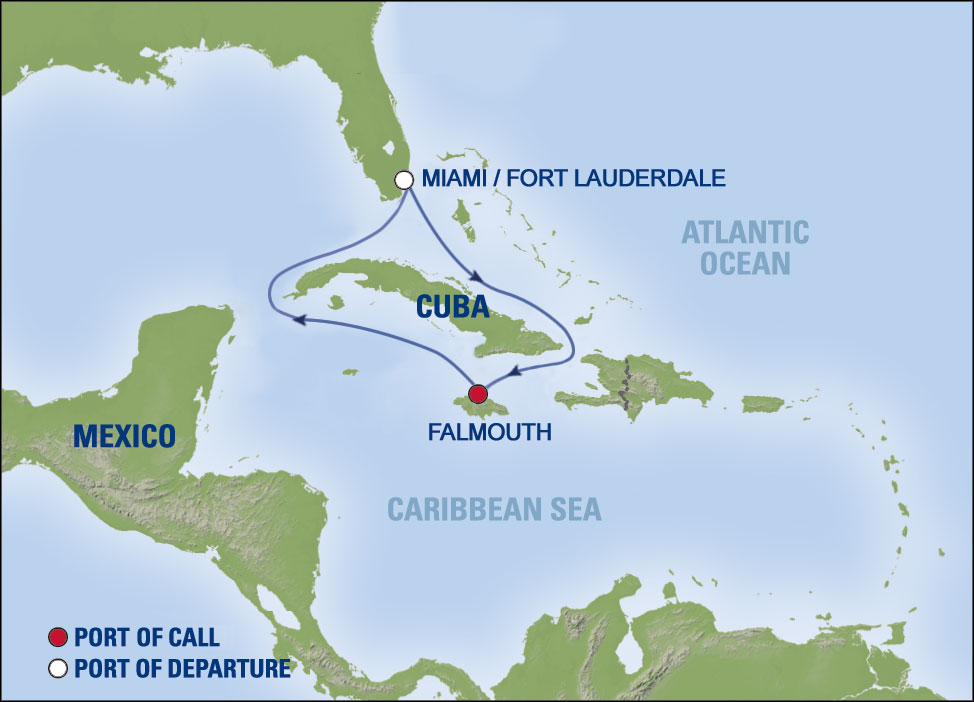
Route for 70000 Tons of Metal 2016

The sixth edition of 70000 Tons of Metal took place on February 4–8, 2016, sailing from Fort Lauderdale, Florida to Falmouth, Jamaica on board the Royal Caribbean Independence of the Seas. The event hosted 60 international artists each of whom played two concerts across four stages. 70000 Tons of Metal sold out for its sixth consecutive year with 3000 tickets available to the public. According to Piller in a press release, among these 3000 guests, 72 nationalities worldwide were represented on board.

=== Line-up ===
In addition to the 120 concerts performed by the onboard artists, 70000 Tons of Metal 2016 also saw the return of the Jamming with Waters in International Waters All-Star Jam hosted by Jeff Waters of Annihilator. The All-Star Jam featured performances from artists in bands such as Delain, Gamma Ray, Lacuna Coil, Firewind, Moonspell, HammerFall, Iced Earth, and more. Other special events included an acoustic pub jam by Swiss folk metal band Eluveitie, an exclusive listening party for Delain's then unreleased album Lunar Prelude, the annual Belly Flop contest, a live screening of the Super Bowl, and clinics hosted by select artists.

Artists: Abinchova, Ancient Rites, Arkona, At the Gates, Aura Noir, Belphegor, Bloodbath, Carach Angren, Children of Bodom, Cradle of Filth, Dead Cross, Delain, Dia de los Muertes, Diamond Head, Distillator, DragonForce, Eluveitie, Epica, Fallujah, Firewind, Fleshgod Apocalypse, Gamma Ray, Ghoul, HammerFall, Holy Moses, Iced Earth, Incantation, Insomnium, Jag Panzer, Katatonia, Koyi K Utho, Krisiun, Lacuna Coil, Manilla Road, Moonspell, My Dying Bride, Nervosa, No Raza, Novembers Doom, Painful, Paradise Lost, Raven, Rhapsody of Fire, Rotting Christ, Samael, Skálmöld, Sodom, Squealer, Starkill, Stratovarius, Subway to Sally, Susperia, Thyrfing, Tsjuder, Turisas, Twilight Force, Týr, Vader, Vallenfyre, Visions of Atlantis.

=== Visitors and statistics ===
- Ship: Independence of the Seas
- Dates: February 4–8, 2016
- Route: Port Everglades, Fort Lauderdale, Florida — Falmouth, Jamaica — Fort Lauderdale, Florida
- Number of guests: 3007 (72 countries represented)
- Musicians and crew: 938
- Ship crew members: 1316
- Total number of persons on board: 5261

Countries represented: Andorra, Argentina, Australia, Austria, Bahamas, Belarus, Belgium, Bolivia, Brazil, Bulgaria, Canada, Chile, Colombia, Costa Rica, Croatia, Cuba, Czech Republic, Denmark, Ecuador, Egypt, El Salvador, Estonia, Finland, France, Germany, Greece, Guatemala, Hong Kong, Hungary, Iceland, India, Iran, Ireland, Israel, Italy, Japan, Jordan, Kyrgyzstan, Luxembourg, Malta, Mexico, Moldova, Netherlands, New Zealand, Nicaragua, Norway, Palestine, Panama, Peru, Poland, Portugal, Qatar, Romania, Russia, Serbia, Slovakia, Slovenia, South Africa, Spain, Sri Lanka, Sweden, Switzerland, Trinidad and Tobago, Turkey, Ukraine, United Arab Emirates, United Kingdom, United States, Venezuela

=== Reception ===
As in previous years, numerous journalists from scene magazines and regular press attended 70000 Tons of Metal. The most prestigious press coverage this year came from Huffington Post, Aardschok, Blabbermouth, Metal Hammer, Rock Hard, and Kerrang!. ARTE filmed a documentary series on board in 2016.

=== Documentaries ===
- "The Vessel of Hell", Arte, 2016 (English)
- "El Barco del Infierno", Arte, 2016 (Spanish)
- "Le Bateau de l'Enfer", Arte, 2016 (French)
- "Kreuzfahrt 666", Arte, 2016 (German)

== 2017 ==
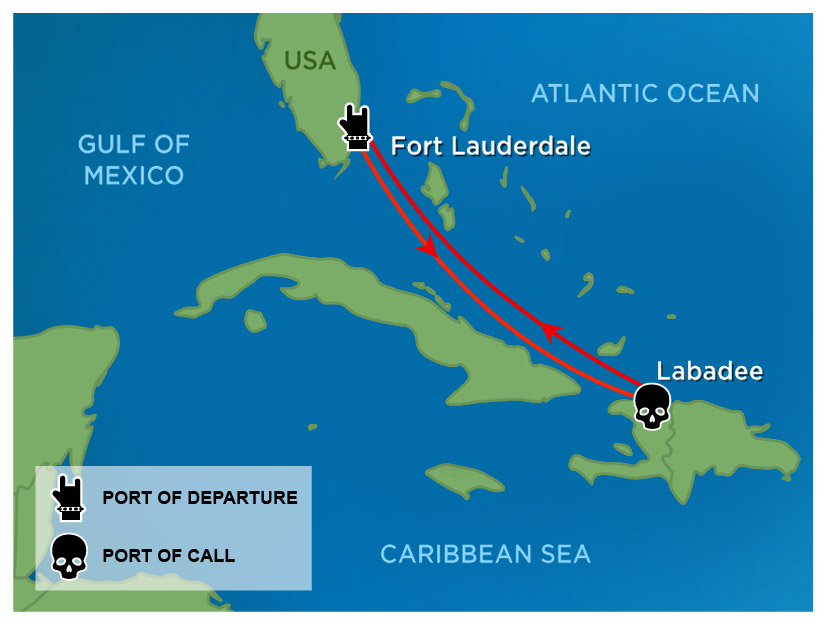
Route of 70000 Tons of Metal 2017

The seventh edition of 70000 Tons of Metal set sail on February 2–6, 2017 from Fort Lauderdale, Florida to Labadee, Haiti and back. The event took place on the Royal Caribbean Independence of the Seas.

Special on board events included "Jamming with Waters in International Waters", artist clinics, exclusive listening parties, the annual 70000 Tons of Metal belly flop contest, karaoke in the solarium, and a live screening of Super Bowl Sunday. The Jamming with Waters in International Waters All-Star Jam featured artists from Amaranthe, Amorphis, Annihilator, Anthrax, Carcass, Death Angel, Draconian, Dying Fetus, Ghost Ship Octavius, Grave Digger, Overkill, Scar Symmetry, Serenity, Stuck Mojo, Testament, Therion, Touch the Sun, and Xandria.

70000 Tons of Metal 2017 featured 61 artists, performing 123 live concerts on board. The event sold out for its seventh consecutive year. Of the 3000 fans in attendance, 74 nationalities were represented.

=== Line-up ===
Artists: Allegaeon, Amaranthe, Amorphis, Angra, Annihilator, Anthrax, Arch Enemy, Avatarium, Axxis, Cattle Decapitation, Cruachan, Cryptex, Cryptopsy, Dalriada, Death Angel, Demolition Hammer, DevilDriver, Draconian, Dying Fetus, Edenbridge, Equilibrium, Ghost Ship Octavius, Grave, Grave Digger, Haggard, Kalmah, Kamelot, Månegarm, Marduk, Misery Loves Co., Moonsorrow, Mors Principium Est, Nightmare, Omnium Gatherum, Orden Ogan, Orphaned Land, Overkill, Pain, Powerglove, Psycroptic, Revocation, Saltatio Mortis, Scar Symmetry, Serenity, Stam1na, Striker, Stuck Mojo, Suffocation, Testament, Therion, Total Death, Trauma, Trollfest, Touch the Sun, Uli Jon Roth, Unleashed, Vreid, Witchtrap, Xandria

=== Visitors and statistics ===
- Ship: Independence of the Seas
- Dates: February 2–6, 2017
- Route: Port Everglades, Fort Lauderdale, Florida — Labadee, Haiti — Fort Lauderdale, Florida
- Number of guests: 3022 (74 countries represented)
- Musicians and crew: 981
- Ship crew members: 1445
- Total number of persons on board: 5448

Countries represented: Andorra, Argentina, Australia, Austria, Belarus, Belgium, Bolivia, Brazil, Bulgaria, Canada, Chile, China, Colombia, Costa Rica, Croatia, Cuba, Czech Republic, Denmark, Ecuador, Egypt, El Salvador, Estonia, Finland, France, Germany, Greece, Guatemala, Honduras, Hong Kong, Hungary, India, Iran, Ireland, Israel, Italy, Japan, Lebanon, Lithuania, Luxembourg, Malta, Mexico, Moldova, Netherlands, New Caledonia, New Zealand, Nicaragua, Norway, Panama, Peru, Philippines, Poland, Portugal, Qatar, Romania, Russia, Saudi Arabia, Singapore, Slovakia, Slovenia, South Africa, Spain, Sri Lanka, Sweden, Switzerland, Trinidad and Tobago, Tunisia, Turkey, Ukraine, United Arab Emirates, United Kingdom, United States, Venezuela

=== Reception ===
As in previous years, journalists and photographers from a huge number of countries around the world attended 70000 Tons of Metal.

=== Documentaries ===
- "70000 Tons of Metal: One Man's Journey", Angry Metal Guy, 2017 (English)
- "70000 Tons of Metal All-Star Jam Provides Dream Team of Collaborations", ASX.com, 2017 (English)
- "The United Nations of Metal", LA Canvas, 2017 (English)
- "Metal Sets Sail", Metal Hammer UK, 2017, (English)
- "Four Reasons 70,000 Tons of Metal Remains the Best Metal Cruise", Frank Godla, Metal Injection, 2017 (English)
- "70,000 Tons of Metal – Exclusif! L'aventure Vécue par Matt Asselberghs – Guitariste de Nightmare", Metallian, March 2017 (French)
- "70,000 Tons of Metal, Day 1 Recap — The World's Biggest Heavy Metal Cruise", My Global Mind, February 26, 2017 (English)

== 2018 ==
The eighth edition of 70000 Tons of Metal set sail on February 1–5, 2018 from Fort Lauderdale, Florida to Cockburn Town, Turks and Caicos Islands and back on board the Royal Caribbean Independence of the Seas.

70000 Tons of Metal 2018 featured 61 artists, performing 123 live concerts on board. The event sold out for its eighth consecutive year. Of the 3000 fans in attendance, 75 nationalities were represented.

=== Line-up ===
Artists: Aborted, Aeternam, Alestorm, Amberian Dawn, Battle Beast, Belphegor, Benediction, Benighted, Beyond Creation, Cannibal Corpse, Dark Tranquillity, Destruction, Diablo Blvd, Die Apokalyptischen Reiter, Enslaved, Evergrey, Evertale, Exciter, Exhumed, Exodus, Freedom Call, Goatwhore, Gyze, In Extremo, In Mourning, Insomnium, Internal Bleeding (band), Kataklysm, Korpiklaani, Kreator, Leaves' Eyes, Majestic Downfall, Masterplan, Meshuggah, Metal Church, Metsatöll, Naglfar, Necrophobic, Obscura, October Tide, Primal Fear, Psychostick, Rhapsody, Sabaton, Samael, Septicflesh, Sepultura, Seven Kingdoms, Seven Spires, Sinister, Sirenia, Sonata Arctica, Swallow the Sun, Threshold, Triosphere, Voivod, Witchery, Witherfall, Wolfchant, Wolfheart

=== Visitors and statistics ===
- Ship: Independence of the Seas
- Dates: February 1–5, 2018
- Route: Port Everglades, Fort Lauderdale, Florida — Cockburn Town, Grand Turk, Turks and Caicos Islands — Fort Lauderdale, Florida
- Number of guests: 3087 (75 countries represented)
- Musicians and crew: 1032
- Ship crew members: 1448
- Total number of persons on board: 5567

Countries represented: Andorra, Argentina, Australia, Austria, Belarus, Belgium, Bolivia, Brazil, Bulgaria, Canada, Chile, China, Colombia, Costa Rica, Croatia, Cuba, Czech Republic, Denmark, Dominican Republic, Ecuador, Egypt, El Salvador, Estonia, Finland, France, Germany, Greece, Guatemala, Honduras, Hong Kong, Hungary, India, Iran, Ireland, Israel, Italy, Japan, Lebanon, Lithuania, Luxembourg, Malta, Mexico, Netherlands, New Caledonia, New Zealand, Nicaragua, Norway, Pakistan, Palau, Panama, Peru, Poland, Portugal, Romania, Russia, Saudi Arabia, Singapore, Slovakia, Slovenia, South Africa, Spain, Sri Lanka, Sweden, Switzerland, Syria, Trinidad and Tobago, Tunisia, Turkey, Ukraine, United Arab Emirates, United Kingdom, Uruguay, United States, Venezuela, Vietnam

== 2019 ==
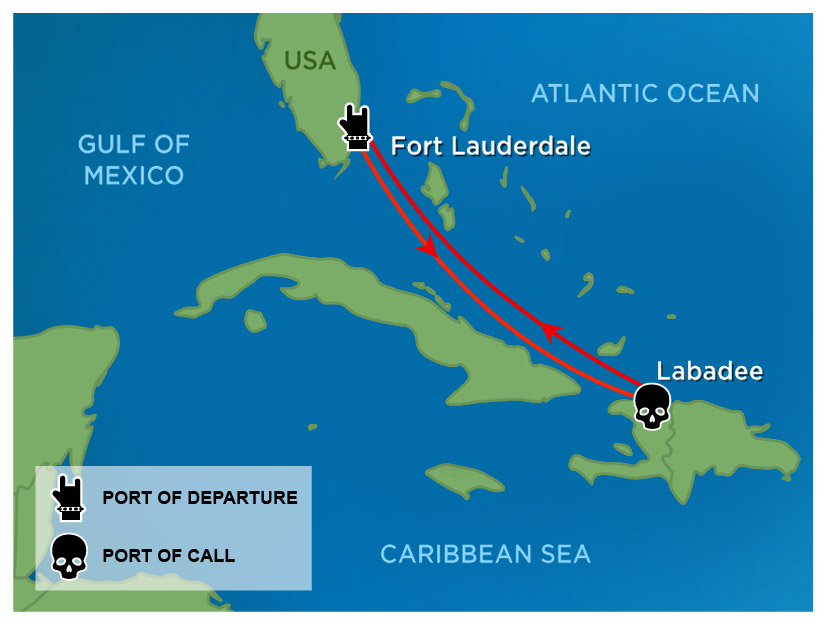
Route of 70000 Tons of Metal 2019

The ninth edition of 70000 Tons of Metal set sail on January 31 to February 4, 2019, from Fort Lauderdale, Florida to Labadee, Haiti and back. The event took place on the Royal Caribbean Independence of the Seas.

=== Line-up ===
Artists: Accept, Arkona, Atrocity, Bloodbath, Blood Red Throne, Bodyfarm, Carnation, Chontaraz, Convulse, Coroner, Cyhra, Dark Funeral, Delain, Dragony, Eluveitie, Ensiferum, Exmortus, Fleshgod Apocalypse, Gloryhammer, God Dethroned, Steve Grimmett's Grim Reaper, Heidevolk, In Vain, Internal Suffering, Kalmah, Kamelot, Krisiun, Masacre, Mayan, Mors Principium Est, Napalm Death, Ne Obliviscaris, Nekrogoblikon, Night Demon, Nile, Obituary, Onslaught, Paradise Lost, Perpetual Warfare, Persefone, Pestilence, Rage (feat. Lingua Mortis Orchestra), Raven, Riot V, Sodom, Soulfly, Subway to Sally, Svartsot, Temperance, The Black Dahlia Murder, Tiamat, Tristania, Twilight Force, Týr, Unleash the Archers, Van Canto, Vicious Rumors, Visions of Atlantis, Vomitory, Warbringer

=== Visitors and statistics ===
- Ship: Independence of the Seas
- Dates: January 31 – February 4, 2019
- Route: Port Everglades, Fort Lauderdale, Florida — Labadee, Haiti — Fort Lauderdale, Florida
- Number of guests: 3092 (73 countries represented)
- Musicians and crew: 1036
- Ship crew members: 1381
- Total number of persons on board: 5509

Countries represented: Andorra, Argentina, Australia, Austria, Belgium, Bolivia, Brazil, Bulgaria, Canada, Chile, China, Colombia, Costa Rica, Croatia, Cuba, Czech Republic, Denmark, Dominican Republic, Ecuador, El Salvador, Estonia, Finland, France, Georgia, Germany, Greece, Guatemala, Honduras, Hong Kong, Hungary, Iceland, India, Iran, Ireland, Israel, Italy, Japan, Latvia, Lebanon, Luxembourg, Mexico, Namibia, Netherlands, New Zealand, Nicaragua, Norway, Palau, Panama, Peru, Poland, Portugal, Romania, Russia, Saudi Arabia, Singapore, Slovakia, Slovenia, South Africa, Spain, Sri Lanka, Sweden, Switzerland, Syria, Trinidad and Tobago, Turkey, Ukraine, United Kingdom, Uruguay, United States, Uzbekistan, Venezuela

== 2020 ==
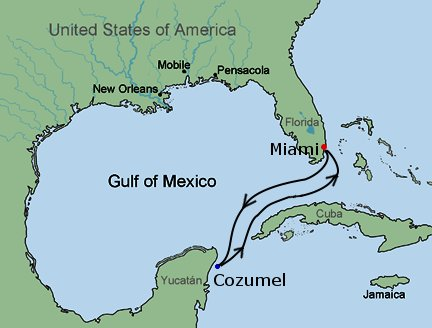
Route of 70000 Tons of Metal 2020

Round X of 70000 Tons of Metal set sail on January 7 to 11, 2020 from Fort Lauderdale, Florida to Cozumel, Mexico and back. The event took place on Royal Caribbean's Independence of the Seas.

=== Line-up ===
Artists: Aborted, Aeternam, Æther Realm, Archon Angel (first shows ever), Atheist, At the Gates, Axxis, Bloodbound, Brujeria, Candlemass, Carach Angren, Cattle Decapitation, Cruachan, Dark Matter, Devin Townsend, Edenbridge, Einherjer, Emperor, Epica, Ereb Altor, Exodus, Finntroll, Firstbourne, Flotsam and Jetsam, Ghost Ship Octavius, Grave Digger, Haggard, Havok, Ihsahn, Incantation, Kampfar, Kissin' Dynamite, Leaves' Eyes, Michael Schenker Fest, Moonsorrow, No Raza, November's Doom, Omnium Gatherum, Once Human, Origin, Orphaned Land, Possessed, Ross the Boss, Seven Witches, Soen, Sortilege, Spoil Engine, Stam1na, Striker (band), Suffocation, The Agonist, The Faceless, Toxik, Trollfest, Venom, Vio-lence, Whiplash, Wilderun, Wintersun, Without Waves, Zero Theorem

=== Visitors and statistics ===
- Ship: Independence of the Seas
- Dates: January 7–11, 2020
- Route: Port Everglades, Fort Lauderdale, Florida — Cozumel, Mexico — Fort Lauderdale, Florida
- Number of guests: 3028 (71 countries represented)
- Musicians and crew: 1040
- Ship crew members: 1377
- Total number of persons on board: 5445

Countries represented: Andorra, Argentina, Australia, Austria, Belarus, Belgium, Bermuda, Bolivia, Brazil, Bulgaria, Canada, Chile, China, Colombia, Costa Rica, Cuba, Czech Republic, Denmark, Dominican Republic, Ecuador, Egypt, El Salvador, Estonia, Finland, France, Germany, Greece, Guatemala, Honduras, Hong Kong, Hungary, Iran, Ireland, Israel, Italy, Japan, Lithuania, Luxembourg, Malta, Mexico, Netherlands, New Zealand, Nicaragua, Norway, Pakistan, Palau, Panama, Peru, Poland, Portugal, Romania, Russia, Saudi Arabia, Singapore, Slovakia, Slovenia, South Africa, Spain, Sri Lanka, Sweden, Switzerland, Trinidad and Tobago, Turkey, Ukraine, United Kingdom, Uruguay, United States, Venezuela

== 2021 ==
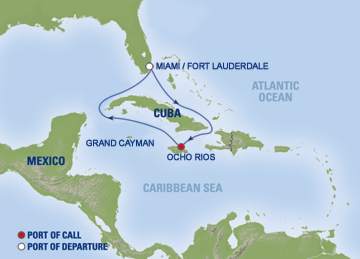
Route of 70000 Tons of Metal 2021

The 10th anniversary of 70000 Tons of Metal was scheduled to take place from January 7 to 11, sailing to Ocho Rios, Jamaica from Fort Lauderdale (Florida). It did not occur due to COVID-19.

== 2023 ==
Round 11 of 70000 Tons of Metal took place between January 30 and February 3, sailing from Miami to Bimini, The Bahamas on board the Freedom of the Seas.

=== Line-up ===
Artists: Abysmal Dawn, Amberian Dawn, Amorphis, Atrocity, Batushka, Belphegor, Bodyfarm, Cancer, Cryptosis, Cynic, Dark Tranquility, Dear Mother, Deathless Legacy, Destruction, DragonForce, Edge of Paradise, Eleine, Empress, Elvenking, Eshtadur, Evergrey, Fallujah, Feuerschwanz, Fractal Universe, Freedom Call, God Dethroned, He'ian, Hideous Divinity, Hypocrisy, Insomnium, Internal Bleeding, Iron Savior, Isole, Jungle Rot, Kamelot, Keep of Kalessin, Korpiklaani, Kreator, Manegarm, Melechesh, Nightmare, Nightwish, Nothgard, Novembre, Nuclear, Obscura, Oceans of Slumber, Osyron, Rotting Christ, Sight of Emptiness, Sirenia, Skiltron, The Crown, Uli Jon Roth, Vicious Rumors, Visions of Atlantis, Vreid, Warbringer, Wolfchant, Wormed

=== Visitors and statistics ===
- Ship: Freedom of the Seas
- Dates: January 30 – February 3, 2023
- Route: Miami, Florida — Bimini, Bahamas — Miami

Countries represented: Argentina, Australia, Austria, Belarus, Belgium, Bolivia, Brazil, Bulgaria, Canada, Chile, China, Colombia, Costa Rica, Cuba, Cyprus, Czech Republic, Denmark, Ecuador, Egypt, El Salvador, Estonia, Finland, France, Germany, Greece, Guatemala, Hong Kong, Hungary, India, Indonesia, Ireland, Israel, Italy, Japan, Lithuania, Luxembourg, Malta, Mexico, Netherlands, New Zealand, Nicaragua, Norway, Pakistan, Palau, Peru, Philippines, Poland, Portugal, Romania, Russia, Saudi Arabia, Singapore, Slovakia, Slovenia, South Africa, South Korea, Spain, Sri Lanka, Sweden, Switzerland, Taiwan, Trinidad and Tobago, Turkey, Ukraine, United Arab Emirates, United Kingdom, Uruguay, United States, Venezuela, Vietnam

== 2024 ==
Round 12 of 70000 Tons of Metal took place between January 29 and February 2, sailing from Miami to Puerto Plata, Dominican Republic on board the Freedom of the Seas.

=== Line-up ===
Artists: Aborted, ACOD, Angra, April Art, Arion, Avulsed, Batushka, Before the Dawn, Blind Guardian, Blood Red Throne, Carnation, Crypta, Dalriada, Decembre Noir, Disillusion, Dynazty, Edenbridge, Einherjer, Endseeker, Epica, Equilibrium, Fleshcrawl, Fleshgod Apocalypse, Graceless, Grave Digger, Heidevolk, I Am the Night, Infected Rain, Inhuman Condition, Iotunn, Kataklysm, Katatonia, Leaves' Eyes, Left-Ovr, Lich King, Lord of the Lost, Monstrosity, My Dying Bride, Mystic Prophecy, Nanowar of Steel, Nervosa, Noturnall, Omnium Gatherum, Pentagram Chile, Rising Steel, Saor, Scar Symmetry, Serenity, Shores of Null, Skyforger, Sodom, Temperance, The Halo Effect, Threshold, Tygers of Pan Tang, Unleashed, Victory, Vision Divine, Waltari, Warkings, Wind Rose, Wolfheart

=== Visitors and statistics ===
- Ship: Freedom of the Seas
- Dates: January 29 – February 2, 2024
- Route: Miami, Florida — Puerto Plata, Dominican Republic — Miami

Countries represented: 71

== 2025 ==
Round 13 of 70000 Tons of Metal took place between January 30 and February 3, sailing from Miami to Ocho Rios, Jamaica on board the Independence of the Seas.

=== Line-up ===
Artists: Abysmal Dawn, Arcturus, Benighted, Beyond Creation, Cabrakaan, Candlemass, Crownshift, Decapitated, Delain, Destinity, Dirkschneider, Emperor, Ex Deo, Fabulae Dramatis, Finntroll, Flotsam & Jetsam, Fractal Sun, HammerFall, Hate, Ihsahn, In Extremo, Incantation, Kalmah, Kissin’ Dynamite, Krisiun, Lutharo, Majestica, Matalobos, Metsatöll, Mork, Onslaught, Painful, Pessimist, Powerglove, Reaping Asmodeia, Samael, Septicflesh, Sepultura, Seven Kingdoms, Sonata Arctica, Stormruler, Stratovarius, Striker, Subway to Sally, Suffocation, Super Monster Party, Swallow the Sun, Symphony X, Tankard, Tenebrarum, The Dread Crew of Oddwood, The Kovenant, The Mourning, The Zenith Passage, Thy Antichrist, Total Death, Trollfest, Trouble, Twilight Force, Unleash the Archers, Warfield

=== Visitors and statistics ===
- Ship: Independence of the Seas
- Dates: January 30 – February 3, 2025
- Route: Miami, Florida — Ocho Rios, Jamaica — Miami, Florida

Countries represented: 81

== 2026 ==
Round 14 of 70000 Tons of Metal took place between January 29 and February 2, sailing from Miami to Nassau, Bahamas on board the Freedom of the Seas. Initially, the destination was announced to be Labadee, Haiti but was changed to Nassau due to the ongoing unrests in Haiti.

=== Line-up ===
Artists: Ad Infinitum, Amorphis, Anthrax, Arkona, Beast in Black, Bloodred Hourglass, Cemetery Skyline, Dark Tranquillity, Darkane, Dødheimsgard, Dragonland, Dust Bolt, Eluveitie, Ereb Altor, Firewind, Gama Bomb, Groza, Haggard, Harakiri for the Sky, Heathen, Hiraes, Hirax, Hour of Penance, Ignea, Illdisposed, Illumishade, In Mourning, Insomnium, Izegrim, Jag Panzer, Kamelot, Kanonenfieber, Orden Ogan, Paradise Lost, Persefone, Rhapsody of Fire, Royal Hunt, Satan, Saturnus, Seven Spires, Skeletal Remains, Skyclad, Soen, Soilwork, Suidakra, Tribulation, Týr, Vader, Vbo (Vice Business Only), Vio-Lence, Wind Rose, Wolf, Xandria.

=== Visitors and statistics ===
- Ship: Freedom of the Seas
- Dates: January 29 – February 2, 2026
- Route: Miami, Florida — Nassau, Bahamas — Miami, Florida

Countries represented: 72
