= Tarot (Æther Realm album) =

Studio album by Æther Realm
- Released: June 7, 2017
- Recorded: 2016
- Genres: Folk metal, melodic death metal
- Length: 73:30
- Label: Primitive Ways
- Producer: Kile Odell

Æther Realm chronology
| One Chosen by the Gods (2013) | Tarot (2017) | Redneck Vikings from Hell (2020) |

Professional ratings
Review scores
| Source | Rating |
|---|---|
| CJLO | 9.5/10 |
| Dead Rhetoric | 10/10 |

Tarot is the second studio album by American folk metal band Æther Realm, released on June 7, 2017 via Primitive Ways, and re-released on September 11, 2020 via Napalm Records. The songs of the album are all named after the Major Arcana deck in the Tarot card game. A playthrough video was released for the song "The Sun, The Moon, The Star", which is the band's longest track at over 19 minutes.

== Track listing ==
| No. | Title | Length |
|---|---|---|
| 1. | "The Fool" | 7:55 |
| 2. | "Tarot" | 4:23 |
| 3. | "The Tower" | 2:51 |
| 4. | "King of Cups" | 5:00 |
| 5. | "Death" | 4:28 |
| 6. | "The Chariot" | 6:24 |
| 7. | "The Devil" | 8:45 |
| 8. | "The Emperor" | 2:49 |
| 9. | "Strength" | 6:17 |
| 10. | "Temperance" | 5:28 |
| 11. | "The Sun, the Moon, the Star" | 19:10 |

== Personnel ==
- Vincent Jones – lead vocals, bass, keyboards, orchestrations
- Heinrich Arnold – guitars, co-lead vocals
- Donny Burbage – guitars
- Tyler Gresham – drums
