= Epigone =

Studio album by Wilderun
- Released: January 7, 2022
- Recorded: January–February 2021
- Studios: More Sound Studios, Syracuse, New York
- Genres: Folk metal; progressive metal; symphonic metal; progressive rock
- Length: 62:40
- Label: Century Media

Wilderun chronology
Veil of Imagination (2019)	Epigone (2022)

Singles from Epigone
- 1. "Distraction I" Released: November 16, 2021; 2. "Identifier" Released: December 4, 2021

Professional ratings
Review scores
Source	Rating
Distorted Sound	9/10
Metal Injection	9.5/10

Epigone is the fourth album by American progressive metal band Wilderun. The album was released on January 7, 2022 via Century Media Records. It is noted to have a different tone compared to their previous album Veil of Imagination, with bassist Dan Müller stating that "Veil of Imagination used an abundance of major keys and Epigone is almost the opposite of that and that’s kind of why it sounds heavier and darker".

== Track listing ==
No.	Title	Length
1.	"Exhaler"	4:44
2.	"Woolgatherer"	14:11
3.	"Passenger"	9:58
4.	"Identifier"	11:33
5.	"Ambition"	3:40
6.	"Distraction: 1. "I" (4:56); 2. "II" (5:40); 3. "III" (5:40); 4. "Nulla" (3:18); "	19:34
Total length:		62:40

Bonus track
No.	Title	Length
7.	"Everything in Its Right Place" (Radiohead cover)	3:56
Total length:		66:36

== Personnel ==
- Evan Berry – vocals, guitars
- Joe Gettler – guitars
- Wayne Ingram – guitars, orchestrations
- Dan Müller – bass, orchestrations, synths
- Jon Teachey – drums
