= One Chosen by the Gods =

Studio album by Æther Realm
- Released: January 8, 2013
- Recorded: 2012
- Genres: Folk metal, melodic death metal
- Length: 42:05
- Label: Primitive Ways
- Producer: Jamie King

Æther Realm chronology
| One Chosen by the Gods (2013) | Tarot (2017) |

Professional ratings
Review scores
| Source | Rating |
|---|---|
| The Circle Pit | 8.5/10 |
| Metalfan.nl | 82/100 |

One Chosen by the Gods is the debut studio album by American folk metal band Æther Realm, released on January 8, 2013 via Primitive Ways. The album was produced by Jamie King, known for his production work with Between the Buried and Me, The Human Abstract, and Wretched, though he would be replaced by Kyle Odell for subsequent albums.

== Track listing ==
| No. | Title | Length |
|---|---|---|
| 1. | "Journey of Discovery" | 2:10 |
| 2. | "Hourglass" | 4:51 |
| 3. | "Æther Realm" | 3:49 |
| 4. | "Swampwitch" | 4:36 |
| 5. | "One Chosen by the Gods" | 7:06 |
| 6. | "Ravensong" | 3:07 |
| 7. | "Winter's Grasp" | 5:17 |
| 8. | "Odin Will Provide" | 4:59 |
| 9. | "Oak" | 6:10 |

== Personnel ==
- Vincent Jones – lead vocals, bass, keyboards, orchestrations
- Heinrich Arnold – guitars, co-lead vocals
- Jack Dougherty – guitars
- Tyler Gresham – drums
