= Olden Tales & Deathly Trails =

Studio album by Wilderun
- Released: September 21, 2012
- Recorded: May–June 2012
- Studios: More Sound Studios, Syracuse, New York
- Genres: Progressive metal; folk metal; symphonic metal
- Length: 51:08
- Producer: Jocko

Wilderun chronology
Olden Tales & Deathly Trails (2012)	Sleep at the Edge of the Earth (2015)

Professional ratings
Review scores
Source	Rating
The Circle Pit	8.5/10
Der Metal Krieger	9/10
Metal Temple	10/10

Olden Tales & Deathly Trails is the debut album by American progressive metal band Wilderun. The album was released on September 21, 2012.

== Track listing ==
No.	Title	Length
1.	"The Cracking Glow"	2:16
2.	"Suncatcher"	7:40
3.	"How Stands the Glass Around?"	4:43
4.	"Storm Along"	7:42
5.	"Vaunting Veins"	8:13
6.	"The Coasts of High Barbaree"	7:39
7.	"The Dying Californian"	12:55
Total length:		51:08

== Personnel ==
- Evan Berry – vocals, electric and acoustic guitars
- Wayne Ingram – electric guitars, orchestrations, backing vocals
- Dan Müller – bass, orchestrations, synths, backing vocals
- Jon Teachey – drums, backing vocals
