= Redneck Vikings from Hell =

Studio album by Æther Realm
- Released: May 1, 2020
- Recorded: 2019
- Genres: Folk metal, melodic death metal
- Length: 53:24
- Label: Napalm
- Producer: Kile Odell

Æther Realm chronology
Tarot (2017)	Redneck Vikings from Hell (2020)	Season of Bloodshed (2026)

Professional ratings
Review scores
Source	Rating
Blabbermouth.net	8.5/10
Dead Rhetoric	9.5/10
Distorted Sound	8/10
Metal.de	6/10
Metal Hammer Germany	2.5/7
Rock Hard	7/10
Sonic Perspectives	9/10

Redneck Vikings from Hell is the third studio album by American folk metal band Æther Realm, released on May 1, 2020 via Napalm Records. The album has received positive feedback from reviewers. It is noted to contain shorter and more condensed songs, compared to some songs from previous albums that range from 6 to 19 minutes in length. A music video was released for the song "TMHC", which stands for "Tiny Metal Hand Crew".

== Track listing ==
No.	Title	Length
1.	"Redneck Vikings from Hell"	3:37
2.	"Goodbye"	4:57
3.	"Lean into the Wind"	3:51
4.	"Hunger"	4:34
5.	"Guardian"	4:18
6.	"One Hollow Word"	5:24
7.	"She's Back"	2:33
8.	"Slave to the Riff"	4:24
9.	"Cycle"	4:34
10.	"TMHC"	4:12
11.	"Craft and the Creator"	11:00

== Personnel ==
- Vincent Jones – lead vocals, bass, keyboards, orchestrations
- Heinrich Arnold – guitars, co-lead vocals
- Donny Burbage – guitars
- Tyler Gresham – drums
