= Cripper =

German thrash metal band

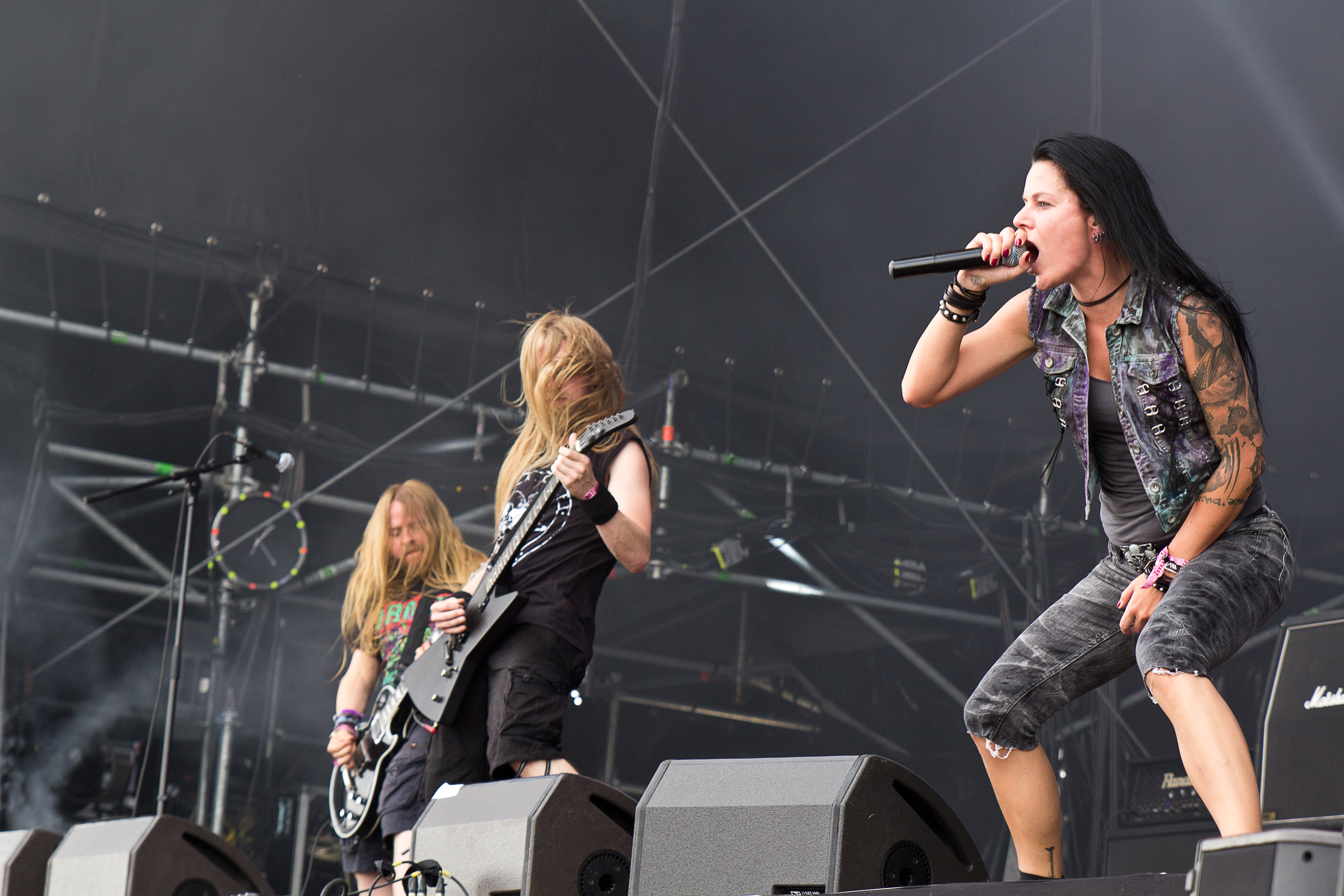
- Cripper performing in 2015

Background information
- Origin: Hanover, Germany
- Genre: Thrash metal
- Years active: 2005–2018
- Label: SAOL Records
- Members: Britta Görtz; Christian Bröhenhorst; Jonathan Stenger; Gerrit Mohrmann; Dennis Weber
- Past members: See below
- Website: cripper.de

Cripper was a German thrash metal band from Hanover, Lower Saxony. They were formed in 2005 by musicians Christian Bröhenhorst and Jonathan Stenger and released five studio albums before splitting up in 2018.

== History ==
In 2004, guitarists Christian Bröhenhorst and Jonathan Stenger had the idea to create a band when they were studying at Hildesheim and in late 2004, singer Britta Görtz joined. Then the band was completed with bassist Erik Hess and drummer Dennis Weber. Months later bassist Hess was replaced by Thomas Maiwald and after by Sören Becker.

In 2006 the band released their first EP titled Killer Escort Service and in the same year Cripper played at Metaldays in Slovenia. Next year, in 2007, the band released their debut studio album, named Freak Inside, mastered by musician Andy Classen from Holy Moses. Along with bands Hatred and Spectre Dragon they toured at the "Triple-Thrash-Threat" through Germany. In 2008, Becker was replaced by Bastian Helwig and toured again with Hatred on "Lost World Order" tour in Germany. In 2009 Cripper released their second studio album called Devil Reveals, was present at Wacken Open Air 2009 and in spring 2010 supported Overkill on their Killfest-Tour through Europe. Later in 2011 they traveled to the Caribbean to play at the biggest floating metal festival ever, the 70000 Tons of Metal.

Cripper released a third studio album in 2012, titled Antagonist. This time bassist Bastian Helwig left the band and was finally replaced by Gerrit Mohrmann. In 2014, Cripper played again at the fourth version of 70000 Tons of Metal.

== Members ==
=== Final lineup ===
- Britta Görtz – vocals (2005–2018)
- Christian Bröhenhorst – guitar (2005–2018)
- Jonathan Stenger – guitar (2005–2018)
- Gerrit Mohrmann – bass (2012–2018)
- Dennis Weber – drums (2005–2018)

=== Former members ===
- Erik Hess – bass (2005)
- Thomas Maiwald – bass (2005–2006)
- Sören Becker – bass (2006–2008)
- Bastian Helwig – bass (2008–2012)

== Discography ==
=== Studio albums ===
- Freak Inside (2007)
- Devil Reveals (2009)
- Antagonist (2012)
- Hyëna (2014, Metal Blade Records)
- Follow Me: Kill! (2017, Metal Blade Records)

=== EPs ===
- Killer Escort Service (2006)
