= Sleep at the Edge of the Earth =

Studio album by Wilderun
- Released: April 7, 2015
- Recorded: 2014–2015
- Studios: More Sound Studios, Syracuse, New York
- Genres: Folk metal; progressive metal; melodic death metal; symphonic metal
- Length: 54:10

Wilderun chronology
Olden Tales & Deathly Trails (2012)	Sleep at the Edge of the Earth (2015)	Veil of Imagination (2019)

Professional ratings
Review scores
Source	Rating
Dead Rhetoric	10/10
Eternal Terror	6/6
Ghost Cult Magazine	8/10
Metal Temple	10/10

Sleep at the Edge of the Earth is the second album by American progressive metal band Wilderun. The album was released on April 7, 2015. A rearranged version of "Hope and Shadow" was released on May 19, 2020.

== Track listing ==
No.	Title	Length
1.	"Dust and Crooked Thoughts"	2:55
2.	"Ash Memory: 1. "Part I: And So Opens the Earth" (5:37); 2. "Part II: Hope and Shadow" (3:04); 3. "Part III: Bite the Wound" (5:22); 4. "Part IV: The Faintest Echo" (5:40); "	19:43
3.	"The Garden of Fire"	9:50
4.	"Linger"	8:00
5.	"The Means to Preserve"	11:02
6.	"Sleep at the Edge of the Earth"	2:40
Total length:		54:10

== Personnel ==
- Evan Berry – vocals, guitars
- Joe Gettler – guitars
- Wayne Ingram – guitars, orchestrations
- Dan Müller – bass, orchestrations, synths
- Jon Teachey – drums
