= Back to the Noose =

Studio album by Swashbuckle
- Released: July 24, 2009
- Genre: Death metal, thrash metal
- Length: 41:56
- Label: Nuclear Blast Records

Swashbuckle chronology
| Crewed by the Damned (2006) | Back to the Noose (2009) | Crime Always Pays (2010) |

Professional ratings
Review scores
| Source | Rating |
|---|---|
| AllMusic | 3/5 stars |
| Rock Sound | 7/10 |
| Sputnikmusic | 3.5/5 |

Back to the Noose is an album by Swashbuckle, released in 2009.

== Critical reception ==
Rock Sound wrote that the album, "though still employing plenty of galloping bass lines and a seafaring lyric or two, is happy to dive into thrashier seas on a few occasions." AllMusic wrote: "Those whose appetite for high-speed, staccato riffing, blastbeats, and growling is nearly insatiable will enjoy this, and there are a few nice guitar solos scattered here and there, but it's not a must-hear by any stretch of the imagination."

== Track listing ==
1. "Hoist the Mainsail" 1:06
2. "Scurvy Back" 3:20
3. "Back to the Noose" 2:32
4. "Cloudy With a Chance of Piracy" 1:19
5. "We Sunk Your Battleship" 0:54
6. "Rounds of Rum" 2:35
7. "Carnivale Boat Ride" 1:57
8. "Rime of the Haggard Mariner" 2:00
9. "Cruise Ship Terror" 2:48
10. "No Prey No Pay" 2:25
11. "La Leyenda" 2:05
12. "Splash-N-Thrash" 2:28
13. "The Grog Box" 1:29
14. "The Tradewinds" 2:00
15. "Attack" 0:43
16. "Peg-Leg Stomp" 2:37
17. "Whirlpit" 0:42
18. "All Seemed Fine Until" 0:55
19. "It Came From the Deep" 4:39
20. "Shipwrecked" 2:19
21. "Sharkbait" 1:03

== Personnel ==
- Admiral Nobeard – Vocals, Bass guitar
- Commodore Redrum – Guitars, backing vocals
- Captain Crashride – Drums
