= Swashbuckle (band) =

American pirate metal band

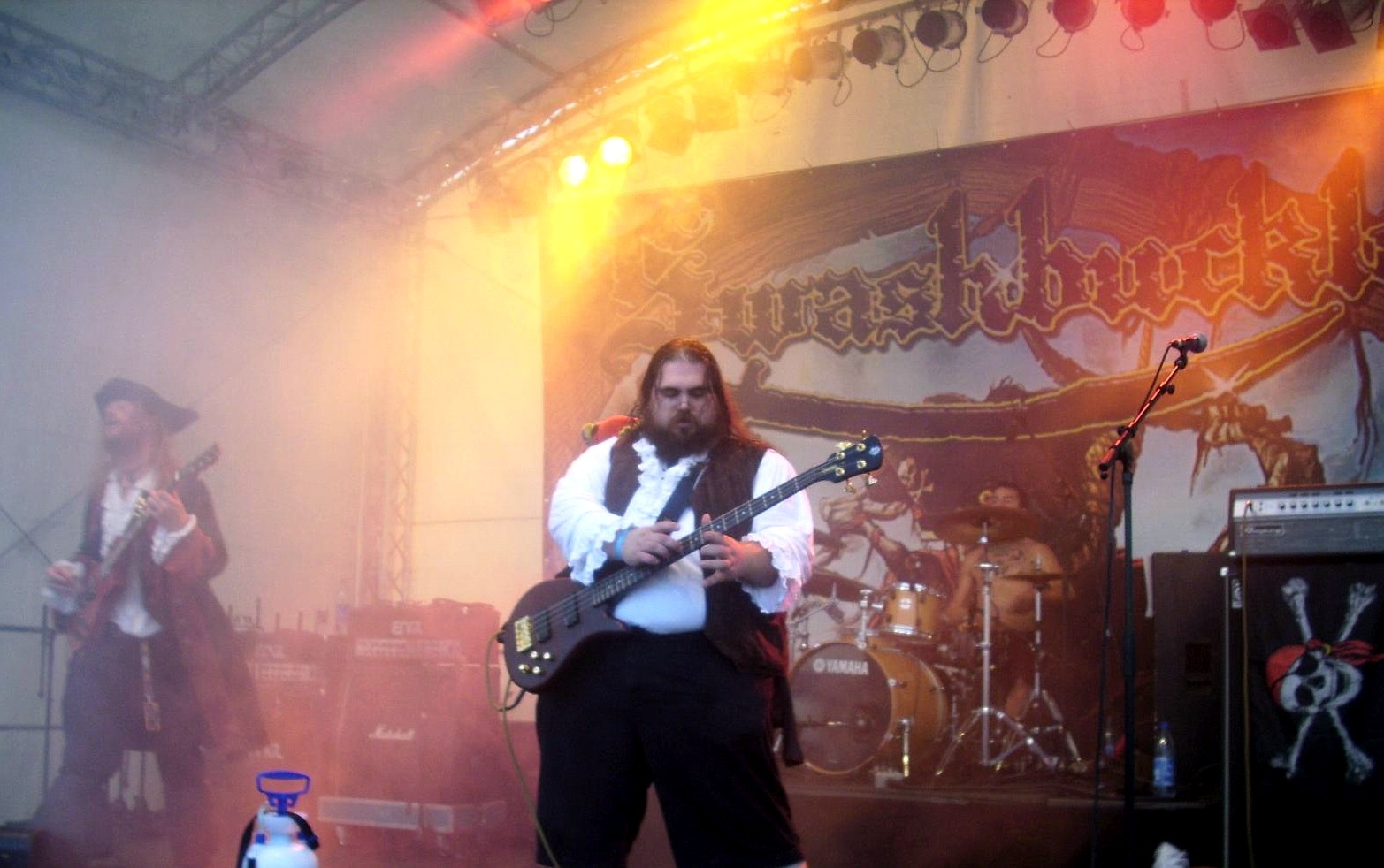
- Swashbuckle at Wacken Open Air 2009

Background information
- Origin: Trenton, New Jersey, U.S.
- Genres: Pirate metal, thrash metal, death metal
- Years active: 2005–present
- Labels: Nuclear Blast, Unsigned/Independent
- Members: Admiral Nobeard; Commodore Redrum; Eric W. Brown
- Past members: Captain Crashride; Rowin' Joe Po; Cabinboy Arsewhipe; Bootsmann Collins

Swashbuckle is an American pirate metal/thrash metal band based in Plainsboro, New Jersey. They were formerly signed to Nuclear Blast Records. Formed in 2005, the band is known for its pirate image and comedic stage performances.

== History ==
Swashbuckle was formed in early 2005, when bassist Patrick Henry and guitarist Justin Greczyn met at a Red Lobster and realized their mutual love for thrash metal and pirates. They formed a band and released a demo in early 2005. After they found drummer Mike Soganic and guitarist Joe Potash, they released the Yo Ho Demo later that year. The band members took on the stage names of Admiral Nobeard (Henry), Commodore Redrum (Greczyn), Captain Crashride (Soganic), and Rowin' Joe Po (Potash).

Their debut album, Crewed by the Damned, was self-released in 2006. Shortly after, Potash quit the group to join New Jersey thrash metal band Eliminator. The band toured North America in August 2007. They completed the North American Paganfest tour alongside Korpiklaani, Primordial, Moonsorrow, and Blackguard in April and May 2009. They completed the European Paganfest tour alongside Korpiklaani, Die Apokalyptischen Reiter, Unleashed, Alestorm, and Ex Deo in September 2009. They appeared on the Monsters of Death tour in November and December 2009 alongside Vader, Decrepit Birth, Warbringer, The Amenta, and Augury. They appeared on Tour From Afar alongside Ensiferum also in November 2009. They toured alongside Heaven Shall Burn, Caliban, Dark Tranquility, and Dealock in Europe as part of the Darkness over Xmas tour in December 2009. They toured alongside Korpiklaani, Týr and White Wizzard in January 2010 and supported Hypocrisy on a North American tour during May 2010. Swashbuckle also went on tour as a supporting act for Soilwork's "Panic Over North America Tour", along with Death Angel, Augury, and Mutiny Within.

Swashbuckle performed at the 20th Anniversary of the Wacken Open Air Festival in the summer of 2009 and have also appeared at the Legacy Open Air Festival, The Summer Nights Open Air Festival, and the Metal Days Open Air Festival.

In 2010, Swashbuckle parted ways with drummer Captain Crashride (Mike Soganic) who went on to join Non-Stop. Bootsmann Collins (Paul Christiansen) was announced as his replacement. Soon after this, they began working on their new album entitled Crime Always Pays, set for a September release.

Crime Always Pays was released by Nuclear Blast in September 2010. The band also took part in the 70000 Tons of Metal Festival along with other well known acts such as Amon Amarth, Exodus, Fear Factory, Sabaton, Sodom, Nevermore, Testament, Obituary, Death Angel and Ensiferum. As of 2011, Bootsmann Collins has been replaced by Legendary Pirate King Eric "The" Brown. In February 2014, Swashbuckle once again was invited to set sail as performers on the 70000 Tons of Metal Festival cruise.

In August 2014, Swashbuckle released the vinyl recording disc release We Hate the Sea EP on Get This Right Records.

Swashbuckle tune their instruments to D-standard tuning.

== Band members ==
=== Current members ===
- Admiral Nobeard (Patrick Henry) – lead vocals, bass (2005–present)
- Commodore Redrum (Justin Greczyn) – guitars, backing vocals, keyboards (2005–present)
- Legendary Pirate King Eric "The" Brown (Eric W. Brown) – drums (2011–present)

=== Former members ===
- Captain Crashride (Mike Soganic) – drums (2005–2010)
- Rowin' Joe Po (Joe Potash) – guitars (2005–2006)
- Cabinboy Arsewhipe (Ryan Hemphill)- keyboards (2005)
- Bootsmann Collins (Paul Christiansen) – drums (2010–2011)

== Discography ==
- Crewed by the Damned (2006)
- Back to the Noose (2009)
- Crime Always Pays… (2010)
- We Hate the Sea EP (EP) (2014)
