= Veil of Imagination =

Studio album by Wilderun
- Released: November 1, 2019
- Recorded: February–March 2018
- Studios: More Sound Studios, Syracuse, New York
- Genres: Symphonic metal; progressive death metal; folk metal
- Length: 66:13
- Label: Century Media (re-release)
- Producers: Andrew Greacen, Justin Spaulding

Wilderun chronology
Sleep at the Edge of the Earth (2015)	Veil of Imagination (2019)	Epigone (2022)

Singles from Veil of Imagination
- 1. "Far from Where Dreams Unfurl" Released: 18 September 2019; 2. "The Tyranny of Imagination" Released: 17 October 2019

Professional ratings
Review scores
Source	Rating
Metal Temple	9/10

Veil of Imagination is the third album by American progressive metal band Wilderun. The album was independently released on November 1, 2019. It was then re-released on August 7, 2020 via Century Media Records. "The Tyranny of Imagination" was released as a single in advance on October 16, 2019. The 2020 re-release includes a bonus cover of "Seventh Son of a Seventh Son" by Iron Maiden.

== Track listing ==
No.	Title	Length
1.	"The Unimaginable Zero Summer"	14:32
2.	"O Resolution!"	6:35
3.	"Sleeping Ambassadors of the Sun"	6:31
4.	"Scentless Core (Budding)"	3:32
5.	"Far from Where Dreams Unfurl"	8:28
6.	"Scentless Core (Fading)"	5:21
7.	"The Tyranny of Imagination"	9:18
8.	"When the Fire and the Rose Were One"	11:56
Total length:		66:13

2020 re-release bonus track
No.	Title	Length
9.	"Seventh Son of a Seventh Son" (Iron Maiden cover)	10:19
Total length:		76:32

== Personnel ==
- Evan Berry – vocals, guitars
- Joe Gettler – guitars
- Wayne Ingram – guitars, orchestrations
- Dan Müller – bass, orchestrations, synths
- Jon Teachey – drums
