= Æther Realm =

American melodic death metal band

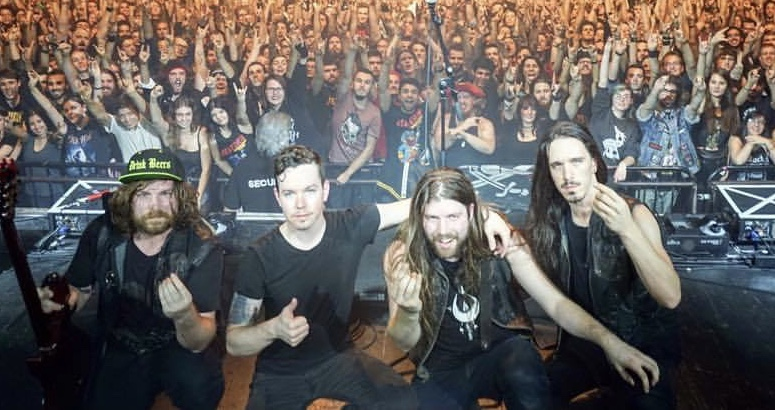

Background information
- Origin: Greenville, North Carolina, U.S.
- Genres: Melodic death metal, folk metal
- Years active: 2010–present
- Label: Napalm Records
- Spinoff of: Sakrament
- Members: Vincent Jones; Heinrich Yoshio; Tyler Gresham; Chris Jones
- Past members: George Yiznitsky; Jack Rodriguez-Dougherty; Donny Burbage
- Website: label.napalmrecords.com/aether-realm

Æther Realm is an American metal band from Greenville, North Carolina. They play a blend of melodic death metal and folk metal, with lyrical themes of fantasy and mythology. The band's influences include Wintersun, Alestorm, Dark Tranquility, Insomnium, In Flames, Soilwork, Ensiferum, Týr, Omnium Gatherum, Kalmah, Turisas, and Children of Bodom. They have been active since 2010, and have released three studio albums, with a fourth one to be released in 2026.

== History ==
In 2010, Vincent Jones, Heinrich Arnold, and George Yiznitsky began Æther Realm as a side project to their prog-thrash band Sakrament. They opened for Finntroll and Ensiferum a year later.

Their second studio album, Tarot, featured guest vocals provided by Christopher Bowes of Scottish metal band Alestorm, orchestral arrangement by Dan Müller of Wilderun, and a 19-minute finale "The Sun, the Moon, the Star". In 2017, Æther Realm toured Europe with Alestorm and Troldhaugen, and headlined Pocono Folk Metal Festival. The band was signed to Napalm Records in 2018.

Æther Realm released their third studio album, Redneck Vikings from Hell, in 2020. It will be followed by their upcoming fourth album, Season of Bloodshed, scheduled to be released on December 11, 2026.

Frontman Vincent Jones was also a member of extreme metal supergroup Wizardthrone with Christopher Bowes of Alestorm and Gloryhammer. After an obscene group chat between members of Gloryhammer was leaked, Vincent Jones released a statement on August 26, 2021, distancing himself professionally from Bowes and suspending his involvement in any bands and tours involving Bowes including Wizardthrone, as well as urging Bowes to make his own statement.

== Band members ==
Current

- Vincent Jones – lead vocals, bass, orchestrations (2010–present)
- Heinrich Yoshio – guitars, co-lead vocals (2010–present)
- Tyler Gresham – drums (2010–present)
- Chris Jones – guitars (2025–present)

Former

- George Yiznitsky – guitars (2010–2011)
- Jack Rodriguez-Dougherty – guitars (2011–2014)
- Donny Burbage – guitars (2014–2025)

== Discography ==
=== Albums ===
- One Chosen by the Gods (2013)
- Tarot (2017)
- Redneck Vikings from Hell (2020)
- Season of Bloodshed (2026)

=== Demo EP ===
- Odin Will Provide (2011)

=== Singles ===
- "The Magician" (2013)
- "The Chariot" (2015)
- "Goodbye" (2020)
- "Should I?" (2023)
- "The Blood is Calling" (2026)
