= Izegrim =

Dutch metal band

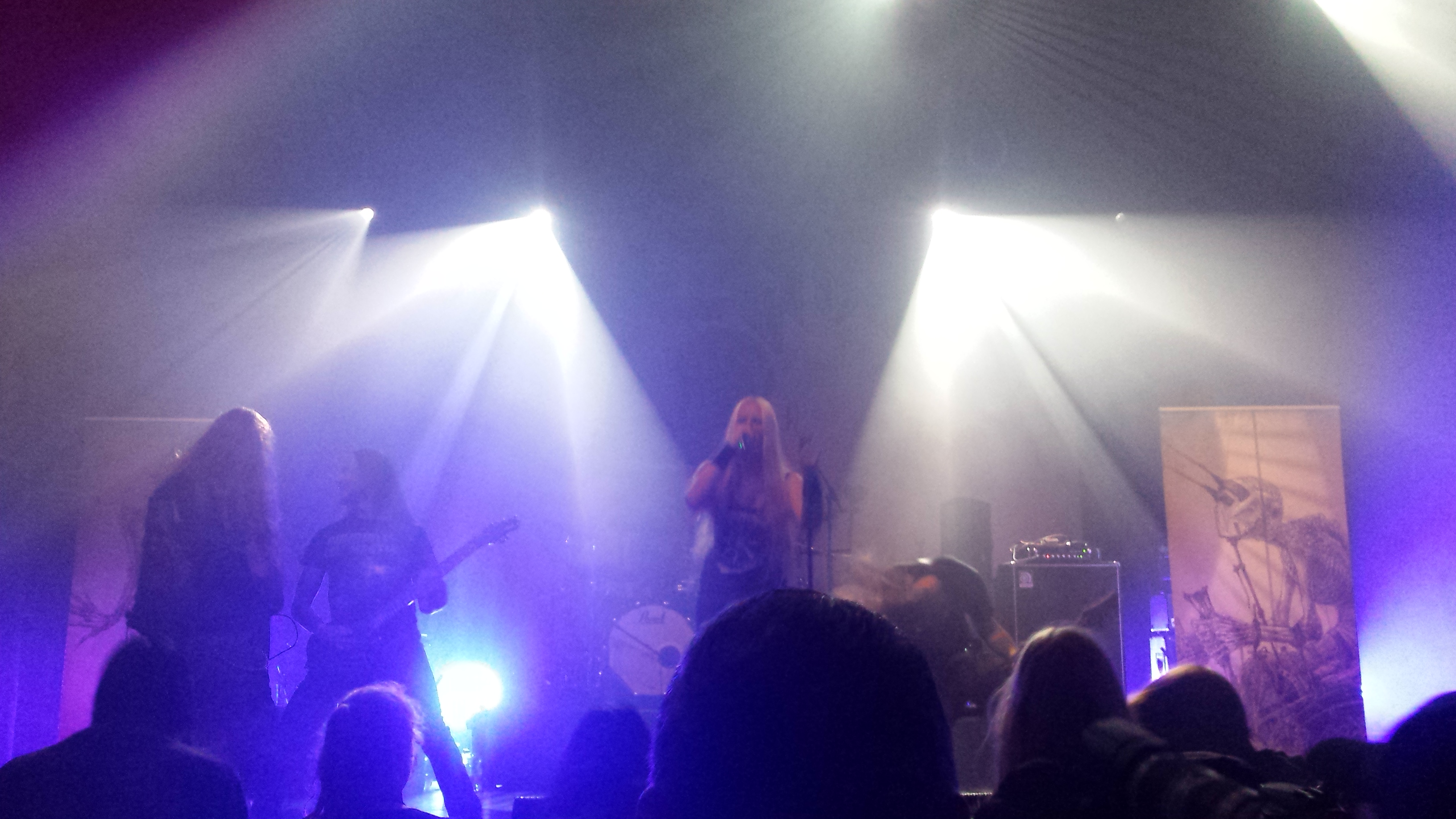
- Izegrim performing in 2018

Background information
- Origin: Zutphen, Netherlands
- Genres: Thrash metal, death metal
- Years active: 1996–2020, 2025–present
- Label: Listenable Records
- Members: Marloes Voskuil; Jeroen Wechgelaer; Bart van Ginkel; Ivo Maarhuis
- Past members: Joep van Leeuwen; Niels Donninger; Anita Luderer; Kristien Dros; Anita Borst; Corvin Keurhorst; Carsten Altena; Jeroen van Heuvelen; Bas Wijnbergen
- Website: http://www.izegrim.nl

Izegrim is a Dutch metal band from Zutphen, founded in 1996 by guitarist Jeroen Wechgelaer (ex-Deluzion) and drummer Joep van Leeuwen (ex-Solstice). Wechgelaer is the only remaining original member.

== History ==
=== 1996-2005 ===
Izegrim was founded in 1996 in Zutphen by guitarist Jeroen Wechgelaer and drummer Joep van Leeuwen (Ränz). Joep invited Kristien Dros (Krisz) to the band as the lead singer, who drew attention by singing with a remarkable grunt. Initially the band experimented with keys too, but after the departure of Anita Luderer (Anita L.) the traditional band line-up (vocals, guitar, bass and drums) was re-assumed.

Drummer Joep was at that stage responsible for the lyrics, which were sung by vocalist Krisz. Guitarist Niels Donninger, who replaced Jeroen van Heuvelen after only a few months, received an offer to play with the band Goddess of Desire and he left Izegrim in 1999. He was then replaced for a short time by Corvin Keurhorst, to be replaced in turn by Carsten Altena in 2000. In 2004, bassist and backing vocalist Anita Borst quit. She was replaced for the same duties by Marloes Voskuil.

=== 2005-present ===
In 2005, guitarist Bart van Ginkel entered the band to replace Carsten. His fast, aggressive playing style and his ability to play fast, melodic solos enabled the band to grow to a more seasoned sound. When in 2008 drummer Joep was replaced by Ivo Maarhuis and the vocals were handed over form Kristien to bassist Marloes Voskuil, the band underwent their last significant metamorphosis. The lyrics dealt with different content and the members no longer used aliases. This line-up provided the opportunity to give full priority to the band. Due to this, Izegrim started to play more and bigger festivals, on both national and international stages, among which a European tour with the English band Onslaught. In 2009, Izegrim recorded the EP Point Of No Return, with which they got a contract with the French label Listenable Records. Under Listenable Records the band has thus far released three albums, Code Of Consequences (2011), Congress of the Insane (2013) and The Ferryman's End (2016).

== Line-up ==
=== Current members ===
- Jeroen Wechgelaer - guitar (1996–2020, 2025–present)
- Marloes Voskuil - bass (2004–2018, 2025–present), lead vocals (2008–2020, 2025–present)
- Bart van Ginkel - guitar (2005–2020, 2025–present)
- Ivo Maarhuis - drums (2008–2020, 2025–present)

=== Previous members ===
- Joep van Leeuwen - drums (1996–2008)
- Kristien Dros - lead vocals (1996–2008)
- Anita Borst - bass (1996–2004)
- Niels Donninger - guitar (1996–1999)
- Corvin Keurhorst - guitar (1999–2000)
- Carsten Altena - guitar (2000–2005)
- Bas Wijnbergen - bass (2018–2020)

== Discography ==
=== Studio albums ===
- 2002: Guidelines for Genocide
- 2008: Tribute to Totalitarianism
- 2011: Code of Consequences
- 2013: Congress of the Insane
- 2016: The Ferryman's End

=== EPs ===
- 1999: Bird of Prey
- 2005: New World Order
- 2009: Point of No Return
- 2018: Beheaded By Trust

=== Demos ===
- 1998: Most Evil
- 2002: Izegrim
