= Squealer (band) =

American metal band

Squealer is a German power/thrash metal band. They have released nine albums, among which six came through the label AFM Records and the last two ones on Pride & Joy Music.

The founder of AFM Records, Andy "Henner" Allendörfer, was also the frontman of Squealer. On 16 January 2005, Allendörfer died in a road accident, aged 38. After this, the band was known as Squealer A.D. for a time, with Gus Chambers as the singer, before reverting to Squealer.

== Discography ==
- Make Your Day (1992)
- Wrong Time, Wrong Place? (1995)
- The Prophecy (1999)
- Made for Eternity (2000)
- Under the Cross (2002)
- Confrontation Street (2006)
- The Circle Shuts (2008)
- Behind Closed Doors (2018)
- Insanity (2020)
