= Fatal Smile =

Swedish hard rock band

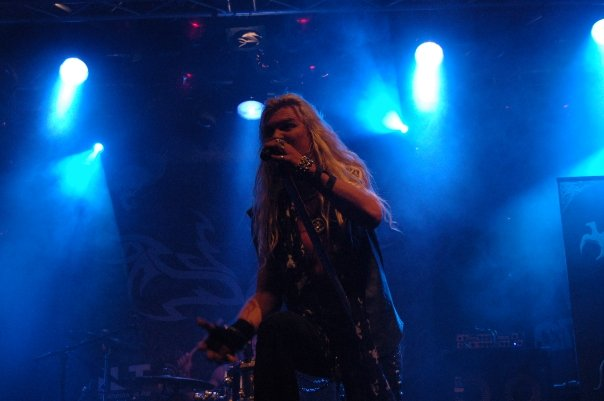
- Fatal Smile in 2009

Background information
- Origin: Stockholm, Sweden
- Genres: Hard rock, Heavy metal, glam metal, shock rock
- Years active: 1995–present
- Labels: GMR Music Group, FS Records, Spectra Music Group, Locomotive Records
- Members: Blade; Alx; Philty; MR.Y
- Past members: Tomas Lindgren; Markus Anderson; Zteff; H.B. Anderson
- Website: www.fatalsmile.com

Fatal Smile is a Swedish hard rock band formed in Katrineholm in 1995 by the guitarist and main songwriter Mr Y. Around 1996 Mr Y and the bass player Marcus Johansson joined forces and started playing music together. Later they moved up to Stockholm in order to give music a shot full-time. Bands that Fatal Smile has listed as influences include – among others – Whitesnake, Dio, Accept, Metallica, W.A.S.P and Dokken.

The band recorded a demo with two songs ("Hip M.F/Sad & Gone") in 1999. The first real lineup of the band consisted of Mr Y on guitar, Markus Johansson on bass, Robin Lagerquist (earlier in Six Pack Solution) on drums as well as H.B. Anderson, who joined year 2000, on vocals. H.B. Anderson had earlier been active in the bands Scudiero and Token.

The summer of 2001 the band started working on their debut record. The first song that the band wrote together was "Beyond Reality". The producer of choice was Jonas Östman, who earlier had worked with Yngwie Malmsteen. The recording and mixing took six weeks and the album was released early 2002. Beyond Reality was also the name of the record, and it was released by GMR Music. The album included the bonus song Hip M.F. that was regularly played at rock clubs in Stockholm, and since then has become one of the obvious songchoices during concerts. A music video for the song Bad Kharma was recorded at "Göta Källare", under the direction of Poppe Linge. The video was played quite frequently on ZTV (Swedish channel), but not on MTV – as it was seen as too naughty. During the summer of 2003 the band went on a small USA tour and played a show at "Metal Meltdown Fest" in New Jersey, among others.

With the success of the following record "Neo Natural Freaks" which was released in 2006, the band was gaining more and more fans, both in- and outside of Sweden. During this time the band was touring diligently, and played as an opening act for the likes of W.A.S.P and Winger. One change in the lineup was made at this point as Tomas Lindgren replaced Robin on drums.

The single "Learn, Love, Hate" (released 2005) was frequently played on the radio and made it into the top three in Sweden. The following tour brought the band to Japan for shows in cities like Tokyo, Nagoya and Osaka.

The band was already working on a new record. A record that would sound much heavier than the two previous ones. The year 2007 Mr Y decided to recruit a new singer – Blade. Alx played the bass and ZTeff played the drums. A completely new lineup that would give the band a different and rawer sound than the previous records.

The album "World Domination" was released in 2008. This album was mixed by the experienced Michael Wagener, who earlier had worked with Ozzy Osbourne and Skid Row. The band describes the album as being a basic 'rock and roll' album. The album received positive reviews and that in turn intensified the following touring.

The music video to the single "S.O.B" was played frequently in Sweden and Europe. The album was nominated for "Album of the Year" at the "Swedish Metal Awards" (category Glam/Sleaze) and the magazine "Sweden Rock Magazine" had featured it as the album of the month.

The success gave the band more and more opportunities to play a festivals. Over 350 gigs were played, including ones at "Wacken Rocks South", "Hard Rock Hell" and "Rock Weekend".

The band members refer to this period as the mayhem years. On one occasion, the bass player Alx got badly hurt from falling off the stage at a gig in Köpenhamn.

The self-produced album 21st Century Freaks was released on 14 May 2012. 22 completed songs had been reduced to 11 for the album. The album took 11 months to finish. The first single from the album was "Welcome to the Freakshow", which spawned the band's most costly music video to date. The single reached gold status in June 2012. The drummer Philthy is playing drums on the record. The earlier drummer was simply tired of the extensive touring. During the audition phase, over 300 applications were received from around the world.

On the three-year-anniversary of Ronnie James Dio's death, the band released the single and video for the song "For The Last In Line".

== Personnel ==
=== Current members ===
- MR.Y - Guitar
- Blade - Vocal
- Alx - Bass guitar
- Philty - Drums

=== Past members ===
- Markus Johansson - Bass guitar
- Rickard Johansson - Drums
- Niclas Lideskär - Vocal
- Tomas Lindgren - Drums
- Stefan Orhamn - Drums
- H.B. Anderson - Vocal

== Discography ==
=== Studio albums ===
- Beyond Reality (2002)
- Neo Natural Freaks (2006)
- World Domination (2008)
- 21st Century Freaks (2012)
- White Trash Heroes (2014)
