= Evertale =

German metal band

Evertale is a German power metal band. They have released two studio albums.

The band originally released Of Dragons and Elves independently in 2013, which was re-released by NoiseArt Records in 2015 after Evertale was signed to that label. 2017's The Great Brotherwar also came out on NoiseArt.

== Discography ==
- The Chronicles Chapter I (EP, 2009)
- Of Dragons and Elves (2013)
- The Great Brotherwar (2017)
