= Beyond Creation =

Canadian technical death metal band

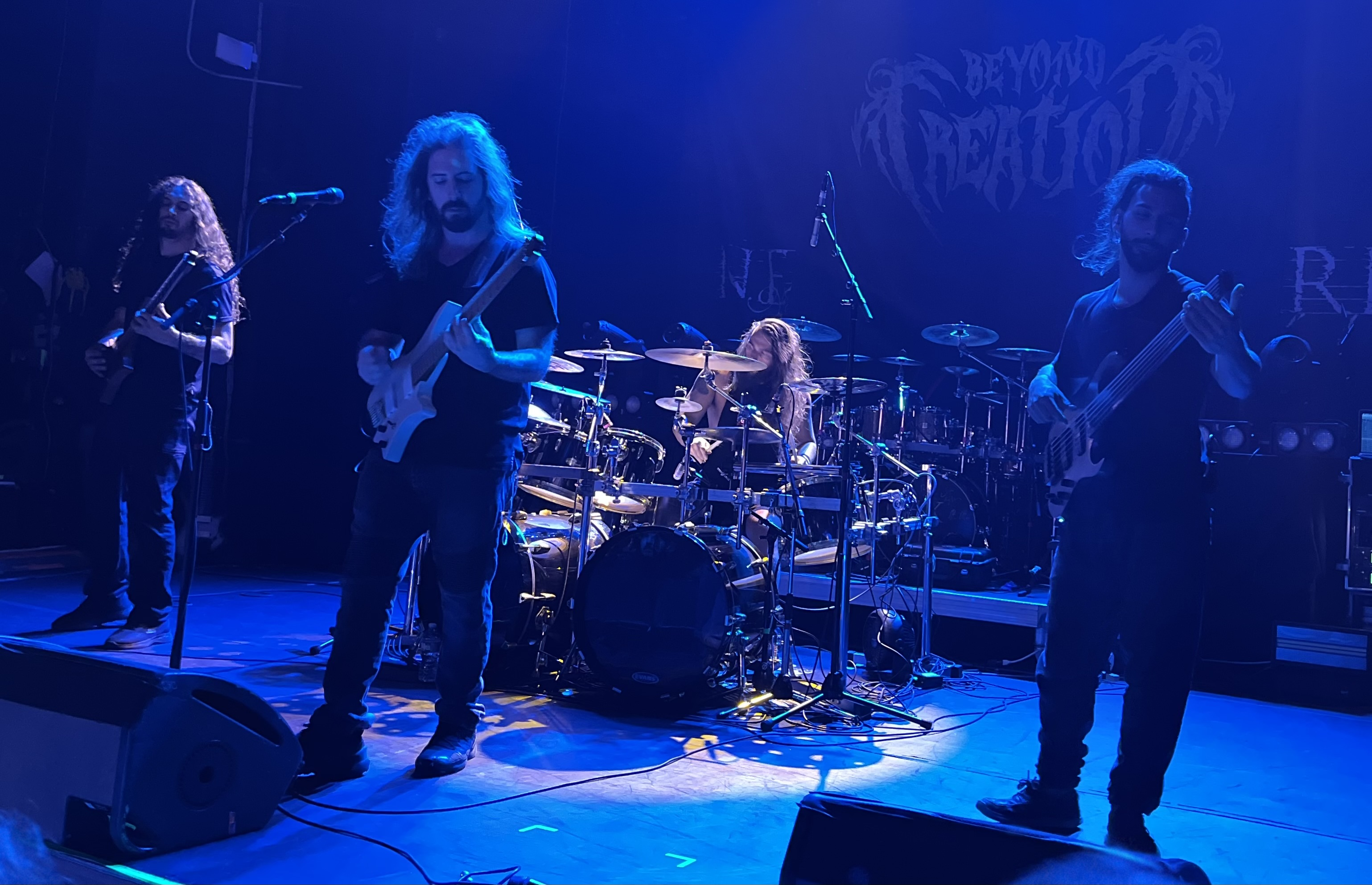
- Beyond Creation performing in 2023

Background information
- Origin: Montreal, Quebec, Canada
- Genres: Technical death metal, progressive metal
- Years active: 2005–present
- Label: Season of Mist
- Members: Simon Girard; Kevin Chartré; Hugo Doyon-Karout; Philippe Boucher
- Past members: Nicolas Domingo Viotto; Guyot Begin-Benoit; Dominic "Forest" Lapointe
- Website: www.beyondcreationofficial.com

Beyond Creation is a Canadian technical death metal band from Montreal, Quebec. They are currently signed to Season of Mist records. The group has released three studio albums to date: The Aura (2011), Earthborn Evolution (2014), and Algorythm (2018). They have toured extensively in Europe, the United States and Japan, supporting bands such as Obscura and Dying Fetus, while headlining tours alongside acts such as Revocation, Psycroptic and Virvum. The band's 2018 release Algorythm received a 2019 Juno Awards nomination for "Metal/Hard Music Album of the Year."

== History ==
Beyond Creation was formed in Montreal, Quebec, Canada by current guitarist and lead vocalist Simon Girard and former guitarist Nicolas Domingo Viotto. The band expanded their lineup over the coming years and self-released their debut full-length The Aura in 2011.

On February 19, 2013, the band signed with Season Of Mist and then re-released The Aura. To support the album's re-release, Beyond Creation toured North America on the Decibel Magazine Tour with Cannibal Corpse, Napalm Death and Immolation.

The band released their second album, Earthborn Evolution, on October 24, 2014.

In 2015, the band toured extensively, embarking on The Summer Slaughter Tour, alongside Arch Enemy, Born of Osiris, Veil of Maya, The Acacia Strain and Cattle Decapitation and also supporting label-mates Hate Eternal on the Infernus World Tour.

In 2016, the band performed their first European tour as part of Obscura's Akróasis European tour.

The band released their third album, Algorythm, on October 12, 2018.

== Band members ==
=== Current ===
- Simon Girard – guitar, vocals (2005–present)
- Kevin Chartré – guitar, backing vocals (2007–present)
- Philippe Boucher – drums (2012–present)
- Hugo Doyon-Karout – bass (2015–present)

=== Former ===
- Nicolas Domingo Viotto – guitar (2005–2007)
- Guyot Begin-Benoit – drums (2005–2012)
- Dominic "Forest" Lapointe – bass (2010–2015)

== Discography ==
=== Studio albums ===
- The Aura (2011)
- Earthborn Evolution (2014)
- Algorythm (2018)

=== Demo ===
- Demos (2010)

=== Music videos ===
- "Omnipresent Perception" (2012)
- "Fundamental Process" (2015)
- "Coexistence" (2017)
- "Earthborn Evolution" (2017)
- "Theatrical Delirium" (2018)
- "The Inversion" (2018)
- "In Adversity" (2019)
- "The Afterlife" (2019)
- "Surface's Echoes" (2020)
- "Reverence" (2026)

== Awards and nominations ==
| Year | Award | Category | Nominee/Work | Result | Ref |
|---|---|---|---|---|---|
| 2019 | Juno Award | Metal/Hard Music Album of the Year | Algorythm | | |
