= Groza (band) =

German black metal band

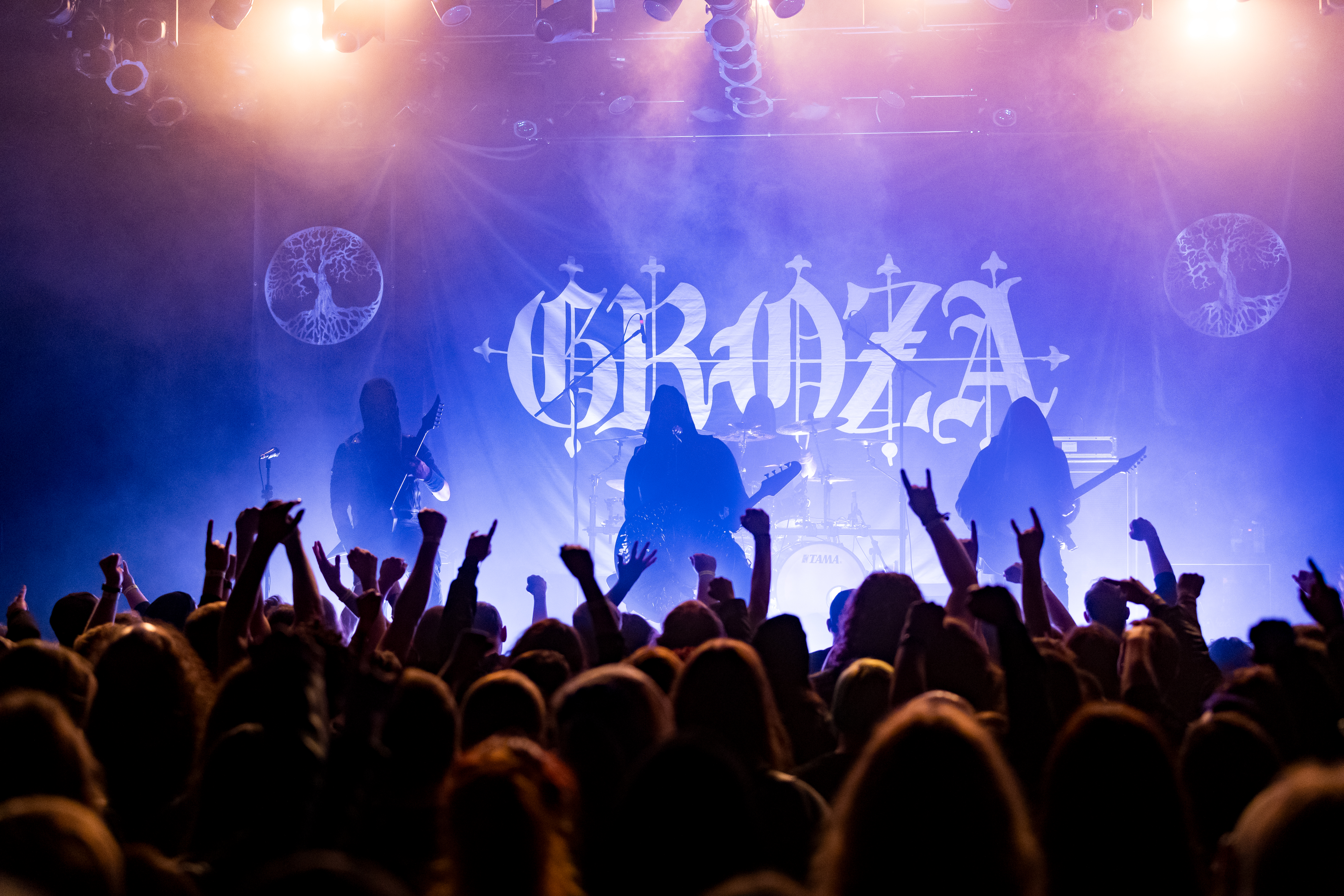
Groza at 20 Years New Evil Festival, 2024

Groza is a German black metal band. The band has released three album on AOP Records.

The band hails from Mühldorf am Inn. Their music has specifically been referred to as atmospheric black metal. Groza's bass player "M.S." died from long-term illness in 2023.

== Discography ==
- Unified in Void (2018)
- The Redemptive End (2021)
- Nadir (2024)
- Live at Ragnarök (live album, 2025)
