= Wilderun =

American progressive metal band

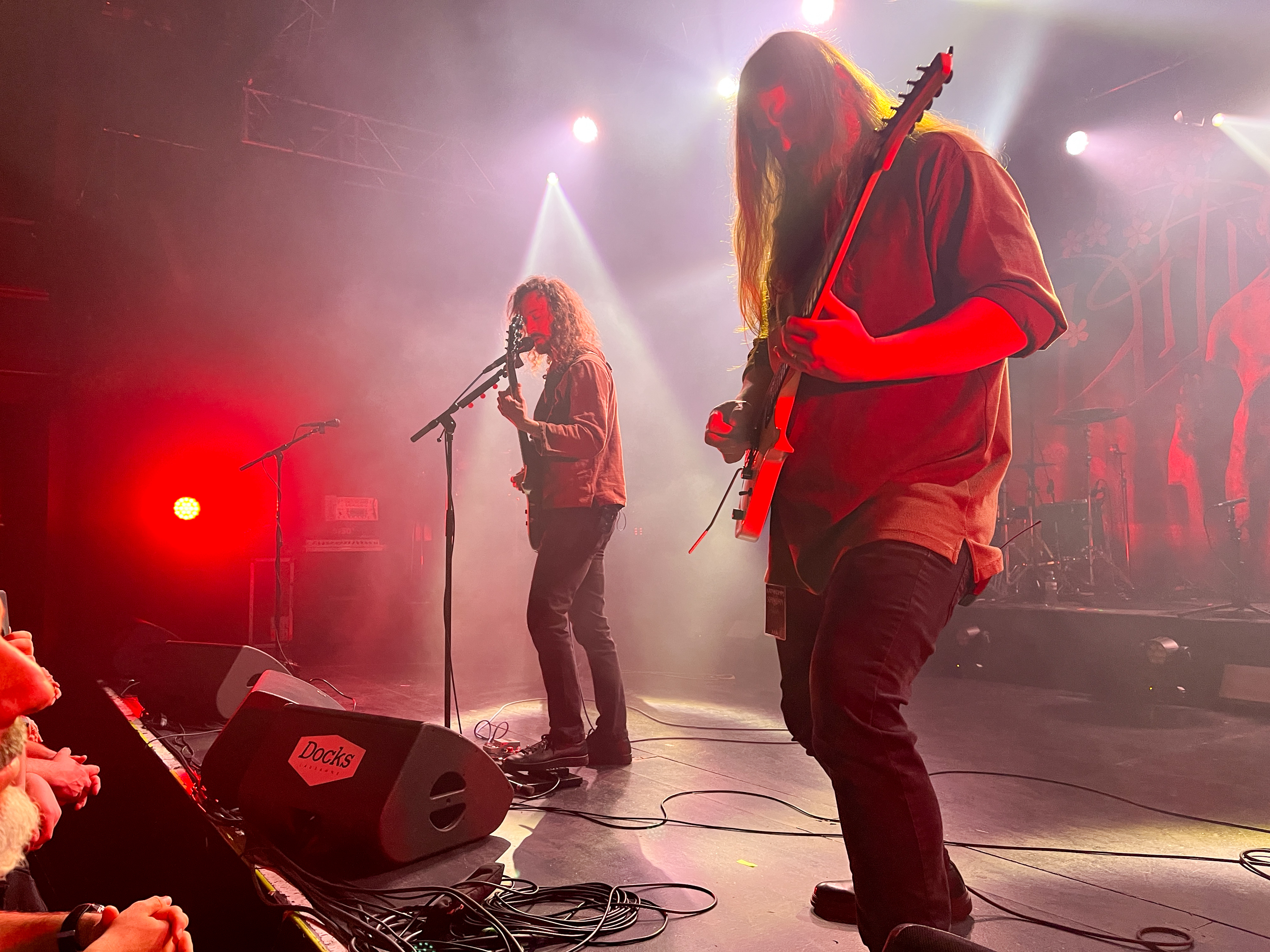
- Wilderun at Les Docks in Lausanne, Switzerland on February 21, 2023.

Background information
- Origin: Boston, Massachusetts, U.S.
- Genres: Folk metal; progressive metal; symphonic metal; melodic death metal; progressive rock
- Years active: 2008–present
- Labels: Century Media Records; Independent (2008–2020)
- Members: Evan Berry; Dan Müller; Wayne Ingram; Joe Gettler; Jon Teachey
- Website: wilderun.com

Wilderun is an American progressive metal band from Boston, Massachusetts. Originally being founded as a solo band from 2008, the band came to fruition in 2012 and currently consists of vocalist, guitarist, and founder Evan Berry, guitarist Joe Gettler, drummer Jon Teachey, and Dan Müller and Wayne Ingram for orchestrations, bass, and synths. They have released four albums and two remixed singles that can only be found on their Bandcamp.

The band name originates from The Sword of Shannara Trilogy, a novel series that founder Evan Berry has read and admires.

== History ==
Back in 2010, Wilderun slowly formed when Wayne Ingram noticed a lone flyer on a bulletin board to which he recalled saying, “Looking for members for [a] symphonic folk metal band" as he was walking through the halls of rehearsal rooms at his music school. Ingram found it suiting to his interests, tore off one of the flyer's strips that had Evan Berry's email and contacted him. At the time, Evan had been experimenting with a live setup on a few prototype tracks for their debut album Olden Tales & Deathly Trails, and decided that he would be the only guitarist.

About a year later, Evan emailed Ingram that his previous live setup failed, and Ingram, being the only person to contact him about his symphonic, folk metal project was told to meet in person. At Ingram's apartment, Evan presented his work-in-progress songs and reached out, wanting to work with someone who could create orchestral compositions. They both agreed to record a small demo, with both being guitarists and Ingram expanding onto his orchestral ideas for a few songs, which would result into their debut album.

In early 2012, the band solidified at the Berklee College of Music in Boston, to which Dan Müller mentions that Evan "reached out to the people he knew in the metal scene", noting that it was an easy process due to the institute's small community.

In 2019, they released their breakout studio album Veil of Imagination, before signing to Century Media Records. In 2022, they released their fourth studio album Epigone.

On August 19, 2026, the band announced on their Instagram page that bassist Dan Müller would be playing his final show with them on the 23rd of that month, following his decision to leave the group as "the rollercoaster of the band life no longer suits" him.

== Style ==
Wilderun is known for combining folk music with symphonic arrangements, featuring extreme melodeath gutturals and distorted guitar riffs, resulting in the band and its material having been described as folk metal, progressive metal, symphonic metal, melodic death metal, and progressive rock.

From an interview with Dan Müller, he explains that the band "wanted to [compose] an Americana folk metal-style of sound and thought [the] name ['Wilderun'] really fits with that goal", aiming to have a "wild-west" sound and avoiding genre stereotypes.

== Band members ==
=== Current ===
- Evan Berry – guitars, lead vocals (2008–present)
- Wayne Ingram – orchestration, guitars (2012–present)
- Jon Teachey - drums (2012–present)

=== Former ===
- Joe Gettler - guitars (2014–2021)
- Dan Müller – orchestration, bass, synths (2012–2026)

== Discography ==
=== Studio albums ===
- Olden Tales & Deathly Trails (2012)
- Sleep at the Edge of the Earth (2015)
- Veil of Imagination (2019)
- Epigone (2022)

=== Singles (remixes) ===
- How Stands the Bossa 'Round? (2022)
- Far From Where Bits Unfurl (2023)
