= Sherdi =

- village
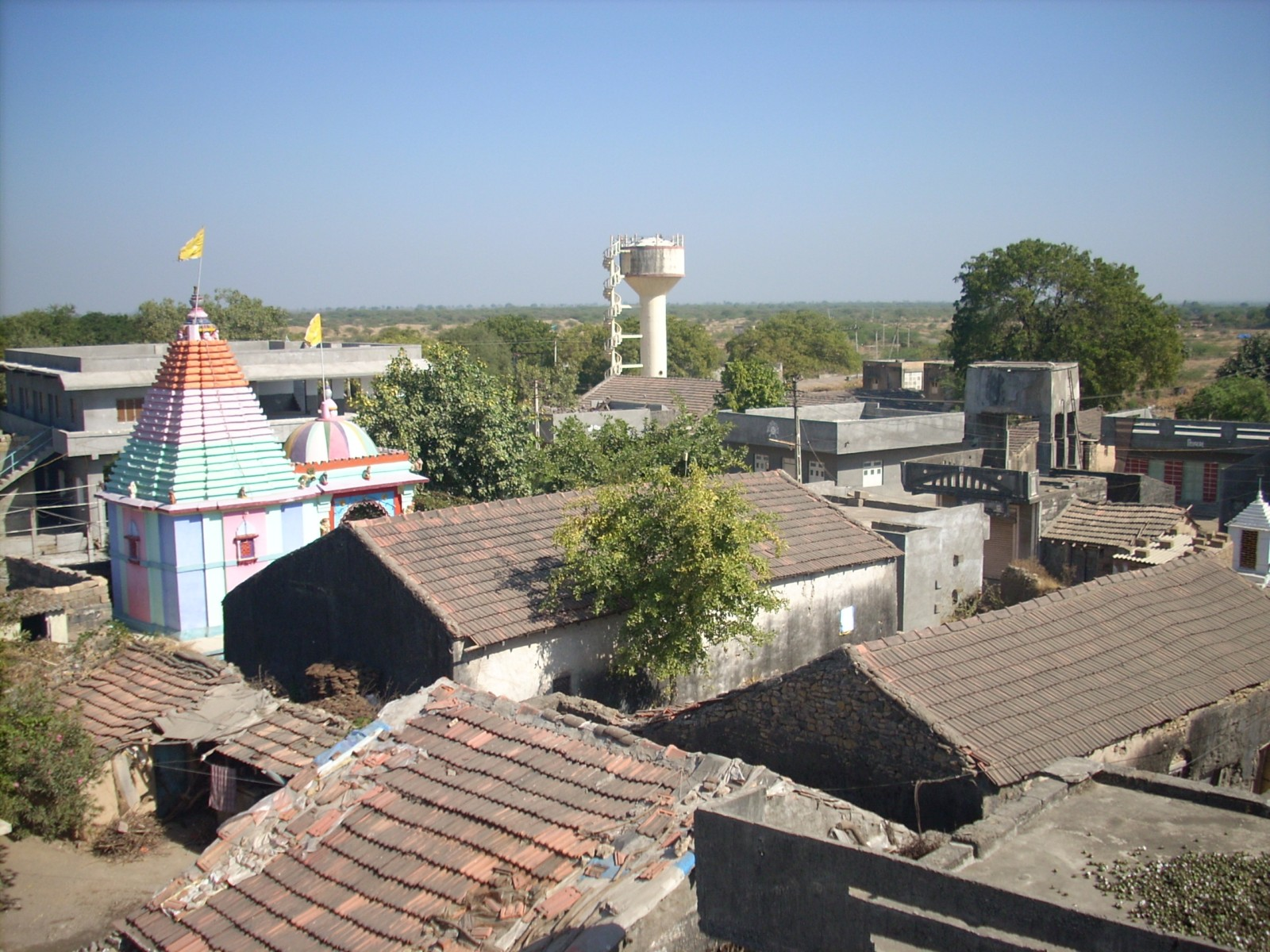
- Sherdi Skyline

- Location in Gujarat, India Sherdi (India)
- Coordinates: 21°35′4.96″N 70°8′24.99″E
- Country: India
- State: Gujarat
- District: Junagadh
- Talukas: Manavadar

Population (2011)
  - Total: 1,250

Languages
  - Official: Gujarati, Hindi
- Time zone: UTC+5:30 (IST)
- PIN: 362640
- Telephone code: 02874
- Vehicle registration: GJ-11
- Nearest city: Junagadh
- Literacy: 74%
- Lok Sabha constituency: Porbandar
- Vidhan Sabha constituency: Manavadar
- Website: gujaratindia.com

Sherdi (/ˈʃɛərdi/ SHAIR-dee) is a village in Saurashtra region of Gujarat state in India. It is located in Manavadar Taluka of Junagadh district.

== Local Governance ==
Sherdi Gram Panchayat is the local village council and a sarpanch serves as the head of the council, each council serves for five years. Although the village is very politically active on state and national elections, the panchayat is selected with mutual discussions and local elections are very rare.

== Economy and Employment ==
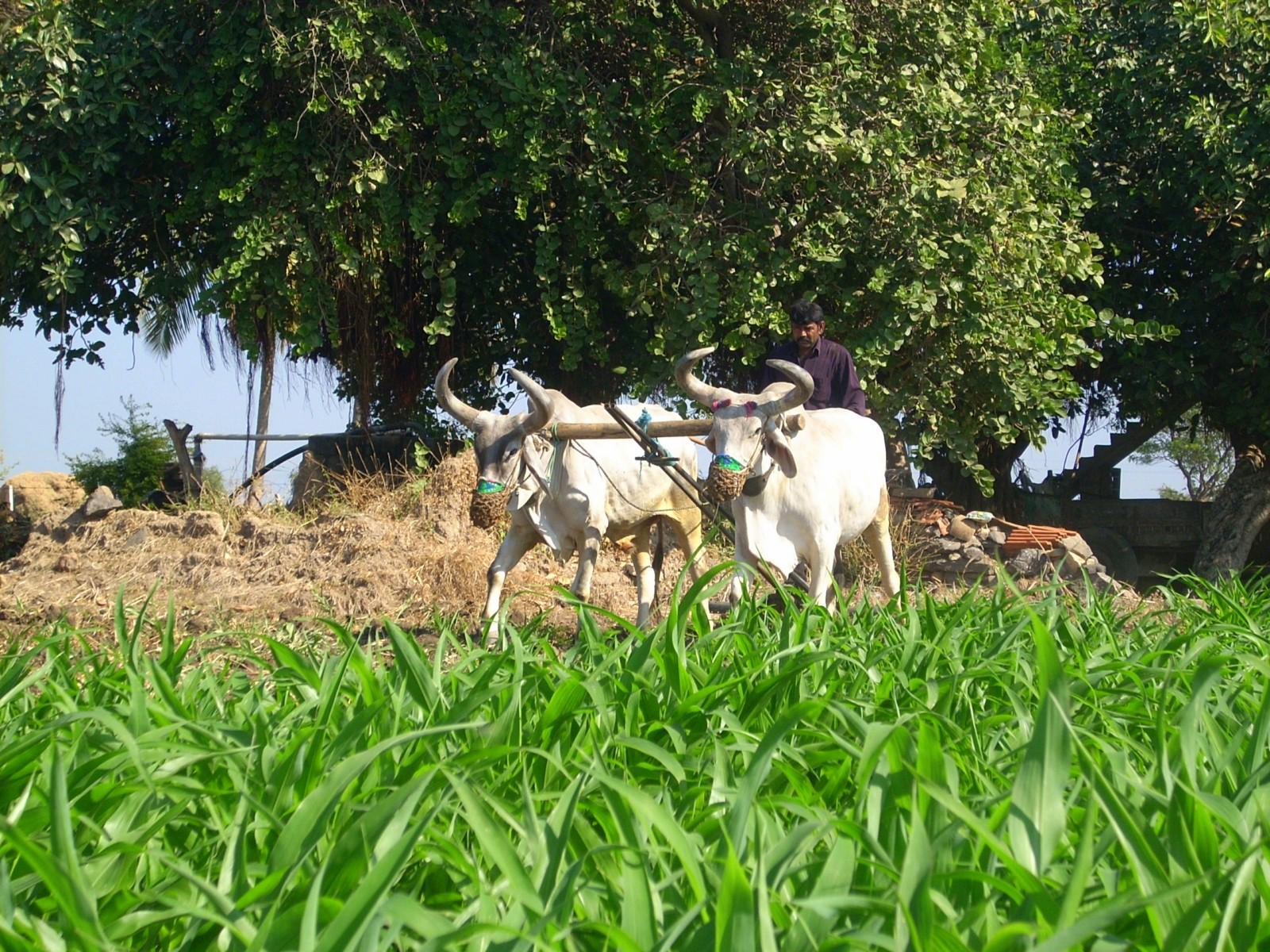
a farmer in Sherdi

Sherdi was entirely dependent on subsistence farming before independence of India and on commercial farming until late 60s. Agriculture is still a major employer and a major source of household income as the village greatly benefited from India's green revolution and white revolution. India's education reforms also played a vital part in the last thirty years and now many people from Sherdi are employed in services and industries all over the world. Sherdi Seva Sahkari Mandli is the village cooperative society and also operates as rations distribution centre for subsidised foods and kerosene. The society also supplies fertilizers and lends agricultural loans to its members. There are several vendors and local shops in the village selling vegetables, groceries and refreshments.

== Education ==
Sherdi has a kindergarten and a primary school teaching grade 1 to 8. Grade 8 was granted to the primary school in 2010 with additional staff and two new classrooms.

== Transportation ==
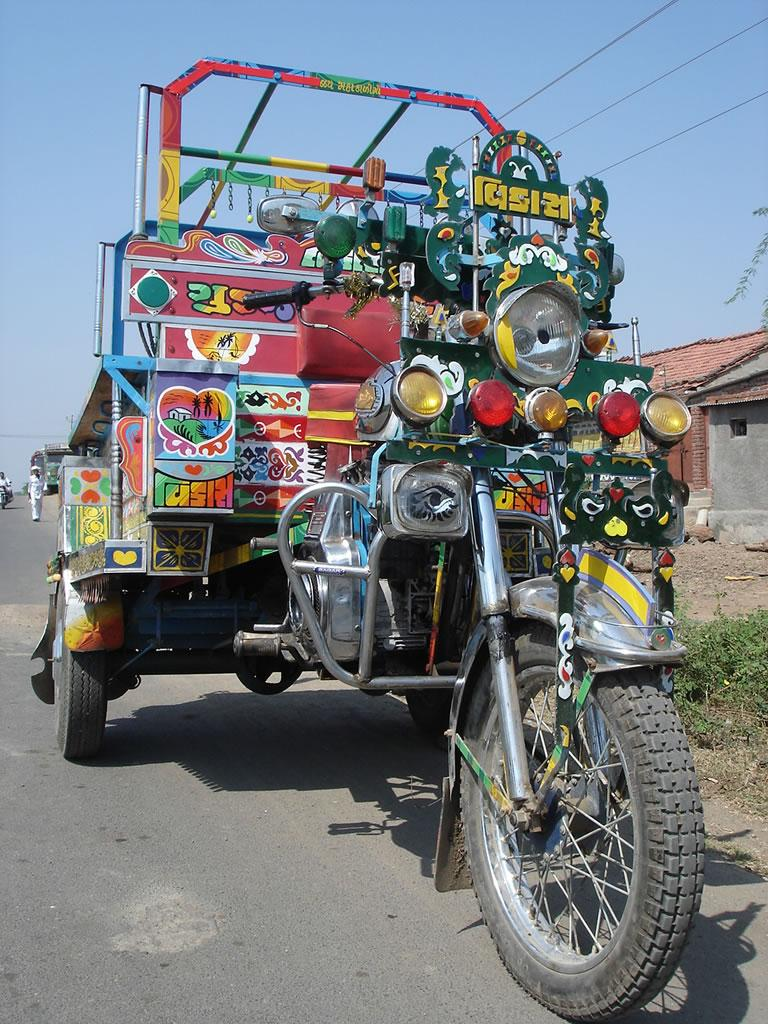
a Chhakdo

Sherdi is connected by asphalt road to Manavadar, Bantwa and Sardargadh and by gravel road to nearby villages of Indra and Limbuda. Sherdi is also connected by dirt roads to Jilana and Zinzri, these routes are not accessible by motorised vehicles when flooded during monsoon. Public transport network serving the village is non-existent apart from seasonal bus routes connecting to nearby cities of Manavadar, Bantwa and Dhoraji. Motorcycles are used for private transportation with the majority of households owning motorcycles. Three-wheeled Chhakdo rickshaws are also widely used to transport people and goods.

== Gallery ==
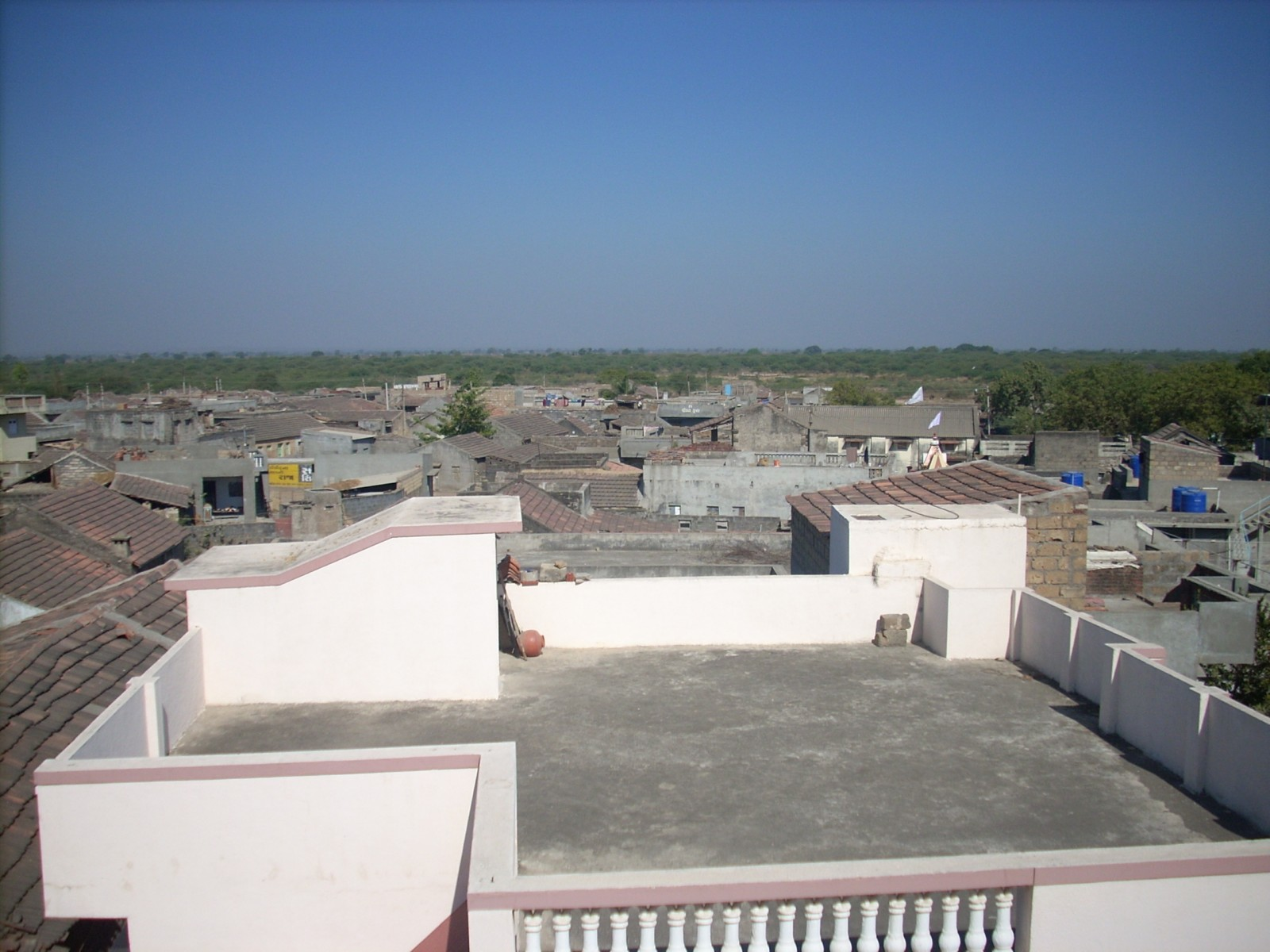

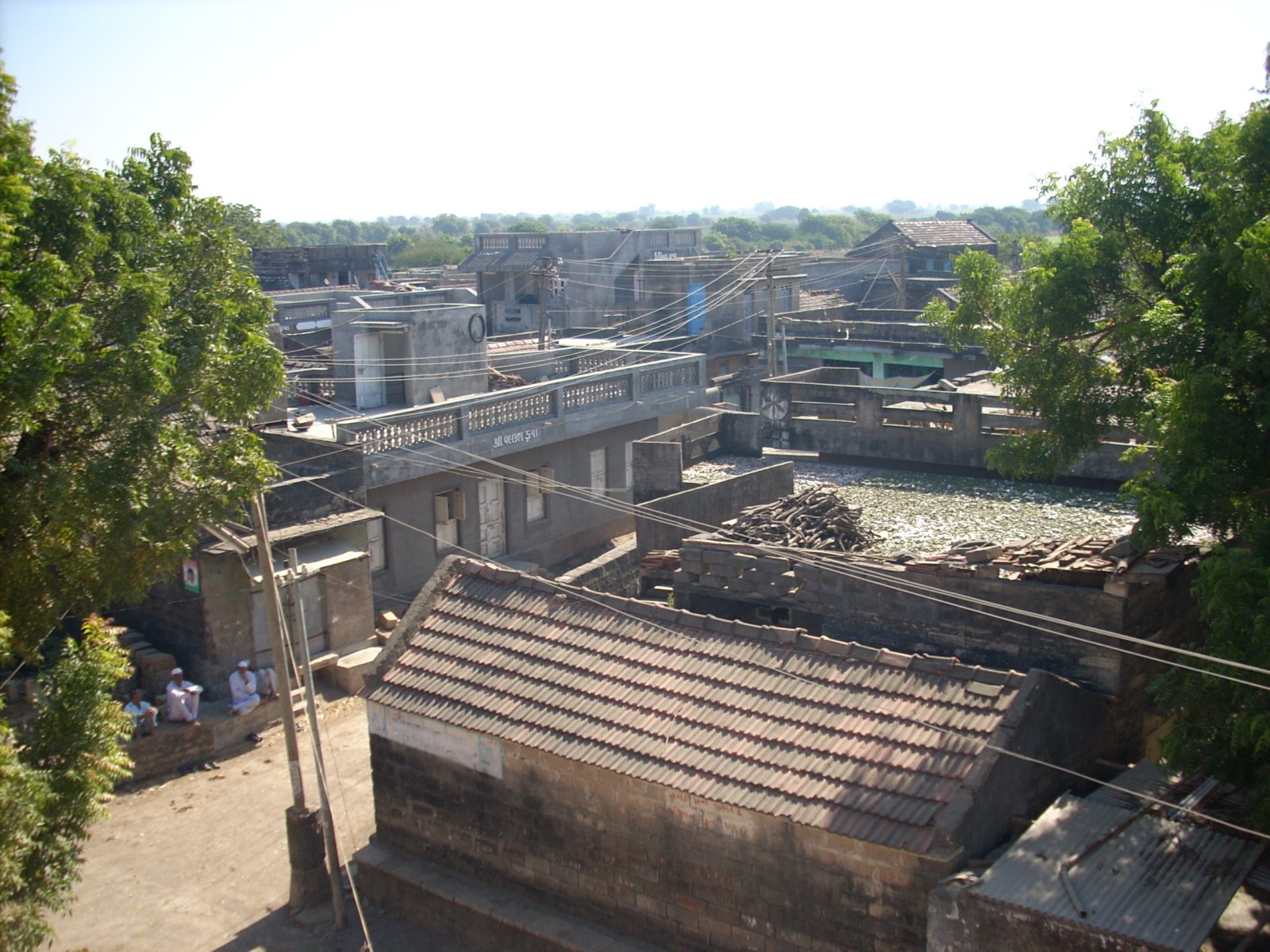

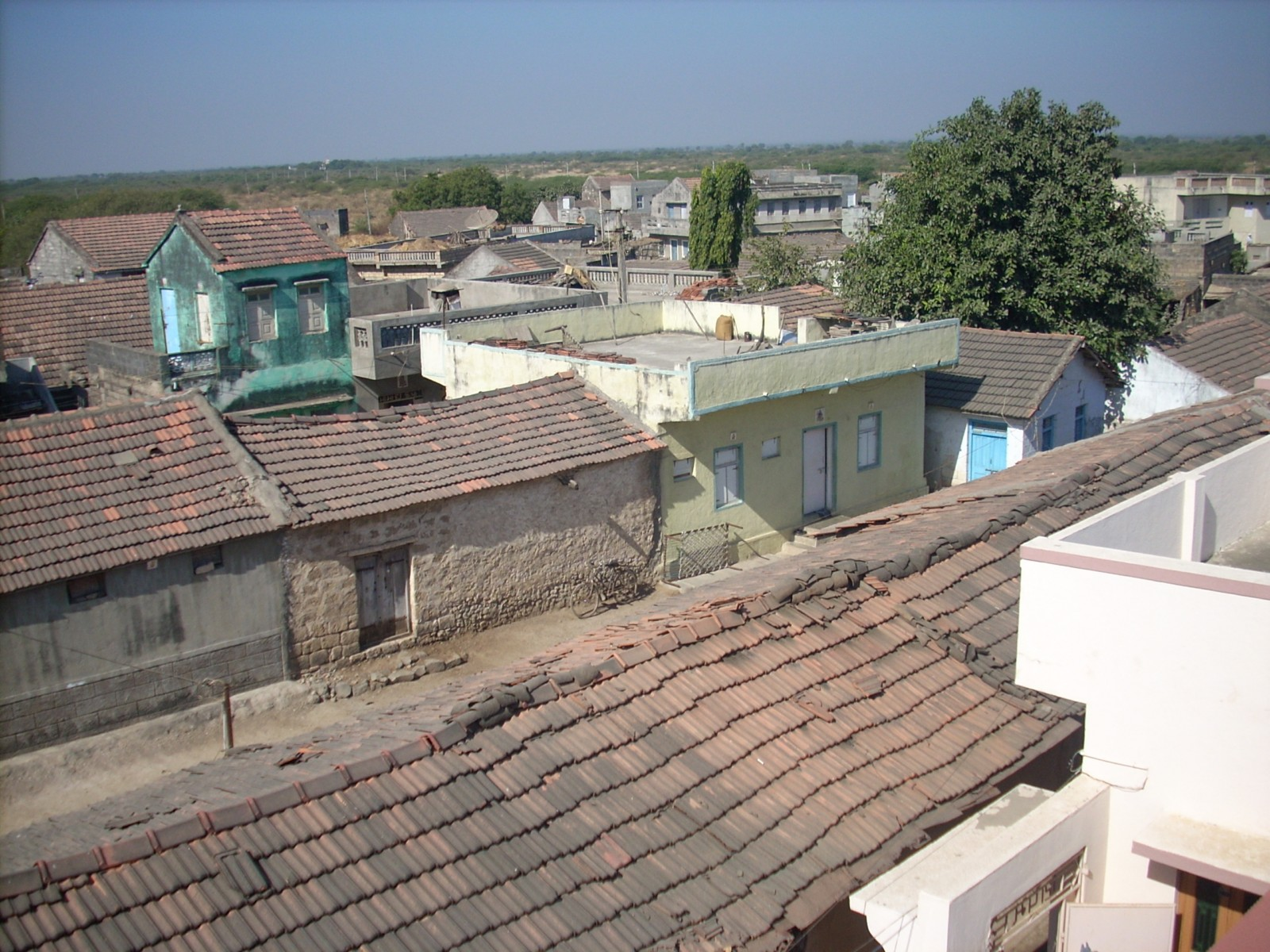

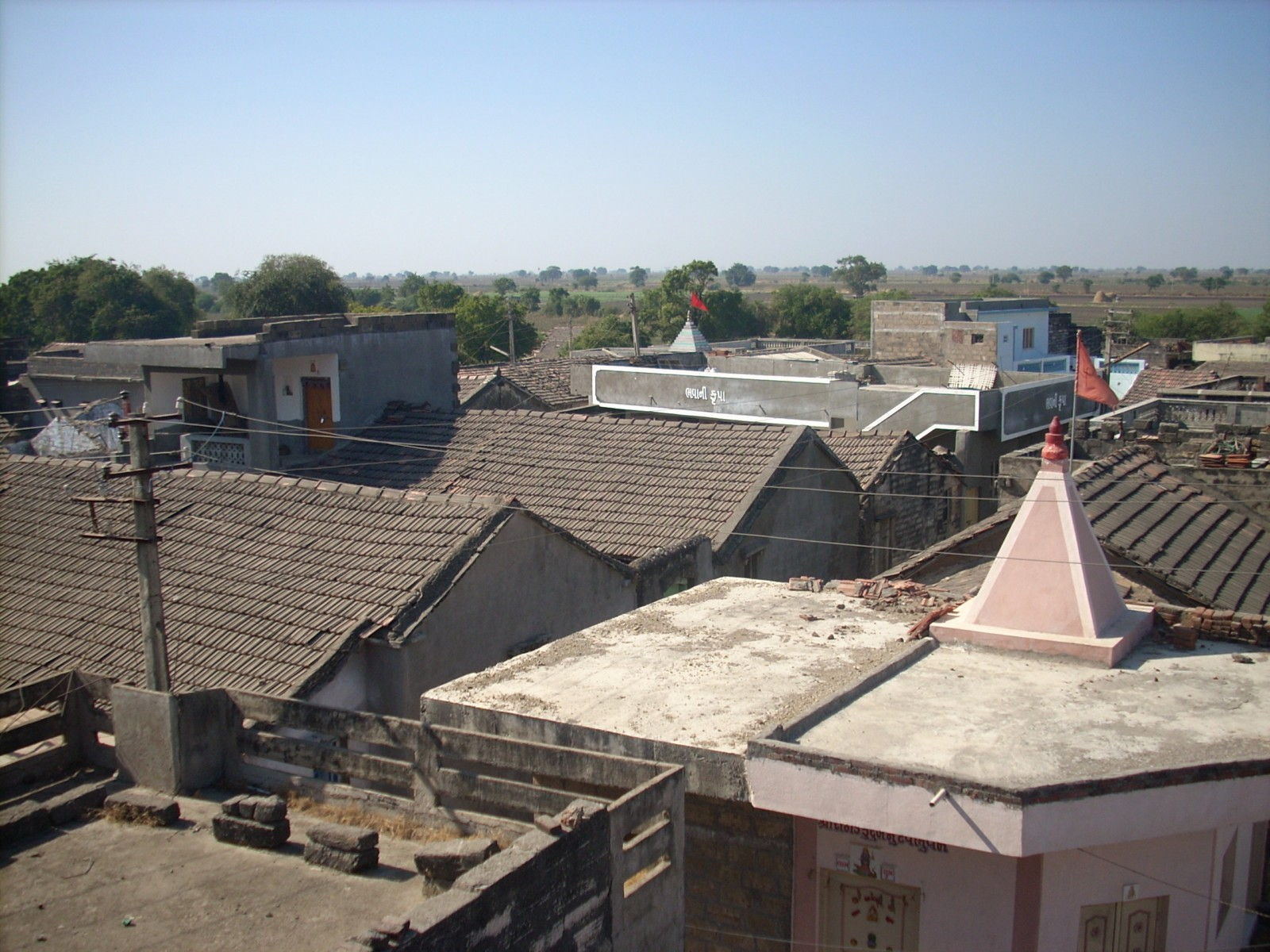
