= Manavadar =

- Town
- Location in Gujarat, India
- Coordinates: 21.5°N 70.13°E
- Country: India
- State: Gujarat
- District: Junagadh
- Elevation: 24 m (79 ft)

Population (2001)
  - Total: 30,850
  - Rank: 1

Languages
  - Official: Gujarati
- Time zone: UTC+5:30 (IST)
- PIN: 362630
- Vehicle registration: GJ 11
- Website: http://manavadar.com/

Manavadar is a city and a municipality in Junagadh district of India.

== History ==
Bantva Manavadar was a princely state of British India. Founded in 1733, it became a British protectorate in 1818. On 25 September 1947, it acceded to the newly formed Pakistan. However, Indian forces entered the area on the grounds that the state was a vassal of the Junagadh state, which was itself a vassal of the Baroda state that had acceded to India. This land is still considered a disputed area between India and Pakistan.

It was also known as the Asia's third center for cotton ginning. It contained almost around more than 75 ginning factories of cotton.

Pakistan's government has maintained its territorial claim on Manavadar, along with Junagadh State and Sir Creek in Gujarat, on its official political map.

== Geography ==
Manavadar is located at 21.5°N 70.13°E. It has an average elevation of 24 metres (78 feet).

== Demographics ==
As of 2001 India census, Manavadar had a population of 27,559. Males constitute 52% of the population and females 48%. Manavadar has an average literacy rate of 82%, higher than the national average of 59.5%: male literacy is 76%, and female literacy is 63%. In Manavadar, 12% of the population is under 6 years of age.

It has developed cotton industry and cotton and groundnut are the most cash crops of the area. The town was famous once upon a time due to its vegetable ghee industries, but in winds and sweeps of economic reform in India, all three units has been closed. Manavadar taluk have big towns or villages like Bantwa, Nanadiya, Khambhla, Nakara, Pajod, Jilana, Sardargadh, Velva, Kodvav (List of Indian Princely States), Mitdi, Limbuda, Indra, Sherdi, Bhimora, Bodka (Swamina), Galvav, Sanosara, Koyalana (Ghed), Zinzari, Chudva, Khadiya, Vadala, Sitana, Bhitana, and Padaradi (Ghed) (પાદરડી-ઘેડ).
