= Patty Gurdy =

German hurdy-gurdy musician and singer

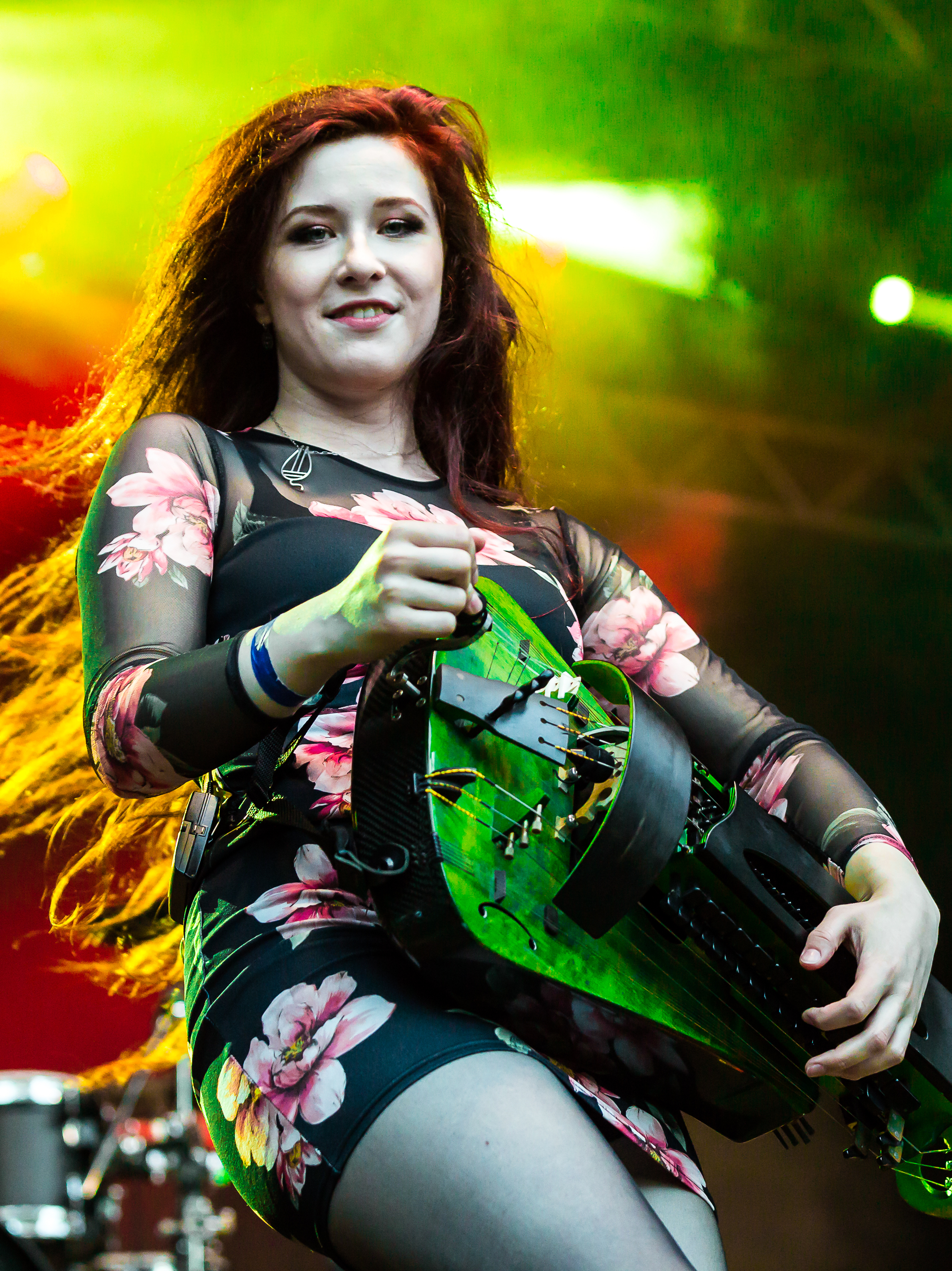
- Büchler performing at Wave-Gotik-Treffen in 2022

Background information
- Born: Patricia Büchler; 9 March 1997 (age 29); Ratingen, Germany
- Genres: Folk rock; pop rock; pirate metal; folk metal
- Instruments: Hurdy-gurdy
- Website: pattygurdy.com

Patricia Büchler (born 9 March 1997), known professionally as Patty Gurdy, is a German hurdy-gurdy musician, singer, songwriter and YouTuber.

== Early life and career ==
Büchler was born on 9 March 1997. She lived in Düsseldorf while she studied there and graduated in 2019. She has two sisters and some Irish ancestry. She earned a bachelor's degree in communication design. After playing the piano and other instruments for many years, she took up the hurdy-gurdy in 2014 and describes her genre as "dark folk-pop". She was a member of German bands Harpyie, under the stage name Io, in 2016 and Storm Seeker during 2016–2018. Her 2019 festival performances included Smaabyfestivalen in Flekkefjord, Norway and Tredegar House folk festival in Newport, Wales.

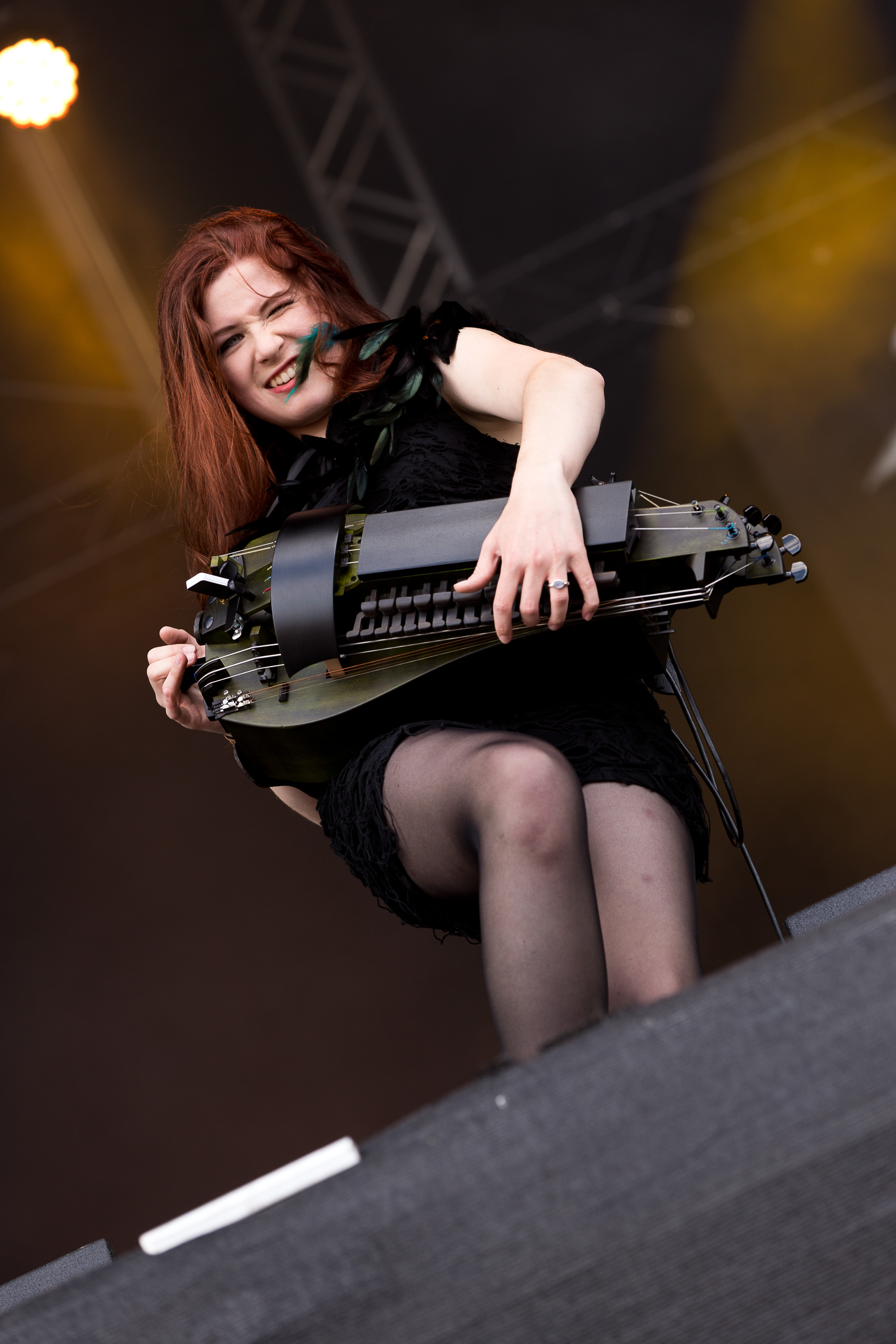
Patty Gurdy during a performance with the band Harpyie in 2016

Patty released her first EP, Shapes & Patterns, on 2 March 2018. This included 3 original tracks and 3 cover songs. She released a single entitled Run on 30 August 2019. A second single, Oil, premiered on 13 September 2019. On 27 September 2019 she released her first full-length album, Pest & Power, which was composed mostly of original work. This album featured many guest appearances from well-known names, including Faun. During this time, she also wrote music for the Amazon Prime Video series Carnival Row.

On 22 November 2019 Patty released the single Grieve No More (Extended Version), a song written for that series. Another EP was released on 20 November 2020, entitled Frost & Faeries and including a Christmas-themed collaboration between Patty Gurdy and Fiddler's Green, The Yule Fiddler (Christmas Time is Coming 'Round Today). Her cover of Bad Habits (originally by Ed Sheeran) was released on 30 October 2021. In addition to playing the hurdy-gurdy, she also recorded the nyckelharpa for this single. Another single, Universe Night & Day, premiered on 24 May 2022. This song was released alongside the instrumental version, Universe Night & Day (Instrumental).

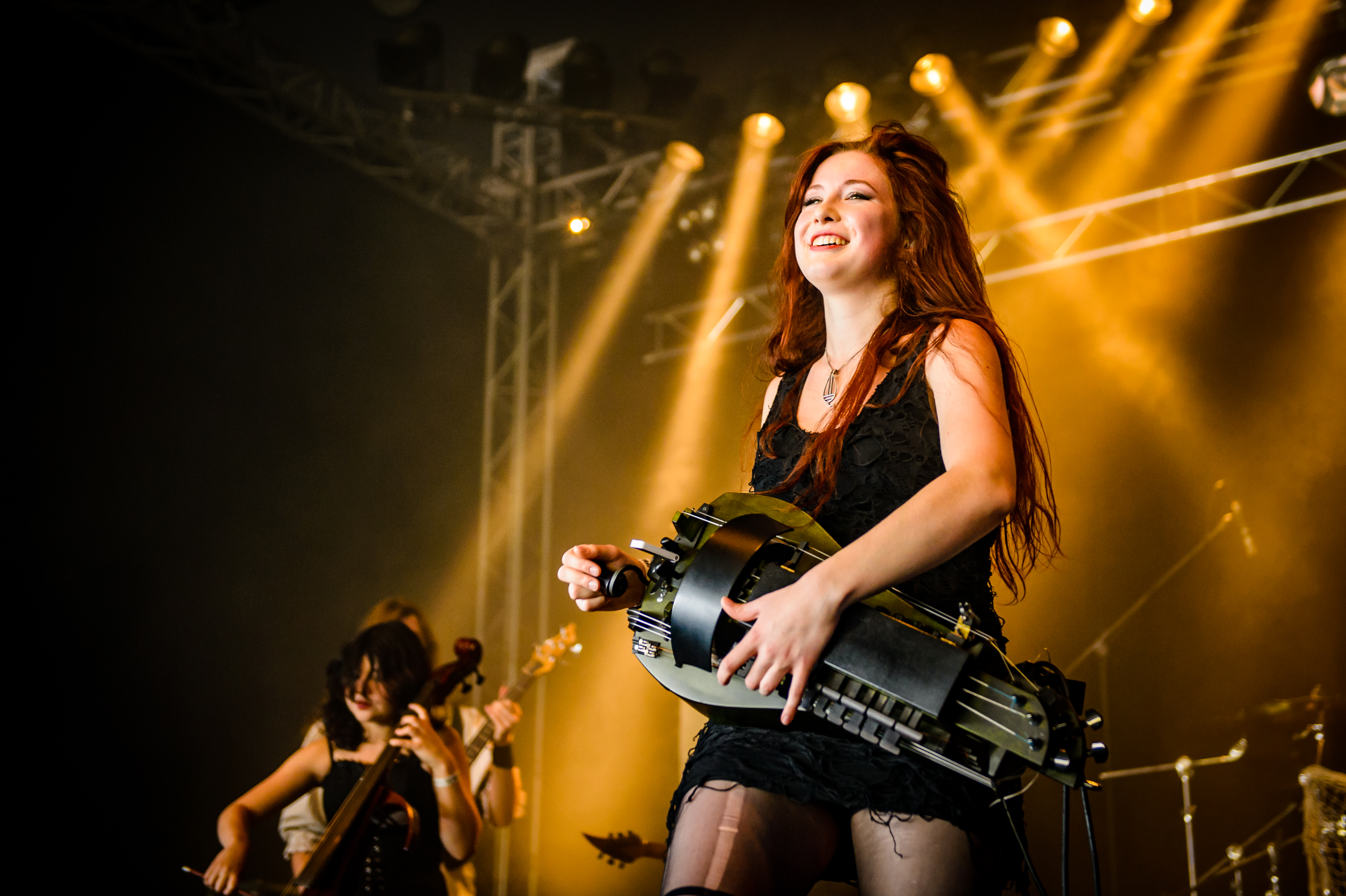
Patty Gurdy with the band Storm Seeker at the 2017 Dong Open Air music festival in Germany

She formed her live band Patty Gurdy's Circle with members of Subway to Sally. The band's musicians were Bodenski, Simon Michael, and Ingo Hampf, along with Patty, who added vocals and the hurdy-gurdy. Together they released one single, entitled Kalte Winde, on 23 April 2020, which was a cover of a song by the German band Bannkreis. Due to the COVID-19 pandemic, Patty Gurdy's Circle was forced to disband.

Her collaborations include ASP, Alestorm, Faun, and Ayreon. She has also worked with the metal band Scardust. In July 2019, she went on tour with Scardust in the United Kingdom. On 22 March 2022, she played her first concert outside of Europe with Scardust in Israel, which was livestreamed on Play2Fund. Patty was originally supposed to play this concert in March 2020, but due to the COVID-19 pandemic, she was not allowed to travel into Israel. Instead, she sent videos of herself to be shown at the Scardust concert without her. She guests in Scardust's music video for their song Concrete Cages, on which she played the hurdy-gurdy and sang. Patty also appears in dArtagnan's single Farewell (released in 2021), in addition to performing live with the band. In 2022, she collaborated with metal band Silverlane on their song Für Immer und Ewig. On 17 June 2022 Patty announced that she arranged part of the soundtrack for the video game Ikonei Island: An Earthlock Adventure (part of the Earthlock series of video games). On 8 July 2022 she released her part of the soundtrack as the single Piratehog Chant. On 23 November 2022, Patty posted a new song called Melodies of Hope, which she also submitted as an application for the Eurovision Song Contest 2023. She was ranked at the last place during the votings (8 out of 8) and Germany that year was represented at Eurovision by Lord of the Lost.

On 24 November 2024, Patty released her "Tavern Album" which features songs sung in English, German and Icelandic and features many other artists including Pernilla Kannapinn, Adaya from Faun and Marko Hietala among others. "Tavern" is her second full album after "Pest & Power". The album was released as a LP vinyl and on CD, the CD format came with a bonus DVD which contains the Tavern movie and behind the scenes content

In November 2025, Patty went on tour with Sabaton as part of the Legendary Orchestra, which played the band's music in an orchestral setting. Electric violinist Mia Asano was a part of the orchestra, with Scardust founder Noa Gruman conducting.

== Reception ==
- Pirate Scum (Storm Seeker, 2016), Metal.de said "Patty ... does a fantastic job in songs like "The Longing". Timo's and Patty's vocals complement each other in this way. The successful folk melodies, which then pound the listener and are then contrasted again by Patty's expressive voice, provide the necessary portion of goosebumps." (Google translation from German)
- Shapes & Patterns EP (2018) included a cover of Over the Hills and Far Away. The Rockoutstandout reviewer wrote "Patty Gurdy's cover with a hurdy-gurdy and vocals gives us a completely different take on the song altogether and it works very well. The echo effect on the vocals give this track that well known powerful atmosphere that the original song is able to do. I love this quirky cover and I always feel a sense of warmth when hearing the song."
- Review of Pest & Power album (2019) by Permafrost.today. "The Hurdy Gurdy is not only embedded in her name, but her music is directly translated from her mind into the green wooden body. Patty Gurdy has established not only the instrument, but herself as a versatile artist, singer and songwriter."
- Guest appearance on Alestorm's album Curse of the Crystal Coconut (2020). The Moshville Times reviewer said "More guest vocals feature on the epic "Zombies Ate My Pirate Ship" courtesy of Patty Gurdy (Patty Gurdy's Circle) who also plays hurdy-gurdy throughout the album. I'll tell you this, she's got an amazing voice! This is a song that you'd expect to sound sillier than it does, but in this case it's the vocals that are a bit daft while the music itself is as straight-laced as could be."

== Discography ==
=== As Patty Gurdy ===
==== Albums and EPs ====
Year	Title	Type
2018	Shapes & Patterns	EP
2019	Pest & Power	Album
2020	Frost & Faeries	EP
2023	Folk & Pop	EP
2024	Tavern	Album

==== Singles ====
Year	Title	Notes
2019	Run	
2019	Oil	
2019	Grieve No More (Extended Version)	Carnival Row soundtrack
2021	Bad Habits	Ed Sheeran cover
2022	Universe Night & Day	

==== Music videos ====
Year	Title	Album/EP	Notes
2016	Gurdy's Green	Shapes & Patterns	
2017	The Longing	Shapes & Patterns	Storm Seeker cover
2017	Sweet Dreams (Are Made of This)	Shapes & Patterns	Eurythmics cover
2017	Game of Thrones	Shapes & Patterns	title song of the Game of Thrones series
2017	The Longing (Karaoke/Instrumental)	Shapes & Patterns	lyric video for instrumental version of Storm Seeker cover
2018	Over the Hills and Far Away	Shapes & Patterns	Gary Moore cover
2019	Run	Pest & Power	
2019	Oil	Pest & Power	
2019	Luring	Pest & Power	with Faun
2019	Grieve No More	Frost & Faeries	Carnival Row soundtrack
2020	One by One	Pest & Power	with Hellscore
2020	Leaves and Lemons	Pest & Power	
2020	The Yule Fiddler (Christmas Time Is Coming 'Round Today)	Frost & Faeries	with Fiddler's Green
2020	Molly Malone	Frost & Faeries	Irish traditional
2021	Horizon Turns Red	Frost & Faeries	
2021	Flower Duet Theme	Frost & Faeries	Lakmé opera cover
2021	Bad Habits	Folk & Pop	Ed Sheeran cover
2021	The Parting Glass	TBA	Scottish traditional
2021	Lora Lie Lo	Frost & Faeries	Carnival Row soundtrack
2022	The Night Our Ship Will Drown	Pest & Power	partial music video
2022	No One Knows Who I Am	TBA	Jekyll & Hyde musical cover
2022	Universe Night & Day	Folk & Pop	
2022	Piratehog Chant	TBA	Earthlock soundtrack
2022	Running Up That Hill	Folk & Pop	Kate Bush cover
2022	Melodies of Hope	Folk & Pop	
2024	Brighter Days Come	Tavern Album	
2024	Find me some pretty girls	Tavern Album	Featuring Adaya & Pernilla Kannapinn
2024	I Am With You	Tavern Album	Featuring Marko Hietala
2024	Peg Leg Silly-Billy	Tavern Album	Featuring Christopher Bowes
2025	Álfarann	Tavern Album	Featuring Magga Einarsdóttir
2025	Rise Up	Tavern Album	
2025	I Am Free	Tavern Album	Featuring Pernilla Kannapinn
2025	The Dragon From Lowerhill	Tavern Album	Featuring Teufel von Tanzwut
2025	Ein Stücklein Erd	Tavern Album	

==== Guest appearances ====
Year	Title	Album/EP	Notes
2019		ASP's album Zaubererbruder Live & Extended (2019)	There is a limited DVD edition as a crowdfunding benefit
2019	Grieve No More and Lora Lie Lo	Carnival Row soundtrack	Two songs written for the character Aisling Querelle
2020	Concrete Cages	Scardust's album Strangers	Also with Hellscore
2020	Zombies Ate My Pirate Ship (vocals and hurdy-gurdy) and Big Ship Little Ship (hurdy-gurdy)	Alestorm's album Curse of the Crystal Coconut (2020)	
2020		Ayreon album Transitus	
2020	Kaufmann und Maid	Saltatio Mortis album Kaufmann und Maid	German for: "Merchant and Damsel", with Sasha, Saltatio Mortis, Feuerschwanz, Subway to Sally, Tanzwut, Schandmaul and dArtagnan. This song is a parody related to the German TV show Late Night Berlin
2020	One of a large group performing Drunken Sailor	Fiddler's Green 2020 album 3 Cheers For 30 Years	
2021	Farewell	dArtagnan album Feuer & Flamme	
2022	Wooden Leg (Part III) (hurdy-gurdy)	Alestorm's album Seventh Rum of a Seventh Rum	
2022	Für Immer und Ewig	Silverlane album Inside Internal Infinity	
2024	Voyage of the Dead Marauder (vocals and hurdy-gurdy)	Alestorm's 2024 EP Voyage of the Dead Marauder	
2025	Mega-Supreme Treasure of the Eternal Thunderfist	Alestorm's 2025 album The Thunderfist Chronicles	

=== As Patty Gurdy's Circle ===
==== Single ====
Year	Title
2020	Kalte Winde

==== Music video ====
Year	Title	Album/EP
2020	Kalte Winde	non-album single
