= Faiz Bhora =

American thoracic surgeon

Faiz Y. Bhora
- Education: Aga Khan University
- Medical career
- Profession: Thoracic Surgeon
- Institutions: Health Quest Systems, Inc. Mount Sinai Roosevelt; Mount Sinai St. Luke's
- Research: Cancer Research

Faiz Y. Bhora is an American thoracic surgeon. In 2022 he was appointed as the inaugural Regional Chair of Surgery for the central region for Hackensack Meridian Health.

Bhora specializes in minimally invasive approaches to thoracic diseases, including the use of video-assisted thoracoscopic surgery (VATS). This procedure is performed using a small video camera that is inserted into the patient's chest with robotic techniques. This includes the use of the da Vinci Surgical System to perform minimally invasive thoracic surgery.

Prior to his current position, he was the Chief of Thoracic Surgery, Associate Program Director of General Surgery Residency, Director of Robotic Thoracic Surgery and Research and Co-Director of the Airway Center at Mount Sinai West and Mount Sinai Morningside in New York City. He held an academic appointment as Associate Professor of Thoracic Surgery at The Icahn School of Medicine at Mount Sinai, he served as System Chief of Thoracic Surgery and Thoracic Oncology Program at Nuvance Health, a group of seven hospitals in the Mid Hudson Valley area of New York and Western Connecticut, serving 1.5 million individuals, and having over 2,600 healthcare providers and physicians and was previously Associate Professor of Surgery at Columbia University College of Physicians and Surgeons. Bhora has also served as a Board Member of Mount Sinai Health Partners.

== Biography ==
Bhora received his MD from the Aga Khan University. He completed a residency in General Surgery at the George Washington University Medical Center, followed by Cardiothoracic Surgery training at UCLA Medical Center. He completed his MBBS in 1992. In addition, he completed a fellowship in Thoracic Oncology Surgery at University of Pennsylvania.

Bhora specializes in minimally invasive approaches to thoracic diseases, using Video-assisted thoracoscopic surgery, and robot-assisted surgery techniques to perform minimally invasive operations. He is nationally and internationally known for his expertise in robotic and advanced airway surgery. In addition, he has started airway and robotic thoracic surgery programs in Dubai, UAE and Doha, Qatar, and is actively involved in Graduate Medical Education in Pakistan at his alma mater, the Aga Khan University.

Bhora is the inventor of TIO, an airway device that serves as a bit block, oral airway, and oxygen delivery system. He is also Co-Founder of NuHeal Partners, a software startup focusing on Patient Experience and Transparency in Healthcare delivery.

Bhora has been President of the New York General Thoracic Surgical Club (NYGTSC), the premier general thoracic surgical society in the tristate area for the last decade. He is also the President of the Eastern Cardiothoracic Surgical Society (ECTSS), the largest society of thoracic surgeons on the east coast.

== Research ==
Bhora is directing advanced translational research into developing a bioengineered trachea using a novel collagen scaffold and 3D printing technology at the Rudy L. Ruggles Biomedical Research Institute. He is also conducting outcomes research in thoracic oncology and minimally invasive robotic surgery. He has previously been the Director of Thoracic Surgery Research at Mount Sinai Morningside and Mount Sinai West.

Bhora has also directed the Ahmad Adaya Cardiothoracic Research Fellowship that has been responsible for the training and mentoring of several young physicians.

== Awards ==
- Patient’s Choice Award 2009-2019
- America’s Top Surgeons 2011-2019
- Castle Connolly New York Metro Top Docs 2019
- New York Magazine Top Doctors 2019
- New York Super Doctors 2019
