= Denver School of the Arts =

Public school in Colorado, US

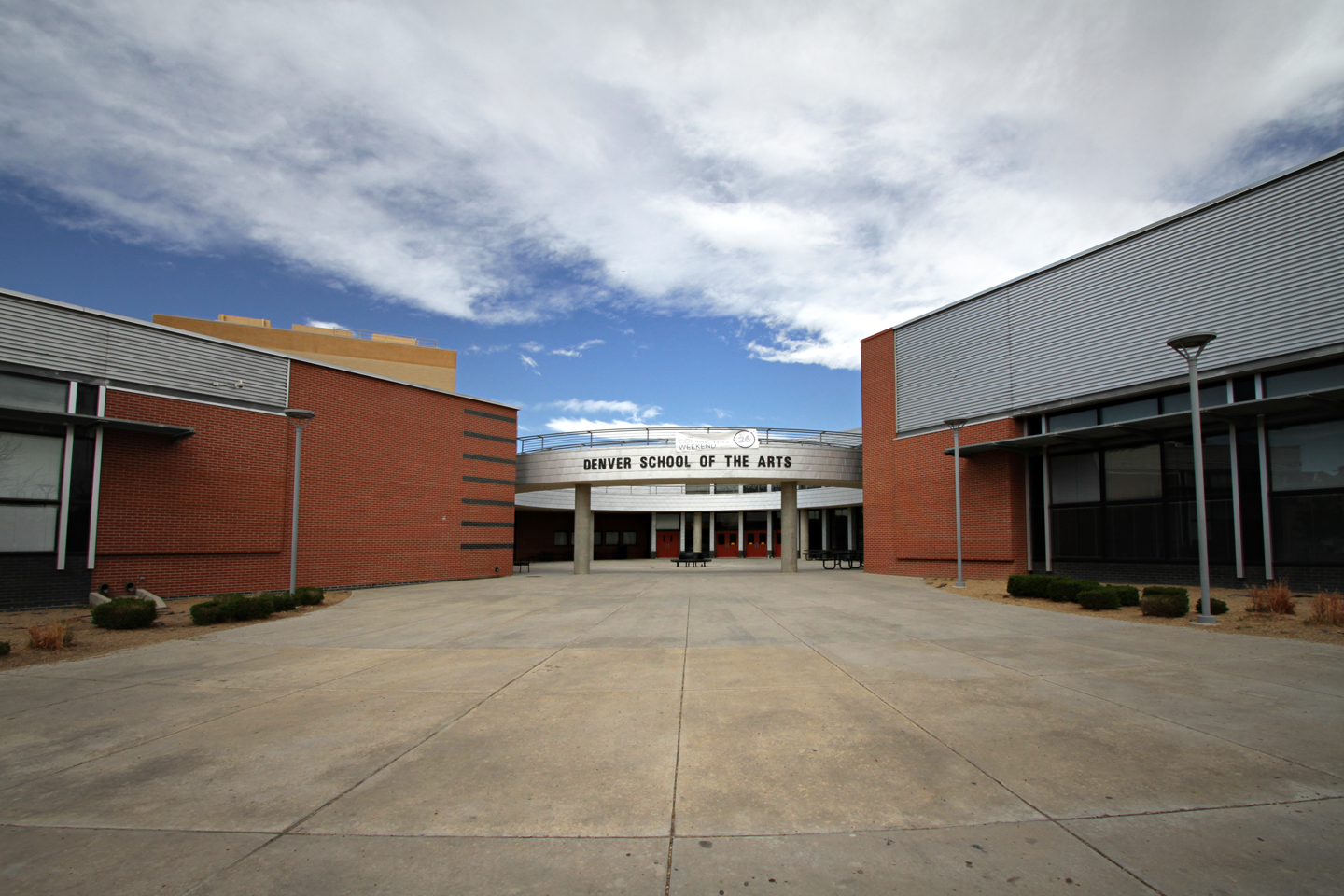
- DSA Rotunda (On East Side of Building)

Location
- 7111 Montview Boulevard; Denver, Colorado 80220; United States; 39°44′53″N 104°54′19″W

Information
- Type: Magnet secondary
- Established: 1991 (35 years ago)
- School district: Denver Public Schools
- Superintendent: Dr. Alex Marrero
- CEEB code: 060443
- Staff: 49.25 (FTE)
- Grades: 6–12
- Enrollment: 1,097 (2018–19)
- Student to teacher ratio: 22.27
- Colors: Black and white
- Mascot: Siberian tiger
- Website: dsa.dpsk12.org

Denver School of the Arts (DSA) is a comprehensive arts secondary public magnet school, serving grades 6–12. Located at 7111 Montview Boulevard in the Park Hill neighborhood of Denver, Colorado, the school is operated by the Denver Public School District.

== History ==
Denver School of the Arts originated as a concurrent program at Manual High School during the late 1980s. It later evolved into a fully staffed institution located on the former campus of Byers Middle School at 150 South Pearl Street, which was once the site of Byers Mansion.

In the 2003–2004 school year, DSA relocated to its current address at 7111 E. Montview Boulevard, occupying the former W. Dale and W. Ida Houston Fine Arts Center. This facility was originally built by the Colorado Women's College and subsequently utilized by the Lamont School of Music.

== Students ==
DSA serves both middle school and high school students. Graduating class sizes are small, with approximately 140 students comprising the Class of 2018.

=== Audition process ===
DSA requires an audition for prospective students competing to join one of its eleven offered majors. These auditions take place in late fall/early winter.

== Extracurricular activities ==
=== Majors ===
Denver School of the Arts offers a variety of majors including Guitar, Vocal Music, Piano, Creative Writing, Video Cinema Arts, Stagecraft and Design, Dance, Visual Arts, Band, Orchestra, and Theatre.

=== Sports ===
Denver School of the Arts does not offer its own extracurricular sports programs, nor does it offer in-school physical education. DSA students are encouraged to participate in sports programs at other Denver high schools and middle schools. Many students at DSA play sports at the sister school of East High School or at their "home" high school.

== Notable alumni ==
- Peter Atencio - director, Key & Peele, Comedy Central; director, Keanu; winner, Peabody Award
- Britt Stewart - (2007) professional dancer, Dancing with the Stars
- Gabriel Ebert - stage actor, Matilda the Musical; screen actor, Ricki and the Flash, Mr. Mercedes; winner, Tony Award for Best Featured Actor in a Musical
- Mondo Guerra - fashion designer, winner, Project Runway: All Stars (2012)
- Justine Lupe - screen actor, Mr. Mercedes, Cristela, Harry's Law
- Jovan Bridges (“Yvie Oddly”) - performer, winner, RuPaul’s Drag Race (2019)
- Mia Asano - violinist, social media personality
- Vinny Thomas - Actor, comedian
