= Mia Asano =

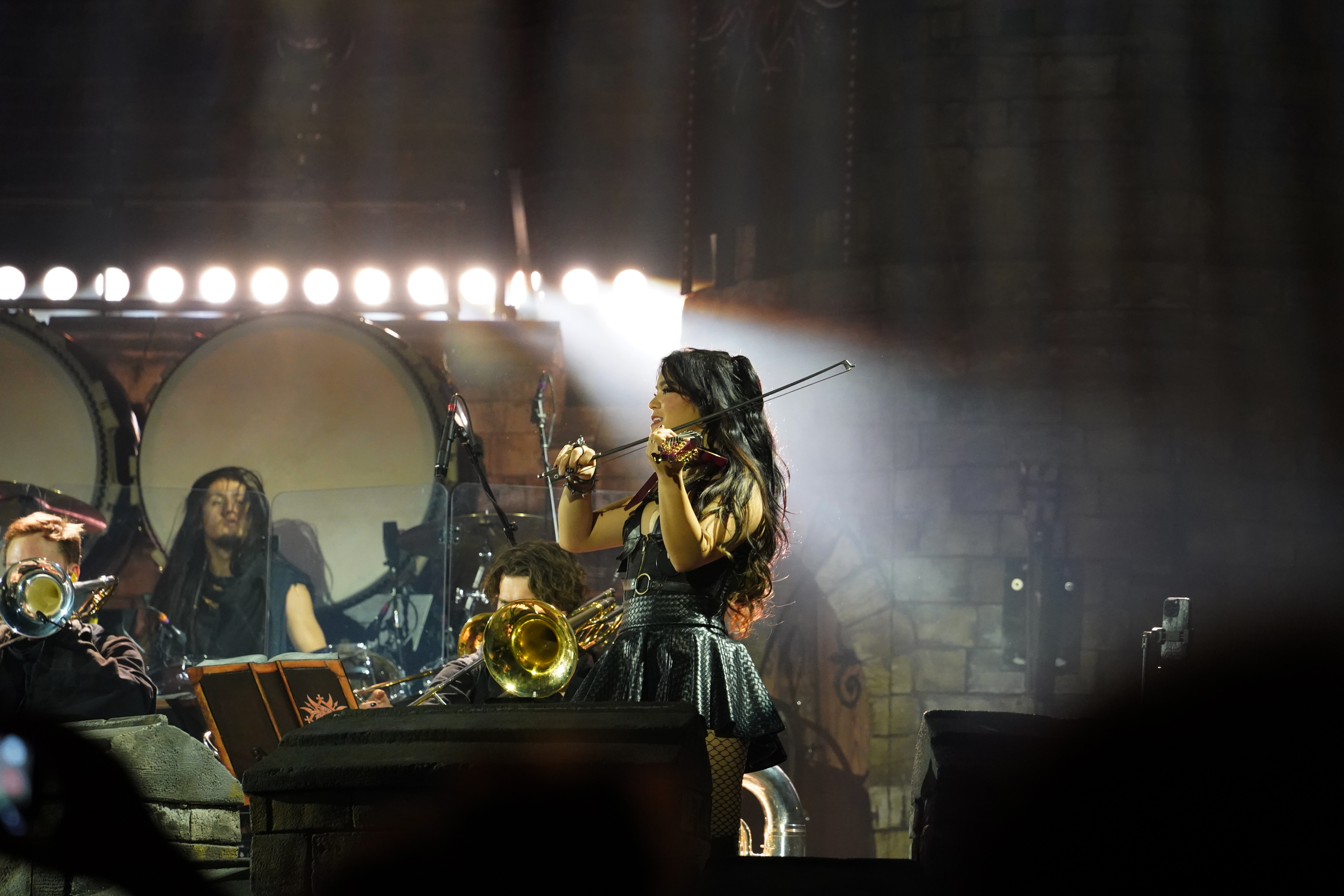
- Asano performing in 2025

Background information
- Born: November 12, 1999 (age 26); Denver, Colorado
- Genres: Classical rock, classical crossover, new-age, heavy metal, industrial metal, progressive rock
- Occupation: Musician
- Instruments: Violin, vocals
- Years active: 2013–present
- Label: Asano Herlinger Music
- Website: Official Website

Mia Asano (born November 12, 1999) is an American musician from Denver, Colorado. Her classically trained performance career as a violinist and electric violinist has led her to record and tour with ensembles specializing in contemporary classical music and hybrid orchestral works.

== Early life ==
Asano began playing violin at age five, in a musical family, by studying the Suzuki method. She is an alumnus of the Denver School of the Arts orchestra program and of the Berklee School of Music with a dual major in Performance and Professional Music, graduating in 2022.

== Career ==
First widespread recognition as a professional violinist came from a viral video in 2021 by Asano, from a cover of “Roses” by SAINt JHN (2018), performed on electric violin.

Asano has collaborated with Tina Guo, Lindsey Stirling, Kiki Wong, and Grace Kelly in performances as the RAMENSTEIN quartet. Asano toured with Ally the Piper as the duo Mia x Ally, a touring group which performs hybrid orchestral arrangements using electric violin and electric bagpipe. These collaborations are distinctive for their use of the aggressive tonality, performance, and fashion choices which follow the heavy metal music aesthetic.

Asano participated as a solo violinist on the 2023 Two Steps From Hell tour.

As of November 2025, Asano is on tour with Sabaton as part of the Legendary Orchestra, which will play the band's music in an orchestral setting. Hurdy-gurdy player, Patty Gurdy will also be a part of the orchestra, and founder of heavy metal choir Scardust, Noa Gruman will be conducting.

== Instruments ==
Asano primarily plays the electric seven-string fretted Viper violin manufactured by Wood Violins.

== Recordings ==
Year	Title	Notes
2021	Lunar (single)	Electric Violin, collab. with violinist Jason Anick
2023	Mia x Ally: The Viral Hits (album)	Electric Violin, collab. with Ally The Piper
2024	Nick Phoenix – Heart Of The Ocean (album)	Electric Violin contrib. Released by Two Steps From Hell
