= Storm Seeker (band) =

German folk metal band

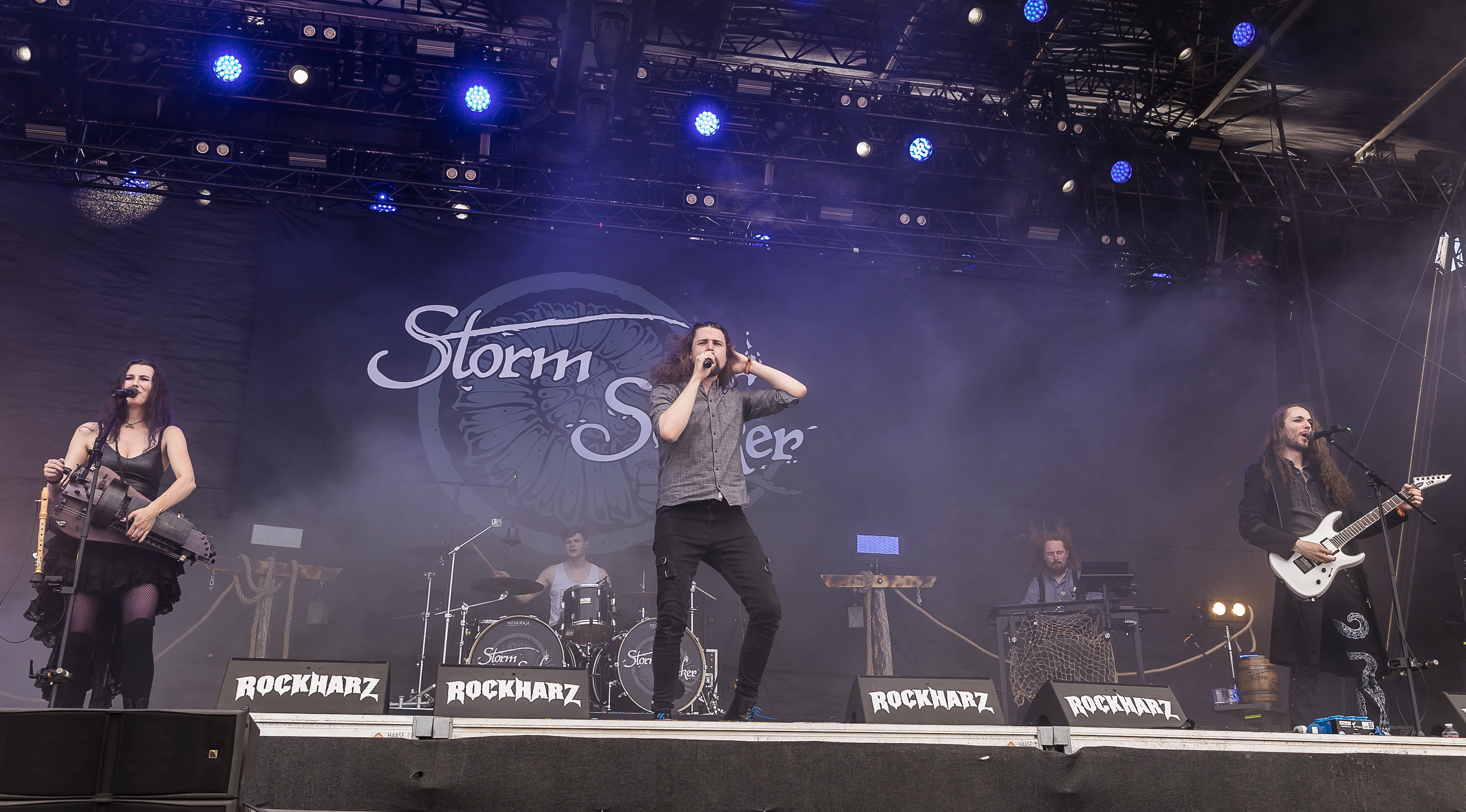
- Storm Seeker in 2024

Background information
- Origin: Neuss and Düsseldorf, Germany
- Genres: Pirate metal, folk metal
- Years active: 2013–present
- Label: NoCut
- Members: Sean Graham; Marius "Olaf" Bornfleth; Tim "Ughar der schrecklich Durstige" Braatz; Fabienne "Fabi" Kirschke; Paul Martens
- Past members: Patricia Büchler; Sandra "Sandy" Schmitt; Patrick Stäudle; Wanda Schikarski; Andreas Schaffrath; Julian Hauptvogel; Timo "Timothy" Bornfleth
- Website: storm-seeker.com

Storm Seeker is a German pirate/folk metal band from Düsseldorf and Neuss. It was founded by brothers Marius and Timo Bornfleth.

== History ==
The band was founded in 2013. After multiple lineup changes, they released the EP Pirate Scum in 2016 via Aeterna Records. Within time, the band played increasingly large concerts, festivals and international gigs, such as Dong Open Air 2017 and Metaldays 2018. In 2018, guitarist Patrick Stäudle left the band. Due to that, Marius Bornfleth took over the guitar and Julian Hauptvogel joined as the drummer. At the end of 2018, Patricia Büchler left the band. For the Tanz und Triebe Tour 2019, Fabienne Kirschke ("Fabi") was found as a replacement. After the tour, she became a permanent member.

The first album, Beneath in the Cold, was released on 18 May 2019. In the same year, some singles and music videos were released.

In 2020, they switched to the label NoCut from Hamburg and re-released their first album Beneath in the Cold with them.

Also in 2020, they played a headliner gig, three concerts with Mono Inc and at the Online Musik Festival. In the same year, drummer Julian Hauptvogel left the band.

The second album Guns Don't Cry was released on 29 January 2021. It contains special appearances from Mr. Hurley & die Pulveraffen, Sebastian Levermann from Orden Ogan, and Tanzwut.

In September 2021, they announced a new upcoming album called Calm Seas Vol. 1, to be released on 26 November 2021. The album features acoustic versions of previously released songs, as well as the two traditional songs they covered in 2021 (see Discography). After the album was released, cellist Sandra Schmitt left the band. As of mid-2022, she still hasn't been replaced.

On 29 July 2022, the band announced that Paul Martens had joined on guitars.

On 21 October 2024, lead singer Timothy "Timo" Bornfleth announced his departure from the band. On 30 October 2024, Sean Graham introduced himself on social media as the new lead singer of Storm Seeker.

On 14 March 2025, the band released its fifth studio album, Set the Sails.

== Musical style ==
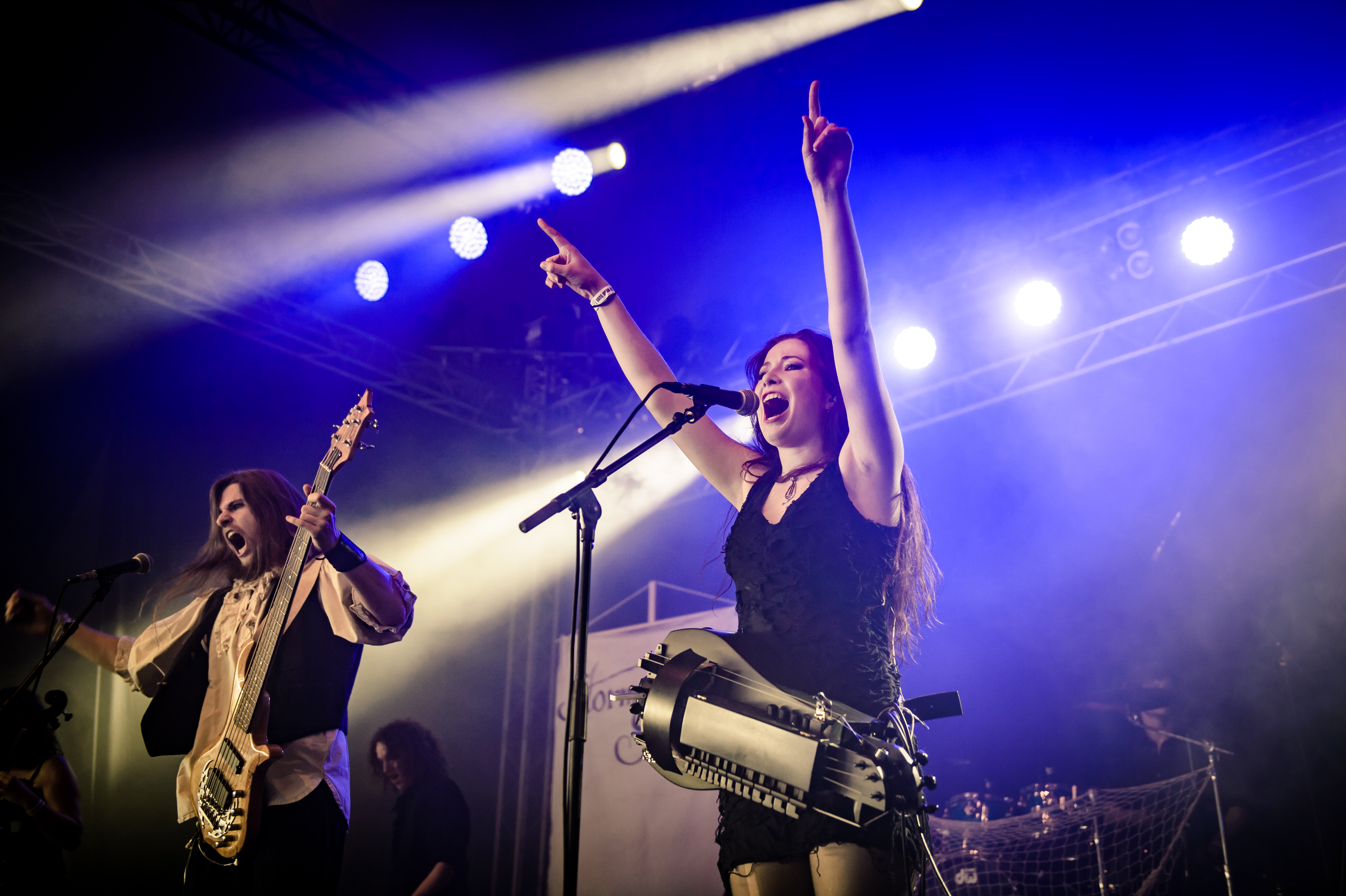
Storm Seeker at Dong Open Air 2017

Besides guitar, bass, drums, keyboards and rough male main vocals, Storm Seeker's music features a hurdy gurdy, a cello, flutes and a nyckelharpa. On some songs, Fabi and Sandy also sing, either solo parts or sometimes an entire song (such as "One More Day", where Fabi is the sole singer). The style defines itself over the whole range of folk metal. The band describes itself as "a mix of boozy folk music with strong, breaking metal riffs and a pinch of epicness". The band's repertoire contains progressive, serious and long pieces as well as party-friendly drinking songs. Topics are primary nautical themes and piracy.

== Members ==
=== Current members ===
- Marius "Olaf Abor" Bornfleth – drums, percussion (2013–2018, 2020–present), backing vocals (2013–present), guitars (2018–2022)
- Tim "Ughar der Schrecklich Durstige" Braatz – keyboards, accordion (2015–present)
- Fabienne "Fabi" Kirschke – hurdy-gurdy, recorders, backing and lead vocals (2019–present)
- Paul Martens – guitars (2022–present)
- Sean Graham – vocals (2024–present)

=== Former members ===
- Timo "Timothy Abor" Bornfleth – lead vocals, bass guitar (2013–2024)
- Sandra "Sandy McGnomsen" Schmitt – cello, nyckelharpa, backing vocals (2013–2021), lead vocals (2018–2021)
- Wanda Schikarski – keyboards, whistles (2013–2014)
- Andreas Schaffrath – guitars (2013–2014)
- Patrick Stäudle – guitars, backing vocals (2015–2018)
- Patricia "Patty Gurdy" Büchler – hurdy-gurdy, whistles, backing and lead vocals (2015–2018)
- Julian "Ju" Hauptvogel – drums, percussion (2018–2020)

== Discography ==
Sales chart performance for Guns Don't Cry
Chart (2021)	Peak position
German Albums (Offizielle Top 100)	94

=== Studio albums ===
Title	Release date	Label
Beneath in the Cold	18 April 2019	Self-released (2020 re-release by NoCut Entertainment)
Guns Don't Cry	29 January 2021	NoCut Entertainment
Calm Seas Vol. 1	26 November 2021	NoCut Entertainment
Nautic Force	28 April 2023	
Set the Sails	14 March 2025	NoCut Entertainment

=== EPs ===
Title	Release date	Label
Pirate Scum	22 April 2016	Aeterna Records

=== Singles/Music videos ===
Year	Title	Album/EP	Notes
2016	"Destined Course"	Pirate Scum	
2017	"The Longing"	Pirate Scum	
2019	"Pirate Squad"	Beneath in the Cold	
2019	"Drag O Below"	Beneath in the Cold	
2020	"Row Row Row"	Guns Don't Cry	
2020	"Rum"	Beneath in the Cold	
2020	"Guns Don't Cry"	Guns Don't Cry	
2020	"Naval Hitchhike"	Guns Don't Cry	
2020	"How to Be a Pirate"	Guns Don't Cry	
2021	"Deathwatch Beetle Party"	Guns Don't Cry	Feat. Mr. Hurley & Die Pulveraffen
2021	"Wellerman"	Calm Seas Vol. 1	Trad.
2021	"Randy Dandy Oh"	Calm Seas Vol. 1	Trad.
2021	"Destined Course (Calm Seas Version)"	Calm Seas Vol. 1	Acoustic version of Destined Course
