= Hellscore =

Israeli a cappella choir

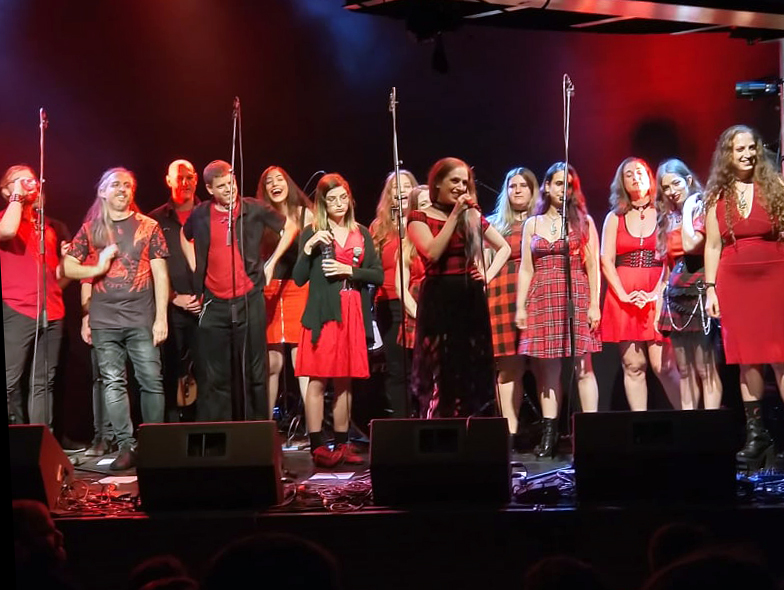
- Hellscore in 2021

Background information
- Years active: 2016-present
- Website: hellscore.rocks

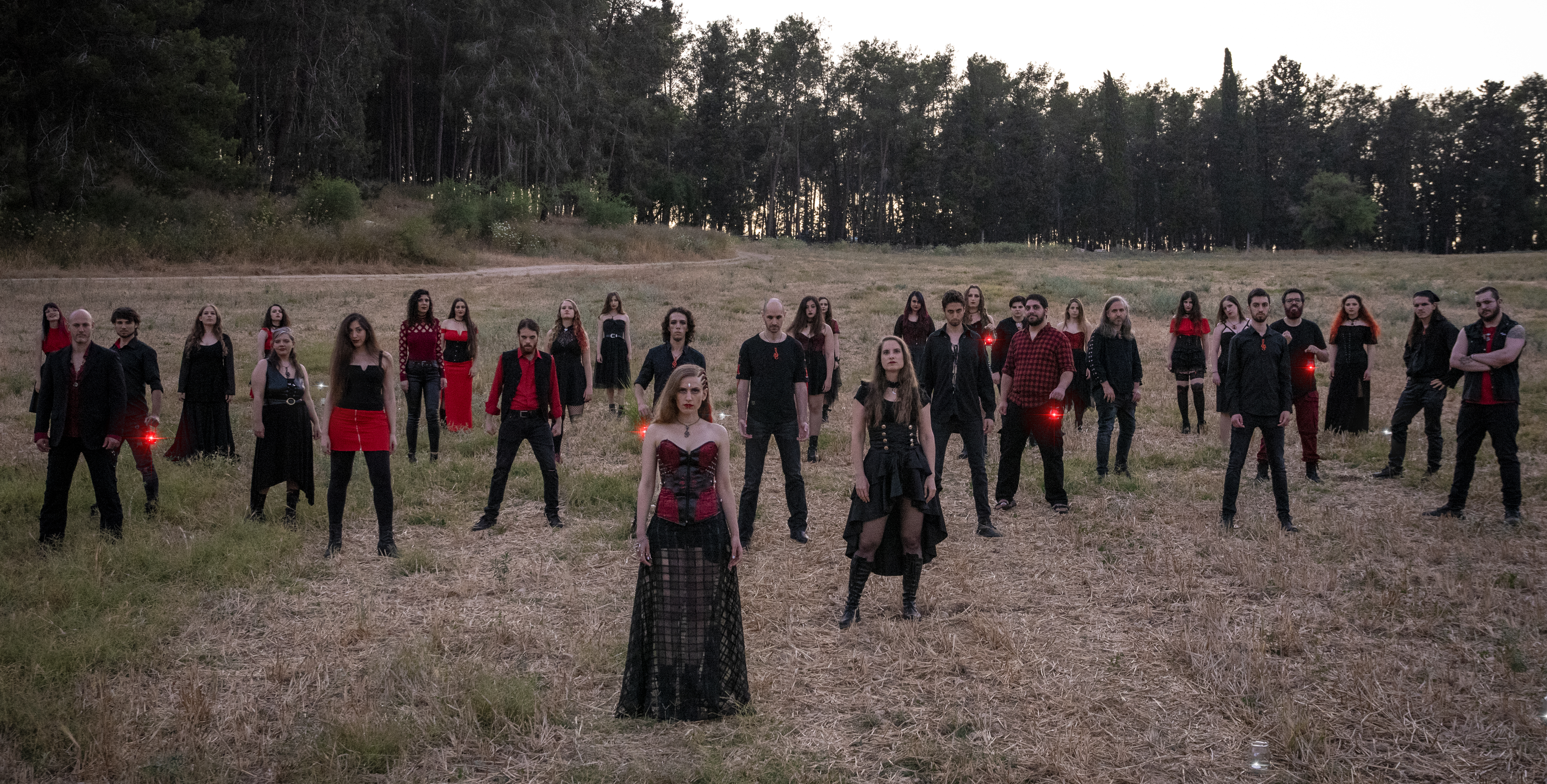
Hellscore in 2020

Hellscore is an Israeli a cappella choir specializing in heavy metal music.

The choir was founded in 2016 by Noa Gruman, lead singer of the Israeli metal band Scardust, who also serves as its conductor and musical director. It comprises approximately 40 singers, and its repertoire includes songs by metal and hard rock bands such as Iron Maiden, Judas Priest, System of a Down, Slipknot, Linkin Park, Sabaton, and others. The choir performs these songs in an a cappella style, using only human voices without any musical instruments.

According to the choir, it is the first a cappella metal choir in the world and is certainly among the pioneers of the genre. Gruman has cited the German band Van Canto, which mimics the sounds of guitars and other instruments using seven singers and a drummer, as one of the choir's inspirations.

In 2018, Hellscore performed on the main stage of the vocal music festival Europa Cantat held in Tallinn, Estonia. In 2019, the choir won the 'Most Innovative Arrangement' award at the Aarhus Vocal Festival competition, organized by the Royal Academy of Music of Aarhus, Denmark.

Over the years, Hellscore has collaborated with numerous bands and artists from Israel and around the world. Highlights include contributions to the Swedish band Therion's albums Leviathan I (2021), Leviathan II (2022), and Leviathan III (2023); the British band Gloryhammer's album Return to the Kingdom of Fife (2023); the Scottish band Alestorm's album Seventh Rum of a Seventh Rum (2022); Ayreon's album Transitus (2020) by Dutch musician Arjen Anthony Lucassen; the German hurdy-gurdy player Patty Gurdy's album Pest & Power (2018); and the Finnish band Amorphis's album Queen of Time (2018). In 2024, during a visit by Disturbed's lead singer David Draiman, they recorded a joint cover of the song "Sound of Silence".

In 2025, Hellscore recorded an a cappella version of Epica's single "T.I.M.E" with Epica's vocalists Mark Jansen and Simone Simons.

Hellscore regularly accompanies the Israeli band Orphaned Land during their performances in Israel and contributed to their album Unsung Prophets & Dead Messiahs (2018). Additionally, the choir participated in two albums by Gruman's own band, Scardust: Sands of Time (2017) and Strangers (2020).
