= Nanadiya =

- Village
- Location in Gujarat, India Nanadiya (India)
- Coordinates: 21.48°N 70.07°E
- Country: India
- State: Gujarat

Languages
  - Official: Gujarati, Hindi
- Time zone: UTC+5:30 (IST)
- Vehicle registration: GJ
- Website: gujaratindia.com

Nanadiya is a small village in Gujarat, India within the Manavadar taluka of Junagadh district. It is located between Junagadh and Porbandar, around 25 km from the Arabian Sea. It has an average elevation of 24 metres (78 feet) above mean sea level.

The village population is approximately 3,000 with farming the most common occupation. The village contains the Dayaram Ashram and temples to Rama, Mahadev, Hanuman and Shrinathji. The famous Dada Kotadiya ancient madh(Shrine) is also located in this village. This madh is one of the three madhas of Dada. This madh (Shrine) is manage by Meghaval Samaj Nanadiya . The village has a school and a high schools as well as an anganwadi childcare centre.

Until the Independence of India in 1947 the village was ruled by a nawab. Since 1977 it is within Porbandar parliamentary constituency. The interesting political history of Nanadiya is compiled by Vrajlal Sapovadia in his article published in Gujarati and people born or worked within periphery of Nanadiya is compiled by Vrajlal Sapovadia. .

The village is surrounded by three distinct geographical regions namely Gir, Ghed and Barda mountain. The characteristics of each region is compiled by Vrajlal Sapovadia in a story published.

Nanadiya is close to the villages of Sitana, Nakra, Vadala, Bantwa, Manavadar, Kahkhavi, Mitadi and Matiyana and to the town of Bantwa. The major crop is groundnuts but cotton, maize, millet (bajra), sorghum (juwar) and cumin are also cultivated.

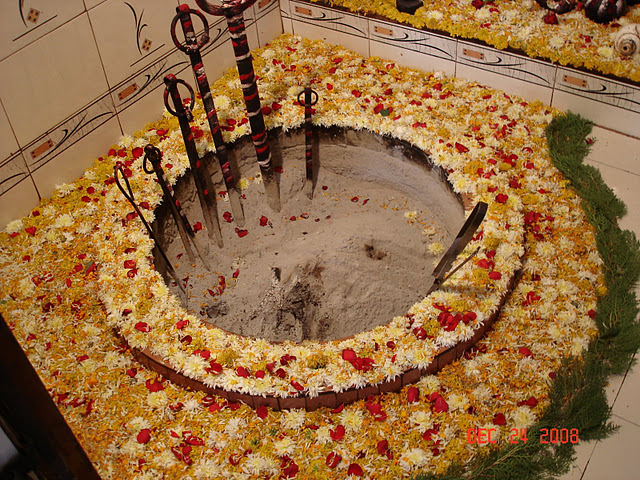
Dayaram Ashram

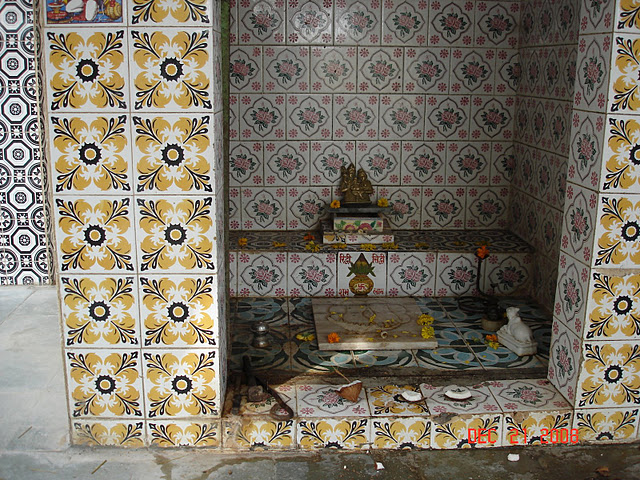
Dayaram Ashram

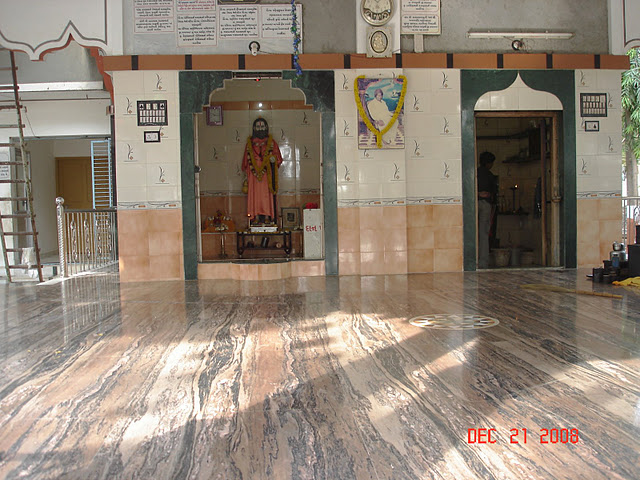
Dayaram Ashram

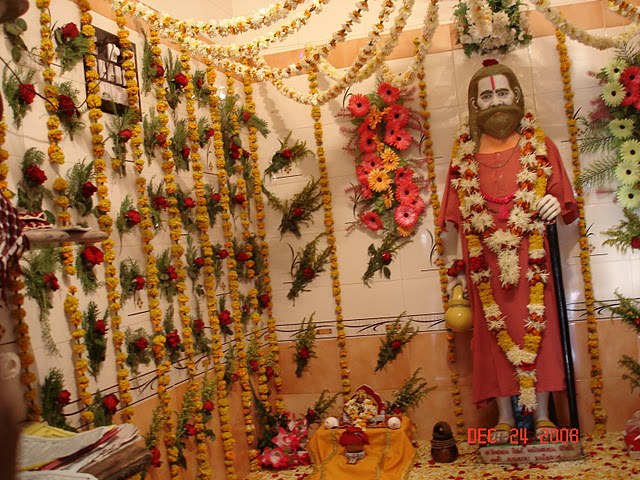
Dayaram Ashram

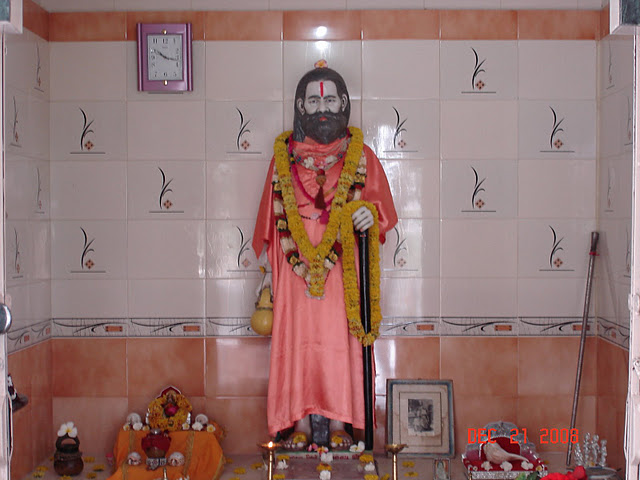
Dayaram Ashram

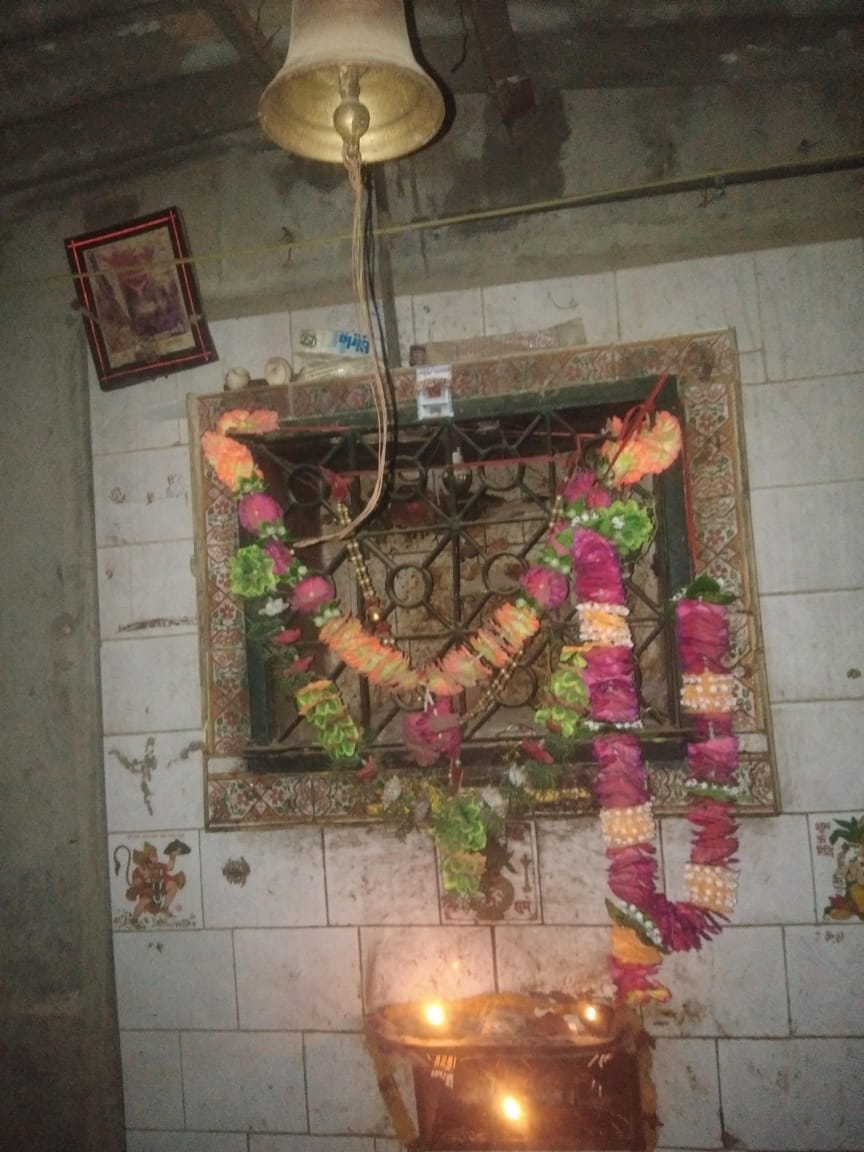
Jay Dada Kotadiya
