= Ahmad Adaya =

American real estate tycoon and philanthropist (1927–2006)

Ahmad Adaya احمد ادایا
- Born: Ahmad Adaya; 1927; Bantva Kathiawar (Gujarat) India
- Died: 2006 (aged 78–79)
- Occupation: Philanthropist

Ahmad Adaya (Urdu: احمد ادایا) (1927–2006) was an American real estate tycoon and philanthropist who was the founding partner of a California real estate company IDS Real Estate Group. He was known for establishing the New Horizon School for Muslim religious education in southern California.

== Biography ==
=== Early life ===
Adaya was born in Bantva Kathiawar, in the Gujarat state of India to a Memon family. At a young age, he worked with his father and uncle in the salt distribution business. He married Amina Dada in 1946 and the couple had a daughter. In 1947, when India was partitioned, Adaya migrated to Pakistan. He received a Bachelor of Arts degree in economics from University of Karachi in 1950. Later, he began a textile business as a distributor of yarns made in Japan and Europe.

Adaya went to Southern California to visit his family in the mid-1970s. Here, he had a heart attack and made the decision to stay in the United States. From then on, he and his wife spent part of each year in Santa Monica until immigrating to the United States in 1976. His six grown children (five daughters and a son) also settled in Santa Monica.

== Business career ==
Adaya started his career in America buying and leasing industrial properties in the Los Angeles area. Soon after, he established the Meridian Group, a property management company based in West Los Angeles. He owned the Shangri-La Hotel in Santa Monica. He donated land for Westside campus, one of the four campuses of the New Horizon School, in 1984, and the money to build an auditorium for the Pasadena campus. He also sponsored Islamic art exhibitions in Los Angeles County Museum of Art and funded a publication on Islamic artifacts.

There is also a fellowship called the Ahmad Adaya Cardiothoracic Research Fellowship established at St Lukes Roosevelt Hospital Center and Columbia University College of Physicians and Surgeons in his honor. An endowment under the name of Ahmad Adaya Cardiothoracic Research Fellowship Program has been established at St.Luke's - Roosevelt Hospital Center, Columbia University College of Physicians and Surgeons.

== See also ==
- Bantva
- Memon people
- Pakistani Americans
