= Khadiya Porsa =

Khadiya Porsa Khadiya khadiyahar
- village
- Khadiyahar
- State: Madhya Pradesh
- District: Morena
- Founder: Rao Saheb Gowardhan Singh Tomar

Languages
  - Official: Hindi, Hindi
- Time zone: UTC+5:30 (IST)
- Postal code: 476554
- Vehicle registration: MP06
- Website: madhyapradesh.com

Khadiya Porsa, Khadiyahar (Zamindari) is a village in the Chambal region of Madhya Pradesh state in India. It is located in Morena. Khadiya was established by Rao Saheb Gowardhan Singh of Biloni in 1742.
