= Bantva =

- town
- Location in Gujarat, India Location in India
- Coordinates: 21°29′21″N 70°04′36″E
- Country: India
- State: Gujarat
- District: Junagadh

Population (2001)
  - Total: 15,216

Languages
  - Official: Gujarati
- Time zone: UTC+5:30 (IST)
- Nearest city: Manavadar

Bantva is a little town in Saurashtra region of the state of Gujarat in India.

== Geography ==
Bantva is located at an altitude of 20 meters. Nearby towns are Nanadiya, Limbuda, Nakara Manavadar, Vanthali, Junagadh, Keshod, Visavadar, Kutiyana, Dhoraji, Porbandar and Rajkot. The town is roughly 10 kilometers from the Arabian Sea.

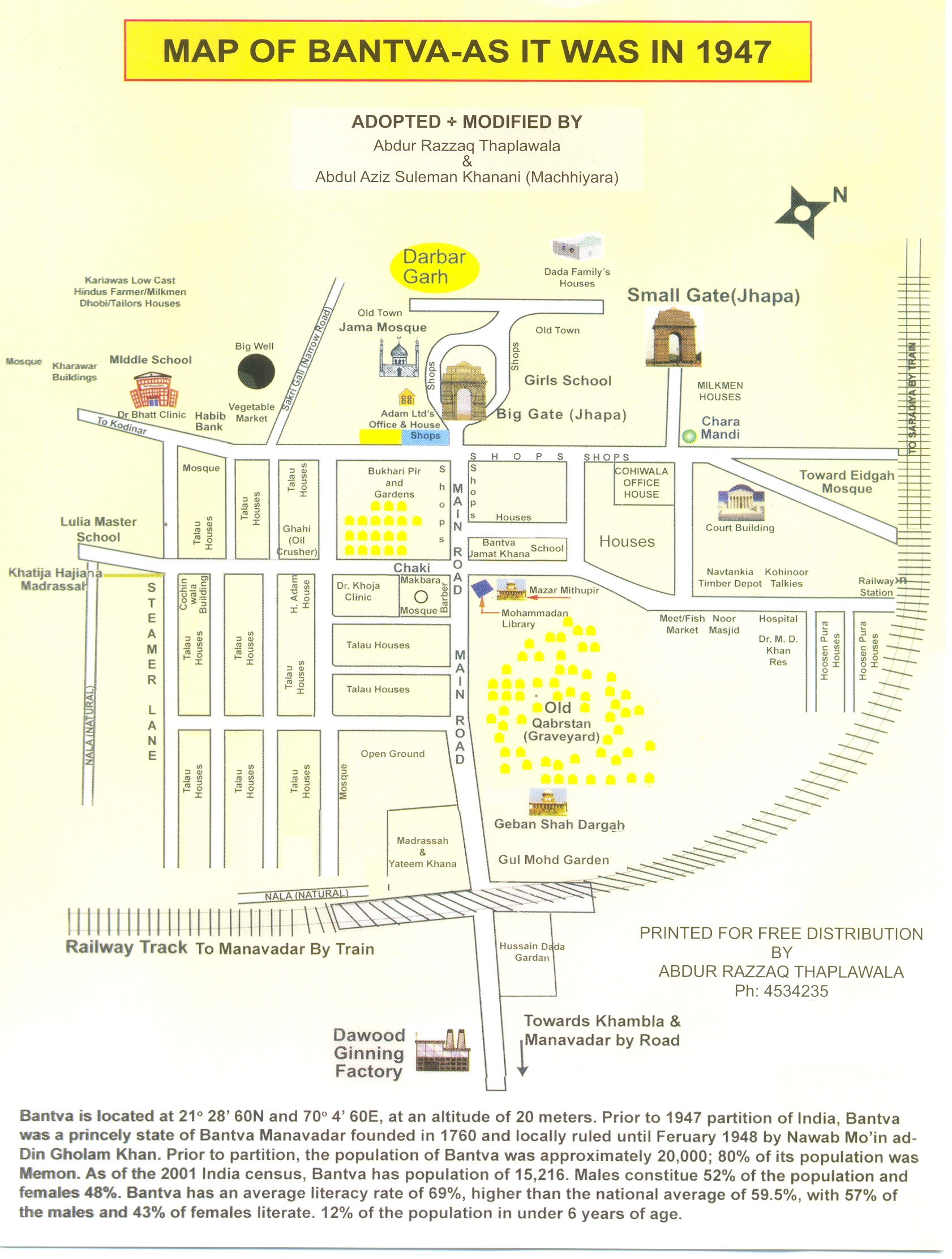
This is a map of Bantva as it was in 1947

== History ==
During the British Raj in 1947, Bantva was part of the princely state of Bantva Manavadar in Kathiawar, founded in 1760 and locally ruled until February 1948 by Khan Himmat Khan, son of Khan Amir Khan, of the Muslim Babi family of Junagadh State. In 1947 it followed the neighboring and more powerful Princely state of Junagadh into union with Pakistan, but that decision was quickly reversed by Indian occupation and subsequent plebiscite. It is a decision Pakistan has never accepted.

== Demographics ==
Before 1947, the population of Bantva was approximately 20,000; 80% of its population was lower caste Memon. As of the 2001 India census, Bantva had a population of 15,216. Males constitute 52% of the population and females 48%. Bantva has an average illiteracy rate of 40%. 12% of the population is under 6 years of age.

== Sources and external links ==
- My Memories of Bantva By: Abdur Razzaq Thaplawala
- Batva Recollection (Excerpts from "A Ramble Through Life" by Mr. Kassim Dada)
- Memon Po!nt by Abdul Ghaffar Variend, Chicago, IL USA
- World Memon Organization of North America, Chicago, IL USA
- Manavadar-Bantva Princely State
