= Limbuda =

- village
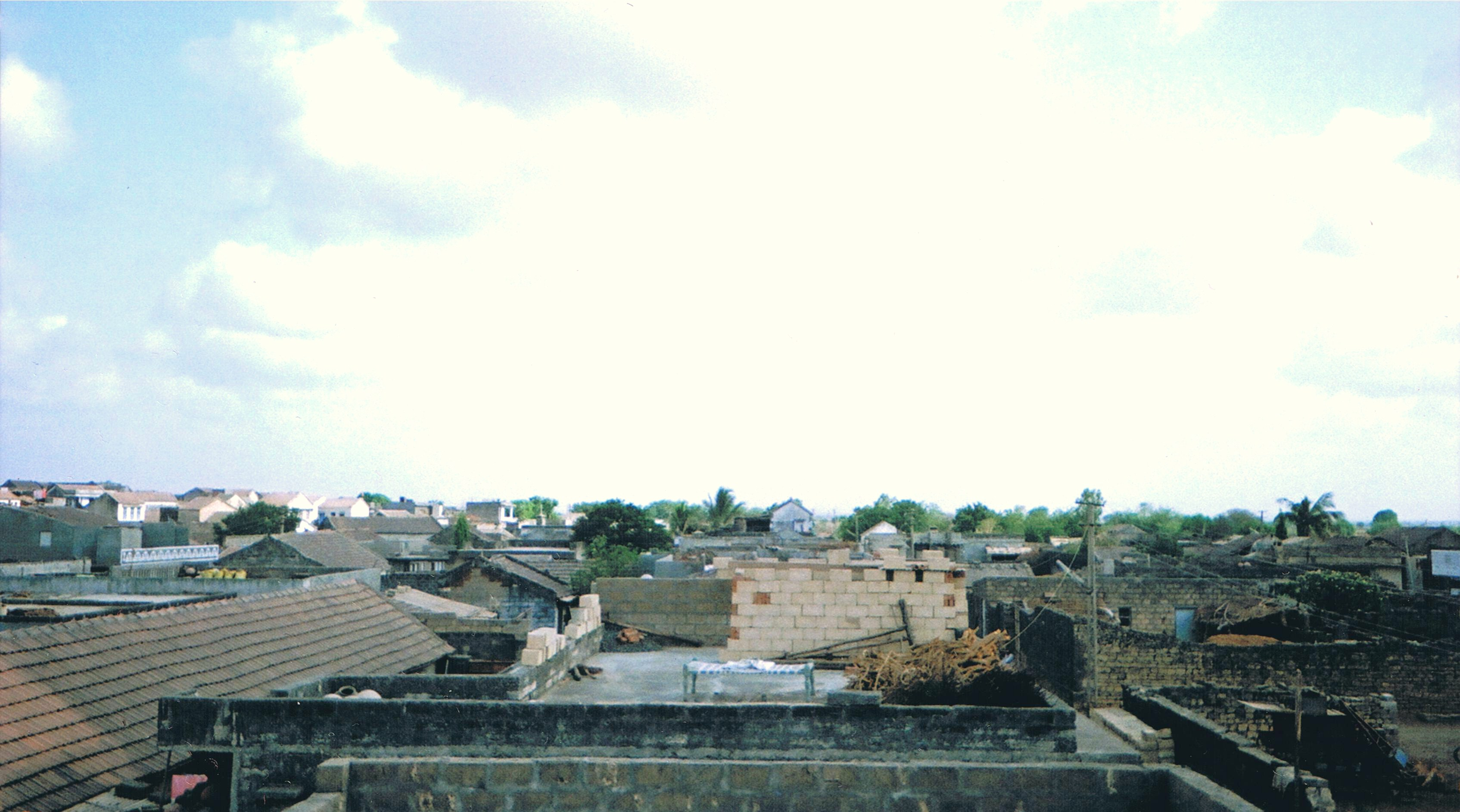
- Limbuda Village Skyline

- Location in Gujarat, India Limbuda (India)
- Coordinates: 21°34′21″N 70°5′17″E
- Country: India
- State: Gujarat
- District: Junagadh

Population (2001)
  - Total: 2,548

Languages
  - Official: Gujarati, Hindi
- Time zone: UTC+5:30 (IST)
- PIN: 362620
- Telephone code: 02874
- Vehicle registration: GJ
- Nearest city: Manavadar
- Literacy: 74.18%
- Website: gujaratindia.com

Limbuda is a village in Junagdh District in the state of Gujarat, India. As of 2025 India census, there were 2548 people residing in Limbuda. There were 1266 males and 1282 females, thus males constitute 49.7% of population and females 50.3%. Limbuda has an average literacy rate of 74.18%. The PIN Code of Limbuda is 362620.

== Temples in Limbuda ==
1. VEER VACHHRAJ TEMPLE

2. Navneet Priyaji's Haveli

3. Mahaprabhuji's Bethak

4. Hanuman Temple

5. Gadheshwari-Limboshwari Mataji Temple

6. Swaminarayan Temple

7. Anandashram (Nathuram Sharma's)

8. Shiva temple

9. Fuletra Patel Samaj

10. Trambdiya Patel Samaj

11.Madan Mohanji's Haveli (Ram Mandir-Choro)

== Gallery ==
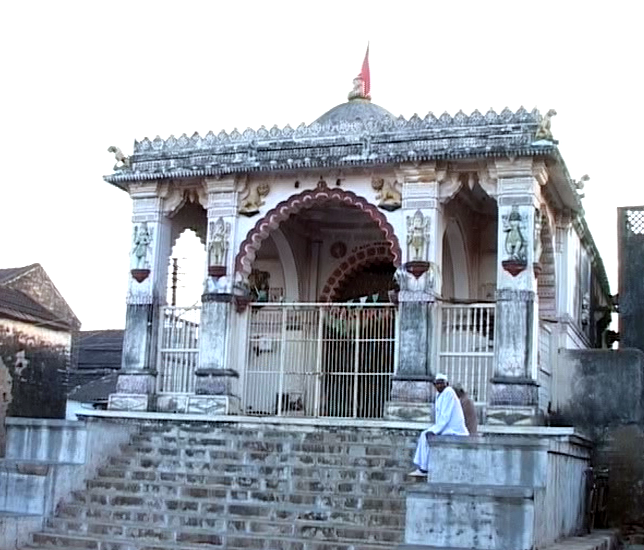
Madan Mohanji's Haveli, Limbuda

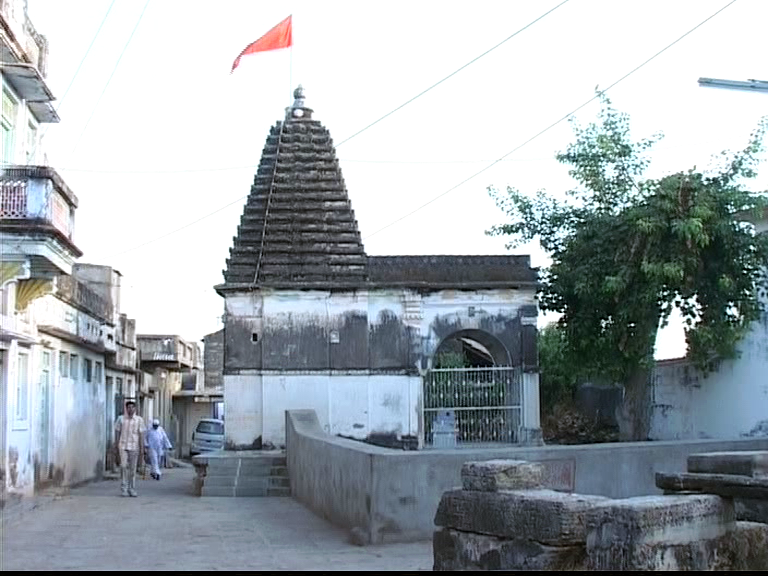
Shiva Temple, Limbuda

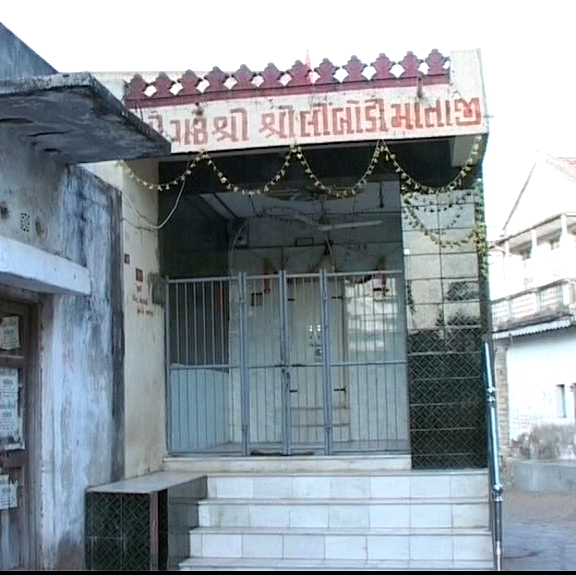
Gadheshwari-Limboshwari (Limbodi) Mataji Temple, Limbuda

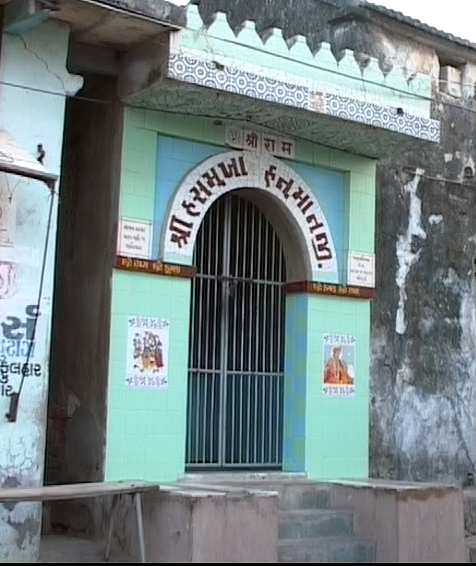
Hasmukhaa Hanumanji Temple, Limbuda

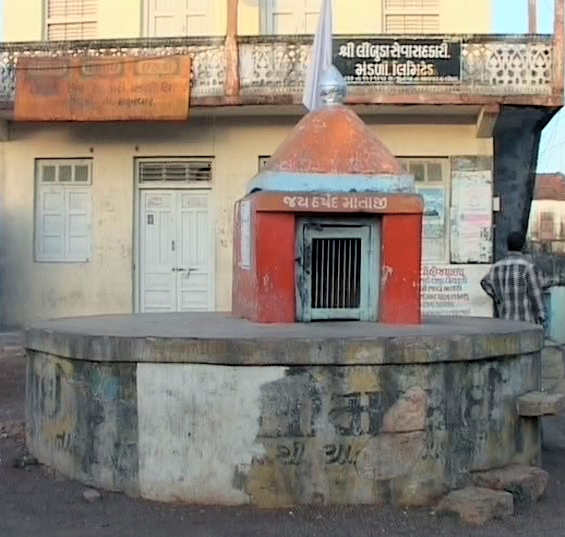
Harshad Mataji Temple, Limbuda
